= Dickinson (name) =

Dickinson is an English patronymic surname, meaning "son of Dick" (a medieval pet form of the given name Richard). It is also occasionally used as a given name.

Notable people with the name include:

== Surname ==
=== A ===
- Adam Dickinson, Canadian poet
- Alan Dickinson (born 1947), English rugby league footballer
- Alasdair Dickinson (born 1983), Scotland international rugby union player
- Alfred Dickinson (1914–1998), Welsh footballer
- Almaron Dickinson (1800–1836), Texian soldier
- Alyce M. Dickinson, American organizational psychologist
- Amie Beth Dickinson (born 1975), American activist
- Amy Dickinson (born 1959), American newspaper columnist
- Andrew B. Dickinson (1801–1873), American politician
- Angie Dickinson (born 1931), American actress
- Anna Elizabeth Dickinson (1842–1932), American abolitionist and suffragist
- Anson Dickinson (1779–1852), American painter
- Anthony R. Dickinson (born 1960), British neuroscientist
- Arlene Dickinson (born 1956), South African Canadian businesswoman
- Arthur Dickinson (football manager) (1851–1930), English football manager and secretary
- Arthur Dickinson (footballer) (1907–1976), English footballer
- Arthur Harold Dickinson (1892–1978), British senior colonial police officer
- Arthur Lowes Dickinson (1859–1935), British chartered accountant
- Austin Dickinson (American football) (born c. 1988), American football coach

=== B ===
- Basil Dickinson (1915–2013), Australian long and triple jumper
- Baxter Dickinson (1795–1875), American minister
- Ben Dickinson (1912–2000), Australian geologist
- Benjamin Dickinson, American film director
- Bill Dickinson (1917–1994), Scottish rugby union footballer and coach
- Billy Dickinson (1906–1968), English footballer
- Blanche Taylor Dickinson (1896–1972), American writer
- Bo Dickinson (born 1935), American football player
- Brenda Dickinson, British archaeologist and pottery specialist
- Brett Dickinson (born 1962), American tennis player
- Brian Dickinson (born 1961), Canadian pianist
- Brian Dickinson (climber) (born 1974), American author
- Bruce Dickinson (born 1958), English heavy metal singer

=== C ===
- Calvin Dickinson (born 1996), South African-born English cricketer
- Carl Dickinson (born 1987), English footballer
- Charles Dickinson (planter) (1780–1806), American attorney and duelist
- Charles Dickinson (author) (born 1951), American novelist and short story writer
- Charles Dickinson (scientist) (1755–1827), English landowner and magistrate
- Charles Dickinson (bishop) (1792–1842), Irish Anglican bishop
- Charles Dickinson (footballer) (1881–1955), Argentine footballer
- Charles Dickinson (priest) (1871–1930), Archdeacon of Bristol from 1921 until 1927
- Charles Edgar Dickinson (1908–1964), American landscape architect
- Charles M. Dickinson (1842–1924), American lawyer, editor, and diplomat
- Chris Dickinson (born 1987), American professional wrestler
- Clarence Dickinson (1873–1969), American composer and organist
- Clement C. Dickinson (1849–1938), American politician
- Clive Dickinson (born 1940), English rugby league footballer
- Colin Dickinson (1931–2006), New Zealand cyclist
- Crystal Dickinson, American actress

=== D ===
- Daniel A. Dickinson (1839–1902), American judge
- Daniel Dickinson (baseball) (born 2003), American baseball player
- Daniel S. Dickinson (1800–1866), American politician and lawyer
- David Dickinson (born 1941), English antiques expert, television presenter and entrepreneur
- David Dickinson (academic), American teaching and learning educator
- David Dickinson (cricketer) (1929–1997), English cricketer
- David T. Dickinson (1867–1930), American politician
- David W. Dickinson (1808–1845), American politician
- Debbie Dickinson (born 1957), American actress and fashion model
- Desmond Dickinson (1902–1986), British cinematographer
- Dick Dickinson (1895–1956), American actor
- Don Dickinson (born 1947), Canadian writer
- Donald M. Dickinson (1846–1917), American politician and lawyer
- Douglas Dickinson (1886–1949), British Army general
- Duo Dickinson (born 1955), American architect
- Dwight Dickinson, United States Navy officer and diplomat

=== E ===
- Ebony Dickinson, American basketball player
- Edmund Dickinson (1624–1707), English physician, alchemist, and philosopher
- Edward C. Dickinson (born 1938), British ornithologist
- Edward Dickinson (1803–1874), American politician
- Edward F. Dickinson (1829–1891), American politician
- Edwin Dickinson (1891–1978), American painter
- Eileen Dickinson (born 1949), Vermont state representative
- Elizabeth Evitts Dickinson, American journalist and author
- Ellie Dickinson (born 1998), British cyclist
- Elmira J. Dickinson (1831–1912), American missionary and temperance worker
- Emily Dickinson (1830–1886), American poet
- Emily Norcross Dickinson (1804–1882), Mother of Emily Dickinson
- Ensign Dickinson (1819–1897), American politician

=== F ===
- Fairleigh Dickinson Jr. (1919–1996), American politician and businessman
- Fairleigh S. Dickinson (1866–1948), American businessman and donor
- Frances Dickinson (physician) (1856–1945), American physician and humanitarian worker
- Frances Dickinson (prior) (1755–1830), British prioress
- Frances Dickinson (musician), New Zealand-based musician and vocal coach
- Francis Dickinson (politician) (1813–1890), English Conservative Party politician
- Francis Dickinson (1632–1704), English soldier
- Francke W. Dickinson (1849–1922), American politician
- Frank Dickinson (1879–1962), British trade union leader
- Frederick Dickinson (born 1961), American historian

=== G ===
- Gardner Dickinson (1927–1998), American professional golfer
- Gary Dickinson (1938–2000), American automotive industry executive
- Gary Dickinson (bowler) (born 1943), American professional ten-pin bowler
- George Dickinson (1903–1978), New Zealand sportsman
- George Dickinson (Canterbury cricketer) (1828–1913), New Zealand cricketer
- George Lemuel Dickinson (1848–1930), Canadian politician
- George W. Dickinson (1843–1928), American politician
- Goldsworthy Lowes Dickinson (1862–1932), British historian and activist
- Gordon Dickinson (1901–1991), Australian tennis player

=== H ===
- H. T. Dickinson (1939–2024), English historian
- Harley Dickinson (1938–2008), Australian politician
- Harold Dickinson (1911–1997), Welsh cricketer
- Harold Dickinson (footballer) (1908–1988), Australian rules footballer
- Harris Dickinson (born 1996), English actor
- Helen Dickinson (born 1966), British accountant and business executive
- Henry Winram Dickinson (1870–1952), British engineering historian
- Hercules Dickinson (1827–1905), Irish Anglican priest and theologian
- Hugh Dickinson (1929–2025), English clergyman
- Hunter Dickinson (born 2000), American basketball player

=== J ===
- J. Thomas Dickinson, American physicist and astronomer
- Jacob Alan Dickinson (1911–1971), American politician
- Jacob M. Dickinson (1851–1928), American politician
- James Dickinson (taxidermist) (born 1950), British conservation-restoration taxidermist
- James Dickinson (cricketer) (born 1998), Scottish cricketer
- James Dickinson (Nebraska politician) (1917–2004), American politician
- James H. Dickinson (born 1965), U.S. Army general officer
- James Shelton Dickinson (1818–1882), American politician
- Janice Dickinson (born 1955), American model and television personality
- Jason Dickinson (born 1995), Canadian ice hockey player
- Jess H. Dickinson (born 1947), American judge
- Jesse Dickinson, American legislator
- Jessica Dickinson (born 1975), Abstract painter
- Jim Dickinson (1941–2009), American musician
- Jimmy Dickinson (1925–1982), English footballer
- Jimmy Dickinson (footballer, born 1899) (1899–1971), English footballer
- Joan Dickinson, American artist, writer, director, curator and educator
- Jody Dickinson, American politician
- Joe Dickinson (born 1956), American football player and coach
- John Dean Dickinson (1767–1841), American politician
- John Dickinson (inventor) (1782–1869), British inventor
- John Dickinson (1732–1808), Founding Father of the United States
- John Dickinson (bishop) (1901–1993), British Anglican bishop
- John Dickinson (author) (born 1962), English author
- John Dickinson (judge) (1806–1882), Australian politician
- John Dickinson (magistrate) (1848–1933), British barrister and chief magistrate
- John Dickinson (rugby league) (1934–2021), England international rugby league footballer
- John Dickinson (writer) (1815–1876), English writer on India
- John Dickinson (physician) (1927–2015), British physician and clinical researcher
- John Quincy Dickinson (1836–1871), American politician
- John W. Dickinson (1825–1901), American educator
- Jon-Lewis Dickinson (born 1986), British boxer
- Jonathan Dickinson (1663–1722), American mayor and writer
- Jonathan Dickinson (New Jersey minister) (1688–1747), American minister and co-founder of Princeton University
- Joseph H. Dickinson, American politician
- Josephine Dickinson (born 1957), English poet
- Judy Dickinson (born 1950), American professional golfer

=== K ===
- Kath Dickinson, New Zealand botanist
- Kyra Dickinson (born 1993), St. Kitts and Nevis footballer

=== L ===
- L. J. Dickinson (1873–1968), American politician
- Laura A. Dickinson, American law professor
- Laura Elsie Dickinson (born 1979), American actor and musician
- Lavinia Norcross Dickinson (1833–1899), Younger sister of American poet Emily Dickinson
- Leo Dickinson (born 1946), British mountaineer and filmmaker
- Leonard R. Dickinson (1898–1994), American politician
- Liam Dickinson (born 1985), English footballer
- Lowes Cato Dickinson (1819–1908), English painter
- Luren Dickinson (1859–1943), American politician
- Luther Dickinson (born 1973), American guitarist & singer

=== M ===
- Mae Dickinson (1933–2017), Indiana state legislator
- Maggie Dickinson (1894–1949), Australian ballet dancer
- Margaret Rebecca Dickinson (1821–1918), British botanical artist
- Mark Dickinson (born 1999), English boxer
- Mark Dickinson (trade unionist) (born 1962), British trade union leader
- Marshe Dickinson (1703–1765), British politician
- Martin Dickinson (born 1963), English footballer
- Marvin M. Dickinson (1877–1951), American football and baseball player
- Mary Lowe Dickinson (1839–1914), American fiction writer, poet, editor, educator
- Mary Norris Dickinson (1740–1803), American landowner
- Matt Dickinson (journalist) (born 1968), English sports journalist
- Matt Dickinson, British filmmaker
- Maude Dickinson (1868–1933), British inventor and scientist
- Michael Dickinson (horseman) (born 1950), British jockey and trainer
- Michael Dickinson (biologist) (born 1963), American biologist
- Michael Dickinson (artist) (1950–2020), British artist
- Michelle Dickinson (born 1978), New Zealand nanotechnologist and science educator
- Moss Kent Dickinson (1822–1897), Canadian politician

=== N ===
- Nate Dickinson (1932–2011), American biologist
- Nathaniel Dickinson (pioneer), 17th century North American settler

=== O ===
- Obed Dickinson (1818–1892), Oregon pioneer
- Oliver Booth Dickinson (1857–1939), American judge
- Oliver Dickinson (born 1980), British and French film director

=== P ===
- Parnell Dickinson (born 1953), American football player
- Patric Dickinson (officer of arms) (born 1950), English genealogist
- Patric Dickinson (1914–1994), British poet, translator, and playwright
- Patrick Dickinson (1919–1984), English cricketer
- Peter Dickinson (1927–2015), English author & poet
- Peter Dickinson (musician) (1934–2023), English composer
- Peter Dickinson (architect) (1925–1961), British-Canadian architect
- Philemon Dickinson (1739–1809), American soldier
- Philippa Dickinson (born 1955), British publisher
- Preston Dickinson (1889–1930), American artist

=== Q ===
- Q. Todd Dickinson (1952–2020), American lawyer

=== R ===
- Rachel Dickinson (born 1998), English cricketer
- Rebecca Dickinson (1738–1815), American gownmaker
- Rick Dickinson (1956–2018), British industrial designer known for his work on computers
- Rick Dickinson (politician) (born 1953), American politician
- Riley Dickinson (born 2002), American racing driver
- Rob Dickinson (born 1965), British musician
- Robert Dickinson (lighting designer) (born 1954), English TV lighting designer
- Robert Dickinson (athlete) (1901–1981), British high jumper
- Robert Dickinson (British Columbia politician) (1835–1889), Canadian politician
- Robert Dickinson (businessman), 19th century English businessman
- Robert E. Dickinson (1940–2026), American meteorologist and geoscientist
- Robert Edmund Dickinson (1862–1947), English banker and politician
- Robert Latou Dickinson (1861–1950), American obstetrician
- Rod Dickinson (born 1965), British artist
- Rodolphus Dickinson (1797–1849), American politician
- Roger Dickinson (born 1950), American politician
- Roscoe G. Dickinson (1894–1945), American chemist
- Ross Dickinson (1903–1978), American painter
- Roy Dickinson (born 1956), GB international rugby league footballer and coach

=== S ===
- Sam Dickinson (rugby union) (born 1985), English rugby union player
- Sam Dickinson (triathlete) (born 1997), English triathlete
- Sam Dickinson (ice hockey) (born 2006), Canadian ice hockey player
- Sandra Dickinson (born 1948), British actress
- Sebastian Dickinson (1815–1878), English politician
- Seth Dickinson, American fantasy and science fiction writer
- Sidney Dickinson (1890–1980), American painter
- Spencer Dickinson (politician) (born 1943), American politician
- Stanley Dickinson (1890–1972), English cricketer
- Stirling Dickinson (1909–1998), American painter
- Stuart Dickinson (born 1968), Australian former Rugby union referee
- Susan E. Dickinson (1832–1915), American journalist
- Susan Huntington Gilbert Dickinson (1830–1913), American writer, poet, traveler, and editor
- Susanna Dickinson (1814–1883), American survivor of the Battle of the Alamo
- Suzie Dickinson (1955–2018), Australian singer
- Sydney Dickinson (1906–1984), English footballer

=== T ===
- Tammy Dickinson (born 1973), American attorney
- Tania Dickinson (born 1946), British archaeologist
- Ted Dickinson (1914–2003), English cricketer
- Terence Dickinson (1943–2023), Canadian astronomer
- Thomas R. Dickinson, United States Army general
- Thorold Dickinson (1903–1984), British film maker
- Tim Dickinson (born 1901), American political correspondent
- Tom Dickinson (cricketer) (1931–2018), Australian cricketer
- Tom Dickinson (American football) (1897–1999), American football player
- Tony Dickinson (born 1944), British psychologist
- Townsend Dickinson (1795–1851), American judge
- Travis Dickinson (born 1988), English boxer
- Tyla Dickinson (born 2001), English footballer
- Tyler Dickinson (born 1996), English rugby league footballer

=== V ===
- V. Earl Dickinson (1924–2006), American politician
- Valjean Dickinson (1929–1990), American politician
- Velvalee Dickinson (1893–1980), US spy for Imperial Japan

=== W ===
- Wally Dickinson (1895–1984), English footballer
- Walter George Burnett Dickinson (1858–1914), British veterinary surgeon
- Wells S. Dickinson (1828–1892), American politician
- William Austin Dickinson (1829–1895), American lawyer
- William Boyd Dickinson (1908–1978), American journalist
- William Croft Dickinson (1897–1963), British historian and author
- William Dickinson (Rastall) (1756–1822), English topographer and legal writer
- William Dickinson (1771–1837), English politician
- William Dickinson (1745–1806), British Member of Parliament
- William Dickinson (architect) (1670s–1724), English architect
- William Dickinson (engraver) (1746–1823), English mezzotint engraver
- William Dickinson (cricketer) (1889–1948), Welsh cricketer and British Army officer
- William Howship Dickinson (1832–1913), British doctor
- William L. Dickinson (1925–2008), American politician
- William R. Dickinson (1931–2015), American geologist
- Willoughby Dickinson, 1st Baron Dickinson (1859–1943), British politician
- Wyndell Dickinson (born 1965), American sprinter

=== Pseudonyms and aliases ===
- Angie Dickinson, born 'Angeline Brown' in 1931, United States
- Christine Arnothy (1930–2015), Hungary, used the pen name 'William Dickinson'

== Given name ==
- Dickinson Bishop (1887–1961), American businessman, World War I veteran and Titanic survivor
- Dickinson R. Debevoise (1924–2015), American judge
- Dickinson S. Miller (1868–1963), American philosopher
- Dickinson W. Richards (1895–1973), American physician and physiologist

== See also ==
- Dickinson (disambiguation)
