= William Dickinson =

William Dickinson may refer to:

== People ==
(The list is sorted by year of birth)

- William Dickinson (architect) (c. 1670–1724), English architect
- William Dickinson (1745–1806), British Member of Parliament for Great Marlow 1768–1774, Rye 1777–1790 and Somerset 1796–1806
- William Dickinson (engraver) (1746–1826), English mezzotint engraver
- William Dickinson (Rastall) (1756–1822), English topographer and legal writer
- William Dickinson (1771–1837), British Member of Parliament for Ilchester 1796–1802, Lostwithiel 1802–1806 and Somerset 1806–1831
- William Austin Dickinson (1829–1895), American lawyer
- William Howship Dickinson (1832–1913), British doctor
- William Preston Dickinson (1889–1930), American modern artist
- William Dickinson (cricketer) (1889–1948), Welsh cricketer and British Army officer
- William Croft Dickinson (1897–1963), English historian and author
- William Boyd Dickinson (1908–1978), American war correspondent
- William Louis Dickinson (1925–2008), American politician
- William R. Dickinson (1931–2015), American geologist

=== Pseudonyms ===
- William Dickinson, a pseudonym used by Christine Arnothy (born 1930), French writer

== Places ==
- William L. Dickinson High School, in Jersey City, New Jersey
