= Dickenson (surname) =

Dickenson is an English patronymic surname, a variant of Dickinson, meaning "son of Dick" (a medieval pet form of the given name Richard). Notable people with the surname include:

- Alastair Dickenson, British antiques expert
- Andrew J. Dickenson (fl. 1842–1844), American politician from Illinois
- Anthony Dickenson (born 1952), British professor of neuropharmacology
- Brennan Dickenson (born 1993), English footballer
- Chelsea Dickenson (born 1990), British travel blogger
- Craig Dickenson (born 1971), Canadian gridiron football player and coach
- Dave Dickenson (born 1973), American gridiron football coach and former player
- Donna Dickenson (born 1946), American philosopher and medical ethicist
- Edith Dickenson (1851–1903), English-born Australian journalist
- Ethel Dickenson (1880–1918), Canadian nurse
- George Dickenson (1882–1953), GB & England international rugby league footballer
- Haydn Dickenson (born 1961), British musician
- Herb Dickenson (1931–2019), Canadian ice hockey player
- Jean Dickenson (1914–1989), American singer
- Jimmy Dickenson (1908–1982), English footballer
- Joe Dickenson, English footballer
- John Dickenson (author) (1570–1636), English author
- John Dickenson (Canadian politician) (1847–1932), Canadian politician
- John Calhoun Dickenson (1815–1890), American politician
- John W. Dickenson (1934–2023), Australian inventor
- Kevin Dickenson (born 1962), English footballer
- Lou Dickenson (born 1982), Canadian ice hockey player
- Lucy Dickenson (1980–2012), Welsh humanitarian, social entrepreneur and singer-songwriter
- Margaret Dickenson, Canadian cookbook author
- Mitchell Dickenson (born 1996), English footballer
- Paul Dickenson (1949–2024), English hammer thrower
- Ralph Dickenson (born 1948), Canadian baseball player and coach
- Russell E. Dickenson (1923–2008), American government official
- Samuel Dickenson (1733–1823), British botanist
- Sarah Dickenson (1868–1954), British trade unionist and feminist
- Sue Dickenson (born 1945), American politician
- Thomas Dickenson (fl. c. 1650), English merchant and politician
- Vic Dickenson (1906–1984), American jazz musician
- William J. Dickenson (1827–1907), American lawyer and politician

== See also ==
- Dickenson (disambiguation)
