= Anthony Dickinson =

Anthony Dickinson may refer to:

- Tony Dickinson (Anthony J. Dickinson, born 1944), British psychologist
- Anthony R. Dickinson (born 1960), British neuroscientist
- Mark Dickinson (trade unionist) (Anthony Mark Dickinson, born 1962), British trade union leader

== See also ==
- Anthony Dickenson, British professor of neuropharmacology
