= Dickenson =

Dickenson may refer to:

- Dickenson (surname), list of notable people with the surname
- Dickenson County, Virginia, United States
- Dickenson Hill Road, Singapore
- CS Dickenson, see USS Kailua (IX-71)
- Dickinson College, a private liberal arts college in Carlisle, Pennsylvania, United States

== See also ==
- Dickinson (disambiguation)
  - Dickinson (name)
