= John Dickinson (disambiguation) =

John Dickinson (1732–1808) was a Founding Father of the United States active in Delaware and Pennsylvania.

John Dickinson may also refer to:

- John Dean Dickinson (1767–1841), lawyer and U.S. representative from New York
- John Dickinson (inventor) (1782–1869), founder of the paper mills at Apsley and Nash Mills in Hertfordshire, England
- John Dickinson (judge) (1806–1882), judge and politician in colonial New South Wales
- John Dickinson (writer) (1815–1876), English writer on India
- John W. Dickinson (1825–1901), American educator
- John Dickinson (magistrate) (1848/9–1933), chief magistrate of the Metropolitan Police Courts until 1920
- John Dickinson (bishop) (1901–1993), Assistant English bishop of Melanesia
- John Dickinson (physician) (1927–2015), British physician and clinical researcher
- John Dickinson (rugby league) (1934–2021), rugby league footballer of the 1950s for England, and St Helens RLFC
- John Dickinson (author) (born 1962), English author of young adult novels

== See also ==
- John Dickenson (disambiguation)
- Jonathan Dickinson (disambiguation)
- John Dickinson High School, in Milltown, Delaware
