= Dickinson =

Dickinson may refer to:

== People ==
- Dickinson (name)

== Place names ==
=== United States ===
- Dickinson, Minnesota, a ghost town
- Dickinson, Broome County, New York, a town
- Dickinson, Franklin County, New York, a town
- Dickinson, North Dakota, a city
- Dickinson, Texas, a city
- Dickinson, West Virginia, unincorporated
- Dickinson township, Cumberland County, Pennsylvania, a township
- Dickinson County, Iowa
- Dickinson County, Kansas
- Dickinson County, Michigan
- Jonathan Dickinson State Park, southeast Florida
- Port Dickinson, New York, a village

=== Canada ===
- Dickinson's Landing, Ontario, ghost town

== Education ==
=== United States ===
- Dickinson College, liberal arts college in Carlisle, Pennsylvania
- Dickinson High School (Dickinson, North Dakota)
- John Dickinson High School, Wilmington, Delaware
- Dickinson School of Law, Carlisle, Pennsylvania
- Dickinson State University, public university in Dickinson, North Dakota
- Fairleigh Dickinson University, university in New Jersey

== Other uses ==
- Becton Dickinson, American medical equipment manufacturer
- Dickinson (TV series), an American comedy TV series, broadcast 2019–2021
- Dickinson (crater), a crater in the northeastern Atalanta Region of Venus

== See also ==
- Dickenson (disambiguation)
- Justice Dickinson (disambiguation)
