= Jacob Dickinson =

Jacob Dickinson may refer to:

- Jacob M. Dickinson (1851–1928), United States Secretary of War, 1909–1911
- Jacob Alan Dickinson (1911–1971), American attorney in Kansas
