= Francis Dickinson =

Francis Dickinson may refer to:

- Francis Dickinson (1632–1704), soldier who participated in the English invasion of Jamaica in 1655
- Francis Dickinson (politician) (1813–1890), English Conservative Member of Parliament (MP) for West Somerset 1841–1847
- Francis Dickinson (1830–1898), soldier in the Charge of the Light Brigade, buried at Sheffield General Cemetery
