= Arthur Dickinson =

Arthur Dickinson may refer to:

- Arthur Dickinson (football manager), manager and honorary secretary of Sheffield Wednesday
- Arthur Dickinson (footballer), English footballer
- Sir Arthur Lowes Dickinson, British chartered accountant
- Arthur Harold Dickinson, British colonial police officer
