= Frances Dickinson =

Frances Dickinson may refer to:

- Frances Dickinson (musician), New Zealand-based musician and vocal coach
- Frances Dickinson (physician) (1856–1945), American physician and clubwoman
- Frances Dickinson (prior) (1755–1830), British prioress
