= Senator Dickinson =

Senator Dickinson may refer to:

== Members of the United States Senate ==
- Daniel S. Dickinson (1800–1866), U.S. Senator from New York from 1844 to 1851
- Lester J. Dickinson (1873–1968), U.S. Senator from Iowa from 1931 to 1937
- Philemon Dickinson (1739–1809), U.S. Senator from New Jersey from 1790 to 1793

== United States state senate members ==
- Andrew B. Dickinson (1801–1873), New York State Senate
- Clement C. Dickinson (1849–1938), Missouri State Senate
- Fairleigh Dickinson Jr. (1919–1996), New Jersey State Senate
- Francke W. Dickinson (1849–1922), Massachusetts State Senate
- James Dickinson (Nebraska politician) (1917–2004), Nebraska State Senate
- James Shelton Dickinson (1818–1882), Alabama State Senate
- Jesse Dickinson, Indiana State Senate
- John Dickinson (1732–1808), Delaware State Senate
- Luren Dickinson (1859–1943), Michigan State Senate
- Wells S. Dickinson (1828–1892), New York State Senate
