= Charles Dickinson =

Charles Dickinson may refer to:

- Charles Dickinson (scientist) (1755–1827), English magistrate and amateur scientist
- Charles Dickinson (planter) (1780–1806), American planter fatally wounded by Andrew Jackson
- Charles Dickinson (author) (born 1951), American novelist
- Charles Dickinson (bishop) (1792–1842), Anglican bishop
- Charles Dickinson (priest) (1871–1930), Archdeacon of Bristol
- Charles Dickinson (footballer) (1881–1955), Argentine footballer
- Charles M. Dickinson (1842–1924), American lawyer, newspaper editor, and diplomat
- Charles Edgar Dickinson (1908–1964), American landscape architect and educator

== See also ==
- Charles Dickinson West (1847–1908), Irish mechanical engineer and naval architect
