= Stan Dragland =

Canadian novelist (1942–2022)

Stan Dragland CM
- Born: Stanley Louis Dragland; December 2, 1942; Calgary, Alberta, Canada
- Died: August 2, 2022 (aged 79); Trinity, Newfoundland and Labrador, Canada
- Education: Queen's University; University of Alberta
- Occupation: Writer
- Writing career
- Language: English
- Genres: Fiction, poetry, literary criticism, essays
- Notable works: Floating Voice: Duncan Campbell Scott and the Literature of Treaty 9; Peckertracks; Apocrypha: Further Journeys
- Notable awards: Newfoundland and Labrador Rogers Cable Non-Fiction Award

Stanley Louis Dragland CM (December 2, 1942 – August 2, 2022) was a Canadian novelist, poet and literary critic. A longtime professor of English literature at the University of Western Ontario, he was most noted for his 1994 critical study Floating Voice: Duncan Campbell Scott and the Literature of Treaty 9, which played a key role in the contemporary reevaluation of the legacy of poet Duncan Campbell Scott in light of his role as deputy superintendent of the Department of Indian Affairs.

== Career ==
Born and raised in Calgary, Alberta, Dragland was educated at the University of Alberta and Queen's University. While teaching at Western, he was a founder of the poetry publisher Brick Books and the literary magazine Brick.

His first novel, Peckertracks, was a shortlisted finalist for the Books in Canada First Novel Award. He won the Newfoundland and Labrador Rogers Cable Non-Fiction Award in 2005 for his memoir Apocrypha: Further Journeys, and he was a shortlisted finalist for the E. J. Pratt Poetry Award in 2007 for Stormy Weather: Foursomes.

He wrote the forewords for the New Canadian Library editions of Scott's In the Village of Viger and Other Stories and Leonard Cohen's Beautiful Losers.

== Personal life ==
During his academic career he was married to Marnie Parsons, a fellow professor at Western. The couple later separated. After his retirement, Dragland moved to St. John's, Newfoundland and Labrador, where he continued his writing career and remarried to Beth Follett, the publisher of Pedlar Press.

Dragland was made a member of the Order of Canada in 2021. Dragland died in Trinity, Newfoundland and Labrador during a hike on August 2, 2022, at the age of 79.

== Books ==
- Wilson MacDonald's Western Tour, 1923-4 (1975)
- Peckertracks (1978)
- Approaches to the Work of James Reaney (1983)
- Simon Jesse's Journey (1983)
- Journeys Through Bookland (1985)
- The Bees of the Invisible (1991)
- Floating Voice: Duncan Campbell Scott and the Literature of Treaty 9 (Anansi, 1994) ISBN 0887845517
- New Life in Dark Seas (2000)
- 12 Bars (2002)
- Apocrypha: Further Journeys (2003)
- Stormy Weather: Foursomes (2005)
- Hard-Headed and Big-Hearted: Writing Newfoundland (2006)
- The Drowned Lands (2008)
- Deep Too (2013)
- The Bricoleur and His Sentences (2014)
- Witness: Poetry and Prose of Joanne Page (2015)
- Strangers & Others: Newfoundland Essays (Pedlar Press, 2015) ISBN 9781897141700
- Strangers & Others: The Great Eastern (Pedlar Press, 2016) ISBN 978-1-897141-77-9
- Gerald Squires (2017)
- James Reaney On the Grid (Porcupine's Quill, 2022) ISBN 9780889844520
