= Linda Spalding =

Canadian writer and editor (born 1943)

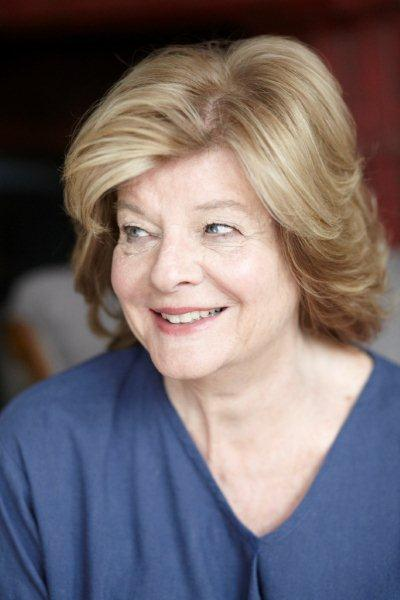
- Born: Linda Dickinson; 25 June 1943 (age 83); Topeka, Kansas, U.S.
- Occupation: Novelist
- Spouse(s): Philip Spalding; Michael Ondaatje
- Children: 2 (including Esta Spalding)
- Writing career
- Notable work: A Dark Place in the Jungle
- Website: www.lindaspalding.com

Linda Spalding (née Dickinson; June 25, 1943) is a Canadian writer and editor. Born in Topeka, Kansas, the daughter of Jacob Alan Dickinson and Edith Senner, she lived in Mexico and Hawaii before moving to Toronto, Ontario in 1982.

She has two daughters, Esta and Kristin Spalding, from her first marriage to photographer Philip Spalding. Spalding later married Canadian novelist Michael Ondaatje; Linda, Esta and Michael are also on the editorial board of the national literary magazine, Brick.

Spalding's work has been honoured numerous times; her non-fiction work, The Follow, was shortlisted for the Trillium Book Award and the Writers' Trust Non-Fiction Prize. She has since received the Harbourfront Festival Prize for her contribution to the Canadian literary community and, in 2012, the Governor-General's Literary Award for her novel, The Purchase.

Spalding has worked as a professor of English and writing at the University of Hawaii, York University, the University of Guelph, Brown University (where she was writer-in-residence in 1991), the University of Toronto and Ryerson University. She has also taught creative writing at Humber College's School for Writers. Prior to this, she has worked as a manager for Hawaii Public Television and as the director of a child care services agency in Kailua, Hawaii.

== Bibliography ==
- Daughters of Captain Cook (1987)
- The Paper Wife (1994)
- The Follow / A Dark Place in the Jungle: Following Leakey's Last Angel into Borneo (1999)
- Riska (1999)
- The Brick Reader (1999) (edited with Michael Ondaatje)
- Lost Classics (2000, Knopf Canada; ISBN 0-676-97299-3) (edited with Michael Redhill, Esta Spalding and Michael Ondaatje)
- Mere (2001, HarperFlamingo Canada; ISBN 0-00-225538-3) (with Esta Spalding)
- Who Named The Knife (2005)
- The Purchase (2012)
- A Reckoning (2017)
