= Frances Minto Elliot =

English writer

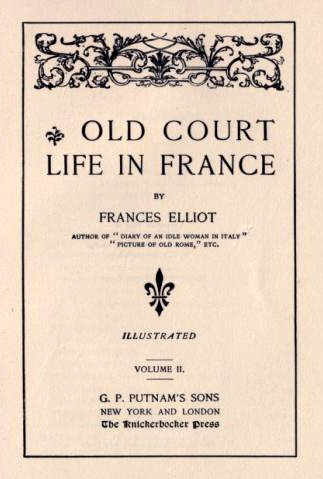
1893 edition of Old Court Life in France by Frances Minto Elliot

Frances Minto Elliot (1820–1898) was a prolific English writer, primarily of non-fiction works on the social history of Italy, Spain, and France and travelogues. She also wrote three novels and published art criticism and gossipy, sometimes scandalous, sketches for The Art Journal, Bentley's Miscellany, and The New Monthly Magazine, often under the pseudonym, "Florentia". Largely forgotten now, she was very popular in her day, with multiple re-printings of her books in both Europe and the United States. Elliot had a wide circle of literary friends including Charles Dickens, Anthony Trollope and Wilkie Collins. Collins dedicated his 1872 novel, Poor Miss Finch, to her, and much of the content in Marian Holcolmbe's conversations in The Woman in White is said to be based on her.

== Biography ==
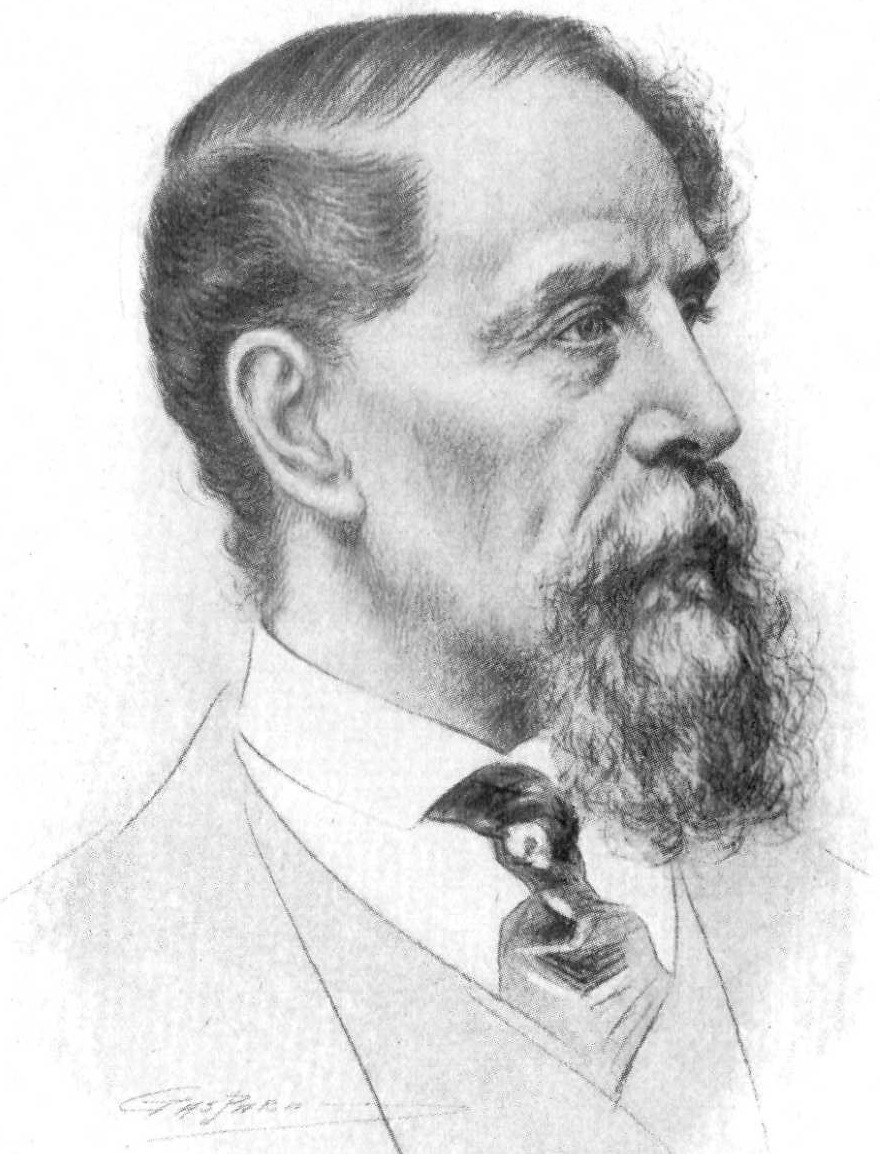
Charles Dickens, a close friend of Frances Elliot, who tried unsuccessfully to mediate in her separation from Gilbert Elliot

Frances Vickriss Dickinson was born at Farley Hill Court in the Berkshire village of Swallowfield on 6 March 1820. She was the only child from Catherine Allingham's marriage to Charles Dickinson of Queen Charlton Manor, Somerset. She was an 18-year-old heiress when her life began to take its somewhat complicated path. On 8 October 1838, she married John Edward Geils from Glasgow in the Swallowfield church. The couple then departed for Scotland, but the marriage proved to be a disaster. After seven years, she left her husband and returned to Farley Hill Court, alleging his adultery with two of their maids, and violence towards her. He, in turn, tried to deny her access to their four daughters and sued her for the "restitution of his conjugal rights". In 1855 she was finally able to obtain a divorce in the Scottish courts and regain custody of the children, although the case had been fought all the way to the House of Lords before it was finalised. Despite the fact that she was the innocent party in the divorce, she found herself socially ostracised from the upper-class circles in which she had once moved and travelled to Italy, where she was eventually to spend a large part of her life. According to the 1896 edition of her book, Roman Gossip, one of the daughters from her first marriage (also named Frances) later married the Italian archaeologist and art historian, Marchese Chigi.

During the protracted divorce proceedings, she worked as a journalist for several London magazines and became friends with Wilkie Collins, who also wrote for Bentley's Miscellany. It was through Collins that she met Charles Dickens. Collins had asked her to play in the 1857 amateur performances of The Frozen Deep, a play he had co-written with Dickens. In December 1863 she married the Very Rev. Gilbert Elliot, Dean of Bristol, a widower twenty years her senior with three children from his first wife. However, within three years, that marriage was also in serious trouble. She eventually left Elliot and returned to Italy, although the couple were never legally separated or divorced. She continued to use her married name as an author, incorporating "Minto" for good measure, especially in British publications. Gilbert Elliot had family connections with the Earls of Minto – her 1873 book, Old Court Life in France, is dedicated to "My niece The Countess of Minto".

Francis Minto Elliot died in Siena on 26 October 1898, aged 78. She is buried in the Protestant Cemetery in Rome near the grave of her second daughter, Mary Lucy, who had died in Rome in 1855 at the age of 13.

== Selected works ==
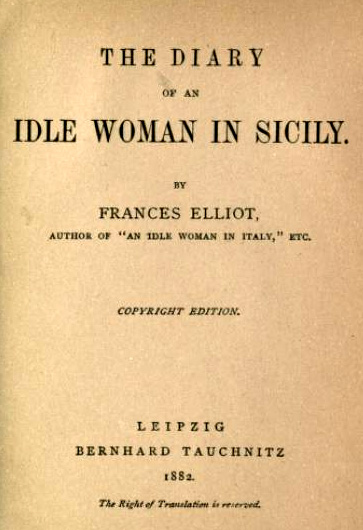
1882 edition of Diary of an Idle Woman in Sicily by Frances Elliot

Frances Elliot's work was published under a variety of names during her lifetime: "Frances Geils", "Frances Vickriss Dickinson", "Florentia", "Frances Elliot", "Mrs. Elliot", and "Frances Minto Elliot". In addition to numerous articles in magazines and journals, she wrote the following books:

Non-fiction

- Old Court Life in France. London: Ward & Downey, 1886
- Old Court Life in Spain. London: Chapman & Hall, 1893
- Pictures of Old Rome. London: Chapman & Hall, 1872
- Roman Gossip. London: J. Murray, 1894
- Diary of an Idle Woman in Italy. London: Chapman & Hall, 1871
- Diary of an Idle Woman in Spain. Leipzig: Bernhard Tauchnitz, 1882
- Diary of an Idle Woman in Sicily. Leipzig: Bernhard Tauchnitz, 1882
- Diary of an Idle Woman in Constantinople. London: J. Murray, 1893

Fiction

- The Italians: A Novel. New York: D. Appleton, 1875
- The Red Cardinal: A Romance. London: F. V. White, 1884
- The Ill-tempered Cousin. London: F. V. White, 1885
- The Story of Sophia. Leipzig: Bernard Tauchnitz, 1891.

== In popular culture ==
Elliot was the subject of Wendy Parkins’ 2024 novel The Defiance of Frances Dickinson.
