= Justice Dickerson =

Justice Dickerson may refer to:

- Jonathan G. Dickerson (1811–1878), associate justice of the Maine Supreme Judicial Court
- Mahlon Dickerson (1770–1853), associate justice of the New Jersey Supreme Court

== See also ==
- Judge Dickerson (disambiguation)
- Justice Dickinson (disambiguation)
