= John Dickenson =

John Dickenson may refer to:

- John Dickenson (author) (c. 1570–1636), English author
- John Dickenson (Canadian politician) (1847–1932)
- John Calhoun Dickenson (1815–1890), Virginia planter and politician
- John W. Dickenson (1934–2023), Australian inventor

== See also ==
- John Dickinson (disambiguation)
