= Clerk of works =

Construction occupation

A clerk of works or clerk of the works (CoW) is employed by an architect or a client on a construction site. The role is primarily to represent the interests of the client in regard to ensuring that the quality of both materials and workmanship are in accordance with the design information such as specification and engineering drawings, in addition to recognized quality standards. The role is defined in standard forms of contract such as those published by the Joint Contracts Tribunal. Clerks of works are also the most highly qualified non-commissioned tradesmen in the Royal Engineers. The qualification can be held in three specialisms: electrical, mechanical and construction.

Historically, the clerk of works was employed by the architect on behalf of a client, or by local authorities to oversee public works. The clerk of works can also be employed by the client (state body/local authority/private client) to monitor design and build projects where the traditional role of the architect is within the design and build project team.

Maître d'oeuvre (master of work) is a term used in many Francophone jurisdictions for the office that carries out this job in major projects; the Channel Tunnel project had such an office. In Italy, the term used is direttore dei lavori (manager of the works).

== Origins of the title ==
The job title is believed to derive from the 13th century when monks and priests (i.e. "clerics" or "clerks") were accepted as being more literate than the builders of the age and took on the responsibility of supervising the works associated with the erection of churches and other religious property. As craftsmen and masons became more educated they in turn took on the role, but the title did not change. By the 19th century the role had expanded to cover the majority of building works, and the clerk of works was drawn from experienced tradesmen who had wide knowledge and understanding of the building process.

== The role ==
The role, to this day, is based on the impartiality of the clerk of works in ensuring that value for money for the client - rather than the contractor - is achieved through rigorous and detailed inspection of materials and workmanship throughout the building process. In many cases, the traditional title has been discarded to comply with modern trends, such as site inspector, architectural inspector and quality inspector, but the requirement for the role remains unchanged since the origins of the title.

The clerk of works is a very isolated profession on site. He/she is the person that must ensure quality of both materials and workmanship and, to this end, must be absolutely impartial and independent in decisions and judgments. He/she cannot normally, by virtue of the quality role, be employed by the contractor - only the client, normally by the architect on behalf of the client. His/her role is not to judge, but simply to report all occurrences that are relevant to the role.

Clerks of works are either on site all the time or make regular visits. They must be vigilant in their inspections of a large range of technical aspects of the work. This involves:

- making sure that work is carried out to the client's standards, specification, correct materials, workmanship and schedule
- becoming familiar with all the relevant drawings and written instructions, checking them and using them as a reference when inspecting work
- making visual inspections
- taking measurements and samples on site to make sure that the work and the materials meet the specifications and quality standards
- being familiar with legal requirements and checking that the work complies with them.
- having a working knowledge of health and safety legislation and bringing any shortfalls observed to the attention of the resident engineer.
- advising the contractor about certain aspects of the work, particularly when something has gone wrong, but this advice should not be interpreted as an instruction

== Notable clerks of works ==
- Geoffrey Chaucer (1343–1400) was an English author, poet, philosopher, bureaucrat, courtier, diplomat and Clerk of the King's Works.
- John Louth was appointed first clerk of works of the Board of Ordnance by Henry V in 1414 along with Nicholas Merbury, Master of Ordnance. The Royal Artillery, Royal Engineers and Royal Army Ordnance Corps can all trace their origins to this date.
- William of Wykeham, Lord Chancellor and Bishop of Winchester (1323–1404) was Clerk of the King's Works.
- William Dickinson, Clerk of the King's Works from 1660 to his death in 1702 and Controller Clerk at Windsor Castle. His son, William Dickinson, was architect and Deputy Surveyor of Westminster Abbey under Sir Christopher Wren.
- James Nedeham or Needham, was appointed Clerk of the King's Works on 30 April 1530, and during that and the two following years devised and superintended the building alterations at Esher, York Place, and Westminster Palace. In September 1532, he was engaged in the "re-edifying" of St. Thomas's Tower within the Tower of London, and was occupied on that and other works in the Tower during the next three years. In April 1533, he was appointed by grant Clerk and Overseer of the King's Works in England.

== The Institute of Clerks of Works and Construction Inspectorate of Great Britain Incorporated ==
Coat of arms of the Institute of Clerks of Works of Great Britain
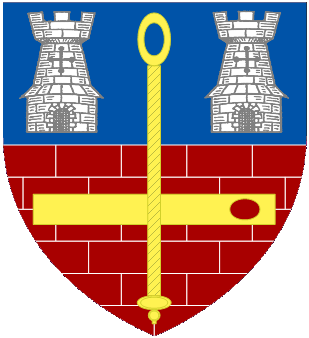
- Crest: On a wreath Or and Azure out of the battlements of a tower Argent masoned Sable between two branches of laurel Vert fructed Or an owl holding in the dexter claw a torch erect Or enflamed Proper.
- Shield: Per fesse Azure and Gules masoned Argent in chief two towers Argent masoned Sable and in base a spirit level fessewise over all a plumb line in pale Or.
- Supporters: On either side a lion paly [of four] Or and Gules gorged with a collar Argent masoned Sable pendent therefrom by a chain a six-pointed star Argent charged with a dexter hand appaume couped at the wrist Gules and resting the interior hind paw upon a block of stone Proper.
- Motto: Potestate Probitate et Vigilantia
- Granted 2 September 1964.

The ICWCI - motto: Potestate, Probitate et Vigilantia (Ability, Integrity and Vigilance) - is the professional body that supports quality construction through systematic inspection. As a membership organisation, it provides a support network of meeting centres, technical advice, publications and events to help keep members up to date with the ever-changing construction industry.

Post-nominals for members are FICWCI (Fellow), MICWCI (Member) and LICWCI (Licentiate).

=== History ===
The institute was founded in 1882 as the Clerk of Works Association, becoming the Incorporated Clerk of Works Association of Great Britain in 1903. In 1947, its name was amended again to the Institute of Clerks of Works of Great Britain Incorporated, a title it retained until 2009 when it was expanded to the Institute of Clerks of Works and Construction Inspectorate of Great Britain Incorporated.

The organisation was founded to allow those who were required to operate in isolation on site, a central organisation to look after the interests of their chosen profession, be it through association with other professional bodies, educational means or simply through social intercourse among their own peers and contemporaries. Essential to this, as the Institute developed, was the development of a central body that could lobby Parliament in relation to their profession, and the quality issues that it stands for.

Though the means of construction, training of individuals, and the way individuals are employed have changed dramatically over the years, the principles the Institute originally formed for remain sacrosanct. Experience in the many facets of the building trade is essential and, in general terms, most practitioners have come from the tools, though further third-level education in the built environment is essential.

=== 'Building on Quality' Awards ===
The Institute of Clerks of Works and Construction Inspectorate hold the biannual Building on Quality Awards, and nominations are accepted from all involved in quality site inspection regardless of whether they are members of the institute. Judging is based on the Clerk of Works' ability, his/her contribution to the projects he/she is involved with, his/her record keeping and reports, and his/her commitment to the role of Clerk of Works.

Awards given in each category are Overall Winner, Highly Commended and Commended. The Overall Winner is chosen from all categories and is widely considered the highest accolade that can be awarded to a clerk of works in recognition of his work. Newly introduced in 2013 was the Peter Wilson Memorial trophy, which has now had two deserving recipients. The trophy was donated by the Cumbria and North Lancashire Chapter to the ICWCI in memoriam of Vice President Peter Wilson FICWCI.

2019 Award Winners

- Overall Winner - David Pugh MICWCI (Audley St George's Place Retirement Village, Edgbaston)
- Peter Wilson Memorial Award - Jon Tucker (Russell Hotel, London)
- Rex S. Reynolds Memorial Award - David Bristow FICWCI (Littleport Academy, Ely)

2017 Award Winners

- Overall Winner - Joel Trimby MICWCI (Ulster Hospital redevelopment project, Northern Ireland)
- Peter Wilson Memorial Award - William Tarling FICWCI (The National Heritage Centre for Horseracing and Sporting Art, Newmarket, England)

2015 Award Winners

- Overall Winner - Trevor King MICWCI (Boldrewood Campus, University of Southampton)
- Peter Wilson Memorial Award - Roy Burke MICWCI (Stratford Halo, London)

2013 Award Winners

- Overall Winner - Frank Miller MICWCI (Twin Sails Bridge, Poole, Dorset)
- Peter Wilson Memorial Award - Anthony Smith FICWCI (Taff Bargoed Park and Lakes, Merthyr Tydfil)

2011 Award Winners:

- Overall Winner - Brian Duncan MICWCI (Hanover Lodge Outer Circle, Regent's Park, London)
- New Build / Refurbishment - Tony Hood (Mossley Hill, Newtownabbey)
- New Build - Mark Heggs MICWCI (University of Leicester)

2009 Award Winners:

- Overall Winner - Les Howard MICWCI (New Eircom Headquarters, Dublin)
- New Build – Peter McGuone FICWCI (Altnagelvin Hospital, Derry)
- Refurbishment – Peter Airey MICWCI (Eden Court Theatre, Inverness)
- New Build / Refurbishment – Allan Sherwood MICWCI (The Spa, Bridlington)
- Civil Engineering – Mike Readman FICWCI (A590 High and Low Newton Bypass, Cumbria)
- Special Judges Award – Carol Heidschuster MICWCI (Lincoln Cathedral)

=== ICWCI meeting centres ===
Cumbria and North Lancashire, Deeside, Devon and Cornwall, Dublin, East Anglia, East Midlands, East of Scotland, Gibraltar, Home Counties North, Hong Kong, Isle of Man, London (North and South), Merseyside, North Cheshire, North East, Northern, Northern Ireland, Nottingham, Scotland, South Wales, Southern, Staffordshire and District & Western Counties

=== Clerks of works in Canada ===
The earliest record of a clerk of works in Canada was John Mactaggart who was the clerk of works for the Rideau Canal project in 1826. John Mactaggart was a British civil engineer and the chief clerk of works in charge of the project, reporting to Lieutenant-Colonel John By. John Morris was a notable clerk of works in the mid-1800s, completing several notable projects such as University College, University of Toronto, (1856–59), Parliament Building, the Departmental Buildings, and Government House.

During the renovations to Pembroke City Hall, W. J. Moore was clerk of the works for the addition in 1912 and J. L. Morris for the alterations in 1914.

== See also ==
- Quality control
- Quality management system
- Quality assurance
