= Brick (magazine) =

Canadian literary magazine, founded 1977)

Brick, A Literary Journal
- Editors: Dionne Brand, David Chariandy, Laurie D. Graham, Michael Helm, Liz Johnston, Martha Sharpe, Rebecca Silver Slayter, Madeleine Thien, (Contributing editors are Teju Cole, Robert Hass, Anne McLean, Tara Quinn)(Associate editor is Rachel Gerry)(Managing editor is Orly Zebak)(Art director is Mark Byk)
- Former editors: Michael Ondaatje, Michael Redhill, Esta Spalding, Nadia Szilvassy, Stan Dragland
- Categories: Literary magazine
- Frequency: Biannually
- Publisher: Laurie D. Graham
- First issue: 1977
- Country: Canada
- Based in: Toronto
- Language: English
- Website: www.brickmag.com
- ISSN: 0382-8565

Brick, A Literary Journal is a biannual literary magazine established in 1977. It publishes literary and creative non-fiction.

== History ==
Brick was established in 1977 in London, Ontario, as a book review section in the literary magazine Applegarth's Folly, itself a product of the publishing house Applegarth Follies. Stan Dragland edited the first issue. Brick soon detached from its parent magazine (which ceased to exist by the second issue of Brick) and Dragland began sharing editorial duties with Jean McKay. The two also operated their own publishing house, Nairn, which became Brick/Nairn in 1979, and eventually Brick Books in 1981.

Brick was taken over by Michael Ondaatje and Linda Spalding in 1985. Though still formatted like a magazine, it began to transform from a book review into a much more general literary magazine, eventually focusing on literary and creative non-fiction with an emphasis on personal essays.

In 1991, Coach House Press published The Brick Reader, a three-hundred-page volume edited by Ondaatje and Spalding. It features the best of Brick writing, from 1977-1991, including works by Don DeLillo, Kazuo Ishiguro, and Alice Munro.

In Fall 2000, Brick underwent a major shift in design, undertaken by Gord Roberston. Previous issues of Brick were around the size and shape of a conventional magazine (and about sixty pages in length). The redesigned magazine (beginning with Brick 65/66) was square and altogether newly formatted, featuring a new title logo designed by Toronto artist David Bolduc (who actually designed five new title logos for the magazine; Brick irregularly cycles through them) and expanded to one hundred and seventy pages. Later issues were sometimes as large as two hundred pages. Of the redesign, Cecily Möos wrote:

I have been invited by the publisher of this now-stout organ to speak on behalf of the entire staff in welcoming you to this, the beginning of a new era for the magazine. The changes you find within and without are a result of a lengthy congress held in the magazine's headquarters concerning its future. (These deliberations were of a nature too technical to be intelligible to our readership, but those who wish to know more may send away for the minutes, collected in a sister publication entitled More Readers, More Money: How?) Suffice it to say the magazine you now hold in your hands is the fruit of these soul-searching talks. It is larger. It is easier on the eye. It has cartoons. Lest our readers in Moncton fear this is a sign of renewed Fenian raids, let me reassure them that it is simply a result of Brick now being dispensed to American readers on their own soil.

In Spring 2011, Brick underwent another redesign undertaken by Mark Byk, albeit a more minor one than before. The magazine's colour palette changed quite drastically; whereas earlier issues were fairly dark, issues 87 and onward have been white. Additionally, the magazine's typography has been completely altered.

In 2013, House of Anansi Press published The New Brick Reader, edited by Tara Quinn. Like its predecessor, The New Brick Reader collects some of the best work to appear in Brick, including works by Mavis Gallant, Dionne Brand, and Jeffrey Eugenides.

== See also ==
- List of literary magazines
