= Jonathan Dickinson (disambiguation) =

Jonathan Dickinson was a Quaker merchant, author and mayor of Philadelphia.

Jonathan Dickinson may also refer to:

- Jonathan Dickinson (New Jersey minister) (1688–1747), minister and a co-founder and first president of the College of New Jersey
- Jonathan Dickinson Sergeant (1746–1793), grandson of Jonathan Dickinson, American lawyer and politician
- Jonathan Dickinson State Park, a Florida State Park and historic site named for the Quaker merchant

== See also ==
- John Dickinson (disambiguation)
