= Zachary Bogan =

Zachary Bogan (1625–1659) was an English scholar with Biblical interests. He published with the antiquarian Francis Rous the younger, and the alchemist Edmund Dickinson. He argued for parallels between Biblical and ancient Greek literature. He also wrote purely religious works, before dying young from consumption.

== Life ==
He was born in Gatcomb, Devon, and was a fellow of Corpus Christi College, Oxford.

== Works ==
Bogan published Treatises on the Idioms of Homer and Hesiod, as compared with the Language of Scripture, and some devotional tracts. He collaborated with Francis Rous the younger on the work Archaeologiae Atticae Libri Septem (Seven books of the Attick Antiquities) in 1649.

He also co-authored some works with Thomas Godwyn and Francis Rous.
