= John M. Pearce =

Professor of psychology at Cardiff University

John Martindale Pearce FLSW FRS is an Emeritus Professor of Psychology at Cardiff University, with expertise in experimental psychology and behavioural neuroscience.

== Education ==
In 1971, Pearce received a BSc in psychology from the University of Leeds In 1976, Pearce received a DPhil in experimental psychology from the University of Sussex.

== Career and research ==
After graduating from the University of Sussex in 1976, Pearce began his academic career as a research fellow, at the University of York from 1976 to 1978, and then at the University of Cambridge from 1978 to 1980, working with Tony Dickinson. Pearce spent the following twelve years of his career working at Cardiff University, firstly working as a lecturer in psychology at University College, Cardiff, and then as a reader in the School of Psychology at University of Wales College of Cardiff until 1992.

Pearce has also been a visiting professor at Duke University, and a visiting fellow at Indiana University and the University of Canterbury.

In his research, Pearce focuses on the fundamental mechanisms of intelligence in animals, with particular emphasis placed on learning and how animals respond to features of their environment. His research projects have received funding from BBSRC, Australian Research Council and the Wellcome Trust.

== Awards and honours ==
- 2001 - Quad-L Award from the University of New Mexico for contribution to the study of learning, memory and cognition
- 2006 - Elected Fellow of the Royal Society
- 2009 - Research Award of the Alexander von Humboldt Foundation
- 2010 - Founding Fellow of the Learned Society of Wales
- 2011 - Elected Fellow of the Eastern Psychological Association
- 2012 - British Psychological Society Award for Excellence in Psychology Education
- 2012–2014 - President of the Experimental Psychology Society
