= John Nicholas Wood =

British neurobiologist

John Nicholas Wood FRS FMedSci
- Education: University of Warwick; University of Leeds
- Employer: University College London (2001–)
- Awards: Scientific Grand Prize of the NRJ Fondation
- Scientific career
- Fields: Neurobiology
- Workplaces: University College London (2001–)

John Nicholas Wood FRS is a British neurobiologist, and Head of the Molecular Nociception Group, at University College London.

== Life ==
John N. Wood B.Sc., M.Sc., Ph.D., D.Sc., FRS is a British neuroscientist. He graduated from the University of Leeds and went on to study virology at the University of Warwick. In 1976, he joined the Institut Pasteur as a postdoctoral fellow under Luc Montagnier, where he worked on interferons. He later transitioned to neuroscience after meeting Tom Jessell. Wood subsequently spent twelve years in industry, working at the Wellcome Foundation and the Sandoz Institute.

In March 1994, Wood joined University College London. In 1996, together with Armen Akopian, he cloned a new sensory neuron–specific sodium channel, Nav1.8, which exhibits unusual pharmacology and plays a significant role in peripheral pain pathways. Subsequent studies demonstrated that this channel was required for normal pain perception in mice, both through the use of antisense oligonucleotides and knockout mice. Nav1.8 is also the target of Suzetrigine (Journavx), a non-opioid human analgesic developed by Vertex Pharmaceuticals and approved by the U.S. Food and Drug Administration (FDA) in 2025.

In 1995, Akopian, Chen and Wood identified an ATP-gated ion channel in sensory neurons, now known as P2X₃. Knockout studies later revealed a role for this channel in somatosensation. P2X₃ is the target of Gefapixant (Lyfnua), a drug approved by the European Medicines Agency (EMA) (EMEA/H/C/005476) for the treatment of chronic cough, though not approved by the FDA.

Akopian and Wood also identified acid-sensing ion channels (ASICs), which have been implicated in pain perception. Their function is consistent with the analgesic effects of Mambalgin, a peptide isolated from black mamba venom by Lazdunski’s team in France.

Later research by Nassar and Wood showed that Nav1.7, a broadly expressed sodium channel, is critical for pain perception, as deletion in subsets of mouse sensory neurons abolished nociception. In humans, Fertleman and Wood linked paroxysmal extreme pain disorder to gain-of-function mutations in Nav1.7 that reduce channel inactivation. Cox, Woods and Wood later demonstrated that loss-of-function mutations in Nav1.7 lead to congenital insensitivity to pain in otherwise normal individuals. Embryonic deletion of Nav1.7 activates endogenous opioid pathways, blocking nociceptive neurotransmitter release. However, pharmacological Nav1.7 antagonists have produced unacceptable autonomic side effects. More recently, Wood showed that embryonic Nav1.7 deletion induces compensatory sodium channel expression that prevents lethality in mice. Although Nav1.7 is essential for human pain, its widespread physiological role presents major challenges for drug development targeting this channel.

In 2009, Wood was elected a Fellow of the Royal Society and Fellow of the Academy of Medical Sciences.

== See also ==
Prof. Anthony Dickenson
