= Judge Dickerson =

Judge Dickerson may refer to:

- Mahlon Dickerson (1770–1853), judge of the United States District Court for the District of New Jersey
- Philemon Dickerson (1788–1862), judge of the United States District Court for the District of New Jersey

== See also ==
- Justice Dickerson (disambiguation)
