= Haydn Dickenson =

British musician

- Born: 1961 (age 64–65); Hertfordshire, England
- Occupations: Artist; piano teacher; former classical pianist
- Known for: Performances of contemporary piano music; collaborations with modern composers; visual art
- Notable work: EAST (album of Peter Feuchtwanger’s piano music)

Haydn Dickenson is an artist, piano teacher and former classical pianist. He was born in 1961 in Hertfordshire, UK, where he still lives.

Haydn's piano studies culminated in a period during the 1990s when he studied in London with the renowned pianist, composer, and pedagogue Peter Feuchtwanger, who became his principal influence and mentor and in whose legendary International Masterclasses he assisted. Haydn considers this episode to be the most important in his musical development

Haydn has received both public and critical acclaim across Europe and Great Britain for his performances of a wide repertoire embracing Baroque through to contemporary works. His name became particularly associated with New Music; he has collaborated closely with several notable contemporary composers including Claus Gahrn, Hans G Leonhardt, Eric Schwartz, John White, Robert Coleridge, Michael Chant and others. His name has also become linked, through many live performances, to the phenomenal compositions of Cornelius Cardew.

Haydn's album, EAST was released to acclaim with a launch recital at Leighton House, Holland Park, London, in May 2006. The album, on the Music Chamber label, features the complete Piano Music of Peter Feuchtwanger.

Tracks from EAST have been broadcast on BBC Radio 3, Classic FM, and Haydn has been a regular guest on Resonance FM, when he has discussed and performed the works of Cardew, Feuchtwanger and others.

Haydn teaches piano and theory of music from his home in Hertfordshire. Several of his former students have gone on to enjoy successful careers in music.

Alongside music, Haydn has held a lifelong passion for the visual arts. In latter years, Haydn has shifted away from piano performance, towards a separate career as an artist. His output comprises contemporary abstract work and tasteful nudes in oils, acrylic, watercolour and other media. He has exhibited widely in the UK and abroad, and has sold to clients worldwide. He is inspired by the natural world, and by spirituality and sensuality.

Haydn exhibits every Sunday on Bayswater Road, London, as part of the Open-Air Art Exhibition.
