= Tim Dickinson =

American political correspondent

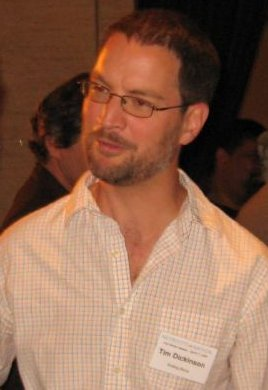
Tim Dickinson with Rolling Stone magazine at the Bay Area New Media Summit 2009.

Tim Dickinson is an American political correspondent. Based in Portland, Oregon, he is a contributing editor to Rolling Stone. His article "Machinery of Hope" about U.S. president Barack Obama's 2008 political campaign was anthologized in The Best American Political Writing 2008 (Public Affairs). His other work includes six years as an editor of Mother Jones magazine, and as a writer for Outside, Wired, and local San Francisco magazines.

== Career ==
Dickinson has more than 15 years experience as writer and editor for national magazines. While working for Mother Jones, he was the Articles Editor for six years. In 2001, he was part of the team that was awarded a National Magazine Award for General Excellence. The team was also nominated again in 2003. Dickinson is a regular guest on cable news, including appearances on MSNBC, CNN, Current, and Al Jazeera English.

== Works ==
Dickinson is co-author of "Lie-by-lie," a writing on the Iraq war. This piece was a National Magazine Award finalist in 2007 for best Interactive Feature.
