= Brian Dickinson (climber) =

American author (born 1974)

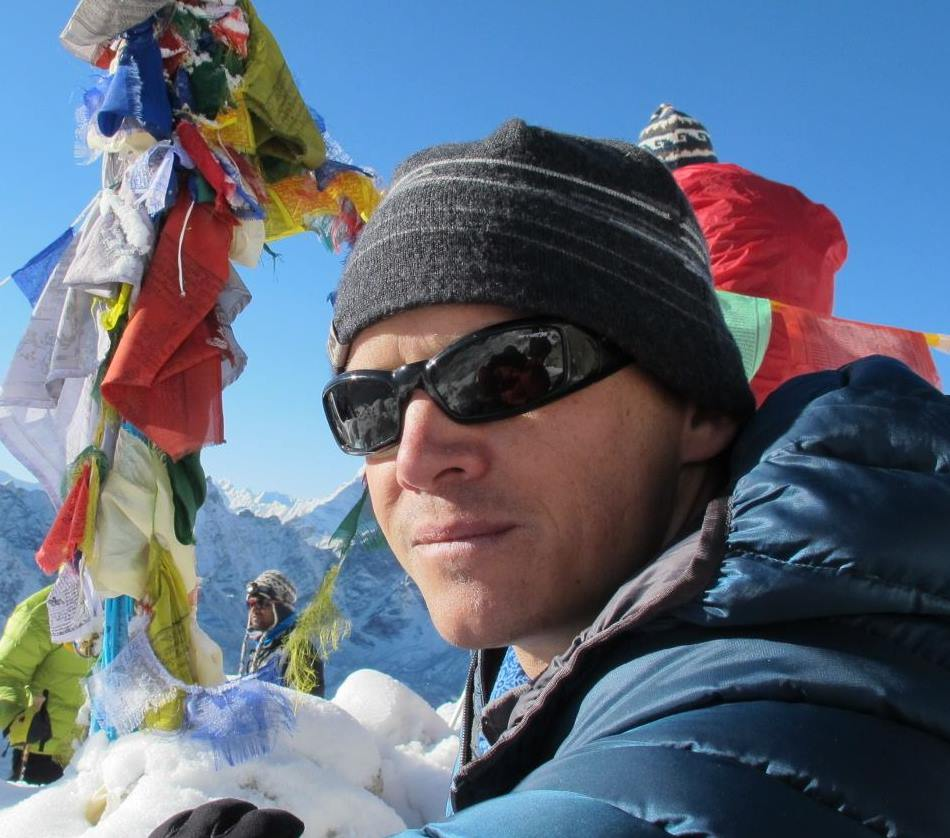
- Brian Dickinson at Kala Patthar

Personal information
- Nationality: American
- Born: 16 June 1974 (age 52)
- Website: briandickinson.net

Climbing career
- Major ascents: Everest
- Known for: Blind Descent on Everest

Brian Dickinson (born June 16, 1974) is a climber who soloed the summit of Mount Everest on May 15, 2011, after his Sherpa mountain guide became ill and went back down to high camp (South Col, 26,000'). After taking some pictures and making a radio call, Brian began his descent, but within a few feet, he became snow blind. His vision did not fully return for over a month. His descent to high camp from the summit took over seven hours instead of the expected two to three hours. Brian ran out of oxygen on his descent but made it down to the South Col, where his guide met him to help him back to his tent. Brian holds the record for the highest solo blind descent.

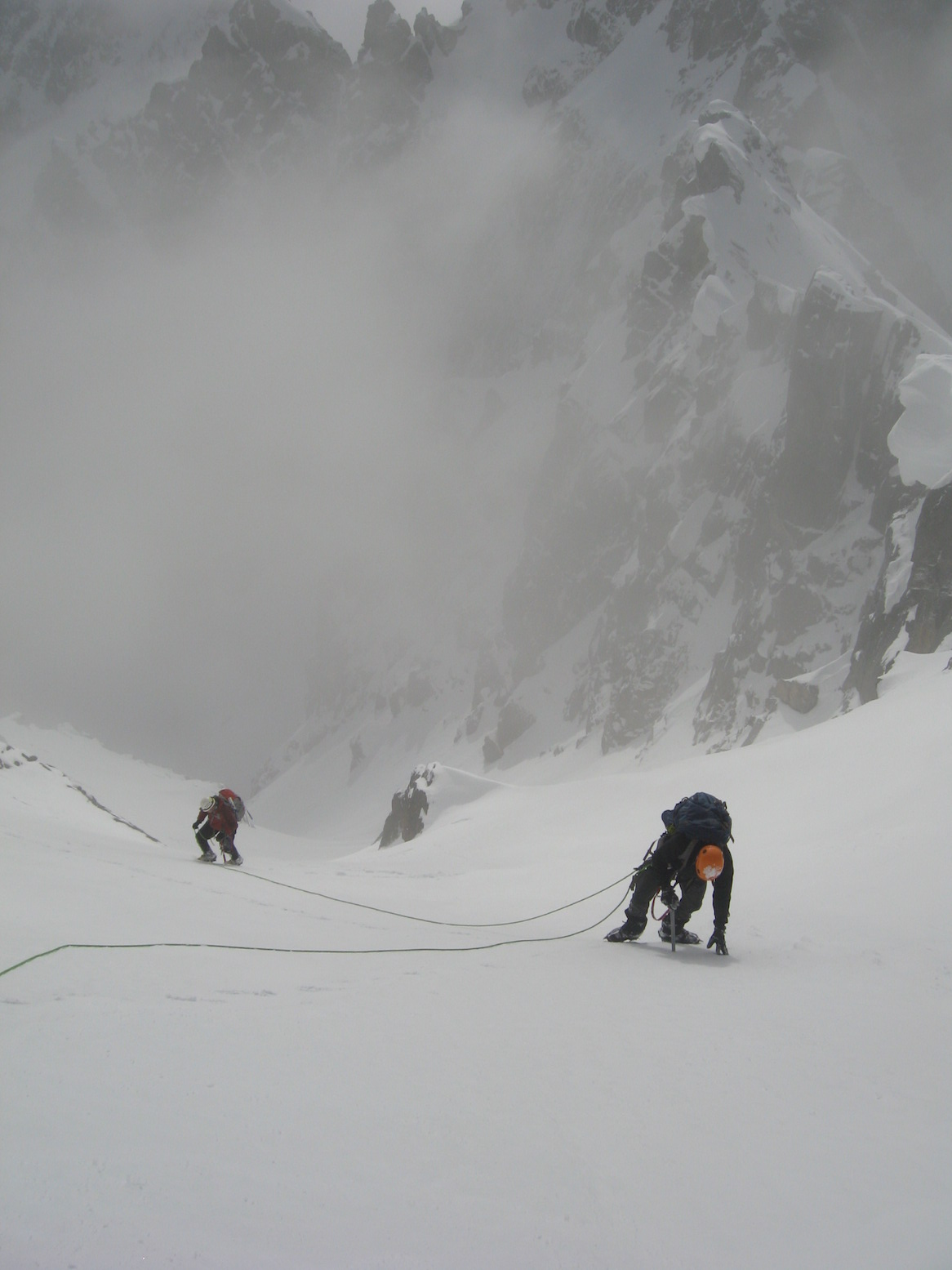
Climbing in the Pacific Northwest

He has climbed the Seven Summits by climbing the highest peaks of all seven continents.

Dickinson spent six years in the United States Navy as a Special Operations Aviation Rescue Swimmer (AIRR). Navy AIRRs are members of the Naval Special Operations (NSO) community, consisting of personnel who take on the most difficult missions and the most elusive objectives, dedicated to being the top emergency response unit in the world. He did two tours in the Persian Gulf as a part of Operation Southern Watch with HS-2 on the USS Constellation (CV-64). His military duties were Combat Search and Rescue, Anti-Submarine Warfare Operator, Crew Chief, Aerial Gunner, Search and Surveillance, Vertical Replenishment and Special Warfare support.

Brian hosts the Calm in the Chaos Podcast, delivering raw, untold rescue experiences from the U.S. Navy's elite, unsung heroes. Each episode dives deep into the mindset of the individuals selflessly heading into the chaos to save the lives of others.

Brian's Blind Descent experience has been reenacted in television segments including the Christian Broadcast Network's 700 Club, the Weather Channel's Freaks of Nature, KING-TV and Brian was featured on CNN's Anderson Cooper, ABC's Good Morning America, CNN's New Day with Chris Cuomo, Huffington Post, Fox Business Varney & Co., Success Magazine, Redemption Movie Series, Weather Channel, American Survival Guide Magazine, Simple Grace Magazine,Charisma Magazine, and Guideposts

== Bibliography ==
Dickinson, Brian, Blind Descent, Tyndale House Publisher, 2014, ISBN 978-1-4143-9170-0

Dickinson, Brian, Calm in the Chaos, Lyons Press, 2024, ISBN 978-1493078530

Dickinson, Brian, Bloodline of Redemption, Focused Ascent, LLC., 2025 ISBN 979-8999718402
