= Edith Dickenson =

English-born Australian journalist

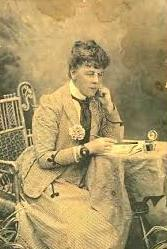
- Born: 1851
- Died: 1903 (aged 51–52); Cape Town, South Africa
- Occupation: Journalist
- Known for: Boer War coverage
- Spouse(s): William Belcher, Augustus Maximillian Dickenson

Edith Charlotte Musgrave Dickenson (1851–1903) was an English-born Australian journalist and a war correspondent during the Boer War in South Africa.

== Life ==
Dickenson was born on 30 May 1851, the only daughter of Augusta Sophia Musgrave and Lieutenant-Colonel Henry Frederick Bonham. She was raised in Suffolk, England. She married the Reverend William W. Belcher in 1870, and had five children with him, although one died young. In 1886, Dickenson left her husband, and England, and travelled to Australia (she arrived in arrived in Melbourne in February that year), to follow her lover, Augustus Maximillian Dickenson, a medical doctor based in Deloraine, Tasmania, whom she married. In 1888, the couple had a daughter, Augusta Edith Dickenson, known as Austral.

In the 1890s, Dickenson travelled through Australia, India and South Africa; she wrote articles and took photographs for The Adelaide Advertiser newspaper. She published a 40-page volume of her newspaper columns, entitled "What I Saw In India and the East" in 1900.

In 1899, The Adelaide Advertiser and The Adelaide Chronicle supported Dickenson to travel to South Africa, where the Boer War had broken out, and write articles about the war. She met and interviewed Australian nurses, and described conditions in refugee camps, orphanages, hospitals and prisoner of war camps. She was frequently critical of the conditions people and children were kept in. Emily Hobhouse, a British welfare campaigner, drew on Dickenson's writings as evidence for her work to improve conditions in South Africa.

Dickenson died at the age of 52, on 17 February 1903, in Cape Town, South Africa.
