= Joseph H. Dickinson =

American politician

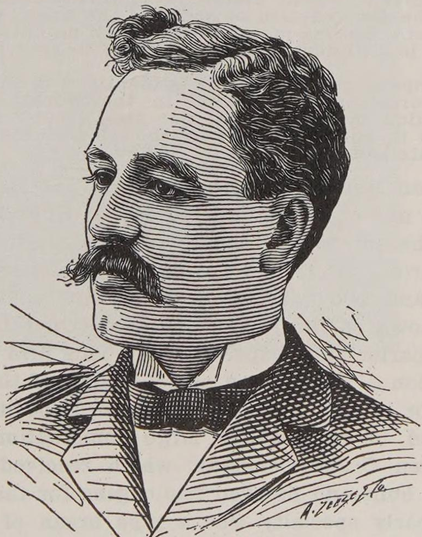

Member of the Michigan House of Representatives from the Wayne County 1st district
- In office 1897–1900

Personal details
- Born: June 22, 1855 Chatham, Ontario, Canada
- Died: June 3, 1936 Larchmont, New York, U.S.
- Party: Republican
- Spouse: Eva Gould (m. 1880)

Joseph Hunter Dickinson (June 22, 1855 – June 3, 1936) was an American organ maker and politician in Michigan.

Dickinson was born on June 22, 1855 in Chatham, Ontario in Canada. He moved to Michigan in the early 1880s.

He served two terms in the Michigan House of Representatives representing Wayne County, Michigan's 1st district as a Republican from 1897 to 1900. Dickinson was the second African-American to serve in the Michigan Legislature after William Webb Ferguson, who began his first term in 1893. He was born in Canada and moved with his family to Detroit. He married Eva Gould in 1880.
