= Arthur Dickinson (footballer) =

English footballer

Personal information
- Full name: Arthur William Dickinson
- Date of birth: 7 October 1907
- Place of birth: Darlington, England
- Date of death: 1976 (aged 68–69)
- Height: 5 ft 11 in (1.80 m)
- Position: Right back

Senior career*
Years	Team	Apps	(Gls)
19??–1930	Ferryhill Athletic		
1930–1931	Brighton & Hove Albion	0	(0)
1931–1932	Folkestone		
1932–193?	Darlington	3	(0)
- * Club domestic league appearances and goals

Arthur William Dickinson (7 October 1907 – 1976) was an English footballer who played as a right back in the Football League for Darlington. He was on the books of Brighton & Hove Albion without representing them in the league, and played non-league football for Ferryhill Athletic and Folkestone.

== Life and career ==
Arthur William Dickinson was born on 7 October 1907 in Darlington, County Durham. He played football for Northern League club Ferryhill Athletic, where his performances were reported to have attracted interest from clubs including Aston Villa and Grimsby Town of the Football League First Division. In November 1930, when he signed for Third Division South club Brighton & Hove Albion, the Athletic News described him as "a fearless player sound in tackling and quick at recovering".

Dickinson played regularly for Brighton's reserve team in the London Combination, but never appeared for the first team, and moved back into non-league football with Folkestone of the Southern League at the end of the season. Although he helped the team finish second in the Southern League Eastern Section, and the Daily Express reported that he "stood out in the Folkestone defence for fearless work" in the FA Cup defeat to his former club, Brighton & Hove Albion, he was unable to establish himself as a first-team regular and was released.

He returned to the north-east of England and signed for Darlington of the Third Division North. He made his debut in the Football League on 3 December 1932, standing in for regular right back Hughie Dow for the visit to Chester that Darlington lost 5–2. He played twice more in the last two weeks of the 1932–33 season as Darlington finished bottom of the division, but those were his only first-team appearances.

Dickinson died in 1976.

== Sources ==
- Joyce, Michael (2004). Football League Players' Records 1888 to 1939. Nottingham: SoccerData. ISBN 978-1-899468-67-6.
- Tweddle, Frank (2000). The Definitive Darlington F.C. Nottingham: SoccerData. ISBN 978-1-899468-15-7.
