= Margaret Dickenson =

Canadian cookbook author

Margaret H. Dickenson is a Canadian cookbook author, columnist and television host. Dickenson earned a degree in foods and nutrition from the University of Guelph, and has traveled around the world with her husband, a member of Canada's diplomatic corps.

Her first cookbook, From the Ambassador's Table, has received several international awards. Her second book, Margaret's Table - Easy Cooking & Inspiring Entertaining, has been recognized as the "Best Cookbook in the World on Entertaining (2006)" by the Gourmand World Cookbook Awards.

For five years she hosted a cooking and entertaining show on Rogers Television called Margaret's Sense of Occasion.

In 2003 she was one of 76 recipients of a Macdonald Institute's Centennial Award. In 2005, she won two first prizes and one second prize in The Birkett Mills' International Culinary Professionals buckwheat recipe competition (winning one prize in each of the three categories).

== Bibliography ==
- From the Ambassador's Table, 1996, ISBN 981-204-686-0
- Margaret's Table, 2006, ISBN 0-9739874-0-5
