= Hughie Dow =

English footballer (1906–1987)

Personal information
- Full name: Hugh Connor Dow
- Date of birth: 4 April 1906
- Place of birth: Herrington, England
- Date of death: 1987 (aged 81)
- Place of death: Sunderland, England
- Height: 5 ft 10 in (1.78 m)
- Position: Full back

Senior career*
Years	Team	Apps	(Gls)
1925–1930	Sunderland	0	(0)
1930–1932	Grimsby Town	2	(0)
1932–1934	Darlington	40	(1)
1934–1936	Shotton C.W.		
1936–1937	Easington C.W.		
1937–19??	Shotton C.W.		
- * Club domestic league appearances and goals

Hugh Connor Dow (4 April 1906 – 1987) was an English footballer who made 42 appearances in the Football League in the 1930s playing as a full back for Grimsby Town and Darlington. He was on the books of Sunderland without playing for them in the League, and played non-league football in the north-east of England.

== Life and career ==
Dow was born in Herrington, County Durham, the eldest child of John Dow, a riveter in a shipyard, and his wife Mary Ann. At the time of the 1911 Census, the family was living in the Monkwearmouth area of Sunderland. Described as a "sturdily built defender", he began his senior football career with Sunderland, but never made a first-team appearance in several seasons with the club. In 1930, he was initially placed on the transfer list, but on appeal to the Football League was allowed a free transfer. He then signed for Grimsby Town of the First Division. He spent most of his Grimsby career playing for their reserves in the Midland League, at right half as well as his more normal right-back position, and appeared only twice for Grimsby's first team. At the end of his second season, he was listed as one of several "others who may be released", and in September 1932, he signed for Darlington.

He began his Darlington career in the reserves, but soon established himself as first choice at right back. In January 1933, they were a goal down to Stockport County and "ten seconds from the finish [when] with a splendid effort, Dow, the right back, ran the ball half the length of the field and put over a quick centre from the corner flag. Hurst headed the ball into the net and the referee blew the final whistle." A first-team regular for the rest of the 1932–33 season, Dow was one of just five players on Darlington's retained list for the following campaign. He appeared less frequently during 1933–34 after the arrival of Irish full-back Bill Scott in mid-September. He lost his place to Scott after an unexpectedly heavy defeat at home to Mansfield Town, and appeared only infrequently thereafter, sometimes replacing Bill Allison at left back. Dow, like all but two of Darlington's reserve players, was given a free transfer at the end of the season.

Dow then moved into non-league football with Wearside League club Shotton Colliery Welfare. According to the Sunderland Echo's correspondent, he "rendered the club excellent service" over his first season, After his second, he chose not to re-sign, instead joining fellow Wearside League team Easington Colliery Welfare, but after only a few months he returned to Shotton.

Dow's death at the age of 81 was registered in the third quarter of 1987 in the Sunderland district.
