= Dickenson Hill Road =

Street in Singapore

Coordinates: 1°16′50.4″N 103°50′36.4″E

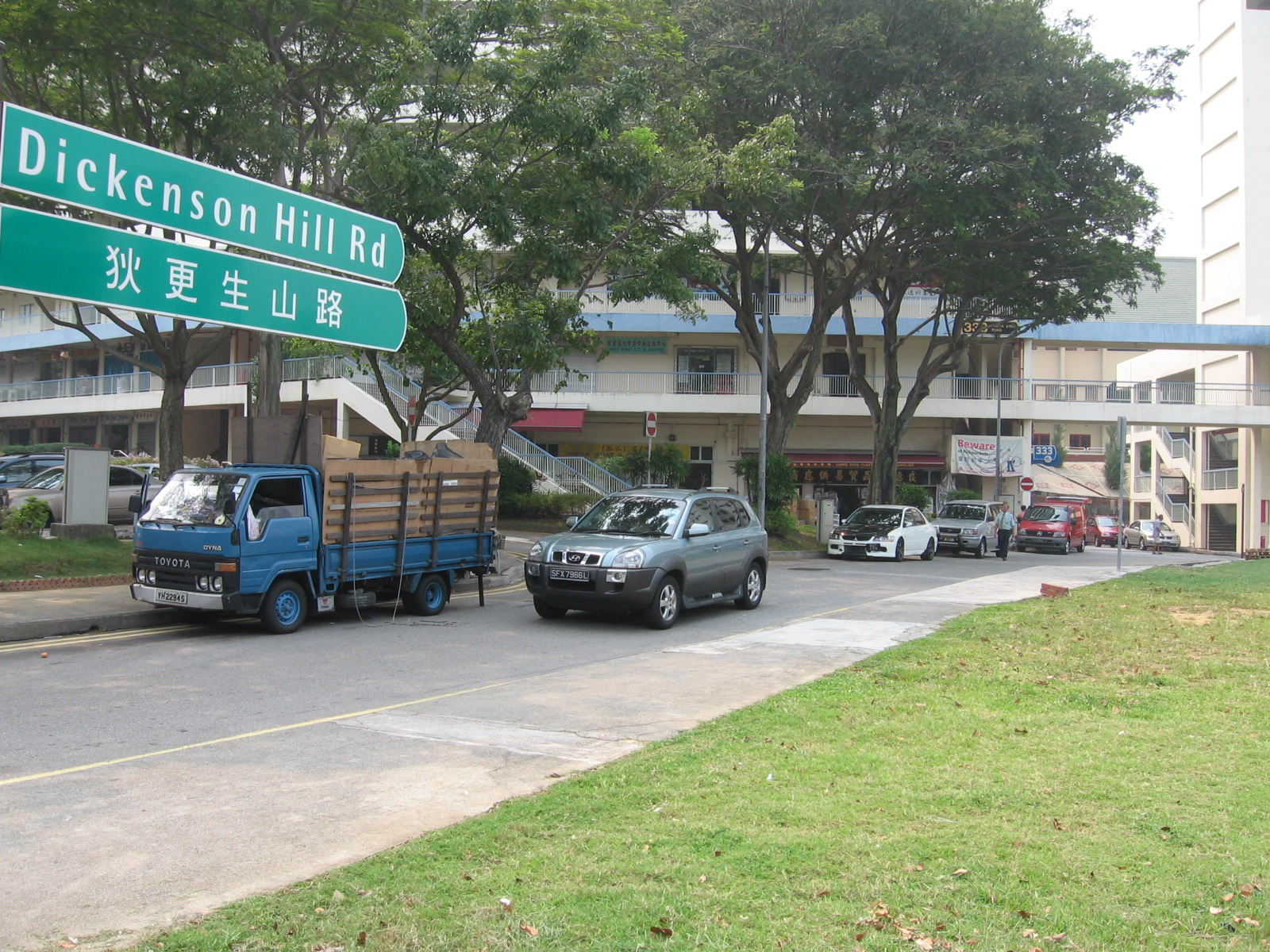
Dickenson Hill Road, Chinatown, Singapore.

Dickenson Hill Road (Chinese: 狄更生山路) is a one-way road located in Chinatown within the Outram Planning Area in Singapore. The road links Banda Street to Neil Road and ran next to Jinricksha Station.

== Etymology and history ==
Dickenson Hill was named after Reverend J.T. Dickenson who ran a missionary school in the area and Dickenson Hill Road was named after it. The area was eventually renamed as Bukit Pasoh but it retained its name.
