= Martin Dickinson =

English footballer

Personal information
- Full name: Martin John Dickinson
- Date of birth: 14 March 1963 (age 63)
- Place of birth: Leeds, England
- Position: Centre-back

Youth career
- –1980: Leeds United

Senior career*
Years	Team	Apps	(Gls)
1980–1986	Leeds United	103	(2)
1986–1988	West Bromwich Albion	50	(2)
1988–1989	Sheffield United	1	(0)
Total		154	(4)
- * Club domestic league appearances and goals

Martin John Dickinson (born 14 March 1963) is an English former footballer who played as a centre-back. He played in the Football League with Leeds United, West Bromwich Albion and Sheffield United. He retired in 1989 as a result of whiplash.

Martin now applies his trade as a window cleaner, owning his own window cleaning empire.
