= Harold Dickinson =

Welsh cricketer

Personal information
- Full name: Harold John Dickinson
- Born: 26 November 1911; Barry, Glamorgan, Wales
- Died: 2 June 1997 (aged 85); Hammersmith, London, England
- Batting: Right-handed
- Bowling: Right-arm fast-medium

Domestic team information
- Years: Team
- 1934–1935: Glamorgan

Career statistics
Competition	FC
Matches	7
Runs scored	37
Batting average	5.28
100s/50s	–/–
Top score	14*
Balls bowled	612
Wickets	6
Bowling average	55.83
5 wickets in innings	–
10 wickets in match	–
Best bowling	3/91
Catches/stumpings	3/–
- Source: Cricinfo, 3 July 2010

Harold John Dickinson (26 November 1911 – 2 June 1997) was a Welsh cricketer. Dickinson was a right-handed batsman who bowled right-arm fast-medium. He was born at Barry, Glamorgan. He was educated in his early years at Barry County Boys School.

Dickinson made his first-class debut for Glamorgan in 1934 against Cambridge University. From 1934 to 1935, he made 7 first-class appearances, with his final first-class appearance for the county coming against Warwickshire in the 1935 County Championship. In his 7 first-class matches, he scored 37 runs at a batting average of 5.28, with a high score of 14*. In the field he also took 3 catches With the ball he took 6 wickets at a bowling average of 55.83, with best figures of 3/91.

In the 1935 season, he was offered terms by Glamorgan, but due to the club's modest finances, he instead opted to join the Great Western Railway as a draughtsman. Dickinson died at Hammersmith, London on 2 June 1997.
