= Ted Dickinson =

English cricketer

Personal information
- Full name: John Edward Dickinson
- Born: 20 May 1914; Ashby-de-la-Zouch, Leicestershire, England
- Died: 24 March 2003 (aged 88); Torquay, Devon, England
- Batting: Left-handed
- Bowling: Slow left-arm orthodox

Domestic team information
- Years: Team
- 1947–1953: Devon
- 1933–1935: Leicestershire

Career statistics
Competition	First-class
Matches	2
Runs scored	27
Batting average	6.75
100s/50s	–/–
Top score	16
Balls bowled	102
Wickets	–
Bowling average	–
5 wickets in innings	–
10 wickets in match	–
Best bowling	–
Catches/stumpings	1/–
- Source: Cricinfo, 13 April 2011

John Edward Dickinson (20 May 1914 – 24 March 2003) was an English cricketer. Dickinson was a left-handed batsman who bowled slow left-arm orthodox. He was born in Ashby-de-la-Zouch, Leicestershire.

Dickinson made his first-class debut for Leicestershire against Lancashire in the 1933 County Championship. He played a further first-class match for Leicestershire against Warwickshire in the 1935 County Championship. In his two first-class matches, he scored 27 runs at a batting average of 6.75, with a high score of 16. With the ball he bowled 17 wicket-less overs. Following the war he joined Devon where he represented the county infrequently in the Minor Counties Championship from 1947 to 1953.

Dickinson had played football, but his career in this sport was ended by a broken leg. Following his move to Devon, he became a driving force behind the Torquay Festival, which had in the 1950s rivalled the Scarborough Festival and the Hastings Festival. He died in Torquay, Devon on 24 March 2003.
