= Mae Dickinson =

Indiana state legislator (1933–2017)

Gurtha Mae Dickinson (February 8, 1933 – January 17, 2017) was a welder and state legislator in Indiana.

== Early life ==
She was born in Mound City, Illinois. She married Valjean Leon Dickinson (died 1990) who was a born in South Bend and became community leader. They moved in Indianapolis in 1967 when he became assistant commissioner in the Indiana Department of Correction. He served in the Indiana House of Representatives in 1965 and her father-in-law Jesse Dickinson served multiple terms in the Indiana House of Representatives and Indiana Senate.

== Career ==
She was active in the United Auto Workers. She successfully sponsored bills to require background checks for school workers, increased penalties for convicted batterers, and added protections for people testifying in criminal trials.

As a Democrat, she represented northeast Indianapolis. She served on the Governor's Commission on Abused and Neglected Children. She represented Indiana's 95th House District from 1992 to 2007.

She sued the state alleging its district apportionment discriminated against the predominantly African American section.
