= Maggie Dickinson =

Australian ballet dancer

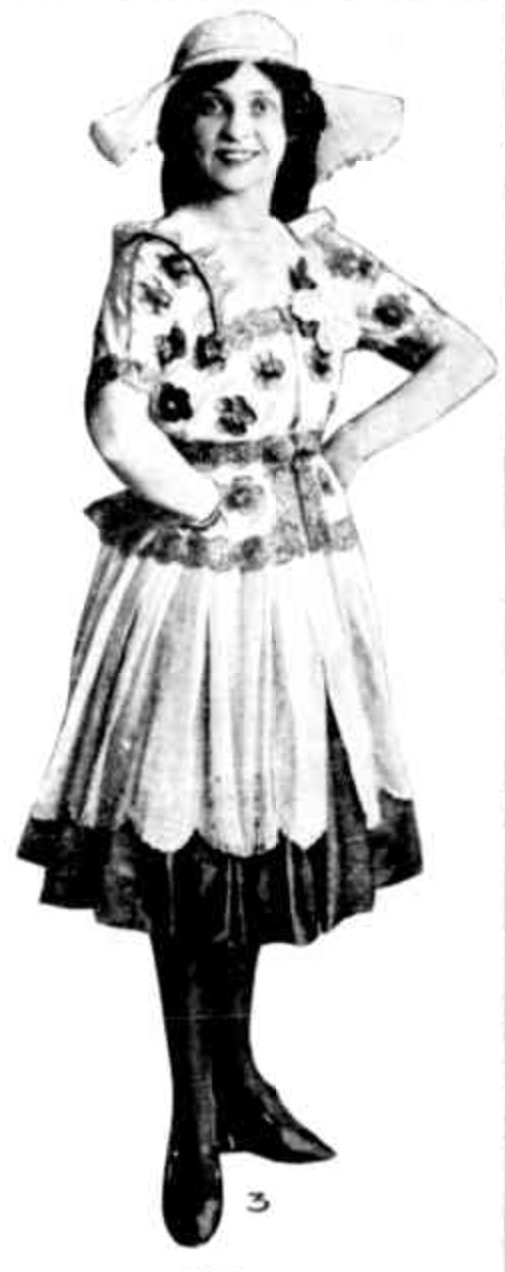
Dickinson, as Gretchen in Mother Goose, 1915

Margaret Esme Dickinson (1894 – 16 June 1949) was an Australian ballet dancer, a popular performer in J. C. Williamson's pantomimes. She married a dancing partner, who was already engaged to his previous dancing partner, creating a scandal.

== History ==
Dickinson was born in Flemington, Victoria to Fenton Kerr Dickinson and Ida Elizabeth Dickinson, (née Fagbery, died 1933) and began her stage career at an early age.

In 1910 she was a member of the New English Comic Opera Company, performing The Arcadians at the Theatre Royal, Melbourne By 1912 she had joined J. C. Williamson, playing in the Christmas pantomime Puss in Boots, which moved to Sydney and played country New South Wales and Victoria. In 1913 as a member of the troupe supporting Adeline Genée's tour, she received favorable notices, and became a leading member of JCW's ballerinas, notably in pantomime. Her next major production was The Forty Thieves, when she played the "Spirit of Mischief", critics noting her debt to Genée. She played in the December 1914 pantomime Cinderella, starring in the Wildflowers ballet, choreographed by Minnie Everett. The pantomime toured to New Zealand, where it was a "hit". Mother Goose came next, in 1915 and in 1916 The House that Jack Built, which also travelled to New Zealand. Dick Wittington played in 1917, again choreographed by Everett. It included a ballet entitled War, in which Dickinson played "Peace" to Ruby Grainger's "War" and Sydney Yates' "Civilisation".

Goody Two Shoes was the Christmas pantomime in 1918, which included a "Toy" ballet, again partnered by Yates, whose real surname was Culverhouse. They fell in love, which was awkward for Yates, as he was engaged to his previous dancing partner, Ellen Maingay Daniels, whose stage name was Daisy Yates. Daniels sued Culverhouse for £2000 for breach of promise, and was awarded £500. The 1920 pantomime was The Sleeping Beauty, which included a "Fox and Pheasant" dance with Yates; again successful in New Zealand. She danced before the Prince of Wales at a gala performance.

In February 1921 Dickinson appeared in the pantomime Humpty Dumpty. At the conclusion of that season she announced she was off to London, however on 14 March 1921, at Christ Church, St Kilda, she married Sydney Charles Culverhouse. The couple then left for London and Europe.

In January 1932 she returned to Melbourne, working as ballet mistress for Williamson's. She choreographed the ballet for its production of Noël Coward's Bitter Sweet.

She died in Elwood, Victoria in 1949, aged 54.

The actress Ida Florence "Flossie" Dickinson (died 21 November 1953), who married JCW associate Charles A. Wenman (died October 1954) in January 1914, was a sister.
