= Francis Dickinson (1632–1704) =

English soldier

Captain Francis Dickinson (1632–1704) was a soldier who participated in the English invasion of Jamaica in 1655.

Francis was born in Appleton, in Berkshire (now Oxfordshire). He was the son of Rev. William Dickinson, Rector of St Lawrence's Church there, and younger brother of Edmund Dickinson (1624–1707), the physician and alchemist. Family tradition maintains that Dickinson received 6,000 acres of land in Jamaica as reward for his part in seizing the island for the English.
