= Valjean Dickinson =

American politician (1929–1990)

Valjean Leon Dickinson (February 27, 1929 – July 13, 1990) was a politician in Indiana. He served as president of the local NAACP branch and represented St. Joseph County, Indiana in the Indiana House of Representatives between 1965 and 1966. He was a Democrat.

From 1969 to 1970, Dickinson served as deputy director of Community Action Against Poverty. From 1970 to 1975, he was associate director of the Indianapolis Community Service Council. He was an assistant professor at Indiana University where he taught social work. He founded the Black Family and Urban Institute.

He was the son of Jesse Dickinson, a six term member of the Indiana House of Representatives and one term Illinois Senate member during the 1940s and 1950s. Valjean Dickinson's wife Mae Dickinson also served in the state legislature.
