= Frederick Dickinson =

American historian

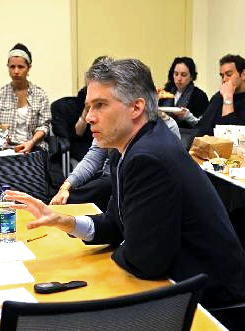
- Dickinson in March 2011
- Born: Tokyo, Japan
- Education: Yale University (PhD); Yale University (M.A.); Kyoto University (M.A.); University of Notre Dame (B.A.)
- Scientific career
- Fields: History, Diplomatic history, History of Japan,
- Workplaces: University of Pennsylvania

Frederick R. Dickinson is a professor of Japanese history at the University of Pennsylvania.

== Career ==
Dickinson teaches courses in the University of Pennsylvania Department of History on modern Japan, East Asian diplomacy, as well as politics and nationalism in Asia. The Japanese Ministry of Education, the Fulbright Commission, and the Japan Foundation have conferred grants upon him, and he was a National Fellow at the Hoover Institution (Stanford University, 2000–2001) and visiting research scholar at the International Research Center for Japanese Studies (Kyoto, 2011–12).

== Publications ==
=== Books ===
- 2015 – World War I and the Triumph of a New Japan, 1919–1930. Cambridge University Press.
- 2009 - Taisho tenno. Minerva Press, Japan Kyoto.
- 2001 – War and National Reinvention: Japan in the Great War, 1914-1919 . Harvard University Asia Center.

== Personal ==
Dickinson was born in Tokyo, and raised in Kanazawa and Kyoto, all in Japan.
