= Justice Dickinson =

Justice Dickinson may refer to:

- Daniel A. Dickinson (1839–1902), associate justice of the Minnesota Supreme Court
- Jess H. Dickinson (born 1947), associate justice of the Mississippi Supreme Court
- Townsend Dickinson (1795–1851), associate justice of the Arkansas Supreme Court

== See also ==
- Edwin C. Dickenson (1880–1956), associate justice of the Connecticut Supreme Court
- Justice Dickerson (disambiguation)
