= Jacob Alan Dickinson =

American politician (1911–1971)

School Board President

Jacob Alan Dickinson (July 20, 1911 – June 1, 1971) was a Topeka, Kansas attorney and president of the Topeka Board of Education at the time of the Supreme Court desegregation decision in Brown v. Board of Education (May 17, 1954).

Dickinson was a key supporter of elementary school integration, which had begun locally before the Supreme Court decision. He welcomed the Court's action, which he believed to be "in the finest spirit of the law and true democracy."

His father, William B. Dickinson, Sr., was an attorney. In 1927 his mother, Alice Hillman Dickinson, was one of the first two women elected to a school board in the state of Missouri.

Dickinson was the senior partner in the Topeka law firm Dickinson, Crow & Skoog. He married Edith Senner in 1931 and had two children: architect and businessman Jacob Alan "Skip" Dickinson II and author Linda Spalding. One of his brothers was journalist and editor William Boyd Dickinson, Jr.
