= William Dickinson (Rastall) =

English topographer and legal writer (1756–1822)

William Dickinson (1756–1822) was an English topographer and legal writer.

== Biography ==
Born in 1756 and baptised William Dickinson Rastall, Dickinson was the only son of Dr. William Rastall, vicar-general of the church of Southwell. He became a fellow of Jesus College, Cambridge, where he graduated B.A. in 1777, M.A. in 1780.

On leaving the university he devoted himself to the study of the law. In 1795, at the request of Mrs. Henrietta Dickinson of Eastward Hoo, he assumed the name of Dickinson only. His residence was at Muskham Grange, near Newark, and he was a justice of the peace for the counties of Nottingham, Lincoln, Middlesex, Surrey, and Sussex. He died in Cumberland Place, New Road, London, on 9 October 1822.

== Family ==
He married Harriet, daughter of John Kenrick of Bletchingley, Surrey, they had a large family.

== Works ==
His works are:

1. History of the Antiquities of the Town and Church of Southwell, in the County of Nottingham, London, 1787, 4to; second edition, improved, 1801–1803, to which he added a supplement in 1819, and prefixed to which is his portrait, engraved by Holl, from a painting by Sherlock.
2. The History and Antiquities of the Town of Newark, in the County of Nottingham (the Sidnacester of the Romans), interpersed with Biographical Sketches, in two parts, Newark, 1806, 1819, 4to. These histories of Southwell and Newark form four parts of a work which he entitled: Antiquities, Historical, Architectural, Chorographical, and Itinerary, in Nottinghamshire and the adjacent Counties, 2 vols. Newark, 1801–19, 4to.
3. A Practical Guide to the Quarter and other Sessions of the Peace, London, 1815, 8vo; 6th edition, with great additions by Thomas Noon Talfourd and R. P. Tyrwhitt, London, 1845, 8vo.
4. The Justice Law of the last five years, from 1813 to 1817, London, 1818, 8vo.
5. A Practical Exposition of the Law relative to the Office and Duties of a Justice of the Peace, 2nd edition, 3 vols. London, 1822, 8vo.
