= Christine Arnothy =

French writer

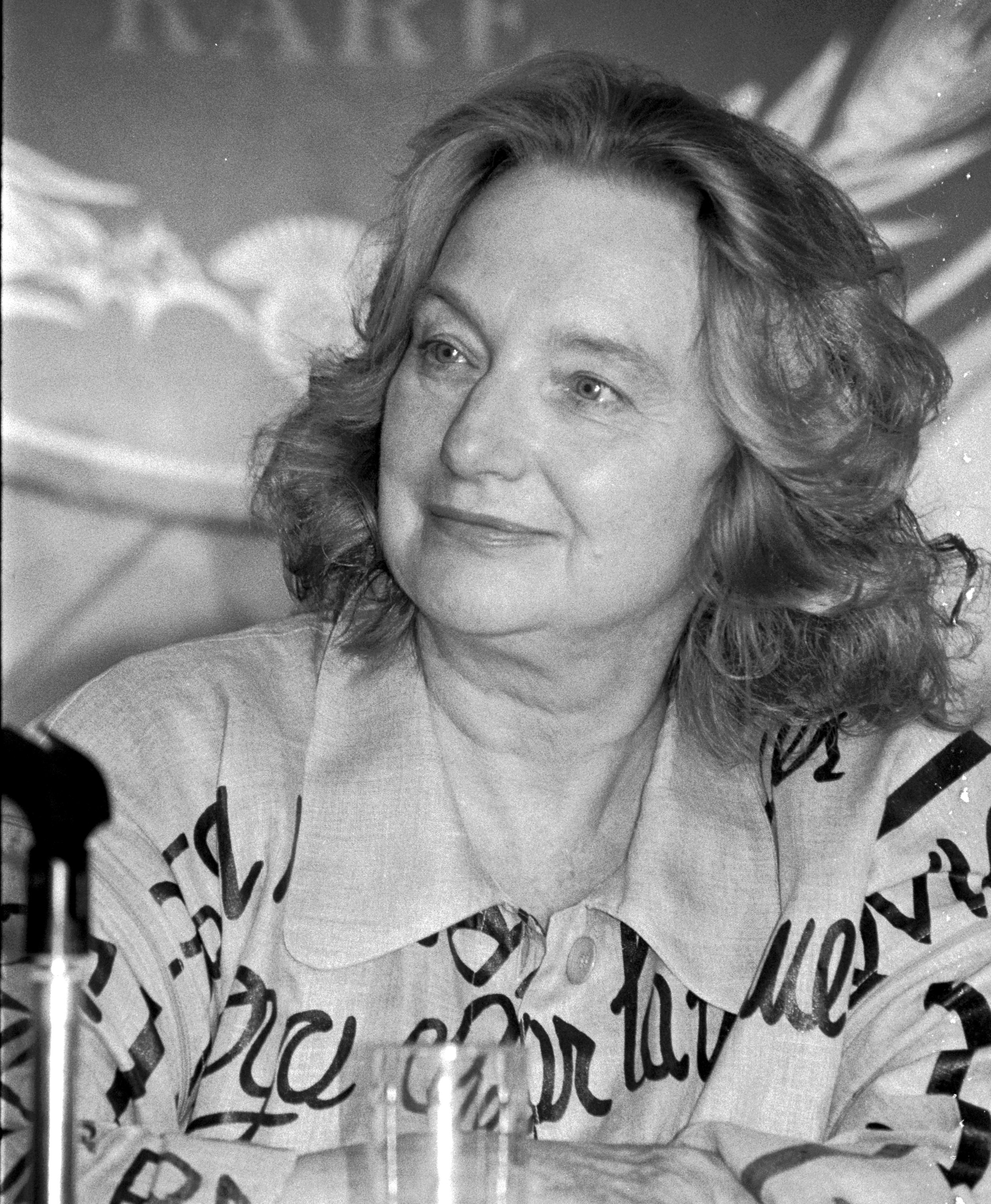
Christine Arnothy

Christine Arnothy (born Irène Kovach de Szendrö; 20 November 1930 – 6 October 2015) was a Hungarian-born French writer. She was born in Budapest. Her first book, J'ai quinze ans et je ne veux pas mourir (I Am Fifteen and I Do Not Want to Die) was submitted for a literary competition and won the Grand Prix Verité in 1954.

J'ai quinze ans et je ne veux pas mourir is based on her diary, which recorded her experiences as a teenager during the 1945 siege of Budapest. The book was reviewed in Harper's Magazine in 1956, The Daily Express, The New York Times,Herald Tribune, San Francisco Examiner, Chicago Sunday Tribune and The Times.

Her second novel "Dieu est en retard", Gallimard, 1955 ("God is Late") and her third book, "Il n'est pas si facile de vivre ", Fayard, 1957 ("It Is Not So Easy To Live"), describe the travels of a stateless young woman without a passport. Other novels include "Le Cardinal Prisonnier", Julliard, 1962 ("The Captive Cardinal"), "La Saison des Américains", Cercle du Nouveau Livre, 1964 ("The American Season") and Le Cavalier Mongol, Groupe Flammarion 1976, for which she received the price from the French Academy, Prix de la nouvelle de l'Académie Française.

== Personal life ==
Arnothy spent her childhood in Budapest. Her family fled the russian occupied city of Budapest and took refuge in Austria in 1948. During the occupation and until they fled to Austria, Arnothy wrote her experiences in her daily journal by candlelight, which was the basis of her first book J'ai quinze ans et je ne veux pas mourir. She studied at a French-speaking school in Austria and continued writing. She then moved to France where she continued her studies at the Sorbornne In Paris. It was in France where she published under her French Name, Christine Arnothy.

Arnothy married Claude Bellanger (1909–1978) a French newspaper publisher in 1964 with whom she had two sons, Pierre and Francois.

She also wrote several detective stories under the pseudonym William Dickinson, among other books.

== Sources ==
- Citatum
