= John Dickinson (physician) =

British physician and clinical researcher

Professor John Dickinson DM, FRCP, ARCO
- Born: 1 February 1927
- Died: 30 September 2015 (aged 88)
- Education: Oxford University; University College Hospital
- Occupations: Physician; Clinical researcher
- Employers: University College Hospital; St Bartholomew‘s Hospital Medical College

Professor Christopher John Dickinson DM, FRCP, ARCO (1927-2015), known as John, was a British physician and clinical researcher.

Dickinson was born on 1 February 1927. He underwent medical training at Oxford University and at University College Hospital, London. He worked at University College Hospital from 1964, and became Professor of Medicine (in 1974) and Chairman of the Department of Medicine at St Bartholomew's Hospital Medical College, retiring in 1982. He was subsequently Emeritus Visiting Professor at the Wolfson Institute of Preventive Medicine.

He was a member of the Medical Research Council and Chairman of the British Medical Research Society. He was also Secretary of the European Society for Clinical Investigation, an Honorary Fellow of Queen Mary University of London, a Fellow of the Royal College of Physicians (FRCP), and an Associate of the Royal College of Organists (ARCO).

He died on 30 September 2015.
