= Charles Dickinson (scientist) =

English landowner and magistrate (1755–1827)

Charles Dickinson FRS FSA (6 March 1755 – 5 February 1827) was an English gentleman, magistrate, amateur scientist, and literary dilettante.

== Life ==
On his election (27 November 1800) as a Fellow of the Royal Society, Charles Dickinson was described as a "gentleman well versed in various branches of natural science, and distinguished for his knowledge in polite literature." At age 20 he was admitted to Lincoln's Inn. In 1782 he made a Grand Tour including Italy, France and Germany. In 1790 he bought an estate at Farley Hill, Berkshire and resided there at the mansion known as Farley Hill Court. He was living in Soho Square in 1800 and had a house in Pimlico at the time of his death.

On 7 March 1799 at his residence at 32 Soho Square, Sir Joseph Banks chaired a meeting that formed the Royal Institution of Great Britain by resolution of the subscribers of 50 guineas each. As one of the subscribers, Charles Dickinson became part of the group of first Proprietors of the Royal Institution of Great Britain.

On 3 August 1807 Charles Dickinson married Catherine Allingham (who was then age 20). She became a close friend of the author Mary Russell Mitford. Charles Dickinson set up his own printing press and persuaded Mary Mitford to edit his translations of the work of Dante, Tasso, Ariosto, Petrarch, Ovid, and Virgil. According to Mary Mitford, Charles translated well and composed original poetry poorly but imagined his compositions good. Charles Dickinson belonged to several of the most distinguished literary clubs in London and for many years served as an active magistrate in Berkshire.

== Family history ==
Charles Dickinson's paternal grandfather Caleb Dickinson was a Quaker merchant in Bristol and owner of slaves, farms, sugar plantations and sugar refineries in Jamaica. Caleb's sons Ezekiel, Caleb II and Vickris inherited their father's property and also other interests from the Jamaican estates belonging to their uncle Jonathan Dickinson.

Vickris Dickinson's first wife Martha died on 18 October 1741. On 15 May 1746 Vickris married Elizabeth Marchant, daughter of a wealthy Quaker family in Bath. Two of the children of Vickris and Elizabeth Dickinson did not survive to adulthood. Their daughter Mary (c. 1747–1799), though born a Quaker, married in the Church of England, possibly influenced by growing abolitionist sentiment among Quakers.

In later life Vikris became an Anglican and Vikris's immediate descendants abandoned Quakerism in favour of Anglicanism. According to his will, Vickris owned slaves at the time of his death on 4 February 1797. Vickris Dickinson's will put his estates in England and Jamaica into a trust with the proceeds divided by one-half to his son Caleb Dickinson III (1740–1820), one-quarter to his son Charles Dickinson, one-six to his daughter Mary Dickinson Creswicke, and one-twelfth to Mary's children. As an unmarried man, Charles Dickinson seems to have fathered c. 1795 a daughter Elizabeth, who married the musician John Camidge in 1817.

When Charles Dickinson died in 1827 his brother Caleb Dickinson III and sister Mary Dickinson Creswicke were dead, so the eleven-twelfths share of the trust established by Vickris Dickinson devolved upon Frances Dickinson, the daughter born when Charles Dickinson was 65 years old. For his own property, Charles's will created a new trust with a life interest for his wife Catherine and then his estate going to Frances. Charles's will left an annuity to Elizabeth Camidge.

Frances Dickinson (1820–1898) married John Edward Geils, gave birth to four daughters, and then divorced, resuming the use of her maiden name. Her second husband was Gilbert Ellliot, Dean of Bristol. She was an author and journalist and became a friend of Wilkie Collins and Charles Dickens.
