= William Dickinson (architect) =

English architect (1670s–1724)

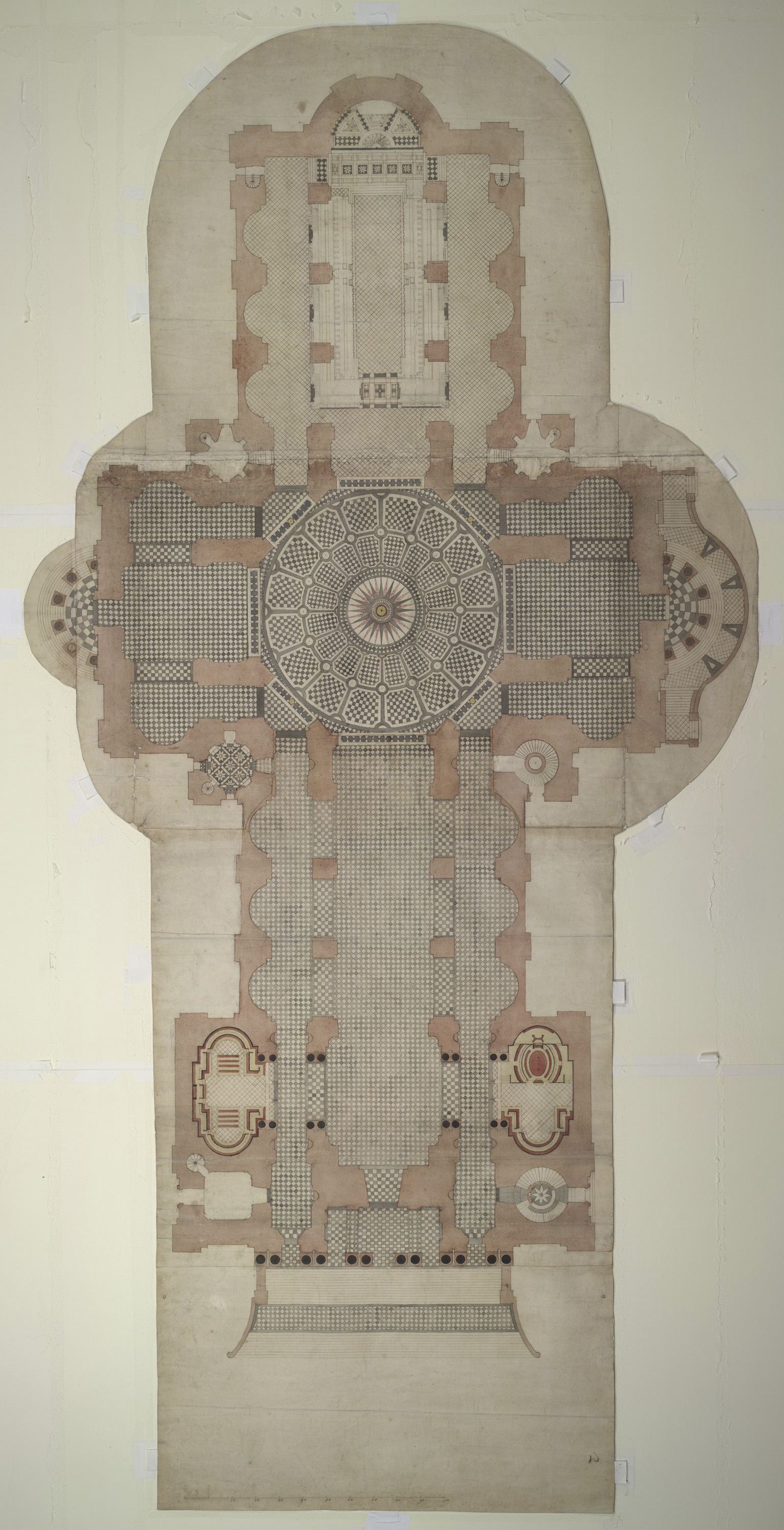
A colour-washed drawing by Dickinson of the church-floor paving at St Paul's Cathedral, London, c. 1709–10

William Dickinson (c.1670 − 24 January 1724) was an English architect.

== Life ==
Dickinson was the son of William Dickinson, Controller Clerk at Windsor Castle and chief clerk of the king's works. This elder Dickinson died in 1702 and according to Adrian Tinniswood his "sole contribution to architecture" was to be Chief Clerk of the Works.

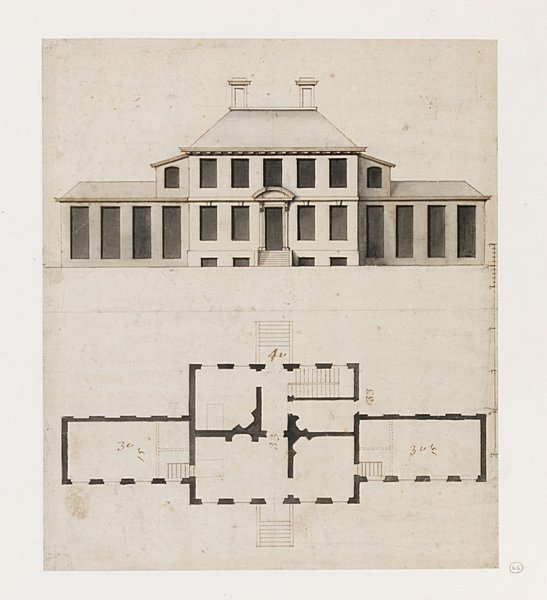
A drawing, probably by Dickinson, for an unidentified villa, c. 1710–24

Dickinson younger married Elizabeth, with whom he had a son, also called William.

He died in 1724 and was buried in Westminster Abbey. His gravestone in the north porch reads: "Here lies William Dickinson, architect. What sort of architect! Look upwards. Died 24 of January A.D. 1724 aged 54".

== Work ==
Dickinson, along with Nicholas Hawksmoor, Edward Woodroffe and John Oliver, worked under Sir Christopher Wren, the Chief Surveyor on the commission to rebuild London churches after the Great Fire of 1666.

In the 1680s Dickinson underwent training with Wren at the Office of Works. He was employed on many buildings, notably Westminster Abbey, where he worked for Wren as Deputy Surveyor. Together with Wren he was responsible for the restoration of the exterior of the abbey.

Other buildings he worked on include:

- St Paul's Cathedral (1696–1711) (as measuring clerk)
- Greenwich Hospital (as clerk of works)
- Windsor Castle (he succeeded his father's role as clerk of works)
- St James's Palace (as clerk of works)
- Pembroke House, Whitehall
- Hampton Court Palace

== Bibliography ==
- Tim Benton, The Architecture of William Dickinson Junior, University of London (Courtauld Institute of Art, 1969), 108pp.
