= Edmund Dickinson =

English physician, alchemist, and philosopher (1624–1707)

Edmund Dickinson or Dickenson (1624–1707) was an English royal physician and alchemist, author of a syncretic philosophical system.

== Life ==
He was son of the Rev. William Dickinson, rector of Appleton in Berkshire (now Oxfordshire), by his wife Mary, daughter of Edmund Colepepper, and was born on 26 September 1624. He received his primary education at Eton College, and in 1642 entered Merton College, Oxford, where he was admitted one of the Eton postmasters. He took the degree of B.A. 22 June 1647, and was elected probationer-fellow of his college, On 27 November 1649 he had the degree of M.A. conferred upon him. Applying himself to the study of medicine, he obtained the degree of M.D. on 3 July 1656.

About this time (Dickinson later claimed) he made the acquaintance of a certain Theodore Mundanus, an adept in alchemy about whom not much is otherwise known, who prompted him to devote his attention to chemistry. John Evelyn once went to see him and recorded the visit:

I went to see Dr. Dickinson the famous chemist. We had a long conversation about the philosopher's elixir, which he believed attainable and had seen projection himself by one who went under the name of Mundanus, who sometimes came among the adepts, but was unknown as to his country or abode; of this the doctor has written a treatise in Latin, full of very astonishing relations.

Evelyn also associated Dickinson with the Interregnum Oxford group of "virtuosi" that later contributed to the formation of the Royal Society.

On leaving college he began to practise as a physician in a house in High Street, Oxford, where he stayed for nearly two decades. The college made him superior reader of Linacre's lectures, in succession to Richard Lydall, a post which he held for some years.

He was elected honorary fellow of the College of Physicians in December 1664, but he was treated as somewhat suspect and was not admitted a fellow till 1677. In 1684 he came up to London and settled in St. Martin's Lane; he took over the house of Thomas Willis. Among his patients here was Henry Bennet, 1st Earl of Arlington, whom he cured of a hernia. By him the doctor was recommended to the king, Charles II, who appointed him one of his physicians in ordinary and physician to the household (1677). Charles took the doctor into special favour and had a laboratory built in Whitehall Palace. Here the king could retire with George Villiers, 2nd Duke of Buckingham and Dickinson, who exhibited chemical experiments. On the accession of James II (1685), Dickinson was confirmed in his office as king's physician, and held it until the abdication of James (1688).

Troubled with the stone, Dickinson retired from practice and spent the remaining nineteen years of his life in study and in the making of books. He died on 3 April 1707, aged 83, and was buried in the church of St. Martin-in-the-Fields, where a monument bearing a Latin inscription was erected to his memory.

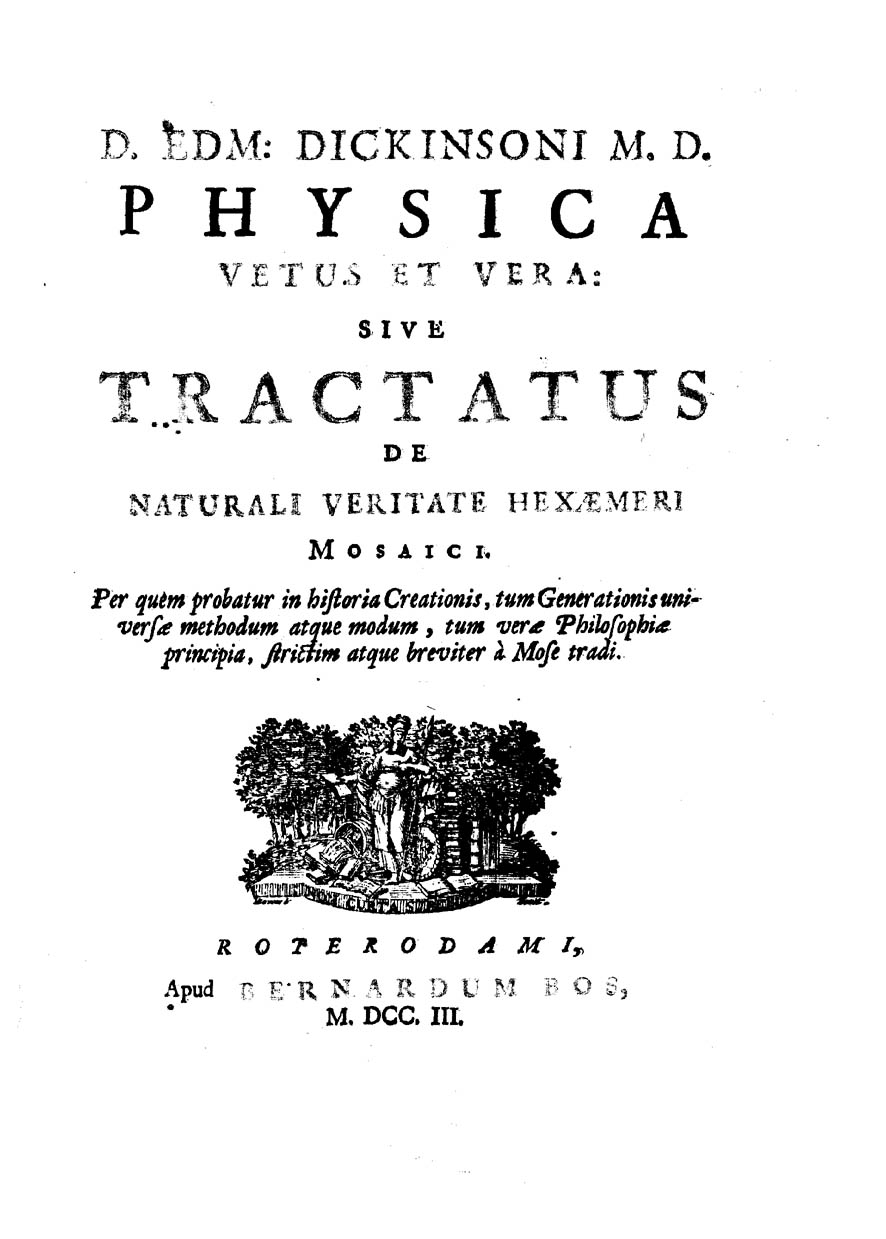
Physica vetus et vera, sive Tractatus de naturali veritate hexaemeri mosaici, 1703

== Works ==
While still a young man he published a book under the title of Delphi Phoenicizantes, Oxford, 1665, in which he attempted to prove that the Greeks borrowed the story of Pythian Apollo from the Hebrew scriptures. Anthony à Wood says that Henry Jacob the Younger, and not Dickinson, was the author of this book; it appeared with a contribution from Zachary Bogan. This was followed by Diatriba de Noae in Italiam Adventu, Oxford, 1655.

Later Dickinson published his notions of alchemy, in Epistola ad T. Mundanum de Quintessentia Philosophorum, Oxford. 1686. The major work on which he spent his latest years was a system of philosophy, set forth in Physica vetus et vera (1702). He established a philosophy founded on principles collected out of the Pentateuch, in which he mixed ideas on the atomic theory with passages from Greek and Latin writers as well as from the Bible. The book attracted attention, and was published in Rotterdam (1703), and in Leoburg (1705). Cotton Mather drew on Dickinson's thinking in his Biblia Americana.

Besides these he left behind him in manuscript a treatise in the Latin on the 'Grecian Games,' which William Nicholas Blomberg published in the second edition of his biography of Dickinson, his grandfather.

== Publications ==
- Physica vetus et vera, sive Tractatus de naturali veritate hexaemeri mosaici (in Latin). Rotterdam: Bernard Bosc. 1703.
