= William Dickinson (cricketer) =

Welsh cricketer and British Army officer (1889–1948)

Personal information
- Full name: William Vicris Digby Dickinson
- Born: 2 November 1889; Swansea, Glamorgan, Wales
- Died: 24 November 1948 (aged 59); Nairobi, Kenya Colony
- Batting: Right-handed
- Bowling: Left-arm fast-medium

Career statistics
Competition	First-class
Matches	14
Runs scored	614
Batting average	32.31
100s/50s	1/2
Top score	150
Balls bowled	2,652
Wickets	59
Bowling average	21.79
5 wickets in innings	5
10 wickets in match	1
Best bowling	7/111
Catches/stumpings	8/–
- Source: Cricinfo, 26 January 2019

William Vicris Digby Dickinson MC (2 November 1889 – 24 November 1948) was a Welsh first-class cricketer and British Army officer.

== Honours and awards ==
- 4 June 1917 - Captain William Vicris Digby Dickinson, South Wales Borderers was awarded the Military Cross for distinguished service in the field.
