= William Boyd Dickinson =

American journalist

- Born: May 8, 1908; Kansas City, Missouri, United States
- Died: September 12, 1978 (aged 70); Philadelphia, Pennsylvania
- Education: University of Kansas
- Occupation: Journalist
- Relatives: Father: William B. Dickinson, Sr.; Mother: Alice Hillman Dickinson
- Writing career
- Notable work: War correspondent for United Press International during World War II

William Boyd Dickinson Jr. (May 18, 1908 – September 12, 1978) was United States war correspondent for United Press International during World War II. He was born into a family with a tradition of writing and public service. His father, William B. Dickinson Sr. was an attorney and his mother, Alice Hillman Dickinson, in 1927 became one of the first two women elected to a school board in the state of Missouri. His uncle was the noted Pittsburgh physician and medical author Breese M. Dickinson and another uncle, Cedric Dickinson, was a Canadian journalist.

== Biography ==
Dickinson began his journalistic career as a reporter at The Kansas City Star after graduation from the University of Kansas in 1929. In 1930 he joined UPI in Kansas City. He was sent to London in 1940 to cover the Blitz and remained there as news editor until early 1944 when he was assigned to the Southwest Pacific. He reported from Australia, the Pacific Islands and Japan until 1946.

Dickinson was the first to report many wartime events and the only reporter to land on Leyte from the same landing barge as Gen. Douglas MacArthur. He flew with MacArthur from Okinawa to Tokyo to witness the surrender of Japan aboard the USS Missouri in 1945.

From 1949, he was successively news editor, managing editor and executive editor of the Philadelphia Bulletin until his retirement in 1973, by which time the newspaper had reached the then highest circulation in its history. Under his editorial management the newspaper won Pulitzer Prizes in 1964 and 1965. Dickinson was well known for his opposition to attempts by courts to limit reporting of pretrial news. In 1963 he risked a contempt sentence and jail for refusing to divulge a reporter's news sources.

In 1972 Dickinson was part of the first group of American editors to enter China since the Communist takeover in 1949, about which he wrote a book, "China Today". From 1975 to 1977 he served on the U.S. Privacy Protection Study Commission examining the threat to personal privacy from the increased use of computerized data processing.

In 1948 he married journalist and author Joan Younger. Dickinson had three brothers: attorney and school board president Jacob Alan Dickinson, attorney Martin Brownlow Dickinson and Army Lt. General Hillman Dickinson. His son is journalist and editor William B. Dickinson.

== Bibliography ==
- This is Philadelphia (1949)
- China Today (1972)
