= Anthony R. Dickinson =

British neuroscientist

Anthony R. Dickinson (born 1960) is a British academic, neuroscientist and a Scientific Advisor at the Beijing Genomics Institute. He specialises in brain development and incremental intelligence training.

== Life ==
After some years working as a prototype electronics engineer, Dickinson graduated from the University of Sussex with a degree in Neuroethology, and continued his studies to obtain a pre-clinical Diploma in Neuroscience and surgery from the Royal School of Veterinary Medicine, at the University of Edinburgh.

After some time spent working as research associate to Dr. Alan Dixson on marmoset reproductive sex behaviour in the labs of the British Medical Research Council (1989–90) and later in the field studies of Mandrill baboons in the jungles of Gabon, West Africa (WHO attache, 1990–91), Dickinson then returned to the University of Edinburgh, where he was invited to conduct a longitudinal study concerned with the characterisation of intelligent systems (both real and artificial), involving experimental cognition work with human children, birds, monkeys, robots and human adult clinical outpatients.

Later a Chartered Psychologist (British Psychological Society), Dickinson accepted the position of visiting research fellow to the Snyder Lab of the McDonnell Centre for Higher Brain Function at Washington University School of Medicine (1999–2005). His principal researches there included investigations with electrophysiological correlates of hand–eye co-ordination behaviour in the posterior parietal cortex regions of the brain. Other research under Dickinson's supervision has involved the study of a wide variety of naturalistic behaviours of exotic animal species, both in captivity (largely involving the extensive collection of the Royal Zoological Society of Scotland) and wild populations of various primate species in Kenya, Gabon, Bolivia and Costa Rica. Other of his supervised student projects have recruited both human and non-human primates, dolphins and other cetaceans, ungulates, birds and insects covering a broad range of comparative topics including sexual behaviour, social dynamics and organisation, feeding and communication.

== Memberships ==
Dickinson's professional memberships include the Society for Psychological Science and the American Association for the Advancement of Science. He is an associate fellow of the British Psychological Society, the Hong Kong Psychological Society, the British Brain Research Association, the International Brain Research Organisation, The International Primatological Society, The New York Academy of Sciences, the Primate Society of Great Britain, the Royal Zoological Society of Scotland, the Society for Neuroscience, the Scottish Primate Group, and the Vision Sciences Society.

== Works ==
- "A Comparative and Developmental Analysis of Serially Motivated Organization in Young Children and Cebus Apella". Abstracts of the Vth European Conference on Developmental Psychology. Seville, Spain. September 1992.
- "Self-Regulating Ordering Mechanisms in Cebus Apella and Children". A New Paradigm – Handbook and Abstracts of the XVth Congress of the International Primatological Society. Bali, Indonesia. August 1994. p. 422.
- Calton, J. L.; Dickinson, A. R.; Snyder, L. H. (2002). "Non-spatial, motor-specific activation in posterior parietal cortex". Nature Neuroscience. 5 (6): 580–588. doi:10.1038/nn0602-862. PMID 12021766. S2CID 1012174.
- "Non-spatial, motor-specific activation in posterior parietal cortex" (PDF). The Journal of Neuroscience: 10091–10099. 4 October 2006.
- Chang S.W.C., Dickinson A.R. and Snyder, L.H. (2007) Neurons in the Parietal Reach Region (PRR) are strongly associated with the contralateral arm. Gordon Research Conference (Lewiston, ME), 2007
- Chang S.W.C, Dickinson A.R., Snyder, L.H. (2008) Limb-specific representation for reaching in the posterior parietal cortex. J. Neurosci. 28: 6128-6140. https://www.ncbi.nlm.nih.gov/pubmed/18550755
- Dickinson, A. R. [“Distinguished contributing author”] (2010). In Tomei (Ed.) Lexicon of Online and Distance Learning. Rowman & Littlefield Education, Lanham, MD, USA.
- Dickinson, A. R., & Hui, D. (2010). Enhancing intelligence, English and Math competencies for the classroom via e@Leader integrated online edutainment gaming and assessment. Chapter 18, in D. Russell (Ed.), 2010, Cases on collaboration in virtual learning environments: Processes and interactions. Information Reference Source, Hershey Publishers, NY, USA.
- Chan, Y. Y., Hui, D., Dickinson, A. R., et al. (2010). Engineering Outreach to Science and Technology Gifted Students in Hong Kong. IEEE Transactions on Education 53 (1): 158-171
- Chang, Steve W, Calton, Jeffrey L., Lawrence, Bonnie M., Dickinson, Anthony R., & Snyder, Lawrence H. (2015). Region=Specific Summation Patterns Inform the Role of Cortical Areas in Selecting Motor Patterns. Cerebral Cortex. PrePub Access: doi: 10.1093/cercor/bhv047. 1-13.
- Dickinson, A. R. & Zheng, E (2013). Comparative Early Infant Milestone Development: Measuring Babies and Engaging Parents, East and West. International Journal of Education and Psychology in the Community. 3(2): 11-21.
- Dickinson, A. R. (2023). Baby Milestones of Development (0-12 Mths). Professional & Technical Books, [Hardcover, PBk & Kindle eBook versions], Amazon Inc, USA.
- Dickinson, A. R. (2023). Baby Milestones of Development (12-24 Mths). Professional & Technical Books, [Hardcover, PBk & Kindle eBook versions], Amazon Inc, USA.
- Dickinson, A. R. (2023). Baby Milestones of Development (24-36 Mths). Professional & Technical Books, [Hardcover, PBk & Kindle eBook versions], Amazon Inc, USA.
