= William Croft Dickinson =

British historian and author (1897–1963)

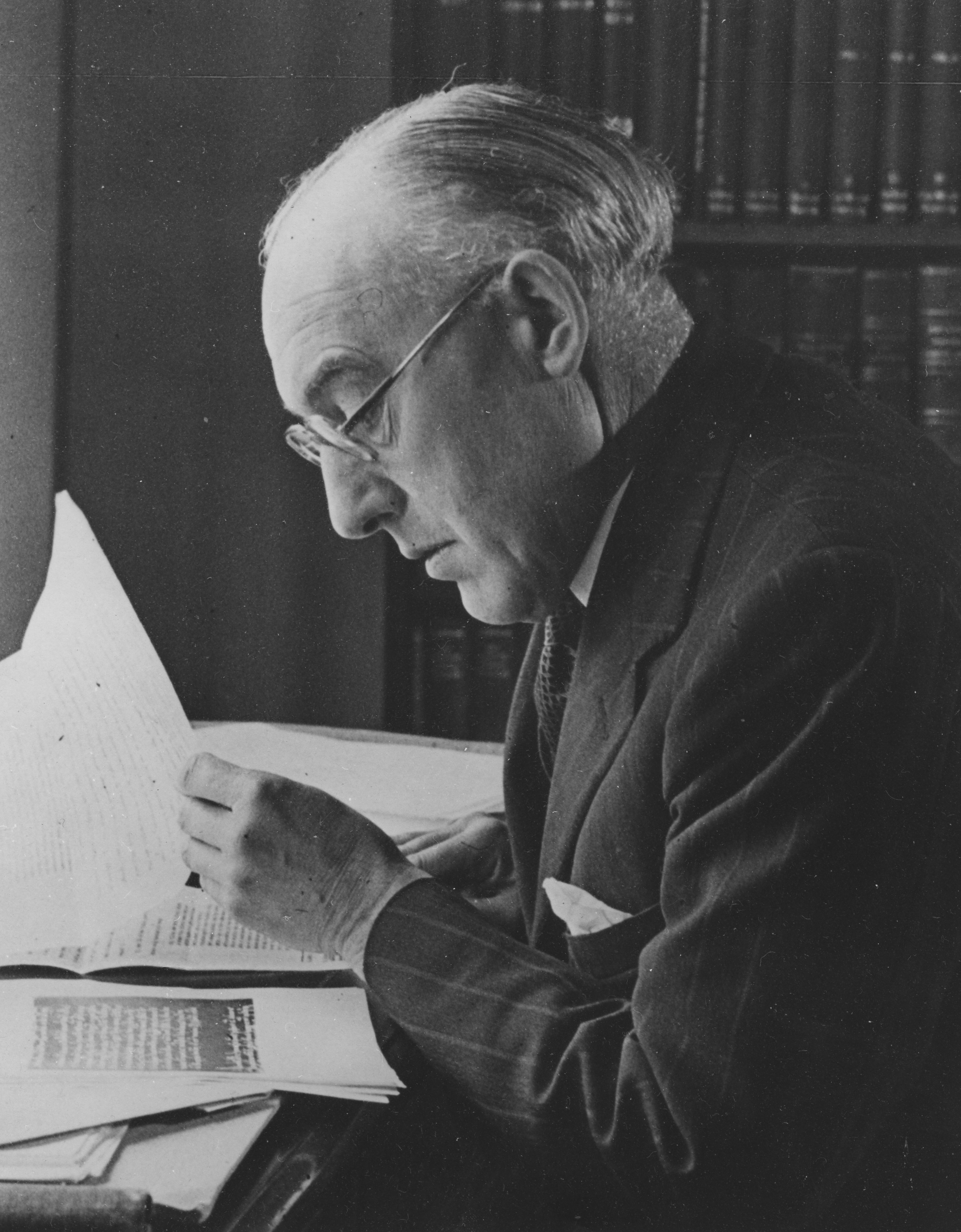
- Born: 28 August 1897
- Died: 22 May 1963 (aged 65)
- Occupations: historian, writer, librarian

William Croft Dickinson, CBE MC (28 August 1897 – 22 May 1963) was a leading expert in the history of early modern Scotland and a writer of both children's fiction and adult ghost stories.

Dickinson held the Chair of Sir William Fraser Professor of Scottish History and Palaeography at the University of Edinburgh from 1943 to 1963.

== Early life ==
Dickinson was born in Leicester. He was raised in Yorkshire and educated at Mill Hill School in London. He attended the University of St Andrews before in 1916 volunteering for the Black Watch. In Oct 1916 he was commissioned to the 45 Company Machine Gun Corps and awarded a Military Cross for 'conspicuous gallantry' in action near Ypres on 31 July 1917. He returned to St Andrews in 1919, graduating with a First Class Degree in History in 1921.

== Academic career ==
In the earlier years of his academic career Dickinson was influenced by his St Andrews's supervisor, J. D. Mackie. Dickinson's published scholarship focused on editing the court books of early modern sheriff courts (on which his PhD research was based).

In 1923, at the invitation of William Beveridge, Dickinson moved to the London School of Economics (LSE) to take up the post of assistant secretary. His career in university administration saw him appointed in 1933 to the position of joint - and then two years later sole - librarian of the British Library of Political and Economical Science at the LSE.

During the 1930s, Dickinson continued to publish on the records of Scotland and in 1943 he was appointed Sir William Fraser Professor of Scottish History and Palaeography at the University of Edinburgh, the oldest and most distinguished Scottish history professorship in the world. Dickinson - the first English-born occupant of the Chair - held the post longer than anyone before or since.

In this phase of his career, the focus of Dickinson's work shifted in the direction of the Scottish Reformation and general works for students, but he continued to pursue major editorial projects, including the writings of John Knox and the records of the medieval burgh of Aberdeen.

In addition to his personal scholarship, Dickinson was a long-standing member of the committee which oversaw the running of Edinburgh University Press and worked to build up and raise the profile of The Scottish Historical Review, widely regarded today as the world's leading periodical for current research on Scottish history. His successor in the Fraser Chair, Gordon Donaldson, considered Dickinson's efforts with the Scottish Historical Review, to be his most important contribution to Scottish history.

Dickinson was also a key member of the Scottish Records Advisory Council from 1944 onwards. The council has been hailed for its important role in helping to pave the way for the Public Registers and Records (Scotland) Act of 1948, which created an independent Scottish Records Office.

== Children's fiction and ghost stories ==
Alongside his academic writings, Dickinson was an accomplished author of children's fantasy stories as well as traditional ghost stories for readers of all ages, publishing a number of books during his time in the Fraser Chair.

In 2017, Dickinson's collection Dark Encounters: A Collection of Ghost Stories was republished by Birlinn Books.

== Honours ==
Dickinson was conferred with an honorary degree of Doctor of Letters by the University of St Andrews in 1952 and was made a Commander of the Order of the British Empire in the year that he died.

== Works ==
=== Monographs ===
- The Study of Scottish History (1945) (short paper)
- John Galt, "The Provost" and the Burgh (1954) (short paper)
- The Scottish Reformation and Its Influence upon Scottish Life and Character (1960) (short paper)
- Scotland from the Earliest Times to 1603 (1961; 2nd edn 1965; 3rd edn 1977)

=== Edited works ===
- The Sheriff Court Book of Fife: 1515-1522 (1928)
- The Court Book of the Barony of Carnwath, 1523-1542 (1937)
- John Knox's History of the Reformation in Scotland (1949)
- A Source Book of Scottish history (1952; 2nd edn 1958) (co-editor with G. Donaldson and I. A. Milne)
- Two Students at St. Andrews, 1711-1716 (1952) (short paper)
- Early Records of the Burgh of Aberdeen: 1317, 1398-1407 (1957)

=== Children's and general fiction ===
- Borrobil (1944)
- The Eildon Tree (1947)
- The Flag from the Isles (1951)
- The Sweet Singers, and Three Other Remarkable Occurrents (1953) (collection)
- Return at Dusk (1953)
- Can These Stones Speak (1953)
- The Eve of St. Botulph (1953)
- The Sweet Singers (1953)
- His Own Number (1963)
- The House of Balfother (1963)
- The Witch's Bone (1963)
- The Return of the Native (1963)
- Dark Encounters (1963) (collection)
- The Keepers of the Wall (1968)
