= Tony Dickinson =

British psychologist

Tony Dickinson FRS
- Born: Anthony Dickinson; 17 February 1944 (age 82)
- Education: University of Manchester
- Known for: Animal learning
- Scientific career
- Fields: Comparative psychology
- Workplaces: University of Sussex; University of Cambridge
- Website: Official website

Anthony J. Dickinson (born 17 February 1944) is a British psychologist, currently Emeritus Professor of Comparative Psychology in the Department of Psychology at the University of Cambridge. He is the author of the highly cited monograph Contemporary Animal Learning Theory and was elected a Fellow of the Royal Society in 2003 for "internationally recognised contributions to our understanding of learning, memory, motivation and planning".

== Academic career ==
Dickinson graduated in psychology from the University of Manchester in 1967 and earned a PhD at the University of Sussex in 1971, continuing his academic career there as a postdoctoral assistant to Nicholas Mackintosh. He moved to the Department of Experimental Psychology at Cambridge in 1977, where he lectured in associative learning. He became professor in 1999 and has been emeritus professor and a fellow of Hughes Hall since his retirement in 2011.

== Research ==
Dickinson's research focuses on learning, memory, motivation, and future planning in both humans and other animals, and has influenced "incentive" theories of motivation and addiction. His recent work includes theories of actions and habits, drug addiction, and hedonic pleasure. His most highly cited paper is a 1998 Nature collaboration with Cambridge colleague Nicky Clayton on episodic-like memory in scrub jays. Other notable collaborators include Trevor Robbins and Barry Everitt (on mechanisms of addiction), Bernard Balleine (on motivation and hedonic pleasure), John M. Pearce (with whom Dickinson worked on animal learning at both Sussex and Cambridge), and Wolfram Schultz (with whom Dickinson has worked on the neuronal mechanisms of rewards, punishments, and other stimuli).

== Honours and awards ==
In 2001, Dickinson was elected the Sir Frederic Bartlett lecturer by the Experimental Psychology Society, an annual award recognising "distinction in experimental psychology... over an extended period", and delivered the 28th Bartlett Memorial Lecture on "Causal Learning" at Cambridge in July 2000. He was elected a Fellow of the Royal Society in 2003.

== Selected publications ==
=== Books ===
- Dickinson, Anthony (1980). Contemporary Animal Learning Theory. Cambridge: Cambridge University Press. ISBN 9780521234696.

=== Articles ===
- Schultz W, Dickinson A (2000). "Neuronal coding of prediction errors". Annu Rev Neurosci. 23: 473–500. doi:10.1146/annurev.neuro.23.1.473. PMID 10845072.
- Waelti P, Dickinson A, Schultz W (2001). "Dopamine responses comply with basic assumptions of formal learning theory". Nature. 412 (6842): 43–8. doi:10.1038/35083500. PMID 11452299. Archived from the original on 19 January 2024.
- Everitt BJ, Dickinson A, Robbins TW (2001). "The neuropsychological basis of addictive behaviour". Brain Res Brain Res Rev. 36 (2–3): 129–38. doi:10.1016/s0165-0173(01)00088-1. PMID 11690609. Archived from the original on 27 March 2023.
- Clayton NS, Bussey TJ, Dickinson A (2003). "Can animals recall the past and plan for the future?". Nat Rev Neurosci. 4 (8): 685–91. doi:10.1038/nrn1180. PMID 12894243.
- de Wit S, Kosaki Y, Balleine BW, Dickinson A (2006). "Dorsomedial prefrontal cortex resolves response conflict in rats". J Neurosci. 26 (19): 5224–9. doi:10.1523/JNEUROSCI.5175-05.2006. PMC 6674252. PMID 16687514.
- Perez OD, Dickinson A (2020). "A theory of actions and habits: The interaction of rate correlation and contiguity systems in free-operant behavior". Psychol Rev. 127 (6): 945–971. doi:10.1037/rev0000201. PMID 32406713.
