= Anthony Dickenson =

British professor of neuropharmacology

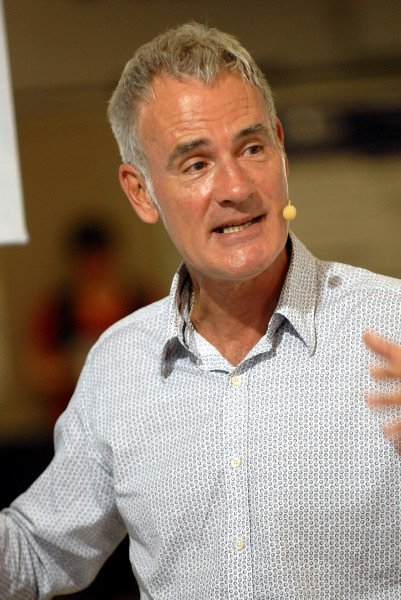
- Dickenson at IASP 2010
- Born: Anthony Henry Dickenson; England, United Kingdom
- Education: University of Reading
- Awards: FMedSci
- Scientific career
- Fields: Neuropharmacology
- Workplaces: University College London; National Institute for Medical Research
- Doctoral advisor: Jean-Marie Besson

Anthony Dickenson is a professor of neuropharmacology at University College, London.

== Career ==
Tony Dickenson was appointed to the Department of Pharmacology at University College in 1983. He conducted research into the mechanisms of pain and how pain can be controlled in both normal and patho-physiological conditions and how to translate basic science to the patient.

Dickenson has supervised more than 20 completed PhD students as well as contributing to undergraduate science and medical teaching. He is a founding and continuing member of the London Pain Consortium, a Wellcome Trust Integrated Physiology Initiative, which funds a group of scientists in London and Oxford studying pain mechanisms and educating young scientists in this field.

He has authored more than 330 refereed publications including Science and Nature, edited three books and written many chapters. He has also been quoted in the media and in magazine articles as an expert on pain remediation.

Dickenson was elected a Fellow of the Academy of Medical Sciences in 2007.

== Research ==
At UCL, the focus of his group's research has been based on understanding the transmission and control of pain, how neuronal systems alter in pathophysiological states and how novel and licensed drugs produce their effects with the aim of translating the basic research into clinical applications.

Early studies described the neuronal basis of Diffuse Noxious Inhibitory controls (DNIC). Tony's group was also the first to show the NMDA receptor mediation of wind-up and its role in persistent pain. Continuing work on central hyperexcitability has been seminal in understanding of pain in animals and humans.

Studies include collaborations with Prof Frank Porreca of the Department of Pharmacology at the University of Arizona, investigating opioid pathways; collaborations with Prof John Wood of the Molecular Nociception Group, examining tissue specific deletion of targets and studies with Prof Annette Dolphin involving the role of voltage-dependent Ca^{2+} channels in pathological states.
