= Jesse Dickinson =

American legislator

Jesse Dickinson was a state legislator in Indiana. A Democrat, he served in the Indiana House of Representatives and the Indiana Senate.

His son Valjean Dickinson also served in government as did his wife, Jesse Dickinson's daughter-in-law, Mae Dickinson.

== See also ==
- List of African-American officeholders (1900–1959)
