= Frances Dickinson (musician) =

New Zealand-based musician and vocal coach

Frances Dickinson worked as a New Zealand-based musician and vocal coach between 2010-2019. She was a vocalist for alt-folk band Forbidden Joe and a vocal coach for New Zealand recording artists such as Lorde.

== Forbidden Joe ==
Dickinson was the lead singer and songwriter in the alt-folk band Forbidden Joe. The trio formed in 2008 after they met at the Devonport Folk Club (Auckland) and went on to record an EP entitled Oh, what a queer sensation later that year. The EP was described as being "very contemporary and yet at the same time having everything that you'd want from a really traditional folk view" whilst demonstrating "really good vocals (and) some really good songwriting" by Manu Taylor on National Radio's Nine till Noon music review.

Music reviewer Graham Reid discussed Dickinson's songwriting in a review of the EP where he remarked that " as a writer, just on this one showing, she seems to be a rare one". Aside from one co-write with Arthur Baysting on the full album, she did not write any more songs with Forbidden Joe.

Forbidden Joe produced their only full-length album In Mourning for the Pride of Petravore in 2010, which was part funded by Creative New Zealand. The trio separated in 2011 and their album was a finalist for the Vodafone New Zealand Music Award for Best Folk Album in the same year.

== Vocal coaching ==
Dickinson was a vocal coach and worked with a number of New Zealand artists. In 2013 Dickinson worked with Ruby Frost while she was a judge on New Zealand's X Factor show. She has also coached NZ Silver Scroll winner Lips, Six60 and actress Robyn Malcolm.

=== Work with Lorde ===
Dickinson was hired in 2011 by Universal Music to coach Ella Yellich-OConnor (who would later adopt the stage name Lorde) twice a week while she was signed to their label on a development deal. They worked together for over a year; Lorde described working with Dickinson in an interview for Rolling Stone Magazine:

"One of the coolest things was that I could have vocal lessons twice a week," she recalls. "I've always had a low voice, but you can find a couple of shitty covers on YouTube from when I was 12 or whatever, and my voice is quite nasal. Strange tonally. I got to strip all that stuff back and kind of rebuild the machinery, take a lot of twang out of my sound.".

Soon after her work with Dickinson, Lorde recorded her EP and full-length album. She won the award for Best Pop Solo Performance for her vocal performance on her song "Royals" at the 2014 Grammys.
