= Where My Wellies Take Me =

2012 British children's novel

- Author: Michael Morpurgo; Clare Morpurgo
- Illustrator: Olivia Lomenech Gill
- Cover artist: Olivia Lomenech Gill
- Language: English
- Genre: Children's book
- Set in: Devonshire
- Publisher: Templar Books
- Publication date: 2012
- Publication place: Great Britain
- Pages: 90
- ISBN: 978-0-7636-6629-3
- OCLC: 798412059
- Dewey Decimal: 828
- LC Class: 2012954328

Where My Wellies Take Me is a British children's novel written by Michael and Clare Morpurgo, and illustrated by Olivia Lomenech Gill. It was originally published in Great Britain by Templar Books in 2012. This is a first collaboration for Morpurgo and his wife. The story is set in rural Devon, in southwest England, the Morpurgos' longtime home. It is based on Clare's childhood experiences of growing up in rural Devonshire. All royalties from the book go to their charity, Farms for City Children.

The book was short-listed for the Carnegie Medal, and the Kate Greenaway Medal, for Gill's illustrations. It was also nominated for the Biennial of Illustration Bratislava, and won the English Association Picture Book Fiction Award. The "Wellies" in the book's title comes from Wellington boots.

== Synopsis ==
The book is narrated by Pippa, a fictionalised characterisation of a young Clare Morprugo, who loves to stay with her Aunty Peggy in Devonshire. Her first-person narration of her adventures wandering around the countryside is on notebook paper in cursive writing, where she shares meeting up with the local villagers. Along the way she records her encounters with spiders, chickens, a fisherman, and a farmer on a tractor; and shares her favorite pastimes: horseback riding and poetry. The poetry selections are some of the authors favourite poems and set in Times New Roman.

The range of the poems vary from traditional rhymes to English-language poets writing about cows, lambs and meadow mice, among other topics. A partial list of notable poets in the book include: Ted Hughes, A. E. Housman, William Butler Yeats, Rudyard Kipling, Walter de la Mare, John Tams, William Blake, Dylan Thomas, John Masefield, Christina Rossetti, Robert Browning, Edward Lear, Robert Frost and William Shakespeare.

A partial list of notable poems include: The Lamb, I Had a Little Nut Tree, The Owl and the Pussy-Cat, The Song of Hiawatha, Incy wincy spider, Fern Hill and Stopping by Woods on a Snowy Evening. The book begins with an apt verse from John Masefield:

It is good to be out on the road, and going one knows not where,
Going through meadow and village, one knows not whither or why;
Through the grey light drift of the dust, in the keen cool rush of the air,
Under the flying white clouds, and the broad blue lift of the sky.

And to halt at the chattering brook, in a tall green fern at the brink
Where the harebell grows, and the gorse, and the foxgloves purple and white;
Where the shifty-eyed delicate deer troop down to the brook to drink
When the stars are mellow and large at the coming on of the night.

O, to feel the beat of the rain, and the homely smell of the earth,
Is a tune for the blood to jig to, and joy past power of words;
And the blessed green comely meadows are all a-ripple with mirth
At the noise of the lambs at play and the dear wild cry of the birds.

— Tewkesbury Road by John Masefield

== Background ==
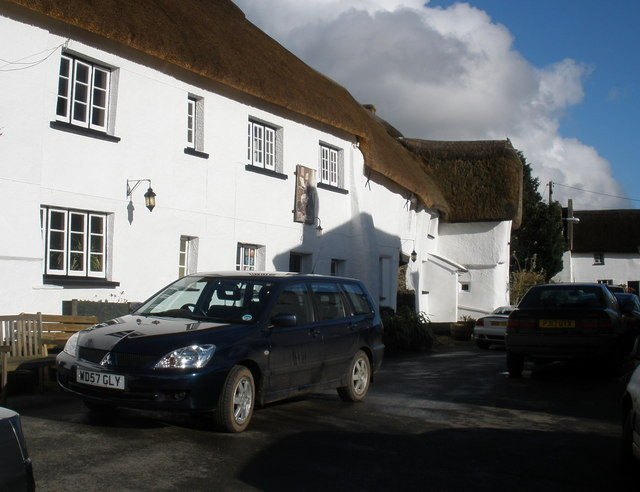
Duke of York in Iddesleigh

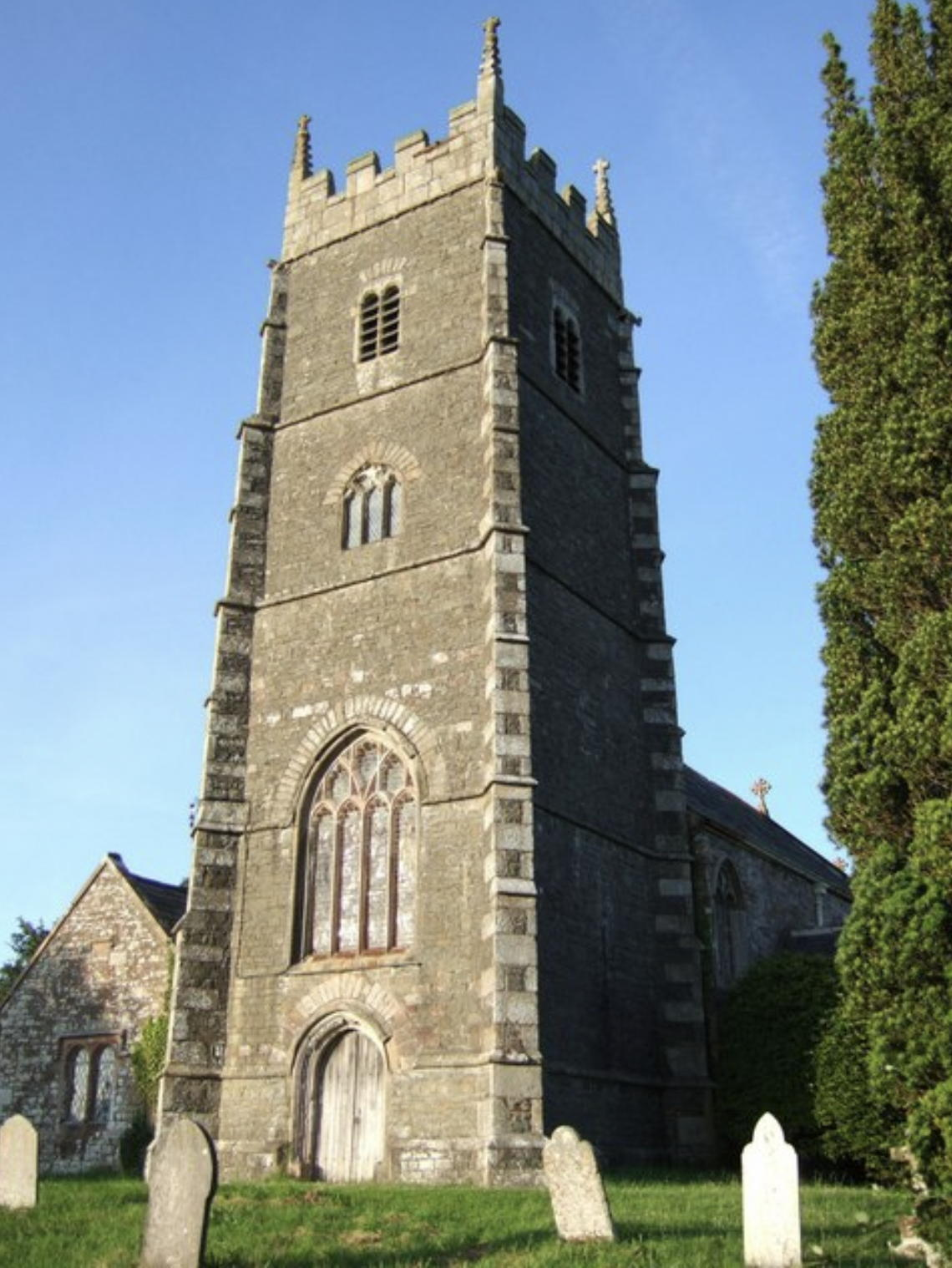
St James's Church in Iddesleigh is featured in the book

Morpurgo says the inspiration for the book was his wife Clare's childhood experiences of visiting rural Devonshire. He explains that as a young girl, she would come to Iddesleigh for her summer holidays and stay with the poet Seán Rafferty and his wife Peggy, who had left London to run the Duke of York pub in the village. Morpurgo also noted that the town has been an inspiration for his books, War Horse, Farm Boy and Private Peaceful.

Clare Morpurgo is the daughter of Allen Lane, a British publisher who founded Penguin Books in 1935. Her father was born and brought up in Devon. She said what Pippa narrates in the book is "exactly what she did" when she visited Iddesleigh as a young girl. She recalls that she was allowed to "wander, go scrumping, pick blackberries, and ride a horse called Captain", from a nearby farmer's house. She said all the portraits in the book illustrated by Olivia Lomenech Gill are of real people from Devon, and the poems they chose for the book, were some of the couple's favourites, or they had a connection to the poets themselves, like Ted Hughes and Seán Rafferty, who were close friends with the couple. She further noted that she "chose the poems without reading the story and we had to fit them around that, but she found that they fitted like a jigsaw". She also said it was her fondness for the area which motivated the couple to move there in the 1970s, where they set up their charity, Farms for City Children.

This was Gills debut at illustrating a book, and she did her research by going to Devon, and visiting the people and places from Clare's childhood. She then returned to her studio to create a mock-up of the book. She notes that while "the poems relate to what Pippa sees and does on her walk, she felt it was down to the illustrations to link or glue the two elements together". The authors said they had previously seen some of her work, and thought it to be "very fresh and unique; her pictures told a story, so it seemed to us that she would illustrate stories wonderfully well".

== Release ==
The book was originally published in 2012 by Templar Books in Great Britain. In 2013, it was nominated for the Biennial of Illustration Bratislava, and won the English Association Picture Book Fiction Award. In 2014, the book was short-listed for the Carnegie Medal, and for the Kate Greenaway Medal as well, for Gill's illustrations.

== Reception ==
Kirkus Reviews wrote "Gill's mixed-media artwork features delicately nuanced paintings and sketches of local animals, trees and flowers; along with old churches, villages and fields; occasional flaps, gatefolds and transparent pages enhance the striking presentation". Publishers Weekly also complimented Gill's illustrations, saying her "closely observed drawings of wildlife, farmers, and landscapes tinted in gentle, rained-out colors join hand-lettered sections of prose; anglophiles will be eager to share this bit of British countryside with children they know ".

Marian McLeod of the School Library Journal said "the book has the look of a nature Journal/scrapbook, with layered, collagelike illustrations, primarily in browns and grays, on every page; Pippa's notes are written in cursive throughout, which may prove challenging to younger readers". Marilyn Brocklehurst wrote in The Bookseller that the book "could be just a poetry book but it is so much more, partly because the poems sit so comfortably in the story and therefore take on more significance, and partly because the story and illustrations are so perfectly matched".

Midwest Book Review stated that "the seamless juxtaposition of narrative, illustration and verse across a double-page spread is repeated beautifully throughout the book; the illustrations, mostly natural hues with translucent overlays and interesting page flaps, are fine art in themselves". The Horn Book Guide said "the highlight here is the inclusion of forty poems by beloved poets; artful overlays and foldout pages provide further interest; the cursive font of Pippa's narrative may make the book difficult for some children to enjoy".

== See also ==
- History of poetry
