= The Day the World Stopped Turning =

The Day the World Stopped Turning may refer to:

== Books ==
- The Day the World Stopped Turning, the title of the American printing of Michael Morpurgo's novel Flamingo Boy
- The Day the World Stopped Turning, by Michael Morpurgo

== Songs ==
- "The Day the World Stopped Turning", on Gary Barlow's album Music Played by Humans
- "The Day the World Stopped Turning", on Stackridge's album A Victory for Common Sense
- "The Day the World Stopped Turning", on Philip Springer's the album The Voice That Is!
