= Lac d'Ansabère =

Lake in French Pyrénées

Lake of Ansabère Lac d'Ansabère
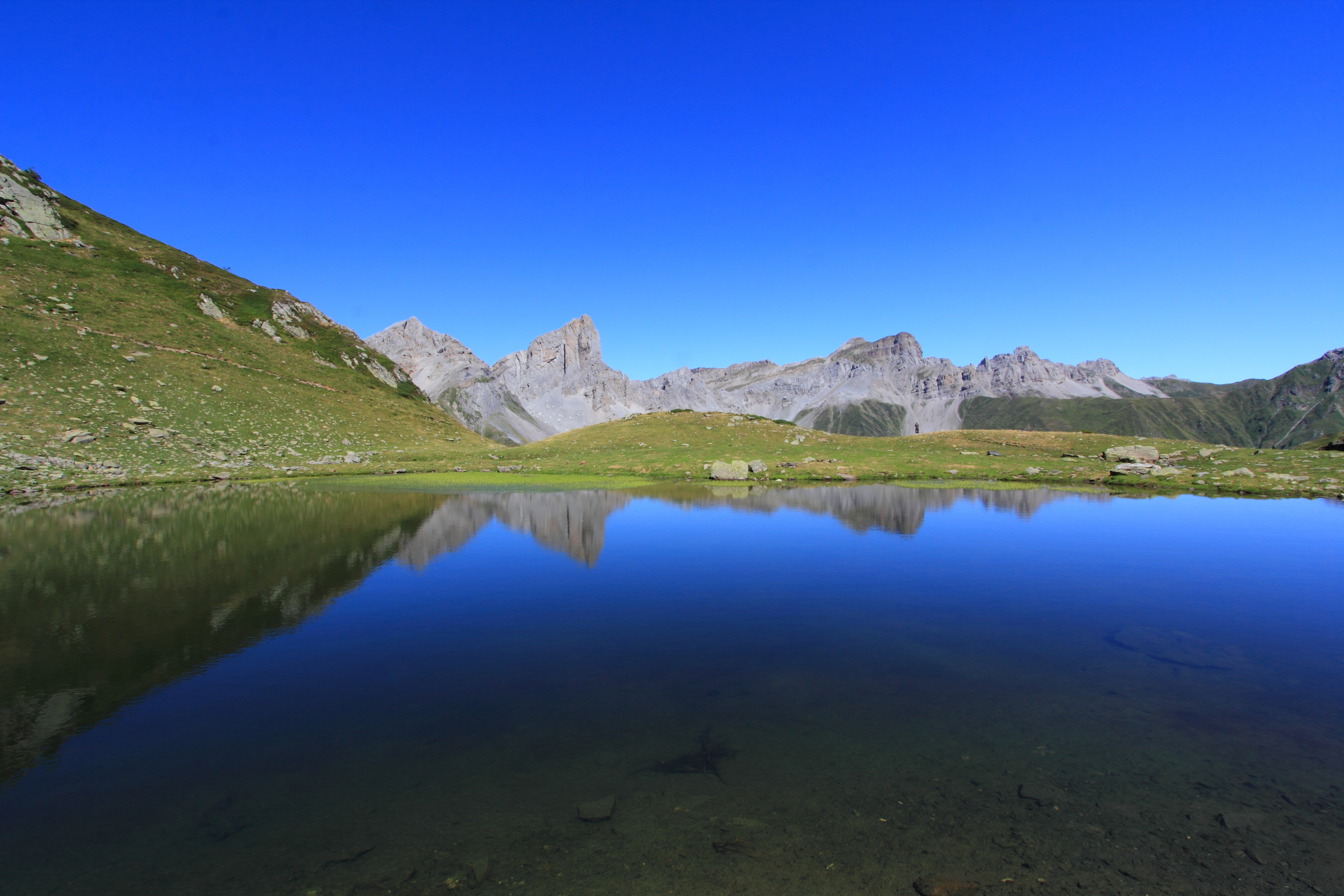
- The lake with the view on two peaks: the Grande Aiguille d'Ansabère (center left) and the Mesa de los Tres Reyes (center right).

- Location within France
- Location: Pyrénées-Atlantiques, Pyrénées
- Coordinates: 42.887999°N 0.708573°W
- Basin countries: France
- Surface area: 0.002 km^{2} (0.00077 sq mi)
- Surface elevation: 1,859 m (6,099 ft)

Lake of Ansabère (French: Lac d'Ansabère) is a lake in Pyrénées-Atlantiques, Pyrénées, France. At an elevation of 1859 m, its surface area is 0.002 km².

This lake is the westernmost of the mountain lakes of the Pyrenees, together with Lake of Chourique and Lake of Lhurs, all located at the same longitude.

== Itinerary ==
From the village of Lescun, go between the bridges of Masousa and Lamareich, and follow the track into the small valley of Ansabère. After the bridge of Lamary at 1,171 m (3,842 ft), one must follow the footpath until the Ansabère huts at 1,570 m (5,151 ft), dominated by the Aiguilles d'Ansabère and Pic d'Ansabère. From there, the path continues to the left around a rocky chaos, and climbs in grassy slopes to reach the basin housing the miniature lake of Ansabère.
