= When Fishes Flew: The Story of Elena's War =

2021 British children's novel

- First edition cover
- Author: Michael Morpurgo
- Illustrator: George Butler
- Language: English
- Genre: Fantasy; children's novel
- Publisher: HarperCollins
- Publication date: 30 September 2021
- Publication place: United Kingdom
- Pages: 192
- ISBN: 978-0-00-835218-9

When Fishes Flew: The Story of Elena's War is a British children's novel written by Michael Morpurgo, and illustrated by George Butler It was published by HarperCollins and released in 2021.

== Plot ==
Nandi, an Australian-Greek seventeen-year-old girl, decides to visit her great-aunt Elena in Ithaca, because Elena no longer travels to Australia to visit her family there, due to her age. Upon arrival on the island, Nandi discovers that her aunt is missing. She sets out to find her missing aunt, and as she walks on the beach pondering just how to do that, she encounters shoals of small black fish, and one much bigger flying fish, a "magical fish", who is the incarnation of the Greek god Proteus, who can speak, and who can explain to Nandi the reasons her Aunt Elena is missing, and how she came to be a Greek hero of World War II.

== Background ==
Morpurgo said he was inspired to write the novel because of "two strange stories that happened in the same day". He noted how he went on holiday with his wife to Ithaca, and the couple was staying at a house on the beach, and they came to realize that this beach was where, according to legend, Odysseus walked when he came back from the Trojan War. In the first strange story, he explained as he was sitting on the beach with his wife in the evenings, reading a book, he also observed a Greek family who came down to the shore about the same time every day. On one of those evenings, "the older lady of the family beckoned us to come over". So the couple went over to visit, and the woman "cupped her hands in the water and picked up a flying fish. She said, 'they talk, you know', and stroked the top of the fish's head and the fish made a blabbing, gibberish sort of talking noise".

After witnessing this event, Morpurgo stated they ended up strolling around that night "thinking of nothing else but that flying fish". He remarked how he was firmly attached in the Odyssey and Greek gods mindset, and he came to believe that "this fish must have been Proteus – the son of the sea-god Poseidon – a God who could change into whatever he wanted to be". He went on to tell how in the second strange story that happened to the couple that same evening, they met an old man sitting outside his house, and they struck up a conversation with him, and upon hearing his "strong Australian accent, asked him if he was Australian". The man said no, "I'm a Greek, but a Greek Australian". The man proceeded to tell him and his wife how he had to move from the island to Australia to live with relatives there, when he was five years old, due to an terrible earthquake in 1954. The man explained he ended up living in Australia for a number of years, but had made a promise to himself that he would return to Ithaca and rebuild his old house and live there. Morpurgo said these two stories served as his inspiration for the book, and also noted how sometimes "writers need a lot of luck to write, you'll have extremely flat times where you can't write anything, then other times you'll come across the extraordinary".

== Reviews ==
I'm not sure how else young people can discover about the world out there unless they read about it. With books you have to make an effort to place them in your imagination and your intellect. By doing this, it grows your take on the world. You learn to look at the world through your own eyes and experience, then realise that there are other cultures, other languages, and they have much to give to the world.

— Michael Morpurgo

Bridget Carrington from IBBY UK remarked that Morpurgo "introduces his readers to the centuries of civil war and insurrection in Greece, and links it with the outcome for people around the world who currently face recent or ongoing civil wars, and, like some Aunty Ellie helped, who flee their own country to find safety and support from elsewhere in the world". She thought the allusion to Homer and the Odyssey defined the "setting of the story both mythically and historically". She concluded that the novel "specifically offers readers a deeply thoughtful, often heart-wrenching, but ultimately comforting narrative ... and it perfectly reflects the humanitarian core of the work of this author".

Alex O'Connell from The Times noted that Morpurgo "is known for his emotionally packed animal stories and his historical novels for children". He went on to say that this story "combines the two, but also throws in a generous pinch of classical history". He also complimented George Butler's "evocative illustrations; for weaving together Greek myths and the horrors of war with the story of a quiet hero who, in old age, continues to help those in need. Much like one of his flying, talking fish, he makes the incredible a reality". In closing, he thought the novel would "appeal especially to those who enjoyed Victoria Hislop's Maria's Island".

Peter Andrews of the School Librarian wrote that "Morpurgo's storytelling is direct, grabbing readers' attention immediately. The introductory section could perhaps have been edited to avoid some repetition, but the impression of all things Greek is pervasive and vivid. The use of Proteus, one of the more attractive of the ancient gods, as a story-telling device lends an element of magic to a serious subject, making the book perhaps more suitable for an older age-group than the fantasy would suggest".

== See also ==
- Greek mythology
- Homer's Ithaca
- Proteus in popular culture
