= Little Fox =

Little Fox may refer to:

- The Little Foxes, a 1939 play by Lillian Hellman
  - The Little Foxes (film), a 1941 adaptation of Lillian Hellman's play of the same name.
- Little Foxes, a 1984 book by Michael Morpurgo
- The Little Fox, a 1981 Hungarian adaptation of István Fekete's Vuk
