= Lescun =

- Commune
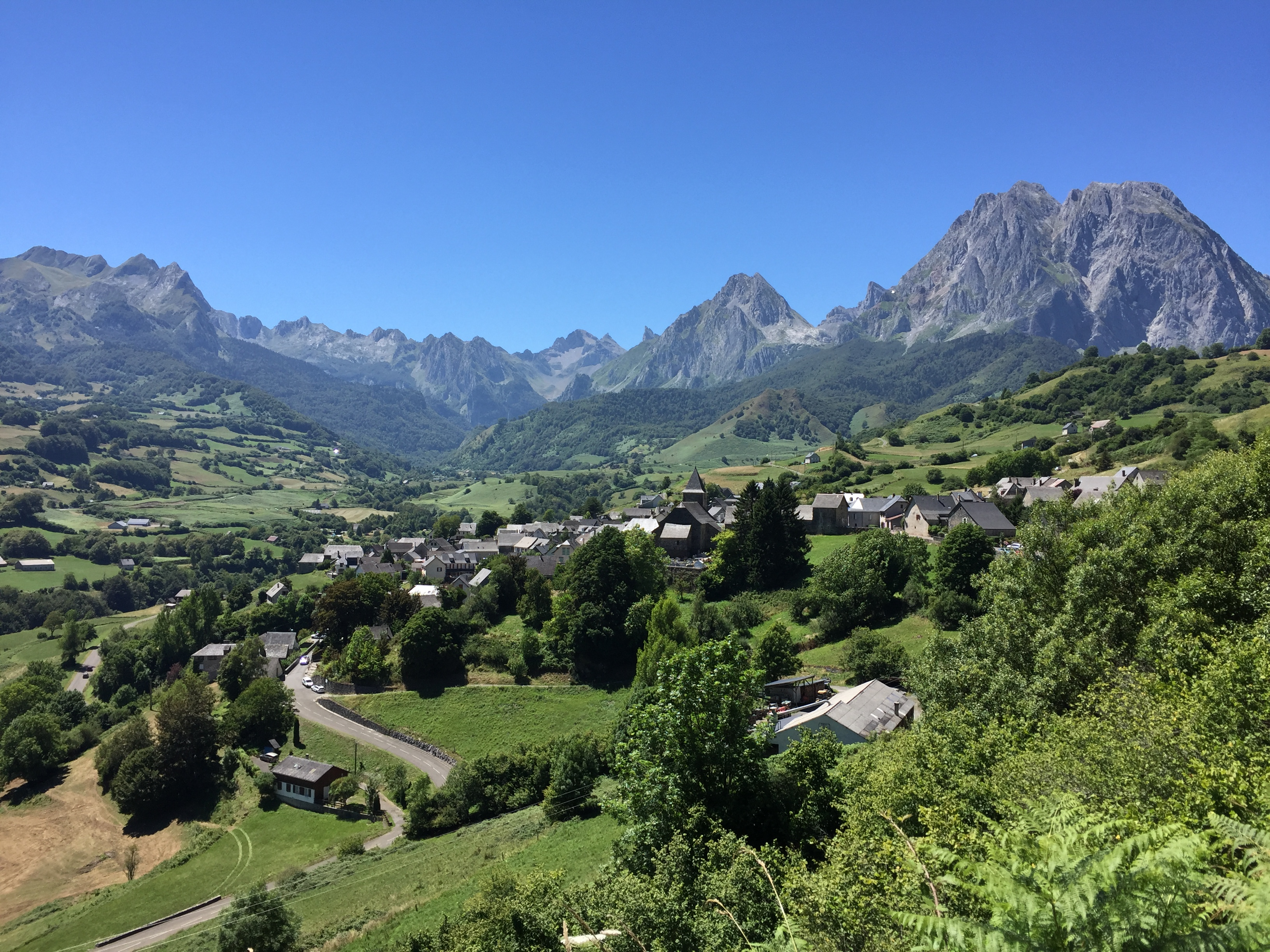
- View of Lescun
- Location of Lescun
- Location within France Location within Nouvelle-Aquitaine
- Coordinates: 42°56′06″N 0°38′01″W
- Country: France
- Region: Nouvelle-Aquitaine
- Department: Pyrénées-Atlantiques
- Arrondissement: Oloron-Sainte-Marie
- Canton: Oloron-Sainte-Marie-1

Government
  - Mayor (2020–2026): Danielle Gay
- Area^{1}: 61 km^{2} (24 sq mi)
- Elevation: 900 m (3,000 ft)
- Highest elevation: 2,504 m (8,215 ft)
- Lowest elevation: 468 m (1,535 ft)
- Population (2023): 163
  - Density: 2.7/km^{2} (6.9/sq mi)
- Time zone: UTC+01:00 (CET)
  - Summer (DST): UTC+02:00 (CEST)
- INSEE/Postal code: 64336 /64490
- ^{1} French Land Register data, which excludes lakes, ponds, glaciers > 1 km^{2} (0.386 sq mi or 247 acres) and river estuaries.

Lescun (French pronunciation: [lɛskœ̃]) is a village and a commune in the Pyrénées-Atlantiques department in south-western France.

It is at an elevation of approximately 900 metres (3,000 feet) in a grand cirque.

Lescun is situated on the GR 10 long-distance footpath traversing the Pyrenees. Combined with the dramatic scenery of its mountain backdrop, this makes it a popular focus for hikers and climbers. Several lakes and summits can for example be reached from Lescun, including the lake of Lhurs, the lake of Ansabère, the Billare, the Pic d'Anie, and the Grande Aiguille d'Ansabère.

== Lescun in popular culture ==
Lescun the setting for the book Waiting for Anya by Michael Morpurgo.

== See also ==
- Another distant picture
- Communes of the Pyrénées-Atlantiques department
