= Waiting for Anya =

1990 children's novel by Michael Morpurgo

- First edition
- Author: Michael Morpurgo
- Language: English
- Genre: Historical novel
- Publisher: William Heinemann
- Publication date: 1990
- Publication place: United Kingdom
- Media type: Print
- Pages: 178
- ISBN: 0-434-95205-2

Waiting for Anya is a British children's novel written by Michael Morpurgo. It was first published in Great Britain in 1990, by William Heinemann. It is set in Lescun, in a mountainous region of southern France on the border with Spain. It was shortlisted for the Carnegie Medal; nominated by the American Library Association as Best Book for Young Adults; it was a School Library Journal Best Book of the Year; it was a NCSS-CBC Notable Children's Trade Book in the field of Social Studies, and was a finalist for the Guardian Children's Fiction Prize. In 2020, it was adapted into a film with the same name.

== Summary ==
The novel is set in the French village of Lescun during the Second World War. Jo Lalande is a young shepherd who is enjoying his childhood; but when his father goes to fight in the war, Jo has to become the man of the house. After an incident with a bear, Jo meets a mysterious man in the forest. He follows the man to his home and learns his secret - he is a Jew named Benjamin who is waiting for his daughter Anya to come find him as they were split from each other, and he is responsible for smuggling Jewish children to safety across the border into Spain, with the help of his mother-in-law, the Widow Horcada. Jo starts to help them to prove that he can be trusted.

German soldiers move into town, and things become much more difficult. Although most of the town's inhabitants come to accept the German occupation, the task of getting the Jewish children across the border becomes more dangerous. Jo, his grandfather Henri, Benjamin and the Widow Horcada devise a plan to get the children across. The plan requires the whole town to help the children escape, and relies on the German soldiers not noticing what is happening — but if they are caught, their lives will not be worth living.

After the children have been taken safely across into Spain, except for Benjamin and Léah, the bear that Benjamin saved earlier ends up getting him caught by the Germans. The German soldiers find them and take them to a concentration camp, where they are presumed to have died. Shortly thereafter the war ends and Jo's grandfather marries the Widow Horcada. One day a telegram arrives from Anya who has found her way home.

== Characters ==
- Jo - The main character, a shepherd boy, around 12 years old.
- Benjamin - He lost his daughter Anya, and is waiting for her to arrive in Lescun.
- Widow Horcada - A secretive old widow and Benjamin's mother in law.
- Grandpere- Jo's grandfather; involved in the smuggling of children.
- Hubert - A kind handicapped boy who is very good friends with Jo
- Papa - Jo's father, a prisoner of war (POW), who is in a German prison for most of the story.
- Rouf - Jo's faithful, cute, white, fluffy, dog.
- Michael - The leader of the Polish Jews, and the only one who interacts with Jo through games of chess.

== Release ==
The book was originally published by William Heinemann in the United Kingdom in 1990. Accolades for the novel, include being shortlisted for the Carnegie Medal; nominated by the American Library Association as Best Book for Young Adults; it was a School Library Journal Best Book of the Year; it was a NCSS-CBC Notable Children's Trade Book in the field of Social Studies, and was a finalist for the Guardian Children's Fiction Prize.

== Reviews ==
Ellen Fader from The Horn Book Magazine said the book is an "action-packed historical novel that is gripping, and a clearly written story. Morpurgo's characters rise above the two-dimensional, giving young people much to ponder in the areas of good versus evil and hero versus villain". Susan Harding wrote in the School Library Journal that there are "no villains and no larger-than-life heroes, just human beings following what conscience or duty tells them is right. In its understated style and gentle telling of a harsh lesson, the story is reminiscent of Lois Lowry's Number the Stars".

Publishers Weekly also noted the similarities between this book and Number the Stars, stating "this well-plotted novel features a young Gentile hero battling the Germans in their war against the Jews". They pointed out "some key elements are historically improbable – chiefly, a German officer's partial rejection of Nazi principles – the adventure of the Jews' escape into Spain is both gripping and temperate". In her review for The Guardian, Barbara Sherrard-Smith wrote "the sense of place and time are vividly captured. But the novel is more than a first-rate adventure yarn: the taut writing, subtle characterisation and thought-provoking issues linger long in the mind".

== Film adaptation ==
In 2020, it was adapted into a war drama film co-written by Ben Cookson and Toby Torlesse. It was directed by Cookson, and stars Noah Schnapp, Thomas Kretschmann, Frederick Schmidt, Jean Reno, and Anjelica Huston. In his review for The New York Times, Ben Kenigsberg wrote that the film "is not so sentimental that it imagines every character can escape death, but it has little use for complexity; this film suffers from other deficits of verisimilitude. Characters speak English with such strong accents it's odd that the director didn't opt for French and German. And as harrowing as Jo's ordeal may be, the movie doesn't fail to provide the obligatory uplift".
