= Private Peaceful (film) =

- Film poster
- Directed by: Pat O'Connor
- Screenplay by: Simon Reade
- Based on: Private Peaceful by Michael Morpurgo
- Produced by: Guy de Beaujeu; Simon Reade
- Starring: Jack O'Connell; George MacKay
- Cinematography: Jerzy Zieliński
- Edited by: Humphrey Dixon
- Music by: Rachel Portman
- Production company: Fluidity Films
- Distributed by: Eagle Rock Entertainment
- Release date: 12 October 2012
- Running time: 102 minutes
- Country: United Kingdom
- Language: English
- Box office: US$132,505

Private Peaceful is a 2012 British war drama film directed by Pat O'Connor and starring Jack O'Connell and George MacKay. It is based on the 2003 novel of the same name by Michael Morpurgo. The film marks the final released performance of Richard Griffiths as well as his last credited film before his death the following year.

== Plot ==
The tale is of a young man named Thomas "Tommo" Peaceful, who tells the story in account format from the past to the present day events of his experiences. His eldest brother, "Big Joe", has learning difficulties due to brain damage at birth, and is always looked out for by his younger brothers. The earlier part of the story tells of his life as a boy, before the Great War; the tale of his love for Molly – a beautiful girl he had a lot of feelings for and grew to love besottedly; and Charlie Peaceful, Tommo's brother who is older than him, but younger than Joe.

Also early on in the story, Tommo and his dad go woodcutting where a tree nearly falls on Tommo. However, Tommo’s dad saves him but in the process gets killed by the tree. Tommo kept it a secret that he was the reason his father is dead.

The trio had grown up together; their mischievous adventures included braving the beastly "Grandma Wolf" (the boys' great-aunt – also referred to as the Wolfwoman), defying the Colonel and skinny-dipping, the latter leaving a large impression on Tommo. They had also seen an airplane together – the first people in their village to do so.

Charlie, Molly and later Tommo all find jobs on the estate or in the village. Charlie, being older than Tommo, had always protected and looked out for his younger brother. Also, Charlie and Molly become closer as they are both older than Tommo, while Tommo begins to be left out. Tommo suspects that Charlie and Molly are in love. While they were skinny-dipping, Tommo notices them having a lot more fun together without him. Charlie and Molly used to secretly meet by the brook where it is revealed they kissed and had sex multiple times together. Molly becomes pregnant. She is thrown out of her house, and moves in with the Peacefuls.

Tommo became heartbroken after the couple rushed to get married a short time later in the village church before Tommo and Charlie go to France to fight in World War I. All through this time, Tommo recorded his feelings in the novel. The rest of the story describes the brothers' experiences of the war: their Sergeant "Horrible" Hanley, the near-misses during the battle on the front line, and Charlie's continued protection of Tommo.

During a charge of the German lines, Charlie disobeys a direct order from Sergeant Hanley and stays with Tommo while he is injured on no-man's-land. As a result, Charlie is accused of cowardice and given a court-martial. At dawn, Charlie is marched before the firing squad, where he is executed.

The story ends with Tommo preparing for the Battle of the Somme.

In 2006, 306 British and Commonwealth soldiers who (like Charlie) were executed for offences including cowardice, desertion, insubordination, and sleeping at their posts were posthumously pardoned.

== Cast ==
- Jack O'Connell as Charlie Peaceful
  - Hero Fiennes Tiffin as Young Charlie
- George MacKay as Tommo Peaceful
  - Samuel Bottomley as Young Tommo
- Alexandra Roach as Molly Monks
  - Izzy Meikle-Small as Young Molly
- Richard Griffiths as The Colonel
- Frances de la Tour as Grandma Wolf
- John Lynch as Sergeant Hanley
- Maxine Peake as Hazel Peaceful
- Stephen Kennedy as James Peaceful
- Anna Carteret as Colonel's Wife
- Eline Powell as Anna

== Reception ==
The film has a 63% rating on Rotten Tomatoes. Peter Bradshaw of The Guardian gave the film three stars out of five. Robbie Collin of The Daily Telegraph gave the film two stars out of five. Rob Humanick of Slant Magazine gave the film two and a half stars out of four.
