= George Butler (artist) =

British artist

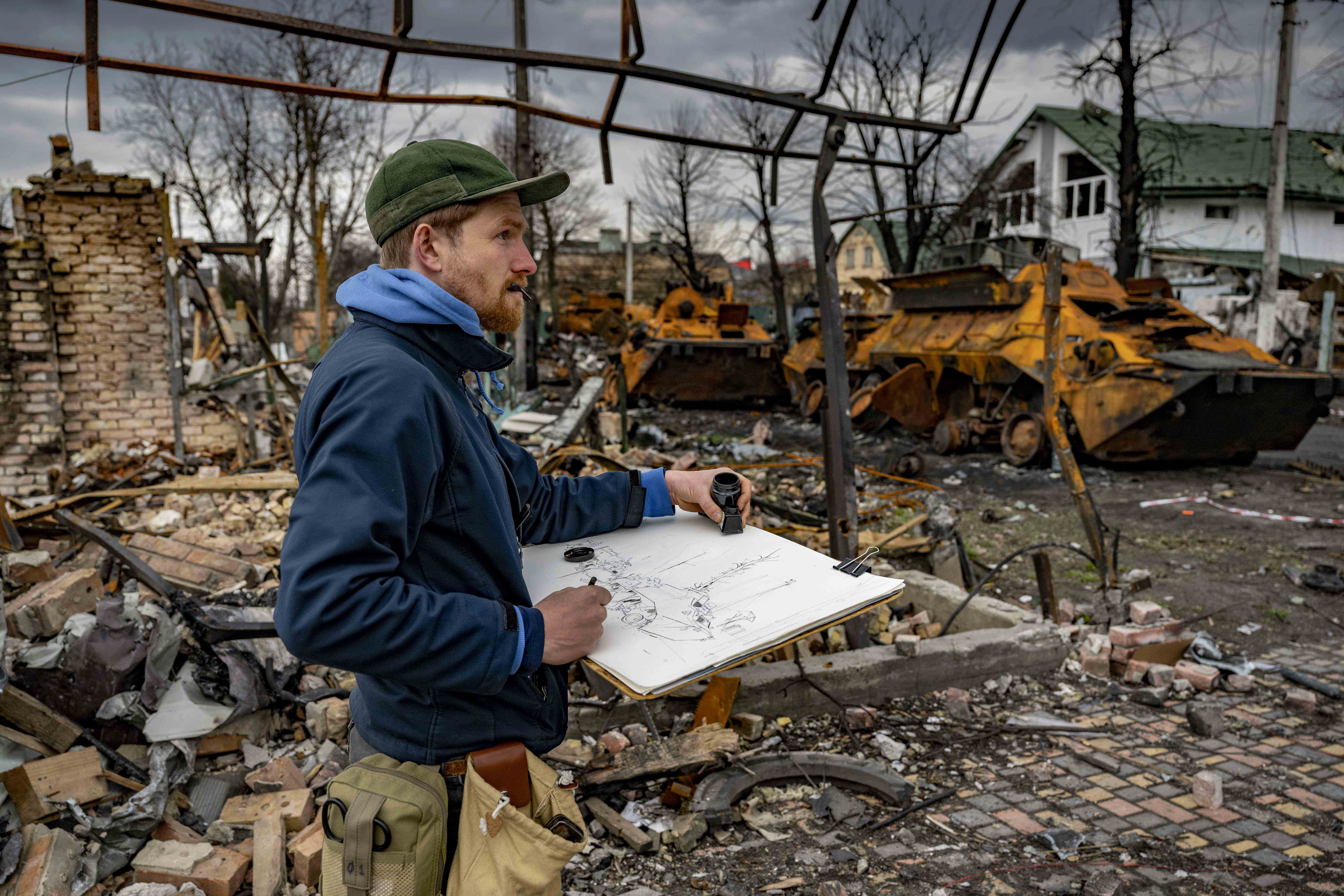
George Butler drawing in Ukraine

George Butler (born 11 April 1985) is a British artist and reportage illustrator known for drawing conflict zones, climate issues, humanitarian crisis and social issues. His work, done in-situ in pen, ink and watercolour, has won multiple awards and seen him labelled “the Paul Nash of our era” by Michael Morpurgo.

Butler has drawn leprosy clinics in Nepal, militias in Yemen, mass graves in Ukraine, caesarean operations in Afghanistan, oil fields in Myanmar, gold mines in Ghana and most recently in earthquake damaged towns in Turkey and Syria. His work has been shown in the Imperial War Museum, Lambeth Palace and is in collection in the V&A Museum and the National Army Museum. Butler won Best Illustrated Story at the ASME Awards (USA) in 2023.

== Career ==
In 2006, in his final year at Kingston Art College, Butler was embedded with the British Army in Afghanistan drawing the soldiers waiting to go to war in Lashkar Gah and Kabul. Since then he has been working in the same pen and ink style always drawing from life.

In August 2012 he walked from Turkey into Syria where, as a guest of the rebel Free Syrian Army, he drew the civil war damaged town of Azaz for the Times and Guardian.

His work focuses on providing a deliberately slow alternative to rolling news channels, illustrating the personal stories of those he meets and highlighting the vulnerability of their situations.

In the years that followed he visited and revisited, Syria, Yemen, Iraq, Libya, Tajikistan, Myanmar, Cameroon, Nigeria, Mali, Gabon, Angola, Kenya, India and others.

Butler has drawn militias, leprosy clinics, goldmines, oil fields, court rooms, caesarean operations, demining projects, hospital wards, death row subjects, HIV patients, prisons in Syria, mass graves, army convoys and others.

His drawings have been published around the world by The Times, the BBC and The Guardian (UK) Monocle, New York Times, NPR, VQR, and CNN (USA) and SZ Magazin, Der Spiegel, ARD television (Germany).

He has been commissioned by Oxfam, Amnesty International, the Halo Trust and EMERGENCY.

In 2022 Butler spent several days in Ukraine’s Kharkiv Metro drawing the lives of those who lived underground avoiding Russian bombardment. These drawings can be seen in the National Archive at the V&A Museum.

== Books ==
Butler has also illustrated books, most notably Michael Morpurgo’s War Horse and When Fishes Flew.

His own book, Drawn Across Borders, was shortlisted for the Kate Greenaway Award in 2022.

Drawn Across Borders saw some positive reviews:

The Scotsman called it: “A hauntingly beautiful book which will live with you for a long time,” while Booklist said: “This is a work of art, compassion and activism."

Bear Grylls said: “This book powerfully shows the raw struggle and heart-breaking humanity from some of our world’s highest tension spots - all told through art.”

== Exhibitions ==
His work has been exhibited in Victoria and Albert Museum, National Army Museum, and Imperial War Museum North.

== Charity Work ==
Butler has been involved with several charities, most notably the Hands Up Foundation which he cofounded in 2014. The charity has raised £7.4 million for humanitarian causes in Syria and Butler is the chairman.

He also provided a body of work to support the CoExistence Campaign run by Ruth Ganesh and the British Asian Trust which saw 100 life size lantana elephants situated in the parks of London to raise awareness and funds for the human wildlife conflict in Asia.

== Praise and awards ==
Butler won Best Illustrated Story at the ASME Awards (USA) in 2023 and his own book, Drawn Across Borders, was shortlisted for the Kate Greenaway Award in 2022.
