= The Nine Lives of Montezuma =

2017 British children's novel

- First edition
- Author: Michael Morpurgo
- Illustrator: Margery Gill
- Language: English
- Genre: Children's novel
- Publisher: Kaye & Ward
- Publication date: 1 March 1980
- Publication place: Great Britain
- Media type: Print
- Pages: 87
- ISBN: 978-0-71-821239-1 Hardback
- OCLC: 71268990

The Nine Lives of Montezuma is a 1980 British children's novel written by Michael Morpurgo. It was originally published by Kaye & Ward in 1980. It is about the exciting life of a farm cat called Montezuma who has many brushes with death.

== Plot ==
Montezuma (Monty) is a ginger cat, with blue-green-yellow eyes, and loves hunting and playing with his owner, Matthew. The story evolves from him being a young kitten to him growing into an old tomcat. As Montezuma grows up, he has fights with various cats and dogs; he ends up getting lost twice; he falls into a pond; he meets Daisy the Cow, and Sam the farm dog, and along the way, he also meets some characters who are nice to him, and some who are not so nice to him. But in the end, he winds up getting back to Matthew.

== Reception ==
InfoPet said the book is "deftly told, and moving". A review in Junior Bookshelf said the story "is told without sentimentality, though not without sentiment". The Guardian stated that "the small black and white illustrations dotted throughout the chapters work really well to help you picture what is going on in the book; the book is quite short, but effective". They also noted how the book is organized into the cats nine lives, instead of chapters.
