= Kensuke's Kingdom =

Children's novel by Michael Morpurgo

- First edition
- Author: Michael Morpurgo
- Original title: Kensuke Nagasaki
- Illustrator: Michael Foreman
- Genre: Historical fiction
- Published: 1998 Egmont UK Ltd
- Publication place: United Kingdom
- Media type: Print (HardbackPaperback)
- Pages: 161
- ISBN: 978-1405201940
- OCLC: 429021819

Kensuke's Kingdom is a children's novel by Michael Morpurgo, illustrated by Michael Foreman. Following a fictionalised version of Morpurgo as he is stranded on a desert island as a child, it was first published in 1999 by Egmont UK. It was subsequently released by various other publishers, such as Scholastic.

== Book summary ==
Through the frame story of Michael Morpurgo writing about his childhood, Kensuke's Kingdom tells the story of eleven-year-old Michael, whose family decides to sail around the world after his parents are made redundant from the local brickworks. The family set off with their dog, Stella Artois.

Initially their voyage goes well and Michael's family visit several exciting locations, including Brazil, South Africa and Australia, where they stay with Michael's distant uncle, Uncle John. After leaving Australia however, the weather becomes perilous, and their yacht is damaged. Michael's mum is also sick with severe stomach cramps. On one deceptively calm night, the family dog Stella Artois appears on deck, and given that she had previously fallen overboard in the Indian Ocean, Michael tries to retrieve her. A sudden wind takes hold of the yacht, and both Michael and Stella are washed overboard.

Alone and clinging to a football for buoyancy, Michael is convinced he will drown. Yet the next morning he finds himself on the shore of a peanut-shaped island with Stella, both alive and well. Questions as to how he came to be on the island are soon replaced by how they are to survive, and despite a thorough search of their new home, Michael and Stella are unable to find any food or fresh water. They are saved once again however, when they find that someone (or something) has left them water and food near the cave where they are sheltering. After failing to locate their mysterious benefactor, Michael decides to build a fire, in order to stay warm, keep mosquitoes away and potentially signal his whereabouts to passing ships. It is during this initial lighting of his fire that Michael finally meets the man who has been providing him food and water—Kensuke.

Their first meeting is not a happy one. Kensuke, despite not being able to speak much English, immediately sets out rules and boundaries. Michael may not light a fire, and must stay on his end of the island, which is the opposite end from Kensuke's own. Though he does later provide Michael with rush matting and a sheet to aid his sleep, Kensuke is cold and distant, leading to Michael growing resentful of his rules and routines, especially when Kensuke tells him not to swim in the sea following a tropical storm. After witnessing a ship pass by the island and trying in vain to shout to it, Michael defiantly decides that he will re-build his fire beacon, but in secret, behind some rocks on 'Watch Hill', a big mountain on his end. He eventually spots another ship and goes to light his beacon. Before it can catch on fire however, Kensuke appears, eyes full of hurt and rage, destroys it, and smashes the piece of fireglass Michael used to create the bonfire. Enraged, Michael charges into the sea, determined to let Kensuke know that he won't be bossed around, but is almost killed after being attacked by a jellyfish.

When Michael wakes up, he is in Kensuke's cave, and his 'captor', as Michael puts it, becomes his saviour as Kensuke nurses him back to health. Michael and Kensuke slowly become friends, with Michael teaching him to speak better English, and Kensuke showing Michael how he has survived on the island for so long, through a combination of fishing, collecting fruit and making rudimentary furniture for his cave. Michael also meets the orang-utans who appear to be Kensuke's friends and show a curious interest in him. As their friendship grows, Kensuke confides more and more in Michael, eventually telling him his life story: how he had a wife and son back home in Nagasaki, Japan, how he trained as a doctor, how he joined the Japanese navy as a medic in the Second World War and how his battleship was bombed, which led it to wreck on the island. Kensuke was also made aware by listening to American propaganda and soldiers that an atomic bomb had been dropped on Nagasaki, killing the entire populace. Kensuke believes his family are gone, and that his place is now on his island, Kensuke's Kingdom, with the orang-utans, and with Michael.

Despite feeling a familial bond with Kensuke, Michael yearns to see his own family. He writes a message in a Coke-bottle he had found earlier that day and tosses it out to sea, but it washes up on the beach and Kensuke discovers what he has done. After a period of stony silence, Kensuke acknowledges that Michael has another family off of the island and agrees to help him leave. Michael tries to encourage Kensuke to leave as well, pointing out that he doesn't know for sure if his wife (Kimi) and son (Michiya) were killed and telling him of what a modern and developed nation Japan has become. After being inspired by a night of watching baby turtles scamper out of their eggs and into the sea, Kensuke decides that he will be as brave as these turtles, going out on their own into the unknown, and leave the island.

Shortly afterwards however, a group of men that Kensuke brands 'killer men' arrive on the island, shooting the gibbons which live in the forest and stealing their babies. Kensuke and Michael rush to retrieve the orang-utans and find all but one, hiding them in their cave. Once the 'killer men' have departed, Kensuke and Michael fear the worst for their missing orang-utan, but are delighted when he comes bounding out of the forest, alive and well. As they wait for a ship to pass the island, Michael becomes concerned that Kensuke does not want to leave as he worries what will become of the orang-utans when he is gone. Eventually they spot a yacht and light a new fire beacon which they had built together. The yacht turns out to be the Peggy Sue—the very same yacht that Michael's family sailed on, approximately a year earlier. Overjoyed at the prospect of seeing his family again, Michael rushes to find Kensuke, who indeed reveals that he will not after so long leave his island, and makes Michael promise not to tell anyone about him for ten years (after which he will have died). Holding back tears, Michael promises, and is rescued by his parents.

In the epilogue (presented as having been added to the second edition of the novel), Michael publishes his story after ten years, as Kensuke asked him to do, titling it Kensuke's Kingdom, and receives a letter from Michiya, Kensuke's son, who reveals that he and his mother did indeed avoid the Nagasaki bombing, for they went to visit their grandparents during the bombing. Michael and Michiya meet, and Michael notes that Michiya laughs just like his father did.

== Adaptations ==
In August 2018, WildChild Productions took a theatrical adaptation of Kensuke's Kingdom by Stuart Paterson to Edinburgh Festival Fringe. It featured a voiceover by Jenny Agutter.

UK-based Lupus Films began production on an animated version of the story in 2020, and it debuted at the Annecy International Animation Film Festival on 11 June 2023, markedly simplifying details in the original story (by omission or telescoping) to accommodate the film's 77 minutes running time. The UK premiere was at the 67th BFI London Film Festival on 14 October 2023. The cast for the animated version include Sally Hawkins, Cillian Murphy and Ken Watanabe.
