= Big Gold Brick =

2022 black comedy film

- Official release poster
- Directed by: Brian Petsos
- Written by: Brian Petsos
- Produced by: Brian Petsos; Greg Lauritano; Jonathan Bronfman; Sergio Rizzuto; Danny Sawaf
- Starring: Emory Cohen; Andy Garcia; Megan Fox; Lucy Hale; Shiloh Fernandez; Frederick Schmidt; Oscar Isaac
- Cinematography: Daniel Katz
- Edited by: Bryan Gaynor
- Music by: Justin Hori
- Production companies: A Saboteur; JoBro Productions; Oceana Studios
- Distributed by: Samuel Goldwyn Films; Arclight Films
- Release date: February 25, 2022
- Running time: 132 minutes
- Country: United States
- Language: English

Big Gold Brick is a 2022 American black comedy film written and directed by Brian Petsos, in his directorial debut. It stars Emory Cohen, Andy Garcia, Megan Fox, Lucy Hale, Shiloh Fernandez, Frederick Schmidt, and Oscar Isaac. Principal photography began in May 2019 in Toronto, Canada. The film was released on February 25, 2022.

== Cast ==
- Emory Cohen as Samuel Liston
- Andy Garcia as Floyd Deveraux
- Megan Fox as Jacqueline Deveraux, Floyd's second wife and attorney
- Lucy Hale as Lily Deveraux, Floyd's daughter from his first marriage
- Oscar Isaac as Anselm
- Shiloh Fernandez as Roy
- Leonidas Castrounis as Edward Deveraux, Floyd's son
- Frederick Schmidt as Percy
- Tevin Wolfe as Lentil "Beans" Washington

== Release ==
In June 2021, Samuel Goldwyn Films acquired distribution rights to the film.

== Reception ==
On review aggregator Rotten Tomatoes, Big Gold Brick holds an approval rating of 21% based on 34 reviews, and an average rating of 3.40/10. The website's critics consensus reads: "Quirky to a fault, Big Gold Brick tries and fails to use visual tricks and a crowded narrative to hide its fundamental lack of purpose." On Metacritic, the film holds a weighted average score of 30 out of 100 based on 12 critics, indicating "generally unfavorable" reviews.
