= Waiting for Anya (film) =

2020 historical war drama film

- Theatrical release poster
- Directed by: Ben Cookson
- Written by: Toby Torlesse; Ben Cookson
- Based on: Waiting for Anya by Michael Morpurgo
- Produced by: Phin Glynn; Alan Latham; Victor Glynn
- Starring: Noah Schnapp; Thomas Kretschmann; Frederick Schmidt; Jean Reno; Anjelica Huston
- Cinematography: Gerry Vasbenter
- Edited by: Chris Gill
- Music by: James Seymour Brett
- Production companies: Goldfinch; Fourth Culture Films; Bad Penny Productions; 13 Films; Artémis Productions
- Distributed by: Vue Cinemas
- Release dates: 16 January 2020 (Miami Jewish Film Festival); 7 February 2020 (United States); 21 February 2020 (United Kingdom)
- Running time: 109 minutes
- Countries: United Kingdom; Belgium
- Languages: English; French; German
- Box office: $140,454

Waiting for Anya is a 2020 historical war drama film co-written and directed by Ben Cookson. It is a film adaptation of the 1990 novel of the same name by Michael Morpurgo.

The film stars Noah Schnapp, Thomas Kretschmann, Frederick Schmidt, Jean Reno, and Anjelica Huston. The film premiered at the 2020 Miami Jewish Film Festival and was released on 7 February 2020.

== Plot ==
The film begins in the summer of 1942, during World War II in the German occupation of France, a small village in the Pyrenees. A Jewish father named Benjamin walks his daughter, Anya, to the safety of a train fleeing France. One day, a young shepherd named Jo discovers several Jewish children hidden on a farm run by a widow, Horcada, and her son-in-law, the aforementioned Benjamin. Benjamin has lost track of Anya, but hopes to one day find her. During this time, helped by his mother-in-law, he helps the young Jews whom they protect to flee to Spain through the mountains. But this time, their mission is disrupted by the Germans who skirt the border, making it impossible to escape. Listening only to his courage, Jo decides to keep their secret and do everything to help them escape to Spain.

Supported by his grandfather, several inhabitants of the village and his father, a former prisoner of the Germans, Jo allies with Benjamin and the widow Horcada to allow the children to escape across the border. Although many children manage to escape to Spain one child becomes very sick and Benjamin takes her to the village where they are taken by the Germans. It transpires that one friendly German corporal (who lost his own daughter in a Berlin bombing) was aware of the children hiding but kept quiet about it, later telling Jo “at least we achieved something”.

One year after the war ends Anya eventually reaches the village and is welcomed by her grandmother and Jo.

== Cast ==
- Noah Schnapp as Jo
- Thomas Kretschmann as Nazi Corporal
- Frederick Schmidt as Benjamin
- Tómas Lemarquis as Lieutenant
- Elsa Zylberstein as Jo's mother
- Gilles Marini as Jo's father
- Jean Reno as Henri
- Anjelica Huston as Widow Horcada
- Nicholas Rowe as The Mayor
- Sadie Frost as Madame Jollet
- William Abadie as Father Lasalle
- Urs Rechn as Hans
- Joséphine de La Baume as Mademoiselle Audap
- Jean-François Balmer as Narrator
- Michael Morpurgo as Farmer
- Lukas Sauer (de) as Hans

== Release ==
The film premiered at the Miami Jewish Film Festival on 16 January 2020, and was theatrically released in the United States on 7 February 2020 by Vertical Entertainment and in the United Kingdom on 21 February 2020.

== Reception ==
=== Box office ===
Waiting for Anya grossed $0 in the United States and Canada, and a worldwide total of $139,504.

=== Critical response ===
On the review aggregator website Rotten Tomatoes, 43% of 28 critics' reviews are positive, with an average rating of 5/10. Metacritic, which uses a weighted average, assigned the film a score of 38 out of 100, based on five critics, indicating "generally unfavorable" reviews.
