= Pic d'Anie =

Mountain of the Pyrenees, France

Pic d'Anie Auñamendi
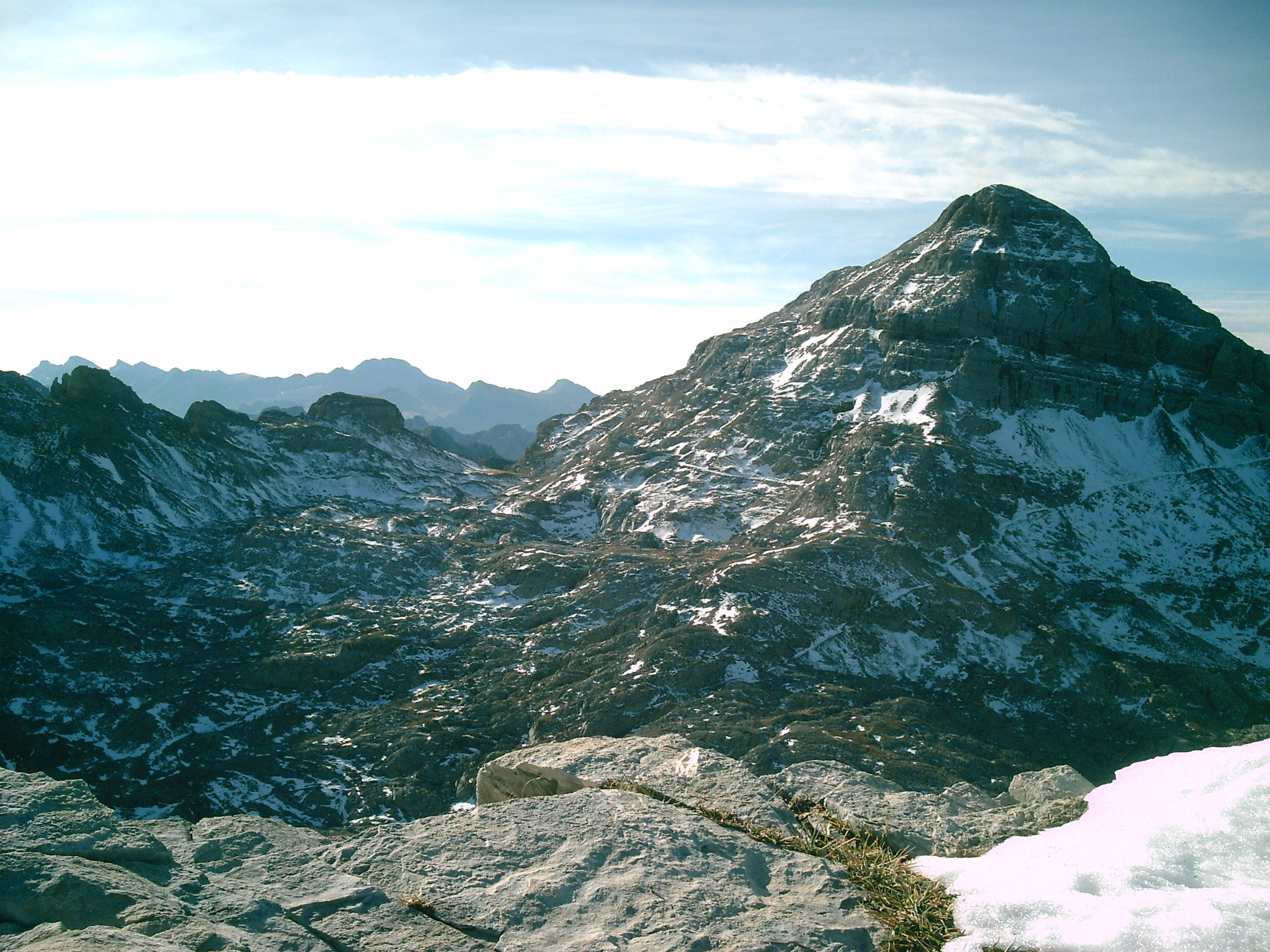
- Pic d'Anie

Highest point
- Elevation: 2,507 m (8,225 ft)
- Prominence: 844 m (2,769 ft)
- Coordinates: 42°56′42″N 00°43′16″W

Naming
- Language of name: French

Geography
- Location within Pyrenees
- Location: Pyrénées-Atlantiques, France
- Parent range: Pyrenees

Climbing
- Easiest route: Belagua, St Martin and Lescun

Pic d'Anie (Basque Auñamendi) is a mountain of the Pyrenees in France, located close to the Spanish border. It is 2,507 metres (8,225 ft) high.

The mountain has a pyramidal shape and is surrounded by the karst landscape of Larra, in the Larra-Belagua massif (Navarre).

The three main access routes to the peak are: Belagua in Spain and Pierre-Saint Martin and Lescun in the French department of Pyrénées-Atlantiques.
