= Kensuke's Kingdom (film) =

- Directed by: Neil Boyle; Kirk Hendry
- Screenplay by: Frank Cottrell-Boyce
- Based on: Kensuke's Kingdom by: Michael Morpurgo
- Produced by: Camilla Deakin; Ruth Fielding; Stephan Roellants
- Starring: Sally Hawkins; Cillian Murphy; Raffey Cassidy; Aaron MacGregor; Ken Watanabe
- Edited by: Richard Overall
- Music by: Stuart Hancock
- Production companies: Lupus Films; Luxembourg Film Fund; Ffilm Cymru Wales; Bumpybox; BFI; Align; Mélusine Productions; Jigsaw Films; Le Pacte
- Distributed by: Modern Films (United Kingdom); Le Pacte (France); Tarantula Distribution (Luxembourg)
- Release dates: 11 June 2023 (Annecy); 14 October 2023 (BFI London Film Festival); 7 February 2024 (France)
- Running time: 85 minutes
- Countries: United Kingdom; Luxembourg; France
- Language: English
- Budget: €10,945,388
- Box office: €2,964,000 (Note: Estimated on the basis of 411,596 tickets sold in France)

Kensuke's Kingdom is a 2023 animated adventure film based on the 1999 children's novel by Michael Morpurgo. The film debuted at the Annecy International Animation Film Festival on 11 June 2023. The UK premiere was at the 67th BFI London Film Festival on 14 October 2023. The general release in France was on 7 February 2024, under the title Le Royaume de Kensuké.

The film was nominated for the inaugural BAFTA Award for Best Children's & Family Film at the 78th British Academy Film Awards, though it lost to Wallace & Gromit: Vengeance Most Fowl.

== Premise ==
A boy and his dog Stella are swept overboard during a storm on a worldwide sailing trip with his family, he washes ashore on an island in the Pacific Ocean. There, he meets with a Japanese WWII straggler, Kensuke, from Nagasaki.

== Cast ==
- Aaron MacGregor as Michael Morpurgo
- Sally Hawkins as Mum
- Cillian Murphy as Dad
- Ken Watanabe as Kensuke
- Raffey Cassidy as Becky

== Production ==
It was announced in February 2019 that an animated film adaptation of the children's novel Kensuke's Kingdom by Michael Morpurgo was in development, with Sally Hawkins, Cillian Murphy, Ken Watanabe and Raffey Cassidy set as part of the voice cast, like the novel following a fictionalised version of Morpurgo himself as he is stranded on a desert island as a child.

In September 2020, the film entered production after securing new financing. Animation was provided primarily by the Cardiff-based firm Bumpybox.

== Reception ==
On the review aggregator website Rotten Tomatoes, 97% of 29 critics' reviews are positive, with an average rating of 7.3/10. The website's consensus reads: "Remaining loyal to its source material, Kensuke's Kingdom is a quietly engaging story with meticulous 2D animation that's more profound than average offerings". Metacritic, which uses a weighted average, assigned the film a score of 68 out of 100, based on 5 critics, indicating "generally favorable" reviews.
