= Church of St James, Iddesleigh =

St James' Church, Iddesleigh
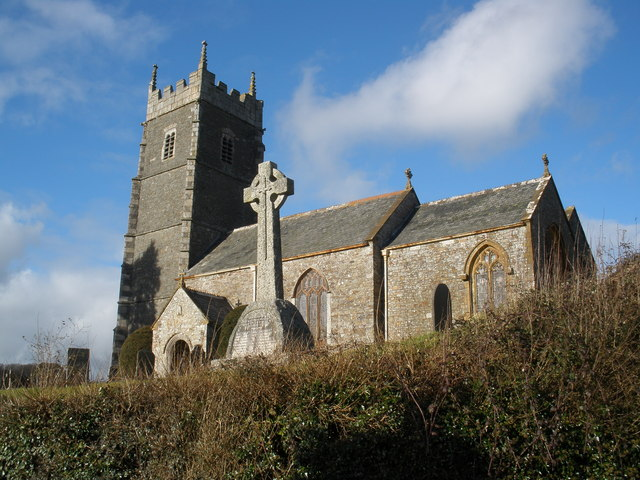
- St James' Church from the south

- Location in Devon
- 50.855810°N 4.034496°W
- OS grid reference: SS 56900 08226
- Location: Iddesleigh, Devon
- Country: England
- Denomination: Church of England

History
- Status: Operational
- Founded: 13th century

Architecture
- Heritage designation: Grade I listed building
- Designated: 22 February 1967
- Style: Gothic

Specifications
- Capacity: 120 seats

Administration
- Diocese: Exeter
- Parish: Iddesleigh

St James' Church, Iddesleigh, is a church in the small village of Iddesleigh, Devon, England. It dates back to the 13th century, although most of the structure dates from the 15th century, and there have been various changes since then.

== Location ==
Iddesleigh, known as leddeslegh before the Norman conquest of England (1066), is a village and parish in Devonshire. Samuel Lewis described the parish in 1848 as follows,

It is bounded on the west and south-west by the rivers Torridge and Okement; the banks of the former are richly ornamented with fine oaks, and the surrounding scenery is picturesque. The parish comprises 2522 acres, of which 380 are common or waste. The living is a rectory, valued in the king's books at £17. 1. 3.; net income, £350; patron, the Rev. Mr. Houndsfield: the glebe comprises 150 acres. The church is a small ancient edifice, partly in the early and partly in the decorated English style, with a handsome embattled tower, and contains a monumental effigy of a crusader, supposed to represent Sir J. Sully, whose family once possessed the manor. There is a place of worship for Bible Christians. The Rev. William Tasker, a poet and dramatist, was born here in 1740.

Iddesleigh today is a small village with a few thatched cottages and houses. From the church there are excellent views over Dartmoor, including Cawsand Beacon, Yes Tor and High Willhays.

== History ==
At one time the manor belonged to the De Sullys, one of whom was a famous crusader. Later it passed to Sir John Leger, and later to Sir Stafford Northcote, 1st Earl of Iddesleigh (1818–87). The parish church has its origins in the 13th century, but mostly dates to the 15th century. The parish registers start in 1541. 92 adult males in leddeslegh parish signed the Protestation Returns of 1641–1642, in which they swore an oath of allegiance to the Protestant religion. This indicates the population at that time.

The church was partially rebuilt in 1720. It was repaired and partially rebuilt in 1848. The vestry is an 1850 addition to the west end of the north aise. Memorial windows were added in 1866 to Hugh Malet, of Ash, and to Maria Louisa Prior: The church was thoroughly restored in 1879. Another memorial window was added by subscription to the 1st Earl of Iddesleigh, who died in 1887. A new organ was installed in 1897. The reredos and south chancel window were presented in 1912.

The church was designated a Grade I listed building on 22 February 1967.

== Building ==
The church of St. James is in the Gothic style. The walls are of coursed slate stone rubble with some granite ashlar in the buttresses of the tower. The roof is gable ended, covered in slate with decorative ridge tiles from the late 19th century. There is a four-stage tower with battlements at the western end with angle buttresses, with a crouching animal gargoyle on top of each buttress. The tower holds six bells. The first two are dated 1620 and the third is dated 1629. The tenor bell has an inscription in old English characters dedicating it to St. George. In 1911 two new bells were added to commemorate the coronation of King George V.

The church has a chancel, nave, aisles and south porch, and can seat 120 people. The interior is a tall granite arcade with three bays. It has piers with moulded cup capitals and 4-centred moulded arches. The nave and north aisle have excellent barrel vault ceilings. These are original, and have high relief moulding. There is a section of 15th century screen with perpendicular tracery in the north chapel, which was renovated in 1883. The semi-octagonal panelled pulpit is early 17th century, with an integral carved lectern. The font is octagonal, of granite with carved panels and a moulded shaft, and may date to 1538. The north wall of the chancel holds a slate memorial dated 1681 to Wilmot Veale, wife of the rector. The inscription is in gothic script, and the memorial has a high relief carved figure of a woman and child.

The church holds a fairly well-preserved effigy of a military figure almost 6 feet (1.8 m) long from about 1250. It is held under a low arch in the north wall of the north aisle, behind the organ. The figure is recumbent, with crossed legs. The head is on a rectangular pillow and the feet rest on a lion. The figure is dressed in mail under a surcoat which falls open at the front. The knight wore a sword and a shield with no heraldry. Possibly the effigy represents an ancestor of Sir John Sully, a crusader who owned property at Iddesleigh, where he died in 1387 at the age of 105.

== Organisation ==
St James, Iddesleigh is in the parish of Iddesleigh in the Diocese of Exeter of the Church of England. The church seems to have originally been named after Saint James the Less, but later was seen as named after James the Great. None of the six stores in the church were dedicated to James. In 1740 the parish feast was reported as being held on Whit Tuesday, but around 1755 it was reported on Whit Sunday. The Friends Of St James, Iddesleigh, is a registered charity that supports the St James parochial council in fundraising and in maintaining the church. It makes grants to organisations for conserving the environment and heritage, and for activities related to religion, art, culture, heritage and science.

== Sources ==
- Bromilow, John K. (June 2014), A military effigy St James's Church, Iddesleigh, Devon, Church Monument Society
- Church of St James, Iddesleigh, BLB: British Listed Buildings
- Cresswell, Beatrix (1906), "Notes on Devon Churches - Deanery Churches in the Deanery of Torrington", Kelly's Directory – via British Listed Buildings
- "Friends of St James, Iddesleigh", Total Giving, Raise Your Profile Ltd.
- Haigh, Lesley (2009), Villages of Dolton, Dowland, Iddesleigh And Roborough
- Iddesleigh, Devon County Council, archived from the original on 2 March 2013
- "Iddesleigh, Devon", UKGA: UK Genealogy Archives
- Lewis, Samuel (1848), A Topographical Dictionary of England (7 ed.) – via UKGA
- Orme, Nicholas (1996), English Church Dedications: With a Survey of Cornwall and Devon, University of Exeter Press, ISBN 978-0-85989-516-3
- Protestation Returns, Parliament UK
- "St James, Iddesleigh", A Church Near You, Archbishops' Council
