= The Wreck of the Zanzibar =

1995 children's novel by Michael Morpurgo

- First edition
- Author: Michael Morpurgo
- Illustrator: Francois Place
- Language: English
- Genre: Children's novel
- Publisher: William Heinemann
- Publication date: 1995
- Publication place: United Kingdom
- Media type: Print
- Pages: 124
- ISBN: 978-1-4052-3336-1
- OCLC: 137221891

The Wreck Of The Zanzibar is a children's novel written by Michael Morpurgo. It was first published in Great Britain by William Heinemann Publishers in 1995. The book won the Whitbread Children's Book Award in 1995, it was shortlisted for a Carnegie Medal, and won the Children's Book Award for Long Novel in 1996.

== Plot summary ==
The story unfolds in journal entries and watercolor illustrations made by 14-year-old Laura Perryman in 1907 and 1908. She tells of her life on Bryher, one of Britain's Scilly Isles, where her family's survival depends on the mercy of the elements and the sea. One winter is particularly harsh, with the family's cows sickening and dying, the weather destroying houses and boats, the food stores dwindling and Laura's twin brother, Billy, running away to join a ship's crew. As bleak as Laura's days are, she is gentle enough to protect a sea turtle which might otherwise serve as food, and hopeful enough to dream of rowing in the island gig despite repeated declarations that a girl will never be allowed to handle one of the oars. Laura gets her chance in a dramatic storm and shipwreck, and helps save the island.

== Release ==
The book was originally published in the United Kingdom in 1995 by William Heinemann. The book won the Whitbread Children's Book Award in 1995; it was shortlisted for a Carnegie Medal, and won the Children's Book Award for Long Novel in 1996.

== Reviews ==
Elizabeth Watson wrote in The Horn Book Magazine that it is a "beautifully executed tale enhanced by delicate watercolor sketches, and the slight volume makes a solid impact on the reader, who will finish the book with a satisfied smile". Joanne Kelleher of the School Library Journal said the "action in this short novel builds slowly toward the final chapter, and bright watercolor illustrations scattered throughout do much to enliven the text, but in all, a story that's well written but that has limited appeal".

In her review for Booklist, Carolyn Phelan said that "throughout the book, Francois Place's small watercolor paintings reflect the innocence, pain, and grace of the story; the illustrated diary format has its appeal, giving immediacy to a setting removed in time and place, but the story's main strength lies in the telling". Publishers Weekly said the novel "spins a tale as compelling as it is unusual in its setting and plot; it is a hearty, old-fashioned survival tale that should appeal equally to both sexes". Joanna Carey from The Guardian opined that "a tiny island in the Scillies makes a perfect theatre for a dramatic tale, and gentle, atmospheric drawings provide a wealth of period detail".
