= Frederick Schmidt =

British film and television actor

- Born: 3 August 1984 (age 41); London, England
- Occupation: Actor
- Years active: 2010–present

Frederick Schmidt (born 3 August 1984) is a British actor who has appeared in such films as Mission: Impossible – Fallout (2018) and Angel Has Fallen (2019).

== Career ==
In his early career, he starred in many British films. In Mission: Impossible – Fallout (2018), he appears alongside Tom Cruise. In Angel Has Fallen (2019), he plays Wade Jennings's assistant. He also stars in the TV series Supergirl, in which he plays Metallo.

== Filmography ==
Key
†	Denotes works that have not yet been released

=== Film ===
Year	Title	Role	Notes
2013	Starred Up	Officer Gentry	
2014	Snow In Paradise	Dave	
2014	Second Coming	Jason	
2016	Alleycats	Sid	
2016	Brimstone	Sheriff Zeke	
2016	Kaleidoscope	Wesley	
2017	The Marker	Marley Dean Jacobs	
2018	Mission: Impossible – Fallout	Zola Mitsopolis	
2018	Patient Zero	Joe Cocker	
2019	Angel Has Fallen	Travis Cole	
2020	Waiting for Anya	Benjamin	
2022	Big Gold Brick	Percy	
2022	The Hanging Sun	Michael	
2023	Mission: Impossible – Dead Reckoning Part One	Zola Mitsopolis	
2024	The Partisan	Roger	

=== Television ===
Year	Title	Role	Notes
2016–17	Supergirl	John Corben / Metallo	Season 2, 3 episodes
2017	Taboo	Pursuer	Season 1, episode 5
2017	The Flash	Metallo-X	Voice, Season 4, episode: "Crisis on Earth-X, Part 3"
2020	The Alienist	Goo Goo Knox	Season 2
