= Seán Rafferty =

Scottish poet (1909-1993)

- Born: John Dickson Kerr Rafferty; 6 February 1909; Dumfriesshire, Scotland
- Died: 4 December 1993 (aged 83); Iddesleigh, Devon, England
- Education: University of Edinburgh
- Occupation: Poet

Seán Rafferty (born John Dickson Kerr Rafferty; 6 February 1909, in Dumfriesshire, Scotland – 4 December 1993, in Iddesleigh, Devon, England) was a Scottish poet, based in England from 1932 until his death.

== Career ==
Rafferty studied Classics at the University of Edinburgh before moving to England in 1948.

Rafferty's poetic work is squarely within the Anglo-American modernist tradition, reflecting variously the influence of traditional English lyric, Celtic bardic poetry, balladry, and popular song.

Rafferty's poetry has been praised by Sorley MacLean, Ted Hughes, Michael Morpurgo and Hugh MacDiarmid and was posthumously published in collections by the poetry presses Carcanet and Etruscan.

== Personal life ==
The death of Rafferty's first wife, Betty Bryant, in 1945, by whom he had a daughter, figures prominently in his poetry. He married Peggy Laing in 1947 and the next year moved with her to Iddesleigh, Devon, where he was landlord of the Duke Of York Inn. He lived in Iddesleigh until his death in 1993, at the age of 84.

== Works ==
=== Books ===
- Collected Poems, edited by Nicholas Johnson, Manchester: Carcanet, 1995.
- Poems, edited by Nicholas Johnson, Buckfastleigh, South Devonshire : Etruscan Books; Berkeley, CA : Distributed in America by SPD, 1999. [Revised and enlarged version of the 1995 Carcanet edition.]
- Poems, Revue Sketches, and Fragments, edited by Nicholas Johnson, Buckfastleigh, South Devonshire : Etruscan Books; Berkeley, CA : Distributed in America by SPD, 2004.

=== Recordings ===
- Various Artists - In Tune with the World: The Poetry of Seán Rafferty (2010 Brown Label Poetry), featuring readings by Jim Causley, Michael and Clare Morpurgo, Carol Hughes, Nicholas Johnson, Jane Fever and Vic Baines.
