= Flamingo Boy =

2018 British children's novel

- First edition cover
- Author: Michael Morpurgo
- Language: English
- Genre: Children's novel
- Publisher: HarperCollins
- Publication date: 8 March 2018
- Publication place: United Kingdom
- Media type: Print
- Pages: 288
- ISBN: 978-0-00-813464-8 Hardback

Flamingo Boy, also known as The Day the World Stopped Turning, is a British children's novel written by Michael Morpurgo. The book was first published in the United Kingdom as Flamingo Boy by HarperCollins in 2018. The book was inspired in part by Morpurgo's grandson, who is autistic.

== Plot ==
Flamingo Boy is set during World War II, in Camargue in southern France. It is centred on an autistic boy named Lorenzo, who is growing up on a farm in that region when the Germans invade the country and occupy France. The story begins in contemporary France though, where a teen-aged boy named Vincent, is being rehabilitated in the home of a Camargue woman, who enjoys telling the youngster stories about the war. She goes into detail how there were flamingos who fled the region, and Lorenzo, an autistic teenager, who gave her comfort and refuge when the Nazis invaded the town.

== Background ==
It's the people who don't fit in who change the world.

— Michael Morpurgo

Morpurgo said he was inspired to write the book based on two distinct experiences in his life. The first one being his autistic fifteen-year-old grandson. He said getting to know and understand his grandson has "been an eye-opener". Morpurgo says that "for years and years, children like this were put away, hidden from sight, yet they cast a great light into other people's lives because there is something elemental about them, and the child that is in each of us is very visible in an autistic child". Morpurgo also points out that he discussed it beforehand with his family, since they were "real people involved in the story". He says they were on board for him discussing his grandson in the novel, and were pleased he was going to "create more awareness among people, who have no real connection to the subject matter until it has an impact on their own life".

The second experience involved him going on holiday in Camargue. Morpurgo said he recalls thinking how isolated the place was, and that "autistic children can't really go out in the world alone". He visited a national park in the area where there were pink flamingos, and it "gave me the story of an autistic boy growing up in a farmhouse amongst these creatures". He also decided to set the story during World War II, when France was occupied by Germany. He noted that during this time-frame, people "who were different", were constantly under threat for being locked up and horribly mistreated by the Nazi regime. Morpurgo goes on to say about the two experiences, "it's not deliberately weaving, it's things that I come across that seem to work together".

== Reviews ==
Jennifer Hillman from the School Librarian wrote that "throughout the book, the vivid and dramatic events surrounding these characters and the prejudices their families face, is delicately and sensitively handled". She says it is not only "a story of intolerance, but it is also an inspiring tale of friendship and courage which children will undoubtedly adore". Nicolette Jones wrote in The Sunday Times that "not every phrase is finely turned, but the storytelling is, as always, irresistible and the characters clasp your heart. Don't forget, this is Michael Morpurgo: you will need a handkerchief for the happy ending".

In her review for The Bulletin of the Center for Children's Books, Natalie Berglind said "this quiet, introspective story is pulled along by the magnetic voices of Vincent and Kezia, who easily draw readers into the past". She also notes how Morpurgo "touches upon the common debate about the intentions of individual Nazis through the nuanced portrayal of a German officer who displays frequent kindness and the family's measured reaction – they may not all be wicked, but they do wicked things". She sums up her review by stating, "Lorenzo is sensitively portrayed, and he has great depth of character in spite of his limited speech, and overall, readers will learn much about history, culture, friendship, and morality with an unambiguously happy ending that is worth a read".

Kids Book Review opined that the novel is "filled with compassion and love, and this perfectly crafted story is full of humanity and hope. It's about family and what defines it, friendship and fate, and how people who are outcasts – people with uncommon minds, are the ones that make a difference to the common person's life".

== See also ==
- Autism in France
