= Iddesleigh =

Village in Devon, England

Coordinates: 50.85°N 04.04°W

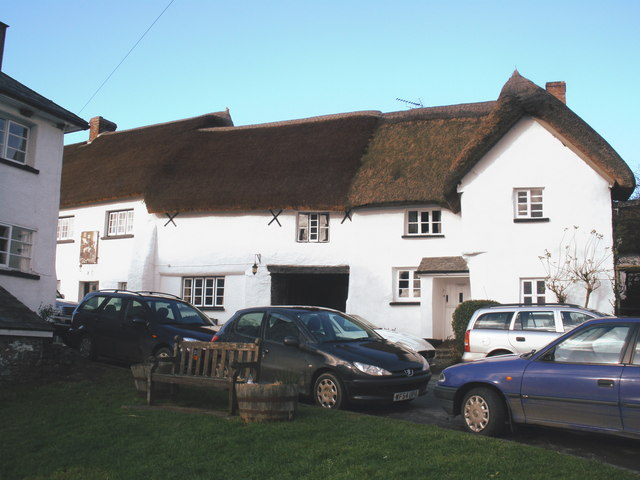
- Cob and thatch cottages in the village

- Location within Devon
- Population: 198
- OS grid reference: SS5608
- Shire county: Devon
- Region: South West
- Country: England
- Sovereign state: United Kingdom
- Post town: Winkleigh
- Postcode district: EX19
- Police: Devon and Cornwall
- Fire: Devon and Somerset
- Ambulance: South Western

Iddesleigh (/ˈɪdzliː/ IDZ-lee) is a village and civil parish in the county of Devon, England. The settlement has ancient origins and is listed in the Domesday Book. The village lies on the B3217 road, roughly central in its parish of around 2,900 acres (1,200 ha), about 8 miles (13 km) north of the town of Okehampton.

Iddesleigh has been described as an attractive small village, with good views of Dartmoor to the south. Its church is a Grade I listed building and there are a number of other listed buildings in the parish.

== Toponymy and early history ==
The name Iddesleigh derives from the Old English personal name, Ēadwīġ (or perhaps Ēadwulf), and lēah, a wood or clearing. The first documentary evidence of the settlement appears in the Domesday Book (1086), where it is referred to twice, as Edeslege and as Iweslei. By the 13th century its name was recorded as Edulvesly and in 1428 as Yeddeslegh.

Domesday Book shows that in 1086 the majority of the manor of Iddesleigh (under the name of Edeslege) was owned directly by the king, but a small part of it (one virgate recorded as Iweslei) was held from the king by William of Claville. The pre-conquest owner of this land is unclear: two women's names – Alware Pet and Aelfeva Thief – are recorded. The overlord is recorded as Brictric son of Algar. By the 13th century the lands had passed to the de Reigny family as part of the honour of Gloucester.

== Geography ==
The village is three miles (5 km) north-east of Hatherleigh and eight miles (13 km) north of Okehampton. It is roughly in the centre of its parish, on the B3217 road that runs from Okehampton to Atherington, near the A377.

The parish, which covers about 2,900 acres (1,200 ha) on the Culm Measures, has its southern border along the River Okement and its western along the River Torridge. Clockwise from the north, it is bordered by the parishes of Dowland, Winkleigh, Broadwoodkelly, Monkokehampton, Hatherleigh and Meeth.

In 2001, the population of the parish was 198, down from 335 in 1901, and 441 in 1801.

== The village ==
The landscape historian W. G. Hoskins, writing in 1953, described the village as "an excellent example of a cob and thatch village, most attractive to explore", and in 1973 S. H. Burton wrote that it gave the appearance of being "thatchier" than anywhere else in Devon. Situated on a south-facing slope, the village has good views of northern Dartmoor, including its highest point, High Willhays.

The Church of St James, the parish church, is at the western edge of the village, and is a Grade I listed building. With 13th-century origins, but mostly dating from the 15th century, it has wagon roofs in its nave and north aisle. A recumbent effigy of a knight with a plain shield, lying under an arch has been dated to c. 1250 and is believed to be of a squire of Iddesleigh, a member of the locally-notable Sully family. The church was partly rebuilt in 1720 with further work in the early 19th century, followed by restoration by Charles S. Adye in 1878–9.

The listed village pub, the "Duke of York", is made of cob and thatch, and is slightly hidden from the main road being along a side street behind some terraced cottages. Its facade was used in the BBC television series Down to Earth, broadcast in 2000. It was in this pub that Michael Morpurgo says he talked to an old soldier with first-hand knowledge of the use of horses in the First World War which became the basis for his 1982 novel War Horse. The village was also used as inspiration for the Morpurgo novel, Private Peaceful. In July 2021, the Prince of Wales visited the pub, meeting Michael and Clare Morpurgo.

== Landmarks ==
Ash House, a Grade II listed building in the south of the parish, was the seat of the Mallet family from 1530 to 1881. It was later bought by the founders of the Rare Breeds Survival Trust.

There has been a settlement at Barwick, in the south-east corner of the parish, since at least the early 15th century: a document dated 1440 refers to it as Berewyke. There are two listed buildings here. Little Barwick is a late 15th-century building with 17th-century and later alterations—its most notable feature is its medieval full cruck trusses, unusual in Devon. South Barwick Farmhouse dates from the first part of the 17th century. Barwick had a stud farm breeding shire horses before World War I. The "Barwick Madam" was noted in the local shire horse stud book.

The Tarka Trail, a series of footpaths and cycle routes radiating from Barnstaple, passes from north to south through the parish, taking in the village.

== Notable people ==
The Reverend Jack Russell, originator of the eponymous dog breed, was curate at Iddesleigh between 1830 and 1836. In 1885, when Sir Stafford Northcote was raised to the peerage, he took the title of Earl of Iddesleigh, which was, according to W. G. Hoskins, a curious choice since his main estates were not here. He did, however, own some 2,000 acres (800 ha) of the parish.

The Scottish-born poet, Seán Rafferty lived in the parish from 1948 until his death in December 1993; he was landlord of the Duke of York pub until 1975. Rafferty was a friend of author Michael Morpurgo, who has lived in Iddesleigh since the 1970s. In 1976 Morpurgo and his wife, Clare, set up the Farms for City Children charity which is based at Nethercott House in the parish. Poet Ted Hughes, who lived nearby, was a close friend and regular visitor to the Morpurgos and became the first president of the charity.
