= Mesa de los Tres Reyes =

Mountain in the Pyrenees

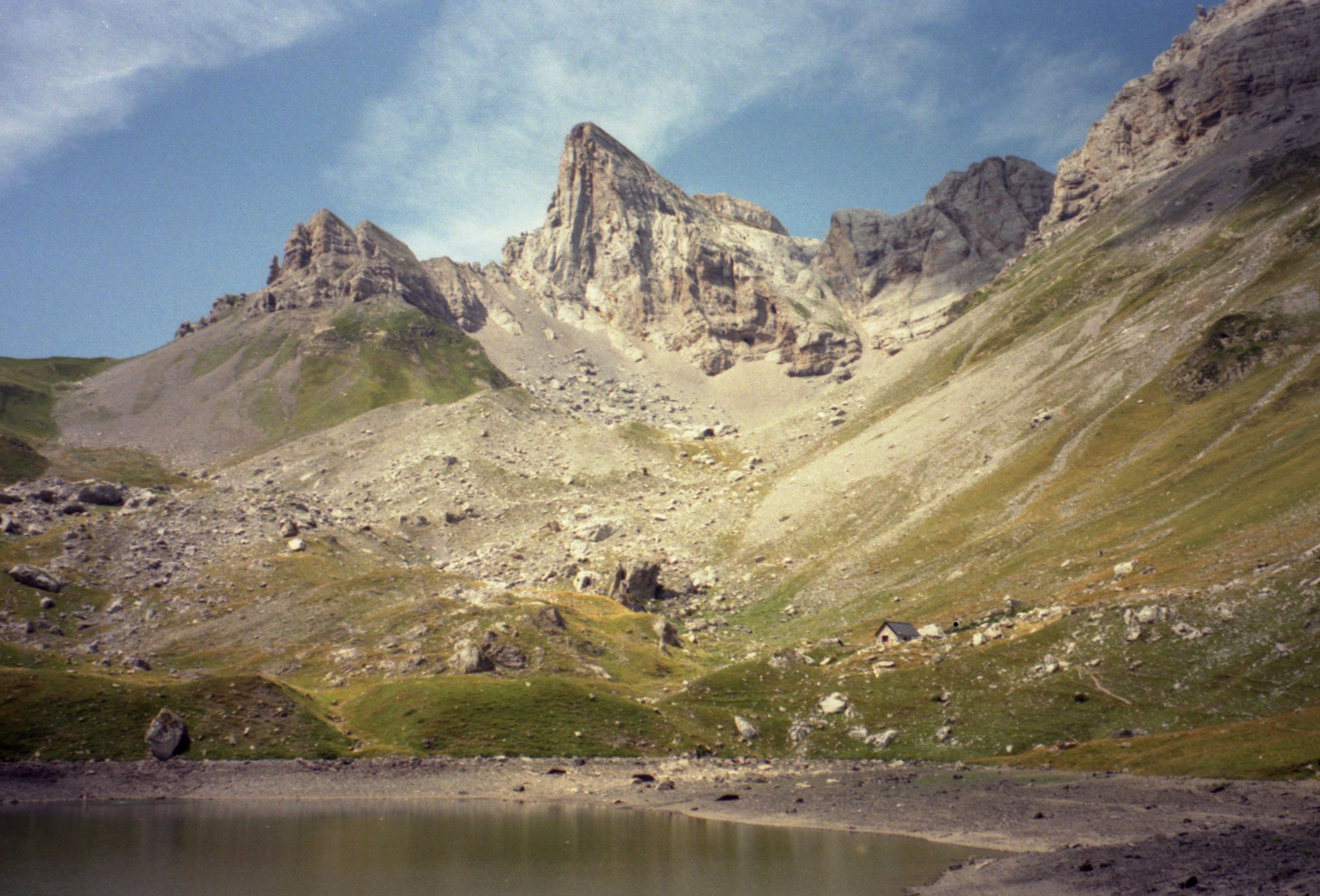
- Mesa de los Tres Reyes viewed from Lac de Lhurs.

Highest point
- Elevation: 2,446 m (8,025 ft)
- Prominence: 392 m (1,286 ft)
- Coordinates: 42°56′42″N 0°43′20″W

Naming
- English translation: Table of the Three Kings
- Language of name: Spanish

Geography
- Location within Spain
- Location: Aragon/Navarre, Spain; France
- Parent range: Pyrenees

Mesa de los Tres Reyes (Basque: Hiru Erregeen Mahaia, Roncalese Basque: Iror Errege Maia, Aragonese: Meseta d'os Tres Reis, Gascon: Tabla d'eths Tros Rouyes, French: Table des Trois Rois) is a mountain of the Pyrenees. It is the highest point of Spanish Navarre, with an elevation of 2,446 metres (8,025 ft).

Its name, "The Table of the Three Kings", derives from the fact that the mountain is located at the confluence of the ancient kingdoms of Navarre, Aragon, and Béarn.

== See also ==
- Pyrenees
- Tossal dels Tres Reis
