= Little Foxes =

British 1984 children's novel

- First edition cover
- Author: Michael Morpurgo
- Illustrator: Gareth Floyd
- Language: English
- Genre: Children's novel
- Publisher: Kaye & Ward
- Publication date: 1984
- Publication place: United Kingdom
- Media type: Print
- Pages: 200
- ISBN: 0-7182-3972-5
- OCLC: 1302140550

Little Foxes is a children's novel written by Michael Morpurgo in 1984. It is illustrated by Gareth Floyd and was first published in the United Kingdom by Kaye & Ward.

== Plot ==
Billy Bunch is an orphan who has had many foster families which never worked out. He is currently living with a foster mother in the suburbs of a city. They don't get on well. At school Billy is not good at subjects, especially English (he cannot read out loud because he stutters). One night, while Billy tries to run away, he runs into the nearby abandoned land where there are the ruins of a monastery. There is plentiful wildlife living in this place that others call "The Waste Ground". Billy calls it his "Wilderness." Billy connects with the nature and wildlife there, rescuing an injured swan and nurturing some fox cubs, finding solace in the process.

Aided by the comfort he finds in his new animal friends in his Wilderness, Billy is able to outgrow his stutter. He remains in his foster home and continues to visit his friends in Wilderness for a while. This does not last long before others in his neighborhood begin to view the area as a danger and the wildlife within it as a threat. Events take some unfortunate turns, and eventually Billy runs away with one of the young foxes. The two of them have several adventures and develop a strong bond. On one of these adventures, he meets a man who has a boat and cares for all the birds around the river. The man says that Billy can stay with him on his boat as they are going in the same direction. For the first time in his life, Billy has somebody who allows him to be himself while also helping him understand some hard truths about life. The journey down the river on the boat begins a journey into young adulthood for both Billy and his beloved fox.

== Reviews ==
Patricia Manning wrote in the School Library Journal that the book "is overwritten in spots and has other weaknesses to boot, as it stands this plot is too contrived to be convincing". In their review of the audiobook, AudioFile Magazine said Bill Wallis's "calm, elegant reading is perfect to tell the story of foster child Billy Bunch ... Wallis's soothing voice tracks Billy's attachment to a fox, which sends him fleeing from his unhappy living situation. His gentle tones follow Billy's path until he finds a place where he belongs – with people who need him as much as he needs a loving home". The Week Junior said the novel is "a heartfelt animal adventure". British children's author Ali Sparkes said she had met Michael Morpurgo and told him he always makes me cry ... this story is no exception ... very beautifully told and never sentimental".
