= Private Peaceful =

2003 book by Michael Morpurgo

- Cover of first edition
- Author: Michael Morpurgo
- Language: English
- Genre: War novel, young adult novel
- Published: 2003
- Publisher: HarperCollins
- Publication place: United Kingdom
- Pages: 185
- ISBN: 978-0-00-715006-9
- OCLC: 534265686765

Private Peaceful is a young adult novel by British author Michael Morpurgo first published in 2003. It is about a fictional young soldier called Thomas "Tommo" Peaceful, who is looking back on his life so far and his going to war. The story focuses on the harsh realities of English rural life and warfare, and highlights the British Army's practice of executing its own soldiers during the First World War. Morpurgo was inspired to write the novel after learning about the around 300 British and Commonwealth soldiers who were shot for crimes like desertion and cowardice. The novel helped further the campaign to grant posthumous pardons to the men, which were agreed and implemented by the UK Government in 2006.

Private Peaceful won the 2004 Red House Children's Book Award and the 2005 Blue Peter Book Award. It has been adapted by Simon Reade into a stage play, a radio play and a film. The folk trio Coope Boyes and Simpson performed in a concert which featured folk songs and readings from the novel; a live recording called Private Peaceful: The Concert was released in 2006.

== Plot ==
The story is told from the perspective of the fictional character Thomas "Tommo" Peaceful, a young man from a rural village in England who fights in the First World War. The novel switches between Tommo's past and present: in a short section at the beginning of every chapter, Tommo describes his thoughts and feelings during a single night in a hay barn near the Somme. Each chapter indicates the progress of time, with titles such as "Five Past Ten" and "Twenty To Eleven", gradually counting down to the morning of his brother Charlie's execution by firing squad. The majority of the novel covers Tommo's memories of his life.

Tommo is revealed to live with his older brothers, "Big" Joe and Charlie.

He recalls his boyhood before the First World War. He discusses his love for Molly, a girl he met on his first day at school, and his relationship with his older brother Charlie. Early in the story, Tommo and his father go woodcutting together, leading to his father's death while he saves Tommo from a falling tree; Tommo keeps the incident a secret from everyone, blaming himself for what happened. Tommo, Charlie and Molly grow up together; their mischievous adventures include braving their nasty great-aunt, defying a Colonel, skinny-dipping, and being the first people in their village to see an aeroplane.

Charlie, Molly and later Tommo all find jobs on the local estate or in the village. Charlie and Molly become closer as they are both older than Tommo, causing Tommo to feel left out. Later, it is revealed that Molly had become pregnant with Charlie's baby. She is thrown out of her own house by her disapproving parents and moves in with the Peacefuls. Tommo is heartbroken after the couple rush to get married. A short time later, Charlie is asked to enlist in the British Army and is deployed to France to fight in the First World War. Tommo lies about his age in order to join his brother. The rest of the story describes the brothers' experiences of the war: their confrontations with Sergeant "Horrible" Hanley, near-misses during the fighting on the front line, and Charlie's continued protection of Tommo.

During a charge of the German lines, Charlie disobeys a direct order from Sergeant Hanley and stays with Tommo while he is injured in no-man's-land. As a result, Charlie is accused of cowardice, for which he is court-martialled and sentenced to death. On the night before his brother's execution, Tommo reveals to Charlie his guilt for their father's death; Charlie reassures him that his father's death was not his fault. Tommo learns that Sergeant Hanley has been killed, but this only provides small consolation. Charlie is marched before the firing squad and dies happily, singing his favourite childhood song, "Oranges and Lemons". The novel ends with Tommo preparing for the Battle of the Somme.

== Themes ==
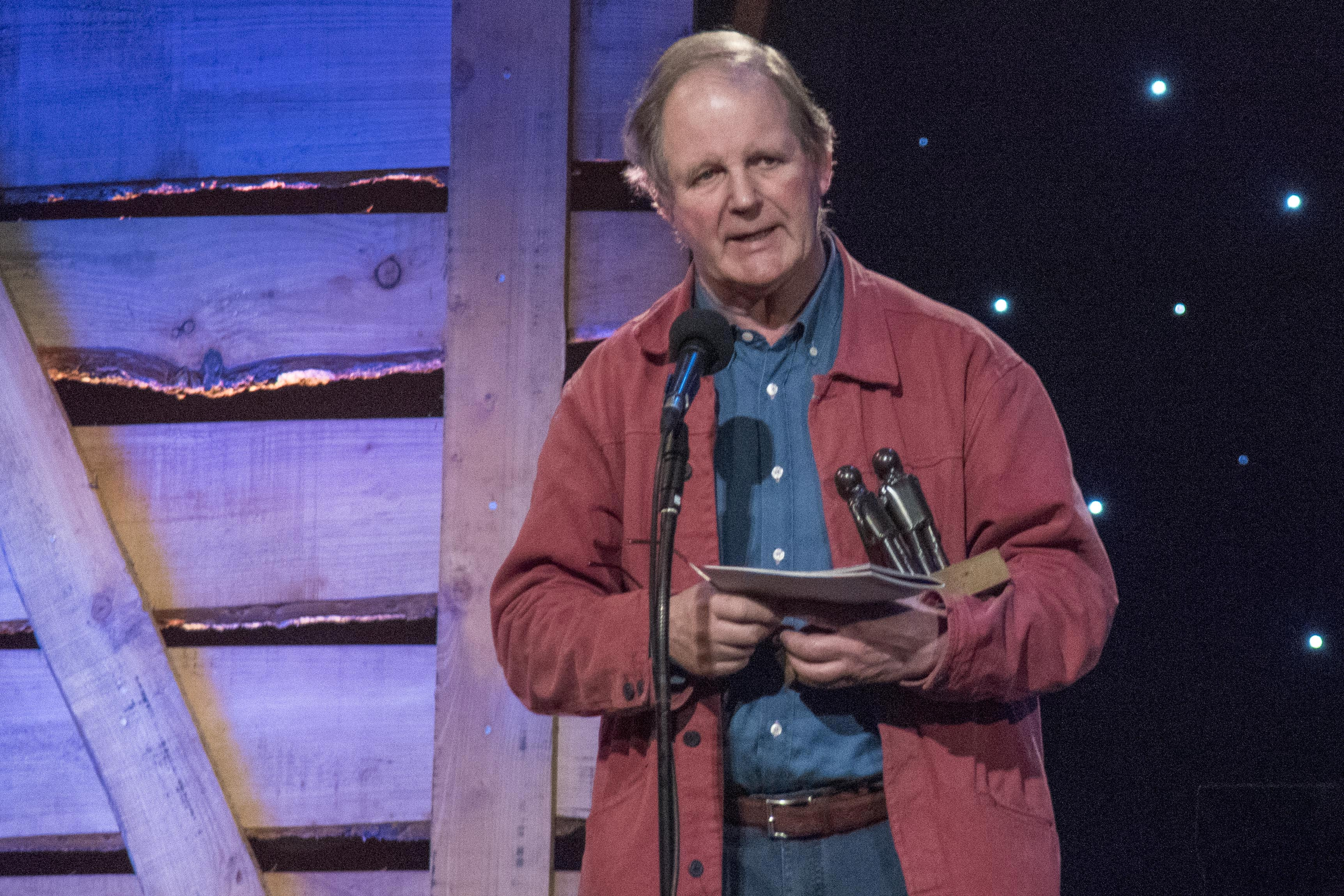
Michael Morpurgo has said that his novels, including Private Peaceful, do not glorify war.

Morpurgo has written multiple books for children about war. The author has been praised for the anti-war messages of his stories, and although Morpurgo has said that none of his books—including Private Peaceful—glorify war, he believes that children must make their own minds up about what the story tells them. Compared to other twenty-first-century children's novels about war, which often focus on families and civilians' perspectives, Private Peaceful is about how soldiers were also victims of the time. The story begins with the Peaceful brothers experiencing the unfairness of the early twentieth-century UK class system amongst the backdrop of their rural village, before experiencing the unfairness of warfare itself. Through Tommo's narrative, Morpurgo demonstrates that a soldier can be a whole, complex person with their own motives. The two brothers have conflicting views about fighting in the war. Charlie expresses confusion as to why he should be forced to fight the Germans, saying "Why should I ever want to shoot a German? Never even met a German." Tommo is more willing to fight due to his fear of being called a coward.

Brotherhood and kindness are themes throughout the novel. Tommo looks up to Charlie, who has many positive traits similar to an archetypical soldier or hero. Morpurgo has acknowledged the weight of Charlie's sacrifice at the end of the novel, saying "I understand his love for his brother and how he would do anything for him, but I'm not sure that when the time came, I would be able to do what he does".

== Inspiration ==
=== Plot ===
Morpurgo was inspired to write a novel about soldiers who were court-martialled and shot during the First World War after learning about the practice whilst at a conference in Ypres. Soldiers accused of crimes like desertion and cowardice had trials which sometimes only lasted 20 minutes, and many of those who were executed were suffering from shell shock. After facing calls to review the executions, in 1998 the Ministry of Defence denied there was a need to grant posthumous pardons to the approximately 300 men who had been killed. The UK Government did acknowledge that the executions were wrong, but continued to refuse pardons due to the complexities of reviewing the historic cases. Morpurgo said he was "outraged" at the government's position.

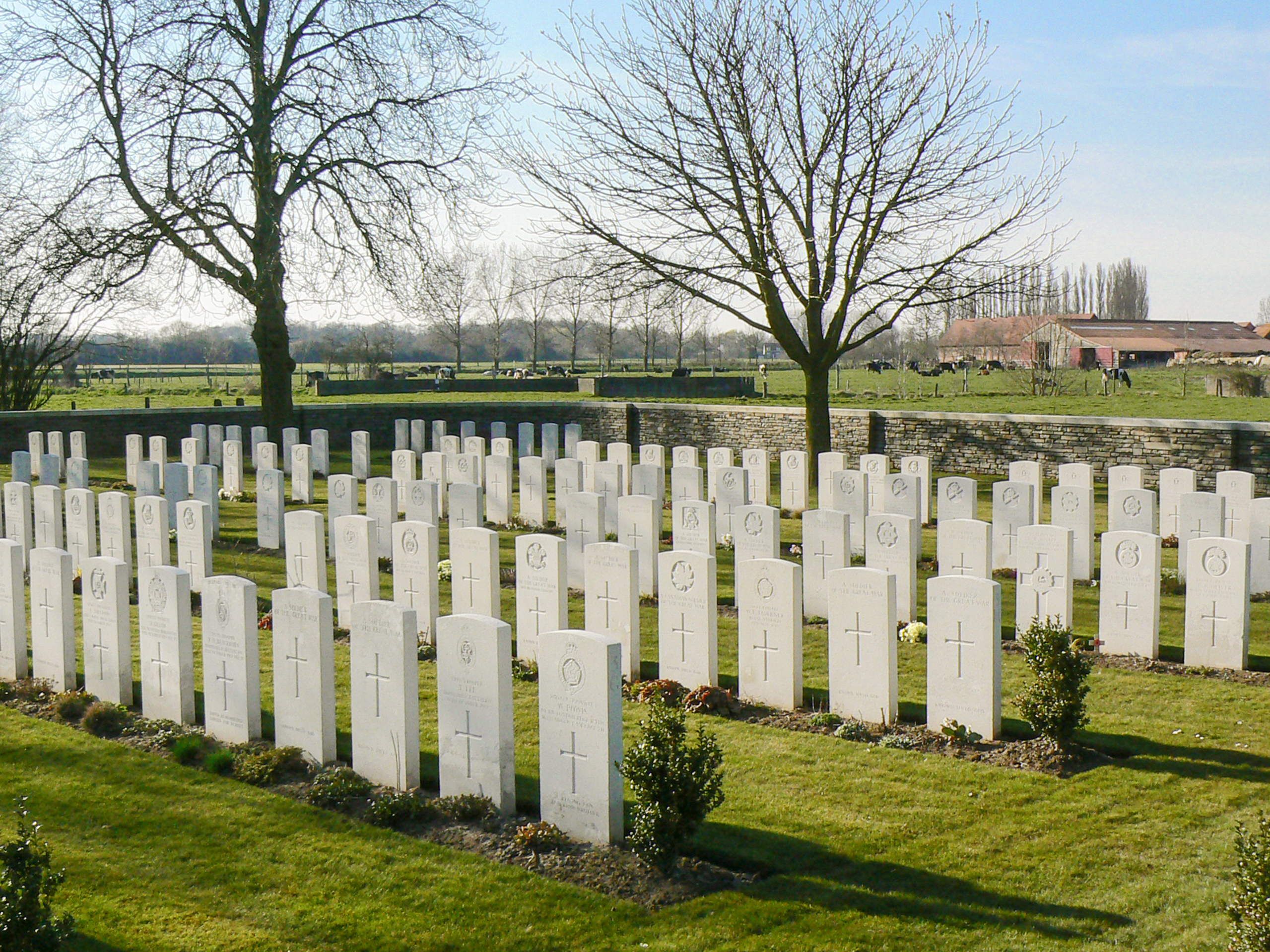
Morpurgo was inspired to use the name "Peaceful" for his main characters after seeing the name on a gravestone in Bedford House Cemetery.

Morpurgo has said that inspiration for the plot of Private Peaceful came from the story of Sergeant John Thomas Wall, who was executed for desertion on 6 September 1917. Wall had been a successful sergeant during the war and had no other convictions to his name. During an enemy artillery barrage on 10 August 1917, Wall was sheltering in a dugout with two privates and refused to leave them behind, knowing that attempting to re-join the front line would have led to certain death. The men were forced to remain in the dugout for 24 hours due to the severity of the bombardment. Despite acknowledging the danger, the Company Sergeant Major said that Wall should have obeyed the order to leave the shelter. Following a short trial with only one testimony, Wall was executed.

=== Title ===
The origin of the name "Peaceful" for the novel's title character came from a gravestone at Bedford House Commonwealth War Graves Commission Cemetery near Ypres. Clare Morpurgo, Michael's wife, noticed a grave with the name "Private T.S.H. Peaceful of the Royal Fusiliers", a soldier who had died on 4 June 1915. Morpurgo has said "As soon as I saw it I knew I'd found the name for my main characters."

== Publication history ==
Private Peaceful was first published in hardback in 2003 by Harper Collins Children's Books. The first paperback publication was in 2004. The book has been translated into Chinese and French.

== Reception ==
Private Peaceful won the 2004 Red House Children's Book Award—an award judged entirely by a panel of children with no adults—beating Lola Rose by Jacqueline Wilson and Lirael by Garth Nix. Morpurgo said that he believed the ubiquity of war at the time of the award, such as the Iraq War and commemorations of D-Day, meant that the depiction of the First World War resonated with children. Private Peaceful was shortlisted for both the 2004 Whitbread children's book award and the Carnegie Medal. It won the 2005 Blue Peter Book Award and came first in the "Book I couldn't put down" category. Diane Samuels of The Guardian wrote that the novel has a gentle but persistent and ominous pace. She wrote that the tone of the prose is more reminiscent of an elderly man recounting his childhood and early life, rather than the direct perspective of a young man, which makes the prose feel distant. Morpurgo interviewed three men in their eighties to gather insight for the story, which Samuels said may have led to a sense of "literary conceit".

== Legacy ==
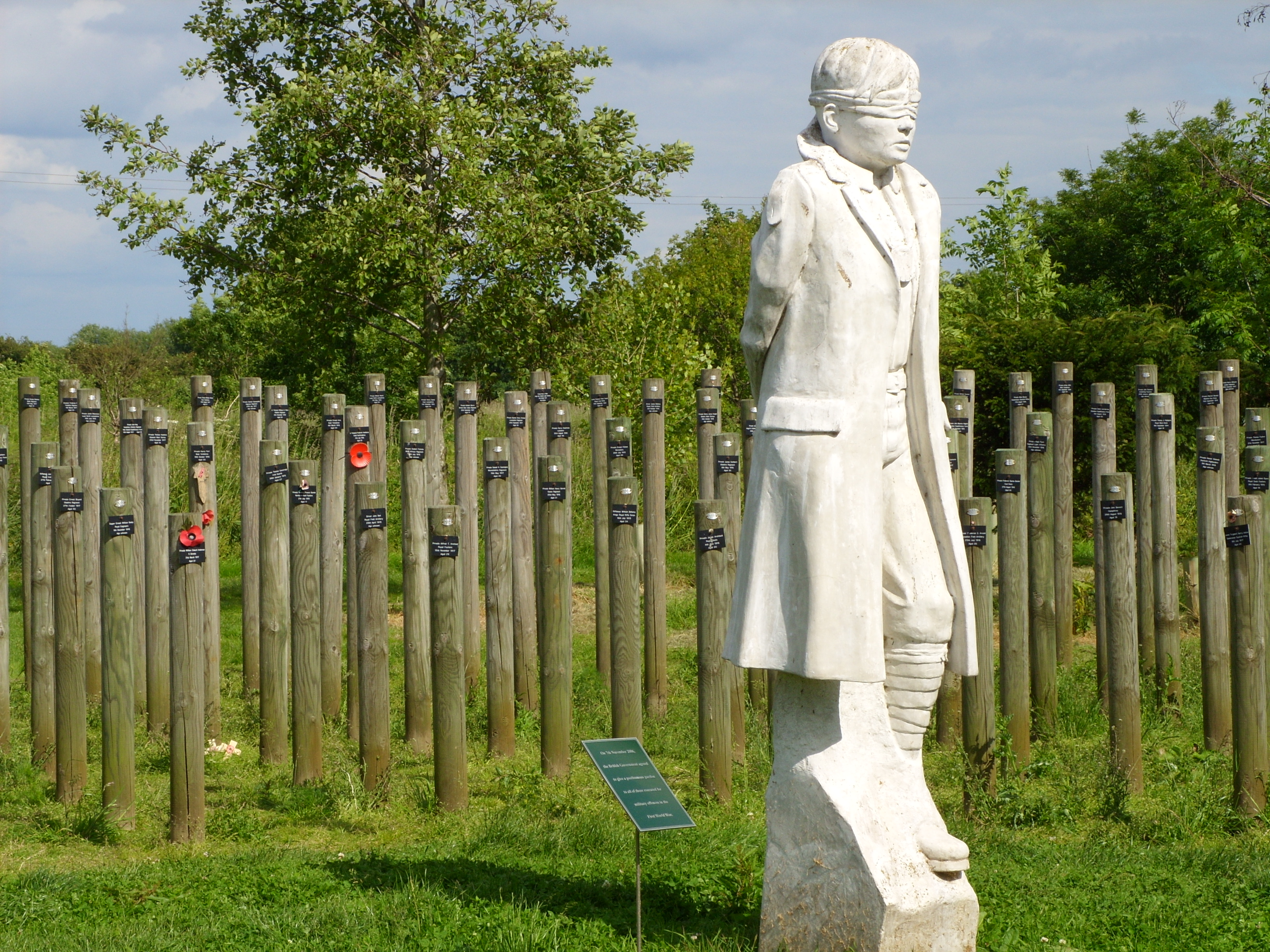
The Shot at Dawn Memorial at the National Memorial Arboretum commemorates the British and Commonwealth soldiers executed during the First World War.

=== Posthumous pardons ===
Private Peaceful helped further the campaign to pardon those soldiers who were executed for cowardice, desertion and other similar crimes. Morpurgo was one of the people who argued for change, including via a letter to Cherie Blair, wife of the then-Prime Minister Tony Blair. In 2006, Des Browne—the UK Defence Secretary—announced that 306 British and Commonwealth soldiers would be pardoned. The postscript of Private Peaceful editions was updated after the posthumous pardons were granted.

=== Thomas Samuel Henry Peaceful ===
When Morpurgo first saw the gravestone of Private T.S.H. Peaceful, the inspiration for the novel's name, in Bedford House Cemetery, the man's background was not known; Morpurgo said of him "He's as close to an unknown soldier as you can get". In 2018, it was discovered that the soldier's name had been misspelled, the correct name being Thomas Samuel Henry Peacefull. Peacefull's great-niece, Maxine Keeble, had spotted the similar name when listening to a radio adaptation of Private Peaceful. She wrote to Morpurgo after realising that the story's namesake was her great-uncle. A new headstone bearing the correct name was installed in July 2018 by the Commonwealth War Graves Commission, with Keeble, her husband, and Michael and Clare Morpurgo, as witnesses.

Thomas Samuel Henry Peacefull was born on 7 September 1893 in Battersea. He served in the war alongside three of his brothers, two —including Keeble's grandfather—survived. Peacefull died of his wounds in the Ypres Asylum in June 1915.

== Adaptations ==
=== Stage play ===
The book was adapted into a play of the same name by Simon Reade, first performed at the Bristol Old Vic in April 2004 starring Alexander Campbell. The play was performed at the Edinburgh Festival Fringe, London's West End, and toured the United Kingdom. Reade said he was inspired to adapt Morpurgo's book into a play after hearing an interview with Morpurgo on BBC Radio 4's Today programme. The play is a one-man production, consisting of just the actor and a bed on the stage, with a dramatic monologue to create a world around the character. Whilst in Morpurgo's novel it is Charlie Peaceful (Tommo's brother) who is shot for cowardice at the end of the story, Reade changed this in his stage play and Tommo himself is shot by the firing squad. Both the book and the adaptation of Private Peaceful helped the campaign to grant posthumous pardons to men executed during the war. At a 2012 production of the play at the Theatre Royal Haymarket, 306 names of men who were shot for cowardice, desertion and other related crimes were listed on the back of the programme.

A gender-flipped version of Reade's play was performed at The Barn in Cirencester in 2020. It was directed by Alexander Knott and Emily Costello played the part of Tommo. Dominic Cavendish of The Telegraph wrote that "Costello evokes a sturdy boyishness while eschewing male-impersonation – emblemising a spirit of youthfulness and hopefulness".

=== Radio play ===
A radio dramatisation of Private Peaceful, adapted by Simon Reade and directed and produced by Susan Roberts, was first broadcast on BBC Radio 4 in 2012. It was recorded in Iddesleigh in Devon, where the story is set. It starred Paul Chequer as Tommo, Nicholas Lyndhurst as Sergeant Hanley, and Michael Morpurgo as the vicar. It features music by Coope Boyes and Simpson. An abridged version of the radio adaptation was created for use in schools.

=== Concert ===
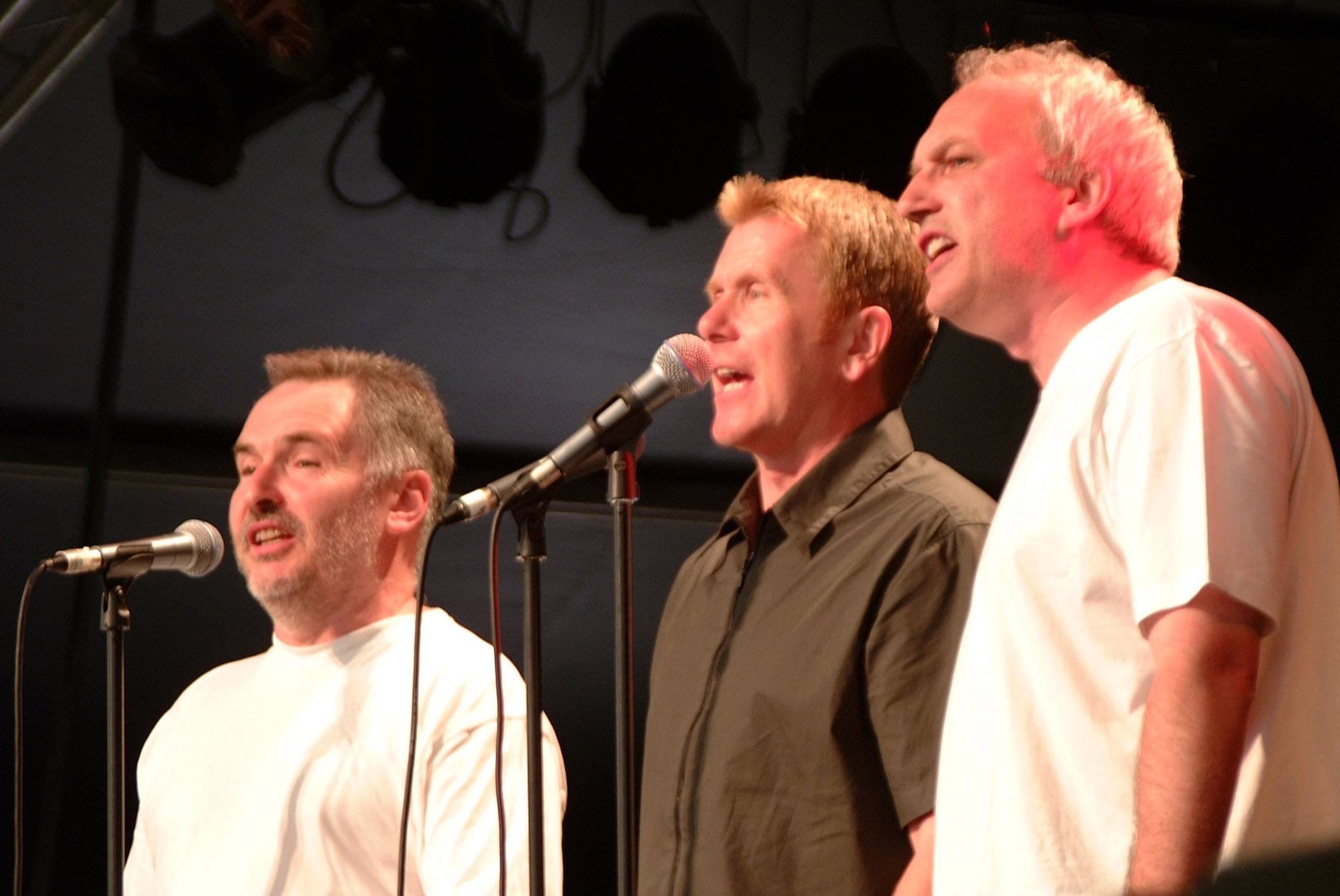
Private Peaceful: The Concert featured readings from the book and music from folk trio Coope Boyes and Simpson.

Morpurgo first met the folk trio Coope Boyes and Simpson whilst they were in Belgium, where the trio had become popular through their appearances at Passchendaele peace concerts. Morpurgo was inspired by their music and worked with them to create a Private Peaceful concert, combining readings from Private Peaceful with songs from Coope Boyes and Simpson. In 2006, a live recording of the concert was released called Private Peaceful: The Concert. The featured folk songs include some specifically about war, such as "The Sergeant's Having a Very Good Time" and "Hanging on the Old Barbed Wire", and other songs which are not about war, including "Hares on the Mountain" and "Oranges and Lemons".

=== Film ===
A feature film version of Private Peaceful, directed by Pat O'Connor with a screenplay by Simon Reade, was released in October 2012. It starred George MacKay as Tommo and Jack O'Connell as Charlie. In reviews of the film, comparisons were drawn to Steven Spielberg's War Horse—another adaptation of one of Morpurgo's novels. Unlike in the book, the film does not make it clear which of the Peaceful brothers is going to be executed at the end of the story. In the book, the older brother Charlie is executed. It deviates from the book in that Tommo goes to the Front before Charlie, who resists the war due to political reasons and not wanting to leave behind his pregnant wife. Simon Reade said this was a deliberate decision to create a rift between the brothers. Kate Stables of the magazine Sight & Sound described the film as "a small and intimate affair", and Peter Bradshaw of The Guardian wrote that it was "a small-scale story in essence, which works efficiently on the non-epic in which it's presented". Robbie Collin of The Telegraph wrote that the film was "warfare and poverty recast as snug escapism".

== See also ==
- List of books on military executions in World War I
- Shot at Dawn Memorial – War Memorial in the National Memorial Arboretum to commemorate 306 men shot for desertion and other offences.
- Thomas Highgate – The first British soldier to be executed during the First World War.
