= Michael Morpurgo =

British children's writer (born 1943)

Sir Michael Morpurgo OBE FRSL FKC DL
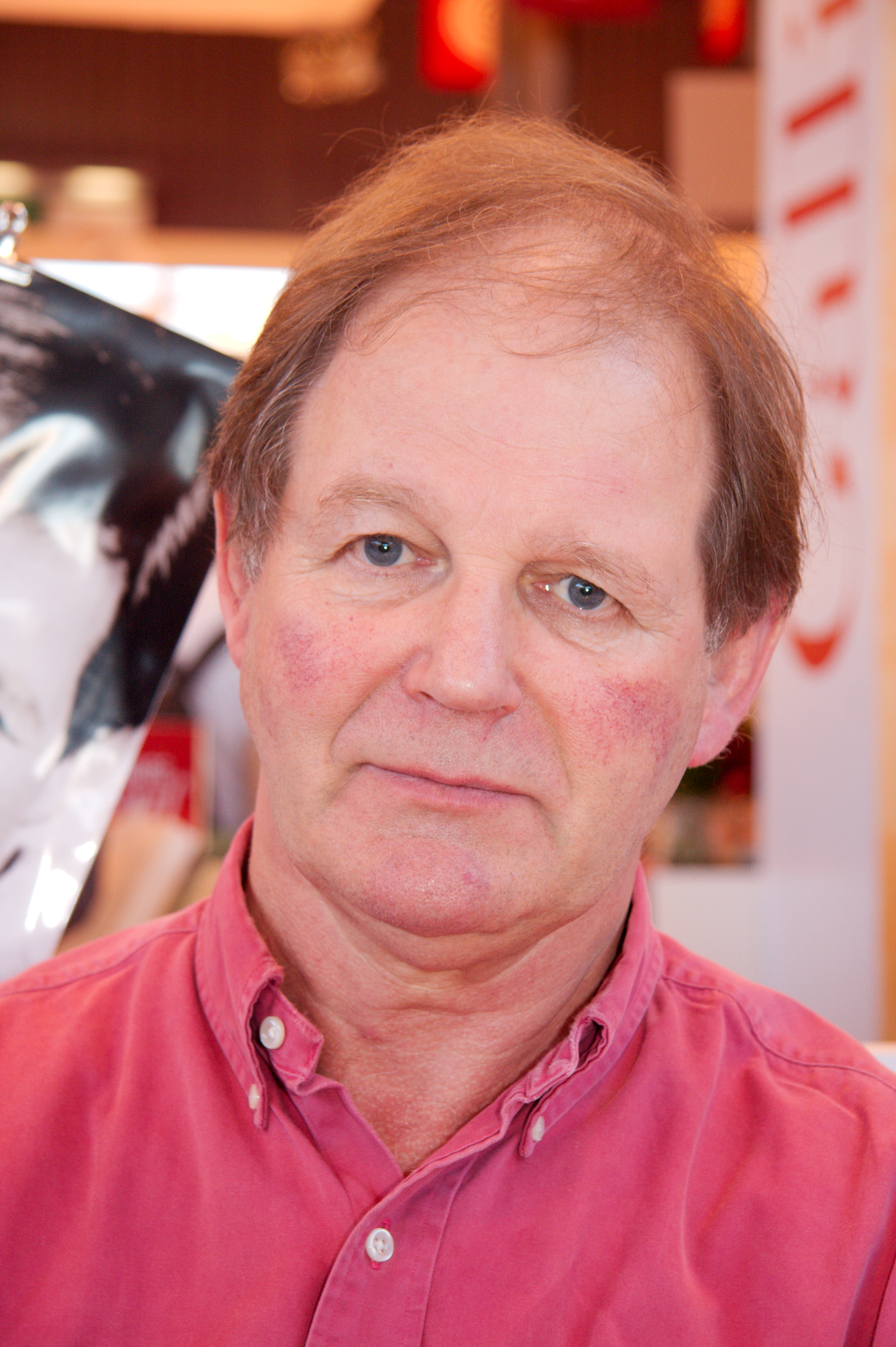
- Morpurgo in 2009
- Born: Michael Andrew Bridge; 5 October 1943 (age 83); St Albans, Hertfordshire, United Kingdom
- Education: King's College London
- Occupations: Author; poet; playwright
- Spouse: Clare Lane (m. 1963)
- Children: 3
- Parent(s): Tony Van Bridge (father); Kippe Cammaerts (mother)
- Writing career
- Notable works: War Horse, Why the Whales Came, Private Peaceful
- Website: michaelmorpurgo.com

Sir Michael Andrew Bridge Morpurgo (né Bridge; born 5 October 1943) is an English book author, poet, playwright, and librettist who is known best for children's novels such as War Horse (1982). His work is noted for its "magical storytelling", for recurring themes such as the triumph of an outsider or survival, for characters' relationships with nature, and for vivid settings such as the Cornish coast or the trenches of the First World War. Morpurgo was the third Children's Laureate, from 2003 to 2005, and is President of BookTrust, a children's reading charity.

== Background and childhood ==
Morpurgo was born Michael Andrew Bridge in 1943 in St Albans, Hertfordshire, the second child of actor Tony Van Bridge and actress Kippe Cammaerts (daughter of the writer and poet Émile Cammaerts). Both RADA graduates, his parents had met when they were acting in the same repertory company in 1938. His grandfather, Arthur Stanley Bridge, was a lighterage contractor and the son of a Wandsworth coal merchant, while his mother's family were actors, an opera singer, writers, and poets. They were married in 1941 while Van Bridge, having been called up in 1939 and by then stationed in Scotland, was on leave from the army. Morpurgo's brother Pieter was born in 1942. When Morpurgo was born the following year, his father was stationed in Baghdad.

While Van Bridge was away at war, Kippe Cammaerts met Jack Morpurgo (subsequently professor of American Literature at the University of Leeds). When Van Bridge returned to England in 1946, Cammaerts obtained a divorce from him and married Jack Morpurgo in 1947. Although they were not formally adopted, Morpurgo and his brother took on their step-father's name. Morpurgo's older brother, Pieter Morpurgo, later became a BBC television producer and director. He has two younger half siblings, Mark and Kay Morpurgo. Their mother was frail, having suffered a breakdown when she was 19, and grieved the loss of her brother Pieter, who was killed in the war in 1941, for the rest of her life.

Morpurgo and his brother were evacuated to Northumberland when they were very young. After they returned to London, the family lived in Philbeach Gardens, Earl's Court, where the children played on nearby bombsites. Morpurgo went to primary school at St Matthias, Earl's Court. The family later moved to Bradwell-on-Sea in Essex, where Morpurgo would live during the school holidays, having been sent to a boarding school in Sussex when he was seven years old. The school was very strict and the boys were beaten frequently. During this period Morpurgo developed a stutter. His unhappy experiences at boarding school would later inform his novel The Butterfly Lion. After six years at The Abbey School in Ashurst Wood, Morpurgo then went to the King's School, an independent school in Canterbury, Kent, where he felt less homesick than at

Morpurgo did not learn who his biological father was until he was 19 years old. After the divorce from Michael's mother, Van Bridge had emigrated to Canada and was never spoken about. Morpurgo never saw an image of his father until, while watching the 1962 CBC version of Great Expectations on TV with his mother, she recognised Van Bridge in the role of Magwitch and said to Michael "That's your father!" They met in person nine years later.

Morpurgo's stepfather was not encouraging to his sons and was disappointed that they were not meeting his expectations for them of going into academia like him, calling Michael "a bear with very little brain." His stepfather decided he should join the army and Morpurgo attended the Royal Military Academy Sandhurst. He quickly realised that a soldier's life was not for him and left after nine months. He said later that reading the poems of the First World War poets when he was a young soldier were "part of the reason I left the army and became a teacher and then a writer of many books about war in which a longing for peace and reconciliation is always evident."

Morpurgo later went to study at King's College London, reading English, French, and Philosophy, and graduated with a third class degree. He then joined the teaching profession with a job at a primary school in the village of Wickhambreaux near Canterbury in Kent. He also, in 1968, briefly taught at St. Faith's School in Cambridge.

== Writing Career ==
=== From teaching to writing novels ===
It was not until he was teaching in Kent that Morpurgo discovered his vocation in life, of which he later said "I could see there was magic in it for them, and realized there was magic in it for me."

Morpurgo's writing career was inspired by Ted Hughes' Poetry in the Making, Paul Gallico's The Snow Goose and Ernest Hemingway's The Old Man and the Sea. Hughes and another poet, Seán Rafferty, were influential in his career, with Hughes becoming a friend, mentor and neighbour. Morpurgo credits Hughes and Rafferty with giving him the confidence to write War Horse, his most successful work to date.

=== Works ===
Morpurgo is the author of dozens of books, including the notable titles:

- Friend or Foe (1977)
- All Around the Year (with Ted Hughes) (1979)
- The Nine Lives of Montezuma (1980)
- War Horse (1982)
- Twist Of Gold (1983)
- Little Foxes (1984)
- Why the Whales Came (1985)
- King of the Cloud Forests (1987)
- Mossop's Last Chance (with Shoo Rayner) (1988)
- My Friend Walter (1988)
- Mr. Nobody's Eyes (1989)
- Waiting for Anya (1990)
- Arthur: High King of Britain (1994)
- The Wreck of the Zanzibar (1995)
- The Butterfly Lion (1996)
- Robin of Sherwood (1996) (republished as Outlaw: The Story of Robin Hood (2012))
- Farm Boy (1997)
- Joan of Arc (1998) (republished as Sparrow: The True Story of Joan of Arc (2012))
- Kensuke's Kingdom (1999)
- Billy the Kid (2000)
- The Sleeping Sword (2002)
- Private Peaceful (2003)
- Sir Gawain and the Green Knight (2004)
- The Orchard Book of Aesop's Fables (2004), illustrated by Emma Chichester Clark
- War: Stories of Conflict (compiler) (2005)
- Meeting Cezanne (2005)
- The Amazing Story of Adolphus Tips (2005)
- Alone on a Wide Wide Sea (2006)
- Beowulf (2006), illustrated by Michael Foreman
- Born to Run (2007)
- Kaspar: Prince of Cats (2008)
- Running Wild (2009)
- The Kites Are Flying! (2009)
- Not Bad for a Bad Lad (2010)
- An Elephant in the Garden (2010)
- Shadow (2010)
- Little Manfred (2011)
- The Pied Piper of Hamelin (2011)
- Homecoming (2012)
- Where My Wellies Take Me (with Clare Morpurgo) (2012)
- A Medal for Leroy (2012)
- Beauty and the Beast (2013)
- The Castle in the Field – Little Gems (2013)
- Pinocchio By Pinocchio (2013)
- The Goose is Getting Fat (2013)
- All I Said Was (2014)
- Half a Man (2014)
- Listen to the Moon (2014)
- Mini Kid (2014)
- Such Stuff: A Story-Maker's Inspiration (2016)
- The Fox and the Ghost King (The Timeless Tale of an Impossible Dream) (2016)
- An Eagle in the Snow (2016)
- Greatest Magical Stories (2017)
- Lucky Button (2017)
- Toto: The Dog-Gone Amazing Story of the Wizard of Oz (2017)
- Flamingo Boy (2018)
- In the Mouth of the Wolf (2018)
- The Day the World Stopped Turning (2019)
- Grandpa Christmas (2020)
- A Song of Gladness (2021)
- The Puffin Keeper (2021)
- When Fishes Flew: The Story of Elena's War (2021)
- Carnival of the Animals (2021)
- Flying Scotsman and the Best Birthday Ever (2022)
- Cobweb (2024)

=== Adaptations ===
Gentle Giant was presented as an opera by composer Stephen McNeff and librettist Mike Kenny at the Royal Opera House in 2006. Film versions have been made of Friend or Foe (1981), Private Peaceful (2012) and When the Whales Came (1989), the latter also being adapted to a stage play. My Friend Walter (1988) 'Purple Penguins' (2000) and Out of the Ashes (2001) have been adapted for television movies.

Composer Stephen Barlow created a musical adaptation of Rainbow Bear, narrated by his wife Joanna Lumley. This was subsequently presented as a ballet by the National Youth Ballet of Great Britain in August 2010.

War Horse has been adapted as a radio broadcast and as a stage play by Nick Stafford, premiering at the National Theatre, London, on 17 October 2007. The horses were played by life-sized horse puppets designed and built by the Handspring Puppet Company of South Africa. It won two Olivier Awards in 2007. Initially intended to run for 16 weeks, due to popular demand the show transferred to the New London Theatre in the West End on 28 March 2009. It closed in the West End after eight years, having been seen by 2.7 million people in London and seven million worldwide at the time. It was the most successful production of the National Theatre ever.

On 15 March 2011, the show premiered on Broadway at the Vivian Beaumont Theater. The play's Broadway production won five Tony Awards, including Best Play. It went on several UK tours and was also staged in Australia, Canada, China, Germany, and The Netherlands. It was seen by seven million people outside the UK.

In 2011, War Horse was adapted by Lee Hall and Richard Curtis as a British film directed by Steven Spielberg. The film was nominated numerous awards, including six Academy Awards and five BAFTA Awards.

Waiting for Anya was adapted as a film of the same title released in 2020. Kensuke's Kingdom, following a fictionalised version of Morpurgo himself stranded on a desert island as a child, was adapted as a film of the same title first released in 2023 and widely released in 2024, with Aaron MacGregor voicing a young Michael, and Sally Hawkins and Cillian Murphy voicing his parents.

=== Reception and influence ===
Morpurgo has thirty books on the HarperCollins list and has sold more than 35 million books worldwide.

Reading Matters website calls Morpurgo's 1999 Kensuke's Kingdom "A quietly told story, but plenty of drama and emotion."

The Guardian described Private Peaceful, Morpurgo's 2003 novel for older children, as a "humanising and humane work".

=== Children's Laureate ===
Morpurgo and Ted Hughes, then Poet Laureate, originated the idea of the Children's Laureate role, and Morpurgo later became the third person to fill the two-year position, from 2003 to 2005.

=== Literary awards and prizes ===
Shortlisted

- 1991 Carnegie Medal: Waiting for Anya
- 1995 Carnegie Medal: Arthur, High King of Britain
- 1996 Carnegie Medal: The Wreck of the Zanzibar
- 2002 W. H. Smith Award for Children's Literature: Out of the Ashes
- 2003 Blue Peter Book Award: The Book I Couldn't Put Down: Cool!
- 2003 Carnegie Medal: Private Peaceful
- 2004 Whitbread Children's Book Award: Private Peaceful
- 2009 Sydney Taylor Book Award Notable title for Older Readers: The Mozart Question
- 2012 Bippo award for books
- 2010 Deutscher Jugendliteraturpreis (German youth literature prize): Warten auf Anya (Waiting for Anya)
- 2014 Costa Children's Book Award: Listen to the Moon

Awarded

- 1993 Prix Sorcières (France): King of the Cloud Forests
- 1995 Whitbread Children's Book Award: The Wreck of the Zanzibar
- 1996 Nestlé Smarties Book Prize (Gold Award): The Butterfly Lion
- 1999 Prix Sorcières (France): Wombat Goes Walkabout
- 2000 Red House Children's Book Award: Kensuke's Kingdom
- 2001 Prix Sorcières (France): Kensuke's Kingdom
- 2002 Nestlé Smarties Book Prize (Bronze Award): The Last Wolf
- 2004 Red House Children's Book Award: Private Peaceful
- 2005 Blue Peter Book of the Year Award: Private Peaceful
- 2005 Hampshire Book Award: Private Peaceful
- 2008 California Young Reader Medal: Private Peaceful
- 2011 Red House Children's Book Award: Shadow
- 2017 Red House Children's Book Award: An Eagle in the Snow
- 2021 Chen Bochui Children's Literature Award (China) – best author

== Personal life ==
In 1963, aged 19, Morpurgo married Clare Lane, eldest daughter of Allen Lane, the founder of Penguin Books. They had met the previous year on holiday in Corfu through Morpurgo's stepfather, who was an editor at Penguin at the time. Lane was pregnant with their first child and Morpurgo has referred to it as a shotgun wedding. Their three children are all named after Shakespearean characters.

His mother died in London in 1993.

Morpurgo was diagnosed with laryngeal cancer in 2017 and received radiotherapy. He has since recovered.

== Farms for City Children ==
In 1976, Morpurgo and his wife Clare established the charity Farms for City Children, with the primary aim of providing children from inner city areas with experience of the countryside. The programme involves the children spending a week at a countryside farm, during which they take part in purposeful farmyard work. The charity's first president was the couple's close friend and neighbour, Ted Hughes.

About 85,000 children have taken part in the scheme since it was set up, and the charity now has three farms in Wales, Devon, and Gloucestershire. Morpurgo has referred to the charity as his greatest achievement in life.

== Political views ==
In a January 2014 article, Morpurgo stated "as we begin to mark the century of the first world war, we should honour those who died, most certainly, and gratefully too, but we should never glorify. Come each November over the next four years, let the red poppy and the white poppy be worn together to honour those who died, to keep our faith with them, to make of this world a place where freedom and peace can reign together."

In August 2014, Morpurgo was one of 200 public figures who were signatories to a letter to The Guardian expressing their hope that Scotland would vote to remain part of the United Kingdom in September's referendum on that issue.

Prior to the 2015 general election, Morpurgo endorsed the parliamentary candidacy of the Green Party's Caroline Lucas.

In 2016, he condemned government plans to extend grammar schools as divisive and "quite deeply stupid".

In the run-up to the 2016 United Kingdom European Union membership referendum, Morpurgo expressed his support for the European Union in an interview with the BBC, and reinforced this with a ten-minute BBC Radio 4 A Point of View interview on 5 August 2018.

== Honours and appointments ==
Morpurgo and his wife Clare were each appointed Members of the Order of the British Empire (MBE) in the 1999 Birthday Honours for services to young people. He was advanced to Officer of the Order of the British Empire (OBE) in the 2006 Birthday Honours for services to literature and was made a Knight Bachelor in the 2018 New Year Honours for services to literature and charity.

He was elected a Fellow of the Royal Society of Literature in 2004.

In 2012, Morpurgo was made an Honorary Graduate of the University of Suffolk.

Morpurgo was awarded an honorary doctorate at Bishop Grosseteste University on 17 July 2013. He was awarded an Honorary Fellowship by the University of Chichester in 2014.

He was awarded the honorary degree of Doctor of Letters (D.Litt.) by Newcastle University on 12 July 2017.

Morpurgo was appointed a Deputy Lieutenant for Devon on 10 April 2015.

Morpurgo is also President of BookTrust, the UK's largest children's reading charity.

On 9 November 2023 Morpurgo was awarded an honorary doctorate at University of Plymouth, after writing almost all of his 150 books in the county of Devon.

== Radio and television broadcasts ==
- The Invention of Childhood (2006) (with Hugh Cunningham), BBC Radio 4
- Set Our Children Free: the 2011 Richard Dimbleby Lecture. BBC One, 15 February 2011.
- "Alone on a Wide Wide Sea": BBC Radio 2, 7–10 August 2017

== Biographies ==
- Carey, Joanna (1999). Interview with Michael Morpurgo. ISBN 9780749738662.
- Fergusson, Maggie (2012). Michael Morpurgo: War Child to War Horse. ISBN 9780007387267.
- Fox, Geoff (2004). Dear Mr Morpingo: Inside the World of Michael Morpurgo. Wizard. ISBN 9781840466072.
- McCarthy, Shaun (2005). Michael Morpurgo. ISBN 9780431179957.

Cultural offices
Preceded by Anne Fine	Children's Laureate of the United Kingdom; 2003–2005	Succeeded by Jacqueline Wilson
