= Lightstep =

Lightstep may refer to:

- LiteStep, a Windows shell replacement
- The Lightstep, a 2008 novel by English author John Dickinson
- Lightstep, an observability startup acquired by ServiceNow.
