= Sir Gawain and the Green Knight (children's novel) =

2004 British children's novel

- First edition cover
- Author: Michael Morpurgo
- Illustrator: Michael Foreman
- Language: English
- Genre: Children's novel
- Publisher: Walker Books
- Publication date: 1 October 2004
- Publication place: United Kingdom
- Media type: Print
- Pages: 114
- ISBN: 0-7445-8646-1

Sir Gawain and the Green Knight is a British children's novel written by Michael Morpurgo, and illustrated by Michael Foreman. It was originally published in the United Kingdom by Walker Books, and released in October 2004. The book is largely a translation and condensed version of the late 14th century Arthurian romance, Sir Gawain and the Green Knight.

== Synopsis ==
The story describes how Sir Gawain, who was not yet a knight of King Arthur's Round Table, accepts a challenge from a mysterious "Green Knight" who dares any man to strike him with his axe if he will take a return blow in a year and a day. Gawain accepts and beheads him, after which the Green Knight stands, picks up his head, and reminds Gawain of the appointed time. In his struggles to keep his bargain, Gawain demonstrates chivalry and loyalty until his honour is called into question by a test involving the lord and the lady of the castle at which he is a guest.

== Background ==
Sir Gawain and the Green Knight is a late 14th-century chivalric romance in Middle English alliterative verse. The author is unknown; the title was given centuries later. It is one of the best-known Arthurian stories, with its plot combining two types of folk motifs: the beheading game and the exchange of winnings. Written in stanzas of alliterative verse, each of which ends in a rhyming bob and wheel, it draws on Welsh, Irish, and English stories, as well as the French chivalric tradition.

Morpurgo said he first heard of Sir Gawain and the Green Knight when a university professor read the story aloud to the class, which in turn, nudged him along on his path to becoming a writer. He also states that when he retells a classic story like this, he must keep in mind that he is adapting it for the "modern reader", and at the same time, he also has to be careful not to lose the "essential power of the original story".

According to Daniel Nastali of Arthuriana, Sir Gawain and the Green Knight is "the most popular with modern audiences, amongst all the medieval Arthurian stories, and has been adapted in our time in every conceivable form, which makes its modern popularity truly a product of the twentieth century". He credits the elements of the story for its popularity; fantasy, sex, violence, a hero and an antagonist, a moral, and it's set in the realm of King Arthur.

== Release ==
The book was originally published with green text, by Walker Books in October 2004. The story is illustrated by British author and illustrator Michael Foreman, who has also collaborated with Morpurgo on Arthur, High King of Britain, Robin of Sherwood, Joan of Arc and An Elephant in the Garden.

== Reviews ==
Kirkus Reviews wrote that "Morpurgo offers a fluid translation of the 14th-century tale; several condensed versions of the story are available for young readers, but enhanced by striking art, plus handsome packaging that includes a text in perfectly legible green, this full rendition stands apart". Publishers Weekly said that "Morpurgo handles the text with care and gives young readers just enough of the humor and darkness of the original tale without overwhelming them".

Carolyn Phelan from Booklist stated "Morpurgo ably translates one of medieval England's greatest tales from verse into modern prose; he hasn't neglected the underpinnings of knightly conduct, courtly love, and Christian virtue that are a vital part of the original, but children will read this story for the adventure it is". She also complimented Michael Foremans illustrations as being "true to the story, full of energy, and aglow with colors that are sometimes subdued and sometimes fiery bright". Carl Harvey from Library Media Connection opined that "the legend has been written at a readable level for most intermediate students, and the illustrations are colorful additions to the overall story".

Connie Rockman from the School Library Journal wrote that "in the vibrant and compelling voice of a storyteller, Morpurgo retells this classic tale with a lively, page-turning style, his sprightly writing brings out all the humour as well as the horror of the original tale". She also praised Foreman's "profuse, evocative water-color-and-pastel illustrations, for highlighting the drama in each scene". The Reading Teacher noted that while "some aspects of the story can be interpreted as risque, such as when the wife of his host pursues Gawain's attentions, one is still compelled to find out how Sir Gawain will fare on his mysterious quest to come to terms with the Green Knight". They also observed that "the language is rich and etches unforgettable images, and Foreman's luxurious illustrations effectively create the medieval setting in which the story takes place".

== See also ==
- The Hollowing
- The Squire, His Knight, and His Lady
