= The Flight of Dragons (book) =

1979 speculative evolution book by Peter Dickinson

- Cover of the first edition
- Author: Peter Dickinson
- Illustrator: Wayne Anderson
- Language: English
- Subject: Dragons
- Publisher: Pierrot Publishing Ltd, UK – 1979; Paper Tiger, UK – 1998; Overlook Press, United States – 1998
- Publication date: August 2, 1979
- Publication place: United Kingdom
- Pages: 142

The Flight of Dragons is a 1979 speculative evolution book written by Peter Dickinson and illustrated by Wayne Anderson.

== Thesis ==
According to Dickinson's hypothesis, the chief obstacle to admitting the past existence of dragons is the difficulty of powered flight by such a large organism. To resolve this, he introduces a dirigible-like structure in which hydrochloric acid would dissolve large amounts of rapidly growing bone, releasing massive amounts of hydrogen that, once aloft, would support the body above the ground.

The dragon's wings are traced to "modifications of the ribcage" (an anatomical evolutionary path shared by the genus Draco), and the expulsion of fire from the throat, as a means of removal of excess gas. The absence of fossil evidence is traced again to the internal acids, which (in Dickinson's view) would dissolve the bones soon after death.

Dickinson states he got the idea for his "pseudo-scientific monograph" after looking at one of Ursula K. Le Guin's Earthsea books:

This one had a bulky body and rather stubby wings, which obviously would never get it airborne, let alone with the two people it was carrying on its back, and all its own weight of muscle and bone. Obviously any lift had to come from the body itself. Its very shape suggested some kind of gas-bag.

== Film ==
In 1982, Rankin/Bass Productions released a made-for-TV animated film The Flight of Dragons, aspects of which were based on Dickinson's book. For example, the character design in the film bears a resemblance to the illustrations in the book, and its lead character takes his name from the author, Peter Dickinson. However, the animated film derives most elements of its story line from the novel The Dragon and the George.

== See also ==
- The Last Dragon (2004 film), a docufiction film which uses similar speculative evolutionary ideas.
