= Dragon Knight (novel series) =

Novel series by Gordon R. Dickson

- Author: Gordon R. Dickson
- Country: United States
- Language: English
- Genre: Fantasy
- Media type: Print

The Dragon Knight is a series of fantasy novels begun in 1976 by American writer Gordon R. Dickson. The first book, based on the short story "St. Dragon and the George", was loosely adapted in the 1982 animated movie The Flight of Dragons by Rankin/Bass. The title here refers in part to an in-universe nomenclature, wherein the story's dragons use the name "george" as a synonym or substitute of "human", after 'St. George the Dragon-Slayer', and in part a reference to the latter.

== Characters ==
=== Jim Eckert ===
Baron Sir James Eckert de Bois de Malencontri et Riveroak, a.k.a. "the Dragon Knight" or sometimes "Sir Dragon".

The protagonist of the series, a minor academic originating in the 20th century, who to save his fiancée, Angela "Angie" Farell, follows her by astral projection to a parallel universe resembling medieval England, where his psyche is lodged in the body of a dragon named Gorbash. On consultation with the mystic Carolinus (see below), he is sent to rescue Angie from the immaterial evil known as the 'Dark Powers', and is mistitled a Baron by Carolinus (presumably to give him legal freedom of movement). At the end of The Dragon and the George, Jim regains his human form and obtains the land and titles of the deposed antagonist Sir Hugh, who re-appears later in the series.

In The Dragon Knight, Jim rules the estate Malencontri, with Angie as his wife; but finds himself capable of becoming a dragon, without the intervention of Gorbash, and becomes Carolinus' apprentice to control this ability. Having learnt this control enables several extraordinary deeds in the service of England, and later makes Jim eligible to join the 'Collegiate of Magickians' whereof Carolinus is a founder (a subplot emphasised in later books).

=== Sir Brian Neville-Smythe ===
Jim and Angie's closest friend; an idealistic, impoverished, zealous knight, present as Jim's companion throughout the series. His understanding of the medieval world proves a great asset to Jim, who is occasionally perplexed by its customs.

=== Silvanus Carolinus ===
Jim's mentor, and one of the three highest-rated (AAA+) magicians in the world. In some ways the modern stereotype or archetype of a Wizard: an omniscient, irascible, talkative old man capable of altering reality almost at will, consulted by every species of life-form, and often in conversation with intangible 'Powers'. Identified in later books as a founder of the Collegiate of Magickians to which he belongs. Noted for addressing every character, including royalty, by personal names or nicknames, without reference to title, and for extensive knowledge of anachronisms.

=== Dafydd Ap Hywel ===
A Welsh longbowman, likely the greatest in the world, and Jim's ally. Descended in part from a long-extinct line of royalty, associated with the 'Drowned Hundred' of folklore. Married after the first book to the female archer known as Danielle.

=== Aragh (changed to Aargh in later books) ===
A wolf capable of speech and noted for an abrasive character, distinguished by a strong nationalism, possessiveness of territory, and pragmatism. He is of exceptional size, by descent from the Dire Wolves, and able to move without being seen or heard, even when watched. He is an ally to all the main characters, including Jim.

=== Secondary characters ===
==== Lady Angela 'Angie' Eckert ====
Betrothed and later married to Jim, Angie appears as a damsel in distress in the first book, and later as chatelaine of Malencontri. Her role has varying degrees of importance, in that being a lady, she is required to remain at her own estate while Jim is away; to oversee all that occurs in it; and to maintain custom and courtesy in all situations. When the action is set in Malencontri, she is Jim's inseparable companion. Most of the books end with their re-union after an arduous adventure. As a rule, Angie takes negative stimuli with more poise than Jim, who is continually frustrated by the situations he encounters.

==== Gorbash ====
A Western dragon of the 'Cliffside' dragon colony, whose body was initially inhabited by Jim Eckert until Jim could bring his 'george' form into the medieval world. Not a companion as much as an alternate form assumed by Jim. Later a friend to the latter among the Cliffside dragons.

==== Smrgol ====
The "maternal grand-uncle" of the dragon Gorbash, and thus in some degree Jim's grand-uncle as well. Advisor to Jim/Gorbash throughout the first book (in which the two share a body). Depicted as comically pompous, but possessed of great courage and able to overawe the other dragons of his colony in any debate. Killed in the first book fighting a 'renegade' named Bryagh, who had earlier given Lady Angela to the Dark Powers.

==== Secoh ====
A wetland-dwelling "mere-dragon": one of a subspecies reduced in size and strength by the presence of the Dark Powers. Fought alongside Smrgol to kill the dragon Bryagh. Though initially cowardly and weak, Secoh increases in confidence, and is one of Jim's vital allies among the dragon community.

==== Giles o' the Wold ====
An itinerant archer, and leader of a band of similar men. Responsible for skirmishing against the forces of Sir Hugh outside the immediate vicinity of the Loathly Tower, the headquarters of the Dark Powers.

==== Danielle o' the Wold ====
Archer, daughter to Giles o' the Wold, and close friend to Aragh. Married to Dafydd after the first book. Thereafter she is mentioned by name, but usually in connection with her husband and their children, who are said to be numerous.

==== KinetetE ====
A female Magickian, described as "cadaverous-looking" and therefore depicted as severe of manner, and close colleague of Carolinus, KinetetE appears as Jim's magical advisor whenever Carolinus is unavailable. She is equal in rank to the latter, and appears initially as his judge in a magical contest. Addressed familiarly by Carolinus and Angie as "Kin".

==== Lady Geronde Isabel de Chaney ====
Chatelaine of Castle Malvern, betrothed to Sir Brian while they both wait for her father (Sir Orrin) to return home for permission to marry. Depicted as martial in character. Married to Sir Brian in The Dragon and the Fair Maid of Kent.

==== Sir John Chandos ====
A powerful and intelligent knight, who often enlists Jim to conduct difficult and unusual missions. Considered very handsome by his contemporaries, and therefore sometimes the object of Jim's jealousy when seen as too familiar with Angie.

==== Prince Edward Plantagenet ====
The hot-tempered, but good-natured son of the King, later identified as the historical 'Edward the Black Prince'. Edward owes Jim and Brian his freedom from captivity by the renegade Magickian Malvinne, and is known to speak on their behalf before the King.

==== King Edward III Plantagenet ====
The weak-willed, alcoholic monarch of England. Although he is Jim's superior and generally can be considered an ally, the King is impulsive and indecisive; character traits which occasionally put James and Angela's lives in danger.

==== May Heather ====
A young, but brave and loyal kitchen maid at Malencontri. Sometimes a source of worry to Sir James and Lady Angela, but otherwise considered an asset.

==== Rrrnlf ====
A humaniform, amphibious Giant, identified in a dialogue as a "Sea Devil". Described as essentially cone-shaped, in that he is largest in diameter at the head, and narrowest at the feet, with each area of the body narrower than the one above it. An ally to Sir James and Lady Angela, and able to travel from any body of water to any other regardless of physical removal. Usually depicted as amiable, cheerful, and slightly simple-minded, as well as affectionate and respectful of all whom he encounters.

==== Hob ====
The castle hobgoblin at Malencontri, and therefore sometimes identified as 'Malencontri hob'. His role is essentially that of a brownie in relation to the larger castle; but he is also Jim's messenger among the other mythical creatures, and sometimes a source of information. Implied to be immortal; originally a true goblin banished from the 'Kingdom of Demons' for his refusal to take part in wars, some centuries prior to the story.

==== Robert Falon ====
Jim and Angie's infant ward, introduced in The Dragon, the Earl, and the Troll, and said in later books to supply, in Angie's mind, the need of a son.

==== Sir Giles de Mer ====
A Selkie, companion to Jim and Brian.

=== Villains ===
==== The Dark Powers ====
A malicious force, chief antagonist of the series, having an especial grudge against humans and magicians, that unceasingly attempts to set the world into either boredom or chaos. Their power is centered at Loathly Tower and all immediate terrain, within England.

==== Sir Hugh de Bois ====
The former lord of Malencontri, much disliked by Aragh and Sir Brian. Betrayed England to enlist in the services of the Dark Powers, and later fled England, to re-appear in later books. Deposed by Jim/Gorbash and their allies. Notable for having scarred Lady Geronde, so that she remains 'disfigured' according to the standards of her society until her marriage to Sir Brian, whereat she is restored to her former appearance by an act of magic considered unusual by the other characters.

==== The Earl of Cumberland ====
The King's royal cousin. Power-hungry and ruthless, the Earl frequently attempts various plots to take the throne, even as far as attacking the mythical land of Lyonesse. The Earl regards the Dragon Knight and his companions as a constant annoyance to his schemes, which they consistently dismantle.

==== Lady Agatha Falon ====
The Earl's witch ally. Robert Falon's malevolent aunt. Shown as a relatively benign character in The Dragon, the Earl, and the Troll, wherein she is introduced; but depicted as malicious in later books.

==== Bryagh ====
Renegade dragon who left the Cliffside dragon community (whereof Smrgol and Gorbash were members) to serve the Dark Powers. Killed by Smrgol and Secoh.

==== Malvinne ====
A rogue magickian in league with the Dark Powers. A long-time rival of Carolinus. Defeated by Jim and company.

==== Sandmirks ====
Matriarchal, rodentine creatures that impel terror in their intended victims by production of high-frequency sound. These sounds have no effect on wolves, but take full effect on dragons and men alike.

==== Harpies ====
Flying creatures resembling those of classic mythology, whose bites contain lethal venom.

==== Worm ====
A large, mainly-featureless creature with thick skin and many rows of teeth. Defeated by Jim and Brian.

==== Ogre ====
A large, dim-witted, fireproof humanoid noted for impressive gripping power but limited movement at the shoulder. Smrgol and Jim/Gorbash are among a very few dragons to have slain one.

==== Sea-Lizard or Sea-Serpent ====
An amphibious reptile of tremendous size, considered traditional enemy of the dragons. One of these, by magical intervention, leads an invasion (in The Dragon at War) of England to destroy the dragons of England, but fails when fought and beaten by Jim Eckert.

==== Granfer ====
A Kraken, initially depicted as benign advisor to all marine and amphibious life; but later revealed to be ambitious, according to Carolinus, "to rule the world". It is Granfer that permits a large-scale invasion of England by the sea-serpents, and who connects them to the Italio-French sorcerer Julio Ecotti for this purpose. Banished by Carolinus.

==== Ahriman ====
A 'Great Demon', antagonist of The Dragon and the Djinn.

==== Deep-Earth Goblins ====
Antagonists of The Dragon and the Fair Maid of Kent, wherein they appear as a cause of the Black Death's proliferation in England, well before the accepted historic date. Especial enemies of the Castle Hobgoblins, whom they expelled from the 'Kingdom of Demons' centuries before the events of the books.

=== Other characters ===
==== Grottwold Weimar Hansen ====
University professor of various qualifications, whose experiments in astral projection transported Angie, and later the psyche and memories of Jim, into the medieval period. Considered "an unsavory character" by Jim, owing to their former rivalry for Angie's hand in marriage. Jim's instructor in hypnosis.

==== Dick Innkeeper ====
Owner of an inn, of moderate importance to the first book.

==== Son Won Phon ====
Chinese Magickian, who appears initially in The Dragon at War to challenge Jim's use of hypnosis on grounds that the latter was "Oriental magic" and ought have been taught by "a qualified Oriental instructor". Disproven by Carolinus. Son later appears as a specialist consulted by Carolinus, and in extension thereof by Jim.

==== Martti Lahti ====
Finnish magician, of a moderate rank (identified as 'B+') slightly higher than that of Jim, who appears among those observing Carolinus' challenge by Son Won Phon, and who prevents the injured Sir Brian and Dafydd ap Hywel dying from hemorrhage. Amiable, easy-mannered, and slightly condescending toward Jim.

==== Mnrogar ====
Self-proclaimed "King of the Trolls", this is a large and ancient troll living underneath the castle of an Earl. Although solitary, he maintains dominance over all the trolls in the region, and is therefore considered their superior. Addressed by Agatha Falon as "Grandfather" by reason of the years she spent as his ward.

=== Entities ===
==== Auditing Department ====
Intangibly-constructed, nearly-omnipresent entity of immense influence and wry humor, called the accounting office in later books, whose purpose is largely (though not exclusively) to monitor the use of magic by Magickians of the Collegiate, and thus to determine their right to accomplish certain magical feats. Usually appears as a "bass voice" approximately one meter from the ground, but can appear speaking from or through the local environment itself. Invoked by Carolinus early on, it does not take revenge on him for speaking to itself familiarly, but is addressed with deference by Jim.

==== History ====
A force of nature that influences events to follow a certain monotonous order. Opposed and balanced by Chance.

==== Chance ====
A force of nature that influences events toward chaos. Opposed and balanced by History.

== Novels ==
- The Dragon and the George (1976, Nelson Doubleday) British Fantasy Award
- The Dragon Knight (1990, Tor Books)
- The Dragon on the Border (1992, Berkley Pub Group)
- The Dragon at War (1992, Ace Hardcover)
- The Dragon, the Earl, and the Troll (1994, Ace Books)
- The Dragon and the Djinn (1995, Ace Hardcover)
- The Dragon and the Gnarly King (1997, Tor Books)
- The Dragon in Lyonesse (1998, Tor Books)
- The Dragon and the Fair Maid of Kent (2000, Tor Books)
- The Dragon and the Knight of Gahool (2014, interrupted by author's death)

The series' only short story "St. Dragon and the George", first published in The Magazine of Fantasy & Science Fiction of September 1957, was later expanded into the first novel of the series. It was later reprinted in several collections, among them A Dragon-Lover's Treasury of the Fantastic, edited by Margaret Weis.
