= The Dragon Knight (novel) =

1990 novel by Gordon R. Dickson

- Dust-jacket from the first edition.
- Author: Gordon R. Dickson
- Cover artist: Boris Vallejo
- Language: English
- Series: Dragon Knight
- Genre: Fantasy
- Publisher: Tor Books
- Publication date: August 17, 1990
- Publication place: United States
- Media type: Print (Hardcover & Paperback)
- Pages: 409 pp (first edition, hardback)
- ISBN: 0-312-93129-8 (first edition, hardback)
- OCLC: 21759569
- Dewey Decimal: 813/.54 20
- LC Class: PS3554.I328 D7 1990
- Preceded by: The Dragon and the George
- Followed by: The Dragon on the Border

The Dragon Knight is a fantasy novel by American writer Gordon R. Dickson, the second in his Dragon Knight series. The novel begins five months after the battle at Loathly Tower, which took place in The Dragon and the George.

== Plot ==
Jim and Angie are adjusting to their new lives within this parallel dimension of 14th-century medieval England, or as well as any 20th-century persons might. Jim, who is now the Sir James, Baron of Malencontri et Riveroak is trying to be a good English lord. However, fate conspires against him and sets him on an adventure to recover the prince of England, who is being held captive in France. Little does Jim know that he'll be going up against the interests of the "Dark Powers" who are already at work to thwart Jim's mission. This will culminate in Jim squaring off against the evil and powerful sorcerer Malvinne.

== Film ==
In June 2013, Seattle film director Jesse Stipek acquired the motion picture rights to produce a live-action adaptation of The Flight of Dragons, loosely based on characters and locations within the novel.

== Sources ==
- Clute, John; John Grant (1997). The Encyclopedia of Fantasy. New York: St. Martin's Press. p. 270. ISBN 0-88184-708-9.
- Clute, John; Peter Nicholls (1995). The Encyclopedia of Science Fiction. New York: St. Martin's Griffin. p. 332. ISBN 0-312-13486-X.
- Easton, Tom (May 1991). "The Reference Library". Analog Science Fiction and Fact. CXI (6). Davis Publications: 181.
- Letson, Russell (November 1990), "Locus Looks At Books", Locus, 25 (5): 19
- "Internet Speculative Fiction Database".
- The Dragon Knight (1990) publication contents at the Internet Speculative Fiction Database
