= Peter Dickinson =

English author & poet (1927–2015)

Peter Dickinson OBE FRSL
- Born: Peter Malcolm de Brissac Dickinson; 16 December 1927; Livingstone, Northern Rhodesia
- Died: 16 December 2015 (aged 88); Winchester, Hampshire, England
- Education: Eton College; King's College, Cambridge
- Occupations: Writer, poet
- Spouses: Mary Rose Barnard (m. 1953; died 1988) Robin McKinley (m. 1991)
- Children: 4, including Philippa Dickinson and John Dickinson
- Writing career
- Period: 1968–2015
- Genres: Crime fiction, children's novels and picture books
- Notable works: Tulku; The Flight of Dragons; City of Gold; Eva
- Notable awards: Horn Book Award; 1977; Guardian Prize; 1977; Carnegie Medal; 1979, 1980; Phoenix Award; 2001, 2008
- Website: www.peterdickinson.com

Peter Malcolm de Brissac Dickinson OBE FRSL (16 December 1927 – 16 December 2015) was an English author and poet, best known for children's books and detective stories.

Dickinson won the annual Carnegie Medal from the Library Association for both Tulku (1979) and City of Gold (1980), each being recognised as the year's outstanding children's book by a British subject. Through 2020 he is one of eight writers to win two Carnegies; no one has won three. He was also a highly commended runner-up (Note: Today there are usually eight books on the Carnegie shortlist. According to CCSU some runners-up through 2002 were Commended (from 1954) or Highly Commended (from 1966). The latter distinction became approximately annual in 1979; there were 29 highly commended books in 24 years including Dickinson and two others in 1988.) for Eva (1988) and four times a commended runner-up. (Note: The Devil's Children (1970), The Dancing Bear (1972), The Blue Hawk (1976), and A Bone From a Dry Sea (1992) were "Commended" runners-up for the Carnegie Medal. CCSU lists about 135 such distinctions from 1954 to 2002.)

For his contributions as a children's writer Dickinson was a finalist for the Hans Christian Andersen Medal in 2000.

== Life ==
Dickinson was born in Livingstone, Northern Rhodesia (now Zambia), the second of the four sons of a man in the colonial service and a farmer's daughter. As a child he loved stories about knights in armour and explorers, such as Ivanhoe and King Solomon's Mines, and read "anything by Kipling", who influenced his writing greatly.

His parents moved to England so that he and his brothers could attend English schools. His father died suddenly but Dickinson entered Saint Ronan's prep school in 1936 with support from the family. His novel Hindsight is based on the period in Devon after the school was evacuated from Kent during the war. He entered Eton College in 1941.

Dickinson remained at Eton until 1946. After completing his national service (1946–48), he studied at King's College, Cambridge, graduating with a Bachelor of Arts degree in 1951. For seventeen years he worked as assistant editor, resident poet and reviewer for Punch magazine. His first two books were published in 1968 and were very well received, one mystery for adults and one science fiction for children. He completed sequels to both debut novels and left Punch to be a full-time author next year. He continued to write poetry for entertainment and occasionally on commission.

Dickinson married Mary Rose Barnard in 1953; the couple had two daughters and two sons including the children's editor and publisher Philippa Dickinson and the writer John Dickinson. Mary Rose died in 1988.

In 1983, Dickinson had met Robin McKinley, an American author of fantasy, some written for children. After a long friendship, they married in 1991. She said in 2009 that she cannot judge the literary work of people she likes personally, but: "Fortunately I had been passionately devoted to his books years before I met him so I can merely go on thinking they're wonderful and he's brilliant now."

Dickinson was elected a Fellow of the Royal Society of Literature in 1999 and appointed an Officer of the Order of the British Empire (OBE) in the 2009 Birthday Honours. He was also chairman of the Society of Authors.

For years he listed manual labour as one pastime; at 85 he listed only bridge and gardening. He died after an illness on 16 December 2015, his 88th birthday.

== Writer ==
Dickinson published almost fifty books, which fall into three general categories: crime fiction for adults (including the James Pibble series), speculative and supernatural fiction for older children, and simpler children's books. One of his few other books was the collection Chance, Luck and Destiny (1975), which he calls "prose and verse, fact and fiction, on the themes of the title". It won the second annual Boston Globe–Horn Book Award for children's nonfiction in 1977.

The "Changes" trilogy comprises three early books for children, The Weathermonger, Heartsease and The Devil's Children (1968 to 1970). It was heavily adapted in 1975 as a BBC TV series, The Changes. The trilogy was written in reverse order: The Devil's Children is actually the first book in terms of the trilogy's chronology, Heartsease the second, and The Weathermonger the third.

Dickinson's first two mysteries both won the Crime Writers' Association's Gold Dagger, Skin Deep in 1968 and A Pride of Heroes in 1969. He was at least as successful with his children's books. He won the 1977 Guardian Children's Fiction Prize for The Blue Hawk, an award judged by British children's writers, which no author may win twice. For Tulku (1979) he won both the Whitbread Children's Book Award and finally the Carnegie Medal after being a commended runner-up three times. He won the Carnegie again next year for City of Gold. In 1982 he was named to the International Board of Books for Young People Honor List for Tulku, and The Iron Lion was selected one of New York Times Notable Books. Eva (1988) was a runner-up for both the Carnegie (highly commended) and the Horn Book Award. In 2008 it won the Phoenix Award from the Children's Literature Association as the best English-language children's book that did not win a major award when it was originally published twenty years earlier. Dickinson and The Seventh Raven (1981) had won the same award in 2001. The Kin (1998) made the Whitbread Award shortlist.

City of Gold and other stories from the Old Testament (Gollancz, 1980), illustrated by Michael Foreman, was a "radical" retelling of 33 stories, according to the retrospective online Carnegie Medal citation. "It is set in a time before the Bible was written down, when its stories where handed from generation to generation by the spoken word." Illustrator Foreman was highly commended runner-up for the Library Association's companion Kate Greenaway Medal.

A pair of alternative history novels, King and Joker (1976) and Skeleton-in-Waiting (1989), are based on the premise that Prince Albert Victor, Duke of Clarence and Avondale (1864–1892) survives and ultimately reigns as King Victor I of the United Kingdom.

The biennial Hans Christian Andersen Award conferred by the International Board on Books for Young People is the highest recognition available to a writer or illustrator of children's books. Dickinson was one of five finalists for the writing award in 2000 (and the British nominee in 1988 as well).

A collection of his own previously published and new poetry, The Weir: Poems by Peter Dickinson, was published on the occasion of his 80th birthday in 2007, as a gift from his four children.

His last works were Earth and Air (Small Beer Press, 2012), and In the Palace of the Khans (Peter Dickinson Books, 2012). The former continues the "Tales of Elemental Spirits" whose first two volumes Water and Fire comprise stories by both Dickinson and Robin McKinley.

Dickinson's literary archive is one of those in Seven Stories, the National Centre for Children's Books.

== Motion pictures ==
In 1982, Rankin/Bass Productions released The Flight of Dragons, a made-for-TV animated film, aspects of which were based on Dickinson's book. The character design in the film bears a resemblance to the illustrations in the book. However, the novel The Dragon and the George by Gordon R. Dickson was the inspiration for the film's plot. One of the main characters is Peter Dickinson, the book's author himself struggling to complete his text.

== Works ==
=== Novels for children and young adults ===
Changes trilogy

- The Weathermonger (1968)
- Heartsease (1969)
- The Devil's Children (1970), illus. Robert Hales

Other novels

- Emma Tupper's Diary (1970)
- Mandog (1972)
- The Dancing Bear (1972), illus. David Smee
- The Gift (1973)
- The Blue Hawk (1976), illus. David Smee —winner of the 1977 Guardian Prize
- Annerton Pit (1977), illus. Anne Yvonne Gilbert
- Tulku (1979) —winner of the 1979 Carnegie Medal
- The Seventh Raven (1981) —winner of the 2001 Phoenix Award
- Healer (1983)
- A Box of Nothing (1985)
- Eva (1988) —highly commended for the Carnegie Medal and winner of the 2008 Phoenix Award
- AK (1990) —winner of the 1990 Whitbread Children's Book Award
- A Bone from a Dry Sea (1992)
- Shadow of a Hero (1993)
- Time and the Clock Mice, Etcetera (1993), illus. Emma Chichester Clark
- The Kin (1998)
  - Suth's Story
  - Noli's Story
  - Ko's Story
  - Mana's Story
- The Lion Tamer's Daughter (1999) (Note: Touch and Go (London: MacMillan, 1999) is a collection of "three short stories with 'fear' as a theme", named for the longest of them, a novella (per ISFDB; 17,500 to 40,000 words). The Lion Tamer's Daughter (London: MacMillan, 1999) is a novel (per ISFDB; more than 40,000 words). They had been published in the U.S. as a collection of four stories named for the longest, The Lion Tamer's Daughter and other stories (New York: Delacorte, 1997), in which three were original and one was already ten years old, from a British magazine. So three of the stories were first published in America. All three books are listed here. Sources: Peter Dickinson, "Children's Books"; ISFDB, "Peter Dickinson". The U.S. Library of Congress 1997 summary: "Each of these stories touches on the idea of a twin, ghostly double of a live person, or a secret self." .)
- The Ropemaker (2001)
- The Tears of the Salamander (2003)
- The Gift Boat (2004); US title: Inside Granddad
- Angel Isle (2006); a sequel to The Ropemaker
- In the Palace of the Khans (2012)

=== Mystery fiction for adults ===
James Pibble series

- Skin Deep (1968); US: The Glass-Sided Ants' Nest
- A Pride of Heroes (1969); US: The Old English Peep-Show
- The Seals (1970); US: The Sinful Stones
- Sleep and His Brother (1971)
- The Lizard in the Cup (1972)
- One Foot in the Grave (1979)

Other novels

- The Green Gene (1973)
- The Poison Oracle (1974)
- The Lively Dead (1975)
- King and Joker (1976)
- Walking Dead (1977)
- A Summer in the Twenties (1981)
- The Last Houseparty (1982)
- Hindsight (1983)
- Death of a Unicorn (1984)
- Tefuga (1985)
- Skeleton-in-Waiting (1987)
- Perfect Gallows (1988)
- Play Dead (1991)
- The Yellow Room Conspiracy (1992)
- Some Deaths Before Dying (1999)

=== Children's picture books ===
- The Iron Lion (1973), illus. Marc Brown, later Pauline Baynes
- Hepzibah (1978), illustrated by Sue Porter
- Giant Cold (1984), illus. Alan Cober
- Mole Hole (1987)
- Chuck and Danielle (1996)

=== Short story collections ===
- Merlin Dreams (1988)
- The Lion Tamer's Daughter and other stories (1997)
- Touch and Go (1999)
- Water: Tales of Elemental Spirits (2002), by Dickinson and Robin McKinley; later, Elementals: Water
- Fire: Tales of Elemental Spirits (2009), by Dickinson and Robin McKinley
- Earth and Air: Tales of Elemental Creatures (2012), by Dickinson alone

=== Other books ===
- Chance, Luck and Destiny (1975) —about probability and coincidence; winner of the Boston Globe–Horn Book Award, nonfiction category
- The Flight of Dragons (1979), illus. Wayne Anderson —"speculative natural history" adapted by Rankin and Bass jointly with another work as the animated film The Flight of Dragons (1982)
- City of Gold and other stories from the Old Testament (1980), retold by Dickinson, illus. Michael Foreman —winner of the 1980 Carnegie Medal
