= Eva (novel) =

1988 novel by Peter Dickinson

- First edition
- Author: Peter Dickinson
- Cover artist: Alun Hood
- Language: English
- Genre: Science fiction novel for young adults
- Publisher: Victor Gollancz Ltd
- Publication date: 6 Oct 1988
- Publication place: United Kingdom
- Media type: Print (hardcover)
- Pages: 207
- ISBN: 978-0-575-04354-1
- OCLC: 456359343
- LC Class: PZ7.D562 Ev 1989

Eva is a science fiction novel for young adults by Peter Dickinson, published by Gollancz in 1988. Set in a dystopian future, it features "the hybrid that results when the brain-patterns and memory of a dying girl are transferred into the brain of a chimpanzee." Dickinson researched chimp behavior for the book and dedicated it to Jane Goodall.

Eva was highly commended for the annual British Carnegie Medal and in 2008 it won the retrospective Phoenix Award. It is one of Dickinson's best known works and by far his most popular in the U.S.

== Plot introduction ==
When 13-year-old Eva is badly injured in a car accident, her consciousness is transplanted into the body of a chimpanzee. (Note: Futuristic medical techniques were used on Eva; it was noted in the novel that the procedure had been used before but never with lasting success. It was theorized that it worked on Eva because of her close association with chimpanzees from an early age.) The novel concerns her efforts to adjust to her unique situation. The setting is a future when urban civilization has spread across the globe, with disastrous effects on other species.

== Plot summary ==
The novel opens as Eva wakes up in a hospital bed, paralyzed. Her mother assures her she will be fine, that the doctors will gradually reduce the paralysis. Eva guesses that her face has been badly scarred, but when she looks in a mirror, she sees the face of a chimpanzee. An experimental procedure has been used to transplant Eva's "neuron memory" into Kelly, a young chimp from her father's research facility.

Eva learns to adapt to her new body, using a keyboard to simulate her voice. She has dreams of a forest she has never seen - that Kelly has never seen either - and imagines it comes from the chimpanzee unconscious. She realizes that she must accept the chimpanzee part of herself, which is easier for her as she has grown up with her father's chimps.

The cost of the procedure has been met by a media company in return for broadcast rights. Eva is a big hit with the public and her family has to cope with massive media interest. The power of the 'shaper' companies is immense in a world where many people spend all day at home. 'Shaper' technology is a cross between television and virtual reality.

Eva spends most of her time with humans, even going to school, but also spends time in the Reserve, where she learns to adapt to the chimpanzee social group. Her human understanding helps her to manipulate some of the situations and she becomes accepted by the others. One particularly intelligent chimp, Sniff, is intrigued by her.

With the introduction of enthusiastic animal rights advocate Grog Kennedy the novel takes another turn. He convinces Eva that for the sake of the species the chimpanzees must return to the wild. Not only do they belong there, but Grog believes the human race is running out of steam and will before long no longer bother to care for animals in captivity. At this stage there are only small pockets of wilderness left, and most species have died out.

Grog and Eva devise an ingenious plan to get the chimps to the island of St. Hilaire near Madagascar where Eva and Sniff lead the others in an escape. Her human knowledge is necessary to help the chimps learn the skills necessary to survive, which means that she must cut herself off from other humans. The novel ends twenty-four years later when Eva is near death, the human race is in decline and Eva imagines a future in which the descendants of her band of chimpanzees become the new dominant race.

== Relation to Dickinson's other works ==
The novel returns to the ecological themes of the Changes trilogy (1968–70) and Emma Tupper's Diary (1970). The former imagines a psychological change in the human race, the latter deals with the survival of a species. In one of his mystery novels, The Poison Oracle (1974), a chimpanzee who has learned to communicate becomes a witness in a murder case.

Dickinson wrote City of Gold and other stories from the Old Testament (1980) for a series of retellings and classics illustrated by Michael Foreman. His editor then asked him to tackle Arthurian legends for the same series; he was intrigued but found the material on King Arthur too thin to work with. That generated Merlin Dreams (1988), which features "Merlin drowsing the centuries away under his rock, waking from time to time and recalling some item from the mythic Celtic past, and then dreaming a story about it." But they are Dickinson's stories, not existing Arthurian stories. Next he decided to "do something with the various First Women that people have imagined at different times — Eve of course, and the shadowy figures of classical myth, and as many of the other cultural traditions I could find and work in." Rather than time-travel, or dreams, his heroine would somehow meet the Eve myth while in a coma — in a future where "the Eve myth [had] dwindled to a cheap TV cartoon."

Dickinson originally conceived Eva as a woman making contact with an early ancestress while in a coma. The book was much changed from the original concept, but the Adam and Eve cartoon which Eva watches is a remnant of it, and Eva herself becomes an ancestress of sorts. Dickinson has since returned to our remote ancestors in A Bone from a Dry Sea (1992) and The Kin (1998).

== Awards ==
When it was new, Eva was a highly commended runner-up (Note: Today there are usually eight books on the Carnegie shortlist. CCSU lists 32 "Highly Commended" runners up from 1966 to 2002 but only three before 1979 when the distinction became approximately annual. From 1979 there were 29 "HC" books in 24 years including Dickinson and two others in 1988.) for the Carnegie Medal from the British Library Association, recognising the year's best children's book by a British subject, and an honor book for the Boston Globe-Horn Book Award in the US. In 1992 it won the Senior Division Young Reader's Choice Award from the Pacific Northwest Library Association (US and Canada), which annually recognises one three-year-old book.

Eva won the 2008 Phoenix Award from the Children's Literature Association as the best English-language children's book that did not win a major award when it was originally published twenty years earlier. That is named for the mythical bird phoenix, which is reborn from its ashes, to suggest the book's rise from obscurity. In his acceptance speech Dickinson noted that after years of speaking to and corresponding with readers, primarily Americans, "I was astonished to find ... that it was eligible. I was convinced it must have won something important enough to disqualify it."

== Reception ==
Eva is one of Peter Dickinson's best-known books. The author says: "80% of my mail, almost all of it from the USA, is about this one book. This baffles me." The novel is used in classroom study to stimulate discussion of medical ethics, animal rights and other issues. Dickinson professes "mixed feelings about his books being studied in schools" and he currently publishes a reply to Professor Carter, with 2001 copyright date, "A Letter in Response to an Article About Teaching Eva". He contrasts with "Professor Carter" and others "the naive reader ... [who] is doing no more than experiencing the book by re-imagining my invention, in something like the manner in which I imagined it." For him, he says, "it's enough if the naive one simply takes it aboard as part of his/her subconscious awareness."

Neil Philip in the Times Literary Supplement called Eva "one of the better books of a first-rate writer. It is highly provocative, it has tenderness, humour and passion. It involves the reader from the very first page and will not quickly leave the mind." Ethel Heins in a Horn Book review called it "a work of passion and eloquence, and its sobering significance increases in proportion to the reader's maturity." In an academic journal article ten years later, Kathryn V. Graham placed Eva in a tradition of British children's literature that elevates the rural setting above the urban (Exodus from the City).

Betty Carter took a "Second Look" at Eva in the September/October 2001 issue of The Horn Book Magazine. She cites Eva as a good illustration of Dickinson's place as a thought-provoking author for young adults. "The topics raised in Eva transcend the fleeting concerns of adolescence. Dickinson shows tremendous respect for his readers and their ability to grapple with hard issues that range from euthanasia to the influence of the media."

== Publication history ==
Delacorte Press published the first U.S. edition early in 1989. There were paperback editions no later than 1990 in the U.S. (Laurel Leaf, mass-market) and 1991 in the U.K. (Corgi).

WorldCat participating libraries report holding copies in Spanish, Italian, Norwegian, German and Swedish-language translations.
