= The Sleeping Sword =

2002 British children's novel

- Book cover
- Author: Michael Morpurgo
- Illustrator: Michael Foreman
- Language: English
- Genre: Children's literature
- Publisher: Egmont Books
- Publication date: 1 March 2002
- Publication place: United Kingdom
- Pages: 160
- ISBN: 978-0749748524
- OCLC: 59368145

The Sleeping Sword is a British children's novel written by Michael Morpurgo, and illustrated by Michael Foreman. The book was first published in the United Kingdom by Egmont Books in 2002. The sword found on the island of Bryher, inspired Morpurgo's Arthurian tale, set in the Scilly Isles, and is a story within a story.

== Plot ==
I launched myself into the most spectacular shallow dive I could. I remember thinking that it seemed to be taking longer than it should to reach the water.

After that I remember nothing

— Bun Bundle

Ten-year-old Bun Bundle lives with his parents on the island of Scilly, where the population is only around eighty people. His two best friends are Dan and Liam; the three of them are often referred to as The Three Musketeers. There is also Anna, Dan's older sister whom Bun has a secret crush on. While Dan and Liam are his best mates, Anna is his best friend. One day Liam and Dan invite him to come down to the quay for a swim. At first he declines, but later reconsiders, thinking Anna might be there. When he got to the quay, Anna was there, so he decided to impress her, and took off running and dived into the water.

The next thing he remembers is waking up in the hospital with a bandage wrapped around his eyes. His mother was there, so he asked her what happened. She tells him the water was really shallow where he dived in and he hit his head on a rock. When the bandages finally come off, he soon realizes that he has lost his eyesight. Over the next few weeks, he goes through some hard times, even thinking about suicide, but his friends help him find the strength to overcome his disability. One day as he is on his way to find his father on the tractor, he falls into a hole, and his father pulls him out. Later, his dad informs him that it was a tomb of some sort he had fallen into, and there was stuff down there, like a sword and a shield. Thinking about what his father had told him about the grave possibly being around fifteen or sixteen hundred years old, Bun thought to himself this was when King Arthur had lived. When his father brought the sword into the house to be examined, Bun felt a funny feeling come over him as he touched and felt over the sword with his hands. After his parents went to bed, he snuck back downstairs, and found the sword, and started playing with it, and suddenly he realized he could see again, and there standing in the kitchen was an old man with long hair and a beard who introduced himself as Bedevere from the Court of King Arthur, who was sent by the magician Merlin. He tells Bun the sword he is holding is Excalibur.

Bedivere instructs him that he must take the sword to King Arthur. So he decides to take Anna along with him. They go to the quay, where a ship is waiting to take them to the King. When they arrive, Bun suddenly remembers he had met the King before, as told in Arthur, High King of Britain, and Arthur is reunited with his shield and his sword, Excalibur. Arthur then reveals that Bun must drive Excalibur back into the stone until it is time for the King to come again. Bun and Anna return to Bryher on the ghost ship, hardly believing what has happened. The next morning Bun wakes up to find his sight has been restored, the sword and shield are back in the tomb in the field and Anna is totally unaware of the previous night's events. Bun takes off to the field towards his father's tractor, and suddenly falls down a cavity. The tractor is rumbling towards him ... and he knows everything he's dreamed about the night before is about to come true.

== Background ==
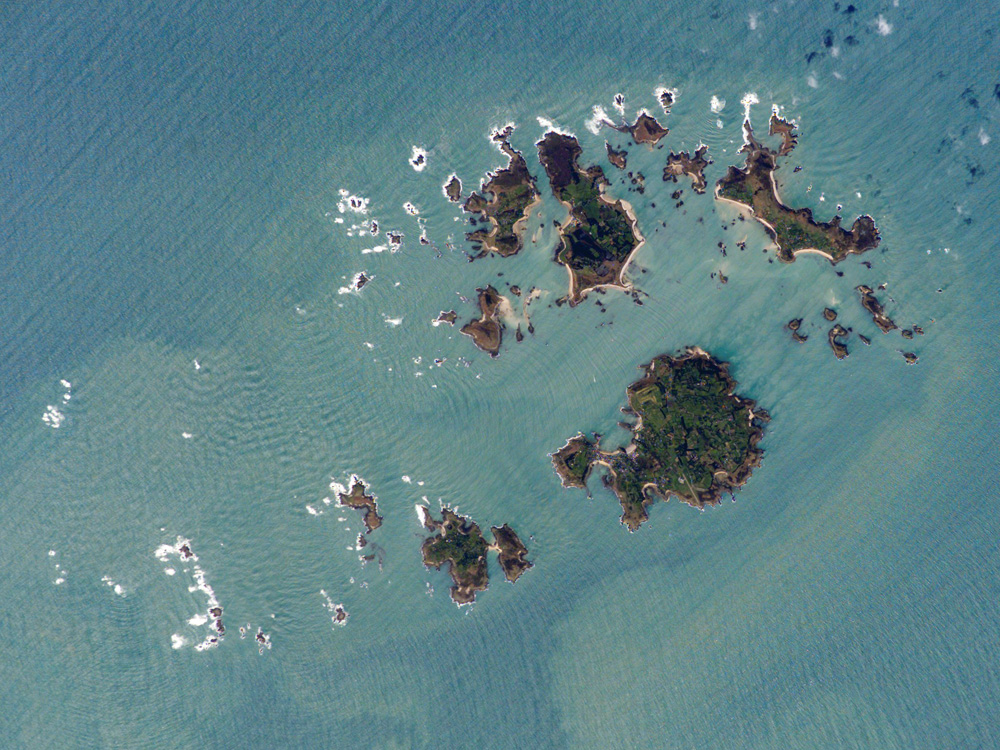
The Isles of Scilly, viewed from the International Space Station

The Bryher Woman was an iron-age woman whose cist grave, containing a mirror and a sword, was discovered on Bryher, Isles of Scilly, in 1999. The grave was discovered by a farmer working in a potato-field at Hillside Farm on Bryher in March 1999, when his tractor wheel sank into the ground and to free it he moved a large stone which revealed the cist. He reached into the cavity and found a sword. He contacted the British Museum who advised him to take it to the Isles of Scilly Museum, where it was identified as a La Tène II iron sword.

Morpurgo was inspired to write the novel after hearing about the real life story of how the grave, with the sword and shield, was found on Bryher. Like many of his other books, he set the story in the Scilly Isles as well. Morpurgo opined that the Isles have become his Narnia; "there is a story in every [ship]wreck and every rock there". Another inspiration for the story was his stepfather, whose name he carries, and the only father he has ever known since his own father left the family when he was two. His stepfather had been blind for the last 25 years, and Morpurgo who was understandably distraught over this, decided to "explore it in his fiction; he has always felt free, he says, to air adult anxieties and concerns in his stories for children". After he finished writing the novel, he dedicated the book to the people of Bryher.

== Reviews ==
English writer of children's books Tony Bradman said he "found it contrived and a bit of a hotch-potch; the elements of the plot don't really cohere into a viable story". Anne Johnstone from The Herald wrote that "Morpurgo's books work because, like the best conmen, he takes us inside his narrative and makes us believe it, however unlikely; a blind boy who stumbles on an ancient sword and through it meets King Arthur? Sure, why not?" British journalist JoAnne Good said the story is "fine writing, and also a great read-aloud".

British writer Julia Eccleshare opined that even though "Bun is blinded in a diving accident, he finds peace after a magical encounter with the legendary King Arthur". She also thought that the novel is among "Morpurgo's most thoughtful books; it elicits a genuine emotional response, partly because it leaves some refreshing space to wonder". Damian Kelleher wrote in the Evening Standard that the "book is about the power of stories – to inspire, to entertain, and even to heal – and Morpurgo tells his tale with conviction and warmth". Nicolette Jones wrote in The Times that Morpurgo has "a history of using history in his fiction; he sometimes employs the supernatural; like a dream sequence about King Arthur in The Sleeping Sword, and he also has a genius for breathing life into the past". She further opined that the author "has woven a story that plays adventurously with narrative, and blurs the line between truth and imagination; in this case its lesson in empathy is focused on understanding what it might be like to be blind, as Bun is".

== Play adaptation ==
The novel was adapted into a stage play by Tatty Hennessy, with Lucy Jane Atkinson directing the production. It premiered at the Watermill Theatre in Bagnor, Berkshire in 2022. In his review for Drama & Theatre, Alex Thomas wrote "the play is a wonderful platform from which to engage with the world of those who have lost their sight; there is an element of magic, as one would expect from a story interwoven with the Arthurian legend, but this element is very much downplayed". Anya Ryan from The Guardian, remarked how "the production is an inclusive scrapbook of wonder; there are surtitles, audio explanations built into the narrative and facts about blindness to educate us". She summed up her review by stating, "Aarian Mehrabani's portrayal of Bun veers towards monotonous, which makes finding the soul of his tale tricky, and Bun's final resolution arrives abruptly, without the emotional build up to warrant such a drastic change of heart".

== See also ==
- Historicity of King Arthur
- List of works based on Arthurian legends
