= An Elephant in the Garden =

2010 British children's novel

- First edition cover
- Author: Michael Morpurgo
- Illustrator: Michael Foreman
- Language: English
- Genre: Children's novel
- Publisher: HarperCollins
- Publication date: 27 May 2010
- Publication place: United Kingdom
- Media type: Print
- Pages: 240
- ISBN: 978-0-00-787601-3 Hardback
- OCLC: 704728471

An Elephant in the Garden is a British children's novel written by Michael Morpurgo, and illustrated by Michael Foreman. It was originally published in the United Kingdom by HarperCollins, and released in May 2010. The book is based on actual events that took place in Belfast during World War II, and is inspired by the story of Denise Weston Austin. The novel was also adapted into a stage play with the same name, that had its debut in 2014 in the United Kingdom.

== Plot ==
The novel begins with nine-year-old Karl going to visit his mother, who works at a nursing home. He meets a patient named Lizzie who proceeds to tell him a story that took place when she was younger, in 1945, during World War II. Lizzie tells Karl how she was living in Dresden, Germany with her younger brother Karli, and her mother during the war. Her mother Mutti, works at the local zoo, and one day she learns from the head zookeeper that some of the animals will have to be shot if and when the bombers arrive. This will prevent the animals from escaping and roaming the city. Mutti becomes distressed after hearing this, and decides to take home one of her favorite animals, an elephant named Marlene. Sadly, the day arrives when the bombs start falling on the city, which forces Lizzie and her family to leave the city. They head out towards a relatives house, and upon arriving, find that their relatives are gone, and instead, find a man who appears to be a soldier hiding out in the house.

The man identifies himself as Peter, a Canadian soldier who took refuge in the house after his plane was shot down. Since the area is not safe, they all head out looking for American troops, who they trust will provide them protection. Along the way, Karli becomes sick, so they seek shelter in order for Karli to recover. However, the shelters co-owners are suspicious of Peter after discovering a compass he has is American made, so they call the German police who arrive to interrogate Peter. After the police accept a bribe in the form of cash, they leave, and the group once again continue on their journey; now with a children's choir accompanying them, because their headmaster has been killed.

When they finally reach the American troops, Marlene is frightened by all the noise of the artillery and guns the troops are using, and runs off. Lizzie and her family search for months on end, but they are unable to find Marlene. As time goes by, Peter and Lizzie eventually get married. One day when the couple visits the circus, they discover that the elephant performing in the circus is in fact Marlene. They decide the circus is the best place for her, and leave her be, as Lizzie finishes her story. However, as Karl prepares to leave, Lizzie senses that Karl is skeptical of the story she has just told, so she gives Karl one of her prized souvenirs as proof of her adventure.

== Historical background ==
Denise Weston Austin, colloquially known as the 'Elephant Angel', was a Northern Irish zookeeper known for keeping Sheila, an elephant calf from the Belfast Zoo, in her backyard during World War II. During the Belfast Blitz in April 1941, the Ministry of Public Security told the Royal Ulster Constabulary to shoot and kill thirty-three large animals due to concerns that the German bombings may break their cages and release them into the city. In order to prevent Sheila, a young African elephant, from being killed in this manner, Austin walked the elephant to her house on Whitewell Road every day after work.

I'm very big on trying to personalise history, the thing is, if you care about the characters in a book, then you feel for their plight; you comprehend, you empathise.

— Michael Morpurgo

Morpurgo said he first learned of the real life story of Austin, when his wife woke him up in the middle of the night to listen to a radio programme on BBC, which was discussing Austin and her story. The next day, he researched the story and found it to be accurate, and also discovered the true story of a school choir; abandoned after their choir leader had been killed. Thinking it was a great idea for a story, Morpurgo changed the location from Belfast to Dresden, who incidentally, also had the same kill order for zoo animals. He also transformed Austin into a fictional mother-of-two, and renamed the elephant from Sheila to Marlene. He also noted how he has been criticised for writing children's books about war, but he argues that "it's only relatively recently that we've emerged from that long, dark tunnel of Europe being torn apart by war after war, and we forget it at our peril".

== Release ==
The children's novel was originally published in the United Kingdom by HarperCollins, and released in May 2010. It was published in the United States in 2011, by Feiwel & Friends, an imprint of Macmillan Children's Publishing Group.

== Reviews ==
English writer and illustrator Mal Peet gave the book a glowing review, stating the book is "brightly and informatively jacketed, its text punctuated by lovely, fluid ink and wash illustrations by Michael Foreman, it deserves a prominent place on school library bookshelves and, if there is any justice in the world, in bookshops". Julia Parker from the Historical Novel Society noted how "the hardships suffered by the people at that time are described convincingly". Gerry Larson from the School Library Journal stated that "this well-paced, heartwarming narrative by a master storyteller will appeal to readers on several levels – as a tale of adventure and suspense, as a commentary on human trauma and animal welfare during war, as a perspective on the hardships facing the German people in the final months of World War II, and as a tribute to the rich memories and experiences of an older generation".

Kirkus Reviews was lukewarm in their review, writing that "while the present-day setting gives Morpurgo the opportunity to tie up loose ends, it ultimately distracts from the important, dismal reality of the war story and the plight of the refugees and animals. A moving but somewhat flawed tale of human-and animal-courage in the face of tragic suffering. Ron Marinucci from the Library Media Connection thought "the novel is easy-to-read, fast-paced, and interesting, and it's not too far-fetched, being loosely based on real historical episodes". Jeanette Hulick said in her review for The Bulletin of the Center for Children's Books that "while both the narrative framework and the events events are a bit contrived at times, readers compelled by the straightforward 'you are there' storytelling and dramatic events will hardly give that a thought. Young Lizzie’s story is quick-paced and moving, and her teenage viewpoint is believable as she falls for Peter and also tries to make sense of the wartime actions of the adults around her".

Voice of Youth Advocates's Deborah Cooper wrote that "Morpurgo's understated style slowly but steadily draws the reader in, and while daily hardships and the actual bombing of Dresden are recounted in some detail, the story is never harrowing". She summed up her review opining that "librarians and educators alike will welcome this semi-factual historical title as a valuable teaching aide on the subject of war. The story ends positively and will inspire thoughtful discussion about war's impact, as well as the accompanying themes of friendship, trust, and perseverance". Jo Goodman of Reading Time said "there is no attempt to colour the tale with fancy language and the storyline is simple. The plot is sufficient to hold readers captivated as they wonder what will happen to the elephant and how the human characters will survive the horrors of war".

== Play adaption ==
Ratings
Review scores
Source	Rating
The Daily Telegraph	3/5 stars
The Observer	4/5 stars
The Stage	4/5 stars

The children's novel was adapted by Simon Reade into a stage play, with Reade also directing. It was a one-woman show with all the parts played by Alison Reid. The play premiered in Morpurgo's hometown of Exeter at the Northcott Theatre in October 2014.

Clare Brennan of The Observer said "the form of the production is itself a further affirmation of our potential for transformation". She complimented the set design, lighting and sound design for making the one woman show by Reid a success. She opined that "we hear, through speakers, music, voices, singing, the roaring of fire, the drone of planes, the whine of bombs", which all highlight Reid's performance. She also noted that "Reid's transitions from one character to another seemed, sometimes, blurred at the edges, but her evocation through movement of Marlene's walk and waving ears is uncanny".

Dominic Cavendish of The Daily Telegraph was a little more reserved in his review, stating that "while a German-accented, dungaree-wearing Alison Reid, playing 28 roles in 60 minutes, is very good at giving subtle shape to the beast with bowed body, lumbering gait, and swaying trunk of arms, we're a long way from the magic of Handspring’s puppetry at the National Theatre". He did note that the set design "at least, does what little it can to insinuate an elephant in the room, via the suggestive shapes of a ruined grey wall".
