= Little Manfred =

2011 British children's novel

- Author: Michael Morpurgo
- Working title: It's All Over Now
- Illustrator: Michael Foreman
- Language: English
- Genre: Children's literature
- Set in: 1966 & World War II
- Publisher: HarperCollins
- Publication date: 2011
- Publication place: Great Britain
- Pages: 170
- ISBN: 978-0-00-733966-2
- OCLC: 712125317

Little Manfred is a British children's novel written by Michael Morpurgo, and illustrated by Michael Foreman. It was originally published in Great Britain by HarperCollins in 2011. The novel is primarily set in two time periods, 1966 and World War II, and was published in partnership with the Imperial War Museum, to accompany the museum's "Once Upon a Wartime" exhibition. The book is inspired by the true stories of the last battle of Bismarck, a little brown wooden dachshund carved by two prisoners of war, and the 1966 World Cup.

== Plot ==
The story starts out in 1966, following England winning the World Cup against Germany. The narrator of the story is twelve-year-old Charley. She lives nearby on a farm on the south coast of England with her mum and dad, and seven-year-old brother Alex. Since they live just a short distance from the sea, one of Charley's favorite pastimes is going to the beach, mostly to avoid doing chores on the farm. Alex always tags along when she goes to the beach; and their black and white sheepdog named Manfred, nicknamed Mannie, accompanies them as well. Mannie is named after a toy that their mum cherished when she was little, a wooden dachshund painted brown with red wheels, named "Little Manfred".

On one of their excursions to the beach, while Alex is goofing off, imitating Geoff Hurst and Nobby Stiles from their recent victory at the World Cup, they meet two old men, Walter and Marty. The children overhear the men's conversation, talking about how "it was about here that it happened". One of the men happens to throw a pebble into the sea, and Mannie takes off in a flash after it. Charley starts yelling at Mannie to come back, and when the men hear the name of the dog, they approach the children. After quizzing the children further about where they live, one of the men says he knows where they live, and also knows their mother. So the man named Walter starts to tell the children about his friend named Manfred, and how he came to know about their farm, and Grace, their mother. Walter tells the children, that he and Manfred were sailors on the same ship together, the Bismarck, when it was attacked by the British, and the two-thousand men aboard were ordered to abandon ship, and some of them were eventually rescued by the HMS Dorsetshire, of which Marty was a crew member. Walter says that as he and Manfred lay on the deck of the ship, they hear the captain give the order to leave right away due to U-boats in the area, and the rest of their crew, nearly two-thousand men, are left to drown.

Walter tells the children that when the men who were rescued arrive in England, they are now prisoners of war, and then after six years of being imprisoned in a camp, him and Manfred are let out of the camp and are relocated to a farm with Mr. and Mrs. Williams, and their young daughter Grace. Walter tells the children how his friend Manfred grew close to little Grace, and when the news arrived they would be going home, Manfred decided he would make a present for Grace, a little dachshund dog carved out of wood, that Walter ended up painting. Walter said the present would be like a "dog of peace". On their last day at the beach, Manfred picked up a pebble to throw in the sea, and unexpectedly hit a mine that killed him. The next evening Walter gave the toy dog to Grace, who decided to call it "Little Manfred", and promised to keep it forever.

After hearing the story, Alex invites the men back to their farm. When they arrive, their mum comes out, and Walter says "Grace? It is me Walter, you remember?" And she replies that she does of course remember him, then turns to Walter and throws her arms around him, and hugs him. They go into the house, and Grace retrieves "Little Manfred" to show Walter, and smiles as she tells him that she has kept him like she promised all these years.

Twenty-five years go by, Walter has died, but Charley is reunited with Marty in London, where they go to the Imperial War Museum to present Little Manfred as a gift to be put on display.

== Background ==
External image
- via Imperial War Museum
- Pull-along toy dog

Michael Foreman, a longtime collaborator of Morpurgos, explains the origins of the story. He said they had already decided the subject of the book would be about prisoners of war in Great Britain, and had mentioned this to the staff at the Imperial War Museum, before arriving for a scheduled meeting. Upon arrival, they found that the curators had placed on a table, "a wooden dog with red wheels; the dog's body was articulated so it wiggled and waggled when pulled along by a bit of string". They were told it had been made by a German POW for a girl on the farm where the prisoners worked. After hearing the curators desire for the book to be related to something in their collection, Foreman recalls Morpurgo giving him one of his "looks", so the decision was made that the little dog would be the "star of the book". Morpurgo said he thought the toy dog was a "rather wonderful symbol of friendship; instead of a dog of war, this was a dog of peace".

I come across a subject and just feel I must write it.

— Michael Morpurgo

Another inspiration for the story came from a patron who was attending one of Morpurgo's book signings, and told him the story of how he was a sailor on the HMS Dorsetshire, one of the ships that finished off the German battleship Bismarck in 1941. According to the sailor, the Dorsetshire cruised over to where the 2000 survivors were swimming in the water, and the crew let down rope ladders so they could climb aboard the warship, and after a couple of hundred made it aboard, they were ordered to leave because there were U-boats in the vicinity. Morpurgo recalls the old man had "tears rolling down his face", as he finished the story and said: "I stood there and I watched the nearly 2000 men and women in the water and we left them. I just have never been able to forget the sight and the sound of it". Morpurgo said he thought to himself, "this is something that needs telling", and that's basically what he did with the book.

== Release ==
The book was originally published in Great Britain by HarperCollins in 2011. The audiobook was released the same year and was narrated by Daniel Philpott. British journalist Sue Gaisford said it is "compelling and touching, and carries an important message about tolerance and understanding".

== Reception ==
Toby Clements wrote in The Daily Telegraph that Morpurgo "links the sinking of the Bismarck, the 1966 World Cup and a wooden dog called Little Manfred into a startlingly affecting and effective concoction; he really is the master at this sort of thing; not a word is wasted". Elspeth Scott of School Librarian said Morpurgo "is not content with an easy feel-good story but also highlights the horrors of war, showing the effects on both sides but also showing how these shared experiences bring together combatants from opposite sides of the conflict; as always, much is implied rather than stated; and Foreman's watercolour illustrations are a perfect counterpoint to the text". Amanda Craig of The Times said the novel is a "gentle good-hearted tale about finding friends even in war; it's soothing".

In his review for South China Morning Post, John Millen wrote that it is the "simplest of stories, but it delves deep into the themes of nostalgia, friendship and the nature of war; Morpurgo is experienced enough to keep the tale on the right side of sentimentality, and he is helped by the artwork of illustrator Michael Foreman, whose watercolour sketches enhance the power of the book". Gemma Ramsamy of The Observer stated the novel is an "intrepid seafaring tale, and Morpurgo is a virtuoso at conjuring vibrant stories that draw on historical events". Nicola Smyth wrote in The Independent that "Foreman's illustrations, like Morpurgo's prose, manage to unite a dog on the beach, a football match and the sinking of 1,400 men, all in the space of a few pages – a true classic". Trevor Agnew wrote in The Press that the novel has a "strong plot, interesting characters and illustrations that illuminate the story; only Morpurgo could spin such a heart-warming story around a small wooden dog, also named Manfred".

== Play adaptation ==
In 2022, the book was adapted for stage by Alnwick Playhouse director Damian Cruden and the Soldiers Arts Academy creative director, Amanda Faber. The play was co-directed by Cruden and Tom Bellerby, and premiered in October at the Polka Theatre in Wimbledon. The show then had a limited run in February 2023, at The Alnwick Playhouse in Northumberland. The cast for the production included veterans and active military personnel and their family members.
