= Bryher Woman =

1st-century BC woman buried in Isles of Scilly

The Bryher Woman was a celtic iron-age woman whose cist grave, containing a mirror and a sword, was discovered on Bryher, Isles of Scilly, in 1999. In 2023, scientists announced that analysis of the tooth fragments showed her to be female.

== Discovery ==
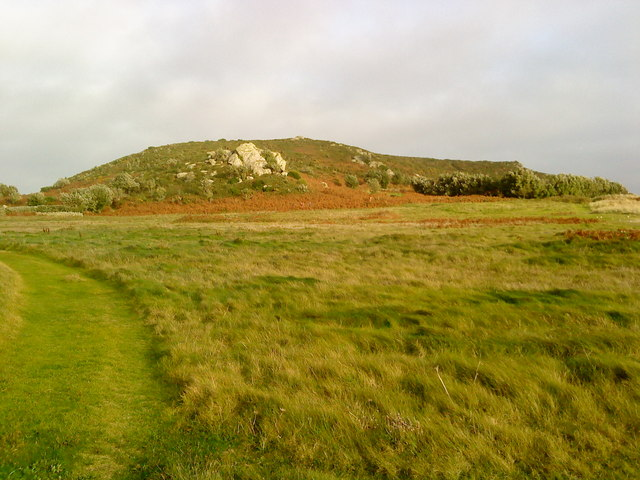
The cist was found on the slopes of Samson Hill in southern Bryher.

The grave was discovered by a farmer working in a potato-field at Hillside Farm on Bryher in March 1999, when his tractor wheel sank into the ground and to free it he moved a large stone which revealed the cist. He reached into the cavity and found a sword. He contacted the British Museum who advised him to take it to the Isles of Scilly Museum, where it was identified as a La Tène II iron sword. The then Prince Charles visited the farm while on a visit to the islands in May 1999, and a project for the evaluation, recording and reinstatement of the site was undertaken jointly by Cornwall Archaeology Unit, English Heritage and the British Museum.

== Finds ==
The body was identified as that of a person aged about 25 years, who had died in the first half of the 1st century BC.

In addition to the sword in its bronze scabbard, a bronze mirror was found, and other grave goods included shield fittings, a sword belt ring, a brooch and a spiral ring (all of copper alloy), and a shattered tin object. All items were of classic celtic design. "There was also evidence for the grave having contained a sheepskin or fleece and woven textile incorporating goat and other animal hairs."

The mirror and sword, after conservation, were given to the Isles of Scilly Museum, and as of 2023 are displayed in the museum's visitor centre in the town hall on St Mary's after the closure of the museum's building.

== Sex identification ==
The 2002 report on the grave had reported that "This is the only known Iron Age grave to contain both a sword and mirror, raising interesting questions as to the gender significance of both these grave goods", but that "preservation of bone and DNA was too poor to determine the person's sex".

A 2016 paper said that "Their combined presence within the burial of a single individual represents a touchstone within the ongoing unraveling of a long-held, interconnected set of reified sex and gender assumptions that have permeated discussions of British Iron Age mortuary contexts" and that "Hillside Farm as a starting point highlights the need to keep in mind the potential significance of any aspect of the burial, not to deny that men and women may have existed, or that certain artifacts may have conveyed a gendered meaning, but to refrain from excluding other routes to identity, personhood, or significance before analysis begins."

In 2023, American scientists used new techniques of analysis of dental peptides, which indicated that, with 96% probability, the person in the grave was female.

== In literature ==
Michael Morpurgo's children's book The Sleeping Sword (2002, ISBN 978-0749748524) was inspired by the discovery of the sword on Bryher, combining it with Arthurian legend. He dedicated the book to the people of Bryher, where he has spent many holidays.
