= City of Gold (book) =

1980 children's book by Peter Dickinson

- Front cover of 1980 hardcover edition
- Author: Peter Dickinson
- Illustrator: Michael Foreman
- Language: English
- Genre: Short stories, Bible stories
- Publisher: Victor Gollancz Ltd
- Publication date: 1980
- Publication place: United Kingdom
- Media type: Print (hardback & paperback)
- Pages: 188 pp (first edition) including bibliography
- ISBN: 0575028831
- OCLC: 472787135
- Dewey Decimal: 221.9/505
- LC Class: BS551.2 .D47 1980

City of Gold and other stories from the Old Testament is a collection of 33 Old Testament Bible stories retold for children by Peter Dickinson, illustrated by Michael Foreman, and published by Victor Gollancz Ltd in 1980. The British Library Association awarded Dickinson his second Carnegie Medal recognising the year's outstanding children's book by a British subject (Note: No one has won three Carnegie Medals. Dickinson became the first of seven authors to win two, as of 2012, having won the preceding year for Tulku (Gollancz, 1979). Repeat winners were not permitted for many years.) and highly commended Foreman for the companion Kate Greenaway Medal. (Note: Today there are usually eight books on the Greenaway Medal shortlist. According to CCSU, there were 31 "Highly Commended" runners up in 29 years from 1974 to 2002, including Foreman alone in 1980. • For more than fifty years (1955–2010 publications) no author and illustrator of one book won both of the annual CILIP children's book awards — until June 2012 when both Patrick Ness and Jim Kay were recognised for A Monster Calls (2011).)

City of Gold is a "radical" retelling of Bible stories, according to the retrospective online Carnegie Medal citation. "It is set in a time before the Bible was written down, when its stories were handed from generation to generation by the spoken word."

U.S. editions by Pantheon Books (New York, 1980) and Otter Books (Boston, 1992) retained Foreman's illustrations.

== Origin ==
Dickinson described the origin and development of particular story books to the Children's Literature Association when he received the retrospective Phoenix Award for Eva in 2008. With City of Gold, for instance, he was "asked to re-tell the stories of the Old Testament, which I did in the different voices of different people telling the stories for specific purposes while they still existed only in the oral tradition." The request and its deliberate fulfillment place the book near the "commissioned" end of the spectrum. Some others "begin with only what you might call the idea of an idea, a hunch, that there might be a book in them thar hills".

His editor Joanna Goldsworthy at Gollancz made the request, he recalls, for a series of retellings illustrated by Foreman in which fairy tales by Hans Christian Andersen and folk tales collected by the Brothers Grimm had already been done. (Note: Gollancz had published Hans Anderson: his classic fairy tales in 1976 and Popular Folk Tales, newly translated from Brothers Grimm by Brian Alderson, in 1978. Foreman had been a Greenaway "Commended" runner up for the latter and he finally won the British children's book illustration medal for Sleeping Beauty and other favourite fairy tales, selected and translated from Perrault and LePrince de Beaumont by Angela Carter, published by Gollancz in 1982.) He declined and argued against the project, because there is no voice today for such retelling and because of the sharp contrast between stories "for amusement with glossy illustrations" and stories still "part of many people's deeply held convictions". But he found the multiple "imagined voices of people who had passionately believed in them." He acknowledges Rudyard Kipling for the technique.

== Reception ==
Some librarians criticised the Carnegie award to Dickinson, wondering in the pages of the contemporary Literary Association Record why the panel of Library Association judges so often chose books that no "ordinary" child would read. Panelist Vivian Griffiths responded that popularity with children was not a criterion; the point was literary merit.

== Notes ==
Awards
| Preceded by Tulku | Carnegie Medal recipient 1980 | Succeeded by The Scarecrows |
