= Billy the Kid (novel) =

1997 British children's novel

- First edition
- Author: Michael Morpurgo
- Illustrator: Michael Foreman
- Language: English
- Genre: Children's literature
- Publisher: Pavilion Books
- Publication date: 2000
- Publication place: United Kingdom
- Pages: 71
- ISBN: 978-1-86205-361-8
- OCLC: 44057853

Billy the Kid is a British children's novel written by Michael Morpurgo, and illustrated by Michael Foreman. It was originally published by Pavilion Books in 2000. Like many of his other novels, it was adapted into a stage play. In 2016, a multi-sensory sculpture of Billy the Kid was put on display at Seven Stories, where Morpurgo had previously donated all of his manuscripts.

== Plot summary ==
Billy, an 80-year-old Chelsea Pensioner, looks back on his life. As a boy he loved football and was chosen to play for Chelsea Football Club. His youthful brilliance earned him the nickname of "Billy the Kid". Then his life was interrupted by the start of the Second World War and Billy joined the army. During the book Billy's father and brother both die; he falls in love with a girl who, like her mother, is killed by the Germans; he gets injured when he drives an ambulance over a landmine; and he goes home to find the rest of his family have been killed by a bomb.

He became a vagrant but was later befriended by a family and encouraged their son Sam to play football. Sam grew up to play for Chelsea just like Billy did.

== Release ==
The novel had its original publication in the United Kingdom by Pavilion Books in 2000. An audiobook narrated by English actor Richard Attenborough was released in 2002. Carole Mansur from The Daily Telegraph opined that Attenborough was a wise choice to narrate a "vintage lump-in-the-throat Morpurgo tale for seven-year-olds and up".

== Reviews ==
Alison Davison of the Birmingham Post wrote "it's a poignant, nostalgic and moving tale of a sad, though ultimately uplifting, life; although the narrative is perhaps slightly over-packed with huge incidents and historical markers, Morpurgo keeps genuine poignancy alive; the author's warm humanity shines throughout". John Clare from The Daily Telegraph remarked that "the English teacher who wants to encourage her soccer-mad boys to read should introduce them to Billy the Kid".

In her review for the Financial Times, Anne Marley stated that "Billy narrates his own story; and the deceptively simple narrative style conveys hope and despair, love and hate, and finally peace; entirely convincing in its characterisation, the satisfying, thoughtful and ultimately heart-warming story never shirks from describing the reality of the characters' situation". Cliff Moore wrote in the Dorset Echo that any book dedicated to the wonderful Gianfranco Zola must have something going for it, and this is no exception; this may be a children's title, but Billy's story deals with real issues such as homelessness, war, alcoholism, friendship and the power of sport is right for any age".

== Play adaptation ==
Sam is a know-it-all teenager who dreams of the celebrity and big wage packets of professional football. Billy is a broken-down man who has actually played for Chelsea. Billy can teach Sam a thing or two, if only the lad would listen.

In 2007, it was adapted into a stage play by Tony Graham, who also directed the play. It featured Dudley Sutton as Billy, and Sam Donovan as Sam. It premiered on 18 May 2007 at the Unicorn Theatre, a children's theatre in the London Borough of Southwark. Graham's adaptation won Time Out's Family Show of the Year in 2007. In 2011, a revival of the play at the Unicorn Theatre was filmed and distributed by Digital Theatre.

In his review for the Evening Standard, Michael Holland wrote that "engaging as the two-hander is, it could afford to linger longer over its emotional highlights, as Dudley Sutton's satisfyingly complex old man Billy reminisces about his eventful early life to brash teenager Sam". British theatre critic Lyn Gardner said "this is a softly spoken play that doesn't thump its messages home, more reflective than rowdy as past and present, young and old rub together and create friction; it boasts two wonderfully fresh performances from Sam Donovan as the youngster and Dudley Sutton as the grumpy old codger whose ears still ring with the roar of the crowd".
