= Tulku (novel) =

1979 children's historical novel by Peter Dickinson

- First edition (UK)
- Author: Peter Dickinson
- Cover artist: Tudor Humphries
- Language: English
- Genre: Children's historical novel, adventure novel
- Publisher: Victor Gollancz Ltd (UK); E. P. Dutton (US)
- Publication date: 22 February 1979
- Publication place: United Kingdom
- Media type: Print (hardcover, paperback)
- Pages: 286 pp (first edition)
- ISBN: 0-575-02503-4
- OCLC: 731246577
- LC Class: PZ7.D562 Tu 1979

Tulku is a children's historical novel by Peter Dickinson, published by Gollancz in 1979. Set in China and Tibet at the time of the Boxer Rebellion (1899 – 1901), it features a young teenage boy orphaned by the violence, who flees with others to a Buddhist monastery. Dickinson and Tulku won two major awards for British children's books, the Whitbread Children's Book Award and the Carnegie Medal. The Carnegie Medal from the Library Association then recognised the year's outstanding children's book by a British subject.

Dutton published a U.S. edition within the calendar year under its Unicorn imprint.

== Plot summary ==
Thirteen-year-old Theodore lives in a remote region of China at his father's mission. When the violence of the Boxer Rebellion finally reaches them, Theodore escapes alone from its destruction. He soon becomes one companion of a formidable Englishwoman, "painted, blasphemous, gun-toting Mrs Jones". She is an amateur botanist and a former actress with an entourage.

The party flees bandits into Tibet and take refuge at a Tibetan Buddhist monastery. Theodore is briefly seen to be the tulku, a great lama reincarnated; then the recently conceived child of Mrs Jones and her Chinese lover is identified as the one. Theodore is exposed to the "magnetic, repugnant rituals of Buddhism" and develops as a "whole, willing Christian". Mrs Jones is recruited to remain on site and the boy finally returns to England with the fruit of her botanical expedition.

== Themes ==
The themes of Tulku are the intertwining of religion and politics, the nature of personal belief, and how far belief can coexist with cynicism. Thus it is similar to Dickinson's earlier novel The Blue Hawk (Gollancz, 1977), for which he won the once-in-a-lifetime Guardian Children's Fiction Prize.

== See also ==
Tibetan Buddhism

Awards
Preceded by The Exeter Blitz	Carnegie Medal recipient 1979	Succeeded by City of Gold
