= A Box of Nothing =

1985 novel

A Box of Nothing is a novel by Peter Dickinson published in 1985.

== Plot summary ==
A Box of Nothing is a novel in which a youngster acquires a box containing the original nothingness that existed before the beginning of the universe.

== Reception ==
Dave Langford reviewed A Box of Nothing for White Dwarf #66, and stated that "Somewhere in the entropic desert a new universe is gestating, and there's a race to ensure it's the right kind of universe. . . Amiable and batty."

== Reviews ==
- Children's Literature Review
