= Philippa Dickinson =

British publisher (born 1955)

- Occupation: editor
- Relatives: Peter Dickinson; John Dickinson

Philippa Dickinson is a former editor for Puffin Books, and chair of Random House Children's Publishing. During her time at Puffin, she was the editor of The Warlock of Firetop Mountain, and also acted for a time as the desk editor of Warlock magazine.

== Early life ==
Philippa Dickinson was born in 1955. Her father was the novelist Peter Dickinson, and her mother was Mary Rose Barnard. She was educated at the then grammar school (now a private school) Godolphin and Latymer School in Hammersmith in London. She has two brothers, of whom one is the children's writer John Dickinson, and one sister.

== Career ==
=== Puffin and Fighting Fantasy ===
In 1974 Dickinson joined Puffin Books, working for Kaye Webb in the Puffin Club. She started there as a teenager and was persuaded to stay on rather than going to university. She spent five years at the Puffin Club before moving to the editorial department.

At Puffin in 1981/1982 Dickinson was asked to edit a book called The Warlock of Firetop Mountain. Having received the first completed manuscript, it was Dickinson who "diplomatically highlighted various inconsistencies" to its two authors Ian Livingstone and Steve Jackson. She noted that the two halves of the book were inconsistent (a product of having been written separately by Jackson and Livingstone) and that this included apparent differences in the rules. For example, the attributes for fighting ability, constitution and fitness, and luck were labeled by Jackson "Skill", "Stamina" and "Luck", and by Livingstone, "Combat Factor", "Strength Factor" and "Luck Factor". Also there were differences in how these were determined. Dickinson made observations on the text, such as pointing out that the way in which choices were presented was inconsistent, and noting that the use of the terms Werewolf and Wolfman were inconsistent. She pushed for the writing style to be aligned; it was obvious that there had been a change in writer half way through, and so at her prompting one of the writers rewrote the other's half.

Dickinson was the commissioning editor for the next two Fighting Fantasy books.

For the first five issues of Warlock Magazine, she also acted as desk editor, until Games Workshop took over the magazine from Penguin Books.

She eventually became deputy head of publishing at Puffin Books and left in 1986.

=== Transworld to Random House ===
In 1986 she joined Transworld and became the editorial director of Corgi Children's list. In March 1998, the media giant Bertelsmann, who were the owners of Transworld, acquired Random House. This led to the children's lists of Transworld and Random House being merged. At that time Dickinson was publisher of Transworld Children's Books and chair of the Publishers Association Children's Book Group. Debbie Sandford, the managing director of Random House Children's Publishing, resigned and Dickinson was made chairman of Random House Children's Publishing.

The new role of chairman of Random House Children's Publishing meant she would not become involved with day-to-day business at Random House, but as chairman, she had responsibility for both Random House Children's Books and Transworld Children's Books. She made it clear that the two companies would continue to operate separately.

In 2014, Dickinson was Consultant Children's Publisher at Penguin Random House.

In 2006, Dickinson was asked to be the vice-chairman of World Book Day.

== Books ==
- Micro Games (1983), Puffin Books, with Patrick Bossert
