= Denise Weston Austin =

Northern Irish zookeeper

- Born: 17 December 1925; Northern Ireland
- Died: 17 July 1997 (aged 71–72)
- Occupation: Zookeeper
- Employer: Belfast Zoo

Denise Weston Austin (1925–1997), colloquially known as the Elephant Angel, was a Northern Irish zookeeper known for keeping Sheila, an elephant calf from the Belfast Zoo, in her backyard during World War II. She was also known for being the first female zookeeper to work at the Belfast Zoo.

== Biography ==
Denise Weston Austin was born in 1925 in Northern Ireland to Irene Beatrice Mary Austin (nee Ingram) and Jack Austin, the latter of which was an officer in the Indian cavalry.

During the Belfast Blitz in April 1941, the Ministry of Public Security told the Royal Ulster Constabulary to shoot and kill thirty-three large animals due to concerns that the German bombings may break their cages and release them into the city. In order to prevent Sheila, a young African elephant, from being killed in this manner, Austin walked the elephant to her house on Whitewell Road every day after work.

The other employees at the zoo were unaware of Austin’s activities until Sheila ran into a neighbour’s garden while chasing a dog, breaking the fence in the process. The neighbour reported the incident to Dick Foster, the zoo's head zookeeper, who took the elephant back to the zoo.

Sheila survived the war, living at the zoo for 25 more years until her death in 1966. Austin herself died in 1997.

Austin’s identity as the Elephant Angel remained unknown to the public until 2009, when the Belfast Zoo launched an investigation as a way to celebrate its 75th anniversary. She was finally identified from an old photograph of Sheila drinking water from a bucket in someone's backyard. Denise was cremated and her ashes are buried alongside her mother at Ardess Parish Church new graveyard southwest of her mothers home village of Ederney, County Fermanagh. A soap stone elephant was placed on her headstone as an appreciation of her actions during World War 2 at Belfast Zoo.

== In popular culture ==
British children’s author Michael Morpurgo loosely based his 2011 novel An Elephant in the Garden on Austin’s story after hearing about her on the radio.

Denise Weston Austin also inspired the 2017 film Zoo, written and directed by Colin McIvor; many parts of the movie were also filmed in Belfast, namely on Union Street, Little Donegall Street, and at the Belfast Zoo itself.

The 2021 novel The Elephant of Belfast: A Novel by S. Kirk Walsh was also inspired by Austin's actions to look after the elephant during WWII.

The 2023 children's book The Secret Elephant, written and illustrated by Ellan Rankin, was based upon Austin's story. Published by Hachette Children's Group, the book tells the story of the keeper bringing baby Sheila into her home each night and the escapades which ensued. Rankin is also Belfast based.
