= Fairy Tales (Jones book) =

- First edition
- Author: Terry Jones
- Illustrator: Michael Foreman
- Language: English
- Genre: Children's literature
- Publisher: Pavilion Books
- Publication date: 1981
- Publication place: England
- Pages: 127
- ISBN: 978-0-907516-03-3
- OCLC: 16549141

Fairy Tales is a 1981 book of children's stories written by Monty Python's Terry Jones and illustrated by Michael Foreman with both ink drawings and watercolour paintings.

The book tells an assortment of short fantasy tales, such as "Simple Peter", about a boy with a mirror that shows you as others see you, and the tale of a little girl who is offered the chance to take a magical trip to Goblin City, but spends so long fretting about the trip that eventually the friendly goblin who made the offer takes it back.

The tales are told with an irreverent voice and comic nonsense. At one point the stars are heard to sing, "Boodle-dum dee, boodle-dum dar, isn't it fun, being a star?" To which the moon answers, "I'm just the moon, but that's fine by me, so long as I hear that boodle-dum dee!" Some of the dialogue is surprisingly adult ("That is one hell of a beautiful butterfly", says an admiring frog) and some of the tales end on a rather sad note, but they also feature the old-fashioned lessons and fearsome monsters one would expect of fairy tales.

In April 2009, the book was chosen by Children's Laureate Michael Rosen as one of his five best children's stories of all time.
