= A Medal for Leroy =

2014 British children's novel

- Author: Michael Morpurgo
- Illustrator: Michael Foreman
- Language: English
- Genre: Children's literature
- Publisher: HarperCollins
- Publication date: 2012
- Publication place: Great Britain
- Pages: 212
- ISBN: 978-0-00-792682-4
- OCLC: 1150284447

A Medal for Leroy is a British children's novel written by Michael Morpurgo, and illustrated by Michael Foreman. It was originally published in Great Britain by HarperCollins in September 2012. The inspiration behind the novel is Walter Tull, Britain's first black Army officer to lead white British troops into battle. The novel explores the relationships between identity, nation, race and history.

== Synopsis ==
Michael, who is nine-year-old and lives in London with his mother, is the narrator of the story. He never knew his father, as he had been killed in the war, and knows even less about this grandfather Leroy. He also had two aunts, named Auntie Pish and Auntie Snowdrop, who had a Jack Russell Terrier named Jasper. His Auntie Snowdrop died when he was nine, and five years later, Auntie Pish got pneumonia and had to be put in a nursing home, so Jasper came to live with him. He also received a belated parcel from Auntie Snowdrop which contained a photograph of his father, which he proudly displayed on his desk in his bedroom.

One day Jasper jumped onto his desk and knocked the photograph over, breaking the glass. Michael then discovered hidden behind the cardboard of the picture, was a writing pad with Basildon Bond embossed on the front, and underneath was written:

Who I am, what I've done, and who you are, by Martha Mahoney (Auntie Snowdrop), for Michael, so he'll know, for his eyes only, written in May 1950.

As he began to read the writing pad, a funny feeling crept over him, and he knew that after he read what his auntie had written, he would never be the same person again. What he discovers is that his auntie is really his grandmother, and is the mother of his father Roy. She tells the story of how she met his grandfather Leroy Hamilton in World War I, and started dating him. He learns that his grandfather was a football player before he joined the army, and he was killed in action in Belgium, and soon after his death, she finds out she is pregnant with his father Roy, and ends up raising him alone as an unwed mother. Michael also discovers that his father Roy, at the age of nineteen, joined the British military, and became a pilot for the Royal Air Force, and was stationed in France for a time, which is where he met Christine, his mother, and they were married shortly thereafter. Michael learns that in September 1940, Roy is killed when an engine on his Spitfire failed, and it crashed. As he finishes reading the writing pad, his grandmother wrote: 'You had a grandmother and never knew it. Now you do. Now you know everything. Look after the photo of your father, and tell your children my story, because it's your story and theirs.'

As the years pass, Michael has grown up and is now a father and grandfather as well. One of his granddaughters, who is named Christine, after learning the story of her great-great-grandfather Leroy, says how unfair it was that he never received a medal for his heroic actions in World War I, so her and Michael begin a campaign to get him recognized with an award. So they wrote letter after letter, but never received any response. Many years later, they visit Belgium, the site of where Leroy died, and dug a hole and buried the medal that Michael's father Roy had received so it could be shared with Leroy.

== Background ==
I simply felt more people should know about this remarkable man, that they would be as inspired by him as I was.

— Michael Morpurgo

Morpurgo credits his longtime collaborator Michael Foreman for the idea to write the novel. He explains that Foreman phoned him and asked him if he had ever heard of Walter Tull, and Morpurgo replied no, that he had not. After a brief introduction about Tull by Foreman, Morpurgo says the idea for a novel had been planted. He recalls that he was reluctant at first to write another book about World War I, since he had already written so many about the first world war; he also had concerns about authoring a book "too closely associated with the historical life of one man". Morpurgo stated that upon further reflection, he was then inspired to write about Tull's "courage under fire and his heroic death in France"; with the ultimate factor being he wanted Tull to receive the medal he deserved, and to have his statue outside the Imperial War Museum.

=== Walter Tull ===
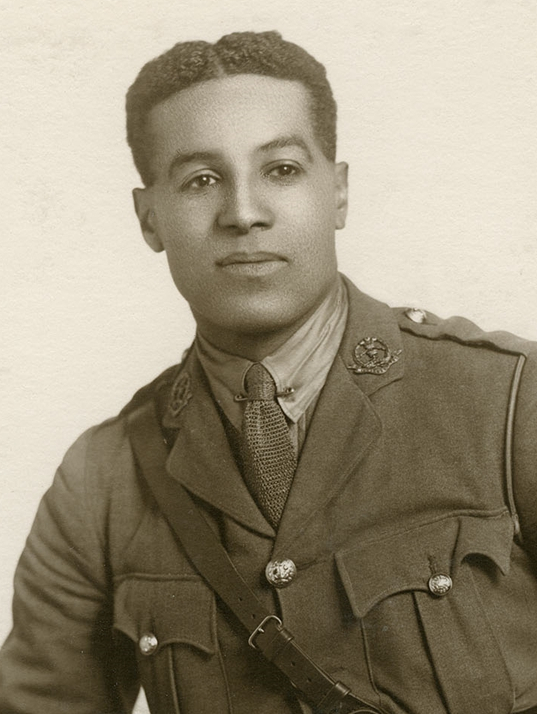
Walter Tull in British army uniform in 1917

Walter Tull was the first British born black army officer, and an English professional footballer, who played as an inside forward and half back for Clapton, Tottenham Hotspur and Northampton Town. After the First World War broke out in August 1914, Tull became the first Northampton Town player to enlist in the British Army. Tull served in the two Football Battalions of the Middlesex Regiment, the 17th and 23rd, and also in the 5th Battalion. He rose to the rank of lance sergeant and fought in the Battle of the Somme in 1916. When Tull was commissioned as a second lieutenant on 30 May 1917, he became the first black infantry officer to lead white British troops into battle. Tull was killed in action on 25 March 1918 in northern France.

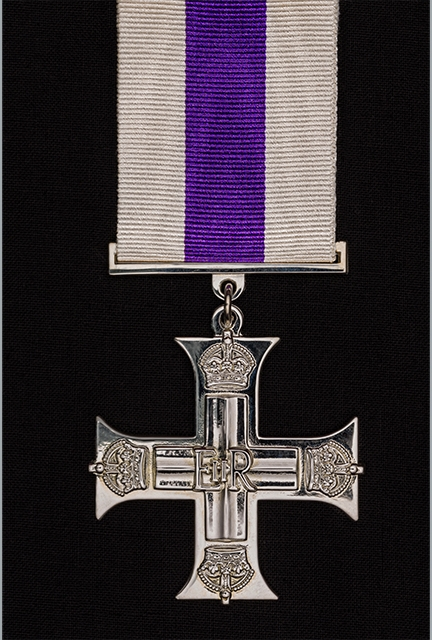
Military Cross

In a letter of condolence to his family, the commanding officer of the 23rd Battalion, Major Poole and his colleague second lieutenant Donald Henry Pickard both said that Tull had been put forward for a Military Cross. Pickard wrote "he had been recommended for the Military Cross, and certainly earned it". However, the Ministry of Defence has no record of any recommendation.

In 2018, David Lammy, then an MP for Tottenham, wrote a letter to prime minister Theresa May and secretary of state for defence Gavin Williamson, requesting that his Military Cross be awarded posthumously to mark the centenary. Lammy's letter was also signed by more than 120 colleagues in the House of Commons. English footballers Dele Alli, Danny Rose and Kieran Trippier, supported Lammy's proposition for him to be recognised as well. As of November 2024, Tull still had not been awarded the Military Cross. MP Lucy Rigby, wrote a letter to Alistair Carns, requesting that Tull be "rightly commemorated", noting in her letter that the campaign to issue the award was "long-running and well-supported".

== Themes and analysis ==
Professor Karen Sands-O'Connor writes in The Lion and the Unicorn, that while A Medal for Leroy is a fictional story based on the life of Walter Tull, the changes Morpurgo chose to make in Tull's life story "further isolate and alienate the Black soldier from British acceptance". She argues that race is used as the reason for the narrative and that it is also "denied as a matter of importance". She says that systemic racism is not seen as having anything to do with denying Tull his rights. She notes that when you do find racism in the story, it is portrayed as "easy to overcome and limited to a few bad people". O'Connor also opines that the novel "highlights race as a factor worthy of historical notice; and then also suggests that racism is of little significance to black people in the past and completely absent in modern-day life.; readers are not required to confront white privilege in their own lives, and never have to wonder if they should do something to ensure that Walter Tull — and others like him — receive the medals they deserve".

In her analysis of the protagonist of the novel, Michael, who is the grandson of Leroy, (the character based on Tull), and the son of a mixed race couple, she states that Michael is seen as an outsider from the very start of the book. O'Connor asserts that when Michael's classmates at school call him "poodle" because of his frizzy black hair; "this racially based teasing" doesn't bother him because, according to Michael, he was "English enough to be acceptable to them, and to feel like one of them". She contends that despite the fact Michael was actually born in England, he isn't really thought about as being truly English, but only 'English enough', because he can be easily identified by sight as being racially different from his white classmates. She claims that the novel "sets up a hierarchy from the beginning where being English is best, and being 'English enough' is something to be desired if being English is unachievable".

== Reception ==
Elizabeth Hawksley from the Historical Novels Review wrote "this book is about family secrets and the cost of keeping them hidden; it's also about the emotional adjustments that must be made when the truth comes out; it is a moving story, sympathetically illustrated by Michael Foreman". Mary Quattlebaum wrote in The Washington Post that "Morpurgo has returned to the war he explored so vividly in his international bestseller War Horse; although slow to start, the quiet, retrospective narration pays off as the protagonist begins to understand the forces that shaped him and his family and take steps to right an injustice". In her review for the School Library Journal, Denise Moore said "even though it's short and simple to read, appealing to reluctant readers, this novel offers readers of all ages a beautiful multilayered story of compassion, loyalty, and courage".

Sharon Hamer from the Library Media Connection said "this short novel might not have enough action to keep the average middle schooler's attention to the end; students will benefit from seeing how racism's reach is international as well as historical, but with only a few pages of action to balance the prose they might not last long enough to get the point". Daniel Kraus wrote in The Booklist, "it's a fine story, even if Leroy's goodness is a bit too perfect to be believed; in fact, the entire book is squeaky-clean, which may make some eyes roll, even while being that warm, gentle read that others savor". Lorna Bradbury of The Daily Telegraph noted that "as ever with Morpurgo, the most lasting relationships are with the animals, in this case a Jack Russell, illustrated by Michael Foreman".

Publishers Weekly opined that "the book addresses important topics directly, including racial prejudice and unwed motherhood; the novel's elegant structure and quiet, retrospective narration — both Michael's and Martha's — bolster this story about the importance of knowing the truth about one's heritage". Reading Time stated "the structure of Morpurgo's story is complex; yet it unfolds quite simply and convincingly; it is a warm-hearted family story - sentimental perhaps, but certainly not maudlin". Margaret Pemberton wrote in School Librarian that "the slow build up revealing relationships, together with emotional pulls, make for a gripping story ideal for junior ages and provoking both thoughts and questions".
