= Isles of Scilly Museum =

Museum in Isles of Scilly, Cornwall, UK

Coordinates: 49.9147065°N 6.31538889°W

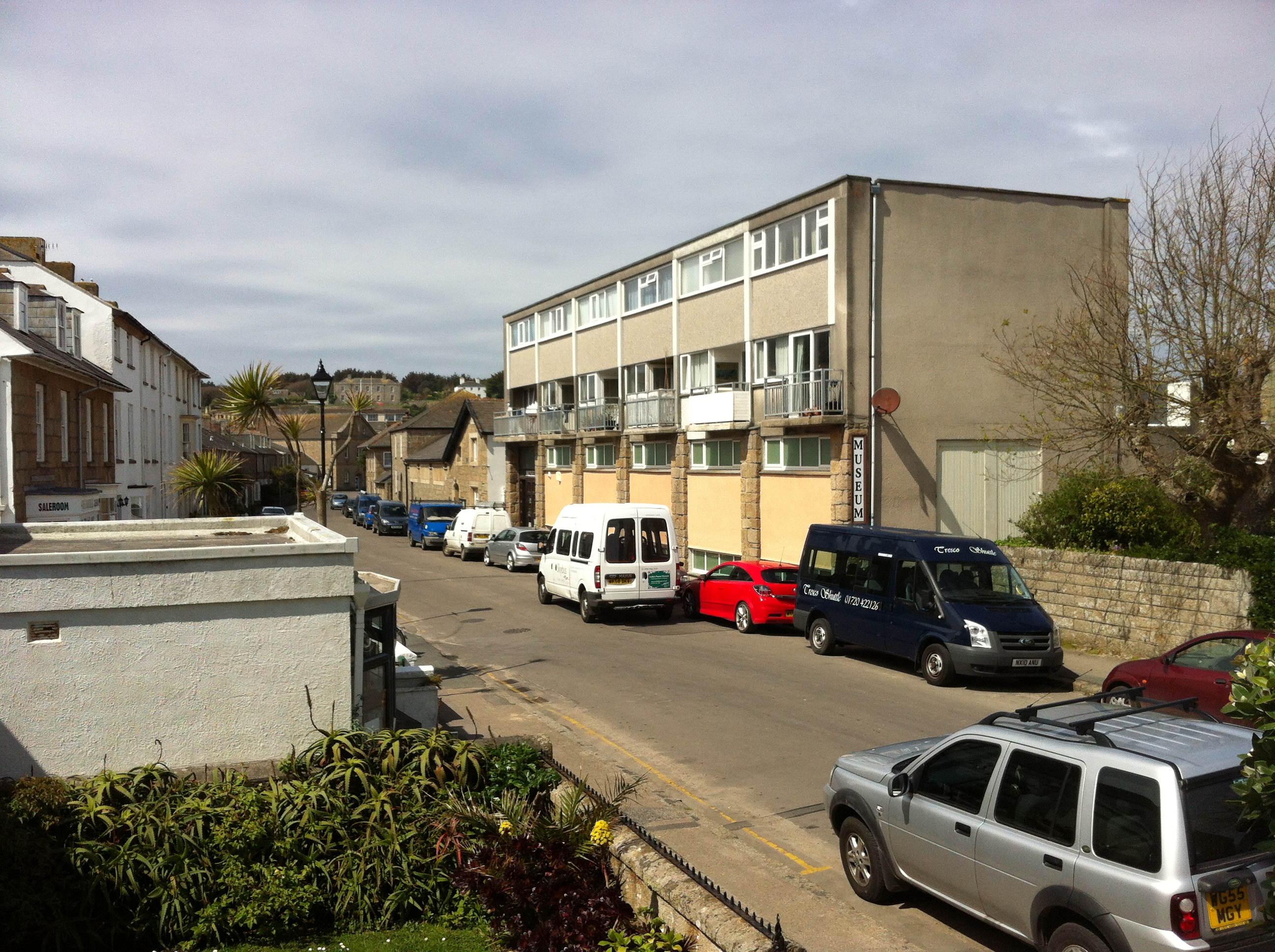
The 1967 museum building, seen in 2013, before closure

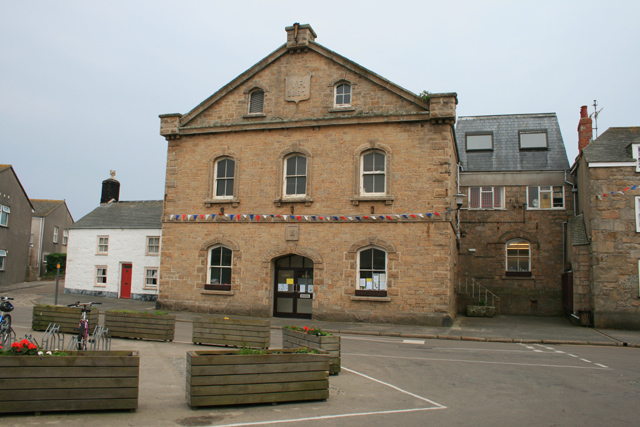
The Isles of Scilly Town Hall, the future Isles of Scilly Museum & Cultural Centre, seen in 2008

The Isles of Scilly Museum is a museum in the Isles of Scilly, off Cornwall, England. The museum closed because its former home was unsafe but will re-open in the former Town Hall in Spring 2027 as the Isles of Scilly Museum & Cultural Centre.

== Collections ==
The museum describes its collections as "extremely diverse, including material from many wrecks; a wild flower display (during the summer months); Romano-British artefacts; stuffed birds; local art and much more". They include Romano-British finds from the small island of Nornour, and the Bryher Sword and Bryher Mirror from the iron-age grave of the Bryher Woman, found on Bryher in 1999.

== History ==
When storms in 1962 uncovered a collection of Romano-British artefacts on the island of Nornour, a group of islanders established a museum for their display, initially as a seasonal display in the Wesleyan Chapel. By 1967 they had raised funds and a museum building, with residential flats above, was built in Church Street, Hugh Town on St Mary's. The museum opened on 15 July 1967 and was visited by Queen Elizabeth II on 8 August 1967. It is run by the Isles of Scilly Museum Association, a registered charity.

In June 2019 the Council of the Isles of Scilly, announced that "An engineer has assessed the building and advised that the ceiling of the museum poses a risk to staff and visitors", and in September 2019 the council informed the association that "because the Museum building was considered beyond practical and economic repair, Councillors had therefore agreed to seek vacant possession of the building with a view to its demolition."

== Temporary arrangements ==
The museum has arranged the removal of its collections from the condemned building, and stored them in the Isles of Scilly Town Hall (an 1889 grade II listed building in The Parade, Hugh Town) and the Porthmellon Enterprise Centre.

Several "Pop-up" exhibitions have been established on the various islands, under the title "Museum on the Move", and the front part of the Town Hall is in use as a Visitor Centre displaying some of the museum's greatest treasures, including Bryher Woman's sword and mirror.

In 2021, the museum's curator, Kate Hale, told The Guardian:

The priority in the short term was to get everything safe. The mid term is to keep the museum alive ... Museum on the Move is part of that. But we’re also planning for the long term, how we can build a new permanent museum and make sure it is the centre of cultural life on Scilly. We are ambitious and optimistic.

== Future ==
The existing Town Hall building will reopen as the Isles of Scilly Museum & Cultural Centre. In December 2022, a National Lottery Heritage Fund grant was obtained to support the development of plans, and with a further grant the building will reopen in the spring of 2027.
