= John Dickinson (author) =

English author

- Born: John Geoffrey Hyett Dickinson; June 1962 (age 64); London, England, United Kingdom
- Occupation: Novelist
- Relatives: Peter Dickinson; Philippa Dickinson
- Writing career
- Notable work: The Cup of the World

John Geoffrey Hyett Dickinson (born June 1962) is an English author of young adult novels. His first novel, The Cup of the World, was published in 2004. His novel The Lightstep, written for adults, was published in 2008.

Dickinson lives in Painswick, Gloucestershire.

== Biography ==
Dickinson is the eldest son of author Peter Dickinson and Mary Rose Barnard. He has two sisters, of whom one is the book editor Philippa Dickinson, and a brother. He was educated at St Paul's School (London) and Trinity College, Oxford, where he achieved a First in History.

From 1985 to 1998, Dickinson worked at the Ministry of Defence (MOD). During this time he was seconded to the Cabinet Office (1993–1995) and to the UK Delegation to NATO where he worked on the Membership Action Plans of the states that joined NATO in 2004.

Dickinson left the MOD on a sabbatical in 2002 to become a full-time writer. He wrote two unpublished novels before the third, The Cup of the World, was published in 2004 by David Fickling Books, an imprint of Random House Children’s Books.

In 1992 Dickinson married Pippa Thomson. They have two children.

== Writing style/themes ==
Dickinson has written three fantasy novels, The Cup of the World (2004), The Widow and the King (2005) and The Fatal Child (2008), which are primarily for young adults. The Cup of the World and The Widow and the King have been published in the United States and Brazil as well as in the UK. The Cup of the World has been published in Thailand.

The Cup of the World and its sequels follow a young woman, Phaedra, and subsequently her son, Ambrose, as they come to understand the forces of sin and retribution that have afflicted a small medieval kingdom since its founding. The writing style of The Cup of the World was described by Jan Mark in The Guardian as "detailed, glowing rich, and unforgettable." Amanda Craig wrote in The Times that The Cup of the World and The Widow and the King were "The strangest novels I’ve come across since William Morris’s fairytales."

His third published book, The Lightstep (2008), is a historical novel for adults, set in eighteenth century Germany. It tells the story of a former republican activist, Michel Wéry, who has become disillusioned by the atrocities of the French Revolution and has become a spy for the aristocratic regime of a small German state.

Dickinson's science fiction novel, WE, was published on 7 January 2010. Philip Ardagh, reviewing the book for The Guardian, described the setting as "totally convincing and claustrophic" and that "...it is to Dickinson's credit that intellectual argument and internal conflict have been used to create such a strong driving force."

== Bibliography ==
=== The Cup of the World ===
- The Cup of the World (2004)
- The Widow and the King (2005)
- The Fatal Child (2008)

=== Stand-alone novels ===
- The Lightstep (2008)
- WE (2010)

=== Muddle and Win novels ===
- Muddle and Win - The Battle for Sally Jones (2012)
- Attack of the Cupids (2013)
