= Michael Foreman (illustrator) =

British author (born 1938)

Michael Foreman OBE
- Born: 21 March 1938 (age 88) Pakefield, Suffolk, England
- Occupation: Author; illustrator
- Notable awards: Kate Greenaway Medal (1982, 1989)

Michael Foreman OBE (born 21 March 1938) is a British author and illustrator, one of the best-known and most prolific creators of children's books. He won the 1982 and 1989 Kate Greenaway Medals for British children's book illustration and he was a runner-up five times.

For his contribution as a children's illustrator he was UK nominee in 1988 and again in 2010 for the biennial, international Hans Christian Andersen Award, the highest recognition available to creators of children's books.

== Life ==
Foreman was born and grew up in Pakefield, near Lowestoft, Suffolk, where his mother kept the village shop. His father died a month before he was born. When he was three, the family home was hit by a German bomb, but he survived along with his mother and two older brothers. He studied at Lowestoft School of Art, and later in London at the Royal College of Art, where he won a scholarship to the United States.

Foreman was appointed Officer of the Order of the British Empire (OBE) in the 2022 Birthday Honours for services to literature.

== Approach to illustration ==
Foreman learned to respond instantly to text as an art student. Having drawn for the newspapers and for the police, drawing female suspects when Identikit only catered for men, he gained valuable drawing experience. A travel scholarship took him all around the world, drawing landscapes, architecture and wildlife. Although many of his books feature luminous watercolours, it is the drawing that he sees as vital: "It's all in the drawing and illustration. It's a question of creating another world, believable in its own right. I think I was very lucky to have started art school so young when they actually taught Art. It was a rigorous training – not just painting and drawing from life – but hours of anatomy and perspective. ... it really taught you to understand what you were looking at." His aim in illustration is to make the worlds created believable, real: "I keep trying to make things more real, not in a literal photographic sense, but in an emotional sense, telling a story by capturing the essence of the situation, giving it some meaning."

== Selected works ==
=== 1960s ===
- 1961 Comic Alphabets: Their origin, development, nature (illustrator) Routledge & Kegan Paul (ISBN 978-0-7100-1939-4), by Eric Partridge
- 1961 The General (illustrator) Routledge & Kegan Paul, by Jane Charters
- 1961 The King Who Lived on Jelly (illustrator) Routledge & Kegan Paul
- 1962 Poems by Children 1950–61 (illustrator) Routledge & Kegan Paul
- 1966 Huit Enfants et un Bebe (illustrator) Abelard-Schuman
- 1966 Making Music (illustrator) Longman
- 1966 The Bad Food Guide (illustrator) Routledge & Kegan Paul
- 1967 I'm for You, and You're for Me (illustrator) Abelard-Schuman
- 1967 The Perfect Present (author/illustrator) Hamish Hamilton
- 1967 The Two Giants (author/illustrator) Brockhampton Press
- 1968 Let's Fight! and Other Russian Fables (illustrator) Pantheon (U.S.)
- 1968 The Great Sleigh Robbery (author/illustrator) Hamish Hamilton
- 1969 Essex Poems, 1963–67 (illustrator) Routledge & Kegan Paul

=== 1970s ===
- 1970 Adam's Balm (illustrator) Bowmar (U.S.)
- 1970 Horatio (author/illustrator) Hamish Hamilton
- 1970 The Birthday Unicorn (illustrator) Gollancz
- 1971 James and the Giant Peach (an adaptation) (illustrator) Penguin
- 1971 Moose (author/illustrator) Hamish Hamilton
- 1971 The Living Arts of Nigeria (illustrator) Studio Vista
- 1972 Dinosaurs and all that rubbish (author/illustrator) Hamish Hamilton, adapted into an online series and musical theatre production by Roustabout Theatre in 2021
- 1973 Alexander in the Land of Mog (illustrator) Brockhampton Press
- 1973 Mr Noah and the Second Flood (illustrator) Gollancz
- 1973 The Living Treasures of Japan (illustrator) Wildwood House
- 1973 The Pushcart War (illustrator) Hamish Hamilton
- 1974 War and Peas (writer and illustrator) Hamish Hamilton
- 1975 Private Zoo (illustrator) Collinsn
- 1975 Rainbow Rider (illustrator) Collins
- 1976 Hans Andersen: His Classic Fairy Tales (illustrator) Gollancz
- 1976 Monkey and the Three Wizards (illustrator) Collins
- 1976 The Stone Book (illustrator) Collins
- 1977 Granny Reardun (illustrator) Collins
- 1977 Panda's Puzzle (author/illustrator) Hamish Hamilton
- 1977 Teeny-Tiny and the Witch-Woman (illustrator) Andersen Press
- 1977 Tom Fobble's Day (illustrator) Collins
- 1978 Borrowed Feathers and Other Fables (illustrator) Hamish Hamilton
- 1978 Mickey's Kitchen Contest (illustrator) Andersen Press
- 1978 Popular Folk Tales (illustrator) Gollancz, newly translated from Brothers Grimm by Brian Alderson —a Greenaway runner up, (Note: Today there are usually eight books on the Greenaway shortlist. According to CCSU, some runners-up through 2002 were Commended (from 1959) or Highly Commended (from 1974). There were 99 commendations of both kinds in 44 years including three each for 1978, 1980, and 1983; two each for 1985 and 1993. There were 31 high commendations in 29 years including Foreman alone in 1980. • No one has won three Greenaway Medals. Among the fourteen illustrators with two Medals, Foreman is one of seven with at least one highly commended runner up (1974–2002), led by Helen Oxenbury with four. He is their leader with five commendations of both kinds.)
- 1978 The Aimer Gate (illustrator) Collins
- 1978 The Princess and the Golden Mane (illustrator) Collins,
- 1978 The Selfish Giant (illustrator) Kaye & Ward
- 1979 Alan The Three Golden Heads of the Well (illustrator) Collins
- 1979 How to Catch a Ghost (illustrator) Holt (U.S.)
- 1979 The Golden Brothers (illustrator) Collins
- 1979 Winter's Tales (author) Benn

=== 1980s ===
- 1980 After Many a Summer (illustrator) Folio Society
- 1980 Alan Garner's Fairytales of Gold (illustrator) Collins
- 1980 City of Gold and Other Stories from the Old Testament (illustrator) Gollancz, retold by Peter Dickinson, who won the Carnegie Medal —a Greenaway runner up (Highly Commended),
- 1980 The Faithful Bull (illustrator) Hamish Hamilton
- 1980 The Pig Plantagenet (illustrator) Hutchinson
- 1980 The Tiger Who Lost his Stripes (illustrator) Andersen Press
- 1981 Fairy Tales (illustrator) Pavilion, by Terry Jones
- 1981 Over the Bridge (illustrator) Viking Kestrel
- 1981 Panda and the Old Lion (author/illustrator) Hamish Hamilton
- 1981 The Nightingale and the Rose (illustrator) Kaye & Ward
- 1981 Trick a Tracker (author/illustrator) Gollancz
- 1982 Land of Dreams (author/illustrator) Andersen Press
- 1982 Long Neck and Thunder Foot (illustrator) Viking Kestrel, by Helen Piers —joint winner of the Kate Greenaway Medal for British children's book illustration
- 1982 Sleeping Beauty and other favourite fairy tales (illustrator) Gollancz, selected and translated from Perrault and Le Prince de Beaumont by Angela Carter —joint winner of the Greenaway Medal and winner of the Kurt Maschler Award for integration of writing and illustration in a British children's book
- 1982 The Crab That Played with the Sea (illustrator) Macmillan
- 1982 The Magic Mouse and the Millionaire (illustrator) Hamish Hamilton
- 1983 A Christmas Carol: A Ghost Story of Christmas (illustrator) Gollancz
- 1983 Poems for 7-Year-Olds and Under (illustrator) Viking Kestrel
- 1983 The Brontosaurus Birthday Cake (illustrator) Methuen
- 1983 The Saga of Erik the Viking (illustrator) Pavilion, by Terry Jones —a Greenaway runner up
- 1983 Treasure Island (illustrator) Puffin
- 1984 A Cat and Mouse Love Story (illustrator) Heinemann Quixote
- 1984 Cat and Canary (author/illustrator) Andersen Press
- 1984 Panda and the Bunyips (author/illustrator) Hamish Hamilton
- 1984 Poems for 9-year-olds (illustrator) Viking Kestrel
- 1984 Poems for Over 10-year-olds (illustrator) Viking Kestrel
- 1985 Charlie and the Chocolate Factory (illustrator, revised edition) Allen & Unwin, by Roald Dahl
- 1985 I'll Take You to Mrs Cole (illustrator) Andersen Press
- 1985 Nicobobinus (illustrator) Pavilion
- 1985 Poetic Gems (illustrator) Folio Society
- 1985 Seasons of Splendour: Tales, myths, and legends of India (illustrator) Pavilion, Madhur Jaffrey —a Greenaway runner up,
- 1986 Ben's Box: A Pop-up Fantasy (author/illustrator) Hodder & Stoughton
- 1986 Charlie and the Great Glass Elevator (illustrator) Allen & Unwin
- 1986 Early in the Morning: A Collection of New Poems (illustrator) Viking
- 1986 Letters from Hollywood (illustrator) Harrap
- 1986 Panda and the Bushfire (author/illustrator) Hamish Hamilton
- 1986 Tales for the Telling (illustrator) Pavilion
- 1987 Ben's Baby (author/illustrator) Andersen Press
- 1987 Brontosaurus Superstar (illustrator) Magnet
- 1987 du Maurier's Classics of the Macabre (illustrator) Gollancz
- 1987 Fun (illustrator) Gollancz
- 1987 Adventures of Charlie and Mr Willy Wonka (illustrator) Unwin Hyman
- 1987 The Jungle Book (illustrator) Puffin
- 1988 Edmond Went Far Away (illustrator) Walker Macmillan
- 1988 The Angel and the Wild Animal (author/illustrator) Andersen Press
- 1988 The Curse of the Vampire's Socks (illustrator) Pavilion
- 1988 The Magic Ointment (illustrator) Macmillan
- 1988 The Night Before Christmas (illustrator) Viking
- 1988 Peter Pan and Wendy (illustrator) Pavilion
- 1988 Worms Wiggle (author/illustrator) Carnival
- 1989 Land of the Long White Cloud (illustrator) Pavilion
- 1989 Once Upon a Planet (illustrator) Puffin
- 1989 The Sand Horse (illustrator) Andersen Press
- 1989 War Boy: a country childhood (author/illustrator) Pavilion —memoir, winner of the Kate Greenaway Medal, —also entitled War Boy: a wartime childhood

=== 1990s ===
- 1990 Michael Foreman (author/illustrator) Beetles
- 1990 Michael Foreman's Mother Goose (illustrator) Walker
- 1990 Michael Foreman's World of Fairy Tales (illustrator) Pavilion
- 1990 One World (author/illustrator) Andersen Press
- 1990 The Brothers Grimm: Popular Folk Tales (illustrator) Gollancz
- 1991 Busy! Busy! Busy! (illustrator) Andersen Press
- 1991 Michael Foreman's Nursery Rhymes (illustrator) Walker
- 1991 The Boy Who Sailed with Columbus (author/illustrator) Pavilion
- 1991 The Puffin Book of Twentieth-Century Stories (illustrator) Viking
- 1991 The Puffin Book of Twentieth-Century Verse (illustrator) Viking
- 1991 The Young Man of Cury and Other Poems (illustrator) Macmillan
- 1992 Fantastic Stories (illustrator) Pavilion
- 1992 Jack's Fantastic Voyage (author/illustrator) Andersen Press
- 1992 Spider the Horrible Cat (illustrator) Pavilion
- 1992 The Arabian Nights (illustrator) Gollancz
- 1992 The Echoing Green (illustrator) Viking
- 1992 Wyvern Winter (illustrator) Andersen Prensiess
- 1993 A Fish of the World (illustrator) Pavilion
- 1993 Funnybunch: A New Puffin Book of Funny Verse (illustrator) Viking
- 1993 Grandfather's Pencil (author/illustrator) Andersen Press
- 1993 The Beast with a Thousand Teeth (illustrator) Pavilion
- 1993 The Long Weekend (illustrator) Andersen Press
- 1993 There's a Bear in the Bath (illustrator) Pavilion
- 1993 War Game (author/illustrator) Pavilion —a Greenaway runner up,
- 1993 Wyvern Spring (illustrator) Andersen Press
- 1994 Arthur, High King of Britain (illustrator) Pavilion/The National Trust
- 1994 Dad! I Can't Sleep (author/illustrator) Andersen Press
- 1994 Sarah and the Sandhorse (illustrator) Andersen Press
- 1994 The Fly-by-Night (illustrator) Pavilion
- 1994 The Sea Tiger (illustrator) Pavilion
- 1994 Wyvern Fall (illustrator) Andersen Press
- 1994 Wyvern Summer (illustrator) Andersen Press
- 1995 After the War was Over (author/illustrator) Pavilion
- 1995 Peter's Place (illustrator) Andersen Press
- 1995 Shakespeare Stories II (illustrator) Gollancz
- 1995 Surprise! Surprise! (author/illustrator) Andersen Press
- 1995 The Little Prince (illustrator) Pavilion
- 1996 A Child's Garden of Verses (illustrator) Gollancz
- 1996 Peter Pan and Wendy (illustrator) Pavilion
- 1996 Robin of Sherwood (illustrator) Pavilion
- 1996 Seal Surfer (author/illustrator) Andersen Press
- 1996 The Little Reindeer (author/illustrator) Andersen Press
- 1996 The Songs My Paddle Sings (illustrator) Pavilion
- 1996 There's a Bear in the Classroom (illustrator) Pavilion
- 1997 Creation: Stories from Around the World (illustrator) Walker
- 1997 Farm Boy (illustrator) Pavilion
- 1997 Look! Look! (author/illustrator) Andersen Press
- 1997 The Knight and the Squire (illustrator) Pavilion
- 1997 The Little Ships (illustrator) Pavilion
- 1998 Chicken Licken (illustrator) Andersen Press
- 1998 Cockadoodle-doo Mr Sultana! (illustrator) Scholastic
- 1998 Jack's Big Race (author/illustrator) Andersen Press
- 1998 Joan of Arc (illustrator) Pavilion
- 1999 Kensuke's Kingdom (illustrator) Heinemann
- 1999 Michael Foreman's Christmas Treasury (author/illustrator) Pavilion
- 1999 The Little Red Hen (author/illustrator) Andersen Press
- 1999 The Merrymaid of Zennor (illustrator) Orchard
- 1999 The Rainbow Bear (illustrator) Doubleday
- 1999 The Shining Princess and Other Japanese Legends (illustrator) Andersen Press
- 1999 The Story of Millennia the Angel (illustrator) Orchard
- 1999 The Wonderful Wizard of Oz (illustrator) Pavilion

=== 2000s ===
- 2000 Billy the Kid (illustrator) Pavilion
- 2000 Cat in the Manger (author/illustrator) Andersen Press
- 2000 Memories of Childhood (author/illustrator) Pavilion
- 2000 Rock-a-doodle-doo! (author/illustrator) Andersen Press
- 2000 The Lady and the Squire (illustrator) Pavilion
- 2000 Why Bear has a Stumpy Tail (illustrator) Walker
- 2001 Out of the Ashes (illustrator) Macmillan
- 2001 Saving Sinbad (author/illustrator) Andersen Press
- 2001 The Wind in the Willows (illustrator) Pavilion
- 2001 Tom and the Pterosaur (illustrator) Walker
- 2001 Toro! Toro! (illustrator) Collins
- 2002 Bedtime Stories (illustrator) Chrysalis
- 2002 Cool! (illustrator) Collins
- 2002 Dinosaur Time (author/illustrator) Andersen Press
- 2002 Evie and the Man who Helped God (author/illustrator) Andersen Press
- 2002 Michael Foreman's Playtime Rhymes (author/illustrator) Walker
- 2002 The Last Wolf (illustrator) Doubleday
- 2002 The Sleeping Sword (illustrator) Egmont
- 2002 Wonder Goal (author/illustrator) Andersen Press
- 2003 Bobby, Charlton and the Mountain (illustrator) Andersen Press
- 2003 Cat on the Hill (author/illustrator) Andersen Press
- 2003 Hello World (author/illustrator) Walker
- 2004 Dolphin Boy (illustrator) Andersen Press
- 2004 Gentle Giant (illustrator) Collins
- 2004 Sir Gawain and the Green Knight (illustrator) Walker
- 2004 Alice's adventures in Wonderland (illustrator) Sterling
- 2004 One world (author/illustrator) Anderson Press
- 2004 Christmas crimes (illustrator) Folio Society
- 2005 Classic fairy tales (illustrator) Sterling
- 2005 The Amazing Story of Adolphus Tips (illustrator) Harper Collins
- 2005 Can't Catch Me!, author/illustrator, Andersen Press
- 2006 Beowulf, illustrator, Candlewick
- 2006 Fox Tale, author/illustrator, Andersen Press
- 2006 Mia's Story, author/illustrator, Walker
- 2006 Norman's Ark, author/illustrator, Andersen Press
- 2007 Michael Foreman's Classic Fairy Tales, adapter/illustrator, Pavilion
- 2007 Say Hello, illustrator, Walker
- 2007 Soggy the Bear, illustrator, Mabecron Books
- 2007 Soggy to the Rescue, illustrator, Mabecron Books
- 2007 Team Trouble, illustrator, Andersen Press
- 2007 The Mozart Question, illustrator, Walker
- 2007 White Owl, Barn Owl, illustrator, Candlewick
- 2008 Kaspar, illustrator, HarperCollins
- 2008 Soggy and the Mermaid, illustrator, Mabecron Books
- 2008 The Lion Who Ate Everything, illustrator, Walker
- 2008 The Little Dinosaur, author/illustrator, Walker
- 2009 A Child's Garden: A Story of Hope, author/illustrator, Walker
- 2009 Pirates Ahoy!, illustrator, Andersen Press
- 2009 The Littlest Dinosaur's Big Adventure, author/illustrator, Walker
- 2010 Why the Animals Came to Town, author/illustrator, Walker
- 2011 Little Manfred illustrator
- 2012 A Medal for Leroy illustrator
- 2015 The Tortoise and the Soldier, author/illustrator, Henry Holt
- 2021 Noa and the Little Elephant, author/illustrator, HarperCollins Children's Books in association with Tusk Trust

== Awards ==
- 1997 Nestlé Smarties Book Prize (Silver Award)
- 1993 Nestlé Smarties Book Prize (Gold Award)
- 1989 Kate Greenaway Medal
- 1982 Kate Greenaway Medal
- 1982 Kurt Maschler Award
- 1980 Bologna Children's Book Fair Graphics Prize
- 1977 Francis Williams Award for Illustration
- 1977 National Art Library Illustration Award
- 1972 Festival International du Livre Aigle d'Argent Award
- 1972 National Art Library Illustration Award
- 1971 Francis Williams Award for Illustration
