= The Flight of Dragons =

1982 film by Jules Bass, Arthur Rankin, Jr., Katsuhisa Yamada

- US DVD cover
- Directed by: Arthur Rankin Jr.; Jules Bass
- Written by: Romeo Muller (screenplay); Peter Dickinson (book); Gordon R. Dickson (novel)
- Based on: The Flight of Dragons by Peter Dickinson
- Produced by: Arthur Rankin Jr.; Jules Bass
- Starring: John Ritter; Victor Buono; James Gregory; James Earl Jones; Harry Morgan
- Music by: Maury Laws; Don McLean
- Production companies: Rankin/Bass Productions; Topcraft Limited Company
- Distributed by: Warner Bros. Television Distribution
- Release dates: August 20, 1982 (United States); September 1983 (United Kingdom)
- Running time: 92 minutes
- Countries: United States; Japan
- Language: English

The Flight of Dragons is a 1982 animated fantasy film produced and directed by Jules Bass and Arthur Rankin Jr. loosely combining the speculative natural history book of the same name (1979) by Peter Dickinson with the novel The Dragon and the George (1976) by Gordon R. Dickson. It stars the voices of John Ritter, Victor Buono (in his final role before his death), James Gregory, James Earl Jones, and Harry Morgan. The film centers upon a quest undertaken to stop an evil wizard who plans to rule the world by dark magic. A major theme within the story is the question of whether science and magic can co-exist. This is told mostly through the experience of character Peter Dickinson, drawn from the 20th century into the magical realm.

Released direct to video in the United Kingdom in September 1983, it was aired as an ABC "Saturday Night Movie" on August 2, 1986, and released by Warner Brothers as a made-to-order DVD in the US on 17 November 2009 as part of the "Warner Archive Collection". The opening song is sung by Don McLean.

== Plot ==
In the time of medieval fantasy populated by fantastic creatures, the Green Wizard Carolinus, who presides over nature, including plants and animals, notices that magic is fading from the world as humanity embraces logic and science. Summoning his three magical brothers, he proposes combining their powers to create a "last realm of magic" as a nature reserve for the fantastic creatures hidden from the rest of the world. The Blue Wizard Solarius, who commands the heavens and seas, and the Golden Wizard Lo Tae Zhao, whose realm is light and air, agree to the proposal. However, the Red Wizard Ommadon, master of black magic, resolves instead to infect mankind with vice, causing humans to use their science to destroy themselves (it is inferred through a brief but terrifying shot that nuclear war will be the method) through their arrogance, greed, jealousy and prejudice.

Since the wizards are forbidden to fight among themselves, Carolinus proposes sending a group of heroes on a quest to steal Ommadon's crown, the source of his power. The party includes the knight Sir Orrin Neville-Smythe and Carolinus' young dragon companion, Gorbash. Solarius gives them an enchanted shield - The Shield of Saturn, which can deflect dark magic, and Lo Tae Zhao contributes a magic flute - The Flute of Olympus, which lulls dragons to sleep. To find a leader, Carolinus consults the magical force of Antiquity, which directs him to look 1,000 years into the future to find a man of science descended from a legendary hero. In the 20th century Boston, Carolinus locates Peter Dickinson, a former scientist turned board game designer who is obsessed with dragons. Carolinus brings Peter back through time and enlists him in the quest. Peter becomes enamored of Carolinus' ward, Princess Melisande. Ommadon sends his dragon Bryagh to capture Peter, and an accident with one of Carolinus' spells while rescuing him causes Peter to merge with Gorbash, with Peter's mind taking over the dragon's body.

Knowing nothing about being a dragon, Peter is mentored by Carolinus' elder dragon companion, Smrgol. The dichotomy of magic and science is explored as Smrgol teaches Peter how dragons fly and breathe fire, abilities Peter can explain with scientific principles. As the quest progresses, the heroes survive an attack by the monstrous Sandmurks and are joined by the noble wolf Aragh, the archer Danielle, and the elf Giles. As the party nears Ommadon's realm, Danielle and Sir Orrin are captured by an ogre. Peter is nearly killed while attempting to rescue them but is saved by Smrgol, who defeats the ogre at the cost of his own life. In the Red Wizard's realm, the party faces the Worm of Sligoff, which Peter destroys by igniting the sulfuric acid it excretes. Ommadon casts a spell to induce hopelessness in the group, which Peter repels with Solarius' shield. Ommadon then sends numerous dragons to kill the heroes, but Giles plays Lo Tae Zhao's enchanted flute, lulling them and Peter to sleep. Bryagh remains awake and kills Giles, Aragh, and Danielle. Sir Orrin slays Bryagh but dies from his wounds.

When Ommadon appears on the battlefield, Peter separates himself from Gorbash by recalling the principle of impenetrability. He defeats Ommadon by countering the wizard's declarations of magic with explanations of science and logic and by denying magic's existence. This destroys Ommadon, restores the other heroes to life, and allows the magical realm to take shape. Peter, having denied all magic, is separated forever from this realm, but not before awakening Melisande with a kiss and leaving her Ommadon's crown. Having fallen in love with Peter, Melisande begs Carolinus to allow her to join him. Back in 20th-century Boston, Peter is selling the magic shield to a pawnbroker when Melisande enters the shop carrying the crown, and the two embrace.

== Voice cast ==
- Victor Buono as Aragh
- James Gregory as Smrgol and Bryagh
- James Earl Jones as Ommadon the Red Wizard
- Harry Morgan as Carolinus the Green Wizard
- John Ritter as Peter Dickinson
- Larry Storch as the Pawnbroker, Mill Worker
- Don Messick as Lo Tae Zhao the Golden Wizard, Giles the Elf, Mill Worker
- Bob McFadden as Sir Orrin Neville-Smythe, Gorbash, Solarius the Blue Wizard
- Alexandra Stoddart as Princess Melisande
- Nellie Bellflower as Danielle
- Paul Frees as Antiquity (uncredited)

Additional character voices were provided by Ed Peck and Jack Lester.

== Crew ==
Directors/Producers	Arthur Rankin Jr., Jules Bass
Associate producers	Masaki Iizuka, Lee Dannacher
Screenplay by	Romeo Muller
Based on The Flight of Dragons by	Peter Dickinson
Additional story material from The Dragon and the George by	Gordon R. Dickson
Design by	Wayne Anderson
Original score by	Maury Laws
Title song by	Jules Bass, Maury Laws
Title song performed by	Don McLean
Additional material written by	Jeffrey Walker
Animation coordinator	Toru Hara
Storyboard and Animation directors	Katsuhisa Yamada, Fumihiko Takayama

== Broadcast ==
The Flight of Dragons premiered on ABC on August 3, 1986. The Disney Channel aired the film on December 1, 1992. Cartoon Network broadcast the film on July 30, 1995 as part of Mr. Spim's Cartoon Theater.

== Reception ==
Filmsy.com said of the film, "Animated fantasy films geared for family viewing just aren’t made like this anymore... The voice acting in this movie is excellent, to say the least... Though the animation might seem a bit 'dated', it remains beautiful by 1982 standards". "The dialogue is surprisingly intelligent and may confuse some children but it is nice to see an animated film that will stimulate adult minds a little... The voice cast are all great and I can’t find a single fault with any of them", said blogcritic.org. The Unknown Movies said "There may not be a strong constant thread in The Flight of Dragons, but all its moments of warmth, imagination, and interest combine to make magic."

Colin Greenland reviewed The Flight of Dragons for Imagine magazine, and stated that "The Flight of Dragons is unsophisticated to say the least, but the Japanese animation includes some nice shimmering effects; and if, like Dickinson's, your best character is a dragon, then this is for you."

Other reviews were less positive: "I'm sure fans of The Flight of Dragons, sick of looking at crappy downloads or worn VHS copies, will be satisfied with what's here, but if you didn't grow up with this one, it's best left alone."

== Home media ==
Various VHS editions of the film have been released since its debut in 1982. There was also a LaserDisc release from which some VHS copies were produced. The LaserDisc release was made by PolyGram Video in the United Kingdom, and there was also a Betamax release. In 1996, Warner Home Video released the film as part of the Warner Bros. Classic Tales VHS series, which was also available in Australia one year later. The Warner Archive Collection released the film on DVD on November 17, 2009. In December 2017, Warner Archive announced that they would be releasing the film on Blu-ray in 2018. The Blu-ray was released on January 16, 2018. The Blu-ray has the film in widescreen and has the original 4x3 standard definition version as a special feature.

== Soundtrack ==
The original score was composed by Maury Laws. The film's theme song, also entitled "The Flight of Dragons", was written and composed by Jules Bass and Maury Laws, and performed by Don McLean. An official soundtrack was never released.

== See also ==
- List of animated feature films of 1982
