= The Dragon and the George =

1976 fantasy novel by Gordon R. Dickson

- Dust jacket from the first edition
- Author: Gordon R. Dickson
- Cover artist: Boris Vallejo
- Language: English
- Series: Dragon Knight
- Genre: Fantasy
- Publisher: Doubleday (SFBC)
- Publication date: May 7, 1976
- Publication place: United States
- Media type: Print (Hardcover & Paperback)
- Pages: 244 pp
- ISBN: 0-345-35050-2 (reprint)
- OCLC: 2284061
- Followed by: The Dragon Knight

The Dragon and the George is a 1976 fantasy novel by American writer Gordon R. Dickson, the first in his "Dragon Knight" series. A shorter form of the story was previously published as the short story, "St. Dragon and the George" in the September 1957 issue of The Magazine of Fantasy and Science Fiction.

The novel was loosely adapted into the 1982 animated movie The Flight of Dragons by Rankin/Bass.

== Plot summary ==
Jim Eckert holds a doctorate in medieval history and is hoping for an instructor position at a Minnesota university, where he works as an assistant to a history professor. He is engaged to marry Angie Farrell, who is working toward a doctorate in English literature and works as a laboratory assistant to psychology graduate Grottwald Weinar Hansen. During one of Grottwald's experiments in astral projection, Angie suddenly disappears. To locate her, Jim puts on the apparatus she was testing and finds his consciousness projected into a world of medieval fantasy, in which his mind inhabits the body of a dragon named Gorbash. In this world, dragons refer to humans as "georges" after the story of Saint George and the Dragon.

Two other dragons, Smrgol and Bryagh, have captured Angie. Despite being a dragon, Jim is able to convince Angie of his identity and attempts to hypnotize her in order to return her to the real world, but she refuses out of fear that he will be left behind. They seek help from the magician Carolinus, who demands payment in the form of Gorbash's treasure hoard, but Jim does not know its location. Bryagh kidnaps Angie and takes her to Loathly Tower, and Carolinus advises Jim to gather companions to assist in mounting a rescue. Jim meets the knight Sir Brian Neville-Smythe, who is sympathetic to his predicament, and the two set off to rescue Sir Brian's courtly love interest, Lady Geronde, from the clutches of the villainous Sir Hugh. Along the way they are attacked by creatures called sandmirks but are saved by the talking wolf Aragh, who is a friend of Gorbash. Aragh does not believe Jim's story about being stuck in Gorbash's body, but agrees to accompany him and Sir Brian. They are next joined by the archer Danielle, the Welsh bowman Dafydd ap Hywel, and the outlaw Giles of the Wold. Arriving at Malvern Castle, the party attempts to rescue Lady Geronde but Jim is wounded by Sir Hugh. Upon recovering he finds that Smrgol and Carolinus have joined the quest, though Smrgol is developing a stroke and thus is of limited ability. Jim attempts to head to Loathly Tower alone but, upon encountering more sandmirks, returns to his companions.

The next morning, Jim finds that Sir Hugh has captured a dragon named Secoh. With the help of his companions, Jim manages to drive off Sir Hugh and his men, free Secoh, and overcome the sandmirks. The group arrives at Loathly Tower, where they face Bryagh along with a monstrous worm, an ogre, sandmirks, and harpies. With some coaching from Smrgol, Jim fights the ogre while Sir Brian takes on the worm, Aragh deals with the sandmirks, Dafydd fends off the harpies, Smrgol and Secoh attack Bryagh, and Carolinus pitches in using magic. The heroes are able to overcome their enemies, but Smrgol is killed and Dafydd is wounded.

Jim finds Angie, who says that her mind has been in Jim's body part of the time. After some consideration, Jim and Angie decide to stay in the fantasy world. Carolinus separates Jim from Gorbash, and the group celebrates Jim's decision.

== Sources ==
- Barron, Neil, ed. (1999). Fantasy and Horror: A Critical Guide to Literature, Illustration, Film, TV, Radio and the Internet. Lanham, Maryland: The Scarecrow Press, Inc. p. 368. ISBN 0-8108-3596-7.
- Budrys, Algis (April 1977). "Books". The Magazine of Fantasy and Science Fiction. 52 (4). Mercury Publications: 35.
- Clute, John; Grant, John (1997). The Encyclopedia of Fantasy. New York: St. Martin's Press. p. 270. ISBN 0-88184-708-9.
- Clute, John; Nicholls, Peter (1995). The Encyclopedia of Science Fiction. New York: St. Martin's Griffin. p. 331. ISBN 0-312-13486-X.
- The Dragon and the George (1976) publication contents at the Internet Speculative Fiction Database
