= Grahame Farr =

British maritime historian

- Born: 27 October 1912; Clifton, Bristol
- Died: 22 November 1983 (aged 71)
- Education: Clifton College
- Occupation: Maritime historian
- Spouse: Elsie Farr
- Writing career
- Language: English
- Period: 1935–1983
- Subjects: History of ships, shipping and lifeboats
- Notable works: Records of Bristol Ships, 1800–1838 (Bristol, 1950); Somerset Harbours, including the Port of Bristol (London, 1954); West Country passenger steamers (Second, revised, edition, Prescot, 1967).

Grahame Edgar Farr (27 October 1912 – 22 November 1983) was a British maritime historian, specialising in the history of ships and shipping in the south-west of England from the eighteenth century onwards. He also wrote about the history of the lifeboat.

Farr was born, educated, lived and worked in Bristol; his interest in ships and shipping came from his father, and his upbringing in Bristol. Farr worked for a printing firm; his research and writing therefore had to be conducted in his spare time. Farr wrote many books on maritime history; the most notable being Records of Bristol Ships, 1800–1838; Somerset Harbours, including the Port of Bristol; and West Country passenger steamers. He archives are held by the National Maritime Museum and the Friends of Purton.

== Personal life ==
Farr was born in Clifton, Bristol on 27 October 1912. His father was Edgar James Farr, who worked for the Bristol Steam Navigation Company for 50 years, starting as an office boy and finishing as an accountant. The Western Daily Press described Edgar Farr as "A well-known figure in Bristol shipping circles". Farr's interest in ships and shipping came from his father, and his upbringing in Bristol. Farr was educated in his hometown at Clifton College.

Prior to the Second World War, Farr married a governess named Elsie. Their son Michael was born in Bristol on 18 November 1938. Before Michael's first birthday, Farr enlisted in the British army. While Farr served in the military, his wife and son lived in a house near the Avonmouth Docks in Bristol. To protect themselves when Germans bombed their town, Elsie and Michael stayed in a steel shelter in their dining room. In 1942, Elsie and Michael moved to a cottage owned by her employers in the village of Temple Cloud, where there was less likelihood of being bombed. In 1945, they visited family in Scotland. The family—Grahame, Elsie, and Michael—returned to their home in Bristol in July 1945.

== Career ==
On leaving Clifton College, Farr worked for a printing firm in Bristol, where he stayed for the whole of his professional life, apart from his war service. Farr's research and writing had to be conducted in his spare time.

During the Second World War, Farr served with the Royal Army Service Corps (RASC), being made Second Lieutenant on 23 November 1940. By 1944 he was a War Substantive Lieutenant. His war service took him to Kenya, Madagascar and Ceylon.

Farr was an early member of the Bristol Shiplovers Society (founded in 1931); he became its Honorary Secretary before the war. An objective of the society was to "collect data, past and present, of ships and sailors, chiefly relating to the Port of Bristol. These facts are entered into the log-books of the society and due course recorded in the archives of Bristol". During the war, his father, Edgar Farr, acted as secretary to Bristol Shiplovers Society on his son's behalf. Farr also became a member of the Society for Nautical Research, continuing as a member for nearly 50 years. His earliest article for the Society's journal, The Mariner's Mirror, was about Brunel's Great Western, built in Bristol. It was published in 1938.

Farr's earliest book was The Somersetshire Life-Boats (1935). Following the war, Farr wrote many books on maritime history, specialising in the history of ships and shipping in the West Country from the eighteenth century onwards. He wrote several monographs for the National Maritime Museum. Farr also contributed articles to journals, including The Mariner's Mirror. He was the first maritime historian to make intensive use of the Statutory Registers of Merchant Ships.

Farr was the archivist of the Lifeboat Enthusiasts' Society. The Society was formed in 1964, with the active co-operation of the Royal National Lifeboat Institution, "to facilitate communication between persons interested in the technical and historical aspects of life-boat work". Farr was also the honorary editor of the International Lifeboat Journal between 1974 and 1983.

== Death and legacy ==
Farr died on 22 November 1983, after a long struggle against deteriorating health and eyesight. His obituary in The Mariner's Mirror described him as "a remarkable man, assiduous and painstaking in his research, and yet ever-ready to share his knowledge with others".

A marine historian of distinction and authority, he wrote a number of books on wrecks and rescue in the West Country as well as compiling papers on early classes of lifeboats and amassing detailed aids to lifeboat history. His meticulous work provided invaluable sources of reference for other researchers, his contribution to the understanding of lifeboat history being both unique and generous.

— Royal National Lifeboat Institution, Autumn 1983

== Works ==
Works by Farr are variously catalogued under the names Grahame Edgar Farr, Grahame E. Farr, Grahame Farr, and G. E. Farr. The following lists are largely derived from the catalogue of the British Library.

=== Wreck and rescue series ===
- Wreck and rescue round the Cornish coast. 1. The Story of the north coast Lifeboats. (With Cyril Noall.) Truro: D. Bradford Barton, 1964. OCLC 6663867
- Wreck and rescue round the Cornish coast. 2. The Story of the Land's End lifeboats. (With Cyril Noall.) Truro: D. Bradford Barton, 1965. OCLC 655506125
- Wreck and rescue round the Cornish coast. 3. The Story of the south coast lifeboats. (With Cyril Noall.) Truro: D. Bradford Barton, 1965. OCLC 867807117
- Wreck and rescue in the Bristol Channel. 1. The Story of the English Lifeboats. Truro: D. Bradford Barton, 1966. ISBN 978-0-85153-047-5
- Wreck and rescue in the Bristol Channel. 2. The story of the Welsh lifeboats. Truro: D. Bradford Barton, 1967. ISBN 978-0-85153-048-2
- Wreck and rescue on the coast of Devon. The Story of the South Devon Lifeboats. Truro: D. Bradford Barton, 1968. OCLC 196300
- Wreck and rescue on the Dorset coast. The story of the Dorset lifeboats. Truro: D. Bradford Barton, 1971. ISBN 978-0-85153-028-4

=== Papers on life-boat history ===
- No. 1: William Plenty's life boats, 1817–29: and James and Edward Pellew Plenty's life boat model, 1851. Portishead, 1975. ISBN 978-0-905033-00-6
- No. 2: George Palmer's life-boats, 1828–47: with allied types and variants. Portishead, 1975. ISBN 978-0-905033-01-3
- No. 3: Life-boats of the Shipwrecked Fishermen and Mariners' Royal Benevolent Society, 1851-4. Portishead, 1976. ISBN 978-0-905033-02-0
- No. 4: The tubular life-boats, 1850–1939. Portishead, 1977. ISBN 978-0-905033-03-7
- No. 5: The steam life-boats: with notes on earlier projects, and overseas steam life-boats. Portishead, 1981. ISBN 978-0-905033-06-8
- No. 6: The Lincolnshire Coast Shipwreck Association 1827–1864. Portishead, 1981. ISBN 978-0-905033-07-5

=== Aids to life-boat history ===
- No. 1: Hand-list of R.N.L.I. official numbers: and operational numbers. Portishead, 1978. 5th edition, 1993. ISBN 978-0-902792-12-8
- No. 2: British life-boat stations: a historical and geographical list. Portishead, 1979. 4th edition, 1993. ISBN 978-0-902792-13-5

=== Maritime monographs and reports ===
- No. 20: The ship registers of the Port of Hayle, 1864–1882. Greenwich: National Maritime Museum, 1975. ISBN 978-0-905555-94-2
- No. 22: Shipbuilding in North Devon: containing a list of the vessels known to have been built on the North Devon coast and rivers, with an introduction, notes on the builders, appendices, tables and a map. Greenwich: National Maritime Museum, 1976. ISBN 978-0-905555-32-4

=== Other books ===
- The Somersetshire Life-Boats. A brief history of rescue work on the Somersetshire coast. Bristol, 1935. OCLC 314507023
- Records of Bristol Ships, 1800–1838. Vessels over 150 tons. Bristol, 1950. OCLC 559613736
- Somerset Harbours, including the Port of Bristol. London, 1954. OCLC 936915316
- Chepstow Ships. Chepstow, 1954. OCLC 925830464
- West Country Passenger Steamers. London, 1956. Second edition, 1967. ISBN 978-0-901314-08-6
- The Bristol Shiplovers' Society, 1931–1956. Bristol, 1957. OCLC 39313073
- The Steamship Great Western: the first Atlantic liner. Bristol, 1963. OCLC 60576140
- The Steamship Great Britain. Bristol, 1965. OCLC 721849940
- West Country passenger steamers. Second edition. Prescot, 1967. OCLC 11460266
- Cornish shipwrecks. (With Cyril Noall.) Truro, 1969. OCLC 834219458
- Ships and Harbours of Exmoor (Microstudy). Dulverton, 1970. Second edition, 1974. ISBN 978-0-900131-15-8
- Bristol shipbuilding in the nineteenth century. Bristol, 1971. ISBN 978-0-901388-04-9
- Penlee Lifeboat: History of the Penlee and Penzance Branch of the R.N.L.I. (With John Corin.) Penzance, 1983. ISBN 978-0-9508611-0-4

== Archives ==
National Maritime Museum holds Farr's card index system for ships entering the Bristol Channel (between Milford, Gloucester and the Scilly Isles). Information in the cards ‘include the name of the vessel; port of registry and date which includes ports UK wide; an abbreviation description of the vessel; dimensions; tonnage; builders; engines; the first owners and if any changes were made to the vessel’.

The Friends of Purton acquired Farr's photographic collection in 2007. Started in the 1930s, the collection consists of several thousand black and white images of local coasters, lighters, paddle steamers, schooners, trows and related subjects.

The Exmoor Society's archives include extensive material relating to the commissioning and publication of Farr's microstudy on the ‘’Ships and Harbours of Exmoor’’ (1970).
