= Stroudwater barge =

Type of British river cargo boat

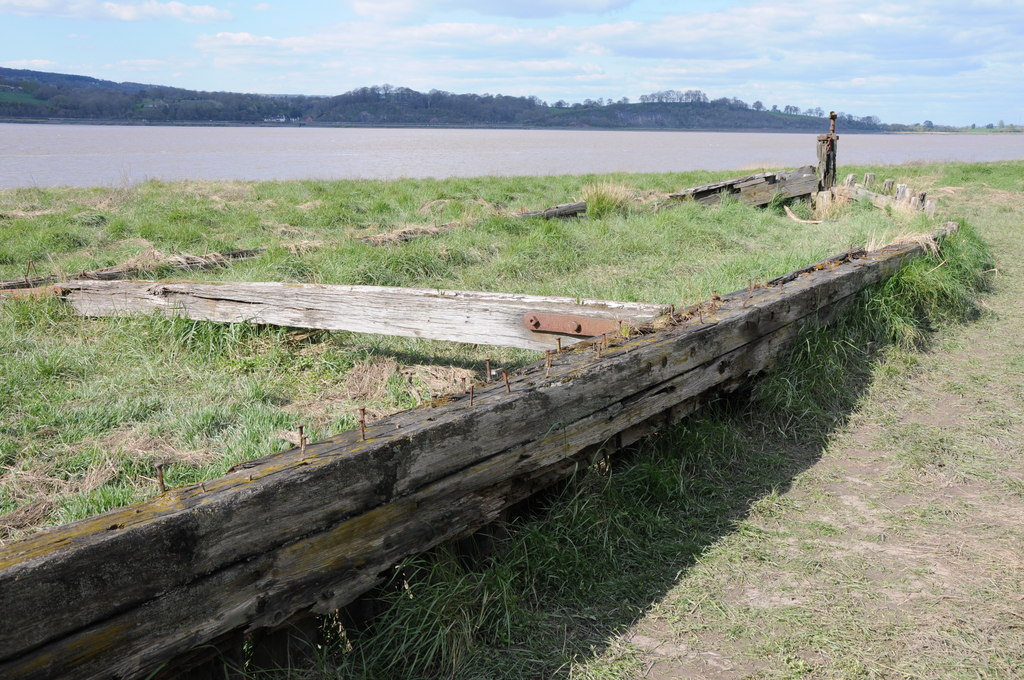
Tirley at Purton

A Stroudwater barge was a type of barge developed for use on the Stroudwater Navigation, a canal in Gloucestershire.

== Origins ==
As for most specialised British canal barge designs, their size was chosen to be the largest that could fit through the locks and bridges of the area in which they worked. The locks of the Stroudwater Navigation are 72 by 17.6 by 4.6 feet (21.9 m × 5.4 m × 1.4 m). This gave typical dimensions for the barges of 70 feet (21 m) length and a beam of 15.5 feet (4.7 m). They could carry between 70 and 75 tons.

As usual for barges they were carvel built, with bluff bows and rounded bilges. The stem post is high with a towing bitt behind, and with a canoe stern. (Note: Unlike the Severn Trow, which had a transom stern.) Both stem and stern had a small decked area. The bow carried a large iron windlass and the stern provided a small living cabin beneath the deck. There was no sailing mast or propulsion, as they were bank-hauled by horses.

These barges were used on the Stroudwater canal and onto the Gloucester and Sharpness Canal, via Saul Junction, and thence to either Gloucester or for transhipment from seagoing ships at Sharpness docks. The design changed very little in over 100 years.

As for so many designs, they were replaced by motor vessels after World War 2, as those were cheaper to operate. The last to operate were as dumb barges on the Gloucester and Sharpness Canal in the 1940s.

== Survivors ==
No examples survive. Some remain as wrecks.

The largest collection are six barges forming part of the Purton Hulks, a collection of boats beached on the banks of the Severn. The best surviving of these is the Rockby. Others are the Envoy, Glenby, Priory, Society and Tirley. A seventh of the Purton barges, the barge Abbey, has also been described as a Stroudwater barge by some sources. As the Abbey is 84ft 4in by 19ft 4in it is oversize for the Stroudwater locks.

During the demolition of the Severn Railway Bridge in the 1960s, the Halfren, a motorised barge of 1913, was used for collecting small pieces of wreckage. Worn out by this work and the frequent groundings, it was abandoned on the shore at Aust.

Finis, visible at Arlingham, Severn Bridge, Perseverance, Lavender are also mentioned as wrecks by Fred Rowbotham.

== See also ==
- Severn trow, a sailing vessel with a folding mast, used on the Severn, also used on the Stroudwater Navigation.
