= Farms for City Children =

British farm-experience charity for children

- Formation: 1976; 50 years ago
- Founder: Michael Morpurgo; Clare Morpurgo
- Registration no.: 325120
- Legal status: Registered charity
- Region served: Devon; Gloucestershire; Pembrokeshire
- Website: www.farmsforcitychildren.org

Farms for City Children is a UK registered charity which aims to provide experience of farm and countryside life for over 3,200 inner-city children per year.

== Foundation ==
In 1976, author Michael Morpurgo and his wife, Clare Morpurgo (the oldest daughter of Sir Allen Lane, the founder of Penguin Books), established the charity Farms for City Children, with the primary aim of providing children from inner city areas with experience of the countryside. Clare Morpurgo used her legacy after her father's death to found the charity. The programme involves the children spending a week at a countryside farm, during which they take part in purposeful farm work.

The first children arrived in January 1976 at Nethercott House; the charity now has three farms, in Devon, Gloucestershire and Pembrokeshire. In 1999, the couple were created Members of the Order of the British Empire (MBE) in recognition of these services to youth.

Michael Morpurgo has described how the relationship between young boy with a stammer who came with Farms for City Children to Devon for a week and a horse on the farm was partly responsible for inspiring the novel War Horse.

== Aims and activities ==
The Farms for City Children charity describes itself thus:

Over the years the formula has changed very little. Simply, children are involved in everything necessary to keep the farms going. They learn hands-on where their food comes from, the importance of caring for animals and the land, and the value of working co-operatively as a team. The rewards are, unusually, non-material and self-generated: children discover an active enjoyment in life and a sense of achievement, the effects of which remain with them long after they have waved the farms goodbye.

A group of up to 40 children from urban primary schools, accompanied by four or five teachers, spend 7 days on the farm, during which time the children will be split into three groups. The farm jobs are rotated so that each group does each job at least twice, with the result that the second time around the children feel "more like experienced farmers". Jobs include feeding livestock, mucking out, grooming horses and donkeys, assisting at milking time, beekeeping and working in the vegetable gardens. Naturally, many of the activities are seasonal and can include lambing in spring and making bonfires and pressing apples for juice in the autumn.

== The farms ==
Currently the charity has three farms:

- Nethercott House, just outside the village of Iddesleigh in Devon. The farm is a Grade II listed Victorian building.
- Treginnis Isaf, near St David's in Pembrokeshire, Wales. Treginnis Isaf is leased from the National Trust and is the most westerly farm in Wales.
- Wick Court, Arlingham in Gloucestershire, a Grade II* listed Elizabethan moated Manor House.

== Funding ==
Farms for City Children relies on funding from charitable trusts, foundations and businesses, as well as by individual private donations and community fundraising. The charity subsidises over half the true cost of each child's place, £300 per child; in addition it needs to raise money to maintain the three historic farm properties. Over three farms for each class of 36 children, that is the equivalent of £32,400 a week. The charity's website has a shop which sells merchandise including signed copies of some of Michael Morpurgo's books, with the profits being received by the charity.

== United States ==
An American charity, Farms for City Kids, was set up in 1992 by Karli and Jim Hagedorn, who had learned of Farms for City Children on a visit to the UK. Farms for City Kids has objectives similar to those of Farms for City Children but is not connected or affiliated with it. Its farm in Vermont was purchased in 1992.
