= Eorlingas =

Eorlingas may refer to:

- The Rohirrim, a nation of Men from J. R. R. Tolkien's novel The Lord of the Rings
- The 6th century Anglian tribe after which the village of Arlingham was named
