= Wick Court, Arlingham =

Wick Court
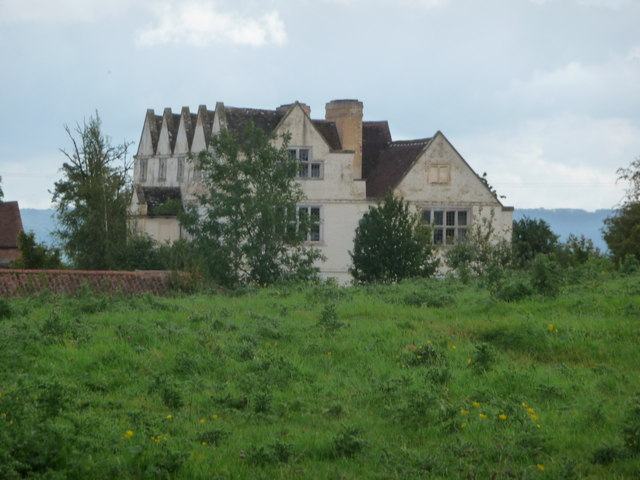
- "a remote and almost unaltered example of an Elizabethan house"

- Location within Gloucestershire
- 51.7923°N 2.3845°W
- Type: House
- Location: Arlingham, Gloucestershire

History
- Built: 14th-17th centuries

Site notes
- Architectural style: Vernacular
- Governing body: Farms for City Children

Listed Building – Grade II*
- Official name: Wick Court, with railings and wall to north
- Designated: 10 January 1955
- Reference no.: 1090581

Listed Building – Grade II
- Official name: Barn at Wick Court and adjoining animal shelter to east
- Designated: 9 December 1986
- Reference no.: 1152698

Wick Court is a country house in the parish of Arlingham, Gloucestershire, England, 0.5 mile east of the hamlet of Overton. It was constructed between the late 14th and the mid-17th centuries. Now a base for the charity Farms for City Children, it operates as a traditional livestock farm providing experience of country life for children from urban areas. Wick Court is a Grade II* listed building.

== History and description ==
The Pevsner Architectural Guide, Gloucestershire: The Vale And The Forest of Dean suggests that the earliest part of the court, the south front, dates from the late 14th century. The house was remodelled and enlarged in the mid-17th century, probably for a Thomas Yate. The site is moated and Historic England records that the court was used as a fishing lodge used by the Lords Berkeley and may have been visited by Elizabeth I. In the 20th century, the court was purchased by the charity, Farms for City Children founded by Clare Morpurgo and her husband, the author Michael Morpurgo. Wick operates as a small-scale traditional livestock farm.

Pevsner describes the north front of the house as the "show" front. It is of five bays and three storeys, with a two-storey porch. The top floor of the house was planned as a long gallery, a common Elizabethan feature, but this was never completed. The Historic England listing record for the court, which notes its Grade II* designation, describes Wick as "a remote and almost unaltered example of an Elizabethan house". The barn and animal shelter to the east of the court has its own Grade II listing.

== Sources ==
- Verey, David; Brooks, Alan (2002) [1970]. Gloucestershire 2: The Vale and the Forest of Dean. The Buildings of England. Yale University Press. ISBN 0-300-09733-6.
