= Purton Hulks =

Boats beached to reinforce the banks of the River Severn, England

Coordinates: 51°44′09″N 2°27′27″W

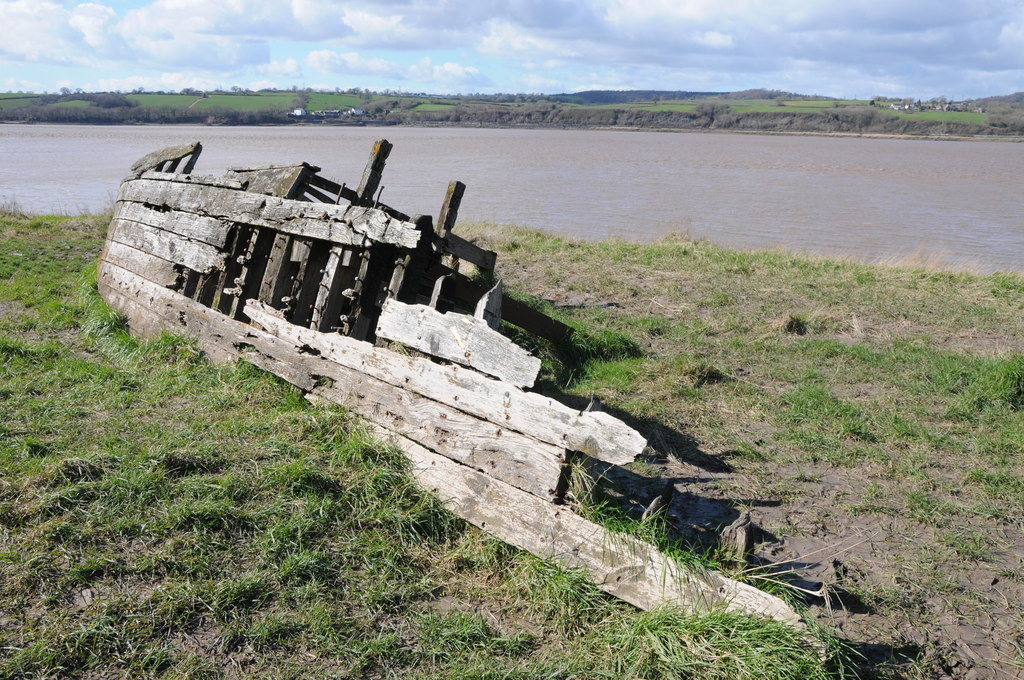
The remains of the Severn Collier (2014)

The Purton Hulks or Purton Ships' Graveyard is a number of abandoned boats and ships, deliberately beached beside the River Severn near Purton in Gloucestershire, England, to reinforce the river banks. Most were beached in the 1950s and are now in a state of considerable decay. The site forms the largest ship graveyard in mainland Britain.

A riverbank collapse in 1909 led to concerns that the barrier between the river and the Gloucester and Sharpness Canal would be breached. Old vessels were run aground and soon filled with water and silt to create a tidal erosion barrier. The vessels included steel barges, Severn trows and concrete ships. The boats came from throughout the British Isles and were built in the second half of the 19th century and the first half of the 20th.

Since 2000, archaeological investigations have been undertaken to find out more about the vessels and their states of decay. Explanatory labels have been provided. One barge has been scheduled as an ancient monument and several are included in the National Register of Historic Vessels.

== History ==
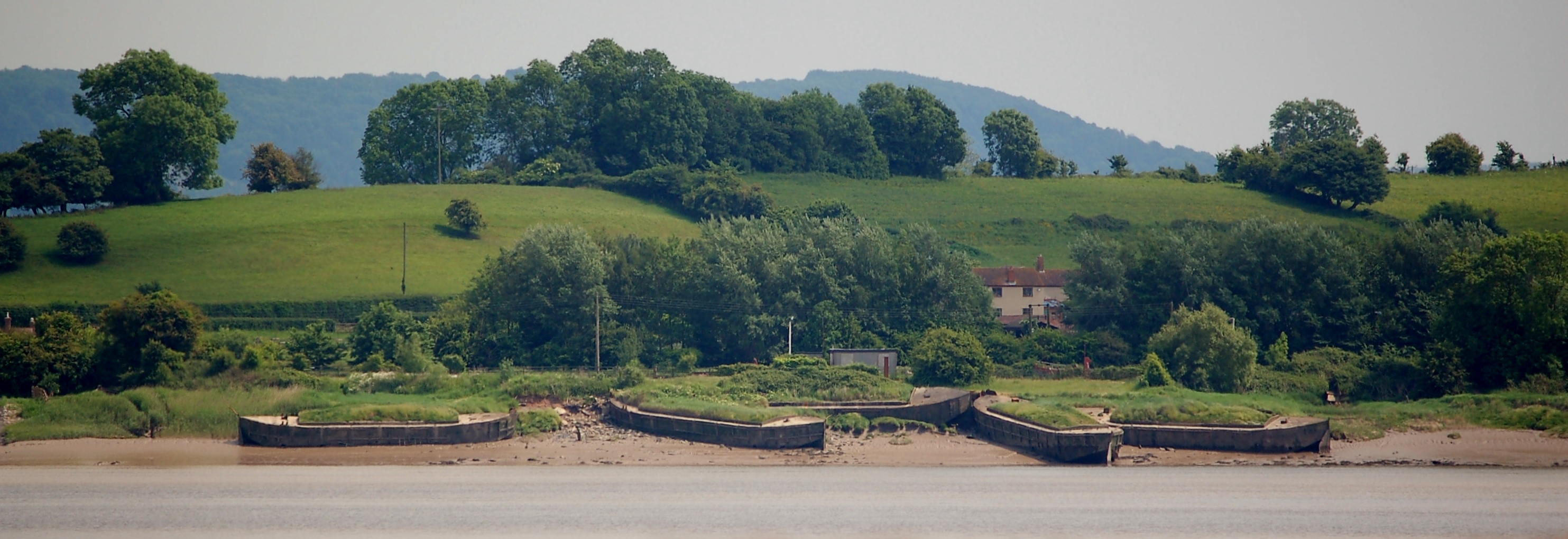
Concrete barges on the foreshore

Purton lies on the southern bank of the River Severn about 1/2 mile (1 km) north of the port of Sharpness. The Severn is the longest river in the United Kingdom, at about 220 miles (354 km) and, with an average discharge of 107 m^{3}/s (3,800 cu ft/s) at Apperley, Gloucestershire, it is the greatest river in terms of water flow in England and Wales.

=== The Gloucester and Sharpness Canal ===
At the site of the Purton Hulks there is less than 50 metres (160 ft) of land between the river and the Gloucester and Sharpness Canal (or Gloucester and Berkeley Canal). The 26.5-kilometre-long (16.5 mi) canal was dug between Gloucester and Sharpness; for much of its length it runs close to the tidal River Severn, but cuts off a significant loop in the river, at a once-dangerous bend near Arlingham. It was once the broadest and deepest canal in the world. Conceived in the Canal Mania period of the late 18th century, the Gloucester and Berkeley Ship Canal scheme was authorised by a 1793 Act of Parliament.

The canal opened in April 1827, having cost £440,000 (equivalent to £40,000,000 in 2025) in the course of its construction. The flood plain of the Severn hereabouts is very flat and so the elevation of the canal does not require any rise over its length. Outside the dock areas at each end, there are no locks. This encouraged the use of the canal for ships larger than on most other British canals, although there were a number of swing bridges to negotiate. As opened the canal was 86 1/2 feet (26.4 m) wide, 18 feet (5.5 m) deep and could take craft of up to 600 tons. In 1905 traffic exceeded one million tons for the first time. Oil was added to the list of cargoes carried by the canal, with bulk oil carriers taking fuel to storage tanks sited to the south of Gloucester.

=== Coastal defences ===
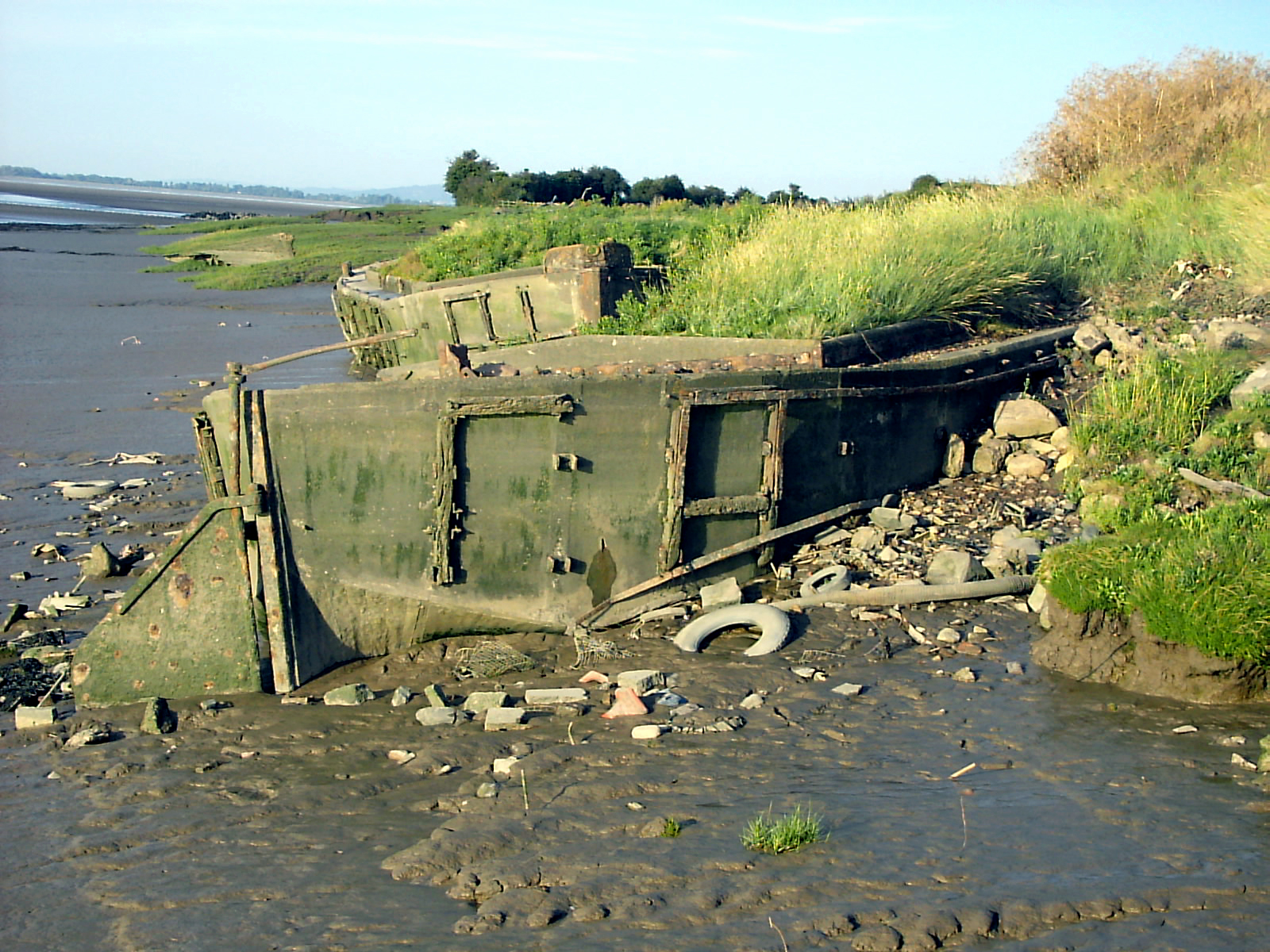
Stern of a ferro-cement barge

The stretch of canal from Sharpness to Purton runs very close to the river. At a high spring tide they were separated by little more than the width of the towpath. The canal also has no locks, and owing to its width, not even any stop locks. Any damage to the canal bank could thus render the entire canal unnavigable.

In 1909, following a collapse in the bank of the river, the canal company's chief engineer Mr A. J. Cullis called for old vessels to be run aground along the bank of the Severn, near Purton, to create a makeshift tidal erosion barrier to reinforce the narrow strip of land between the river and canal. Barges, trows and schooners were "hulked" at high tide, by towing them from the dock at Sharpness and releasing them to be carried up the bank on the tide. Holes were then made in their hulls so that they filled with water, and over time silt has accumulated inside them.

More boats have been added, including the schooner Katherine Ellen which was impounded in 1921 for running guns to the Irish Republican Army (IRA), the Kennet Canal barge Harriett, and ferrocement barges built in World War II. The last boat was beached in 1965. The ground level has built up over the years and some of the more recent additions are lying on top of those which had been beached earlier.

=== Preservation ===
In 1999, a local maritime historian, Paul Barnett, commenced a privately funded research project which saw the site's 86 vessels recorded and recognised as the largest ships' graveyard in mainland Britain. The Nautical Archaeology Society investigated the site in 2008 as part of its Diving into History Project, and carried out laser scanning of the remains. In 2010, British Waterways took control of the site in an attempt to protect it.

The only known surviving Kennet barge, Harriett, which was beached at Purton in 1964, has been scheduled as an ancient monument and included in the National Register of Historic Vessels, as are several ferro concrete barges. The remains of the vessels are not covered by the Protection of Wrecks Act 1973, as they are not on the seabed. But some of the other vessels may not be eligible for scheduling as ancient monuments, under the Ancient Monuments and Archaeological Areas Act 1979, because they are not inland. The issue and the responsibility of various statutory bodies in their protection was debated in the House of Commons in 2009.

== Vessels ==
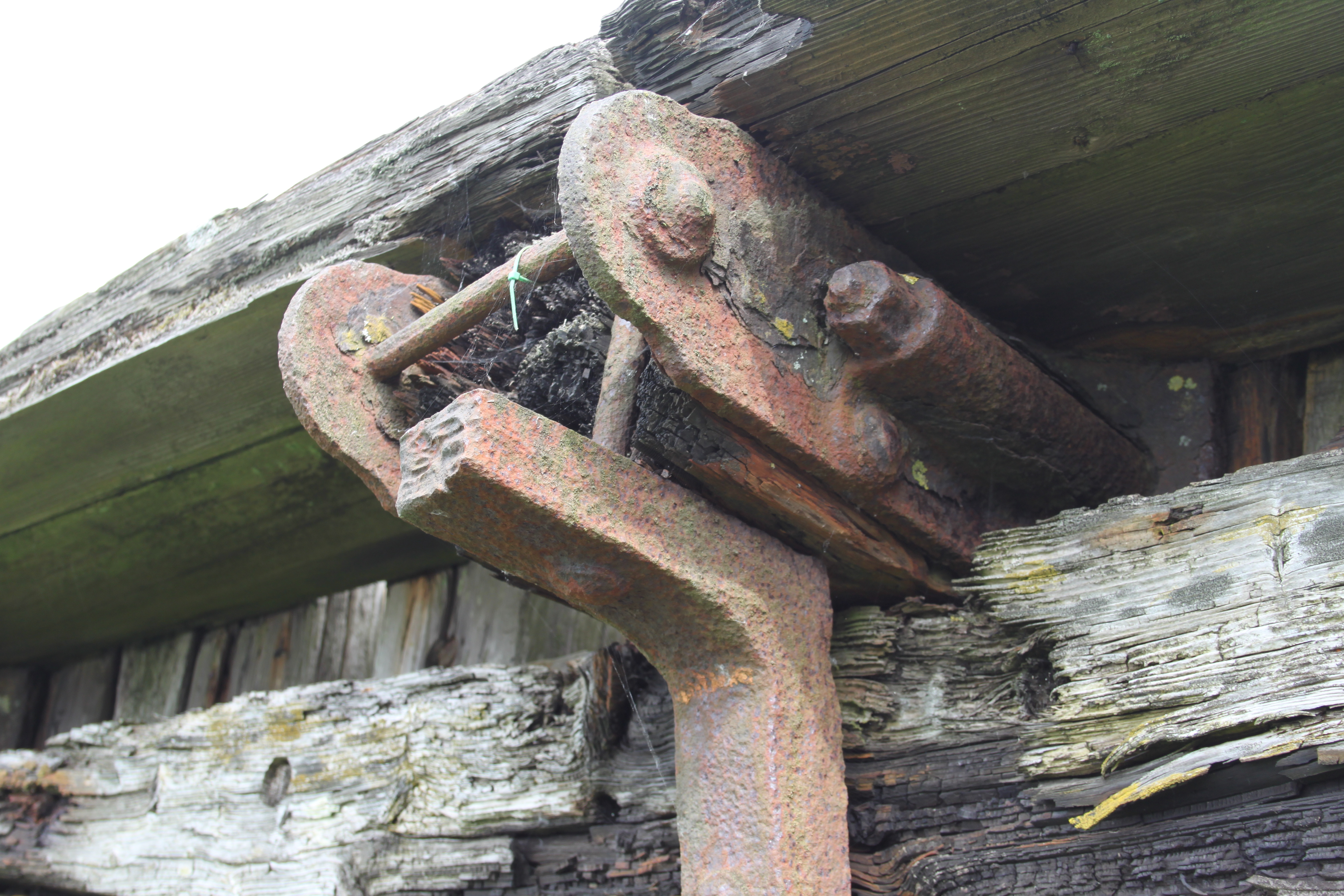
Fell's design of knees on Dispatch

The wooden vessels include examples of the Severn trow. Several concrete ships can also be seen at the site; these are built of steel and ferrocement (reinforced concrete).

Dispatch is notable for its use of, and the sole surviving remains of, Fell's Patent Knees. These were a patent innovation from 1839 by Jonathan Fell of Workington, Cumberland, and were part of the development of the iron and wood composite hull. Ships before this had been built from oak, where the strong curved brackets needed to join the deck into the hull side frames could be found as naturally grown 'knees' from the angles between major branches and the trunk. In the post-Nelsonic era there was a general shortage of shipbuilding timber, particularly oak, one of the few species with strong enough branch attachments to provide knees.

Dispatch's hull is of pine, which has weak branches. A number of iron substitutes were developed, Fell's design being one of the later and more advanced forms. It had two advantages over earlier rigid-forged patterns: it provided a degree of flexibility in storms and, most significantly, could be stressed after the hull had been constructed and launched or even loaded, when the hull was under its working load. Together with the diagonal iron strapping, this rendered Dispatch's hull particularly strong and had allowed her to endure at least two collisions.

List of vessels which make up the Purton Hulks
Name	Photo	Type/Material	Built	Beached	Included in NRHV	Notes
Abbey	Abbey	Dock lighter	1900 by Joseph Barnard of Gloucester	1956	No	85 feet (26 m) long and with a breadth of 19 feet (5.8 m). Hull damaged by fire since 2002.
Ada	Ada	Schooner (Bristol Dandy)	1869 by Thomas Gardner of Bristol	1956	No	The original masts were removed in 1930 and she became a towed barge and then a floating garbage hold. Since beaching, has been damaged by arson.
Alaska		Wood	c. 1880 by Robert Davies of Saul	1939	No	Originally owned by Gloucester pilots.
Arkendale H	Arkendale H and Wastdale H	Steel barge	1937	1960	No	One of two barges which hit the Severn Railway Bridge in fog on 25 October 1960. Two spans of the 22-span steel and cast iron bridge collapsed into the river. Parts of the structure hit the barges, causing the fuel oil and petroleum they were carrying to catch fire; five people died in the incident.
Barge Abbey		Wooden barge	? by Joseph Barnard, Gloucester	c. 1951	No	84 feet (26 m) long.
Barnwood		Steel barge	1913 by Robert Cock & Sons, Richmond Dock, Appledore	c. 1973	No	Gross 59.04 ton Net 56.04 ton
Barry		Dock lighter	Pre 1920s by Joseph Barnard, Gloucester	c. 1951	No	Gross 59.04 ton Net 56.04 ton B.D
Britannia	Britannia	Trow	1878 by Fredrick Charles Hipwood, Gloucester	1944	No	Gross 33.71 ton Net 28.36 ton
Birdlip		Steel barge	1915 by Robert Cock & Sons, Richmond Dock, Appledore	1972	No	85 feet (26 m) long. Gross 59.04 ton Net 56.04 ton B.D
Briton Ferry		Steam grab dredger crane and wood pontoon	1903 by Neath Harbour Commission & (crane) Priestman Bros. of Hull and London	c. 1957	No	Used as a dredger and crane by Neath Harbour Board and then Gloucester Docks Board.
Brockworth		Steel barge	1913 by Robert Cock & Sons, Richmond Dock, Appledore	c. 1972	No	85 feet (26 m) long.
Cam		Steel barge	1905 by Robert Cock & Sons, Richmond Dock, Appledore	c. 1973	No	84 feet (26 m) long. Breadth 19 feet (5.8 m).
Catherine Ellen (Katherine Ellen)	Catherine Ellen	Schooner (2 masted wooden)	1862 by White of Waterford, Ireland	1952	No	Involved in the Irish War of Independence in 1921.
Cranham					No	
Dispatch/New Dispatch	Dispatch	Schooner (two-masted wooden)	1888 by Garmouth James & John Geddie, Kingston on Spey	1961	No	Originally a 120-ton vessel which was 90 feet (27 m) long, it was rebuilt in Gloucester in 1939 and the name changed.
Dursley	Dursley	Dock lighter	1926 by Joseph Barnard of Gloucester	c. 1963	No	Local timber carrier.
Edith	"Edith"	Trow	1901 by William Hurd, Chepstow	c. 1962	No	Transported coal from the Forest of Dean to Bristol, Chepstow and Bridgwater.
Envoy	Envoy	Stroudwater barge			No	
FCB 51		Ferrocement barge	1941 by Wates Building Group Ltd, Barrow-in-Furness	1965	No	
FCB 52		Ferrocement barge	1941 by Wates Building Group Ltd, Barrow-in-Furness	1965	Yes	Built in World War II to provide port lighterage and floating storage facilities in a time when wood and steel were in short supply. In 1990 the boat was removed from Purton by the Gloucester Waterways Museum. She was at Marshfield until 2012 when she was reported sunk.
FCB 67	FCB 67	Ferrocement barge	1941 by Wates Building Group Ltd, Barrow-in-Furness	1962	Yes	
FCB 68	FCB 68	Ferrocement barge	1941 by Wates Building Group Ltd, Barrow-in-Furness	1962	Yes	
FCB 75	FCB 75	Ferrocement barge	1941 by Wates Building Group Ltd, Barrow-in-Furness	1965	Yes	
FCB 76		Ferrocement barge	1941 by Wates Building Group Ltd, Barrow-in-Furness	1965	Yes	
FCB 77	FCB 77	Ferrocement barge	1941 by Wates Building Group Ltd, Barrow-in-Furness	1965	Yes	
FCB 78	FCB 78	Ferrocement barge	1941 by Wates Building Group Ltd, Barrow-in-Furness	1965	Yes	
Forty Ton Flat					No	
Glenby	Glenby	Stroudwater barge			No	
Guide (Shamrock)		Schooner (Wood Brigantine)	1854 by Holman & Kelly, Dartmouth	1950	No	
Harriett	Harriett	Wooden Kennet barge	1905 by Robbins, Lane and Pinnegar of Honeystreet, Pewsey	1964	Yes	Scheduled as an ancient monument.
Higre	Higre	Trow	1876 by Samuel Hipwood, Gloucester	1965	No	
Hopper No6					No	
Huntley	Huntley				No	
Island Maid (Orby)	Island Maid (Orby)	Schooner	1863 by William Hole Shilston & Co, Plymouth	1945	No	Traded with Spain and Mediterranean ports. The wreck was largely destroyed by scrap metal dealers in 1953.
J&AR		Severn trow	1894 Saul	1950s	No	
Jonadab	Jonadab	Severn trow, converted to a motor barge in 1948	1848 Newport		No	
Lighter No. 6		Steel barge	1902 by A. W. Robertson & Co, London	c. 1972	No	
Lighter No. 9		Steel barge	1902 by A. W. Robertson & Co, London	c. 1972	No	
Lighter No. 20		Steel barge	1928 by Charles Hill & Sons of Bristol	c. 1973	No	
Lighter No. 23		Steel barge		c. 1976	No	
Lighter No. 32		Steel barge	1928 by Charles Hill & Sons of Bristol	c. 1976	No	
Mary Ann	Mary Ann		1870 Gloucester		No	
Mary of Brimscombe					No	
Mary of Truro					No	
Matson		Steel barge	1924 by Robert Cock & Sons, Richmond Dock, Appledore	c. 1972	No	
Monarch	Monarch	Severn trow	1890 Gloucester		No	
Newark	Newark	Wooden barge	1896 by Joseph Barnard, Gloucester	c. 1956	No	
Petrus	Petrus				No	
Priory		Stroudwater barge			No	
Rockby	Rockby	Stroudwater barge	c. 1890s by Joseph Barnard, Gloucester	1946	No	Most of remains underground.
Sally (King)	Sally (King)	Schooner	Possibly 1884 in Middlesbrough	1951	No	Little known about the ship's history.
Sandhurst		Steel barge	1924 by Robert Cock & Sons, Richmond Dock, Appledore	c. 1972	No	
Sarah MacDonald (Voltaic)	Sarah MacDonald				No	
Selina Jane			1872 Bridgwater		No	
Severn Collier	Severn Collier	Wooden screw barge	1937	1965	No	Originally motorised and later converted into a towed barge.
Severn Conveyor		Steel tank barge	1930 by Charles Hill & Sons, Bristol	c. 1970	No	
Severn Eagle		'Bird' class steel barge	1935 by Charles Hill & Sons, Bristol	1972	No	
Severn Falcon		'Bird' class steel barge	1935 by Charles Hill & Sons, Bristol	1974	No	
Severn Hawk		'Bird' class steel barge	1935 by Charles Hill & Sons, Bristol	1972	No	
Severn King		Steel Screw Car Ferry	1935 by Beverley, Woodward & Scarr, Yorkshire	1970	No	Used on the Aust Ferry. Withdrawn 1966. In 1970 this boat was in use to support the demolition of the damaged Severn Railway Bridge, when it collided with one of the bridge piers and was damaged. It was then beached and cut up for scrap.
Society		Stroudwater barge			No	
Tirley	Tirley	Stroudwater barge			No	
Tribune					No	
Tuffley		Steel barge	1916 by Robert Cock & Sons, Richmond Dock, Appledore	1972	No	
Victoria					No	
Wastdale H	Arkendale H and Wastdale H	Steel motor barge	1951 by Sharpness Shipyard Ltd, Sharpness	1960	No	One of two barges which hit the Severn Railway Bridge in fog on 25 October 1960. Two spans of the 22-span steel and cast iron bridge collapsed into the river. Parts of the structure hit the barges causing the fuel oil and petroleum they were carrying to catch fire; five people died in the incident.

== Bibliography ==
- Barnett, Louis Paul (2020). Fore and Aft: Lost Ships of the Severn Sea. Gloucestershire: Friends of Purton.
- Barefoot, Ian; Barnett, Paul; McNeil, Euan (2009). "Purton Hulks Recording Project 2008" (PDF). The Nautical Archaeology Society.
- Green, Colin (1999). Severn Traders. Black Dwarf Publications. ISBN 978-0953302826.
- Conway-Jones, Hugh (2013). The Gloucester & Sharpness Canal Through Time. Amberley Publishing. ISBN 978-1-4456-1289-8.
- Hadfield, Charles (1967). The Canals of South West England. David & Charles. ISBN 978-0715341766.
- Huxley, Ron (1984). The rise and fall of the Severn Bridge Railway. ISBN 978-1-84868-033-3.
- Jordan, Christopher (1977). Severn Enterprise. Arthur H Stockwell. ISBN 978-0722309674.
- Mote, Gordon (1986). The Westcountrymen: Ketches & Trows of the Bristol Channel. Badger Books. ISBN 0-946290-12-1.
