= HMS Arlingham =

Minesweeper of the Royal Navy

History

United Kingdom
- Name: HMS Arlingham
- Namesake: Arlingham
- Builder: Camper and Nicholsons
- Launched: 1 April 1953
- Completed: 24 November 1953
- Decommissioned: 3 September 1953
- Fate: Sold to Gibraltar Underwater Contractors 19 September 1978

General characteristics
- Class & type: Ham-class minesweeper
- Displacement: 120 long tons (122 t) standard; 164 long tons (167 t) full load
- Length: 100 ft (30 m) p/p; 106 ft 6 in (32.46 m) o/a
- Beam: 21 ft 4 in (6.50 m)
- Draught: 5 ft 6 in (1.68 m)
- Propulsion: 2 shaft Paxman 12YHAXM diesels; 1,100 bhp (820 kW)
- Speed: 14 knots (16 mph; 26 km/h)
- Complement: 2 officers, 13 ratings
- Armament: 1 × Bofors 40 mm L/60 gun or Oerlikon 20 mm cannon
- Notes: Pennant number(s): M2603 / IMS03

HMS Arlingham was one of 93 ships of the Ham class of inshore minesweepers.

The names of these ships were all chosen from villages ending in -ham. This minesweeper was named after Arlingham in Gloucestershire.

In 1969, HMS Arlingham was rammed by a Spanish Customs launch near Gibraltar, which was later the subject of a formal complaint.
