= Priding =

Hamlet in Gloucestershire, England

Coordinates: 51°47′34″N 2°22′33″W

- Location within Gloucestershire
- Civil parish: Arlingham
- District: Stroud
- Shire county: Gloucestershire
- Region: South West
- Country: England
- Sovereign state: United Kingdom
- Post town: Gloucester
- Postcode district: GL2
- Police: Gloucestershire
- Fire: Gloucestershire
- Ambulance: South Western

Priding is a hamlet in the civil parish of Arlingham, in the Stroud district, in the county of Gloucestershire, England.
