= Severn tunnel (1810) =

Unbuilt railway tunnel in the UK

Coordinates: 51.78770°N 2.44598°W

Severn Tunnel Act 1810
- Act of Parliament
- Parliament of the United Kingdom
- Long title: An Act for making and maintaining a Tunnel or Road under the River Severn, from the Parish of Newnham to the Parish of Arlingham, in the County of Gloucester.
- Citation: 50 Geo. 3. c. cxxiv

Dates
- Royal assent: 24 May 1810

Text of statute as originally enacted

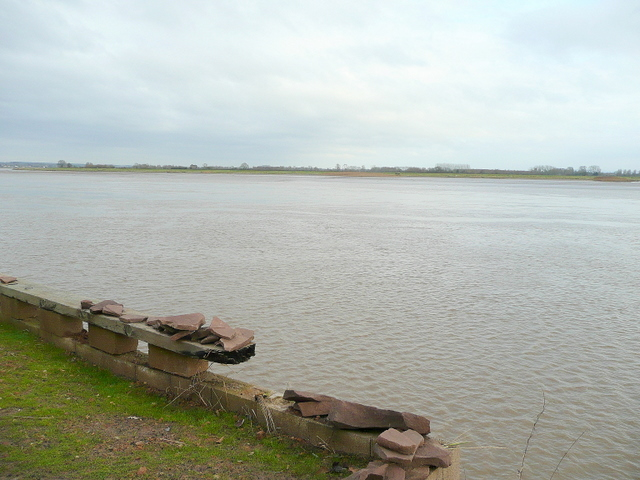
River Severn, near the route of the tunnel

The Severn tunnel of 1810 was an unsuccessful plan for a tramroad tunnel beneath the River Severn. The tunnel was to cross the river at Arlingham Passage, at a location between Newnham on Severn and Bullo Pill on the west bank, to the promontory near Arlingham on the east.

The intention was to take coal from the expanding Forest of Dean collieries. The proprietors of the Bullo Pill Railway Co. had already, in September 1809, completed the Haie Hill tunnel. They acquired the rights to an existing ferry crossing at Newnham Ferry and began construction of the tunnel, from the West bank. This tunnel was to carry road traffic and horse-drawn coal wagons on the tramroad. The bore was to be 13 ft high and 12 ft wide. This tramroad would have been built to match that already constructed onshore, as a four-foot gauge plateway with L-section cast iron rails.

The tunnel was authorised by the Severn Tunnel Act 1810 (50 Geo. 3. c. cxxiv). Work began and the tunnel was extended well under the river. On Friday 13 November 1812 water broke into the tunnel. The tunnel was immediately flooded, and the workmen all managed to escape. Unlike the flooding of the later Severn Tunnel, this flooding was too much for the rudimentary pumps of the day and so work was abandoned.

In 1845, the engineer James Walker prepared a report, River Severn and South Wales Railway, on Brunel's plans for railway bridges across the River Severn. These bridges were to cross from nearby on the Arlingham promontory. Walker's report formed evidence for why the bridge plans were rejected, mostly on the grounds of their effect on shipping. A comment in the report though considered the tunnel plans to be sound and for the rock strata at this location to be amenable to tunneling. This positive report was sufficient to cause Brunel to again consider the crossing the river, this time by tunnel, and he is thought to have consulted with Vignoles on the subject. Brunel would later consider a bridge with a massive 1,100 ft span at this same point.

Some masonry work, including a portion of tunnel lining, can still be seen in a field near Bullo today.
