= Overton, Gloucestershire =

Hamlet in Gloucestershire, England

Coordinates: 51.789°N 2.395°W

Overton
- Location within Gloucestershire
- Civil parish: Arlingham
- District: Stroud
- Shire county: Gloucestershire
- Region: South West
- Country: England
- Sovereign state: United Kingdom
- Post town: Gloucester
- Postcode district: GL2
- Police: Gloucestershire
- Fire: Gloucestershire
- Ambulance: South Western

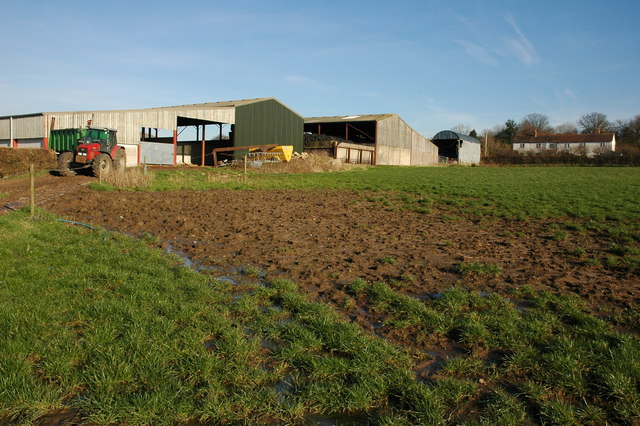
Farm buildings at Overton

Overton is a hamlet in the civil parish of Arlingham, in the Stroud district, in the county of Gloucestershire, England. The name, first recorded in 1584, is of Old English origin and means "upper farmstead". Barrow Hill (62m), above the hamlet, is the highest point on the Arlingham peninsula and offers good views across the Severn to the Forest of Dean.

Wick Court is a Grade II* listed building. It is an "almost unaltered example of an Elizabethan house said to have been used by the Lords Berkeley when catching salmon, and even visited by Queen Elizabeth."
