= List of electoral wards in Gloucestershire =

This is a list of electoral divisions and wards in the ceremonial county of Gloucestershire in South West England. All changes since the re-organisation of local government following the passing of the Local Government Act 1972 are shown. The number of councillors elected for each electoral division or ward is shown in brackets.

== County council ==
=== Gloucestershire ===
Electoral Divisions from 1 April 1974 (first election 12 April 1973) to 2 May 1985:

1. Berkeley (1)
2. Bisley (1)
3. Cam (1)
4. Charlton Kings (1)
5. Cheltenham (All Saints) (1)
6. Cheltenham (College) (1)
7. Cheltenham (Hatherley) (1)
8. Cheltenham (Hesters Way) (1)
9. Cheltenham (Lansdown) (1)
10. Cheltenham (Park) (1)
11. Cheltenham (Pittville) (1)
12. Cheltenham (St Marks) (1)
13. Cheltenham (St Pauls) (1)
14. Cheltenham (St Peters) (1)
15. Cheltenham Rural No. 1 (Winchcombe) (1)
16. Cheltenham Rural No. 2 (1)
17. Cheltenham Rural No. 3 (1)
18. Cheltenham Rural No. 4 (1)
19. Cheltenham Rural No. 5 (1)
20. Cirencester (North) (1)
21. Cirencester (South) (1)
22. Cirencester Rural No. 1 (1)
23. Cirencester Rural No. 2 (1)
24. Dursley (1)
25. East Dean No. 1 (Mitcheldean) (1)
26. East Dean No. 2 (Cinderford) (1)
27. East Dean No. 3 (1)
28. East Dean No. 4 (1)
29. Gloucester (Barnwood) (1)
30. Gloucester (Barton) (1)
31. Gloucester (Eastgate) (1)
32. Gloucester (Hucclecote) (1)
33. Gloucester (Kingsholm) (1)
34. Gloucester (Linden) (1)
35. Gloucester (Longlevens) (1)
36. Gloucester (Matson) (1)
37. Gloucester (Podsmead) (1)
38. Gloucester (Tuffley) (1)
39. Gloucester (Westgate) (1)
40. Gloucester Rural No. 1 (Brockworth) (1)
41. Gloucester Rural No. 2 (Churchdown) (1)
42. Gloucester Rural No. 3 (1)
43. Gloucester Rural No. 4 (1)
44. Lydney (1)
45. Minchinhampton (1)
46. Nailsworth (1)
47. Newent (1)
48. North Cotswold No. 1 (Campden) (1)
49. North Cotswold No. 2 (1)
50. North Cotswold No. 3 (1)
51. Northleach (1)
52. Painswick (1)
53. Stonehouse (1)
54. Stroud East (1)
55. Stroud West (1)
56. Tetbury (1)
57. Tewkesbury (1)
58. Tidenham (1)
59. West Dean No. 1 (1)
60. West Dean No. 2 (1)
61. Wotton-under-Edge (1)

Electoral Divisions from 2 May 1985 to 5 May 2005:

1. All Saints (1)
2. Ashchurch & Twyning (1)
3. Barnwood (1)
4. Barton (1)
5. Berkeley Vale (1)
6. Bishops Cleeve & Swindon (1); electoral division abolished in 1991
7. Bisley (1)
8. Bourton & Stow (1)
9. Brockworth & Hucclecote (1)
10. Brooksdean (1)
11. Cam (1)
12. Charlton Kings (1)
13. Churchdown (1)
14. Cinderford (1)
15. Cirencester North (1)
16. Cirencester South (1)
17. Coleford (1)
18. College (1)
19. Cotswold Edge (1); electoral division abolished in 1991
20. Dursley (1)
21. East Cotswold (1)
22. East Dean (1)
23. Eastgate (1)
24. Hatherley (1) †
25. Hesters Way (1)
26. Hucclecote (1)
27. Kingsholme (1) †
28. Lansdown (1)
29. Linden (1)
30. Longlevens (1) †
31. Lydney (1)
32. Matson (1) †
33. Mid-Tewkesbury (1) †
34. Minchinhampton (1)
35. Moreton-in-the-Marsh (1)
36. Nailsworth (1)
37. Newent (1)
38. North Cotswold (1)
39. Northleach (1)
40. Painswick (1)
41. Park (1)
42. Pittville (1)
43. Podsmead (1)
44. Prestbury (1)
45. Quedgeley (1) †
46. Severn (1) †
47. Severn Dean (1)
48. Severn Vale (1) †
49. South Cotswold (1) †
50. St Marks (1)
51. St Pauls (1)
52. St Peters (1) †
53. Stonehouse (1)
54. Stroud East (1)
55. Stroud West (1)
56. Tetbury (1)
57. Tewkesbury (1)
58. Tidenham (1)
59. Tuffley (1)
60. West Dean (1)
61. Westgate (1) †
62. Winchcombe (1) †
63. Wotton-under-Edge (1)
64. Bishop’s Cleeve (1); new electoral division added in 1991
65. Leckhampton with Up Hatherley (1); new electoral division added in 1991

† minor boundary changes in 1991

Electoral Divisions from 5 May 2005 to 2 May 2013:

1. Abbey (1)
2. All Saints (2)
3. Ashchurch, Cleeve & Oxenton Hill (1)
4. Barnwood (1)
5. Barton & Tredworth (1)
6. Berkeley Vale (1)
7. Bourton (1) †
8. Brockworth (1)
9. Brooksdean (1)
10. Cam & Dursley (2)
11. Chalford (1)
12. Charlton Kings (1)
13. Churchdown Brookfield (1)
14. Churchdown St John's (1)
15. Cinderford (1)
16. Cirencester (2)
17. Cleeve (1)
18. Coleford (1)
19. East Cotswold (1) †
20. Hesters Way & Up Hatherley (2)
21. Hucclecote (1)
22. Lansdown, Park & Warden Hill (2)
23. Longlevens (1)
24. Lydney (1)
25. Mid Dean (1)
26. Moreland (1)
27. Moreton-Stow (1)
28. Nailsworth & Minchinhampton (1) †
29. Newent (1)
30. North Cotswold (1)
31. North Stroud (1)
32. Northleach (1)
33. Oakley, Pittville & Prestbury (2)
34. Pillowell & Littledean (1)
35. Podsmead (1)
36. Quedgeley (2)
37. Robinswood (1)
38. Rodborough (1) †
39. Severn Vale (1)
40. South Cotswold (1)
41. Springbank (1)
42. St Mark's, St Paul’s & St Peter's (2)
43. Stonehouse (1)
44. Stroud East (1)
45. Stroud West (1)
46. Tetbury (1)
47. Tewkesbury (2)
48. Tidenham (1)
49. Upton St Leonards, Bisley & Painswick (1)
50. West Dean (1)
51. Westgate (2)
52. Winchcombe (1)
53. Wotton-under-Edge (1)

† minor boundary changes in 2009

Electoral Divisions from 2 May 2013 to 1 May 2025:

1. Abbey (1)
2. All Saints & Oakley (1)
3. Barnwood & Hucclecote (1)
4. Barton & Tredworth (1)
5. Battledown & Charlton Kings (1)
6. Benhall & Up Hatherley (1)
7. Bishop’s Cleeve (1)
8. Bisley & Painswick (1)
9. Blakeney & Bream (1)
10. Bourton-on-the-Water & Northleach (1)
11. Brockworth (1)
12. Cam Valley (1)
13. Campden-Vale (1)
14. Charlton Park & College (1)
15. Churchdown (1)
16. Cinderford (1)
17. Cirencester Beeches (1)
18. Cirencester Park (1)
19. Coleford (1)
20. Coney Hill & Matson (1)
21. Drybrook & Lydbrook (1)
22. Dursley (1)
23. Fairford & Lechlade on Thames (1)
24. Grange & Kingsway (1)
25. Hardwicke & Severn (1)
26. Hempsted & Westgate (1)
27. Hesters Way & Springbank (1)
28. Highnam (1)
29. Kingsholm & Wotton (1)
30. Lansdown & Park (1)
31. Leckhampton & Warden Hill (1)
32. Longlevens (1)
33. Lydney (1)
34. Minchinhampton (1)
35. Mitcheldean (1)
36. Nailsworth (1)
37. Newent (1)
38. Pittville & Prestbury (1)
39. Quedgeley (1)
40. Rodborough (1)
41. Sedbury (1)
42. South Cerney (1)
43. St Mark’s & St Peter’s (1)
44. St Paul’s & Swindon (1)
45. Stonehouse (1)
46. Stow-on-the-Wold (1)
47. Stroud Central (1)
48. Tetbury (1)
49. Tewkesbury (1)
50. Tewkesbury East (1)
51. Tuffley (1)
52. Winchcombe & Woodmancote (1)
53. Wotton-under-Edge (1)

Electoral Divisions from 1 May 2025 to present:

1. Abbey (1)
2. All Saints & Oakley (1)
3. Barnwood & Hucclecote (1)
4. Barton & Tredworth (1)
5. Battledown & Charlton Kings (1)
6. Benhall & Up Hatherley (1)
7. Bishop’s Cleeve (1)
8. Bisley & Painswick (1)
9. Blakeney & Bream (1)
10. Bourton-on-the-Water & Northleach (1)
11. Brockworth (1)
12. Cam Valley (1)
13. Campden-Vale (1)
14. Charlton Park & College (1)
15. Churchdown (1)
16. Cinderford (1)
17. Cirencester North with Ermin (1)
18. Cirencester Park (1)
19. Coleford (1)
20. Coney Hill & Matson (1)
21. Drybrook & Lydbrook (1)
22. Dursley (1)
23. Fairford & Lechlade on Thames (1)
24. Grange & Kingsway (1)
25. Hardwicke & Severn (1)
26. Haresfield & Upton St Leonards (1)
27. Hempsted & Westgate (1)
28. Hesters Way & Springbank (1)
29. Highnam (1)
30. Kingsholm & Wotton (1)
31. Lansdown & Park (1)
32. Leckhampton & Warden Hill (1)
33. Longlevens (1)
34. Lydney (1)
35. Minchinhampton (1)
36. Mitcheldean (1)
37. Moreton, Stow & the Rissingtons (1)
38. Nailsworth (1)
39. Newent (1)
40. Pittville & St Paul’s (1)
41. Prestbury & Swindon Village (1)
42. Quedgeley (1)
43. Rodborough (1)
44. Sedbury (1)
45. Severn Vale (1)
46. South Cerney (1)
47. St Mark’s & St Peter’s (1)
48. Stonehouse (1)
49. Stroud Central (1)
50. Tetbury (1)
51. Tewkesbury East (1)
52. Tewkesbury West (1)
53. Tuffley & Moreland (1)
54. Winchcombe & Woodmancote (1)
55. Wotton-under-Edge (1)

== Unitary authority council ==
=== South Gloucestershire ===
Wards from 1 April 1996 (first election 4 May 1995) to 6 May 1999:

1. Almondsbury (1)
2. Alveston (2)
3. Bitton (2)
4. Bradley Stoke (North) (2)
5. Bradley Stoke (South) (3)
6. Charfield (1)
7. Chipping Sodbury (1)
8. Cotswold Edge (1)
9. Dodington (2)
10. Downend (3)
11. Filton (Charborough) (1)
12. Filton (Conygre) (1)
13. Filton (Northville) (1)
14. Frampton Cotterell (2)
15. Hanham (3)
16. Kings Chase (3)
17. Ladden Brook (1)
18. Oldbury-on-Severn (1)
19. Oldland Common (2)
20. Parkwall (3)
21. Patchway (3)
22. Pilning & Severn Beach (1)
23. Pucklechurch (1)
24. Rodway (3)
25. Siston (3)
26. Staple Hill (2)
27. Stoke Gifford (North) (1)
28. Stoke Gifford (South) (2)
29. Thornbury North (2)
30. Thornbury South (2)
31. Westerleigh (1)
32. Wick & Abson (1)
33. Winterbourne (3)
34. Woodstock (3)
35. Yate (North West) (1)
36. Yate (North) (2)
37. Yate (South) (2)
38. Yate (West) (1)

Wards from 6 May 1999 to 3 May 2007:

1. Almondsbury (1)
2. Alveston (1)
3. Bitton (1)
4. Boyd Valley (2)
5. Bradley Stoke Baileys Court (1)
6. Bradley Stoke Bowsland (2)
7. Bradley Stoke Sherbourne (2)
8. Charfield (1)
9. Chipping Sodbury (2)
10. Cotswold Edge (1)
11. Dodington (2)
12. Downend (3)
13. Filton (3)
14. Frampton Cotterell (2)
15. Hanham (3)
16. Kings Chase (3)
17. Ladden Brook (1)
18. Longwell Green (2)
19. Oldland Common (2)
20. Parkwall (2)
21. Patchway (3)
22. Pilning & Severn Beach (1)
23. Rodway (3)
24. Severn (1)
25. Siston (3)
26. Staple Hill (2)
27. Stoke Gifford (3)
28. Thornbury North (2)
29. Thornbury South (2)
30. Westerleigh (1)
31. Winterbourne (3)
32. Woodstock (3)
33. Yate Central (2)
34. Yate North (2)
35. Yate West (2)

Wards from 3 May 2007 to 2 May 2019:

1. Almondsbury (1)
2. Bitton (1)
3. Boyd Valley (2)
4. Bradley Stoke Central & Stoke Lodge (2)
5. Bradley Stoke North (1)
6. Bradley Stoke South (2)
7. Charfield (1)
8. Chipping Sodbury (2)
9. Cotswold Edge (1)
10. Dodington (2)
11. Downend (3)
12. Emersons Green (3)
13. Filton (3)
14. Frampton Cotterell (2)
15. Frenchay & Stoke Park (2)
16. Hanham (3)
17. Kings Chase (3)
18. Ladden Brook (1)
19. Longwell Green (2)
20. Oldland Common (2)
21. Parkwall (2)
22. Patchway (3)
23. Pilning & Severn Beach (1)
24. Rodway (3)
25. Severn (1)
26. Siston (1)
27. Staple Hill (2)
28. Stoke Gifford (3)
29. Thornbury North (2)
30. Thornbury South & Alveston (2)
31. Westerleigh (1)
32. Winterbourne (2)
33. Woodstock (3)
34. Yate Central (2)
35. Yate North (3)

Wards from 2 May 2019 to present:

1. Bitton & Oldland Common (2)
2. Boyd Valley (2)
3. Bradley Stoke North (2)
4. Bradley Stoke South (2)
5. Charfield (1)
6. Charlton & Cribbs (3)
7. Chipping Sodbury & Cotswold Edge (2)
8. Dodington (2)
9. Emersons Green (3)
10. Filton (2)
11. Frampton Cotterell (3)
12. Frenchay & Downend (3)
13. Hanham (3)
14. Kingswood (2)
15. Longwell Green (2)
16. New Cheltenham (2)
17. Parkwall & Warmley (2)
18. Patchway Coniston (1)
19. Pilning & Severn Beach (1)
20. Severn Vale (2)
21. Staple Hill & Mangotsfield (3)
22. Stoke Gifford (3)
23. Stoke Park & Cheswick (1)
24. Thornbury (3)
25. Winterbourne (2)
26. Woodstock (2)
27. Yate Central (2)
28. Yate North (3)

== District councils ==
=== Cheltenham ===
Wards from 1 April 1974 (first election 7 June 1973) to 5 May 1983:

Wards from 5 May 1983 to 2 May 2002:

1. Hatherley (); ward abolished in 1991
2. Hatherley & The Reddings (4); new ward added in 1991
3. Leckhampton with Up Hatherley (3); new ward added in 1991
4. Prestbury (3); new ward added in 1991
5. Swindon (1); new ward added in 1991

Wards from 2 May 2002 to 2 May 2024:

1. All Saints (2)
2. Battledown (2)
3. Benhall & The Reddings (2)
4. Charlton Kings (2)
5. Charlton Park (2)
6. College (2)
7. Hesters Way (2)
8. Lansdown (2)
9. Leckhampton (2)
10. Oakley (2)
11. Park (2)
12. Pittville (2)
13. Prestbury (2)
14. St Mark's (2)
15. St Paul's (2)
16. St Peter's (2)
17. Springbank (2)
18. Swindon Village (2)
19. Up Hatherley (2)
20. Warden Hill (2)

Wards from 2 May 2024 to present:

1. All Saints (2)
2. Battledown (2)
3. Benhall, the Reddings & Fiddler’s Green (2)
4. Charlton Kings (2)
5. Charlton Park (2)
6. College (2)
7. Hesters Way (2)
8. Lansdown (2)
9. Leckhampton (2)
10. Oakley (2)
11. Park (2)
12. Pittville (2)
13. Prestbury (2)
14. Springbank (2)
15. St Mark’s (2)
16. St Paul’s (2)
17. St Peter’s (2)
18. Swindon Village (2)
19. Up Hatherley (2)
20. Warden Hill (2)

=== Cotswold ===
Wards from 1 April 1974 (first election 7 June 1973) to 3 May 1979:

Wards from 3 May 1979 to 1 May 2003:

1. Ermin () †

† minor boundary changes in 1991

Wards from 1 May 2003 to 7 May 2015:

1. Ampney-Coln (1)
2. Avening (1)
3. Beacon-Stow (2)
4. Blockley (1)
5. Bourton-on-the-Water (2)
6. Campden-Vale (3)
7. Chedworth (1)
8. Churn Valley (1)
9. Cirencester Beeches (2)
10. Cirencester Chesterton (2)
11. Cirencester Park (2)
12. Cirencester Stratton-Whiteway (2)
13. Cirencester Watermoor (2)
14. Ermin (1)
15. Fairford (2) †
16. Fosseridge (1)
17. Grumbolds Ash (1)
18. Hampton (1)
19. Kempsford-Lechlade (2)
20. Moreton-in-Marsh (2)
21. Northleach (1)
22. Rissingtons (1)
23. Riversmeet (1) †
24. Sandywell (1)
25. Tetbury (3)
26. Thames Head (1)
27. Three Rivers (1)
28. Water Park (3)

† minor boundary changes in 2007

Wards from 7 May 2015 to present:

1. Abbey (1)
2. Blockley (1)
3. Bourton Vale (1)
4. Bourton Village (1)
5. Campden & Vale (2)
6. Chedworth & Churn Valley (1)
7. Chesterton (1)
8. Coln Valley (1)
9. Ermin (1)
10. Fairford North (1)
11. Fosseridge (1)
12. Four Acres (1)
13. Grumbolds Ash with Avening (1)
14. Kemble (1)
15. Lechlade, Kempsford & Fairford South (2)
16. Moreton East (1)
17. Moreton West (1)
18. New Mills (1)
19. Northleach (1)
20. Sandywell (1)
21. Siddington & Cerney Rural (1)
22. South Cerney Village (1)
23. St Michael’s (1)
24. Stow (1)
25. Stratton (1)
26. Tetbury East & Rural (1)
27. Tetbury Town (1)
28. Tetbury with Upton (1)
29. The Ampneys & Hampton (1)
30. The Beeches (1)
31. The Rissingtons (1)
32. Watermoor (1)

=== Forest of Dean ===
Wards from 1 April 1974 (first election 7 June 1973) to 5 May 1983:

Wards from 5 May 1983 to 1 May 2003:

1. Bream (2); changed to (3) in 1999
2. Broadwell (3); changed to (2) in 1999
3. Coleford (3); changed to (5) in 1999

Wards from 1 May 2003 to 2 May 2019:

1. Alvington, Aylburton & West Lydney (2)
2. Awre (1)
3. Berry Hill (1)
4. Blaisdon & Longhope (1)
5. Bream (2)
6. Bromesberrow & Dymock (1)
7. Christchurch & English Bicknor (1)
8. Churcham & Huntley (1)
9. Cinderford East (2)
10. Cinderford West (3)
11. Coleford Central (2)
12. Coleford East (3)
13. Hartpury (1)
14. Hewelsfield & Woolaston (1)
15. Littledean & Ruspidge (2)
16. Lydbrook & Ruardean (3)
17. Lydney East (3)
18. Lydney North (1)
19. Mitcheldean & Drybrook (3)
20. Newent Central (2)
21. Newland & St Briavels (2)
22. Newnham & Westbury (2)
23. Oxenhall & Newent North East (1)
24. Pillowell (2)
25. Redmarley (1)
26. Tibberton (1)
27. Tidenham (3)

Wards from 2 May 2019 to present:

1. Berry Hill (2)
2. Bream (2)
3. Cinderford East (2)
4. Cinderford West (2)
5. Coleford (3)
6. Dymock (1)
7. Hartpury & Redmarley (2)
8. Longhope & Huntley (2)
9. Lydbrook (1)
10. Lydney East (3)
11. Lydney North (1)
12. Lydney West & Aylburton (1)
13. Mitcheldean, Ruardean & Drybrook (3)
14. Newent & Taynton (3)
15. Newland & Sling (1)
16. Newnham (2)
17. Pillowell (1)
18. Ruspidge (1)
19. St. Briavels (1)
20. Tidenham (3)
21. Westbury-on-Severn (1)

=== Gloucester ===
Wards from 1 April 1974 (first election 7 June 1973) to 3 May 1979:

Wards from 3 May 1979 to 2 May 2002:

1. Barnwood (); changed to (3) in 1998
2. Hucclecote (); changed to (3) in 1998
3. Kingsholm () †
4. Longlevens () †
5. Matson () †
6. Westgate () †
7. Quedgeley (2); new ward added in 1991
8. Abbeymead (3); new ward added in 1998

† minor boundary changes in 1991

Wards from 2 May 2002 to 5 May 2016:

1. Abbey (3)
2. Barnwood (3)
3. Barton & Tredworth (3)
4. Elmbridge (2)
5. Grange (2)
6. Hucclecote (3)
7. Kingsholm & Wotton (2)
8. Longlevens (3)
9. Matson & Robinswood (3)
10. Moreland (3)
11. Podsmead (1)
12. Quedgeley Fieldcourt (2)
13. Quedgeley Severn Vale (2)
14. Tuffley (2)
15. Westgate (2)

Wards from 5 May 2016 to present:

1. Abbeydale (2)
2. Abbeymead (2)
3. Barnwood (2)
4. Barton & Tredworth (3)
5. Coney Hill (1)
6. Elmbridge (2)
7. Grange (2)
8. Hucclecote (2)
9. Kingsholm & Wotton (2)
10. Kingsway (2)
11. Longlevens (3)
12. Matson & Robinswood (3)
13. Moreland (3)
14. Podsmead (1)
15. Quedgeley Fieldcourt (2)
16. Quedgeley Severn Vale (2)
17. Tuffley (2)
18. Westgate (3)

=== Stroud ===
Wards from 1 April 1974 (first election 7 June 1973) to 5 May 1983:

Wards from 5 May 1983 to 2 May 2002:

1. Parklands () †
2. Quedgeley & Hardwicke (); ward abolished in 1991
3. Hardwicke (2); new ward added in 1991

† minor boundary changes in 1991

Wards from 2 May 2002 to 5 May 2016:

1. Amberley & Woodchester (1) †
2. Berkeley (2)
3. Bisley (1)
4. Cainscross (3)
5. Cam East (2)
6. Cam West (2)
7. Central (1)
8. Chalford (3)
9. Coaley & Uley (1)
10. Dursley (3)
11. Eastington & Standish (1)
12. Farmhill & Paganhill (1)
13. Hardwicke (2)
14. Kingswood (1)
15. Minchinhampton (2) †
16. Nailsworth (3) †
17. Over Stroud (1); renamed Randwick, Whiteshill & Ruscombe in 2009
18. Painswick (2)
19. Rodborough (2)
20. Severn (2)
21. Slade (1)
22. Stonehouse (3)
23. The Stanleys (2)
24. Thrupp (1)
25. Trinity (1)
26. Uplands (1)
27. Upton St Leonards (1)
28. Vale (1)
29. Valley (1)
30. Wotton-under-Edge (3)

† minor boundary changes in 2008

Wards from 5 May 2016 to present:

1. Amberley & Woodchester (1)
2. Berkeley Vale (3)
3. Bisley (1)
4. Cainscross (3)
5. Cam East (2)
6. Cam West (2)
7. Chalford (3)
8. Coaley & Uley (1)
9. Dursley (3)
10. Hardwicke (3)
11. Kingswood (1)
12. Minchinhampton (2)
13. Nailsworth (3)
14. Painswick & Upton (3)
15. Randwick, Whiteshill & Ruscombe (1)
16. Rodborough (2)
17. Severn (2)
18. Stonehouse (3)
19. Stroud Central (1)
20. Stroud Farmhill & Paganhill (1)
21. Stroud Slade (1)
22. Stroud Trinity (1)
23. Stroud Uplands (1)
24. Stroud Valley (1)
25. The Stanleys (2)
26. Thrupp (1)
27. Wotton-under-Edge (3)

=== Tewkesbury ===
Wards from 1 April 1974 (first election 7 June 1973) to 5 May 1983:

Wards from 5 May 1983 to 1 May 2003:

1. Bishop’s Cleeve South () †
2. Cleeve Hill () †
3. Coombe Hill () †
4. De Winton () †
5. Leckhampton with Up Hatherley (); ward abolished in 1991
6. Prestbury St Mary's (); ward abolished in 1991
7. Prestbury St Nicholas & Swindon (); ward abolished in 1991
8. Shurdington () †

† minor boundary changes in 1991

Wards from 1 May 2003 to 2 May 2019:

1. Ashchurch with Walton Cardiff (2)
2. Badgeworth (1)
3. Brockworth (3)
4. Churchdown Brookfield (2)
5. Churchdown St John's (3)
6. Cleeve Grange (1)
7. Cleeve Hill (2)
8. Cleeve St Michael's (2)
9. Cleeve West (2)
10. Coombe Hill (2)
11. Highnam with Haw Bridge (2)
12. Hucclecote (1)
13. Innsworth with Down Hatherley (1)
14. Isbourne (1)
15. Northway (2)
16. Oxenton Hill (1)
17. Shurdington (1)
18. Tewkesbury Newtown (1)
19. Tewkesbury Prior’s Park (2)
20. Tewkesbury Town with Mitton (2)
21. Twyning (1)
22. Winchcombe (3)

Wards from 2 May 2019 to present:

1. Badgeworth (1)
2. Brockworth East (2)
3. Brockworth West (2)
4. Churchdown Brookfield with Hucclecote (3)
5. Churchdown St John's (3)
6. Cleeve Grange (1)
7. Cleeve Hill (2)
8. Cleeve St Michael's (2)
9. Cleeve West (2)
10. Highnam with Haw Bridge (2)
11. Innsworth (2)
12. Isbourne (2)
13. Northway (2)
14. Severn Vale North (1)
15. Severn Vale South (1)
16. Shurdington (1)
17. Tewkesbury East (2)
18. Tewkesbury North & Twyning (2)
19. Tewkesbury South (2)
20. Winchcombe (3)

== Former county council ==
=== Avon ===
Electoral Divisions from 1 April 1974 (first election 12 April 1973) to 7 May 1981:

1. Axbridge No. 1 (1)
2. Axbridge No. 2 (1)
3. Bath No. 1 (1)
4. Bath No. 2 (1)
5. Bath No. 3 (1)
6. Bath No. 4 (1)
7. Bath No. 5 (1)
8. Bath No. 6 (1)
9. Bath No. 7 (1)
10. Bathavon No. 1 (1)
11. Bathavon No. 2 (1)
12. Bitton (1)
13. Bristol Avon (1)
14. Bristol Bedminster (1)
15. Bristol Bishopston (1)
16. Bristol Bishopsworth (1)
17. Bristol Brislington (1)
18. Bristol Cabot (1)
19. Bristol Clifton (1)
20. Bristol District (1)
21. Bristol Durdham (1)
22. Bristol Easton (1)
23. Bristol Eastville (1)
24. Bristol Henbury (2)
25. Bristol Hengrove (2)
26. Bristol Hillfields (1)
27. Bristol Horfield (1)
28. Bristol Knowle (1)
29. Bristol Redland (1)
30. Bristol Somerset (1)
31. Bristol Southmead (1)
32. Bristol Southville (1)
33. Bristol Ss Philip & Jacob (1)
34. Bristol St George East (1)
35. Bristol St George West (1)
36. Bristol St Paul (1)
37. Bristol Stapleton (2)
38. Bristol Stockwood (2)
39. Bristol Westbury-on-Trym (2)
40. Bristol Windmill Hill (1)
41. Clevedon (1)
42. Clutton No. 1 (1)
43. Clutton No. 2 (1)
44. Keynsham East (1)
45. Keynsham West (1)
46. Kingswood No. 1 (1)
47. Kingswood No. 2 (1)
48. Long Ashton No. 1 (1)
49. Long Ashton No. 2 (1)
50. Long Ashton No. 3 (1)
51. Mangotsfield No. 1 (1)
52. Mangotsfield No. 2 (1)
53. Norton/Radstock (1)
54. Portishead (1)
55. Siston (1)
56. Sodbury No. 1 (1)
57. Sodbury No. 2 (1)
58. Sodbury No. 3 (1)
59. Sodbury No. 4 (1)
60. Sodbury No. 5 (1)
61. Thornbury No. 1 (1)
62. Thornbury No. 2 (1)
63. Thornbury No. 3 (1)
64. Weston-super-Mare No. 1 (1)
65. Weston-super-Mare No. 2 (1)
66. Weston-super-Mare No. 3 (1)
67. Weston-super-Mare No. 4 (1)

Electoral Divisions from 7 May 1981 to 1 April 1996 (county abolished):

1. Ashley (1)
2. Avonmouth (1)
3. Bath Central (1)
4. Bath North East (1)
5. Bath North West (1)
6. Bath South (1)
7. Bath South East (1)
8. Bath South West (1)
9. Bath West (1)
10. Bathavon (1)
11. Bedminster (1)
12. Bishopston (1)
13. Bishopsworth (1)
14. Bitton (1)
15. Brislington East (1)
16. Brislington West (1)
17. Cabot (1)
18. Chew Valley (1)
19. Clevedon (1)
20. Clifton (1)
21. Cotham (1)
22. Downend (1)
23. Easton (1)
24. Eastville (1)
25. Filton (1)
26. Filwood (1)
27. Frome Vale (1)
28. Gordano Valley (1)
29. Hartcliffe (1)
30. Henbury (1)
31. Hengrove (1)
32. Henleaze (1)
33. Hillfields (1)
34. Horfield (1)
35. Keynsham East (1)
36. Keynsham West (1)
37. Kings Chase (1)
38. Kingsweston (1)
39. Knowle (1)
40. Ladden Brook (1)
41. Lawrence Hill (1)
42. Lockleaze (1)
43. Longwell Green (1)
44. Midsomer Norton (1)
45. Mount Hill (1)
46. Nailsea (1)
47. Patchway (1)
48. Portishead (1)
49. Priory (1)
50. Radstock (1)
51. Redland (1)
52. Rodway (1)
53. Severn Vale (1)
54. Siston (1)
55. Sodbury (1)
56. Southmead (1)
57. Southville (1)
58. St George East (1)
59. St George West (1)
60. Stockwood (1)
61. Stoke Bishop (1)
62. The Combe (1)
63. Thornbury (1)
64. Westbury-on-Trym (1)
65. Weston East (1)
66. Weston North (1)
67. Weston South (1)
68. Weston West (1)
69. Whitchurch Park (1)
70. Wick (1)
71. Windmill Hill (1)
72. Winscombe & Wrington Vale (1)
73. Winterbourne (1)
74. Worle (1)
75. Yate (1)
76. Yatton & Yeo Moor (1)

== Former district councils ==
=== Kingswood ===
Wards from 1 April 1974 (first election 7 June 1973) to 6 May 1976:

Wards from 6 May 1976 to 7 May 1987:

Wards from 7 May 1987 to 1 April 1996 (district abolished):

1. Badminton (1)
2. Bitton North Common (2)
3. Bitton Oldland Common (2)
4. Bitton South (1)
5. Blackhorse (1)
6. Bromley Heath (3)
7. Chase (3)
8. Chiphouse (3)
9. Downend (3)
10. Forest (3)
11. Hanham (3)
12. Hanham Abbots East (1)
13. Hanham Abbots West (2)
14. Mangotsfield (3)
15. New Cheltenham (3)
16. Oldland Barrs Court (2)
17. Oldland Cadbury Heath (3)
18. Oldland Longwell Green (2)
19. Siston (1)
20. Soundwell (2)
21. Springfield (1)
22. Staple Hill (2)
23. Woodstock (3)

=== Northavon ===
Wards from 1 April 1974 (first election 7 June 1973) to 6 May 1976:

Wards from 6 May 1976 to 1 April 1996 (district abolished):

== Electoral wards by constituency ==
Wards as they existed on 1 December 2020.

=== Bristol North East (part) ===
South Gloucestershire: Kingswood; New Cheltenham; Staple Hill & Mangotsfield; Woodstock.

=== Cheltenham ===
Cheltenham: All Saints; Battledown; Benhall & the Reddings; Charlton Kings; Charlton Park; College; Hesters Way; Lansdown; Leckhampton; Oakley; Park; Pittville; St. Mark’s; St. Paul’s; St. Peter’s; Up Hatherley; Warden Hill.

=== Filton and Bradley Stoke ===
South Gloucestershire: Bradley Stoke North; Bradley Stoke South; Charlton & Cribbs; Emersons Green; Filton; Frenchay & Downend; Patchway Coniston; Stoke Gifford; Stoke Park & Cheswick; Winterbourne.

=== Forest of Dean ===
Forest of Dean: Berry Hill; Bream; Cinderford East; Cinderford West; Coleford; Dymock; Hartpury & Redmarley; Longhope & Huntley; Lydbrook; Lydney East; Lydney North; Lydney West & Aylburton; Mitcheldean, Ruardean & Drybrook; Newent & Taynton; Newland & Sling; Newnham; Pillowell; Ruspidge; St. Briavels; Tidenham; Westbury-on-Severn.

Tewkesbury: Highnam with Haw Bridge.

=== Gloucester ===
Gloucester: Abbeydale; Abbeymead; Barnwood; Barton & Tredworth; Coney Hill; Grange; Hucclecote; Kingholm & Wotton; Kingsway; Matson & Robinswood; Moreland; Podsmead; Quedgeley Fieldcourt; Quedgeley Severn Vale; Tuffley; Westgate.

=== North Cotswolds ===
Cotswold: Blockley; Bourton Vale; Bourton Village; Campden & Vale; Chedworth & Churn Valley; Coln Valley; Ermin; Fosseridge; Moreton East; Moreton West; Northleach; Sandywell; Stow; The Rissingtons.

Stroud: Bisley; Hardwicke; Minchinhampton; Painswick & Upton.

Tewkesbury: Badgeworth; Brockworth East; Brockworth West; Churchdown Brookfield with Hucclecote; Churchdown St. John’s; Shurdington.

=== North East Somerset and Hanham (part) ===
South Gloucestershire: Bitton & Oldland Common; Hanham; Longwell Green; Parkwall & Warmley.

=== South Cotswolds (part) ===
Cotswold: Abbey; Chesteron; Fairford North; Four Acres; Grumbolds Ash with Avening; Kemble; Lechlade, Kempsford & Fairford South; New Mills; St. Michael’s; Siddington & Cerney Rural; South Cerney Village; Stratton; Tetbury East & Rural; Tetbury Town; Tetbury with Upton; The Ampneys & Hampton; The Beeches; Watermoor.

Stroud: Kingswood.

=== Stroud ===
Stroud: Amberley & Woodchester; Berkeley Vale; Cainscross; Cam East; Cam West; Chalford; Coaley & Uley; Dursley; Nailsworth; Randwick, Whiteshill & Ruscombe; Rodborough; Severn; Stonehouse; Stroud Central; Stroud Farmhill & Paganhill; Stroud Slade; Stroud Trinity; Stroud Uplands; Stroud Valley; The Stanleys; Thrupp; Wotton-under-Edge.

=== Tewkesbury ===
Cheltenham: Prestbury; Springbank; Swindon Village.

Gloucester: Elmbridge; Longlevens.

Tewkesbury: Cleeve Grange; Cleeve Hill; Cleeve St. Michael’s; Cleeve West; Innsworth; Isbourne; Northway; Severn Vale North; Severn Vale South; Tewkesbury East; Tewkesbury North & Twyning; Tewkesbury South; Winchcombe.

=== Thornbury and Yate ===
South Gloucestershire: Boyd Valley; Charfield; Chipping Sodbury & Cotswold Edge; Dodington; Frampton Cotterell; Pilning & Severn Beach; Severn Vale; Thornbury; Yate Central; Yate North.

== See also ==
- List of parliamentary constituencies in Gloucestershire
