= Allen Lane =

British publisher (1902–1970)

Sir Allen Lane CH
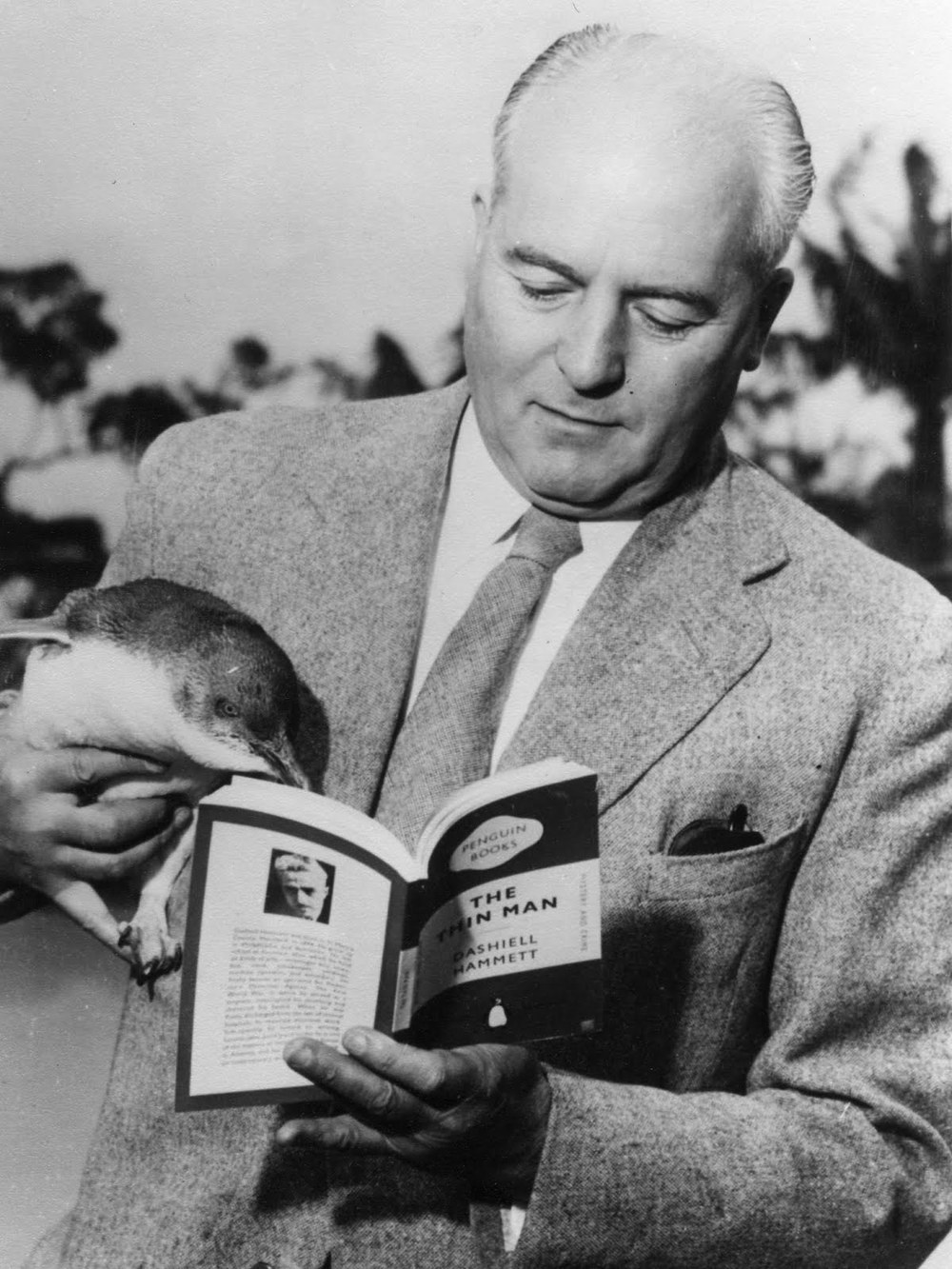
- Lane at London Zoo, 1965
- Born: Allen Lane Williams; 21 September 1902; Bristol, England
- Died: 7 July 1970 (aged 67); Northwood, London, England
- Burial place: St Nectan's Church, Hartland
- Occupation: Publisher
- Known for: Founder of Penguin Books
- Spouse: Lady Letitia Lucy Orr (m. 1941)
- Children: 3, including Clare Morpurgo
- Relatives: John Lane (uncle)
- Awards: Knighthood (1952); Member of the Order of the Companions of Honour (1969); Albert Medal (1969)

Sir Allen Lane CH (born Allen Lane Williams; 21 September 1902 – 7 July 1970) was a British publisher who together with his brothers Richard and John Lane founded Penguin Books in 1935, bringing high-quality paperback fiction and non-fiction to the mass market.

In 1967 he started a hardback imprint under his own name, Allen Lane.

== Early life and family ==
Allen Lane Williams was born in Bristol, to Camilla (née Lane) and Samuel Williams, and studied at Bristol Grammar School. In 1919 he joined the publishing company Bodley Head as an apprentice to his uncle and founder of the company John Lane. In the process, he and the rest of his family changed their surname to Lane to retain the childless John Lane's company as a family firm.

Lane married Letitia Lucy Orr, daughter of Sir Charles Orr, on 28 June 1941 and had three daughters: Clare, Christine, and Anna. He was knighted in 1952.

== Career as a publisher ==
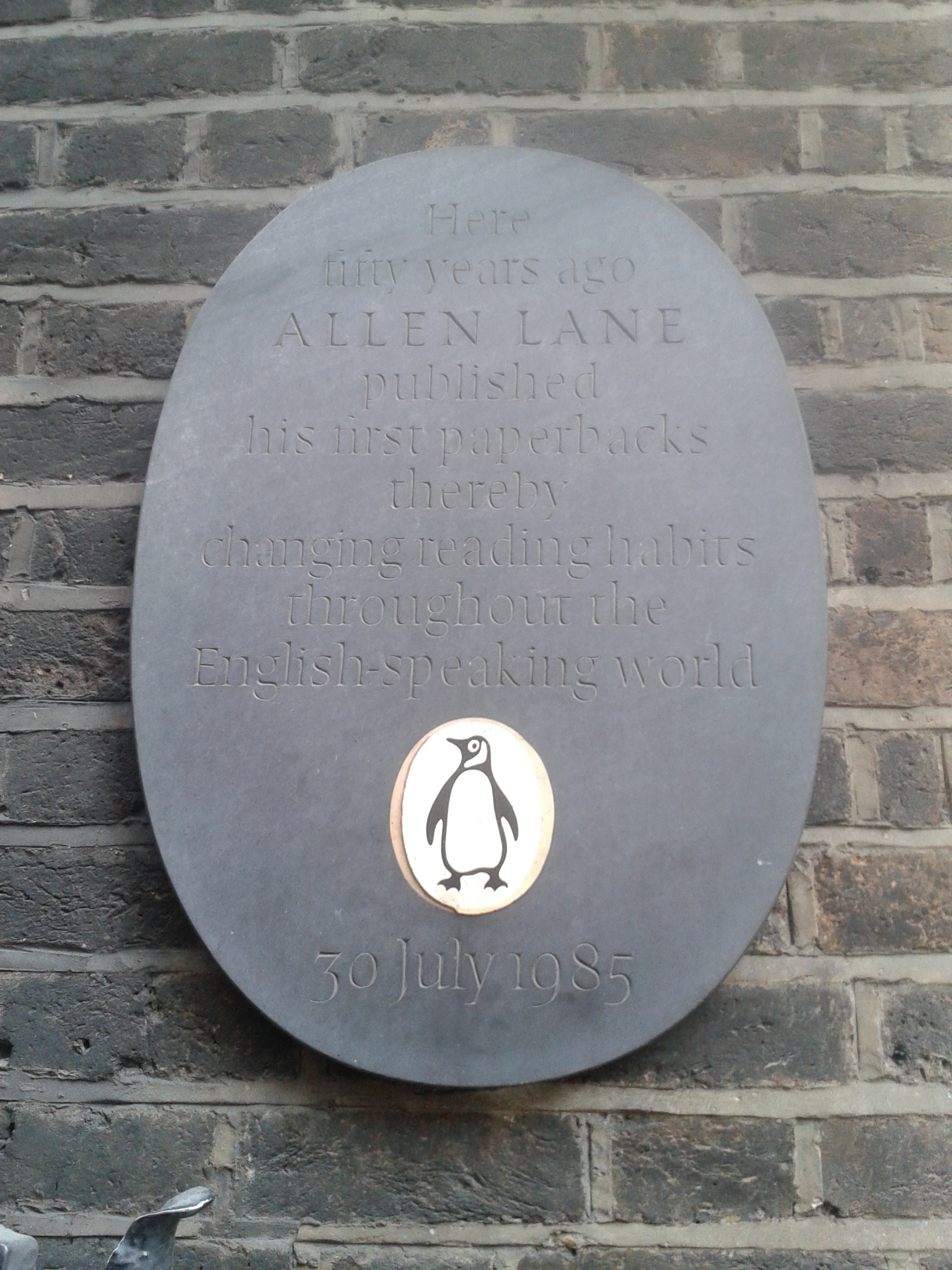
The plaque marking the fiftieth anniversary of the founding of Penguin Books by Allen Lane at 8 Vigo Street

He rose quickly at Bodley Head, becoming managing editor in 1925 following the death of his uncle. After conflict with the board of directors who were wary at first—for fear of being prosecuted—of publishing James Joyce's controversial book Ulysses, Lane, together with his brothers Richard and John, founded Penguin Books in 1935 as part of the Bodley Head.

Penguin Books became a separate company the following year. The legend goes that on a train journey back from visiting Agatha Christie in 1934, Lane found himself at Exeter St Davids station with nothing available worth reading. He conceived of paperback editions of literature of proven quality which would be cheap enough to be sold from a vending machine; the first was set up outside Henderson's in Charing Cross Road and dubbed the "Penguincubator". Lane was also well aware of the Hamburg publisher Albatross Books and adopted many of its innovations.

Most booksellers and authors were against the idea of paperbacks. They believed that paperbacks would result in individuals spending less money on books. Lane was very stubborn when it came to his company; he operated mainly on intuition and imagination. "He thrived in an atmosphere of crisis and came most fully alive under the challenge of great dilemmas." He was a creative genius in that once he had an idea he would not stop until it came to fruition. Once he decided on creating paperbacks he set about in deciding what the books should look like and finding a name. He had decided that the books would be reprints so he also needed to approach other publishers to see if they and their authors would be willing to sublease the rights of the books. He was quoted as saying, "I have never been able to understand why cheap books should not also be well designed, for good design is no more expensive than bad."

Edward Young designed the horizontal bands and used Gill Sans Bold for the title's lettering. He was also sent to the Zoo in Regents Park to sketch penguins for the cover. Allen Lane wanted a cover design that was consistent and easily recognisable. In 1937 the font was changed to Times New Roman. His Pelican Books were non-fiction books. Penguins were meant to entertain while Pelicans were meant to enlighten. In the 1950s his company had grown so much that it had major outposts in both Australia and the United States. Lane's management style put him and the individuals in charge in his United States office at odds. These individuals eventually left Penguin Books and started their own publishing companies: Bantam Books and New American Library.

The paperback venture was extremely successful, and he expanded into other areas such as Pelican Books in 1937, Puffin Books in 1940 and the Penguin Classics series in 1945. Lane was responsible for the decision to publish an unexpurgated edition of D. H. Lawrence's Lady Chatterley's Lover as a means of testing the Obscene Publications Act 1959.

In 1965, during an attempt by chief editor Tony Godwin and the board of directors to remove him, Lane stole and burnt the entire print run of the French cartoonist Siné's book Massacre, which was reportedly deeply offensive.

Lane dismissed Godwin, and retained control of Penguin, but was forced to retire shortly afterwards after being diagnosed with bowel cancer. He died in 1970 at Northwood, Middlesex.

== Legacy ==
In 2010, Penguin Random House Canada launched an imprint named for Allen Lane to publish prestige non-fiction by established authors.
