= Clare Morpurgo =

British philanthropist

Clare, Lady Morpurgo MBE (née Lane) is a British philanthropist. She is the wife of author Sir Michael Morpurgo and the eldest daughter of Sir Allen Lane, founder of Penguin Books.

Morpurgo founded the charity Farms for City Children in 1974. She and her husband are deeply involved with the charity. She is also a trustee of The Allen Lane Foundation, a grant-making charity.

She and Michael Morpurgo co-authored Wherever My Wellies Take Me (2012).

She was awarded an Honorary Fellowship by the University of Chichester in 2014.
