= Arlingham =

Village in Gloucestershire, England

Coordinates: 51.796°N 2.424°W

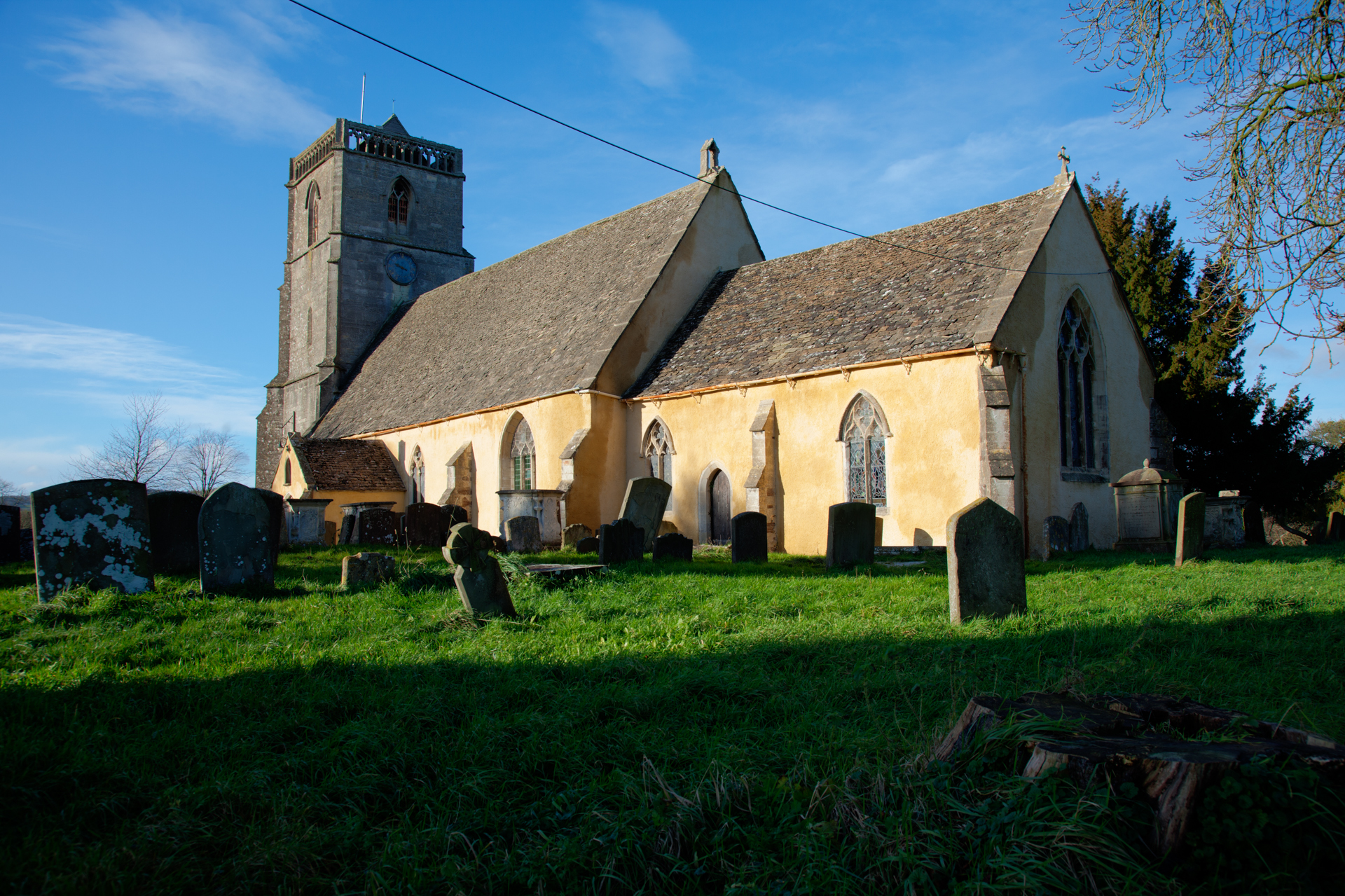
- St Mary's Church, Arlingham.

- Location within Gloucestershire
- Population: 533 (2021)
- OS grid reference: SO7010
- Civil parish: Arlingham
- District: Stroud
- Shire county: Gloucestershire
- Region: South West
- Country: England
- Sovereign state: United Kingdom
- Post town: Gloucester
- Postcode district: GL2
- Dialling code: 01452
- Police: Gloucestershire
- Fire: Gloucestershire
- Ambulance: South Western
- UK Parliament: Stroud

Arlingham is a village and civil parish in the Stroud District of Gloucestershire, England. The 2021 Census recorded a parish population of 533 (271 males, 262 females (129 in the age range 0-17, 289 18-64year olds and 115 65+) with 183 Households). The parish contains the hamlets of Milton End, Overton and Priding. The next parish to the east is Fretherne with Saul.

== Geography ==
Arlingham lies at the western end of the horseshoe loop of the River Severn, known as the "Horseshoe Bend", looking across the water to Newnham on Severn and the Forest of Dean. Access to Arlingham is across Fretherne bridge over the Gloucester and Sharpness Canal, or Sandfield Bridge at Saul Junction. Having the canal on one side and the River Severn on three sides of the parish and a single lane connecting it to the villages to the East, it has developed a distinct identity. Its rural character is still maintained, having some ten working farms with dairy and beef herds and arable land. Although close to the river, unlike areas upriver of Gloucester, Arlingham does not have a high flood risk.

The area has many public footpaths, including a section of the Severn Way. An illustrated map, detailing four circular walks, can be downloaded from the Red Lion Web Site. Further walks, rides, routes and information can be found on Arlingham Walks and Cycle Rides

Trains to Worcester, Cheltenham, Gloucester, Stroud, Swindon and London call at Stonehouse railway station and trains to Bristol, Bath and Westbury and Gloucester stop at Cam and Dursley railway station.

== Architecture ==
Arlingham is in a conservation area, and has a large number of historic buildings, many of them listed. The attractive, medieval Church of St Mary the Virgin displays good quality architectural work of the thirteenth, fourteenth and fifteenth centuries and is an example of the Decorated Gothic style of architecture. It is made of local blue lias stone. The tower was built of squared oolite Cotswold stone in 1372. 'Remarkably, evidence is provided by the contract for the building of the church tower. Such medieval contracts are rare and the Arlingham contract, which survived amongst the Berkeley archives, is especially valuable for the evidence it provides about the building process. The contract was drawn up in Latin and was made between the parishioners of whom nineteen are named, including John of Yate, William of Erlyngham, the Vicar whose name was Roger, ‘and all the parishioners of the church of Erlyngham’, on the one part, and the mason who undertook to build the tower on the other. The mason was Nicholas Wyshonger from Gloucester, so that the Arlingham tower was not built by any specialist team of travelling craftsmen but by a local builder. Some work had previously been done on the tower which was already several feet high, for Nicholas Wyshonger agreed to ‘build, construct and finish the belltower of the church of Erlyngham in the same manner as it had been started’. The work was to be finished within three years. The mason was to provide floors within the tower, held up by corbels and a spiral stairway with doors at the top and bottom. The tower was to have a fine window on the west side and four small windows, one on each side at the top stage where the bells would hang. These windows survive and the workmanship can still be admired after six centuries.' The Church still has some of the original stained glass windows dating from the mid-fourteenth century. These are some of the oldest stained glass windows in Gloucestershire. In the churchyard there are numerous finely carved headstones, with beautiful lettering.

== Governance ==
The village falls in the 'Severn' electoral ward. This ward starts in the north east at Moreton Valence then follows the M5 motorway south west to Slimbridge. The total ward population at the 2011 census was 4,760.

== History ==
Situated in the horseshoe loop of the Severn, Arlingham has much in its favour as a site for settlement, so it is quite possible that dwellings have existed on or near the present site for thousands of years, possibly as far back as the Stone Age, and evidence has been found in the area of Bronze Age and Iron Age settlers.

=== Roman era ===
Indications of a Roman settlement have been found to the north of Passage Road and Romano-British pottery has been found in the area, including along the river bank at Arlingham Warth, indicating that Arlingham was probably a wetland settlement of Roman Britain, possibly centred around iron workings. Numerous dense concentrations of primitive iron-making bloomery slag are distributed over the arable land south of Passage Pill. "It is very likely that Romano-British farmers organised the building of the first flood banks and drainage ditches or rhynes, to bring more of the marshland into cultivation."

In the 6th century the Western Roman Empire finally collapsed and Arlingham became a Saxon village or "ham". and part of the tribal kingdom of Hwicce. According to the Anglo-Saxon Chronicle, the kingdom was established in 577 after "Cuthwine and Ceawlin fought against the Britons and killed three Kings, Conmail, Condidan, and Farinmail at the battle at Dyrham; and they captured three of their cities, Gloucester, Cirencester and Bath". Hwicce included most of Gloucestershire, Worcestershire, Warwickshire, Bath north of the River Avon, plus small parts of Herefordshire, Shropshire, Staffordshire and north-west Wiltshire. After 628, the kingdom became a sub-kingdom of Mercia. Mercia dominated England south of the River Humber, as well as Hwicca, Mercia incorporated five of the other six kingdoms (East Anglia, Essex, Kent, Sussex and Wessex). Anglo-Saxon England remained a collection of tribal kingdoms until 927 when it was united as the Kingdom of England by King Æthelstan. 790 saw the first Viking raids and the period from this date until the Norman Conquest of England in 1066 is commonly known as the Viking Age. Historians believe that Vikings sailed up the River Severn and fought against the Anglo-Saxons and that in 894 AD King Alfred the Great fought the Vikings in a bloody battle at Minchinhampton, about 10 miles from Arlingham. Fighting could have ranged over a wide area of the Vale of Berkeley. In 2008, a wrought iron axe, believed to be Viking, was found in a field at Slimbridge.

=== Norman Conquest ===
After the Norman Conquest, William the Conqueror undertook a wholesale redistribution of land from the English to the Norman nobles. His "Great Survey", the Domesday Book completed at the end of 1086, records Arlingham as "Erlingeham" (meaning 'Homestead of the Eorlingas', the tribe of Eorla) as being "King's land and part of the Manor of Berkely, containing 1400 acres", making Arlingham an exclave of the Hundred of Berkeley.

=== Fishing ===
In the 12th century the Abbot of St. Augustine's Abbey Bristol (the Abbey later became Bristol Cathedral after the Dissolution of the Monasteries), had manorial land in Arlingham, which included fishing rights in the River Severn. Historic documents show that due to the abundance of fish in the River Severn, such as sturgeon, salmon, lamprey and alosinae or shad, fishing was a vital source of food, employment and trade from medieval times until the 19th century, when construction of navigation weirs, to assist the increasingly large vessels traverse of the River Severn, led to a rapid decline in the fish population. St Augustine's Manor House in Arlingham stood on the site of the present St. Augustine's farmhouse.

=== Church and other historic buildings ===
The earliest record of Arlingham church is in 1146, when the founder, Roger of Berkeley, a member of the Berkeley family and Baron of Dursley gave Arlingham church and its possessions to the Priory of St. Leonard Stanley (a Cell of St, Peter's, Gloucester Abbey, which in 1541 became Gloucester Cathedral). His daughter, Alice, married Maurice, son of Robert Fitzharding, who was given the manor of Berkeley by Henry II and became the 1st Lord of Berkeley. "In 1154 the manor of Arlingham was officially allotted to Robert Fitzharding and became known as Arlingham Court. A manor house was built on land opposite the Church, now known as The Grove or Court Sands". The early Berkeley deeds mention Hugh de Wike, in 1190, and his son Peter de Wika or de Wyke in 1220. in 1243 he was granted a lease of land in Berkeley and built the original Wick Court but sold it to the fourth Lord and Earl of Berkeley in the 14th century. "It was the Berkeley's who used their private standing army to strengthen and expand the new river flood banks to gain more land from the river". In 1327 John Berkeley's daughter Margaret, married John atte Yate of Arlingham and Arlingham Court passed into the Yate family. Between 1347 and 1351 was the time of the Black Death across Europe. Near Royal Orchard is a field formerly known as "The Pest Leaze" where, according to tradition, a large number of people were buried at the time of the plague. The Dursley Berkeley line ended in an heiress who married Thomas Wykes in the 15th century. The Manor House at Arlingham Court is believed to be substantially re-built in the mid 15th century. On 5 September 1538, following the split with Rome, Thomas Cromwell, minister to Henry VIII, issued an injunction requiring the details of baptisms, marriages and burials to be kept in a Parish register. In 1539 the oldest baptism was registered in Arlingham church. Following the Dissolution of the Monasteries, in 1542 the Abbey's manor and land in Arlingham were passed to the Dean and Chapter of the Bristol Cathedral, Around 1566 Slowwe Manor and estate was purchased by Thomas Hodges, acquiring manorial dues in the process, "Slo" or "Sloo" House as it was originally called, was originally the property of Thomas Pavy and had several owners before being purchased by Thomas Hodges, thence descended down to John Sayer, the latter states in his book Antiquities of Arlingham Parish. 2008. that he believes, therefore, that much of the house probably originates from the 15th century, though it was substantially rebuilt in the 18th century and further extended in the 19th century.

=== Flood ===
In the 17th century Arlingham experienced some severe flooding. 1607 saw The Great Flood of Arlingham. This was part of the Bristol Channel floods, 1607. Some scientists believe this may have been a storm surge, a combination of meteorological extremes and a high tide. However, Professor Simon Haslett of Bath Spa University and Australian geologist Ted Bryant of the University of Wollongong, published a research paper in 2002, in which they argue that there is evidence to suggest this may have been caused by a tsunami. As a result of this flooding, the current of the River Severn changed. The riverbanks were strengthened and the area now known as "The Warth" was enclosed and recovered from the river. Modern sources give the date of this flood as 1607, whereas older sources, give the date as 1606. This is due to the use of Old Style and New Style dates. Older sources use the Julian calendar, where the new year starts on Lady Day, 25 March, whereas more modern sources use the Gregorian calendar, with the new year starting January 1. In some sources both dates are given i.e. 1606/1607.

=== 17th and 18th centuries ===
In 1650; Wick Court was rebuilt in its present form. Also in the 17th century, the wrought iron turret clock, with its relatively rare single hand, was added to the Church, In 1717 six bells were cast by Abraham Rudhall and installed in the Church. In 1758, John Yate, the last male, Yate family heir died. His mother died in 1777 and the Court Estate passed to her great-niece Lady Dorothy Mill, who then sold Wick Court. On her death the Court Estate passed to her daughter Sophia Del Cannes, who lived in Naples and heavily mortgaged the estate which fell into a state of disrepair. In 1780 the large barn at Slowwepool farm was commissioned and built by the Hodges family. About 1781, "The Dutch Oak Pews were fitted in St Mary's church. They were originally high-backed panelled pews with doors, but these were cut down and made into open pews sometime in the last century. It is known that some of the old pews were fitted with iron hooks or stanchions to hold muskets – which is a throwback from when the old Court opposite the church was occupied by a garrison in the Civil War". Parliament passed the Inclosure (Consolidation) Act 1801 (41 Geo. 3. (U.K.) c. 109), which enabled any village, where three-quarters of the landowners agreed, to enclose its land. Arlingham took advantage of this and became tithe free as land was allotted to the vicar in lieu of tithes. In the last part of the 19th century the Holford family of Westonbirt House purchased the Court estate and in 1882 Arlingham Court, empty for many years and in ruins, was demolished. In 1856 Slowwe House descended down through the Hodges family to the Reverend John Sayer, Vicar of Arlingham when he married Elizabeth Hodges, and subsequently to their son, also John Sayer. When the latter died in 1886, Slowwe House passed into the ownership of Mr Carter

=== 19th century ===
The passing of the Census Act 1800 enabled the first Census of England, Scotland and Wales to be undertaken. The census was carried out in 1801 and every ten years thereafter. Little remains of the 1801 - 1821 censuses but, fortunately, much of the census information for Arlingham in 1831 has survived and shows the Arlingham population as 744, 393 male and 351 female, with 143 families, living in 103 houses. 85 families were mainly employed in Agriculture, 28 trade, manufacture and handicrafts and 30 families classified as "other". 5 houses in the village are shown as uninhabitable and one house was being built. Further analysis of the 1831 census shows that 66% of the working male population over 20 were labourers or servants, 16% were "middling sorts", defined as "small farmers, masters and skilled workers with no employees", 13% were employers, mostly large farmers, and 8% were "others". Information from the 1841 - 1911 censuses is accessible (census data is only publicly available after 100 years) and has been transcribed in a form that can be freely searched on line, though some of the information from the older censuses is barely legible and in the transcription process many errors occurred. Photocopies of Arlingham Parish Registers are also available. The 1871 census shows Arlingham as having a population of 697. At that time the village had a shop, blacksmith, butcher, tailor, dressmaker, shoemaker, school mistress, engine fitter, barge owner, two public houses (The Red Lion and The New Inn), as well mariners, watermen, bricklayers, masons, carpenters, 12 farmers. and many farm and domestic workers. Until 1934 Arlingham was in the "Wheatenhurst" (otherwise known as Whitminster) registration district, after which it became part of the Gloucester Rural District. In Kelly's Directory of Gloucestershire (1897), the listing for Arlingham states "George Lindsay Holford C.I.E. of Weston Birt House, is Lord of the manor and chief landowner".

=== Historic transport links ===
Arlingham is on the course of a Roman road, the Margary 543 which is said to extend from a river crossing of the Severn at Arlingham through Frampton on Severn, Eastington, Frocester and Kingscote to join the Fosse Way It is believed that the remains of this can be found in Silver Street and that the straightness of Passage Road was due not to Roman ancestry but to the former existence of flanking rope walk. The Roman road led to the old Ford, which crossed the Severn to Newnham. The position of this ford can still be seen at low tide, when the water ripples over the shallow bed of rock, a few hundred yards from Newnham, just below Broadoak. This ford was still passable until around 1802, when the river changed channel, shifted and took away the sand bank that gave access to the fordable, though dangerous, rocky causeway. "The last recorded party to use this ford was led by John Smith of Littledean, when he took over the tenancy of Overton Farm, Arlingham and drove his entire stock of cattle, sheep, wagons, goods and family, without loss over Newnam Passage. His descendants still farm at Arlingham today". The first ferry from Arlingham to Newnham was recorded in 1238 and the British Universal Trade Directory of 1792 noted that Newnham provided "a very safe ferry over the Severn". Horses and coaches were carried in the 18th century and animals were carried in an ox or cattle boat and crossed the river to the railway station in Newham from when it opened in 1852 until 1914; the Ferry was also very important to the people of Arlingham because they could cross the river to trade, catch a train to South Wales or Gloucester or travel onwards. Bakers in Newnham crossed the river daily to trade, bringing back cream and farm produce. The ferry continued in use until after the Second World War but gradually use of the ferry decreased and lack of maintenance of landing stages on either side meant traversing mud - one of the duties of the ferryman had become carrying people across the mud. In 1913 Arthur Cooke wrote in The Forest of Dean "At low tide a small portion only of the journey will be made by boat - the remaining area of tenacious mud-flats stretching from the farther shore must needs be traversed in The Ferryman's strong arms'. In the year 2000 Arlingham and Newnham on Severn celebrated the millennium by once again opening the ferry to link the two communities. The Assault Squadron Royal Marines 539 kindly provided two hovercraft. Three thousand people were ferried across to enjoy festivities in Arlingham and Newnham on 10 and 11 June 2000.

=== Travel on the Severn ===
As Britain's longest navigable river, the Severn could once be sailed for 160 miles from the sea to near Welshpool in Wales. Up until the 19th century the River Severn was a vital commercial thoroughfare providing a transport system for food, minerals, timber and other cash crops produced in the region to reach their markets in the outside world. Flat bottomed sailing barges known as Severn trows used to navigate the river as far as Gloucester but they could only do that on the high spring tides. According to Brian Waters in his book "The Severn Tide" "The barges often had to wait high and dry on the Arlingham shore for high water. The bargees came ashore and got drunk. In this state of maudlin inebriety, with money spent and thoughts of hungry families at home, they robbed Arlingham's fields and gardens of fruit and vegetables". The Gloucester and Sharpness Canal was conceived in 1798 and completed in 1827, to make Gloucester accessible at all times and England's most inland port.

=== Severn Tunnel ===
The Severn Tunnel Company secured an act of Parliament, the Severn Tunnel Act 1810 (50 Geo. 3. c. cxxiv), to build a tunnel under the river at Arlingham Passage. The Severn tunnel (1810) plan was for a tramroad tunnel beneath the River Severn. The tunnel was to cross the river at Arlingham Passage, at a location between Newnham on Severn and Bullo Pill on the west bank, to the promontory near Arlingham on the east. Work was started but problems with flooding meant the project had to be abandoned. There were various schemes for a bridge, most recently in 1950, but environmental and financial constraints meant none of these came to fruition.

=== Local authors ===
During the first decade of the 21st century, a group of villagers published three books of village life from bygone years to the present day.

- Arlingham, a Snapshot in Time. 2001.
- Antiquities of Arlingham Parish. 2008.
- Where the River Bends. 2009.

=== Minesweeper ===
A previous Ham class minesweeper was named after the village - HMS Arlingham.
