= Trow =

Type of British river cargo boat

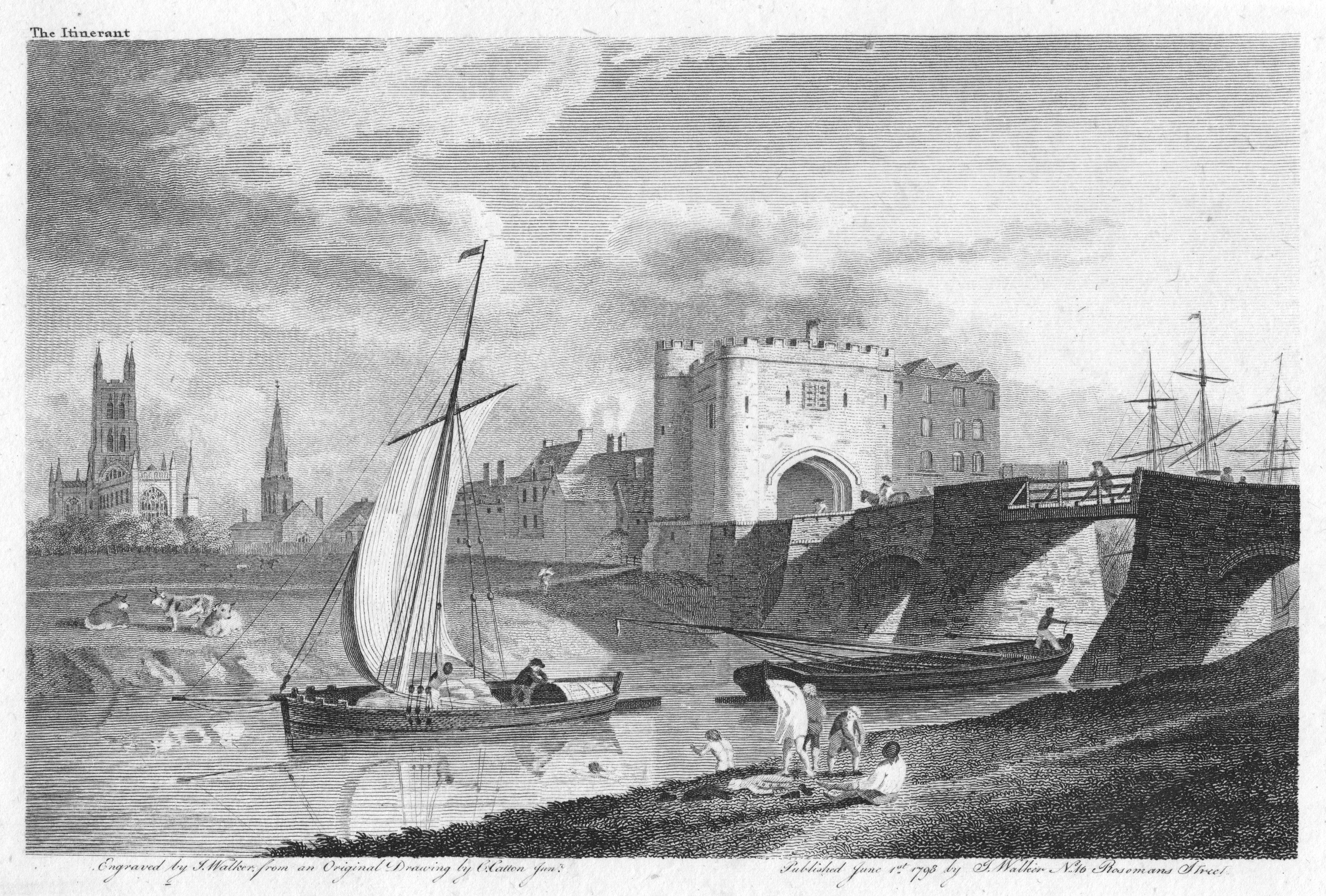
Trows navigating a bridge over the Severn at Gloucester, showing the collapsible mast feature

A trow was a type of cargo boat found in the past on the rivers Severn and Wye in Great Britain and used to transport goods.

== Features ==
The mast could be taken down so that the trow could go under bridges, such as the bridge at Worcester and the many bridges up and downstream. The mast was stepped in a three sided frame open at the rear but closed with an iron pin or rope lashing. From the top of the mast a forestay ran down to the bow winch. To lower the mast the pin was removed and the winch slackened off to let the mast fall towards the stern. The reverse operation pulled the mast up.

Despite their flat-bottomed hull form which made volume available for their load and permitted drying out on muddy banks in the tidal area where they operated, Trows were seaworthy. For example, with an added keel the Droitwich Trow Hastings is recorded as taking 90 tons of salt from Droitwich to France across the English Channel. The flat-bottomed trows sailed on the sea by hauling a 20-foot (6.1 m) log of wood under the hull strapped with chains to act as a temporary keel, to limit leeway (the hull sliding sideways under lateral sail pressure on their fore-and-aft rig).

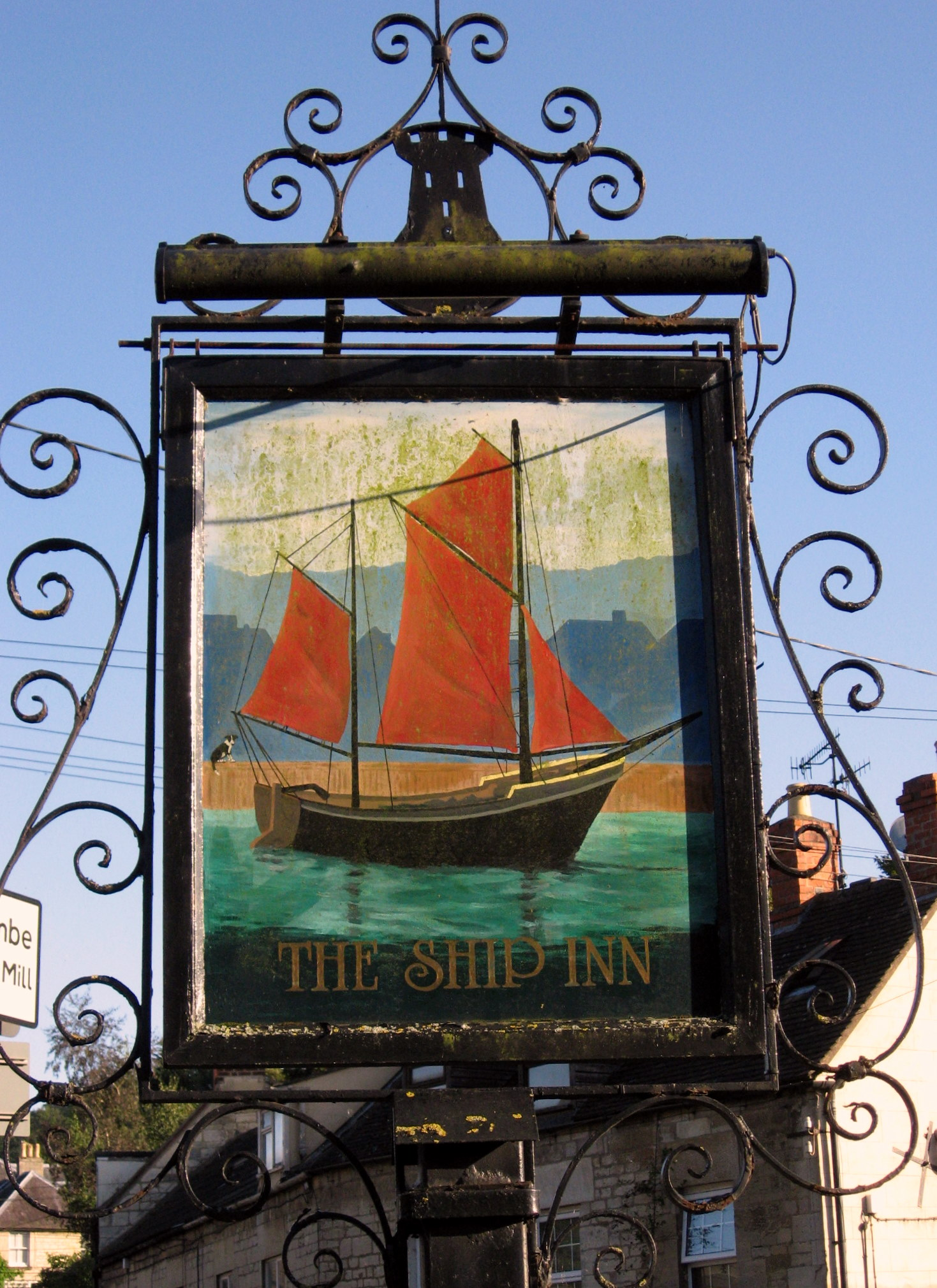
The Ship Inn sign at Brimscombe featuring a Severn Trow

== Types ==
There are two traditional types of Severn Trow. Prior to the 1840s the River Severn was tidal up to Worcester. The trows that were used on the tidal portion of the River were called Downstream Trows whilst those that sailed north of Worcester were called Upstream Trows and were smaller. During the summer the flow of water was often very low and so the trows were pulled over the resultant shallows. A rope was attached to the mast and the men who pulled the boats were called bow hauliers. The men would enter into a contract with the captain of the trow in the many pubs along the Severn riverbanks, and there was a right of way along the bankside. A document originally published in 1940 about such vessels states that the term trow is "believed to have been derived from the same root as the word 'trough'".

A Trow called Joan was owned by a timber merchant called Oliver Luff. He used her to bring timber from Tintern, Monmouthshire into 'The Back' now called 'Welsh Back' in Bristol's Floating Harbour, where he owned two timber yards. A pub, the Llandoger Trow is situated in Bristol.

A replica Wye trow, named Hereford Bull, was constructed in 2012 to participate in the Thames Diamond Jubilee Pageant.

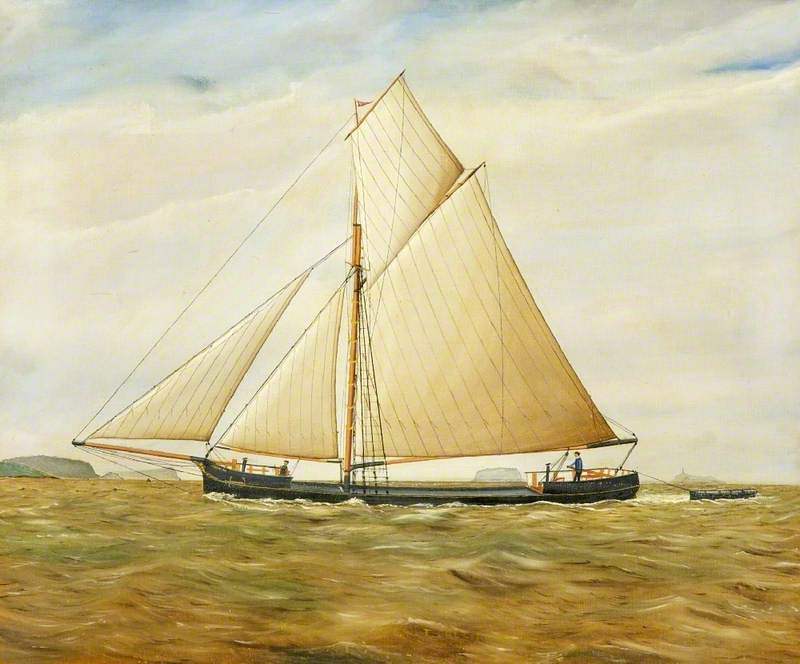
The Severn Trow Spry; 1908 painting

The last complete Severn trow still in existence, the Downstream Trow Spry, went into operation on 25 October 1894 and worked in the Bristol Channel, primarily moving limestone from quarries in the Chepstow area to the Cardiff, Wales area in her early years. A reliable source states that "she was originally sloop rigged, with a jib, staysail, topsail and gaff main," as well as a mast believed to have been fixed. Her condition deteriorated over the years, becoming derelict. The Spry was rebuilt with many new components; the effort began in 1983 and was not fully completed until 1992. She is currently on display at the Blists Hill site of the Ironbridge Gorge Museums in a dry location (not on water).

A smaller (18 feet (5.5 m) max) boat called a 'Trow' is peculiar to the Fleet lagoon in Dorset. It is used primarily for the transport of mackerel caught by seine net fishing crews off Chesil Beach. Once caught they are boxed and transported across to the mainland by these flat-bottomed boats. Unlike the River Severn version the Fleet variant is only ever towed, rowed or punted and has no mast or sail.

== Pronunciation ==
Trow may be pronounced as trō (rhyming with "crow") or as trou (rhyming with "cow"). The former pronunciation was the usual one throughout Worcestershire, Shropshire and Dorset. While the latter exists regionally, dictionaries often give only the former pronunciation.

== See also ==
- Canals of the United Kingdom
- History of the British canal system
