= List of peers 1780–1789 =

This page lists all peers who held extant titles between 1780 and 1789.

== Peerage of England, Scotland and Great Britain ==
=== Dukes ===
Title	Holder	Date gained	Date lost	Notes
Peerage of England
Duke of Cornwall (1337)	George, Prince of Wales	1762	1820	
Duke of Norfolk (1483)	Charles Howard, 10th Duke of Norfolk	1777	1786	Died
Duke of Norfolk (1483)	Charles Howard, 11th Duke of Norfolk	1786	1815	
Duke of Somerset (1547)	Edward Seymour, 9th Duke of Somerset	1757	1792	
Duke of Richmond (1675)	Charles Lennox, 3rd Duke of Richmond	1750	1806	
Duke of Grafton (1675)	Augustus FitzRoy, 3rd Duke of Grafton	1757	1811	
Duke of Beaufort (1682)	Henry Somerset, 5th Duke of Beaufort	1756	1803	
Duke of St Albans (1684)	George Beauclerk, 3rd Duke of St Albans	1751	1786	Died
Duke of St Albans (1684)	George Beauclerk, 4th Duke of St Albans	1786	1787	
Duke of St Albans (1684)	Aubrey Beauclerk, 5th Duke of St Albans	1786	1802	
Duke of Bolton (1689)	Harry Powlett, 6th Duke of Bolton	1765	1794	
Duke of Leeds (1694)	Thomas Osborne, 4th Duke of Leeds	1731	1789	Died
Duke of Leeds (1694)	Francis Osborne, 5th Duke of Leeds	1789	1799	
Duke of Bedford (1694)	Francis Russell, 5th Duke of Bedford	1771	1802	
Duke of Devonshire (1694)	William Cavendish, 5th Duke of Devonshire	1764	1811	
Duke of Marlborough (1702)	George Spencer, 4th Duke of Marlborough	1758	1817	
Duke of Rutland (1703)	Charles Manners, 4th Duke of Rutland	1779	1787	Died
Duke of Rutland (1703)	John Manners, 5th Duke of Rutland	1787	1857	
Peerage of Scotland
Duke of Hamilton (1643)	Douglas Hamilton, 8th Duke of Hamilton	1769	1799	
Duke of Buccleuch (1663)	Henry Scott, 3rd Duke of Buccleuch	1751	1812	
Duke of Queensberry (1684)	William Douglas, 4th Duke of Queensberry	1778	1810	
Duke of Gordon (1684)	Alexander Gordon, 4th Duke of Gordon	1752	1827	
Duke of Argyll (1701)	John Campbell, 5th Duke of Argyll	1770	1806	
Duke of Atholl (1703)	John Murray, 4th Duke of Atholl	1774	1830	
Duke of Montrose (1707)	William Graham, 2nd Duke of Montrose	1742	1790	
Duke of Roxburghe (1707)	John Ker, 3rd Duke of Roxburghe	1755	1804	
Peerage of Great Britain
Duke of Ancaster and Kesteven (1715)	Brownlow Bertie, 5th Duke of Ancaster and Kesteven	1779	1809	
Duke of Portland (1716)	William Cavendish-Bentinck, 3rd Duke of Portland	1762	1809	
Duke of Manchester (1719)	George Montagu, 4th Duke of Manchester	1762	1788	Died
Duke of Manchester (1719)	William Montagu, 5th Duke of Manchester	1788	1843	
Duke of Chandos (1719)	James Brydges, 3rd Duke of Chandos	1771	1789	Died, title extinct
Duke of Dorset (1720)	John Sackville, 3rd Duke of Dorset	1769	1799	
Duke of Bridgewater (1720)	Francis Egerton, 3rd Duke of Bridgewater	1748	1803	
Duke of Newcastle (1756)	Henry Pelham-Clinton, 2nd Duke of Newcastle	1768	1794	
Duke of Gloucester and Edinburgh (1764)	Prince William Henry, Duke of Gloucester and Edinburgh	1764	1805	
Duke of Northumberland (1766)	Hugh Percy, 1st Duke of Northumberland	1766	1786	Died
Duke of Northumberland (1766)	Hugh Percy, 2nd Duke of Northumberland	1786	1819	
Duke of Cumberland and Strathearn (1766)	Prince Henry, Duke of Cumberland and Strathearn	1766	1790	
Duke of Montagu (1766)	George Montagu, 1st Duke of Montagu	1766	1790	
Duke of York and Albany (1784)	Prince Frederick, Duke of York and Albany	1784	1827	New creation
Duke of Clarence and St Andrews (1789)	Prince William, 1st Duke of Clarence and St Andrews	1789	1830	New creation

=== Marquesses ===
Title	Holder	Date gained	Date lost	Notes
Peerage of England
-
Peerage of Scotland
Marquess of Tweeddale (1694)	George Hay, 6th Marquess of Tweeddale	1770	1787	Died
Marquess of Tweeddale (1694)	George Hay, 7th Marquess of Tweeddale	1787	1804	
Marquess of Lothian (1701)	William Kerr, 5th Marquess of Lothian	1775	1815	
Marquess of Annandale (1701)	George Vanden-Bempde, 3rd Marquess of Annandale	1730	1792	
Peerage of Great Britain
Marquess Grey (1740)	Jemima Yorke, 2nd Marchioness Grey	1740	1797	
Marquess of Rockingham (1746)	Charles Watson-Wentworth, 2nd Marquess of Rockingham	1750	1782	Died, title extinct
Marquess of Buckingham (1784)	George Nugent-Temple-Grenville, 1st Marquess of Buckingham	1784	1813	New creation
Marquess of Lansdowne (1784)	William Petty Fitzmaurice, 1st Marquess of Lansdowne	1784	1805	New creation
Marquess of Stafford (1786)	Granville Leveson-Gower, 1st Marquess of Stafford	1786	1803	New creation
Marquess Townshend (1787)	George Townshend, 1st Marquess Townshend	1787	1807	New creation
Marquess of Salisbury (1789)	James Cecil, 1st Marquess of Salisbury	1789	1823	New creation
Marquess of Bath (1789)	Thomas Thynne, 1st Marquess of Bath	1789	1796	New creation

=== Earls ===
Title	Holder	Date gained	Date lost	Notes
Peerage of England
Earl of Shrewsbury (1442)	George Talbot, 14th Earl of Shrewsbury	1743	1787	Died
Earl of Shrewsbury (1442)	Charles Talbot, 15th Earl of Shrewsbury	1787	1827	
Earl of Derby (1485)	Edward Smith-Stanley, 12th Earl of Derby	1776	1834	
Earl of Huntingdon (1529)	Francis Hastings, 10th Earl of Huntingdon	1746	1789	Died
Earl of Huntingdon (1529)	Theophilus Henry Hastings, ''de jure'' 11th Earl of Huntingdon	1789	1804	
Earl of Pembroke (1551)	Henry Herbert, 10th Earl of Pembroke	1749	1794	
Earl of Devon (1553)	William Courtenay, de jure 8th Earl of Devon	1762	1788	Died
Earl of Devon (1553)	William Courtenay, de jure 9th Earl of Devon	1788	1831	
Earl of Suffolk (1603)	Thomas Howard, 14th Earl of Suffolk	1779	1783	Died
Earl of Suffolk (1603)	John Howard, 15th Earl of Suffolk	1783	1830	
Earl of Exeter (1605)	Brownlow Cecil, 9th Earl of Exeter	1754	1793	
Earl of Salisbury (1605)	James Cecil, 6th Earl of Salisbury	1728	1780	Died
Earl of Salisbury (1605)	James Cecil, 7th Earl of Salisbury	1782	1823	Created Marquess of Salisbury, see above
Earl of Northampton (1618)	Spencer Compton, 8th Earl of Northampton	1763	1796	
Earl of Denbigh (1622)	Basil Feilding, 6th Earl of Denbigh	1755	1800	
Earl of Westmorland (1624)	John Fane, 10th Earl of Westmorland	1774	1841	
Earl of Peterborough (1628)	Charles Henry Mordaunt, 5th Earl of Peterborough	1779	1814	
Earl of Stamford (1628)	George Grey, 5th Earl of Stamford	1768	1819	
Earl of Winchilsea (1628)	George Finch, 9th Earl of Winchilsea	1769	1826	
Earl of Chesterfield (1628)	Philip Stanhope, 5th Earl of Chesterfield	1773	1815	
Earl of Thanet (1628)	Sackville Tufton, 8th Earl of Thanet	1753	1786	Died
Earl of Thanet (1628)	Sackville Tufton, 9th Earl of Thanet	1786	1825	
Earl of Sandwich (1660)	John Montagu, 4th Earl of Sandwich	1729	1792	
Earl of Essex (1661)	William Capell, 4th Earl of Essex	1743	1799	
Earl of Carlisle (1661)	Frederick Howard, 5th Earl of Carlisle	1758	1825	
Earl of Shaftesbury (1672)	Anthony Ashley-Cooper, 5th Earl of Shaftesbury	1771	1811	
Earl of Berkeley (1679)	Frederick Augustus Berkeley, 5th Earl of Berkeley	1755	1810	
Earl of Abingdon (1682)	Willoughby Bertie, 4th Earl of Abingdon	1760	1799	
Earl of Gainsborough (1682)	Henry Noel, 6th Earl of Gainsborough	1759	1799	
Earl of Plymouth (1682)	Other Windsor, 5th Earl of Plymouth	1771	1799	
Earl of Scarbrough (1690)	Richard Lumley-Saunderson, 4th Earl of Scarbrough	1752	1782	Died
Earl of Scarbrough (1690)	George Lumley-Saunderson, 5th Earl of Scarbrough	1782	1807	
Earl of Rochford (1695)	William Nassau de Zuylestein, 4th Earl of Rochford	1738	1781	Died
Earl of Rochford (1695)	William Nassau de Zuylestein, 5th Earl of Rochford	1781	1830	
Earl of Albemarle (1697)	William Keppel, 4th Earl of Albemarle	1772	1849	
Earl of Coventry (1697)	George Coventry, 6th Earl of Coventry	1751	1809	
Earl of Jersey (1697)	George Villiers, 4th Earl of Jersey	1769	1805	
Earl Poulett (1706)	Vere Poulett, 3rd Earl Poulett	1764	1788	Died
Earl Poulett (1706)	John Poulett, 4th Earl Poulett	1788	1819	
Earl of Cholmondeley (1706)	George James Cholmondeley, 4th Earl of Cholmondeley	1770	1827	
Peerage of Scotland
Earl of Crawford (1398)	George Lindsay-Crawford, 21st Earl of Crawford	1749	1781	Died
Earl of Crawford (1398)	George Lindsay-Crawford, 22nd Earl of Crawford	1781	1808	
Earl of Erroll (1452)	George Hay, 16th Earl of Erroll	1778	1798	
Earl of Sutherland (1235)	Elizabeth Gordon, 19th Countess of Sutherland	1766	1839	
Earl of Rothes (1458)	Jane Elizabeth Leslie, 12th Countess of Rothes	1773	1810	
Earl of Morton (1458)	George Douglas, 16th Earl of Morton	1774	1827	
Earl of Glencairn (1488)	James Cunningham, 14th Earl of Glencairn	1775	1791	
Earl of Eglinton (1507)	Archibald Montgomerie, 11th Earl of Eglinton	1769	1796	
Earl of Cassilis (1509)	David Kennedy, 10th Earl of Cassilis	1775	1792	
Earl of Caithness (1455)	John Sinclair, 11th Earl of Caithness	1779	1789	Died
Earl of Caithness (1455)	James Sinclair, 12th Earl of Caithness	1789	1823	
Earl of Buchan (1469)	David Erskine, 11th Earl of Buchan	1767	1829	
Earl of Moray (1562)	Francis Stuart, 9th Earl of Moray	1767	1810	
Earl of Home (1605)	Alexander Home, 9th Earl of Home	1761	1786	Died
Earl of Home (1605)	Alexander Home, 10th Earl of Home	1786	1841	
Earl of Abercorn (1606)	James Hamilton, 8th Earl of Abercorn	1744	1789	Died
Earl of Abercorn (1606)	John Hamilton, 9th Earl of Abercorn	1789	1818	
Earl of Strathmore and Kinghorne (1606)	John Bowes, 10th Earl of Strathmore and Kinghorne	1776	1820	
Earl of Kellie (1619)	Thomas Erskine, 6th Earl of Kellie	1758	1781	Died
Earl of Kellie (1619)	Archibald Erskine, 7th Earl of Kellie	1781	1795	
Earl of Haddington (1619)	Thomas Hamilton, 7th Earl of Haddington	1735	1794	
Earl of Galloway (1623)	John Stewart, 7th Earl of Galloway	1773	1806	
Earl of Lauderdale (1624)	James Maitland, 7th Earl of Lauderdale	1744	1789	Died
Earl of Lauderdale (1624)	James Maitland, 8th Earl of Lauderdale	1789	1839	
Earl of Loudoun (1633)	John Campbell, 4th Earl of Loudoun	1731	1782	Died
Earl of Loudoun (1633)	James Mure-Campbell, 5th Earl of Loudoun	1782	1786	
Earl of Loudoun (1633)	Flora Campbell, 6th Countess of Loudoun	1786	1840	
Earl of Kinnoull (1633)	Thomas Hay, 9th Earl of Kinnoull	1758	1787	Died
Earl of Kinnoull (1633)	Robert Hay-Drummond, 10th Earl of Kinnoull	1787	1804	
Earl of Dumfries (1633)	Patrick McDouall-Crichton, 6th Earl of Dumfries	1769	1803	
Earl of Elgin (1633)	Thomas Bruce, 7th Earl of Elgin	1771	1841	
Earl of Traquair (1633)	Charles Stewart, 7th Earl of Traquair	1779	1827	
Earl of Dalhousie (1633)	George Ramsay, 8th Earl of Dalhousie	1764	1787	Died
Earl of Dalhousie (1633)	George Ramsay, 9th Earl of Dalhousie	1787	1838	
Earl of Findlater (1638)	James Ogilvy, 7th Earl of Findlater	1770	1811	
Earl of Leven (1641)	David Leslie, 6th Earl of Leven	1754	1802	
Earl of Dysart (1643)	Lionel Tollemache, 5th Earl of Dysart	1770	1799	
Earl of Selkirk (1646)	Dunbar Douglas, 4th Earl of Selkirk	1744	1799	
Earl of Northesk (1647)	George Carnegie, 6th Earl of Northesk	1741	1792	
Earl of Balcarres (1651)	Alexander Lindsay, 6th Earl of Balcarres	1768	1825	
Earl of Aboyne (1660)	Charles Gordon, 4th Earl of Aboyne	1732	1794	
Earl of Newburgh (1660)	James Radclyffe, 4th Earl of Newburgh	1755	1786	Died
Earl of Newburgh (1660)	Anthony Radclyffe, 5th Earl of Newburgh	1786	1814	
Earl of Dundonald (1669)	Archibald Cochrane, 9th Earl of Dundonald	1778	1831	
Earl of Kintore (1677)	Anthony Keith-Falconer, 5th Earl of Kintore	1778	1804	
Earl of Breadalbane and Holland (1677)	John Campbell, 3rd Earl of Breadalbane and Holland	1752	1782	Died
Earl of Breadalbane and Holland (1677)	John Campbell, 4th Earl of Breadalbane and Holland	1782	1834	
Earl of Aberdeen (1682)	George Gordon, 3rd Earl of Aberdeen	1746	1801	
Earl of Dunmore (1686)	John Murray, 4th Earl of Dunmore	1752	1809	
Earl of Orkney (1696)	Mary O'Brien, 3rd Countess of Orkney	1756	1790	
Earl of Marchmont (1697)	Hugh Hume-Campbell, 3rd Earl of Marchmont	1740	1794	
Earl of Hyndford (1701)	John Carmichael, 4th Earl of Hyndford	1766	1787	Died
Earl of Hyndford (1701)	Thomas Carmichael, 5th Earl of Hyndford	1787	1811	
Earl of Stair (1703)	John Dalrymple, 5th Earl of Stair	1768	1789	Died
Earl of Stair (1703)	John Dalrymple, 6th Earl of Stair	1789	1821	
Earl of Rosebery (1703)	Neil Primrose, 3rd Earl of Rosebery	1765	1814	
Earl of Glasgow (1703)	George Boyle, 4th Earl of Glasgow	1775	1843	
Earl of Portmore (1703)	Charles Colyear, 2nd Earl of Portmore	1730	1785	Died
Earl of Portmore (1703)	William Colyear, 3rd Earl of Portmore	1785	1823	
Earl of Bute (1703)	John Stuart, 3rd Earl of Bute	1723	1792	
Earl of Hopetoun (1703)	John Hope, 2nd Earl of Hopetoun	1742	1781	Died
Earl of Hopetoun (1703)	James Hope-Johnstone, 3rd Earl of Hopetoun	781	1816	
Earl of Deloraine (1706)	Henry Scott, 4th Earl of Deloraine	1740	1807	
Peerage of Great Britain
Earl of Oxford and Mortimer (1711)	Edward Harley, 4th Earl of Oxford and Earl Mortimer	1755	1790	
Earl of Strafford (1711)	William Wentworth, 2nd Earl of Strafford	1739	1791	
Earl Ferrers (1711)	Robert Shirley, 6th Earl Ferrers	1778	1787	Died
Earl Ferrers (1711)	Robert Shirley, 7th Earl Ferrers	1787	1827	
Earl of Dartmouth (1711)	William Legge, 2nd Earl of Dartmouth	1750	1801	
Earl of Tankerville (1714)	Charles Bennet, 4th Earl of Tankerville	1767	1822	
Earl of Aylesford (1714)	Heneage Finch, 4th Earl of Aylesford	1777	1812	
Earl of Bristol (1714)	Frederick Hervey, 4th Earl of Bristol	1779	1803	
Earl of Sussex (1717)	Henry Yelverton, 3rd Earl of Sussex	1758	1799	
Earl Cowper (1718)	George Clavering-Cowper, 3rd Earl Cowper	1764	1789	Died
Earl Cowper (1718)	George Clavering-Cowper, 4th Earl Cowper	1789	1799	
Earl Stanhope (1718)	Philip Stanhope, 2nd Earl Stanhope	1721	1786	Died
Earl Stanhope (1718)	Charles Stanhope, 3rd Earl Stanhope	1786	1816	
Earl of Harborough (1719)	Robert Sherard, 4th Earl of Harborough	1770	1799	
Earl of Macclesfield (1721)	Thomas Parker, 3rd Earl of Macclesfield	1764	1795	
Earl of Pomfret (1721)	George Fermor, 2nd Earl of Pomfret	1753	1785	Died
Earl of Pomfret (1721)	George Fermor, 3rd Earl of Pomfret	1785	1830	
Earl Waldegrave (1729)	John Waldegrave, 3rd Earl Waldegrave	1763	1784	Died
Earl Waldegrave (1729)	George Waldegrave, 4th Earl Waldegrave	1784	1789	Died
Earl Waldegrave (1729)	George Waldegrave, 5th Earl Waldegrave	1789	1794	
Earl of Ashburnham (1730)	John Ashburnham, 2nd Earl of Ashburnham	1737	1812	
Earl of Effingham (1731)	Thomas Howard, 3rd Earl of Effingham	1763	1791	
Earl of Orford (1742)	George Walpole, 3rd Earl of Orford	1751	1791	
Earl of Harrington (1742)	Charles Stanhope, 3rd Earl of Harrington	1779	1829	
Earl of Portsmouth (1743)	John Wallop, 2nd Earl of Portsmouth	1762	1797	
Earl Brooke (1746)	George Greville, 2nd Earl Brooke	1773	1816	
Earl Gower (1746)	Granville Leveson-Gower, 2nd Earl Gower	1754	1803	Created Marquess of Stafford, see above
Earl of Buckinghamshire (1746)	John Hobart, 2nd Earl of Buckinghamshire	1756	1793	
Earl Fitzwilliam (1746)	William Fitzwilliam, 2nd Earl Fitzwilliam	1756	1833	
Earl of Powis (1748)	George Herbert, 2nd Earl of Powis	1772	1801	
Earl of Egremont (1748)	George Wyndham, 3rd Earl of Egremont	1763	1837	
Earl Temple (1749)	George Nugent-Temple-Grenville, 3rd Earl Temple	1779	1813	Created Marquess of Buckingham, see above
Earl Harcourt (1749)	George Harcourt, 2nd Earl Harcourt	1777	1809	
Earl of Hertford (1750)	Francis Seymour-Conway, 1st Earl of Hertford	1750	1794	
Earl of Guilford (1752)	Francis North, 1st Earl of Guilford	1752	1790	
Earl Cornwallis (1753)	Charles Cornwallis, 2nd Earl Cornwallis	1762	1805	
Earl of Hardwicke (1754)	Philip Yorke, 2nd Earl of Hardwicke	1764	1790	
Earl of Darlington (1754)	Henry Vane, 2nd Earl of Darlington	1758	1792	
Earl Fauconberg (1756)	Henry Belasyse, 2nd Earl Fauconberg	1774	1802	
Earl of Ilchester (1756)	Henry Fox-Strangways, 2nd Earl of Ilchester	1776	1802	
Earl De La Warr (1761)	William West, 3rd Earl De La Warr	1777	1783	Died
Earl De La Warr (1761)	John West, 4th Earl De La Warr	1783	1795	
Earl Talbot (1761)	William Talbot, 1st Earl Talbot	1761	1782	Died; Peerage extinct
Earl of Northington (1764)	Robert Henley, 2nd Earl of Northington	1772	1786	Died; Peerage extinct
Earl of Radnor (1765)	Jacob Pleydell-Bouverie, 2nd Earl of Radnor	1776	1828	
Earl Spencer (1765)	John Spencer, 1st Earl Spencer	1765	1783	Died
Earl Spencer (1765)	George Spencer, 2nd Earl Spencer	1783	1834	
Earl of Chatham (1766)	John Pitt, 2nd Earl of Chatham	1778	1835	
Earl Bathurst (1772)	Henry Bathurst, 2nd Earl Bathurst	1775	1794	
Earl of Hillsborough (1772)	Wills Hill, 1st Earl of Hillsborough	1772	1793	Created Marquess of Downshire, see above
Earl of Ailesbury (1776)	Thomas Brudenell-Bruce, 1st Earl of Ailesbury	1776	1814	
Earl of Clarendon (1776)	Thomas Villiers, 1st Earl of Clarendon	1776	1786	Died
Earl of Clarendon (1776)	Thomas Villiers, 2nd Earl of Clarendon	1786	1824	
Earl of Mansfield (1776)	William Murray, 1st Earl of Mansfield	1776	1793	
Earl of Abergavenny (1784)	George Nevill, 1st Earl of Abergavenny	1784	1785	New creation; died
Earl of Abergavenny (1784)	Henry Nevill, 2nd Earl of Abergavenny	1785	1843	
Earl of Leicester (1784)	George Townshend, 1st Earl of Leicester	1784	1811	New creation
Earl of Lonsdale (1784)	James Lowther, 1st Earl of Lonsdale	1784	1802	New creation
Earl of Uxbridge (1784)	Henry Paget, 1st Earl of Uxbridge	1784	1812	New creation
Earl Talbot (1784)	John Chetwynd-Talbot, 1st Earl Talbot	1784	1793	New creation
Earl Grosvenor (1784)	Richard Grosvenor, 1st Earl Grosvenor	1784	1802	New creation
Earl Beaulieu (1784)	Edward Hussey-Montagu, 1st Earl Beaulieu	1784	1802	New creation
Earl Camden (1786)	Charles Pratt, 1st Earl Camden	1786	1794	New creation
Earl Howe (1788)	Richard Howe, 1st Earl Howe	1788	1799	New creation
Earl of Mount Edgcumbe (1789)	George Edgcumbe, 1st Earl of Mount Edgcumbe	1789	1795	New creation
Earl Fortescue (1789)	Hugh Fortescue, 1st Earl Fortescue	1789	1841	New creation

=== Viscounts ===
Title	Holder	Date gained	Date lost	Notes
Peerage of England
Viscount Hereford (1550)	Edward Devereux, 12th Viscount Hereford	1760	1783	Died
Viscount Hereford (1550)	George Devereux, 13th Viscount Hereford	1783	1804	
Viscount Montagu (1554)	Anthony Browne, 7th Viscount Montagu	1767	1787	Died
Viscount Montagu (1554)	George Browne, 8th Viscount Montagu	1787	1793	
Viscount Saye and Sele (1624)	Richard Fiennes, 6th Viscount Saye and Sele	1742	1781	Died, title extinct
Viscount Townshend (1682)	George Townshend, 4th Viscount Townshend	1764	1807	Created Marquess Townshend, see above
Viscount Weymouth (1682)	Thomas Thynne, 3rd Viscount Weymouth	1751	1796	Created Marquess of Bath, see above
Peerage of Scotland
Viscount of Falkland (1620)	Lucius Cary, 7th Viscount Falkland	1730	1785	Died
Viscount of Falkland (1620)	Henry Thomas Cary, 8th Viscount Falkland	1785	1796	
Viscount of Stormont (1621)	David Murray, 7th Viscount of Stormont	1748	1796	
Viscount of Arbuthnott (1641)	John Arbuthnot, 6th Viscount of Arbuthnott	1756	1791	
Peerage of Great Britain
Viscount Bolingbroke (1712)	Frederick St John, 2nd Viscount Bolingbroke	1751	1787	Died
Viscount Bolingbroke (1712)	George St John, 3rd Viscount Bolingbroke	1787	1824	
Viscount Falmouth (1720)	Hugh Boscawen, 2nd Viscount Falmouth	1734	1782	Died
Viscount Falmouth (1720)	George Boscawen, 3rd Viscount Falmouth	1782	1808	
Viscount Torrington (1721)	George Byng, 4th Viscount Torrington	1750	1812	
Viscount Leinster (1747)	William FitzGerald, 2nd Viscount Leinster	1773	1804	Duke of Leinster in the Peerage of Ireland
Viscount Courtenay (1762)	William Courtenay, 2nd Viscount Courtenay	1762	1788	Died
Viscount Courtenay (1762)	William Courtenay, 3rd Viscount Courtenay	1788	1835	
Viscount Wentworth (1762)	Thomas Noel, 2nd Viscount Wentworth	1774	1815	
Viscount Dudley and Ward (1763)	John Ward, 1st Viscount Dudley and Ward	1763	1774	Died
Viscount Dudley and Ward (1763)	William Ward, 3rd Viscount Dudley and Ward	1788	1823	
Viscount Maynard (1766)	Charles Maynard, 2nd Viscount Maynard	1775	1824	
Viscount Hampden (1776)	Robert Hampden-Trevor, 1st Viscount Hampden	1776	1783	Died
Viscount Hampden (1776)	Thomas Hampden-Trevor, 2nd Viscount Hampden	1783	1824	
Viscount Sackville (1782)	George Germain, 1st Viscount Sackville	1782	1785	New creation; died
Viscount Sackville (1782)	Charles Sackville-Germain, 2nd Viscount Sackville	1785	1843	
Viscount Keppel (1782)	Augustus Keppel, 1st Viscount Keppel	1782	1786	New creation; died, title extinct
Viscount Sydney (1789)	Thomas Townshend, 1st Viscount Sydney	1789	1800	New creation

=== Barons ===
Title	Holder	Date gained	Date lost	Notes
Peerage of England
Baron le Despencer (1264)	Francis Dashwood, 11th Baron le Despencer	1763	1781	Died, Barony fell into abeyance
Baron le Despencer (1264)	Thomas Stapleton, 12th Baron le Despencer	1788	1831	Abeyance terminated
Baron Clinton (1299)	Margaret Rolle, 15th Baroness Clinton	1760	1781	Died, title succeeded by the Earl of Orford
Baron Ferrers of Chartley (1299)	George Townshend, 17th Baron Ferrers of Chartley	1770	1811	Created Earl of Leicester, see above
Baron de Clifford (1299)	Edward Southwell, 21st Baron de Clifford	1777	1832	
Baron Audley (1313)	George Thicknesse, 19th Baron Audley	1777	1818	
Baron Willoughby de Eresby (1313)	Priscilla Bertie, 21st Baroness Willoughby de Eresby	1780	1828	Abeyance terminated
Baron Dacre (1321)	Thomas Barrett-Lennard, 17th Baron Dacre	1755	1786	Died
Baron Dacre (1321)	Trevor Charles Roper, 18th Baron Dacre	1786	1794	
Baron Botreaux (1368)	Elizabeth Rawdon, 16th Baroness Botreaux	1789	1808	Title previously held by the Earls of Huntingdon
Baron Stourton (1448)	William Stourton, 16th Baron Stourton	1753	1781	Died
Baron Stourton (1448)	Charles Stourton, 17th Baron Stourton	1781	1816	
Baron Willoughby de Broke (1491)	John Peyto-Verney, 14th Baron Willoughby de Broke	1752	1816	
Baron Paget (1552)	Henry Paget, 9th Baron Paget	1769	1812	Created Earl of Uxbridge, see above
Baron St John of Bletso (1559)	Henry St John, 13th Baron St John of Bletso	1767	1805	
Baron Howard de Walden (1597)	John Griffin, 4th Baron Howard de Walden	1784	1797	Abeyance terminated
Baron Petre (1603)	Robert Petre, 9th Baron Petre	1742	1801	
Baron Saye and Sele (1603)	Thomas Twisleton, 13th Baron Saye and Sele	1781	1788	Died
Baron Saye and Sele (1603)	Gregory Eardley-Twisleton-Fiennes, 14th Baron Saye and Sele	1788	1844	
Baron Arundell of Wardour (1605)	Henry Arundell, 8th Baron Arundell of Wardour	1756	1808	
Baron Dormer (1615)	John Dormer, 7th Baron Dormer	1761	1785	Died
Baron Dormer (1615)	Charles Dormer, 8th Baron Dormer	1785	1804	
Baron Teynham (1616)	Henry Roper, 10th Baron Teynham	1727	1781	Died
Baron Teynham (1616)	Henry Roper, 11th Baron Teynham	1781	1786	
Baron Teynham (1616)	Henry Roper, 12th Baron Teynham	1786	1800	
Baron Craven (1627)	William Craven, 6th Baron Craven	1769	1791	
Baron Strange (1628)	Charlotte Murray, 8th Baroness Strange	1764	1805	
Baron Leigh (1643)	Edward Leigh, 5th Baron Leigh	1749	1786	Died, title extinct
Baron Byron (1643)	William Byron, 5th Baron Byron	1736	1798	
Baron Clifford of Chudleigh (1672)	Hugh Clifford, 4th Baron Clifford of Chudleigh	1732	1783	Died
Baron Clifford of Chudleigh (1672)	Hugh Clifford, 5th Baron Clifford of Chudleigh	1783	1793	
Peerage of Scotland
Lord Somerville (1430)	James Somerville, 14th Lord Somerville	1765	1796	
Lord Forbes (1442)	James Forbes, 16th Lord Forbes	1761	1804	
Lord Saltoun (1445)	George Fraser, 15th Lord Saltoun	1748	1781	Died
Lord Saltoun (1445)	Alexander Fraser, 16th Lord Saltoun	1781	1793	
Lord Gray (1445)	John Gray, 11th Lord Gray	1738	1782	Died
Lord Gray (1445)	Charles Gray, 12th Lord Gray	1782	1786	Died
Lord Gray (1445)	William John Gray, 13th Lord Gray	1782	1807	
Lord Sinclair (1449)	Charles St Clair, 13th Lord Sinclair	1782	1863	Peerage previously under attainder
Lord Cathcart (1460)	William Cathcart, 10th Lord Cathcart	1776	1843	
Lord Sempill (1489)	John Sempill, 13th Lord Sempill	1746	1782	Died
Lord Sempill (1489)	Hugh Sempill, 14th Lord Sempill	1782	1830	
Lord Elphinstone (1509)	Charles Elphinstone, 10th Lord Elphinstone	1757	1781	Died
Lord Elphinstone (1509)	John Elphinstone, 11th Lord Elphinstone	1781	1794	
Lord Torphichen (1564)	James Sandilands, 9th Lord Torphichen	1765	1815	
Lord Lindores (1600)	John Leslie, 8th Lord Lindores	1775	1813	
Lord Colville of Culross (1604)	John Colville, 8th Lord Colville of Culross	1770	1811	
Lord Blantyre (1606)	Alexander Stuart, 10th Lord Blantyre	1776	1783	Died
Lord Blantyre (1606)	Robert Walter Stuart, 11th Lord Blantyre	1783	1830	
Lord Cranstoun (1609)	James Cranstoun, 8th Lord Cranstoun	1778	1796	
Lord Aston of Forfar (1627)	Walter Aston, 8th Lord Aston of Forfar	1763	1805	
Lord Fairfax of Cameron (1627)	Thomas Fairfax, 6th Lord Fairfax of Cameron	1710	1781	Died
Lord Fairfax of Cameron (1627)	Robert Fairfax, 7th Lord Fairfax of Cameron	1781	1793	
Lord Napier (1627)	Francis Napier, 8th Lord Napier	1775	1823	
Lord Reay (1628)	Hugh Mackay, 6th Lord Reay	1768	1797	
Lord Kirkcudbright (1633)	John Maclellan, 8th Lord Kirkcudbright	1762	1801	
Lord Forrester (1633)	Caroline Cockburn of Ormistoun, 8th Lady Forrester	1763	1784	Died
Lord Forrester (1633)	Anna Maria Cockburn of Ormistoun, 9th Lady Forrester	1784	1808	
Lord Banff (1642)	William Ogilvy, 8th Lord Banff	1771	1803	
Lord Elibank (1643)	George Murray, 6th Lord Elibank	1778	1785	Died
Lord Elibank (1643)	Alexander Murray, 7th Lord Elibank	1785	1820	
Lord Belhaven and Stenton (1647)	Robert Hamilton, 6th Lord Belhaven and Stenton	1777	1784	
Lord Belhaven and Stenton (1647)	William Hamilton, 7th Lord Belhaven and Stenton	1784	1814	
Lord Rollo (1651)	John Rollo, 6th Lord Rollo	1763	1783	Died
Lord Rollo (1651)	James Rollo, 7th Lord Rollo	1783	1784	Died
Lord Rollo (1651)	John Rollo, 8th Lord Rollo	1784	1786	
Lord Ruthven of Freeland (1650)	Isobel Ruthven, 4th Lady Ruthven of Freeland	1722	1783	Died
Lord Ruthven of Freeland (1650)	James Ruthven, 5th Lord Ruthven of Freeland	1783	1783	Died
Lord Ruthven of Freeland (1650)	James Ruthven, 6th Lord Ruthven of Freeland	1783	1789	Died
Lord Ruthven of Freeland (1650)	James Ruthven, 7th Lord Ruthven of Freeland	1789	1853	
Lord Bellenden (1661)	John Ker Bellenden, 5th Lord Bellenden	1753	1796	
Lord Kinnaird (1682)	George Kinnaird, 7th Lord Kinnaird	1767	1805	
