= Juliana Osborne, Duchess of Leeds =

English noblewoman (c. 1706 – 1794)

Her Grace The Duchess of Leeds
- Born: Juliana Hele
- Spouses: Peregrine Osborne, 3rd Duke of Leeds (m. 1725; died 1731) Charles Colyear, 2nd Earl of Portmore (m. 1732; died 1785)
- Children: Caroline Curzon, Baroness Scarsdale; Lady Juliana Dawkins; David Colyear, Viscount Milsington; William Colyear, 3rd Earl of Portmore
- Parent(s): Roger Hele; Juliana Prestwood

Juliana Colyear, Countess of Portmore (née Hele, formerly Juliana Osborne, Duchess of Leeds) (c. 1706 – 20 November 1794) was an English noblewoman. She was the third wife of Peregrine Osborne, 3rd Duke of Leeds, and later the wife of Charles Colyear, 2nd Earl of Portmore, and mother of the 3rd Earl.

== Early life ==
Juliana was baptised on 1 May 1706 at South Pool, Devon. She was the daughter and heiress of Roger Hele, of Newton Ferrers in Devonshire, and his wife, the former Juliana Prestwood. After her father's death, her mother married Sir Thomas Putt, 2nd Baronet.

Her paternal grandparents were the former Joan Glanville (eldest daughter of Sir John Glanville) and Sampson Hele, MP for Plympton Erle and Tavistock.

== Personal life ==
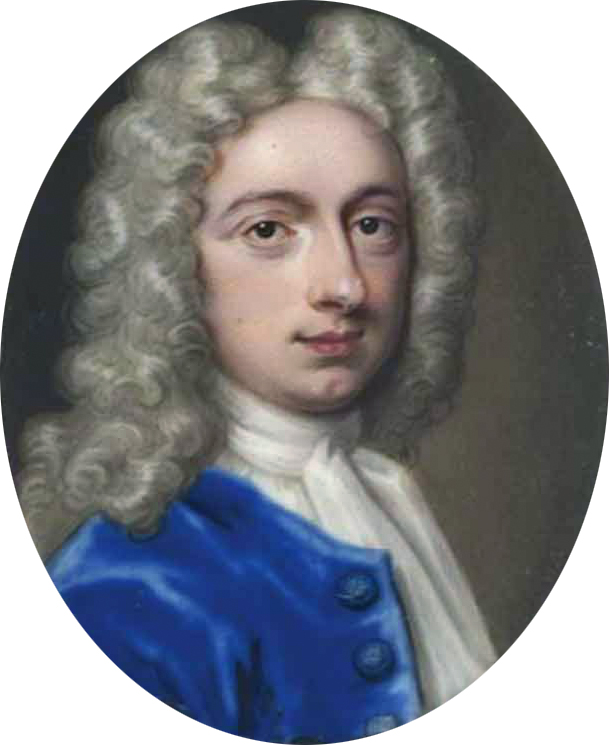
Portrait of her first husband, Lord Leeds, by Christian Friedrich Zincke

On 9 April 1725 she married Peregrine Osborne, styled Marquess of Carmarthen, the future duke at St Anne's Church, Soho. He was the second son, but eldest surviving, of Peregrine Osborne, 2nd Duke of Leeds, and the former Bridget Hyde. Osborne's second wife, the former Lady Anne Seymour (a daughter of Charles Seymour, 6th Duke of Somerset), had died in 1722. There were no children from her marriage to the duke, who already had a son and heir from his first marriage, to Lady Elizabeth Harley (a daughter of Robert Harley, 1st Earl of Oxford and Earl Mortimer). He inherited the dukedom from his father in 1729.

The duchess was one of the signatories to Thomas Coram's petition to establish the Foundling Hospital, which she signed on 24 June 1730. On the duke's early death in 1731, he was succeeded by Juliana's stepson, Thomas.

=== Second marriage ===
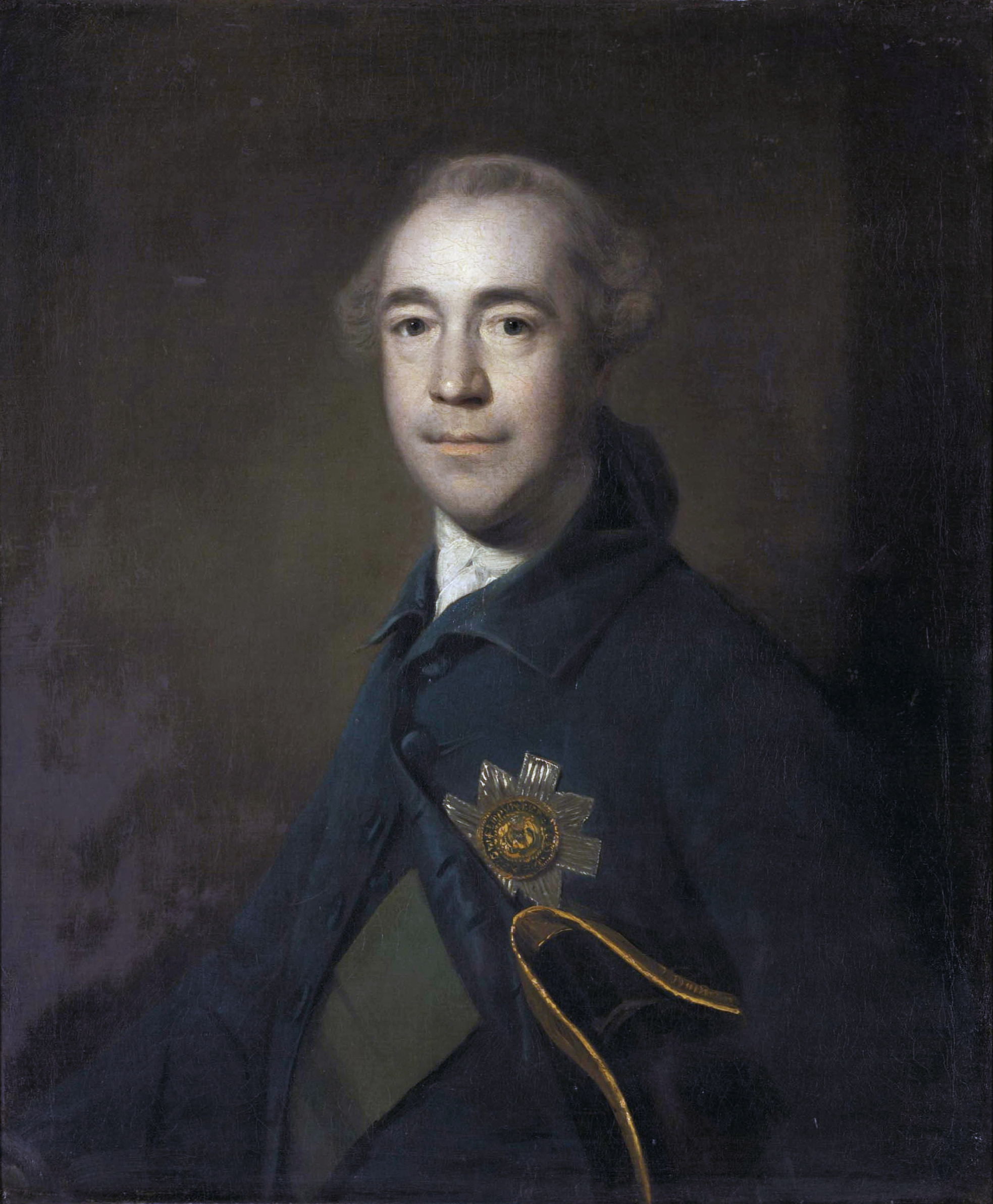
Portrait of her second husband, Lord Portmore, by Joshua Reynolds, 1758

Juliana married Charles Colyear, 2nd Earl of Portmore, on 7 October 1732. The earl, a sporting associate of her first husband, was the son of David Colyear, 1st Earl of Portmore and his wife Catherine Sedley, Countess of Dorchester, daughter of Sir Charles Sedley, 5th Baronet and former mistress of King James II. After her second marriage, Juliana continued to call herself Duchess of Leeds. Their children were:

1. Lady Caroline Colyear (c. 1733–1812), who married Nathaniel Curzon, 1st Baron Scarsdale, and had children
2. Lady Juliana Colyear (c. 1735–1821), who married Henry Dawkins in 1759, and had children
3. David Colyear, Viscount Milsington (1736–1756), who died unmarried while serving in the Coldstream Guards
4. William Charles Colyear, 3rd Earl of Portmore (c. 1745–1823), who married Lady Mary Leslie and had children

Lord Portmore died on 5 July 1785. She died on 20 November 1794 at the age of 88 at Stratford Place, Marylebone.
