= Sir Alexander Colyear, 1st Baronet =

Scottish gentleman

Sir Alexander Colyear, 1st Baronet (born Robertson alias Colyear) (c. 1630 – c. 1685) was a Scottish gentleman who lived most of his life in the Netherlands. He was created a baronet in the Baronetage of England in 1677 and is the ancestor of the Earls of Portmore in the peerage of Scotland.

== Early life ==
Colyear was born in c. 1630, a son of Jean Bruce (c. 1595–1671) and David Robertson, also known by the surname Colyear, of Strowan, Perthshire. The family's alternative surname has also been spelled as Colyer, Colyear, Coljer, Collier, Colier, Coleyer, and Cauleyer. Before his parents’ marriage, his father was married to Clara van der Poll, with whom he had a son named Justinus Colyer, later a Dutch ambassador to the Ottoman Empire. His father served as Chamberlain to his Excellency who became sergeant major of the Sir William Drummond's regiment of the Scots Army in 1649.

His paternal grandparents were Helen and Jacob Colyear, who assumed the surname of Robertson and was said to be descended from the House of Robertson of Struan. His maternal grandparents were John Bruce of Airth and Margaret Elphinstone, a daughter of Alexander Elphinstone, 4th Lord Elphinstone.

Colyear is a Fife name, and families of that name held land near Kirkcaldy, Pitkinny, and Lochgelly.

== Career ==
Alexander Colyear settled in Holland, where he acquired a considerable fortune, and preferred to use the name of Colyear. The author of History and Martial Achievements of the Robertsons of Struan said that he did this "for reasons," but the Dutch records show that in doing so he followed his father's example.

On 20 February 1677, Colyear was created a Baronet, of Holland, in the Baronetage of England. On 24 March 1677, he served as heir general to his sister Joanna.

== Personal life ==
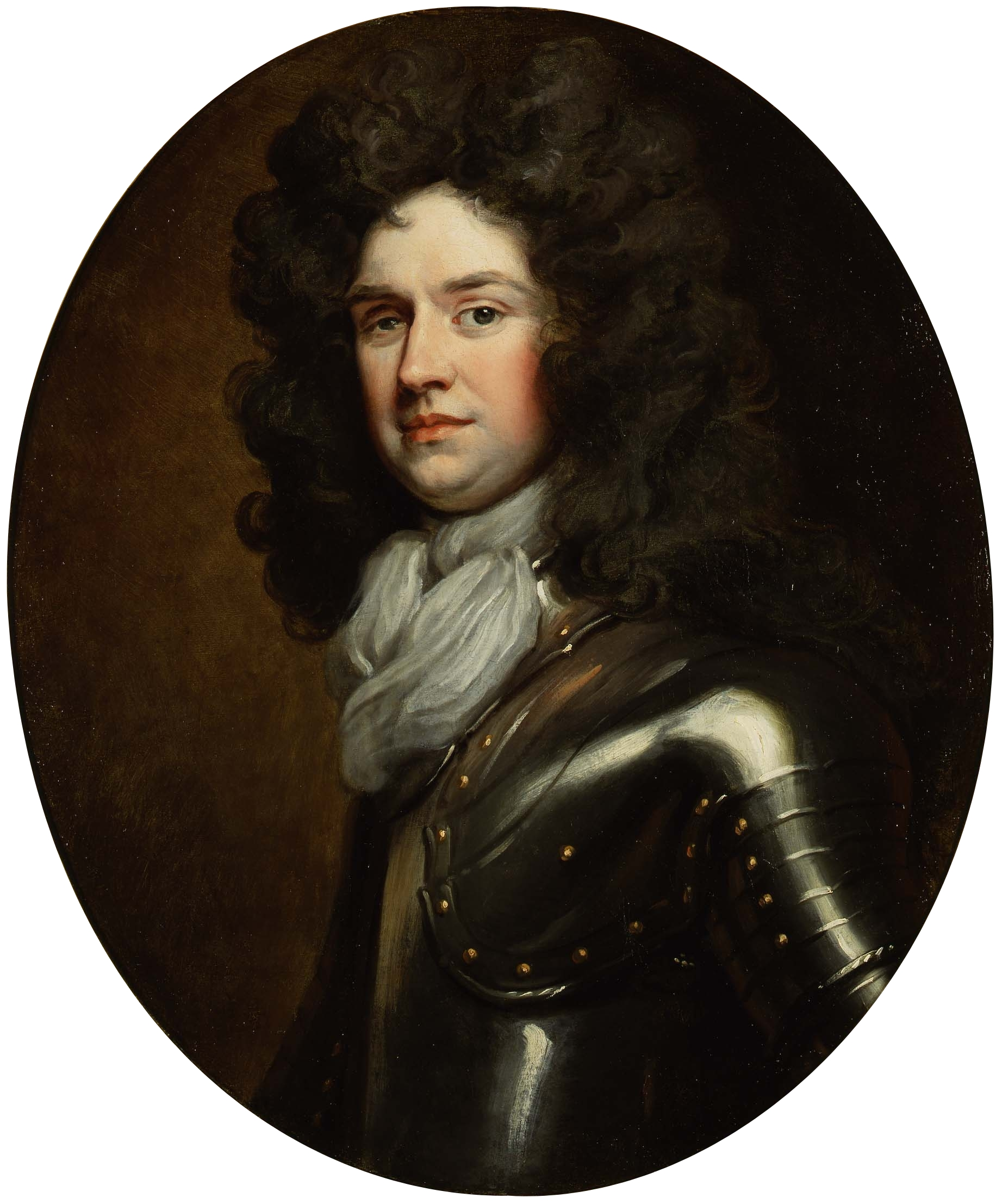
Colyear’s eldest son, David Colyear, 1st Earl of Portmore

Colyear was married to Jean Murray, a daughter of Lt.-Col. Walter Murray, a son of Sir John Murray of Blackbarony and Jean Balfour. Together, they were the parents of several children, including:

- David Colyear, 1st Earl of Portmore (c. 1656–1730), who in 1674 joined the army of William III, Prince of Orange as an English volunteer and was in command of the Scottish Regiment in the service of the States General; he married Catherine Sedley, a daughter of Sir Charles Sedley, 5th Baronet, and a former mistress of King James II who in 1686 created her Countess of Dorchester for life.
- Walter Philip Colyear (1658–1747), Field Marshal of the Dutch Infantry and Governor of Namur in 1718; he married Alida Rhijnsburg van Leyden van Leeuwen, a daughter of Dirck van Leyden van Leeuwen, mayor and alderman of Leiden.

Sir Alexander Colyear died in c. 1685.

=== Descendants ===
Through his eldest son, Colyear was a grandfather of David Colyear, Viscount Milsington (1698–1728/9) and Charles Colyear, 2nd Earl of Portmore (1700–1785), one of the members of parliament for Wycombe and Andover.

Through his second son, Walter, he was a grandfather of Mary Anne Colyear (1683–1754), the wife of Johann Reinhard von Dalwigk zu Lichtenfels, and of Elizabeth Colyear (c. 1689–1768), who became the wife of Lionel Sackville, 1st Duke of Dorset. Elizabeth came to court as a Maid of honour to Queen Anne, a position she inherited from her aunt Catherine Sedley, Countess of Dorchester.

Baronetage of England
| New creation | Baronet (of Holland); 1677–1685 | Succeeded by David Colyear |
