= Thomas Colyear, 4th Earl of Portmore =

British politician

Thomas Charles Colyear, 4th Earl of Portmore (27 March 1772 – 18 January 1835), styled Viscount Milsington from 1785 until 1823, was a British landowner and politician.

== Early life ==
Lord Portmore was the son of William Colyear, 3rd Earl of Portmore and Lady Mary Leslie (1753–1799), second daughter of the 10th Earl of Rothes.

== Career ==
Lord Milsington was an English amateur cricketer who made three known appearances in important matches from 1792 to 1793. He was mainly associated with Hampshire and was an early member of Marylebone Cricket Club.

=== Political career ===
Lord Portmore was a Member of Parliament (MP) for the non-pocket borough of Boston in Lincolnshire, as a Whig, from 1796 to 1802.

== Personal life ==
He was married twice; in 1793 he married Lady Mary Elizabeth Bertie (d. 1797), daughter of Brownlow Bertie, 5th Duke of Ancaster and Kesteven, by whom he had a son:

- Hon. Brownlow Charles Colyear, inherited the personal property of the Duke of Ancaster on his death in 1809, but died in Rome in 1819 due to injuries sustained in a fight with bandits.

In 1828 Lord Portmore married Frances Murrells.

His titles became extinct on his death on 18 January 1835. The estates passed to his cousin James Dawkins (1760–1843), who had also been an MP.

== Arms ==
Coat of arms of Thomas Colyear, 4th Earl of Portmore

Coronet
A Coronet of an Earl
Crest
A Unicorn rampant Argent armed and maned Or
Escutcheon
Gules on a Chevron between three Wolves' Heads erased Or as many Oak Trees eradicated proper fructed Or
Supporters
On either team a Wolf proper
Motto
Avance

== External sources ==
- CricketArchive record
- Leigh Rayment's Peerage Pages
- Leigh Rayment's Historical List of MPs

Parliament of Great Britain
Preceded by Sir Peter Burrell; Thomas Fydell	Member of Parliament for Boston; 1796–1800; With: Thomas Fydell	Succeeded by Parliament of the United Kingdom
Parliament of the United Kingdom
Preceded by Parliament of Great Britain	Member of Parliament for Boston; 1801–1802; With: Thomas Fydell	Succeeded by William Madocks
Peerage of Scotland
Preceded by William Colyear	Earl of Portmore; 1823–1835	Extinct
