= Mary Godolphin =

Mary Godolphin is the name of:

- Mary Godolphin, Duchess of Leeds (1723–1764)
- Mary Godolphin (writer) (1781–1864), English historical writer, biographer, and correspondent
