= James Dawkins (MP, died 1843) =

British politician (1760–1843)

James Colyear Dawkins (born James Dawkins; 1760 – 13 March 1843) was a British politician who served as the Member of Parliament for Chippenham from 1784 to 1812.

== Biography ==
Born 1760, Dawkins was the eldest son of Henry Dawkins II, a wealthy owner of plantations in Jamaica, and his wife Lady Juliana Colyear, daughter of Charles Colyear, 2nd Earl of Portmore. He was educated at Christ Church, Oxford from where he matriculated on 4 May 1779, aged 18. Dawkins succeeded his father as Member for Chippenham, West Wiltshire. Following an election campaign in 1807–1808, which proved very expensive, Dawkins sold his property at Chippenham and was returned in 1812 for Hastings, Sussex retaining the seat until 1826. He then sat for Wilton, in South Wiltshire from 1831 to 1832.

In 1804, Dawkins was commissioned as Colonel of the short-lived 2nd Wiltshire Militia.

Dawkins married in September 1785 to Hannah Phipps, daughter of Thomas Phipps of Heywood, Wiltshire, widow of Charles Long of Grittleton, Wiltshire. They had three children: James (died infant), George-Augustus (1791–1821, without issue) and Caroline-Anne (died unmarried 1857). Secondly, he married in 1814 Maria Forbes, daughter of General Gordon Forbes. He took the name Colyear by royal licence in 1835 after succeeding to the estates of his cousin Thomas Colyear, 4th Earl of Portmore.

An heir to sugar plantations in Jamaica, Dawkins voted against the abolition of slavery in 1796. He owned Friendship and Sandy Gully plantations after 1812. The inheritance included seven sugar estates, three livestock pens, and various smaller properties throughout the island. The plantations included Parnassus, Old Plantation and Sutton's in Clarendon, and Dawkins Caymanas in St Catherine parish.

By 1820, Dawkins had been 35 years in Parliament "without a murmur credited to him in debate". He died on 13 March 1843, aged 83; through his brother he had two neice-heirs, Mrs Juliana Douglas (after husband's elevation to the peerage, Lady Penrhyn) and (by marriage) Lady Emma Sudeley, and one nephew George Douglas-Pennant, 2nd Baron Penrhyn.

== See also ==
- List of MPs in the first United Kingdom Parliament
