= David Colyear, 1st Earl of Portmore =

British army officer (1656–1730)

General The Right Honourable The Earl of Portmore KT PC
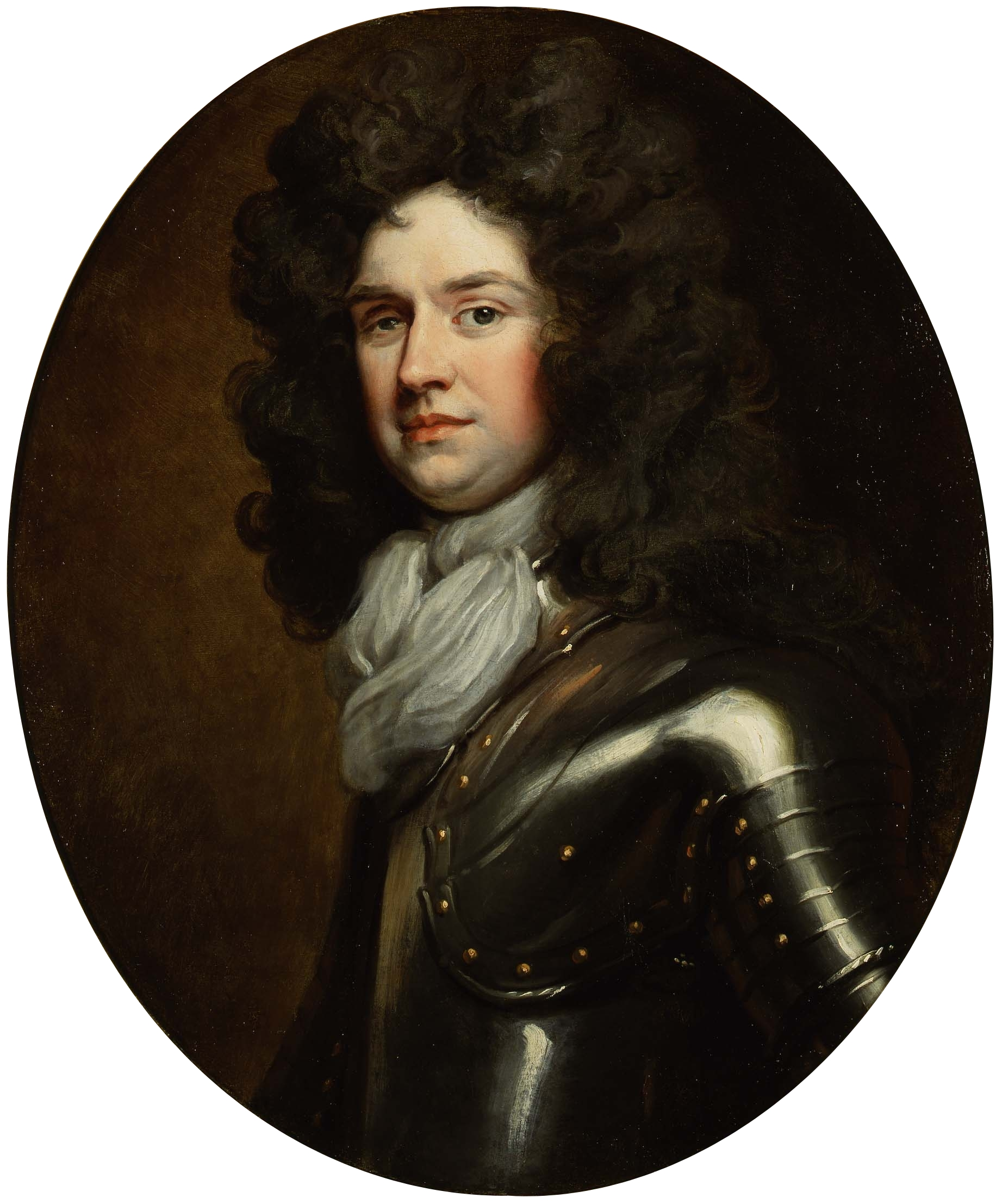
- Portrait by John Baptist Medina, 1690

Governor of Gibraltar
- In office 1713–1720
- Preceded by: Thomas Stanwix
- Succeeded by: Richard Kane

Personal details
- Born: c. 1656 Scotland
- Died: 2 January 1730 (aged 73–74) Weybridge, Surrey
- Spouse: Catherine Sedley, Countess of Dorchester (m. 1696)
- Children: David Colyear, Viscount Milsington; Charles Colyear, 2nd Earl of Portmore

Military service
- Allegiance: Dutch Republic; England; Great Britain
- Branch/service: Dutch States Army; English Army; British Army
- Years of service: 1674–1730
- Rank: General (British Army)
- Battles/wars: Nine Years' War; War of the Spanish Succession; Anglo-Spanish War (1727–1729)

General David Colyear, 1st Earl of Portmore, KT, PC (c. 1656 – 2 January 1730) was a British army officer who served as the governor of Gibraltar from 1713 to 1720.

== Early life ==
He was the elder son of Sir Alexander Colyear, 1st Baronet, of the family of Strowan, Perthshire, who settled in Holland, where he acquired a considerable property, and preferred the name of Colyear.

== Career ==
Colyear was commissioned into the Dutch States Army in 1674, rising to lieutenant general of the Scots Brigade. During the Glorious Revolution, he led the Dutch troops ashore when William of Orange landed at Torbay, Devon on 5 November 1688 before serving in the Williamite War in Ireland, being appointed as governor of Limerick in 1691. For his service in Ireland, Colyear was created Lord Portmore on 1 June 1699. Joining the English Army, in 1702 he was promoted to the rank of major general, and on 27 February 1703 received the command of The Queen's Royal Regiment of Foot. On 13 April 1703, Colyear was made Earl of Portmore, Viscount of Milsington and Lord Colyear.

He took part in the War of Spanish Succession and participated in the Battle of Cádiz in 1702 and the Battle of Vigo Bay later that year. In 1710, Colyear was appointed Commander-in-Chief, Scotland, and in January 1711 was promoted to general. In 1712, he served under the Duke of Ormonde in Flanders, and the same year he was named a member of the privy council and made a Knight of the Thistle.

In August 1713, he was constituted governor of Gibraltar (gazetted November 1714), and in October of the same year he was chosen one of the sixteen representative peers of Scotland. When Gibraltar was besieged by the Spaniards in 1727, he embarked for that place to assume command, but on the approach of Admiral Wager with eleven ships the siege was raised.

== Personal life ==
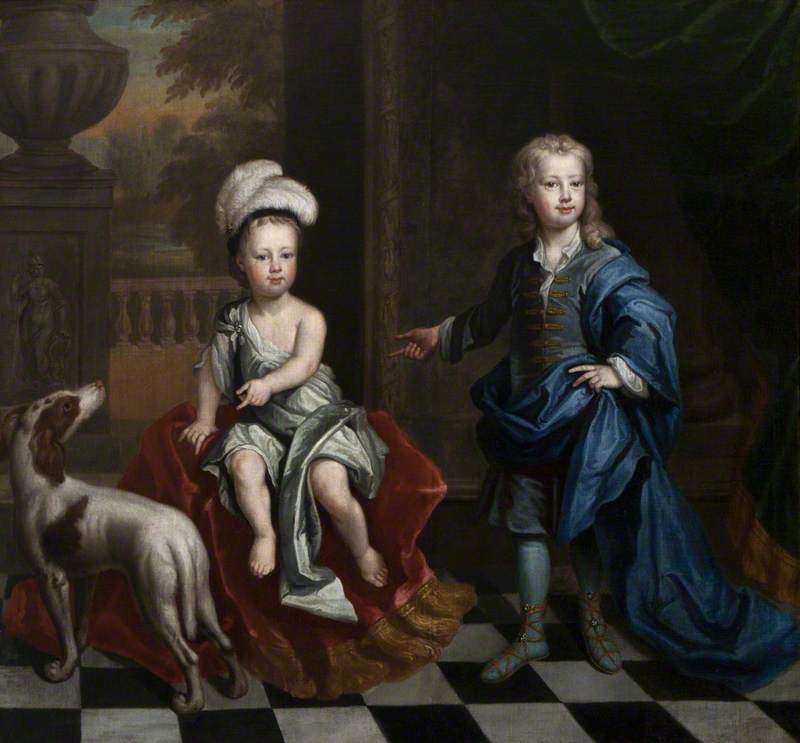
David Colyear had two sons (pictured) with Catherine Sedley, Countess of Dorchester.

He married Catherine created Countess of Dorchester de suo jure (in her own right), (royal mistress, daughter of Sir Charles Sedley, 5th Baronet poet, possessed of the manor of Southfleet, Kent; maternal granddaughter of John Savage, 2nd Earl Rivers). Catherine, a former mistress of James II, had been created Countess of Dorchester for life in 1686. Together, they were the parents of two sons:

- David Colyear, Viscount Milsington (1698–1728/9), who married Bridget Noel, only daughter of Hon. John Noel (second son of Baptist Noel, 3rd Viscount Campden) and Hon. Elizabeth Ingram (widow of Edward Ingram, 2nd Viscount Irvine, sister of Bennet Sherard, 1st Earl of Harborough, and eldest daughter of Bennet Sherard, 2nd Baron Sherard), in 1724.
- Charles Colyear, 2nd Earl of Portmore (1700–1785), who married Juliana Osborne, Duchess of Leeds, widow of Peregrine Osborne, 3rd Duke of Leeds, the daughter and heiress of Roger Hele, of Halewell.

As first Earl, he died 2 January 1730 and was succeeded in the earldom by his second son, Charles stated above.

== Arms ==
Coat of arms of David Colyear, 1st Earl of Portmore
Coronet A Coronet of an Earl Crest A Unicorn rampant Argent armed and maned Or Escutcheon Gules on a Chevron between three Wolves' Heads erased Argent as many Oak Trees eradicated Proper fructed Or Supporters On either side a Wolf proper Motto Avance

Military offices
Preceded by John Wauchope	Colonel of The Earl of Portmore's Regiment of Foot; 1688–1703	Succeeded by Viscount Dalrymple
Preceded by Henry Bellasis	Colonel of The Queen's Royal Regiment of Foot; 1703–1710	Succeeded by Percy Kirke
Preceded by Thomas Stanwix	Governor of Gibraltar; 1713–1720	Succeeded by Richard Kane
Preceded by The Earl of Stair	Colonel of the Grey Dragoons; 1714–1717	Succeeded by Sir James Campbell
Peerage of Scotland
New creation	Earl of Portmore; 1703–1730	Succeeded by Charles Colyear
New creation	Lord Portmore; 1699–1730	Succeeded by Charles Colyear
Baronetage of England
Preceded by Alexander Colyear	Baronet (of Holland); 1685–1730	Succeeded by Charles Colyear
