= John Granby =

John Granby may refer to:

- John Manners, Marquess of Granby (1721 – 1770), British soldier

== See also ==
- John Granby Clay (1766–1846), British Army general
