= Charles Tyrwhitt Dawkins =

British Army general (1858–1919)

Major-General Sir Charles Tyrwhitt Dawkins KCMG CB
- Born: 22 November 1858; Farmington, Gloucestershire
- Died: 4 October 1919 (aged 60); Millbank, Westminster, England
- Burial place: Over Norton Park, Oxfordshire
- Education: Royal Military College, Sandhurst
- Military career
- Allegiance: United Kingdom
- Branch: British Army
- Service years: 1878–1919
- Rank: Major-General
- Unit: King's Shropshire Light Infantry
- Conflicts: Second Anglo-Afghan War; Second Boer War; First World War
- Awards: Knight Commander of the Order of St Michael and St George; Companion of the Order of the Bath; Mentioned in Despatches (7)

Major-General Sir Charles Tyrwhitt Dawkins, KCMG, CB (22 November 1858 – 4 October 1919) was a British Army officer who fought in the Second Anglo-Afghan War and Second Boer War and was Deputy Quartermaster General during the First World War. He died of illness contracted while on active service in France.

== Early life and education ==
Dawkins was born in Farmington, Gloucestershire, the second son of Rev. James Annesley Dawkins of Over Norton Park, Rector of Daylesford, Worcestershire, and son of Henry Dawkins (MP). His mother, Augusta Charlotte Tyrwhitt-Drake, was the fourth daughter of Thomas Drake Tyrwhitt-Drake, of Shardeloes, Buckinghamshire, and sister of Edward Tyrwhitt-Drake. Dawkins was educated at Rugby School from 1874 to 1876, where he was a member of the shooting team. He then attended the Royal Military College, Sandhurst.

== Military career ==
Dawkins began his military career in 1878 when he was gazetted as a gentleman cadet to the King's Shropshire Light Infantry (KSLI). He was immediately deployed to the Second Anglo-Afghan War (1878–1880). He served with the Kurram Valley Field Force and the Zaimusht expedition (29 November – 16 December 1879) under Brigadier-General John Tyler, taking part in the assault of Zawa.

In 1884, Dawkins was appointed aide-de-camp to his future father-in-law, Sir Hercules Robinson, Governor of the Cape of Good Hope. From 1895 to 1897, he served as Military Secretary and Acting Imperial Secretary under Robinson. Dawkins was appointed a Companion of the Order of St Michael and St George in the 1897 Diamond Jubilee Honours.

Dawkins then served throughout the Second Boer War (1899–1902) which began in October 1899. He was severely wounded in South Africa and twice mentioned in despatches. He took part in the actions at Poplar Grove, Driefontein and Houtnek, and in many other operations in the Orange River Colony and Cape Colony. Towards the end of the war, he was in command of the 2nd Battalion, KSLI. He was given the brevet rank of lieutenant colonel, as well as the Queen's and King's South Africa Medals with six clasps.

Dawkins, promoted on 19 August 1905 to lieutenant colonel, when he took command of a battalion of the KSLI, commanded the battalion for the next four years until 19 August 1909 when he relinquished command and was placed on half-pay.

He was then Assistant-Quartermaster-General, Eastern Command, from 1910 to 1914.

On the outbreak of the First World War in August 1914, he was appointed to the General Headquarters Staff in Montreuil-sur-Mer, and was made a temporary brigadier general in October and then a major general in June 1915. He was mentioned five times in despatches throughout the war, dated October 1914, May 1915, April 1916, January 1917, and November 1917, appointed a Companion of the Order of the Bath in 1915, and knighted as a Knight Commander of the Order of St Michael and St George in the 1918 New Year Honours. He was also awarded a series of foreign honours, including the Order of St Vladimir, 4th Class with Swords and Order of St. Anne, 1st Class with Swords from Russia, Commander of the Order of Leopold and Croix de Guerre from Belgium, and the Commander of the Order of Agricultural Merit from France.

Dawkins remained in France following the Armistice of 11 November 1918. In April 1919, he was placed on retirement pay on account of poor health contracted on active service in France. Six months later, he died at Queen Alexandra Military Hospital, Westminster, from illness contracted on active service in France.

== Personal life ==
In 1887, Dawkins married Hon. Neredah Leeta Robinson, youngest daughter of Hercules Robinson, 1st Baron Rosmead, British colonial administrator, and Nea Annesley, daughter of Arthur Annesley, 10th Viscount Valentia. Neredah was a bridesmaid for her sister Nora at her famed wedding to Alexander Kirkman Finlay. They had one son, Charles George Hereward Dawkins (1888–1946), who inherited Over Norton.

== Bibliography ==
- Dawkins, C. T. (1918). Night Operations for Infantry : Compiled for the Use of Company Officers. Aldershot, England: Gale & Polden. OCLC 150634748.
- Dawkins, C. T. (1899). Précis of Information concerning Southern Rhodesia. London: H. M. Stationery Office. OCLC 559343269.
- Dawkins, C. T. (1898). Précis of Information concerning Barotseland. London: H. M. Stationery Office. OCLC 1376467533.
