= Henry Dawkins =

British politician (1728-1814)

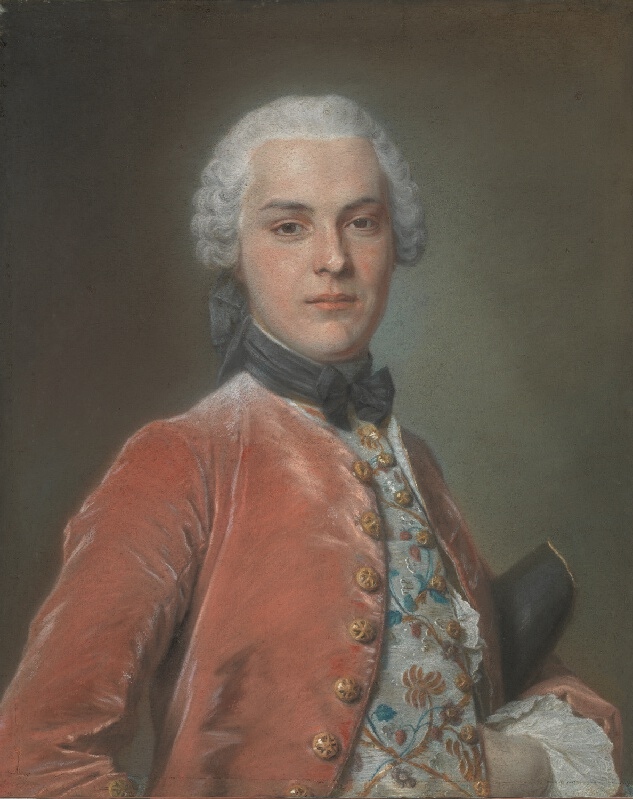
- Portrait by Maurice Quentin de La Tour, c. 1750
- Born: 24 May 1728; Clarendon Parish, Jamaica
- Died: 19 June 1814 (aged 86); London, England
- Resting place: Chipping Norton, London
- Education: Abingdon School; St Mary Hall, Oxford
- Occupation: Slave owner
- Spouse: Lady Juliana Colyear (m. 1759)
- Children: 12
- Relatives: George Hay Dawkins-Pennant (son); Charles Colyear (father-in-law)

Henry Dawkins (24 May 1728 – 19 June 1814) was a British politician.

== Background ==
The Dawkins family settled in Jamaica shortly after its seizure from the Spanish in 1655. William Dawkins (d. 1694) acquired plantations in Jamaica, by grant, in the period 1669 to 1682. These descended to his grandsons James Dawkins I, and the sons of Henry Dawkins I (1698–1744), James Dawkins II and Henry Dawkins II, sons of Henry Dawkins I, all three being MPs. Both James I and James II left property in England to Henry II, who also inherited Jamaican properties from relatives, for an annual income of £40,000 to £50,000. It has been estimated that the gross income of the Jamaican plantations was more than £44,000 in 1775.

At his death in 1744, Henry Dawkins I owned in Jamaica Old Plantation, Parnassus, Friendship, Green River, Leicester Fields, Trout Hall, One Eye, Sandy Gully Pen, Windsor, Folly Pen, Bog Hole Pen, Withywood Pastures and Treadways, including 1,315 slaves in total.

== Life ==
Henry Dawkins was born on 24th May 1728 in Clarendon, Jamaica. He was the third surviving son of Henry Dawkins I (1698–1744), a slave-owner, sugar planter, and his wife, Elizabeth (1698–1737), daughter of Edward Pennant of Clarendon, chief justice of Jamaica and of Elizabet Moore. His brothers were plantation and slave-owner James Dawkins II, his eldest brother and the elder brother, major slave owner William Dawkins (1726–1753).

He studied at John Roysse's Free School in Abingdon, (now Abingdon School) c. 1739-1744 and St Mary Hall, Oxford from 1745. Dawkins's father on his death in 1744 bequeathed 25,000 acres of land and approximately £100,000 to his three surviving sons. James, the eldest son (James Dawkins II, who died in 1757), inherited 14,300 acres, William (died in 1753, without issue) received 5,000, and Henry 5,700. By c. 1750 he owned 20,000 acres in Jamaica (St Elizabeth, Clarendon and Vere) and of estates in Wiltshire and Oxfordshire. By 1809 he owned the total of 1,464 slaves on the estates of Parnassus, Folly, Old Plantation, Friendship and Suttons.

From 1752 to 1758 Henry Dawkins was a member of the assembly in Jamaica, and was then on the council to 1759. In 1760 he entered the Parliament of Great Britain as member for Southampton, holding the seat to 1768. He then was member for Chippenham, Hindon and Chippenham again, leaving Parliament finally in 1784. He served for a 24-year period with only short breaks (one caused by his defeat at Salisbury, near his estate at Standlynch, in 1768). He was a Steward of the Old Abingdonian Club in 1769.

According to the Oxford Dictionary of National Biography, there is no record of Dawkins having spoken in the House of Commons. However, from 1773 to 1805 he was a member of the Society of West India Planters and Merchants, a pressure group. His son James succeeded him at Chippenham.

He died 19 June 1814 in London and was buried at Chipping Norton. His wealth at death was £150,000.

== Properties in England ==
Dawkins sold his brother's estate at Laverstoke in Hampshire in 1759. In 1766 he inherited Over Norton Park in Oxfordshire from his uncle James Dawkins. He kept this property (which remains in the Dawkins family to this day). The family also rented a London property in Upper Brook Street.

=== Standlynch House ===
Also in 1764 he bought Standlynch Park in Wiltshire. This house, now called Trafalgar Park, was bought from William Young for £22,000. When Dawkins died in 1814, Standlynch Park was sold for £90,000 to William Nelson, 1st Earl Nelson, who had been voted the money needed to purchase an estate by Parliament. He changed the name to Trafalgar House and Park.

== Intellectual interests ==
Dawkins was a patron of neoclassical architects. He had alterations done to Standlynch House (a building by the architect John James dating from the 1730s). Dawkins had work done on the wings, by John Wood, the Younger, and on the portico by Nicholas Revett. Revett was an associate of Dawkins' brother James, who had antiquarian interests. Revett and both Dawkins brothers were members of the Society of Dilettanti. As can be seen from the original floor plans signed by J. Wood Arch, Dawkins seems to have built the north wing for himself and his wife Lady Juliana, while the south wing mainly housed the dining room, kitchen and brewery.

He was elected a Fellow of the Royal Society in 1778.

== Family ==
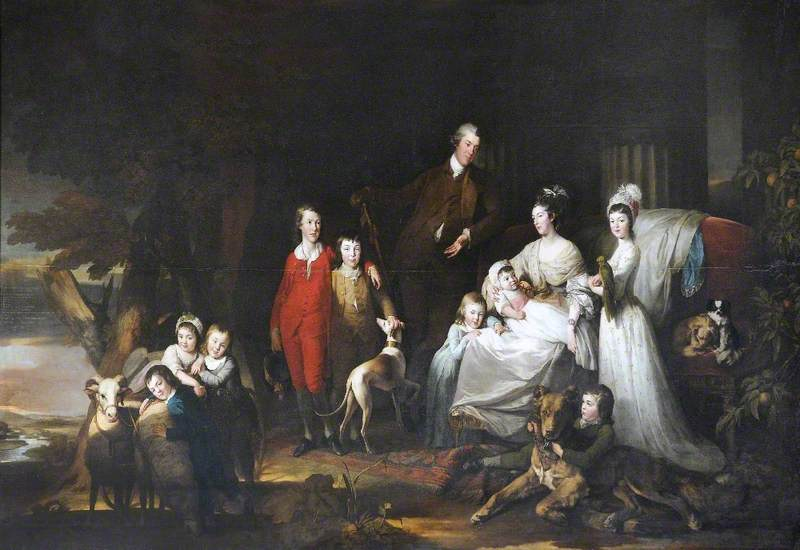
The family of Henry Dawkins, c. 1774, by Richard Brompton

Dawkins married in 1759, Lady Juliana Colyear (1735–1821), daughter of Charles Colyear, 2nd Earl of Portmore and Juliana Hele. They had eight sons and four daughters. The sons were:

- James (1760–1843), Member of Parliament, married in 1785 Hannah Phipps, and secondly in 1814 Maria Forbes, daughter of General Gordon Forbes
- George Hay (1764–1840), Member of Parliament, married in 1807 Sophia Mary Maude, daughter of Cornwallis Maude, 1st Viscount Hawarden, and in 1814 Elizabeth, daughter of William Henry Bouverie
- Henry Dawkins (1765–1852), Member of Parliament for Boroughbridge, married in 1788 Augusta, daughter of Sir Henry Clinton, father of Henry Dawkins (1788–1864), also Member of Parliament for Boroughbridge
- William, died an infant 1766
- Richard (1768–1818), married Jane Catherine Long, daughter of Edward Long and Mary Ballard Beckford
- Edward (1769–1816), took holy orders
- Charles (1772–1799), officer in the Grenadier Guards, died after a battle in Holland
- John (1774–1844), Fellow of All Souls College, Oxford and barrister

The daughters were:

- Augusta, died an infant 1761/62?
- Elizabeth (1761/62?–1831), married in 1795 William Ronke Leeds Sergeantson or William Rookes Leedes Serjeantson or W. Serjeantson, Esq. of Camphill, Yorkshire, leaving issue
- Juliana (b. 1762/63/67?), died unmarried in 1847
- Susanna (1773/75/76?–1830), married in 1804 Sir Edward Dodsworth, 2nd Baronet.

Henry was the great-great-great-grandfather of the biologist Professor Richard Dawkins. In 2010 Richard Dawkins wrote an obituary for his father, describing how John Dawkins had inherited Over Norton Park from a distant cousin and how the estate, in the Cotswolds Area of Outstanding Natural Beauty, had been in the family since the 1720s.

The widowed Lady Juliana retired to Upper Brook Street, Mayfair, where she lived until her death in 1821.

== See also ==
- List of Old Abingdonians
