= John Granby Clay =

British Army general

John Granby Clay (1766–1846), was a British Army general.

== Early career ==
Clay was appointed ensign on 6 Nov 1782, in a Scottish independent company, commanded by Captain, afterwards Lieutenant-Colonel James Abercrombie, then stationed in the north of England. He was placed on half-pay when the company was reduced some months later, but exchanged to full pay in the 45th Regiment of Foot in December 1784, and joining that regiment in Ireland, accompanied it to the West Indies in 1786. He obtained his lieutenancy on 30 April 1788. In 1794, he served with the 2nd provisional battalion of light infantry in the expedition against Martinique, and highly distinguished himself at St. Pierre on the windward side of the island, where he led the forlorn hope in the attack on Morne du Pin. His party consisted of a sergeant and twelve men. With a few of them he gained the summit in rear of the enemy's position just at daybreak. Finding themselves unexpectedly assailed from that quarter, the French precipitately retreated, leaving a brass field-gun in the captors' hands, but not until after the officer in command had been wounded by Clay.

== Service at home ==
After serving at the sieges of Forts Louis and Bourbon, and at the capture of St. Lucia, Clay returned home and purchased a company in the 105th Regiment of Foot, then raising at Leeds, in which, by priority of army service, he became senior captain, and, in 1795, major, but the regiment being drafted into others soon after, he was placed on half-pay. In 1797-9, he served on the staff as brigade-major to Major-General Cornelius Cuyler at Brighton, and to Major-General Samuel Hulse at Lewes, and elsewhere in Kent and Sussex, and during the same period was detached for a time with the brigade of guards sent to Ireland in 1798. In 1800, a number of line regiments formed second battalions from the militia, the men being enlisted for two years or the continuance of the war, among them being the 54th Regiment of Foot, in which Clay was appointed major on 19 May 1800.

== Service overseas ==
He accompanied the battalion to Quiberon, Ferrol, and Cádiz, and afterwards to Egypt, where he was present in the actions of 12–13 March 1801, and at the siege of Alexandria, and had his horse killed under him at Marabout on 21 Aug. during General Eyre Coote's operations against the city from the westward. For his services in Egypt, he received the insignia of the Ottoman Order of the Crescent, and also the gold medal given by the Porte. His battalion ceasing to exist at the peace, Clay was again placed on half-pay. After the renewal of the war, he was brought into the 3rd Buffs, and sent to London to assist in organising the battalions of the army of reserve in Middlesex, London, and the Tower Hamlets, and in June 1804 was appointed assistant inspector-general of that force, returns of which will be found in the Annual Register, 1804, pp. 567–70.

== Disturbances in Manchester ==
On its dissolution soon after, Clay was appointed to a lieutenant-colonelcy on half-pay of the 24th Dragoons, and made inspecting field-officer of the Manchester recruiting district. He was senior military officer there in May 1808, when very serious disturbances broke out among the operatives in Manchester and the neighbouring towns, which he succeeded in suppressing in a few days with a very small force, and received the special thanks of General Champagné, commanding the north-west district. Four years later, riots again occurred, but a timely example made at Middleton, where the mob attacked the mill and burned the dwelling-house of Mr. Burton, a leading manufacturer, and attempted to fire on the troops, so completely dismayed them, that they ceased to assemble in any large numbers. On the arrival of three militia regiments as reinforcements, Clay was appointed to the command of a brigade at Manchester.
