= John Leslie, 11th Earl of Rothes =

Scottish peer

Coat of arms of every Earl of Rothes since 1457

John Leslie (19 October 1744 – 18 June 1773) was the 11th Earl of Rothes; he was Earl from 10 December 1767 until his death on 18 June 1773.

He was the son of the 10th Earl, who was also named John Leslie, and his first wife Hannah Howard who was the Countess of Rothes and died in 1761. She was the daughter of Matthew Howard of Thorpe, Norfolk, and his wife Britannia Cole.

He married Jane Maitland, daughter of Captain Thomas Maitland, on 4 April 1768, but they had no children. After his death, the title passed to his sister Jane Elizabeth Leslie, 12th Countess of Rothes who was six years younger. She defeated an attempt by her uncle Andrew Leslie to claim the title, following a lengthy lawsuit. The 11th Earl's widow remarried Patrick Maitland, younger son of the 6th Earl of Lauderdale.

== See also ==
- Earl of Rothes

Peerage of Scotland
Preceded by John Leslie	Earl of Rothes; 1767–1773	Succeeded by Jane Leslie
