= Peregrine Osborne, 3rd Duke of Leeds =

British peer

His Grace The Duke of Leeds
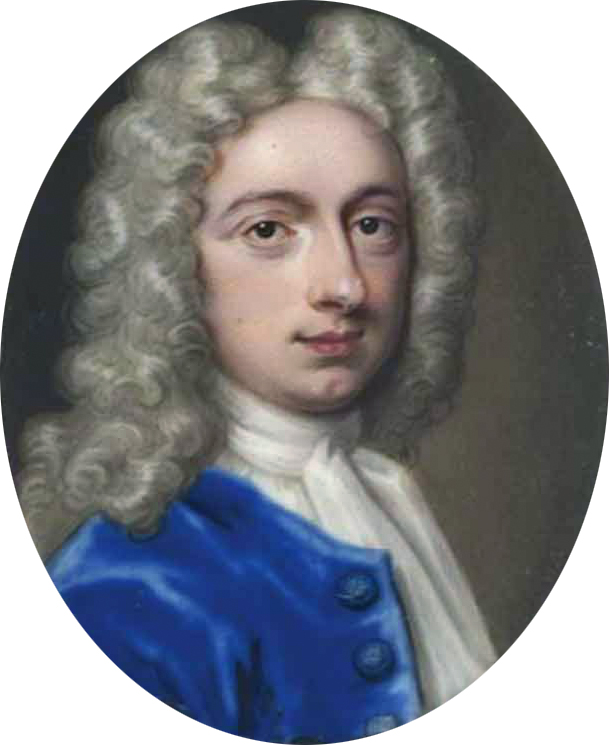
- Portrait of Lord Leeds, by Christian Friedrich Zincke
- Born: Peregrine Hyde Osborne; 11 November 1691
- Died: 9 May 1731 (aged 39)
- Spouses: Lady Elizabeth Harley (m. 1712; died 1713) Lady Anne Seymour (m. 1719; died 1722) Juliana Hele (m. 1725)
- Children: Thomas Osborne, 4th Duke of Leeds
- Parent(s): Peregrine Osborne, 2nd Duke of Leeds; Bridget Hyde

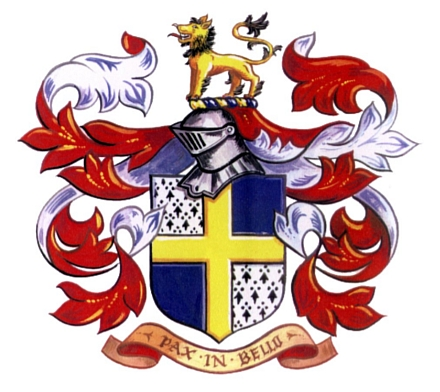
Ancestral arms of the Osborne family, Dukes of Leeds

Peregrine Hyde Osborne, 3rd Duke of Leeds (11 November 1691 – 9 May 1731) was a British peer.

== Early life ==
He was the second son of Peregrine, Earl of Danby and his wife, the former Bridget Hyde, only daughter of Sir Thomas Hyde, 2nd Baronet.

In 1694, when his grandfather, the 1st Marquess of Carmarthen, was created Duke of Leeds, and his father assumed the title Marquess of Carmarthen, he became Lord Peregrine Osborne.

== Career ==
In 1709, he began his Grand Tour together with his older brother William, Earl of Danby, who died of smallpox in Utrecht in 1711, at which point Osborne assumed the title Earl of Danby. In 1712, when his father succeeded as 2nd Duke of Leeds, he became Marquess of Carmarthen. Lord Carmarthen was summoned to the House of Lords in his father's most junior title as 3rd Baron Osborne by a writ in acceleration in January 1713 and succeeded to his father's other titles in 1729.

From 1712 to 1713, he served as Lord Lieutenant of the East Riding of Yorkshire.

== Personal life ==
On 16 December 1712, he married firstly Lady Elizabeth Harley, youngest daughter of the 1st Earl of Oxford and Earl Mortimer. She died in the childbed only a year later.

- Thomas Osborne, 4th Duke of Leeds (1713–1789), who married Lady Mary Godolphin, second daughter of Francis Godolphin, 2nd Earl of Godolphin and his wife Henrietta Godolphin (née Churchill), 2nd Duchess of Marlborough, in 1740.

On 17 September 1719, he married secondly to Lady Anne Seymour, third daughter of Charles Seymour, 6th Duke of Somerset by his first wife, Lady Elizabeth Thynne, styled Baroness Percy (only child of Josceline Percy, 11th Earl of Northumberland). A son, who originated from this marriage, died young.

After her death in 1722, he married finally, on 9 April 1725 at St Anne's Church, Soho, Juliana Hele, a daughter and co-heiress of Roger Hele of Holwell in the parish of Newton Ferrers, Devon.

The Duke of Leeds died, aged 40, and was buried in the Osborne family chapel at All Hallows Church, Harthill, South Yorkshire. He was succeeded in his titles by his only surviving child, Thomas, Marquess of Carmarthen, born by his first wife.

Peerage of England
Preceded by Peregrine Osborne	Duke of Leeds; 1729–1731	Succeeded by Thomas Osborne
Preceded by Peregrine Osborne	Baron Osborne (writ in acceleration); 1713–1731	Succeeded by Thomas Osborne
