= Charles Colyear, 2nd Earl of Portmore =

British politician (1700–1785)

The Right Honourable The Earl of Portmore KT
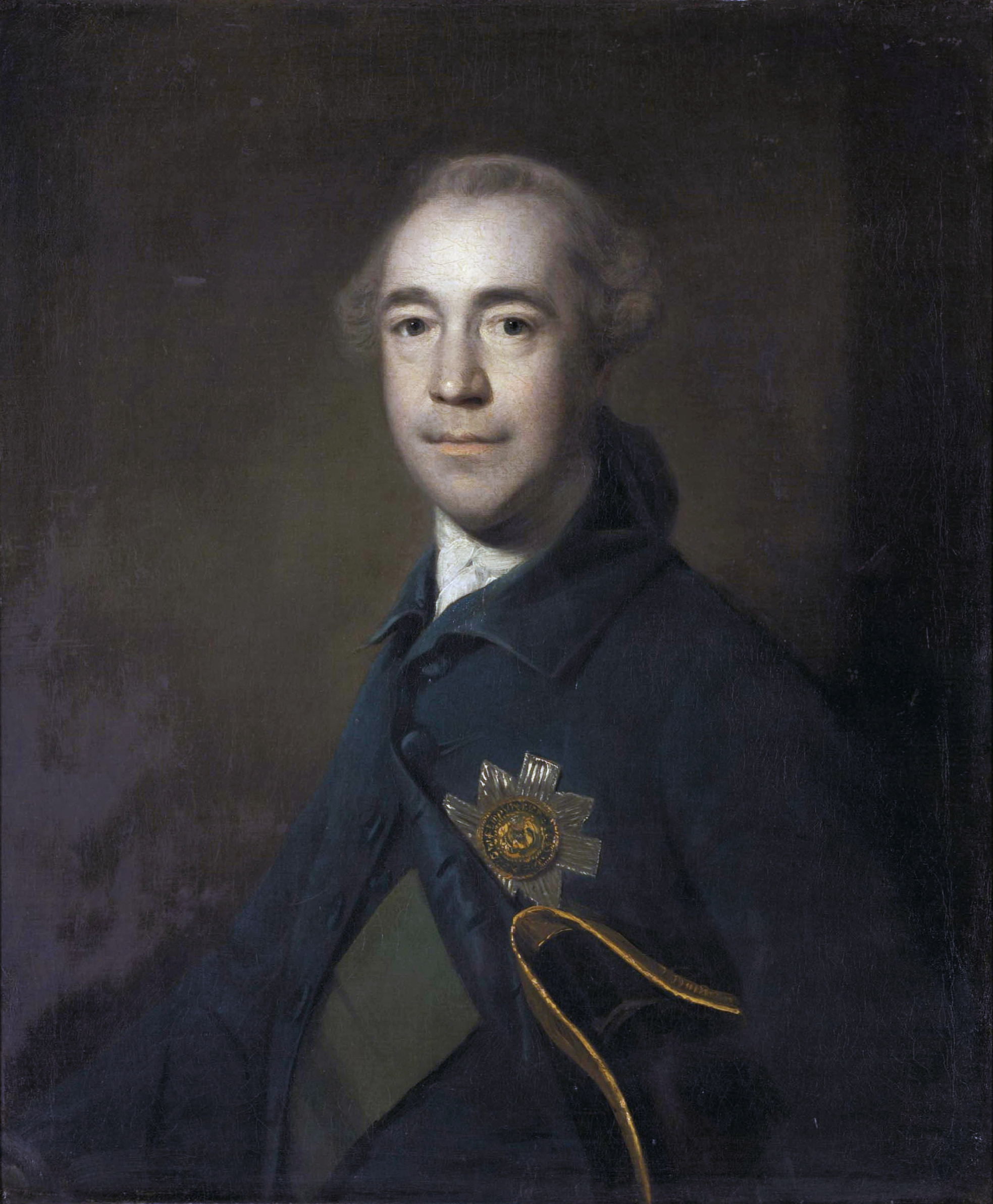
- Portrait of Lord Portmore, by Joshua Reynolds, 1758

Member of Parliament for Andover
- In office 1727–1730 Serving with James Brudenell
- Preceded by: William Guidott; James Brudenell
- Succeeded by: James Brudenell; William Guidott

Member of Parliament for Wycombe
- In office 1726–1726 Serving with The Lord Shelburne
- Preceded by: Charles Egerton; The Lord Shelburne
- Succeeded by: The Lord Shelburne; Harry Waller

Personal details
- Born: Charles Colyear; 27 August 1700
- Died: 5 July 1785 (aged 84)
- Spouse: Juliana Osborne, Duchess of Leeds (m. 1732)
- Parent(s): David Colyear, 1st Earl of Portmore; Catherine Sedley, Countess of Dorchester

Charles Colyear, 2nd Earl of Portmore, KT (27 August 1700 – 5 July 1785), known as Lord Milsington to 1730, of Portmore House, Weybridge, Surrey, was a British Whig politician who sat in the House of Commons between 1726 and 1730, when he succeeded to the peerage as Earl of Portmore. He subsequently became a Scottish representative peer in the House of Lords. He was a racehorse owner and was known as Beau Colyear for his conspicuous dress.

== Early life ==
Colyear was the son of David Colyear, 1st Earl of Portmore and his wife Catherine Sedley, Countess of Dorchester, daughter of Sir Charles Sedley, 5th Baronet, MP, of Aylesford, Kent, and former mistress of James II. His mother was the owner of Portmore House, Weybridge, which became the seat of the Earls of Portmore. In 1719, he was page to the Princess of Wales.

== Career ==
Milsington was returned as Member of Parliament for Wycombe on the Wharton interest at a by-election on 1 February 1726 but on account of the partiality of the returning officer, the election was declared void on 22 February. At the subsequent rerun of the by-election on 3 March he was again returned as MP through the partiality of the returning officer, but was unseated on petition on 17 March. At the 1727 British general election he was returned as MP Andover in a contest. He voted with the Administration on the civil list arrears in 1729.

On 2 January 1730 Milsington succeeded to the peerage on the death of his father and vacated his seat in the House of Commons. In February 1732, he was sent as envoy to Don Carlos, when he took possession of Parma and Piacenza. He was made a knight of the Order of the Thistle on 2 June 1732. From 1734 to 1737, he was a Scottish representative peer in the House of Lords.

=== Society ===
Portmore was a leading racehorse owner and owned among others, Crab and Squirt. He became well known in high society for the splendour of his dress and equipages. He was a founding Governor of the Foundling Hospital, a charity created in 1739, dedicated to the salvation of abandoned children.

== Personal life ==
On 7 October 1732, Lord Portmore married Juliana Osborne, Duchess of Leeds, daughter of Roger Hele of Halwell, Devon, and widow of Peregrine Osborne, 3rd Duke of Leeds Together, they were the parents of:

1. Caroline Colyear (c. 1733–1812), who married Nathaniel Curzon, 1st Baron Scarsdale.
2. Juliana Colyear (1735–1821), who married Henry Dawkins in 1759.
3. David Colyear, Viscount Milsington (1736–1756), who died unmarried.
4. William Charles Colyear, 3rd Earl of Portmore (1745–1823), who married Lady Mary Leslie, second daughter of John Leslie, 10th Earl of Rothes.

Lord Portmore also had an illegitimate daughter by Elizabeth Collier:

- Elizabeth Collier (1747–1832), who married Col. Edward Pole (1718–1780). After his death, she married, as his second wife, Dr. Erasmus Darwin (grandfather of Charles Darwin from his first marriage).

Lord Portmore died on 5 July 1785. His widow died on 20 November 1794.

== Arms ==
Coat of arms of Charles Colyear, 2nd Earl of Portmore
Coronet A Coronet of an Earl Crest A Unicorn rampant Argent armed and maned Or Escutcheon Gules on a Chevron between three Wolves' Heads erased Argent as many Oak Trees eradicated proper fructed Or Supporters On either side a Wolf proper Motto Avance

== Notes ==
Parliament of Great Britain
Preceded by Charles Egerton; The Lord Shelburne	Member of Parliament for Wycombe; 1726; With: The Lord Shelburne	Succeeded by The Lord Shelburne; Harry Waller
Preceded by William Guidott; James Brudenell	Member of Parliament for Andover; 1727–1730; With: James Brudenell	Succeeded by James Brudenell; William Guidott
Peerage of Scotland
Preceded by David Colyear	Earl of Portmore; 1730–1785	Succeeded by William Colyear
