= Jane Leslie, 12th Countess of Rothes =

Painting of Jane Elizabeth Leslie, Countess of Rothes

Jane Elizabeth Leslie, 12th Countess of Rothes (5 May 1750 – 1810) was a Scottish noblewoman.

She was the daughter of John Leslie, 10th Earl of Rothes, and his first wife Hannah Howard, daughter of Matthew Howard of Thorp, Norfolk, and his wife Britannia Cole. She succeeded her brother, John Leslie, the 11th Earl of Rothes, in 1773 in the peerage and estates of Rothes and effectually vindicated her right to the estates against the claim of her uncle Andrew Leslie, both in the Court of Session and the House of Lords.

She was twice married; first in 1766, to George Raymond Evelyn, youngest son of William Evelyn Glanville of St Clere, Kent, with whom she had three sons, and secondly, in 1772, to Sir Lucas Pepys, 1st Baronet, an eminent physician and uncle of the first Earl of Cottenham. By both marriages she had issues, and after her death, was succeeded by the only surviving son of her first marriage, George William Evelyn-Leslie, the 13th Earl of Rothes. She had nine children in total; two daughters and seven sons. She died on 2 June 1810 at the age of 60, in Wembley.

Peerage of Scotland
Preceded by John Leslie	Countess of Rothes; 1773–1810	Succeeded by George Evelyn-Leslie
