= Over Norton Park =

Farm in Oxfordshire, England

Coordinates: 51.9559°N 1.5371°W

Over Norton Park is a farm of 210 acres (85 ha) at Over Norton, lying to the north of Chipping Norton, in the Cotswolds, Oxfordshire, England. It has been in the Dawkins family since the 1720s.

== History ==
The estate at Over Norton was bought in 1726 by James Dawkins (c. 1696–1766), the son of Colonel Richard Dawkins of Jamaica, and a Member of Parliament for Woodstock in Oxfordshire. He was the uncle of Henry Dawkins the Younger (1728–1814), who inherited the property on his death. A Bodleian Library page comments on the build-up of Dawkins family holdings in the Chipping Norton area, including the purchase of Salford Manor by Henry Dawkins II.

Down through the generations, Over Norton belonged to Henry Dawkins (1765–1852) (Henry Dawkins III), third son of Henry Dawkins; then Henry Dawkins (1788–1864) (Henry Dawkins IV), both Members of Parliament for Boroughbridge in Yorkshire, then to William Gregory Dawkins (1825–1914), passing down to the eldest sons. William Gregory Dawkins replaced the Georgian mansion in 1874. By 1945, a much-reduced estate was in the hands of his great-nephew Hereward Dawkins.

It was inherited by John Dawkins (1915–2010), the father of the biologist Richard Dawkins. Under John Dawkins' management it became a single commercial farm which he farmed himself, and the big house was split into flats.

The passing of Over Norton to another branch of the Dawkins family went back to the line of another son of Henry Dawkins III, Clinton George Augustus Dawkins (1808–1871). He was the great-grandfather of John Dawkins.
