= William Colyear, 3rd Earl of Portmore =

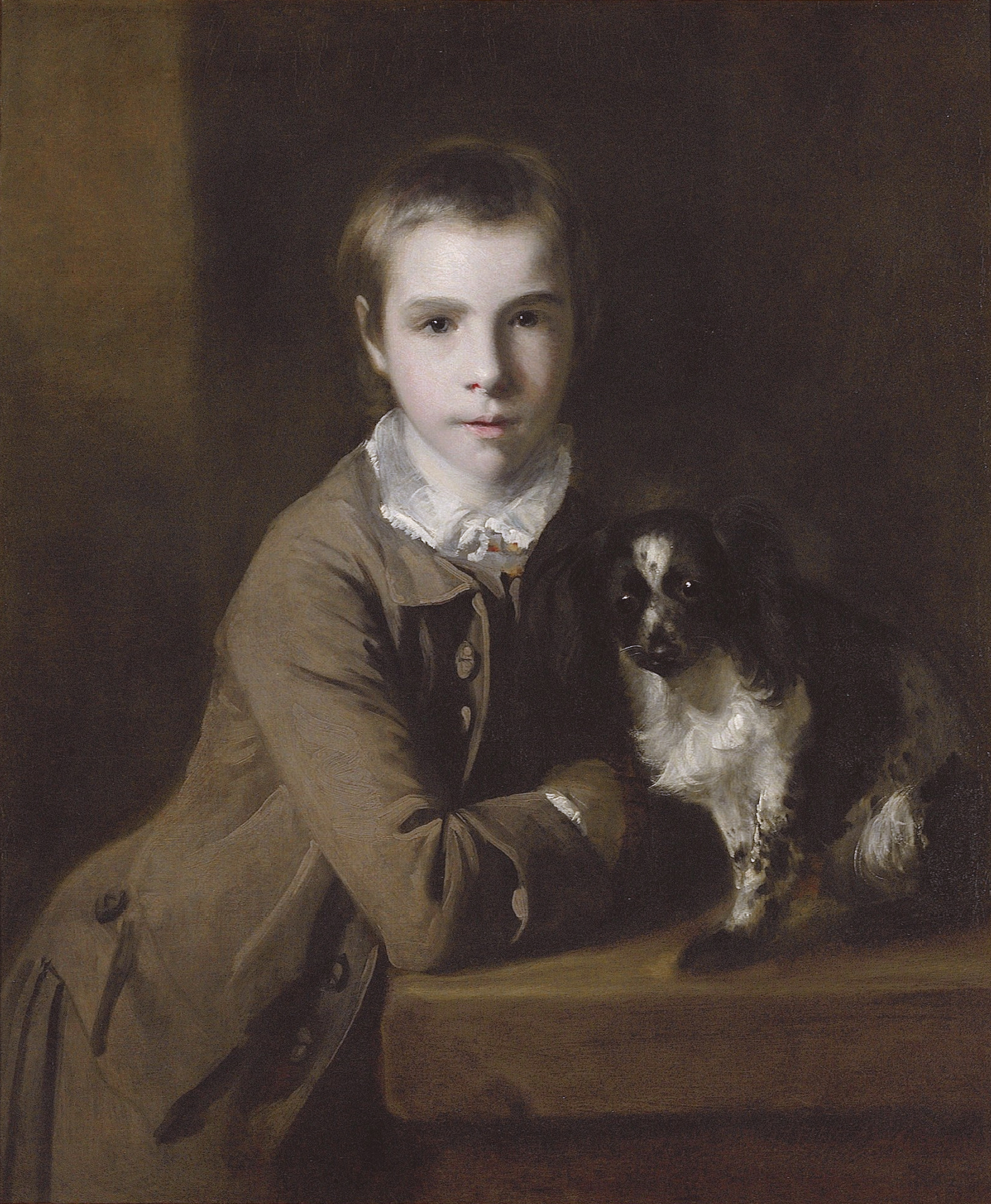
Portrait of Colyear by Joshua Reynolds when he was a boy, 1759.

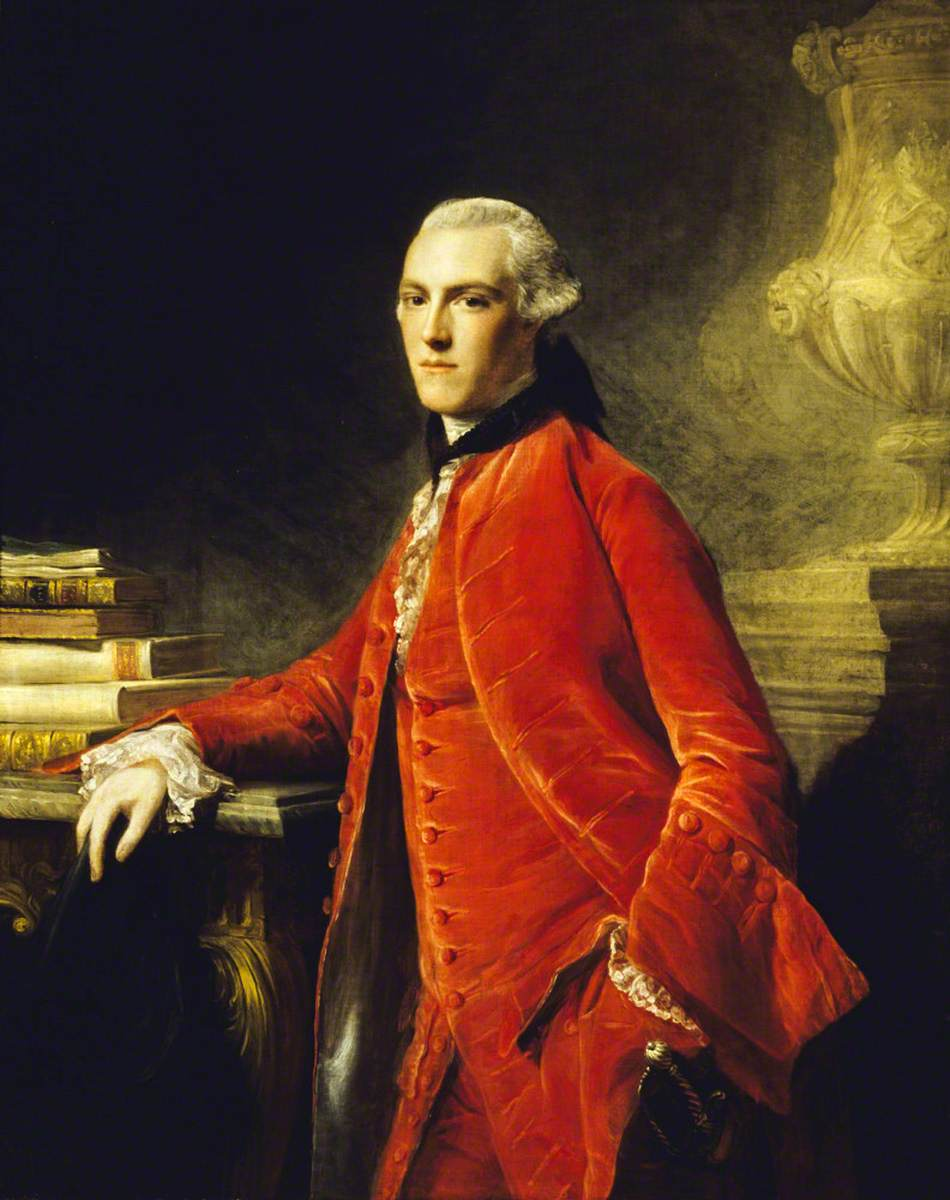
Portrait by Allan Ramsay, 1764-1765.

William Charles Colyear, 3rd Earl of Portmore (1745 – 1823) was a British peer, styled Viscount Milsington until 1785.

== Early life ==
He was the second but only surviving son of Charles Colyear, 2nd Earl of Portmore, and his wife Juliana. He was styled Viscount Milsingtion in 1756 on the death of his brother David.

Milsington was educated at Eton and St John's College, Cambridge. In 1774, he unsuccessfully contested the constituency of Evesham as a Tory.

== Career ==
Like his father the earl, Viscount Milsington was a racehorse owner; he and his wife were regular racegoers. His grey mare, Tiffany, won the 50-pound weight-for-age race at Salisbury Races in 1780 and his horse Scarf ran in the 1781 Derby.

He succeeded as the 3rd Earl of Portmore on the death of his father in 1785.

== Personal life ==
On 5 November 1770, he married Mary Leslie (1753–99), second daughter of the 10th Earl of Rothes. Their children included:

- Thomas Charles Colyear, 4th Earl of Portmore (1772–1835), who married Lady Mary Elizabeth Bertie and had one son; there were no children from his second marriage, to Frances Murrells.
- Hon William Colyear
- Hon Francis Colyear (1781–1787)
- Lieutenant Hon John David Colyear (died 1801)
- Lady Mary Colyear (1773–1800)
- Lady Julia Colyear (1774–1800)
- Lady Catherine Caroline Colyear, who married James Bracknell

The deaths of the couple's two daughters, Lady Mary and Lady Julia, in Bath, within three hours of one another on the same day in 1800, were the subject of a poem by Mary Young Sewell.

He died in London in 1823 and was succeeded by his son Thomas Charles Colyear, 4th Earl of Portmore.

== Arms ==
Coat of arms of William Colyear, 3rd Earl of Portmore

Coronet
A Coronet of an Earl
Crest
A Unicorn rampant Argent armed and maned Or
Escutcheon
Gules on a Chevron between three Wolves' Heads erased Or as many Oak Trees eradicated proper fructed Or
Supporters
On either side a Wolf proper
Motto
Avance

Peerage of Scotland
Preceded by Charles Colyear	Earl of Portmore; 1785–1823	Succeeded by Thomas Colyear
