= 105th Regiment of Foot (1794) =

- Active: 18 April 1794–1795
- Country: Kingdom of Great Britain (1756–1800)
- Branch: British Army
- Type: Line infantry

Commanders
- Colonel of the Regiment: Gen Gordon Forbes

The 105th Regiment of Foot had a brief existence as a British Army infantry regiment between 1794 and 1795. Its Regimental Colonel throughout its brief history was Colonel (later General) Gordon Forbes.

The regiment was raised on 18 April 1794 in Leeds, Yorkshire, and posted to Ireland. In 1795 it was to be posted to the Caribbean to take part in a British invasion of Saint-Domingue. The invasion had already suffered heavy losses to yellow fever. On hearing of the plan, soldiers of the regiment rioted. The regiment was disbanded in 1795. Many of the personnel then transferred to other regiments.

== Sources ==
- Perry, James (2005). Arrogant Armies: Great Military Disasters and the Generals Behind Them. Edison: Castle Books.
