= Earl of Portmore =

Title in the Peerage of Scotland

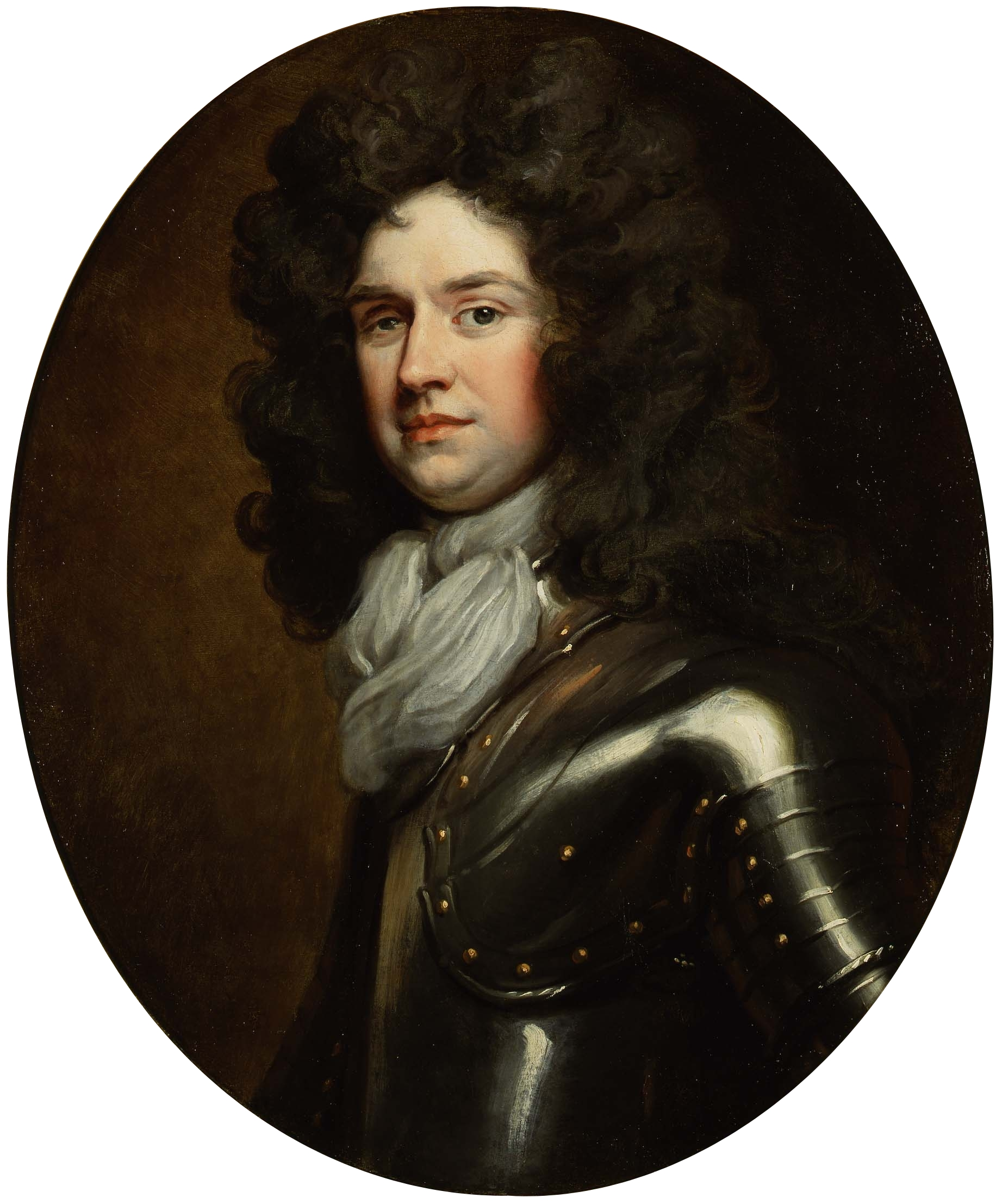
David Colyear, 1st Earl of Portmore.

Earl of Portmore was a title in the Peerage of Scotland. It was created in 1703 for the Scottish military commander David Colyear, 1st Lord Portmore. He had already been created Lord Portmore in 1699 and was made Lord Colyear and Viscount of Milsington at the same time as he was granted the earldom, also in the Peerage of Scotland. He was the son of Alexander Colyear, who had been created a Baronet, of Holland, in the Baronetage of England on 20 February 1677. Lord Portmore married Catherine Sedley, Countess of Dorchester, a former mistress of James II. He was succeeded by his only surviving son, the second Earl. He represented Wycombe and Andover in Parliament. His grandson, the fourth Earl (who succeeded his father), sat as Member of Parliament for Boston. The fourth Earl died without surviving male issue in 1835 when the titles became extinct.

== Colyear Baronets, of Holland (1677) ==
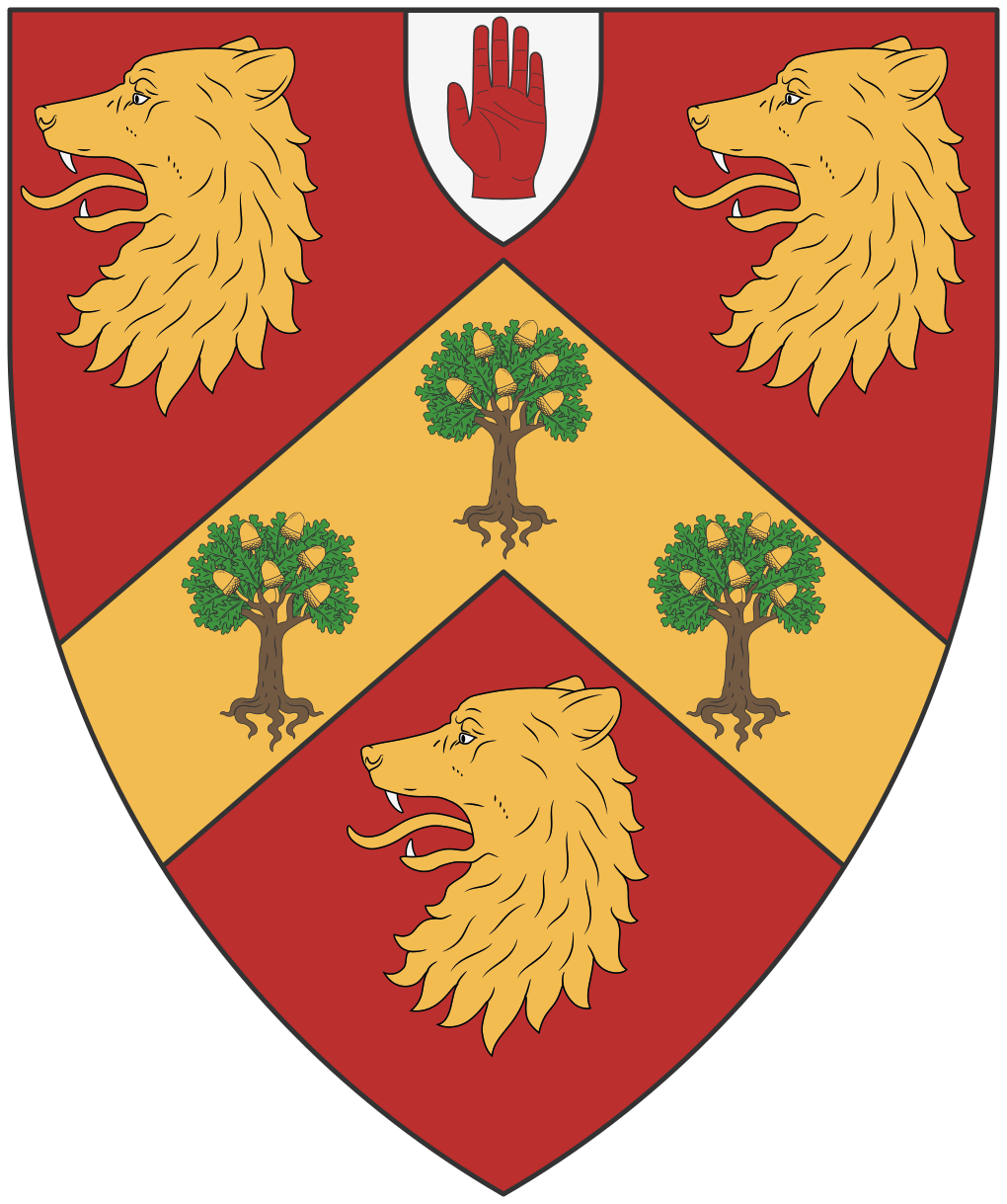
Arms of Robertson, later Colyear of Holland

- Sir Alexander Colyear, 1st Baronet (d. c. 1685)
- Sir David Colyear, 2nd Baronet (c. 1656–1730) (created Lord Portmore in 1699 and Earl of Portmore in 1703)

== Earls of Portmore (1703) ==
- David Colyear, 1st Earl of Portmore (c. 1656–1730)
  - David Colyear, Viscount Milsington (1698–1729)
- Charles Colyear, 2nd Earl of Portmore (1700–1785)
- William Colyear, 3rd Earl of Portmore (1745–1823)
- Thomas Charles Colyear, 4th Earl of Portmore (1772–1835)
  - Hon. Brownlow Charles Colyear (d. 1819)

== Arms ==
Coat of arms of Earl of Portmore
Coronet A Coronet of an Earl Crest A Unicorn rampant Argent armed and maned Or Escutcheon Gules on a Chevron between three Wolves' Heads erased Or as many Oak Trees eradicated proper fructed Or Supporters On either side a Wolf proper Motto Avance
