= Gordon Forbes (British Army officer) =

British Army officer

General Gordon Forbes
- Born: 1738; Aberdeenshire, Scotland
- Died: 17 January 1828 (aged 89–90); Ham, Surrey
- Military career
- Allegiance: Great Britain; United Kingdom
- Branch: British Army
- Rank: General
- Conflicts: American Revolutionary War; French Revolutionary and Napoleonic Wars

General Gordon Forbes (1738 – 17 January 1828) was a senior officer in the British Army.

== Early life ==
He was born the son of Laird Nathaniel Forbes, 1st of Auchernach into the Forbes family of Skellator, Aberdeenshire, Scotland and joined the British Army in 1756 as an ensign in the 33rd Regiment of Foot.

== Military career ==
The following year he was made a lieutenant in the 2nd Battalion, promoted captain in 1762 and fought in the siege of Havana. In 1764 he exchanged to the 34th Regiment of Foot based in North America. He was raised to major of the 9th Regiment of Foot in 1776 and took part in the disastrous 1777 Saratoga campaign into New York colony, where he was twice wounded.

In 1781, promoted to lieutenant-colonel of the newly formed and short-lived 102nd Regiment of Foot, he sailed to the East Indies, where he was given the local rank of colonel. After a brief spell in the 74th Regiment of Foot he became colonel in 1794 of the 105th Regiment of Foot, which however soon disbanded. Promoted to major general in the 81st Regiment of Foot he was in 1795 appointed Governor of Môle-Saint-Nicolas, a French settlement in Saint-Domingue which had surrendered to British forces.

He was appointed colonel of the 81st Foot in 1797, but transferred to the colonelcy of the 29th Regiment of Foot later that year. He was made lieutenant-general in 1801 and full general on 1 January 1812.

== Death and family ==
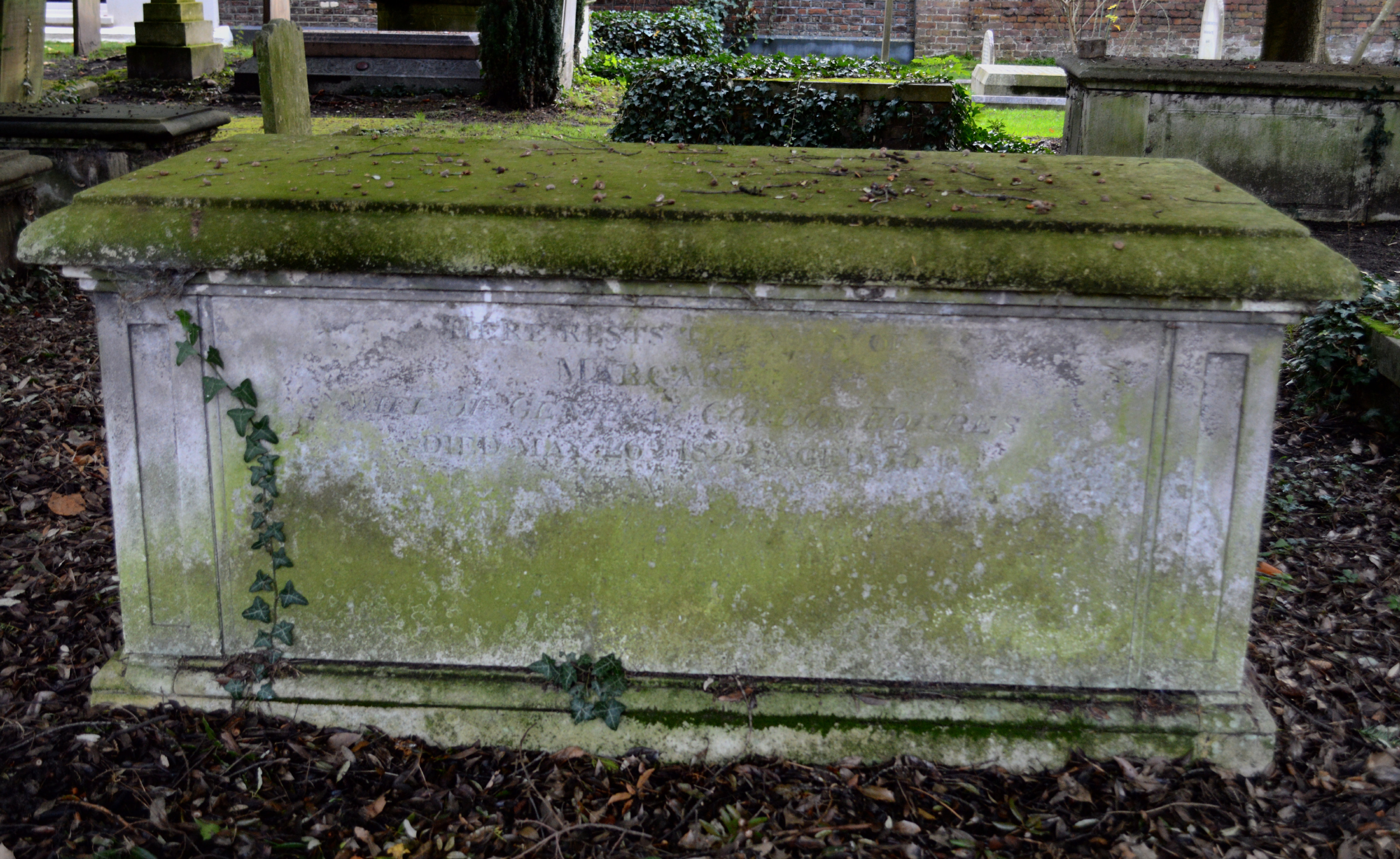
Gordon Forbes' tomb, Petersham

He died on 17 January 1828 in a house later known as Gordon House on Ham Common, London, and was buried nearby at St Peter's Church, Petersham.

He had married Margaret Sullivan of Cork, with whom he had five sons and five daughters. His eldest daughter Isabella married the writer Granville Penn in 1791 at All Saints Church, Kingston upon Thames. Another daughter, Maria, married in 1814 James Dawkins MP, a member of the Dawkins family which owned plantations and slaves in Jamaica.

Military offices
Preceded by William Cathcart, 1st Earl Cathcart	Colonel of the 29th (Worcestershire) Regiment of Foot; 1797–1828	Succeeded by Sir John Byng, 1st Earl of Strafford
Preceded by Chapple Norton	Colonel of the 81st Regiment of Foot; Jan-Aug 1797	Succeeded by Sir Hew Whitefoord Dalrymple
