= John Leslie, 10th Earl of Rothes =

British Army officer (1698–1767)

General The Right Honourable The Earl of Rothes KT
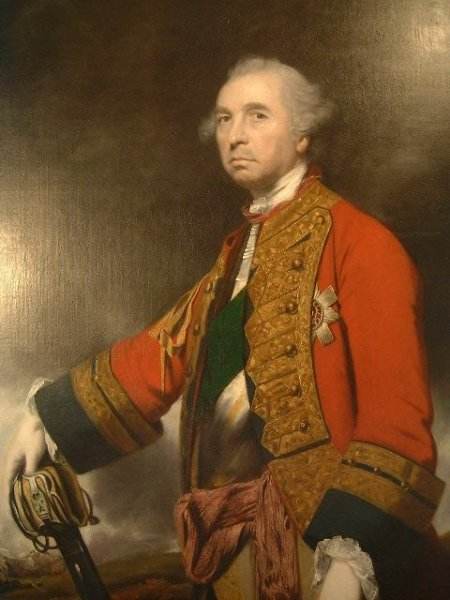
- Portrait by Sir Joshua Reynolds, c. 1753–1767
- Born: 1698
- Died: 10 December 1767 (aged 68–69); Leslie, Fife
- Burial place: Leslie, Fife
- Military career
- Allegiance: Great Britain
- Branch: British Army
- Service years: 1715–1767
- Rank: General
- Units: 9th Dragoons; 3rd Regiment of Foot Guards; Horse Grenadier Guards
- Commands: 21st Regiment of Foot; 25th Regiment of Foot; Commander-in-Chief, Ireland
- Conflicts: War of the Austrian Succession; Battle of Dettingen; Battle of Rocoux
- Awards: Knight of the Thistle

General John Leslie, 10th Earl of Rothes, KT (1698 – 10 December 1767) was a British Army officer who served as Commander-in-Chief, Ireland from 1758 to 1767.

== Military career ==
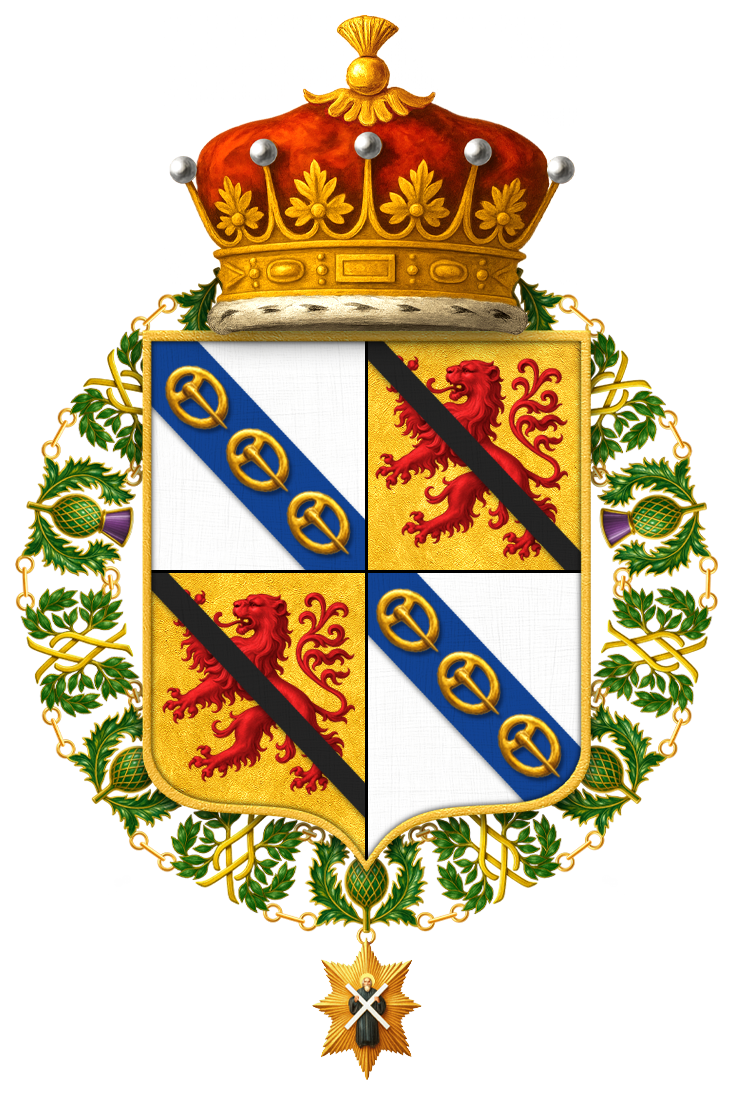
Shield of Arms of Gen. John Leslie, 10th Earl of Rothes, KT, encircled with the collar of the Order of the Thistle

Born the eldest son of John Hamilton-Leslie, 9th Earl of Rothes and Lady Jean Hay, daughter of John Hay, 2nd Marquess of Tweeddale, Leslie was commissioned into Owen Wynne's Regiment of Dragoons, ranked as the 9th Dragoons, in 1715. In 1717 he transferred to the 3rd Regiment of Foot Guards.

He became commanding officer of the 21st Regiment of Foot in 1721 and inherited his father's title the following year. He became a Scottish representative peer in 1723. In 1732 he took over command of the 25th Regiment of Foot. He fought at the Battle of Dettingen on 27 June 1743 and, having transferred to the Horse Grenadier Guards, participated in the Battle of Rocoux on 11 October 1744. In 1751 he transferred to the military staff in Ireland and in 1758 became Commander-in-Chief, Ireland. His home, Leslie House in the village of Leslie, was seriously damaged by fire in 1763. He died at his home in 1767.

In 1747, under the Heritable Jurisdictions Act, he sold the office of Sheriff of Fife, which had been a hereditary right of the earldom since 1540.

== Family ==
In 1741 he married Hannah Howard, daughter of Matthew Cole of Thorpe, Norfolk and his wife Brittania Cole; they went on to have two sons and two daughters, including John Leslie, 11th Earl of Rothes and Jane Elizabeth Leslie, 12th Countess of Rothes, who succeeded to her brother's title, defeating the rival claim of her uncle Andrew. Mary, the youngest daughter, married William Colyear, 3rd Earl of Portmore.

In 1763, following the death of his first wife, he married Mary Lloyd, daughter of Gresham Lloyd and Mary Holt, who after Lloyd's death remarried Thomas Hamilton, 7th Earl of Haddington, a close relative of Rothes.

Military offices
Preceded by John Middleton	Colonel of the Earl of Rothes' Regiment of Foot; 1732–1745	Succeeded by The Lord Sempill
Preceded by The Lord Tyrawley	Captain and Colonel of the 2nd Troop Horse Grenadier Guards; 1745	Succeeded by The Earl of Harrington
Preceded by The Earl of Stair	Colonel of The Earl of Rothes' Regiment of Dragoons; 1745–1750	Succeeded by Hon. James Cholmondeley
Preceded by The Earl of Crawford	Colonel of the Royal Regiment of North British Dragoons; 1750–1752	Succeeded by John Campbell
Preceded by Gervais Parker	Governor of Duncannon; 1751–1767	Succeeded by Lord Robert Bertie
Preceded by The Earl of Dunmore	Colonel of the 3rd Regiment of Foot Guards; 1752–1767	Succeeded by The Duke of Gloucester
Preceded by Viscount Molesworth	Commander-in-Chief, Ireland; 1758–1767	Unknown
Peerage of Scotland
Preceded by John Hamilton-Leslie	Earl of Rothes; 1722–1767	Succeeded by John Leslie
