= Thomas Osborne, 4th Duke of Leeds =

British peer, politician & judge (1713-1789)

The Duke of Leeds KG PC DL FRS
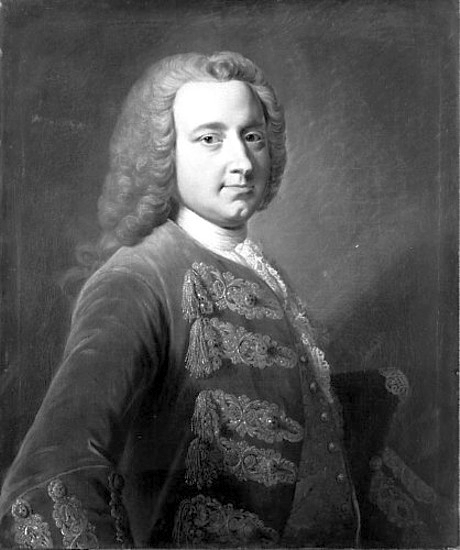
- The Duke of Leeds, c. 1740s

Personal details
- Born: 6 November 1713
- Died: 23 March 1789 (aged 75)
- Spouse: Lady Mary Godolphin
- Children: Francis Osborne, 5th Duke of Leeds
- Parents: Peregrine Osborne, 3rd Duke of Leeds (father); Lady Elizabeth Harley (mother)

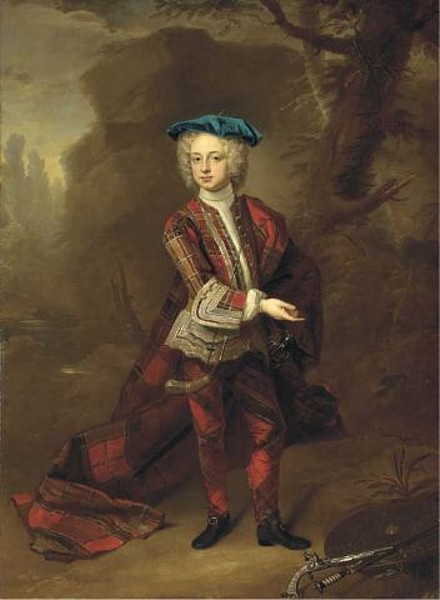
The Duke of Leeds as a child, in Highland costume, with a targe, a sword and a pistol beside him, in a landscape, oil on canvas, by Hans Hausing, 1726

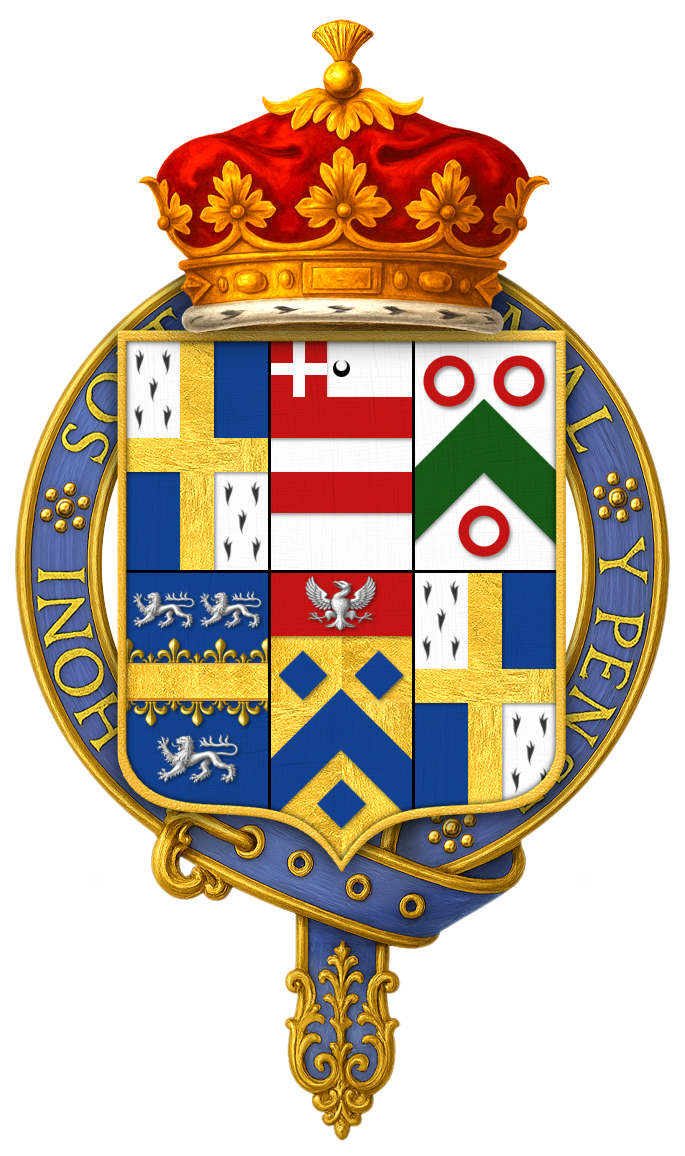
Quartered coat of arms of Thomas Osborne, 4th Duke of Leeds, KG

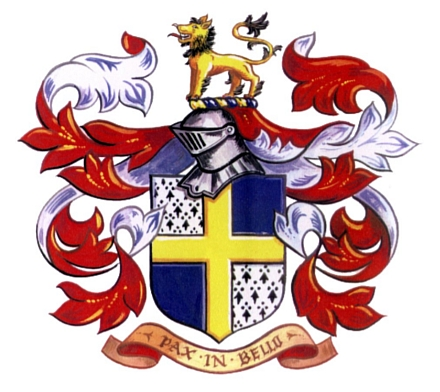
Ancestral arms of the Osborne family, Dukes of Leeds

Thomas Osborne, 4th Duke of Leeds, KG, PC, DL, FRS (6 November 1713 – 23 March 1789), styled Earl of Danby from birth until 1729 and subsequently Marquess of Carmarthen until 1731, was a British peer, politician and judge.

== Background ==
He was the older and only surviving son of Peregrine Osborne, 3rd Duke of Leeds and his first wife Elizabeth, youngest daughter of Robert Harley, 1st Earl of Oxford and Earl Mortimer. Osborne was educated at Westminster School and then Christ Church, Oxford, where he matriculated in 1731. In the same year, he succeeded his father as duke. Osborne received a Doctorate of Civil Law in 1738 and became a Fellow of the Royal Society a year later.

== Career ==
Osborne became a Lord of the Bedchamber in 1748 and was appointed Justice in Eyre south of Trent in November of the same year. In June 1749, he was made a Knight of the Order of the Garter and in 1756, resigning from his post as justice, was nominated Cofferer of the Household. He was sworn of the Privy Council of Great Britain a year later and became Justice in Eyre north of Trent in 1761, an office he held until 1774. Osborne was a Deputy Lieutenant of the West Riding of the County of Yorkshire.

== Family ==
On 26 June 1740, he married Lady Mary Godolphin, second daughter of Francis Godolphin, 2nd Earl of Godolphin and his wife Henrietta Godolphin (née Churchill), 2nd Duchess of Marlborough, and had by her three sons and a daughter. Osborne died 23 March 1789, aged 73, at St James's Square and was buried in the Osborne family chapel at All Hallows Church, Harthill, South Yorkshire. He was succeeded in his titles by his third and only surviving son Francis.

Among his children were:

- Harriot Osborne (13 November 1744 – 14/15 November 1744);
- Thomas Osborne, Marquess of Carmarthen (b. 5 October 1747);
- Francis Godolphin Osborne, 5th Duke of Leeds (29 January 1751 – 31 January 1799);

Legal offices
Preceded by The Earl of Halifax	Justice in Eyre south of Trent; 1748–1756	Succeeded by The Lord Sandys
Preceded by The Lord Sandys	Justice in Eyre north of Trent; 1761–1774	Succeeded by The Lord Pelham of Stanmer
Political offices
Preceded by Sir George Lyttelton, Bt	Cofferer of the Household; 1756–1761	Succeeded by James Grenville
Peerage of England
Preceded by Peregrine Osborne	Duke of Leeds; 1731–1789	Succeeded by Francis Osborne
Preceded by Peregrine Osborne	Baron Osborne (descended by acceleration); 1731–1776	Succeeded by Francis Osborne
