= Catherine Sedley, Countess of Dorchester =

British royal mistress (1657–1717)

The Right Honourable The Countess of Dorchester The Countess of Portmore
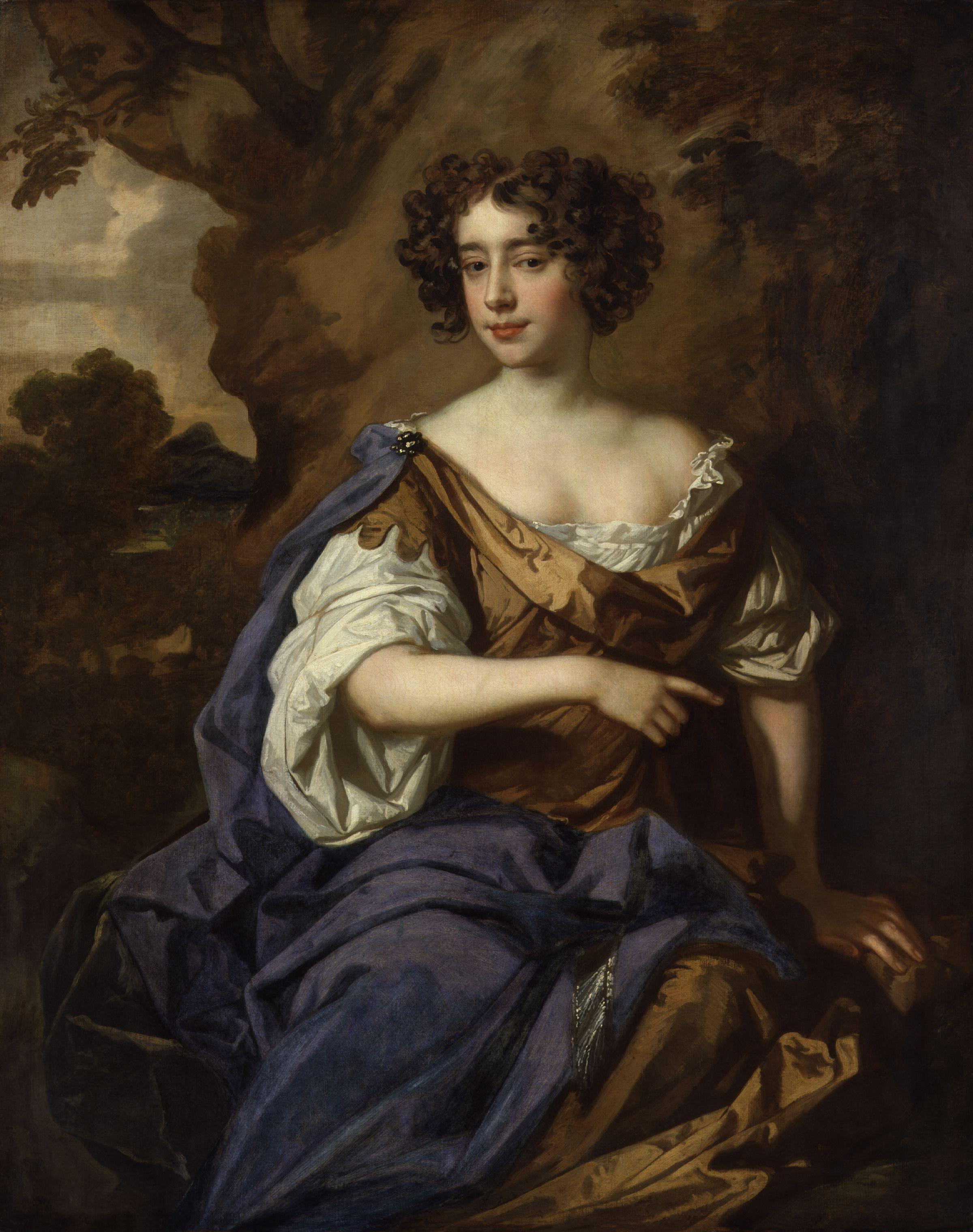
- The Countess of Dorchester, painted by Sir Peter Lely, c. 1675.
- Known for: Mistress of James II of England
- Born: 21 December 1657
- Died: 26 October 1717 (aged 59); Bath, England
- Buried: Church of St James, Weybridge
- Spouse: David Colyear, 1st Earl of Portmore
- Issue: David Colyear, Viscount Milsington; Charles Colyear, 2nd Earl of Portmore; Catherine Sheffield, Duchess of Buckingham and Normanby; James Darnley
- Father: Sir Charles Sedley, 5th Baronet
- Mother: Lady Catherine Savage

Catherine Colyear, suo jure Countess of Dorchester and Countess of Portmore (née Sedley; 21 December 1657 – 26 October 1717), was an English noble and courtier. She was the mistress of King James II of England both before and after he came to the throne. Catherine was noted not for beauty but for her celebrated wittiness and sharp tongue.

== Early life ==
Catherine was the only legitimate child of the Restoration poet Sir Charles Sedley, 5th Bt. Her mother was Lady Catherine Savage, daughter of John Savage, 2nd Earl Rivers. She grew up "notoriously plain" (being brunette and thin rather than plump and fair). While her father roistered around the country, her mother spiralled into insanity until she entered a psychiatric hospital in Ghent during Catherine's early teens. At this low point in her life, Sir Charles introduced a common-law wife, Anne Ayscough, into the family and ejected his daughter from the house.

== Royal mistress ==
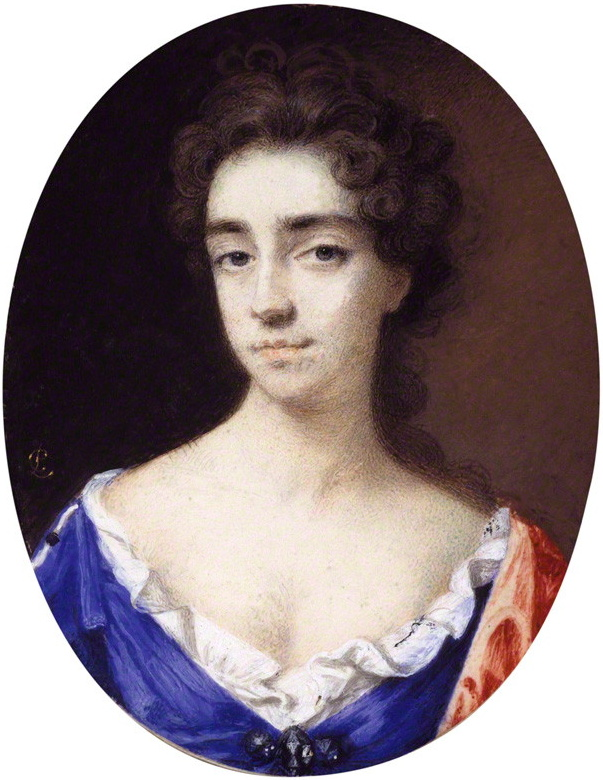
Catherine Sedley (c. 1685)

She worked for Mary of Modena, who had just married James, Duke of York, heir presumptive to the thrones of England, Scotland, and Ireland. This eventually led to an affair with him. She was bewildered at having been chosen by James. "It cannot be my beauty for he must see I have none," she remarked incredulously. "And it cannot be my wit, for he has not enough to know that I have any." James in fact was often attracted to women like Catherine and Arabella Churchill who were generally considered plain, if not ugly; his brother King Charles II once joked that his confessor must impose these mistresses on him as a penance.

After his accession, James yielded to pressure from his confessor Fr. Bonaventure Giffard, backed by the 2nd Earl of Sunderland and several Catholic councillors, and put her away for a time. While James by his own account took Giffard's intervention "very kindly, he being a truly religious man" he told his councillors sharply "not to meddle in things that in no way related to them", adding, with a rare touch of humour, that he had not realised that they had all entered the priesthood too.

She was created Countess of Dorchester for life in 1686, an elevation which aroused much indignation and compelled Catherine to reside for a time in Ireland. In 1696 she married Sir David Colyear, 2nd Bt, who was created Earl of Portmore in 1703, and she was thus the mother of Charles Colyear, 2nd Earl of Portmore. After the Glorious Revolution when Queen Mary II refused to receive her at court, Catherine inquired how Mary, who had broken the commandment to honour her father, was in any way better than Catherine, who had broken the commandment against adultery.

At the court of George I she met Charles II's mistress Louise de Kérouaille, Duchess of Portsmouth, and William III's mistress Elizabeth Hamilton, Countess of Orkney, and exclaimed "God! Who would have thought that we three whores should meet here." At George's coronation in 1714 when the Archbishop of Canterbury, Thomas Tenison, ritually asked if the people accepted their new king, Catherine, observing the number of soldiers on duty, asked caustically "Does the old fool think that anyone will say No?"

She died in Bath on 26 October 1717.

By James II, Lady Dorchester had a daughter, Lady Catherine Darnley (died 1743), who married James Annesley, 3rd Earl of Anglesey, and after his death married John Sheffield, 1st Duke of Buckingham and Normanby. Through Catherine Darnley she was the ancestress of the Barons Mulgrave and of the Mitford sisters. Through her son, Charles, Lord Portmore, she was the grandmother of Elizabeth Collier, wife of Dr Erasmus Darwin, the physician, scientist, poet and grandfather of Charles Darwin.

== See also ==
- English royal mistress
