= Mary Osborne, Duchess of Leeds =

British noblewoman (1723–1764)

Her Grace The Duchess of Leeds
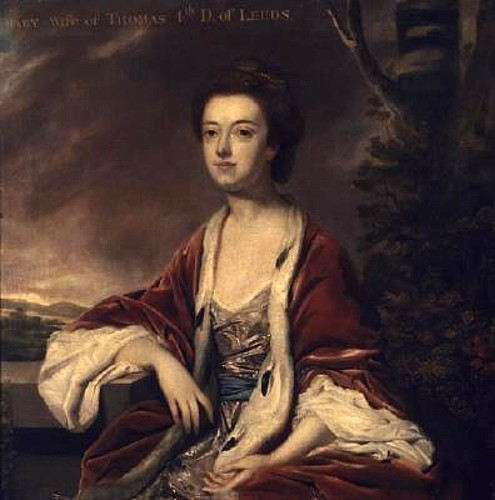
- Portrait by Joshua Reynolds, 1760.
- Born: Lady Mary Godolphin; 23 November 1723
- Died: 3 August 1764 (aged 40)
- Spouse: Thomas Osborne, 4th Duke of Leeds (m. 1740)
- Issue: Francis Osborne, 5th Duke of Leeds
- Parents: Francis Godolphin, 2nd Earl of Godolphin; Henrietta Godolphin, 2nd Duchess of Marlborough

Mary Osborne, Duchess of Leeds (23 November 1723 – 3 August 1764), born Lady Mary Godolphin, was a daughter of Henrietta Godolphin, née Churchill, 2nd Duchess of Marlborough, and Francis Godolphin, 2nd Earl of Godolphin, making her granddaughter to the powerful government trio during the reign of Queen Anne of Great Britain: the famous general and politician John Churchill, 1st Duke of Marlborough, and his wife Sarah, Duchess of Marlborough, through her mother; and Sidney Godolphin, 1st Earl of Godolphin, through her father.

Lady Mary was considered to be the illegitimate child of the famous playwright William Congreve, with whom Henrietta, Duchess of Marlborough, was having a long-term relationship. She was, however, recognised by Francis as his own daughter, and was raised by him with the other Godolphin children. Despite this, gossip spread rapidly about Lady Mary's paternity, and her maternal grandmother did not recognise her until 1740, when the two reconciled their differences. It was at this time that Sarah, Dowager Duchess of Marlborough, arranged Lady Mary's marriage to Thomas Osborne, 4th Duke of Leeds; they were married on 26 June 1740. They had one surviving child, Francis Godolphin Osborne (styled Marquess of Carmarthen, later 5th Duke of Leeds and Secretary of State for Foreign Affairs), who was born on 29 January 1751.

Mary, Duchess of Leeds, died in 1764, aged 40.
