= Lord Leslie =

Lordship in the Baronage of Scotland

Lord Leslie Lordship in the Baronage of Scotland
- Creation date: 1382
- Creation: Baronage of Scotland
- Created by: Robert III of Scotland
- First holder: George Leslie, 1st Earl of Rothes
- Remainder to: heirs and assignees
- Subsidiary titles: Baron of Leslie
- Status: extant
- Seat: Leslie House
- historically connected to the Earldom of Rothes (peerage and baronage titles)

Lord Leslie (Fife) is a title of nobility in the Baronage of Scotland, connected to the county of Fife. It was crown chartered in 1932, and its seat is Leslie House.

== History of the Lordship of Leslie (Fife) ==
The actual earliest mention of the Barony is found in a charter by Robert II of 1382. King Robert III in 1398 granted a further charter to Sir George Leslie of the Barony of Fythkill on the provision that his heirs should render to the King or his successors ‘a pair of white gloves at the Market Cross of Cupar every Whitsunday’. Shortly after, the Barony of Fythkill was renamed, as in 1455 a charter related to Sir George's heir Norman refers to ‘the Barony of Leslie in the County of Fife’. In 1458 the town of Leslie Green was erected into a free burgh of the Barony. Norman was succeeded by his grandson George Leslie in 1489, who received a Crown charter of the barony of Fythkill ‘now called Leslie’ in 1510.

In 1542 the Barony of Leslie was defined as ‘the lands of Pitgeddie, Ballingall, Formanhills, Hoill, Drummane, Strathenrie, Basillie, Pitcairn, Uchtermarnie, Blackhall, Awdy, Lalethin, Drummard, and Kennoquhy.’ The title was later confirmed in a 1606 charter under the Great Seal of Scotland, describing it as 'the Lordship and Barony of Leslie with the palace.

After the Restoration of the Monarchy in 1660, the original Leslie Castle was incorporated into a new mansion known as Leslie House designed by William Bruce. During the Jacobite Rising of 1715 the Leslie family supported the Hanoverian government and commanded a cavalry unit at the Battle of Sheriffmuir. This support resulted in Leslie House being looted by the rebels.

In 1731 William Adam was commissioned to landscape the gardens around Leslie House, which had once impressed Daniel Defoe, who wrote in 1720 that it "[...] is the glory of the place, and indeed the whole province of Fife." After Leslie House was destroyed in a fire in 1763, it was rebuilt as a three-storey classical mansion between 1765 and 1767, with later modifications by Sir Robert Lorimer.

In 1819 George William Gwyther Evelyn inherited the Barony and Lordship of Leslie. His heir George William Evelyn died unmarried and was succeeded by his sister Henrietta Anderson-Morshead in 1859, who conveyed the lands and barony to trustees in 1873. The trustees sold the barony to Captain William Crundall in 1919, and it was purchased in turn by Sir Robert Spencer Nairn 1920. Nairn donated Leslie House to the Church of Scotland in 1952, while retaining other parts of the feudal lands, including all the titles. In 2004, the title was sold to Canadian philanthropist Sir Philip Christopher Ondaatje.

Leslie House was run as a care home by the Church of Scotland from 1952 until 2005, when a fire severely damaged the building; a second fire broke out in 2009. In 2020, plans were announced to restore the building and redevelop it into 28 luxury apartments.

== Family tree ==
Leslie family tree including the Duke of Rothes, Marquesses of Bambreich, Earls of Rothes, and subsidiary titles

Lord Leslie, 1445; Earl of Rothes, 1458
George Leslie c. 1417–1490); 1st Earl of Rothes, etc.
Andrew Leslie styled Master of Rothes
George Leslie d. 1513; 2nd Earl of Rothes, etc.	William Leslie d. 1513; 3rd Earl of Rothes, etc.
George Leslie; 1484–1558; 4th Earl of Rothes, etc.
Norman Leslie d. 1554	Andrew Leslie before 1541–1611; 5th Earl of Rothes, etc.
James Leslie d. 1607 styled Master of Rothes
John Leslie; 1600–1641; 6th Earl of Rothes, etc.
Earl of Leslie and Lord Leslie and Ballinbreich regranted, 1663; Duke of Rothes, Marquess of Bambreich, Viscount of Lugtoun and Lord Auchmotie and Caskieberry, 1680
John Leslie c. 1630–1681; 1st Duke of Rothes, etc., 7th Earl of Rothes, etc.
Dukedom of Rothes, Marquessate of Bambreich, Viscountcy of Lugtoun and Lordship Auchmotie and Caskieberry extinct, 1681
Charles Hamilton; 1650–1685; Earl of Haddington	Margaret Leslie before 1660–1700; 8th Countess of Rothes, etc.
John Hamilton-Leslie; 1679–1722; 9th Earl of Rothes, etc.
John Leslie; 1698–1767; 10th Earl of Rothes, etc.
John Leslie; 1744–1773; 11th Earl of Rothes, etc.	Jane Elizabeth Leslie; 1750–1810; 12th Countess of Rothes, etc.
George William Evelyn-Leslie; 1768–1817; 13th Earl of Rothes, etc.
Henrietta Anne Evelyn-Leslie; 1790–1819; 14th Countess of Rothes, etc.
George William Evelyn Leslie; 1809–1841; 15th Earl of Rothes, etc.	Mary Elizabeth Leslie; 1811–1893; 18th Countess of Rothes, etc.
Henrietta Leslie; 1832–1886; 17th Countess of Rothes, etc.	George William Evelyn Leslie; 1835–1859; 16th Earl of Rothes, etc.	Martin Leslie Leslie; 1839–1882
Norman Evelyn Leslie; 1877–1927; 19th Earl of Rothes, etc.
Malcolm George Dyer-Edwardes Leslie; 1902–1975; 20th Earl of Rothes, etc.
Ian Lionel Malcolm Leslie; 1932–2005; 21st Earl of Rothes, etc.
James Malcolm David Leslie b. 1958; 22nd Earl of Rothes, etc.	Alexander John Leslie b. 1962
Heir presumptive
