= George Leslie =

George Leslie may refer to:

- George Leonidas Leslie (1840–1878), American bank robber
- George Leslie, 1st Earl of Rothes (died 1490), Scottish nobleman and diplomat
- George Leslie, 2nd Earl of Rothes (died 1513), Scottish nobleman
- George Leslie, 4th Earl of Rothes (died 1558), Scottish nobleman and diplomat
- George Leslie, 15th Earl of Rothes (1809–1841), Scottish nobleman
- George Leslie (footballer) (1907–1986), English footballer
- George Leslie (politician) (1936–2023), Senior Vice Chairman of the Scottish National Party
- George Farquhar Leslie (1820–1860), New South Wales politician
- George Cunningham Leslie (1920–1988), Royal Naval officer
- George Dunlop Leslie (1835–1921), English genre painter, author and illustrator
- George Leslie (Upper Canada) (1804–1893), early settler of York, Upper Canada

== Partial name match ==
- George Leslie Mackay (1844–1901), first Presbyterian missionary to northern Formosa (Taiwan)
- George Leslie Drewry (1894–1918), English recipient of the Victoria Cross
- George Leslie Adkin (1888–1964), New Zealand farmer, geologist, archaeologist, ethnologist, photographer, tramper and environmentalist
- George Leslie Cochran (1889–1960), baseball player
