= Lucy Sale-Barker =

British children's writer (1841–1892)

- Born: 1841
- Died: 1892
- Occupation: writer

Lucy Elizabeth Drummond Sale-Barker, née Davies, known also by her first married name Lucy Villiers (1841–1892) was a British children's writer. She began her literary career with occasional articles for Dublin University Magazine and St James's Magazine, and about 1872 began to write regularly for children. Between 1874 and 1888 she published more than forty volumes for juvenile readers. Many of her stories were initially composed for her own children. Some of her publications bore such titles as Little Bright Eyes' Picture Book and Little Golden Locks' Story Book. She edited Little Wide-Awake, a magazine for children, from its commencement in 1874 until her death, and wrote the verses for Kate Greenaway's popular Birthday Book for Children (1880).

== Life ==
Lucy Elizabeth Drummond Davies was a daughter of Francis Henry Davies, a Court of Chancery registrar who died aged 72 at Koblenz on 22 October 1863, and his wife, the author Lady Lucy Clementina Drummond de Melfort (1795–1879), a sister of George Drummond, 5th Earl of Perth (1807–1902), whose claim was admitted in 1848 and who was restored to the peerage in 1853. Lucy had an older brother and sister, of whom little is known.

In 1858 Lucy Davies married Lieutenant-Colonel James Villiers. Their children included a daughter, Clementina, later Mrs Thomas Dyer Edwards. However, Lieutenant-Colonel Villiers died of fever whilst in command of the 74th Highlanders at Ramdroog, India, on 10 May 1862, aged 38. On 10 August 1865 she married John Sale Barker, a barrister-at-law of Cadogan Place, who in 1879 was living at 22 Palace Gardens Terrace, Kensington. Her mother later lived with them and died at their house.

Lucy Sale-Barker died 4 May 1892 at her home, Inglenook, 93 Lennard Road, Penge.

== Works ==
- Lily's home in the country, 1875
- Little wide-awake: a story book for little children, 1876
- Lily's visit to grandmamma, 1876
- Lily's scrap-book, 1877
- Lily's screen, 1877
- Birds, beasts, and fishes, 1886

== Descendants ==
By first husband

- Clementina Georgina Lucy Drummond Villiers (1859 - 3 April 1947 at Painswick, Gloucestershire as Clementina Edwards), married 10 January 1878 at St. Mary Abbots Church, Kensington to Thomas Dyer Edwardes, sometimes called Thomas Dyer-Edwardes, Jr (21 February 1847 – 2 February 1926 at Naples; buried 6 March 1926 at Prinknash Abbey), son and heir of Thomas Dyer Edwardes who died 1885. The couple were cross-channel passengers on the RMS Titanic. Edwards became a Catholic in 1924. Prinknash Abbey was given to the Benedictine order, according to his wishes, by his widow Clementina. They had one child:
  - (Lucy) Noël (Martha) Dyer Edwards (25 December 1878 – 12 September 1956), married 19 April 1900 to Norman Leslie, Earl of Rothes (13 July 1877 – 29 March 1927), and had two children:
    - Malcolm George Dyer-Edwardes Leslie, 20th Earl of Rothes (8 February 1902 – 1975), whose son Ian succeeded him as 21st Earl of Rothes (10 May 1932 – 15 April 2005), and whose grandson James (b. 1958) is the present 22nd Earl of Rothes. The heir presumptive is the Earl's brother Hon. Alexander John Leslie (b. 1962).
    - Hon. John Wayland Leslie (1909–1991).

Noël Leslie, Countess of Rothes, married for the second time on 22 December 1927, to Colonel Claud Macfie, DSO; they had no children. The Countess retained her title after marriage, according to Scottish peerage law.

By second husband (married 10 August 1865)

- Lilian Drummond Sale Barker
- Cecilia Emala A Drummond Sale Barker, who married in the first quarter of 1900.
- (Horace James) Maurice Drummond-Sale-Barker, possibly the same as Horatio Drummond Sale Barker; he was father of:
  - Audrey Durell Drummond-Sale-Barker or "Wendy" Drummond-Sale-Barker (1903 – 21 December 1994), an Olympic skier and a pilot who flew as a ferry pilot of the Air Transport Auxiliary during World War II. She married on 6 August 1949 to George Nigel Douglas-Hamilton, 10th Earl of Selkirk (1905–1994). They had no children.
