= West Milton =

West Milton can refer to:

- West Milton, Dorset
- West Milton, New York
- West Milton, Ohio
- West Milton, Pennsylvania
- West Milton, Vermont
