= List of listed buildings in Leslie, Fife =

This is a list of listed buildings in the parish of Leslie in Fife, Scotland.

== List ==
Name	Location	Date listed	Grid ref. (Note: Sometimes known as OSGB36, the grid reference (where provided) is based on the British national grid reference system used by the Ordnance Survey. • "Guide to National Grid". Ordnance Survey. • "Get-a-map". Ordnance Survey.)	Geo-coordinates	Notes	LB number (Note: Historic Environment Scotland assign a unique alphanumeric identifier to each designated site in Scotland, for listed buildings this always begins with "LB", for example "LB12345".)	Image
37-51 (Odd Nos) Glenwood Road				56°11′49″N 3°12′54″W	Category C(S)	37281	Upload Photo
1-12 (Inc Nos) Greenside				56°12′16″N 3°12′10″W	Category B	37283	Upload Photo
9 High Street				56°12′14″N 3°12′14″W	Category C(S)	37295	Upload Photo
155 High Street With Boundary Walls				56°12′10″N 3°12′36″W	Category C(S)	37301	Upload Photo
242 And 248 High Street With Boundary Wall, Railings And Outbuilding (Former House) To Rear				56°12′09″N 3°12′34″W	Category B	37316	Upload Photo
264 High Street With Boundary Wall				56°12′08″N 3°12′38″W	Category C(S)	37320	Upload Photo
314 And 318 High Street				56°12′06″N 3°12′44″W	Category C(S)	37322	Upload Photo
High Street, St Mary's Rc Church And Church Hall With Boundary Wall, Steps And Piers				56°12′10″N 3°12′37″W	Category B	37328	Upload another image
High Street, Trinity Parish Church With Boundary Walls, Piers And Railings				56°12′01″N 3°12′56″W	Category B	37330	Upload Photo
1-23 (Odd Nos) Prinlaws Road				56°11′58″N 3°13′07″W	Category C(S)	37340	Upload Photo
Balgeddie House Hotel				56°12′41″N 3°11′46″W	Category C(S)	9690	Upload Photo
Leslie House Policies, Duke's Lodge				56°12′16″N 3°11′57″W	Category C(S)	9694	Upload Photo
Prinlaws Stalk				56°11′47″N 3°13′26″W	Category C(S)	37342	Upload Photo
1-7 (Odd Nos) Valley Drive				56°11′55″N 3°13′08″W	Category C(S)	37343	Upload Photo
Greenside, Christ's Kirk On The Green, Kirkyard, Rothes And Douglas Vaults				56°12′20″N 3°12′03″W	Category B	37292	Upload Photo
203 High Street				56°12′07″N 3°12′44″W	Category C(S)	37303	Upload Photo
80 High Street				56°12′12″N 3°12′18″W	Category C(S)	37306	Upload Photo
82-88 (Even Nos) High Street				56°12′12″N 3°12′19″W	Category B	37307	Upload Photo
104 High Street Elmbank House With Boundary Wall				56°12′11″N 3°12′20″W	Category C(S)	37310	Upload Photo
144 High Street With Boundary Wall				56°12′10″N 3°12′25″W	Category C(S)	37313	Upload Photo
222 High Street				56°12′10″N 3°12′31″W	Category C(S)	37315	Upload Photo
High Street, Bingartree House With Gatepiers And Boundary Walls				56°12′02″N 3°12′52″W	Category B	37324	Upload Photo
High Street Old Co-Operative Society Shop				56°12′02″N 3°12′54″W	Category C(S)	37326	Upload Photo
Leslie House Policies, High Street, West Gate, With Boundary Walls				56°12′15″N 3°12′09″W	Category B	37331	Upload another image
Leslie House Policies, High Street, West Lodge				56°12′14″N 3°12′09″W	Category B	37332	Upload another image
Mansfield, Lingarth With Gatepiers And Boundary Walls				56°12′10″N 3°12′56″W	Category B	37333	Upload Photo
Strathendry Castle With Outbuildings, Gatepiers, Gates And Boundary Walls				56°12′13″N 3°15′01″W	Category B	13625	Upload Photo
14 And 15 Greenside				56°12′19″N 3°12′08″W	Category B	37285	Upload Photo
Greenside, Bull Stone				56°12′18″N 3°12′07″W	Category C(S)	37289	Upload another image
Greenside, Greenside House With Stables, Outbuildings And Boundary Walls				56°12′19″N 3°12′02″W	Category B	37290	Upload Photo
11 High Street				56°12′14″N 3°12′15″W	Category C(S)	37296	Upload Photo
22 Iona Park, Gilven House With Gatepiers, Boundary Walls And Railings				56°12′25″N 3°10′34″W	Category C(S)	9692	Upload Photo
Leslie Mains, Mains Lodge With Boundary Wall And Gatepiers				56°12′18″N 3°11′37″W	Category C(S)	6801	Upload Photo
2 Valley Drive With Boundary Wall				56°12′00″N 3°13′00″W	Category C(S)	37344	Upload Photo
13 Greenside				56°12′18″N 3°12′09″W	Category B	37284	Upload Photo
17 Greenside				56°12′19″N 3°12′08″W	Category C(S)	37287	Upload Photo
20 And 21 Greenside				56°12′19″N 3°12′07″W	Category C(S)	37288	Upload Photo
Greenside, Christ's Kirk On The Green, Old Parish Church With Lychgate, Boundary Walls, Graveyard And Monuments				56°12′19″N 3°12′04″W	Category B	37291	Upload another image
15 And 17 High Street				56°12′14″N 3°12′15″W	Category C(S)	37297	Upload Photo
50 And 52 High Street				56°12′13″N 3°12′14″W	Category B	37305	Upload Photo
92 High Street				56°12′12″N 3°12′19″W	Category C(S)	37308	Upload Photo
Mansfield, Wood Gyle With Gatepiers And Boundary Walls				56°12′10″N 3°12′57″W	Category B	37335	Upload Photo
Norman Place, Fettykil House With Walled Garden, Terrace And Boundary Walls				56°12′02″N 3°12′40″W	Category B	37337	Upload Photo
Norman Place, Fettykil Lodge With Boundary Walls				56°12′04″N 3°12′37″W	Category B	37338	Upload Photo
Leslie House With Conservatory, Terraced Garden And Boundary Walls				56°12′12″N 3°11′42″W	Category A	9693	Upload another image See more images
Leslie House Policies, Forester's Lodge, Lodge Rise With Gatepiers And Boundary Walls				56°12′20″N 3°11′02″W	Category C(S)	9695	Upload Photo
4 Leslie Mains				56°12′17″N 3°11′31″W	Category C(S)	6799	Upload Photo
Lothrie Burn Bridge				56°12′12″N 3°11′29″W	Category C(S)	6802	Upload Photo
Strathendry South Lodge Boundary Wall And Gatepiers				56°12′02″N 3°14′22″W	Category C(S)	6805	Upload Photo
Greenside, War Memorial				56°12′16″N 3°12′09″W	Category B	37293	Upload another image
101 High Street				56°12′11″N 3°12′28″W	Category C(S)	37300	Upload Photo
258 High Street				56°12′08″N 3°12′37″W	Category C(S)	37318	Upload Photo
322 And 324 High Street And 5 Seath Court				56°12′05″N 3°12′45″W	Category C(S)	37323	Upload Photo
High Street, Royal Bank Of Scotland				56°12′08″N 3°12′40″W	Category C(S)	37327	Upload Photo
Mansfield And Croft Road, Maryfield With Boundary Walls				56°12′12″N 3°13′00″W	Category B	37334	Upload Photo
7 High Street				56°12′14″N 3°12′14″W	Category C(S)	37294	Upload Photo
91 High Street, Former Bank Of Scotland Including Boundary Walls				56°12′12″N 3°12′27″W	Category B	37299	Upload Photo
195 And 197 High Street				56°12′07″N 3°12′42″W	Category C(S)	37302	Upload Photo
256 High Street				56°12′08″N 3°12′37″W	Category C(S)	37317	Upload Photo
260 High Street				56°12′08″N 3°12′38″W	Category C(S)	37319	Upload Photo
Strathendry, North Lodge				56°12′14″N 3°14′35″W	Category C(S)	6804	Upload Photo
Fettykil Mills, Smith Anderson Scotts Mill				56°11′57″N 3°12′40″W	Category C(S)	37280	Upload Photo
Glenwood Road, Fluthers House With Gatepiers And Boundary Walls				56°12′00″N 3°12′48″W	Category C(S)	37282	Upload Photo
16 Greenside				56°12′19″N 3°12′08″W	Category B	37286	Upload Photo
170 High Street With Boundary Wall And Outbuildings (Former Houses) To Rear				56°12′10″N 3°12′25″W	Category B	37314	Upload Photo
270-274 (Even Nos) High Street				56°12′07″N 3°12′40″W	Category C(S)	37321	Upload Photo
High Street, Town Hall				56°12′14″N 3°12′16″W	Category C(S)	37329	Upload Photo
Strathendry Dovecot				56°12′16″N 3°14′57″W	Category B	13626	Upload another image
Leslie House Policies, Gates And Gatepies, Duke's Lodge				56°12′16″N 3°11′57″W	Category B	10776	Upload Photo
5 Leslie Mains, Keepers House				56°12′16″N 3°11′31″W	Category B	6800	Upload Photo
Strathendry House With Boundary Walls, Bee Boles And Railings				56°12′12″N 3°14′53″W	Category B	6803	Upload Photo
Fettykil Mills, Smith Anderson Stalk				56°12′06″N 3°12′29″W	Category B	37279	Upload Photo
71 High Street				56°12′12″N 3°12′23″W	Category B	37298	Upload Photo
205 And 207 High Street, The Auld Hoose				56°12′07″N 3°12′44″W	Category C(S)	37304	Upload Photo
130 High Street With Outbuildings (Former Houses)				56°12′11″N 3°12′23″W	Category B	37311	Upload Photo
High Street Old Anti-Burgher Kirk To The Rear Of 122-126 And 128 High Street				56°12′10″N 3°12′22″W	Category C(S)	37312	Upload Photo
High Street, Greenside Hotel With Archway				56°12′15″N 3°12′12″W	Category C(S)	37325	Upload Photo
10-12 (Inclusive Nos) Murray Place				56°12′10″N 3°12′45″W	Category C(S)	37336	Upload Photo
North Street, Baptist Church With Boundary Walls, Piers And Railings				56°12′10″N 3°12′43″W	Category B	37339	Upload Photo
Prinlaws Road Trinity Church Hall With Piers				56°12′01″N 3°13′03″W	Category C(S)	37341	Upload Photo
Ballingall Farmhouse				56°12′47″N 3°12′41″W	Category C(S)	9691	Upload Photo
Western Avenue Underpass, Untitled (Industry, Past and Present)				56°12′25″N 3°11′02″W	Category C(S)	51793	Upload another image

== Key ==
The scheme for classifying buildings in Scotland is:

- Category A: "buildings of national or international importance, either architectural or historic; or fine, little-altered examples of some particular period, style or building type."
- Category B: "buildings of regional or more than local importance; or major examples of some particular period, style or building type, which may have been altered."
- Category C: "buildings of local importance; lesser examples of any period, style, or building type, as originally constructed or moderately altered; and simple traditional buildings which group well with other listed buildings."

In March 2016 there were 47,288 listed buildings in Scotland. Of these, 8% were Category A, and 50% were Category B, with the remaining 42% being Category C.

== See also ==
- List of listed buildings in Fife
