= Riverside Park, Glenrothes =

Park in Fife, Scotland

Coordinates: 56.201°N 3.184°W

Riverside Park
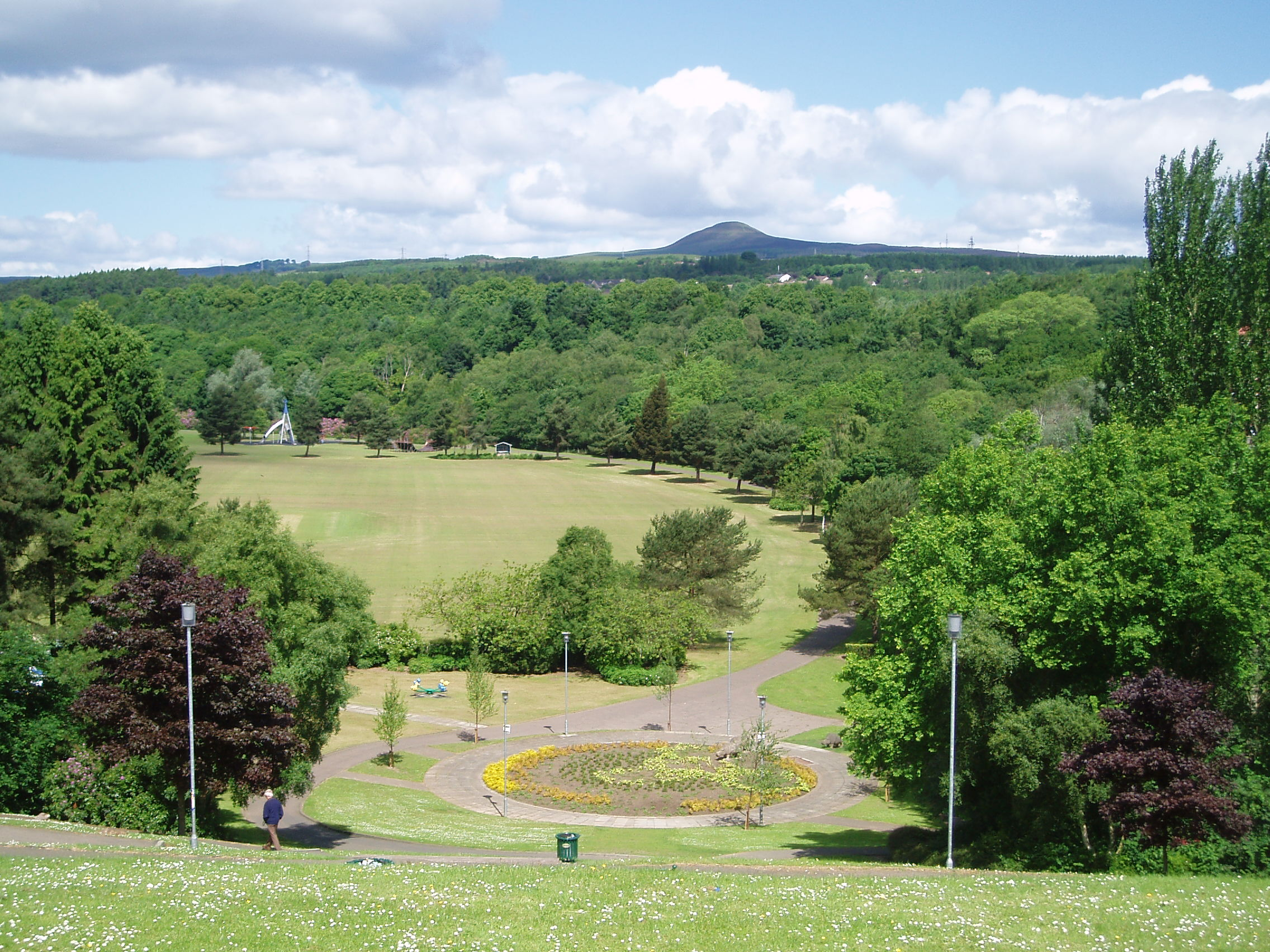
- Interactive map of Riverside Park
- Type: Town Park
- Location: Glenrothes, Fife
- Created: 20th century (current park)
- Founder: Norman Leslie, 19th Earl of Rothes
- Owner: Previously the Earl of Rothes
- Facilities: Pond Dipping Lake *Play Park *Climbing Park *Historic Walk *Leslie House (closed)

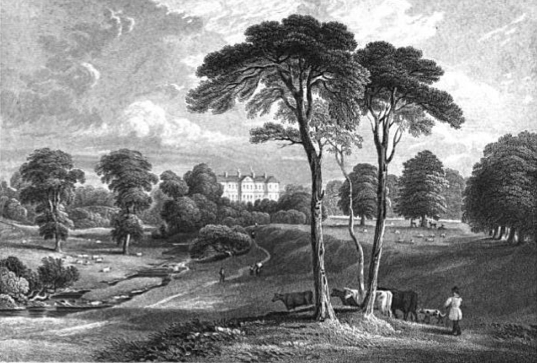
Leslie House, part of the park

Riverside Park is a large town park situated in Glenrothes, Fife. The park straddles the River Leven valley riparian corridor, comprising significant areas of woodland, grassed playing fields and wetlands. The Lothrie Burn flows through the park as a tributary connecting to the River Leven.

Riverside Park has numerous pleasant woodland walks, floral gardens, a pond, community orchard and an arboretum. The park also has several equipped play areas, numerous town art sculptures, adventure play areas, skateboard ramps, seasonal toilets and fitness equipment. Some of the park's town art was gifted to Glenrothes by its twin town Boblingen, Germany.

== History ==
The park previously formed much of the landscaped grounds and gardens associated with Leslie House. This was the former home of the Earl of Rothes, from the time of John Leslie, 1st Duke & 7th Earl of Rothes until the time of Norman Leslie, 19th Earl of Rothes. Leslie House was substantially damaged by fire in 2009, but is currently undergoing restoration and upon completion will once again be a significant landmark in the western portion of Riverside Park.

== Gallery ==
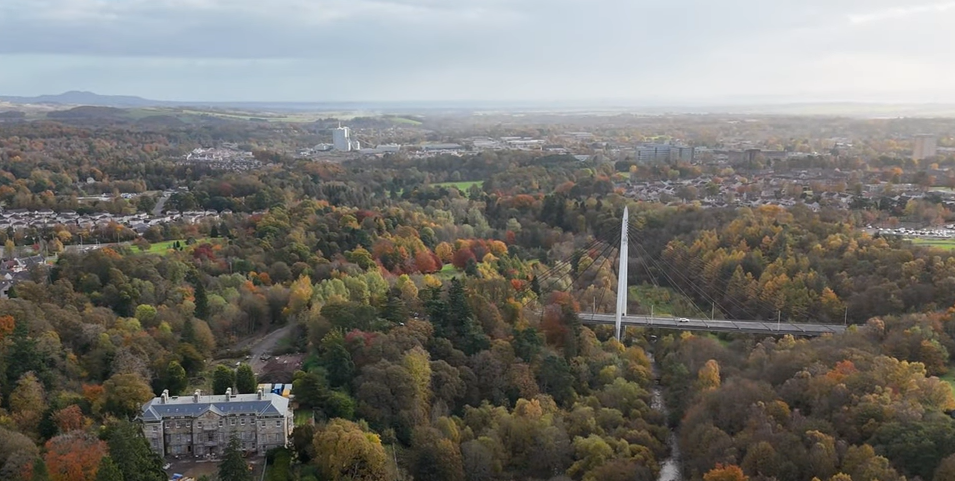
Aerial view over Riverside Park which naturally separates the northern and southern parts of Glenrothes

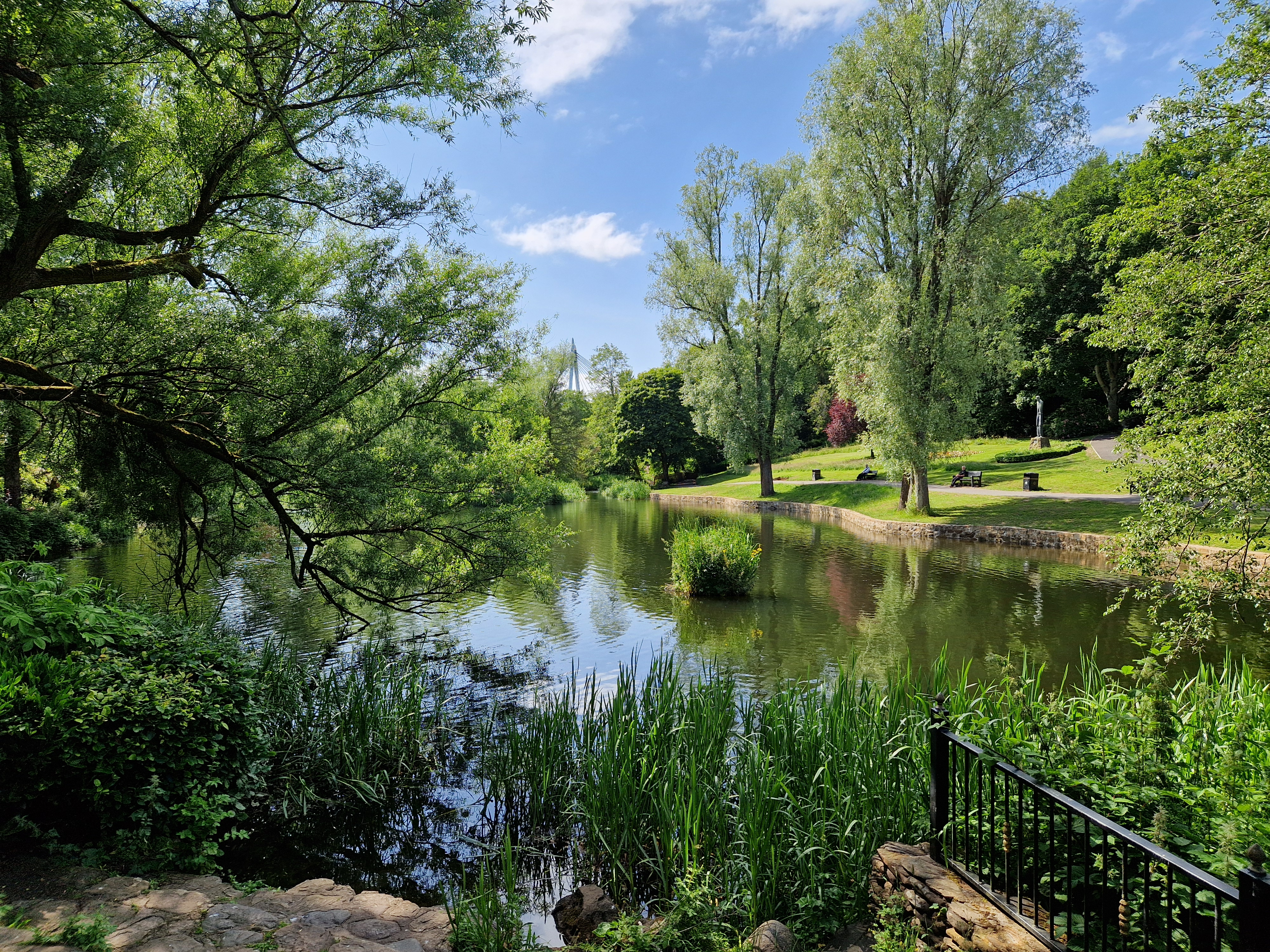
Riverside Park Pond

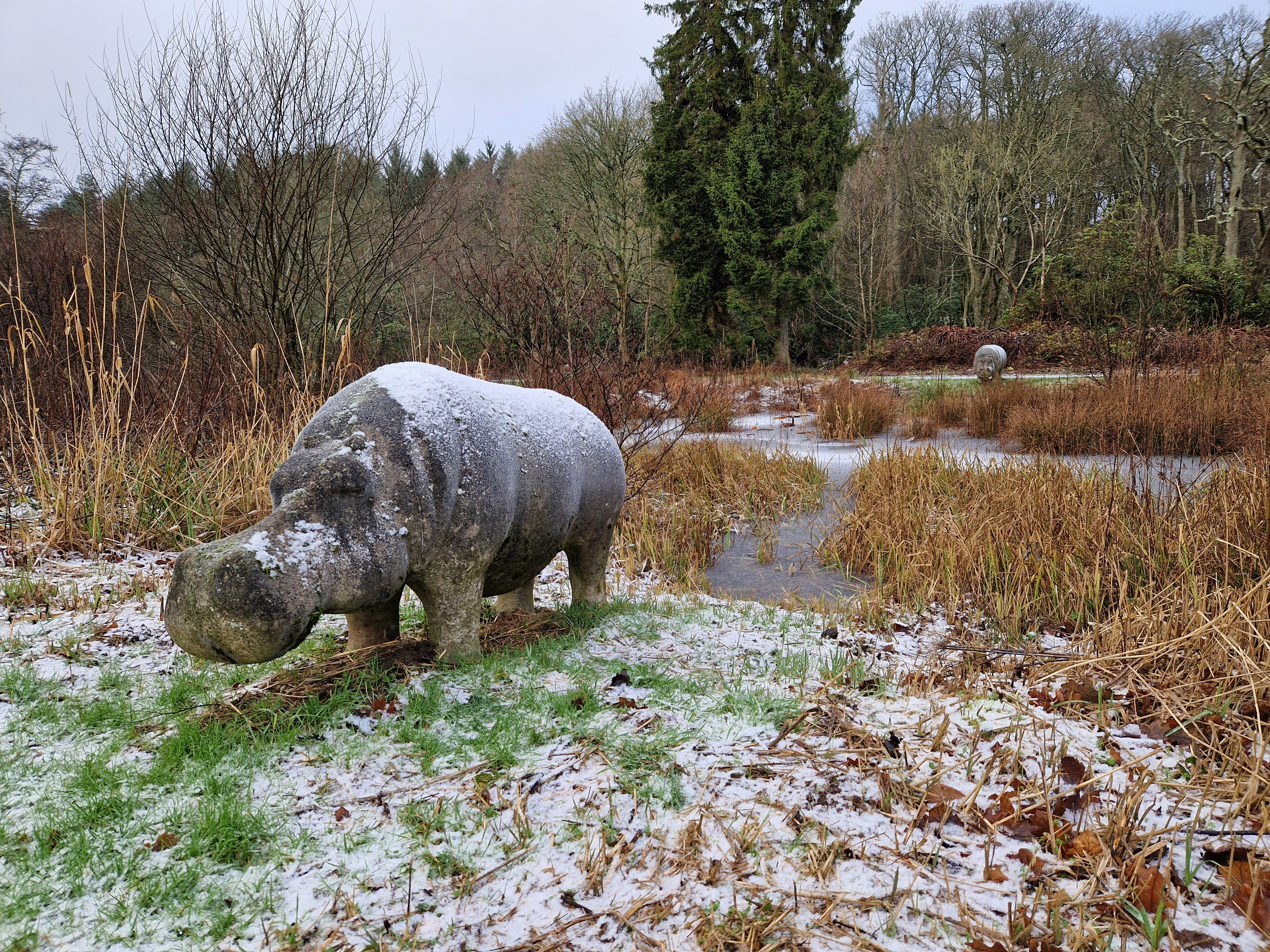
Hippos made from concrete appear at the park

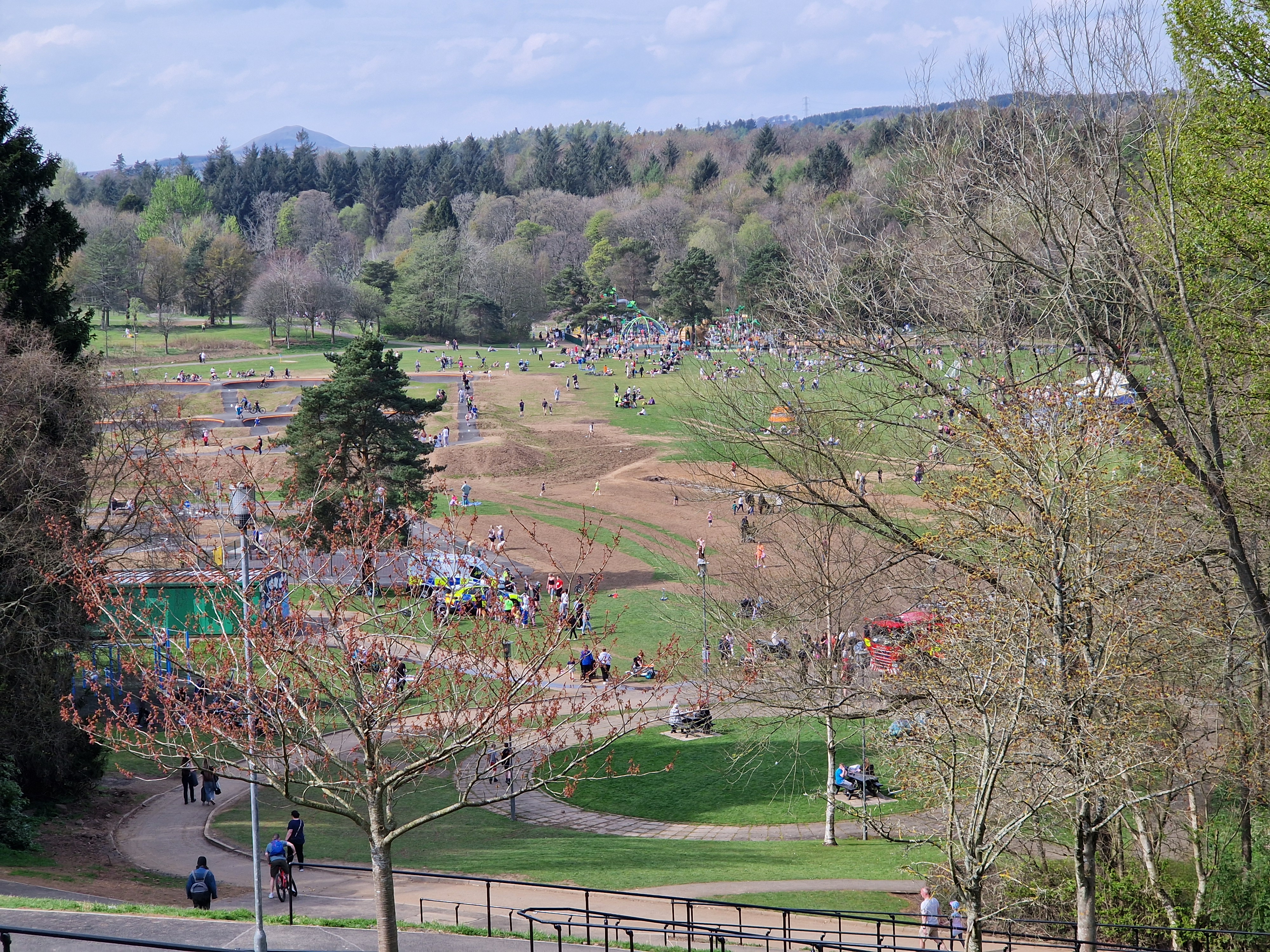
Riverside Park, official opening of the park upgrades, Easter 2025

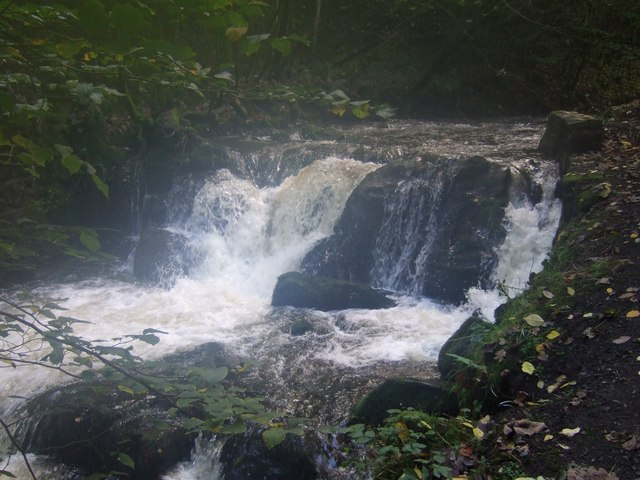
Lothrie Burn waterfall

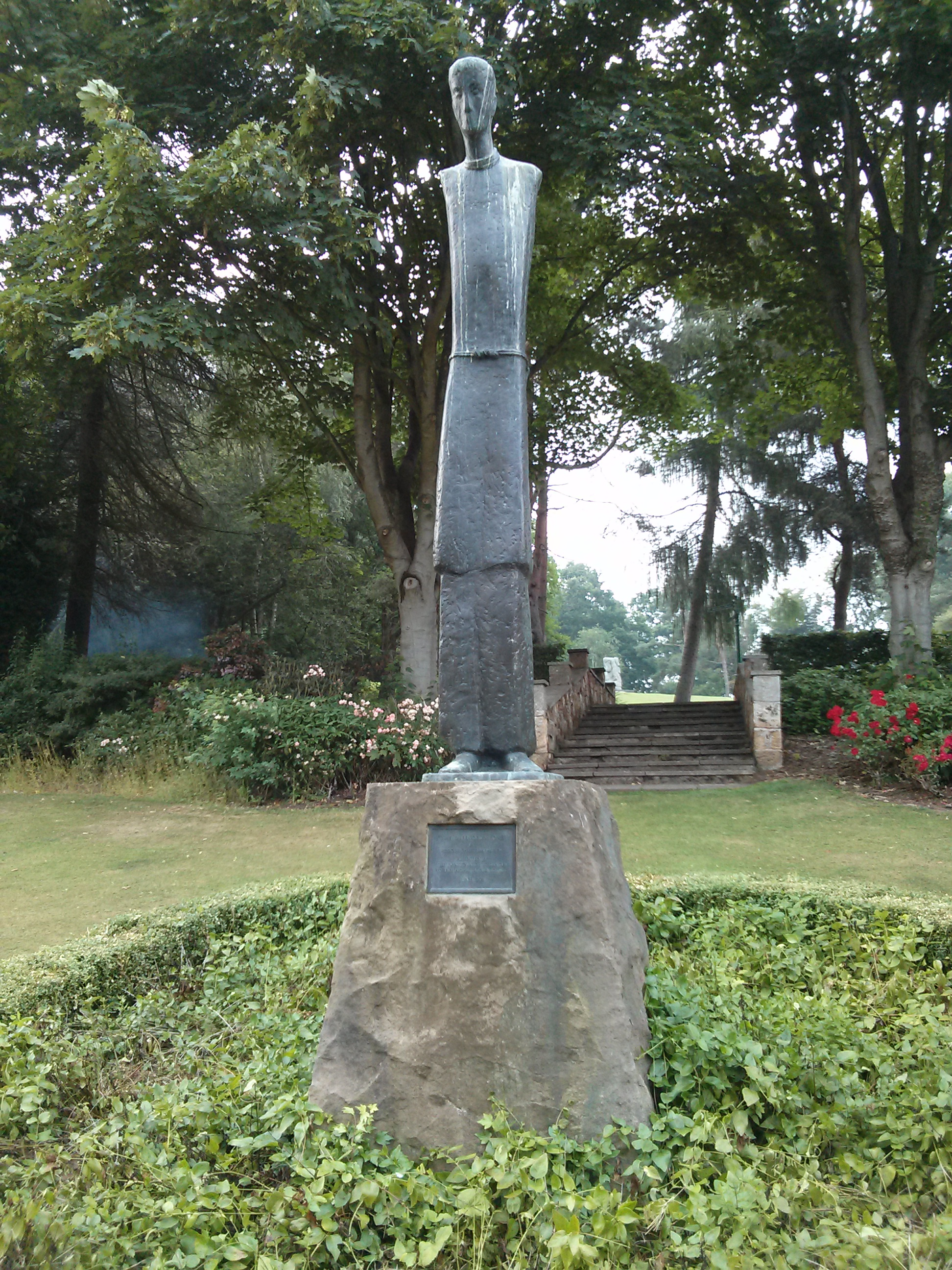
Statue from Boblingen, Germany in the park

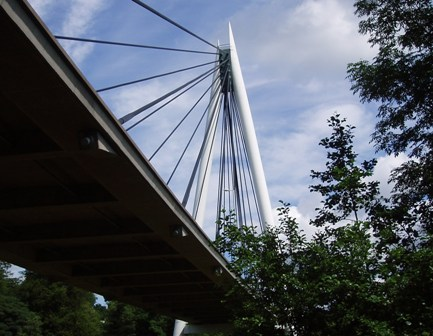
Leven Bridge, crossing over the park and the River Leven

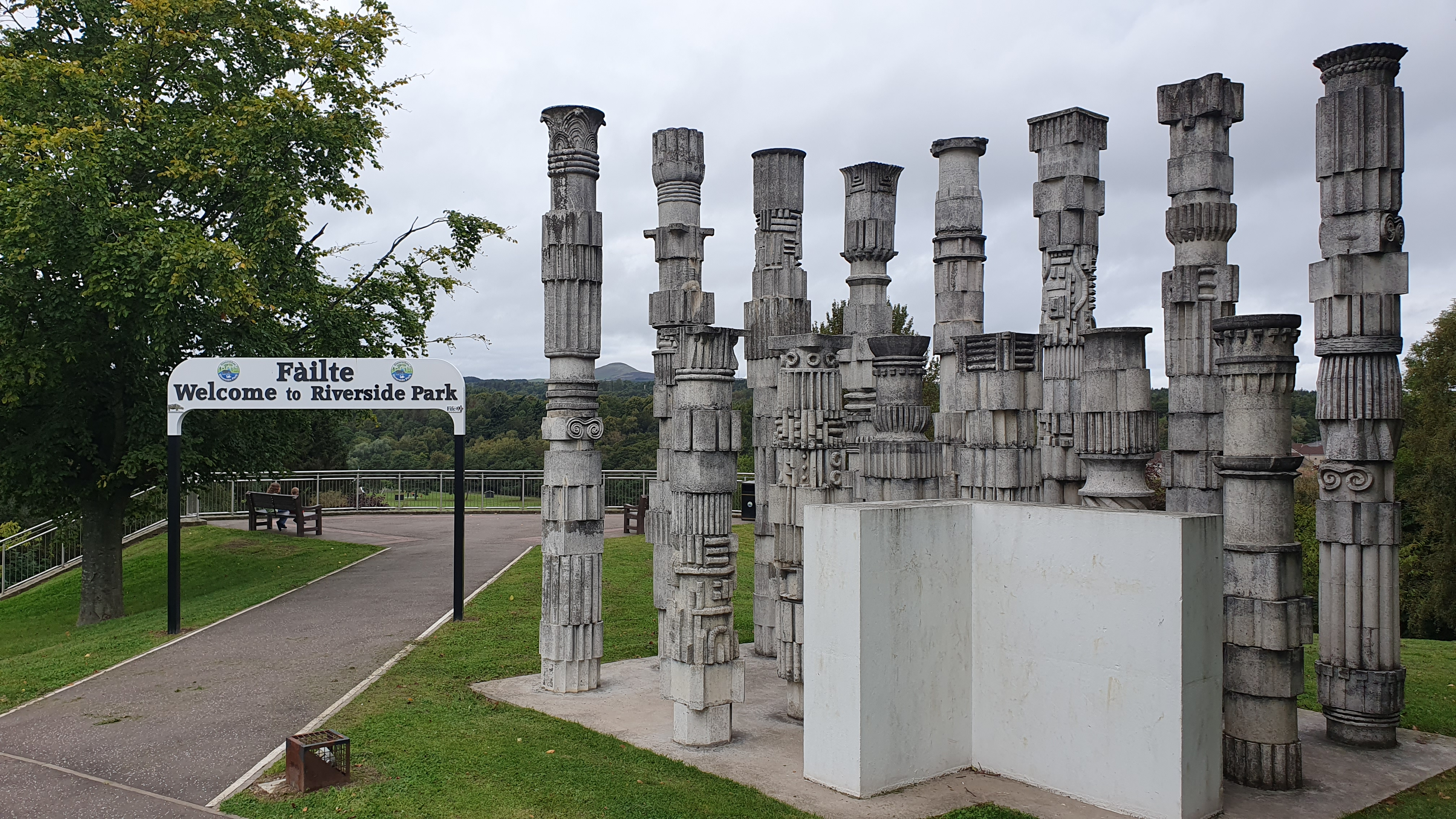
Southeastern entrance to the park from Fullerton Road
