= Leslie, Fife =

Coordinates: 56.20204°N 3.21145°W

Leslie
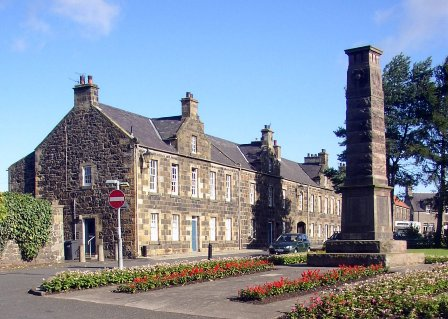
- Leslie War Memorial

- Location within Fife
- Population: 3,010 (2020)
- OS grid reference: NO249017
- Council area: Fife
- Lieutenancy area: Fife
- Country: Scotland
- Sovereign state: United Kingdom
- Post town: GLENROTHES
- Postcode district: KY6
- Dialling code: 01592
- Police: Scotland
- Fire: Scottish
- Ambulance: Scottish
- UK Parliament: Glenrothes
- Scottish Parliament: Mid Fife and Glenrothes

Leslie (Scottish Gaelic: Fiodh Chill) is a large village and parish on the northern tip of the River Leven Valley, to the west of Glenrothes in Fife. According to the population estimates (2006), the village has a population of 3,092. The village was granted burgh of barony status by James II in 1458 for George Leslie who became the first Earl of Rothes. Later, this was upgraded to a police burgh in 1865.

The civil parish has a population of 12,254 (in 2011).

Leslie is a linear settlement with the historic high street as its main focus. A large proportion of housing in Leslie is traditional however there are concentrations of more contemporary housing in the west of the village. The high street contains a number of community facilities including shops, pubs, restaurants and a dentist. Leslie also has a primary school which is located in the west of the village. The former Fettykil paper mill lies within the Leven valley to the south and historic Leslie House, former stately home of the Earls of Rothes, sits in large grounds to the south-east of the village within Riverside Park.

== History ==
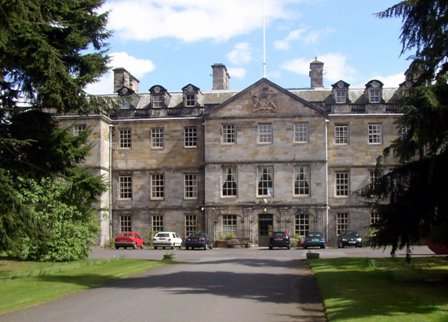
Leslie House

Little is known about the history of Leslie before 1300. The original name of the village was Fiodh Chill, Scottish Gaelic for "Wooden Church". The village currently bears the name of the Leslie family descended from Bartolf or Bartholomew who was a Hungarian or maybe Flemish tradesman, who according to legend arrived in Scotland with Queen Margaret, the sister of Edgar the Ætheling in 1057. Finding favour with Queen Margaret's husband, Malcolm III, Bartolf became the governor of Edinburgh Castle and was knighted and granted with lands in the Garioch in Aberdeenshire, making his residence at Leslie Castle. A charter by William the Lion between 1172 and 1190, granted the lands in Aberdeenshire which were owned by Bartholomew to be passed down to his descendant. In 1283, Norman de Leslie (the fourth descendant of Bartholomew) was granted the lands 'Fettykill' or 'Fythkill' from Alexander III. A settlement also known as 'Fettykill' began to develop around these lands. In 1455, the settlement was renamed '"Leslie"' after Sir George Leslie. Burgh of Barony status followed in 1458 being awarded by James II after Sir George Leslie who became 1st Earl of Rothes (a title which came from the family owning land at Rothes, near Elgin). During this time, the family started to become prominent in Scottish affairs. John Leslie, the then Earl of Rothes, was awarded the title of Lord High Chancellor to Charles II in 1667 and then became known as the Duke of Rothes in 1680. Leslie House was built for the Duke of Rothes between 1667 and 1674 and this became the seat of his heirs, and is still today the seat of the Lordship of Leslie in the Baronage of Scotland.

The main industry was paper making, in the form of what was known as Fettykil Paper Mill, operated by Smith Anderson, which continued into the 21st century. Transport of raw materials was largely by rail, as the factory was rail-linked by the Leslie Railway. Raw materials were brought in and finished product dispatched - even as late as the mid-1960s - by steam-hauled branch goods services.

The town is a key destination on the Fife Pilgrim Way, a historic walking route for pilgrims making their way to St Andrews.

== Sport ==
The village has its own 9-hole golf course and a public park to the north. Leslie Hearts play in the Kingdom of Fife Amateur Football Association's Championship, based at Quarry Park.

== Notable people ==
- Category:People from Leslie, Fife

== See also ==
Other villages on peripheries of Glenrothes:

- Coaltown of Balgonie (east)
- Kinglassie (south-west)
- Markinch (north-east)
- Thornton (south)
