= Noël Leslie, Countess of Rothes =

British philanthropist and social leader

The Right Honourable The Countess of Rothes
- Born: Lucy Noël Martha Dyer-Edwardes; 25 December 1878; Kensington, London, England
- Died: 12 September 1956 (aged 77); Hove, Sussex, England
- Resting place: Christ's Kirk on the Green Churchyard, Leslie, Fife, Scotland
- Occupations: Socialite, philanthropist, social leader
- Spouses: Norman Leslie, 19th Earl of Rothes (m. 1900; died 1927) Colonel Claud Macfie (m. 1927)
- Children: 2, including Malcolm Leslie, 20th Earl of Rothes

Lucy Noël Martha Leslie, Countess of Rothes (née Dyer-Edwardes; 25 December 1878 – 12 September 1956) was a British philanthropist and social leader. She was seen as a heroine of the Titanic disaster, famous for taking the tiller of her lifeboat and later helping row the craft to the safety of the rescue ship Carpathia.

The countess was for many years a popular figure in London society, known for her blonde beauty, bright personality, graceful dancing and diligence in helping organise lavish entertainments patronised by British royalty and members of the nobility. She was long involved in charity work throughout the United Kingdom, most notably assisting the Red Cross with fundraising and as a nurse for the Coulter Hospital in London during the First World War. Lady Rothes was also a leading benefactor of the Queen Victoria School and The Chelsea Hospital for Women, known today as Queen Charlotte's and Chelsea Hospital.

== Childhood and married life ==
Born in her parents' townhouse in Kensington, London, on Christmas Day 1878, she was the only child of Thomas and Clementina Dyer-Edwardes. Her maternal grandmother was Lucy Sale-Barker. She was brought up at her parents' residences, Prinknash Park in Gloucestershire and Chateau de Retival in Normandy and a townhouse in Kensington, London.

Noël Dyer-Edwardes married Norman Leslie, 19th Earl of Rothes on Primrose Day, 19 April 1900 at St Mary Abbots in Kensington, London. Although wedding announcements in The Sketch and other London papers spelled the bride's name "Noëlle," and she periodically adopted this spelling herself, the family today prefers "Noël," as it appears on her birth certificate.

The Countess's husband held one of the oldest peerages in the United Kingdom, dating to before 1457, and was elected a Scottish representative peer, a position he held between 1906 and 1923. The Leslie family earldom was also one of the few which recognized the right of descent through female heirs. The Clan Leslie motto is "Grip Fast." Lord Rothes was a captain in the Fife Royal Garrison Artillery Militia, a lieutenant in the Royal Highland Regiment, known as the Black Watch, and a lieutenant-colonel in the Highland Cyclist Battalion.

The Leslies resided in England until 1904 when they took possession of the 10,000-acre family seat in Scotland, Leslie House in Leslie, Fife. Although the couple kept homes in England, including a townhouse in Chelsea, London, they lived most of each year at their Scottish estate. The earl and countess shared a wide range of sporting interests, from hunting to cricket, and were active socially, attending royal and other social functions. They were frequently mentioned in the daily press, and Noël Rothes, in particular, was often photographed in the illustrated weeklies in London.

Lord and Lady Rothes had two children:

- Malcolm George Dyer-Edwardes Leslie, Lord Leslie (later 20th Earl of Rothes) (1902–1975), married Beryl Violet Dugdale, daughter of Captain James Lionel Dugdale and Maud Violet Woodroffe, on 17 July 1926.
- The Honourable John Wayland Leslie (1909–1991).

In 1916, the earl was wounded in action in France during the First World War and recovered at the Coulter Hospital in London. He was promoted to the rank of colonel in 1918.

== Philanthropy, society and politics ==
She became well known for her prolific charitable work in England and Scotland. One of her first projects was helping arrange the Royal Caledonian Ball which annually benefited the Royal Caledonian Schools. The countess was also active for a number of years in fundraising for the Queen Victoria School, the Randolph Wemyss Memorial Hospital and the Chelsea Hospital for Women.

In addition, she served on the organizing or fundraising committees for such agencies as the Princess Mary Scholarship at Cedars College for Blind Girls, the YMCA Bazaar, The Children's Guild, the Deptford Fund and the Village Clubs Association. She also assisted the Duchess of Sutherland in planning costume balls and garden parties in aid of the National Milk Hostels which provided "wholesome milk for poor families." Noël was joined in her charity work by other leading figures in London society, including Lady Londonderry, the Duchess of Devonshire, the Duchess of Marlborough and Lady Juliet Duff.

In 1911 Noël began her long association with the Red Cross, establishing a branch in Leslie and endowing it with three ambulances. This led to a larger ambulance corps serving Fife, called the Countess of Rothes Voluntary Aid Detachment. That year she also underwent training herself as a nurse. Despite her busy work for national charities, Noël remained devoted to the welfare of local citizens. Along with holding village Christmas parties in Leslie, she established a club for young girls employed in Falkland factories, funded a clinic in the parish of Kinglassie, and planned parties for the 2nd Battalion of the Highland Light Infantry.

Noël's success as a patroness of philanthropic causes owed to her energetic personality and organizational skills but also to her popularity as a hostess, her beauty, and her friendships with members of the British royal family and aristocracy, including H.R.H. Princess Louise and the Duchess of Wellington. She was an exceptionally adept dancer and amateur actress which she demonstrated at the entertainments she either hosted or organized for charity. Among these were a 1910 pageant at Falkland Palace, which she not only directed but appeared in; the "Tally Ho!" Ball the following year at Edinburgh's Musical Hall, where she danced in a special quadrille reel named for her; and the Coronation Garden Party later in 1911 at Devonshire House where she performed in a minuet that opened the festivity.

The countess was politically active. Although a Conservative, she supported the women's suffrage cause as a member of the Women's Unionist Association, chairing local chapters of the group at Markinch and in Leslie. She also opposed socialist initiatives and the proposed reform of Irish Home Rule.

Perhaps her finest achievement in service to others was nursing soldiers during the First World War, first at Leslie House, a wing of which she converted into a hospital for troops invalided out of the conflict, and then at the Coulter Hospital in London. There she nursed her own husband after he was wounded in battle in 1916. She found the work fulfilling and stayed on for two years. During her time with the Coulter Hospital, Noël helped produce the Hurlingham Fete, Fair and Sports, benefiting wounded soldiers, in 1918.

== Titanic disaster ==
Noël Rothes is best known as a heroine of the 1912 Titanic tragedy, helping to command her lifeboat, in concert with Able Seaman Thomas William "Tom" Jones. Noël handled the tiller of the boat, steering it clear of the sinking liner, and later assisted in rowing it to the rescue ship, all the while encouraging other survivors with her calm decisiveness and optimism. She embarked at Southampton on 10 April with her parents, Thomas and Clementina Dyer-Edwardes, her husband's cousin Gladys Cherry, and her maid Roberta Maioni. Her parents disembarked at Cherbourg, while the others continued, en route for New York and possibly Vancouver, British Columbia to meet the Earl of Rothes who was already visiting the U.S. and Canada on business. Before the Titanic left Southampton, Noël granted an interview to a London correspondent for The New York Herald in which she explained she was going to the U.S. to join her husband. She admitted they were also personally interested in purchasing an orange grove on the west coast. Asked by the reporter how she felt about "leaving London society for a California fruit farm," Noël replied, "I am full of joyful expectation."

While Noël and Gladys were originally installed in a basic first class cabin, C-37, it is believed they upgraded to a more commodious suite, C-77. In an American press interview, Rothes was quoted as saying she and Cherry occupied stateroom B-77. The women were in their beds when the Titanic collided with an iceberg at 11:40 p.m. on the night of 14 April. The pair was awakened by the crash and went up on deck to investigate. They were instructed by Captain E.J. Smith, the Titanic's commander, to return to their cabin and don lifejackets.

Noël, Gladys and Noël's maid were rescued in lifeboat 8, which was lowered at approximately 1:00 a.m., over an hour after the collision. The boat was launched simultaneously with Lifeboat 6 but reached the water first, making it the first lifeboat afloat on the port side of the ship. Tom Jones, the Able Seaman placed in charge of the boat by Captain Smith, later said Rothes "had a lot to say, so I put her to steering the boat," a roundabout compliment to her leadership abilities. She took charge of the tiller, steering for over an hour before asking Gladys to take over while she stopped to comfort a young Spanish newlywed, María Josefa Peñasco y Castellana, whose husband was lost in the sinking. There she remained for the duration of the night, rowing all the while and helping to boost the morale of other women until their lifeboat was picked up by the RMS Carpathia early the next morning.

When the Carpathia was sighted, cheers went up and several in their boat started to sing the Philip Bliss hymn "Pull for the Shore." Afterwards, Noël suggested "Lead, Kindly Light": "Lead, kindly light, amid the encircling gloom/Lead thou me on!/The night is dark, and I'm far from home/Lead thou me on!"

Once aboard the rescue vessel, she devoted herself to the care of steerage women and children from the Titanic. As an account in the London Daily Sketch would record: "Her Ladyship helped to make clothes for the babies and became known amongst the crew as the 'plucky little countess.'" The newspaper added that a stewardess told Noël, "You have made yourself famous by rowing in the boat," to which she replied, "I hope not. I have done nothing."

Noël did not welcome the publicity that proclaimed her a heroine, insisting it was the cool-headed leadership of Seaman Jones and the combined aid of her cousin-in-law and other occupants in the boat that night that deserved praise. As a token of her esteem, she presented Jones with an inscribed silver pocket watch; she also gave one to Steward Alfred Crawford in recognition for his assistance at the oars, rowing "doggedly for five hours." Jones later returned the largesse by gifting her the brass number plate from their lifeboat. Noël wrote to Jones every Christmas, and the two maintained a correspondence until her death. The number plate is now in the possession of the Countess' grandson Alastair Leslie. The family also re-acquired Jones' watch when it was auctioned by his family after his death.

The Royal National Lifeboat Institution’s Fraserburgh Lifeboat, introduced to service in 1915, was christened Lady Rothes. The lifeboat was provided as a gift from Thomas Dyer-Edwardes, the countess' father, in gratitude for his daughter's rescue from the Titanic.

In 1918 an exhibition at the Grafton Galleries in London, benefiting the Red Cross, included a pair of pearls from the 300-year-old heirloom necklace Noël wore when she escaped the Titanic.

== Later life and second marriage ==
After Norman Rothes died on 29 March 1927, Noël remarried on 22 December 1927, to Colonel Claud Macfie, DSO, in the courthouse in Chelsea, London. The countess retained her title. The couple had no children. While Noël and Claud maintained a home in Hove, Sussex, they lived most of the year at the Macfie estate, Fayre Court in Fairford, Gloucestershire.

In her last years Noël was interviewed by author Walter Lord for his account of the Titanic disaster, A Night to Remember, which brought her story to a new generation on its publication in 1955.

Noël, Countess of Rothes died in her home in Hove, Sussex, on 12 September 1956, having suffered for some time from heart disease. She was buried next to her first husband in the Leslie vault at Christ's Kirk on the Green Churchyard in Leslie, Fife. A memorial plaque was erected in her honor on the west wall of the chancel of St Mary's Church in Fairford. It reads: "Noëlle, Widow of the 19th Earl of Rothes, and Beloved Wife of Col. Claud Macfie D.S.O. of Fayre Court, Fairford, At Rest 12 Sept. 1956. Holiness is an infinite compassion for others. Greatness is to take the common things of life and walk truly among them. Happiness is a great love and much serving."

== Legacy ==
- Kate Howard (1979) - S.O.S. Titanic; TV Movie
- Rochelle Rose (1997) - Titanic
- Pandora Colin (2012) - Titanic; TV series
- Daina Griffith (2024) - Unsinkable
