= Moonzie =

Coordinates: 56.345°N 3.062°W

- Location within Fife
- OS grid reference: NO3385617616
- Council area: Fife
- Lieutenancy area: Fife
- Country: Scotland
- Sovereign state: United Kingdom
- Post town: CUPAR
- Postcode district: KY15
- Dialling code: 01337
- Police: Scotland
- Fire: Scottish
- Ambulance: Scottish
- UK Parliament: North East Fife
- Scottish Parliament: North East Fife

Moonzie is a small parish in Fife, Scotland, about 3 miles north-west of Cupar. It is bounded on the west by Creich, on the north by Kilmany, on the south-east by Cupar and on the south-west by Monimail.

== History ==
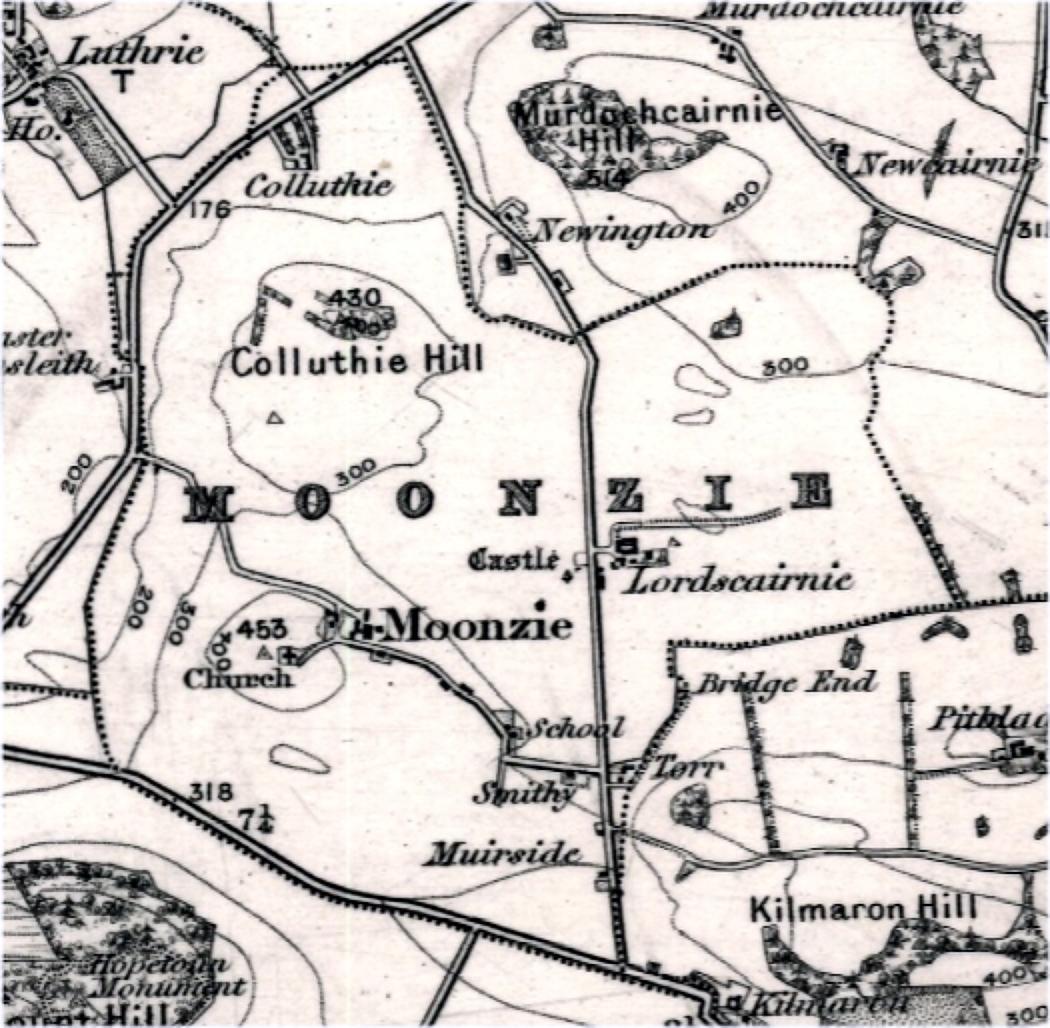
Parish of Moonzie (1908)

Prior to 1238 the parish was called Urhithumonesyn. Afterwards it assumed the name Auchtermonsey. Moonzie, its present name, is generally supposed to be a Gaelic word signifying Hill of the Deer.

Moonzie Church, a simple rectangular building, is of uncertain date, but was renovated in the 18th, and altered in the 19th centuries. It was granted to the hospital of Loch Leven in about 1214 and passed in 1250–1 to the Red Friars of Scotlandwell, who maintained a hospital in Scotlandwell between 1250 and 1587. It was re-dedicated to the Holy Trinity in 1245 but no regular minister was appointed until 1608. In 1564, the parish of Moonzie was united to that of Cupar, but, in 1625, it was disjoined and again made a separate parish, James Wedderburn being admitted as minister. Ministers for the parish of Moonzie continued to be chosen until 1929. After 1929 charge was served by a lay missionary under the supervision of the parish of Creich until 1939, when a modified ministry was granted and then Moonzie was linked with Creich from April 1947. The parish congregation was dissolved on 5 December 1971 rather than be linked with Creich, Flisk and Kilmany

The parish is a Community Council area of Fife, but the council is currently not active.

The civil parish has an area of 1258 acres. From a population of 201 in the year 1801, this declined to 138 in 1901, to 120 in 1931 and is now under 30 (in 2011).

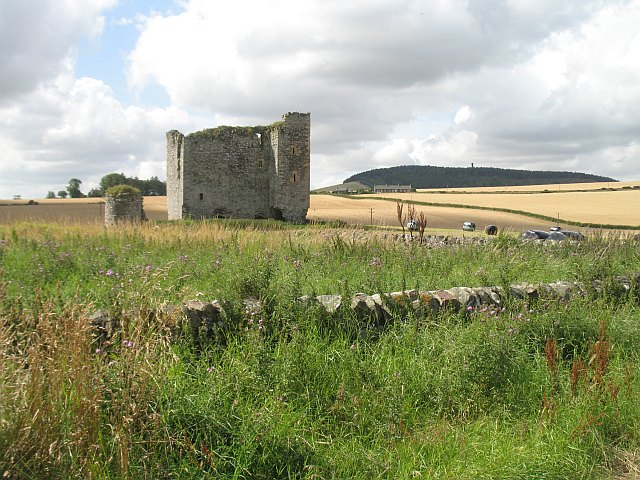
Lordscairnie Castle

Antiquities within the parish include Lordscairnie Castle and Colluthie House, at the foot of Colluthie Hill.

In the estate of Lordscairnie there was formerly a loch or myre nearly two miles long and up to a quarter of a mile wide. In the early 19th century it was drained and converted into arable ground. The only significant watercourse in the parish is Moonzie Burn, which rises from the area of Lordscairnie Myre and after winding its way eastwards through several parishes, flows into the estuary of the River Eden at Guardbridge.
