= Earl of Rothes =

Title in the Peerage of Scotland

Earldom of Rothes
- Blazon Arms: Quarterly 1st and 4th Argent, on a bend azure three buckles or (Leslie) 2nd and 3rd Or, a lion rampant gules over all a ribbon sable (Abernethy)
- Creation date: 1458
- Created by: James II of Scotland
- Peerage: Peerage of Scotland
- First holder: George Leslie, 1st Earl of Rothes
- Present holder: James Leslie, 22nd Earl of Rothes
- Heir presumptive: Hon. Alexander John Leslie
- Subsidiary titles: Lord Leslie
- Status: Extant
- Seat: Littlecroft
- Former seat: Leslie House

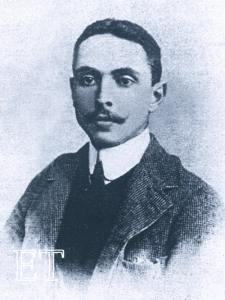
Norman Leslie, 19th Earl of Rothes.

Earl of Rothes (pronounced "Roth-es") is a title in the Peerage of Scotland, first created in 1458 for George Leslie, 1st Lord Leslie. The heir apparent to the earldom uses the courtesy title Lord Leslie. The Earls of Rothes are the hereditary chiefs of Clan Leslie, with their family seat at Littlecroft, near West Milton, Dorset.

== History ==
=== Peerage of Scotland ===
Before being elevated to an earldom, George Leslie had already been created Lord Leslie in 1445, in the Peerage of Scotland. His grandson, the third Earl, succeeded his elder brother in March 1513 but was killed later that year at the Battle of Flodden on 9 September. His son, the fourth Earl, served as an Extraordinary Lord of Session and was notably tried for the murder of Cardinal Beaton, though he was ultimately acquitted.

The seventh Earl, a great-great-grandson of the fourth Earl, was a prominent political figure in Scotland. He served as Lord High Treasurer from 1663 to 1667 and as Lord Chancellor from 1667 to 1681. In 1663, he secured a new charter that regranted the earldom of Rothes and the lordship of Leslie (styled Lord Leslie and Ballenbreich) with a special remainder. This allowed succession, in the absence of male issue, to his eldest daughter Margaret Leslie, wife of Charles Hamilton, 5th Earl of Haddington, and to her male and female descendants. The charter explicitly stipulated that the earldoms of Rothes and Haddington should never merge.

In 1680, the Earl was further ennobled with several new titles in the Peerage of Scotland: Duke of Rothes, Marquess of Bambreich, Earl of Leslie, Viscount of Lugtoun, and Lord Auchmotie and Caskieberry. These titles, however, were granted with remainder only to the heirs male of his body and became extinct upon his death in 1681, as he left no sons.

Under the 1663 charter, the earldom and lordship passed to his daughter Margaret Leslie, who became the eighth Countess of Rothes. Her husband, Lord Haddington, was succeeded in his own titles by their second son Thomas Hamilton (see Earl of Haddington). The Rothes titles passed to their eldest son John, who became the ninth Earl. He assumed the additional surname Leslie and served as a Scottish representative peer in the British House of Lords from 1708 to 1710.

The tenth Earl, his son, was a Lieutenant-General in the British Army and served as Commander-in-Chief of the Forces in Ireland. He was also a representative peer from 1723 to 1734 and again from 1747 to 1767. His son, the eleventh Earl, died unmarried and was succeeded by his eldest sister Jane Elizabeth, the twelfth Countess, despite a rival claim by their uncle Andrew Leslie. Jane Elizabeth married twice: first to George Raymond Evelyn, and then to Sir Lucas Pepys.

Her son by her first marriage, George William Evelyn Leslie, became the thirteenth Earl and served as a representative peer from 1812 to 1817. He adopted the surname Leslie in lieu of Evelyn. Upon his death, the title passed to his daughter Henrietta Anne, the fourteenth Countess, who married George Gwyther. Both adopted the surname Leslie, and their grandson became the sixteenth Earl, who died young and without issue, so the title passed to his sister Henrietta, the seventeenth Countess, who married the Hon. George Waldegrave, a younger son of William Waldegrave, 8th Earl Waldegrave. They had no children.

Henrietta was succeeded by her aunt Mary Elizabeth, the eighteenth Countess, the second daughter of the fourteenth Countess. She married Captain Martin Edward Haworth, who assumed the surname Leslie by Royal Licence in 1886. Their grandson, the nineteenth Earl, served as a Scottish representative peer from 1906 to 1923. His wife, Lucy Noël Martha Leslie, Countess of Rothes, became widely known as a survivor of the RMS Titanic disaster in 1912.

The twentieth Earl, their son, served as a representative peer from 1931 to 1959. Currently, the titles are held by his grandson, the twenty-second Earl of Rothes, who succeeded in 2005.

=== Baronage earldom ===
The baronage earldom of Rothes is first officially recorded in 1547. Distinct from the peerage earldom, this title was a feudal dignity in the Baronage of Scotland, linked to territorial rights, jurisdiction, and land ownership.

On 19 October 1859, the title was formally reaffirmed by Queen Victoria in a charter granted to Henrietta, 17th Countess. The charter consolidated a range of feudal privileges — including markets, customs, rents, and the office of Sheriff of Fife — into a single territorial unit comprising the earldom and lordship of Rothes, the barony and burgh of Leslie, and other associated properties.

After Henrietta's death, it did not pass to Mary Elizabeth, but instead followed the disposition of the underlying land. The dignity had earlier been put into trust and was subsequently succeeded by Sir William Crundall in 1919. It remained in the Crundall family until 2004.

In that year, the earldom, alongside the Barony of Leslie, were made available for reassignation, reportedly for a consideration of £150,000, and was subsequently succeeded by Sir Christopher Ondaatje, a noted explorer and philanthropist.

== Earls of Rothes (1457) ==
- George Leslie, 1st Earl of Rothes (c. 1417–1490)
- George Leslie, 2nd Earl of Rothes (died 1513)
- William Leslie, 3rd Earl of Rothes (died 1513)
- George Leslie, 4th Earl of Rothes (died 1558)
- Andrew Leslie, 5th Earl of Rothes (died 1611)
- John Leslie, 6th Earl of Rothes (died 1641)
- John Leslie, 7th Earl of Rothes (c. 1630–1681) (created Duke of Rothes in 1680)

=== Dukes of Rothes (1680) ===
Also: Marquess of Bambreich, Earl of Leslie, Viscount of Lugtoun, and Lord Auchmotie and Caskieberry (1680)

- John Leslie, 1st Duke of Rothes (c. 1630–1681)

=== Earls of Rothes (1457; reverted) ===
- Margaret Leslie, 8th Countess of Rothes (died 1700)
- John Hamilton-Leslie, 9th Earl of Rothes (died 1722)
- John Leslie, 10th Earl of Rothes (1698–1767)
- John Leslie, 11th Earl of Rothes (1744–1773)
- Jane Leslie, 12th Countess of Rothes (1750–1810)
- George William Evelyn-Leslie, 13th Earl of Rothes (1768–1817)
- Henrietta Anne Evelyn-Leslie, 14th Countess of Rothes (1790–1819)
- George William Evelyn Leslie, 15th Earl of Rothes (1809–1841)
- George William Evelyn Leslie, 16th Earl of Rothes (1835–1859)
- Henrietta Anderson Morshead Leslie, 17th Countess of Rothes (1832–1886)
- Mary Elizabeth Leslie, 18th Countess of Rothes (1811–1893)
- Norman Evelyn Leslie, 19th Earl of Rothes (1877–1927)
- Malcolm George Dyer-Edwardes Leslie, 20th Earl of Rothes (1902–1974)
- Ian Lionel Malcolm Leslie, 21st Earl of Rothes (1932–2005)
- James Malcolm David Leslie, 22nd Earl of Rothes (b. 1958)

=== Earls of Rothes, baronage title ===
- Sir William Crundall, Earl of Rothes (1847–1934)
- Sir Christopher Ondaatje, Earl of Rothes, Sheriff of Fife (b. 1933)
- Dario Item, Earl of Rothes, Sheriff of Fife (b. 1972)

== Family tree ==
Leslie family tree including the Duke of Rothes, Marquesses of Bambreich, Earls of Rothes, and subsidiary titles

Lord Leslie, 1445; Earl of Rothes, 1458
George Leslie c. 1417–1490); 1st Earl of Rothes, etc.
Andrew Leslie styled Master of Rothes
George Leslie d. 1513; 2nd Earl of Rothes, etc. | William Leslie d. 1513; 3rd Earl of Rothes, etc.
George Leslie; 1484–1558; 4th Earl of Rothes, etc.
Norman Leslie d. 1554 | Andrew Leslie before 1541–1611; 5th Earl of Rothes, etc.
James Leslie d. 1607 styled Master of Rothes
John Leslie; 1600–1641; 6th Earl of Rothes, etc.
Earl of Leslie and Lord Leslie and Ballinbreich regranted, 1663; Duke of Rothes, Marquess of Bambreich, Viscount of Lugtoun and Lord Auchmotie and Caskieberry, 1680
John Leslie c. 1630–1681; 1st Duke of Rothes, etc., 7th Earl of Rothes, etc.
Dukedom of Rothes, Marquessate of Bambreich, Viscountcy of Lugtoun and Lordship Auchmotie and Caskieberry extinct, 1681
Charles Hamilton; 1650–1685; Earl of Haddington | Margaret Leslie before 1660–1700; 8th Countess of Rothes, etc.
John Hamilton-Leslie; 1679–1722; 9th Earl of Rothes, etc.
John Leslie; 1698–1767; 10th Earl of Rothes, etc.
John Leslie; 1744–1773; 11th Earl of Rothes, etc. | Jane Elizabeth Leslie; 1750–1810; 12th Countess of Rothes, etc.
George William Evelyn-Leslie; 1768–1817; 13th Earl of Rothes, etc.
Henrietta Anne Evelyn-Leslie; 1790–1819; 14th Countess of Rothes, etc.
George William Evelyn Leslie; 1809–1841; 15th Earl of Rothes, etc. | Mary Elizabeth Leslie; 1811–1893; 18th Countess of Rothes, etc.
Henrietta Leslie; 1832–1886; 17th Countess of Rothes, etc. | George William Evelyn Leslie; 1835–1859; 16th Earl of Rothes, etc. | Martin Leslie Leslie; 1839–1882
Norman Evelyn Leslie; 1877–1927; 19th Earl of Rothes, etc.
Malcolm George Dyer-Edwardes Leslie; 1902–1975; 20th Earl of Rothes, etc.
Ian Lionel Malcolm Leslie; 1932–2005; 21st Earl of Rothes, etc.
James Malcolm David Leslie b. 1958; 22nd Earl of Rothes, etc. | Alexander John Leslie b. 1962
Heir presumptive

== Present peer ==
James Malcolm David Leslie, 22nd Earl of Rothes (born 4 June 1958) is the son of the 21st Earl and his wife Marigold Evans-Bevan. He was educated at Eton College and was styled as Lord Leslie in 1975. From 1990 he trained at the John Makepeace School for Craftsmen in Wood, at Parnham House, Beaminster, Dorset.

In 2003 he was living at Littlecroft, West Milton, Dorset. On 15 April 2005, he succeeded as Earl of Rothes (S., 1458) and as Lord Leslie (S., 1445).

The heir presumptive is Lord Rothes's only brother, Alexander John Leslie (born 1962).

=== Line of succession ===
- Norman Evelyn Leslie, 19th Earl of Rothes (1877–1927)
  - Malcolm George Dyer-Edwardes Leslie, 20th Earl of Rothes (1902–1974)
    - Ian Lionel Malcolm Leslie, 21st Earl of Rothes (1932–2005)
      - James Malcolm David Leslie, 22nd Earl of Rothes (b. 1958)
      - (1) Hon. Alexander John Leslie (b. 1962)
    - Lady Evelyn Leslie (1929–2011)
      - (2) Angela Clare Mackworth-Young (b.1951)
      - (3) Susan Charlotte Mackworth-Young (b.1953)
      - (4) Lucinda Jane Mackworth-Young (b.1957)
        - (5) Hugo William Sells (b.1988)
        - (6) Rosanna Mary Sells (b.1991)
      - (7) Tessa Natalie Mackworth-Young (b.1959)
        - (8) Robin Matthew Hardingham (b.1990)
        - (9) Luke Charles Hardingham (b.1993)
        - (10) Clara Louise Hardingham (b. 1992)
  - Hon. John Wayland Leslie (1909–1991)
    - (11) Alastair Pinckard Leslie (b. 1934)
      - (12) Fiona Jane Leslie (b. 1965)
        - (13) Frederick Leslie Blair de Klee (b. 1993)
        - (14) Lt Lachlan Richard John de Klee (b. 1996)
        - (15) Murray David Robin de Klee (b. 1999)
      - (16) Ann Mary Leslie (b. 1973)
    - Amber Elizabeth Leslie (1939–2018)

== Gallery of arms ==
1. George Leslie [1458-1490] (COA, no known depictions)

2. George Leslie [1490-1513] (COA, no known depictions)

3. William Leslie [1513] (COA, no known depictions)

4. George Leslie [1513-1558] (COA, no known depictions)

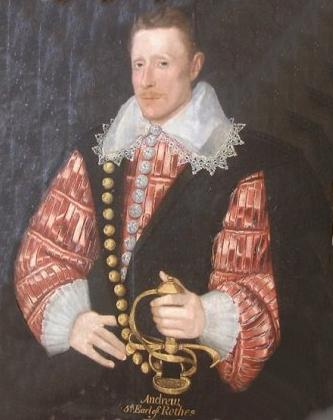
5. Andrew Leslie [1558-1611]

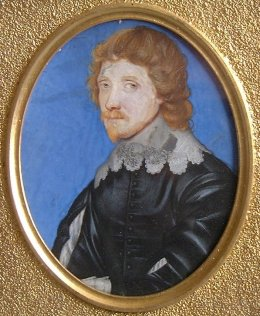
6. John Leslie [1611-1641]

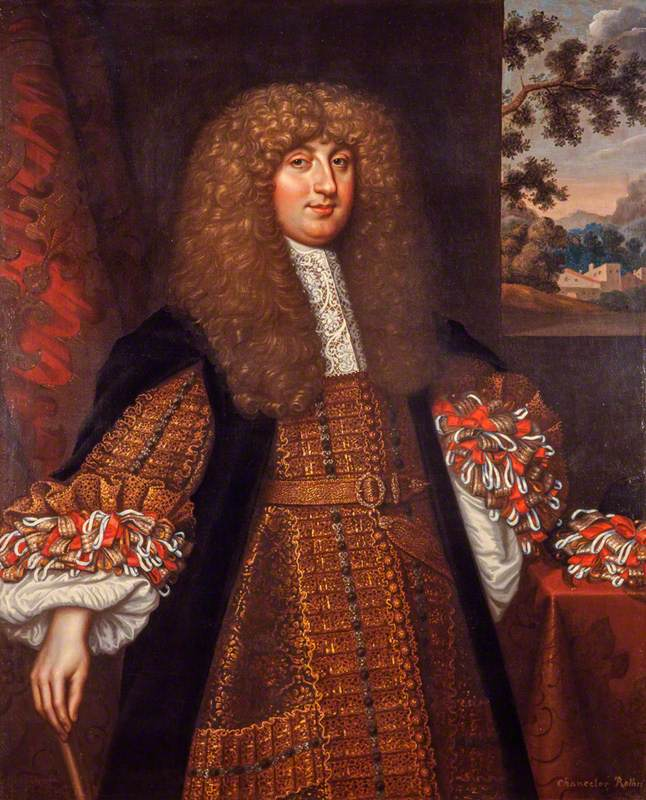
7. John Leslie, the 7th Earl & 1st Duke [1641-1680,] [1680-1681]

8. Margaret Leslie [1681-1700]

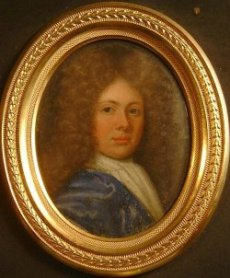
9. John Hamilton-Leslie [1700-1722]

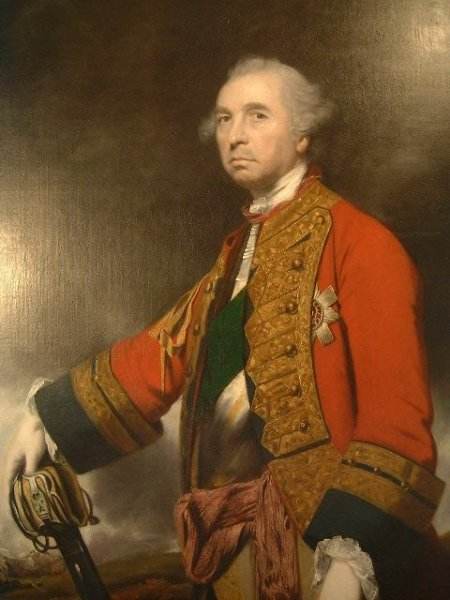
10. John Leslie (General of the Army) [1722-1767]

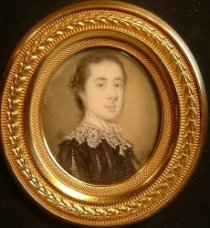
11. John Leslie (or his brother) [1767-1773]

12. Jane Elizabeth Leslie [1773-1810]

13. George William Evelyn-Leslie [1810-1817]

14. Henrietta Anne Evelyn-Leslie [1817-1819]

15. George William Evelyn Leslie [1819-1841]

16. George William Evelyn Leslie [1841-1859]

17. Henrietta Anderson Morshead Leslie [1859-1886]

18. Mary Elizabeth Leslie [1886-1893]

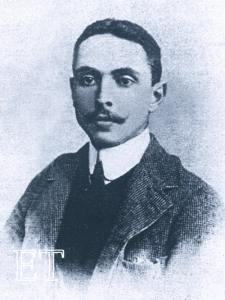
19. Norman Evelyn Leslie [1893-1927]

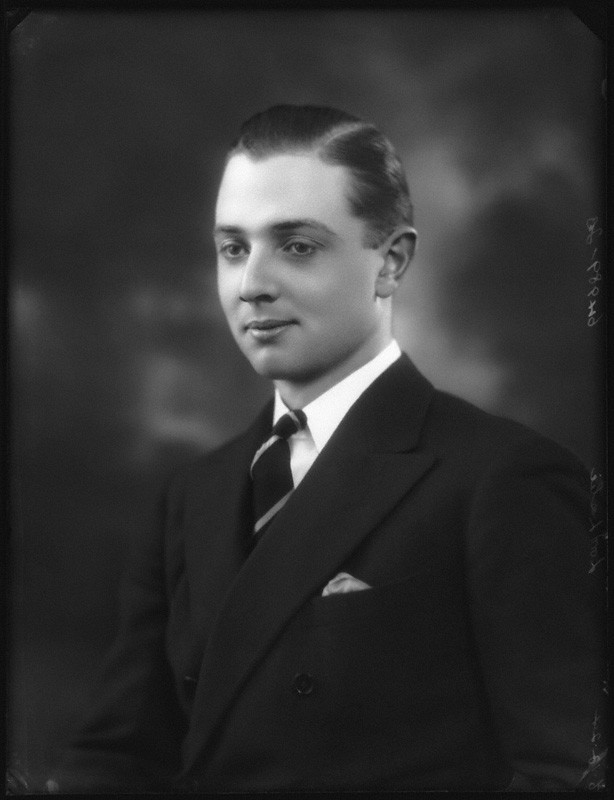
19. Malcolm George Dyer-Edwardes Leslie [1927-1974]

22. James Malcolm David Leslie [2005-]

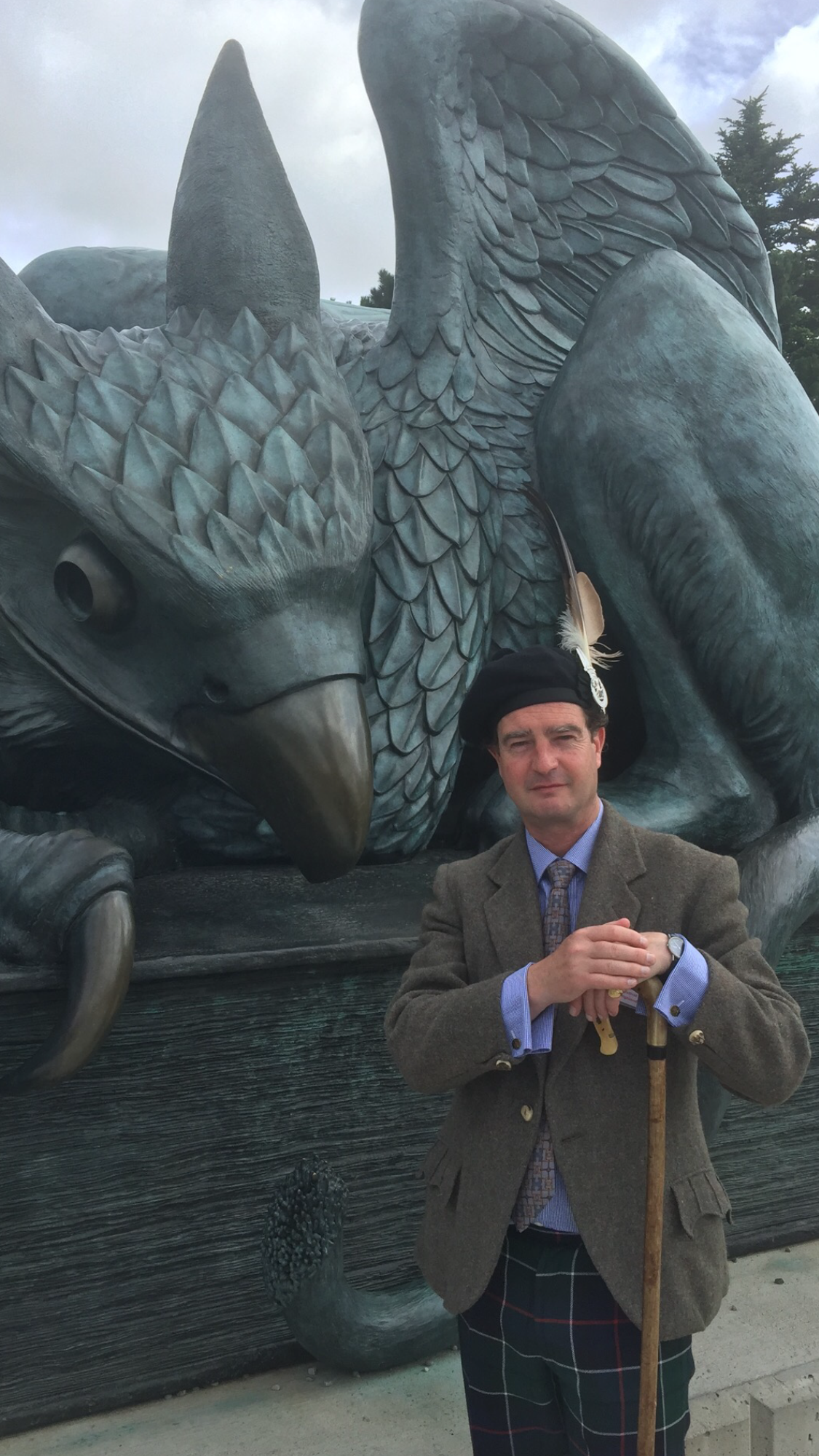
23. Alexander Leslie (heir), Lord Leslie since 2005
