= Lucy Clementina Davies =

Lucy Clementina Davies (née Drummond de Melfort; 21 November 1795 – 27 April 1879) was a French-born author of Scottish Jacobite ancestry, known as a writer by the publication in 1872 of her two-volume Recollections of Society in France and England, a work which contains much of her family history and interesting details of the court of France under the Bourbons and the Bonapartes. She was the only sister of George Drummond, 5th Earl of Perth (1807–1902), also de jure 14th Earl of Perth, 6th Earl of Melfort, 6th Duc de Melfort, Comte de Lussan.

== Life ==
Davies was born at the Château of St. Germain to Marie Elizabeth Luce de Longuemarre (died 1824) and Lord Leon Maurice Drummond de Melfort (1761–1826), the fourth son of James Drummond, 3rd Duke of Melfort in France. Her father's elder brother would have been thirteenth earl of Perth but for the attainder of his ancestor. Her brother George's claim to be heir male of the Earls of Perth was admitted by the House of Lords in 1848, and the attainder was reversed in his favour on 28 June 1853, and she herself was granted a patent of precedence as an earl's daughter on 30 September 1853. She was educated in Scotland under Miss Playfair, sister of Professor Playfair, and in the various changes of residence of her parents between France and England. She saw a great deal of life, and at times suffered some hardships.

On 8 September 1823, in Marylebone, London, she was married to Francis Henry Davies, a registrar of the Court of Chancery. They had one son and two daughters, including Lucy Elizabeth Drummond Davies, a children's writer. Her husband died at Koblenz on the Rhine on 22 October 1863, aged 72. Lady Lucy Clementina Drummond, Mrs. Davies, died on 27 April 1879 in Kensington, London at 22 Palace Gardens Terrace, the residence of her son-in-law John Sale Barker, barrister-at-law.

== Publication ==
- Recollections of society in France and England. Vol. I. by Lady Clementina Davies. Publisher: Hurst and Blackett London, 1872
- Recollections of society in France and England. Vol. II.
