= Lordscairnie Castle =

Scottish castle ruins

Coordinates: 56°20′54.94″N 3°3′15.27″W

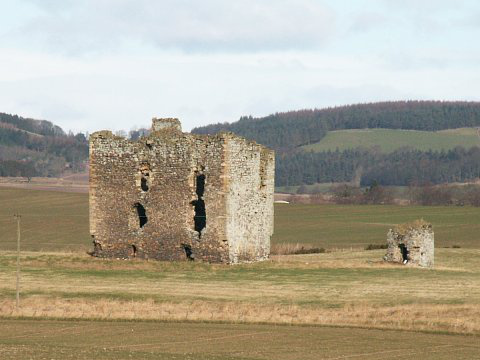
Lordscairnie Castle

Lordscairnie Castle is a ruin situated near Moonzie, 2.5 miles (4.0 km) north-east of Cupar, in Fife, Scotland. It is protected as a scheduled monument.

== History ==
Cairnie was a property of the Lindsay family, later Earls of Crawford, from 1355. The tower was constructed around 1500 by Alexander Lindsay of Auchtermoonzie (died 1517). The second son of the 4th earl of Crawford, Alexander subsequently became 7th earl, inheriting the earldom from his nephew who was killed at the Battle of Flodden in 1513. According to John Knox, James V of Scotland visited the castle just before his death in 1542.

James VI visited Ballinbreich Castle in June 1583 and then went on to Lordscarnie. James Stewart, Earl of Arran stayed at "Carnye, the house of Crawford" in July 1583. In September 1583, after the collapse of the Gowrie Regime, Robert Pitcairn negotiated to be released from Lochleven Castle to be held on bond at Lordscairnie.

The castle was unoccupied in the 17th century, and was used for religious meetings by an outlawed Episcopal congregation. It was later used for agricultural purposes.

== Description ==
It was originally an L-plan tower house with five storeys, including a barrel-vaulted basement and a garret. The stair tower is located on the north-west side, linking all floors from a ground floor entrance. The parapet and many of the dressed stones forming the window surrounds have been lost. To the north-east is a single round tower, once flanking a gate within an outer enclosure wall.

== Potential restoration ==
In 1997 the castle was bought by an American entrepreneur, Robert Bourne, who planned to restore it as a second home and a retreat for software developers. From 1997 to 2003 he completed a program of historical research, geophysical and archaeological exploration of the site, detailed engineering and design surveys and other pre-planning consent work under the guidance of Historic Scotland; the castle was subsequently sold to a local hotelier. It was on the market again in 2012, with an asking price in the region of £220,000. It was estimated that at least £1 million would be needed to undertake restoration.
