= William Leslie, 3rd Earl of Rothes =

3rd Earl of Rothes

William Leslie (died 9 September 1513), 3rd Earl of Rothes, was the son of Andrew Leslie, Master of Rothes, and Marjory (also known as Elizabeth) Sinclair, daughter of William Sinclair, 1st Earl of Caithness. He succeeded his elder brother George as Earl in 1513.

As George had tried to sell the family lands without royal permission William was trying to recover his rights, especially over the Barony centred on Ballinbreich Castle. However, he was killed at the battle of Flodden.

William married Margaret Balfour, and his heir was George Leslie, 4th Earl of Rothes. Their other children included John Leslie of Parkhill who was captured at the battle of Solway Moss, and James Leslie, Parson of Rothes.

Peerage of Scotland
Preceded by George Leslie	Earl of Rothes; 1513	Succeeded by George Leslie
