= George Leslie, 2nd Earl of Rothes =

Scottish peer

George Leslie (the Second)
- Earl of Rothes
- Predecessor: George Leslie I
- Successor: William Leslie
- Father: Andrew Leslie, Master of Rothes
- Mother: Marjorie Sinclair

George Leslie, 2nd Earl of Rothes (died 1513) was a Scottish peer. He was the son of Andrew Leslie, Master of Rothes and Marjorie Sinclair (daughter of William Sinclair, 1st Earl of Caithness), and the grandson of George Leslie, 1st Earl of Rothes.

George was invested in his lands as Earl of Rothes on 25 May 1492. In 1498 George was summoned to trial for the murder of George Leslie alias Dunlop, and failed to appear in subsequent years. In 1509, the Leslie lands were recognized by James IV of Scotland. The King took back the family's feudal title because George had tried to sell the lands without permission. Chief amongst the lands was the title of the Barony of Ballinbreich Castle.

George married Janet Douglas (daughter of George Douglas, 4th Earl of Angus), who was about ten years older than him, between 1484 and 1488, but was without issue. He died before March 1513, and was succeeded as Earl by his brother, William.

Peerage of Scotland
Preceded by George Leslie	Earl of Rothes; 1490–1513	Succeeded by William Leslie
