= George Cunningham Leslie =

Royal Navy Rear Admiral (1920-1988)

Rear-Admiral George Cunningham Leslie CB OBE
- Born: 27 October 1920; England, UK
- Died: 14 November 1988 (aged 68); Oxford, Oxfordshire, England, UK
- Occupations: Royal Navy officer, retired as rear-admiral, then domestic bursar and fellow of St Edmund Hall, Oxford 1970–1988
- Awards: OBE CB (UK) OON (Netherlands) Order of St Olav (Norway)

George Cunningham Leslie CB OBE (27 October 1920 – 14 November 1988) was a senior Royal Naval officer who joined the Royal Navy in 1938. He saw extensive service during the Second World War and in the postwar Royal Navy. He retired with the rank of rear admiral in 1970.

== Early life ==
Leslie was the fourth son of Col A S Leslie CMG, WS Kininvie and Mrs M I Leslie (née Horne). He joined the Royal Navy in 1938.

== Second World War service ==
During the Second World War, Leslie served in the cruiser HMS York from 1939 to 1940 then transferred to the destroyer HMS Harvester in 1941. From 1942 to 1943 he served on the destroyer HMS Volunteer. This was followed by service on the destroyers HMS Cassandra 1944 to 1945 and HMS Chevron from 1945 to 1946.

It was while serving on HMS Cassandra during Arctic convoys to Russia that his ship was attacked and had her bow blown off. On 30 November 1944, the Cassandra, with three other destroyers of the 6th Flotilla, left Scapa Flow to cover the passage of the North Russian Convoy JW62 (31 ships), as part of Operation Acumen, which had left Loch Ewe on the previous day. The Home Fleet was under the command of Rear-Admiral Rhoderick McGrigor, with his flag in the escort aircraft carrier Campania. Despite a U-boat concentration off the Kola Inlet in Northern Russia, convoy JW 62, consisting of thirty merchant ships, arrived safely in the Kola Inlet on 7 December and the White Sea portion on 9 December. He served aboard HMS Cassandra during Operation Acumen, which was the suppression of submarine attacks on convoys in the Atlantic supplying the USSR. The return convoy, RA62 (28 ships), left the Kola Inlet on 10 December. It was attacked by U-boats and torpedo bomber aircraft, and while no merchant ships were lost or damaged, the Cassandra was torpedoed by U-boat U-365 under the command of Oberleutnant zur See Diether Todenhagen at 0600 on 11 December when about 165 miles north of the Kola Inlet, to which she returned, escorted by the 20th Escort Group, under tow. Sixty-two men died in the attack and Cassandra had her bow blown off.

Leslie was awarded the OBE for his devotion to duty and actions during this incident. The torpedo had blown off her bow forward of B gun, and the Cassandra took no further part in the war. She was brought alongside at Rosta for temporary repairs and the cutting away of the damaged portion, but owing to delays, and especially the shortage of steel plate locally, it was not until 14 June 1945 that she was able to leave Kola for Rosyth, arriving on the 18th under the escort of HMS Onslaught. As an aside, HMS Cassandra would have had three bows during her lifetime.

== Postwar Royal Navy service ==
- Commanding HMS Wrangler 1950–1951
- Commanding HMS Wilton 1951
- Commanding HMS Surprise 1954–1955
- Captain Fishery Protection Squadron 1960–1962 (HMS Duncan)
- Commodore Royal Naval Barracks Devonport, HMS Drake, 1964–1965
- Commanding HMS Devonshire 1966–1967
- Flag officer, Admiralty Interview Board 1967–1968
- North Atlantic Treaty Organisation (NATO) Headquarters, Brussels 1968–1970
- Retired 1970

== Promotions ==
- Acting sub lieutenant, 1 September 1940
- Lieutenant, 1 May 1941
- Lieutenant commander, 1 November 1948
- Commander, 30 June 1952
- Captain, 30 June 1958
- Rear admiral, 7 January 1968 (Retired 17 November 1970)

== Later professional life ==
After retiring from the navy, Leslie became the domestic bursar and fellow of St Edmund Hall, Oxford 1970-1988

== Honours and awards ==
In 1945 he was awarded the OBE. In 1950 he was awarded the OON by the Queen of the Netherlands, Juliana, on a visit to London. The Order of St. Olav was awarded on a state visit of the King of Norway to Edinburgh in 1962. He was awarded the Companion of the Bath (CB) in 1970 on promotion to the rank of Rear Admiral

== Personal life ==
He was married in 1953 to Margaret Rose Leslie, and they had a son and three daughters. She died in 2017.
