= Malcolm Leslie, 20th Earl of Rothes =

British noble (1902–1975)

The Right Honourable The Earl of Rothes
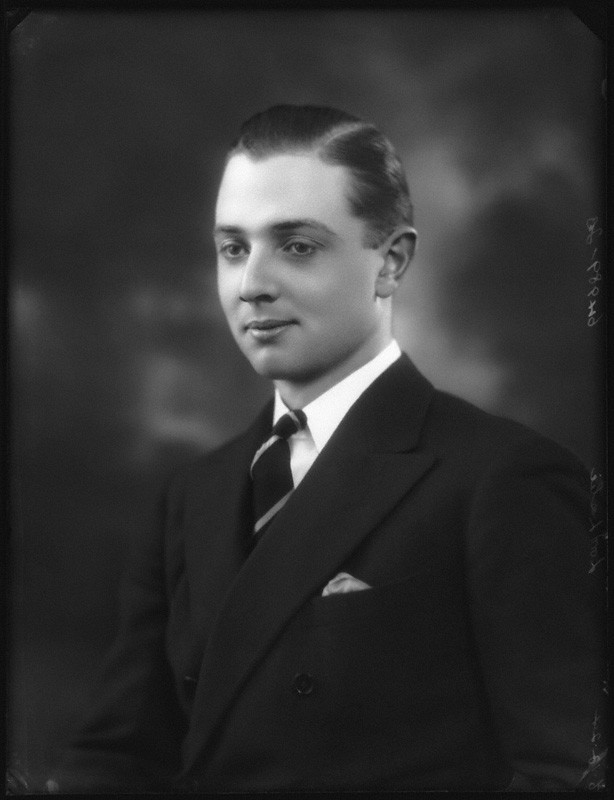
- Lord Rothes in 1924

Scottish representative peer
- In office 29 October 1931 – 18 September 1959
- Preceded by: The Lord Lauderdale
- Succeeded by: The Lord Carnwath

Personal details
- Born: Malcolm George Dyer-Edwardes Leslie; 8 February 1902 Kensington, London, England
- Died: 17 May 1975 (aged 73) Hounslow, London, England
- Spouse: Beryl Dugdale (m. 1926)
- Children: 3; including Ian Leslie, 21st Earl of Rothes
- Parent(s): Norman Leslie, 19th Earl of Rothes; Lucy Noël Martha Dyer-Edwardes

Malcolm George Dyer-Edwardes Leslie, 20th Earl of Rothes (8 February 1902 – 17 May 1975) was a Scottish nobleman, and the head of Clan Leslie. He was the Earl of Rothes from 1927 until 1975, following the death of his father, Norman Leslie, 19th Earl of Rothes.

== Early life ==
Malcolm George Dyer-Edwardes Leslie was born on 8 February 1902 in Kensington. His father was Norman Leslie, 19th Earl of Rothes, a Scottish nobleman. His mother was Noël Leslie, Countess of Rothes, who not only survived the Titanic disaster, but took the tiller of a lifeboat and helped row survivors to the RMS Carpathia.

== Marriage and children ==
On 17 July 1926, he married Beryl Dugdale, daughter of Lionel Dugdale of Crathorne, a former High Sheriff of Yorkshire, and sister of Thomas Dugdale, 1st Baron Crathorne.

They had three children:

- Lady Jean Leslie (1927–2017). Married in 1949 to Roderick Robin Mackenzie.
- Lady Evelyn Leslie (1929–2011). Married in 1949 to Sir Gerard William Mackworth-Young, son of Gerard Mackworth Young.
- Ian Lionel Malcolm Leslie, 21st Earl of Rothes (1932–2005). Married in 1955 to Marigold Evans-Bevan, daughter of David Evans-Bevan.

His son succeeded him in 1975 as the Earl of Rothes.

== Career ==
He worked as Chairman of the National Mutual Life Assurance Society.

He succeeded as the 20th Earl of Rothes on the death of his father in 1927. He served as a Scottish representative peer until this system was abolished.

== Death and legacy ==
The Earl died on 7 May 1975. The Rothes Chair in Preventive Ophthalmology was established at London University in his memory in 1977.

Peerage of Scotland
Preceded by Norman Leslie	Earl of Rothes; 1927 – 1975	Succeeded by Ian Leslie
