= Ballinbreich Castle =

Tower house in Fife, Scotland

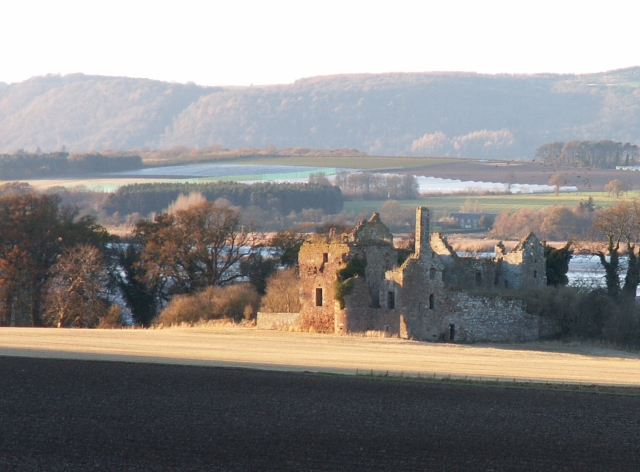
- Ruins of the castle
- Interactive map of Ballinbreich Castle
- 56.37107°N 3.18049°W
- Type: Castle
- OS grid reference: NO 27181 20488

History
- Built: 14th-16th century
- Built by: Clan Leslie

Site notes
- Material: Stone
- Condition: Ruined
- Public access: Yes

Scheduled monument
- Official name: Ballinbreich Castle
- Designated: 23 July 1935
- Reference no.: SM844

Ballinbreich Castle is a ruined tower house castle in Fife, Scotland.

The castle was built in the 14th century by Clan Leslie, and subsequently rebuilt several times. There may have been an outer curtain-wall though this no longer survives. Much of the present structure is of 16th-century date. It is a three-storey L-plan castle and overlooks the Firth of Tay. Ballinbreich is a scheduled monument. It was a home of the Leslie family, Earl of Rothes.

Early maps of the castle by Timothy Pont and John Adair at the National Library of Scotland show the castle within a curving wall or earth bank. From the air, two curving enclosures can be seen, the crop mark remains of ditches. The inner area was probably the 16th-century garden, and rectilinear crop marks within the larger enclosure may have been later garden features.

Mary, Queen of Scots stayed at the castle on 23 March 1563 and 26 January 1565. During the 1565 rebellion known as the Chaseabout Raid, Mary and Lord Darnley ordered James Stewart, 1st Earl of Moray and William Kirkcaldy of Grange to surrender the Abbot's house at St. Andrews, Ballinbreich, and Hallyards Castle to their officers.

Regent Morton made a progress in September 1575. He came to Ballinbreich from Tullibardine and went on to Huntingtower Castle to the christening of James Ruthven, 2nd Earl of Gowrie. James VI stopped at Ballinbreich on 28 June 1583 (18 June O.S.) then went on to Lordscarnie, belonging to Sir Robert Melville.

== See also ==
- Scheduled monuments in Fife
