= Ian Leslie, 21st Earl of Rothes =

British Royal Navy officer (1932–2005)

The Right Honourable The Earl of Rothes
- Born: Ian Lionel Malcolm Leslie; 10 May 1932; Chelsea, London, England
- Died: 15 April 2005 (aged 72); Salisbury, Wiltshire, England
- Education: Eton College
- Spouse: Marigold Evans-Bevan (m. 1955)
- Children: James Leslie, 22nd Earl of Rothes; The Hon. Alexander Leslie
- Parent(s): Malcolm Leslie, 20th Earl of Rothes; Beryl Dugdale

Ian Lionel Malcolm Leslie, 21st Earl of Rothes (10 May 1932 – 15 April 2005) was a Scottish nobleman.

He was a member of the House of Lords from 1974 to 1999.

== Early life ==
Born on 10 May 1932, Rothes began life as the Hon. Ian Lionel Malcolm Leslie, eldest son of Malcolm Leslie and his wife Beryl Violet Dulgdale. From birth he had the title "Master of Rothes".

He was educated at Eton and in 1953 was commissioned as a Sub-Lieutenant into the Royal Naval Volunteer Reserve.

Upon his father's death in 1974 he became Earl of Rothes and gained a seat in the House of Lords. He was popular within Leslie and Glenrothes. In 2003, however, he moved to England.

== Personal life ==
In 1955, he married Marigold Evans-Bevan of Wales, daughter of Sir David Evans-Bevan. They had two sons: James (born 1958) and Alexander (born 1962).

Lord Rothes died on 15 April 2005, aged 72, and was succeeded in the earldom by his eldest son, James, who was unmarried, so that the heir presumptive to the peerages is his brother the Hon. Alexander John Leslie (born 1962).

Peerage of Scotland
Preceded by Malcolm Leslie	Earl of Rothes; 1975–2005	Succeeded by James Leslie
