= West Milton, Dorset =

Village in Dorset, England

Coordinates: 50.7642°N 2.7079°W

West Milton
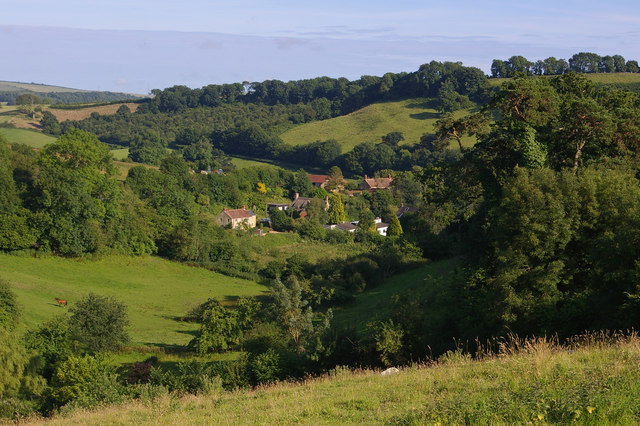
- West Milton seen from the north

- Location within Dorset
- OS grid reference: SY501963
- Civil parish: Powerstock
- Unitary authority: Dorset
- Ceremonial county: Dorset
- Region: South West
- Country: England
- Sovereign state: United Kingdom
- Post town: Bridport
- Postcode district: DT6
- Dialling code: 01308
- Police: Dorset
- Fire: Dorset and Wiltshire
- Ambulance: South Western
- UK Parliament: West Dorset
- Website: Powerstock

West Milton is a small village in western Dorset, in South West England, about 3 miles (5 km) northeast of Bridport and 1 mile (1.6 km) west of Powerstock. The village is on the Mangerton River, a tributary of the River Asker. West Milton is part of Powerstock civil parish.

== Toponymy ==
The name "Milton" is a contraction of "Middleton". The Domesday Book of AD 1086 records it as Mideltone. An entry for 1212 in the Book of Fees records it as Midelton.

It is derived from the Old English middel-tūn. The word tūn originally meant "fence", but came to mean "enclosure" or "homestead". Hence a Middelton was the middle homestead of a group. "West" distinguishes it from Milton Abbas near Blandford Forum.

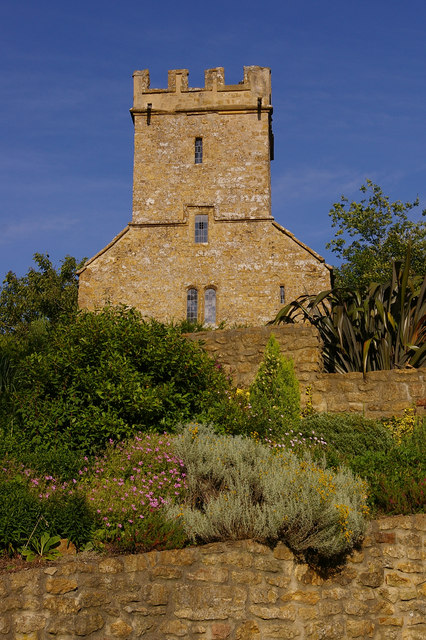
Early 16th-century tower of the former chapel of St Mary Magdalen

== Chapel and church ==
West Milton has long been a dependent chapelry of Powerstock. It had a Mediæval chapel of St Mary Magdalene, and in 1869 the architect GR Crickmay of Weymouth designed a new Gothic Revival chapel to replace it. This was built on a new site 1/2 mile (800 m) west of the old one and completed in 1874. It was a stone building with a spirelet on one side and an apse at one end.

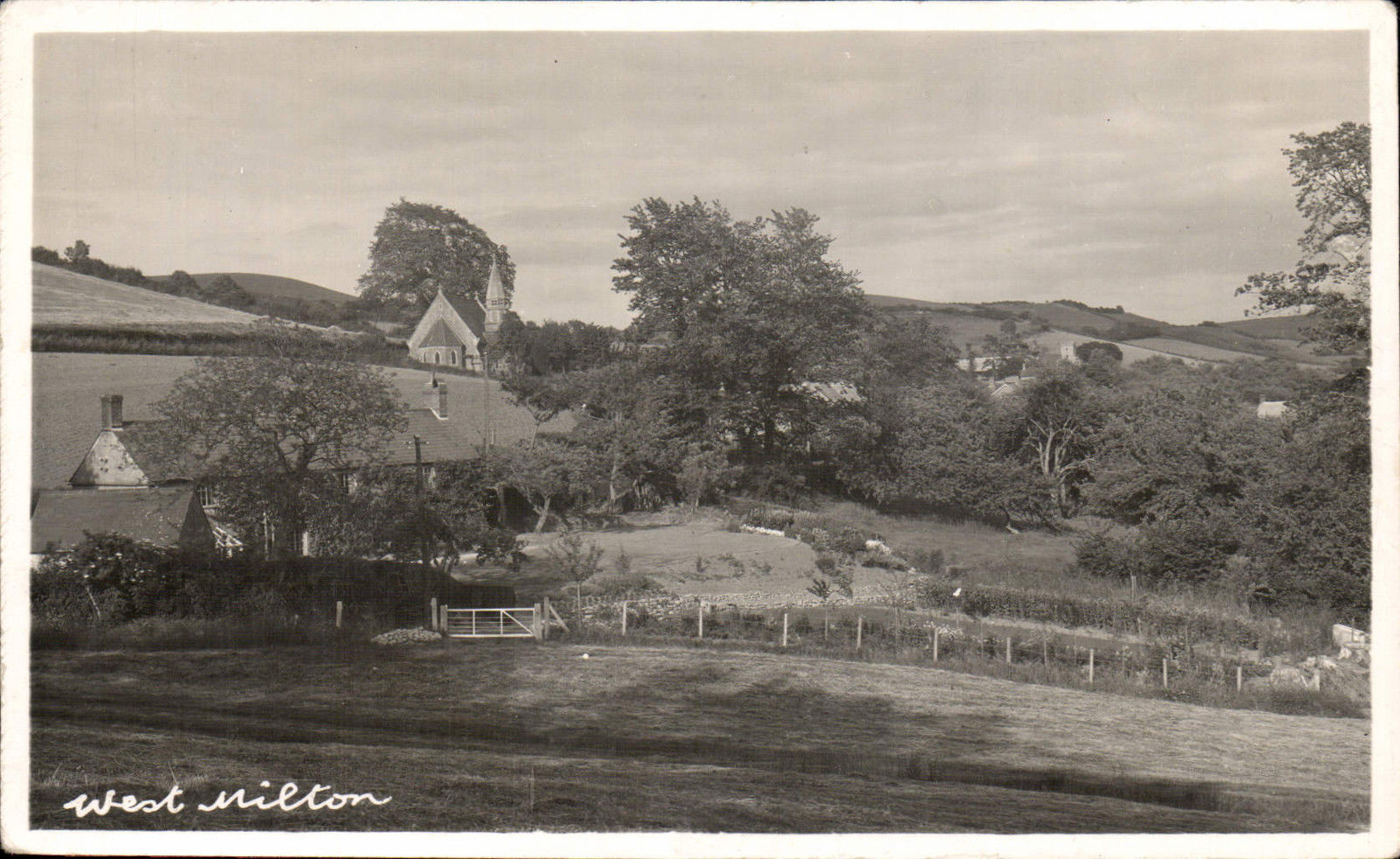
Historic photograph of West Milton, with the 19th-century church of St Mary Magdalene centre left

In 1873–76 the body of the Mediæval chapel was dismantled and re-erected in Powerstock as an extension to the parish school. Only the embattled west tower was left in West Milton. This was built about 1500 and is now both a Scheduled Ancient Monument and a Grade II* listed building.

In 1976 the 19th-century church was demolished.

== Secular history ==
The village used to have two pubs: The Leopard (now Leopard Cottage) and The Red Lion (now Red Lion Cottages). Further, there are records of ale being sold from 'The Ship' inn, however it is not known where this was in the village.

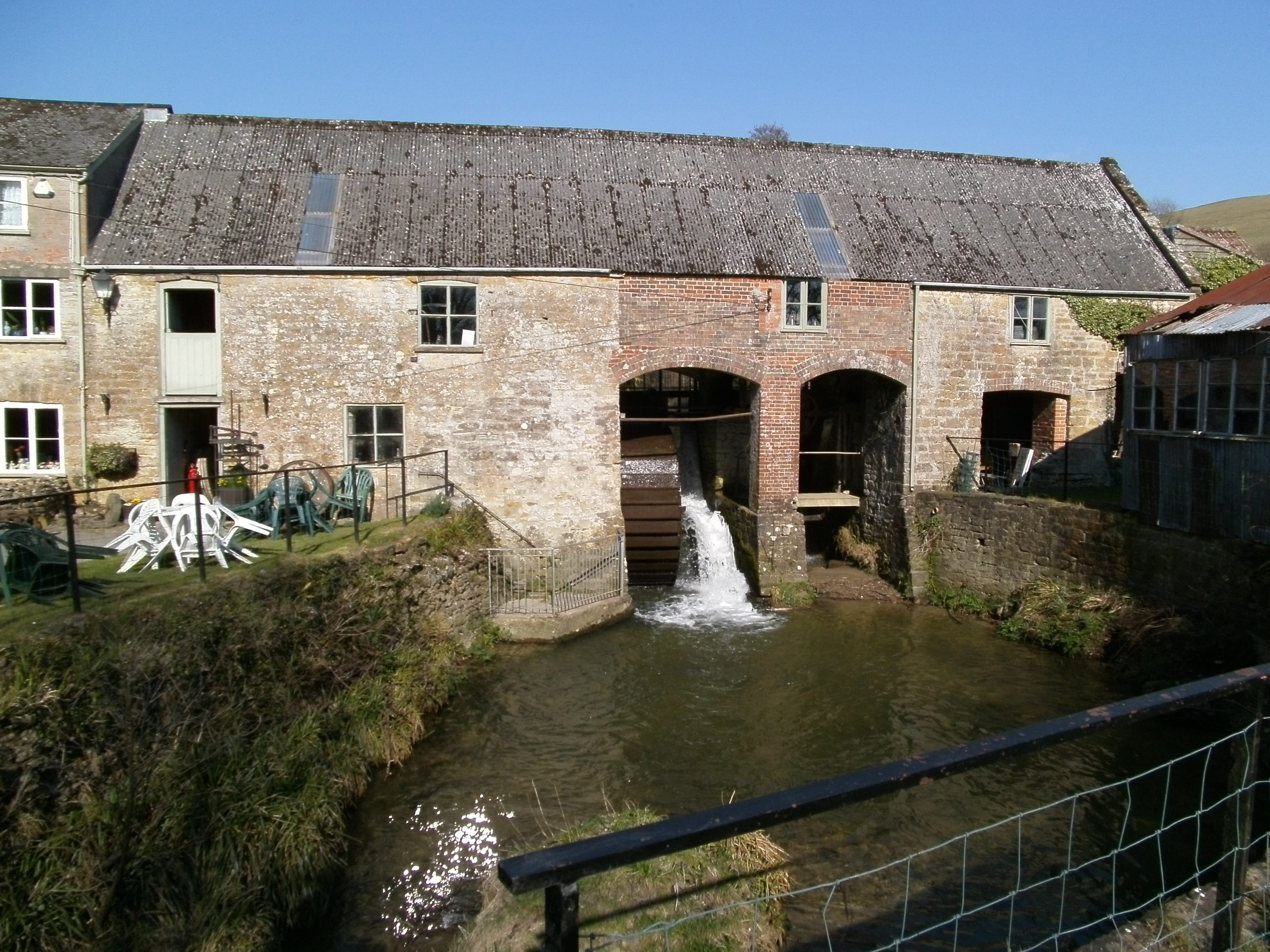
Mangerton Mill

In the hamlet of Mangerton, on the river about 1 mile (1.6 km) west of West Milton is an early 19th-century watermill. It was a grist and flax mill, and last worked commercially in 1966. It has since been a tourist attraction and café.

West Milton had its own watermill on the same river. The mill was the home of the writer and broadcaster Kenneth Allsop until his death in 1973. Here he wrote In the Country, a collection of essays mostly about the surrounding Dorset countryside.

== Bibliography ==
- Best, Rosemary (1970). Poorstock in Wessex. Dorset Publishing Company. p. 8. ISBN 090212904X.
- Connor, Tim (2016). West Milton: the last thousand years. Bridport: Milton Mill Publishing. p. 36. ISBN 978-0954057053.
- Ekwall, Eilert (1960) [1936]. Concise Oxford Dictionary of English Place-Names (4th ed.). Oxford: Oxford University Press. Milton. ISBN 0198691033.
- Gant, Roland (1980). Dorset Villages. Robert Hale Ltd. pp. 130–131. ISBN 0-7091-8135-3.
- Lewis, Samuel, ed. (1931) [1848]. A Topographical Dictionary of England. Vol. III (Seventh ed.). London: Samuel Lewis. p. 321.
- Newman, John; Pevsner, Nikolaus (1972). Dorset. The Buildings of England. Harmondsworth: Penguin Books. p. 446. ISBN 0-14-071044-2.
- Poole, Harry S (1987). The Gate on the Hill. Bridport: Hindson. p. 15.
