= Norman Leslie, 19th Earl of Rothes =

Scottish Earl (1877–1927)

Colonel The Right Honourable The Earl of Rothes
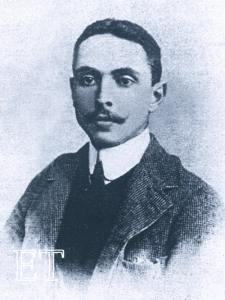
- Lord Rothes at the time of his marriage, c. April 1900.

Scottish representative peer
- In office 8 November 1906 – 16 November 1923
- Preceded by: The Earl of Leven
- Succeeded by: The Lord Sinclair

Personal details
- Born: 13 July 1877 London, England, United Kingdom
- Died: 29 March 1927 (aged 49) Chelsea, London, England, United Kingdom
- Resting place: Christ's Kirk on the Green Churchyard, Leslie, Fife, Scotland
- Spouse: Lucy Noël Martha Dyer-Edwardes (m. 1900)
- Children: 2, including Malcolm, 20th Earl of Rothes

Norman Evelyn Leslie, 19th Earl of Rothes (13 July 1877 – 29 March 1927) was a Scottish soldier and Scottish representative peer.

== Background ==
Norman Leslie was the son of Martin Leslie Leslie (born Martin Leslie Haworth-Leslie) and Georgina Frances Studdy, daughter of Henry Studdy, of Waddeton Court, Devon. Norman's paternal grandparents were Captain Martin Edward Haworth later Haworth-Leslie (d. 1886) and Mary Elizabeth Leslie, 18th Countess of Rothes. Norman succeeded his grandmother to the earldom in 1893.

== Military career ==
Lord Rothes was commissioned into the 4th Battalion (1st Devon Militia), Devonshire Regiment in 1895. He was promoted lieutenant in 1897 and resigned his commission in 1899. In 1905 he was appointed captain in the Fifeshire Royal Garrison Artillery (Militia). He resigned his commission in 1909. In 1911 he was appointed lieutenant-colonel commanding the Highland Cyclist Battalion of the Territorial Force, which was badged to the Black Watch.

The Earl of Rothes was elected a Scottish representative peer in 1906, a position he retained until 1923. He fought in the First World War and Leslie House, the ancestral family seat, became a hospital for the injured. His wife, Noël, Countess of Rothes, worked ceaselessly during the war, both at Leslie House and in London at the Coulter Hospital, serving as a Red Cross nurse. The earl was promoted to colonel in 1918. He sustained injuries during the war from which he never fully recovered. He sold Leslie House in 1919 and moved his family to England.

== Family ==
Lord Rothes married Lucy Noël Martha Dyer-Edwardes, daughter of Thomas Dyer-Edwardes Jr. and Clementina Georgina Lucy Drummond Villiers, on 19 April 1900 in London. They had two children:

- Malcolm George Dyer-Edwardes Leslie, 20th Earl of Rothes (8 February 1902–1975), married Beryl Violet Dugdale, daughter of Captain James Lionel Dugdale and Maud Violet Woodroffe, on 17 July 1926 and had issue.
- The Honourable John Wayland Leslie (b. 1909–1991).

Lady Rothes would later become best known for surviving the sinking of RMS Titanic, and helping man the lifeboat she was evacuated in. She had been on her way to London to meet Lord Rothes aboard the ship.

He died on 29 March 1927, aged 49, at their townhouse in Chelsea, London, and he was succeeded in the earldom by his eldest son, Malcolm.

Peerage of Scotland
Preceded by Mary Elizabeth Gwyther-Leslie	Earl of Rothes; 1893–1927	Succeeded by Malcolm Dyer-Edwards Leslie
