= George Leslie, 1st Earl of Rothes =

Scottish nobleman

George Leslie
- Earl of Rothes

Earl of Rothes
- Term: 1457–1490
- Predecessor: New Creation
- Successor: George Leslie
- Born: c. 1406–1417
- Issue: George Leslie; Andrew Leslie; Elizabeth Leslie; John Leslie
- Father: Lord James Leslie

George Leslie, 1st Earl of Rothes (c. 1406/1417 – 1490) was a Scottish nobleman and the first to hold the title of "Earl of Rothes", a hereditary title of the ruler of Leslie, Fife and the lands belonging to the Earl of Rothes.

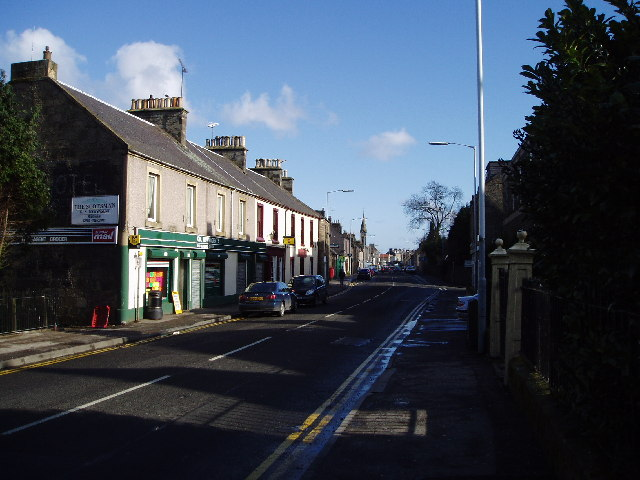
Leslie, Fife where most of George's land was. He was sometimes referred to as Earl of the Leslie lands.

== Family ==
George was the son of Norman Leslie of Fythkill in Fife, and was born sometime between 1406 and 1417. George was the brother of Elizabeth Leslie and father of George Leslie, First Laird of Aikenway; Christian Sinclair, Countess of Orkney; Andrew Leslie, Master of Rothes; Lady Elizabeth Leslie and John Leslie, First Laird of Pitnamoon. He was also the husband of Margaret Lundie, Christina Halyburton and Elizabeth Campbell.

== Lord Leslie and Earl of Rothes ==
George was created Lord Leslie in 1445, and the title of Earl of Rothes was created in 1458 in the Peerage of Scotland for him by James II. He died in 1490 at between 76 and 92 years old at the time; most likely 84.

== Successor ==
Rothes was succeeded by his grandson, also called George Leslie, who ruled as Earl from 1492 to 1509. It is not known why there was a brief interregnum of Earls from 1490 to 1492, also some say James IV prevented him from being Earl until 1492.

Peerage of Scotland
New creation	Earl of Rothes; 1458–1490	Succeeded by George Leslie
