= Leslie House =

Country house in Fife, Scotland

Coordinates: 56.203313°N 3.194881°W

Designations

Inventory of Gardens and Designed Landscapes in Scotland
- Official name: Leslie House
- Designated: 30 March 2005
- Reference no.: GDL00260

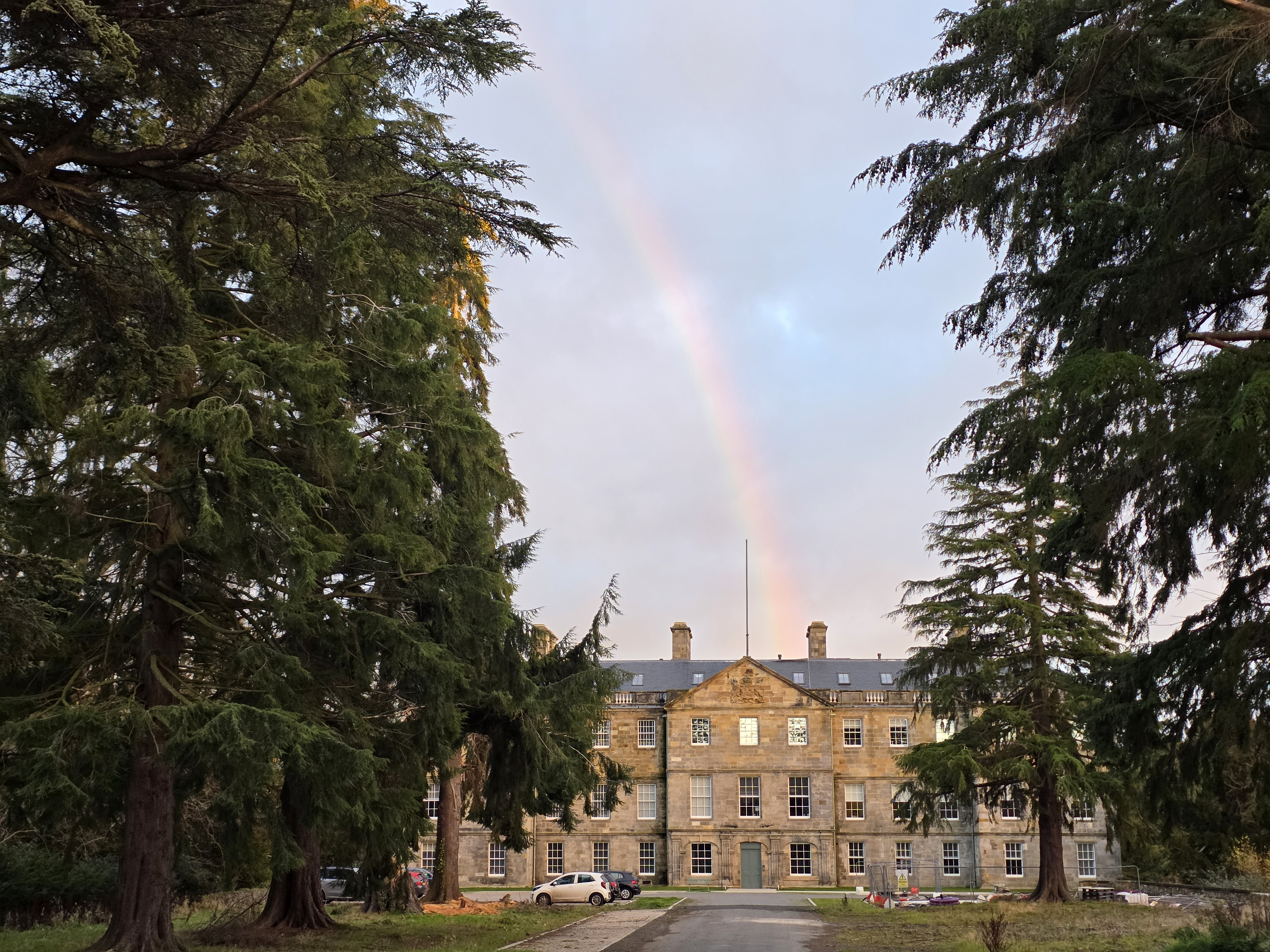
The restored Leslie House seen in late 2025

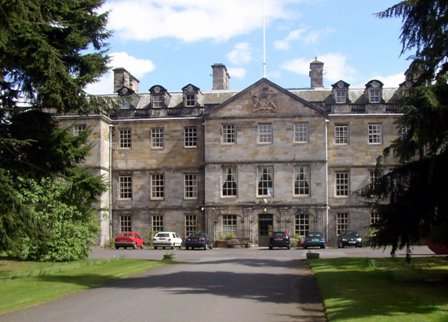
Leslie House in 2007 (prior to the fire in February 2009)

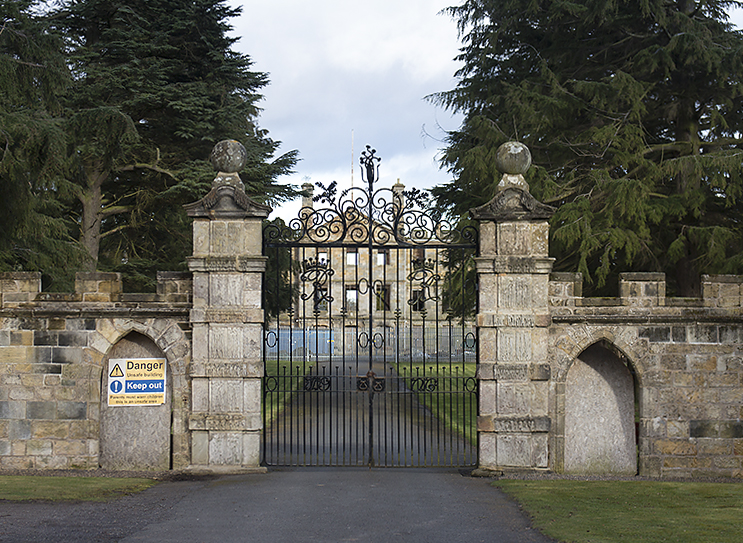
The fire damaged Leslie House in 2015

Leslie House is a Category A listed historic building located in Glenrothes, Fife. It is the largest and earliest Restoration house in Fife, Scotland, and was the seat of the Earls of Rothes for over 250 years. Sir Robert Spencer-Nairn acquired the house in 1919. The house and its associated grounds were formally incorporated into the Glenrothes new town designated area in 1948 and much of the grounds were used to create Riverside Park. In 1952 the main house and its immediate garden grounds were donated by Sir Robert Nairn to the Church of Scotland where it became a care home for the elderly.

The care home was closed and subsequently sold for redevelopment in 2005, however during conversion the building was significantly damaged by a major fire that destroyed the roof and most of the interior. The property was subsequently sold to another developer with restoration work started in 2021 with the property re-occupied by late 2024.

== History ==
It was built for John Leslie, the Duke of Rothes between 1667 and 1674 and this became the seat of the Rothes family. The house which was dubbed Villa De Rothes was the centre of life in the village and once rivalled Holyrood Palace for both size and glamour. A 1667 extension was by a design of William Bruce. The writer Daniel Defoe defined it 'the Glory of the Place, and indeed of the whole Province of Fife'. When a fire destroyed the building in 1763, the north, east and south wings were demolished. Only the west wing was retained and this was reconstructed between 1745 and 1747. From 1904 to 1919, Leslie House was the home of Noëlle, Countess of Rothes, a noted philanthropist who became famous as a heroine of the Titanic disaster in 1912. Shortly after, during World War I the Countess of Rothes converted a wing of Leslie House into a hospital for wounded soldiers invalided from the Front. Her husband, the 19th Earl of Rothes sold Leslie House in 1919 to a Capt. Crundall, who then sold it on to Sir Robert Spencer-Nairn the same year.

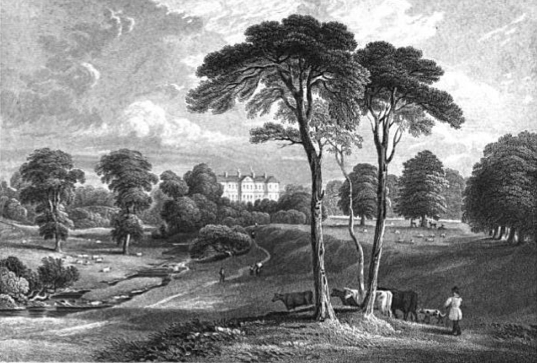
Painting of Leslie House and grounds

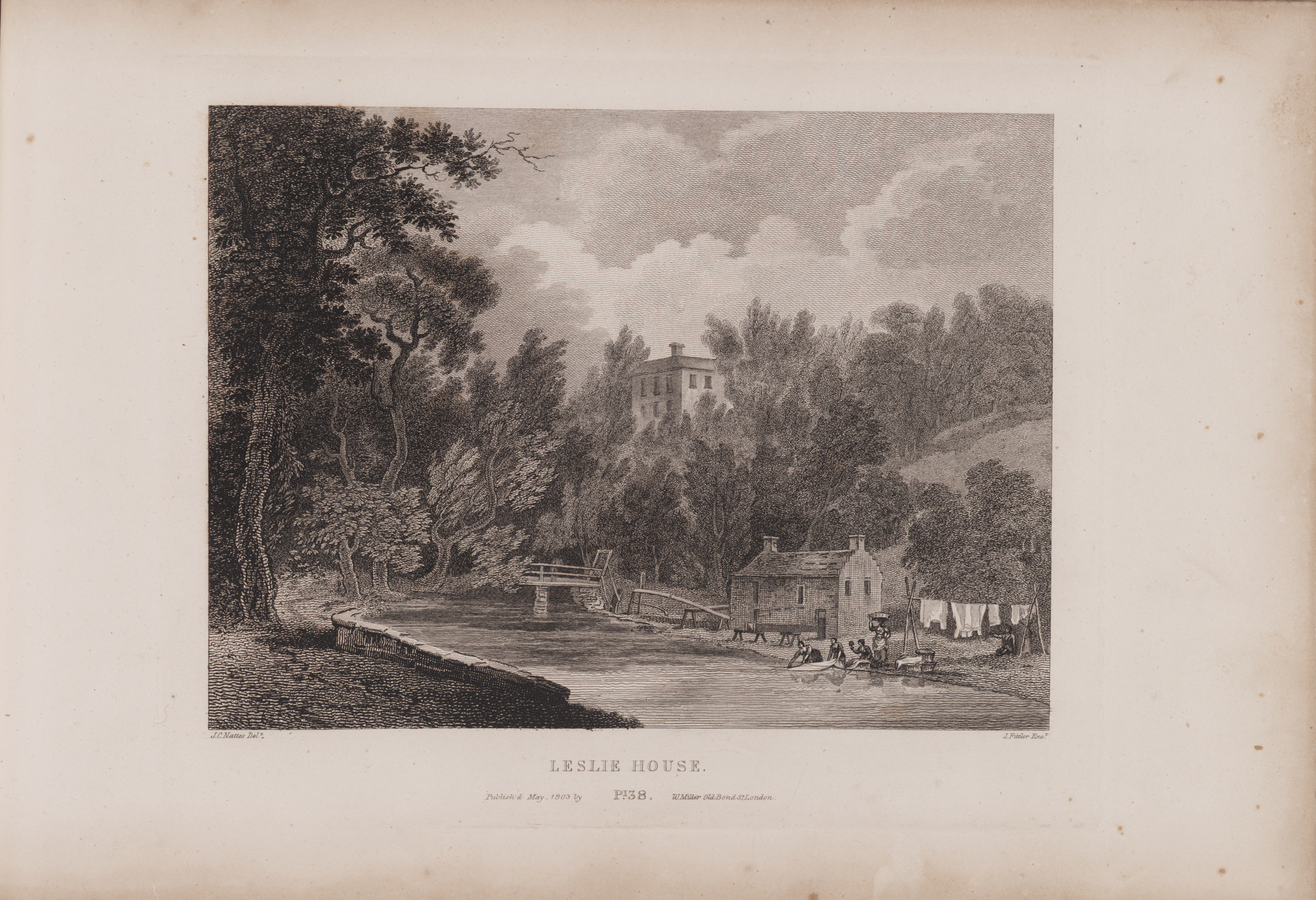
Historic sketching by John Claude Nattes, 1804

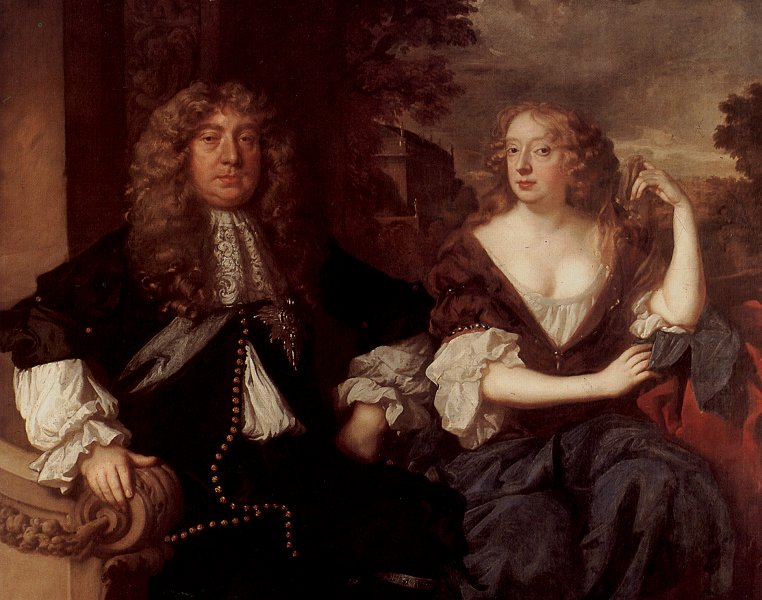
John Maitland, 1st Duke of Lauderdale, and his wife Elizabeth Murry, Duchess of Lauderdale

The house was gifted by the Spencer-Nairn’s to the Church of Scotland after the Second World War, in 1952, for use as a care home, necessitating substantial internal alterations. Prior to this, the house and its associated grounds were incorporated into the allocated area for the delivery of Glenrothes new town by the UK Government in 1948. Much of the land and grounds of Leslie House were used to create Riverside Park.

A developer called Sundial Properties purchased Leslie House in 2005 from the Church of Scotland, planning to convert it into 17 luxury flats, with 12 detached homes within the grounds, but it was again severely damaged by fire in February 2009. In 2017 a second developer, Byzantian Developments, reached an agreement to purchase Leslie House from Sundial Properties and obtained permissions from the Fife Council in 2019 to restore the building into 28 flats, with an enabling development of 8 new build houses in the grounds. The mansion was restored by late 2024 and is now re-occupied.

== Grounds ==
Blackwood (1836) remarked that: "The plantations of Leslie House are remarkably fine. The species that thrive best seem to be ash, elm, common beech, oak, and the silver-fir. The larch does not thrive so well ... The beech avenue at Leslie House is well worthy of attention; the trees are about 200 years old, several of them measuring 16 feet 8 inches, at 4 feet from the ground."

== Architecture and fittings ==
The architecture and fittings were described by Leighton in 1840: "It originally formed a quadrangle, enclosing in the centre an extensive court-yard, but three of the sides were burnt down in December 1763. The fourth side was repaired, and forms the present house. The picture gallery in this part of the building, which is hung with portraits of connections of the family, is three feet longer than the gallery at Holyroodhouse."

Among the several pictures at Leslie House in the mid 19th century mentioned by Leighton, "were those of the fifth Earl and his Countess, by Jamieson, the Duke and Duchess of Rothes, the celebrated Duke of Lauderdale and his Duchess, the Princess of Modena; General John, Earl of Rothes, by Sir Joshua Reynolds; Archbishop Tillotson; and a portrait of Rembrandt by himself." A portrait of the Princess of Modena and a large collection of family portraits are also mentioned.

The house featured several tapestries including, the story of Leander; the history of the children of Israel's journey through the wilderness; and the anointing of Saul. In the mid 19th century, the relics preserved in the house included the dagger with its sheath used by Norman Leslie, master of Rothes, at the murder of Cardinal Bethune; and the sword of State carried by the Duke of Rothes at the coronation of Charles II at Scone.

== Bibliography ==
- Blackwood, William (1836). The New Statistical Account of Scotland (Public domain ed.). William Blackwood & Sons.
- Lamont-Brown, Raymond (2002). Fife in History and Legend. Edinburgh: Birlinn Publishing.
- Leighton, John M.; Stewart, James (1840). History of the County of Fife: From the Earliest Period to the Present Time (Public domain ed.). J. Swan. p. 188.
- Ferguson, Keith (1982). A History of Glenrothes. Glenrothes Development Corporation.
- Glenrothes Development Corporation (1970). Glenrothes – New Town Masterplan Report. Glenrothes: Glenrothes Development Corporation. OCLC 156675029.
