= Hele =

Hele, Hélé, or Hèle may refer to:

== Places ==
in England
in Cornwall

- Hele, Cornwall, a village near Bude, Cornwall

in Devon

- Hele, Devon, a village near Bradninch in Mid Devon
- Hele, North Devon, a village near Ilfracombe
  - Hele Bay
- Hele, Teignbridge, a hamlet near Ashburton
- Hele, Torquay, an area of the town of Torquay
- Hele, Torridge, a hamlet in the far west of Devon
- South Hele, Devon, a hamlet near South Brent
- Croker's Hele, Meeth, an historic estate

in Somerset

- Hele, Somerset, a village near Taunton

in China

- Hele, Hainan, a township-level division in Hainan

- Hele Railway Station, on the Hainan Eastern Ring Railway in Hainan
in Greece

- Hele (Laconia), a town of ancient Laconia

== People ==
as a first name

- Hele Everaus (born 1953), Estonian medical scientist, physician and politician
- Hele Kõrve (born 1980), Estonian actress and singer
- Hele-Mall Pajumägi (born 1938), Estonian badminton player and coach
- Hele Savin (born 1977), Finnish scientist and inventor

as a surname

- Andrew Hele (born 1967), English cricketer
- Doug Hele (1919–2001), English motorcycle engineer
- Elize Hele (1560–1635), English lawyer and philanthropist
- George Hele (1891–1982), Australian cricket umpire
- George de La Hèle (1547–1586), Franco-Flemish composer
- Henry Hele (c. 1688–1778), English physician and land owner
- Ivor Hele (1912–1993), Australian artist
- John Hele (disambiguation), several people
- Pierre Hélé (born 1946), Cameroonian politician
- Sampson Hele (1582–1655), English politician
- Thomas Hele (disambiguation), several people
- Warwick Hele (1568–1626), English politician and landowner

== Other uses ==
- Hele & Co, a firm of English organ-makers between 1865 and 2007
- The Hele baronets, an extinct title in the Baronetage of England
- Hele's School, a secondary school in Plymouth, England
- Hele's School, Exeter, a former boys' grammar school in Devon, England

== See also ==
- Heale
- Heal (disambiguation)
- Heel (disambiguation)
