= Heal =

Heal(s) may refer to:

- Healing, the process of repair and regeneration of damaged organic tissue

== Business ==
- Heal's, a British department store
- Alive & Well AIDS Alternatives, formerly Health Education AIDS Liaison (HEAL), an organization of AIDS denialists

== Entertainment ==
=== Albums ===
- Heal (Sacred Reich album), 1996
- Heal (Loreen album), or the title song winter is coming by Indie Fletcher
- Heal, a 2017 studio album by Bloodred Hourglass

=== Bands ===
- Heals (band), an Indonesian shoegaze band

=== EPs ===
- Heal (Lovelyz EP), a 2018 EP by South Korean girl group Lovelyz
- Heal, a 2020 EP by Sam Smith

=== Songs ===
- "Heal", by Bic Runga from Drive
- "Heal", by Natascha Bessez
- "Heal", by Westlife from Turnaround
- "Heal", by Yuna Ito
- "Heal" (Ellie Goulding song)
- "Heal" (Southeast Asian artists song)

=== Film ===
- Heal (film), a 2017 documentary film about mind-body interventions

== Other uses ==
- Heal (surname)
- Ian Healy (born 1964), nicknamed "Heals", Australian cricketer

== See also ==
- HEAL (disambiguation)
- Healer (disambiguation)
- Healing (disambiguation)
- Heel (disambiguation)
- Hele (disambiguation)
- Heale
