= Heeler (disambiguation) =

Heeler is a type of stock dog or working dog.

Heeler(s) may also refer to:

- Heeler family, a family in the animated television series Bluey
- Ormskirk Heelers, an amateur English rugby league team
- Western Heelers, a former Australian baseball team

== See also ==
- Healer (disambiguation)
- Heel (disambiguation)
