= John Hele =

John Hele may refer to:

- John Hele (died 1661) (1626–1661), English lawyer and politician
- John Hele (died 1605), MP for Plympton Erle
- John Hele (died 1608), MP for Exeter and Plympton Erle
