= Heane =

Heane is a surname. Notable people with this surname include:

- George Heane (1904–1969), English cricket player
- James Heane (1874–1954), Australian colonel
- James Heane (died 1655), English general

== See also ==
- Heale
- Heaney
