= William Strode (1562–1637) =

English military engineer (1562–1637)

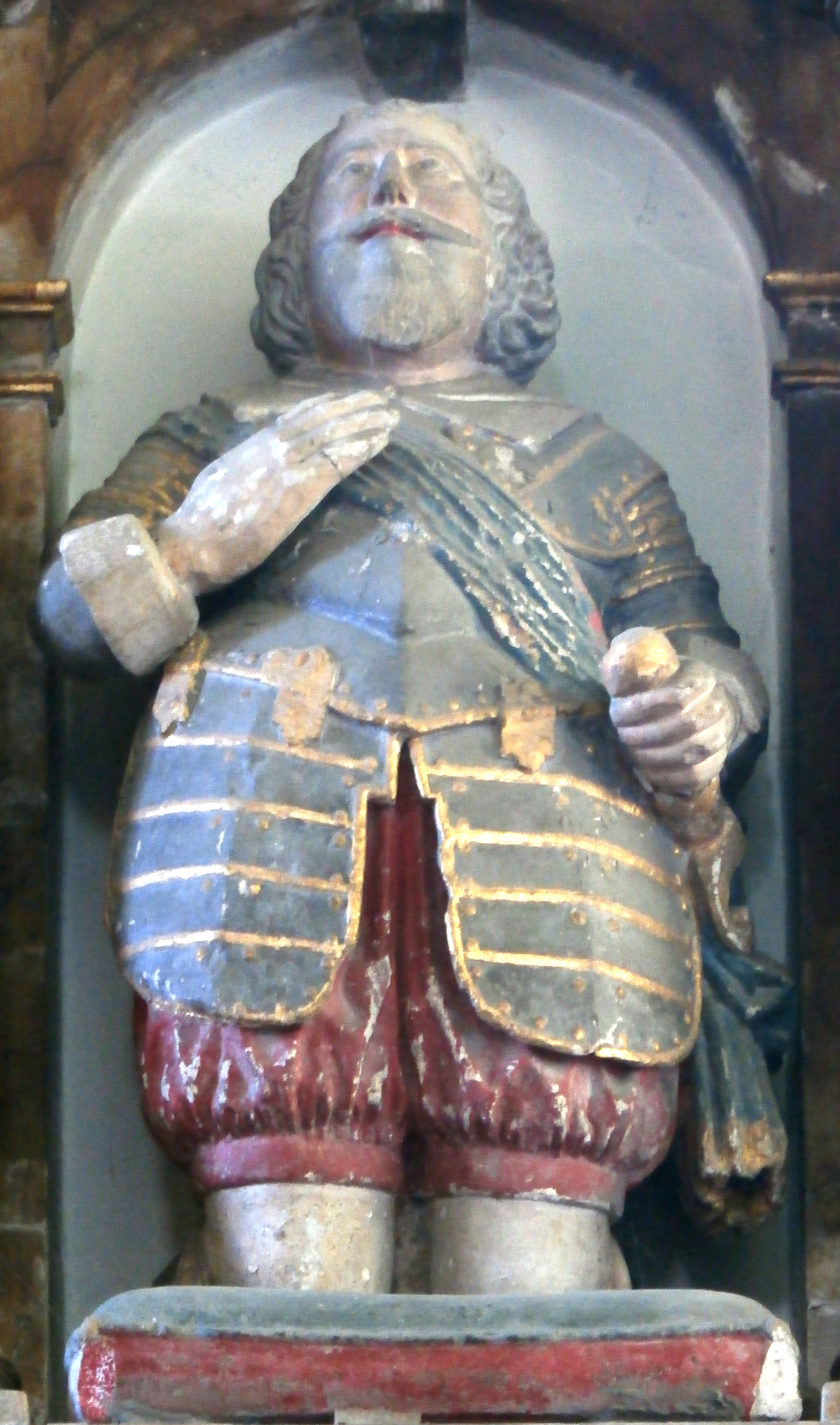
Kneeling effigy of Sir William Strode on his mural monument, St Mary's Church, Plympton

Sir William Strode (1562-1637) of Newnham in the parish of Plympton St Mary, Devon, England, was a member of the Devon landed gentry, a military engineer and seven times a Member of Parliament elected for Devon in 1597 and 1624, for Plympton Erle in 1601, 1604, 1621 and 1625, and for Plymouth in 1614. He was High Sheriff of Devon from 1593 to 1594 and was knighted in 1598. In 1599 he was appointed Deputy Lieutenant of Devon. There is a monument to him in the parish church of Plympton St Mary.

== Biography ==
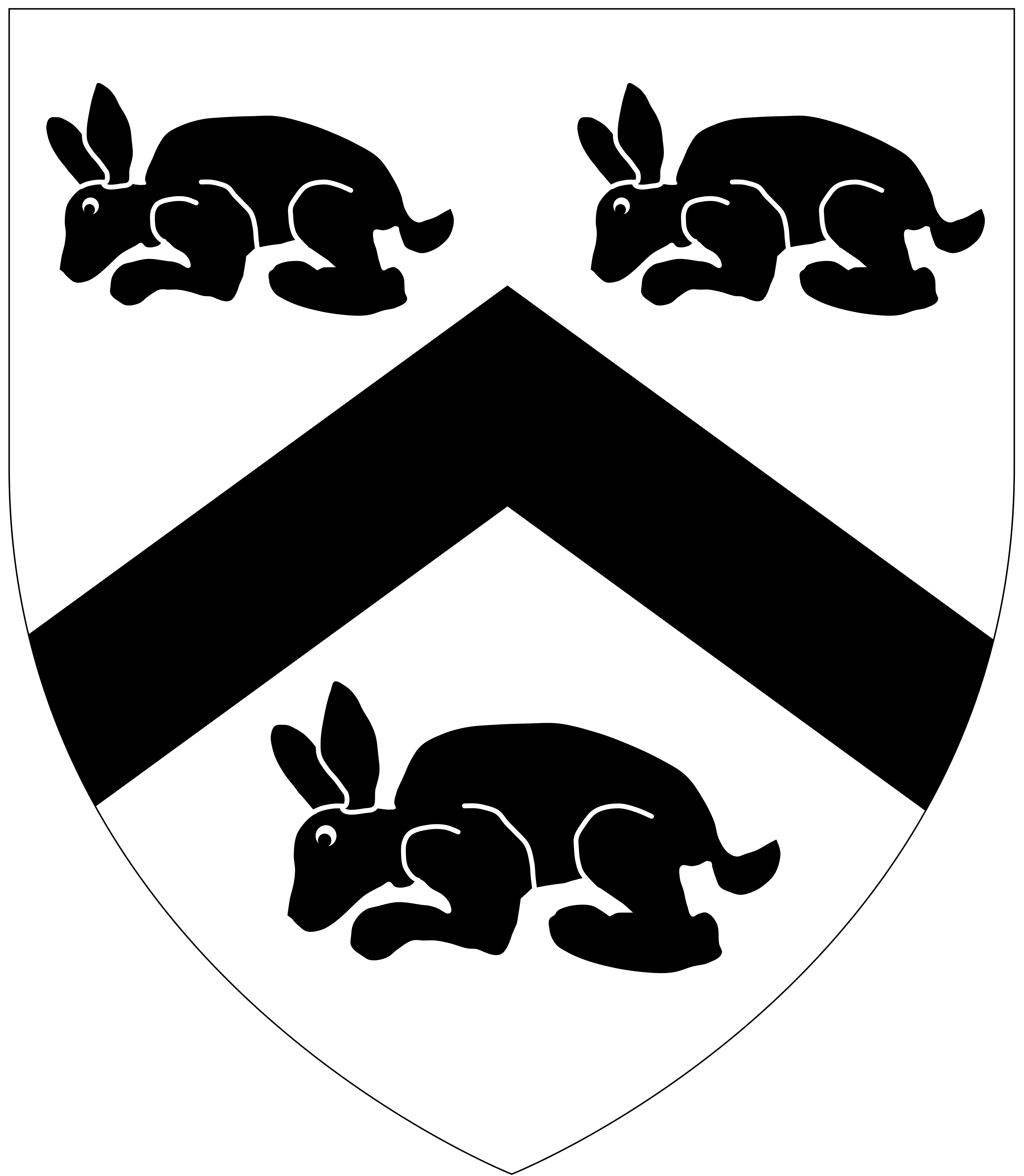
Arms of Strode

Strode was the only son of Richard Strode (died 1581) of Newnham, Plympton St Mary, by his wife Frances Cromwell, first cousin of King Edward VI. Frances was a daughter of Gregory Cromwell, 1st Baron Cromwell (c. 1520 – 1551) (only son of Thomas Cromwell, 1st Earl of Essex (c. 1485 – 1540), chief minister of King Henry VIII) by his wife Elizabeth Seymour, sister of Queen Jane Seymour and sister of Edward Seymour, 1st Duke of Somerset (c. 1500 – 1552) uncle and Lord Protector of King Edward VI.

He entered Inner Temple in 1580 and succeeded to the estates of his father the following year. At the time of the Spanish Armada (1588) he became a colonel of the stannary of Plympton, in command of one hundred men. He was a JP for Devon from about 1592. In 1593 he came into possession of the family tin-mining interests which were previously managed by his uncle, Philip Strode and was appointed High Sheriff of Devon for 1593–94. In 1595 he was in charge of construction works on Plymouth fort. He was a close friend of Admiral Sir Francis Drake (died 1596) and was one of the executors of Drake's will.

In 1597, Strode was elected Member of Parliament for Devon. He was appointed surveyor of the house and castle of Templeton, Devon for life. In 1599 he became Deputy Lieutenant. He was elected MP for Plympton Erle in 1601 and was re-elected for the seat in 1604. In 1606 he was appointed surveyor of Devon for life. He was re-elected MP for Plympton Erle in 1614 and in 1621. In 1624, he was elected MP for Devon. He was elected MP for Plympton Erle again in 1625 and 1626.

As well as Newnham, Strode also had a residence at Meavy, about six miles to the north, which was later the residence of his second son William Strode (1594–1645), MP. His great-grandfather Richard Strode (died 1552) had married Agnes Milliton, daughter of John Milliton of Meavy.

Strode died in 1637 and was buried in the church of St Mary's Plympton, where there is a monument to him (see photograph below). His will was proved in February 1639.

== Marriages and children ==
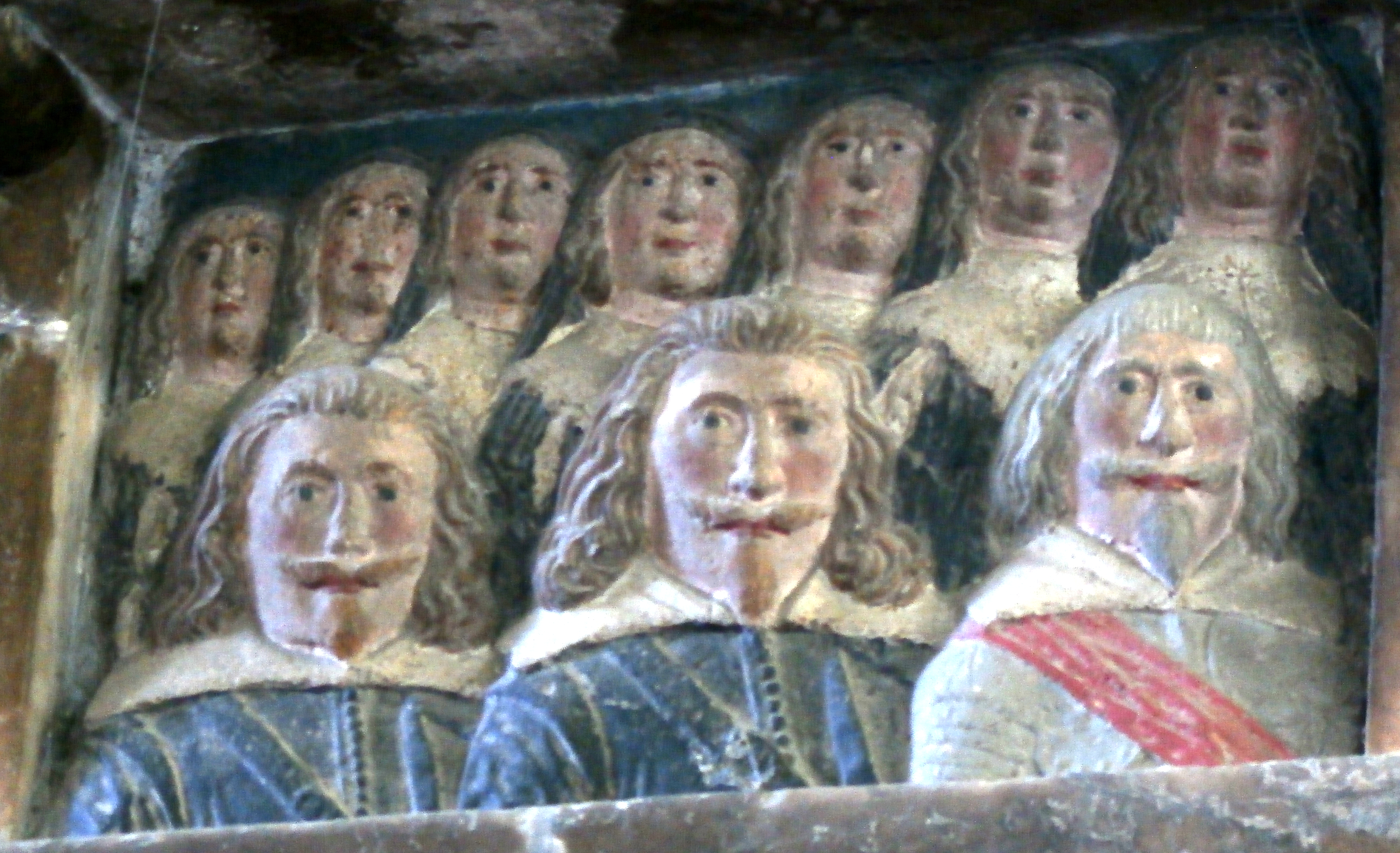
Relief sculpted panel from Strode's monument showing his children

Strode married twice. Firstly in 1581 to Mary Southcote (died 1618) daughter of Thomas Southcote (died 1600), MP, of Bovey Tracey, by whom he had three sons and seven daughters:

- Sir Richard Strode (1584–1669), MP, eldest son and heir.
- William Strode (1594–1645), MP, second son, one of the Five Members whose attempted arrest in the House of Commons of England by King Charles I in 1642 sparked the Civil War.
- John Strode, third son, of Tavistock, who died at some time after 1644.
- Mary Strode (born 1586), eldest daughter, married Sir George Chudleigh, 1st Baronet (1582–1656), of Atherington. She predeceased her husband and was buried in Ashton Church.
- Joanna Strode, second daughter, married in 1615 as his second wife, Sir Francis Drake, 1st Baronet (1588 – c. 1637), of Buckland, nephew of his namesake the great Admiral. She remarried in 1639 at Bere Ferrers (or Buckland Monachorum) to John Trefusis of Milor (or of Trefusis), Cornwall.
- Ursula Strode (died 1635), his third daughter, married Sir John III Chichester (1598–1669), MP, of Hall, Bishop's Tawton. Her mural monument exists in Bishops Tawton Church (see photograph below).
- Frances Strode, fourth daughter, married in 1606/7 to Sir Samuel Somaster, Knight (born 1692), of Painsford, Ashprington.
- Juliana Strode (died 1627), his fifth daughter married Sir John Davie, 1st Baronet (died 1654), of Creedy, Sandford, near Crediton, Devon. A mural monument to her survives in Sandford Church (see photograph below).
- Margaret Strode, sixth daughter, married Sir John Younge of Stetscome.
- Elizabeth Strode, seventh daughter, married Edmond Speccot (died 1620) of Anderdon, Cornwall, second son of Humphrey Speccot, MP, of Speccot, in the parish of Merton, Devon.

Strode's second marriage, in 1624 was to Dunes Glanville (died 1635) daughter of Nicholas Glanville, who was brother to Sir John Glanville (1542–1600). He was her third husband; they had no children.

Monuments to Strode and his daughters
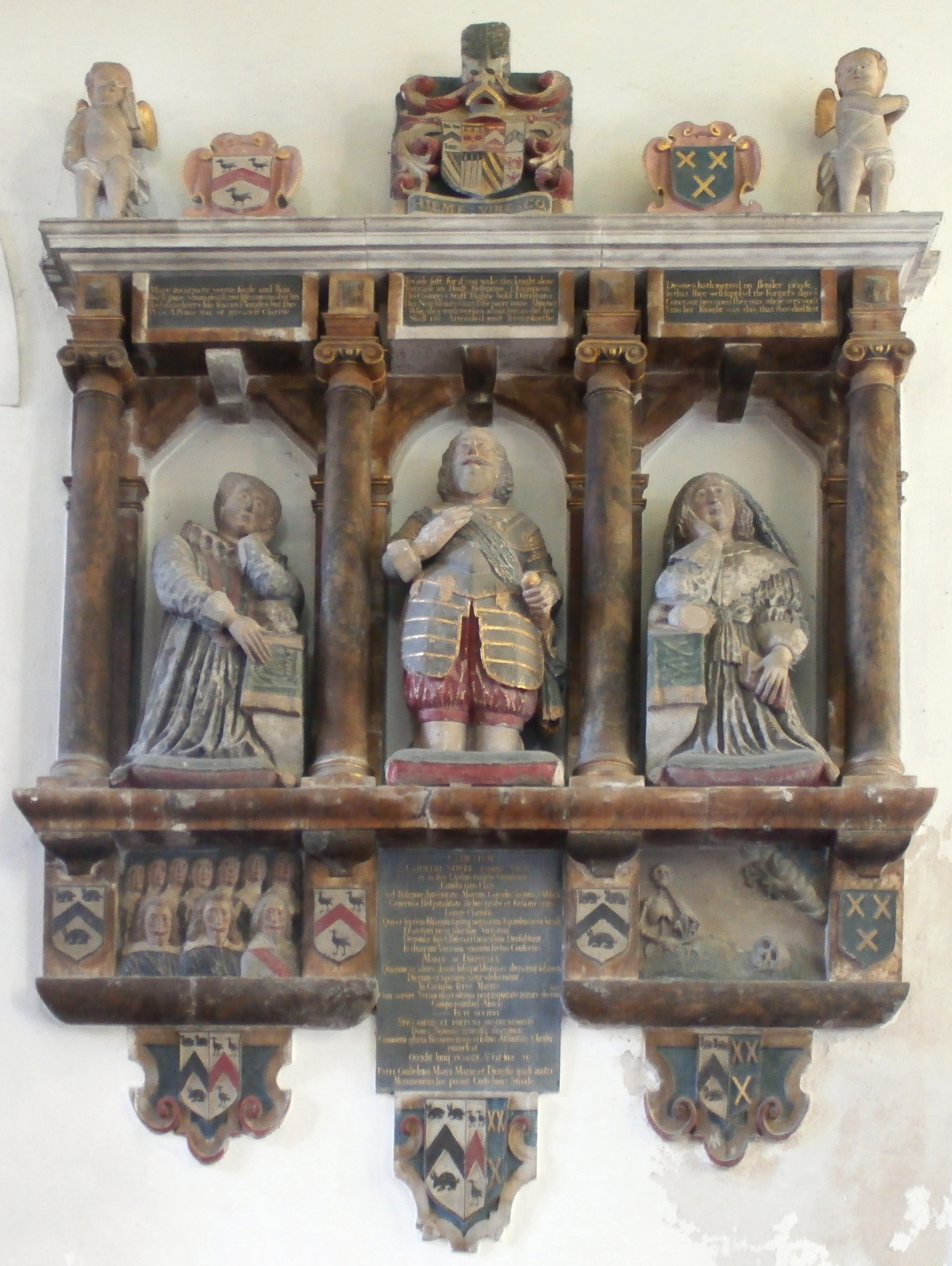
Sir William Strode's mural monument in St Mary's Church, Plympton

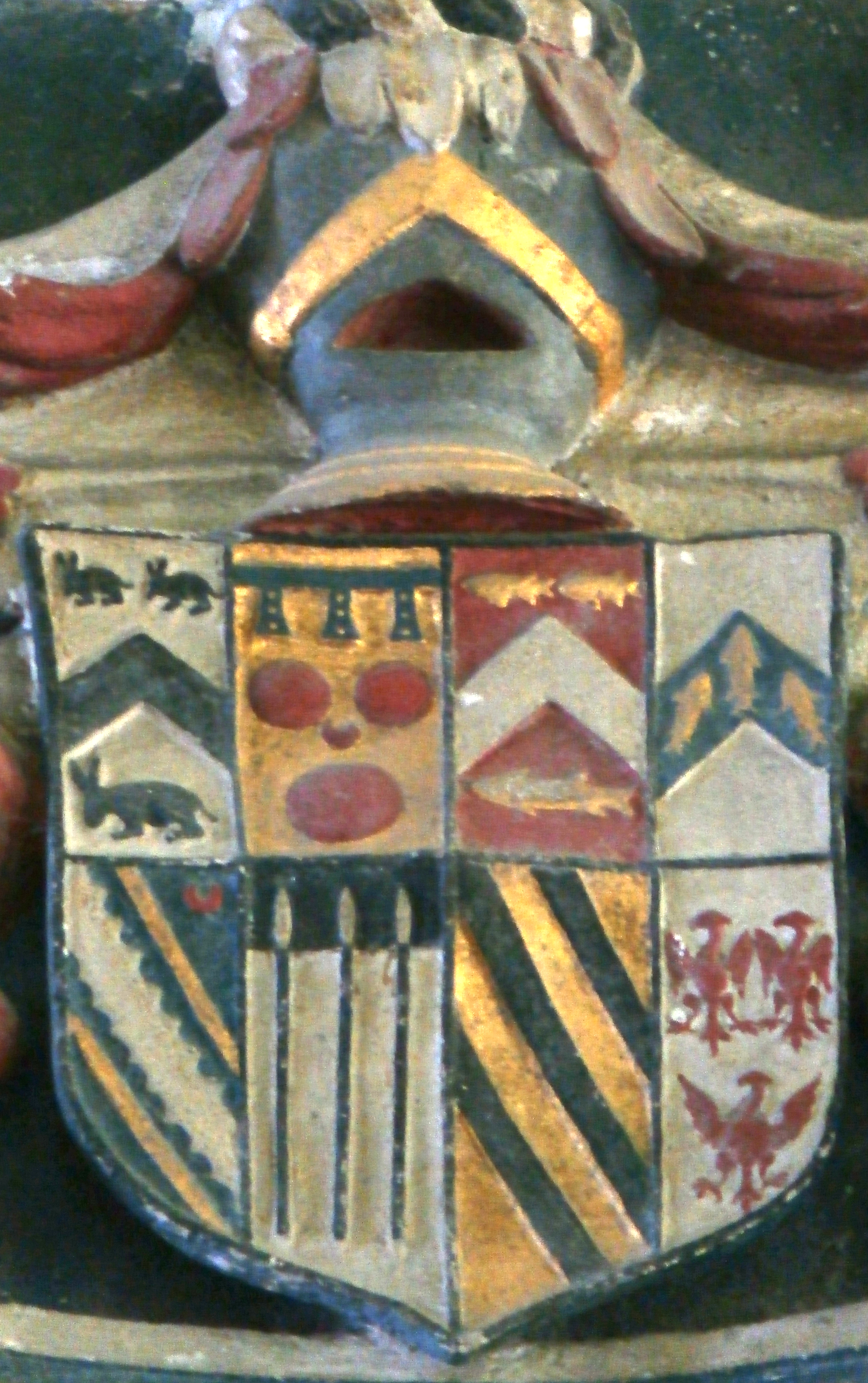
Detail of shield atop Strode's monument showing heraldic quarterings

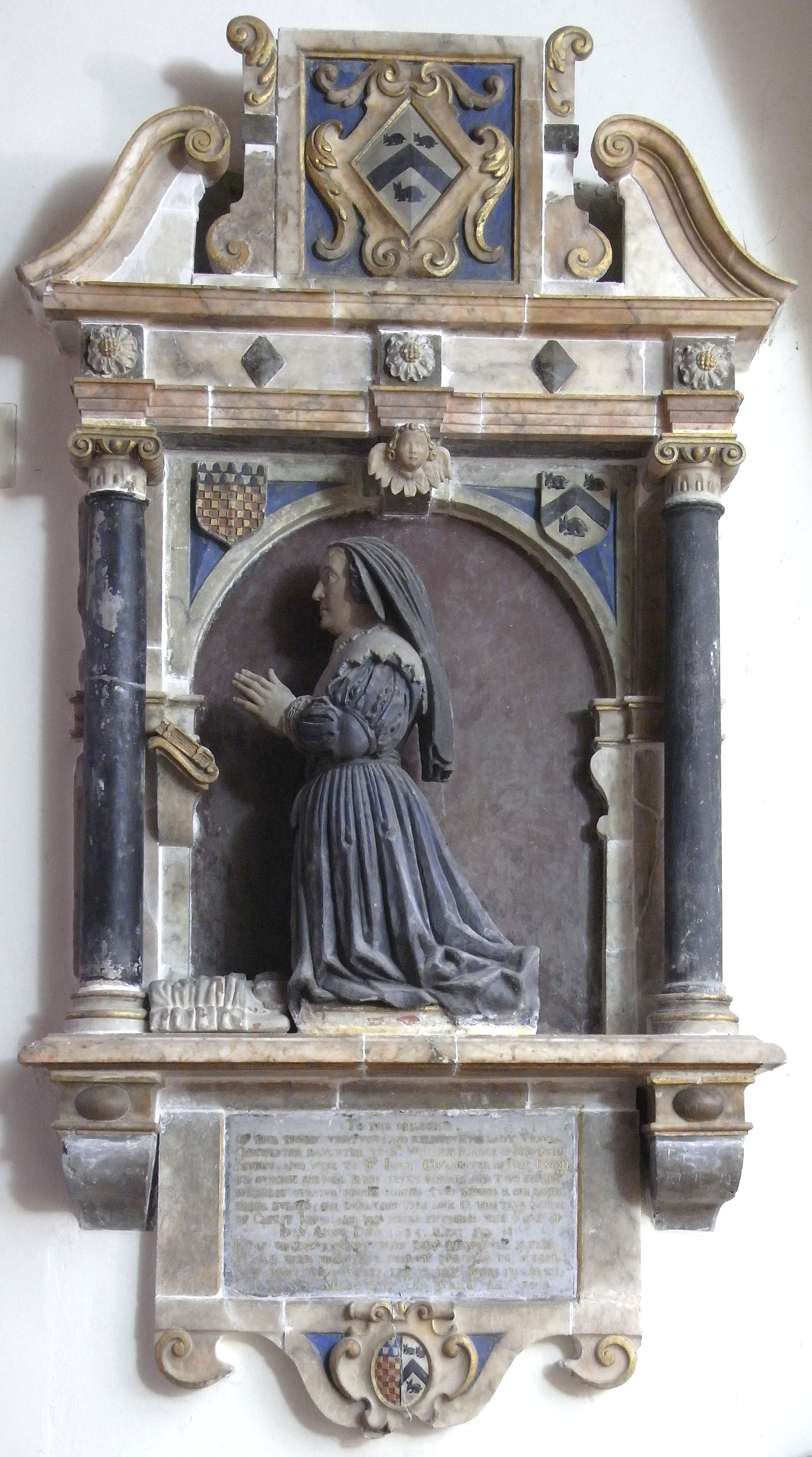
Mural monument to Ursula Strode (d. 1635), Bishop's Tawton Church

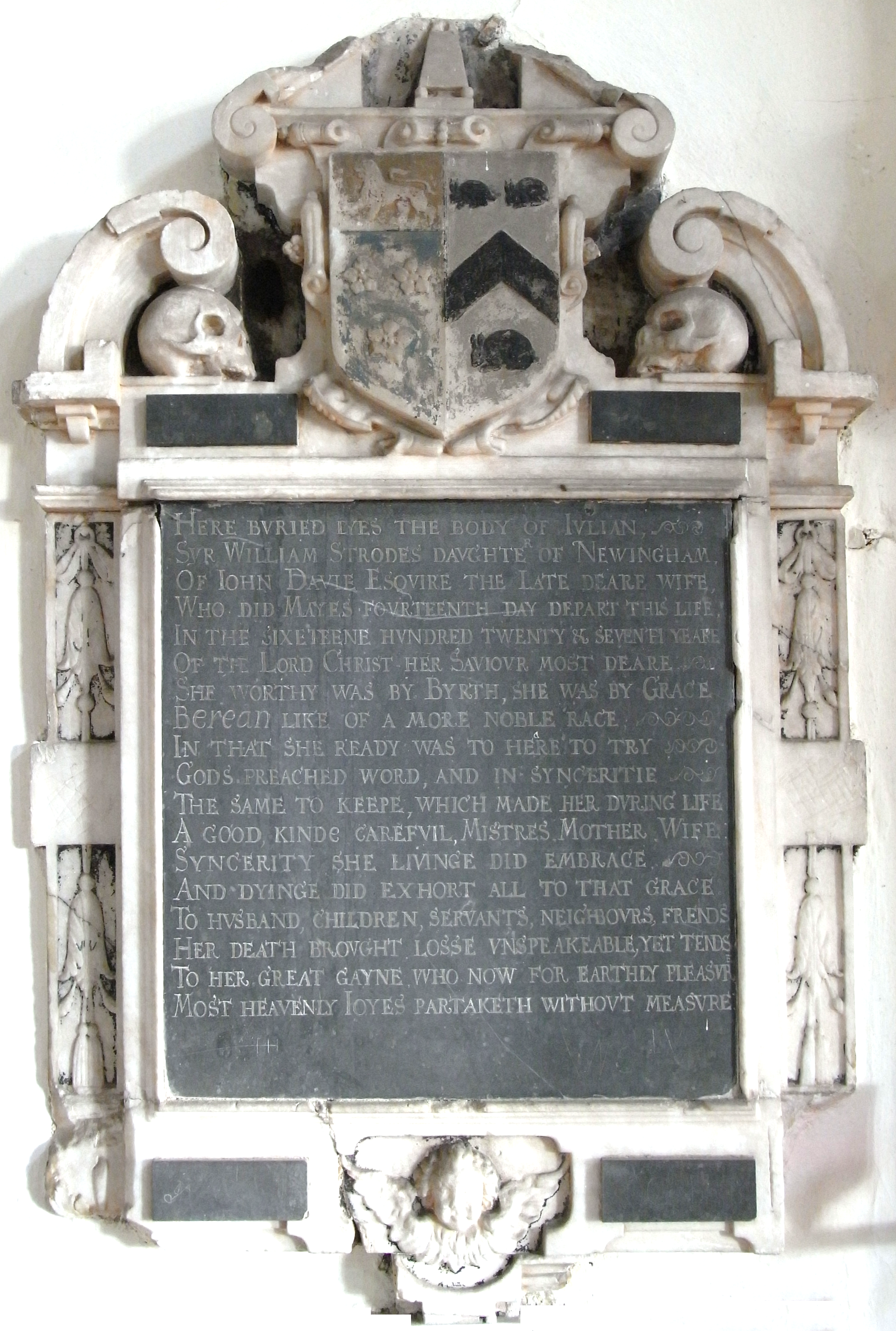
Mural monument to Juliana Strode (d.1627), Sandford Church

== Sources ==
- Hasler, P. W., biography of Sir William Strode published in History of Parliament: House of Commons 1558-1603, ed. P.W. Hasler, 1981
- Risdon, Tristram (died 1640), Survey of Devon. With considerable additions. London, 1811.
- Vivian, John Lambrick (1895). The Visitations of the County of Devon: Comprising the Heralds' Visitations of 1531, 1564 & 1620. Exeter: Henry S. Eland. – pp. 718–720, pedigree of Strode

Parliament of England
Preceded by Thomas Denys; Sir Edward Seymour, 1st Baronet	Member of Parliament for Devon; 1597; With: Amias Bampfield	Succeeded by William Courtenay; Sir Edward Seymour, 1st Baronet
Preceded by George Southcote; Edward Handcock	Member of Parliament for Plympton Erle; 1601–1614; With: John Hele 1601; Sir Henry Beaumont 1604; John Hele 1604–1614	Succeeded by Sampson Hele; Warwick Hele
Preceded by Sampson Hele; Warwick Hele	Member of Parliament for Plympton Erle; 1621–1622; With: Warwick Hele 1614–1622	Succeeded by Sir Francis Drake, 1st Baronet; John Garret
Preceded by John Drake; Sir Edward Seymour, 2nd Baronet	Member of Parliament for Devon; 1624; With: John Drake	Succeeded by Francis Fulford; Francis Courtenay
Preceded by Sir Francis Drake, 1st Baronet; John Garret	Member of Parliament for Plympton Erle; 1625–1626; With: Sir Warwick Hele; Sir Thomas Hele, 1st Baronet 1626	Succeeded by Thomas Hele Bt; Sir James Bragge
