= Healing (disambiguation) =

Healing is the process by which the cells in the body regenerate and repair, as well as the psychological process of dealing with a problem or problems.

Healing may also refer to:

== Films ==
- Healing (1978 film), a Canadian documentary film
- Healing (2014 film), an Australian drama film

== Music ==
=== Albums ===
- Healing (Benny Hinn album), 1998
- Healing (Stevie B album), 1992
- Healing (Todd Rundgren album), 1981
- Healing (Ünloco album), 2001
- Healing (Weird Owl album), 2013

=== Songs ===
- "Healing" (song), 2021 single by Fletcher
- "Healing", a 1986 song by Deniece Williams
- "Healing", a 2021 song by JK-47 and Jay Orient
- "Healing", a song from the 2009 album Between My Head and the Sky by Plastic Ono Band

== Other uses ==
- Alf Healing (1868–1945), Australian rules footballer and company founder
  - A.G. Healing, an Australian manufacturing firm founded by Alf Healing
- Healing, Lincolnshire, England, a village
  - Healing School, a co-educational secondary school and specialist academy in the village

== See also ==
- Heal (disambiguation)
- The Healing (disambiguation)
