= Saint Spyridon =

3rd and 4th-century Cypriot saint

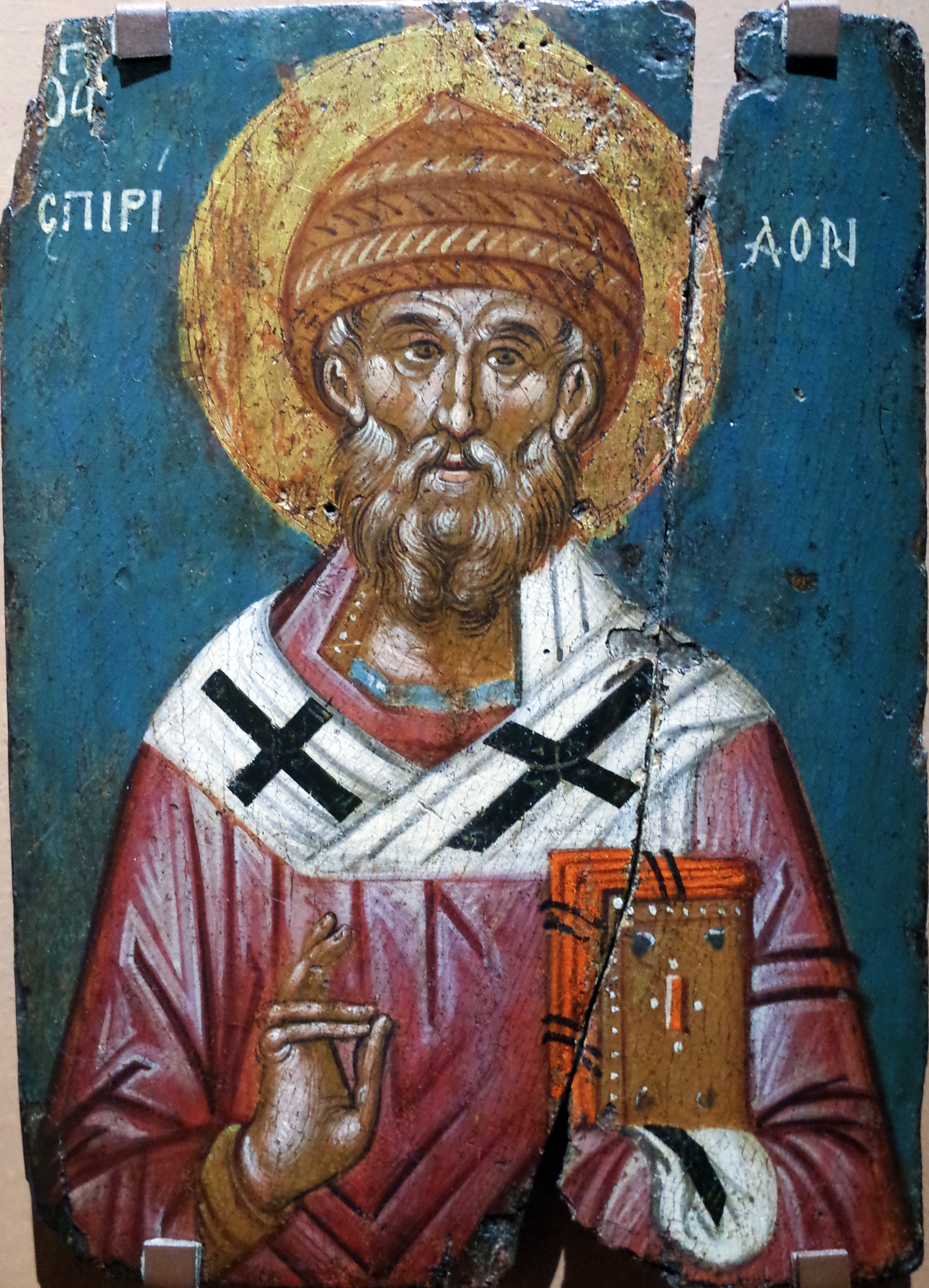
- Icon of Saint Spyridon, 16th century

Wonderworker (Ὁ Θαυματουργός)
- Born: c. 270; Assia, Cyprus, Roman Empire
- Died: c. 348; Trimythous, Cyprus
- Venerated in: Eastern Orthodox Church; Catholic Church; Oriental Orthodox Churches
- Major shrine: Saint Spyridon Church, Corfu
- Feast: December 12 (Eastern Christianity); December 14 (Western Christianity)
- Attributes: Gospel Book, potsherd, sprig of basil, shepherd's hat, nugget of gold, snake, jewelry, goat, golden sword, torch
- Patronage: craftsmen, healers, farmers, Corfu, Piraeus, Cyprus

Spyridon, also Spyridon of Tremithus (Greek: Ἅγιος Σπυρίδων; c. 270 – 348), is a saint honoured in both the Eastern and Western Christian traditions.

== Life ==
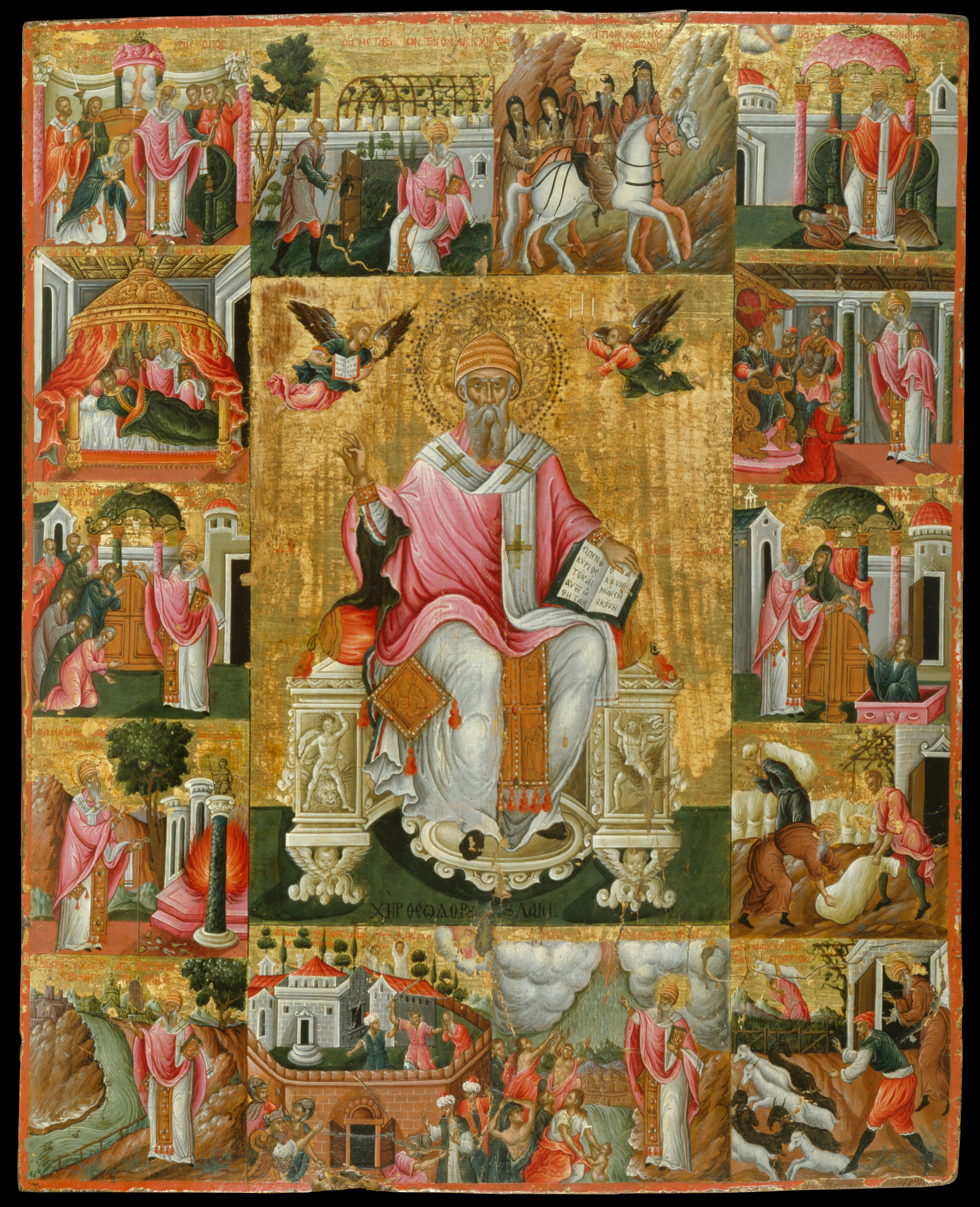
Icon of Saint Spyridon by Theodore Poulakis

Saint Spyridon was born in the village of Assia on the island of Cyprus, traditionally around 270 AD, during the reign of the Roman Empire. He came from a modest rural background and worked as a shepherd in his youth. According to later accounts of his life, he was known from an early age for his piety, simplicity, and generosity toward the poor.

Spyridon married and had a daughter named Irene. His wife is said to have died soon after their marriage, after which Spyridon devoted himself more fully to religious life and the service of the Church. He later entered the clergy and gained recognition among the Christians of Cyprus for his devotion and pastoral care.

At a later stage of his life, Spyridon was elected bishop of Trimythous, an ancient city located near modern-day Famagusta in Cyprus. As bishop, he served a local Christian community during the period when Christianity was undergoing major changes throughout the Roman Empire following the reign of Constantine the Great. Unlike many prominent bishops of the period who came from urban and educated backgrounds, Spyridon was remembered in tradition as a bishop who retained the simplicity of his rural origins.

Spyridon took part in the ecclesiastical affairs of the fourth century and is traditionally counted among the bishops who attended the First Council of Nicaea in 325 AD. At the Council, he entered into a dispute with a Greek philosopher who was defending the Arian heresy. Although the philosopher was said to have been more skilled in rhetoric and philosophical learning, tradition holds that Spyridon succeeded in refuting his arguments through a simple explanation of the Christian faith, leading the philosopher to accept the decisions of the council and embrace Nicene Christianity.

After returning to Cyprus, Spyridon continued to serve as bishop of Trimythous until his death, traditionally placed around 348 AD. He was buried in Cyprus, where his memory continued to be honored by local Christian communities. Over the following centuries, devotion to Spyridon expanded beyond Cyprus and became widespread throughout the Byzantine Empire and the wider Eastern Christian world.

Spyridon was popular in Byzantine literature. A poem, now lost, was dedicated to him by his pupil Triphyllius. It inspired two 7th-century vitae, one by Theodore of Paphos (c. 655) and another possibly by Leontios of Neapolis. The former was used by Symeon the Metaphrast. Arabic and Georgian hagiographies also survive.

=== Miracles ===
According to ecclesiastical tradition, Saint Spyridon performed numerous miracles:

- He was associated with the Prophet Elijah because his prayers were believed to bring rain during periods of drought in Cyprus.
- A friend of Spyridon was falsely accused, imprisoned, and sentenced to death. While hurrying to help him, Spyridon encountered a swollen river. Through his prayers, the waters parted, allowing him and his companions to cross. When the judge learned of the miracle, he repented his error and released the innocent man.
- One night, when the oil in Spyridon's lamp was nearly exhausted and the flame was about to go out, he prayed, and the lamp was miraculously replenished with oil.
- He healed Emperor Constantius II when he was gravely ill and near death.
- A woman brought her dead child to Spyridon and begged him for help. After he prayed, the child was restored to life. Overcome by the miracle, the mother collapsed and died, but Spyridon prayed once more and restored her to life as well.
- Following the death of his daughter Irene, a woman approached Spyridon concerning valuable jewelry she had entrusted to Irene for safekeeping. Unable to locate the valuables, he went to Irene's tomb and asked where they had been hidden. Irene answered from the grave and revealed their location, allowing the jewelry to be recovered and returned to its owner.
- When a council was convened in Alexandria in 340, all the city's pagan idols reportedly collapsed through the prayers of the assembled bishops except for one. According to the account, the Patriarch received a vision revealing that the remaining idol would fall only upon Spyridon's arrival. When he reached Alexandria, the idol and its altars immediately collapsed.
- God revealed to Spyridon the time of his death, and he died while at prayer.

== Veneration ==
=== Patronage ===
Spyridon is the patron saint of potters and of the island of Corfu where he is called "Αγιος Σπυρίδων ο πολιούχος", "Saint Spyridon, the Keeper of the City", for the miracle of expelling the plague (πανώλη or πανούκλα) from the island. He is also the patron saint of Piraeus where he is celebrated and honored every year on December 12.

==== Corfu ====
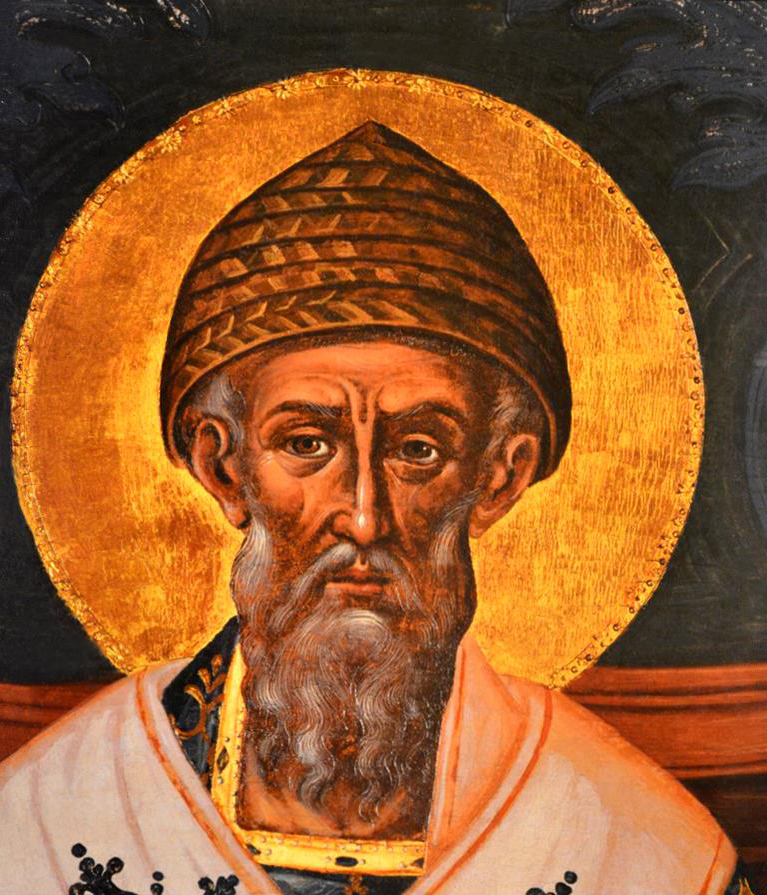
Fresco of Saint Spyridon in Corfu, by Spyridon Sperantzas

It is believed by the faithful that the plague, on its way out of the island, scratched one of the fortification stones of the old citadel (Palaio Frourio) to indicate its fury for being expelled. This scratch is still shown to visitors.

Spyridon is also believed to have saved the island at the 1716 siege of Corfu. At that time the Turkish army and naval force led by Sultan Ahmed III appeared in Butrint opposite Corfu.

On July 8 the Turkish fleet carrying 33,000 men sailed to Corfu from Butrint and established a beachhead in Ipsos the same day the Venetian fleet encountered the Turkish fleet off the channel of Corfu and defeated it in the ensuing naval battle. On July 19 the Turkish army reached the hills of the town and laid siege to the city. After repeated failed attempts and heavy fighting, the Turks were forced to raise the siege which had lasted twenty-two days.

There were also rumors spreading among the Turks that some of their soldiers saw Spyridon as a monk threatening them with a lit torch and that helped increase their panic. This victory over the Ottomans, therefore, was attributed not only to the leadership of Count Schulenburg who commanded the stubborn defense of the island against the Ottomans but also to the miraculous intervention of Spyridon.

After the victorious outcome of the battle, Venice honored Schulenburg and the Corfiotes for successfully defending the island. The great composer Vivaldi was commissioned to write an oratorio, Juditha triumphans, in celebration of the victory.

==== Other ====
Spyridon is also the patron saint of the Tolstoy family. Andrei Tolstoy (fl. 15th century) chose Spyridon as the family's saint and he remains so in both branches. The Grand Prince of Muscovy Vasily II (1425–1462) apparently gave a gold cross containing relics of Spyridon to Andrei. This reliquary survives and is held by Nikolai Tolstoy.

=== Feast day ===
Recognizing Spyridon's role in the defense of the island, Venice established the annual "Litany of St. Spyridon" on August 11 to commemorate the event. His feast day is celebrated in the East on the Saturday before Great Lent (known as "Cheesefare Saturday") and on December 12. In Eastern Churches that follow the traditional Julian Calendar, December 12 corresponds to December 25 in the modern Gregorian Calendar. In Western Christianity, he is commemorated on December 14.

== Relics ==
In the 650s, when the Arabs took Cyprus, Spyridon's body was disinterred and taken to Constantinople. The relics were found to be incorrupt, and contained a sprig of basil, the "royal plant," both of which were taken as a sign of divine confirmation of his sanctity.

When Constantinople fell to the Ottomans in 1453, Spyridon's relics were removed again. This time, they were taken to the island of Corfu by a Corfiote monk called Kalohairetis (Καλοχαιρέτης), where they remain to this day, in Saint Spyridon Church.

The relics are taken in procession every Palm Sunday and on other special occasions, for veneration by the faithful. All Philharmonics of Corfu, including the Philharmonic Society of Corfu, take part in these ceremonial events. The relic of his right hand was located in Rome in the Church of Santa Maria in Vallicella, to which it was given by Pope Clement VIII to Cardinal Cesare of Baronio of the Oratory of Saint Philip Neri. There it remained until 1986 when the right arm of Spyridon was brought back to Corfu.
