= Sir Francis Drake, 1st Baronet =

English politician

Sir Francis Drake, 1st Baronet (1588 – 11 March 1637) was an English politician who sat in the House of Commons in two parliaments between 1625 and 1629.

Drake was the son of Thomas Drake of Buckland Abbey, Devon and his wife, Elizabeth Gregory, widow of John Elford. His father was the brother of Sir Francis Drake and accompanied him in his sea adventures. He was baptised at Buckland Monachorum on 16 September 1588. He matriculated at Exeter College, Oxford on 23 November 1604, aged 15, and was of Lincoln's Inn in 1606.

In 1622, King James sought to make up the money denied him by parliament, by seeking voluntary contributions from the gentry and the petty nobility. Following this, Drake was created baronet on 2 August 1622.

In 1624, Drake was elected Member of Parliament for Plympton Erle. He was elected MP for Devon in 1628 and sat until 1629 when King Charles decided to rule without parliament for eleven years. He was High Sheriff of Devon in 1633.

In 1628, he compiled the first detailed account of his uncle's circumnavigation, The World Encompassed by Sir Francis Drake, based on his uncle's journal, the notes of Francis Fletcher, and other sources.

Drake married, firstly, to Jane Bampfield, who died in 1613, and secondly, to Joan Stroud, daughter of Sir William Stroud of Newnham. His son, Francis, succeeded to the baronetcy.

Parliament of England
Preceded by Sir William Strode; Sir Warwick Hele	Member of Parliament for Plympton Erle; 1624; With: John Garret	Succeeded by Sir Warwick Hele; Sir William Strode
Preceded by John Drake; John Pole	Member of Parliament for Devon; 1628–1629; With: John Bampfield	Parliament suspended until 1640
Baronetage of England
New creation	Baronet (of Buckland); 1622–1637	Succeeded by Francis Drake
