= Heal (film) =

2017 American documentary film

- Film poster
- Directed by: Kelly Noonan-Gores
- Written by: Kelly Noonan-Gores
- Produced by: Adam Schomer; Richell Morrissey
- Starring: Deepak Chopra; Joseph Dispenza; Gregg Braden; Marianne Williamson; Kelly Turner; Michael Beckwith; Peter Crone; Bruce Lipton; David Hamilton; Anthony William; Patti Penn; Dianne Porchia; Kelly Brogan; Anita Moorjani
- Cinematography: Christopher Gallo
- Edited by: Tina Mascara
- Music by: Michael Mollura
- Release date: June 1, 2017 (Illuminate Film Festival)
- Running time: 106 minutes
- Country: United States
- Language: English
- Box office: $12,668

Heal is a 2017 documentary film that was written and directed by Kelly Noonan-Gores and produced by Richell Morrissey and Adam Schomer. The film focuses on mind–body interventions and follows several individuals who used these techniques after being diagnosed with a fatal disease. It was reviewed by critics as an "infomercial" that makes some valid points while it pretends to be based on science, yet some believe it promotes pseudoscience.

== Synopsis ==
Heal begins with an opening monologue from Noonan-Gores in which the director states her concerns about the growing cases of disease due to the toxicity of the environment and food people consume. Noonan-Gores then transitions to gathering testimonials from those who have experienced mind-body medicine.

Chiropractor Joe Dispenza describes his experience when he was hit by a car during a triathlon. He declined surgery and says he recovered by reconstructing his spine in his mind, and that his recovery led him to conduct research on mind-body medicine.

Elizabeth Craig details her healthy, yet stressful life. Craig worked with Dianne Porchia, spiritual therapist and holistic mind-body-heart-soul stress reduction facilitator throughout her journey with cancer. Craig noticed something was physiologically wrong when she started developing frequent headaches and nausea. Doctors eventually diagnosed her with stage four colorectal cancer. Several scientists and mind-body practitioners discuss the role of stress in the modern age and its physiological effects. in the movie Craig says, "It's the mind that gets in the way of healing."

Next Eva Lee describes the appearances of skin rashes and boils throughout her body. Doctors diagnosed her with an unspecified autoimmune disease; she sought an alternative to medications. Bruce Lipton and David Hamilton then discuss quantum physics and chemistry applied to mind-body healing.

The fourth person to be introduced is Anita Moorjani, who describes her experience with lymphoma. She believes that fear is the cause of her cancer and says her tumors dissolved within five weeks. Kelly Turner, who holds a Ph.D in social welfare, discusses her research on radical remissions. Kelly Brogan briefly discusses her experience in seeking alternative medicine as a way to circumvent taking medications for the rest of her life. Michael Beckwith weighs in with his views on pharmaceuticals. Bruce Lipton and Deepak Chopra express their concerns with prescription drug use for chronic illnesses. Anthony William describes his role in assessing patients and the importance of diet in treating chronic illnesses.

David Hamilton describes his role as an organic chemist and the effects of a placebo. Bruce Lipton, Joe Dispenza, Deepak Chopra, Michael Beckwith, and Kelly Turner comment about the nature of prognosis. Elizabeth Craig is later seen explaining her reasons for seeking treatment in addition to chemotherapy. She eventually starts seeing Dianne Porchia, a spiritual psychologist, to help her get rid of her fear of death. Bruce Lipton, Joan Borysenko, Gregg Braden, and Darren Weissman discuss stem cells, genetics and the role of the environment on one's health. The film then refocuses on Eva Lee, who is in a therapy session with Patti Penn, a Reiki master and Emotional Freedom Technique practitioner. Several individuals discuss the supposed roles of past trauma and stress on physical ailments. This is followed by commentary on the pharmaceutical industry.

Jeffrey Thompson is shown discussing the nature of the nervous system and how he uses sound waves to activate Eva Lee's parasympathetic nervous system. Noonan-Gores, Joan Borysenko, Marianne Williamson, Deepak Chopra, and Kelly Turner discuss the role of meditation in relieving stress and activating the parasympathetic nervous system. Gregg Bradden then asserts that prayer and thoughts of love work in combating illness by incorporating quantum entanglement and the Big Bang.

The film concludes with Elizabeth Craig becoming cancer-free and provides commentary about societal conventions about western medicine.

== Release ==
Heal premiered on June 1, 2017 at the Illuminate Film Festival in Sedona, Arizona. It also aired as part of the Maui Film Festival where it earned the Soul in Cinema Award. It went on to show at different universities and organizations, including California State University, San Bernardino in Palm Desert, California and at High Point University in High Point, North Carolina.

In February 2019, the film was added to Netflix.

== Reception ==
Heal has received criticism by reviewers for using individuals to produce an "informercial" and promoting pseudoscience. John Defore wrote in The Hollywood Reporter that "the general theme is a belief that most modern pharmaceuticals and the doctors who rely on them are ineffective at best, harmful at worst", and that the film does not have a good command of science. He states that viewers interested in the topic of alternative medicine should seek films with a narrower scope. He describes the directing as "committing the usual newbie-docmaker sin of framing this fact-gathering exercise as her personal journey", adding that "Noonan doubles down in sometimes silly ways". He writes that "Noonan isn't interested in talking to skeptics or critics, but her team of alt-medicine believers does include some with conventional qualifications."

Writing for Slate Magazine, Marc Siegel stated that the movie "spends hardly any time exploring the scientific underpinnings of the miraculous cures it highlights, or why they frequently fail for others". Siegel writes that the film makes some valid points, but that it "goes too far".

The Los Angeles Times reported that the movie "appears closer to a feature-length infomercial than a legitimate documentary" and that the director had made "odd choices that distract from her message".

Substream Magazine describes the film as a "snake oil salesperson" using "junk science". Leigh Monson wrote that the film pushes an agenda by leading viewers to falsely hope for better outcomes based on wishful thinking. Monson states that the film covers "some decent points about how the Western healthcare system is primarily focused on treating diseases instead of finding root causes", but "pretends to base its assertions on scientific findings, but in reality it only uses scientific terminology to lend credence to its wholly unsupported claims".
