= The Healing =

The Healing may refer to:

- The Healing (album), by Strange Fruit Project, 2006
- The Healing (film), a 2012 Filipino horror suspense film
- "The Healing" (song), by Blanca and Dante Bowe, 2022
- The Healing (sr), a 2014 Serbian film by Ivan Jovic
- The Healing | Horror game

== See also ==
- Healing (disambiguation)
