= Anthony William =

Self-proclaimed medium offering pseudoscientific medical advice

- Born: Anthony William Coviello
- Occupation: Self-described medium
- Spouse: Rachel Schutzman
- Website: medicalmedium.com

Anthony William Coviello, known professionally as Anthony William or the Medical Medium, is a self-proclaimed medium who offers pseudoscientific health advice based on alleged communication with a spirit. He authors books and offers advice online on forums such as Gwyneth Paltrow's Goop column and his own website. William believes that the Epstein-Barr virus is responsible for multiple ailments, including cancer. He claims to be the originator of the lemon juice in water morning detox as well as celery juicing, which he claims can offer many health benefits. Critics allege that he is practicing medicine without a license and that he has, at times, improperly solicited positive Amazon reviews for his books.

== Early life ==
William has described that he first received his expertise through a connection to "Spirit" when he was four years old. He claims that he correctly diagnosed his grandmother with lung cancer, and often healed family and friends throughout his childhood.

William began promoting supplements and herbs for health in 1985. He also studied cooking, nutrition, and herbalism. In 2000, William and his wife Rachel Schutzman opened a health food store in Machias, Maine called Earth Organic Market.

== Career ==
William uses the title "Medical Medium". He has published 8 books, and has been on the New York Times Best Seller list. He is a writer for Gwyneth Paltrow's Goop, for which he is considered a "trusted expert." He has nearly 3 million followers on Instagram as of 2021 and has 3.5 million followers on Facebook as of 2021.

His website contains at least 177 revenue-generating affiliate links to Amazon products, such as nutritional supplements. According to the legal disclaimers on his site as well as on his Goop articles, William has no certifications of scientific or medical training. He has also published a disclaimer saying that his suggestions should not be a substitute for medical advice. He has frequently been solicited by the traditional press for comments, but appears to infrequently engage with journalists.

== Claims and practice ==
=== Psychic connection and angels ===
William states that his connection to Spirit presents itself as a voice outside of his head, next to his right ear. He claims that his connection to Spirit gives him the ability to scan bodies in a way that can diagnose all blockages, infections, trouble areas, past problems, and even soul fractures with knowledge that comes from Spirit. He claims that this assists in his self-professed ability to diagnose other people of various illnesses as well as offer treatment.

In his book Life-Changing Foods, there is a chapter dedicated to angels. He explains that he believes in the existence of twelve different angels, with names such as the Angel of Abundance and the Angel of Addiction. He encourages his followers to invoke the names of specific angels to ask for help in various circumstances.

=== Cancer and Epstein-Barr virus ===
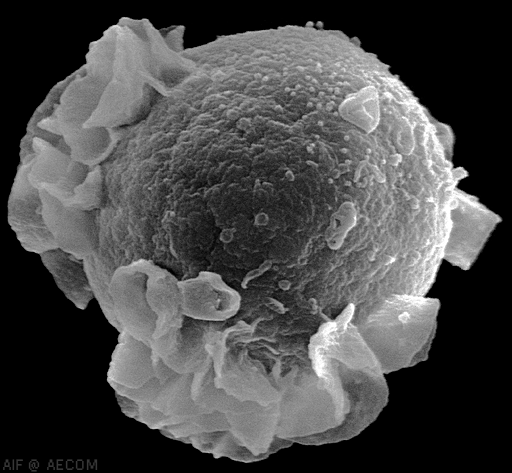
Epstein-Barr virus

One of the health issues that William most frequently claims to diagnose is chronic disease that supposedly occurs from the Epstein–Barr virus, for which he prescribes an unproven treatment of B12 vitamins that Spirit recommends, along with high doses of celery juice. He asserts that the virus can be transmitted in utero. Current scientific evidence suggests that it is most often transmitted via saliva.

William says, in his Goop column, that "ninety-eight percent of the time, cancer is caused by a virus and at least one type of toxin." He attributes many cancers to the Epstein-Barr virus, and claims that this virus is "responsible for breast cancer, liver cancer, almost all lung cancer, pancreatic cancer, colon cancer, prostate cancer, women's reproductive cancers, leukemia, and many more." William claims that the cancers of today have developed only recently, specifically since the Industrial Revolution. He also contends that cancer as a whole has no genetic component, despite scientific evidence to the contrary. William also suggests that the Epstein-Barr virus causes over 95% of thyroid issues, although no current scientific evidence supports this view.

According to the CDC, there is no current peer-reviewed scientific evidence to support William's assertions that the Epstein-Barr virus causes lung cancer. The American Cancer Society has noted that the Epstein-Barr virus might possibly be linked to Hodgkin's lymphoma or certain stomach cancers, but this is still undetermined.

=== Food and diet ===
In his book, Life Changing Foods, he considers "fruits, vegetables, herbs and spices, and wild foods" to be the “Holy Four.” He states:

Because they grow from the earth and are showered by the sun and sky, enduring out in the elements day after day as they form, they are intimately connected to the holy forces of nature. They don't just contain the building-block nutrients we need to function. They contain intelligence from the Earthly Mother and the heavens that we desperately need about how to adapt.

Against these “Holy Four” he positions the “Unforgiving Four,” which are radiation, toxic heavy metals, the “viral explosion,” and DDT. He claims that the “Unforgiving Four” "ravage our bodies, make us question our own sanity, and push us to the breaking point as a society."

William says that there are two kinds of “Living Water.” According to William, "hydrobioactive water" is found in all of the “Holy Four” foods and can hydrate a person more than tap water. He also suggests, without evidence, that there is a cofactor in water which "contains information to help restore your soul and spirit and to support your emotions."

He also describes six foods which he considers to be “life-challenging.” He contends that dairy “bogs down the liver”; eggs “feed the viral explosion”; corn is no longer nutritious due to overuse of genetic modification; wheat feeds pathogens; canola oil destroys the lining of the stomach, veins, and heart; and that food additives described or labeled as "natural flavors" are actually a neurotoxin called MSG which destroy brain and nerve cells over time.

=== Celery juice ===
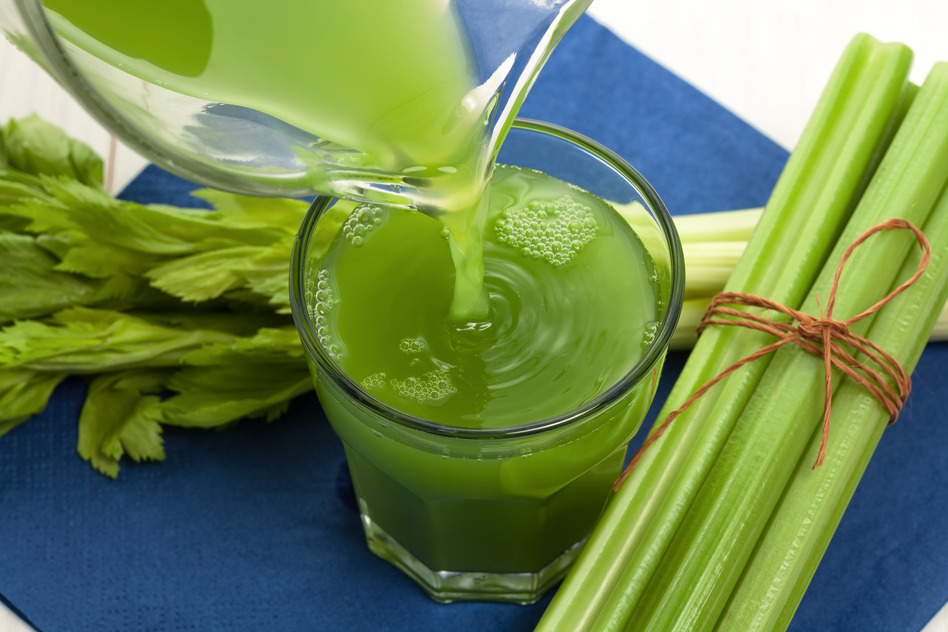
Celery juice

William is the originator of the celery juice diet, and journalistic research has led others to conclude that he is the primary source. William believes that "the science behind the healing powers of celery juice is just yet to be discovered." Currently, none of William's claims can be scientifically proven.

William claims that celery juice has medicinal uses. He suggests that it can "improve energy levels," reduce bloating, increase "clarity of mind," and even improve such conditions as headaches and anxiety. He claims that the juice is extra hydrating, "inflammation-reducing and microbiome-sustaining." He calls it "a miracle juice" and "one of the greatest healing tonics of all time." None of these claims are supported by scientific evidence, and no dietitians or other members of the medical community are supportive of these claims.

In an interview with UK's Evening Standard William describes how to make celery juice. He claims it has "healing powers" and explains that it is difficult to make.

You have to extract it like an herb. It's just like tea, you don't take the teabags and throw them in the Nutribullet – there is big confusion about this... This is an herbal extraction. When you juice the celery, you're creating a tonic, it's just like green tea.

According to William, the juice must be pure, so not even a squeeze of lemon juice or a mixture of other vegetables is permitted. Per William, the juice should be consumed on an empty stomach, first thing in the morning. He recommends using 4 - 16 ounces of juice to start, and working up to 32 ounces. He says that it should be ingested at least 15–20 minutes before consuming other food.

Amanda Mull, of The Atlantic, interviewed two registered dietitians on the benefits of celery juice. They agreed that celery is a healthy snack, and that there is some evidence that celery may have benefits for managing blood pressure, but these benefits were observed when patients ate full stalks. One dietitian remarked, "there is no one food that will cure your cancer, inflammatory disease, or other ailment, so don't believe the hype you see and hear on Instagram."

Dietitian and Nutritionist, Marika Day, says of William's celery juice claims:

There's no scientific or research-based evidence to support this. There's no scientific research behind [the movement], and no evidence to support that it does the things it claims to do. In my opinion, it's making people believe that they need to or should be doing something, that their diseases are their fault and if they don't do something about it (i.e., drink celery juice), then they're failing.

Nutritionist Rhiannon Lambert of Harley Street also weighed in to point out that fiber is an important part of diet, and this is lost in the juicing process. She states that there is no current evidence for these more "magical claims" of celery juice, only anecdotal evidence. Australian dietitian Stefanie Valakas, interviewed by a reporter with news.com.au, also states that there is no evidence for these health claims and that any fiber benefits of celery are lost in the juicing process. Both remark that one is likely to get the same nutritional benefit from drinking a glass of water and eating a balanced diet.

Although most medical professionals agree that the potential harm in adding celery juice to one's diet is likely minimal, there is the possibility of a negative reaction with certain medications. Celery contains Vitamin K, which can potentially affect medications, such as Warfarin, if intake suddenly increases. There is also a potential risk of bloating and diarrhea for those with IBS.

Ginger Hultin, a dietitian and spokesperson Academy of Nutrition and Dietetics, commenting on the celery juice phenomena, warns it is dangerous to suggest using celery juice in an attempt to fight diseases as William and other proponents of celery juice do.

Dietitian Carrie Dennett has commented that William has no medical training and that although research has confirmed anti-inflammatory benefits from isolated phytochemicals found in celery, no research supports William's popular claims about celery.

=== Other ===
William also claims, without evidence, that infertility is treatable with such practices as "creative visualizations, walking meditations, and breathing exercises," which will "draw white light into the reproductive organs."

== Controversy and criticism ==
=== Goop ===
In an investigative article in Inverse in January 2018, Gwyneth Paltrow's company Goop was criticized for posting articles by William and featuring him as their "trusted expert" despite his lack of medical credentials.

=== Soliciting Amazon reviews ===
Jonathan Jarry, of the McGill Office for Science and Society, argues that some of William's accolades are not naturally achieved. For example, he notes that William offered entry into a contest where participants could win autographed books, private consultations, and live show tickets in exchange for positive book reviews on Amazon.

Rae Paoletta, of Inverse, found that William's publisher, Hay House, ran a lottery to give prizes to whoever wrote the "most inspiring" Amazon review for his 2015 book titled "Medical Medium." According to Paoletta, "when Inverse asked Amazon about the accusations of positive book reviews for compensation, a spokesperson confirmed the e-commerce site would be investigating the claims."

=== Practicing medicine without a license ===
Jarry also argues that William is practicing medicine without a license. In William's operating state of Florida, the definition of practicing medicine is as follows:

'Practice of medicine' means the diagnosis, treatment, operation, or prescription for any human disease, pain, injury, deformity, or other physical or mental condition.

On William's radio shows he allows fans to call in and describe their symptoms. He performs "scans" with his angel guide, and then offers advice to the caller, suggesting things like eliminating certain food groups, taking vitamin B12, or doing a celery juice cleanse. Jarry argues that this constitutes "practicing medicine" based on the aforementioned definition.

Jarry also describes the case of a woman who, six months after being "scanned" by William on a TV program and found to be completely healthy by "Spirit," was diagnosed with a serious blood disease that William and Spirit were not able to detect.

=== Other ===
Jennifer Gunter, an OB/GYN from San Francisco who has criticized Goop in the past, made the following statement regarding William:

Promoting the Medical Medium is no different than promoting anti-vaccine views or cleanses or coffee enemas. The minimum is that people waste money, but there is great potential for harm with many of the therapies that are recommended and delays in diagnosis.

Harriet Hall argues that "William's belief system has no grounding in reality or science." She observes that there is no evidence to back up William's claimed divine guidance.

== Selected publications ==
- Medical Medium: Secrets Behind Chronic and Mystery Illness and How to Finally Heal (2015) ISBN 978-1-401948290
- Medical Medium Life-Changing Foods Save Yourself and the Ones You Love With The Hidden Healing Powers of Fruits & Vegetables (2016) ISBN 978-1401948320
- Medical Medium Thyroid Healing The Truth Behind Hashimoto's, Graves', Insomnia, Hypothyroidism, Thyroid Nodules & Epstein-Barr (2017) ISBN 978-1401948368
- Medical Medium Liver Rescue: Answers to Eczema, Psoriasis, Diabetes, Strep, Acne, Gout, Bloating, Gallstones, Adrenal Stress, Fatigue, Fatty Liver, Weight Issues, SIBO & Autoimmune Disease (2018) ISBN 978-1401954406
- Medical Medium Celery Juice: The Most Powerful Medicine of Our Time Healing Millions Worldwide (2019) ISBN 978-1401957650
- Medical Medium Cleanse To Heal: Healing Plans For Sufferers of Anxiety, Depression, Acne, Eczema, Lyme, Gut Problems, Brain Fog, Weight Issues, Migraines, Bloating, Vertigo, Psoriasis, Cysts, Fatigue, PCOS, Fibroids, UTI, Endometriosis & Autoimmune (2020) ISBN 978-1401958459
- Brain Saver: Answers to Brain Inflammation, Mental Health, Brain Fog, Neurological Symptoms, ADHD, Anxiety, OCD, Depression, Heavy Metals, Epstein-Barr, Seizures, Lyme Addiction, Alzheimer's, Autoimmune & Eating Disorders (2022) ISBN 978-1401954383
- Medical Medium Brain Saver Protocols, Cleanses & Recipes: For Neurological, Autoimmune & Mental Health (2022) ISBN 978-1401971335
