= Heeling =

Heeling may refer to:

- Heeling (sailing)
- A behavior in herding dogs
- A dog obedience training task
- A dog obedience trial exercise
- Part of a team roping rodeo event

== See also ==
- Heel (disambiguation)
- Healing
