= Francis Glanville =

British general

Major-General Francis Glanville
- Born: 19 March 1827; Lawhitton, Cornwall
- Died: 11 February 1910 (aged 82); Plymouth
- Military career
- Allegiance: United Kingdom
- Branch: British Army
- Service years: 1844–1877
- Rank: Major-General
- Unit: Royal Artillery

Major-General Francis Robert Glanville (1827–1910) was a senior British Army officer.

== Biography ==
A descendant of Sir John Glanville MP (1542–1600), and Sir John Glanville MP (1586–1661), the Speaker of the House of Commons, and the grandson of Rt. Hon. Reginald Pole-Carew MP (1753–1835), Francis Glanville was born at Hexworthy House in Lawhitton, Cornwall, on 19 March 1827. He was educated at Bedford School. He received his first commission in the Royal Artillery as a Second Lieutenant on 19 December 1844 and was promoted to lieutenant on 2 April 1846. He further advanced to colonel on 29 December 1872 and retired from the Royal Artillery as a major-general on 14 July 1877.

On Sept 3, 1860, while stationed in Gibraltar, Glanville married Dona Maria Concepcion Guadalupe, the daughter of Don Francis Carreras, with whom he had seven sons and five daughters. Major General Francis Glanville died in Plymouth on 11 February 1910, aged 82. His widow died on 12 February 1922 at Plymouth. They were both buried at St Germans, Cornwall, England, where a memorial honoring them can be found inside the church.
