= Sampson Hele =

English politician (c.1582–c.1655)

Member of Parliament for Tavistock
- In office 1624–1624 Serving with John Pym
- Preceded by: Sir Baptist Hicks; Sir Francis Glanville
- Succeeded by: John Pym; Sir Francis Glanville

Member of Parliament for Plympton Erle
- In office 1614–1614 Serving with Warwick Hele
- Preceded by: Warwick Hele; Sir William Strode
- Succeeded by: Warwick Hele; Sir William Strode

Personal details
- Born: c. 1582
- Died: c. 1655
- Spouse: Joan Glanville
- Relations: Juliana Osborne, Duchess of Leeds (granddaughter)
- Parent(s): Walter Hele; Elizabeth Strode
- Education: Broadgates Hall, Oxford

Sampson Hele (c. 1582 – c. 1655) of Gnaton and of Halwell, Devon, was an English politician who sat in the House of Commons in 1614 and 1624.

== Early life ==
Hele was born c. 1582 into the junior line of a minor gentry family which had settled in Devon since at least the twelfth century. He was the son of Walter Hele of Lewston, Devon and the former Elizabeth Strode, daughter of William Strode of Newnham, Devon. He matriculated at Broadgates Hall, Oxford on 6 May 1597, aged 15.

== Career ==
Upon his father's death in 1609, he inherited around 850 acres, including three manors, most of which was located in the south-west of the county, near Plymouth and Plympton. In 1614, he was elected Member of Parliament for Plympton Erle on the interest of his cousin Sir Warwick Hele. A Royalist during the Civil War, he was appointed Sheriff of Devon for 1621, and then elected MP for Tavistock in 1624 on the interest of his brother-in-law, Sir Francis Glanville.

== Personal life ==
Hele married Joan Glanville, eldest daughter of Sir John Glanville of Killworthy, Devon. Together, they were the parents of eight sons (two who died young) and five daughters, including:

- Roger Hele, who married Juliana Prestwood. After his death, she married Sir Thomas Putt, 2nd Baronet.

Hele died before 4 December 1655 when his will, made on 10 October 1653, was proved. In it, he bequeathed more than £6,000 to his wife and children, in addition to lands he had already bestowed on them.

=== Descendants ===
Through his son Roger, he was a grandfather of Juliana Osborne, Duchess of Leeds, the third wife of Peregrine Osborne, 3rd Duke of Leeds, and later the wife of Charles Colyear, 2nd Earl of Portmore.

Parliament of England
Preceded by Warwick Hele; Sir William Strode	Member of Parliament for Plympton Erle; 1614; With: Warwick Hele	Succeeded by Warwick Hele; Sir William Strode
Preceded by Sir Baptist Hicks; Sir Francis Glanville	Member of Parliament for Tavistock; 1624; With: John Pym	Succeeded by John Pym; Sir Francis Glanville
