= Dogs of Peace =

American Christian rock band

- Origin: Nashville, Tennessee
- Genres: Rock and roll; Alternative rock; Christian rock; Christian alternative rock
- Years active: 1995–present
- Labels: Sparrow; Suite 28
- Members: Gordon Kennedy; Jimmie Lee Sloas; Blair Masters; John Hammond; Jeff Balding
- Website: dogsofpeace.com

Dogs of Peace are an American Christian rock band from Nashville, Tennessee, and they started making music together in 1995. They have released two studio albums, Speak (1996) and Heel (2016).

== Background ==
The band are session musicians from Nashville, Tennessee, where they formed in 1995 with vocalist and guitarist, Gordon Kennedy of White Heart, vocalist and bassist, Jimmie Lee Sloas of The Imperials, background vocalist and keyboardist, Blair Masters, drummer and percussionist, John Hammond, and music engineer and music producer, Jeff Balding.

== Music history ==
Their first studio album, Speak, was released on February 22, 1996, by Sparrow Records. The second studio album, Heel, was released by Suite 28 Records, on April 22, 2016. Kennedy talked to New Release Today about the song "He's the Light of the World".

== Members ==
- Gordon Kennedy – vocals, guitar
- Jimmie Lee Sloas – vocals, bass
- Blair Masters – keys, background vocals
- John Hammond – drums, percussion
- Jeff Balding – engineer, producer

== Discography ==
Studio albums

- Speak (February 22, 1996, Sparrow)
- Heel (April 22, 2016, Suite 28)
