= Heals (band) =

- Origin: Bandung, Indonesia
- Genres: Shoegaze; Electronica
- Years active: 2013–present
- Labels: Ffwd Records
- Members: Alyuadi Febryansyah; Reza Arinal; Octavia Variana; Adi Reza
- Past members: Muhammad Ramdhan

Heals is a rock band from Bandung, Indonesia, formed in 2013. The band consists of Alyuadi Febryansyah, Reza Arinal, Muhammad Ramdhan, Octavia Variana, and Adi Reza.

== History ==
=== Music career ===
Heals started their career by releasing their debut single, Myselves, in 2016. Heals released their first album, Spectrum, on April 9, 2017.

== Members ==
=== Current members ===
- Alyuadi Febryansyah – lead vocals, rhythm guitar (2013–present)
- Reza Arinal – backing vocals, lead guitar (2013–present)
- Octavia Variana – backing vocals, bass (2013–present)
- Adi Reza – drums (2013–present)

=== Former members ===
- Muhammad Ramdhan – lead guitar (2013–2020)

== Discography ==
=== Studio albums ===
- Spectrum (2017)
- Emerald (2023)

=== Singles ===
- "Void" (2014)
- "Wave" (2015)
- "Myselves" (2015)
- "False Alarm" (2016)
- "Weathre" (2023)
- "Air Emas" (2023)
- "Are You Ready" (2023)
