= A.G. Healing =

Defunct Australian electronics company

A.G. Healing was an Australian manufacturing firm founded in 1896 by Alfred George Healing. Initially producing bicycles, in 1912 it became a proprietary company, with 50 employees and 25,000 bicycles produced at the peak of production. The company diversified into the importation of radio receivers in 1933, but with the introduction of tariffs to imported goods, it moved to the production of their own radios. In 1956 the company commenced manufacturing television sets, refrigerators and washing machines. It also distributed automotive parts.

In 1959 the company sold the bicycle division to focus on domestic appliances, and took over heavy engineering firm AE Goodwin in 1961. In 1969 the company posted a loss of almost $24 million and went into receivership, recovering to some degree until failing in 1975, as Australia moved away from economic protectionism.
