= HEAL =

HEAL may refer to:

- El Alamein International Airport
- Health and Environment Alliance, European non-profit
