= Warwick Hele =

English landowner and politician

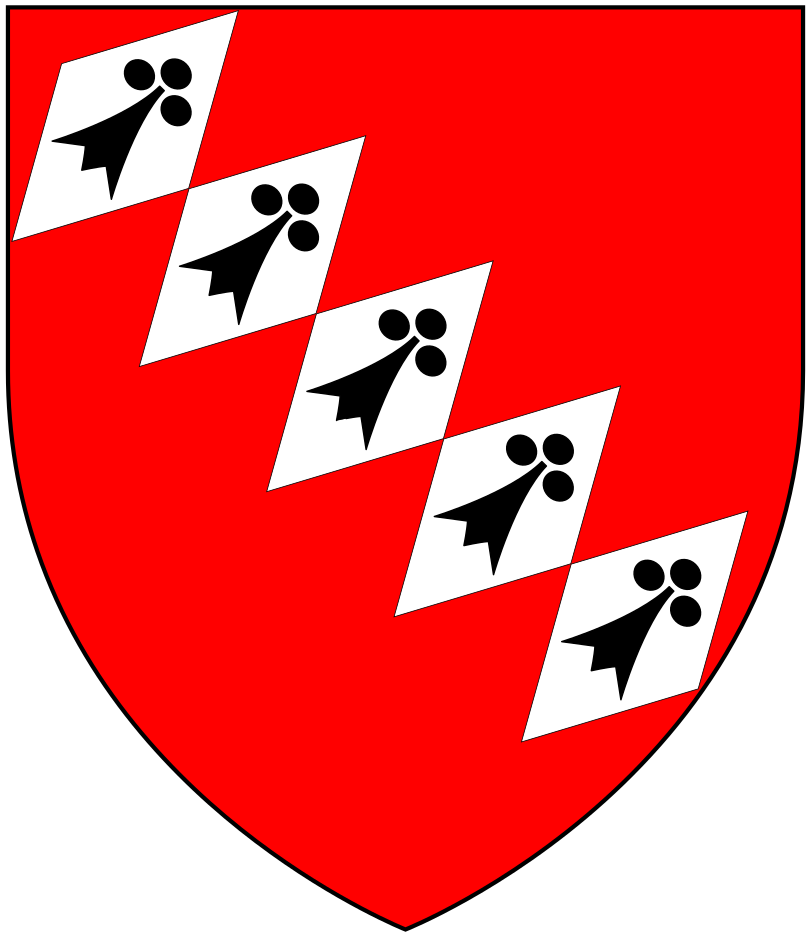
Arms of Hele: Gules, five fusils in bend argent on each an ermine spot

Sir Warwick Hele (1568 – 15 January 1626) was an English landowner and politician who sat in the House of Commons at various times between 1597 and 1625.

== Origins ==
Hele was the eldest son of John Hele (died 1608), a money-lender and MP and was a brother of John Hele (died 1605), also MP for Plympton Erle.

== Career ==
He was a student of Inner Temple in 1581. In 1597 he was elected a Member of Parliament for Plymouth. He was treasurer with Gregory Sprint for maimed soldiers for Devon by 1600 and was a J.P. for Devon from about 1601. He was knighted in 1603.

In 1605, he was elected an MP for Plympton Erle. He succeeded to the large local estates of his father in 1608. In 1614, he was elected MP for Plympton Erle again. He was Sheriff of Devon from 1618 to 1619. In 1621, he was re-elected MP for Plympton Erle and was again elected MP for Plympton Erle in 1625.

== Marriage ==
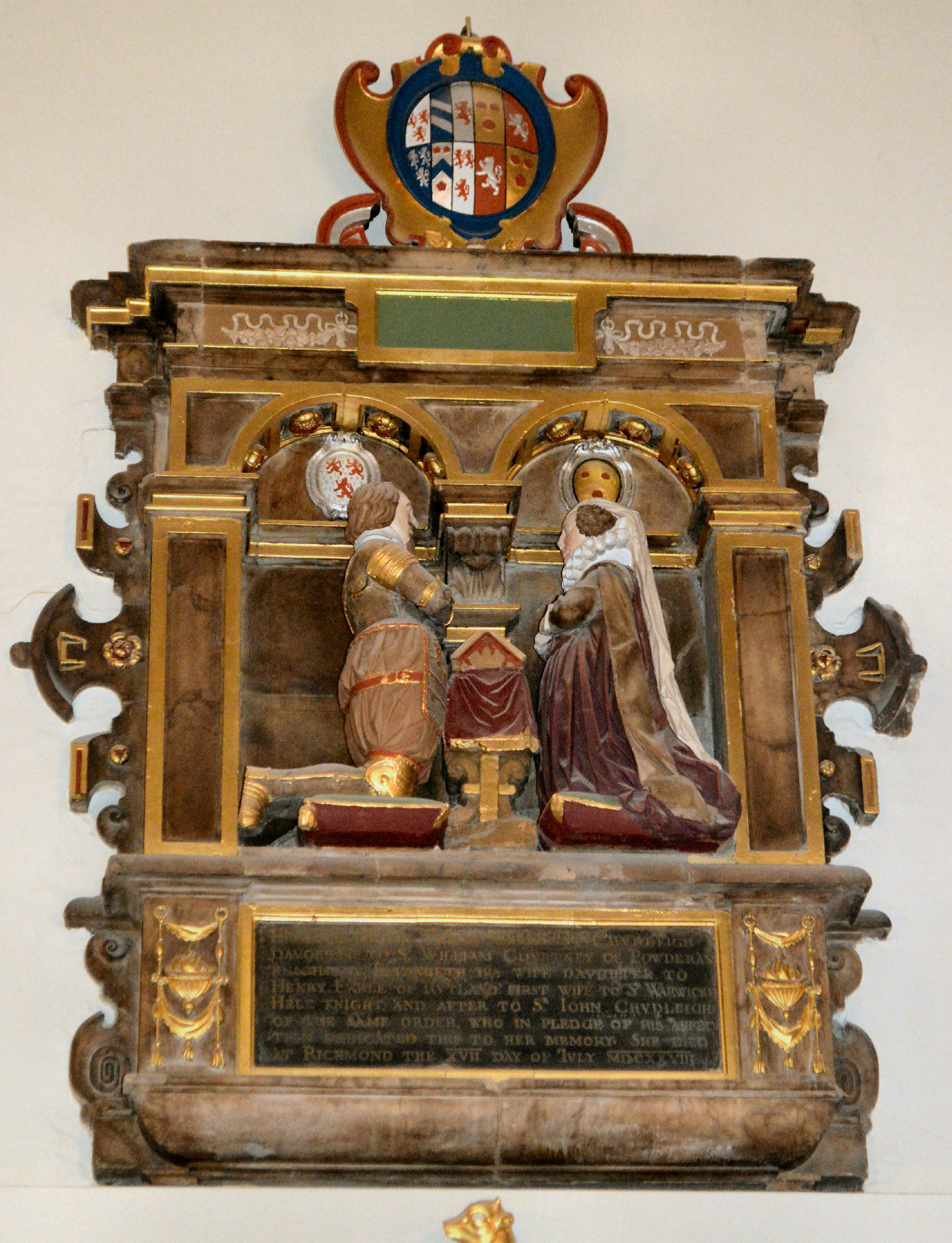
mural monument to Margaret Courtenay, second wife of Warwick Hele, with her second husband Sir John Chudleigh, St Mary Magdalene's Church, Richmond, Surrey

Hele married firstly Mary Halse, daughter of John Halse of Kenedon and secondly, as her first husband, Margaret Courtenay (d.1628), eldest daughter of Sir William Courtenay (1553–1630), of Powderham in Devon, de jure 3rd Earl of Devon, by his first wife Elizabeth Manners, a daughter of Henry Manners, 2nd Earl of Rutland. Margaret survived him and remarried to Sir John Chudleigh. Her mural monument survives in St Mary Magdalene's Church, Richmond, Surrey, showing kneeling effigies of herself and her second husband Sir John Chudleigh.

== Death ==
Hele died on 15 January 1626, around the age of 58.

Parliament of England
Preceded by Sir Francis Drake; Robert Bassett	Member of Parliament for Plymouth; 1597; With: William Stallenge	Succeeded by William Stallenge; James Bagg
Preceded by Sir William Strode; John Hele	Member of Parliament for Plympton Erle; 1605–1621; With: Sir William Strode 1605–1611; Sampson Hele 1614; Sir William Strode	Succeeded by Sir Francis Drake; John Garret
Preceded by Sir Francis Drake; John Garret	Member of Parliament for Plympton Erle; 1625; With: Sir William Strode	Succeeded by Sir William Strode; Sir Thomas Hele
