= Healer =

Healer may refer to:

== Conventional medicine ==
- Doctor of Medicine
- Health professional

== Alternative medicine ==
- Faith healer
- Folk healer
- Healer (alternative medicine), someone who purports to aid recovery from ill health
- Spiritual healer

== Film ==
- The Healer (1935 film), an American film by Reginald Barker
- The Healers (film), a 1974 American TV film featuring Lance Kerwin
- Healer (film), a 1994 American film starring Tyrone Power, Jr
- The Healer, a 1994 British television film starring Paul Rhys
- The Healer (2016 film), a comedy-drama film starring Oliver Jackson-Cohen, Jonathan Pryce, Camilla Luddington

== Television ==
=== Episodes ===
- "Healer", Sonic Underground episode 33 (1999)
- "Healer", The Twilight Zone (1985) season 1, episode 3a (1985)
- "The Healer", Dead Man's Gun season 1, episode 9 (1997)
- "The Healer", Dr. Simon Locke episode 14 (1971)
- "The Healer", Death in Paradise series 7, episode 4 (2018)
- "The Healer", Ideal series 5, episode 1 (2009)
- "The Healer", Law & Order: Criminal Intent season 5, episode 18 (2006)
- "The Healer", M Squad season 1, episode 32 (1958)
- "The Healer", Niña Niño episode 18 (2021)
- "The Healer", Painkiller Jane episode 15 (2007)
- "The Healer", Psi Factor: Chronicles of the Paranormal season 1, episode 10b (1996)
- "The Healer", The Mod Squad season 2, episode 11 (1969)

=== Shows ===
- Healer (TV series), a 2014 South Korean television series
- The Healers (audio drama), an audio drama based on Doctor Who

== Music ==
- The Healers (album), a 1987 album by David Murray
- The Healer (John Lee Hooker album), a 1989 album by John Lee Hooker
- The Healer (Sumac album), a 2024 album by the American/Canadian metal band Sumac
- Johnny Marr and the Healers, who released an album in 2003
- The Healer, a 2008 song from the album New Amerykah Part One (4th World War) by Erykah Badu
- Healer / Across the Shields, a 2009 EP by Torche
- The Healer (Jenkins), a 2014 cantata by Karl Jenkins
- Healer (Alex Cuba album), a 2015 album by Alex Cuba
- Healer, a 2022 album by Casting Crowns
- "Healer", a 2021 song by Day6 from The Book of Us: Negentropy – Chaos Swallowed Up in Love

== Literature ==
- Healer, a 1976 science fiction novel by F. Paul Wilson
- Healer, a 1983 novel by Peter Dickinson
- Healer, a 2007 novel by Joyce Carol Thomas
- Healer, a 2010 novel by Carol Cassella
- The Healer, a 1911 novel by Robert Herrick
- The Healer, a 1955 novel by Frank G. Slaughter
- The Healer, a 1971 novel by Daniel P. Mannix
- The Healer, a 1990 novel by Aharon Appelfeld
- The Healer, a 2002 novel by Dee Henderson, the sixth installment in the O’Malley Series
- The Healer, a 2005 novel by Michael Blumlein
- The Healer, a 2018 novel by Donna Freitas
- The Healers, a 1978 novel by Ayi Kwei Armah
- The Healers, a 1979 novel by Gerald Green
- The Healers, a 1983 novel by Henry Denker
- The Healers, a 1995 novel by Ann Cleeves

== Other uses ==
- Healer (comics), a mutant in the Marvel Comics Universe
- Healer (Dungeons & Dragons), a character class in Dungeons & Dragons
- Healer (gaming), a character type in video games
- Healer (role variant), a role variant of the Keirsey Temperament Sorter
- Jason (given name), Greek derived name, literally meaning "healer".

== See also ==
- Heal (disambiguation)
- Healing (disambiguation)
- List of esoteric healing articles
