= Heel (album) =

Studio album by Dogs of Peace
- Released: April 22, 2016
- Genres: Rock and roll; Alternative rock; Christian rock; Christian alternative rock
- Length: 45:26
- Label: Suite 28 C

Dogs of Peace chronology
Speak (1996)	Heel (2016)

Heel is the second studio album from Dogs of Peace. Suite 28 C Records released the album on April 22, 2016.

== Background ==
This is the band's second album, coming out twenty years after their debut Speak.

== Music, lyrics and artwork ==
From Jesus Freak Hideout, they believe the release contains "Strong acoustic and electric guitar hooks are accompanied by layers of beautifully woven instrumentation to create impressive dynamic musical backdrops. The skilled musicianship is matched with Christ-centered lyrics that speak boldly about Jesus' sacrifice on the cross and our hopelessness without Him." For The Phantom Tollbooth, they boast "don’t forget to really – I mean really – check out the album artwork. Brilliant."

== Critical reception ==
Professional ratings
Review scores
Source	Rating
CCM Magazine	5/5 stars
Jesus Freak Hideout	4/5 stars 4.5/5 stars
The Phantom Tollbooth	4.5/5 stars

Awarding the album five stars from CCM Magazine, Kevin Sparkman writes, "No new tricks needed, Kennedy’s timeless vocals along with stellar musicianship and matchless production keep the dog-and-pony-show at bay, proving their signature brand of rock ‘n roll sits, and stays." Bert Saraco, indicating in a four and a half out of five review by The Phantom Tollbooth, says, "Dogs of Peace have produced an album of songs so well-crafted, so powerfully performed and produced, with such clever and insightful lyrics that most everything placed alongside sounds either lazy (come on – write songs, folks!), pretentious, too corporate, or self-indulgent. Am I being too extreme here? Probably – because I'm listening to this fine album once again as I write this. Still, the fact remains – Heel has avoided all of the pitfalls that plague even the best efforts of the current music scene. Every song sounds fresh. All of the arrangements are well thought-out. There are hooks and memorable melodies – and the playing is great!"

Michael Weaver, giving the album four stars at Jesus Freak Hideout, states, "These are 'old dogs' and they aren't going to give that modern rock fix you're hoping for. Fans of Speak, classic rock, or those currently enjoying Steve Taylor's revival, however, are all prime targets. Great musicians typically make great music and Dogs of Peace are no exception. Hopefully the guys decide to stick around for more than one album this time around." Rating the album four and a half stars for Jesus Freak Hideout, Christopher Smith describes, "With Heel, Dogs of Peace have blended 90's alternative rock with elements of classic rock, making a coherent and refreshingly timely album."

== Track listing ==
No.	Title	Length
1.	"One Flight Away"	3:04
2.	"Sacrifice"	4:33
3.	"Dark Without"	2:59
4.	"If It Weren't for You"	2:28
5.	"All This for a Piece of Fruit"	3:55
6.	"Only the Gold"	3:15
7.	"Friend of the Groom"	3:52
8.	"Healed"	4:48
9.	"He's the Light of the World"	5:03
10.	"Light into the Darkness / Shine Dog / 3:16"	9:35
11.	"Amazing Grace"	1:52
12.	"Crush" (iTunes Bonus Track)	3:30
Total length:		45:26
