= Alf Healing =

Australian rules footballer

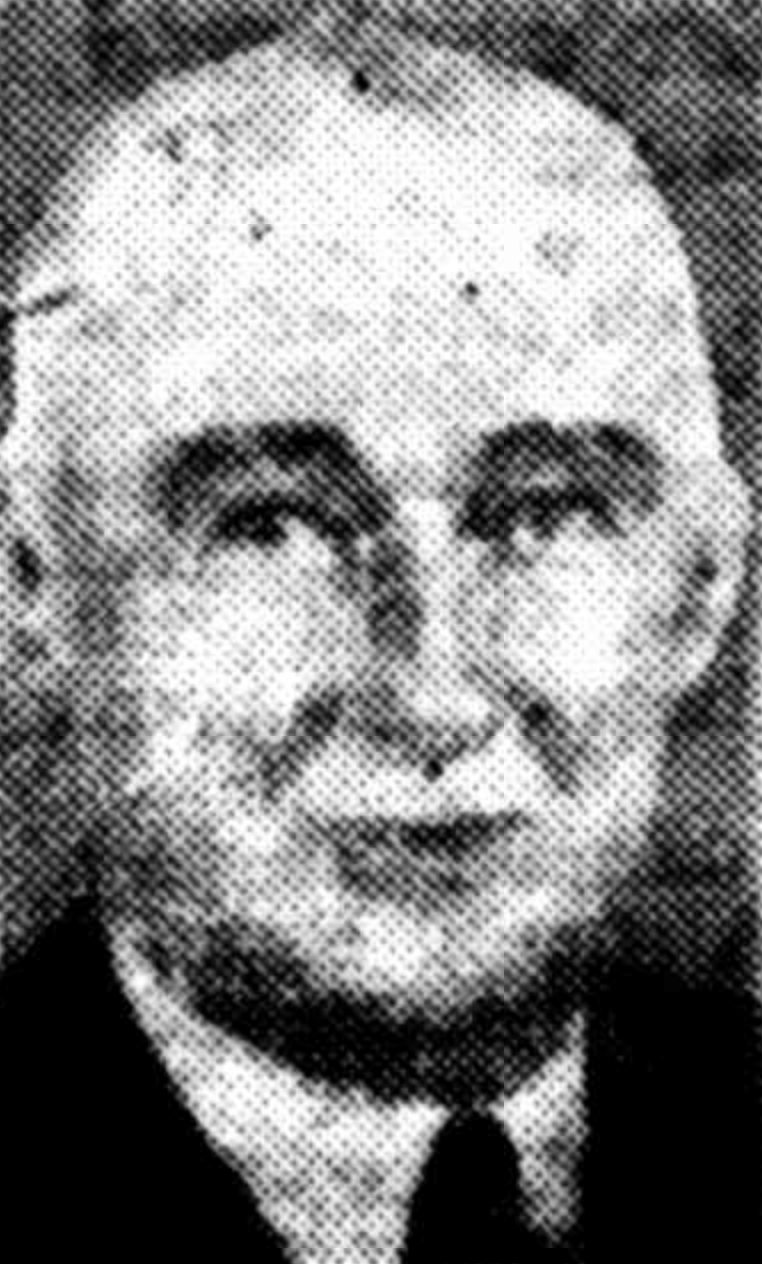
- Healing c. 1945

Personal information
- Full name: Alfred George Healing
- Born: 23 August 1868; Richmond, Victoria
- Died: 18 February 1945 (aged 76); Kew, Victoria
- Position: Centre half-back

Playing career^{1}
Years	Club	Games (Goals)
1897	Melbourne	10 (0)
- ^{1} Playing statistics correct to the end of 1897.

Alfred George Healing (23 August 1868 – 18 February 1945) was an Australian rules footballer who played for the Melbourne Football Club in the Victorian Football League (VFL) and Victorian Football Association (VFA). Healing was the founder of A. G. Healing Ltd., one of the largest manufacturing companies in Australia at the time of his death in 1945.
