= John Hele (died 1605) =

English politician

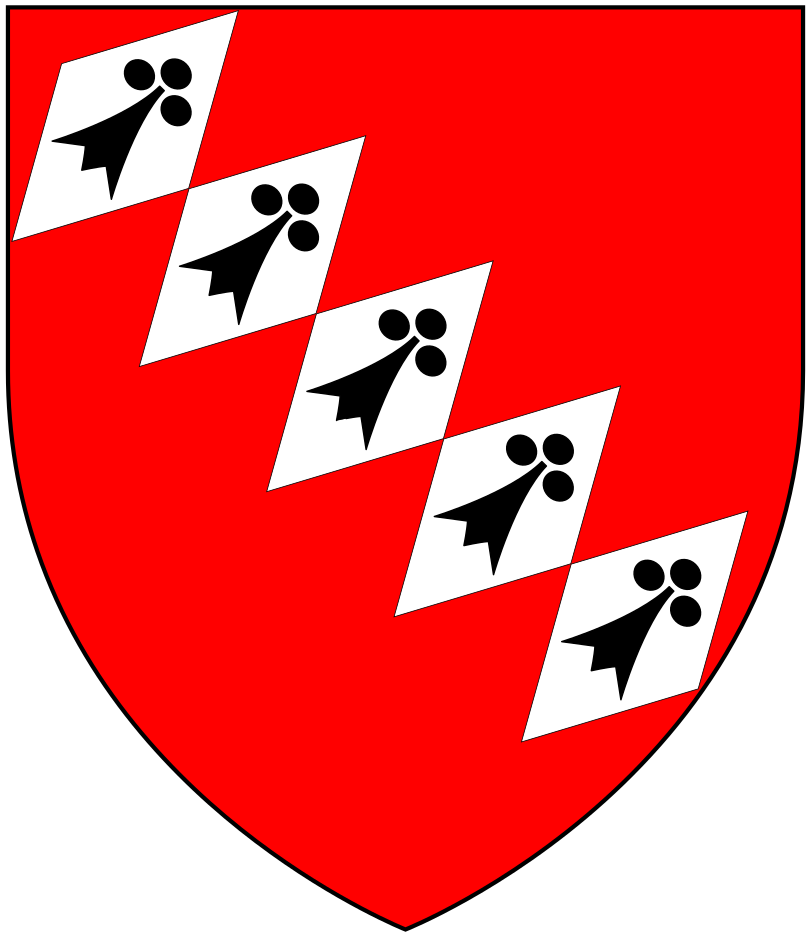
Arms of Hele: Gules, five fusils in bend argent on each an ermine spot

John Hele (1571–1605) was an English politician who sat in the House of Commons between 1601 and 1605.

Hele was the second son of John Hele who was a money-lender and MP. He was a student of Exeter College, Oxford in 1588 and of Inner Temple in 1590. He was a J.P for Devon from 1592. In 1601, he was elected Member of Parliament for Plympton Erle. He was elected MP for Plympton Erle again in 1604 to replace Sir Henry Beaumont and sat until his death the following year.

Hele died at the age of about 34. He was the brother of Warwick Hele.

Parliament of England
| Preceded by George Southcote; Edward Hancock | Member of Parliament for Plympton Erle; 1601; With: Sir William Strode | Succeeded by Sir William Strode; Sir Henry Beaumont |
| Preceded by Sir William Strode; Sir Henry Beaumont | Member of Parliament for Plympton Erle; 1604–1605; With: Sir William Strode | Succeeded by Sir William Strode; Warwick Hele |
