= Heale =

Heale is a surname. Notable people with the surname include:

- Gary Heale (born 1958), English footballer
- Jimmy Heale (1914–1997), English footballer
- Theophilus Heale (1816–1885), New Zealand politician
- William Heale (1859–1907), English cricketer

== See also ==
- Heale Peak, mountain of Antarctica
- Heal (disambiguation)
