= Rhiannon Lambert =

English registered nutritionist and author

- Born: Rhiannon Emily Lambert; 1989 (age 35–36); Ealing
- Occupation: Registered nutritionist

Rhiannon Lambert (born 1989) is an English registered nutritionist, author and advocate of plant-rich dietary patterns. She specialises in eating disorders and weight management.

== Career ==
Lambert was born in 1989. She obtained a BSc in Nutrition and Health in 2014 and an MSc in Obesity, Risks and Prevention in 2016 from University of Roehampton. She is a master practitioner in eating disorders approved by the British Psychological Society and a Level 3 personal trainer. Lambert is the founder of Rhitrition, a private nutrition clinic on Harley Street. She is the host of the Food for Thought podcast which has over 7 million listens.

Lambert is an advocate of plant-based nutrition and has noted that a common misconception is that plant-based diets and veganism are the same. According to Lambert, "plant-based simply means eating more plants and finding ways to incorporate more plants into your diet, not excluding all animal products". In 2024, she authored The Science of Plant-Based Nutrition. Lambert has recommended broccoli, carrots, kale, red cabbage and sweet potatoes as some of the most nutritious vegetables. She has argued that eating steak once a week is "absolutely fine" if the rest of the diet is predominantly plant-based. She has recommended the consumption of eggs, stating "they’re a naturally nutritious food that’s accessible to everyone, protein-rich and vitamin-filled. They are a healthy food that’s great value for money and they’re wonderfully versatile – a staple for a balanced, healthy diet".

Lambert has criticised fad diets such as clean eating and the carnivore diet for making claims unsupported by scientific evidence. She has written for The Telegraph and Women's Health.

== Selected publications ==
- Re-Nourish. Yellow Kite. 2017. ISBN 978-1473661769.
- The Science of Nutrition. DK. 2021. ISBN 978-0241506462.
- Deliciously Healthy Pregnancy. DK. 2022. ISBN 978-0241530566.
- The Science of Plant-Based Nutrition. DK. 2024. ISBN 978-0241668764.
