= William Heale =

English cricketer (1859–1907)

Personal information
- Full name: William Henry Heale
- Born: 27 April 1859; Hemel Hempstead, Hertfordshire, England
- Died: 24 April 1907 (aged 47); Lambeth, Surrey, England
- Batting: Right-handed
- Bowling: Right-arm medium

Domestic team information
- Years: Team
- 1881: Oxford University
- 1895: Hertfordshire

Career statistics
Competition	First-class
Matches	1
Runs scored	10
Batting average	5.00
100s/50s	–/–
Top score	9
Catches/stumpings	–/–
- Source: Cricinfo, 2 July 2019

William Henry Heale (24 April 1859 – 24 April 1907) was an English first-class cricketer.

Heale was born at Hemel Hempstead in April 1859. He was educated at Harrow School, before going up to Balliol College, Oxford. While studying at Oxford, he made a single appearance in first-class cricket for Oxford University against Middlesex at Lord's in 1881. Batting twice in the match, he was dismissed for a single run by George Burton in Oxford's first innings, while in their second innings he was dismissed for nine runs by Clement Cottrell. After graduating in 1883, he was ordained in the Church of England. He was the curate of Gamlingay from 1884–87 and the curate of a church at Walsall from 1887–92. His first role as a vicar was at the Holy Trinity Church in North Kensington from 1892–95. Heale played minor counties cricket for Hertfordshire in 1895, making three appearances in the Minor Counties Championship. He returned to being a curate at Hartshill, Staffordshire from 1891–1900, before serving as the vicar of Wolstanton from 1900–06 and Penn from 1906 until his death at Lambeth in April 1907.
