= John Hele (died 1608) =

English politician and lawyer

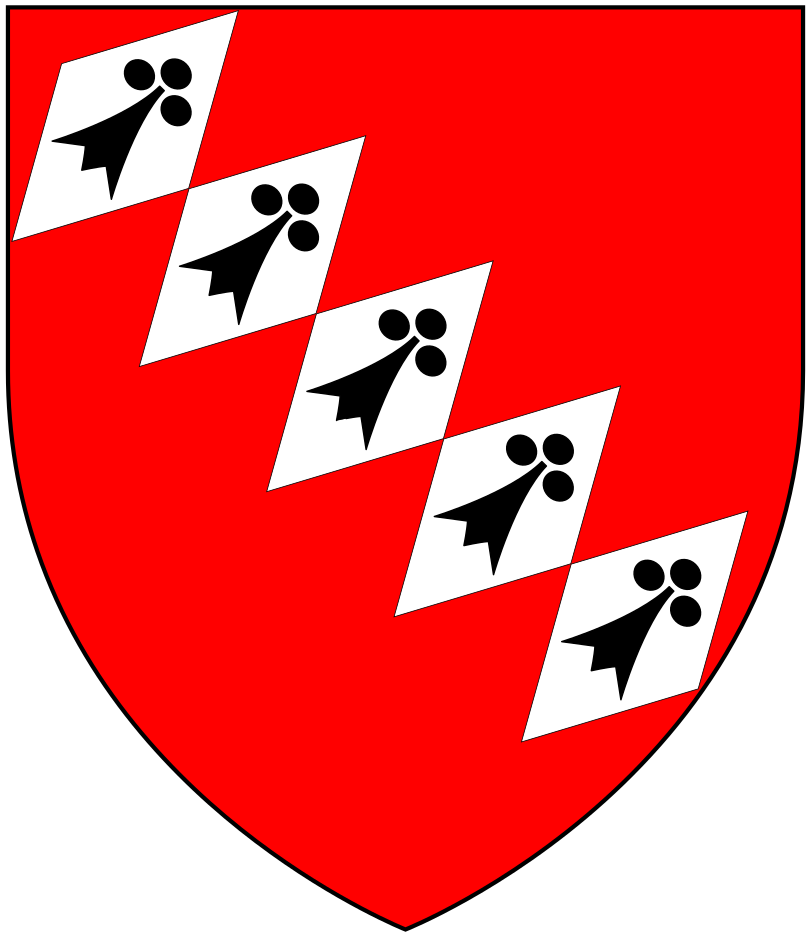
Arms of Hele: Gules, five fusils in bend argent on each an ermine spot

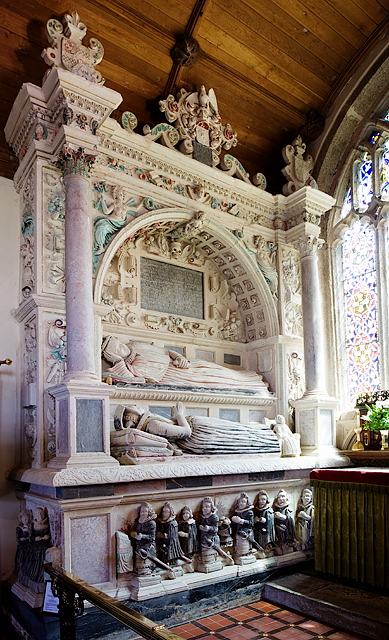
Monument in St Werburgh's Church, Wembury, to Sir John Hele (c. 1541–1608)

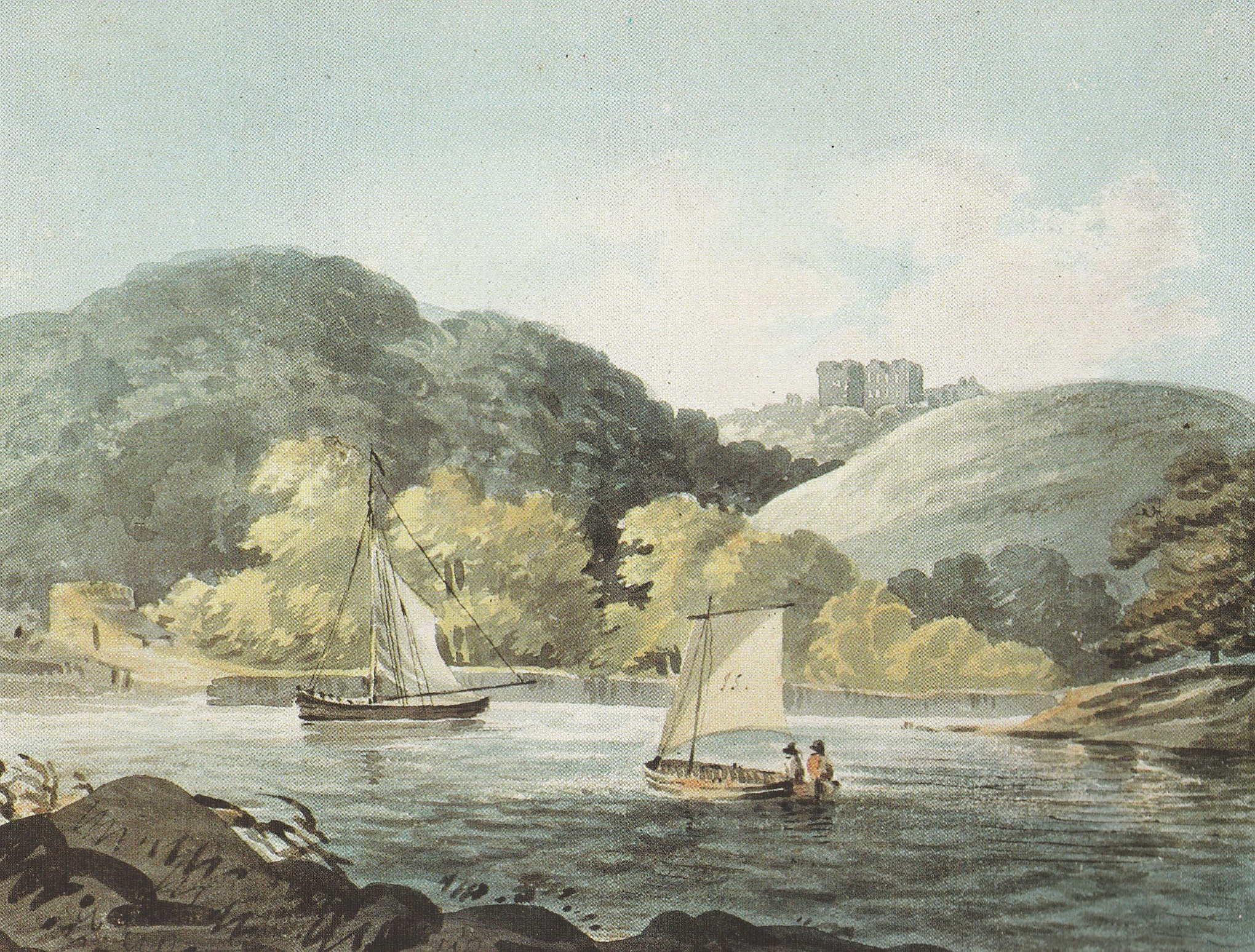
1797 watercolour by Rev. John Swete (d. 1821) of the ruins of Wembury House, built by Sir John Hele

Sir John Hele (c. 1541–1608) of Wembury in Devon, serjeant-at-law, was a Member of Parliament for Exeter and was Recorder of Exeter (1592–1605). He was one of Prince's Worthies of Devon (1701). He built at Wembury one of the grandest manor houses ever seen in Devon, called by his near contemporary Risdon (died 1640): "A magnificent house, equalling, if not exceeding, all other in these western parts, for uniform building; a sightly seat for shew; for receipt spacious; for cost sumptuous; for sight salubrious". It was already a ruin by about 1700, and was finally demolished in 1803. He founded a boys' hospital in Plymouth. His monument and effigy survives in Wembury Church.

== Origins ==
He was born in about 1543, the 6th son of Nicholas Hele of South Hele in Devon, by his second wife Margery Dune, daughter of Richard Dune (alias Down) of Holsworthy, Devon. His mother Margery Dune married secondly to Ellis (alias Elizeus) Warwick of Holbeton and of Batsborow, in the parish of St Budeaux, both in Devon, whose daughter and co-heiress from his earlier marriage, Mary Warwick, would become Sir John Hele's wife. One of his elder brothers was Thomas I Hele (died 1613) of Exeter and of Flete, Holbeton, Sheriff of Devon in 1600–01. The Hele family had originated at the estate of Hele in the parish of Cornwood in Devon.

== Career ==
He entered the Inner Temple as a law student and eventually became Lent Reader of the Inner Temple. He served as Member of Parliament for Exeter from 1592 to 1601, and was Recorder of Exeter from 14 July 1592 to the beginning of 1606. In November 1594 Hele became a serjeant-at-law and on 16 May 1602 was appointed Queen's Serjeant to Queen Elizabeth I (1558–1603). At the beginning of the reign of her successor King James I (1603–1625) his patent was renewed, and he was knighted. In November 1603 Hele was employed as King's Serjeant at the trial of Sir Walter Raleigh. On 8 February 1608 Hele obtained a dispensation, on grounds of age, from attendance as serjeant.

== Marriage and children ==
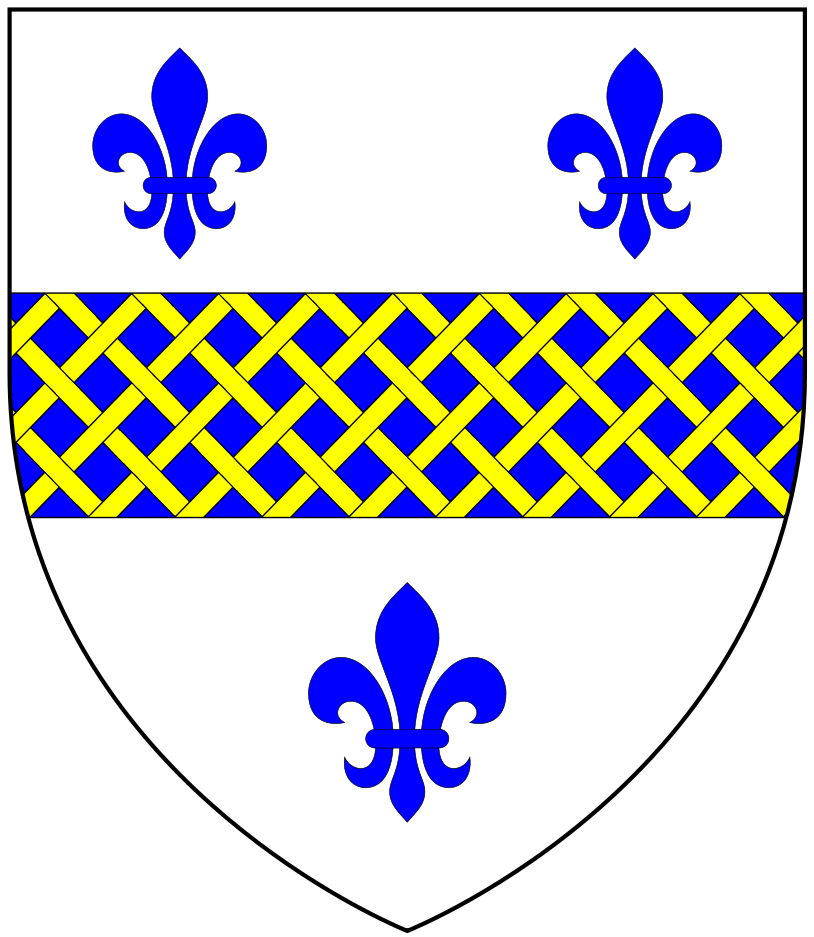
Arms of Warwick of St Budeaux: Argent, a fess azure fretty or between three fleurs-de-lys of the second, as visible quartered by Hele on the monument in Wembury Church to Sir John Hele

Hele married his step-sister Mary (or Margaret) Warwick (died 1571), a daughter and co-heiress of Ellis (alias Elizeus) Warwick of Holbeton and of Batsborow, in the parish of St Budeaux, both in Devon. The arms of Warwick, quartered by Hele (being the arms of his son Sir Warwick Hele), are visible on the monument to Sir John Hele in Wembury Church: Argent, a fess azure fretty or between three fleurs-de-lys of the second. By his wife he had eight sons and two daughters (whose kneeling effigies appear on the base of their father's monument in Wembury Church), including:

- Sir Warwick Hele (1568–1626), of Wembury, MP and Sheriff of Devon, eldest son and heir.
- John Hele (died 1605), 2nd son, Member of Parliament for Plympton Erle.
- Sir Francis Hele (died 1623), 4th son, knighted in 1608, who married Jane Rogers, a daughter of Edward Rogers of Kennington in Somerset. he had a son Sir John Hele (1610–1648), who was the heir of his uncle Sir Warwick Hele (1568–1626) of Wembury, and who left a sole daughter and heiress Jane Hele, who thus "brought a vast fortune" to her husband the profligate Sir Edward Hungerford (died 1711), MP. It is generally said of Hungerford that his own extravagance was his downfall, but it was claimed by others that his huge debts were inherited from his own father Anthony Hungerford and from his father-in-law Sir John Hele of Wembury, who had incurred them during the Civil War supporting the Royalist cause. Indeed an Act of Parliament mentioning these reasons was obtained by Hungerford in 1675–76 specifically allowing him to sell the manors inherited from Hele. In 1686 Hungerford sold the Wembury estate to John Pollexfen (1636–1715), merchant, a brother of Sir Henry Pollexfen, Lord Chief Justice of the Common Pleas.
- Philippa Hele, who married Sir Reginald Mohun, 1st Baronet as his second wife.

== Moneylending and reputation ==
Until about 1600 Hele had a high reputation, but then personal attacks on him started. Through his making of loans, and actions in recovering them, he exposed himself to attacks from the circle of Sir Thomas Egerton, one of his debtors, whose clients ran a successful personal vendetta against him. Hele had hoped to succeed Egerton as Master of the Rolls, but the outcome of his intrigues was quite different.

Hele lost a large sum in 1601 through the attainder of Robert Devereux, 2nd Earl of Essex, a key ally of his at court and was also owed a large sum by Henry Brooke, 11th Baron Cobham. In 1602 he went on circuit with Judge Francis Gawdy, making himself "odious and ridiculous", according to the gossip circulated by the letter-writer John Chamberlain. Cobham was then caught up in the Main Plot of 1603, and Hele was thought to have taken advantage of his legal position to exact repayment from him.

A petition was presented to the Privy Council by Sir William Dethick, Garter King-at-Arms, accusing Hele of violent conduct towards him in public, and Hele hardly denied it. The Council investigated Hele in 1604, and the matter was referred to the Star Chamber, which found against Hele on the ground that he had gone outside due process in dealing with Cobham. The result was that he was suspended from office, fined, and imprisoned for six weeks.

== Landholdings ==
Having amassed a fortune, he bought an estate at Wembury, near Plymouth, in Devon, where he built a grand mansion-house. He also had a house at Kew, and owned the manor of Shirford, Knighton hundred, Warwickshire. He purchased the manor of Yealmpton in Devon and from Sir Robert Prideaux (1550-post 1603) the estate of Orcheton, Modbury.

== Death and burial ==
Hele died on 4 June 1608 and was buried in Wembury Church, where his monument survives, showing effigies of himself and his children, inscribed in Latin as follows:

Hic jacet Johannes Hele, Miles, Serviens ad Legem Sereniss(imae) Dominae Reginae Elizab(ethae) & Jacobo Regi Magnae Britanniae, qui obiit quarto die Junii Anno Domini MDCVIII, (Anno) aetatis suae LXVI ("Here lies John Hele, Knight, Serjeant-at-Law to the most Serene Lady Queen Elizabeth and to James King of Great Britain, who departed on the fourth day of June in the year of Our Lord 1608, in the year of his age 66")

His will was proved in the Prerogative Court of Canterbury on 1 October 1608.

== Notes ==
Attribution

This article incorporates text from a publication now in the public domain: Stephen, Leslie; Lee, Sidney, eds. (1891). "Hele, John". Dictionary of National Biography. Vol. 25. London: Smith, Elder & Co.
