= Thomas Hele =

Thomas Hele may refer to:

- Sir Thomas Hele, 1st Baronet (1595–1670), English MP
- Thomas Hele (died 1665) (1630–1665), MP for Plympton Erle in 1661
- Thomas Hele (biochemist) (1881–1953), academic
