= Heel (disambiguation) =

The heel is the prominence at the posterior end of the foot.

Heel also may refer to:

- Heel (album), a 2016 album by Dogs of Peace
- Heel (corporation), a homeopathy company
- Heel (professional wrestling)
  - Heels (TV series), a 2021 TV series named after such wrestlers
- Heel (shoe), the part of the shoe supporting the heel
  - High-heeled shoes, also referred to as "heels"
- Heel (sock), the part of a sock covering the heel
- Heel, Netherlands, a village
- Heel of the hand, at the bottom of the palm
- The neck joint of a guitar
- The end of a loaf of bread
- "Heel", a dog obedience training command
- North Carolina Tar Heels, often known as the "Heels"
- Heeling (sailing), tilting sideways
- Heel (LNG carrier), a quantity of gas employed in the cargo cycle of liquid natural gas carriers
- Good Boy (2025 Komasa film) (also known as Heel), a 2025 black comedy thriller film

== See also ==
- Heeling (disambiguation)
