= John Glanville (judge) =

Member of the Parliament of England

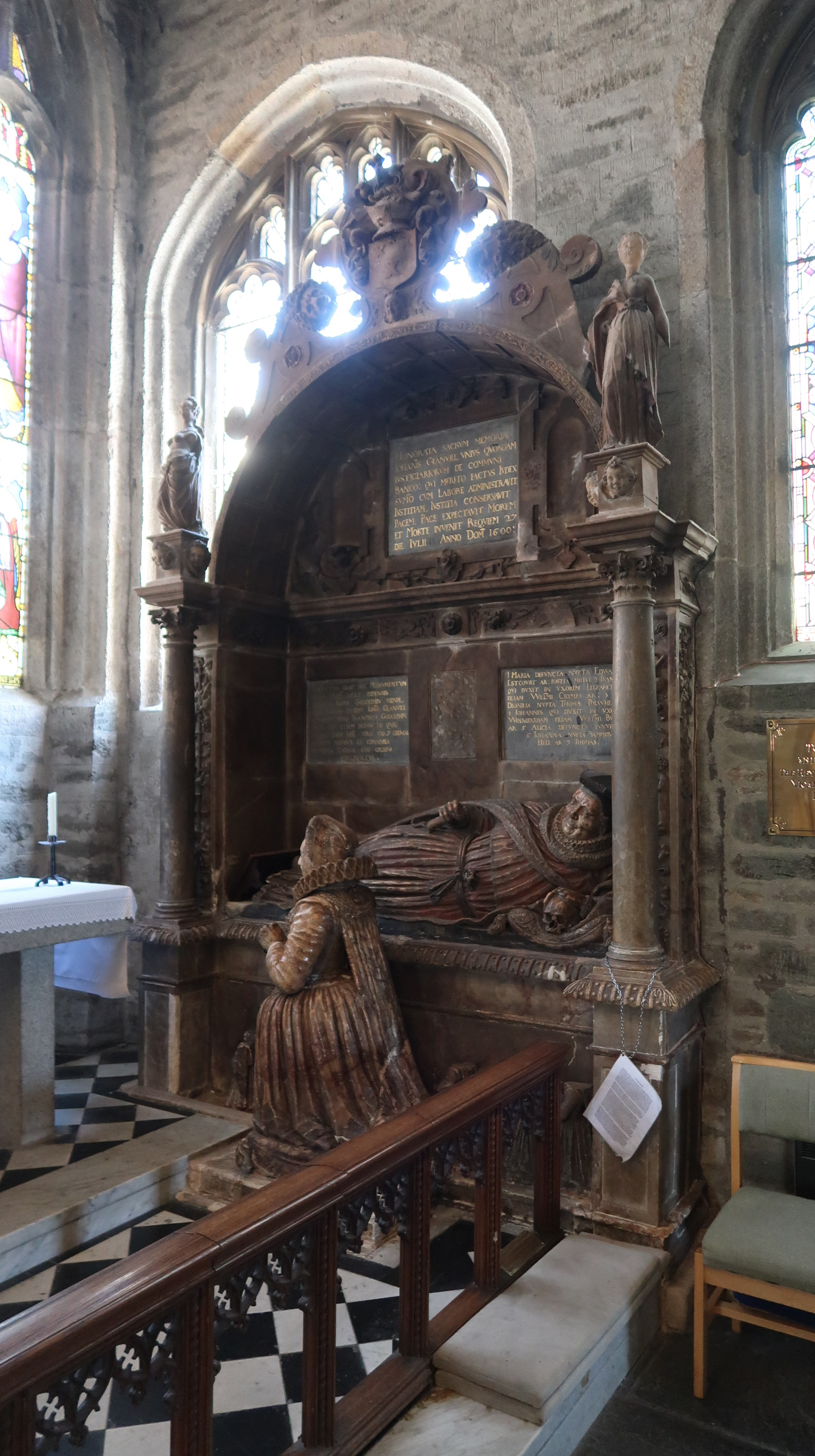
The Glanvill memorial in the Parish Church of St Eustachius, Tavistock (July 2022)

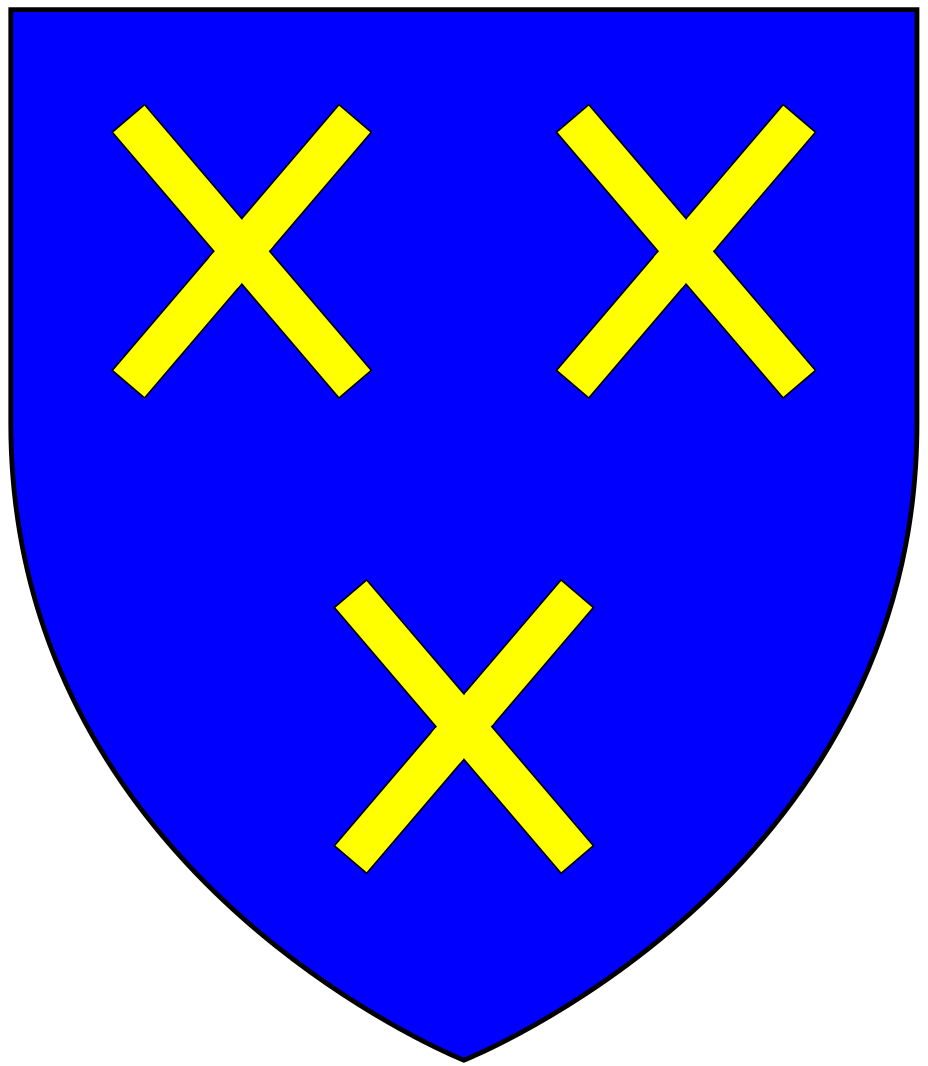
Arms of Glanville: Azure, three saltires or

Sir John Glanville (1542 – 27 July 1600), the elder, of Kilworthy, Tavistock, in Devon, was an English Member of Parliament and judge and was the first judge recorded as having reached the bench after beginning his career as an attorney.

== Career ==
Born in Tavistock, he began as an attorney but joined Lincoln's Inn in 1567 and was called to the bar in 1574: his practice proved lucrative and he amassed a considerable fortune, building a mansion at Kilworthy near Tavistock. He became a serjeant-at-law in 1589, and was both Lent and Autumn Reader of his Inn in that same year. He sat as MP for Launceston in the Parliament of 1584–5, for Tavistock in 1586–7 and St Germans in 1593. He was appointed Judge of Common Pleas in 1598.

== Marriage and children ==
He married Alice Skirret by whom he had three sons and four daughters including:

- Sir John Glanville the younger, 2nd son, was also distinguished as a lawyer and was Speaker of the House of Commons in 1640.
- Joan Glanville, eldest daughter, who married Sampson Hele, MP.
- Dionis/Dewnes/Dunes (i.e. Denise) Glanville, who married Thomas Polwhele of Treworgan in Cornwall.
- Tho. Glanville, who married Jane, daughter of John Cornish of Tavistock. Their son was John Glanville of Launceston, Cornwall who married Mary, daughter of Jo. Skerret of Whitechurch. Then Christian, daughter of Jo. Eastcotte of Abottsham.

His widow Alice Skirret married Sir Francis Godolphin as her second husband.

== Death and burial ==
While riding on circuit, Sir John was killed when he fell off his horse, breaking his neck, on 27 July 1600. He was buried in Tavistock Church.
