= Spectrum (disambiguation) =

A spectrum is a set of related ideas, objects, or properties whose features overlap such that they blend to form a continuum.

Spectrum may also refer to:

== Science and technology ==
=== Physics ===
- Electromagnetic spectrum
  - Visible spectrum or optical spectrum, a subset of the electromagnetic spectrum
  - Emission spectrum, observed in light
  - Absorption spectrum, observed in light
  - Radio spectrum, radio frequency subset of the electromagnetic spectrum
  - Stellar spectrum, the combination of continuum, absorption, and emission lines produced by a star
- Energy spectrum, of a collection of particles (particle physics)
- Frequency spectrum, of a signal
- Power spectrum, of a signal

=== Medicine ===
- Spectrum disorder, a group of mental disorders of similar appearance or thought to share an underlying mechanism
  - Autism spectrum, encompassing autism, Asperger's, etc.
- Antimicrobial spectrum, the range of microorganisms an antibiotic can kill or inhibit

=== Mathematics ===
In mathematics, spectrum frequently denotes a set of numbers associated to an object:

- Spectrum of a matrix, its set of eigenvalues, in linear algebra
  - Spectrum (functional analysis), a generalization of the concept of matrix eigenvalues to operators
  - Spectrum of a graph, studied in spectral graph theory
  - Pseudospectrum
- Spectrum of a polygon, the set of numbers of possible equidissections
- Spectrum of a sentence, in mathematical logic
- Spectrum of a theory, in mathematical logic

There are also several other, unrelated meanings:

- Spectrum (topology), the fundamental object of study in stable homotopy theory
- Spectrum of a C*-algebra, a kind of dual object
- Spectrum of a ring, the set of its prime ideals, in commutative algebra

== Arts and entertainment ==
=== Publications ===
- IEEE Spectrum, a magazine by the Institute of Electrical and Electronics Engineers
- Spectrum (magazine), an independent Seventh-day Adventist magazine
- Spectrum (newspaper), a defunct Toledo, Ohio weekly newspaper
- Spectrum, a news website published by the Simons Foundation Autism Research Initiative
- The Spectrum (Utah), also known as The Spectrum & Daily News, a Gannett newspaper in St. George, Utah
- Spectrum (novel), a 2002 novel by Russian author Sergey Lukyanenko
- Spectrum, a magazine published with Scotland on Sunday
- Spectrum, a liftout in The Sydney Morning Herald

==== Student newspapers ====
- The Spectrum (NDSU), the student newspaper of the North Dakota State University in the US
- The Spectrum (University at Buffalo), the student newspaper of the State University of New York at Buffalo

=== Television ===
- Spectrum (TV channel), a defunct Chicago-area pay television broadcaster founded by United Cable
- Spectrum (TV series), a 1958 Canadian television series
- Spectrum (radio program), a daily broadcast series on CBS Radio, c. 1970–1992

=== Music ===
- The Spectrum (Sirius XM), a music channel on Sirius Satellite Radio

==== Groups ====
- Spectrum (Australian band), an Australian group of the 1970s led by Mike Rudd
- Spectrum (group), a South Korean boy group formed in 2018
- Spectrum (Japanese band), brass rock group of the 1970s
- Spectrum (The Carpenters), 1960s jazz band led by Richard and Karen Carpenter
- Spectrum, a British band led by Peter Kember
- Spectrum, a bluegrass band that included Béla Fleck and Jimmy Gaudreau
- The Spectrum, a London-based pop group that coincidentally provided the closing theme for the spectrum-themed TV show Captain Scarlet and the Mysterons

==== Albums ====
- Spectrum (Billy Cobham album), debut album of fusion drummer Billy Cobham
- Spectrum (Cedar Walton album), the second album by jazz pianist Cedar Walton
- Spectrum (Heals album), debut album of Indonesian band Heals
- Spectrum (Jega album), debut album of electronic musician Jega
- Spectrum (Steve Howe album), 2005
- Spectrum (Illinois Jacquet album), 1965
- Spectrum (Westlife album), 2019
- The Spectrum (album), of 2017 by Daley
- Spectrum (Hiromi album), 2019
- Spectrum, by iamjakehill, 2017

==== Songs ====
- "Spectrum (Say My Name)", a 2012 song by British indie rock band Florence and the Machine
- "Spectrum" (Zedd song), a 2012 song by German electronic dance music producer Zedd; also covered by SM The Performance
- "Spectrum", a 2017 song by musical artist Muzz

=== Other uses in arts and entertainment ===
- Spectrum (brand), a brand name used by Charter Communications for their telecommunication services, including:
  - Spectrum News, a group of cable news channels
  - Spectrum Sports, a group of nine regional sports networks in the US
  - Spectrum TV Stream, a streaming service
- Monica Rambeau, a Marvel Comics character who uses the name Spectrum
- Gaylactic Spectrum Awards or Spectrums, a literary award
- Spectrum, an American news website founded by the Simons Foundation Autism Research Initiative
- Spectrum, an Irish radio program hosted by Melanie Verwoerd in 2005
- Spectrum, the worldwide security organisation in the 1960s TV series Captain Scarlet and the Mysterons
- Spectrum Award, in fantasy, science fiction, and horror artwork

== Buildings and structures ==
- Spectrum (Montreal), a defunct concert venue in Canada
- Spectrum London, an art gallery in England
- Guildford Spectrum, a leisure complex in Guildford, England
- Smith Spectrum, a sports arena in Logan, Utah, US
- Spectrum (arena), a former arena in Philadelphia, Pennsylvania, US
- Spectrum Stadium, near Orlando, Florida, US
- Spectrum House, an office building in Bristol
- Northlands Spectrum, later known as Northlands Park, a horse racing track in Edmonton, Alberta, Canada

== Organizations ==
- Spectrum Aircraft, a Canadian ultralight aircraft manufacturer
- Spectrum Aeronautical, a US-based manufacturer of very light jets
- Spectrum Animation, a defunct Japanese animation studio
- Spectrum Brands, an American home-essentials company
- Spectrum Film, a former Dutch film production company founded in 1951 by Louis van Gasteren
- Spectrum Films (disambiguation), various film production companies
- Het Spectrum, a Dutch publishing company
- Spectrum Pharmaceuticals, an American biopharmaceutical company
- Spectrum (Amsterdam) (formerly Librije's Zusje), Michelin-starred restaurant in Amsterdam, the Netherlands
- Spectrum Information Technologies, a defunct American networking hardware company

== Products ==
- Spectrum (rocket)
- Spectrum, Australian racing cars manufactured by Borland Racing Developments
- Geo Spectrum or Chevrolet Spectrum, a sedan and hatchback marketed in North America
- ZX Spectrum, an early British home computer by Sinclair
- Spectrum, a brand of printer paper owned by Georgia-Pacific

== Other uses ==
- Economic spectrum, disparities between social classes
- Political spectrum, of opinion
- Spectrum Range, a mountain range in British Columbia, Canada
- Spectrum (horse), a thoroughbred racehorse
- SPECTRUM Standard, a Museum Collections Management Standard developed by the Collections Trust

== See also ==
- Spectral music
- Spector (disambiguation) or Spektor
- Spectre (disambiguation) or Specter
- Spectra (disambiguation)
- Spectral (disambiguation)
- Spektrum (disambiguation)
