= Spectre =

Spectre, specter or the spectre may refer to:

== Religion and spirituality ==
- Vision (spirituality)
- Apparitional experience
- Ghost

== Arts and entertainment ==
=== Film and television ===
- Spectre (1977 film), a made-for-television film produced and written by Gene Roddenberry
- Specters (film), a 1987 horror film starring Donald Pleasence
- Spectre (1996 film), an American-Irish horror film
- Spectres (film), a 2004 supernatural drama
- Specter (2005 film), a Japanese tokusatsu film
- DC Showcase: The Spectre, a 2010 short animated film
- Spectre (2015 film), a James Bond film
- Specter (Battlestar Galactica), a Cylon in the original Battlestar Galactica television series
- Harvey Specter, a character from the TV series Suits
- Kamen Rider Specter, a character from the tokusatsu series Kamen Rider Ghost
- The Spectres, the main protagonists of the animated TV series Star Wars Rebels

=== Music ===
- Spectre (musician), alias of producer and rapper Skiz Fernando
- The Spectre (rapper) (born 1986), British
- Akhenaton (rapper) (born 1968), French hip hop artist who uses Spectre as one of his aliases
- Spectres (album), 1977, by Blue Öyster Cult
- Spectre (Laibach album), 2014
- Spectre (Stick to Your Guns album), 2022
- "Spectre" (song), 2015 song by Radiohead
- "The Spectre" (song), 2017 song by Alan Walker
  - "Spectre", 2015 instrumental version by Alan Walker
- "Spectre", a song by Christian Death
- "Spectres", a song from the Avantasia album The Mystery of Time
- "Spectres", a song from the Black Veil Brides album The Phantom Tomorrow
- "Spectres", a song from the God Is an Astronaut album Ghost Tapes #10
- "Spectres", a song from the Humanity's Last Breath album Välde
- Spectre (soundtrack), from the 2015 James Bond movie
- "Specter" (Bad Omens song), a 2025 song by Bad Omens

=== Literature ===
- SPECTRE, an evil organisation in the James Bond novels and films
- Spectre (His Dark Materials), ghostly beings in Philip Pullman's fantasy novel trilogy
- Spectre (novel), a 1998 Star Trek novel by William Shatner
- Spectre (DC Comics character), any of several DC Comics characters
- Silk Spectre, a DC Comics character
- The Specter (novel), a 1938 novel by Maxim Gorki
- The Specters, creatures in the manga Saint Seiya and its sequel
- Specter (comics), a character in Marvel Comics

=== Video games ===
- Spectre (1982 video game), released in 1982
- Spectre (1991 video game), 1991, for the Macintosh computer
- Spectre, an elite intelligence and military unit in the series Mass Effect
- Specter, a villain in the series Ape Escape
- Spectre team, a covert ops military unit in the PlayStation 3 game Resistance 2
- Spectre, callsign of the player character in MechWarrior 4: Mercenaries
- Spectre, a cloaking sniper unit in StarCraft II: Wings of Liberty
- Spectre, callsign of a multiplayer character in Call of Duty: Black Ops III
- Specter Knight, a boss in Shovel Knight

=== Other ===
- Spectre (Blake), one of the elements of humans in William Blake's mythology
- Spectre (Dungeons & Dragons), an undead creature

== Military and aircraft ==
- USS Specter (AM-306), a minesweeper which served in World War II
- Lockheed AC-130H Spectre, an American gunship aircraft
- de Havilland Spectre, a 1950s rocket engine intended for Royal Air Force aircraft
- Spectre M4, an Italian submachine gun
- Specter Aircraft, an American aircraft manufacturer
  - Specter Aircraft Specter II, an American homebuilt aircraft design
- McDonnell Douglas F-4 Phantom II, was briefly assigned the name "F-110A Spectre" by USAF, but it was never used in practice

== Places ==
- Spectre (fictional town), an abandoned movie set located in Alabama, created for the film Big Fish
- Specter Range, a mountain range in Nevada, US
- The Spectre (Antarctica), a rock spire in the Queen Maud Mountains

== Technology ==
- HP Spectre, a Hewlett-Packard computer
- Spectre (security vulnerability), a computer security vulnerability
- Spectre Circuit Simulator, for analog integrated circuits
- Spectre GCR, an add-on cartridge to run Macintosh software on an Atari ST computer

== Other uses ==
- Specter (surname)
- Spectre (political party), in the United Kingdom
- Spectre R42, a British sports car by Spectre Supersports and Spectre Motors
- Spectre tile, an aperiodic monotile discovered in 2023

== See also ==
- Brocken spectre, the magnified shadow of an observer cast upon clouds opposite of the Sun's direction
- Rolls-Royce Spectre, Rolls-Royce's first electric vehicle
- Spectre-hound, a phantom black hound in Manx folklore, for example Moddey Dhoo
- Spector (disambiguation) (includes Spektor)
- Spectra (disambiguation)
- Spectrum (disambiguation)
- Spektre, techno music act
