= Color analysis (disambiguation) =

In cosmetics and fashion, color analysis is the process of determining the colors that best suit an individual's natural coloring.

It may also refer to:

== Art ==
- Color theory, practical methods used by visual artists to mix and harmonize colors
- Formal analysis, the analysis of the form and style of a work of art, of which analysis of color may be a part

== Science ==
- Color science, the broad scientific study of colors
- Colorimetry, the study of color perception
- Color psychology, the study of the psychological effects of color
- Spectroscopy, the study and measurement of the electromagnetic spectrum, including visible light
- In machine vision, the process of extracting environmental information via color

== See also ==
- Color symbolism
- Spectral analysis (disambiguation)
- Vision science
