= David Spector =

David Spector may refer to:

- David L. Spector (born 1952), cell and molecular biologist
- David Avraham Spector (1955–2013), Dutch-born Israeli rabbi
- Dave Spector (born 1954), American gaijin tarento (foreign TV personality) and TV producer who lives and works in Japan

== See also ==
- Dave Specter (born 1963) U.S. guitarist
- Spector (disambiguation)
