= Spectral (disambiguation) =

Spectral is a 2016 military science fiction film.

Spectral may also refer to:

- Spectral (Dave Rempis album)
- Spectral (Skyfire album)
- Spectral (computer), an East-German clone of the ZX Spectrum
- Spectral (app) IM client for the Matrix protocol
- Spectral theory, a family of mathematical theories extending the eigenvector and eigenvalue theory of a single square matrix to more generic operators
- Spectral method, a class of techniques to numerically solve certain differential equations, potentially involving the use of the Fast Fourier Transform
- Spectral analysis (disambiguation)
- Spectral, a modern serif typeface designed for long-form on-screen reading

== See also ==
- Spectrum (disambiguation)
