= Keiichi Oku =

Keiichi Oku 奥慶一
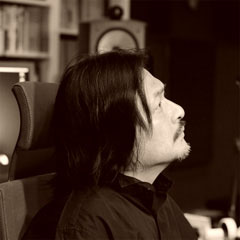

Background information
- Born: 奥慶一; October 14, 1955 (age 71); Shiga Prefecture, Japan
- Genres: Rock; Jazz fusion
- Occupations: Keyboardist; Composer; Arranger
- Instrument: Keyboard
- Years active: 1979–present
- Labels: Victor Entertainment; Nippon Columbia
- Formerly of: Spectrum
- Website: www.or-lab.com

Keiichi Oku (奥 慶一, Oku Keiichi; born October 14, 1955, in Shiga Prefecture, Japan) is a Japanese keyboardist, composer and arranger. He was the keyboardist in the Japanese band Spectrum from 1979 to 1981. In 2009, he won the JASRAC International Award for the background music used in the Ashita no Nadja anime television series from Toei Animation.

== Biography ==
Oku was born in Shiga, Japan. He graduated from the music composition program at the Tokyo University of the Arts. He was enrolled in the university's master's program but dropped out. As a grad student he performed in a backup band for Hiromi Go. On August 25, 1979, he debuted as a member of the rock band Spectrum. After Spectrum broke up in 1981, he participated in a number of recording sessions as a studio musician. Soon after, he began working as a composer and arranger for numerous artists and on March 21, 1981, he released his solo debut album Misty Morning.

As of April 2005, he serves as a guest professor at the Senzoku Gakuen College of Music for the music and sound design course.

In May 2009, he was awarded the 2008 JASRAC International Award for his music for Ashita no Nadja.

== Composer ==
=== Film ===
- Miyuki (1983, with Mitsuo Hagita)
- Bobī no Kubittake (1985)
- Ultraman Company (1996)
- Ojamajo Doremi
  - Ojamajo Doremi #: The Movie (2000)
  - Motto! Ojamajo Doremi: Secret of the Frog Stone (2001)
- Digimon Savers the Movie: Ultimate Power! Activate Burst Mode!! (2006)

=== Television ===
- Higashi Chūgaku 3-nen 5-gumi (1984)
- Wing-Man (1984-1985)
- Kinjirareta Mariko (1985-1986)
- Magical Emi, the Magic Star (1985-1986)
- Hana no Arashi (1988)
- Tatakae!! Ramenman (1988)
- Natsu no Arashi (1989, also appeared as a guest star)
- Hana no Chikai (1991)
- Saigō Satsu (1991, the "Matsumoto Seichō-sakka Katsudō 40-Shōnen Kinen Dorama Special")
- Hōkago (1992)
- Chance! (1993, additional music composer and orchestrator. Music composed by Toshinobu Kubota)
- Jaja Uma Narashi (1993, as arranger, music composed by T-Square)
- 17-sai: At Seventeen (1994)
- Seimei 40-oku Nen Haruka na Tabi (1994, NHK Special)
- Marmalade Boy (1994-1995)
- Haō Taikei Ryū Knight (1994, for the last half of the series)
- Hōdō 2001 (1997, theme song)
- Denji Sentai Megaranger (1997-1998)
- Amagigoe (1998)
- Hakui no Futari (1998)
- Ojamajo Doremi (1999-2000)
- Kiken na Shamen (2000, Matsumoto Seichō Tokubetsu Kikaku)
- Ojamajo Doremi # (2000-2001)
- Mōtto! Ojamajo Doremi (2001-2002)
- Ojamajo Doremi Dokka~n! (2002-2003)
- Ashita no Nadja (2003)
- Peacemaker Kurogane (2003-2004)
- Asutoro Kyūdan (2005)
- Digimon Data Squad (2006-2007)
- Nami no Tō (2006, Matsumoto Seichō Drama Special)
- Dream Eater Merry (2011)
- A Town Where You Live (2013)

=== Video ===
- The Good Bad Girl Again (1983)
- Fire Tripper (1985)
- Crusher Joe
  - The Ice Prison (1989)
  - The Ultimate Weapon: Ash (1989)
- Haō Taikei Ryū Knight
  - Adeu's Legend (1994-1995)
  - Adeu's Legend II (1995-1996)
  - Adeu's Legend Final - Onsen Dungeon no Kettō (1996)
- Denji Sentai Megaranger vs. Carranger (1998)
- Seijū Sentai Gingaman vs. Megaranger (1999)
- Ojamajo Doremi Na-i-sho (2004)
- Honda Legend Premium DVD (2004)
- A Town Where You Live: Twilight Intersection (2012)
- A Town Where You Live (2014)

=== Video games ===
- Arc the Lad (1995)

== Discography ==
The albums for all the works above are not currently listed here.

=== Contemporary works ===
- Illumination pour orchestre (1978, created as part of his graduation from Tokyo Geidai, only available at the university)
- Sileno - Sonata per violino e pianoforte (2011, premiered on March 8, 2012, at the 8th JFC Independent)
- Sette canzoni per bambini (2012, premiered on March 28, 2012, at the JFC solo piano concert "To the Children")
- Bridge Across Two Heavens (2015, original opera that premiered on October 11, 2015, to commemorate the opening of the Narita Cultural Art Center)

=== Original albums ===
- Misty Morning (1981, Victor)
- The Good Bad Girl (1981, Victor)
- The Good Bad Girl Again (1983, Victor)
- Ginshō: Sunset Tint (残照 Sunset Tint) (1986, Pony Canyon, Sound Museum Series 1)
