= Rotational sampling in wind turbines =

The loads on both horizontal-axis wind turbines (HAWTs) and vertical-axis wind turbines (VAWTs) are cyclic; the thrust and torque acting on the blades depend on where the blade is. In a horizontal axis wind turbine, both the apparent wind speed seen by the blade and the angle of attack depend on the blade's position. This phenomenon is described as rotational sampling. This article will provide insight into the cyclic nature of the loads that arise because of rotational sampling for a horizontal axis wind turbine.

Rotational sampling can be divided into two parts: deterministic and stochastic. Deterministic processes present themselves as spikes on a power spectrum, whereas stochastic processes spread over a wider frequency range.

== Background ==
Analysis of the loads on a wind turbine can be carried out through the use of power spectra. A power spectrum is defined as the power spectral density function of a signal plotted against frequency. The power spectral density function of a plot is defined as the Fourier transform of the covariance function. Regarding the analysis of loads, it involves time series, in which case the covariance function becomes the autocovariance function. In the signal processing sense, the autocovariance can be related to the autocorrelation function.

== Deterministic processes ==
=== Sources of deterministic processes ===
Upon completing a single revolution, a blade has produced an ever-changing torque, and so power. Some of these changes are due to deterministic processes, i.e., processes that can be determined and do not require statistical methods. Examples of deterministic processes are listed below:

- Gravitational loading
- Tower shadow
- Wind shear

==== Gravitational loading ====
As a blade sweeps through each cycle, gravity is acting on the blade. Depending on the part of the cycle, gravity might be acting to accelerate the blade, or decelerate it. The additional torque that arises on a blade due to gravity is given by

$T_{grav} = rmg\cos(\Omega_0t)$

where r is the length of the blade, m is the mass of the blade, g is the gravitational field strength, t is the time, and $\Omega_0$ is the angular velocity of the blade.

==== Tower shadow ====
In fluid dynamics, the flow of a fluid is dependent upon boundary conditions. Boundary conditions are influenced by the presence of solid bodies. In a wind turbine, the presence of the tower results in a reduction of the wind speed directly in front of it; that is, the blades experience a reduced wind speed when they pass in front of the tower.

==== Wind shear ====
In fluid dynamics, there exists the no slip boundary condition. This states that the velocity of a fluid at the surface of a solid body, such as the Earth, is zero. A consequence of that is that the wind speed varies with height above ground. This effect is known as wind shear. As a result, a blade at the highest part of its cycle will experience a greater wind speed than that of one at the lowest part of its cycle.

=== Power spectral density functions ===
==== Drivetrain components ====
The drivetrain of a wind turbine comprises the hub, the low speed shaft, the gearbox, the high speed shaft, and the generator. The torque at the hub is strongly influenced by the rotor dynamics. The instantaneous hub torque is found by summing all the torques from all the blades of the wind turbine at any instant in time.

Consider an $n$ bladed wind turbine. Each blade is separated angularly from a neighboring blade by $360/n$ degrees. That is, for a 3-bladed wind turbine, the blades are 120 degrees apart.

The torque acting on the blade is defined as the z-component of $\textbf{r}\times\mathbf{F}$, where r is the radius from the axis of rotation (in this case the hub), and F is the force acting on the blade. If the torque is defined as the z-component of this cross product, then the torque is simply rF_{perp} where F_{perp} is the force perpendicular to the radius vector, or tangential to the instantaneous velocity of the blade (See figure below)

From the figure above, it can be seen that the torque, T, due to gravitational forces acting on a single blade is given by the following expression:

$T_{grav} = \sum_{k}rmg\cos(k\Omega_0t)$	1

where m is the mass of the blade, g is the gravitational field strength, k is a multiplicative integer, $\Omega_0$ is the angular velocity of the blade, and t is the time.

For an n-bladed rotor, the instantaneous torque at the hub from all n blades by gravity is determined by summing the effects of all the blades at any one instant. Remembering that the blades are offset from each other by 360/n, the instantaneous torque at the hub from gravity is given by the following expression:

$T_{grav} = \sum_k \left(rmg\cos(k\Omega_0t) + rmg\cos(k\Omega_0t - 360/n) + rmg\cos(k\Omega_0t - 2(360/n)) + \dots\right)$

Simple trigonometry reveals that only non-zero terms arise when k is a multiple of n. Thus, the overall effect of gravity on the torque at the hub is

$T_{grav} = n\sum_{k = 1}\cos(nk\Omega_0t)$

The covariance function of a sum of sinusoids is itself a sum of sinusoidal functions. Thus, the power spectral density function is a set of Dirac delta functions. The locations of these are at multiples of n. Thus, on a power spectrum, deterministic processes such as gravitational loading manifest themselves as spikes. This can be seen from analysing generator torque.

==== Blades ====
For analysis of torque on a single blade, the spikes occur at $k'\Omega_0$ where k' is 1,2,3,.. This can be seen from taking the autocovariance of equation 1, and then taking the Fourier transform of this result.

== Structural loads ==
Spectral analysis of component loading is useful in fatigue analysis.
