= Specter (surname) =

Specter is a Dutch surname. It is also of Ashkenazic Jewish origin, an occupational name of a teacher's assistant. It is also derivative of the Polish word inspektor, meaning supervisor.

Notable people with this name include:

- Arlen Specter (1930–2012), American politician and lawyer, member of the US Senate
- Dave Specter (born 1963), American Chicago blues and jazz guitarist
- Joan Specter (1934–2024), American businessperson and politician, widow of Arlen
- Michael Specter (born 1955), American journalist
- Ronnie Specter, American make-up artist

== Fictional characters ==
- Harvey Specter, the main character of the television series Suits

== See also ==
- Spector (disambiguation), which includes a list of people with the surname
