= Ashita no Nadja =

Japanese anime television series

- Japanese manga cover of Ashita no Nadja volume 1
- 明日のナージャ
- Genre: Historical
- Created by: Izumi Todo
- Developed by: Tomoko Konparu
- Directed by: Takuya Igarashi
- Music by: Keiichi Oku
- Country of origin: Japan
- Original language: Japanese
- No. of episodes: 50

Production
- Producers: Moegi Nishizawa (ABC); Tomoko Takahashi (Asatsu-DK); Hiromi Seki (Toei Animation)
- Production companies: ABC; Asatsu-DK; Toei Animation

Original release
- Network: ANN (ABC, TV Asahi)
- Release: February 2, 2003 – January 25, 2004

Related
- Manga
- Written by: Izumi Todo
- Illustrated by: Yui Ayumi
- Published by: Kodansha
- Magazine: Nakayoshi
- Original run: February 3, 2003 – December 29, 2003
- Volumes: 2
- Novel

Ashita no Nadja - 16-sai no Tabidachi
- Written by: Tomoko Konparu
- Illustrated by: Kazuto Nakazawa
- Published by: Kodansha
- Published: September 12, 2017

Ashita no Nadja (明日のナージャ, Ashita no Nāja; lit. 'Tomorrow's Nadja') is a Japanese anime television series produced by Toei Animation and aired between February 2, 2003, and January 25, 2004, on ABC, TV Asahi and other ANN affiliates. A manga version, written by Izumi Todo and drawn by Yui Ayumi, was serialized by Kodansha in the manga magazine Nakayoshi from March 2003 to February 2004, and collected in two bound volumes.

A sequel novel was released on September 12, 2017.

== Plot ==
Nadja is an orphan who lives at the Applefield Orphanage, in early 20th-century England. Nadja is called by Miss Appleton, the orphanage's owner, to receive a package delivered to her. The gifts sent for her thirteenth birthday are a dress and a diary. She is told in the accompanying letter that her mother is still alive. She later joins a traveling street performance act called the Dandelion Troupe in search of her mother after a fire breaks out in her orphanage. She travels the world, finding many friends along the way that teach her things about herself, ultimately having to learn the truth about her parentage and discovering her own destiny.

== Characters ==
Left to right: Thomas O'Brien, George Haskill, Creme, Nadja Applefield, Rita Rossi, Anna Petrova, Chocolat, Abel Geiger, Kennosuke Tsurugi, and Sylvie Arte

=== Dandelion Troupe ===
Nadja Applefield (ナージャ・アップルフィールド, Nāja Appurufīrudo)
Voiced by: Ami Koshimizu

Nadja Applefield is a Franco-Austrian orphan who takes care of other orphans and shows a natural talent for dancing. Despite being extroverted and gullible, she is depicted as impulsive and manipulable. She has one main aim in her life – to search for her mother and be reunited with her.

Nadja was given to Miss Applefield to raise when she was a baby, her only possession at the time being an elaborate heart-shaped brooch. Nadja grew up at the orphanage believing her parents were dead; in the days before her 13th birthday, Nadja received a surprising gift in the mail: a trunk containing a ball gown and diary, both keepsakes belonging to her birth mother. The gown was worn by Nadja's mother at her first ball, and the diary was her mother's colorful description of all the people she met and danced with at that ball. Nadja is amazed by this gift, and stunned to discover that her mother might actually be alive out there somewhere. When bad men arrive to steal the brooch away from Nadja, she leaves the Applefield orphanage and begins a career as a dancer with the travelling Dandelion Troupe. Her true date of birth is unknown, even by Nadja herself, but she claims it to be on July 25.

In episode 40 of the series, she departs for England leaving Dandelion Troupe to look for witnesses to testify her identity, after finding out that her former friend Rosemary was impersonating her and was spending time with her mother. Early in the series, she meets the Harcourt twins, Francis and Keith. She initially feels attached to Francis and once mistook Keith for Francis. Halfway through the series, she seems to be falling in love with Keith, as Francis tells him, even though she doesn't confess or seems unaware of her true feelings. She is ultimately forced to choose between them romantically. Near the end of the series, she chooses Francis over Keith because she thinks that he was the first person to help her. Indeed, the first person to help her was Keith. Since she is confused about her feelings, she chooses Francis, but later comes to realize the one that she loves is Keith. Francis is the one that makes her realize it. In the end, she did not choose either one and re-joined the Dandelion Troupe. It is hinted that she will make another decision. Interestingly, she is very popular among the males of the show, with Francis, Keith, Christian, Kennosuke, Oliver, TJ, and Fernando all developing crushes on her.

George Haskill (ゲオルグ・ハスキル, Georugu Hasukiru)
Voiced by: Kazuya Ichijo

George is vigorous and trusting; his co-workers often call him 'Dancho' ("master") due to his leadership skills. He is the unofficial head of the Dandelion Troupe and a good friend to Raphael, the free-spirited troubador. George is the "gentle strongman" and leader of the Dandelion Troupe; the car they all travel in appears to belong to him, and he is the one who decides where they will travel to next.

George is gruff and macho, but he has his weaknesses as well. He is extremely superstitious and addicted to treasure hunting, and cannot turn down maps offered to him. His treasure hunting passion has dragged the Troupe off course in their travels several times. It is unclear if his treasure hunting exploits have actually yielded treasure, but George is always keen on going after the next treasure on the horizon.

Anna Petrova (アンナ・ペトロワ, Anna Betorowa) / Granny (おばば, Obaba)
Voiced by: Hisako Kyouda

A mysterious, kindly Russian old lady who makes extravagant hats or hair ornaments for dukes and nobles. She knitted a dress for Nadja as soon as she tried to join the troupe (as well as other dancing outfits for her and Kennosuke), and it is likely that she is the primary source of income for the Dandelion Troupe, along with donations.

Anna is a mysterious character: she is sort of a grandmotherly figure for everyone in the Troupe, yet none of them are really sure just how old she is. Anna sews all the costumes for the Troupe (though it seems that Nadja and Kennosuke are the only ones who occasionally change costume) and she operates the phonograph mounted on the top of the car. She's also good at handling money, always getting discounts and lower prices.

Anna has a side business of making fashionable hats for noblewomen, and occasionally the Dandelion car must detour so Anna can deliver a hat to a buyer. In fact, Nadja and Francis meet each other thanks to Anna delivering a hat for Francis' aunt, Emma. Anna is a fortune teller; she know right away after she first sees Nadja that fate has adventures in store for her, and throughout the series she always seems to know when important things will happen to Nadja. She is an unexpectedly good fighter, due to her small size and skill with her deadly iron pan. Although celebrated in one of the episodes, Anna's birthday is never mentioned, but it's supposedly at the same day as Nadja's unknown yet true birthday, as her mother celebrates it at that same day.

Sylvie Arte (シルヴィー・アルテ, Shiruvī Arute)
Voiced by: Fumiko Orikasa

The French singer for the Dandelion Troupe. Somewhat of a "skeptical and exigent lady" when it comes to performing abilities, she takes kindly to Nadja when she proves her worth as a performer, and takes her under her wing openly in France. Sylvie is the "songbird" of the Dandelion Troupe; her voice and looks captivate her audience wherever she goes. Sylvie is a sort of an older sister figure for Nadja while they are on the road, giving Nadja advice, and is someone Nadja can turn to with her emotional problems.

Sylvie can be frivolous at times; she's vain about her looks, likes going shopping, like other girls her age, and at one point she is seen dating Antonio Fabiani, a shady character, but she also has romantic problems of her own; she suffers an unrequited love for Raphael, a traveling musician and friend of the Dandelion Troupe, who currently cannot correspond her feelings due to his past. Sylvie is also a good fighter, thanks to her ability to use her umbrella as a weapon.

Abel Geiger (アーベル・ガイガー, Āberu Gaigā)
Voiced by: Takumi Yamazaki

Abel is German and works as the Pierrot of the Troupe, in charge of comedy and laughter. He wears clown make-up while on stage, and performs all kinds of amusing antics such as juggling, acrobatics and standing on a large ball. Even though he is the Pierrot, Abel can be very serious and wise at times. He is a well-educated man, somewhat of a scholar and mentor figure; he helps Nadja to look for books in libraries and reads her mother's diary, which is written in German, a language Nadja does not know since she has been raised in England.

Behind Abel's Pierrot make-up lies a sad past and a family he had to leave behind; he was the doctor of an impoverished village, but spent a time in jail after stealing medicine from an hospital to save his patients from an epidemic and had to abandon his family after his release, since his son Stefan had the illness and used a wheelchair.

Thomas O'Brien (トーマス・オブライアン, Tōmasu Oburaian)
Voiced by: Daisuke Kishio

A gentle Irish musician, Thomas plays the violin for the Dandelion Troupe. He is quiet and talented and dedicated to his music; one of the times Thomas really gets angry is when someone insults his music and his playing, like genius pianist John Whittard does. Thomas gives Nadja her first dancing prop: a baton of sorts that has a matching castagnet that attaches to one end, and a belled piece that attaches to the other end.

Another thing about Thomas is his practicality; he is gentle and quiet, but he is down to earth when it comes to day-to-day life, becoming concerned about how the Troupe earns money and the success of their performances. He is rather cowardly when faced with violence and physical danger, and at those times Abel and Sylvie give him alcohol to make him overcome his fear.

Kennosuke Tsurugi (ケンノスケ・ツルギ)
Voiced by: Reiko Kiuchi

A descendant of samurais, Kennosuke set off to Europe from Japan after being orphaned, determined to get money for himself and his sister Hanako. His dream is to become either a good samurai or an aviator, since one of his first bosses in Japan was a dreamy inventor who wanted to fly. In England, he sneaks into the Dandelion Troupe's car and accidentally sets a whole disaster, but is forgiven and joins the company.

On stage, he usually performs dance and/or fighting sequences with his bokken (wooden sword), and occasionally joins Nadja in her own dance acts. He has a crush on Nadja, usually portrayed as a running gag more than a serious issue; whatever the source of those feelings is, he always acts as her best friend. He is a skilled mechanic who maintains the Dandelion Troupe's car.

Rita Rossi (リタ・ロッシ, Rita Rosshi)
Voiced by: Ikue Ohtani

A young Italian girl, who is a mute, she communicates with Nadja and Kennosuke quite easily, regardless.

Rita was orphaned when her parents (lion tamers, who raised her in the circus life) died in a fire that consumed their circus two years before Nadja's arrival. That tragic incident robbed her of the ability to speak and left her with an absolute fear of fire. After the death of her parents, Rita was adopted by the Dandelion Troupe (who witnessed the tragedy), and performs on stage with the twin lions Creme (who is white) and Chocolat (who is white like his sibling, but is dyed black by George). Despite time passing, neither of the lions seems mature. With Nadja's help, Rita comes to terms with her trauma and gradually starts talking again.

=== Applefield Orphanage ===
Rosemary (ローズマリー, Roozumarii)
Voiced by: Rumi Shishido

A childhood friend of Nadja in the Applefield Orphanage. While Nadja is the type to always run around climbing trees with the boys, Rosemary is more dreamy and would rather watch from afar. Secretly, Rosemary is unhappy about her status as an orphan, and always likes to fantasize that she is really a beautiful princess who was lost by her family, and who will be rescued any day now (in fact, she at times refers to herself as 'Princess Rosemary'). Nadja played along with Rosemary's dreams by calling Rosemary 'princess' and pretending to be her faithful knight.

When Rosemary turns 13, she, like all Applefield children, has to leave the orphanage and get a job. She works first as the maid of a wealthy family in Spain, and later as a lady-in-waiting for the scheming Herman Preminger, who disguises her as Nadja for his own purposes. Rosemary sees her second job as a way to make her own princess dreams finally come true at any costs even if it hurts Nadja, whom she sees as a traitor after a tragic misunderstanding that happens when they re-meet in Spain, months after they parted.

Rosemary originally is a good-hearted girl with hidden self-worth issues, but she soon develops an extremely nasty and cruel personality after her trust with Nadja shatters, resorting to practically anything to get what she sees as revenge. Believing that Nadja had betrayed her and seeing that her dream is at the grasp of her fingers, Rosemary becomes active and manipulative and at times even reaches levels of madness and scheming that are scary for a 13-year-old girl. Even Herman starts to fear her at one point, since he knows Rosemary is perfectly able and willing to use his weaknesses against him if needed.

In the end, Rosemary recovers her dignity and becomes tired of all the lies and manipulations, realizing that even in achieving victory through them that she is empty and unsatisfied. After speaking to Nadja one last time, she leaves the Preminger manor to "build her own princess castle", in her own words.

=== Preminger and Colorado clans ===
Duke Preminger
Voiced by: Eiji Maruyama

A prominent Austrian nobleman, he is the father of Collette and Herman, and the grandfather of Nadja. Characterized by his pride, cold demeanor, and preoccupation with family honor, he demonstrates affection primarily toward Oscar and Collette.

Raymond Colbert, Nadja's father, worked for the Duke and was fired when Collette asked for permission to marry him, which was refused. As a result, the two eloped. Raymond died in an accident while both Collette and Nadja were very sick. The Duke told his retainers to give baby Nadja away to a friend of theirs, Miss Applefield, and tell Collette that her child had perished, thus tricking her into coming back home.

Duke Preminger also hires two private investigators, Rosso and Bianco, to gather information about Nadja's life to see if she is worthy of joining the Preminger clan. It's hinted that he is, in fact, the one who sent Nadja the gown and the diary. Unbeknownst to him, Rosso and Bianco are actually working with his son Herman to eliminate Nadja, making Herman the family heir.

Collette Preminger
Voiced by: Reiko Yasuhara

Nadja's mother, whose pink gown and diary were sent to Nadja around her 13th birthday, Collette is the eldest daughter of the rich Austrian nobleman Duke Preminger. She eloped with Raymond, a French musician and her piano teacher, when her father fired him after learning they were involved. They lived happily in poverty in Paris until Raymond died in an accident, while both Nadja and Collette were very ill at the time. The Duke's retainers gave Nadja to the orphanage and told Collette that she had died. The grief-stricken Collette was easily convinced to return home where she has lived a quiet life in the company of her father, second husband (her old friend, Count Waltmüller, a good man who takes care of her very well) and younger brother Herman.

Collette is similar to Nadja in the way that she is trusting, good-hearted, stubborn when she wants to be, and slightly klutzy at times. They cross paths several times not knowing that they're mother and daughter until almost the end.

Herman Preminger
Voiced by: Issei Futamata

Nadja's uncle and son of Duke Preminger, who openly scorned his son after he failed to meet his expectations and almost impoverished the clan with his poor financial decisions. As a result, Herman became a cynical, scheming, money- and power-hungry man who only wants to disprove Nadja's worth as the possible future heiress of the Premingers. He first sends the private detectives Rosso and Bianco to steal Nadja's brooch, and later hires Rosemary to pose as Nadja - a move he would later regret, as Rosemary proves to be less tractable than he thought and whenever he threatens to expose her as a fraud she reminds him he cannot do it without getting himself into bigger trouble for being responsible for this hoax.

Near the end of the series, it's revealed that, as a result of being forced to train in order to one day succeed his father, Herman never had a chance to make friends during his whole childhood and that he resents Nadja because she was chosen over him despite having a happy childhood.

Eventually, Rosso and Bianco start taking advantage of Herman, forcing him to buy things for them as he cannot let his father find out about them. As a revenge, when they lock Nadja in Herman's mansion catacombs, Herman locks them in with her. Rosso and Bianco betray Herman and let Nadja escape so that she can expose Herman's plans. In the end, Herman is arrested and, despite his pleas, his father refuses to pay for his release, disowns him as his son and leaves him imprisoned.

Oscar Colorado
Voiced by: Tomokazu Seki

Herman's stepson, son of his wife Hilda, Oscar does not get along with his stepfather, but Collette and the Duke like him. In fact, Oscar's lack of Preminger blood is the only thing keeping him from consideration as the Duke's heir but he does not seem to care about it. He is cares for Collette, who may look to him as a surrogate for Nadja. In fact, the viewer learns of Nadja's true past when Collette is shown telling Oscar her story. Oscar is protective of his mother Hilda, a sweet and still-young woman trapped in an unhappy marriage with Herman, who abuses her psychologically and once even physically.

Oscar is nice and gentle, but can have a devious side as well. When he attends a ball where Herman expected him to find a rich girl to marry. He instead meets people who tell him that, in order to finance his search for Nadja, Herman borrowed money from Antonio Fabiani and that he now avoids meeting his creditor since he missed the deadline to pay the debt and still does not have enough money to do so. Oscar then arranges a meeting between Antonio and Herman who says that he will be able to repay his debt as soon as he inherits his father's fortune. Antonio suggests discussing that matter with Duke Preminger and Herman asks him not to do so. Oscar tells Antonio he "hates guys like him" and only arranged the meeting because he intends to use "poison against poison".

Oscar is an heir of the Colorado clan, which owns the mansion where Herman lives, and has enough money to pay Herman's debt but Oscar will not do it unless Herman agrees to leave Hilda and the Colorado mansion forever.

=== Harcourt clan ===
Francis Harcourt
Voiced by: Mitsuki Saiga

He is the son of a wealthy English nobleman, raised by his kind aunt Emma Queensbury after his mother died. Unlike other nobles, he does not believe in social classes and differences, so under the 'noblesse oblige' motto he becomes an active advocate for charity and a sort of kind, sweet guardian angel for the poor. He is extremely focused in this work to the point of being somewhat workaholic, therefore ignoring the affections of girls like his close friend Marianne Hamilton.

Francis and Nadja meet in a charity ball, bonding through their common memories and crossing paths many times as they separately travel through Europe. While still good-hearted, Francis is not as ultra-perfect as he seems, especially since he has serious self-worth problems regarding both his own persona and someone he dearly loves, as well as heavy guilt trips that arise when he sees that his good intentions aren't enough to make the poor happier. He and Keith fall in love with Nadja, but he is aware that Nadja's affections are for Keith and accepts it. In episode 44, Nadja is forced to choose between Keith or Francis. In the end of that episode, she chooses Francis, but in episode 50 when she is talking with her mother, she talks about how she is "has not come to recognize her own feelings anymore". This along with a scene later on in the episode when the Harcourt twins stated that they will "play fair" for the love of Nadja concludes that Nadjas love interest has actually not been chosen.

Keith Harcourt (a.k.a. the Black Rose)
Voiced by: Mitsuki Saiga

The Black Rose is a dashing, handsome and mysterious thief who steals from the rich and gives the stolen wealth to the poor, since he believes that all the wealthy people are frivolous and self-centered. He is well loved by the crowd, and famous among the journalists. His trademarks are his black costume with cape, mask, and calling card that he uses to taunt his future victims. He crosses paths with Nadja several times during her travels with the Dandelion Troupe; she is at first enraged by his dry wit and exploits, but later learns his motives and starts to empathize more with him.

The Black Rose's true identity is revealed mid-way in the series. His true name is Keith Harcourt, and he is the older twin brother of Francis, who walked away from his family after he finished his schooling at age 15. He shares his twin's desire to help the poor, but is far more cynical and disenchanted, since he thinks that 'noblesse oblige' is insufficient. The death of their mother had an influence; while the more innocent Francis saw only Countess Harcourt's kinder side, Keith saw her secret unhappiness upon being a bird in a gilded cage. Nadja's love of freedom touches him so much that he appoints himself as her protector after he rescues her from Rosso and Bianco. Like his brother, he falls in love with Nadja as he protects her and is drawn to her personality. In episode 44, Nadja is forced to choose between Keith or Francis. In the end of that episode, she chooses Francis, but in episode 50 when she is talking with her mother, she talks about how she is "has not come to recognize her own feelings anymore". This along with a scene later on in the episode when the Harcourt twins stated that they will "play fair" for the love of Nadja concludes that Nadjas love interest has actually not been chosen.

=== Others ===
Harvey Livingston
Voiced by: Kenjiro Tsuda

A friendly, lanky and talented American journalist who works for a French newspaper, and due to his work he travels through Europe searching for the most outrageous news. He is one of the first people to give Nadja serious hints about her true origins; he examines her brooch during their meeting in Italy and, noting its craftsmanship, deduces that she is of very noble origin and warns her of how serious a matter it could be.

Despite his lazy outlook, Harvey is extremely serious when it comes to his work. He also has a strong sense of justice and greatly admires the thief Black Rose; one of his most cherished dreams is to interview him. He has looked after his little brother, T.J., ever since they were orphaned.

Marianne Hamilton
Voiced by: Fuuko Misaki

Marianne is the daughter of another English noble clan, who has known Francis Harcourt since childhood and has loved him since then. In fact, the Hamilton and Harcourt families were planning to engage Marianne and Francis, but Nadja's appearance disrupts these plans.

While she makes clear to Nadja that she will not give Francis up to her and says that Nadja is better off with Keith, upon hearing her family plea Marianne accepts to help Nadja and Francis to prove Nadja's bond to the Premingers, wanting to see if she really is who she claims to be, and even saying that if Nadja truly is a Preminger, she will cancel her engagement to Francis.

Marianne is painted as a morally ambiguous character with both good (focused, honest and straightforward) and bad (manipulative and possessive of Francis) traits. She is less malicious than Rosemary and Herman, but still not completely good. Despite her selfishness, she seems to truly care for Francis, as seen in a scene with Nadja where Marianne blurts out that Nadja has Keith and the Dandelion Troupe while she only has Francis to hold on to, and runs away from Nadja almost in tears.

Antonio Fabiani
Voiced by: Ryo Horikawa

Cynical and greedy, Antonio was raised by his widowed mother, Irma, in the slums of Venice. He left home at age 16 and gradually grew up into a disenchanted, selfish, cold businessman, who apparently won his wealth through extremely shady deals, which may or may not have included scams.

Antonio and Nadja have butted heads several times. Nadja met him when he was courting a rich girl who rejected him and he tried to silence her with money, which Nadja angrily refused. She continued to think poorly of Antonio until she learned of his past from Irma. It's later revealed that Herman Preminger owed him a large sum of money (Herman borrowed the money so he could bribe his father's detectives). Duke Preminger paid off the debt and then disowned his son.

Antonio seems to be somewhat of a ladies' man, going out with Sylvie once in a while (it's hinted that he occasionally helps the Dandelion Troupe with their finances) and openly courting the heiress Julietta, with a notable lack of success.

Fernando Gonzales
Voiced by: Naozumi Takahashi

Fernando Gonzales is the son of a wealthy Spanish noble family, and all his life he has been pampered and spoiled. This resulted in Fernando's petty, malicious personality. Fernando finds Nadja attractive (in a snotty rich kid way) but instead of being nice to her, he bosses her around and publicly humiliates her by forcing her to attend a masked ball as an entertainer, and later blackmailing her into attending another ball at his own house. His family also happened to employ Rosemary after she left the orphanage. Rosemary has a huge crush on Fernando, but his mean attitude towards her and his "niceness" towards Nadja is one of the things that causes Rosemary's betrayal.

Raphael, the troubadour
Voiced by: Kouji Yamamoto

A kind-hearted and wise man, he's a traveling musician and a long-time friend of the Dandelion Troupe. Once he and a young noblewoman eloped, but she was taken ill and died. Since then, Raphael sings beautiful love songs but, believing it's his fault that his wife died and not wishing to inflict such pain on anybody else, refuses to become involved with another woman. Sylvie knows his sad history and has fallen deeply in love with him despite knowing that her love will never be requited. He counsels Nadja on occasion, telling her that she has beautiful wings.

Christian Strand

Christian is a kind and klutzy Egyptologist who keeps bumping into Nadja. He develops feelings for Nadja, but due to her involvement with the Harcourt twins, he never really gets to tell her. Christian was a street child with a great love of knowledge; a kind professor saw him in the Museum where he worked and took him in as his pupil and, later, heir. Several years previously, Christian's landlady worked for Duke Preminger, and was one of the people who gave the baby Nadja to Miss Applefield. She also helps the Duke send Collette's trunk to Nadja at the orphanage.

Leonardo Capinale

A young noble with a good heart, he is a womanizer who often shows up with different women in tow and often meets Nadja, calling her My Little Rosebud despite her complaints. Nonetheless, he is a frequent ally to Nadja and her search for his mother. He is engaged to a woman named Julietta since birth who has feelings for him but he often plays around because he wants the desire to be free before he marries.

Thierry

A close friend of Leonardo who helps him assist Nadja in searching for her mother and is his close confidant.

TJ

Harvey's younger brother who has a small boyish crush on Nadja and a rivalry/friendship with Kennosuke. He looks up to Harvey.

Oliver

One of Nadja's friends from her orphanage. After the orphanage was burned down, his master from his previous job in London found him a factory job in France. He has a crush on her and tries several times to confess (especially in episode 11) but in the end fails and reaffirms their relationship as family. He currently works under a saddle maker.

Julietta

A noblewoman and friend of Nadia, she is Leonardo's fiancée due to an arranged marriage by their parents decided at their birth. She is a kind gentle woman who has loved Leonardo but he initially did not return her affection and also flirted with many women, saying he didn't want to be tied down. Antonio later pursued her to obtain her social status but later grew to fall for her. Leonardo then began to see her as a woman. She meets with Nadia in episode 44 and gives advice on who to choose between Keith and Francis. Julietta herself says she chose the person she fell for not the one who fell for her.

== Media ==
=== Anime ===
Produced by Toei Animation, the series is directed by Takuya Igarashi, with Tomoko Konparu handling series composition, Kazuto Nakazawa designing the characters and Keiichi Oku composing the music. It is available on DVD in 13 volumes (in Japanese) containing two to three episodes each, released from September 2003 to September 2004. A DVD box was released on February 10, 2016. It is also available on SD Blu-ray in a Blu-ray box that was released on July 26, 2023. It has also been released on French-Canadian R1 DVD by Imavision as "Nadja Applefields" in two boxsets, the first with the first 26 episodes released on September 25, 2007, and the second with the last 24 episodes released on April 29, 2008. It has also received two English-dubbed compilation films titled "The Adventures Of Nadja" from William Winckler Productions and Toei. The first of the films are a compilation of episodes 6, 7, 10, 13 and 21, while the second is a compilation of the last five episodes of the series. The opening theme is "Nadja!!" (ナージャ!!) by Minako Honda, and the ending theme is "Que Sera, Sera" (けせら・せら) by Ami Koshimizu.

No.	Title	Directed by	Written by	Original release date
1	"Nadja, Door of Destiny!!"; Transliteration: "Nāja, Unmei no Tobira!!" (Japanese: ナージャ、運命の扉！！)	Takuya Igarashi	Tomoko Konparu	2 February 2003
Nadja Applefield and the Applefield Orphanage are introduced. Nadja is summoned to receive a package of gifts for her 13th birthday (a dress and a diary), and reads in the accompanying letter that her mother is still alive. The arrival in town of the Dandelion Troupe for a dance performance is misinterpreted by two goons, Rosso and Bianco, who set fire to the orphanage.
2	"Night of the Phantom Thief Black Rose"; Transliteration: "Kaitō Kuro Bara no Yoru" (Japanese: 怪盗黒バラの夜)	Akinori Yabe	Yoshimi Narita	9 February 2003
After nearly being barbecued and abducted by the clumsy Rosso and Bianco and driven by family politics she knows nothing about, Nadja finds herself in the Dandelion Troupe. Escaping from the perplexed troupe, she determines to find her mother. The Dandelion Troupe wants Nadja to join them, although the goons will see her onstage. Herman Preminger wants to inherit the duchy from his father. Nadia goes to London, where Rita's twin lions' chasing a mouse introduces Nadja to a phantom thief (Black Rose). The thief advise Nadja not to travel at night.
3	"Samurai Kennosuke's Wild Ride"; Transliteration: "Samurai Kennosuke Daibōsō!" (Japanese: サムライ・ケンノスケ大暴走)	Yoshihiro Oka	Takashi Yamada	16 February 2003
Nadja is fuming over the Black Rose's advice against nighttime travel. Alcoholic American news reporter Harvey Livingston is hard at work investigating the Dandelion Troupe. The curiosity of a young samurai, Kennosuke Tsurugi, looses the Happy Carrier Car around London with Rita inside. Nadja sees the old woman, Edna, who delivered her to the orphanage as a baby. Although the Dandelion Troupe considers the runaway car good publicity, Rita learns from Kennosuke that he regrets his actions. Harvey helps stop the runaway car after it nearly runs over Nadja; Kennosuke finds a new home in the troupe, and Harvey continues working on his upcoming article about the whole misadventure.
4	"Dancing Princess Nadja and the Mummy Professor"; Transliteration: "Maihime Nāja to Mīra Hakase" (Japanese: 舞姫ナージャとミイラ博士)	Yasuo Yamayoshi	Yumi Kageyama	23 February 2003
Nadja is nervous about dancing when she meets Christian Strand, an ambitious, clumsy archeology student. He finds Nadja attractive, and the troupe revels in its success. While the adult troupe members worry about George's leading them on another needless treasure hunt or Kennosuke and Rita breaking something, Nadja goes on a date with Christian. George races back to the troupe with a treasure map.
5	"The Starry Night: A Waltz Just for Two"; Transliteration: "Hoshi no Yoru: Futaridake no Warutsu" (Japanese: 星の夜・二人だけのワルツ)	Mamoru Hosoda	Tomoko Konparu	2 March 2003
Nadja's enjoyment of Francis' riding (and the mansion's opulence) is ruined when she must return to the troupe with Granny Anna. Nadja is mistaken for a servant by a maid, Martha. In the Happy Carrier Car, Nadja remembers conversing with Francis while dancing at the ball (although he does not).
6	"The Diary of the Ball That Ties Mother and Daughter"; Transliteration: "Hahako o musubu butōkai no Nikki" (Japanese: 母子を結ぶ舞踏会の日記)	Takao Iwai	Akatsuki Yamatoya	9 March 2003
Nadja's visit to England encourages her to describe what is important to her in her diary, while George's announcement that they have reached the Eiffel Tower alerts her that she is no longer in her native England. Nadja's dancing attracts a boy, TJ Livingston, who becomes Kennosuke's rival. They dislike each other, which Nadja tries to discourage by asking them to search for paintER Alphonse Jean Maley. Although their search is fruitless, a little girl (Madeleine) is looking for her mother. The three reunite Madeleine with her mother and find Maley, who gives Nadja a pencil sketch and information about her mother.
7	"The Masquerade Ball Trap"; Transliteration: "Kamenbutōkai no Wana" (Japanese: 仮面舞踏会のワナ)	Naoyuki Itō	Yumi Kageyama	16 March 2003
As the Black Rose (in France) retrieves a painting from a white-collar criminal, Lubich, the mute Rita is nearly hit by a car. The car's aristocratic passengers, Simone Monterlant and her nephew Fernando Gonzales, hire Nadja to dance at their upcoming masquerade ball. At the ball, Fernando drags her off so two guests (Leonardo Cardinale and his dressmaker friend, Thierry Rothschild) try to make her into an aristocratic young lady before the Black Rose waltzes with her.
8	"A Broken Wing and Tears of Love"; Transliteration: "Oreta tsubasa to Koi no Namida" (Japanese: 折れた翼と恋の涙)	Shigeyasu Yamauchi	Yoshimi Narita	23 March 2003
Nadja sees Rita greet a traveling minstrel, Raphael, who is apparently known to the Dandelion Troupe. When she hears Raphael improvise song lyrics, Sylvie relives the anguished last moments of the romantic relationship she used to have with him. Nadja learns from Sylvie that love is private and complicated. Sylvie and Raphael sing for Nadja.
9	"The Troubled, Genius Pianist"; Transliteration: "Nayameru tensai pianisuto!" (Japanese: 悩める天才ピアニスト)	Akinori Yabe	Tomoko Konparu	30 March 2003
Nadja is writing in her diary when Granny Anna asks her to help deliver hats to Mireille Moreau. Mireille introduces Nadja to a pianist, John Whittard, who composing. Leonardo and Thierry greet Nadja noisily, which annoys John. Kennosuke, homesick, wants rice for lunch (as does Nadja) when Rita notices that John is about to jump into the river; Créme and Chocolat rescue him. Nadja has tea with John, and they are joined by Francis.
10	"Music Box with Memories for Two"; Transliteration: "Futatsu no omoide orugōru" (Japanese: ふたつの想い出オルゴール)	Yukihiko Nakao	Takashi Yamada	6 April 2003
Satisfied with the troupe's success, George gives them a day off. Harvey and TJ want to visit a flea market, and Kennosuke and TJ's rivalry flares up much (to Nadja's annoyance). When Nadja, Kennosuke, Rita, TJ and Harvey visit the Clignancourt market, a seller tries to cheat George (who turns the tables, with a lesson in caveat venditor). Kennosuke and TJ meet Fernando Gonzales when the haughty aristocrat is bargain-hunting. When Fernando tries to buy an old clock with great sentimental value to a shopkeeper, Gérard, Nadja slaps him for his insensitivity. Grateful to Kennosuke for fixing the clock, Gérard gives Nadja a clue to her mother: a music box she sold him a decade earlier.
11	"A Narrow Escape: Love Confession in Paris"; Transliteration: "Kiki Ippatsu! Pari no kokuhaku" (Japanese: 危機一髪！パリの告白)	Yoshihiro Oka	Akatsuki Yamatoya	13 April 2003
On her day off, Nadja discovered her mother's music box and that she spent time with her as a baby. Oliver has a crush on her; Rosso and Bianco chase them when they are on an errand, and they hide in his workplace. Although TJ is jealous, Oliver and Nadja are also just friends. George takes the Dandelion Troupe eastward.
12	"Treasure Hunting is Romantic?"; Transliteration: "Takarasagashi wa Romanchikku!?" (Japanese: 宝探しはロマンチック！？)	Mamoru Hosoda	Akatsuki Yamatoya	20 April 2003
The Dandelion Troupe's stop in Lorraine demonstrates George's proclivity for treasure hunting. He shows the skeptical Kennosuke and Nadja a treasure map from the British Museum of the village of Domrémy. Answering Kennosuke, George tells the story of French folk heroine Jeanne d'Arc. Their hired guide leads them to a steep cliff before they realize that "treasure" has many meanings.
13	"Francis in the Morning Light"; Transliteration: "Asahi no naka no Furanshisu" (Japanese: 朝陽の中のフランシス)	Takuya Igarashi	Yoshimi Narita	27 April 2003
Nadja finishes her first dance costume with Granny Anna's help as the Happy Carrier Car goes to Switzerland for a charity performance at the Le Man Orphanage, which once accommodated the Dandelion Troupe. During her dance Nadja notices Francis, there to visit the recently built library. He retrieves her hat from a tree she had climbed. After leading the orphans through her Tyrolean dance she climbs the tree again, with Francis following her.
14	"A Lie at the Alpine Flower Festival"; Transliteration: "Arupusu hanamatsuri no uso" (Japanese: アルプス花祭りのウソ)	Yasuo Yamayoshi	Yumi Kageyama	4 May 2003
As Nadja dreamily remembers her infatuation (followed by a first kiss), George brings the troupe to a village preparing to host a festival as the tomboyish Zabine interrupts her sledding to watch them. Nadja publicizes the Dandelion Troupe by echoing the local Tyrolean dance, and befriends Zabine as Rita feels left out. The Alpine Flower Festival is a success; Zabine is attracted to Kennosuke, and dances in dress repaired by Nadja.
15	"Family in a Storm"; Transliteration: "Arashi no naka no Kazoku" (Japanese: 嵐の中の家族)	Takao Iwai	Takashi Yamada	11 May 2003
The beauty of the Alps is tempered by Kennosuke's reservations about the Happy Carrier Car's ability to cope with the weather and the roads. The Saint Gotthard tunnel has caved in, halting Italy-bound trains for three days; while the troupe packs supplies for its depart a noblewoman, Collette Preminger, gives her father Duke a bouquet of roses for his birthday (which Herman's arrival ruins). Duke is trying to catch Nadja when the Happy Carrier Car begins acting up during a storm. After a good meal, everyone joins forces to revive the car and Nadja reaffirms her determination to find her mother.
16	"I Don't Understand the Game of Love Adults Play"; Transliteration: "Wakaranai! Otona no ren'ai gēmu!" (Japanese: わからない！大人の恋愛ゲーム！)	Akinori Yabe	Yumi Kageyama	18 May 2003
After their Alpine adventure, the troupe crosses into Italy with stranded passengers (where it is scheduled to perform at a Lake Como banquet) and Kennosuke wants to spend time with Rita. Nadja mails a letter to Miss Applefield with the help of Julietta Sciavelli, Leonardo Cardinale's fiancée. At the masquerade ball, Nadja meets Antonio Fabiani; when Julietta declines a boat ride, Leonardo arrives with a group of other women and Nadja and Julietta get acquainted. As Julietta tells Nadja she is marrying Leonardo for political reasons, Kennosuke reminds Nadja about their performance. At the party, Antonio makes a play for Julietta before Nadja performs her dance routine (a flag dance with Kennosuke). When the troupe leaves for Milan the next morning, Nadja's mother (Collette Preminger) appears.
17	"Love and Ambition in Milan"; Transliteration: "Ai to yabō no Mirano" (Japanese: 愛と野望のミラノ)	Yasuo Yamayoshi	Takashi Yamada	25 May 2003
After hearing from Rosso and Bianco that Milan is Nadja's next destination, Herman reaffirms his goal of inheiriting the Preminger duchy. On the troupe's final day, Nadja and Kennosuke's dance is a hit with the audience. George's decision to spend the next day sightseeing has Nadja looking for Victorio Capuletti, while Herman uses Rosso and Bianco to capture her. Kennosuke has begun calling Nadja "my little rosebud", which annoys her. Leonardo invites Nadja to visit his office at the end of the work day; while Herman, Rosso and Bianco pursue her, Leonardo learns that Antonio has information about Victorio when he tells Antonio about Nadja. Herman and Nadja meet without recognizing each other, and she discovers that not only does Victorio not know about her mother, he has been economically crushed by Antonio.
18	"Venice, The Tearful Mama Mia"; Transliteration: "Venetsia, namida no Manma Mīa" (Japanese: ヴェネツィア、涙のマンマ・ミーア)	Yoshihiro Oka	Tomoko Konparu	1 June 2003
Although she hides her disappointment at not being reunited with her mother, Nadja is angry at Antonio's behavior toward Victorio. The troupe remains in Venice to make money, and Nadja and Kennosuke's dance makes TJ jealous. The three take a gondola ride, during which the gondolier (Irma) reveals that she is Antonio's mother and is shocked at her son's treachery. Harvey explains to Nadja why she ended up in the Applefield Orphanage.
19	"A Foggy Night: The Black Rose's Truth"; Transliteration: "Kiri no Yoru: Kuro Bara no Shinjitsu" (Japanese: 霧の夜・黒バラの真実)	Tatsuya Nagamine	Yoshimi Narita	8 June 2003
As the Dandelion Troupe prepares to leave Venice, Nadja daydreams about watching a sunset with Francis until Kennosuke startles her with a Black Rose mask. Abel tells them that Venice may be eventually submerged, and the Black Rose may not be all bad; Nadja disagrees, which frightens Rita. Nadja helps a sick gondolier with a delivery, and discovers the medicine he needs is too expensive.
20	"Dangerous Date in Rome"; Transliteration: "Kiken ga ippai! Rōma no Dēto" (Japanese: 危険がいっぱい！ローマのデート)	Yukihiko Nakao	Yumi Kageyama	22 June 2003
Christian is attracted to Nadja when he sees her dance with Kennosuke (who is jealous), and Nadja is happy when Christian is chosen for a university research team bound for Egypt. George suggests that Nadja and Christian tour the Roman ruins. A pickpocket steals Nadja's brooch and a boy, Lucca, wants to give the brooch to his grandmother so she will spend time with him outside.
21	"The Mother and Daughter Who Keep Passing Each Other and Two Birthdays"; Transliteration: "Surechigau Oyako: Futatsu no Tanjōbi" (Japanese: すれ違う母娘・ふたつの誕生日)	Takao Iwai	Tomoko Konparu	29 June 2003
After a performance, the troupe tries to guess Granny Anna's age and how to celebrate her upcoming birthday. Nadja is unaware that her Grandfather, her mother and her mother's new husband (Count Albert Waltmüller) are nearby. Collette is bound for a hotel to talk her nephew, Oscar Colorado, into attending a debutante ball. She met her first husband, Raymond (who was killed in a train accident), at a ball. After Raymond's death, Duke Preminger ordered Collette to return to Vienna and Nadja to be placed in the orphanage. Collette senses that Nadja is searching for her, despite Bianco and Rosso's pursuit of Nadja in Milan, and Duke Preminger expects Nadja to earn her inheritance.
22	"Help! Memories of Fire"; Transliteration: "Tasukete! Honō no Kioku" (Japanese: 助けて！炎の記憶)	Akinori Yabe	Takashi Yamada	6 July 2003
Rita leads Crème and Chocolat through a routine when a drunken customer shouts "Fire!" Nadja delegates Rita to deal with the fire, but Kennosuke notices Rita's nervousness before she flees with Nadja's brooch. Granny Anna and George remember the circus troupe which disbanded after Rita's parents died in a fire. When Kennosuke hurries to her rescue and Nadja and Chocolat are in danger, Rita regains her ability to speak.
23	"Terror! Ghost Ship of the Mediterranean"; Transliteration: "Kyōfu! Chichūkai no yūreibune" (Japanese: 恐怖！地中海の幽霊船)	Yasuo Yamayoshi	Akatsuki Yamatoya	13 July 2003
The Mediterranean and the approach to Barcelona encourage Rita to enjoy the marine life, but Nadja is unhappy at having to make a flamenco costume. Kennosuke teases George about not being able to hunt for treasure at sea, until one of the crewmen tells a story about the Castanets, a gang of pirates. When the pirates board the ship Sylvie, Thomas, George and the rest of the troupe repulse the attack.
24	"Olé! Solar Matador and Flamenco"; Transliteration: "Ōre! Taiyō no Tōgyū-shi to Furamenko" (Japanese: オーレ！太陽の闘牛士とフラメンコ)	Takuya Igarashi	Yoshimi Narita	20 July 2003
Nadja is impressed with matador José Rodriguez' bullfighting skills. José is headed to an arena, and Granny Anna tells Nadja to teach Anselma flamenco dancing. Anselma is a good pupil, and José tells Nadja he is too busy for her.
25	"The Return of the Beautiful Betrayer"; Transliteration: "Kaettekita uragiri no Bijo" (Japanese: 帰ってきた裏切りの美女)	Yoshihiro Oka	Yoshimi Narita	27 July 2003
Granny Anna's intercession for Anselma has landed Nadja in the story of a fallen flamenco dancer, Carmen, who loves José and visits Anselma. Carmen befriends Nadja, prompting her to reunite Carmen and José. As the arena guards are ejecting Nadja (thinking she is an overzealous fan), she sees José drunk after trashing his room and tells him that Carmen still loves him. José and Carmen reconcile, become engaged and see Nadja's flamenco dance.
26	"The Other Side of Francis"; Transliteration: "Furanshisu no mukō-gawa" (Japanese: フランシスの向こう側)	Mamoru Hosoda	Akatsuki Yamatoya	3 August 2003
As the troupe arrives in Granada, Nadja and Abel are the only ones awake. While reading a newspaper article about the Black Rose coming to Granada, Nadja is robbed of her brooch by two pickpockets. A young nobleman retrieves the brooch, telling her that the equestrian who defended her at the Applefield Orphanage was not Francis but his twin brother Keith Harcourt. She is confused when she sees Francis with a woman who seems to be his girlfriend and Keith put on the Black Rose's mask.
27	"High-Flying Kennosuke"; Transliteration: "Soratobu Kennosuke!" (Japanese: 空飛ぶケンノスケ！)	Tatsuya Nagamine	Takashi Yamada	10 August 2003
Nadja tries to cope with her love for the Harcourt brothers, she ruins the troupe's lunchtime soup. After Rita and Kennosuke's complaints, George relieves her of kitchen duty. George and Granny Anna try to resolve Nadja and Kennosuke's feud by sending them on an errand to Monte Frio, past a sunflower field. While Nadja dances, Kennosuke tells her how inventor Chuuhachi Ninomiya took him under his wing after his sister Hanako was sent to live with relatives and he was sent to be a carpenter's apprentice before he met the troupe. When she hears about his dream of building a spaceship, Nadja realizes that they are very much alike. George visits Mrs. Ramirez, who Granny Anna wants to embroider some hats. Nadja makes a kimono for Kennosuke, who reciprocates by giving her a typewriter he repaired.
28	"The Dangerous Princess"; Transliteration: "Kiken'na Purinsesu" (Japanese: 危険なプリンセス)	Takao Iwai	Yumi Kageyama	17 August 2003
Rosemary races onto the stage after a flamenco performance, and she has become a thorn in Nadja's side. Nadja looks for her in the labyrinthine Gonzalez mansion.
29	"A Wonderful Life! The Man Who Saw Light and Shadow"; Transliteration: "Subarashiki jinsei! Hikari to kage o mita otoko" (Japanese: すばらしき人生！光と影を見た男)	Akinori Yabe	Yoshimi Narita	24 August 2003
Unable to find Rosemary, Nadja writes to Headmistress Applefield for help when José drops by with a bouquet; after Nadja finishes and mails her letter, José explains that he was the protégé of a matador, Manolo, when Carmen arrived. Nadja suggests that Carmen needs more flamenco lessons, and José complains that Carmen is high-maintenance and has lost much of her stamina; he ends their engagement, deciding to travel.
30	"The Muddy White Rose"; Transliteration: "Doromamire no Shiro Bara" (Japanese: 泥まみれの白バラ)	Yasuo Yamayoshi	Akatsuki Yamatoya	31 August 2003
Nadja customizes an umbrella for a new dance on their way to Mikonos; on the island, she sees a young man she thinks is Francis (especially when he meets a woman Nadja recognizes from Granada). Francis explains that Mary-Anne Hamilton is his childhood friend and Keith his twin brother. George grounds Nadja because she is unfocused and Francis inadvertently buys a condemned building from the Pegasus Orphanage.
31	"The Clown Who Won't Cry"; Transliteration: "Nakanai Piero" (Japanese: 泣かないピエロ)	Yukihiko Nakao; Osamu Kasai	Takashi Yamada	7 September 2003
Nadja upsets a tea break with an unfortunate inquiry about a nutcracker doll Abel is carving. While Nadja is dancing, a boy in a wheelchair and his mother (Mary) move close to the stage and Abel loses his concentration. When Nadja points out Abel's inexperience, George explains to the troupe that he met Abel in Germany four years earlier. Granny Anna adds that Abel was a doctor in a destitute village during an epidemic, when there was not enough money for medicine. When his son Stefan fell ill, Abel turned to crime and was imprisoned. Not knowing why Abel did not go to Stefan after his release from prison, Nadja decides to ask Stefan (the wheelchair-using boy at the performance with his mother).
32	"The End of the Nile: The Secret of the Ring"; Transliteration: "Nairu no hate: Yubiwa no Himitsu" (Japanese: ナイルの果て・指輪の秘密)	Yoshihiro Oka	Yumi Kageyama	14 September 2003
Nadja's joy at discovering that Egypt (with which her mother is connected) is the troupe's next stop gives way to Rosemary throwing her lot in with Rosso and Bianco. In Egypt, Abel tells Nadja that Collette met archeologist Edward Harrison at a dance and she decides to look for him. She discovers that the late Professor Harrison was Christian's mentor and told him about the ring in Nadja's brooch and how the Premingers got it when Collette married into the family. Vienna is chosen as the troupe's next destination, and after Kennosuke is rescued from an underground crypt they perform for his rescuers.
33	"The Brooch That Vanished Into the Pyramid"; Transliteration: "Piramiddo ni kieta burōchi" (Japanese: ピラミッドに消えたブローチ)	Tatsuya Nagamine	Yoshimi Narita	21 September 2003
Nadja learns about her relationship to the Premingers, and is kidnapped by Rosso and Bianco, but they cannot escape with Nadja's brooch and she joins forces with them to navigate the pyramid. The goons then leave her tied up in the desert and ride off with her brooch.
34	"Farewell, Dandelion Troupe"; Transliteration: "Sayonara, Danderaion ichiza" (Japanese: さよならダンデライオン一座)	Takao Iwai	Yoshimi Narita	28 September 2003
Nadja is distracted after learning her mother is alive, which affects her dancing and attracts criticism from Thomas. Nadja and Kennosuke's search for the other troupe members finds Granny Anna focused on making money and George trying to get rich quick. When Thomas is still angry with Nadja because she has stopped rehearsing since her brooch was stolen, Abel criticizes Thomas. As Kennosuke marvels at how Thomas and Abel can simultaneously rehearse and argue, Sylvie requests help with the grocery shopping. Overhearing George say that the troupe is defunct (along with criticism of her), Nadja decides to leave for Vienna on her own before the troupe realizes that her pursuit by Rosso and Bianco is good publicity. When Crème and Chocolat corner her, she realizes that the troupe is not disbanding after all.
35	"The Wind's Trick: Irony of Fate"; Transliteration: "Kaze no itazura: Unmei no Hiniku" (Japanese: 風のいたずら・運命の皮肉)	Akinori Yabe	Yumi Kageyama	5 October 2003
Nadja's mother, Collette Preminger, watches her flamenco dance and there is only one show left before the troupe leaves for Vienna. Collette, hiding from Johanna, is searching for her daughter and their thought processes are remarkably similar. Collette tells Nadja she wants to find a vendor whom she and Raymond had seen in Rome; although she only has until dusk, they eat roasted chestnuts and Collette climbs a tree for the first time, but Johanna and Oscar arrive before Nadja can tell Collette her name.
36	"Danger Lurks: The Black Rose's Life on the Line"; Transliteration: "Ayaushi! Inochi o kaketa Kuro Bara" (Japanese: 危うし！命を賭けた黒バラ)	Yasuo Yamayoshi	Takashi Yamada	12 October 2003
Traveling from Rome to Vienna via Salzburg, the Happy Carrier Car breaks down and will require a week to repair. Interference by a police officer of Kennosuke and Nadja's advertising for the troupe is overshadowed by the Black Rose's arrival. The troupe has been invited to a charity concert, hosted by the mayor, in three days. On a nighttime walk, Nadia sees the Black Rose trying to evade the police; Keith apologizes for his past behavior, explaining that an aristocratic social custom cost his mother her life and sorry to learn that Nadja had her brooch stolen. Nadja will not stay away from the Premingers; Keith invades Herman's mansion, decommissioning Rosso and Bianco but being attacked by Herman.
37	"Light and Darkness: The Plan to Get the Brooch Back"; Transliteration: "Meian! Burōchi dakkan sakusen" (Japanese: 明暗！ブローチ奪還作戦)	Naoyuki Itō; Yukihiko Nakao	Akatsuki Yamatoya	19 October 2003
Exhausted and injured, Keith knows he must retrieve Nadja's brooch and warn her about Herman's plans; although it is easy to reclaim the brooch, Nadja is impatient to leave Salzburg. She finds a map of Austria, and reads some library books with help from the German-speaking Abel. Harvey decides to write a newspaper article to help find her brooch. He zealously begins the article, while the Happy Carrier Car is repaired and Keith returns Nadja's brooch.
38	"Rosemary: The Scheme Behind the Smile"; Transliteration: "Rōzumarī: Egao no Inbō" (Japanese: ローズマリー笑顔の陰謀)	Takuya Igarashi; Takao Iwai	Yumi Kageyama	26 October 2003
Nadja's hopes to meet her mother in Vienna is mirrored by Duke Preminger's displeasure at a family matter's exposure against his wishes. Nadja's recently regained brooch is part of Rosemary's pauper-to-princess ambition, and the troupe realizes that it is better off without Rosemary. At a party that night at Viscount Strohein's mansion, Herman realizes that Nadja Preminger is a danger to him and Rosemary throws Collette's dress, trunk and hat out a window.
39	"Don't Steal My Mother!"; Transliteration: "Toranaide! Watashi no okāsan" (Japanese: 盗らないで！私のお母さん)	Tatsuya Nagamine	Tomoko Konparu	9 November 2003
Kennosuke finds Nadja devastated over the destruction of Collette's ball gown by Rosemary. While the troupe decides what to do about the latter, Harvey points out that Nadja is thought to have stolen the brooch. Collette is angry with Duke Preminger for his attempts to usurp her daughter, unaware of Rosemary's involvement. Nadja visits the Premingers with her brooch, but Herman and Rosemary have already convinced Duke Preminger that Nadja is a thief.
40	"Morning of Decision, Journey of Truth"; Transliteration: "Ketsui no Asa! Hontō no Tabidachi" (Japanese: 決意の朝！本当の旅立ち)	Takao Iwai	Akatsuki Yamatoya	16 November 2003
The troupe, exhausted, arrives in Paris and Thomas reminds them that any publicity would reveal Nadja's whereabouts. When Nadja tries to obtain Oliver's testimony against Rosemary, she discovers that he is on the road. George offers himself to the police, despite Nadja's objections (which are thwarted by Kennosuke). Rita, Créme and Chocolat distract the two officers long enough for Abel, Sylvie and Thomas to incapacitate them and hide the Happy Carrier Car in a barn. Guilty about George's arrest and aware that she is in danger, Nadja bids farewell to the troupe and leaves for Applefield Orphanage.
41	"A Journey Alone, with Joys and Hardships"; Transliteration: "Yorokobi mo Kurushimi mo hitori tabi" (Japanese: 喜びも苦しみもひとり旅)	Yoshihiro Oka	Takashi Yamada	23 November 2003
Nadja is awakened from a dream where Collette recognizes Nadja as her daughter in front of the troupe (with Francis and Keith giving Nadja flowers) by a cow licking her. She learns that from Cherbourg (a half-day train ride away), a ship will arrive in England the next day. On the train, Nadja mistakenly sits in first class and a thief tries to steal her luggage. She loses her train ticket and music box (containing Austrian gold coins), but receives a free trip to England as compensation.
42	"Alone at Home"; Transliteration: "Hitori botchi no furusato" (Japanese: ひとりぼっちの故郷)	Akinori Yabe	Yoshimi Narita	30 November 2003
While Collette treats Rosemary to homemade pastries, Nadja finally arrives at the orphanage to find it deserted after Headmistress Applefield's death. She must begin gathering witnesses on her behalf again; after spending the night with Raphel in Headmistress Applefield's former office, Nadja decides to return to London.
43	"Piano Lullaby"; Transliteration: "Piano ga tsunagu komoriuta" (Japanese: ピアノがつなぐ子守歌)	Yukihiko Nakao	Takashi Yamada	7 December 2003
In London Nadja visits the National Museum in the hope of finding Christian, but learns that Edna Grey is house-sitting for him. Discouraged, Nadja sees an advertisement for a John Whittard piano recital. After the concert, Nadja tells John what has happened; he gives her sheet music for her favorite lullaby (signed by her father, Raymond Colville) and brings her to Raymond's former music teacher (who gives her information about, and a photograph of, her father).
44	"Which Do I Like? The Ultimate Decision!"; Transliteration: "Dotchi ga suki? Kyūkyoku no sentaku!" (Japanese: どっちが好き？究極の選択！)	Takuya Igarashi	Tomoko Konparu	14 December 2003
After learning that her father was a gentle family man who composed her favorite lullaby, Nadja and John attend a party where she sees Francis. Keith arrives to take Nadja to the Waltmüller (where Collette lives with her husband Albert), and the twins vie for the girl's attention. Mary-Anne's possessiveness towards Francis is reminiscent of Carmen's for José. Julietta tells Nadja about how Antonio Fabiani'a ardor cooled as her fiancé, Leonardo, began appreciating her and leaves her more confused than ever.
45	"Three-Person Triangle: The Wavering Romance"; Transliteration: "Sannin Mōyō Guratsugu Koigokoro" (Japanese: 三人模様・ぐらつく恋心)	Yasuo Yamayoshi	Yoshimi Narita	21 December 2003
Mary-Anne announces her engagement to Francis (to his great surprise), and he says that Nadja (not Rosemary) is a Preminger. Three party-goers corner Nadja and demand her expulsion, as Francis criticizes the three women's (and Earl Harcourt's) hypocrisy. In the meantime, Rosemary prepares to defend her claim.
46	"Confrontation Between the Two Nadjas"; Transliteration: "Futari no nāja, taiketsu!" (Japanese: 二人のナージャ、対決！)	Naoyuki Itō	Yumi Kageyama	28 December 2003
Francis and Nadja arrive in Vienna to meet her mother, but Rosemary (with Duke's help) is prepared to forestall a scandal and is prepared for Nadja's attempts to prove her identity: the brooch, the diary, the ball gown, the lullaby and the circumstances surrounding the orphanage's destruction. The Duke is implacable; Herman remembers what Keith looks like, and suggests Francis' arrest. With Nadja and Francis unjustly imprisoned, Herman finds Rosemary unsympathetic to his greed after Duke declares her his heiress.
47	"Silence! The Captured White Rose"; Transliteration: "Chinmoku! Toraware no shiro bara" (Japanese: 沈黙！囚われの白バラ)	Takao Iwai	Tomoko Konparu	4 January 2004
Francis' and Nadja's arrests (for being the Black Rose and as a result of Rosemary's lies, respectively) is a shock to Harvey and Collette. Mary-Anne accepts the fact that Francis is attracted to Nadja and not her. Francis plans to introduce Nadja to the media without endangering Keith. Collette and Albert go to the police station to visit Nadja; the girl's determination to exonerate Francis reveals to Collette that the Premingers are not what they seem. As Harvey and Nadja brainstorm how to dash Herman's plans, Keith and Francis reconcile after hearing Nadja's lullaby.
48	"Reversal: The End of the Black Rose"; Transliteration: "Gyakuten! Kuro bara no saigo" (Japanese: 逆転！黒バラの最後)	Yoshihiro Oka	Yoshimi Narita	11 January 2004
Ironically, Nadja is now searching for Rosso and Bianco to convince the two goons to betray Herman. Harvey sees Keith beckoning to him, leaving Nadja unattended long enough for her to approach the Colorado mansion (where she sees Bianco, and decides to investigate). Oscar and Collette attempt to persuade Herman to leave with his creditor, Antonio Fabiani, but Herman balks to save face. Meanwhile, the Black Rose leaves Vienna.
49	"Don't Give Up: The Power of Truth"; Transliteration: "Akiramenai! Shinjitsu no chikara" (Japanese: 諦めない！真実の力)	Akinori Yabe	Tomoko Konparu	18 January 2004
Nadja is asleep in a dungeon with Rosso and Bianco. When Bianco tells Nadja that the Black Rose had been there, she remembers that Francis is still in prison and resolves to destroy Herman's plans. Herman wanders into the dungeon as Rosso gives Nadja valuable information. With Rosso and Bianco's help, Nadja climbs the wall and escapes through a skylight. As she is attacked by gunfire, the Dandelion Troupe come to her rescue. Herman is jailed with Rosso and Bianco, and Francis is cleared of criminal charges for Keith's visit to the Colorado mansion. Rosemary, surprisingly, admits defeat and Nadja discovers that Duke Preminger has but one thing on his mind.
50	"New Door of Destiny"; Transliteration: "Aratanaru Unmei no Tobira" (Japanese: 新たなる運命の扉)	Takuya Igarashi	Tomoko Konparu	25 January 2004
Rosemary tells Nadja about Duke Preminger's obsession with what he considers the duchy's best interests, and Nadia resumes searching for her mother. Collette rushes to the Premingers for her daughter; after a joyous reunion, Collette brings Nadja home and they at last spend some time as mother and daughter. Keith and Francis visit Nadja to try persuading her to return to the Premingers; she berates the Duke for his misdeeds, telling him that she wants to see the world as a dancer for the Dandelion Troupe (which has arrived for her).

=== Manga ===
A manga adaptation by Ayumi Yui was serialized in Nakayoshi beginning with the March 2003 issue.

=== Novel ===
A sequel novel, set three years after the anime, titled Ashita no Nadja - 16-sai no Tabidachi (小説 明日のナージャ 16歳の旅立ち, lit. 'Tomorrow's Nadja - A Journey at 16 Years Old'), was released on September 12, 2017. Tomoko Konparu, the anime writer, wrote the novel and Kazuto Nakazawa, the anime character designer, returned to draw the novel's cover art and other illustrations.

== See also ==
- Noblesse oblige, the motto of Francis Harcourt.
