= The Independent Collegian =

University of Toledo student newspaper

The Collegian
- Type: Monthly student newspaper
- Format: Broadsheet
- School: University of Toledo
- Founded: 1919 (as The Universi-Teaser)
- Relaunched: 24 February 2023
- Headquarters: 2975 W Centennial Dr. Mail Stop 530; Toledo, Ohio 43606
- Website: www.utoledocollegian.com

The University of Toledo Collegian is a student newspaper published in Toledo, Ohio, serving the University of Toledo community.

== Early history ==
The Independent Collegian was first published in 1919 as The Universi-Teaser. It was renamed The Campus Collegian three years later. In 1962, it was renamed The Collegian. Copies of the papers are digitally archived at the University of Toledo library site.

== Competition and color ==
In early 1993, two former Collegian editors started a rival publication, Spectrum, which was published in full color. At the time, The Collegian was a published in black-and-white, with occasional spot color runs for special occasions such as Valentine's Day. In response, The Collegian switched to full-color publication on September 20, 1993, although the news that The Collegian was planning to do so was first published in August by Spectrum, rather than by The Collegian itself.

== Independence ==
In 2000, after a long history as a student organization sponsored by the University of Toledo's Dean of Students Office, the editorial staff sought independence. This allowed the paper to keep and use its ad-sales revenue. The newspaper began operation as a 501(c)(3) nonprofit corporation, the Collegian Media Foundation. The offices moved from the Student Union to off-campus headquarters, and the paper was renamed The Independent Collegian.

In the fall of 2012, the newspaper moved back on campus to a suite in Carlson Library.

== Return to University Affiliation ==
On October 29, 2019, the editorial staff announced a return to university sponsorship, a move to an all digital platform, and a name change: UToledo Collegian.
