= Spectra =

Spectra may refer to:

- The plural of spectrum, conditions or values that vary over a continuum, especially the colours of visible light
- Spectra (journal), of the Museum Computer Network (MCN)
- The plural of spectrum (topology), an object representing a generalized cohomology theory in algebraic topology
- Spectra (mathematical association), an association of LGBT mathematicians
- Spectra (Latreille 1802), an order of stick-insects, or Phasmatodea

== Companies and products ==
- Kia Spectra, a car developed by Kia Motors from 2000 to the present.
- Motorola Spectra and Astro Spectra, models of two-way radio.
- Optare Spectra, a bus body built by Optare.
- Polaroid Spectra, a type of instant camera and instant film formerly produced by the Polaroid Corporation.
- RCA Spectra 70, the name for a series of mainframe computers made by RCA, and which were sold to Univac to become the Univac 90/60 series computer.
- Spectra, a brand of ultra-high-molecular-weight polyethylene fiber.
- Spectra Energy, an American company that was spun out of Duke Energy.
- SPECTRA helmet, a ballistic helmet made of Dyneema.
- Thales Spectra, an integrated defensive aids suite developed by Thales Group for the Dassault Rafale series of fighter aircraft.
- Spectra Group, a Bangladesh conglomerate.
- Spectra Experiences, a venue management company.

== Entertainment ==
- Bantam Spectra, the science fiction/fantasy imprint of Bantam Books
- Sally Spectra, a fictional character on The Bold and the Beautiful
- Spectra (poetry collection), a 1916 American literary hoax
- Spectra Books, publishing imprint
- Spectra, a subsidiary of Comcast Spectacor, an American sports and entertainment company
- Spectra Phantom, a character from the TV series Bakugan Battle Brawlers: New Vestroia
- Spectra, the name of the enemy planet in the 1970s anime television series Battle of the Planets
- Spectra (installation), an artistic installation for the First World War centenary in London
- Spectra Vondergeist, a Monster High character
- Spectra, a video game published by Mastertronic Group and scored by Chipzel
- Spectra, a light and water show by the Marina Bay Sands

== See also ==
- Specta Films, Jacques Tati's film production company founded in
- Spector (disambiguation) (includes Spektor)
- Spectre (disambiguation) (includes Specter)
- Spectrum (disambiguation)
- Specctra (auto-router)
