= Spectrum (newspaper) =

Former Toledo, Ohio newspaper

- The 1994-02-02 front page of Spectrum
- Type: Weekly newspaper
- Format: Tabloid
- Publisher: Will Nicholes
- Editor: Michael Miller
- Founded: March 31, 1993

Spectrum was a Toledo, Ohio-based newspaper (and later, magazine) serving the University of Toledo community.

== History ==
Spectrum was founded in 1993 by two University of Toledo students, Michael Miller and Will Nicholes. Both had previously served as editors at the student newspaper, The Collegian.

Spectrum contributors included future Toledo Free Press cartoonist Jeff Payden (creator of GoComics comic Biff & Riley) and Edward Shimborske III. Shimborske served as Spectrum's music editor from April 1993 until January 1994, when he left to start his own publication, The Glass Eye.

The first issue of Spectrum was published March 31, 1993, with the tagline "Weekly guide to arts and leisure." The first issue featured a preview of the UT production of Stephen Sondheim's Assassins, interviews with student leaders, and restaurant and music reviews. In October of that year, the paper was first to publish a report that the UT student government was investigating The Collegian for inflating its circulation numbers by discarding large numbers of newly-printed Collegians immediately after printing them. The Collegian responded the next day with an editorial denouncing the investigation as a "smear campaign" and criticizing Spectrum for publishing the report.

In November 1993, the Toledo Blade published an editorial commenting on the reactions of the Spectrum and Collegian editorial teams to the news that Bruce Douglas, the then-chairman of the UT Board of Trustees, had given UT President Frank Horton cash gifts. The Blade noted the "delightful irreverance [sic]" of the papers' columns, contrasting The Collegian's "impertinent" commentary with Miller's "more light-hearted view".

In January 1994, Spectrum underwent a redesign from a newspaper format to a magazine format, featuring full-cover photography. Miller currently serves as Toledo Free Press Editor-in-Chief.
