= David Avraham Spector =

Rabbi David Avraham Spektor
- דוד אברהם ספקטור
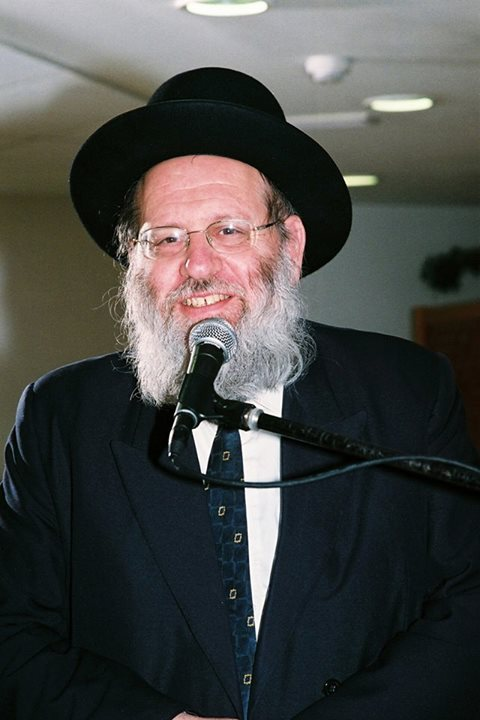

Personal life
- Born: 9 August 1955 Amsterdam, Netherlands
- Died: 16 September 2013 (aged 58)
- Spouse: Chaya Spektor
- Education: Mercaz HaRav, Meretz Kollel
- Occupation: Rabbi

Religious life
- Religion: Judaism
- Denomination: Orthodox

Jewish leader
- Position: Rabbi of Givat Sharett, Beit Shemesh
- Yeshiva: Mercaz HaRav
- Main work: El-David Responsa, Tahorat Eretz Yisrael, Torat Eretz Yisrael

David Avraham Spektor, also spelled Schpektor (9 Av 5715 – 12 Tishrei 5774) (Hebrew: דוד אברהם ספקטור; 9 August 1955 – 16 September 2013) was a Dutch–born Israeli rabbi. He was born in Amsterdam, the Netherlands and emigrated to Israel in 1973, after the Yom Kippur War. Spektor studied at several yeshivas for ten years, primarily at Yeshivat Mercaz HaRav and the Meretz Kollel. He was ordained by the Chief Rabbinate of Israel as both a neighbourhood rabbi (Rav Shechunah) and city rabbi (Rav Ir).

== Career ==
Spektor positions included being an army chaplain with the rank of lieutenant in artillery, a rabbi at Hebrew University of Jerusalem, rabbi of the Nokdim community in Gush Etzion, and a lecturer in Michlelet Emunah college for women in Jerusalem.

In 1998 Spektor was appointed the Ashkenazic rabbi of the Givat Sharett neighborhood of Beit Shemesh. He was also a local rabbinate in Beit Shemesh.

Spektor died on 12 Tishrei 5774 (16 September 2013) after having cancer for two years.

== Publications ==
Spektor's books include:

- El-David Responsa on Halachic questions
- Tahorat Eretz Yisrael on ritual purity in halacha and thought
- Torat Eretz Yisrael on the weekly portion
- Sefer HaGabbai
- Beit Shemesh, the Biblical town
- Herodian Responsa
- Drama, Art and Graphic Design Responsa

His wife, Rabbanit Chaya Spektor has also published a book:

- The Value of Childbirth in Jewish Sources
