= Spektrum =

Spektrum may refer to:

- Oslo Spektrum, a sports, event and concert venue in Oslo, Norway
- Trondheim Spektrum, a sports and event venue in Trondheim, Norway
- Spektrum Flyers, a former ice hockey team based in Oslo
- Spektrum RC line of RC Hobby radio systems from the American company of the same name
- Spektrum (band), a band who had a number one on the UK Dance Chart in 2007
- Spektrum (building), an office tower in Warsaw, Poland
- Spektrum (magazine), a Norwegian literary and cultural magazine, issued from 1946 to 1954
- Spektrum der Wissenschaft (magazine), German science magazine; online version at Spektrum.de
