= Spectrum (TV series) =

- Genre: Drama anthology
- Country of origin: Canada
- Original language: English
- No. of seasons: 1
- No. of episodes: 8

Production
- Producers: Frank Goodship; Philip Keatley
- Production location: Vancouver
- Running time: 30 minutes

Original release
- Network: CBC Television
- Release: 5 June – 31 July 1958

Spectrum is a Canadian drama anthology television series that aired on CBC Television in 1958.

== Premise ==
This Vancouver-produced series featured various teleplays.

== Scheduling ==
This half-hour series was broadcast Thursdays at 10:00 p.m. (Eastern time) from 5 June to 31 July 1958.

== Episodes ==
- 5 June 1958: The Window of Namko (Paul St. Pierre)
- 12 June 1958: The Choice (Ernest Langford)
- 19 June 1958: A Small Revolution (Paul Power)
- 26 June 1958: Oh, Dream of Fair Islands (Ernest Langford)
- 3 July 1958: His Place in Life (David Gray)
- 10 July 1958: (pre-empted by special programme, "Memo to Champlain")
- 17 July 1958: Joe Faceless (Len Peterson)
- 24 July 1958: Some Days, You Have to Hit Somebody (Len Peterson)
- 31 July 1958: Paradise Court (Peter Starner)
