= The Spectre (rapper) =

British rapper

The Spectre is a British rapper, born in the French region of Normandy in 1986. He is best known for his fast paced lyrics and rhythms. Having been born out of a Canadian father and a French mother, the Spectre is bilingual. He lives between London and Paris and raps in both languages. He has won for four weeks in a row the weekly television contest Vous Avez du Talent on the French cable television channel IDF1 where he performed a version of "Back to Black" by Amy Winehouse.

His first album Buy One Get None Free, recorded with the British studio 9side Records, was released for free on the Internet in May 2011.

== Discography ==
Albums

- Buy One Get None Free (2011)

Singles

- "Love Me" (2009)
- "I Love You" (2011)

== Trivia ==
The music video for "I Love You" from his album Buy One Get None Free features French model Camila Aouatefe.
