= Spectrum Films =

Spectrum Films may refer to:

- Spectrum Films (Australia), a post-production company founded by Hans Pomeranz in 1998, still in existence
- Spectrum Films (Canada), a former film production company founded in the early 1980s by Holly Dale and Janis Cole
- Spectrum Films (Mexico), Mexican film production company, produced ¡Qué despadre! (2022)
- Spectrum Films (UK), a former British company created by Claude Friese-Greene in 1924 to market his new colour processing method

== See also ==
- Specta Films, former film production company founded by French filmmaker Jacques Tati
- Spectrum Film, a former Dutch company founded in 1951 by Louis van Gasteren
