= Spector =

Spector or Spektor may refer to:

== People with the surname ==
- Alfred Spector (born 1954), Vice President of Research and Special Initiatives at Google
- Art Spector (1920–1987), American basketball player
- Baylon Spector (born 1998), American football player
- David Spector (disambiguation), multiple people
- Douglas Spector, plaintiff in Spector v. Norwegian Cruise Line Ltd.
- Iftach Spector (born 1940), Israeli brigadier general
- Jonathan Spector (born 1986), American soccer player
- Matias Spektor, Argentine academic
- Maurice Spector, former chairman of the Communist Party of Canada
- Mira J. Spektor (1928–2021), German-born American composer, poet, and music director
- Morgan Spector (born 1980), American actor
- Norman Spector, Canadian journalist, diplomat, civil servant, and newspaper publisher
- Phil Spector (1939–2021), American music producer
- Regina Spektor (born 1980), Russian-born American singer, songwriter, and pianist
- Ronald H. Spector (1943–2026), American military historian and academic
- Ronnie Spector (1943–2022), American singer from the Ronettes
- Tim Spector (born 1958), British epidemiologist and science writer
- Warren Spector, American computer game designer
- Yitzchak Elchanan Spektor, Russian orthodox rabbi

== Other uses ==
Art, entertainment, and media

- Spector (band), an indie-rock band from London
- Spector (company), a company producing bass guitars
- Doctor Spektor, a comic book character
- Marc Spector, the alias of Marvel Comics character Moon Knight
- Paul Peter (aka Peter Baldwin), Sally Ann, Olivia, and Liam Spector; fictitious characters on the BBC crime series The Fall

Computing and technology

- Veriato, formerly known as SpectorSoft, a company that develops spyware

== See also ==
- Spectra (disambiguation)
- Spectre (disambiguation) (also includes Specter)
- Spectrum (disambiguation)
