= Spectrum (Japanese band) =

SPECTRUM
- Genre: Brass rock
- Years active: 1979–1981
- Label: Victor
- Spinoff of: Horn Spectrum

SPECTRUM was a Japanese brass rock band that formed in Spring 1979 and broke apart following their final concert in September 1981. The complete line-up was Ichirō Nitta and Jun'ichi Kanesaki on trumpet, Toshiyuka Yoshida on trombone, Shinji Nishi on guitar, Naoki Watanabe on bass, Atsuo Okamoro on drums, Keiichi Oku on keyboard, and Takuro Konno on percussion.

== History ==
=== Formation ===
Trumpeters Ichirō Nitta and Jun'ichi Kanesaki, with saxophonist Tetsu Nakamura were part of Horn Spectrum, a horn-only group emerging from musicians surrounding Music Mate Players (MMP). Nitta had wanted to form a band was looking for the opportunity while at Amuse. After Southern All Stars debuted and achieved success in 1978, Nitta, Kanesaki, and bassist Naoki Watanabe made a demo tape at the end of 1978. In Spring 1979, five more musicians joined and producing the eight-member lineup for SPECTRUM. The five members were trombone player Toshiyuki Yoshida, then a member of Harada Shinji's band, guitarist Shinji Nishi, then a member of MMP, drummer Atsuo Okamoro, then a member of Ai-do associated with Hamada Shōgo, keyboardist Keiichi Oku, and percussionist Takuro Konno. These eight members then constituted SPECTRUM, and they began recording their first album in Los Angeles, California on 12 May 1979.

=== Debut ===
On 7 June 1979, SPECTRUM had wrapped up recording their debut album utilising LA Warner Studio at 11114 Cumpston Street, North Hollywood. They also used a second studio for overdubbing and mixing, Amigo Studios also located on Cumpston Street. During the recording, Bobby Hata was the principal American recording engineer, with Hideo Takada as another recording engineer while Yuki Sugawara participated as a supporting percussionist. When Takada travelled to the United States as part of the Japanese production team, he encountered recording-equipments configurations from what he was accustomed to in Japan.

On 22 July, SPECTRUM made their first performance at Seibu Stadium in Tokorozawa, Saitama under event name 80's JAM OVER JAPAN. Nippon Broadcasting System served as the broadcaster, which was celebrating its 25th anniversary at the time. On 25 August, the band released the album, SPECTRUM under label Victor and distributed by Victor Music Industries, Inc. At the time, the band combined a three-piece horn front line, 16-beat arrangements, falsetto vocals, and elaborate choreography. Victor described them as an exceptionally distinctive act, while industry opinion described them as being "three years too early" and that Japanese audiences supposedly only liked 8-beat music.

=== Optical Sunrise (1979–1980) ===
On 12 September 1979, SPECTRUM began recording their second album at Victor Studio, Aoyama, and Hitokuchizaka Studio, Ichigaya in Tokyo. This time, recording engineer Takada was entirely responsible for the recording the album. It was also the first album where Konno was the band's regular percussionist, formally joining before the recording of it. On 28 October, the band held a debut concert tour titled SPECTRUM SHOCK beginning at Osaka Koseinenkin Hall. They then toured at Aichi Kinrō Kaikan on 1 November, and lastly at Nippon Seinenkan in Tokyo on the 13th that month. On 18 January 1980, the band wrapped up recording their album. It was released on 5 March 1980 under Victor, under title OPTICAL SUNRISE, also known as SPECTRUM 2. The album had a track list of seven songs, which as follows: Side A: MOTION, F.L.Y, 侍S (SAMURAI S), IN THE SPACE, and Side B: ミーチャン GOING TO THE HOIKUEN, SONG, and SUNRISE. SUNRISE would become famous as the entrance theme associated with American professional wrestler Stan Hansen. It was also adopted as a high-school baseball cheering song. Another song, IN THE SPACE was used in a Matsushita Electric Industrial commercial for the Technics SPACE-7 component stereo.

=== Time Break (1980) ===
Takada served as the recording engineer in the recording of SPECTRUM's third album. It was released on 21 November 1980 under Victor, and was more ambitious than the first two. Its first half was largely instrumental and forms a large-scale suite. The album had a track list of six songs, which is listed as follows: TIME BREAK, ACT-1, ACT-2, ACT-3, 夜明け(アルバ) (Yoake / Alba), and あがき (Agaki). Yoake was also released as a single and was used as the advertising song for Seiko Watch's ALBA watch brand originally launched in 1979.

== Dissolution ==
When members began to diverge in their views, especially with the differences of opinions between Nitta and the other members. At the time, band's management sought a major commercial hit, and Nitta tried to adapt its direction without abandoning its identify. However, other members increasingly objected and the internal disagreement became unmanageable. By the time TIME BREAK was released, they had considered dissolution which was settled on by mid-1981. Instead of immediately breaking apart, they planned to stage a final concert in September. The band ceased recording further albums following the 5 July concert at Shinjuku Kōsei Nenkin Kaikan. In August, Amuse had deliberately gave the members a break to plan their individual careers, ahead of the final concert. On 17 September, their final Osaka concert was held at Osaka Festival Hall, titled 「哀しきブラスバンドクラブ」スペクトラム・ラスト・コンサート ("The Sad Brass Band Club" — Spectrum's Last Concert).

=== Final Concert ===
On 22 September 1981, SPECTRUM held the final concert at Nippon Budokan in Tokyo, featuring the complete lineup. The concert had a ticket price of ¥3,000 and began at 18:30. Keisuke Kuwata appeared as a guest as opening MC, introducing each band member whilst the band's opening song, Samba in F played. Following the concert, the SPECTRUM broke apart after two years of activity. The concert was recorded live and was released as the final album on 15 November, under the title SPECTRUM 6 (SPECTRUM FINAL).

== Discography ==
=== Studio albums ===
List of studio albums
Title	Album details
SPECTRUM	Released: 25 August 1979; Format: LP; Label: Victor Musical Industries (SJX-20150)
SPECTRUM 2 OPTICAL SUNRISE	Released: 5 March 1980; Format: LP; Label: Victor Musical Industries (SJX-20185)
SPECTRUM 3 TIME BREAK	Released: 21 November 1980; Format: LP; Label: Victor Musical Industries (SJX-30031)
SPECTRUM 4 SECOND NAVIGATION	Released: 21 June 1981; Format: LP; Label: Victor Musical Industries (SJX-30077)
SPECTRUM 5 SPECTRUM BRASSBAND CLUB	Released: 5 September 1981; Format: LP; Label: Victor Musical Industries

=== Live albums ===
List of live albums
Title	Album details
SPECTRUM 6 SPECTRUM FINAL	Released: 15 November 1981; Format: 2×LP; Label: Victor Musical Industries; Recorded: 22 September 1981; Venue: Nippon Budokan, Tokyo, Japan

=== Singles ===
List of singles
Title	Single details
トマト・イッパツ / ロリータ	Released: 25 August 1979; Format: 7-inch single; Label: Victor Musical Industries
イン・ザ・スペース / アクトショー (Live Version)	Released: 1 November 1979; Format:7-inch single; Label: Victor Musical Industries (SV-6658)
F・L・Y / ミーチャン Going to the Hoikuen	Released: 5 March 1980; Format: 7-inch single; Label: Victor Musical Industries
SUNRISE / SONG	Released: 5 June 1980; Format: 7-inch single; Label: Victor Musical Industries (SV-7008)
夜明け（アルバ） / やすらぎ (Love for You)	Released: 21 November 1980; Format: 7-inch single; Label: Victor Musical Industries
Night Night Knight / Paradise	Released: 21 June 1981; Format: 7-inch single; Label: Victor Musical Industries (SV-7128)
