= Spectral analysis =

Spectral analysis or spectrum analysis is analysis in terms of a spectrum or polyspectrum of frequencies or related quantities such as energies, eigenvalues, etc. In specific areas it may refer to:

- Spectroscopy in chemistry and physics, a method of analyzing the properties of matter from their electromagnetic interactions
- Spectral density estimation, in statistics and signal processing, an algorithm that estimates the strength of different frequency components (the power spectrum) of a time-domain signal. This may also be called frequency domain analysis
- Spectrum analyzer, a hardware device that measures the magnitude of an input signal versus frequency within the full frequency range of the instrument
- Spectral theory, in mathematics, a theory that extends eigenvalues and eigenvectors to linear operators on Hilbert space, and more generally to the elements of a Banach algebra
- In nuclear and particle physics, gamma spectroscopy, and high-energy astronomy, the analysis of the output of a pulse height analyzer for characteristic features such as spectral line, edges, and various physical processes producing continuum shapes

== See also ==
- Multispectral analysis
- Harmonic analysis
