= Southcote =

Southcote may refer to:

== Places in England ==
- Southcote, Bedfordshire, hamlet of Linslade
- Southcote, Berkshire, suburb of Reading
  - Southcote Junction
  - Southcote Lock
- Southcote or Southcoterow: a disused mediaeval name for an area of farmland and houses near Heathrow

== Family ==
- Southcote family, a prominent family from Devon and Cornwall in England.
- Southcote baronets, an extinct title in the Baronetage of England

== People ==
- George Southcote (disambiguation)
- Joanna Southcott (or Southcote, 1750-1814), self-described prophetess from Devon
- Philip Southcote (1698–1758), English landscape-gardener
- Thomas Southcote (died 1600), English politician
- Thomas Southcote (1622–1664), English landowner and politician
- John Southcote (died 1585) (1510/11–1585), English judge and politician

== Other ==
- Southcote (band), a Canadian band

== See also ==
- Southcott (disambiguation)
