= Anthony Rous (died 1620) =

English politician (c. 1555–1620)

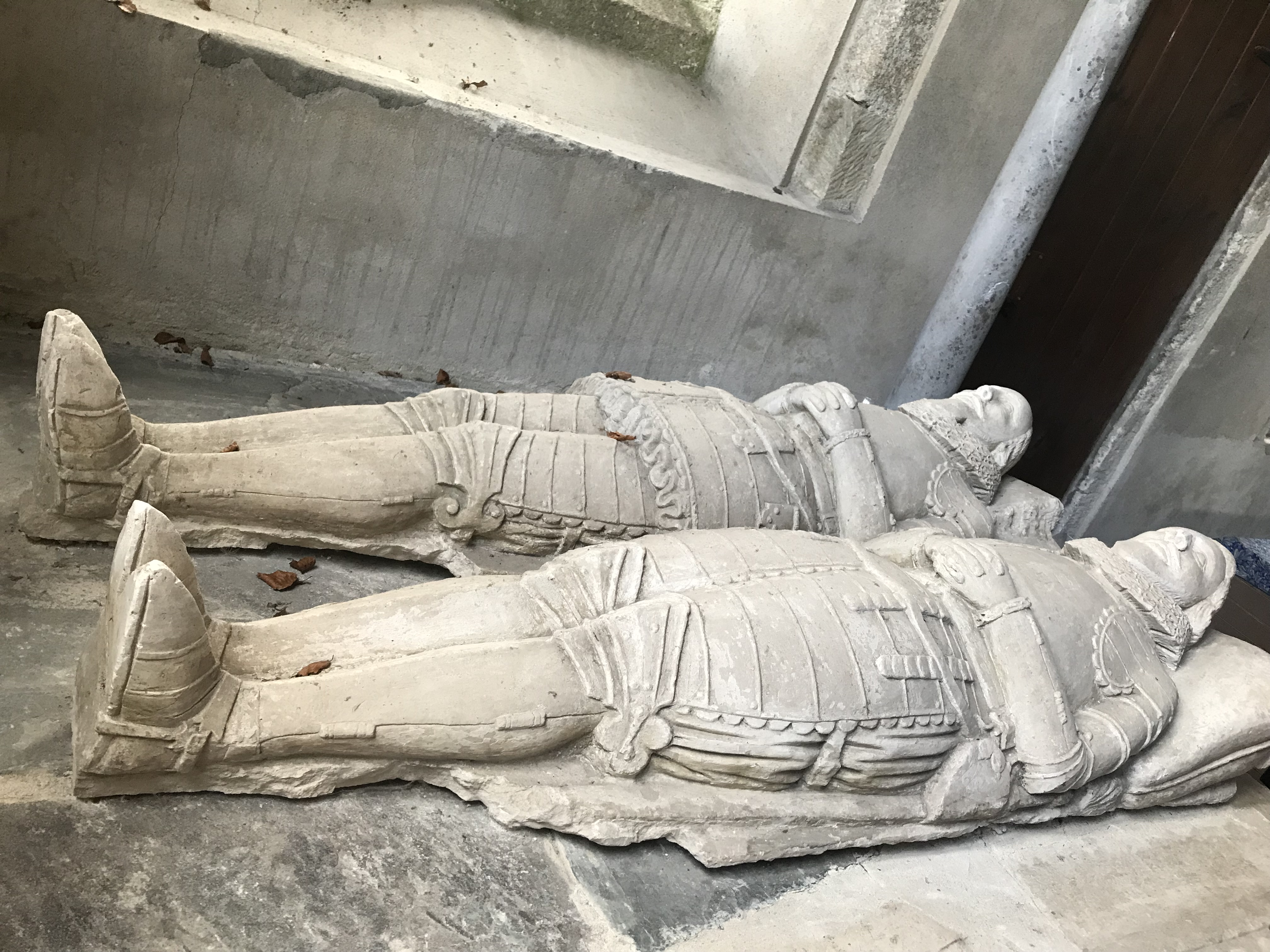
Tomb of Sir Anthony Rous (c.1555–1620), of Halton and on the right his first son Ambrose Rous (d.1620)

Sir Anthony Rous (c.1555–1620), of Halton, near St Dominic in Cornwall, was an English landowner and a Member of Parliament between 1584 and 1604.

He was born the eldest son of Richard Rous of Rogate, Sussex, and grew up in a strongly Puritan atmosphere. He succeeded his Uncle John soon after 1577 and was knighted in 1603. He possessed almost 10,000 acres of land and was one of Cornwall's richest residents. He was a close friend and executor of Sir Francis Drake.

He was elected MP for East Looe in Cornwall in 1584 and for Cornwall in 1604. He was selected High Sheriff of Cornwall for 1587–88 and 1602–03.

He first married Elizabeth Southcote, daughter of Thomas Southcote, of Bovey Tracey and Mohuns Ottery (1528-1600). This marriage produced four sons, firstly Ambrose Rous (d.1620) and lastly Francis Rous (c.1581-1659). He later married the widow Phillippa Pym (nee Colles) and adopted as his stepson the future Parliamentarian leader John Pym, whose father had died when he was seven months old.

== Coat of arms ==
Coat of arms of Sir Anthony Rous
Helm of a Knight Escutcheon Dexter: Or, a eagle azure (Rous). Impaling Argent, a chevron gules with three coots sable (Southcote)
