= Southcott =

Southcott may refer to:

== Places ==
=== Canada ===
- Southcott Pines, Ontario, a town in Canada

=== England ===
- Southcote, Bedfordshire, a hamlet near Linslade, also known as Southcott
- Southcott, Cornwall, a hamlet near Jacobstow
- Southcott, North Devon, a hamlet near Bideford
- Southcott, Frithelstock, a hamlet near Langtree, in Torridge, Devon
- Southcott, Winkleigh, a hamlet near Winkleigh, in Torridge, Devon
- Southcott, West Devon, a hamlet near Okehampton
  - Southcott Cross, a Dartmoor cross
- Southcott, Wiltshire, a hamlet near Pewsey

== People ==
- Southcott (surname)

== Other uses ==
- Southcott family, a prominent family from Devon and Cornwall, England
- Southcottism, a religious movement formed by Joanna Southcott in England in the early 19th century

== See also ==
- Southcote (disambiguation)
