= George Southcote =

George Southcote may refer to:

- George Southcote (died 1589), MP for Tavistock
- George Southcote (1572–1638), MP for Plympton Erle
- Sir George Southcote, 1st Baronet (died 1663) of the Southcote baronets
- Sir George Southcote, 2nd Baronet (1664–1680) of the Southcote baronets

== See also ==
- Southcote (disambiguation)
