= Mohuns Ottery =

Historic manor in Devon, England

Coordinates: 50.8440°N 3.1528°W

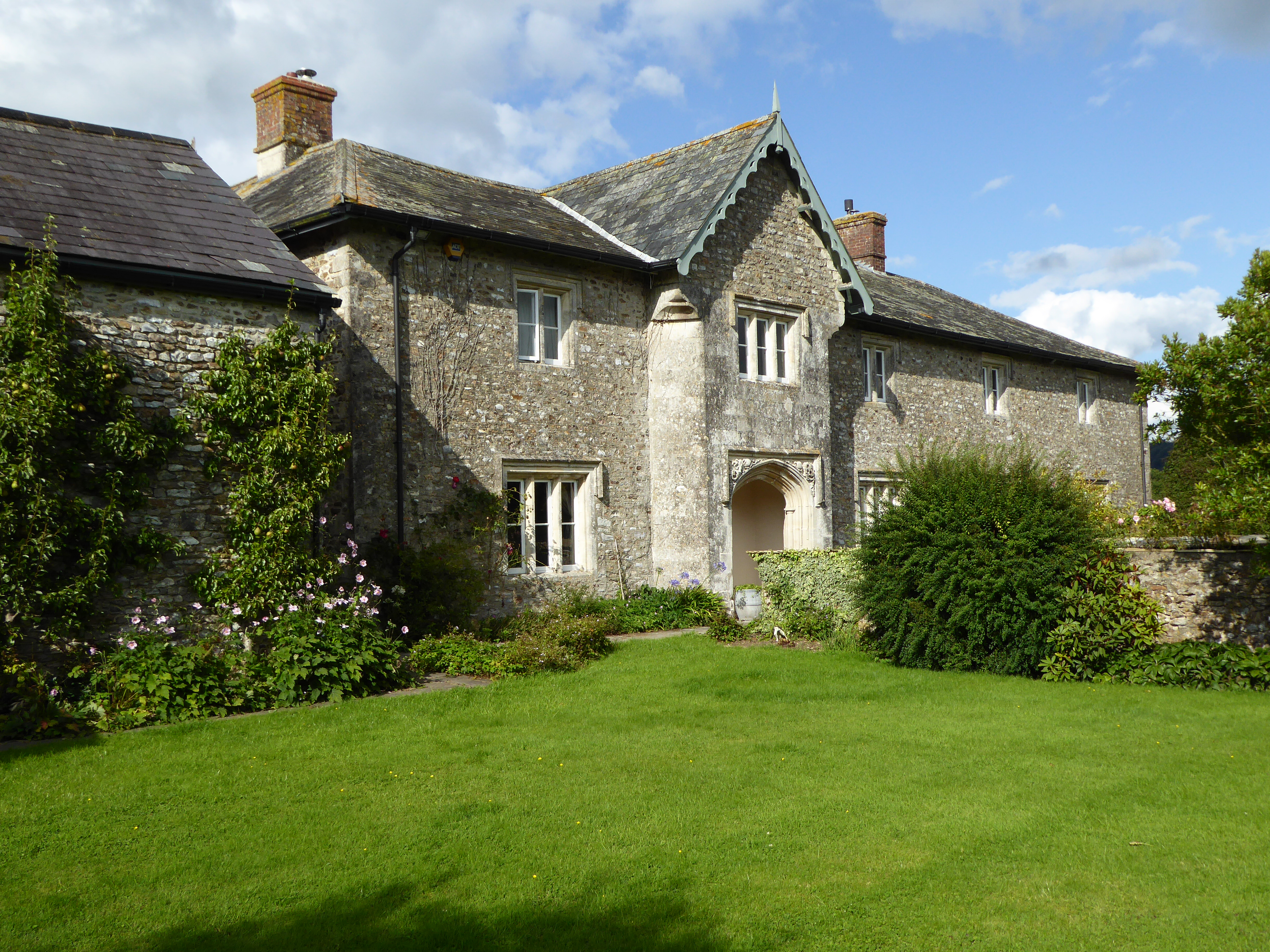
Mohun's Ottery, as rebuilt in 1868

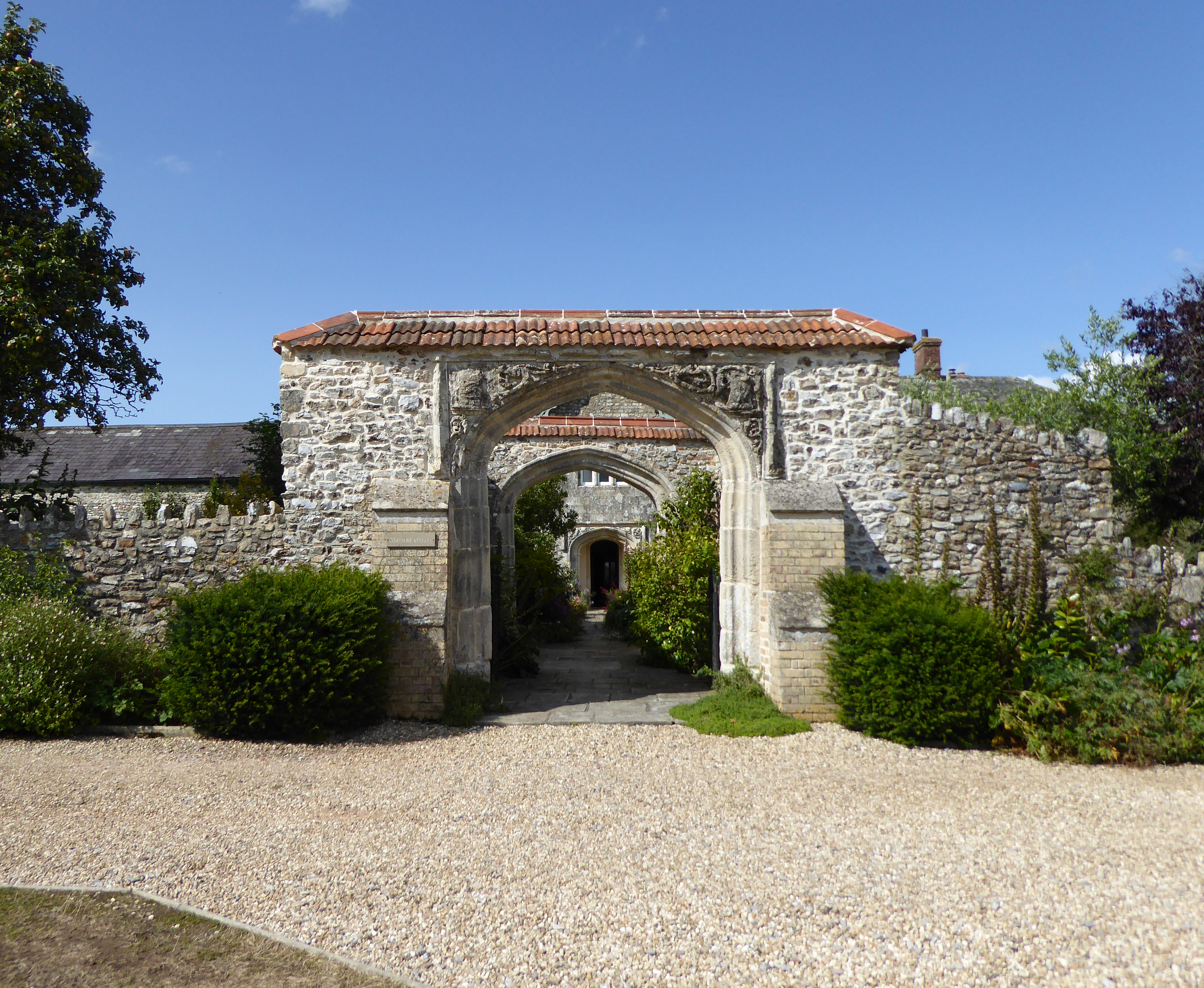
16th c. gatehouse, Mohun's Ottery, with arms of Carew and Mohun in spandrels with Renaissance decorative elements

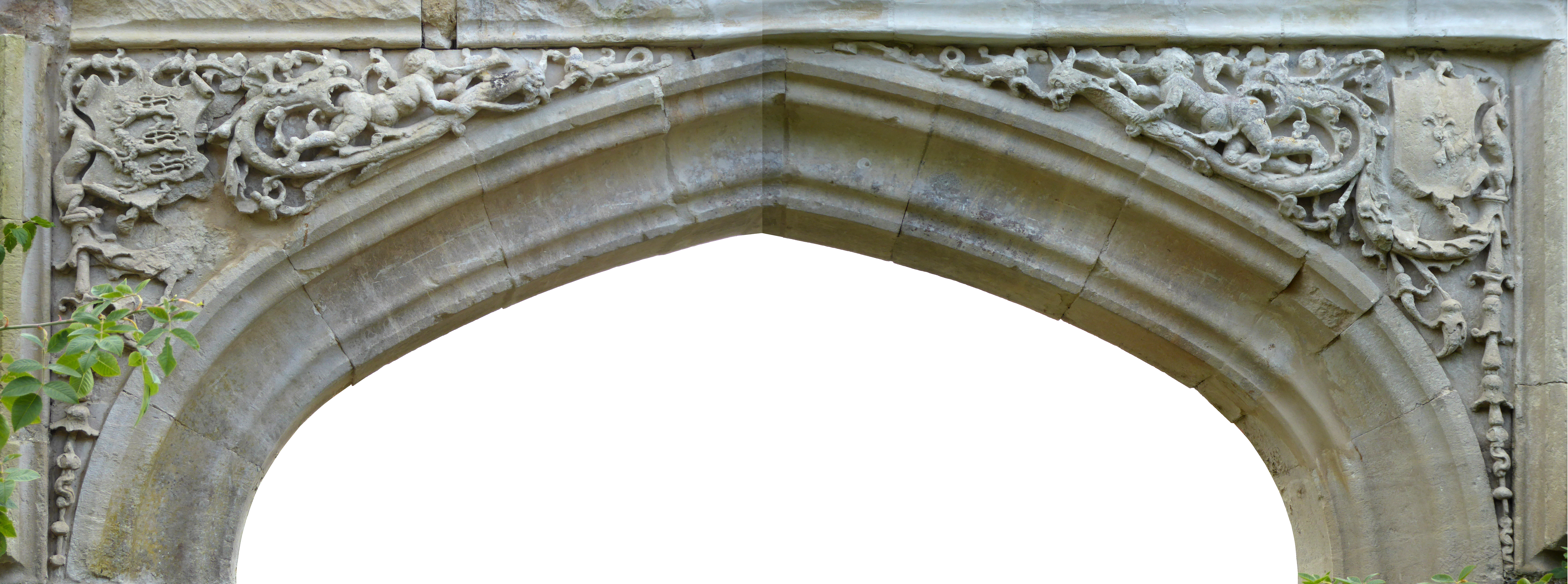
Spandrels of doorway, inner gatehouse, Mohun's Ottery, with arms of Carew and Mohun with Renaissance decorative elements

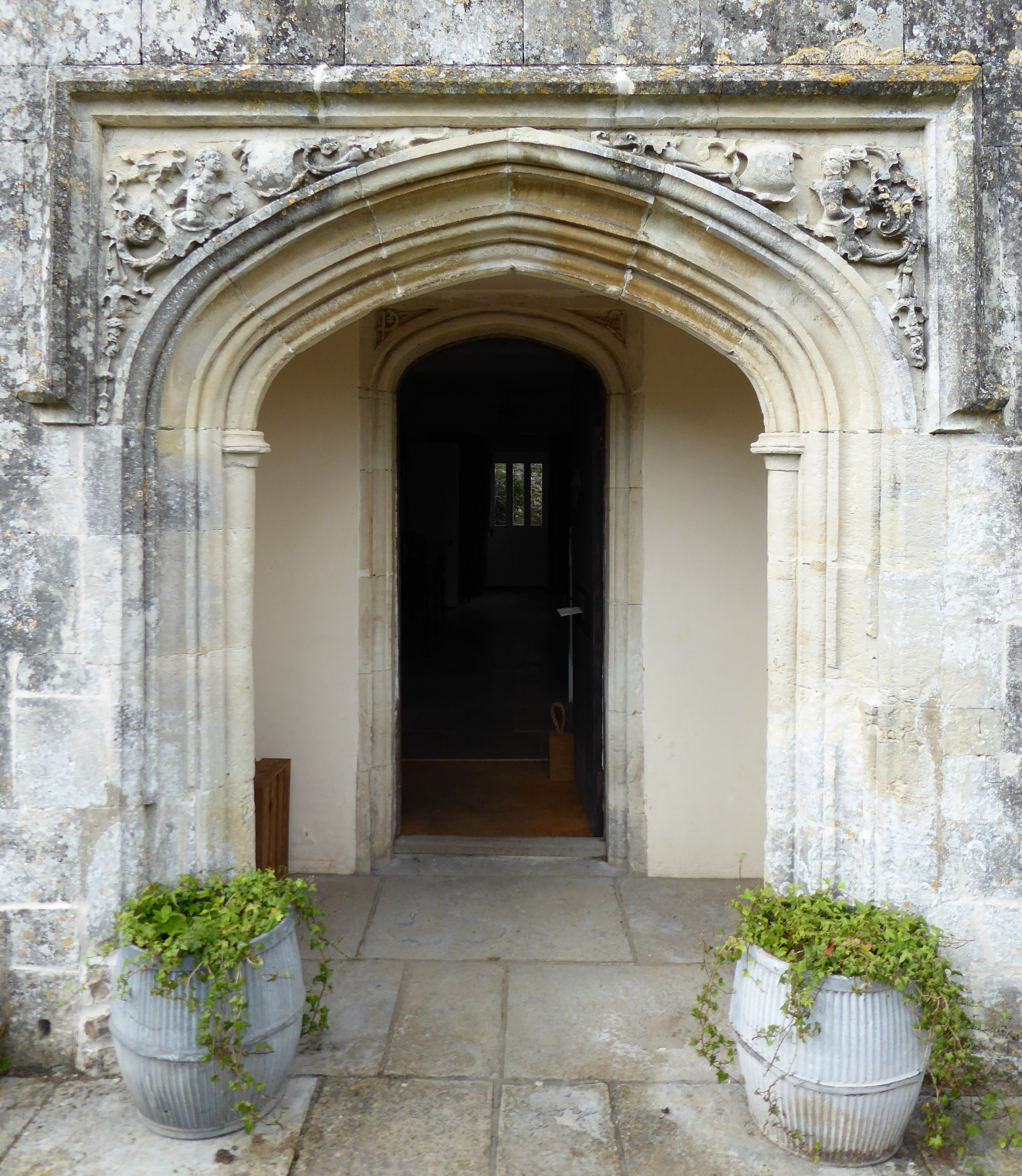
Front entrance, Mohun's Ottery, with re-used Tudor doorway from former mansion

Mohuns Ottery or Mohun's Ottery (/ˌmuːnzˈɒtəri/ "moon's awtrey"), is a house and historic manor in the parish of Luppitt, 1 mile south-east of the village of Luppitt and 4 miles north-east of Honiton in east Devon, England. From the 14th to the 16th centuries it was a seat of the Carew family. Several manorial court rolls survive at the Somerset Heritage Centre, Taunton, Somerset.

The old manor house burnt down in 1868 and was completely rebuilt as a farmhouse, categorised as a grade II listed building since 1955. The ruins of a mid-16th century gatehouse lie to the south of the house; these and the adjoining garden walls, probably built in the mid-19th century at the same time as the farmhouse, are grade II* listed. The house now has six reception rooms and six bedrooms. Around the courtyard are a cottage, stables and farm buildings. The River Otter forms part of the eastern boundary of the estate. In January 2014 the house with 228 acres was offered for sale for £3.5 million.

== Toponymy ==
The word Ottery derives from the River Otter, Old English "oter" ("otter") + "īe" (dative singular of "ēa"). The first appearance of the place-name is in the Domesday Book (1086) where it is recorded as Otri – one of the twelve places in Devon that had that or a very similar name. It appeared in the Book of Fees in 1242 as Otery. In 1247 it was recorded as Otery Flandrensis (Latin "of Flanders") and as Ottery Flemeng in 1279, after the family of William le Flemmeng who held part of the manor between 1219 and 1244.

The name later reflected the residency of the Mohun family, appearing in the Feudal Aids in 1285 as Otermoun, and as Oteri Mohoun in an Inquisition post mortem of 1297. In 1453 it was recorded in the Patent Rolls as Mounesotery, and as Moonsotery in the Recovery Rolls in 1630. Tristram Risdon, writing in the early 17th century, referred to it as Mohun's Ottery, while his close contemporary Thomas Westcote, called it Mohuns-Ottery.

== Descent ==
=== Alsi ===
The Domesday Book of 1086 records that before the Norman Conquest the manor of Otri was held by an Anglo-Saxon thegn known as Alsi. (Note: Thorn, Caroline & Frank state that the Domesday form "Alsi" could represent the Old English name Ælfsige, or Æthelsige or possibly Ealdsige or Ealhsige.) He held several other properties near to Otri, as well as another in Devon, at Dunsford, and probably two more near Dunsford at Lowley and Doddiscombsleigh. He had a large manor at Castle Cary in Somerset and other holdings around this, and single holdings in Dorset and Wiltshire.

=== de Douai ===
In 1086 as recorded in the Domesday Book, the manor of OTRI was the 18th of the 27 Devonshire holdings of Walter of Douai, one of the Devonshire tenants-in-chief of King William the Conqueror. His tenant was a certain Ludo, who held a further five manors from him, namely Little Rackenford, Hetfelle, Luppitt, Greenway (now represented by the synonymous large and ancient farmhouse in the parish of Luppitt) and Stoch (later Stoke Fleming). The last four manors held by Ludo, but not Little Rackenford, descended to the de Mandeville feudal barony of Marshwood and later to the de Mohun family, at least one via the Flemings.

=== de Mandeville ===
It passed at some time, by means unknown, from Walter of Douai to the de Mandeville family, feudal barons of Marshwood in Dorset. A tenant of Geoffrey de Mandeville's manor of Ottery was Reginald de Mohun, as recorded in the Feudal Aid records.

=== Fleming ===
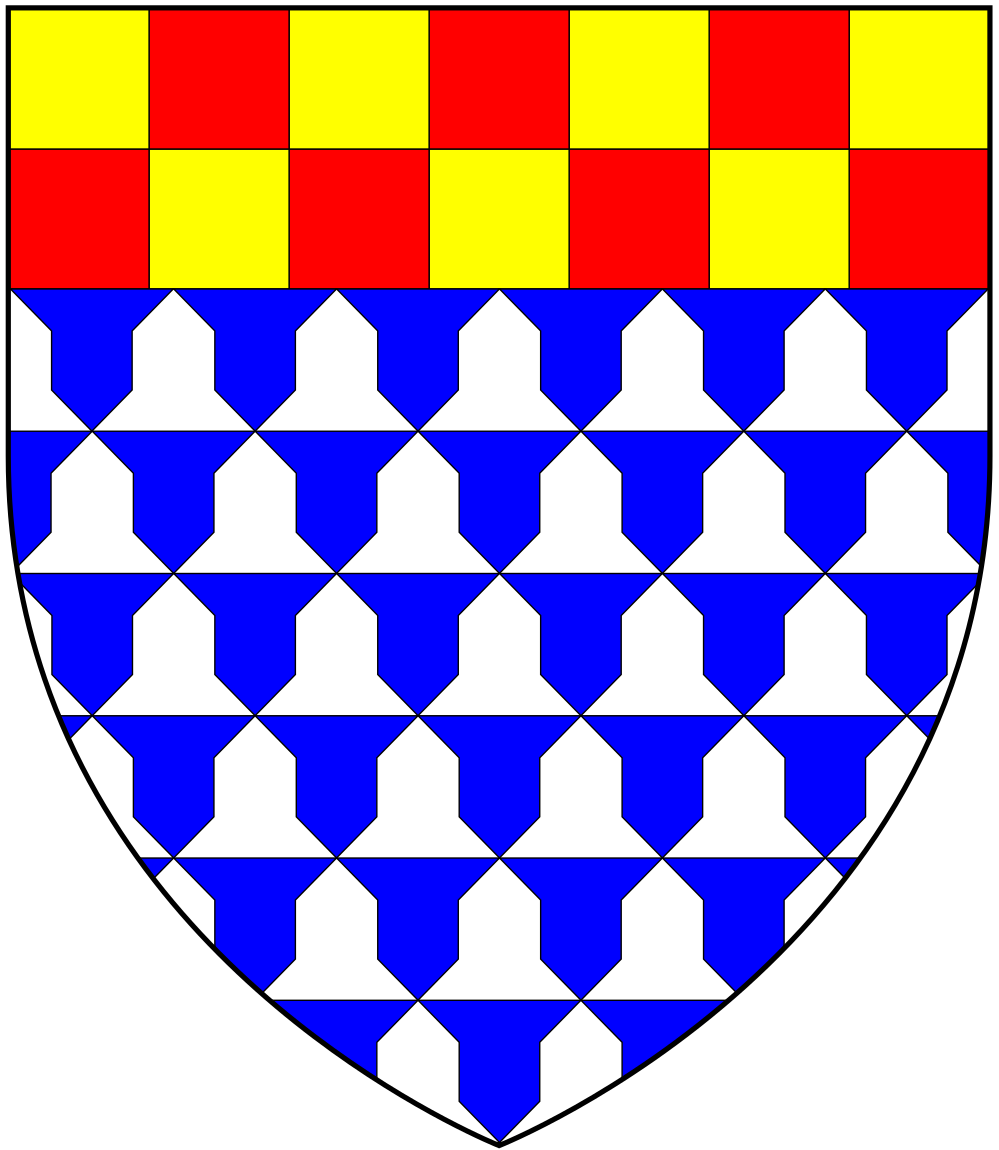
Arms of Fleming of Bratton Fleming, North Devon (and possibly of Stoke Fleming and Mohuns Ottery): Vair, a chief chequy or and gules (Note: Fleming of Bratton Fleming, North Devon. As shown on the Powell Roll of Arms (c.1350), Bodleian Library, Oxford. Also per Lysons, Magna Britannia, 1822, vol.6, Devon, Families removed since 1620) These arms appear quartered by Mohun on the mural monument in Exeter Cathedral to Sir Peter Carew (d.1575) of Mohuns Ottery

The Fleming family at some time held Ottery, which became known as Ottery Fleming. They were also lord of the manor of adjoining Luppitt, which manors thenceforth descended under common ownership for several centuries. It is not known what relationship if any this family bore to the Fleming family, named after its likely origins in Flanders, of Bratton Fleming and other manors in North Devon. The descent was as follows:

- Richard Fleming
- William I Fleming
- William II Fleming

=== Mohun ===
Canting arms of Mohun of Ottery (ancient): Gules, a maunch ermine the hand argent (here shown proper) holding a fleur-de-lis or

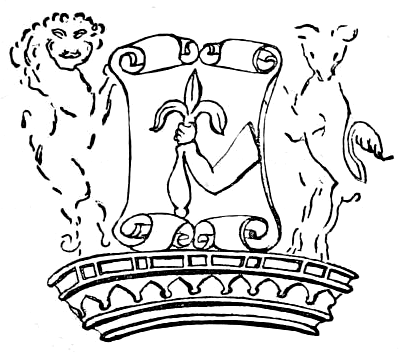
Arms of Mohun (ancient) with supporters, sculpted on right spandrel of archway of old gatehouse, Mohuns Ottery, as visible in 1888: Gules, a maunch ermine the hand argent holding a fleur-de-lis or

Arms of Mohun (modern): Or, a cross engrailed sable

The de Mohun family succeeded the Flemings as tenants of Ottery, but seemingly still as mesne tenants. The mural monument in Exeter Cathedral of Sir Peter Carew (d.1575) of Mohuns Ottery shows the maunch arms of Mohun quartering Fleming (Vair, a chief chequy or and gules, (Note: These are in fact the arms of Fleming, of Bratton Fleming in North Devon, per Pole, p.484, who gives a blank entry for the arms of Fleming of Stoke Fleming in South Devon, which families were possibly identical or related) which if in accordance with the rules of heraldry indicates that the Mohuns married a Fleming heiress. Reginald de Mohun held Ottery under Geoffrey de Mandeville as overlord, as recorded in the Feudal Aid records. The family later superseded the overlord and held this manor as a tenant-in-chief of the king, when the manor became known as Ottery Mohun, with the standard word order for manors with proprietorial suffixes, and later as Mohun's Ottery.

Sir William Mohun of Mohuns Ottery left a daughter and heiress Elinor Mohun married (as his first wife) John Carew (d.1324), eldest son and heir of Nicholas Carew (died 1311), feudal lord of Carew Castle in Pembrokeshire and lord of the manor of Moulsford in Berkshire. Elinor had a son and heir Nicholas Carew (d.1323) who married Elinor Talbot, daughter of Richard Lord Talbot, but died without progeny. Nicholas Carew (d.1323) bequeathed his estates including Mohuns Ottery to his younger half-brother John Carew (d.1363), the son of John Carew (d.1324) by his second wife Joan Talbot, daughter of Sir Gilbert Talbot.

The arms of Mohun (ancient) survive at Mohuns Ottery: "There, on a shield in the spandrel, is carved, amid elegant scroll work and foliage, the old coat-armour of the family — an arm vested in an ermine maunch, the hand grasping a golden fleur-de-lys; a bearing, which, for some reason unknown, John de Mohun, Baron of Dunster, who died in 1330, abandoned for the afterward well-known coat, adopted also by the Abbeys of Newenham and Bruton — a cross engrailed sable, on a field or".

=== Carew ===
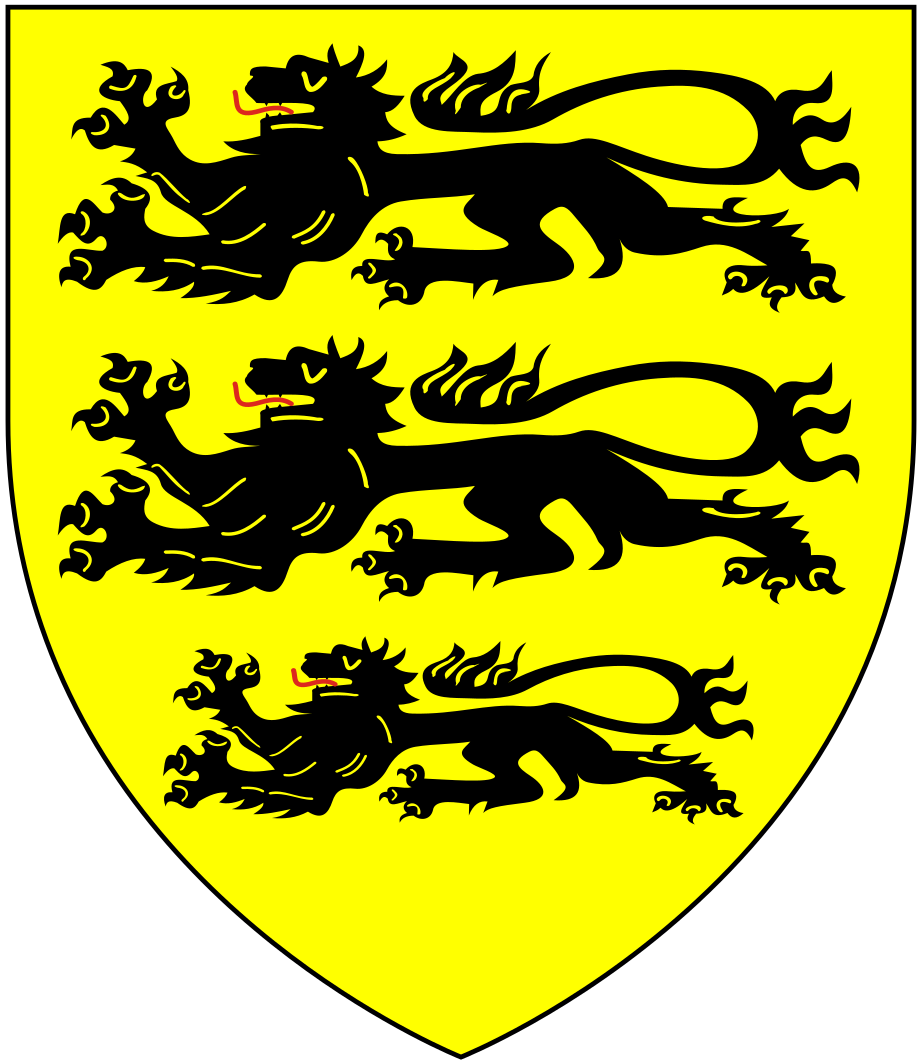
Arms of Carew: Or, three lions passant in pale sable

The Carew family succeeded to the Mohun family as holders of Ottery, but never changed the proprietorial suffix. The descent of Mohuns Ottery from Sir William Mohun (younger son from his second marriage of Reginald II de Mohun of Dunster) was as follows:

==== John I Carew (d.1324) ====
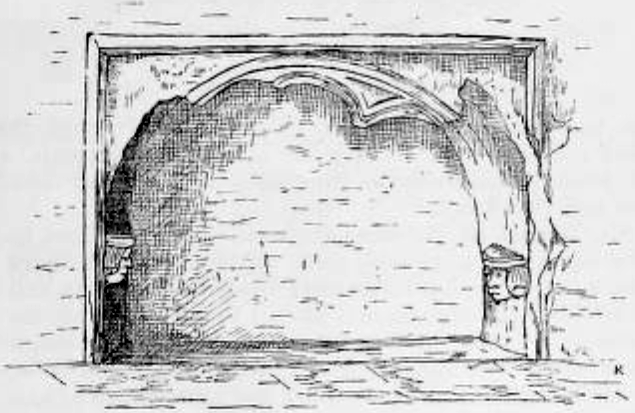
Empty arched recess in Luppitt Church which may originally have housed an effigy of John Carew (d.1324)

John I Carew (d.1324), who married firstly Elinor Mohun, heiress of Mohuns Ottery. He was the eldest son and heir of Nicholas I Carew (died 1311), feudal lord of Carew Castle in Pembrokeshire and lord of the manor of Moulsford in Berkshire. He survived his first wife and remarried to Joan Talbot, daughter of Sir Gilbert Talbot, by whom he had issue. It is believed that the now empty arched recess in Luppit Church may originally have housed his effigy.

==== Nicholas II Carew (d.1323) ====
Nicholas II Carew (d.1323), son (by his father's first wife Elinor Mohun) and heir apparent, who married Elinor Talbot, daughter of Richard Lord Talbot, but died without progeny. He bequeathed his estates including Mohuns Ottery to his younger half-brother John Carew (d.1363), the son of John Carew (d.1324) by his second wife Joan Talbot, daughter of Sir Gilbert Talbot.

==== John II Carew (d.1363) ====
John II Carew (d.1363), younger half-brother, the son of John Carew (d.1324) by his second wife Joan Talbot, daughter of Sir Gilbert Talbot. He was a great soldier and fought at the Battle of Crécy in 1346. He married twice:

  - Firstly to Margaret de Mohun, daughter of John IV de Mohun (d.post 1322), eldest son and heir apparent of John III de Mohun, 1st Baron Mohun (1269–1330), feudal baron of Dunster, whom he predeceased, having married Christiana Segrave (d.1341), daughter of William Segrave, and having fought at the Battle of Boroughbridge in 1322 and died some time after in Scotland. Margaret's eldest brother was Sir John V de Mohun, 2nd Baron Mohun, KG, (c.1320–1375), the last in the senior male line of Mohun of Dunster.
  - Secondly he married Elizabeth "Corbit" (Corbet).

==== Sir Leonard Carew (1343–1369) ====
Sir Leonard Carew (1343–1369), son and heir by his father's first wife Margaret de Mohun. He married Alice FitzAlan, daughter of Sir Edmund FitzAlan de Arundel (c.1327-1376/82) by his wife Sybil de Montacute, a younger daughter of William Montacute, 1st Earl of Salisbury. Sir Edmund FitzAlan was the bastardised eldest son of Richard FitzAlan, 10th Earl of Arundel (c.1306/13-1376) by his first wife Isabel le Despenser (1312-c.1376-7). As the Earl obtained an annulment of his first marriage on the basis of both parties having been under-age, Sir Edmund FitzAlan was bastardised and thus prevented from inheriting the earldom.

==== Thomas Carew (1361–1430) ====
Thomas Carew (1361–1430), son and heir, "a valiant knight" who served under King Henry V at the Battle of Agincourt in 1415. He married Elizabeth Bonville, daughter of Sir William Bonville (d.1408) of Shute, Devon, by his wife Margaret Damerell.

==== Nicholas III Carew (d.1447) ====
Nicholas III Carew (d.3 May 1447), eldest son and heir, who married Joane Courtenay (1411-post 1450), a daughter of Sir Hugh Courtenay (1358–1425) of Haccombe in Devon and of Boconnoc in Cornwall, MP and Sheriff of Devon, a grandson of Hugh Courtenay, 2nd/10th Earl of Devon (1303–1377) and grandfather of Edward Courtenay, 1st Earl of Devon (d.1509). Joane Courtenay's mother (her father's second wife) was Phillipa Archdekne, daughter and heiress of Sir Warren Archdekne of Haccombe in Devon. Joane Courtenay was the eventual sole-heiress of her mother, and was the heiress of 16 manors, which she divided amongst her younger Carew sons. She survived her husband and re-married, by royal licence dated 5 October 1450, to Sir Robert Vere (d.1461), younger brother of John de Vere, 13th Earl of Oxford (1442–1513). He had by his wife Joane Courtenay three daughters and five sons, as follows:

- Thomas Carew (bc 1425 - d.1471) of Mohuns Ottery, eldest son and heir. "Disobliging his mother (having undutifully given her a blow)", he was excluded from his maternal inheritance.

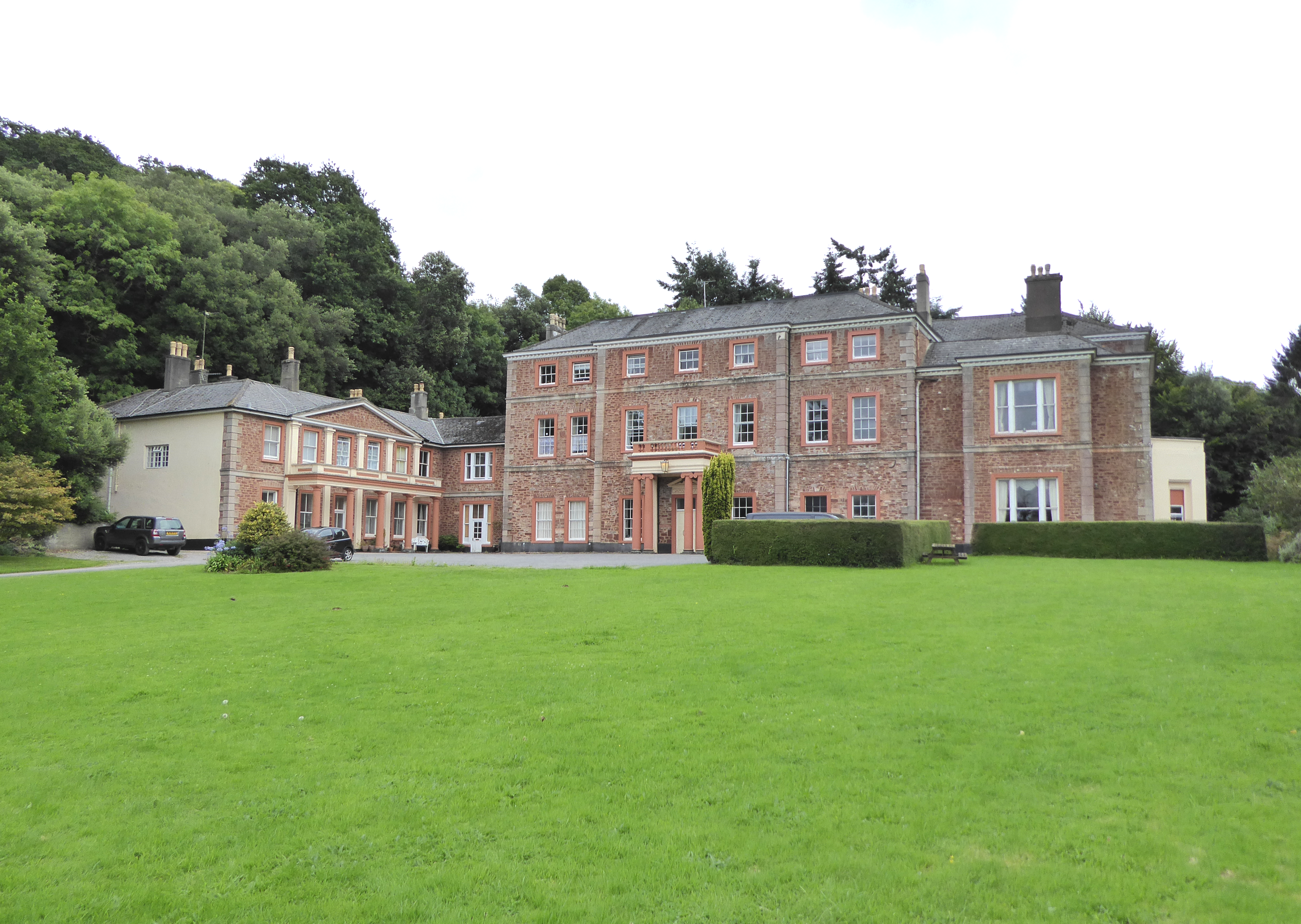
Haccombe House, Devon

- Nicholas Carew (d.1469) of Haccombe, who was given that estate (with Ringmore and Milton) by his mother Joane Courtenay, and where he founded an important branch of the Carew family. Sir Thomas Carew, 1st Baronet (1632–1673) of Haccombe, a Member of Parliament for Tiverton in Devon, was created a baronet in 1661 and although the estate of Haccombe was sold by the family in 1942 the Carew baronetcy "of Haccombe" survives today, the 11th Baronet in 2015 living in Cambridge.
- Hugh Carew, 3rd son, died without progeny. He had been given by his mother the estates of Lyham, Manedon, Comb-Hall, and South Tawton, which passed by entail to his elder brother Nicholas Carew.

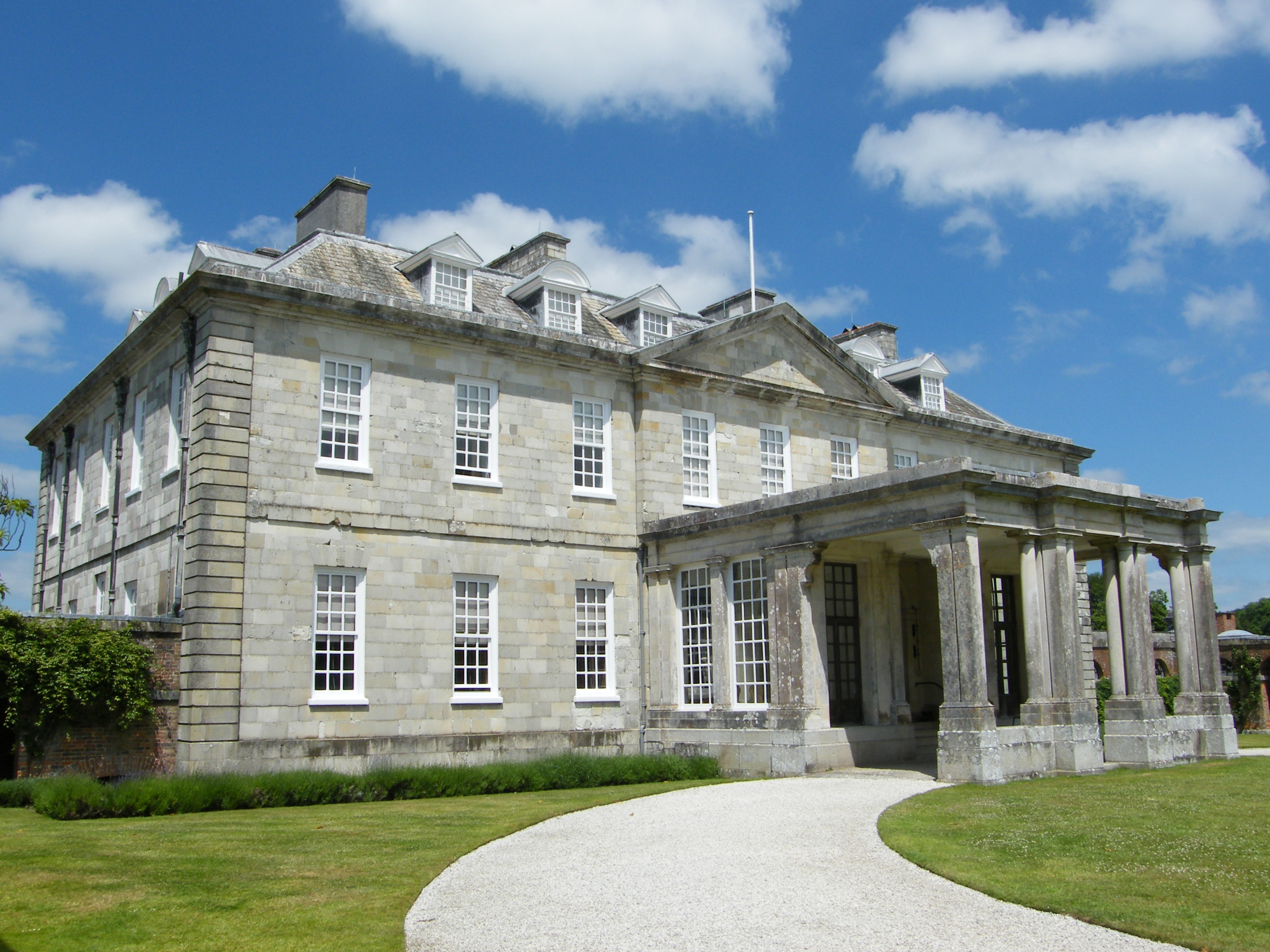
Antony House, Cornwall

- Alexander Carew, 4th son, who received from his mother the estates of East-Anthony in Cornwall, Shoggebroke, and Landegy. He founded the Carew family of Antony in Cornwall. Sir Richard Carew, 1st Baronet (c.1580-1643) of Antony, a Member of Parliament for Cornwall and for St Michael's, was created a baronet in 1641. This baronetcy expired in 1799 on the death of the 8th Baronet. However, the estate of Antony was inherited by marriage by the Pole baronets (created 1628) of Shute, Devon, who later adopted the surname "Carew-Pole", which baronetcy survives today although both Antony House and Shute were given by the family to the National Trust.

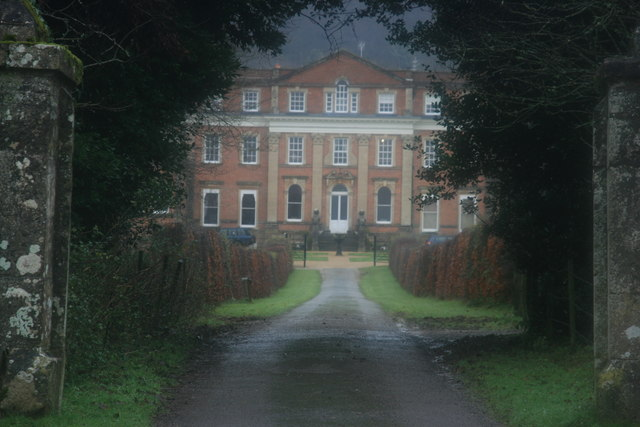
Crowcombe Court, Somerset

- Sir William Carew (d.1501) of Bury St Edmunds in Suffolk, created a knight banneret by King Henry VII, after the Battle of Blackheath (1496). He received from his mother the estates of "Wicheband", "Widebridge", Bokeland (Buckland-in-the-Moor) and "Bledeuagh". His tomb survives on the north side of the chancel of St. Mary's Church, Bury St. Edmunds, with recumbent effigies of himself and his second wife Margaret Chedworth (d.1525), a niece of John Chadworth (d.1471), Bishop of Lincoln, and is near that of Princess Mary Tudor (1496–1533), younger sister of King Henry VIII, wife of King Louis XII of France and secondly of Charles Brandon, 1st Duke of Suffolk (d.1545). His great-grandson Thomas Carew (1639-1604) married the heiress of Crowcombe in Somerset, and founded a branch of the Carew family there, which in the early 19th century recovered possession of the family's most ancient seat of Carew Castle in Pembrokeshire, and was still surviving in the late 19th century. The surviving Palladian mansion of Crowcombe Court was built by Thomas Carew (1702–1766), circa 1724–39 and was described by Nikolaus Pevsner as "the finest house of its date in Somerset south of the Bath area".

==== Thomas Carew (d.1471) ====
Thomas Carew (d.26 November 1471) of Mohuns Ottery, eldest son, who married Joane Carminowe (d.1502), a daughter and co-heiress of Thomas Carminowe. She survived her husband and remarried to Halnathe Mauleverer. He was predeceased by his eldest son and heir apparent:

- Nicholas IV Carew (1444–1470), son and heir apparent, who married Margaret Dynham (d.1471), a daughter of Sir John Dynham (1406–1458) of Nutwell in the parish of Woodbury and of Hartland, both in Devon, and a sister and co-heiress of John Dynham, 1st Baron Dynham (c. 1433–1501), Lord High Treasurer of England and Lord Chancellor of Ireland. Her mother was Joan Arches (died 1497), sister and heiress of John Arches and daughter of Sir Richard Arches (died 1417), a Member of Parliament for Buckinghamshire in 1402, of Eythrope, Cranwell (both in the parish of Waddesdon) and Little Kimble, Buckinghamshire. The purbeck marble chest tomb of Nicholas IV Carew survives in the Chapel of St Nicholas in Westminster Abbey, the ledger stone of which bore a Latin inscription, now effaced. The Devonshire biographer Prince (d.1723) wrote concerning this monument "To whose memory an antient plain tomb of gray marble is there still seen erected with an inscription in brass round the ledg, and some coats of arms on the pedestal". The inscription and arms were still remaining in 1733, but had disappeared by 1877. The Latin epitaph was recorded by Prince as follows:

Orate pro animabus Nicolai Baronis quondam de Carew et Dominae Margaritae uxoris eius filiae Johannis Domini Dinham, militis; qui quidem Nicolaus obiit sexto die mensis Decembris anno dom(ini) 1470. Et praedicta Domina Margareta obiit 13 die mensis Decembris anno 1471.

This may be translated into English as follows: "Pray for the souls of Nicholas, sometime Baron Carew, and of the Lady Margaret his wife, daughter of John, Lord Dinham, Knight; which Nicholas died on the 6th day of the month of December in the year of our Lord 1470 and the aforesaid Lady Margaret died on the 13th day of the month of December in the year 1470".

==== Sir Edmund Carew (1465–1513) ====
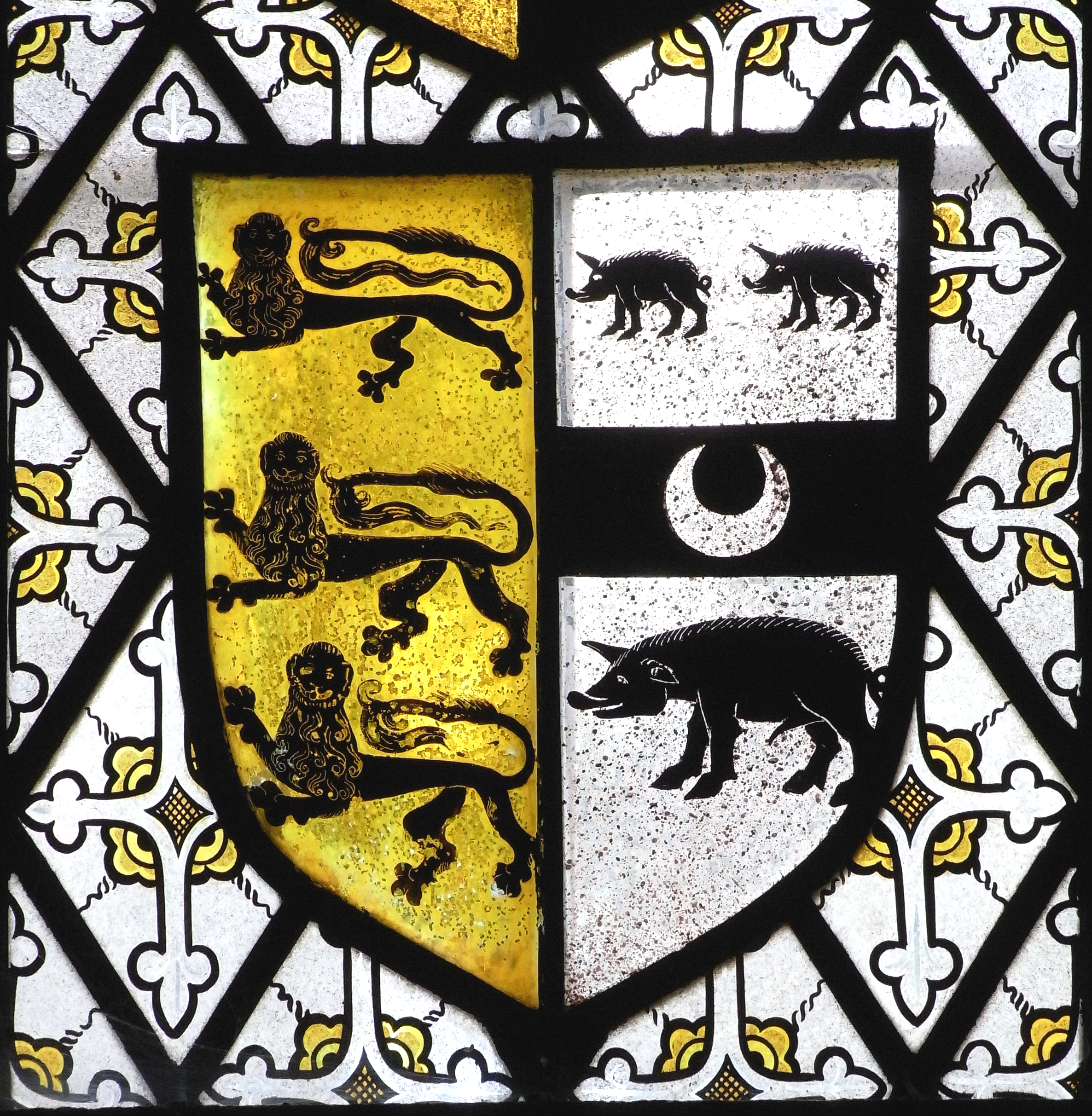
Detail from 19th c. stained glass window in Shillingford St George Church, showing arms of Sir Edmund Carew (1465–1513) of Mohun's Ottery (lions shown here incorrectly as guardant) impaling Huddesfield (Argent, a fess between three boars passant sable (with a crescent argent for difference)), for his wife Katherine Huddesfield (died 1499)

Sir Edmund Carew (1465–1513) of Mohun's Ottery, son of Nicholas IV Carew (1424–1470) and grandson and heir of Thomas Carew (d.1471) of Mohun's Ottery. He was knighted by the victorious King Henry VII at the Battle of Bosworth in 1485 and was killed in action at the Siege of Thérouanne, near Calais in France, on 24 June 1513, by a cannon ball fired from the town, while King Henry VIII sat in council, according to the Chronicle of the Kings of England from the Time of the Romans' Government unto the Death of King James (1643) by Richard Baker. He married Katherine Huddesfield (died 1499) one of the daughters and co-heiresses of Sir William Huddesfield (died 1499) of Shillingford St George in Devon, Attorney General for England and Wales to Kings Edward IV (1461–1483) and Henry VII (1485–1509). He left numerous issue, who with their descendants "multiplied into almost a galaxy of distinguished men that for chivalry and learning took front rank among those who added such brilliancy and renown to the remarkable reign of the Virgin Queen and the early Stuart".

==== Later Carews ====
Later Carew lords of the manor included:

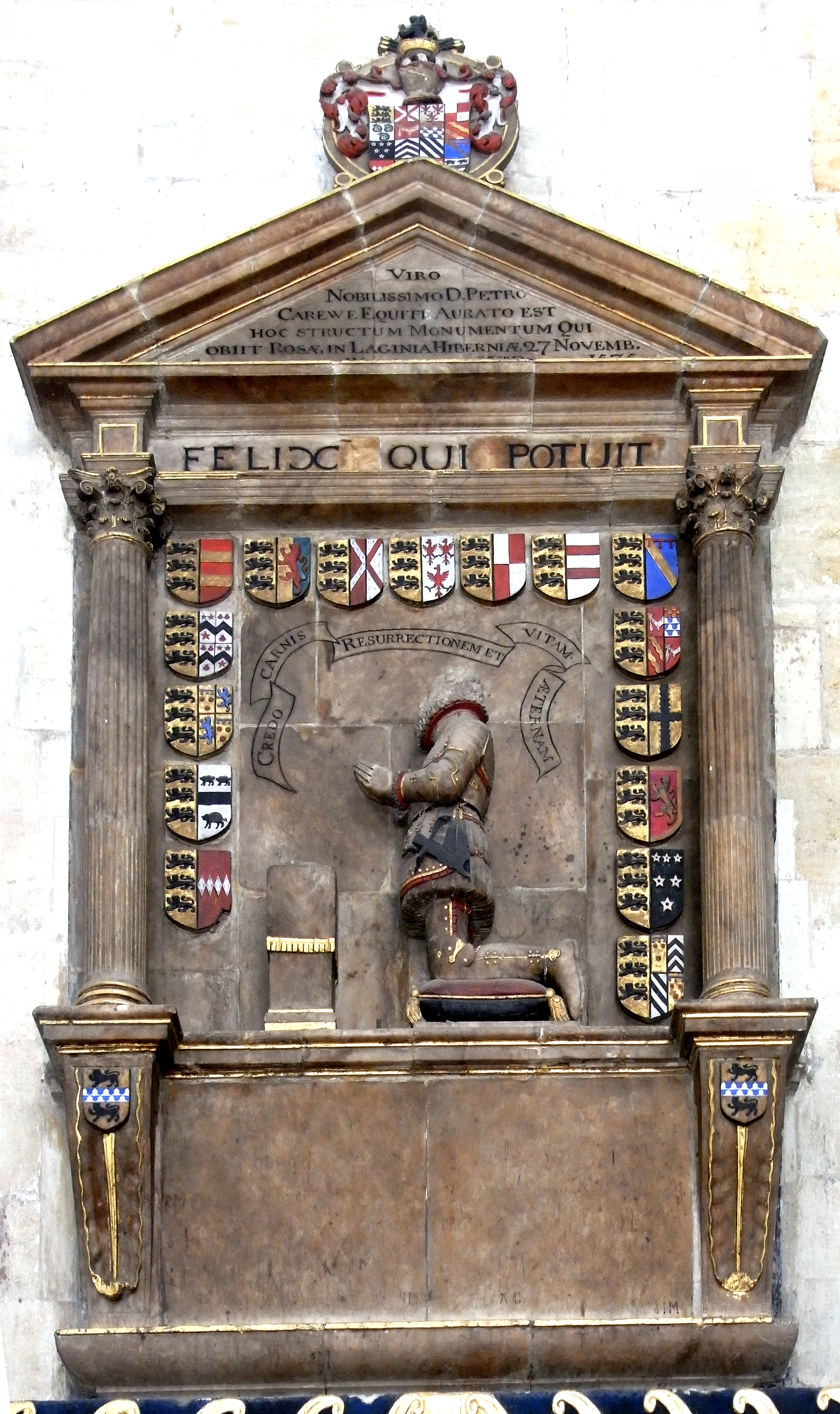
Mural monument in Exeter Cathedral to Sir Peter Carew (d.1575) "the last and most conspicuous member of this family, and who, owing to the decease of his two brothers, George and Philip, before him, was the last male owner also of this antient seat of his name and blood — Mohuns-Ottery, the which, from his initials, P. C, sculptured in the spandrels of the main door-way, he probably re-built or greatly re-edified"

- Sir Edmund Carew (1465–1513), who was knighted by King Henry VII at the Battle of Bosworth in 1485 and was killed in 1513 at the Siege of Thérouanne, in Artois, part of the Battle of the Spurs or Battle of Guinegate. He married Catherine Huddesfield, a daughter and co-heiress of Sir William Huddesfield (died 1499) of Shillingford St George in Devon, Attorney General for England and Wales to Kings Edward IV (1461–1483) and Henry VII (1485–1509).

=== Southcote ===
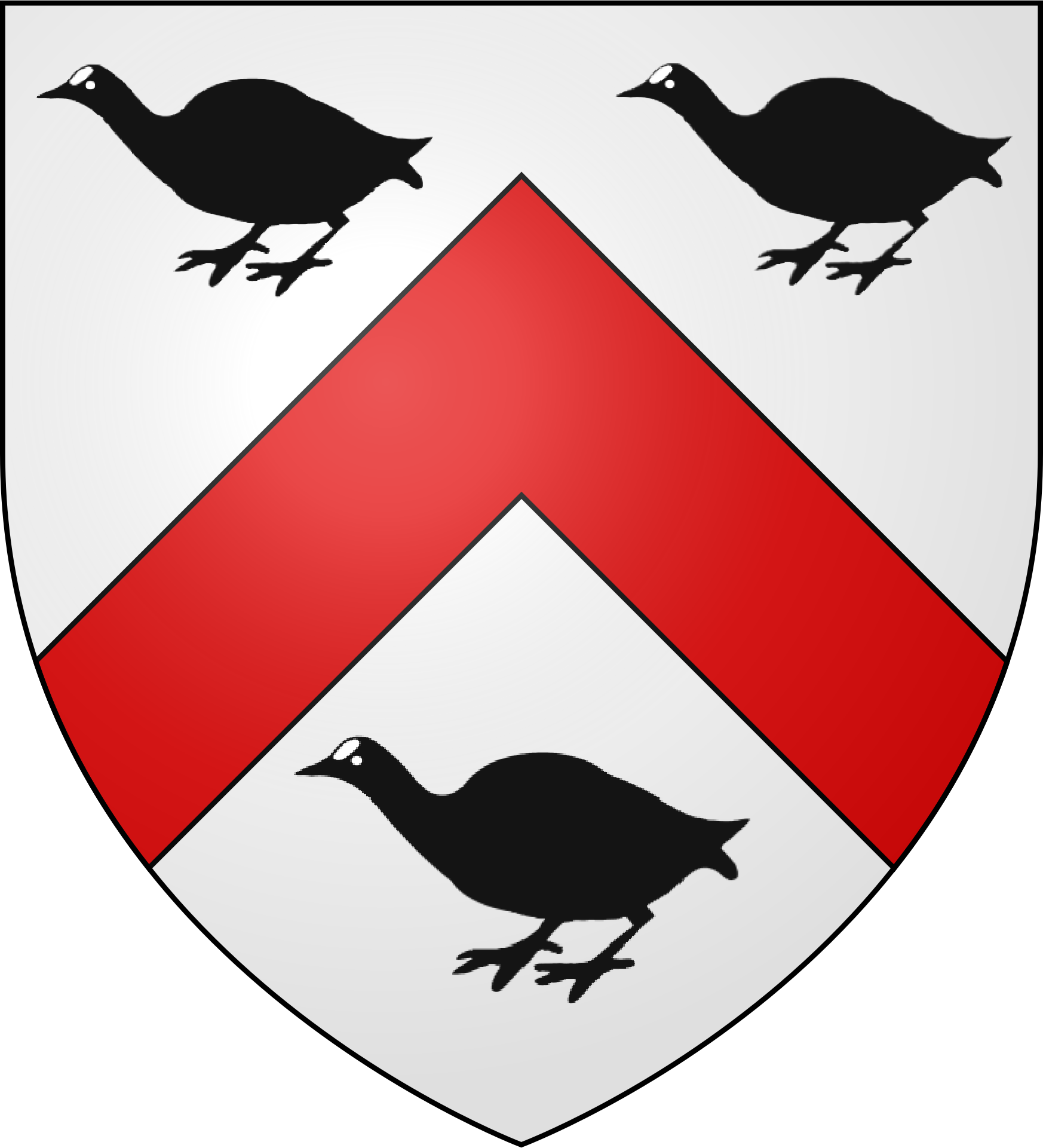
Canting arms of Southcote of Indio in the parish of Bovey Tracey and of Mohuns Ottery: Argent, a chevron gules between three coots sable

- Thomas Southcote (d.1600) of Indio, Bovey Tracey. Sir Peter Carew (d.1575), the last in the male line, settled Mohun's Ottery and other lands on Thomas Southcote (d.1600) of Indio, Bovey Tracey, who had married (as his 2nd wife) Carew's niece, Thomasine Kirkham, daughter of Thomas Kirkham (d.1552) of Blagdon in the parish of Paignton, by his 2nd wife Cicely Carew, sister of Sir Peter Carew (d.1575). Thomas Southcote was in possession in 1589.
- George Southcot (born 1560) of Indio, son and heir, admitted to the Inner Temple in 1575. He married Elizabeth Seymour (d.1589), daughter of Sir Henry Seymour, apparently younger brother of Edward Seymour, 1st Duke of Somerset (c. 1500–1552), KG, Lord Protector of England and brother to Queen Jane Seymour.
- Thomas Southcote of Mohuns Ottery, only son and heir. He married Katherine Pole, 2nd daughter of the Devon historian Sir William Pole (d.1635), of Shute and Colcombe Castle, Devon, MP. In his history of Mohuns Ottery Pole wrote: "Thomas Southcot, Esquier, nowe dwellinge at Mouns Otery, maried Kateryn my 2 daught^{r}, by whom hee hath issue Sir Poph^{a}m Southcot, Kt."
- Sir Popham Southcote (1603–1643) of Indio, eldest son and heir, who married Margaret Berkeley (d.1654), daughter of Sir Maurice Berkeley of Bruton, Somerset. He had three sons, all of whom either died as infants or otherwise predeceased him, and five daughters, two of whom survived him as co-heiresses, married to Brian and Southcote. Most of the lands were dismembered from the manor by the Southcotes in about 1670.

=== Yonge ===
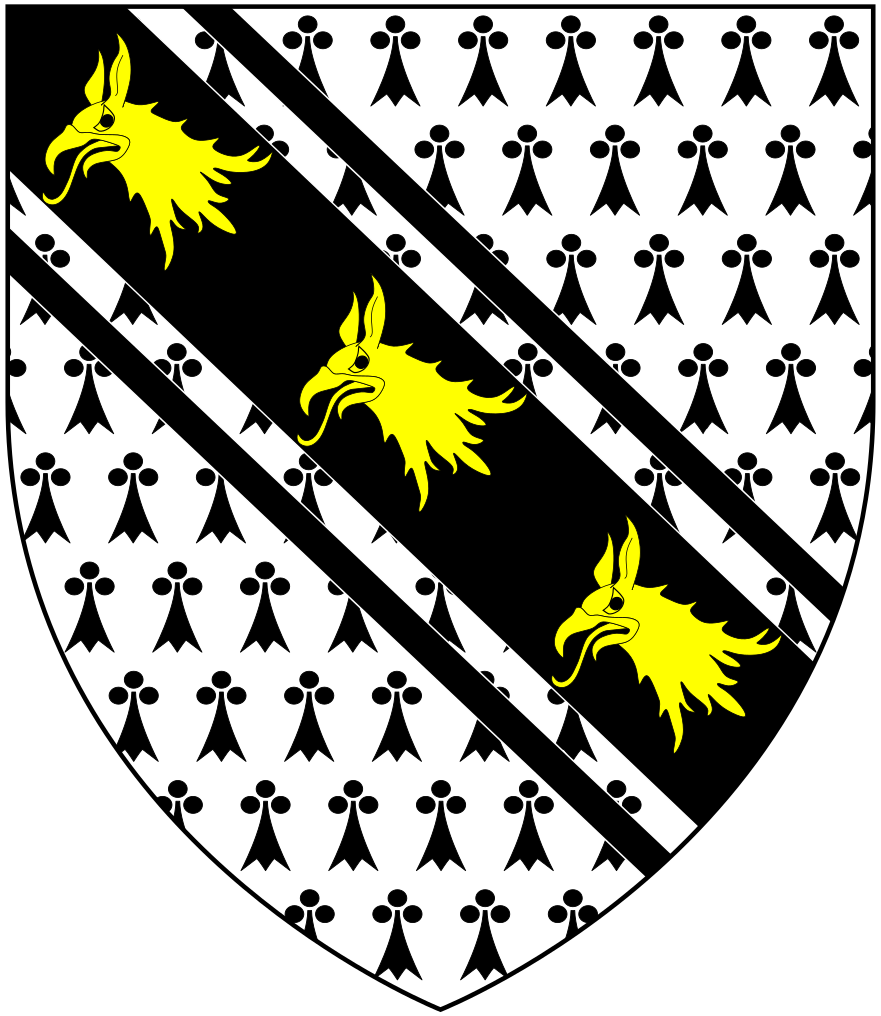
Arms of Yonge: Ermine, on a bend cotised sable three griffin's heads erased or

The manor was purchased (probably from the co-heiresses of Sir Popham Southcote) by Sir Walter Yonge, 2nd Baronet (c.1625-1670), of Great House, Colyton, Devon, who according to the Devon historian Polwhele (d.1838), "had begun to build a seat at the ancient mansion of Mohuns Ottery in the parish of Luppitt, near Ottery, but Sir Walter Yonge, taking a liking to the situation of Escot, purchased it and immediately began to build the present seat". This was his son and heir Sir Walter Yonge, 3rd Baronet (1653–1731), who in about 1680 built Escot House in the parish of Talaton, Devon. (Note: Lysons, 1822: "Sir Walter Yonge, Bart.", thus possibly 2nd or 3rd Baronets. From the court rolls of Mohuns Ottery, apparently the 3rd Bt.)

=== Hawker ===
In about 1793 the estates of Sir George Yonge, 5th Baronet (d.1810), K.B., were sold, including the manors of Luppit and Mohuns Ottery, to William II Hawker (d.1806) of Poundisford Lodge, Pitminster, near Taunton, Somerset. Sir George Yonge, 5th Baronet was MP for Honiton and Secretary at War, but died without progeny, when the baronetcy became extinct. William II Hawker (d.1806) of Poundisford Lodge was the only son of William I Hawker (d.1739) of Luppitt by his wife Mary Sampson. He married Elizabeth Welman, only child of Thomas Welman of Poundisford Park (alias Lower Poundisford). He was described as: (Note: Source describes his father, possibly in error for William II.) "A steady Dissenter and a firm Whig who used to speak with a virtuous glow of his descent on the maternal side from the Reverend and Learned Thomas Sampson, Dean of Christ Church, Oxford, the bold opposer of superstition and tyranny in the reign of Queen Elizabeth"

=== Bernard ===
- Rev. James Bernard (1785–1839). Rev. James Bernard (1785–1839) (born "James Camplin") of Crowcombe and Sidmouth, was the son of Rev. James Camplin, Rector of Coombe Flory, Somerset. He was educated at Eton and King's College, Cambridge. He entered Lincoln's Inn in 1807 and was called to the bar in 1813. In about 1810 he changed his surname to Bernard. This was apparently the result of an inheritance: a certain James Bernard (d.1811), of the Middle Temple, who died without progeny, had inherited Crowcombe Court, Somerset, and Carew Castle in Pembrokeshire, from his wife Elizabeth Carew (d.1805) (whose joint mural monument survives in Crowcombe Church), daughter and heiress of Thomas Carew (d.1766) of Crowcombe Carew, Somerset. Elizabeth Carew's heir to Crowcombe Court and Carew Castle was her cousin Mary Carew (d.1852), wife of George Henry Warrington (d.1842) of Pentrepart Hall, who in 1811 assumed the surname Carew. (Note: A monument Gertrude Pyncombe (d.1730) in Poughill Church near Crediton was erected in 1809, inscribed: "... erected by the Trustees of her Bequests, JAMES BERNARD Esq. of Crowcombe Court Somersetshire. Rev. JAMES CAMPLIN A.M. Rector of Stoodley in this County and of Florey in the County of Somerset in the Year of our Lord 1809") He married Mary Hawker, one of the three daughters and co-heiresses of William II Hawker (d.1806), and was the proprietor of Mohuns Ottery in 1822. Lysons (1822) stated: "Some part of the ancient mansion of the barons Carew is still remaining, and occupied as a farm-house. The park has been long ago converted into tillage". A deed of partition had been signed in 1808 splitting the Hawker patrimony between the three Hawker sisters and co-heiresses. James Bernard owned the library of "Thomas Carew", and made it available to Joshua Toulmin, for researching his work "History of the Town of Taunton".
- Rev. William Bernard (son). In 1850 Rev. William Bernard of Clatworthy, Somerset, was lord of the manors of Luppitt and Mohun's Ottery, but the manor house was being used as a farmhouse. In 1870 Mohuns Ottery was occupied by James Bishop, a farmer, but "W.H. Bernard" was still lord of the manor of Luppitt.

=== 20th century ===
In 1986 "Mohuns Ottery Farm" was occupied by Arthur Francis William Blackmore (born 1911), chairman of the Luppitt Commons Committee, who had lived in the parish of Luppitt all his life. At that date a "Miss Barnard" still lived in the parish, at Wren Cottage.

== Sources ==
- Hamilton Rogers, William Henry, Memorials of the West, Historical and Descriptive, Collected on the Borderland of Somerset, Dorset and Devon, Exeter, 1888, chapter "The Nest of Carew (Ottery-Mohun)", pp. 269–330, esp. pp. 286 et seq.
- Lysons, Samuel & Daniel, Magna Britannia, Vol.6: Devon, London, 1822, Parishes – "Luppit, or Luppitt". pp. 323–5
- Pevsner, Nikolaus & Cherry, Bridget, The Buildings of England: Devon, London, 2004. ISBN 978-0-300-09596-8
- Pole, Sir William (d.1635), Collections Towards a Description of the County of Devon, Sir John-William de la Pole (ed.), London, 1791, pp. 128–31, Loveputt and Carew's Pedigree
- Risdon, Tristram (d.1640), Survey of Devon, 1811 edition, London, 1811, with 1810 Additions
- Sanders, I.J. English Baronies: A Study of their Origin and Descent 1086–1327, Oxford, 1960
- Thorn, Caroline & Frank, (eds.) Domesday Book, (Morris, John, gen.ed.) Vol. 9, Devon, Parts 1 & 2, Phillimore Press, Chichester, 1985. ISBN 0-85033-492-6.
- Thorn, Caroline & Frank. "Devon notes" (download page for RTF document). Digital Repository. The University of Hull. Retrieved 6 May 2016. (An updated version of volume 2 of the above 1985 printed work.)
- Vivian, Lt.Col. J.L., (Ed.) The Visitations of the County of Devon: Comprising the Heralds' Visitations of 1531, 1564 & 1620, Exeter, 1895. Volume 1 (pdf), pp. 133–135, "Carew"; Volume 2 (pdf), pp. 698–9, "Southcott of Southcott"
- Watts, Victor (ed.), The Cambridge Dictionary of English Place-Names. Cambridge University Press, 2004. ISBN 978-0-521-16855-7
