= Richard Southcote =

English politician

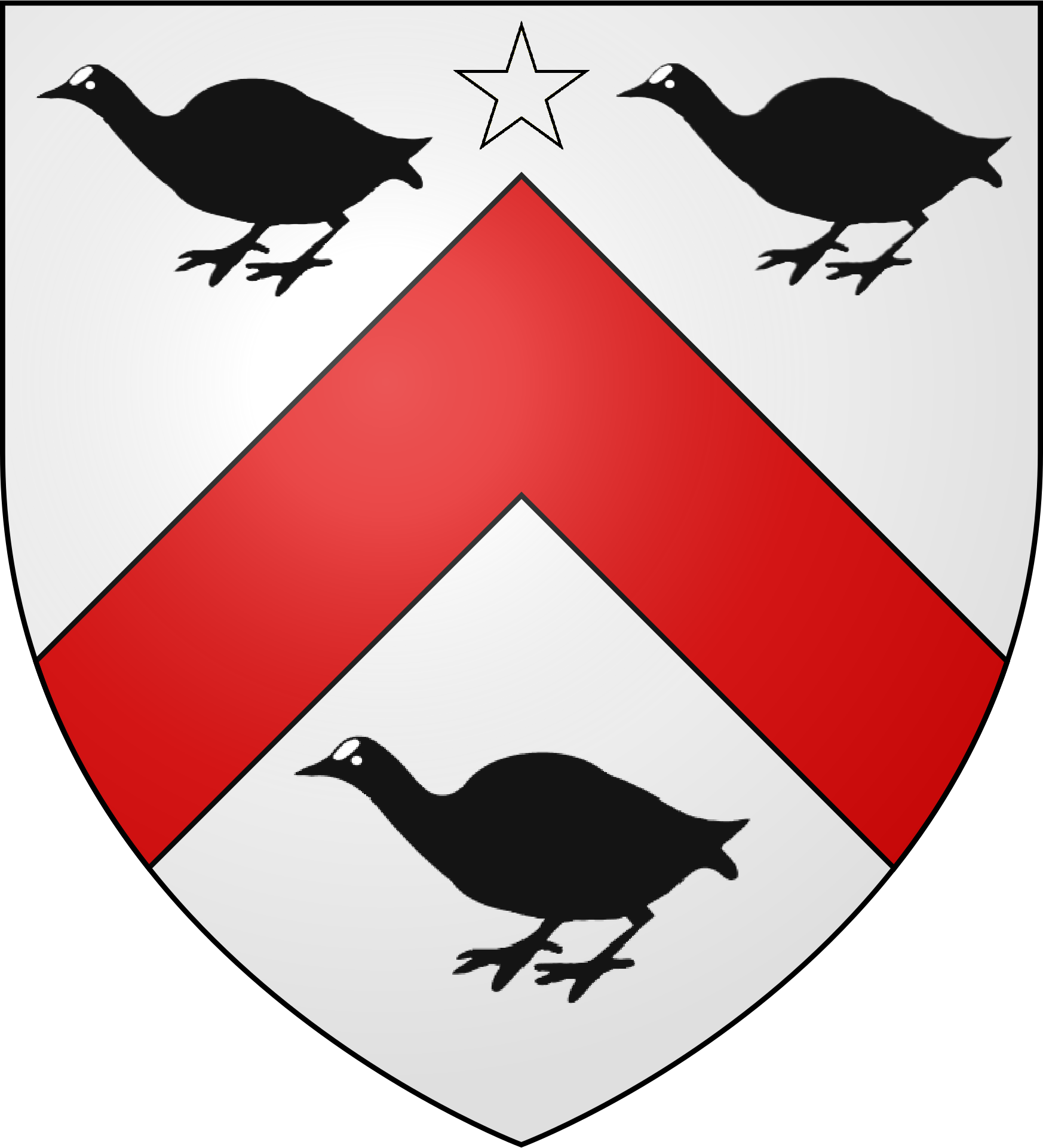
Arms of the Southcote family of Shillingford. Argent, a chevron gules, between three coots sable, a mullet for difference.

Richard Southcote of the Inner Temple, London and Shillingford (1570–1594) was an English politician and landowner.

He was a younger son of Thomas Southcote of Bovey Tracey by his 3rd wife Elizabeth, the daughter of George Fitzwilliam of Mablethorpe, Lincolnshire.

He was admitted to the Inner Temple in 1589. He was a Member (MP) of the Parliament of England for Plympton Erle in 1593, a seat which his father had sat for in 1558.

He died unmarried in 1594, leaving his younger brother George as his heir.
