= Indio, Bovey Tracey =

Coordinates: 50.587°N 3.673°W

Indio House
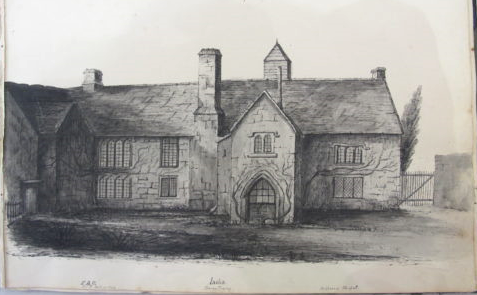
- Indio in 1844, drawn by Elizabeth Croker. Demolished and re-built in 1850.

- Location within Devon
- Civil parish: Bovey Tracey
- Unitary authority: Teignbridge
- Ceremonial county: Devon
- Region: South West
- Country: England
- Sovereign state: United Kingdom
- Post town: NEWTON ABBOT
- Postcode district: TQ13
- Dialling code: 01822
- Police: Devon and Cornwall
- Fire: Devon and Somerset
- Ambulance: South Western

Indio (anciently Indehoe, Indiho, etc.) in the parish of Bovey Tracey in Devon, is an historic estate. The present large mansion house, known as Indio House is a grade II listed building rebuilt in 1850, situated about 1/2 mile south of Bovey Tracey Church, on the opposite side of the River Bovey. According to the Devon historian Pole (d.1635) it was originally a priory, however research from 1840 onwards has suggested it was more likely merely a grange farm, a possession of St John's Hospital, Bridgwater, Somerset, from 1216.

== Descent ==
=== St John's Hospital, Bridgwater ===
In 1219 Henry de Tracy, feudal baron of Barnstaple and lord of the manor of Bovey Tracey, gave the church and some lands within the manor, including Indio, to St John's Hospital in Bridgwater, Somerset. The endowment was confirmed in 1227 and continued until the Dissolution of the Monasteries circa 1540.

=== Southcott ===
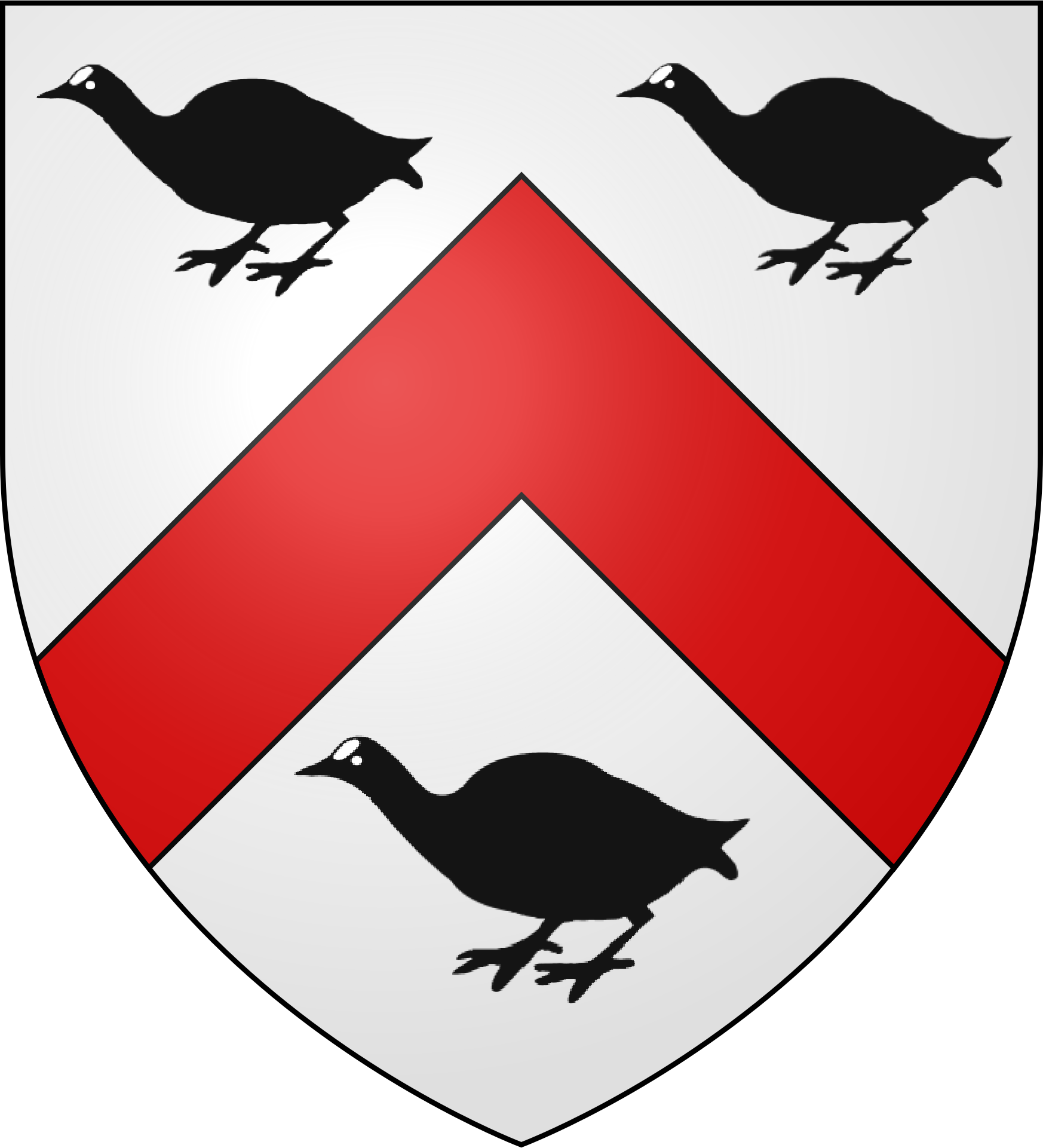
Canting arms of Southcote of Indio in the parish of Bovey Tracey and of Mohuns Ottery: Argent, a chevron gules between three coots sable, alternative arms of the Southcott family

==== John Southcott (1481-1556) ====
In 1544, following the Dissolution of the Monasteries, Indio and Ullacombe, both in the parish of Bovey Tracey, were granted to John Southcott of Bodmin and John Tregonwell of Middleton. The earliest recorded secular inhabitant of Indio was John Southcott (d.1556), who in the words of the Devon historian Pole (d.1635): "Bwilded a fayre howse & dwelled theire". He was a Clerk of the Peace for Devon, and was the 2nd son of Nicholas Southcott of Southcott, in the parish of Winkleigh, Devon. He was steward of Thomas Cromwell by which relationship he obtained several monastic holdings in Devonshire on favourable terms. An ancient document exists, in connection with the Dissolution accounts, which refers to "Rent of a messuage in Yondyeo leased on 15 July 1531 to John Southcote, his wife Joan and Johns’s heirs for ever, 26s 8d".

==== Thomas Southcote (1528-1600) ====
Thomas Southcote (1528–1600), eldest son and heir, who married three times:

- Firstly to Grace Barnehouse, daughter and sole heiress of John Barnehouse of Marsh in the parish of Newton St Cyres and of Prestcot in the parish of Culmstock, both in Devon, a younger branch of Barnehouse of Kingston in the parish of Staverton, Devon. By Grace Barnehouse he had two surviving daughters, co-heiresses to their mother:
  - Mary Soutcott, eldest daughter, married to Thomas Ridgeway (1543–1598) of Tor Mohun, Devon (son of John Ridgeway (c. 1517 – 1560) of Abbots Carswell and Tor Mohun, MP), a Member of Parliament for Dartmouth in 1584. Her eldest son was Thomas Ridgeway, 1st Earl of Londonderry (c.1565-1631). She is mentioned on a tablet on the grand Ridgeway monument in Tor Mohun Church as E clara Southcottorum familia et Barnehusii cohaerede faemina virtute pietate ac modestia ornatissima ("from the illustrious family of the Southcotts and a co-heiress of Barnehouse, a lady most decorated with virtue, piety and modesty").
  - Elizabeth Southcott, wife of Sir Anthony Rouse (c.1555-1620), of Halton in Cornwall, a Member of Parliament for East Looe in Cornwall in 1584 and for Cornwall in 1604. He possessed almost 10,000 acres of land and was one of Cornwall's richest residents. Her daughter Elizabeth Rouse married (as his first wife) John Northcote (1570–1632) of Uton and Hayne, Newton St Cyres, Devon, lord of the manor of Newton St Cyres, who is chiefly remembered for his artistically acclaimed effigy and monument in Newton St Cyres Church, who (by his second wife) was the ancestor of the Northcote baronets and Earls of Iddesleigh, still resident at Newton St Cyres today.
- Secondly he married Thomasine Kirkham, daughter of Thomas Kirkham (d.1552) of Blagdon in the parish of Paignton, by his 2nd wife Cicely Carew, sister of Sir Peter Carew (d.1575) of Mohun's Ottery in the parish of Luppitt, Devon, the last in the male line. Carew settled Mohun's Ottery and other lands on Thomas Southcote (d.1600) of Indio, the husband of his niece. By Thomasine Kirkham he had numerous issue, seated at Indio and Mohun's Ottery.
- Thirdly he married Elizabeth FitzWilliam.

==== George Southcot (born 1560) ====
George Southcot (born 1560) of Indio, son and heir by his father's 2nd wife Thomasine Kirkham. He was admitted to the Inner Temple in 1575. He married Elizabeth Seymour (d.1589), daughter of Sir Henry Seymour, apparently younger brother of Edward Seymour, 1st Duke of Somerset (c. 1500–1552), KG, Lord Protector of England and brother to Queen Jane Seymour.

==== Thomas Southcote ====
Thomas Southcote of Mohuns Ottery, only son and heir. He married Katherine Pole, 2nd daughter of the Devon historian Sir William Pole (d.1635), of Shute and Colcombe Castle, Devon, MP. In his history of Mohuns Ottery Pole wrote: "Thomas Southcot, Esquier, nowe dwellinge at Mouns Otery, maried Kateryn my 2 daught^{r}, by whom hee hath issue Sir Poph^{a}m Southcot, Kt."

==== Sir Popham Southcote (1603-1643) ====
Sir Popham Southcote (1603–1643) of Indio, eldest son and heir. Popham's grandfather Sir William Pole (d.1635), the Devon historian, stated in his history of Indio that Thomas Southcott "hath bestowed it uppon S^{r} Popham Southcot his eldest sonne, w^{ch} nowe dwelleth theire". He married Margaret Berkeley (d.1654), daughter of Sir Maurice Berkeley of Bruton, Somerset. He had three sons, all of whom either died as infants or otherwise predeceased him, and five daughters, two of whom survived him as co-heiresses, married to Brian and Southcote. Most of the lands were dismembered from the manor of Mohun's Ottery by the Southcotes in about 1670.

=== Tufnell / Indio Pottery ===
In about 1766 a pottery was established at Indio, then seemingly owned by "George Forster Tufnell", apparently the same man as George Forster Tufnell (1723–1798), of Turnham Green, Middlesex and of Chichester, Sussex, who was twice a Member of Parliament for Beverley in Yorkshire. The founders of the business were either Tufnell himself, or Tufnell in partnership with William Ellis (born 1742 in Bovey Tracey) or Hammersley or Nicholas Crisp (d.1774). According to Massey (2001) "The Indio Pottery established the reputation of Bovey Tracey as a centre of industrial pottery production". Nicholas Crisp arrived in Bovey Tracey in 1767 intending to produce porcelain to rival the output of the well-established Staffordshire Potteries. However the business did not prosper and Crisp was imprisoned for debt in 1768. He subsequently continued production at Indio with his wife until his death in 1774. the next manager was William Ellis, and it was his operation at Indio which was visited by the great Staffordshire potter Josiah Wedgwood in 1775, on his way to inspect the potteries in Cornwall. In his diary he recorded his unflattering opinion of the factory: "It is a poor trifling concern & conducted in a wretched slovenly manner". In 1785 Indio Pottery was insolvent and unable to pay wages, and was in a "reduced and declining state suffering continual loss".

==== Further reading ====
- Stretton, Norman, The Indio Pottery at Bovey Tracey, Transactions of English Ceramic Circle, Vol.8, Part 2, 1972
- Adams, Brian & Thomas, Anthony, A Potwork in Devonshire: The History and Products of the Bovey Tracey Potteries 1750-1836, Bovey Tracey, 1996
- Ellis, William IV (grandson of William Ellis the potter), article on Indio Pottery published in Saturday American, 1883

=== Bentinck ===
Arms of Bentinck: Azure, a cross moline argent

Indio was later a seat of a branch of the Bentinck family, lords of the manor of Bovey Tracey, who were of Dutch origin. Hans Willem Bentinck, 1st Earl of Portland had accompanied William Henry, Prince of Orange to England during the Glorious Revolution of 1688. In 1716 the family was created Duke of Portland, and the last in the male line was Victor Frederick William Cavendish-Bentinck, 9th Duke of Portland (1897–1990), on whose death without surviving male issue the dukedom became extinct, although the Earldom of Portland was inherited by his distant cousin.

==== Captain John Albert Bentinck ====
Captain John Albert Bentinck (1737–1775), Royal Navy, a Member of Parliament for Rye in Sussex (1761–8) of Terrington St Clement in Norfolk, a Count of the Empire, was a grandson of Hans Willem Bentinck, 1st Earl of Portland, being one of the two sons of Hon. William Bentinck, 1st Count Bentinck (1704–1774), by his wife Charlotte Sophie, Countess von Aldenburg (1715–1800). In 1763 Captain John Albert Bentinck married Renira van Tuyll van Serooskerken (d.1792), 2nd daughter of John, Baron de Tuyll de Serooskerken.

==== William Bentinck ====
Vice-Admiral William Bentinck (1764–1813), Royal Navy, son. In 1802 he married Frances Augusta Pierrepont, only daughter of Charles Pierrepont, 1st Earl Manvers.

==== George William Pierrepont Bentinck (1803-1886) ====
George William Pierrepont Bentinck (1803–1886), son, of Terrington St Clement in Norfolk, a Member of Parliament, died unmarried aged 82.

==== Charles Aldenburg Bentinck (1810-1891) ====
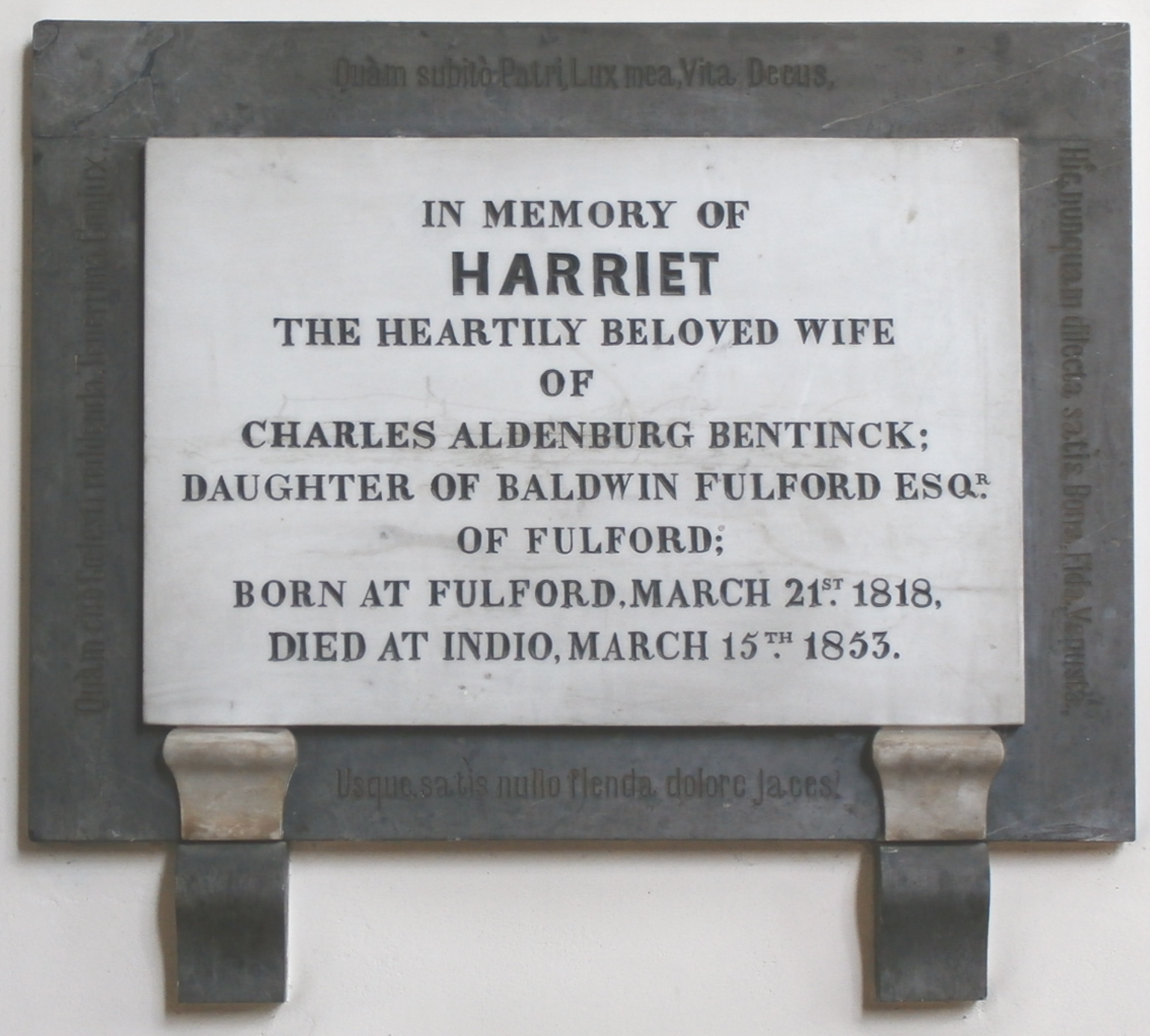
Mural monument in Bovey Tracey Church to Harriet Fulford (1818–1853), 1st wife of Charles Aldenburg Bentinck (1810–1891) of Indio

Charles Aldenburg Bentinck (1810–1891), brother, of Terrington St Clement in Norfolk, a Justice of the Peace for Devon. In 1849 he married firstly Harriet Fulford (1818–1853), 3rd daughter of Col. Baldwin Fulford (1775–1847), of Great Fulford in the parish of Dunsford (6 miles north of Indio), an officer in the Inniskillen Dragoons and Lieutenant-Colonel of the Devon Militia. In 1850 he rebuilt Indio House, to the design of the Exeter architect David Mackintosh. The resultant house, which survives today, was described by Pevsner as "Austere Tudor relieved by romantic crenellated chimney-stacks". Above the front door is a datestone inscribed "1850" with the initials "CAB", with the arms of Bentinck and the family's motto Craignez Honte ("fear disgrace"). He purchased the lordship of the manor of Bovey Tracey from William Courtenay, Earl of Devon. His first wife died in 1853, aged 35, only 4 years after their marriage, and is commemorated by a mural monument in Bovey Tracey Church. He married secondly to Frances Williams (1816–1904), 2nd daughter of Martin Williams of Bryngwyn, Montgomeryshire, who erected a brass tablet in Bovey Tracey Church to her husband, and is herself similarly commemorated.

==== Henry Aldenburg Bentinck (1852-1938) ====
Henry Aldenburg Bentinck (1852–1938), 2nd and eldest surviving son, of Indio, a barrister and Justice of the Peace for Devon. In 1890 he married Alma Martha Paget, eldest daughter of Admiral Lord Clarence Edward Paget. In 1912 he installed electric lighting in Bovey Tracey Church, in memory of his parents, as is recorded on a marble wall tablet.

The estate employed twenty staff, including five gardeners.

Following his death in London in 1938, Indio (with Indio Pond) was sold by the Bentinck family in 1939, with 1.5 miles of trout fishing on the River Bovey and 400 acres.

Today the house retains only about 25 acres of the original estate. The Indio Pottery (1750 -1836), situated to the east of pre-1850 house, was connected by a leat (c. 1810–11) to the "Pond Garden Pottery" and the Indio Pond or Lakes. Indio Pond is today separately owned.

=== Whybrow ===
In 1964 Indio was purchased by retired businessman Alfred Edward Whybrow of Woolwich in South London, the son of a boiler-stoker from East London, who had sold his businesses Meadowbank Estates and Castle Sports, a chain of shops with about 15 branches in North London and South Essex. He employed a team of builders who worked on renovations for three years. His grandson, Nicholas Chulapat Nakorn (born 1956), whose father originated in Thailand, is the author of Blood in the River, which relates his experiences growing up as a mixed-race child in rural England, and describes his childhood holidays at Indio. The family sold Indio in 1997.
