= Southcott family =

Family from Devon and Cornwall, England

Southcott Southcote
- Minor nobility and Landed Gentry family
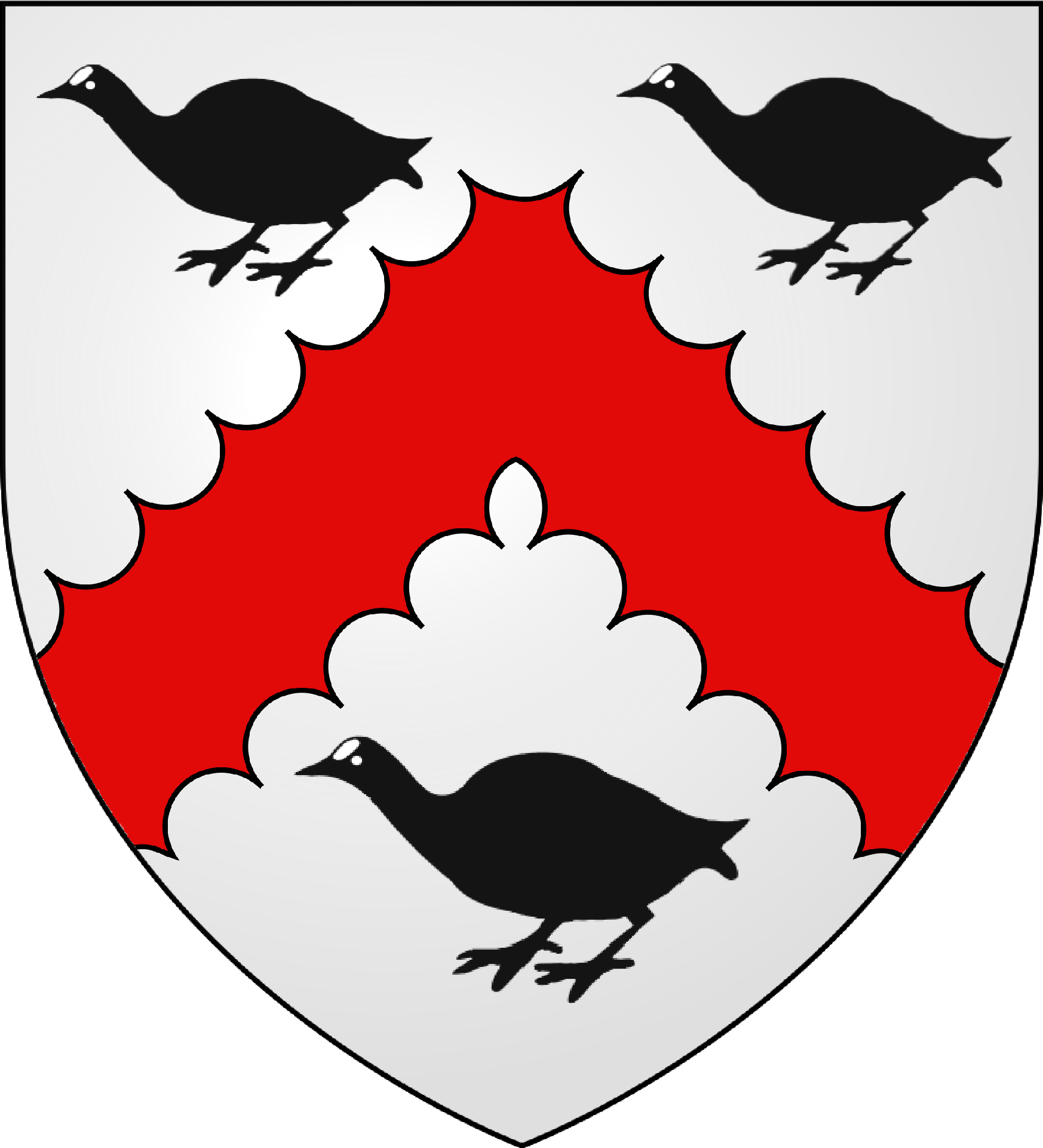
- Coat of arms of the Southcott Family. Argent, a chevron engrailed gules between three coots sable
- Founded: 1243; 783 years ago
- Founder: Michael de Southcott of Southcott
- Titles: Baronets, Knights, Esquires, Manorial Lords and Gentlemen
- Motto: Nerth Dre Lelder (Cornish: Strength Through Loyalty)
- Estates: Southcott House, Devon; Indio, Bovey Tracey, Devon; Witham Place, Essex; Mohuns Ottery, Devon; Lesnewth, Cornwall; Blyborough Hall, Lincolnshire; Woburn Park, Surrey; Buckland House, Devon; Sowenna, Cornwall

Southcott is a surname of an ancient and prominent family from the English counties of Devon and Cornwall.

== History ==
The surname Southcott is first recorded by Michael de Suthcot, Lord of Suthcot in the 13th century, and later recorded by Sir Nicholas Southcott Jr of Southcott and Chudleigh (1450–1512) in the 15th century. According to the Survey of Devon by Tristram Risdon (b.1580), "Michael de Southcott Lord of Southcott was from whom issued divers families. For he was the original of a great kindred in this country". Micheal was originally from Bodmin moor and gained the Southcott estate from the Oliver De Chambernon in 1242, whose family had been granted the estate after the Norman Conquest.

Sir Nicholas's son, John Southcott Esq of Bovey Tracey (1481–1556), in 1544, following the Dissolution of the Monasteries, was granted Indio. At the time he was steward to Thomas Cromwell which led to him obtaining several monastic holdings in Devonshire on favourable terms. A document in connection with the Dissolution accounts refers to "Rent of a messuage in Yondyeo leased on 15 July 1531 to John Southcote, his wife Joan and Johns's heirs for ever, 26s 8d". {{citation needed}} He was also made Clerk of the Peace for Devon. In 1547 he was elected as MP of Lostwithiel, making him a prominent politician in Cornwall. During Edward VI's reforms to religion in Cornwall, part of the English Reformation and the Tudors' deconstruction of Cornish national identity, he was a participant and supporter of the Prayer Book Rebellion in Cornwall and Devon. After the rebellion was crushed by Edward Seymour, 1st Duke of Somerset's army, John Southcote was not hanged and a few years later he was granted a general pardon by Edward VI and continued to sit in Parliament.

Sir Nicholas's second son William Southcott Esq of Chudleigh (b.1485) had a son also called John, of Witham (1510–1585). He became a senior English judge and politician, becoming later Lord of the Manor of Witham, in Essex. He was noted to be a proud Catholic and supporter of his uncle's involvement in the Prayer Book Rebellion and later resigned his office rather than condemn a Catholic priest publicly.

Another descendant of Sir Nicholas Southcott was Capt. Philip Southcote (1698–1758) who married the widowed 1st Duchess of Southampton, Anne Fitzroy.

During the Civil War, Captain Thomas Southcote was the garrison commander of Calstock as a prominent officer of the Royalists in Cornwall; the garrison consisted of roughly 1,200 Cornishmen and was quartered at Cotehele and Harewood House. During the war, the Parliamentarians attacked Gunnislake New Bridge, which was defended by Sir Richard Grenville and Captain Southcote with men from his garrison at Calstock. At the cost of 240 men the bridge was lost to the Parliamentarian forces, but they failed to advance further into Cornwall.

== Lords of the Manor of Southcott (1242–1565) ==
- Michael Southcot Esq of Southcot (b.c1202)
- William Southcott Esq of Southcot (b.c1233)
- Michael Southcott Esq of Winkleigh (b.c1258)
- William Southcott Esq of Southcott
- Michael Southcotte Esq of Southcotte (b.c1325)
- William Southcote Esq of Southcote (b.c1360)
- William Southcote Esq of Southcote (b.c1390)
- Nicholas Southcote Esq of Southcote and Chudleigh (b.c1419)
- Sir Nicholas Southcott of Southcott and Chudleigh (1450–1512)
- Thomas Southcot Esq of Southcot (b.c1483)
- John Southcott Esq of Southcot (b.c1510)
- John Southcot Esq of Southcot
- Phillip Southcott Esq of Southcott (1527–1587)

== Lords of the Manor of Bovey Tracey (1544–1670) ==
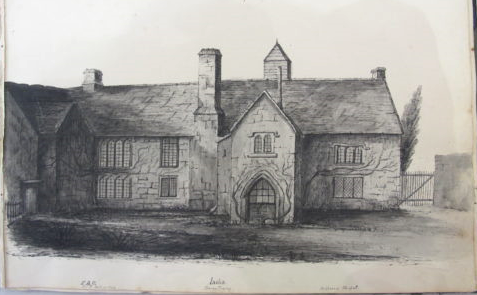
Indio House the manor house of Bovey Tracey, former seat of the Southcott Family

- John Southcote MP of Bovey Tracey, (1481–1556)
- Thomas Southcote MP of Bovey Tracey and of Mohuns Ottery, (1528–1600)
- George Southcot of Bovey Tracey and of Mohuns Ottery, (born 1560)
- Thomas Southcote of Bovey Tracey and of Mohuns Ottery (d.1678)
- Sir Popham Southcote Kt of Bovey Tracey and of Mohuns Ottery, (1603–1643)

== Lord of the Manor of Mohuns Ottery (1598–1670) ==
- Thomas Southcote MP of Bovey Tracey and of Mohuns Ottery, (1528–1600)
- George Southcot of Bovey Tracey and of Mohuns Ottery, (born 1560)
- Thomas Southcote of Bovey Tracey and of Mohuns Ottery (d.1678)
- Sir Popham Southcote Kt of Bovey Tracey and of Mohuns Ottery, (1603–1643)

== Lords of Blyborough and Baronets of Blyborough (1610–1691) ==
- Sir George Southcote MP of Blyborough, Shillingford, Stoke Fleming and Withycombe (1572–1638)
- George Southcote of Stoke Fleming and Blyborough
- Thomas Southcote MP DL JP of Buckland, Stoke Fleming and Blyborough (1622–1664)
- Sir George Southcote, 1st Baronet of Blyborough (1629–1663)
- Sir George Southcote, 2nd Baronet and Governor of Dartmouth Castle (1664–1691)

=== Southcote Baronets family chart ===
Sir George Southcott MP of Blyborough, Shillingford, Stoke Fleming and Withycombe (1572-1638)
Robert Southcote of Shillingford	George Southcote of Stoke Fleming and Blyborough	Capt. Thomas Southcott of Withycombe (1608-1657)	Judith	Mary	Rebecca
Thomas Southcote; MP DL JP of Stoke Fleming and Blyborough (c1622-1664)	Sir George Southcote Bt; 1st Baronet of Bliborough; Created 1662 (1629-1663)	Lady Catherine Southcote (Née Eliot)
Sir William Portman; Bt KB MP FRS; 6th Baronet of Orchard Portman (1664-1690)	Lady Elizabeth Portman	Sir George Southcote Bt; 2nd Baronet of Bliborough (1664-1698)	Lady Mary Southcote (Née Smythe)	Katherine Palmer
Katherine Smith	Constantine Fitzherbert

== Notable people ==
=== Thomas Southcot ===
Capt. Thomas Southcot (1608–1657) was an officer of the Cavalier Army during the First English Civil War, the early part of the English Civil War. He was the son of Sir George Southcott MP (1572–1638). In 1644 he was the garrison commander of the Cavalier army based at Calstock and Cotehele, a detachments of Sir Richard Grenville's army based on the Cornish side of the Tamar Valley. He defended Cornwall from Robert Devereux, 3rd Earl of Essex Parliamentarians force.

Following the battle, an island which was defended by the Royalists was named Southcott Island in honour of the commander.

Thomas Southcot died in 1657, never witnessing the restoration of the monarchy in 1661. King Charles II did recognise Thomas's tremendous loyalty by awarding his only son George Southcote (1629–1663) with the title of Baronet of Bliborough.

=== Members of Parliament ===
- John Southcote MP of Bovey Tracey and Shillingford (c1481-1556) was MP for Lostwithiel. He was appointed Clerk of the Peace of Devon.
- Sir John Southcote QC SL MP of London and Witham (1510–1585) was MP for Lewes and later Steyning.
- Thomas Southcote MP of Bovey Tracey, Mohuns Ottery, Stoke Fleming and Shillingford (1528–1600) was MP for Tavistock, then Plympton Erle and later Dartmouth. He was also appointed High Sheriff of Devon.
- George Southcote MP of London and Calverleigh (1533–1589) was MP for Lostwithiel and later Tavistock.
- Richard Southcote MP of the Inner Temple, London and Shillingford (1570–1594) was MP for Plympton Erle.
- Sir George Southcote MP of Blyborough, Shillingford, Stoke Fleming and Withycombe (1572–1638) was MP for Plympton Erle. He was also appointed High Sheriff of Devon.
- Thomas Southcote MP DL JP of Buckland, Stoke Fleming and Blyborough (1622–1664) was MP for Dartmouth. He was also appointed Deputy lieutenant of Devon.

=== High Sheriff ===
- Thomas Southcote MP of Bovey Tracey, Mohuns Ottery, Stoke Fleming and Shillingford (1528–1600) was appointed Sheriff of Devon on 23 November 1558 and 13 November 1570.
- Sir George Southcote MP of Blyborough, Shillingford, Stoke Fleming and Withycombe (1572–1638) was appointed Sheriff of Devon on 11 November 1616.
- George Southcott Esq of Buckland was appointed Sheriff of Devon on 12 November 1652.
- John Henry Southcote of Buckland was appointed High Sheriff of Devon in 1785.

== Family prayer ==
=== Cornish ===
An Teylu Sothdyji Pysadow
ADHEW Ollgallosek, Gwitha war a'gan gen bro ha gen mor. Yn-huvel ny a'th pys a gidya'agan salowen dh'agan porthys. Benyga'gan porthys may I martesen salow dh'agan dehweles. Res agan gorholyon bos pals ha 'gan porthys soweni. Re'th gras. Amen

=== English ===
The Southcott Family Prayer
ALMIGHTY Father, watch over us, by land and by sea. We humbly beseech thee to guide us safely to our harbours. Bless our harbours; so that they may be safe for our return. May our ships be plentiful and our harbours prosper. By your grace. Amen

== Bibliography ==
- Sir Thomas Clifford Bart (1817) A Topographical and Historical Description of the Parish of Tixall
- Sir Sindey Lee (1898) Dictionary of National Biography, Volume LIII. London: Smith, Elder & Co.
- Samuel Lysons (1763-1819) Magna Britannia: Being a Concise Topographical Account of the Several Counties of Great Britain, Volume III
- Samuel Lysons (1763-1819) Magna Britannia: Being a Concise Topographical Account of the Several Counties of Great Britain, Volume IV
- John Morris (1872) The Troubles of Our Catholic Forefathers Related by Themselves
- Sir William Pole (1742) Collections Towards a Description of the Country of Devon
- Rev Gordon Ruming (2005) Calstock Parish Church History
- Sir Henry Saint-George (1620) The Visitation of the County of Devon in the Year 1620
- Lt Col J L. Vivian (1895) The Visitations of the County of Devon
- The Book of Fees (1242) Part II, published by the Public Record Office in 1920
- Harleian Society (1878) The Publications of the Harleian Society, Volume XIII
- Royal Institute of Cornwall (1867) Journal, Volume II. Truro
