= John Southcote =

John Southcote may refer to:

- Sir John Southcote (died 1585), English judge and politician
- John Southcote (died 1556), English politician and landowner
