= Southcote baronets =

Extinct baronetcy in the Baronetage of England

Southcote Baronetcy
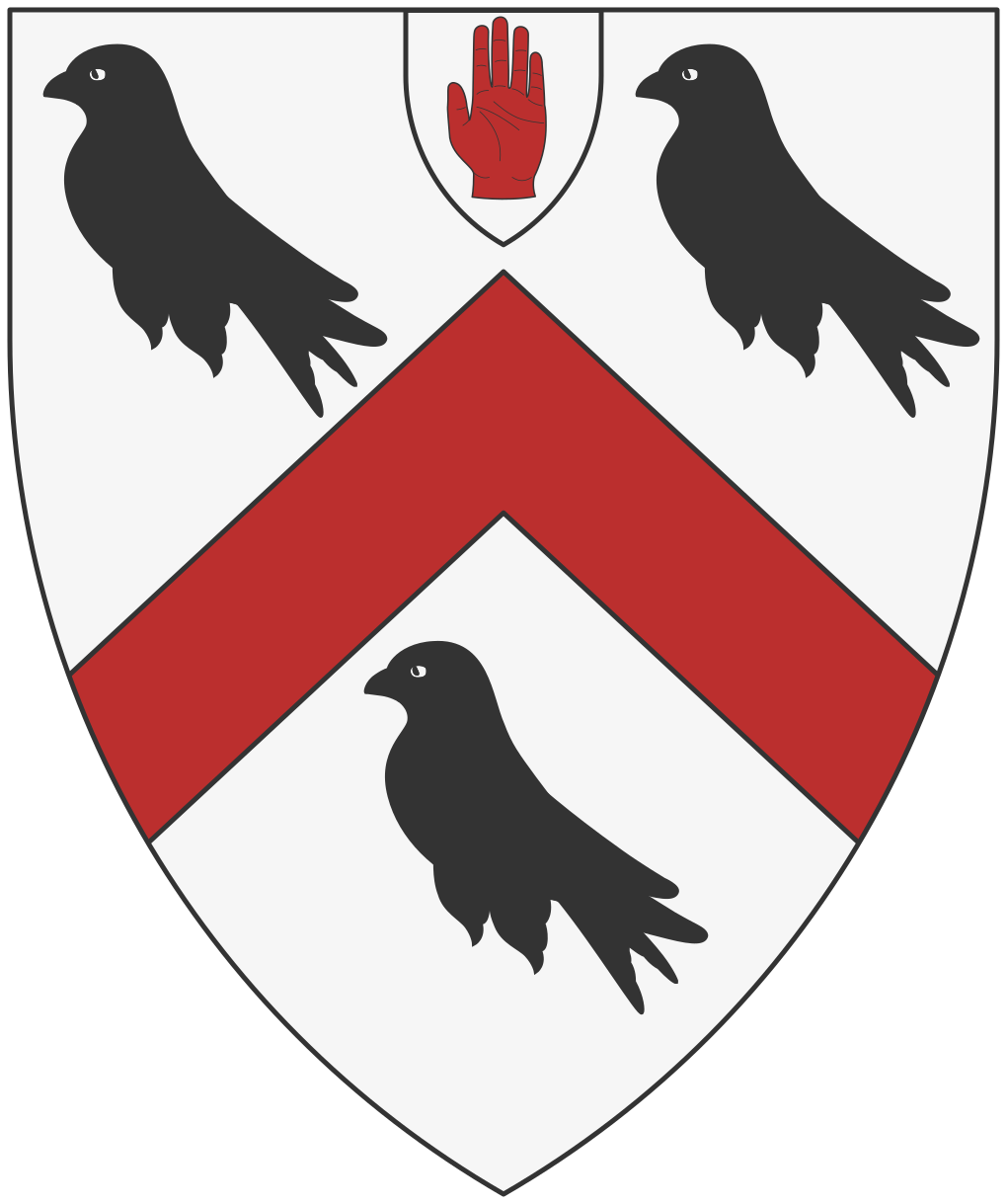
- Argent, a chrevron engrailed gules between three Coots, a canton of a baronet
- Creation date: 1661
- Created by: King Charles II
- Baronetage: Baronetage of England
- Status: 687th in England
- Extinction date: 1691
- Former seat: Blyborough Hall Lincolnshire

The Southcote Baronetcy, of Bliborough in the County of Lincoln, was a title in the Baronetage of England. It was created on 24 December 1661 for George Southcote. The title became extinct upon the death of the second Baronet in 1691.

== Origins ==
Capt. Thomas Southcot (1608-1657) was an officer of the Cavalier Army during the First English Civil War, the early part of the English Civil War. In 1644 he was the garrison commander of the Cavalier army based at Calstock and Cotehele. He defended Cornwall from Robert Devereux, 3rd Earl of Essex and his Parliamentarian forces.

Thomas Southcot died in 1657, never witnessing the restoration of the monarchy in 1661. King Charles II did recognise Thomas's tremendous loyalty by awarding his only son George Southcote (1629-1663) with the title of Baronet of Bliborough.

Capt. Thomas Southcot's father was Sir George Southcote MP (1572-1638), he was a very wealthy landowner having four estates. At his death he divided his four estates between his three sons. Firstly his eldest son, George Southcote received the estate of Stoke Fleming and Blyborough. His Second Son Capt. Thomas Southcot received only the estate of Withycombe. His third son, Robert Southcote, received the estate in Shillingford. Upon George Southcote's death his left his entire estate to his only son Thomas Southcote MP DL JP. However Thomas Southcote had only one daughter Lady Elizabeth Portman. In the year leading up to his death he gave both of his estates to his cousin George Southcote (1629-1663). This is George Southcote inherited his estate in Blyborough and how he later became Baronet of Bliborough.

== Southcote baronets, of Blyborough (1662) ==
- Sir George Southcote, 1st Baronet (1629–1663)
- Sir George Southcote, 2nd Baronet (1664–1689)

The first Baronet married Catherine Eliot, daughter of John Elliot Esq of Essex, becoming the first baronetess. They had one son named George, he was born four months after his father's death. The second Baronet died without any sons, he left two infant daughters, afterwards married to Smith and Fitzherbert.

== Family Tree ==
Southcote baronets

Sir George Southcott MP of Blyborough, Shillingford, Stoke Fleming and Withycombe (1572-1638)
Robert Southcote of Shillingford	George Southcote of Stoke Fleming and Blyborough	Capt. Thomas Southcott of Withycombe (1608-1657)	Judith	Mary	Rebecca
Thomas Southcote; MP DL JP of Stoke Fleming and Blyborough (c1622-1664)	Sir George Southcote Bt; 1st Baronet of Bliborough; Created 1662 (1629-1663)	Lady Catherine Southcote (Née Eliot)
Sir William Portman; Bt KB MP FRS; 6th Baronet of Orchard Portman (1664-1690)	Lady Elizabeth Portman	Sir George Southcote Bt; 2nd Baronet of Bliborough (1664-1698)	Lady Mary Southcote (Née Smythe)	Katherine Palmer
Katherine Smith	Constantine Fitzherbert

== Claim ==
The title of Baronet of Southcote was claimed after Sir George's deaths in 1689. Claimed by the eldest son of Michael Southcote. However he died without issue, his youngers brother Henry and Phillip are supposed to be the only male descendants of the family. It is unknown if they continued to claim the title.

Baronetage of England
Preceded by Wyndham baronets, of Orchard Wyndham	Southcote baronets of Bliborough; 24 December 1661	Succeeded by Trevelyan baronets, of Nettlecombe
