= Benton, Devon =

Village in Devon, England

Coordinates: 51.11°N 03.92°W

Benton
- Location within Devon
- OS grid reference: SS6536
- Civil parish: Bratton Fleming
- District: North Devon
- Shire county: Devon
- Region: South West
- Country: England
- Sovereign state: United Kingdom
- Police: Devon and Cornwall
- Fire: Devon and Somerset
- Ambulance: South Western

Benton is a village in Devon, England, within the civil parish of Bratton Fleming.
