= John Southcote (died 1556) =

English politician

John Southcote of Bovey Tracey (1481–1556) was an English landowner and Member of Parliament, of the prominent Southcott family of Devon and Cornwall.

John was born the second son of Sir Nicholas Southcott of Southcott, Devon. During his lifetime he served as Clerk of the Peace for Devon.

In 1544, following the dissolution of the monasteries, Indio and Ullacombe, both in the parish of Bovey Tracey, were granted to John. This was likely owing to his powerful connections within the Catholic faith at that time.

John Southcote and the rest of his family were devout Catholics at the time when Edward VI, newly King of England, attempted to make religious reforms in Cornwall. John as a prominent Cornish MP stood up against the King and was part of the Prayer Book Rebellion in 1549. He disagreed with the removal of the Cornish Language and the English Reformation. After the rebellion was crushed by Edward Seymour, 1st Duke of Somerset's army, Southcote was not hanged, and after some years he was named in a general pardon granted by King Edward VI. During the years following the uprising, John Southcote's nephew (also named John Southcott) was noted for expressing his support for his uncle's part in the uprising, and later resigned his office rather than condemn a Roman Catholic priest publicly.

In the following election he was not re-elected to represent Lostwithiel in parliament, but in two later parliaments (November 1554 and in 1555) he was returned for Lostwithiel again, by which time England lay under the rule of a Roman Catholic queen, Mary.

== Coat of arms ==
Coat of arms of John Southcote (Bachelor)
Adopted 1481–1526 Escutcheon 1st and 3rd: Argent, a chevron engrailed gules between three coots sable (Southcott Arms). 2nd and 4th: Argent, a fess sable with three mullets argent between three martlets sable (Pury Arms).
