= Bratton Fleming =

Village in Devon, England

Coordinates: 51.122°N 3.940°W

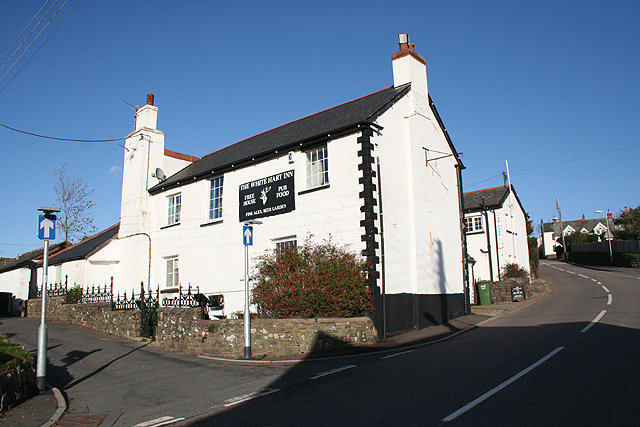
- The White Hart Inn, Bratton Fleming

- Location within Devon
- Population: 928
- OS grid reference: SS6437
- District: North Devon
- Shire county: Devon
- Region: South West
- Country: England
- Sovereign state: United Kingdom
- Post town: Barnstaple
- Postcode district: EX31
- Police: Devon and Cornwall
- Fire: Devon and Somerset
- Ambulance: South Western
- UK Parliament: North Devon
- Website: Parish Council

Bratton Fleming is a large village, civil parish and former manor in Devon, England, about 6 miles (10 km) north-east of Barnstaple and near the western edge of Exmoor. The parish includes the hamlets of Knightacott and Stowford. The population of the parish in 2001 was 942, falling to 928 in 2011. There is an electoral ward with the same name which at the 2011 census had a population of 2,117.

== History ==
The former manor of Bratton Fleming was owned by a succession of families from the Norman Conquest to the 19th century. The Flemings had their seat at Chimwell which Tristram Risdon described as "one of the largest demesnes of this shire". According to W. G. Hoskins, Chimwell is now a farmhouse called Chumhill. Other Domesday manors in the parish were Benton and Haxton. The great jurist Henry de Bracton (c. 1210 – c. 1268) was either born here or at Bratton Clovelly.

The village was once served by a railway station, supposedly 'the most beautiful in England', on the narrow gauge Lynton & Barnstaple Railway; the trackbed runs close to the village. The street names Station Road and Station Hill survive.

== Church ==
St Peter's Church was rebuilt on the site of a much older building in 1861; parts of the north chancel chapel are from the 14th century.

Rev. Gascoigne Canham (d. 1667), Rector of Arlington, whose mural monument exists in Arlington Church, and a relative by marriage to the Chichester family of Arlington (a cadet branch of the Chichesters of Raleigh and later of Youlston, lords of the manor of Bratton Fleming), purchased in 1665 the advowson of Bratton Fleming, 2 1/2 miles south-east of Arlington, from Sir Francis Godolphin for £300, and on 27 March 1667 he signed a deed granting the advowson in perpetuity to Gonville and Caius College, Cambridge, of which he was a member. He also gave £10 toward the Combination Room of that college. A mural monument exists in St Peter's Church, Bratton Fleming, to Rev. Bartholomew Wortley, the first rector to be appointed by Gonville & Caius. He was aged about 50 when appointed and remained in office until his death in 1749 aged 97.

A glebe terrier of Bratton Fleming, 1679, is quoted at length in W.G. Hoskins' book Field Work in Local History and used as an example of how useful glebe terriers are in researching parish history in general.

Since 2004, the church building has been shared between the Church of England and the Methodists. The parish is part of the CofE's Shirwell Mission Community (a group of eight churches), and is also part of the Ilfracombe and Barnstaple Methodist circuit.

== See also ==
- Baron Slane
- Henry de Bracton
- Exmoor Steam Railway
