= Manor of Bratton Fleming =

The Manor of Bratton Fleming was a medieval manor estate in Bratton Fleming, Devon, England.

== Descent of the manor ==
=== Fleming ===
In the Domesday Book of 1086 the manor of "Brotone" (Bratton) was one of over one hundred west country manors held in chief by Robert, Count of Mortain, who was the half-brother of William the Conqueror. Robert's tenant at Bratton was Erchenbald "the Fleming" from whom, or from a descendent, Bratton Fleming was named.

Erchenbald was succeeded by his son, Stephen (fl. 1145), whose son, Archembald, went to Ireland with Henry II in 1171 and participated in Hugh de Lacy's plantation of the Kingdom of Mide. Succeeding Flemings were Stephen, died c. 1213 – 1214 and Baldwin, died 1260. Baldwin's son, Richard, married Mary/Maria Martin, daughter of Sir Nicholas FitzMartin the Younger (died 1260), jure uxoris feudal baron of Barnstaple. Richard died in 1301. Their son, Baldwin (died 1335), married Matilda/Maude de Genville, daughter of Sir Simon de Genville of Trim. Baldwin was summoned to parliament at Kilkenny in 1309 and was thereby deemed to have become the 1st Baron Slane (or Baron le Fleming). They were the parents of Simon Fleming, 2nd Baron Slane. On the death unmarried and childless of Christopher Fleming, 5th Baron Slane in 1457, his two sisters became his co-heirs to his Devon estates: Amy Fleming married John Bellewe and Anne Fleming married Walter Dillon. The Fleming lands in Devon were split between the husbands of both sisters and the Dillons acquired Bratton Fleming.

=== Dillon ===
The Dillon family (or de Leon, de Lune, etc.) was a cadet branch of the ancient Breton house of de Leon, a member of which accompanied Prince John (later King John) to Ireland in 1185 and was granted extensive lands in Counties Longford and Westmeath called 'Dillon's Country'. The title Viscount Dillon was created in 1622 for Theobald Dillon, Lord President of Connaught. The Dillons of Bratton Fleming (and of Wroughton and Hart, in Heanton Punchardon) were a cadet branch of this Irish family and were seated at Chymwell (Chumhill). The descent was as follows:

- Walter Dillon, who married Anne Fleming, co-heiress of Bratton Fleming.
- Nicholas Dillon of Bratton Fleming
- Robert Dillon of Bratton Fleming, married Elizabeth (or Isabel) Fortescue, daughter of either Henry Fortescue of Ermington or William Fortescue of Prudonstone. His 5th son was Anthony Dillon (died 1615), MP for Penryn in 1589.
- Henry Dillon (died 1579), eldest son, married Elizabeth Pollard, daughter of Sir Hugh Pollard.
- Robert Dillon, eldest son and heir. He was bequeathed by his father "the warren called the Borough alias Braunton Borough" (Braunton Burrows) and brought a claim against the mayor and aldermen of Barnstaple for unlawful imprisonment. He was an overseer of the will of his uncle Anthony Dillon (died 1615), MP. He married Grace Chichester, a daughter of Sir John Chichester (died 1569) of Raleigh. The heraldic impalement representing this marriage is visible on the monument of her father in Pilton Church. In 1599 he sold all the Dillon lands in North Devon, including Bratton Fleming, to his wife's nephew, Sir Robert Chichester (1578–1627) of Raleigh. In about the middle of the seventeenth century this branch of the Dillons was seated in Farthingoe, Northamptonshire.

=== Chichester ===
Arms of Chichester: Chequy or and gules, a chief vair, the inverse of the arms of Fleming. These were originally the arms of de Raleigh of Raleigh, Pilton, ancient neighbours of the Fleming family in North Devon

In 1599 Robert Chichester (1578–1627) of Raleigh purchased from his aunt's husband, Robert Dillon Esq., of Chumhill for £9,900 the manors of "Bratton Flemyng, Benton, and Haxton, the capital mansion, barton and demesnes of Chumhill, Haxton, Chelfham, and Shirrledon and all the lands called Chumhill, Benton, Haxton, Chelfham, and Shirrldon, in the parishes of Bratton Flemyng, Loxhore, Stoke Rivers, and Kentisbury, and £5 of rent (called Flemyng's rent) out of lands in South Molton and elsewhere in Devon". In the 1810 edition of Risdon's "Survey of Devon" the manor of Bratton Fleming was still held by the family in the person of his descendant Sir Arthur Chichester, 7th Baronet (1790–1842), who was then also lord of the manors of Shirwell, Stoke Rivers and Brendon, among many others.

=== Fanshawe ===
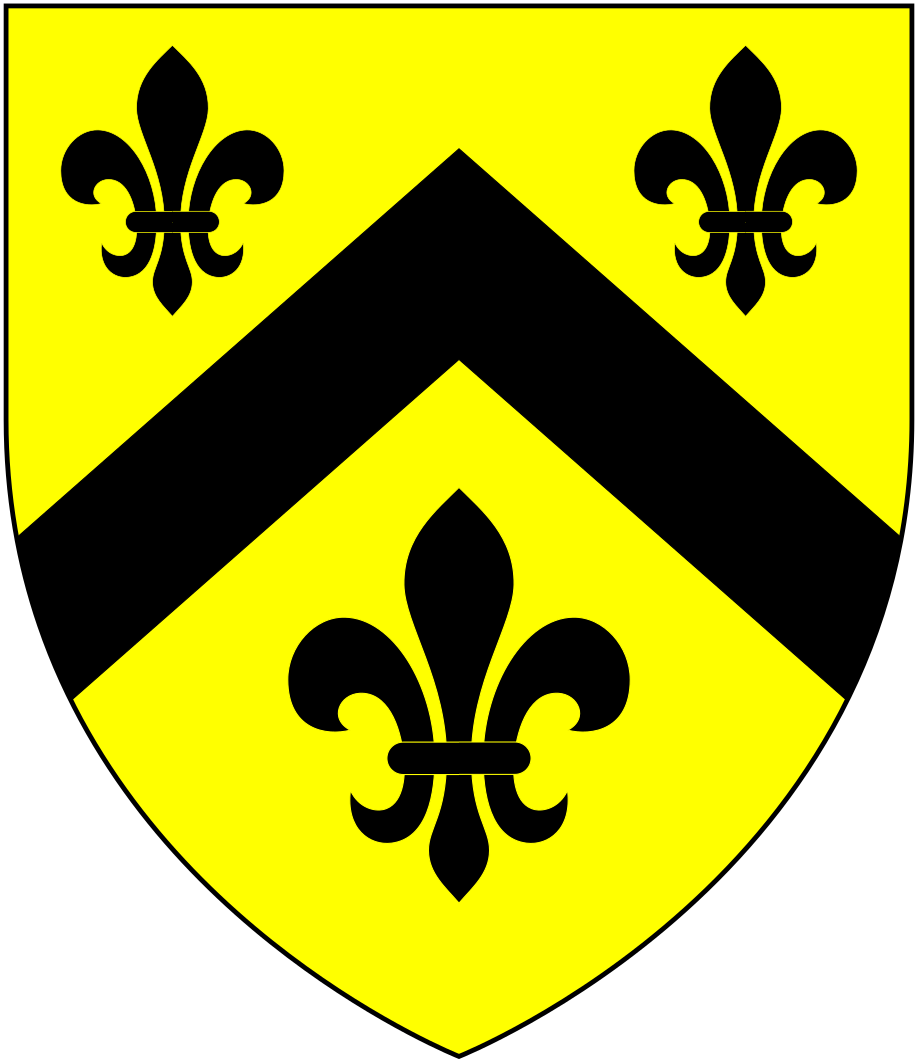
Arms of Fanshawe of Bratton Fleming and of Fanshawe Gate, Derbyshire, granted in 1490 to John Fanshawe of Fanshawe Gate: Or, a chevron between three fleurs-de-lys sable

The present house known as "Chumhill", situated 1 1/4 miles south-west of Bratton Fleming Church, was built circa 1920 on the site of the former manor house, of which no visible remains survive. In 1937 the lord of the manor of Bratton Fleming was Basil Thomas Fanshawe (born 1857) of Fanshawe Gate in Derbyshire and of Smallcombe in the parish of Exford in Somerset. He served as a captain in the North Devon Imperial Yeomanry and as a magistrate for Ceylon. In 1890 he married Mary Georgina Clerke, only daughter of Sir William Henry Clerke, 10th Baronet (1822–1882) of Hitcham, Buckinghamshire. He was the second son of John Gaspard Fanshawe (1824-1903) of Parsloes in Essex, which estate had been purchased in 1619 by his ancestor William Fanshawe of Great Singleton in Lancashire and of Norton Dawnley in Devon, Auditor of the Duchy of Lancaster, by his wife Barbara Coventry a grand-daughter of George Coventry, 7th Earl of Coventry (1758–1831). In 1923 Basil Fanshawe redeemed the mortgage on his ancestral estate of Fanshawe Gate, held by the senior line of his family since the 15th century, which in 1832 had been mortgaged for 500 years by its then owner Rev. C.R. Fanshawe, of whom his ancestors were distant cousins.
