= Southcott (surname) =

Southcott is a surname. Notable people with the surname include:

- Andrew Southcott (born 1967), Australian politician
- Ernest Southcott (1915–1976), Anglican priest
- Heather Southcott (1928–2014), Australian politician
- James Henry Southcott (1857–1913), Australian founder of Southcott Limited
- Joanna Southcott (1750–1814), English self-described religious prophetess
- Mary Southcott (1862–1943), Newfoundland nurse and hospital administrator
- Ronald Vernon Southcott (1918–1998), Australian medical zoologist
