= Southcott, Winkleigh =

Southcott
- Hamlet
- Location within Devon
- Civil parish: Winkleigh
- District: Torridge
- Ceremonial county: Devon
- Region: South West
- Country: England
- Sovereign state: United Kingdom
- Post town: Winkleigh

Southcott, formerly also Southcote, is a hamlet north of Dartmoor in the parish of Winkleigh in the district of Torridge, Devon, England.

Historically the hamlet began as a manor house and farm houses, the ancient and former seat of the Southcott family.
