= Thomas Southcote =

English landowner and politician

Thomas Southcote MP DL JP of Buckland (c. 1622 – 1664) was an English landowner and politician who sat in the House of Commons from 1661 to 1664.

Southcote was the son of George Southcote of Buckland Tout Saints and his wife Frances. He matriculated at Balliol College, Oxford on 2 November 1638, aged 16. He was a student of Lincoln's Inn in 1640. In 1654 he succeeded to the estates of his father. In 1657, he became a J.P. for Devon until his death and a commissioner for assessment for Devon for the year, being commissioner for assessment again from August 1660 until his death. In 1661, he was elected Member of Parliament for Dartmouth in the Cavalier Parliament. He was Deputy Lieutenant from 1661 to his death and commissioner for corporations from 1662 to 1663.

Southcote who was sickly for a long period died at the age of about 42 between 28 March 1664 and 6 April 1664.

Southcote married Alice Petre, daughter of Abraham Petre of Marldon, Devon under a marriage settlement of 15 January 1650. They had two sons and three daughters. His sons died in infancy and his only surviving daughter married Sir William Portman, 6th Baronet.

Parliament of England
Preceded by John Frederick; John Hale	Member of Parliament for Dartmouth; 1661–1664; With: William Harbord	Succeeded by William Harbord; Thomas Kendall
