= Thomas Southcote (died 1600) =

English politician

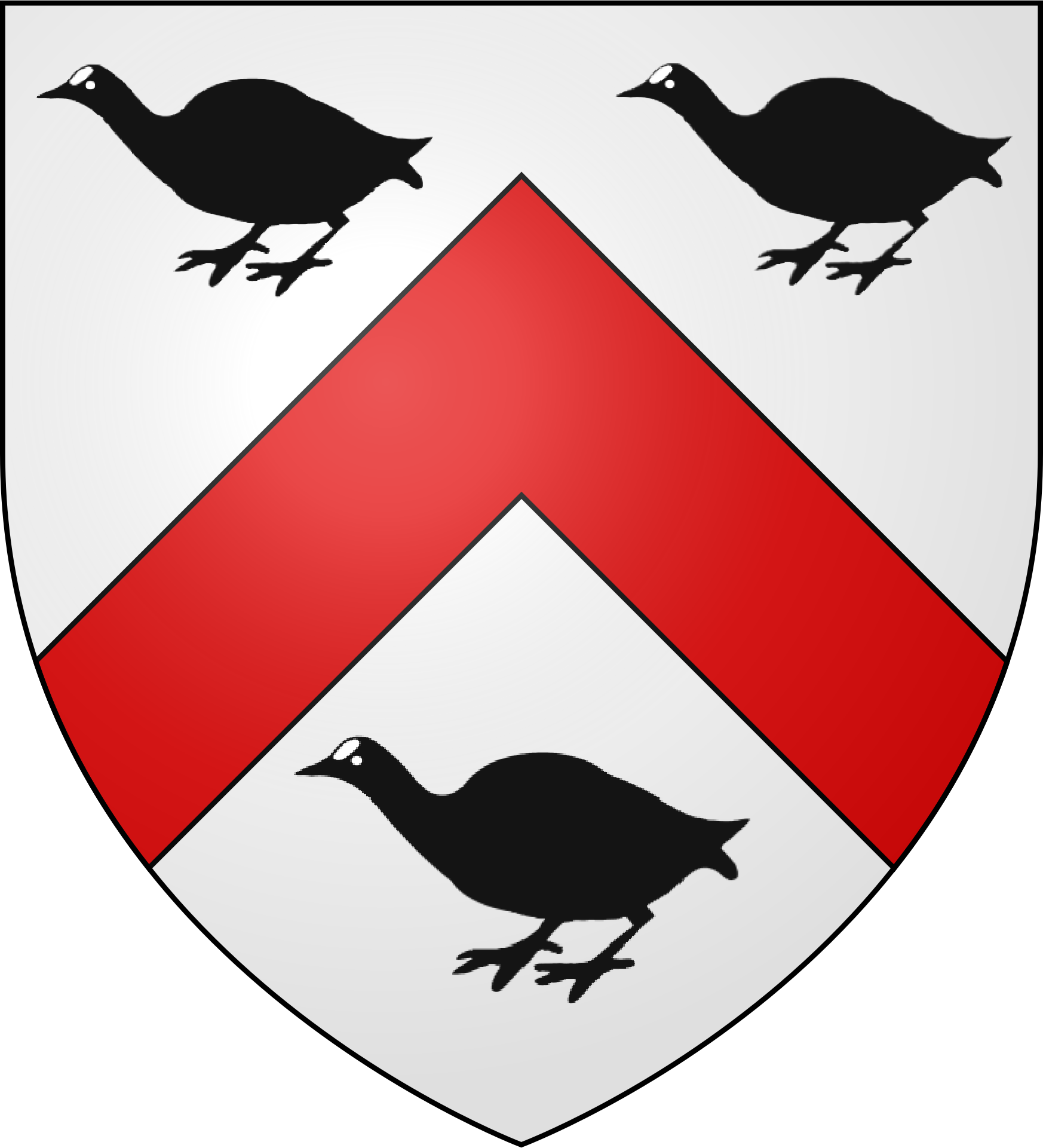
Arms of the Southcott family

Thomas Southcote (by 1528 – 10 August 1600) was an English politician.

He was the eldest son of John Southcote of Bovey Tracey, who he succeeded in 1556.

Southcote was elected a Member of the Parliament of England for Tavistock in 1555, for Plympton Erle in 1558 and for Dartmouth in 1559. He was appointed High Sheriff of Devon for 1558–59 and 1570–71.

He married three times:firstly Grace, the daughter and heiress of John Barnhouse of Devon, with whom he had a son and two daughters and secondly Susan, the daughter of Thomas Kirkham of Blagdon in Paignton, with whom he had another four sons and six daughters and thirdly Elizabeth, the daughter of George Fitzwilliam of Mablethorpe, Lincolnshire who gave him a further eight sons and four daughters.
