= George Southcote (1572–1638) =

English politician

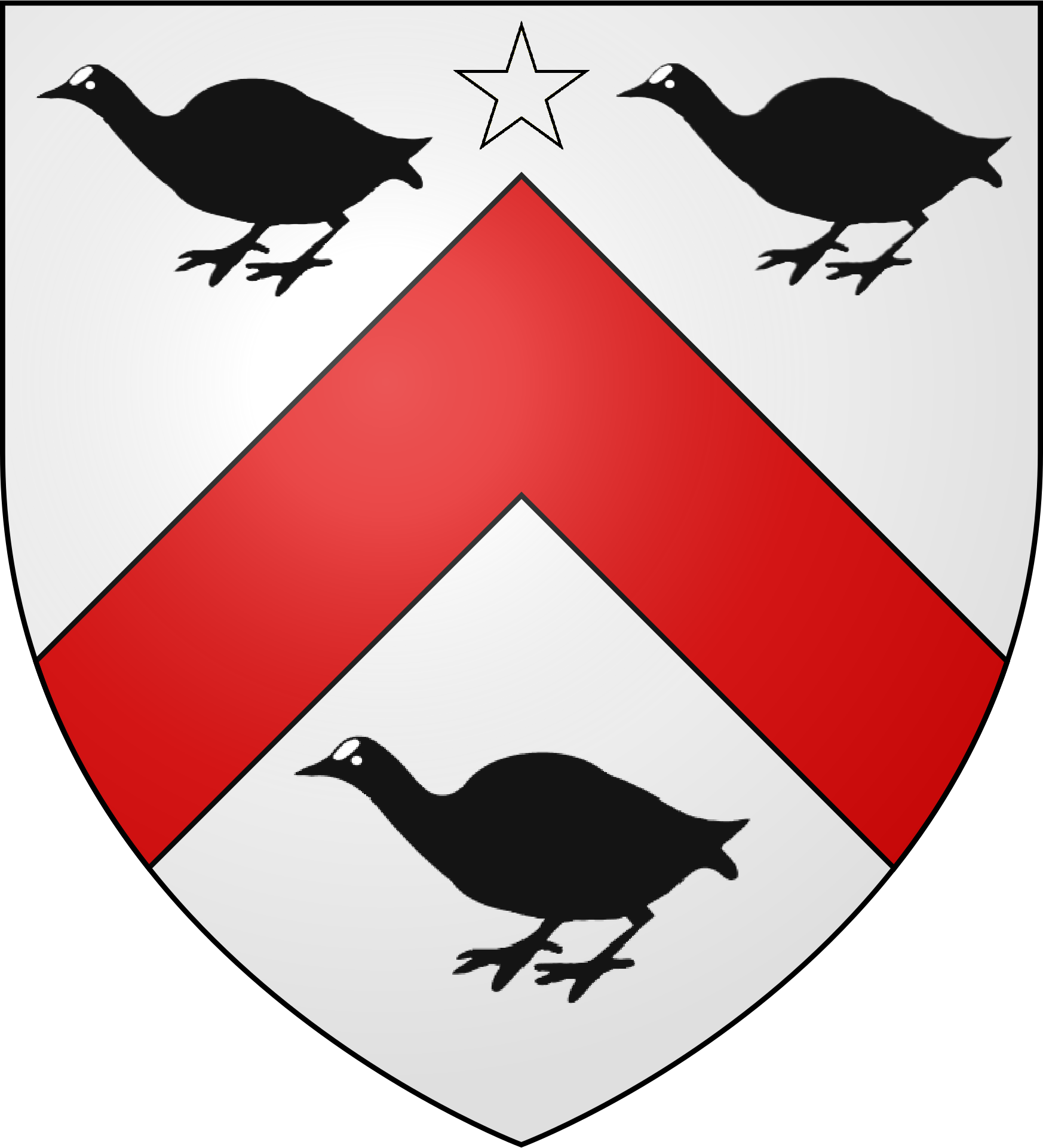
Arms of the Southcote family of Shillingford. Argent, a chevron gules, between three coots sable, a mullet for difference.

George Southcote (1572–1638), of Shillingford, Devon, was an English politician.

He was a member (MP) of the parliament of England for Plympton Erle in 1597.
