= Gawain Carew =

English politician (c. 1508 – 1584)

Sir Gawain Carew JP DL
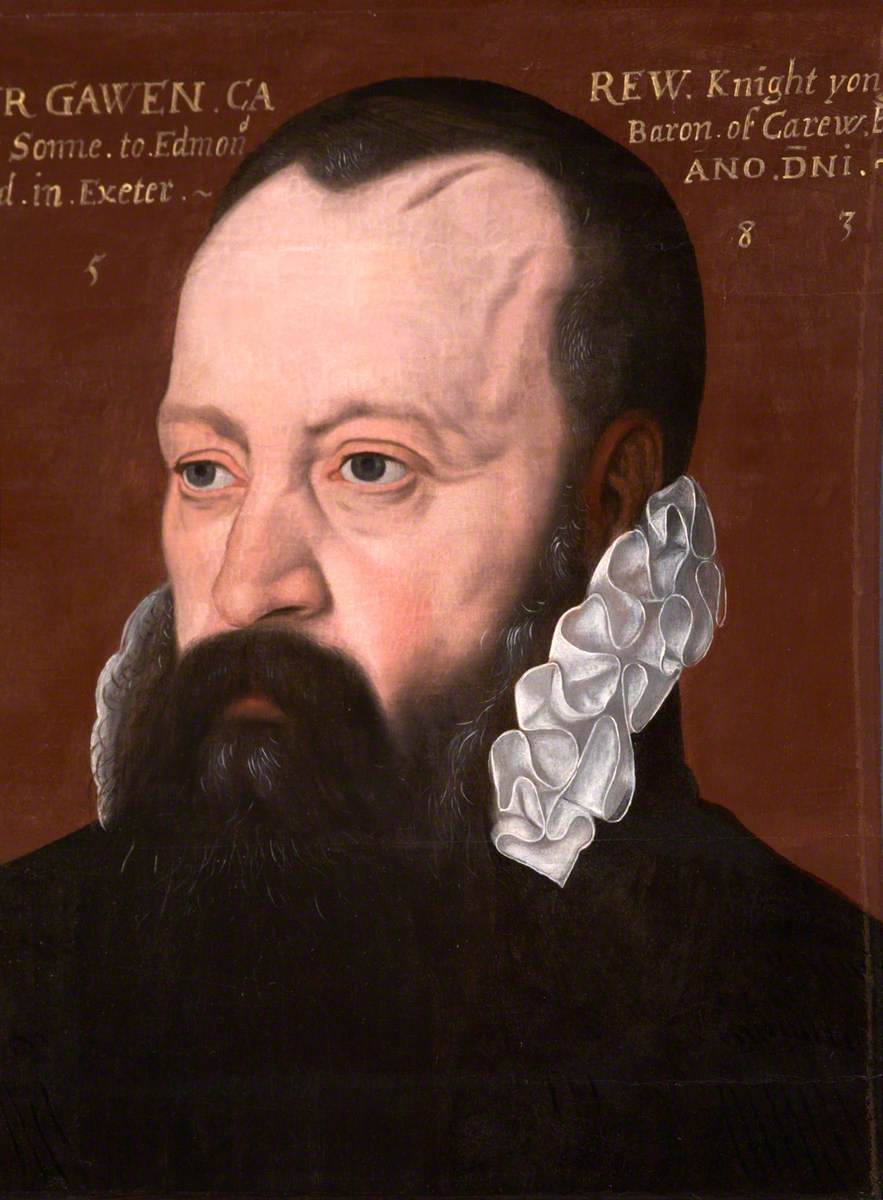
- Portrait c.1565

Member of Parliament for Devon
- In office 11 January 1563 – 2 January 1567
- Preceded by: John St. Leger
- Succeeded by: Peter Edgcumbe
- In office 16 January 1542 – 15 April 1552
- Preceded by: Richard Pollard
- Succeeded by: Peter Carew

Member of Parliament for Plympton Erle
- In office 23 January 1559 – 8 May 1559
- Preceded by: Thomas Southcote
- Succeeded by: Nicholas Ogle

Personal details
- Born: c.1508
- Died: 25 March 1584 (aged 76)
- Resting place: Exeter Cathedral
- Spouse(s): Anne Brandon; Mary Wotton; Elizabeth Norwich
- Relatives: William Huddesfield (grandfather); George Carew (brother); Peter Carew (nephew); George Carew (nephew); Peter Carew (nephew); George Carew (nephew)
- Occupation: Politician

Sir Gawain Carew (Note: His forename is generally spelled either Gawain or Gawen in modern sources. He usually abbreviated it to "Ga." in his signature, but is known to have signed himself "Gawyn" on at least one occasion.) JP DL (c. 1508 – 25 March 1584) was an English politician. He was Member of Parliament (MP) for Devon and for Plympton Erle.

== Early life and ancestry ==
Gawain Carew was born in c. 1508, the fourth son of Sir Edmund Carew and Katherine Huddesfield. His maternal grandfather, William Huddesfield, was an English statesman who served as the Attorney General for England and Wales under Edward IV and Henry VII.

Gawain Carew's father made special provisions for Gawain and his brother George in his will before his death in 1513. They were placed in the custody of the elder brother Nicholas who appeared to have attached them to the household of Henry Courtenay, Marquess of Exeter, where they received a livery of cloth as household members in 1525. Their father also provided for their maintenance, and left them £200 to be paid at their marriage.

== Later life and career ==
Despite being widely connected in Devon, Carew's early career centred around court and the capital. In October 1532, Carew's brother-in-law, Charles Brandon, recommended him to be the sheriff of Devon to Thomas Cromwell; but he did not hold the office for another 15 years. In April 1538, he was imprisoned in the Compter after he and his servant had killed an adversary and seriously wounded another, but by January 1540 he was sufficiently in favour enough that he was appointed to receive Anne of Cleves at Blackheath.

Following the outbreak of war with France in 1543, Carew was ordered to accompany Thomas Howard, 3rd Duke of Norfolk, to the Netherlands, and he brought with him four horsemen and four footmen. In 1544, he took part in the Boulogne campaign and in 1545 he captained the Matthew Gonson in naval engagements. He was knighted in 1545.

Carew testified against Queen Catherine Howard at her trial in 1542, and also testified against Henry Howard, Earl of Surrey in January 1547.

He was an ardent Protestant. Alongside his nephew, Sir Peter Carew the elder, he was involved in 1549 in the harsh suppression of the Prayer Book Rebellion, the rising in Devon and Cornwall occasioned by the issue of the reformed Book of Common Prayer. Again with Sir Peter, he participated in 1553–54 in Wyatt's Rebellion, in opposition to Queen Mary I's marriage to Philip II of Spain. For his involvement in the latter affair, he was imprisoned on charges of treason, for a month at Exeter and for ten months in the Tower of London, but was eventually pardoned. (Sir Peter, meanwhile, had managed to escape into continental exile.)

On the accession of Elizabeth I in 1558, Carew was appointed Master of the Queen's Henchmen, in which role he participated in her coronation entry procession. He served as Sheriff of Devon from 1547 to 1548, and as Deputy Lieutenant of Cornwall and Devon in 1569. He was also the MP for Devon and for Plympton Erle. He was a justice of the peace for Devon from 1547 to 1553 and again from c. 1558 until his death.

== Personal life ==
Carew was married three times. His first marriage, in 1531, was to Anne née Brandon (d. before 1540), daughter of Sir William Brandon, sister of Charles Brandon, Duke of Suffolk, and widow of Sir John Shilston. His second marriage, by 1540, was to Mary née Wotton (d. 1558), widow of Sir Henry Guildford. His third marriage, by 1562, was to Elizabeth Norwich (d. 1594), a Lady of the Bedchamber to Elizabeth I. He had no children by any of his marriages.

== Death and commemoration ==
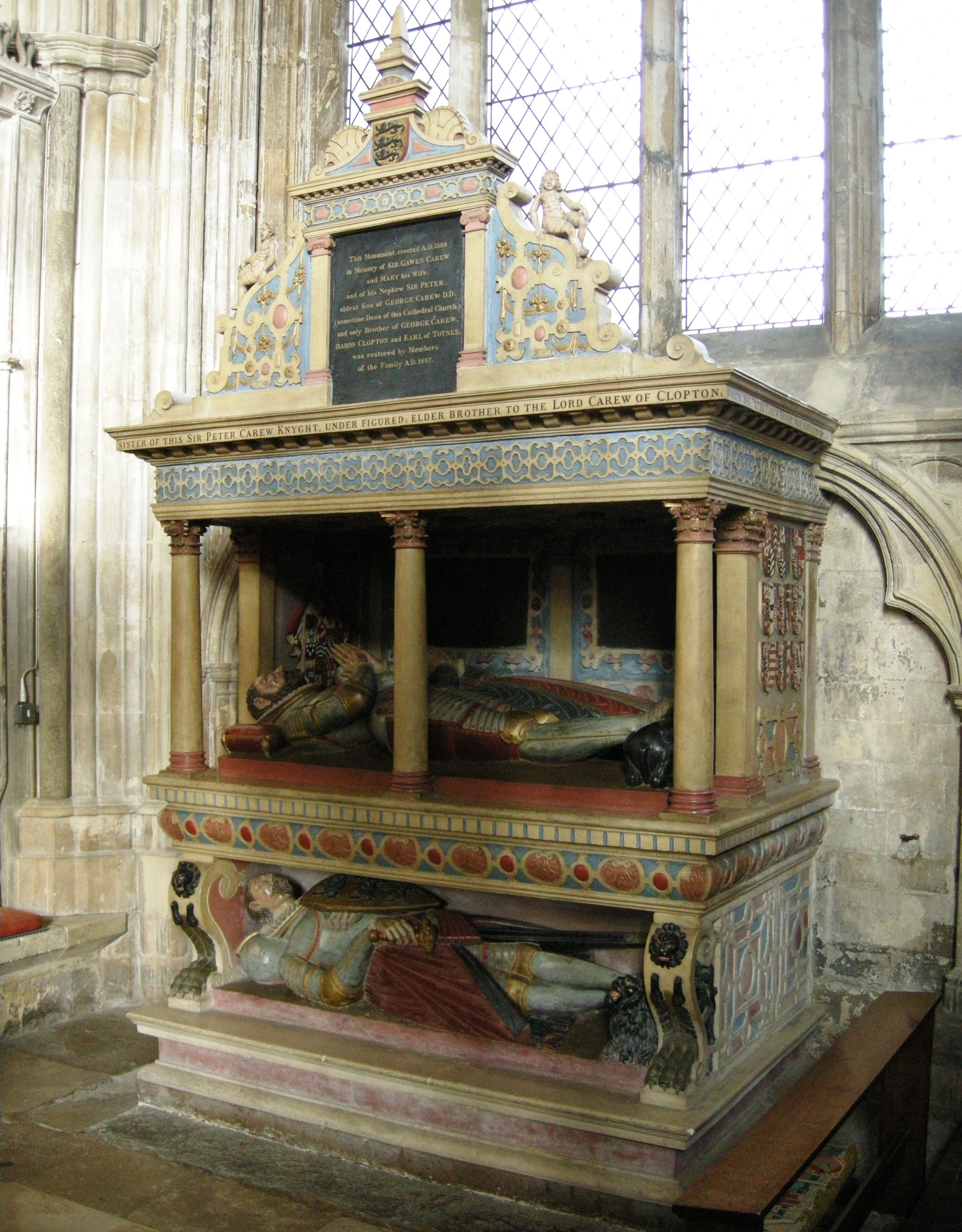
Tomb of Sir Gawain and Elizabeth Carew, Exeter Cathedral

Carew died aged 76 on 25 March 1584, probably at his home at Wood, in the parish of Kentisbeare, Devon. His last words were reported as "God blesse his church, confound Papistes, discover treacherie and treasons, blesse the commonwealth, and save the Queene." His heir was his nephew, George Carew, later Earl of Totnes.

In accordance with his wishes, Sir Gawain was buried in Exeter Cathedral. His widow, Elizabeth – probably advised by John Hooker, Chamberlain of Exeter – subsequently commissioned a grandiose two-tiered tomb monument in the Chapel of St John the Evangelist, completed in 1589. Elizabeth died in 1594, and was buried in the same tomb. The monument includes effigies of Sir Gawain and Elizabeth, although an inscription added during restoration work in 1857 mistakenly identifies the lady as Sir Gawain's second wife, Mary. The monument also commemorates another nephew, Sir Peter Carew the younger, who was killed in 1580 at the Battle of Glenmalure in Ireland: it is possible that his body, or some part of it, was returned to Exeter. A third effigy, occupying a recess at the base of the monument, shows an armoured knight in 14th-century style: it has long been thought that this represents Sir Peter, but it now appears far more likely that it depicts Adam Montgomery de Carew, the family's semi-legendary progenitor. The monument also displays much strapwork decoration and heraldry, including 27 shields containing 52 distinct coats of arms marshalled in a total of 359 impalements and quarterings, the whole forming "an elaborate shrine to Carew ancestry and kinship".
