= Peter Carew =

Peter Carew may refer to:

- Peter Carew (adventurer) (1514?–1575), English adventurer
- Peter Carew (soldier) (died 1580), English soldier

== See also ==
- Peter Cardew (1939–2020), British-Canadian architect
