= George Carew, 1st Earl of Totnes =

English politician (1555–1629)

The Right Honourable The Earl of Totness
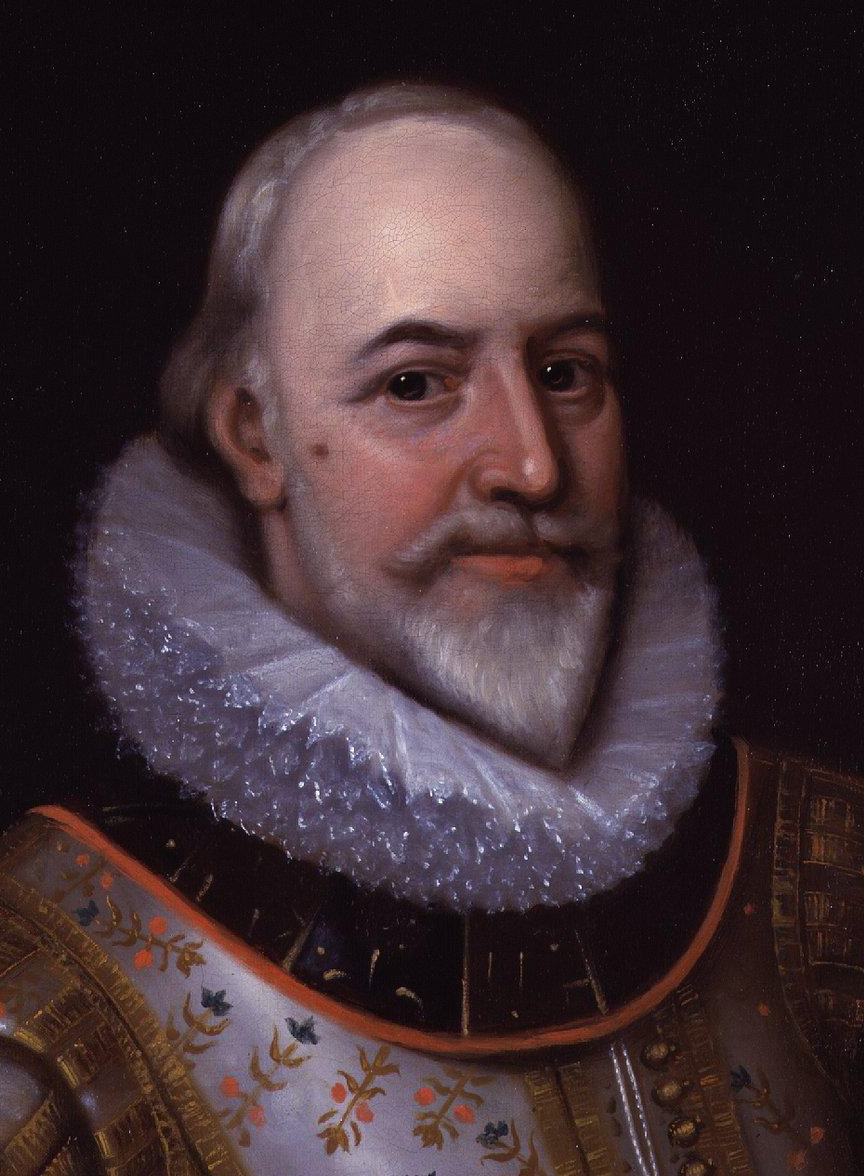
- Known for: Tudor conquest of Ireland
- Born: 29 May 1555; Devonshire, England
- Died: 27 March 1629 (aged 73); Savoy Palace, London, England

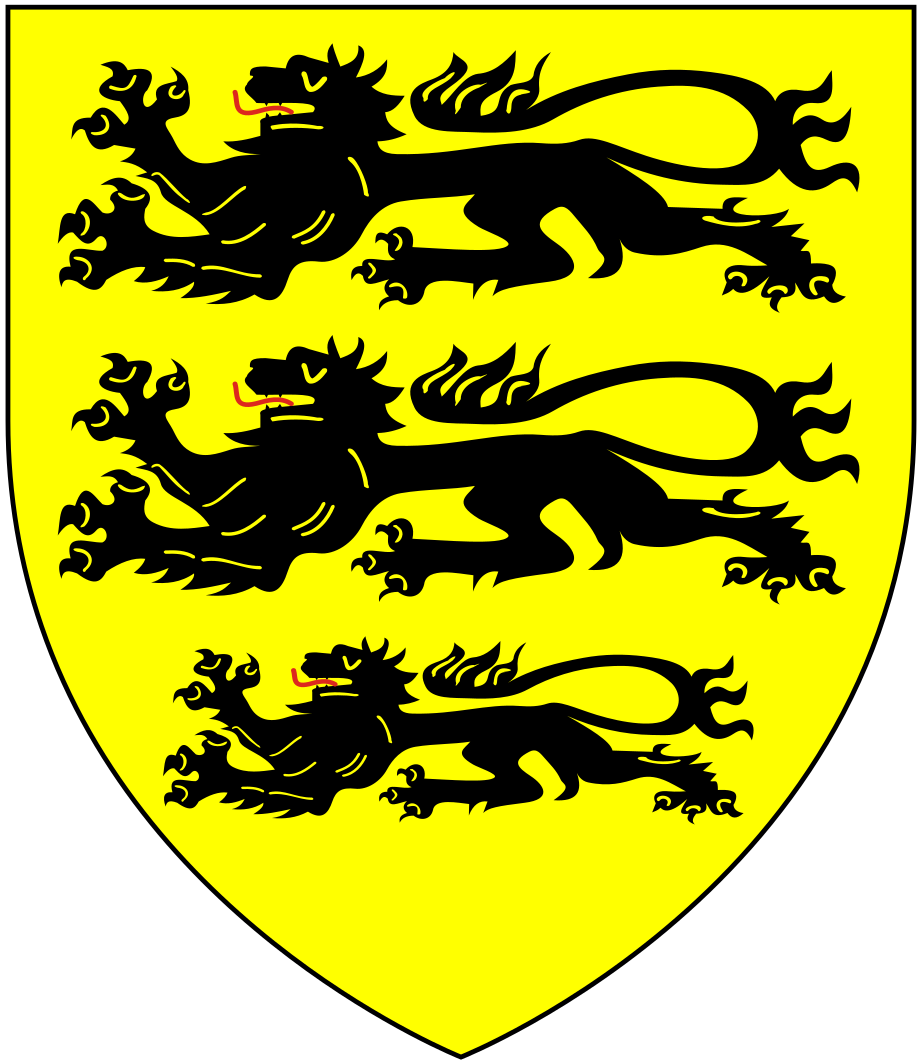
Arms of Carew: Or, three lions passant in pale sable These were the arms shown on the seal of "Nicholas de Carreu" (c. 1255 – 1311), appended to the Barons' Letter of 1301, which he joined as "Lord of Mulesford" and which were blazoned for the same bearer in the Caerlaverock Poem or Roll of Arms of 1300, when he was present at the Siege of Caerlaverock Castle. From him are descended the Carew baronets of Antony and of Haccombe, the Earl of Totnes and Baron Carew

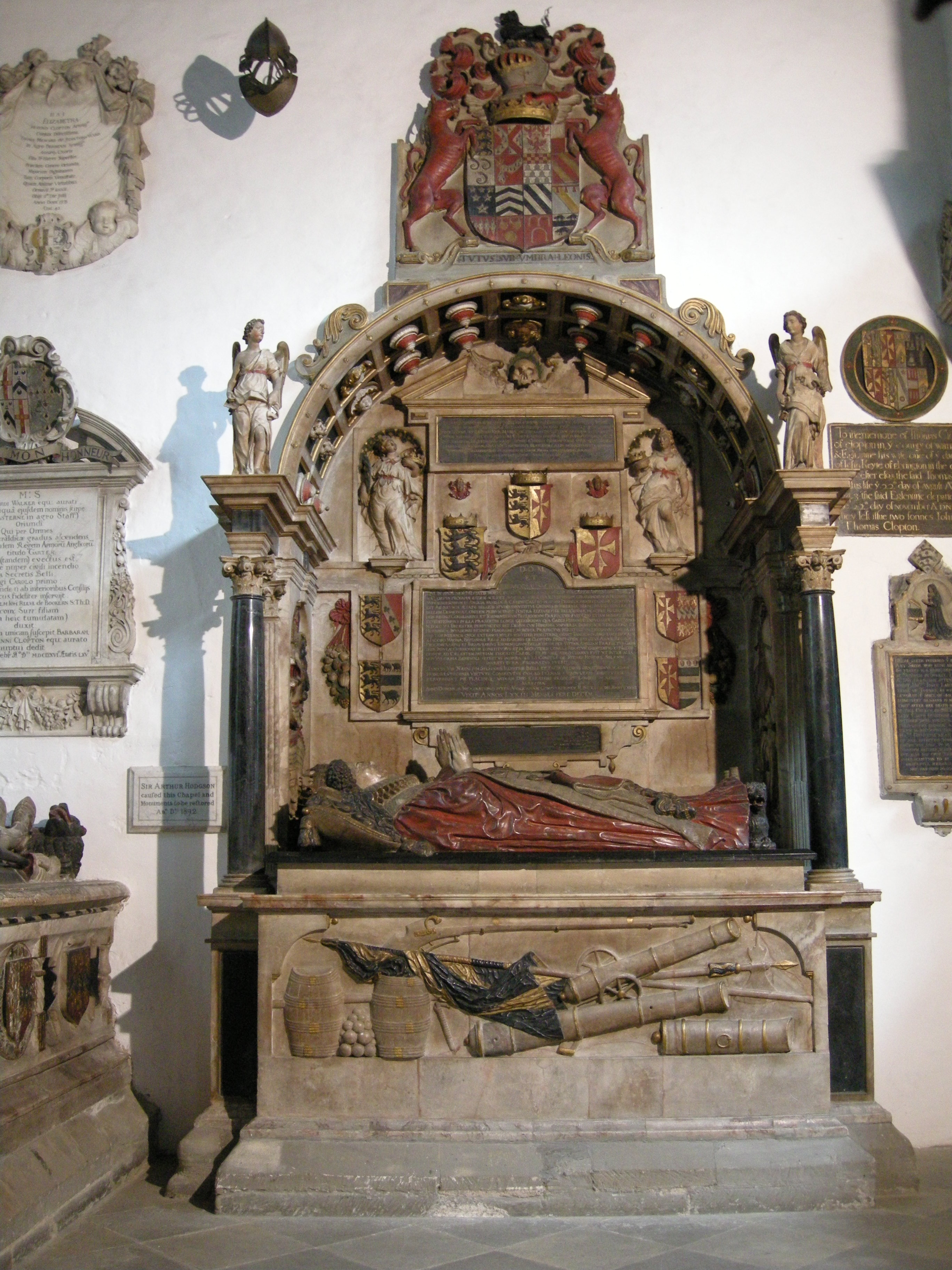
Monument to George Carew, Earl of Totnes (d. 1629), and his wife Joyce Clopton (d. 1637) in the Clopton Chantry Chapel in the Church of the Holy Trinity, Stratford-upon-Avon. His funeral helm hangs from the wall above left

George Carew, 1st Earl of Totnes (29 May 1555 – 27 March 1629), known as Sir George Carew between 1586 and 1605 and as The Lord Carew between 1605 and 1626, served under Elizabeth I during the Tudor conquest of Ireland and was appointed President of Munster. He was an authority on heraldry and the author of Carew's Scroll of Arms 1588, Collected from Churches in Devonshire etc., with Additions from Joseph Holland's Collection of Arms 1579.

== Origins ==
George Carew's paternal family were well known in Devonshire. His father was Dr. George Carew, Dean of Windsor. The dean was the third son of Sir Edmund Carew, Baron Carew, of Mohuns Ottery in the parish of Luppitt, Devon, and his wife Catharine Huddesfield. Catherine was co-heiress of her father Sir William Huddesfield of Shillingford St George in Devon, who was Attorney General for England and Wales to Kings Edward IV (1461–1483) and Henry VII (1485–1509).

George Carew's mother was Anne Harvey (d. 1605), daughter of Sir Nicholas Harvey. Carew succeeded his elder brother Sir Peter Carew (d. 1580), who was killed in Ireland in 1580, and inherited the family seat at Upton Hellions, near Crediton, Devon, which he later sold to a member of the Young family.

== Early career ==
He attended Broadgates Hall, Oxford, in the years 1564–1573 and was created Master of Arts in 1589. In 1574, Carew entered Crown service in Ireland under his cousin, the controversial Sir Peter Carew, and in the following year volunteered in the army of the lord deputy, Sir Henry Sidney. In 1576, he filled the post of captain of the garrison at Leighlin for a few months, during the absence of his brother, Peter, and was appointed lieutenant governor of county Carlow and vice-constable of Leighlin castle. In 1577, he was awarded a small pension for his courageous and successful attack on the rebel Rory Oge O'More, whose forces had been menacing the castle.

== Promotion ==
In 1578, Carew was made captain in the royal navy and undertook a voyage with Sir Humphrey Gilbert. In 1579–1580, he led a regiment of Irish infantry, then a regiment of cavalry, during the Second Desmond Rebellion. On the death of his brother in the Battle of Glenmalure, from which fight he had been kept by his uncle Jacques Wingfield, he was appointed constable of Leighlin castle. Soon afterwards, he killed with his own hands several Irishmen suspected of his brother's killing and was censured by the government.

Carew was much liked by the queen, and by her principal secretary, Sir William Cecil, and his son, the future secretary, Robert Cecil. In 1582 he was appointed gentleman pensioner to the queen, and in 1583 High Sheriff of Carlow. He received his knighthood in Christ Church Cathedral, Dublin, on 24 February 1586, at the hands of his friend, Sir John Perrot, the recently appointed lord deputy. In that same year he was at court, lobbying on government matters in Ireland. He declined the ambassadorship to France and returned to Ireland in 1588 to become master of the ordnance (a post he resigned on appointment as lieutenant-general of ordnance in England in 1592). He was present when the new lord deputy, William Fitzwilliam, dealt with the mutineers from Sir John Norris' regiments in Dublin and was appointed to the council on 25 August 1590.

In May 1596, Carew took part in the expedition to Cadiz with the Earl of Essex, in 1597 in the expedition to the Azores and in the same year during the 3rd Spanish Armada invasion attempt. Soon after he was elected Member of Parliament for Queenborough, In 1598 he went to France for a short time as ambassador to the court of King Henry IV in the company of secretary Cecil. He was appointed treasurer at war to Essex in Ireland in March 1599, and on the latter's sudden departure in September of the same year, leaving the island in disorder, Carew was appointed a lord justice.

== President of Munster ==
Carew was appointed President of Munster on 27 January 1600, at the height of the Nine Years War and landed with Lord Mountjoy at Howth Head a month later. He enjoyed wide powers, including the imposition of martial law, and excelled in the politics of divide and rule. He interviewed the successor to the Earl of Clancarty, Florence MacCarthy, in the spring of that year, after an unjust attack by presidency forces on the MacCarthy territories prior to his arrival. He was present as a guest when the Earl of Ormond was seized by the O'Mores at a parley in the same year, and managed to escape with the Earl of Thomond through a hail of daggers. At about this time he put down the supporters of the Súgán Earl of Desmond, and in October the lawful Desmond heir, James FitzGerald, was restored to the title in a limited degree. In August, Carew had accepted a reinforcement of 3,000 troops from England, but in the following May was dismayed when Mountjoy took 1,000 from him to supplement the crown army in its northern campaign, at a time when the threat of a Spanish landing in the south was at its highest.

Although he had been distrusted by Essex, owing to his sympathy with the Cecils—in 1598 Essex had encouraged his despatch to Ireland, in order to remove his influence from court—Carew's support was welcomed by Mountjoy (who had overtaken his own master, Essex). Cecil did seek his recall from the Irish service, as much for his own political ends, as out of friendship, and tried to manipulate Mountjoy into recommending this. But Carew remained on and, although he failed to intercept Hugh Roe O'Donnell on the rebel's remarkable march southward to relieve the Spanish forces which had made landfall at Kinsale in the winter of 1601, he did great service before and after the Battle of Kinsale, as he raided castles in the surrounding region in order to remove the advantage the Spanish had expected upon their landing. In the course of this campaign, his violence devastated the rebels and the peasantry, and his conduct of the siege of Dunboy castle, the last major engagement in Munster during the war, was ruthless. The Dursey massacre, also called the Dursey Island massacre, took place in June 1602 during the Nine Years' War on Dursey Island off the Beara Peninsula in southern Ireland. According to Philip O'Sullivan Beare, a group of around three hundred Gaelic Irish, including men, women and child civilians, were killed by English soldiers under George Carew. Many were killed during the attack, but those that surrendered were bound and thrown from the cliffs.

Carew proved unpopular with elements of the Old English élite in Ireland, particularly over his strong opposition to the privileges enjoyed by the municipal corporations under royal charter. On the death of Elizabeth I, he was confronted unexpectedly with serious civil disorder, when several towns under his jurisdiction refused to proclaim the new King James I. The motives for these disturbances are obscure, but probably combined a desire for greater religious toleration with a demand for greater recognition of their civic independence. The trouble was especially severe in Cork, where serious rioting broke out. Carew was forced to send troops to restore order, and later tried, without success, to have the Cork city fathers tried for treason. His severe attitude is explained by his personal interest in the matter since Lady Carew's life was said to have been threatened during the riots, and she had been forced to take refuge in Shandon Castle.

== Later career ==
After the subjugation of Ireland, Carew sought recall to England, with failing health and anxieties of office affecting him. But it was only on Mountjoy's resignation from the office of lord-lieutenant that he was permitted to return, whereupon he was replaced as president of Munster. Under King James I he enjoyed immediate and lasting favour.

In 1603, he was appointed receiver-general and vice-chamberlain to the queen, Anne of Denmark. The receiver was in charge of collecting revenue from the queen's jointure lands. Carew also received large sums from the treasury to pay the queen's debts to the goldsmith George Heriot, the mercer William Stone, Elias Tillier a linen draper, and the silkman Thomas Henshawe. The Queen's secretary, William Fowler, a colleague on the Queen's Council, made Latin anagrams of his name.

In 1604, Carew was elected Member of Parliament for Hastings in the House of Commons of England. He was raised to the peerage as Baron Carew, of Clopton on 4 June 1605. In 1608 he was Master of the Ordnance.

In 1610 Carew was appointed Governor of Guernsey. He visited Ireland to report on prospects for a settlement and plantation of Ulster, and discovered rapid improvements and recovery in the country. He also suggested the creation of new boroughs in the northern province, in order to ensure a Protestant majority in the forthcoming parliament, a suggestion that was successfully adopted in 1613. He became a privy councillor in 1616. In 1618 he pleaded to the crown for the life of Sir Walter Raleigh—they had been intimate for 30 years—and his wife was a kind friend to the family after Raleigh's execution.

On the accession of Charles I in 1626, Carew became treasurer to Queen consort Henrietta Maria of France. He was further honoured when he was made Earl of Totnes on 5 February 1626.

== Writings ==
Carew had a considerable reputation as an antiquary and was a friend of William Camden, John Cotton, and Thomas Bodley. He gathered a large collection of materials relating to Irish history and pedigrees, which he left to his secretary, Sir Thomas Stafford (supposed to be his illegitimate son). A portion has disappeared, but 39 volumes that came into Laud's possession are now held in Lambeth Palace Library, and a further four at the Bodleian Library. A calendar of the former was published in six volumes between 1867 and 1873, edited by J. S. Brewer and W. Bullen, under the title Calendar of the Carew Manuscripts preserved in the Archiepiscopal Library at Lambeth. Carew's correspondence from Munster with Sir Robert Cecil was edited in 1864 by Sir John Maclean for the Camden Society, and his letters to Sir Thomas Roe (1615–1617) in 1860.

In the introduction to the Calendar of Carew Manuscripts the date of his birth is given as 1558, and his admission into Broadgates Hall in 1572, aged 15. In the preface to Carew's Letters to Sir Thomas Roe, it is given as 1557.

Other letters or papers are in The National Archives; among the manuscripts at the British Library; and calendared in the Historical Manuscripts Commission reports on the Marquess of Salisbury's manuscripts. Stafford published after Carew's death Pacata Hibernia, or the History of the Late Wars in Ireland (1633), the authorship of which he ascribes in his preface to Carew, but which has been attributed to Stafford himself. This was reprinted in 1810 and re-edited in 1896. A Fragment of the History of Ireland, a translation from a French version of an Irish original, and King Richard II in Ireland from the French, both by Carew, are printed in Walter Harris's Hibernica (1757). According to Anthony Wood, Carew contributed to the history of the reign of Henry V in John Speed's Chronicle. His opinion on the alarm of the Spanish invasion in 1596 has also been printed.

== Marriage ==
In May 1580, Carew married Joyce Clopton (d. 1637), the daughter and heiress of William Clopton (1538–1592) of Clopton House, near Stratford-upon-Avon, Warwickshire. The marriage was without progeny. He did however leave an illegitimate son, Sir Thomas Stafford, a courtier and MP, who served under Carew in Munster.

== Death and burial ==
Carew died on 27 March 1629 at the Savoy Palace in London, when on leaving no male progeny, his titles became extinct. He was buried in the Clopton Chantry Chapel (founded by Sir Hugh Clopton (c. 1440 – 1496), a Mercer and Lord Mayor of London) in the Church of the Holy Trinity, Stratford-upon-Avon, where survives his "noble monument (on which) the Earl and his Countess are represented lying side by side, in their robes and coronets, under an arch adorned by their coats of arms, in the midst whereof is a fair marble table containing (a) large epitaph, which is given at length by Prince". His widow took possession of Twickenham Meadows in Middlesex, where she lived for the rest of her life.

== Sources ==
- Richard Bagwell, Ireland under the Tudors vol.3 (London, 1885–1890).
- J. S. Brewer and W.Bullen eds. Calendar of Carew MSS. 1515–1624 6 vols (London, 1867–1873).
- Nicholas P. Canny Making Ireland British, 1580–1650 (Oxford University Press, 2001). ISBN 0-19-820091-9.
- Hiram Morgan Tyrone's Rebellion: The Outbreak of the Nine Years War in Ireland (Woodbridge, 1993).
- Standish O'Grady (ed.) "Pacata Hibernia" 2 vols. (London, 1896).
- Cyril Falls Elizabeth's Irish Wars (1950; reprint London, 1996). ISBN 0-09-477220-7.

Military offices
Preceded by Sir Robert Constable	Lieutenant-General of the Ordnance; 1592–1608	Succeeded by Sir Roger Dallison
Vacant	Master-General of the Ordnance; 1608–1629	Succeeded by The Lord Vere of Tilbury
Peerage of England
New creation	Earl of Totnes; 1626–1629	Extinct
New creation	Baron Carew; 1605–1629	Extinct
