= George Carew (priest) =

English churchman (1497/98–1583)

George Carew (1497/98–1583) was an English churchman who became Dean of Exeter.

== Life ==
He was the third son of Sir Edmund Carew. He graduated B.A. at Broadgates Hall, Oxford in 1522.

Carew was archdeacon of Totnes from 1534 to 1549, becoming canon of Exeter in 1535 and precentor of Exeter in 1549, and was archdeacon of Exeter from 1556 to 1569. He was dean of Bristol from 5 November 1552, but he was ejected in 1553 under Mary I. He resumed the post on the accession of Elizabeth I in 1558 and filled it until 1571. He was also appointed the same year Dean of the Chapel Royal in succession to the Catholic Thomas Thirlby, a post he held until his death.

He was also dean of Christ Church, Oxford from 1559 to 1561, dean and canon of Windsor from 1560 to 1577 and dean of Exeter in 1571 to 1583.

He died on 1 June 1583, and was buried in the church of St. Giles-in-the-Fields.

== Family ==
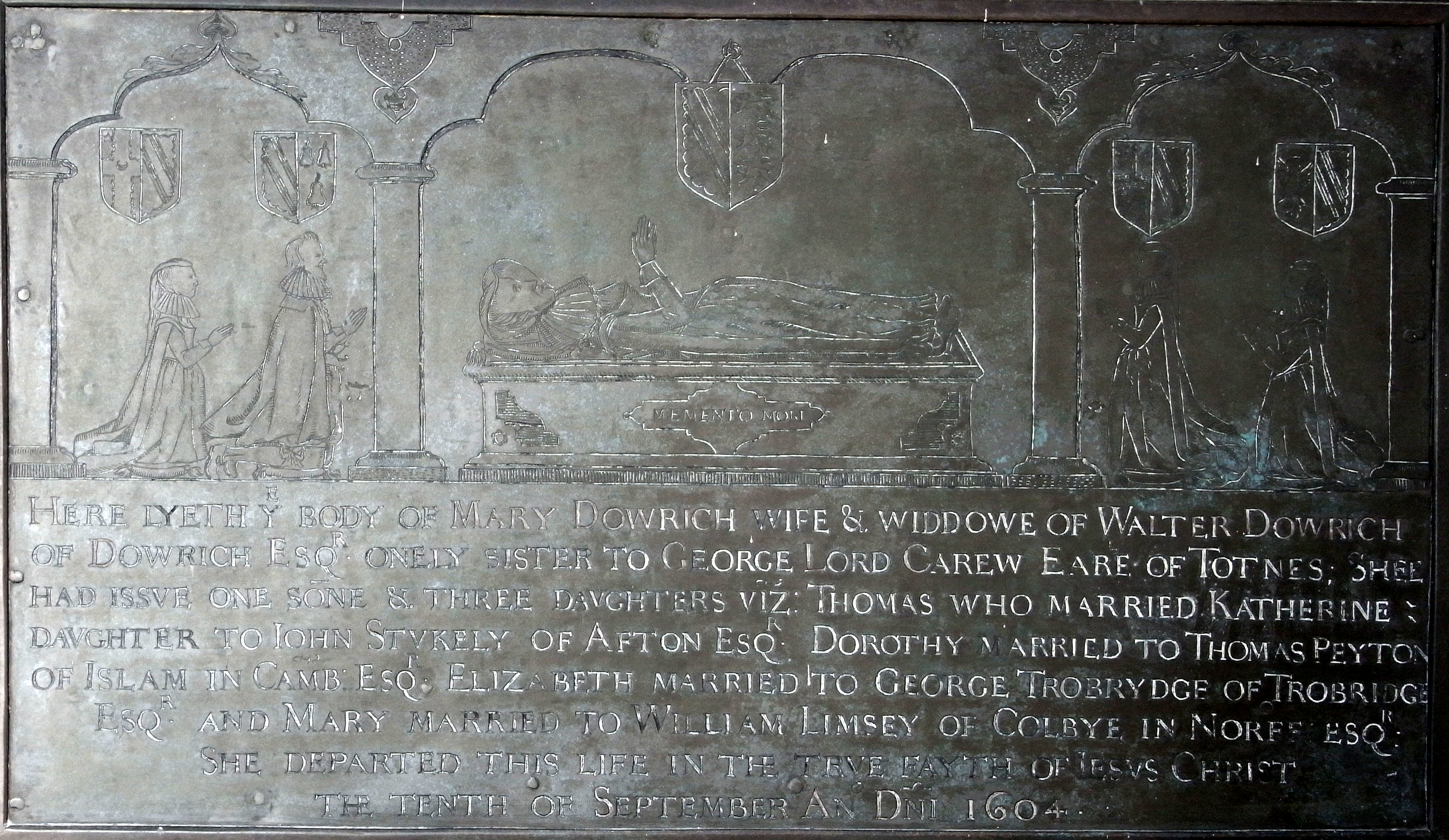
Monumental brass to Mary Carew (died 1604), Sandford Church, Devon

He married Anne Harvey, daughter of Sir Nicholas Harvey, by whom he had children including:

- Sir Peter Carew (died 1580), eldest son, a soldier who was slain at the Battle of Glenmalure in Ireland.
- George Carew, 1st Earl of Totnes, second son.
- Mary Carew (died 1604), wife of Walter II Dowrich of Dowrich in the parish of Sandford, Devon. Her monumental brass survives in Sandford Church.

Suggesting that there was no other daughter than Mary, are two items: her own monumental brass calling her the "only sister", and her husband's monumental brass calling her the "only daughter".
