= George Carew (admiral) =

English soldier, admiral and adventurer

Vice-Admiral Sir George Carew
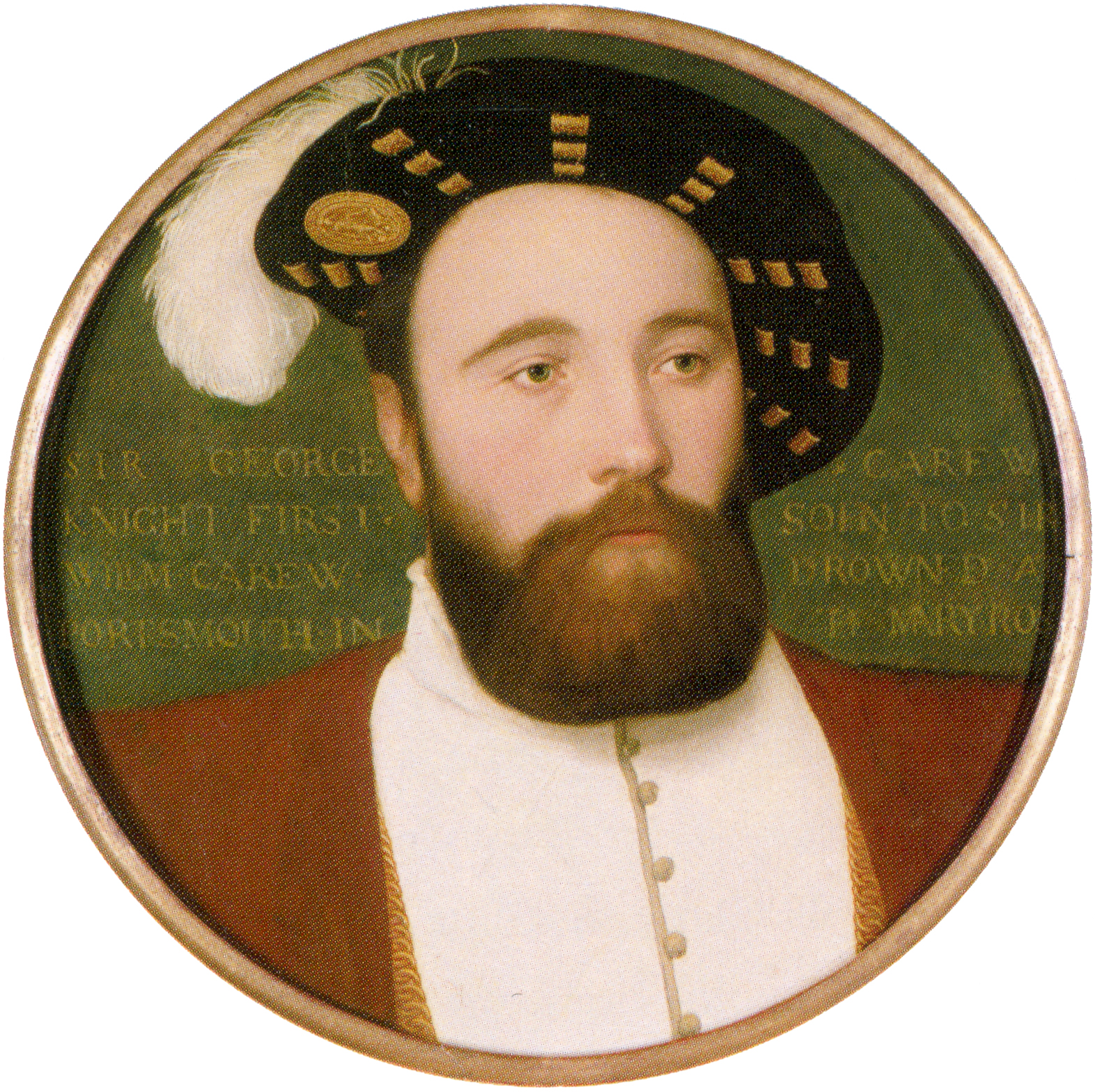
- Sir George Carew (1504–1545) (Circle of) Hans Holbein the Younger
- Born: c. 1504; Preston, Devon
- Died: 19 July 1545, aged c. 41; Portsmouth Harbour, Battle of the Solent
- Spouses: Thomasine Pollard; Mary Norris
- Military career
- Allegiance: (England)
- Branch: Army, Navy

Arms of Carew: Or, three lions passant in pale sable

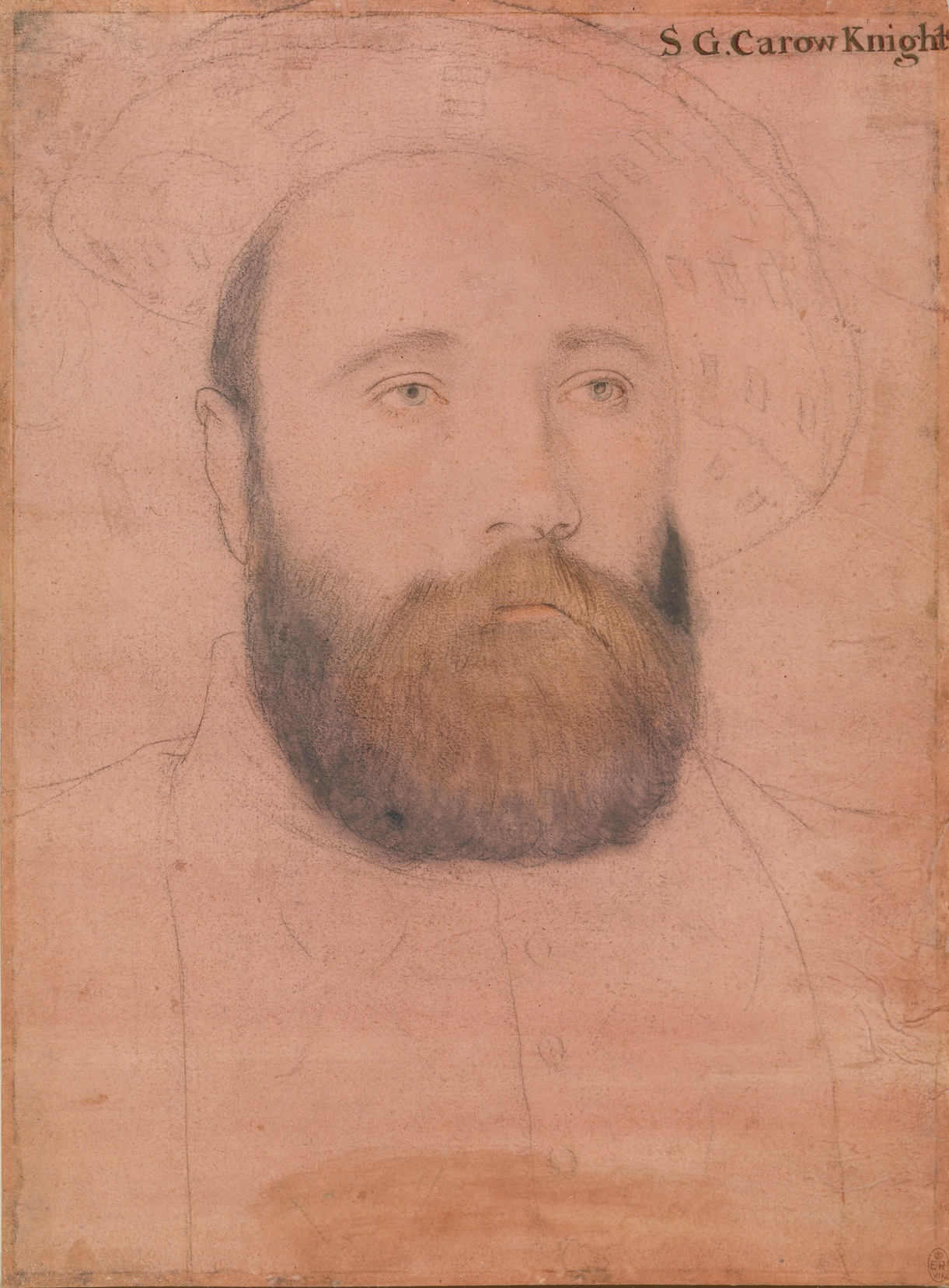
Sir George Carew, c.1532-43, by Hans Holbein the Younger, Royal Collection, Windsor Castle

Vice-Admiral, Sir George Carew (c. 1504 – 19 July 1545) was an English soldier, admiral and adventurer during the reign of King Henry VIII who died in the sinking of the Royal Navy flagship Mary Rose at the Battle of the Solent during an attempted French invasion in the Italian War of 1542–1546. Scion of a controversial and dramatic family, Carew had a wild youth and explored widely, being arrested several times for associating with rebellious vassals of the king. Carew successfully tamed this nature in his later years, during which he became a trusted advisor and military officer in the King's service.

== Early life ==
He was born about 1504, the son and heir of Sir William Carew (c. 1483–1536) of Mohuns Ottery near Luppitt in Devon by his wife Joan Courtenay, second daughter of Sir William Courtenay (died 1485) of Powderham, Sheriff of Devon in 1488, and his second wife, Mary.

George and his brother Peter Carew were sent to be educated in the household of their mother's (distant) cousin Henry Courtenay, 1st Marquess of Exeter. There they learned from adventurous relatives like their uncle Gawain Carew and kinsman Nicholas Carew, the latter of whom was later arrested and executed for treason.

Carew trained in the law, but swiftly became bored and in 1526 was in Blois, France, seeking service with Louise of Savoy, the French Regent. This attempt to serve a foreign power came to nothing, and was pardoned by King Henry VIII in November of the same year. The King also overlooked his youthful indiscretions with the followers of Elizabeth Barton and encouraged responsible behaviour in the young man.

== Marriages ==
George Carew married twice, but left no children:

- He married, firstly, Thomasine Pollard (died 1539), daughter of Sir Lewis Pollard (c. 1465 – 21 October 1526), Justice of the Common Pleas. The first Lady Carew died suddenly on 18 December 1539 at Calais after the arrival of Henry VIII's fourth queen, Anne of Cleves.
- He married, secondly, in the late autumn of 1540, Mary Norris, daughter of the courtier, Henry Norris of Berkshire and Mary Fiennes. Mary had served as a maid of honour in the household of Queen Anne of Cleves and in that of her successor, Catherine Howard, who presented the newly- married Lady Carew with a necklace or rosary of beads as a wedding gift.

== Career ==
Carew became interested in politics in the early 1530s and briefly sat in 1529 as a Member of Parliament for Devon and later served as High Sheriff of Devon (for 1536 and 1542), during which period he was knighted. Carew was also married for the first time during the 1530s, to Thomasine Pollard, daughter of Sir Lewis Pollard (c. 1465 – 1540), Justice of the Common Pleas.

In 1537, Carew was given his first sea commission, serving in the English Channel under Sir John Dudley during operations against pirates. In the following year 1538 he inherited his father's estates and returned to Devon to serve as Justice of the Peace. In 1539 Carew's wife Thomasine Pollard died and he again entered the King's service, taking over the strategically vital fort of Rysbank in the Calais Pale. The fort's previous commander and Carew's kinsman Nicholas Carew had paid with his life for his machinations against the King. George Carew was disgusted with the poor state of readiness and repair in which he found the fort and set about effecting repairs and became involved in the administration of Calais under its Deputy Arthur Plantagenet, 1st Viscount Lisle.

== Government service ==
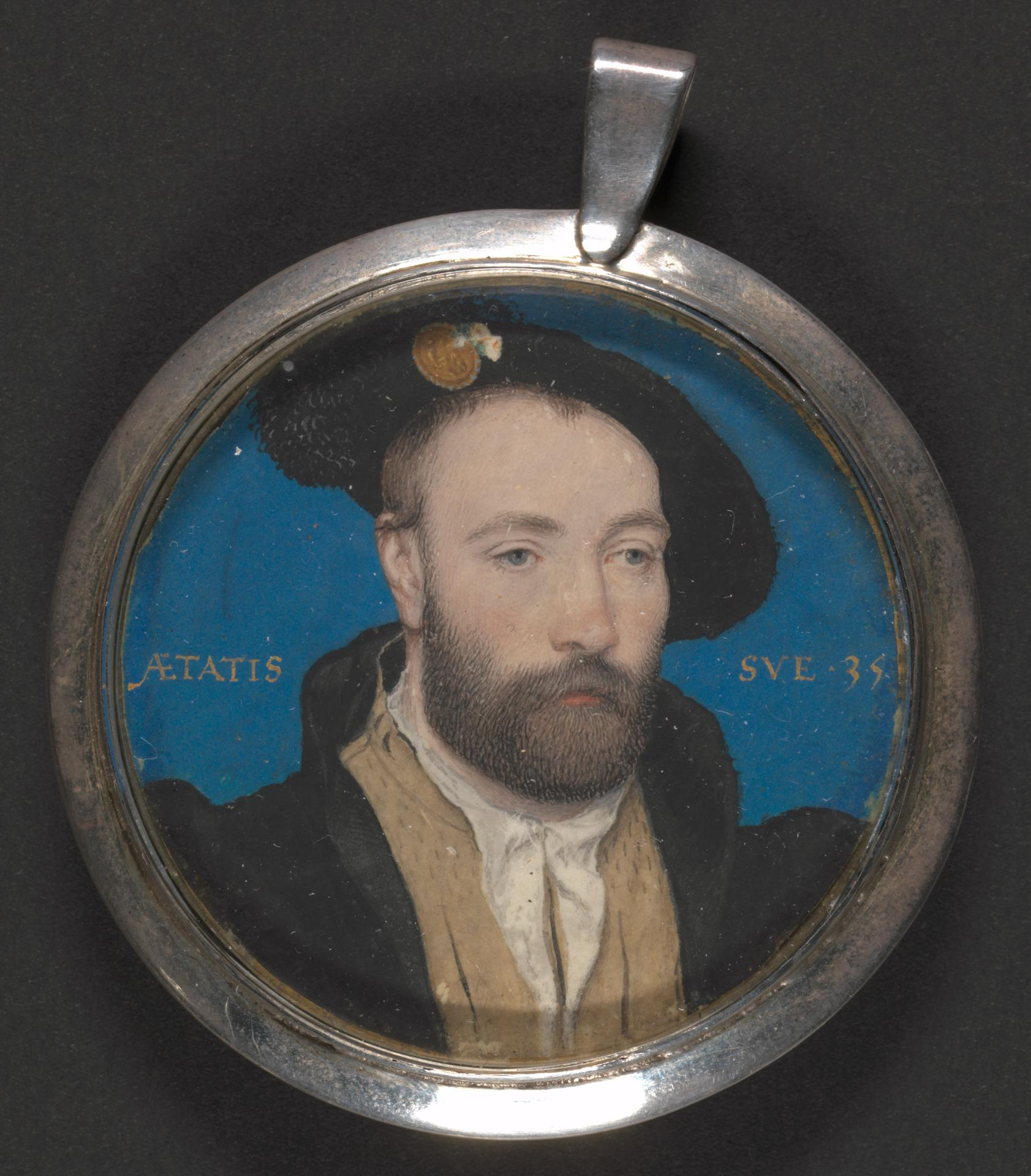
Portrait of a man, probably Sir George Carew, c. 1540, Attributed to Hans Holbein the Younger

Carew took pains during this period to distance himself from the Roman Catholic upbringing he had in the household of the Marquess of Exeter and openly supported Protestant groups who had fled to Calais after persecution elsewhere in Europe. His stance on this issue brought admiration from several contemporaries, including John Foxe. Carew was with the deputation which met Anne of Cleves in December 1539 and the following year he was briefly arrested and questioned in relation to a plan to hand Rysbank over to the French, a plot in which Lisle was implicated but Carew apparently was not. In the late autumn of 1540 Carew remarried, to Mary Norris, daughter of the courtier Henry Norris of Berkshire, and the couple settled at Polsloe Priory near Exeter. Carew had taken his position seriously, and was rewarded with a second term as sheriff in 1542 and was appointed Steward of the possessions of the Marquis of Exeter, a role with annual salary of £30. Two years later in 1544 he was made lieutenant of the Gentlemen Pensioners and was awarded the large salary of £365 a year.

Apparently bored with Rysbank and political life, in the summer of 1543 Carew applied to join the army of Sir John Wallop in Flanders as a lieutenant general of horse. Although Carew was an accomplished jouster, he was tactically inexperienced and learned the military arts through his position on Wallop's army council. With his brother Peter, George Carew saw action in skirmishes outside the French-held towns of Thérouanne and Landrecies during Wallop's campaigns against those towns. At Landrecis, Carew twice came close to disaster, almost being killed by a sniper's bullet during the summer and in November actually being captured after pursuing a fleeing band of French cavalry too far and finding himself isolated. He was soon freed however at the express request of King Henry VIII and was returned to the English army. In 1544 Carew raised twenty soldiers to join Wallop's campaign against Boulogne and was also given a subordinate naval command under Dudley in the English Channel.

== Drowning in the Mary Rose ==
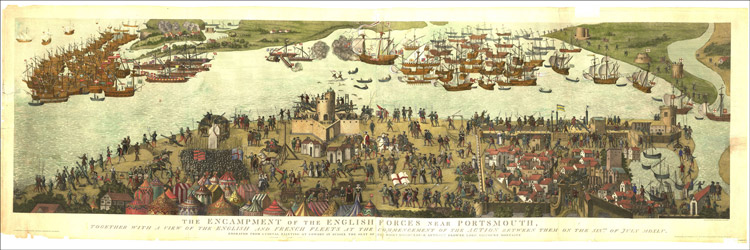
Battle of the Solent, at which Carew lost his life. "Cowdray engraving" c. 1545

In July 1545, with a French invasion expected, Carew was summoned to King Henry VIII's council of war aboard his flagship Great Harry in Portsmouth. There Carew was appointed Vice-Admiral in charge of the fleet in Portsmouth and presented with a golden whistle as symbol of office. The French fleet landed on the Isle of Wight the same day and shortly afterwards sailed for Portsmouth. The French force greatly outnumbered the English, comprising 175 ships including 25 great galleys. Carew, as captain of the Mary Rose, the vice-flagship of the English carrack fleet, sailed to confront them and met with disaster.

It may never be known exactly why the Mary Rose sank in the entrance to Portsmouth harbour on 19 July 1545, but it is believed that water entered open gunports after firing a broadside and the ship went down in minutes. The report that Carew's last words called out to his uncle Gawen Carew aboard an accompanying ship, that "I have the sort of knaves I cannot rule", may indicate command and discipline problems. Carew had only taken command of the ship that same day and his authority was far from established. The dangerous combination of winds, tides and shallows makes the Solent a particularly hazardous body of water. Modern studies have also indicated that the aging 700-ton warship was dangerously overloaded, with heavy bronze cannon that she was not designed to carry, and nearly 500 men aboard, many dressed in full armour. Scientific examination of the crew's skulls has revealed that the majority of the men aboard 'Mary Rose' the day she foundered were probably from Southern Europe, maybe mercenaries or prisoners of war.

Henry VIII watched from Southsea Castle as the Mary Rose heeled over and sank shortly after joining the battle, and heard the screams of her drowning crew, most of whom were trapped beneath a heavy anti-boarding net stretched across her weather deck. Lady Carew, who was with the king, fainted at the sight and was attended by him. Of the 500 men aboard fewer than 25 survived, Carew not among them. His body was never recovered. Despite the disaster, the French fleet failed to engage effectively with the English and turned away to perform minor raids elsewhere on the coast returning to France in August. When the Mary Rose was raised nearly 450 years later, pewter plates stamped with "G.C.", Carew's initials, were among the artifacts recovered from the wreck.

Carew's widow subsequently married Sir Arthur Champernowne in 1546. She returned to court as a lady-in-waiting to the King's daughters, Mary and Elizabeth.

== Sources ==
- Cooper, J. P. D. (23 September 2004). "Carew, Sir George (c. 1504–1545), soldier and naval commander". Oxford Dictionary of National Biography (online ed.). Oxford University Press. doi:10.1093/ref:odnb/38895. (Subscription, Wikipedia Library access or UK public library membership required.)
- Kirk, L. M.; Hawkyard, A. D. K. (1982). "Carew, George (by 1505-45), of Mohun's Ottery, Devon". In Bindoff, S. T. (ed.). The History of Parliament: the House of Commons 1509-1558. The History of Parliament.
- Loades, David Michael (2017). "More Documents for the Last Campaign of the Mary Rose". In Vale, Brian (ed.). The Naval Miscellany. Vol. 8. Routledge for the Navy Records Society. pp. 49–84. ISBN 9781138219793.
- Russell, Gareth (2017). Young and Damned and Fair: the Life of Catherine Howard. London: William Collins. ISBN 9780008128296.
- Wagner, John A.; Schmid, Susan Walters, eds. (2012). Encyclopedia of Tudor England. Santa Barbara: ABC-CLIO. pp. 211–212. ISBN 9781598842982.
- Vivian, J. L. (1895). The Visitations of the County of Devon, Comprising the Heralds' Visitations of 1531, 1564, to 1620, with additions by J. L. Vivian. Exeter: H.S. Eland.
