= William Huddesfield =

15th-century English statesman

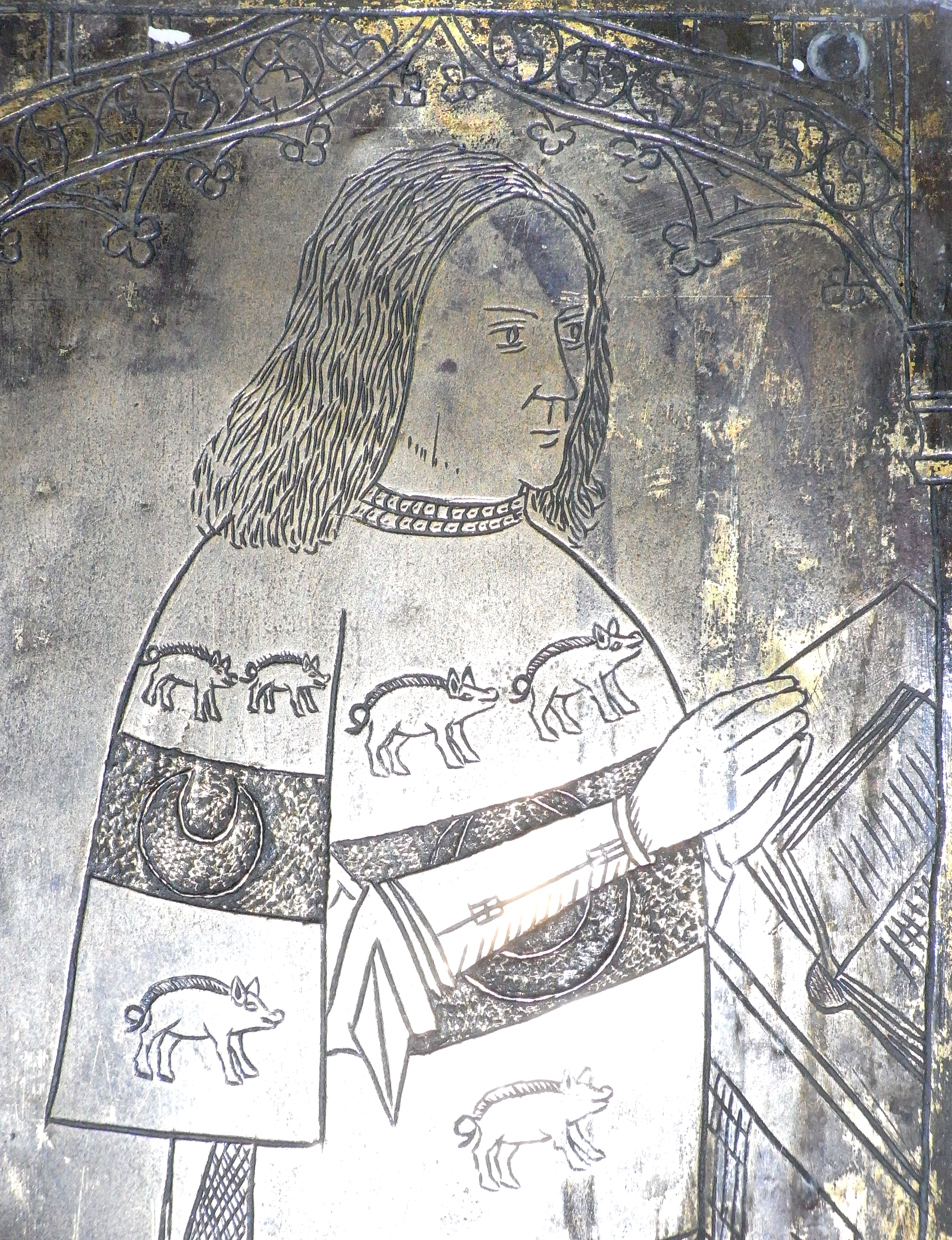
Sir William Huddesfield, detail from his monumental brass in Shillingford St George Church, Devon. On his tabard are displayed his arms: Argent, a fess between three boars passant facing sinister sable a crescent for difference

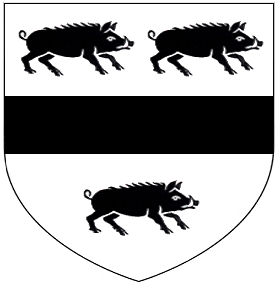
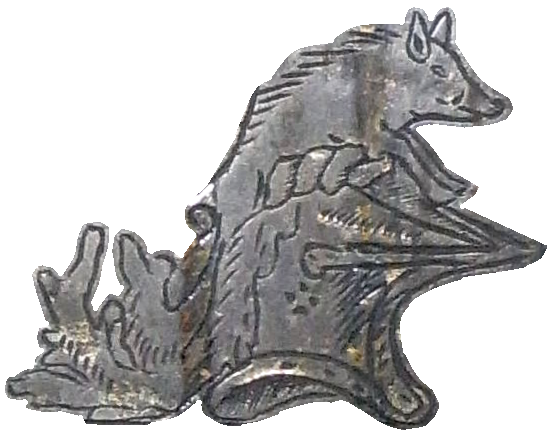
Left: Arms of Huddesfield: Argent, a fess between three boars passant facing sinister (Note: The usual attitude of heraldic beasts is facing dexter; the boars are shown facing sinister on Huddesfield's tabard, but facing dexter on the brass escutcheon set into the ledger stone of his monument) sable; right: crest of Huddesfield: A boar passant, detail from monumental brass of Sir William Huddesfield in Shillingford St George Church

Sir William Huddesfield (died 1499) of Shillingford St George in Devon, was Attorney General for England and Wales to Kings Edward IV (1461–1483) and Henry VII (1485–1509). He built the tower of St George's Church, Shillingford.

== Origins ==
He was the son of William Huddesfield of Shillingford by his wife Alice Gold, daughter of John Gold (alias Gould) of Seaborough and Sampit in Dorchester, MP for Dorchester in 1391, and was the grandson of William Huddesfield of Honiton, Devon.

== Marriages and children ==
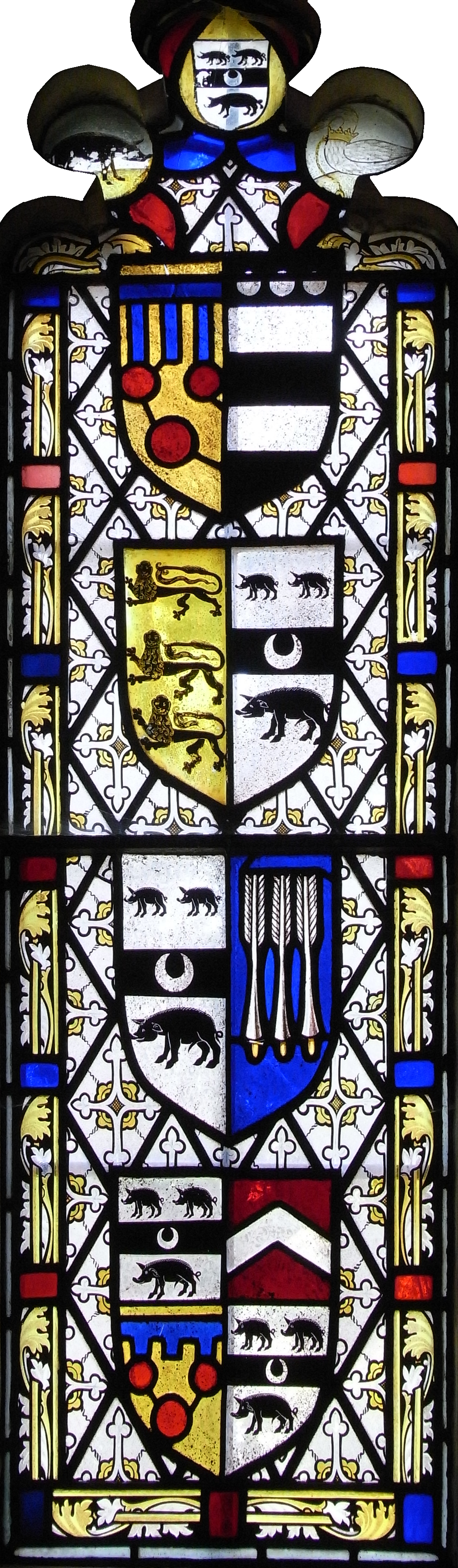
Huddesfield heraldic window, 19th century, south side of chancel of Shillingford St George Church. (Note: Arms: trefoil at top: Left: Courtenay boar, one of the Courtenay supporters; right: Bohun swan, one of the Courtenay supporters; centre: Huddesfield arms. Top shield: Courtenay (Or, three torteaux a label of three points azure) impaling Hungerford (Sable, two bars argent in chief three plates), representing the marriage of the parents of Katherine Courtenay, wife of Sir William Huddesfield. 2nd shield down: Carew (Or, three lions passant guardant in pale sable) impaling Huddesfield, representing the marriage of Sir Edmund Carew and Katherine Huddesfield, daughter of Sir William Huddesfield. 3rd shield down: Huddesfield impaling Bosum (Azure, three bird-bolts argent), representing Sir William Huddesfield's first marriage to Jennet or Elizabeth Bosum. Bottom shield: Quarterly 1st & 4th: Huddesfield; 2nd: Fulford (Gules, a chevron argent); 3rd: Courtenay. (incorrect heraldic usage, quartering should only show arms of heiresses))

He married twice:

=== First marriage ===
Firstly to Jennet (or Elizabeth) Bosome, daughter and heiress of John Bosome (alias Bosom, Bozun, Bosum, etc.) of Bosom's Hele, in the parish of Dittisham, Devon, and widow of Sir Baldwin de Fulford (died 1476) of Great Fulford in the parish of Dunsford, Devon, Sheriff of Devon in 1460, a Knight of the Sepulchre and Under-Admiral to John Holland, 2nd Duke of Exeter (died 1447), High Admiral of England. By Jennet Bosome he had one daughter, according to Pole (died 1635):

- Katherine Huddesfield (died 1499), wife of Sir Edmund Carew (1465–1513), Baron Carew of Mohuns Ottery in the parish of Luppitt, Devon, knighted by King Henry VII at the Battle of Bosworth in 1485, and killed in 1513 at the Siege of Thérouanne, in the County of Artois, part of the Battle of the Spurs or Battle of Guinegate. She was the grandmother of Admiral Sir George Carew (c. 1504 – 1545) who died in the sinking of the Royal Navy flagship Mary Rose at the Battle of the Solent during an attempted French invasion in the Italian War of 1542–1546, and of his brother Sir Peter Carew (c. 1514 – 1575), an adventurer who took part in the Tudor conquest of Ireland.

=== Second marriage ===
Secondly (as her third husband) to Katherine Courtenay (died 1514), a daughter of Sir Philip Courtenay (died 1463) of Powderham, Devon, by his wife Elizabeth Hungerford, daughter of Walter Hungerford, 1st Baron Hungerford (died 1449), and sister of Peter Courtenay (died 1492) Bishop of Exeter and of Sir Philip Courtenay (b.1445) of Molland, MP and Sheriff of Devon in 1471. She requested in her will to be buried in the Greyfriars Church, Exeter "before St Francis beside the High Altar", but was probably buried at Shillingford with her husband. A monumental brass of Huddesfield and his second wife Katherine Courtenay survives in Shillingford St George Church. His sister-in-law Phillipa Courtenay married his step-son Sir Thomas Fulford (died 1489), the eldest son and heir of Sir Baldwin de Fulford (died 1476) by his first wife Jane Bosome By his second wife Katherine Courtenay he had one daughter, according to Pole:

- Elizabeth Huddesfield, wife of Sir Anthony Poyntz (died 1534) of Iron Acton, Gloucestershire.

== Death and burial ==
He died on 20 March 1499, and was buried in Shillingford St George's Church, where his chest tomb survives against the north chancel wall.

== Monumental brass ==
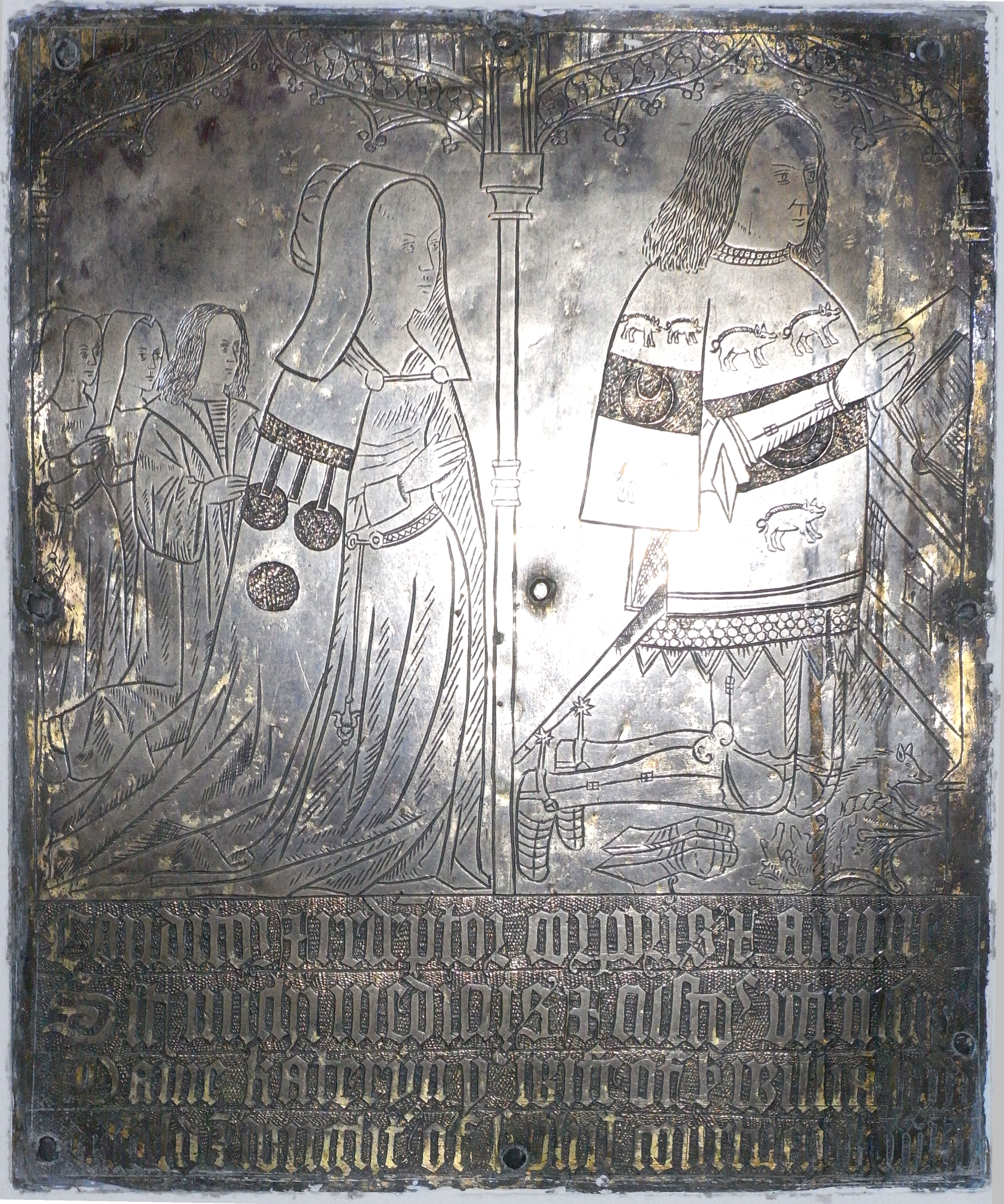
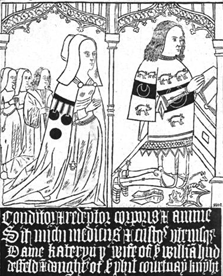
Monumental brass of Sir William Huddesfield (died 1499) and of his wife Katherine Courtenay (died 1514), Shillingford St George Church, Devon. Right: 19th century drawing or rubbing

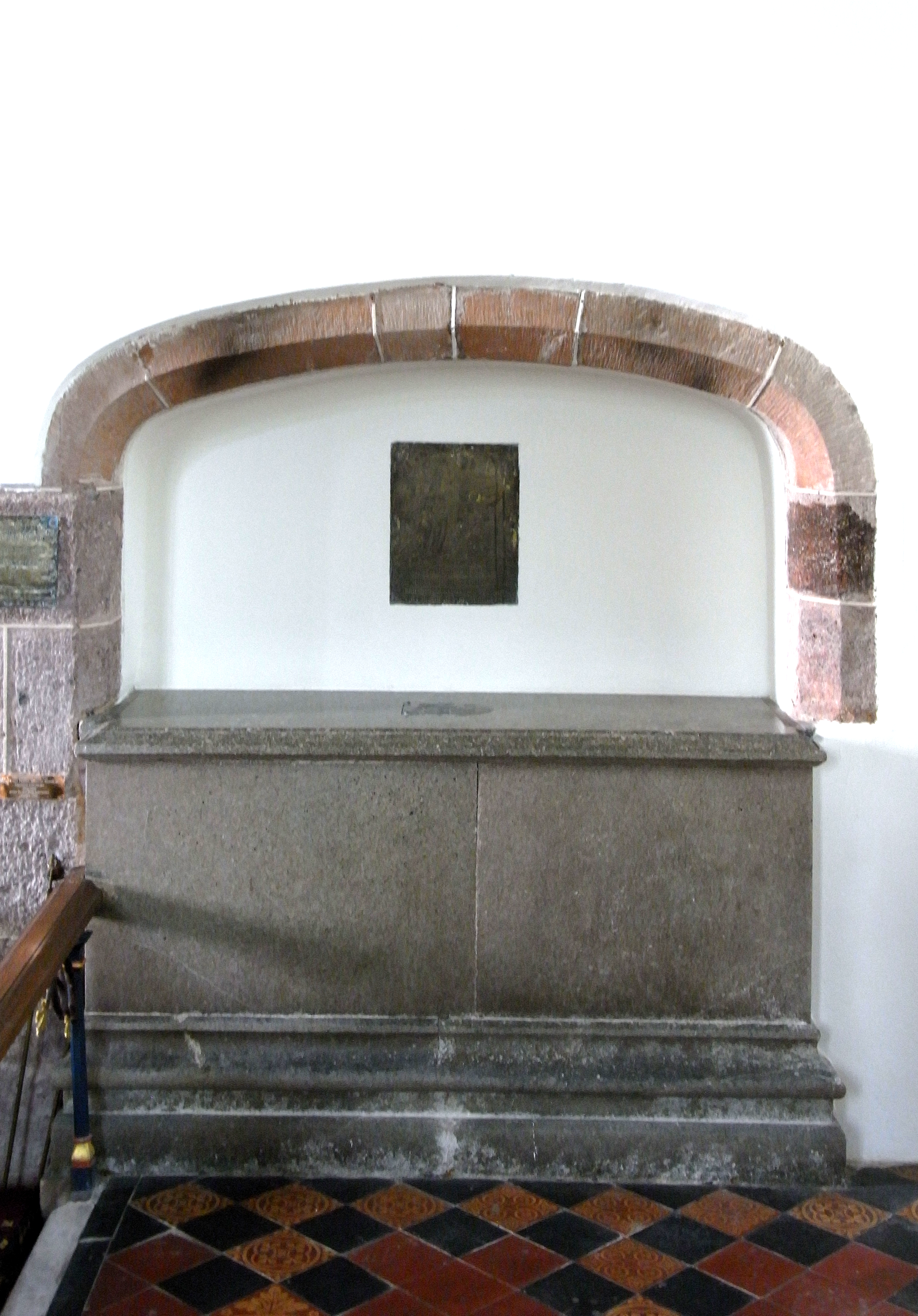
Easter Sepulchre monument (remade 19th century) to Sir William Huddesfield and his wife Katherine Courtenay. North wall of chancel, Shillingford St George Church. It contains two monumental brasses: one affixed to the wall and one to the slab

A monumental brass of Huddesfield and his second wife Katherine Courtenay survives in Shillingford St George Church, and the arms of Bosome (Azure, three bird bolts in pale points downward or) survive in a stained glass window in the same church. The brass is affixed to the wall on the north side of the chancel, above a chest tomb, with grey marble slab on top, set into an Easter Sepulchre style alcove remade in the 19th century. Around the edge of the slab is an ident for an inscription in brass, now lost, but transcribed in 1630 by the Devon historian Thomas Westcote (c. 1567 – c. 1637) as follows:

"here lieth Sir William Huddiffeild, knight, Attorney-general to King Edward IV, and of the Council to King Henry VII, and Justice of Oyer and Determiner, which died the 10th day of march in the year of Our Lord 1499, on whose soul Jesus have mercy, Amen. Honor Deo et Gloria".

The brass depicts a knight and a lady, both kneeling under a double canopy, with a son and two daughters. The bare headed knight is fully dressed in armour, over which he wears a tabard showing the arms of Huddesfield with a crescent for difference, with sword and spurs. in front of him is a prie dieu, on which is an open book, and his gauntlets are on the floor by his side, with his helmet on top of which is his crest, a boar rampant. The lady wears a pedimental head-dress and lappets, with gown, ornamented girdle with pomander hanging therefrom. Over all she wears a robe of estate showing the arms of Courtenay: Or, three torteaux a label of three points azure. Behind her kneels her only son by her second husband George Rogers, and behind him her two daughters Elizabeth and Katherine. The following inscription, partly in Latin, appears below (with abbreviations extended):

Conditor et Rede(m)ptor corporis et anime sit mihi medicus et custos utriusque. Dame Kateryn ye wife of Sr Willm Huddesfeld & dought of S'r Phil' Courtnay, kny'kt.

A framed rubbing of the brass hangs in the chapel of Powderham Castle.
