= John Hooker (English constitutionalist) =

Member of the Parliament of England

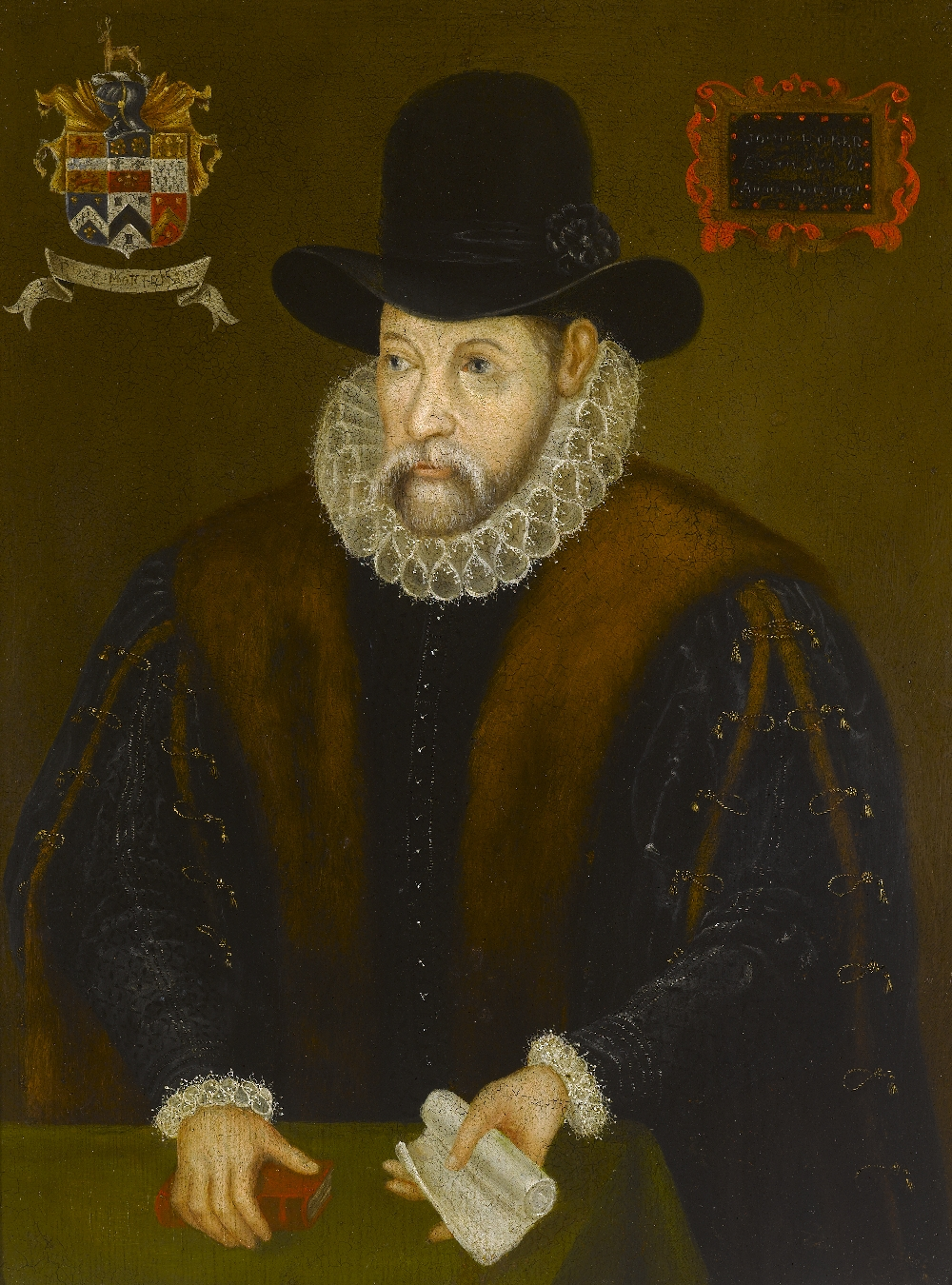
Portrait of John Hooker (c.1527–1601) of Exeter. British (English) School, 16th/17th century. Royal Albert Memorial Museum, Exeter

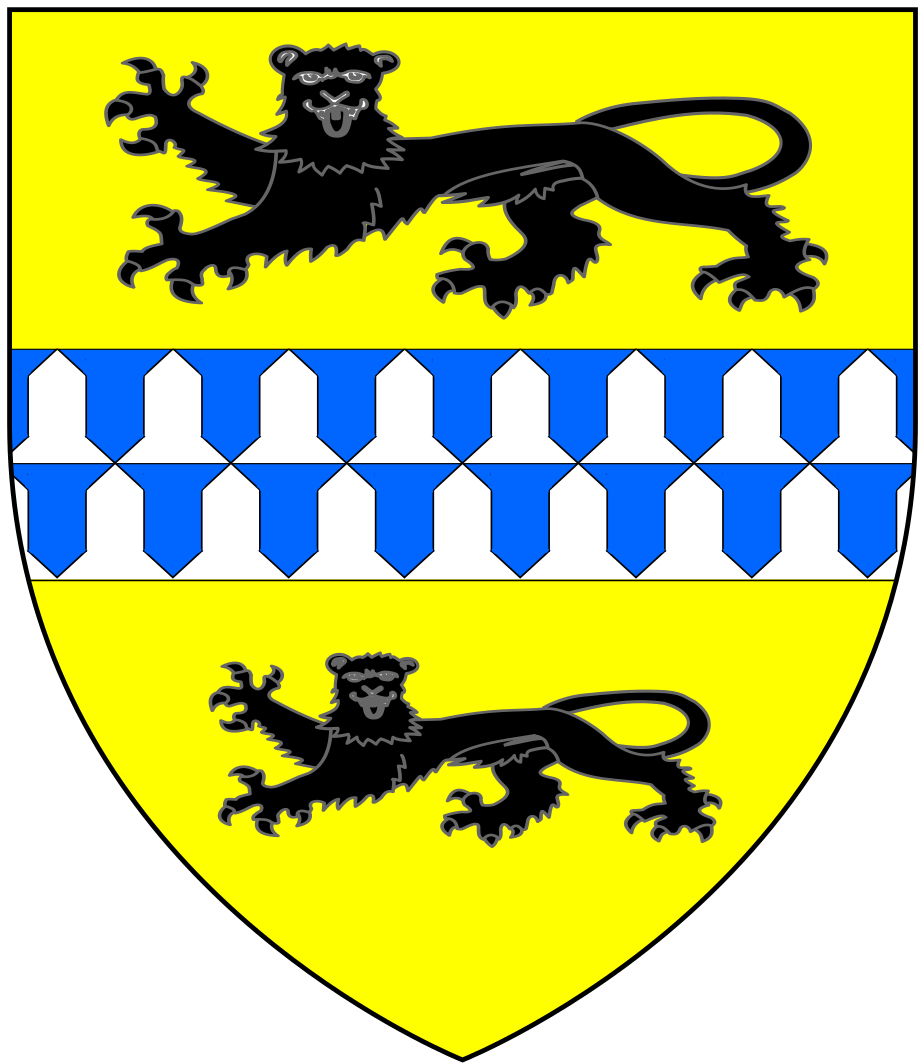
Arms of Hooker alias Vowell, of Exeter: Or, a fess vair between two lions passant guardant sable

John Hooker (or "Hoker") alias John Vowell (c. 1527–1601) of Exeter in Devon, was an English historian, writer, solicitor, antiquary, and civic administrator. From 1555 to his death he was Chamberlain of Exeter. He was twice MP for Exeter in 1570/1 and 1586, and for Athenry in Ireland in 1569 and wrote an influential treatise on parliamentary procedure. He wrote an eye-witness account of the siege of Exeter during the Prayer Book Rebellion in 1549. He spent several years in Ireland as legal adviser to Sir Peter Carew, and following Carew's death in 1575 wrote his biography. He was one of the editors of the second edition of Raphael Holinshed's Chronicles, published in 1587. His last, unpublished and probably uncompleted work was the first topographical description of the county of Devon. He founded a guild of Merchant Adventurers under a charter from Queen Mary. He was the uncle of Richard Hooker, the influential Anglican theologian.

== Origins ==
Hooker was born at Bourbridge Hall in Exeter, Devon, England. He was the second son and eventual heir of Robert Vowell (d.1538) of Exeter alias Hooker by his third wife Agnes Dobell (or Doble), daughter of John Dobell of Woodbridge in Suffolk. His grandfather was John Vowell alias Hooker (d.1493), MP for Exeter.

The earliest recorded member of the Vowell family was Jenaph (or Seraph) Vowell of Pembroke in Wales, from whom John Hooker (d.1601) was 6th in descent. The original Welsh name was possibly ap-Howell. Jenaph's son Jago Vowell married Alice Hooker, daughter and heiress of Richard Hooker of Hurst Castle, Southampton. Thus, as was commonly required in former times on receipt of an inheritance, the Vowell family assumed the name Hooker in the 15th century, but frequently retained the earlier name; in fact, John Hooker was known as John Vowell for much of his life. By the time he was born the family had been prominent in Exeter for several generations.

== Education ==
Hooker received an excellent classical education, reading Roman law at Oxford followed by a period in Europe studying with leading Protestant divines, notably Pietro Martire Vermigli.

== Career ==
=== In Exeter ===
[I denounce those who chose] to supporte the authoritie of the Idoll of Rome whome they never sawe in contempte of their trewe & lawfull kinge, whom they knewe and oughte to obeye.

— Hooker, on the siege of Exeter, in The description of the citie of Excester, 1.67

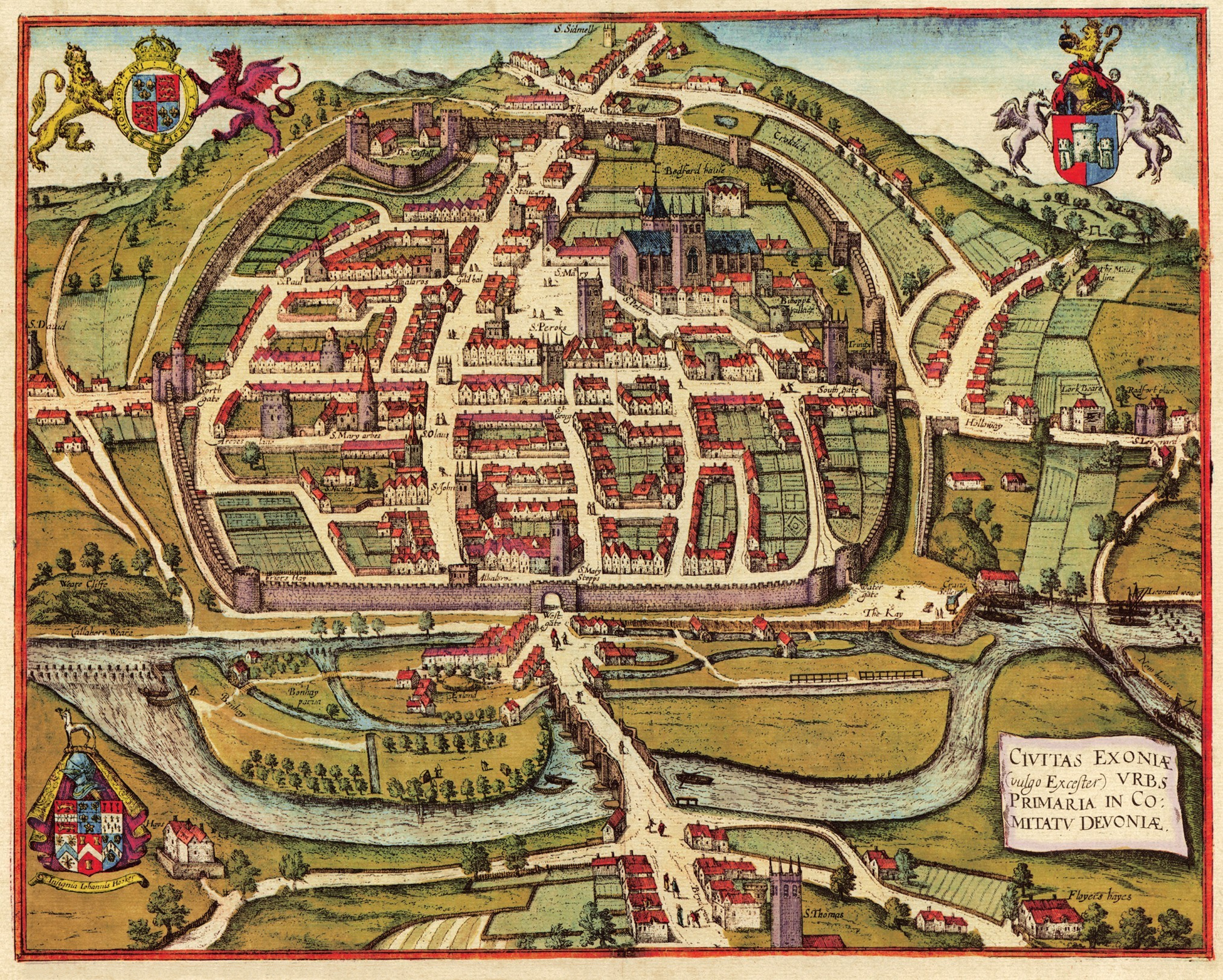
A map of Exeter in the time of Hooker, with his quartered arms at bottom left

During the Prayer Book Rebellion of 1549 Hooker experienced at first hand the siege of Exeter, and left a vivid manuscript account of its events in which he made no effort to conceal his anti-Catholic sympathies. From 1551 to 1553 he was employed by Myles Coverdale during his short incumbency as Bishop of Exeter. In 1555 he became the first chamberlain of Exeter, a post he held until his death.

As chamberlain he was responsible for the city's finances, he dealt with disputes between guilds and merchants, oversaw the rebuilding of the high school, planted many trees in the city, and collected and put in order the city's archives. He used these archives to compile his "Annals" of the City in which he details the characteristics of every Tudor mayor of Exeter, and in 1578 he wrote and published The Lives of the Bishops of Exeter. In 1570/71 he was MP for Exeter.

At a time when it was deemed essential for cities and nations to have ancient lineage, Hooker described the supposed foundation of Exeter by Corinaeus, nephew of Brutus of Britain, son of Aeneas. He advocated emulating the governmental institutions of the Roman Republic, which in his opinion brought Rome to greatness, and held up the municipal government of Exeter as a model republican commonwealth worthy of emulation.

=== In Ireland ===
In 1568, possibly because he regarded himself as underpaid for the work he was doing for Exeter, Hooker was persuaded by Sir Peter Carew to accompany him to Ireland as his legal adviser. He organised Carew's papers in support of his claim for the barony of Idrone, a task to which he committed himself so deeply that in 1569 he was returned to the Irish parliament as member for Athenry. Hooker later wrote a biography of Carew, The dyscourse and dyscoverye of the lyffe of Sir Peter Carew, in which he almost certainly understated the deceit and aggression behind Carew's Irish venture.

Until Carew's death in 1575, Hooker spent much time in Ireland, but he had also been returned to the English parliament in 1571 as one of the burgesses of Exeter. The session lasted only a few weeks, but he kept a journal in which he accurately recorded the proceedings. His experiences in the Irish and English parliaments led him to write a treatise on parliamentary practice, The Order and Usage how to Keepe a Parlement in England, which was published in two editions in 1572. One edition had a preface addressed to William FitzWilliam, Lord Deputy of Ireland and was clearly intended to bring order to the Irish assembly; the other was addressed to the Exeter city authorities, presumably to aid his successor burgesses. In writing his treatise Hooker took much inspiration from the Modus Tenendi Parliamentum, a treatise from the early 14th century.

In 1586 Hooker again represented Exeter in parliament. At this time he was one of the editors of the second edition of Raphael Holinshed's Chronicles, published in 1587. Hooker's Order and Usage was included within it and he contributed an updated history of Ireland, with parts of his Life of Carew and a translation of the Expugnatio Hibernica ("Conquest of Ireland") by Gerald of Wales. In his Irish section, he made his religious and political sympathies very clear, repeatedly denouncing the Catholicism of the native Irish, seeing it as the cause both of their poverty and rebelliousness. Rome he described as "the pestilent hydra" and the pope "the sonne of sathan, and the manne of sinne, and the enimie unto the crosse of Christ, whose bloodthirstiness will never be quenched".

=== Later life ===
a verye ancient towne ... and maye be equall with some cities for it is the cheffe emporium of that countrie and most inhabited with merchantes whose cheffest trade in tyme of peace was with Spayne ... it is a clene and sweete towne, very well paved...

— Hooker, on Barnstaple, in Synopsis Corographical, 261–262

Hooker continued to serve Exeter in his later years, becoming coroner in 1583 and recorder in 1590. He was also appointed as steward of Bradninch by Sir Walter Raleigh in 1587. By this time he was involved in the long task of organising and writing his historically-based description of his home county which he titled Synopsis Corographical of the county of Devon. He probably started work on this before his antiquary friend Richard Carew began writing his similar Survey of Cornwall. In writing his Synopsis, Hooker was influenced by the style and structure of William Harrison's Description of England, which had been published in 1577 as part of the first edition of Holinshed's Chronicles.

Although Hooker revised his Synopsis many times, he probably never completed it to his satisfaction. The work survives today as two almost identical manuscripts, one in the British Library the other in the Devon Record Office, which were used as source material for many later topographical descriptions of the county, including Thomas Westcote's Survey of Devon (1630) and Tristram Risdon's Chorographical Description or Survey of the County of Devon (c. 1632). He wrote an account of the Black Assize of Exeter in 1586 from which a virulent and deadly disease spread from prisoners in Exeter Prison to the courtroom in Exeter Castle and thence to the whole county.

== Marriage and children ==
He married twice:

- Firstly in the 1540s he married Martha Tucker (died pre-1586), a daughter of Robert Tucker of Exeter by whom he had three sons and two daughters including:
  - Robert Hooker (d.1602) eldest son.
- Secondly he married Anastryce Bridgeman (c. 1540–1599), a daughter of Edward Bridgeman of Exeter, by whom he had seven sons and five daughters.

== Death and burial ==
In later life his health failed. He wrote: "...my sight waxeth Dymme my hyringe [hearing] very thycke my speache imperfecte and my memory very feeble". He died in Exeter on 8 November 1601 at the age of 76 and was buried at St Mary Major, Exeter.

== Works ==
- Orders Enacted for Orphans and for their Portions within the Citie of Exeter, London, 1575
- The Antique Description and Account of the City of Exeter: In Three Parts, All Written Purely by John Vowell, Alias Hoker
- The order and usage of the keeping of a parlement in England, 1572
- A pamphlet of the offices and duties of everie particular sworned officer of the citie of Excester (sic) 1584
- The Life and Times of Sir Peter Carew, (d.1575), whose mural monument Hooker erected in Exeter Cathedral, as evidenced by the two escutcheons showing the arms of Hooker at the base of the monument.
