= Peter Carew (adventurer) =

English adventurer (1514?–1575)

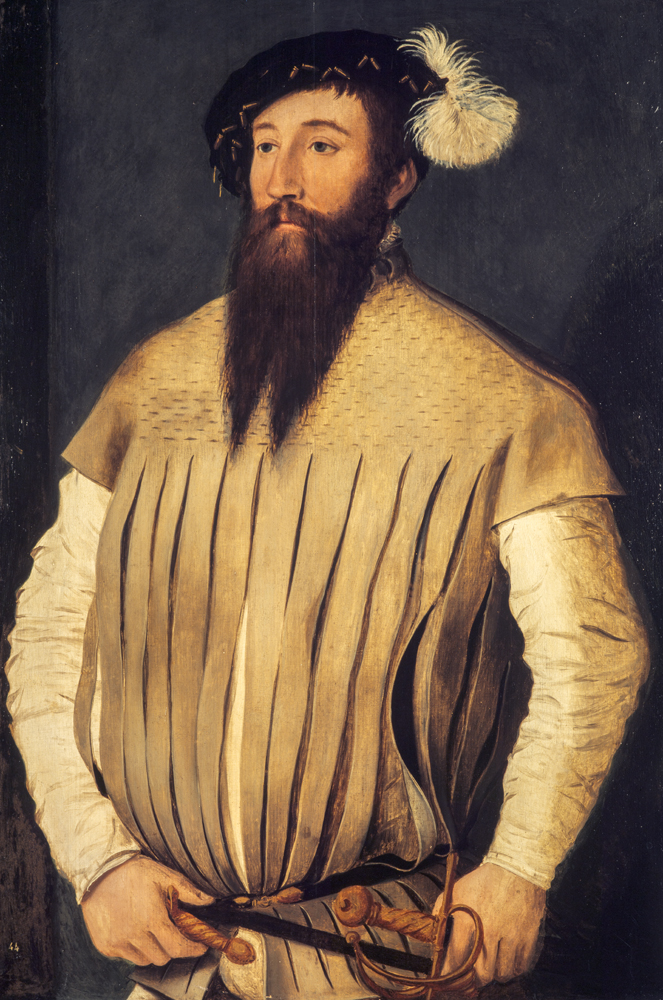
- Sir Peter Carew by Gerlach Flicke

Member of Parliament for Exeter
- In office 1563

Member of Parliament for Devon
- In office 1553; 1559

Member of Parliament for Dartmouth
- In office 1547

High Sheriff of Devon
- In office 1547

Member of Parliament for Tavistock

Personal details
- Born: c. 1514 Ottery Mohun, Devon, England
- Died: 27 November 1575 (aged 60–61) Ross, County Waterford, Ireland
- Relatives: George Carew (brother); Peter Carew (cousin); George Carew (cousin)

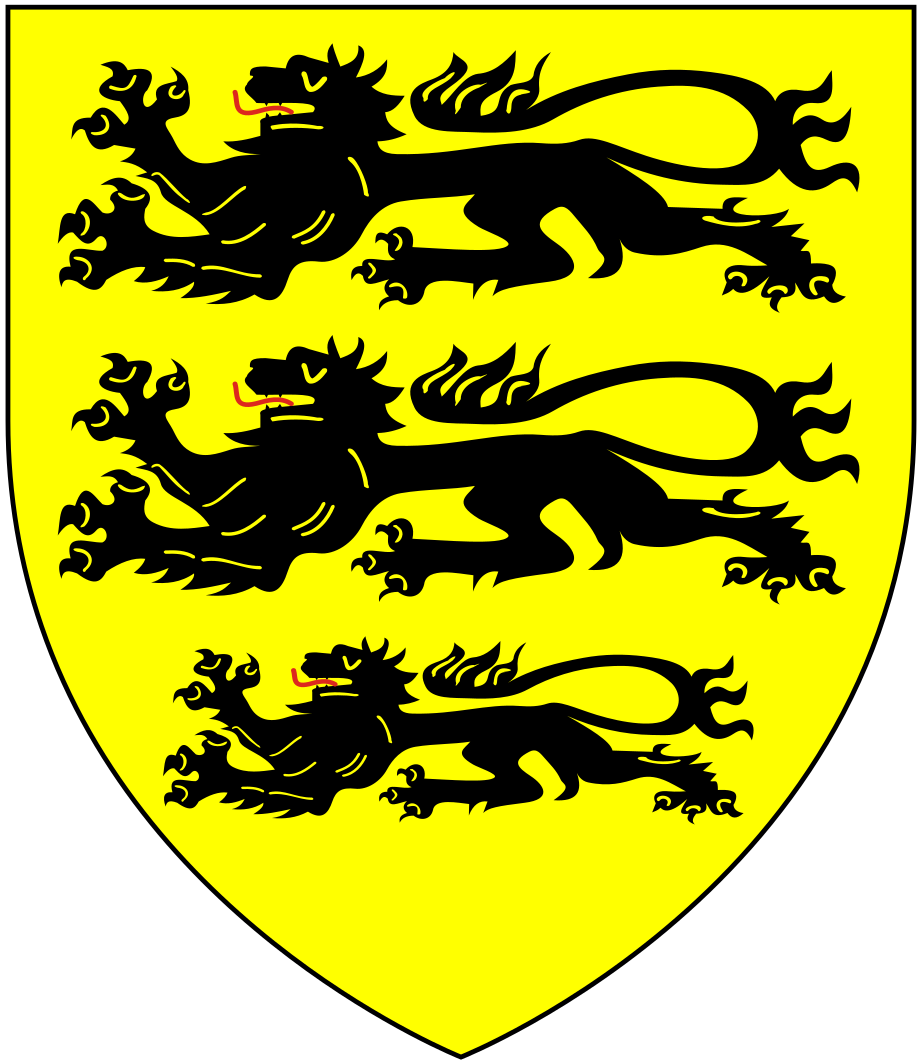
Arms of Carew: Or, three lions passant in pale sable

Sir Peter Carew (1514? – 27 November 1575) of Mohuns Ottery, Luppitt, Devon, was an English adventurer, who served during the reign of Queen Elizabeth I of England and took part in the Tudor conquest of Ireland. His biography was written by his friend and legal adviser, the Devon historian John Hooker (d. 1601).

He is sometimes referred to as Sir Peter Carew the elder, to distinguish him from his first cousin and immediate heir Sir Peter Carew, who was killed at the Battle of Glenmalure in 1580.

== Early life and career ==
Carew was the third son of Sir William Carew, a Devonshire gentleman, and was born at Ottery Mohun (now Mohuns Ottery) in the parish of Luppitt. He attended grammar school in Exeter, where he was a frequent truant, and at St Paul's School. By his own account (set down in his biography) he once climbed a turret on Exeter city wall and threatened to jump if his master came after him. His father then had him led back to his house on a leash, like a dog, and for punishment coupled him to one of his hounds for a time.

Carew was placed in the service of a French friend of his father's, but suffered demotion to muleteer and was only saved in February 1526, when a family relation, on his way to the siege of Pavia in the service of King Francis I of France, heard Carew's companions call the young man by name. On the way to the siege, the relative died and Carew took up with a marquis, who died in battle. Carew later served Philibert, Prince of Orange, after whose death he was sent by Orange's sister to King Henry VIII of England with letters in despatch; the king noted his proficiency in riding and French and took him into service.

Carew went with Lord William Howard to Scotland in 1535 to present James V with the Order of the Garter. It was said that Scottish courtiers observed Carew's manners and fluency in French and assumed he was a french aristocrat. In 1540, Carew travelled with his cousin and visited Constantinople, Venice, Milan and Vienna, where his cousin died.

He served in the war against France on land and at sea. In July 1543, he took part in a team of six in a friendly tournament with French soldiers from the garrison of Thérouanne, organised by John Wallop. In 1544, he led a company of foot apparelled in black at his own expense, with his brother George Carew – who was in command of the Mary Rose when she sank – and served as commander of the horse. For his service in the campaign he was knighted in 1545.

Carew was Member of Parliament in 1545 for Tavistock, in 1547 for Dartmouth, in 1553 and 1559 for Devon and in 1563 for Exeter, having served as High Sheriff of Devon in 1547.

He competed in the tournaments at the coronation of Edward VI, wearing his wife's glove as a favour on his helmet. In June 1549, Carew was despatched by Protector Somerset to help quash the Prayer Book Rebellion (the rising in Devon and Cornwall occasioned by the issue of the reformed Book of Common Prayer); but he was subsequently reprimanded by Somerset for the harshness of his countermeasures, notably the burning of barns at Crediton. He was probably the author of a letter written at the end of July to William Cecil reporting progress.

In 1553, he proclaimed Queen Mary I of England in the west, at Dartmouth and Newton Abbot. However, at the end of that year he conspired (as part of "Wyatt's Rebellion") against her proposed marriage to Philip of Spain. Unlike many of his co-conspirators, he managed to escape arrest, and fled into exile on the European mainland in January 1554. In May 1556 he was arrested with Sir John Cheke in Flanders and returned unceremoniously to England in a fishing boat. He was held in the Tower of London until October 1556, his release being secured on payment of certain family debts due to the Crown.

Under Elizabeth I, Carew was sent to settle a dispute between Lord Grey and the Earl of Norfolk, which had arisen while they were commanding an army against the French in Scotland at the Siege of Leith. When Norfolk was eventually convicted of treason in 1572, he found that Carew was his gaoler, having been appointed Constable of the Tower.

== Ireland ==
In 1568, Carew embarked on his greatest adventure, when he laid claim to lands in the south of Ireland. He had sent ancient documents for examination by John Hooker, who became convinced – after travelling to Ireland – that the documents established Carew's hereditary entitlement to extensive properties in that country. Henry II of England (the first Lord of Ireland, a title assumed in 1172 at the beginning of the Cambro-Norman conquest) had granted half the lordship of Cork to Robert FitzStephen, and Hooker believed that Fitz-Stephen's daughter had married a Carew ancestor. Carew's claim existed by letter of the law contained in antique parchment under crown seal.

Carew obtained leave of the queen to prosecute his claims and sailed for Ireland from Ilfracombe in August 1568. His first proceedings were against Christopher Cheevers for possession of the lordship of Maston in County Meath; Carew claimed he couldn't get a fair trial at common law before a jury and went instead before the lord deputy, Sir Henry Sidney, sitting in council, whereupon Cheevers agreed to a compromise of the claim. Then he secured a decree of Sidney and council for the barony of Idrone in County Carlow, which was then in the possession of the Kavanagh clan, and was appointed captain of Leighlin castle (in succession to Sir Thomas Stukley) in the centre of the barony.

Carew's claim became complicated when it appeared to encroach upon the possession and authority of the Butler family, an Anglo-Norman dynasty with wide influence in Ireland, whose principal was Sir Thomas Butler, 10th Earl of Ormond. Butler's younger brother, Sir Edmund, held the castle of Clogrenan a few miles north of Leighlin – it had been purchased from the Kavanaghs by his father – and in protest at this encroachment, which he expected would extend to his own lands, he launched an attack on Carew, who retaliated by storming Clogrenan and seizing it with little difficulty. The land seizure caused great disquiet locally and eventually led to the Butler Wars, which contributed to a wider insurrection, the first of the Desmond Rebellions.

Carew fought an effective campaign against the Butlers, but their influence overwhelmed his efforts. Not content to pursue the acquisition of Irish lands by right of inheritance, he extended his ambitions with a scheme for plantation. In April 1569, the privy council at London approved in principle a proposal by him, along with Sir Warham St Leger, Sir Humphrey Gilbert and Sir Richard Grenville, for a corporate settlement by confiscation of lands at Baltimore on the coast of the province of Munster (see Plantations of Ireland) to be accomplished via legal proceedings for the purpose of exposing defective titles, expelling rebels and introducing English colonists. Carew's legal adviser, John Hooker, had by then become a prominent New English member (for Athenry) in the Irish Parliament in Dublin.

The ensuing first Desmond Rebellion (1569–73) saw the rebels under James FitzMaurice FitzGerald engaged in bloody conflict along the coast of Munster, besieging the city of Cork, amongst others, with the demand that all efforts at colonisation cease. Both sides laid waste to the hinterland, and it was soon recognised that Carew had reached too far. The Earl of Ormond managed to bring his followers in from their rebellion against the Crown. After the earl's return to court the queen decided to recall Carew to England. Carew returned to Ireland in 1574 having refused the queen's request to retake his seat in parliament. He found Lords Courcy and Barry Oge and the O'Mahons (and others) willing to acknowledge his claims and agree tenancies with him. Once this part of his plans had been settled he ordered a house to be prepared for him at Cork but died of illness on the way, on 27 November 1575, at Ross in County Waterford.

== Legacy ==
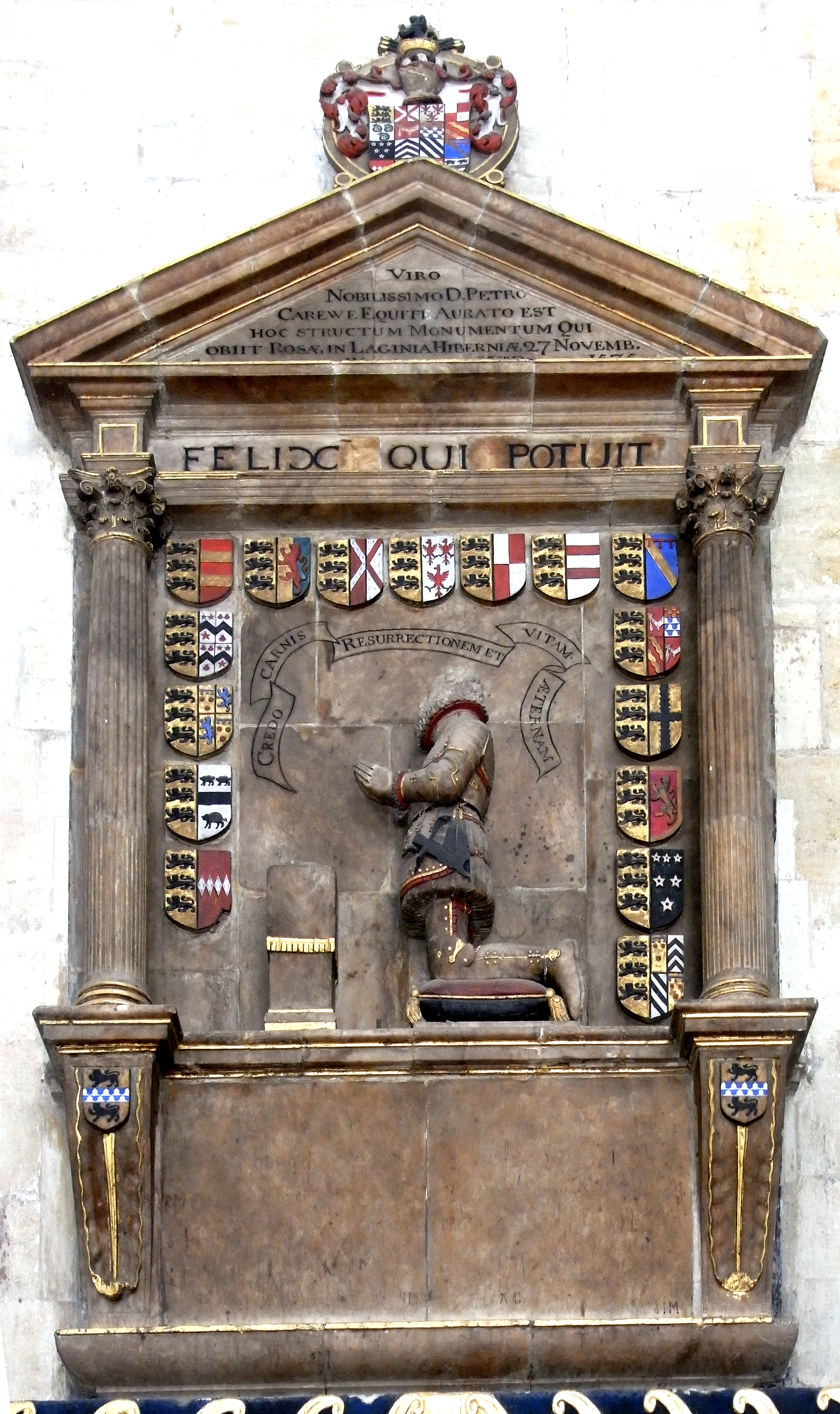
Mural monument to Carew in Exeter Cathedral: erected by John Hooker (d.1601), whose own arms appear on the two console brackets

Carew was buried in Waterford Cathedral, on the south side of the chancel. The cathedral was rebuilt in the 18th century, and nothing remains of his grave. There is, however, a mural monument to him in Exeter Cathedral, erected by John Hooker: it was originally set up in the north choir aisle, but was moved to the south transept in 1805.

His will was dated 4 July 1574, and was proved in February 1576. He had no issue, and his heirs were, in turn, his cousins Peter (d. 1580) and George (1555–1629), afterwards 1st Earl of Totnes.

Two portraits of him by Gerlach Flicke survive: one is in the Royal Collection, and held at Hampton Court Palace; the other is in the Scottish National Gallery.

== Biographies ==
=== By Hooker ===
Carew's biography was written shortly after his death by his legal adviser and friend, John Hooker. This is a remarkably early date for a life of a lay commoner, and the work is described by J.P.D. Cooper as "a milestone in the English biographical genre". The manuscript is now Lambeth Palace Library MS 605.

==== Editions ====
It has been published in three different editions, by Phillipps in 1840, Maclean in 1857, and by Brewer and Buller in 1867. Phillipps' edition adheres to original spelling, whereas the other two editions modernise the spelling. However, Maclean's is generally regarded as the standard edition, and is widely cited by historians.

- "The Life of Sir Peter Carew, of Mohun Ottery, co. Devon", edited by Sir Thomas Phillipps, published in volume 28 of Archaeologia, journal of the Society of Antiquaries of London, in 1840
- With much supplementary material, as The Life and Times of Sir Peter Carew, edited by John Maclean, in 1857
- In the Calendar of the Carew Manuscripts, edited by J. S. Brewer and William Buller, in 1867

=== By Wagner ===
There is a modern full-length biography of Carew by John Wagner (1998).

== Notes ==
Attribution

This article incorporates text from a publication now in the public domain: Martin, Charles Trice (1887). "Carew, Peter". In Stephen, Leslie (ed.). Dictionary of National Biography. Vol. 9. London: Smith, Elder & Co.

== Bibliography ==
- Bagwell, Richard (1885–90). Ireland under the Tudors. London. 3 vols.
- Calendar of State Papers: Ireland
- Brewer, J.S.; Bullen, William, eds. (1867–73). Calendar of the Carew Manuscripts, preserved in the Archiepiscopal Library at Lambeth (1515–1624). London: Longman & Co. 6 vols.
- Canny, Nicholas (1976). The Elizabethan Conquest of Ireland.
- Canny, Nicholas (2002). Kingdom and Colony.
- Cooper, J. P. D. (2008) [2004]. "Carew, Sir Peter (1514?–1575)". Oxford Dictionary of National Biography (online ed.). Oxford University Press. doi:10.1093/ref:odnb/4634. (Subscription, Wikipedia Library access or UK public library membership required.)
- Maclean, Sir John, ed. (1857). The Life and Times of Sir Peter Carew, Kt. London: Bell & Daldy.
- O'Donovan, John, ed. (1851). Annala Rioghachta Éireann: Annals of the Kingdom of Ireland by the Four Masters. Dublin: Hodges and Smith.
- Rowse, A.L. (1987). "Sir Peter Carew, Soldier of Fortune". Court and Country: Studies in Tudor Social History. Brighton: Harvester Press. pp. 102–35. ISBN 0-7108-1147-0.
- Sage, John (2000). Luppitt: Parish, Church and People. Luppitt Local History. ISBN 0-9539483-0-7.
- Wagner, John A. (1998). The Devon Gentleman: A Life of Sir Peter Carew. University of Hull Press. ISBN 0-85958-669-3.
- History of Parliament biography of Carew, Sir Peter (c.1510-75), of Mohun's Ottery, Devon

Honorary titles
Preceded by Sir Thomas Denys	Custos Rotulorum of Devon bef. 1558–1575	Succeeded by Sir Gawain Carew
