= Battle of Glenmalure =

Part of the Second Desmond Rebellion

- Part of the Second Desmond Rebellion
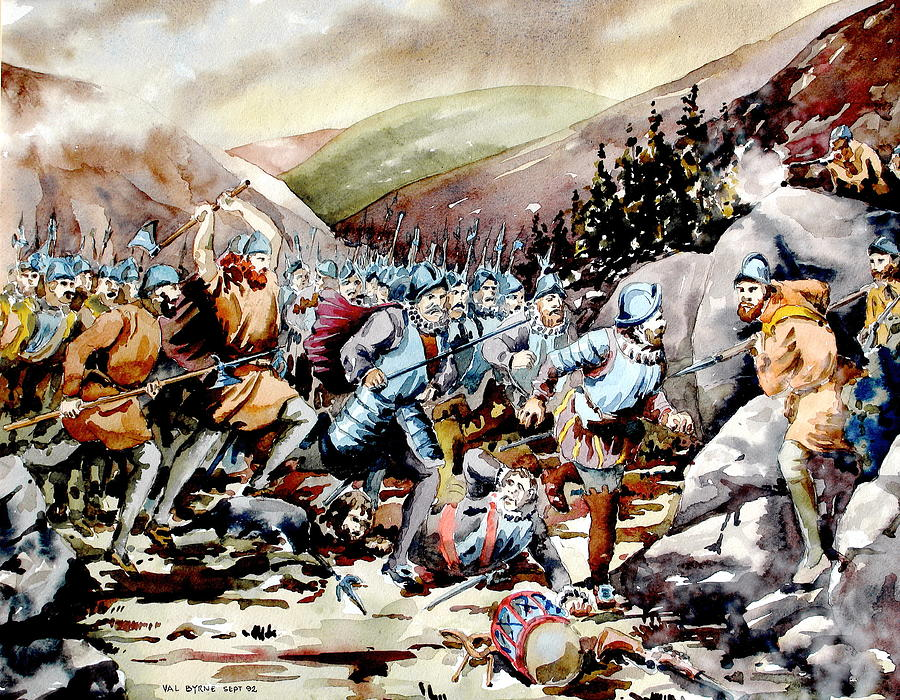
Date	25 August 1580
Location	Glenmalure, County Wicklow, Ireland
Result	Irish victory

Belligerents
Irish of Wicklow, Old English rebels	Kingdom of England

Commanders and leaders
Fiach McHugh O'Byrne, James Eustace, 3rd Viscount Baltinglass	Arthur Grey, 14th Baron Grey de Wilton, Colonel George Moore

Strength
700	>2,000

Casualties and losses
Low	360–800

The Battle of Glenmalure (Irish: Cath Ghleann Molúra) took place in Ireland on 25 August 1580 during the Desmond Rebellions. A Catholic army of united Irish clans from the Wicklow Mountains led by Fiach MacHugh O'Byrne and James Eustace, 3rd Viscount Baltinglass of the Pale, defeated an English army under Arthur Grey, 14th Baron Grey de Wilton, at Clan O'Byrne's mountain stronghold of Glenmalure.

== Background ==
Grey had landed in Ireland with reinforcements from England in mid-August; his total forces numbering over 2,000 men, the largest English army sent to Ireland in decades. The presence of such a large retinue undoubtedly dissuaded many would-be rebels from joining O'Byrne's side. Despite this, Grey was inexperienced in waging war on Irish terrain and had been previously out of active military service for twenty years. Grey had also received little information on how Ireland was to be governed, even after being appointed Lord Deputy, and so his task was seen as a purely military affair.

O'Byrne, Baltinglass, along with their O'Toole allies, simply withdrew in the face of a much larger military force and re-established themselves in Glenmalure. From there, they dispatched a message to Grey seeking protection. However, Grey had been under strict instructions not to give any such protection or pardoning, and perceived this message as indicative of the arrogant behaviour of the Irish rebels.

On 18 August, Grey moved his forces to Naas where he collected guides and made plans to attack the rebels. Grey intended to march around the Wicklow Mountains and thus hit O'Byrne's forces from the south-east. However, when the rebels were nowhere to be found, Grey marched his forces ever deeper into the mountains; the route being dictated by the worsening local terrain that was funneling Grey's men into a narrow valley. By this point, O'Byrne had become fully aware of the English troop movements, largely due to defectors from Grey's Kildare allies and from the large mass of soldiers dressed in scarlet and blue coats rummaging through the narrow path.

== Battle ==
When what appeared to be the vanguard of the Irish rebels presented itself before Grey, he ordered his forces to engage immediately, against the advice of some of his more experienced Kildare allies. They, along with Grey's force of cavalry, occupied a position on a nearby hill and did not play an active role in the subsequent battle. The English vanguard, commanded by Colonel George Moore, pursued the Irish rebels into the glen - a dense valley bisected by a four-mile-long river with steep sides and covered in dense foliage, rising in places as high as 2,000 feet. The English fought an advancing skirmish with the Irish as they were drawn deeper and deeper into the glen, whose terrain by now had become horrendous, marked by rocks, bogs, and wood. In an effort to gain higher and more defensible ground, or possibly believing his troops had become vulnerable to an ambush, Colonel Moore advanced his troops up the northern slope of the glen.

While climbing the steep slopes of the valley, the inexperienced English soldiers were ambushed by the Irish who hid in the woods. The English were sniped at for a long period of time before their discipline collapsed and they turned and fled down the valley. It was at this point that most of their casualties occurred, as the Irish left their cover and fell upon the English with swords, spears, and axes. Dozens of English soldiers were cut down by the pursuing Irish as they tried to escape the field. The remaining English had to fight a rearguard action for several miles until they reached the town of Rathdrum. Only the presence of Grey's cavalry and his rearguard prevented the total annihilation of the English forces.

== Aftermath ==
Irish sources state that around 800 English soldiers were killed. English sources put their losses lower, at 360, though it is possible that the English sources ignored the casualties of their Irish allies. English losses included Peter Carew, cousin of his namesake colonist who had made claims to, and won, large tracts of land in southern Ireland. The remainder of the English force retreated to lowland Wicklow and from there to Dublin. However, the following year, most of the Irish rebel lords, including O'Byrne, accepted terms of surrender offered by the Crown. The exception was Baltinglass, who fled for France.

== In popular culture ==
The battle is commemorated in the folk song "Follow me up to Carlow".

== See also ==
- Irish battles
- History of Ireland

== Bibliography ==
- O’Byrne, Emmett (1998). "The Battle of Glenmalure, 25 August 1580: cause and course". Journal of the Rathdrum Historical Society / Feagh McHugh O'Byrne: The Wicklow Firebrand. 1: 150–80.
- Richard Bagwell, Ireland under the Tudors 3 vols. (London, 1885–1890).
- John O'Donovan (editor), Annals of Ireland by the Four Masters (1851).
- Calendar of State Papers: Carew MSS. i., ii., (6 vols., 1867–1873).
- Nicholas Canny The Elizabethan Conquest of Ireland (1976); Kingdom and Colony (2002).
- Cyril Falls Elizabeth's Irish Wars (1955).
- Richard Berleth "The Twilight Lords" (1994) ISBN 1-56619-598-5
