= Dowrich =

Historic estate in Devon, England

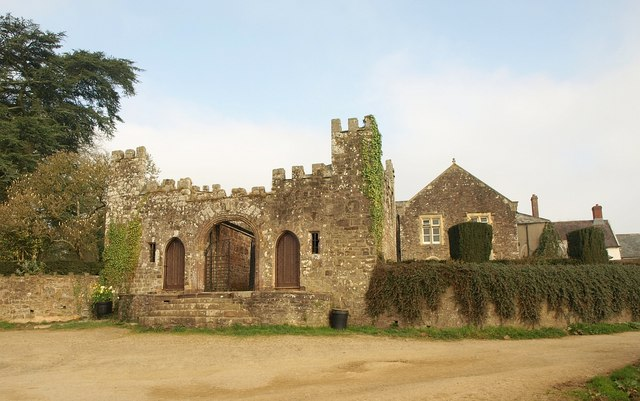
Dowrich, 15th century gatehouse, viewed in 2011

Dowrich (anciently Dowrish) is an historic estate in the parish of Sandford, on the River Creedy, three miles north-east of Crediton in Devon, England. Between the 12th century and 1717 it was the seat of the ancient gentry family of Dowrish (originally de Dowrish) which took its name from the estate where it had become established before the reign of King John (1199–1216), when it built a castle keep on the site. A 15th century gatehouse survives there today, next to the ancient mansion house.

== Mansion house ==
The grade II listed mansion house, known as Dowrich House, is situated on a hill about two miles north-east of Sandford Church. It was described as follows by Polwhele (died 1838):

"To enter the dwelling-house we pass through a building called the Prison, which indeed has all the appearance of one, and tradition says that it was such; for it is reported that the Dowrich family had great powers, and that it was actually a place of confinement for such offenders as were amenable to their jurisdiction. At the foot of the hill which we ascend to the house is a small brook with a bridge over it, and it is said that whatever criminal passed that bridge in his way from Dowrich House to the County Goal was sure to be hanged. Nothing remarkable is to be discovered in the house except a few very ancient family portraits and many armorial bearings of the intermarriages with some of the first families, the arms of whom are painted in the panels of the wainscoting of the drawing-room. The prospect from the house is extensive and very beautiful".

== Descent ==
The estate of Dowrich formed part of the vast manor of Crediton, the lord of which both before and after the Norman Conquest of 1066 was the Bishop of Exeter, whose earlier cathedra was the See of Crediton. Of the many separate estates granted by the early bishops within the manor of Crediton, one was recorded in the Cartae Baronum of 1166 as held as one knight's fee by William de Tracy (d. post-1172), feudal baron of Bradninch in Devon. This single estate was divided at some time into a further four, one of which was Dowrich, held as an eighth of a knight's fee by a tenant or follower of the lords of Bradninch, who took his name "de Dowrich" from his estate. Dowrich continued to be held from the feudal barony of Bradninch until 1352 and possibly later.

=== Dowrish ===
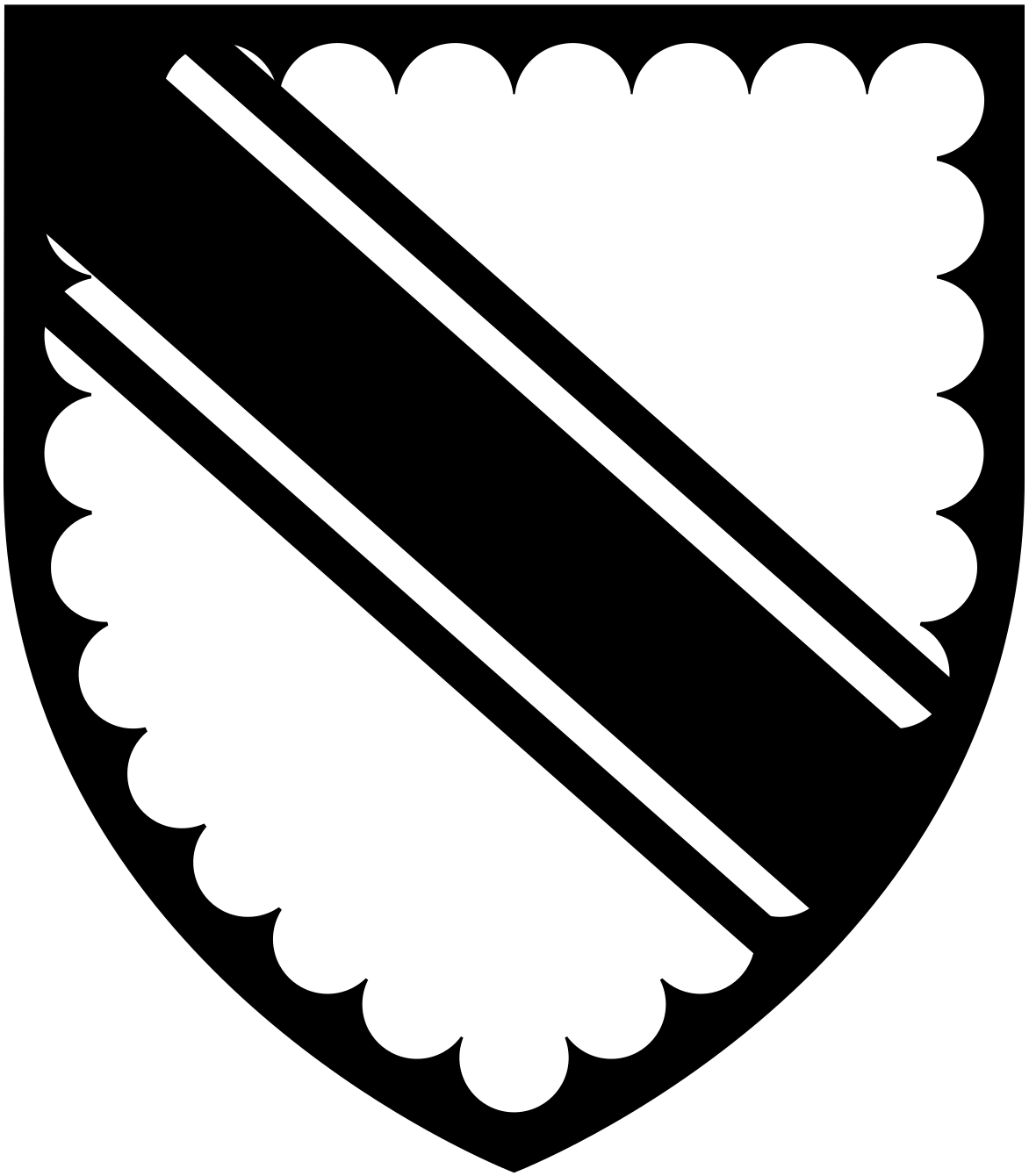
Arms of Dowrish: Argent a bend cotised sable a bordure engrailed of the last

The descent of the estate in the Dowrish family, called by Prince (died 1723) "A very ancient and gentile family", was as follows, as recorded in the Heraldic Visitations of Devon:

==== 12th to 14th centuries ====
- .... Dowrish, a man whose first name is not recorded, who built a castle keep on the site during the reign of King John (1199–1216).
- Walter Dowrish, son.
- Nicholas Dowrish (fl. 1256), son.
- William Dowrish, son, who held Dowrish in 1302 as 1/8 of a knight's fee.
- Thomas Dowrish (fl.1315), son, who married Elinora de Helion, a daughter and co-heiress of Robert de Helion, who obtained as her share of the paternal inheritance the manor of Upton Helion, near Crediton.
- William Dowrish (fl.1327), son.
- John Dowrish (fl.1335), son.
- William Dowrish (fl.1340), son.
- Thomas Dowrish (fl.1366), son.
- Thomas Dowrish (fl.1389), son.

==== Richard Dowrish (fl.1413) ====
Richard Dowrish (fl.1413), son of Thomas Dowrish (fl.1389). A chantry in Crediton Church was established by nine men resident near Crediton which provided an endowment to the Canons of Crediton to find a priest to sing daily mass for the soul of Sir John Sully (c.1283 – c.1388), KG, of Ruxford in the parish of Sandford, near Crediton and of Iddesleigh in Devonshire. One of these contributors was recorded in 1408 as Richard Dowrich.

==== Thomas Dowrish (fl.1439) ====
Thomas Dowrish (fl.1439), son.

==== Thomas Dowrish (died 1464/79) ====
Thomas Dowrish (died 1464/79), son, Recorder of Exeter from 1468 to 1479, who married Alice Fulford, whose father is not recorded in the pedigree of Fulford of Fulford in Devon, into which family her son certainly married. In 1470 he complimented King Edward IV (1461–1483) in a speech after that king had entered the City of Exeter in pursuit of the Duke of Clarence.

==== Richard Dowrish (fl.1483) ====
Richard Dowrish (fl.1483), son, who married twice, firstly to a member of the Catsby family, secondly to Joan Fulford (died 1512), a daughter of Sir Thomas Fulford (died 1489) of Fulford in Devon, by his wife Phillipa Courtenay, a daughter of Sir Philip Courtenay (died 1463) of Powderham (by his wife Elizabeth Hungerford, daughter of Walter Hungerford, 1st Baron Hungerford (died 1449), KG). His daughter Katherine Dowrish, by his second wife, married John Sneddall and received from her father as her marriage portion the manor of Upton Helion.

==== Thomas Dowrish (died 1552) ====
Thomas Dowrish (died 1552), son by father's first marriage, who married Elizabeth Taverner, daughter of Sir John Taverner of Oxfordshire.

==== Thomas Dowrish (1522–1590) ====
Thomas Dowrish (1522–1590), eldest son and heir, who married Anne Farringdon, daughter of Charles Farringdon lord of the manor of Farringdon, near Clyst St Mary, Devon, by his wife Margery Stukeley, daughter of Sir Thomas Stukeley (1473–1542) lord of the Affeton, Devon, Sheriff of Devon in 1521. His children included:

  - Walter Dowrish, eldest son and heir, see below.
  - Rev. Hugh Dowrish, second son, Rector of Lapford and Honiton, whose wife was Anne Edgecombe (born before 1560–1596) a poet and historian, a daughter of Sir Richard Edgecombe of Mount Edgcumbe in Cornwall. A small painted heraldic escutcheon representing this marriage survives, among other similar ones, on the wooden cornice in the hall of Dowrich House, and shows the arms of Dowrich (Argent, a bend cotised sable a bordure engrailed of the last) impaling Edgcumbe (Gules, on a bend ermine cottised or three boar's heads couped argent).
  - Elizabeth Dowrish (died 1587), the wife of John Northcote (died 1587) of Crediton and mother of John Northcote (1570–1632) of Uton and Hayne, Newton St Cyres, near Crediton, lord of the manor of Newton St Cyres, whose splendid life-size standing effigy and monument survives in Newton St Cyres Church. Either he or his identically named son (Sir John Northcote, 1st Baronet (1599–1676), ancestor of the Earls of Iddesleigh) was Sheriff of Devon in 1626.

==== Walter Dowrish ====
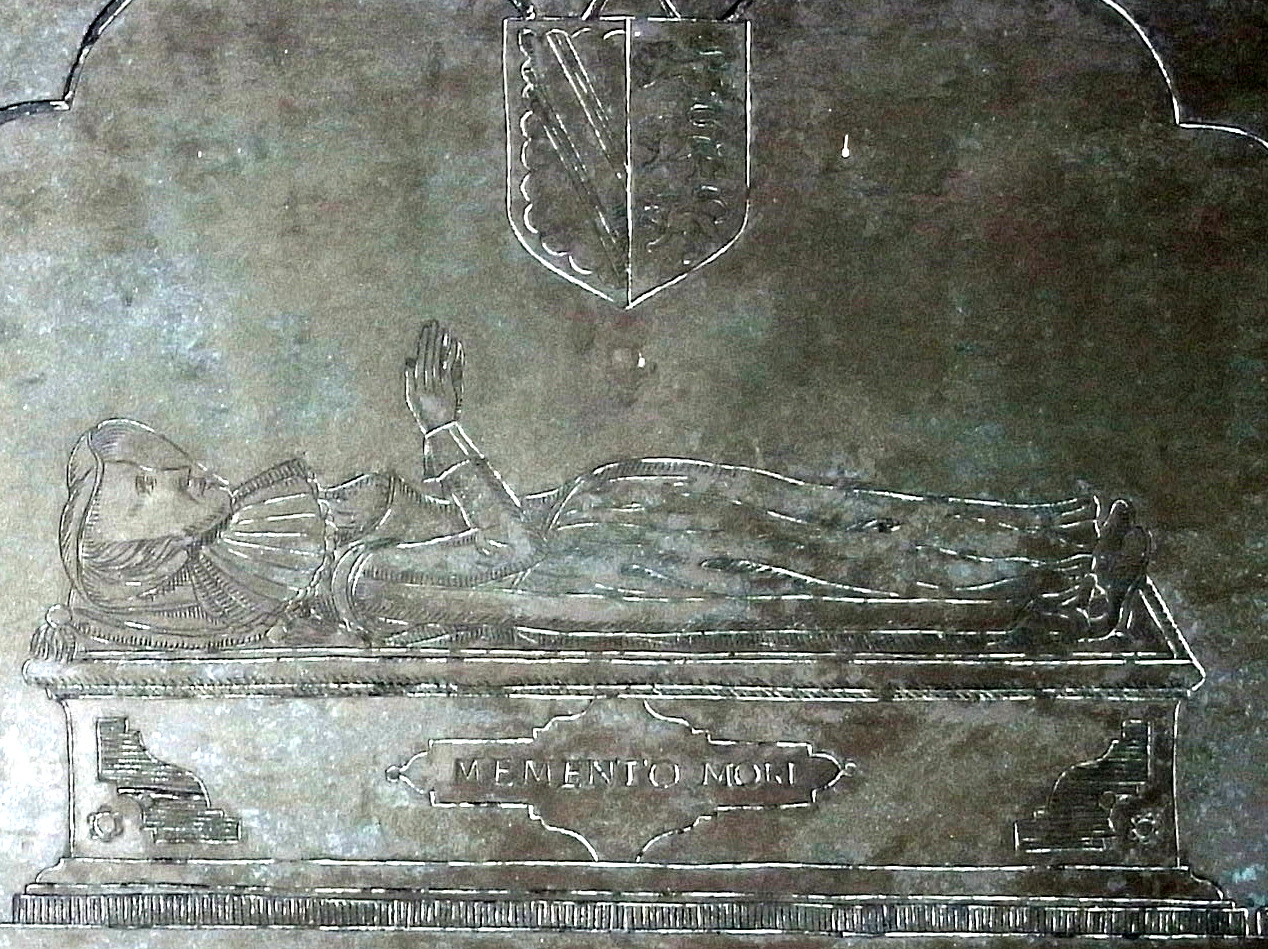
Mary Carew (died 1604), wife of Walter Dowrish, detail from her monumental brass in Sandford Church

Walter Dowrish, eldest son and heir, who married Mary Carew (1550–1604), daughter of Dr. George Carew, Dean of Windsor, third son of Sir Edmund Carew, Baron Carew, of Mohuns Ottery in the parish of Luppitt, Devon, by his wife Catharine Huddesfield, a daughter and co-heiress of Sir William Huddesfield (died 1499) of Shillingford St George in Devon, Attorney General for England and Wales to Kings Edward IV (1461–1483) and Henry VII (1485–1509). Mary's younger brother was George Carew, 1st Earl of Totnes (1555–1629)and her elder brother was Sir Peter Carew (died 1580), who was killed in Ireland. The extravagant monument dated 1589 with effigy of Sir Peter Carew (died 1581) and of his uncle Sir Gawen Carew (died 1585) in Exeter Cathedral includes the following inscription on three sides of the cornice: "Walter Dowrich of Dowrich Esq., married the only sister of this Sir Peter Carew, Knyght, under figured, elder brother to the Lord Carew of Clopton which Sir Peter Carew, Knyght, was slayne in Ireland". By his wife he had one son and three daughters as follows:

- Thomas Dowrish (1568–1628), only son and heir, who married Katherine Stukely, eldest daughter of John Stukely (1551–1611), lord of the Affeton, Devon. (see below)
- Dorothy Dowrish, the wife of Thomas Peyton, Customer of Plymouth, the second son of Thomas Peyton of St Edmundsbury in Suffolk (a junior member of the ancient Peyton family of Peyton Hall, Boxford, Suffolk, descended from Thomas Peyton (1418–1484), twice Sheriff of Cambridgeshire and Huntingdonshire (1443 & 1453) who rebuilt the church of St Andrew's in Isleham, in the chancel of which survives his monumental brass) by his wife Lady Cecilia Bourchier, a daughter of John Bourchier, 2nd Earl of Bath (1499–1561) of Tawstock in Devon. Thomas Peyton's elder brother was Sir Henry Peyton who married Lady Mary Seymour, a daughter of Edward Seymour, 1st Duke of Somerset, KG, (c. 1500 – 1552) Lord Protector of England from 1547 until 1549 during the minority of his nephew, King Edward VI (1547–1553) and the eldest brother of Queen Jane Seymour (died 1537), the third wife of King Henry VIII.
- Elizabeth Dowrish, wife of George Trobridge (1564–1631) of Trobridge, near Crediton.
- Margaret Dowrish, wife of William Limesey formerly of Ifield in Kent and later of Colby in Norfolk, which latter manor in 1594 belonged to Sir George Carew and Thomas Hitchcock. The manor of Ifield, later called Hever Court, was acquired by the marriage of John Lymsey to Rose Rikhill, sole heiress of John Rikhill of Ifield. His descendant Edmund Lymsey was granted possession of it in 1548 and sold it to Sir John Rainsford. He was apparently descended from Ralph de Limesy (fl.1066) an Anglo-Norman magnate and a tenant-in-chief in England of King William the Conqueror.

===== Monument to wife =====
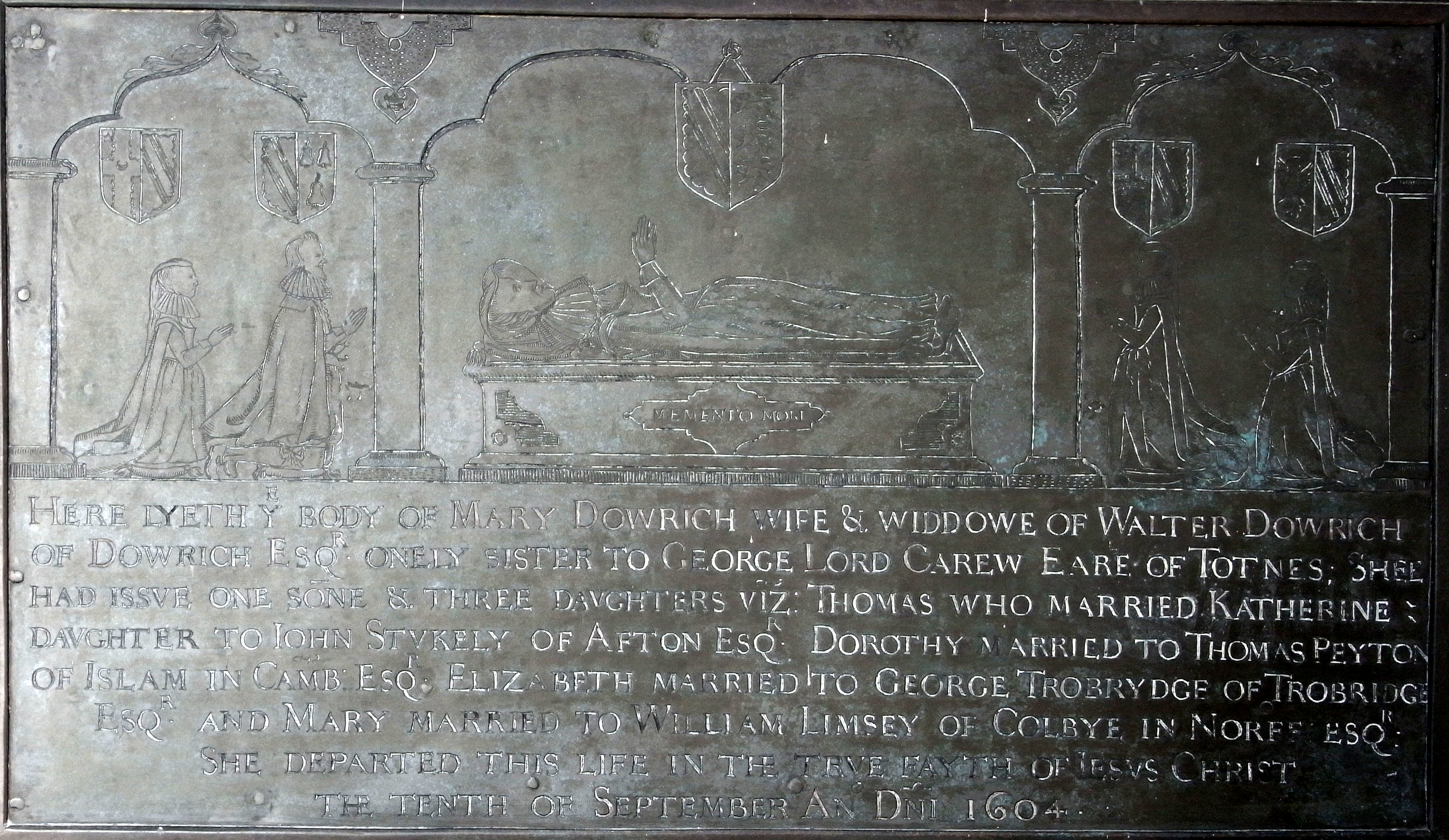
Monumental brass to Mary Carew (died 1604), Sandford Church. The 19th century brass frame decorated with heraldry of the Dowrish family is not shown

The elaborate monumental brass to Mary Carew (died 1604) survives in Sandford Church, Devon, having been removed in the 19th century from its original position in the church where it had suffered much wear, especially on the right side, and was restored in the 19th century by descendants of the Dowrish family and replaced on the north wall of the church, framed in a new brass frame decorated with heraldry of the Dowrich family. The original brass is in three sections, comprising an arcade of three arches; under the central arch is a recumbent effigy of the deceased lying on a chest tomb, fully dressed with ruff collar and hands together in prayer. On the chest tomb is inscribed Memento Mori; above her is an escutcheon showing Dowrish (Argent, a bend cotised sable a bordure engrailed of the last) impaling Carew (Or, three lions passant sable). Under the two flanking arches are kneeling effigies of her one son and three daughters: under the left arch is shown her only son and heir Thomas Dowrish (1568–1628), with above him the arms of Dowrish impaling Stucley (Azure, three pears pendant or), and kneeling behind him his sister Dorothy Dowrish, the wife of Thomas Peyton, with above her an escutcheon showing Peyton (Sable, a cross engrailed or a mullet in the first quarter argent a crescent for difference) impaling Dowrish. On the right of Mary Carew are shown her two other daughters, both kneeling, firstly Elizabeth Dowrish, wife of George Trobridge (1564–1631) of Trobridge, near Crediton, above whom is shown an escutcheon showing the canting arms of Trobridge (Argent, a bridge gules arched with a flag on the top) (also shown in the modern heraldic window in Crediton Parish Church) impaling Dowrish. The third daughter who kneels behind Elizabeth is Margaret Dowrish, wife of William Limesey of Colby in Norfolk above whom is shown an escutcheon showing an eagle displayed (Limesey). Below is the following inscription:

"Here lyeth y^{e} body of Mary Dowrich wife & widdowe of Walter Dowrich of Dowrich Esq^{r} onely sister to George Lord Carew, Ear^{l}e of Totnes. Shee had issue one so(n)ne & three daughters viz: Thomas who married Katherine daughter to John Stukely of Afton, Esq^{r}; Dorothy married to Thomas Peyton of Islam in Camb. Esq^{r}; Elizabeth married to George Trobrydge of Trobridge Esq^{r} and Mary married to William Limsey of Colbye in Norff. Esq.^{r} She departed this life in the true fayth of Jesus Christ the tenth of September An. Dni 1604"

==== Thomas Dowrish (1568–1628) ====
Thomas Dowrish (1568–1628), eldest son and heir, who was mentioned by Risdon (died 1640) in his text on Dowrish. He married Katherine Stukely, eldest daughter of John Stukely (1551–1611), lord of the Affeton, Devon, by his first wife Frances St Leger, daughter of Sir John St Leger (died 1596), of Annery in the parish of Monkleigh, Devon, Sheriff of Devon in 1560, Member of Parliament for Dartmouth, Devon, in 1555–1558, Devon in 1559–1563, Arundel, Sussex, in 1563–1571, Devon again in 1571–1583 and Tregony, Cornwall in 1584–1585. His second son was Lt-Col. Thomas Dowrish, a Parliamentarian commander in the Civil War, who died childless, having written his will in 1652.

==== John Dowrish (born 1593) ====
John Dowrish (born 1593), eldest son and heir, who was "a traveller in divers countries" and in 1612 matriculated at Exeter College, Oxford, a favorite college for sons of the Devonshire gentry. In 1625 or 1626 he married Elizabeth Walker, daughter of Thomas Walker, ancestor of John Walker (1674–1747) of Exeter, author of Sufferings of the Clergy (1714). Thomas Walker founded the Exeter Grammar School, of which Elizabeth was a benefactress. He died childless.

==== Lewis Dowish (1602-1668) ====
Lewis Dowish (1602–1668) (brother, third son of Thomas Dowrish (1568–1628)), who inherited Dowish on the death of both his elder brothers without children. In 1627 he married Anne Davie (1604–1671), a daughter of Emanuel Davie (fl.1617) of Sandford, second son of Gilbert Davie (died 1582) of Canonteign, Devon, second son of Robert Davie (died 1570) of Crediton, a wealthy clothier who founded the very locally prominent Davie family. Two of Gilbert's brothers acquired estates in the parish of Sandford, namely Ruxford and Creedy. He had six sons and six daughters, most of whom died childless.

==== Lewis Dowrish (1638–1689) ====
Lewis Dowrish (1638–1689), third and eldest surviving son and heir, who married twice:

  - Firstly in 1657 to Frances Jacobb (died 1671) of Tavistock, by whom he had four sons and four daughters all of whom either died young or without children of their own.
  - Secondly in 1676 he married Agnes Palmer(died 1705) of Hereford, by whom he had four sons all of whom died childless.

==== Lewis Dowrish (1677–1717) ====
Lewis Dowrish (1677–1717), eldest son and heir, the last in the male line of Dowrish. He married Elizabeth Clarke, daughter of "Thomas Clarke of Hertford", possibly Sir Thomas Clarke (c. 1672 – 1754), of Brickendon, Hertfordshire, three times Member of Parliament for Hertford. He was killed by a fall from his horse at Dowrich Bridge and was buried on 17 September 1717. He left no children.

===== Ghost legend =====
A legend developed locally that the ghost of Lewis Dowrish (1677–1717) haunts the vicinity, as was reported in 1877 as follows:

"At this bridge the last of the Dowriches, returning home late on a winter's (sic) night after a considerable consumption of brandy-punch at the house of a neighbouring squire, fell from his horse and was killed. From that time his spirit has been gradually advancing up the hill towards the house at the rate of a cock-stride in every moon. But he may not use the road. A bridge as narrow and as sharp as the edge of a sword, unrolling itself as he advances, is provided for the unfortunate squire. Whenever he falls off (and it is supposed this must frequently happen) he is obliged to return to the stream where his life ended and to begin again. His present position is therefore quite uncertain, but there is no doubt that he will one day reach his own front door, and what will then happen no one can foresee".

Villagers are reported to have forbidden Paul Low, a later owner of Dowrich, from building an extra step before the steps up to threshold of the gatehouse, which was very high and inconvenient. The reason given was that "the cock would be able to get up". Another rendering of the legend is that Lewis Dowrish was cursed by one of his tenants, an old woman whom he had turned out of her cottage, who wished him to "die by drowning, afterwards returning to the house by cock's steps". Paul Low furthermore reported that villagers of East Village told him they had seen "The Wicked Dowrich's eyes glaring at them from the brook". The step up to the Gatehouse remained high until 1973 when the new owner Mr C. Godfrey, wishing to form a more convenient access to the house, knocked down a section of the wall at the side of the Gatehouse to allow a driveway to pass through. It was shortly after this gap had been made that his gardener reported seeing, in broad daylight and for the duration of 5 to 8 seconds, the ghost of a man wearing a long black coat, holding in his hand a silver-shafted hunting-crop, mounted on a black horse. Similar Devonshire legends concerning ghosts advancing in "cock strides" exist in relation to Otterton Vicarage and to Squire Fry of Yarty.

=== Challis ===
By his will Lewis Dowrish (1677–1717) devised the estate to his widow, Elizabeth Clarke, who in 1719 remarried to Charles Challis (died 1745), a lawyer of Lyon's Inn, and of Ugborough, Devon, who survived his wife and by his will devised Dowrish to his daughter, Mary Challis (died 1774), the wife of John Lock, lord of the manor of Boddington in Gloucestershire.

=== Morgan ===
==== Arabella Morgan (1741–1828) ====
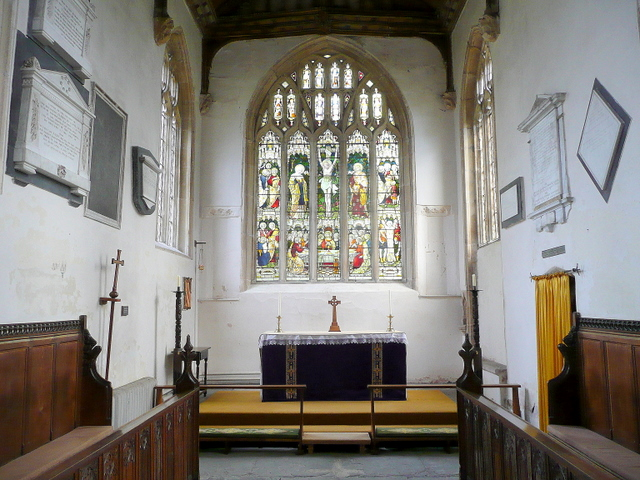
"Handsome marble monument" to Rev. Charles Morgan (1715–1772), Rector of High Ham in Somerset, south wall (right) of the chancel of St Andrew's Church, High Ham (two monuments, one pedimented and the lozenge shaped one to Arabella Morgan (1741–1828))

Mary Challis (Mrs Lock) died childless in 1774, and according to Lysons (1822), bequeathed a life interest in Dowrish to "two maiden ladies of the name of Pitt". In the time of Polwhele (died 1838), Dowrich was the property of "Mrs Pitts in the Circus, Exeter", that is "Bedford Circus", built between 1773 and 1825, demolished in World War II. After the decease of the survivor, which happened in 1792, Mary Challis had specified in her will that the freehold tenure should pass to Arabella Morgan (1741–1828), who accordingly was residing at Dowrish House in 1822. The bequest included Dowrich House and Barton and the estate corn-mill (which latter Mary Challis had purchased from Mr. Hippisley-Coxe of Ston Easton, Somerset, who had acquired the same as his share of the estate of his ancestor, Sir John Davie, Baronet, of Creedy). Arabella Morgan (1741–1828) was the younger of the two daughters and co-heiresses of Rev. Charles Morgan (1715–1772), Rector of High Ham in Somerset, whose "handsome marble monument" survives on the south wall of the chancel of St Andrew's Church, High Ham. Charles Morgan married Jane Rolle (1709–1742), only child of Rev. Dennis Rolle (born 1670) by his wife Arabella Tucker (1663–1744). Rev. Dennis Rolle was a member of the prominent and very wealthy Rolle family of Devon, being a younger brother of Samuel Rolle (1669–1735) of Hudscott, Chittlehampton, Devon, MP for Barnstaple between 1705 and 1708. Both were sons of Dennis Rolle (died 1671) of Great Torrington, a lawyer of the Inner Temple, son of Sir Samuel Rolle (died 1647), MP, one of three distinguished grandsons (his brothers were Henry Rolle (died 1656) Chief Justice of the King's Bench & John Rolle (died 1648), MP) of Henry Rolle of Heanton Satchville, Petrockstowe, fourth son of the founder of the Devonshire Rolles, George Rolle (died 1552), MP, of Stevenstone.

=== Clayfield ===
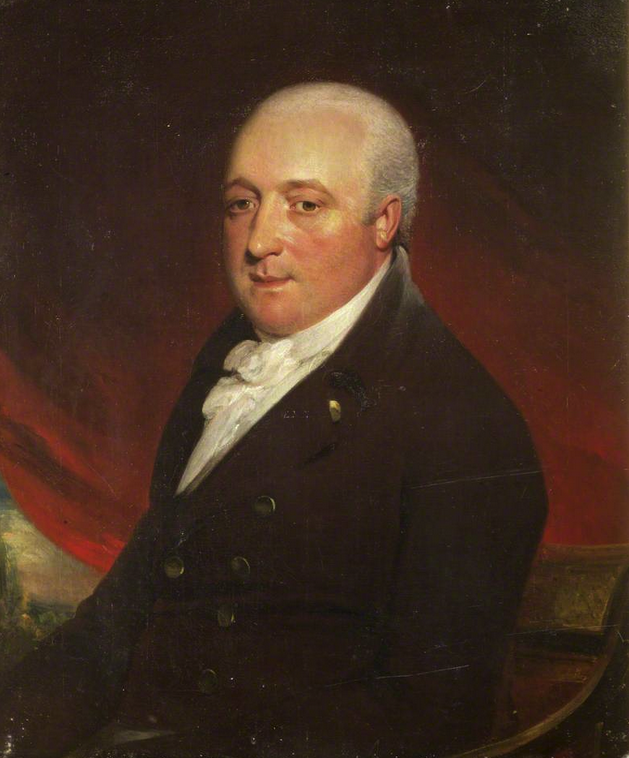
Edward Rolle Clayfield (1767–1825), 1803 portrait by William Armfield Hobday (1771–1831), Bristol Central Library

==== Captain Edward Ireland Clayfield (died 1862) ====
Dowrich House "with a large estate" belonged in 1850 to E.I. Clayfield, Esq., who resided there, according to White's Devonshire Directory of that year. Rev. Charles Morgan had two daughters by his wife Jane Rolle, of whom the elder one, Mary Morgan (1739–1798) married Michael Clayfield (1732–1787), a merchant from Bristol. The younger daughter was Arabella Morgan (1741–1828) who died unmarried in 1828 aged 87, and upon her decease the property devised by Mary Challis passed to her great-nephew, Captain Edward Ireland Clayfield (died 1862), elder son of Edward Rolle Clayfield (1767–1825) (second son of Michael Clayfield (1732–1787) by his wife Mary Morgan), a sugar and wine merchant (a partner in "Ames, Wright, Clayfield and Co", sugar merchants and "Wright, Clayfield and Co", wine importers) and director of the Bristol Dock Company, of Host Street, Bristol and of Brislington, Somerset, a Justice of the Peace for Somerset. An 1803 portrait of Edward Rolle Clayfield by William Armfield Hobday (1771–1831) survives on display in Bristol Central Library. During the Napoleonic War one of his partners Mr Gayner, of Bristol, who resided at La Selva, and afterwards at the Bay of Rosas, was imprisoned in Spain and charged with giving information to the English. He had long supplied Nelson's ships in the Mediterranean with Spanish provisions. In January 1805 Clayfield wrote to Admiral Nelson in an attempt to have his partner released and received the following "characteristically brief" reply from Nelson, on board HMS Victory, dated 30 March 1805, six months before the Battle of Trafalgar:

Sir, I have received your letter of Jany 21st respecting Mr Gayner although I have not heard of him since the War with Spain, I have not the smallest idea of his being put in prison, and his conduct creates such an universal esteem that I have no doubt but that he is both at liberty and respected. I am Sir Your Most Obedient Servant, Nelson and Bronte"

Edward Rolle Clayfield married Frances-Constance Ireland (died 1812), the elder of the two daughters and co-heiresses of James Ireland of Brislington Hall in the parish of Brislington in Somerset, Sheriff of Somerset in 1782, also a wealthy sugar and wine merchant whose inscribed monument survives in Brislington Church. James Ireland's wife was Frances Godde, one of the wealthiest heiresses of the time and a friend of John Wesley. Edward Rolle Clayfield's younger son James Ireland Clayfield (died 1864), inherited Brislington Hall from his maternal grandfather James Ireland, on condition that he should adopt the additional surname and arms of Ireland (Gules, three fleurs-de-lis argent each charged with a goutte-de-sang on a chief indented of the second a lion passant of the field between two torteaux), which he duly performed by royal licence dated 11 May 1827. James Ireland Clayfield-Ireland (died 1864) married Letitia Priaulx (died 1886), youngest daughter and eventual co-heiress of Thomas Priaulx of Montville House in Guernsey. Edward Ireland Clayfield died childless in 1862, when his heir to Dowish became his younger nephew Thomas Priaulx Clayfield-Ireland (died 1872).

==== Thomas Priaulx Clayfield-Ireland (died 1872) ====
Thomas Priaulx Clayfield-Ireland (died 1872), nephew, second son of James Ireland Clayfield-Ireland (died 1864), JP, DL, of Brislington Hall, Somerset. He inherited Dowrich from his childless uncle Captain Edward Ireland Clayfield (died 1862). Thomas Priaulx Clayfield-Ireland (died 1872) was listed in the London Gazette (3 May 1872, p. 2173) as of Dowrich, Brislington Hall and 7 Piccadilly. His executor was his brother Arthur Clayfield-Ireland (1839–1915) ("second surviving son of the late James Ireland Clayfield-Ireland, Esq., JP, DL")

==== Arthur Clayfield-Ireland (1839–1915) ====
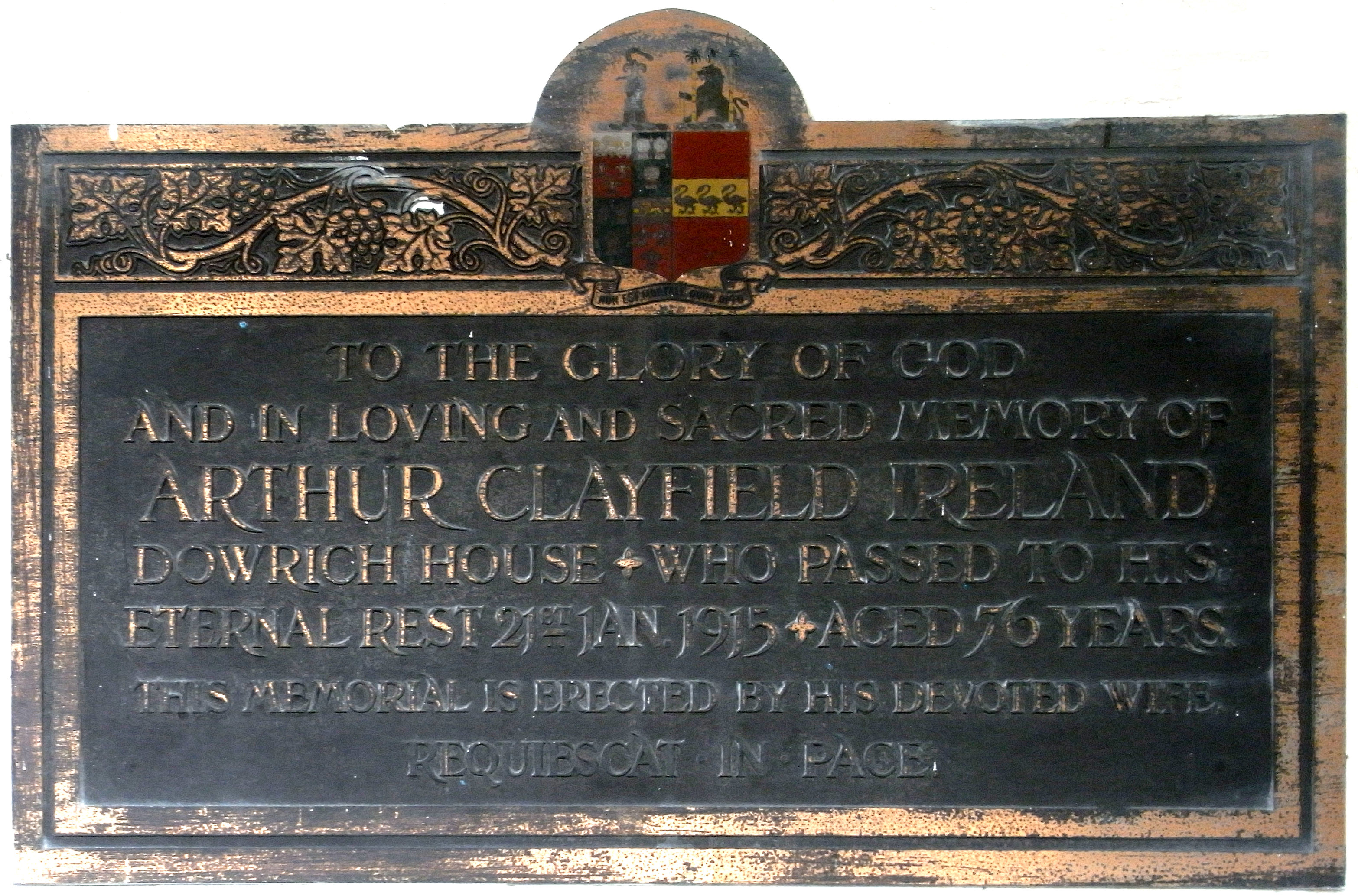
Brass memorial tablet to Arthur Clayfield-Ireland (1839–1915), Sandford Church

Arthur Clayfield-Ireland (1839–1915), younger brother, who was bequeathed Dowrich by his elder brother Thomas Priaulx Clayfield-Ireland (died 1872). According to the Comprehensive Gazetteer of England and Wales, 1894-5, in 1894/5 Dowrich still belonged to the Clayfield family which resided there, when the house still contained portraits of the Dowrish family. Arthur purchased from the Crediton Charity Trustees a small estate called Rookwood, adjoining Dowrich, and which was once part of the Dowrich estate, having in the year 1621 been conveyed by Thomas and John Dowrich to trustees for the poor of Crediton. Arthur also owned the estates of East Burridge and Yelland. In 1902 Arthur was a Justice of the Peace for Devon.

On 29 April 1880 at Froyle Church, near Alton, Hampshire, Arthur married Mary Anne Emily Pitman (living at Dowrich in 1919), daughter of Capt. William Pitman, Royal Navy. Arthur died childless. His Brass memorial tablet survives in Sandford Church, inscribed as follows:

"To the glory of God and in loving and sacred memory of Arthur Clayfield Ireland, Dowrich House, who passed to his eternal rest 21st Jan. 1915 aged 76 years. This memorial is erected by his devoted wife. Requiescat in Pace".

The escutcheon above shows the following arms: Quarterly of 4: 1st & 4th: Gules, three fleurs-de-lis argent each charged with a goutte-de-sang on a chief indented of the second a lion passant of the field between two torteaux(Ireland); 2nd & 3rd: Vert guttee d'or, three garbs erminois banded gules (Clayfield) impaling: Gules, on a fess or three swans passant sable (Pitman).

== Card table ==
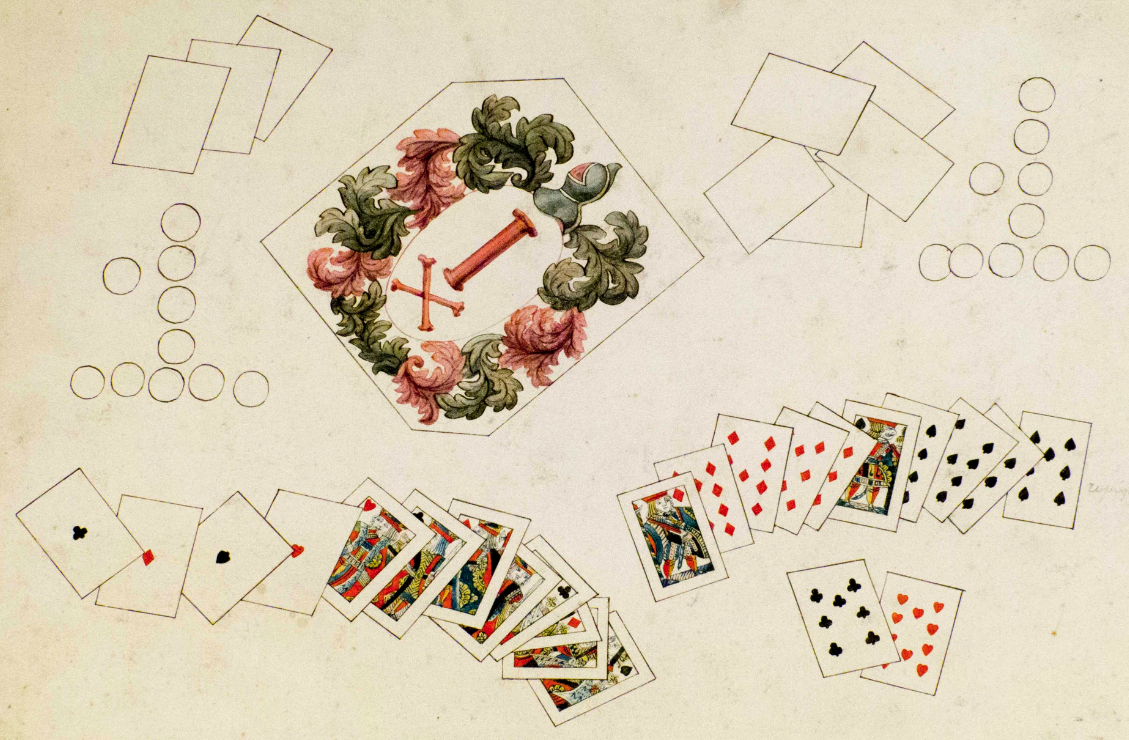
1855 drawing of the top of an inlaid table depicting two hands of a game of piquet on which the manor of Kennersleigh was lost by Thomas Dowrich in the 17th century. The losing hand is that at left, four aces, four kings, and four queens. Collection of National Trust, Saltram House

A table inlaid with marble formerly existed in Dowrich House, depicting the cards of two hands of a game of piquet. The cards are inlaid in the surface of the table, the white portion of the cards being inlaid in Carrara marble. A tradition relates that in the 17th century whilst playing this game with his cousin Northcote, Thomas Dowrish gambled away the manor of Kennersleigh, near Crediton. The table was possibly intended as a warning to future heirs of Dowrish not to gamble. Polwhele, however, in his "History of Devon" states that "Thomas Dowrich" of Dowrich purchased the manor of Kennerleigh, and that his grandson "Thomas Dowrich" sold it to John Northcote. A drawing of this table, made in 1855 probably for Edward Ireland Clayfield (died 1862) of Dowrish, survives in the collection of Saltram House, Devon (National Trust), with written commentary. Sabine Baring-Gould gives a full description of the hands played in the game in his 1898 book An Old English Home and its Dependencies:

"Mr. Dowrish, being eldest hand, held the four aces, four kings, and four queens, and promptly offered to bet his manor of Kennerleigh against £500, by no means its value even in those days, that he won the game. Sir Arthur took the bet, having a claim of carte blanche on his undiscarded hand. After Sir Arthur had discarded, he took up two knaves, and held two points of five each, each headed by the knave. Mr. Dowrish being about to declare, was stopped by Sir Arthur's claim for ten for carte blanche, which ruined his chances. The point fell to Sir Arthur, and two quints".

An eye-witness account, dated 1848, of seeing the table, is recorded as follows:

In the year 1848 I was staying with a friend at Kennerleigh, who knowing I was fond of old places and old things, took me to Dowrish House, belonging to Captain Clayfield, built in the time of King John, the centre only remaining. It is approached through a gate-house. Mrs. Clayfield showed us some portraits of the Dowrish family, and a marble table inlaid with cards and counters, showing the two hands of Piquet held by Mr. Dowrish and an ancestor of the present Sir Stafford Northcote who were playing together, when Mr. Dowrish, thinking he had won the game, betted the Manor of Kennerleigh, and lost it. The Northcotes hold it (i.e. Manor of Kennerleigh) at the present time. The marble table was made to commemorate this event.

The card table was included in the auction of the "furnishings, oil paintings and effects" held at Dowrich on 16 September 1921 and was purchased by Walter Northcote, 2nd Earl of Iddesleigh (1845–1927), of Pynes near Crediton, the descendant of the winner of the cardgame.

== Sources ==
- Vivian, Lt.Col. J.L., (Ed.) The Visitations of the County of Devon: Comprising the Heralds' Visitations of 1531, 1564 & 1620, Exeter, 1895, pp. 289–91, pedigree of "Dowrish of Dowrish"
