= Ruxford =

Historic estate in Devon, England

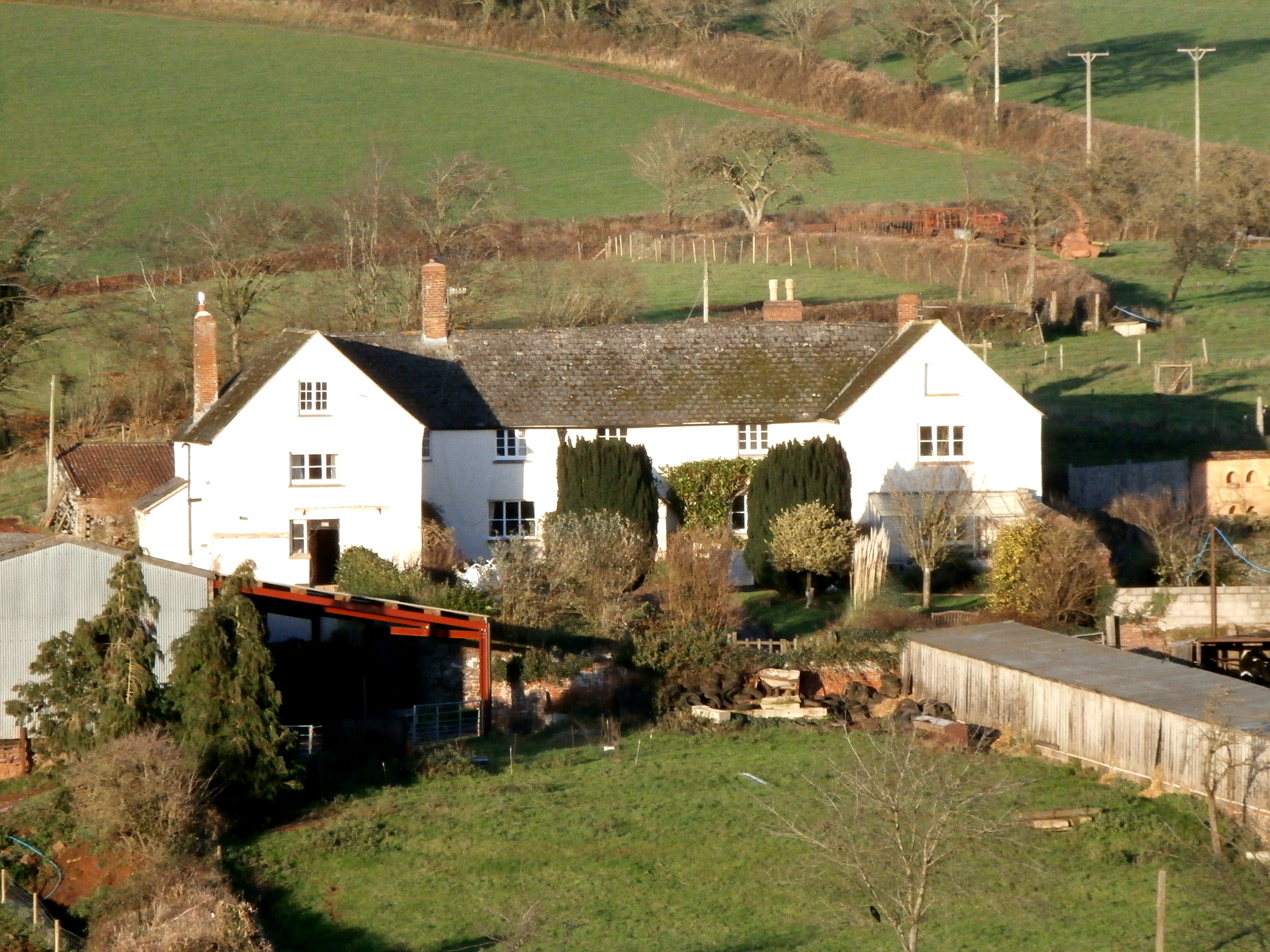
Ruxford Barton, Sandford

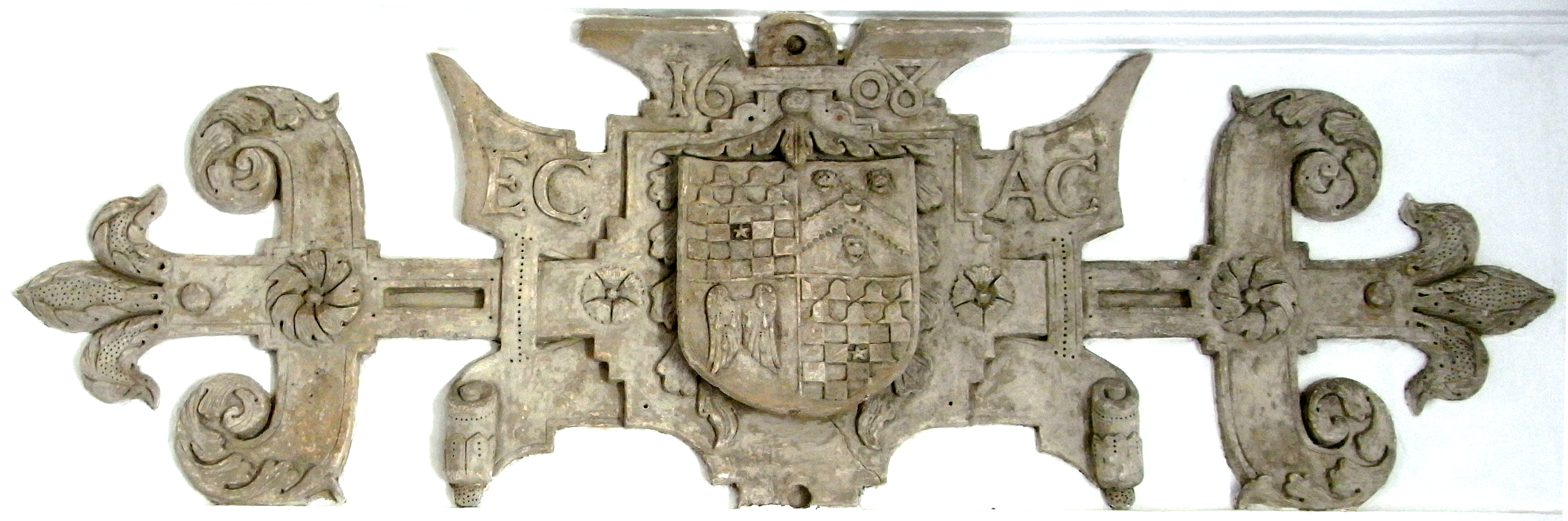
1608 strapwork plaster escutcheon of four quarters in upstairs bedroom of Ruxford Barton, near Crediton, Devon, with initials "EC" and "AC" for Edward Chichester, 1st Viscount Chichester (1568-1648) and his wife Anne Copleston (1588–1616)

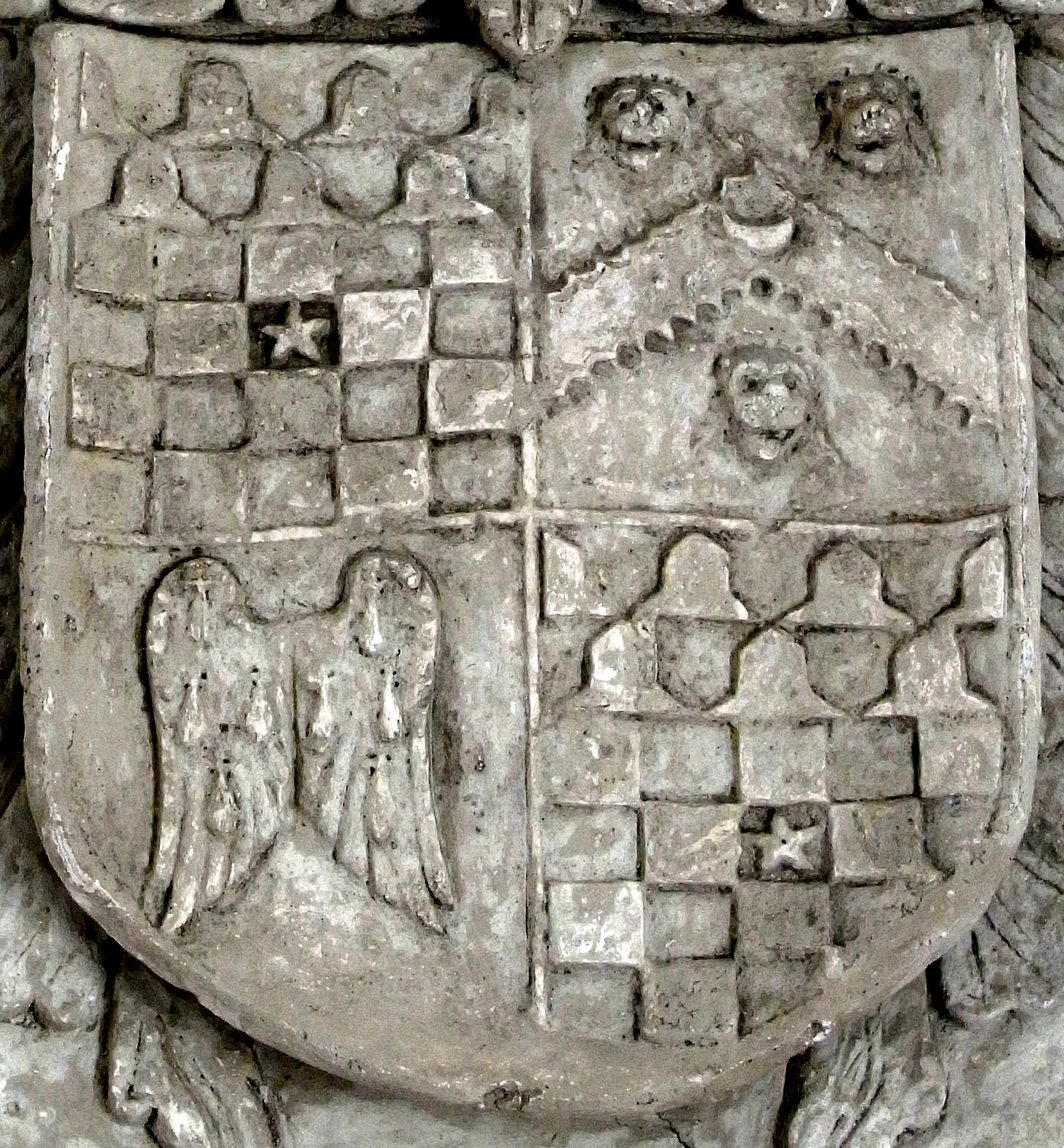
Detail of Chichester escutcheon, Ruxford. Armorials quarters 1&4: Chequy or and gules, a chief vair a mullet for difference (Chichester); 2: Argent, a chevron engrailed gules between three lion's faces azure a crescent for difference (Copleston of Eggesford); 3: Gules, a pair of wings conjoined ermine (de Reigny of Eggesford)

Ruxford is an historic estate in the parish of Sandford, near Crediton in Devon.

== History ==
=== Pre-Norman Conquest ===
Hroces Ford (Ruxford) is recorded in the Anglo Saxon Charters.

=== Courtenay ===
The inquisition post mortem dated 8 June 1404 of Thomasia de Raleigh, heiress of Raleigh, Pilton in North Devon and of many other estates, and wife of John Chichester of Donwer, records that "the aforesaid Manor of Rokesford (Ruxford) is held of Philip Courtenay as of his manor of Bradninch by knight-service". This was Philip Courtenay (c.1342-1406) (5th son of Hugh Courtenay, 2nd Earl of Devon and his wife Margaret Bohun) who had been Steward of the Duchy of Cornwall in Cornwall 1388-1391. The feudal barony of Bradninch, with its member manors including Ruxford, was held before and after Courtenay's brief tenure by the Duchy of Cornwall.

==== De Raleigh & Chichester ====
The estate of Ruxford was held for several generations by the de Raleigh family from the Courtenay family. The eventual heir of de Raleigh was the Chichester family. The de Raleigh family subinfeudated Ruxford to de Sully. The inquisition post mortem of Sir John Chichester (died 1569) of Raleigh dated 2 January 1569 lists Ruxford as held by him from Queen Elizabeth "as of her Manor of Bradninch", which is the last surviving record of its dependency from the feudal barony of Bradninch.

===== Sully =====
Effigies of Sir John de Sully (1282–1388) and his wife Isobel exist in Crediton Parish Church. Sully was lord of the manor of Iddesleigh, but was said by Westcote (d. circa 1637) to have had his seat at "Rookesford, lately the land of Chichester and alienated to Davye", i.e. Ruxford, in the parish of Sandford about 1/2 mile north-west of Crediton. He held Rokysforde from the overlord John de Raleigh of Raleigh in the parish of Pilton, as is evidenced in the latter's deed of 1362 now held in the North Devon Record Office. The heir of John de Raleigh by marriage to his daughter Thomasine was the Chichester family of Raleigh. According to Hoskins the estate of Ruxford is recorded in a charter dated 930 in which a large estate was granted to the canons of Crediton Church. The existing farmhouse known as Ruxford Barton was rebuilt in 1608 by the Chichester family, as is evidenced by a strapwork cartouche in plaster-work displaying the arms of that family with initials and date 1608, in the principal bedroom on the first floor of the parlour wing.

==== Davie ====
In 1618 Ruxford Barton was purchased from Sir Robert Chichester, Bart, KB, by Emmanuel Davie, a "clothier of Crediton", a cousin of the Davie family of Creedy, Sandford. The deed of conveyance is summarised as follows:

The Right Worshipful Sir Robert Chichester of the noble Order of the Bath, Bart, to Emmanuel Davie of Sandford in Crediton, gentleman, whereas ... the Barton Farm, messuage etc called Rokisfoorde or Ruxford, a close of land called Mylum and a parcel of lande a meadow called Nether Apple Meadow in Crediton ... a meadow called Heddge Mead... now sells the premises with all the messuages, buildings, goods, lands etc, etc, to Emmanuel...".

In about 1620 a plaster escutcheon was affixed inside the house showing the de Via arms of the Davie family impaled with the arms of Northcote, the arms of the family of his first wife Katherine Northcote (d.1620).

== Sources ==
- Maddock, Michael P. St J., The Manor of Combe Lancey, Sandford, Crediton, Devon: A history of the 12th Century Norman Manor and the people associated with it through 900 years, 3 volumes, 2015, Devon Record Office, Exeter; Vol.1, Domesday to Hamlyn, esp. pp.111-122, Ruxford
