= Stanley Hirst =

Stanley Hirst is the name of:

- Arthur Stanley Hirst (1883–1930), English entomologist
- Stanley Hirst (trade unionist) (1876–1950), English trade unionist and chair of the Labour Party

== See also ==
- Stan Hurst (1911–1993), English footballer
