= Church of the Holy Cross, Crediton =

- Collegiate Church of the Holy Cross and the Mother of Him Who Hung Thereon
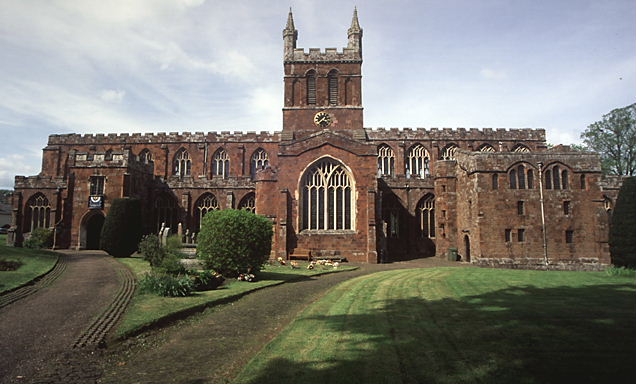
- Crediton Parish Church
- Church of the Holy Cross, Crediton
- 50°47′22.70″N 3°39′8.21″W
- OS grid reference: SS 83641 00204
- Location: Crediton, Devon
- Country: England
- Denomination: Church of England
- Previous denomination: Roman Catholic
- Churchmanship: Broad Church
- Website: creditonparishchurch.org.uk

History
- Former name: Minster Church of St Mary
- Status: Parish church
- Dedication: Holy Cross; Blessed Virgin Mary

Architecture
- Functional status: Active
- Architectural type: Basilica
- Style: Perpendicular Gothic

Administration
- Diocese: Diocese of Exeter
- Archdeaconry: Exeter Archdeaconry
- Deanery: Cadbury Deanery
- Parish: Crediton and Shobrooke with Sandford and Upton Hellions

Clergy
- Rector: The Revd Preb Matthew Tregenza

Listed Building – Grade I
- Official name: Parish Church of the Holy Cross
- Designated: 19 March 1951
- Reference no.: 1209720

Church of the Holy Cross, Crediton, formally the Collegiate Church of the Holy Cross and the Mother of Him Who Hung Thereon, is the parish church of the town of Crediton in Devon, England. The church is built on the site of what was the cathedral of the Bishop of Crediton in the former diocese until 1050 when the see was transferred to Exeter. A college of canons remained at Crediton, administering the buildings and life of the "collegiate" church.

The nave and chancel of the current building date from the 15th century. At the English Reformation the church was surrendered to Henry VIII in 1545, and the college dispersed. The church buildings were bought by the Crediton Town Corporation who still administer the fabric today.

Now a parish church, the life of the church is administered by the parochial church council (PCC), although many still refer to the church as the Collegiate Church of the Holy Cross. The church is held in trust by the Governors of Crediton for the people of the parish, but its life and worship are planned by the clergy and parochial church council. The church is a Grade I listed building.

== History ==
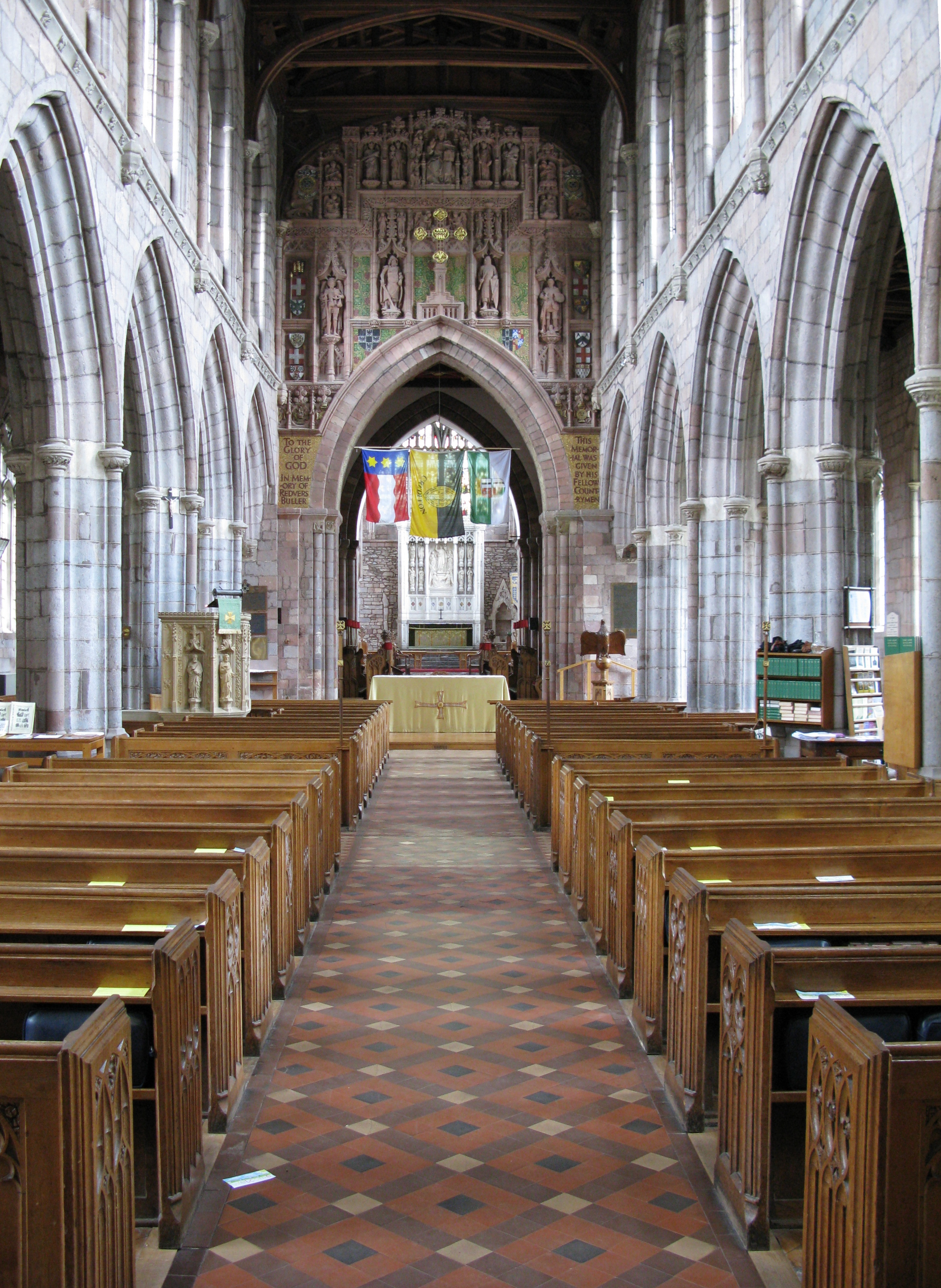
Nave, looking East

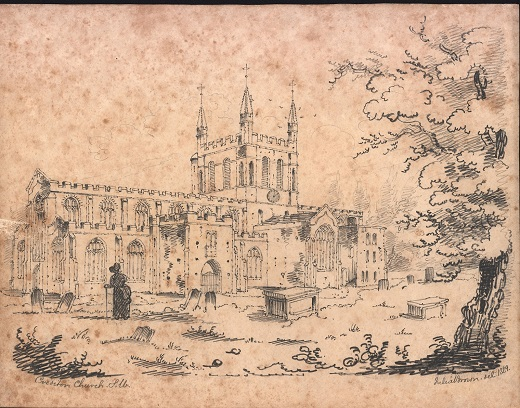
Drawing of the church by Julia Brown in 1829

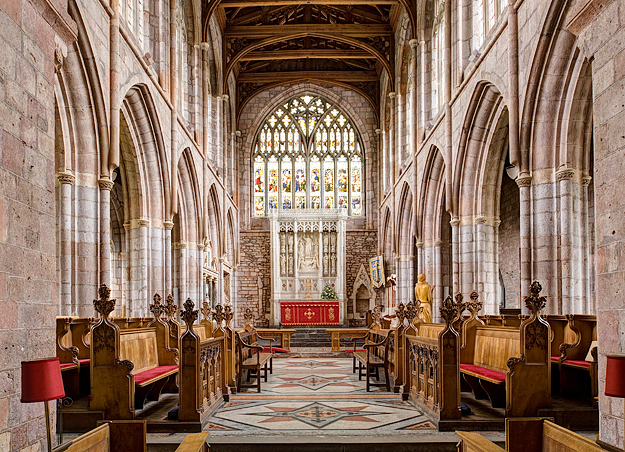
Chancel, looking East

Crediton Church has a history which is as long as that of any church in Devon, including Exeter Cathedral. In the early 10th century Crediton was chosen as the site for the cathedral for Devon and Cornwall and a cathedral was built there c. 910 AD by Eadwulf of Crediton. In 1046 Leofric was appointed to both the sees and moved the Devon see to Exeter. The cathedra, the bishop's throne, was moved to Exeter in 1050, where it was placed in a Saxon minster until a purpose-built cathedral could be constructed which did not happen for many years.

Crediton had lost the see, but the Bishop of Exeter retained his palace there (a little to the north-east of Holy Cross) and his lands around the town. The church survived, though not in its original building. The construction of a Norman church on the present site was started—building work was in progress in the 1130s—and a collegiate church (based on the old cathedral and initially staffed by eighteen canons with eighteen vicars) was established, although lack of funds meant that the number of canons was soon reduced to twelve.

The collegiate church was always completely secular: none of the canons or vicars lived the communal life of monks, their work being funded by income from tithes on the extensive lands of the parish (which were shared with the bishop).

The early dedication of the church was to St Mary, but the present dedication—the Church of the Holy Cross and the Mother of Him Who Hung Thereon—came into use only after the 1230s. The church was extended in the late 13th century by the addition of the Lady Chapel and the Chapter House.

John de Grandisson, Bishop of Exeter (1327–1369), attempted to ensure that at least the chief officers of the college, the precentor and the treasurer, were resident in the immediate area of the church. Grandisson had enormous influence on the church in Crediton in another way. This was by introducing—or reviving—the cult of St Boniface (the cult of the saints was in full swing at this time) and firmly established Crediton as his birthplace. A new statue of St Boniface was created in the 1970s by the sculptor Witold Gracjan Kawalec.

In a medieval will it was stated that the Norman nave of the church was being "now nearly levelled to the ground." The bequest of that testator, and others of around the same time, brought enough money for a complete rebuilding of the nave and chancel areas, which started in the early years of the fifteenth century. Great church building depended on generous funding being available. The Perpendicular Gothic rebuilding of Crediton Collegiate Church created a church which though impressive in scale is architecturally fairly modest.

The collegiate churches were dissolved between 1545 and 1549 and Crediton's was "surrendered" to Henry VIII in May 1545. Shortly afterwards the parishioners of Crediton entered into successful negotiations with the Crown for the purchase of the collegiate church which was then threatened with demolition. These were completed in the spring of 1547, when the town paid the sum of £200 to the king. In April 1547, Edward VI signed a charter which created a new organisation for the governance of the church. This was a corporation of 12 governors to administer the parish church and its endowments. A vicar of Crediton was appointed together with two chaplains, one of which ministered to Sandford (the adjoining parish).

The twelve governors of the Crediton Church Corporation, a registered charity, still own and administer the church buildings. Only two other parish churches in England, the church of Ottery St Mary in Devon and Wimborne Minster in Dorset, have a similar form of governance.

Popular sayings

"That’s Exter (Exeter), as the old woman said when she saw Kerton (Crediton)." According to E. Cobham Brewer, this is "a Devonshire saying, meaning, I thought my work was done, but I find much still remains before it is completed. The tradition is that the woman in question was going for the first time to Exeter, and seeing the grand old church of Kerton (Crediton), supposed it to be Exeter Cathedral. 'That's Exter,' she said, 'and my journey is over'; but alas! she had still eight miles to walk."

== Monuments ==
The principal monuments within the church include:

- Monument with effigy of William Peryam (1534–1604), of Little Fulford (now Shobrooke Park) Lord Chief Baron of the Exchequer. North side of chancel.
- Tuckfield Monument, north side of chancel, adjacent to the west side of the Peryam monument. Monument with seated effigy of Elizabeth Tuckfield (1593–1630). This family was resident at Little Fulford which they inherited from descendants of Peryam.
- Heraldic window c. 1924, south wall of south transept, bequeathed by W.M. Smith-Dorrien (d. 1924), Vicar of Crediton. Shows arms of many historic families associated with the parish.
- De Sully effigies of John de Sully (1282–1388), and his wife Isobel. East end of south choir aisle. Sully was lord of the manor of Iddesleigh, but was said by Westcote to have had his seat at "Rookesford" (Ruxford), in the parish of Sandford about ½-mile north-west of Crediton. He held Ruxford of John de Raleigh of Raleigh in the parish of Pilton, as is evidenced in the latter's deed of 1362 now held in the North Devon Record Office.
- Memorial to Redvers Buller (1839–1908), of Downes House, army general, Victoria Cross recipient, lord of the manor of Crediton, west side of tower arch.

== Organ ==
The War Memorial Organ was designed based on plans drawn by the church's organist Harold Organ in 1915. Harold Organ was killed in action in 1917 but the plans were continued by Cyril Church. The organ was built by Harrison & Harrison of Durham, and first used in 1921. The organ was restored and put in a new case in 2001.

=== Organists ===
- William Hayes 1838 – 1850 (formerly organist of St George’s Meeting House, South Street, Exeter}
- Frederick Dean 1851 – 1854 (afterwards organist of St Thomas' Church, Lancaster)
- John W. Bradley 1855 – 1869
- E.H. Birch 1869 – 1870 (formerly assistant organist at Winchester Cathedral, afterwards organist of St Saviour's Church, Eastbourne)
- William J. Kempton 1870 – 1871
- H.J. Stone 1871 – 1879 (afterwards organist of St Thomas’ Church, Douglas, Isle of Man)
- Arthur Jackman 1879 – 1882 (formerly assistant organist at Ely Cathedral)
- Charles Walter Clarke 1882 – 1911
- Norman Frederick Byng Johnson 1912 – 1914 (formerly organist at St Mark's Church, Swindon)
- Harold C. Organ 1915 – 1917 (formerly organist of St Michael's Church, Gloucester and assistant organist of Gloucester Cathedral)
- Cyril G. Church 1917 – 1945 (formerly organist at St Mary and St Eanswythe's Church, Folkestone)
- Marjorie Jaco 1945 – 1960 (formerly organist of St Swithun’s Church, Woodbury)

== See also ==
Churches and chapels of the United Benefice:

- St Lawrence, Crediton
- St Swithin's, Shobrooke
- St Swithun's, Sandford
- Beacon Church, Sandford (New Buildings)
- St Mary the Virgin, Upton Hellions
- Holy Trinity, Yeoford
- St Luke's, Posbury
- St Francis', Posbury
