= John Sully =

English knight

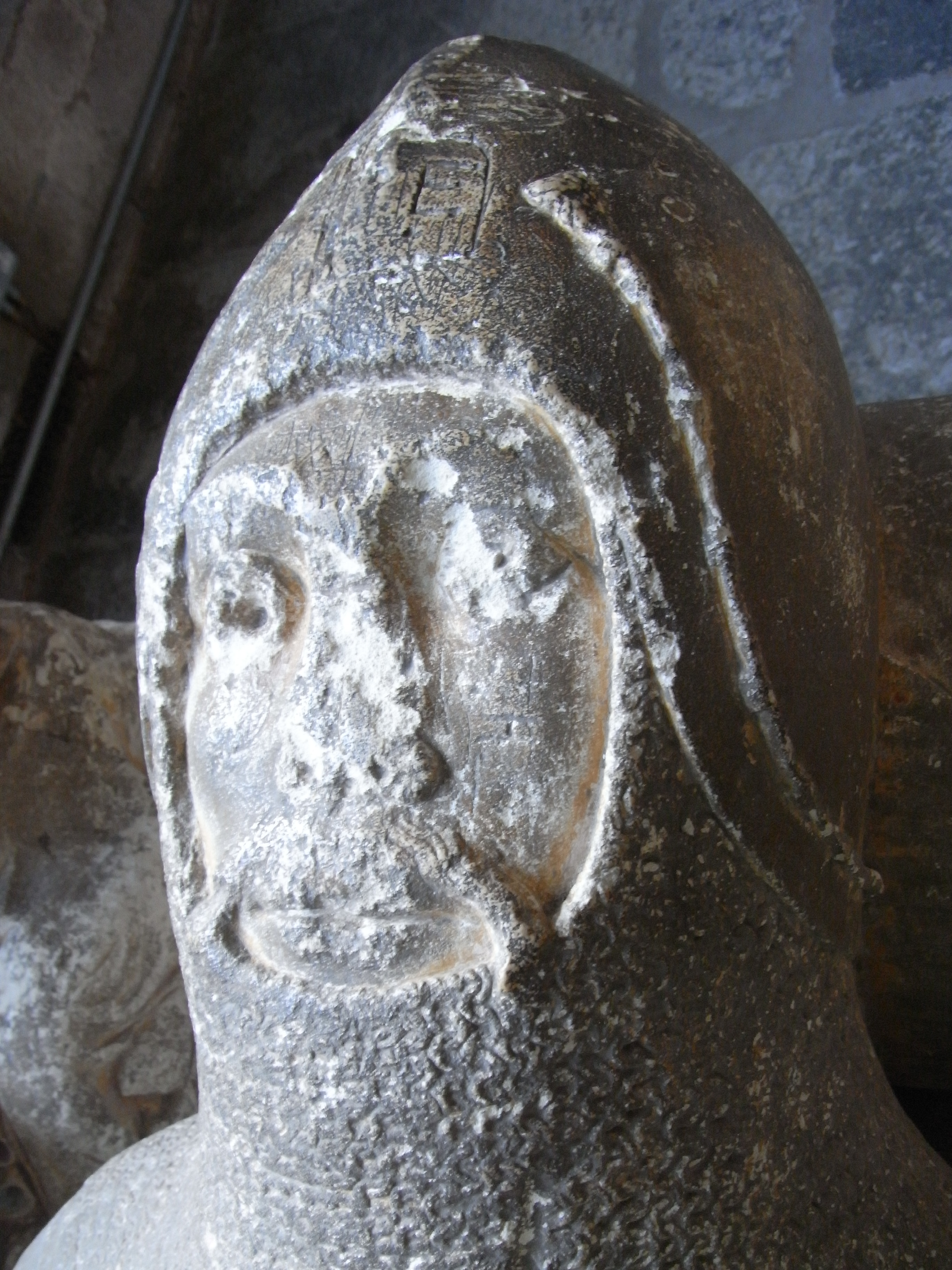
Sir John Sully (d.1388), KG, of Ruxford, near Crediton, Devon. Detail of his effigy in Crediton Parish Church

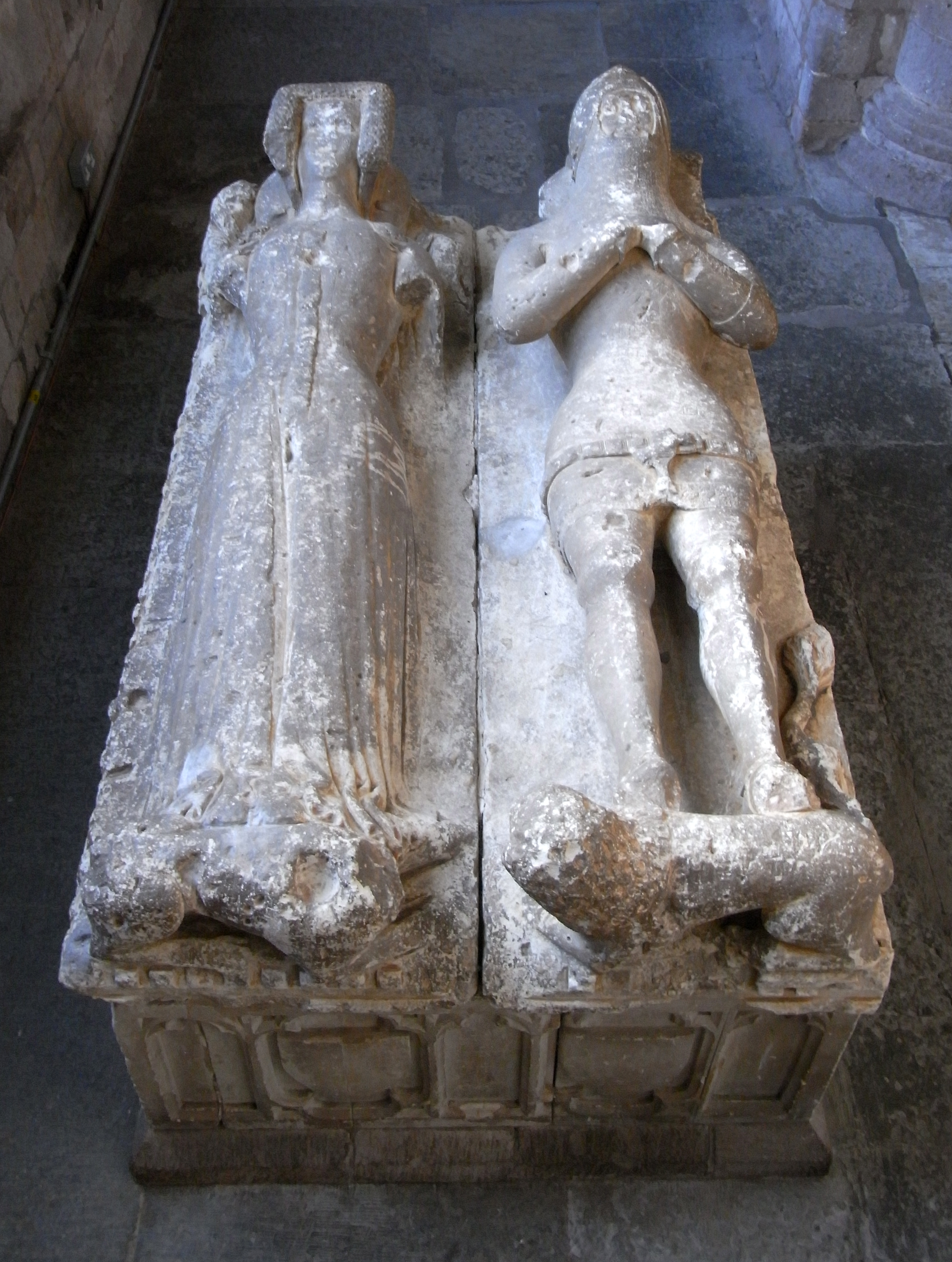
Effigies of Sir John Sully (d.1388) and his wife in Crediton Parish Church

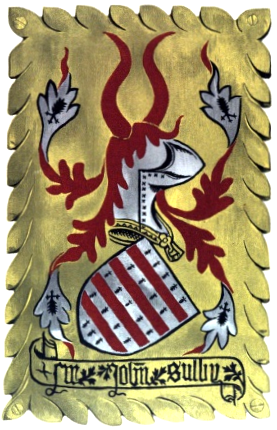
Garter stall plate of Sir John Sully, KG, showing arms: Ermine, four barrulets gules, as also recorded by Ashmole (d.1692). Possibly a reproduction as according to Nicolas (1832), the plate was lost.

Arms of Sir John Sully according to Pole (d.1635): Ermine, three chevrons gules

Sir John Sully (c.1283 – c.1388), KG, of Ruxford and Iddesleigh in Devonshire, was an English knight. He was one of the many deponents who gave evidence in Scrope v Grosvenor (decided in 1389), one of the earliest heraldic law cases brought in England, at which time he stated his age as 105. In about 1362, he was appointed by King Edward III as the 39th Knight of the Garter.

== Origins ==
According to Nicolas (1832), he descended from a younger branch of the family of Sully, lords of the manor of Iddesleigh in Devonshire, and appears to have succeeded to that property as heir male. According to Pole, he possessed Iddesleigh in 1356. According to Nicholas: "Nothing can with certainty be said of his parents, nor is it positively known whether he left descendants". He may have been a descendant of Reymode de Sully, the son of Walter de Sully, who in 1291 held a fifth moiety of the feudal barony of Great Torrington in Devon, on which he paid feudal relief of £20 to the king, presumably having just then inherited it from his father. The moiety had been first acquired by his ancestor de Sully who had married one of the five sisters and co-heiresses of Matthew de Torrington, feudal baron of Great Torrington. On failure of the male line, this de Sully moiety passed to the de Brian family, by the marriage during the reign of King Henry III (1216-1272) of Guy de Brian to the heiress Sibil de Sully (sister of Raymond de Sully and daughter of Walter de Sully). The eventual co-heir to Guy de Brian was Sir John Cary (d.1395) of Cockington, Devon.

He may also have been descended from the 11th century knight Sir Reginald (or Raymond) de Sully, one of the Twelve Knights of Glamorgan, the legendary followers of Robert FitzHamon (d.1107), the Norman conqueror of Glamorgan. He was given as his share of the conquered lands the lordship of Sully, where he built his castle.

Risdon apparently confused him with "John de Sudeley", who in 1301 sealed the Barons' Letter to the Pope with a seal inscribed S(igillum) Johannis de Suleye ("seal of John de Suleye") and bearing arms of two bendlets, and who in the document is called Joh(ann)es D(omi)n(u)s de Sullee ("John, lord of Sullee"), which place Lord Howard de Walden (1903) identified as Sudeley Castle in Gloucestershire.

== Armorials ==
His Garter stall plate does not survive but was recorded by the antiquarian Ashmole (d.1692) as showing arms of Ermine, four barrulets gules with crest Two bull's horns. His family's arms are however given differently by the Devon historian Sir William Pole (d.1635) as Ermine, three chevrons gules

== Career ==
It appears that he passed the greater part of his life in the field, and that he was the "hero of a hundred battles." He was at the Battle of Halidon Hill in Scotland, and at the taking of Berwick in July 1333. On 12 July 1338, he was in France, in the retinue of the Earl of Salisbury and was present at the Battle of Crécy in August 1346. On 29 August 1350, he was at the naval battle under King Edward III in person, when a complete victory was gained over the Spanish fleet, thence called the Battle of Les Espagnols sur Mer (modern: Battle of Winchelsea). Sully was in Gascony with the Black Prince in 1355 and 1356, and a payment was made to him at Bordeaux on 1 October 1355 by the hands of Richard Baker his esquire.' On 17 September 1356, he shared in the honours of the Battle of Poitiers and letters of protection were granted to him in 1359, when he was in the army in Gascony. In 1361, he obtained the following singular grant from the King: "That he might once in every year during his life, in any of the royal forests, parks, or chases in the realm, have one shot with his bow, one course with his hounds, and one chase for his dog called Bercelette". The merits of Sir John Sully were about this time rewarded in the most striking manner. On the feast of St. George 1362 he was elected into the Order of the Garter, in the ninth stall on the Prince's side, in lieu of Sir Reginald Cobham; and the Garter stall plate of his arms was still remaining in the reign of Charles II. In 1362, he was a mainpernor for John de Saint Low the son, and Matthew de Goumay, then prisoners in the Tower of London. Sully again accompanied the Black Prince to Gascony in 1365, and in April 1367 was at the Battle of Nájera. Three years afterwards, in 1370, he again received letters of protection, being about to serve in Acquitaine and as he was then nearly ninety years old, it is not surprising that his name does not afterwards occur in public records until his appearance as a witness in favour of Sir Richard Scrope. He seems to have then retired from public life, attended by Richard Baker his faithful esquire, who, having partaken of his master's toils and dangers, became the companion of his latter years.

=== Crusader ===
The following anecdote of a Sir John Sully is related by Pole:

"Sir John Sully, renowned for his exploits in the Holy Land against the Saracens, in which he was weakened by many wounds, returned home after many years' discontinuance, whereupon his officers bringing in the accounts of his rent, which amounted to a great mass of money, he caused his cloak, being of cloth of gold, to be spread on the ground, and commanding the money to be put therein, cast himself thereinto, that it might be said for once he tumbled in gold and silver; whereof he afterwards gave one part to his wife, a second to his officers and tenants, a third part to the poor".

His action was deemed by the Duchess of Cleveland (1889) "a childish excursion into Tom Tidler's Ground."

=== Deponent at Scrope v Grosvenor ===
Due to his very old age of 105, and his inability to travel to the court of the Earl Marshal, an officer of the court was sent to his house at Iddesleigh to record his deposition, which he gave in favour of Sir Richard Scrope in the famous case of Scrope v Grosvenor, decided in 1389, in which he stated he saw Scrope bear the arms which formed the subject of the case. Sir John Sully, of the age of one hundred and five year, and armed eighty years, deposed that he had seen and known the arms of Sir Richard Scrope, borne by Sir Henry Scrope, at the battle of Halidon Hill, blazoned: "the field azure, a bend or, with a label argent". He afterwards saw the said Sir Henry armed in the same arms at the Siege of Berwick; Sir William Scrope at the battle of Cressy so armed with a difference; the said Sir Richard armed in the same arms at the Battle of Espagnols-sur-mere; and afterwards saw the said Sir William Scrope armed in the same arms with the Black Prince at the battle of Poictiers, and the said Sir Richard so armed at the battle of Spain, [Najara.] Sully said he had also seen and known others of the name and lineage armed in the same arms in journeys and expeditions, with differences; and in his time he had always heard that the said arms belonged to Sir Richard Scrope by descent, who, with others of his lineage, had peaceably enjoyed them from beyond the time of memory. As to Sir Robert Grosvenor, he never saw or heard of him or of his ancestors, until the time of his examination.

== Landholdings ==
- Ruxford. Sir John Sully's chief residence appears to have been Ruxford, in the parish of Sandford, about 1/2 mile north-west of Crediton in Devon, which he held from the de Raleigh family of Raleigh, Pilton in North Devon, ancestor of the Chichester baronets. Effigies of Sir John Sully and his wife Isobel exist in Crediton Parish Church. Sully was said by the Devon historian Westcote (d.circa 1637) to have had his seat at "Rookesford, lately the land of Chichester and alienated to Davye". He held Rokysforde from John de Raleigh as overlord as is evidenced in the latter's deed of 1362 now held in the North Devon Record Office.
- Iddesleigh. Presumably Sully also resided at the manor house of Iddesleigh, his family's ancient principal seat. He is said by the Duchess of Cleveland (1889) to have given Iddesleigh to his cousin Lord Martyn, whose family were feudal barons of Barnstaple in North Devon.

== Death and succession ==
Sully probably died in about 1388 as he is not mentioned in the records of the Order of the Garter after that year, at above the age of 105. The Devon historian Risdon (d.1640) states that he was buried in Crediton Church, a large and important collegiate church near his seat of Ruxford, having "died of the wounds received in the Holy War", which wounds however apparently allowed him to live on to a great age. Regarding any progeny, Nicholas (1832) stated: "Nothing can with certainty be said of his parents, nor is it positively known whether he left descendants". The Westcountry historian Polwhele (d.1838) states however that the last male of the de Sully family left an only daughter who married Vowel, a Somersetshire knight, from whom the Smith family inherited a moiety of the manor of Iddesleigh.

== Chantry ==
A chantry in Crediton Church was established by nine men resident near Crediton which provided an endowment to the Canons of Crediton to find a priest to sing daily mass for Sully’s soul. One of these contributors was recorded in 1408 as Richard Dowrich of Dowrich, near Ruxford.

== Monuments ==
Two effigies believed to represent Sir John Sully survive in Devon. One in the parish church of Iddesleigh in the form of a crossed-legged knight, traditionally the appropriate form for a crusader, situated in a low arched recess in the north chancel chapel. The other, next to the effigy of his wife, is in Crediton Parish Church on a chest tomb , in the east chapel of the south aisle.

== Sources ==
- Nicolas, Sir Nicholas Harris The Controversy between Sir Richard Scrope and Sir Robert Grosvenor in the Court of Chivalry AD MCCCLXXXV - MCCCXC, Volume 2, London, 1832, pp. 240–3, biography of Sir John Sully
- Cleveland, Duchess of ((Catherine Lucy) Wilhelmina Powlett), The Battle Abbey Roll with some Account of the Norman Lineages, 3 vols., London, 1889, vol.3, Sauley
