= Samuel Dunn (mathematician) =

Innovative British cartographer

- Born: 1723; Crediton, Devon, England
- Died: January 1794 (aged 70–71); London
- Occupations: Mathematician; teacher; cartographer; astronomer
- Spouse: Elizabeth Harrison (m. 1763)

Samuel Dunn (1723 – January 1794) was a British mathematician, teacher, cartographer, and amateur astronomer.

== Biography ==
=== Early life ===
He was born to John and Alice Dunn in Crediton, Devonshire, and baptised there on 7 February 1723. His father died at Crediton in 1744. Samuel Dunn wrote in his will:

In 1743, when the first great fire broke out and destroyed the west town, I had been some time keeping a school and teaching writing, accounts, navigation, and other mathematical science, although not above twenty years of age; then I moved to the schoolhouse at the foot of Bowdown [now Bowden] Hill, and taught there till Christmas 1751, when I came to London.

The schoolhouse was the place where the "English school" was kept previously to its union with the blue school in 1821.

=== Life and career in London ===
Dunn moved to London in December 1751, where he taught in several schools, and gave private lessons. In 1757, he came before the public as the inventor of the "universal planispheres, or terrestrial and celestial globes in plano", four large stereographical maps, with a transparent index placed over each map,

whereby the circles of the sphere are instantaneously projected on the plane of the meridian for any latitude, and the problems of geography, astronomy, and navigation wrought with the same certainty and ease as by the globes themselves, without the help of scale and compasses, pen and ink.

The Earth's Eastern Planisphere – part of Dunn's Universal Planisphere, 1757

He published an account of their Description and Use in 1759. From the preface, it appears that in 1758 Dunn had become master of an academy "for boarding and qualifying young gentlemen in arts, sciences, and languages, and for business", at Chelsea. This was the Maritime Academy, at Ormond House, Paradise Row, where there was a good observatory.

On 1 January 1760, he made the observation of a remarkable comet. He communicated other discoveries to the Royal Society; between 1761 and 1771, Dunn contributed nine papers to the Philosophical Transactions of the Royal Society, but he never became a Royal Society fellow. Dunn was one of the few teachers appointed to issue ship masters with certificates of competence on behalf of the Board of Longitude from 1767. He designed instruments to better measure large angles of longitude and was supported by the Board of Longitude in these efforts. On the title-page of his Atlas he appears as a member of the Philosophical Society at Philadelphia, America. A few of his letters to the historian Thomas Birch are preserved, and one to the botanist Emanuel Mendes da Costa.

Dunn married Elizabeth Harrison in 1763. Towards the end of 1763, he gave up the school at Chelsea. He moved to Brompton Park, near Kensington, and resumed once more his work as private tutor. In 1764, he made a short grand tour through the Kingdom of France. In 1774, when residing at 6 Clement's Inn, near Temple Bar, he published his New Atlas of the Mundane System, or of Geography and Cosmography, describing the Heavens and the Earth. The whole elegantly engraved on sixty-two copper plates. With a general introduction. This folio was republished as second and third editions in 1788 and 1789. About this time his reputation led to an appointment as mathematical examiner for candidates wishing to undertake East India Company service.

Under the company's auspices he was enabled to publish in a handsome form several of his more important works. Such were:

1. A New and General Introduction to Practical Astronomy, with its application to Geography … Topography, octavo, London, 1774.
2. The Navigators Guide to the Oriental or Indian Seas, or the Description and Use of a Variation Chart of the Magnetic Needle, designed for shewing the Longitude throughout the principal parts of the Atlantic, Ethiopic, and Southern Oceans, octavo, London (1775).
3. A New Epitome of Practical Navigation, or Guide to the Indian Seas, containing (1) the Elements of Mathematical Learning, used … in the Theory and Practice of Nautical affairs; (2) the Theory of Navigation. ..; (3) the Method of Correcting and Determining the Longitude at Sea …; (4) the Practice of Navigation in all kinds of Sailing (with copper plates), octavo, London, 1777, and
4. The Theory and Practice of the Longitude at Sea … with copper plates, octavo, London, 1778; second edition, enlarged, quarto, London, 1786.

He also "methodised, corrected, and further enlarged" a goodly quarto, entitled A New Directory for the East Indies … being a work originally begun upon the plan of the Oriental Neptune, augmented and improved by Mr. Willm. Herbert, Mr. Willm. Nichelson, and others, fifth edition, London, 1780, with a sixth edition following in 1791. Dunn was living at 8 Maiden Lane, Covent Garden, in July 1777, but by September 1780 had taken up his abode at 1 Boar's Head Court, Fleet Street, where he continued for the remainder of his life.

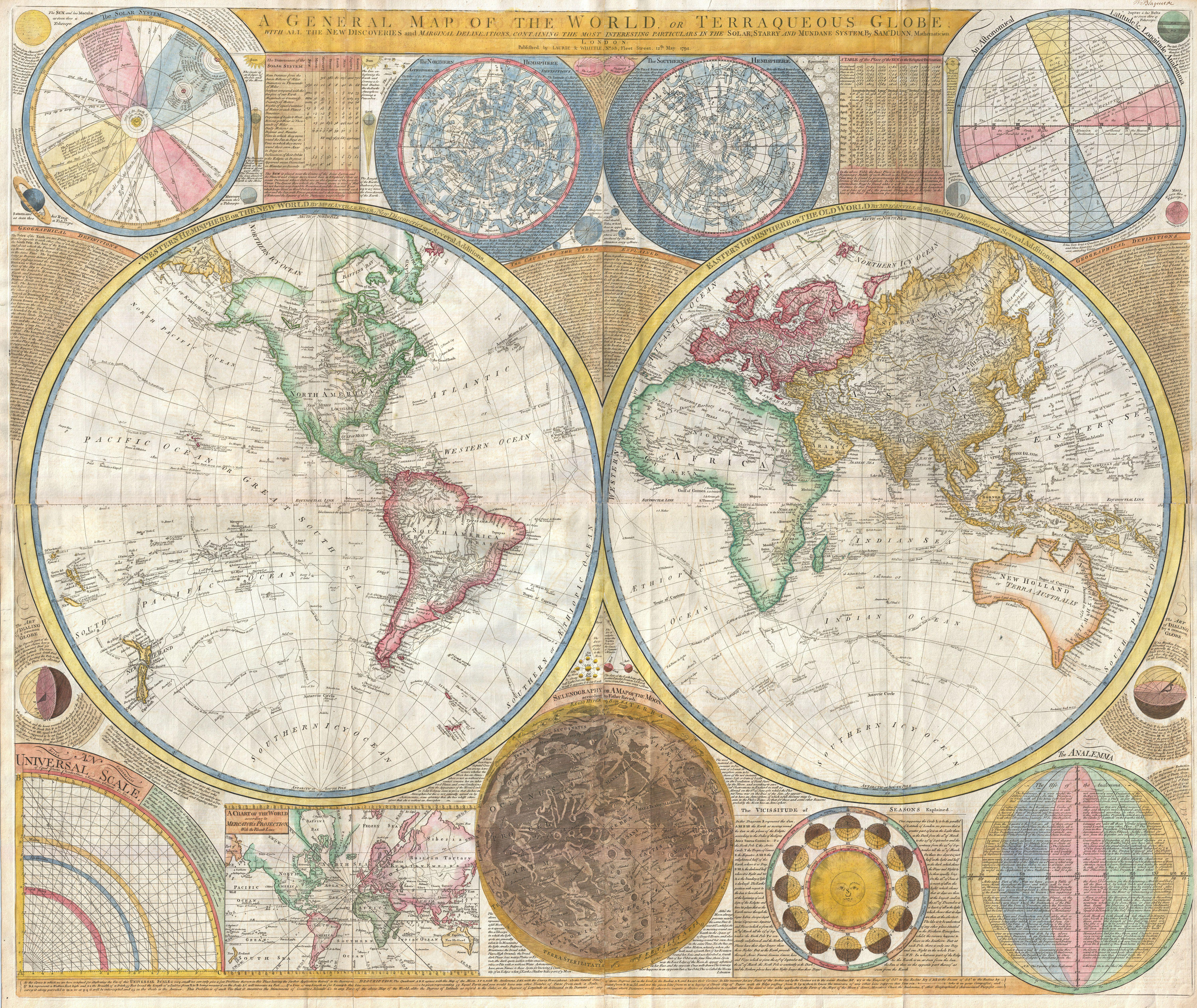
World map by Samuel Dunn, 1794, with star charts, map of the Moon, map of the Solar System, and numerous other features

=== Death and legacy ===
He died in January 1794. His will, dated 5 January 1794, was proved at London, on 20 January by his kinsman, William Dunn, officer of excise of London (registered in P.C.C., 16, Holman). Therein he describes himself as "teacher of the mathematics and master for the longitude at sea", and desires to be buried "in the parish church belonging to the place where I shall happen to inhabit a little time before my decease". He names seven relations to whom he left £20 each; but to his wife, Elizabeth Dunn, "who hath withdrawn herself from me near thirty years, the sum only of ten pounds". No children are mentioned. His library and instruments were sold at auction.

He also requested the corporation of Crediton to provide always and have a master of the school at the foot of Bowden Hill residing therein, of the church of England, but not in holy orders, an able teacher of writing, navigation, the lunar method of taking the longitude at sea, planning, drawing, and surveying, with all mathematical science. For this purpose he left £30 a year. Six boys were to be taught, with a preference to his own descendants. The stock thus bequeathed produced in 1823 dividends amounting to £25 4/- per annum, the school being known as Dunn's School.

== Published works ==
Besides the seven works mentioned above and his many maps and charts, he also published the following (based on Goodwin (1888), with corrections and additions from modern library catalogues):

- A Popular Lecture on the Astronomy and Philosophy of Comets, octavo, London, 1759.
- Improvements in the Doctrine of the Sphere, Astronomy, Geography, Navigation, &c. Deduced from the Figure and Motion of the Earth; and Absolutely Necessary to be Applied in Finding the True Longitude at Sea and Land, quarto, London, 1765.
- A Determination of the exact Moments of Time when the Planet Venus was at external and internal contact with the Sun's Limb, in the Transits of 6 June 1761 and 3 June 1769, quarto, London, 1770.
- An Introduction to the Theory and Use of the Pantographer; As Made and Improved by Thomas Newman, (Successor to Mess. Heath and Wing,) Mathematical Instrument Maker in Exeter Change, London, 1774.
- A New Atlas of Variations of the Magnetic Needle for the Atlantic, Ethiopic, Southern and Indian Oceans; drawn from a theory of the magnetic system, London, 1776.
- The Description and Use of a New and Easy Formula, for determining the time of the day, the azimuth of the sun, and the latitude, London, 1777.
- A New and Easy Method of finding the Latitude on Sea or Land, octavo, London, 1778.
- Nautical Propositions and Institutes; or Directions for the Practice of Navigation, octavo, London, 1781.
- An Introduction to Latitude, without Meridian Altitudes; and Longitude, at Sea; having Contemporary Observations: with Astronomical Delineations and Nautical Formulas, engraved on copper plates, octavo, London, 1782.
- The Linear Tables described, and their utility verified, octavo, London, 1783.
- Lunar Tables, Nos. 1–5, folio, London, 1783.
- A new Formula for Latitude, s. sh. quarto, London, 1784. Engraved.
- Formulas for all parts of Navigation, having the Tables of Logarithms, s. sh. quarto, London, 1784. Engraved.
- General Magnetic and True Journal at Sea, s. sh. quarto, London, 1784. Engraved.
- Magnetic and true Journal at Sea, s. sh. quarto, London, 1784. Engraved. (Another edition, s. sh. quarto, London, 22 September 1784. Engraved.).
- Rules for a Ship's Journal at Sea, s. sh. folio, London, 1784. Engraved.
- Ship's Journal at Sea, s. sh. quarto, London, 1784. Engraved.
- A Table for Transverses and Currents, s. sh. quarto, London, 1784.
- Tables of Correct and Concise Logarithms … with a compendious Introduction to Logarithmetic, octavo, London, 1784.
- Precepts, Formulas, Tables, Charts, and Improvements, London, 1784.
- Nautic Tables, octavo, London, 1785.
- Tables of Time and Degrees, and hourly change of the Suns right Ascension', s. sh. quarto, London, 1786.
- A Description of peculiar Charts and Tables for facilitating a Discovery of both the Latitude and Longitude in a Ship at Sea, folio, London, 1787.
- Linear Tables, one, two, three, four, and five, abridged, &c. (Linear Tables viii. ix. of Proper Logarithms. Linear Tables x. xi.) 3 plates, folio, London, 1788.
- Linear Table xvi. for showing the Suns Declination. (Errata in the reductions.)' folio, London, 1788.
- The Lunar Method Shortend in Calculation & Improv'd. (Short Rules for practical navigation.)' octavo, London, 1788.
- A Navigation Table for shortening days works, s. sh. folio, London, 1788.
- The Longitude Journal; its description and application, folio, London, 1789.
- The Sea-Journal improved, with its description, &c., folio, London, 1789.
- The Daily Uses of Nautical Sciences in a Ship at Sea, particularly in finding and keeping the Latitude and Longitude during a voyage, octavo, London, 1790.
- An Introduction to the Lunar Method of Finding the Longitude in a Ship at Sea, &c., octavo, London, 1790.
- A New Directory for the East Indies, 6th edition, London, 1791.
- The Astronomy of Fixed Stars, concisely deduced from original principles, and prepared for application to Geography and Navigation, Part I., quarto, London, 1792.
- Improvements in the Methods now in use for taking the Longitude of a Ship at Sea. Invented and described by S. Dunn, octavo, London, 1793.
- The Longitude Logarithms; in their Regular and Shortest Order, made easy for use in taking the Latitude and Longitude, at Sea and Land, octavo, London, 1793 (British Museum Cat.; Watt, '"Bibl. Brit"'. i. 324 f.).
