= Keith Harvey =

English footballer

Personal information
- Full name: William Keith Harvey
- Date of birth: 25 December 1934
- Place of birth: Crediton, England
- Date of death: October 2018 (aged 83)
- Place of death: Portsmouth, England
- Position: Centre half

Youth career
- Crediton United

Senior career*
Years	Team	Apps	(Gls)
1952–1969	Exeter City	483	(28)
Total		483	(28)
- * Club domestic league appearances and goals

William Keith Harvey (25 December 1934 – October 2018) was an English professional footballer who played as a centre half.

== Career ==
Born in Crediton, Harvey played for Crediton United and Exeter City, before becoming a coach at Exeter City.
