= Upton Hellions =

Village in Devon, England

Coordinates: 50.818°N 3.646°W

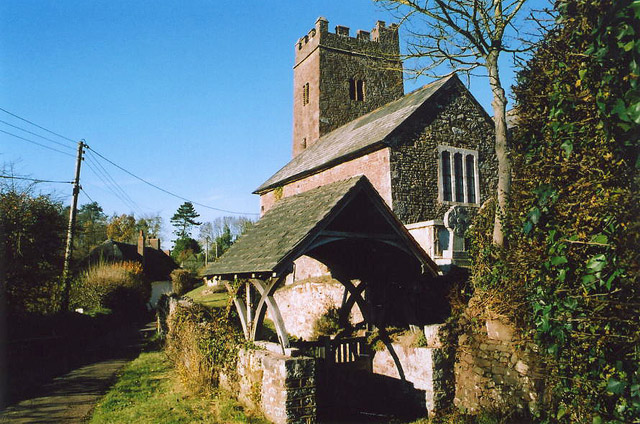
The Church of St Mary the Virgin

Upton Hellions is a village in Devon, England, located north of Long Barn and south of East Village, and near to Crediton.

The Church of St Mary the Virgin is a Grade I listed building, which has a Norman south door, 16th-century bench ends and Victorian tiles in the chancel showing the signs of the zodiac.
