= Stan Hurst =

English footballer (1911–1993)

Personal information
- Full name: Stanley Charles Hurst
- Date of birth: 21 June 1911
- Place of birth: Newton St Cyres, England
- Date of death: 28 May 1993 (aged 81)
- Place of death: Crediton, England
- Height: 5 ft 8 in (1.73 m)
- Position: Forward

Senior career*
Years	Team	Apps	(Gls)
- Jackson's United (Crediton)
- Newton Poppleford
19??–1932	Tipton St John		
1932–1936	Exeter City	107	(25)
1936–1937	Watford	29	(12)
1937–1939	Brighton & Hove Albion	33	(11)
1939–1946	Aldershot (Note: Appearance made in the 1939–40 Football League season abandoned on the outbreak of war; such appearances are conventionally not included in a player's career record.)	1	(1)
1947–1948	Crediton United		
- * Club domestic league appearances and goals

Stanley Charles Hurst (21 June 1911 – 28 May 1993) was an English professional footballer who played as an outside forward and centre forward in the Football League for Exeter City, Watford and Brighton & Hove Albion.

== Life and career ==
Hurst was born in 1911 in Newton St Cyres, Devon, where his father was the stationmaster. He attended Queen Elizabeth's Grammar School in Crediton. He played works and village football, and was employed as a porter at Tipton St Johns railway station when he joined Exeter City in 1932, initially as an amateur. He made his Third Division South debut in October 1932 and turned professional later that season. He became a regular in the side, was their top scorer in 1933–34, and scored the winning goal as Exeter beat Torquay United 2–1 to win the inaugural edition of the Football League Third Division South Cup. He scored 25 goals from 107 league appearances before moving on to another Southern Section club, Watford, in 1936 for an undisclosed fee. Hurst spent only one season with Watford; he scored 14 goals from 32 appearances in all competitions and was sold for £125 to Brighton & Hove Albion, also of the Third Division South. He played little in his first season and appeared in more than half the matches in his second, scoring 11 goals from 34 appearances in all competitions.

He joined Aldershot ahead of the 1939–40 Football League season but played only once, scoring a late equaliser away to Swindon Town, before competitive football was suspended for the duration of the Second World War. He appeared as a guest for Reading in the wartime competitions and played for Aldershot in the 1945–46 season before returning to Devon where he played for Crediton United. He became chairman of the club, and as such took the blame and was banned from football sine die when a cup match in the 1950s turned into a riot.

Hurst collapsed and died in 1993 while playing golf in Crediton; he was 81.
