= Crediton =

Town in Devon, England

Coordinates: 50°47′28″N 3°39′22″W

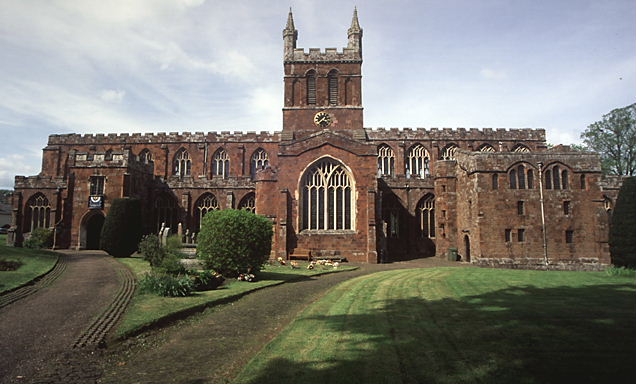
- Church of the Holy Cross, Crediton

- Location within Devon
- Population: 8,304 (2021)
- OS grid reference: SS837005
- Civil parish: Crediton
- District: Mid Devon
- Shire county: Devon
- Region: South West
- Country: England
- Sovereign state: United Kingdom
- Post town: CREDITON
- Postcode district: EX17
- Dialling code: 01363
- Police: Devon and Cornwall
- Fire: Devon and Somerset
- Ambulance: South Western
- UK Parliament: Central Devon

Crediton /ˈkrɛdɪtən/ is a town and civil parish in the Mid Devon district of Devon, England. It stands on the A377 Exeter to Barnstaple road at the junction with the A3072 road to Tiverton, 7 miles (11 km) north west of Exeter and 14 miles (23 km) from the M5 motorway. It has a population of 8304.

The town is in the narrow vale of the River Creedy, between two steep hills and is divided into two parts, the north or old town and the south and east or new town.

== History ==
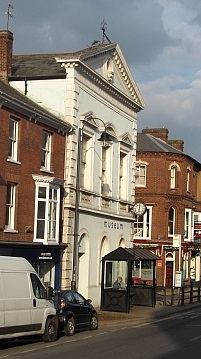
Old Town Hall, Crediton

The first indication of settlement at Crediton is the claim that Winfrith or Saint Boniface was born here in c. 672. He propagated Christianity in the Frankish Empire during the 8th century and is the patron saint of both Germany and the Netherlands. In 909 a see was established here with Edwulf as the first bishop. Nine more bishops ruled here until 1050, when Leofric obtained papal permission from Pope Saint Leo IX to transfer the seat to Exeter, a more culturally aware, larger and walled town. Since 1897 Crediton has been the seat of a suffragan bishopric in the Diocese of Exeter; from 2004 until 2012 this was Robert Evens, between 2012 and 2015 it was Nick McKinnel (who was translated to the Anglican See of Plymouth). The current bishop of Crediton is Moira Astin, who has been the bishop since 2025.

At the Domesday survey (1086) much of the land was still uncultivated, but its prosperity increased, and in 1269 each of the twelve prebends of the collegiate church had a house and farmland within the parish. The bishops to whom the manor belonged until the Reformation had difficulty in enforcing their warren and other rights; in 1351 Bishop Grandisson obtained an exemplification of judgments of 1282, declaring that he had pleas of withername, a view of frankpledge, the gallows and assize of bread and ale. Two years later there was a serious riot against the increase of copyhold.

The jury of the borough are mentioned in 1275, and Crediton returned two members to parliament during the reign of Edward I, in 1306–07, though it was never afterwards represented again. A borough seal dated 1469 is extant, but the corporation is not mentioned in the grant made by Edward VI of the church to twelve principal inhabitants. The borough and manor were granted by Elizabeth I to William Killigrew in 1595, but there is no indication of town organization then or in 1630, and in the 18th century Crediton was governed by commissioners.

The wool trade was established by 1249, and the manufacture and trading of woollen cloth, especially serge, peaked in the 16th century when the town reached the height of its prosperity. In 1630 the market for kerseys was mentioned in conjunction with a saying as fine as Kirton spinning. The woollen textile trade declined after the mid 18th century.

The Western Rising, also called the Prayer Book Rebellion, gained its strength in Crediton in 1549.

… a big lousy town … the houses be mostly of clay, without any timber in the walls except the roof, doors and windows.

— Richard Symons, a Captain in the Royalist Army, writing about Crediton in 1644.

During the English Civil War the Earl of Essex passed through the town on 20 July 1644 on his way to Cornwall, and evidently left the town and surrounding countryside in some disarray. He was closely followed by Charles I who arrived on 27 July to review the army gathered there by his nephew, Prince Maurice, before returning to Exeter for a council of war. The following Sunday, the King spent the night at Crediton and then began his expedition of "Essex-catching".

In late 1645 and early 1646 the town was used as a base by Thomas Fairfax and the New Model Army from where they marched on the Royalist forces gathering in North Devon, and to where they returned on 29 March 1646 after success both at the Battle of Torrington and in overturning the siege of Plymouth.

On Sunday 14 August 1743, a great fire started, completely destroying High Street and buildings in the "West Town". At that period of time it was the second largest fire in the country, second only to the Great Fire of London. Sixteen people lost their lives, with over 2,000 made homeless and 450 houses destroyed. Other large fires occurred in 1766, 1769 and 1772.

The population in the 1841 census was 2,245 inhabitants. The Old Town Hall was completed in 1852.

The town is twinned with Avranches, France.

== Geography ==
=== Climate ===
Crediton has an oceanic climate (Köppen climate classification Cfb).

Climate data for Crediton, 1981–2010 averages
Month	Jan	Feb	Mar	Apr	May	Jun	Jul	Aug	Sep	Oct	Nov	Dec	Year
Mean daily maximum °C (°F)	8 (46)	8 (46)	10 (50)	12 (54)	16 (61)	19 (66)	21 (70)	21 (70)	18 (64)	14 (57)	11 (52)	9 (48)	14 (57)
Mean daily minimum °C (°F)	3 (37)	3 (37)	3 (37)	4 (39)	7 (45)	11 (52)	12 (54)	12 (54)	10 (50)	8 (46)	5 (41)	4 (39)	7 (45)
Average precipitation mm (inches)	120.1 (4.73)	91.5 (3.60)	89.7 (3.53)	71.2 (2.80)	76.1 (3.00)	63.6 (2.50)	68.4 (2.69)	73.4 (2.89)	81.1 (3.19)	121.9 (4.80)	119.2 (4.69)	132.4 (5.21)	1,108.6 (43.65)
Source 1: Weather Channel
Source 2: Chelsa Climate

== Economy ==
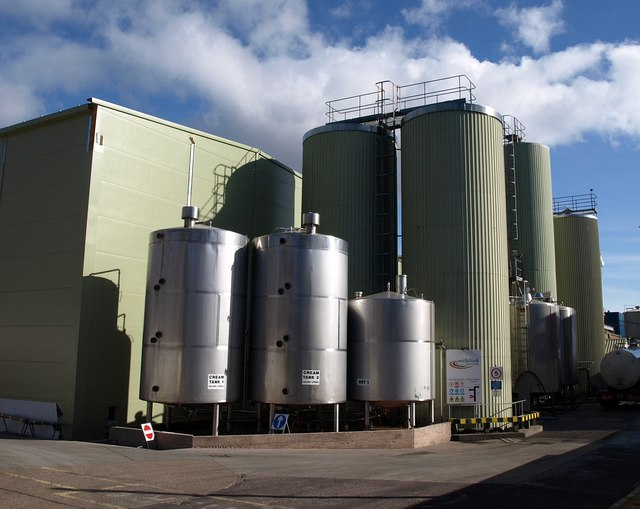
Storage silos at the Milk Link creamery, which produces UHT milk

In the early 20th century shoe-making, tanning, agricultural trade, tin-plating and the manufacture of confectionery and cider had superseded the former large woollen and serge industries.

The creamery and dairy in Crediton has always been located next to the church, but to enable its product to be distributed further, the company ran a transport depot that was located in the goods yard of the railway station. Every day, a train of three or more milk tank wagons would be filled from lorries, and then taken to London by either the Great Western Railway or the Southern Railway. Express Dairies sold the creamery and a similar unit in Kirkcudbright, Scotland in July 2002 to Milk Link, which both by that time produced UHT milk. Milk Link merged with Arla Foods in 2012 but in 2013 the newly merged company sold its Crediton operations in a management buyout. The new company, Crediton Dairy Limited, began trading in April 2013.

Today, the town has two industrial parks at Lords Meadow and Fordton, a dairy and a small collection of units at Westward Business Park. It is the centre for shopping and business for the surrounding area, and has industries such as graphics and pharmaceuticals.

Bristow's of Devon, founded in 1932 was one of the town's main employers but was closed in 2011 after owner New McCowan's went into administration. The factory, on Lords Meadow Industrial Estate, was reopened by Crediton Confectionery which has taken over the Bristow's brand.

In 2001 the Crediton area was given priority status with regard to the government's Market and Coastal Towns Initiative, following the outbreak of foot-and-mouth disease. By 2006, of 45 projects in the plan, 18 had been completed, resolved, or begun.

== Sport and leisure ==
Crediton has a Football Club, (a Crediton United A.F.C.), (affiliated to the FA) which fields both Men's and Women's teams in Senior and Junior competition in local leagues.

Crediton has a Rugby Club (affiliated to the RFU) which has three senior teams, one colts team and a strong girls and Junior section.

Crediton has a running club Crediton Running Network which meets at the Lords Meadow Leisure Centre.

== Media ==
Local TV coverage is provided by BBC South West and ITV West Country. Television signals are received from the Stockland Hill and the local relay transmitters.

Local radio stations are BBC Radio Devon, Heart West, Greatest Hits Radio South West, East Devon Radio and Radio Exe Devon.

The town is served by the local newspaper, Crediton Courier which publishes on Fridays.

== Transport ==
Crediton sign on the A3072

Crediton railway station was designed by Isambard Kingdom Brunel, was opened by the Exeter and Crediton Railway on 12 May 1851 and lies on Station Approach and Exeter Road. The line to Barnstaple was then opened by the North Devon Railway on 1 August 1854. After 1 November 1865 additional London and South Western Railway trains ran through the station going towards Okehampton. It is currently the junction of the Tarka and Dartmoor lines, though the two lines run parallel until Coleford Junction. Crediton is served by all trains on the Barnstaple to Exeter and Okehampton to Exeter services. They connect with main line services at Exeter St Davids.

The Exeter to Plymouth railway of the LSWR has been reopened to connect Okehampton via Crediton and Exeter with the rest of the UK railway system. There are proposals to reopen the line from Tavistock to Bere Alston for a through service to Plymouth.

On the night of 4 February 2014, amid high winds and extremely rough seas, part of the sea wall at Dawlish was breached washing away around 40 metres (130 ft) of the wall and the ballast under the railway immediately behind. The line was closed. Network Rail began repair work and the line reopened on 4 April 2014. In the wake of widespread disruption caused by damage to the mainline track at Dawlish by coastal storms in February 2014, Network Rail are considering reopening the Tavistock to Okehampton and Exeter section of the line as an alternative to the coastal route.

The nearest airport is at Exeter International.

Crediton lies around 14 miles (23 km) from the M5 motorway, Exeter to Bristol and 12 miles (19 km) from the A30 and A38.

== Education ==
Queen Elizabeth's Grammar School, founded by Edward VI and refounded by Elizabeth I, is today a state-run academy, named for Queen Elizabeth I which gets good GCSE and A level results. There are two primary schools: Hayward's Primary School and Landscore Primary School. Nearby in the village of the same name is Sandford School and ten other partner primaries.

== Landmarks ==
- The Anglican Crediton Parish Church, formerly collegiate, is a Perpendicular building with Early English and other early portions, and a central tower.
- Southeast of the town, on a ridge overlooking the river, is the country house, Downes, built about 1692 and remodelled in the 18th century. It was the birthplace of Sir Redvers Buller whose family were lords of the manor of Crediton.
- The northwest side of the town had a great wall built in 1276 and it is still partly remaining today, although now it looks no different from a normal garden wall.

== Notable residents ==
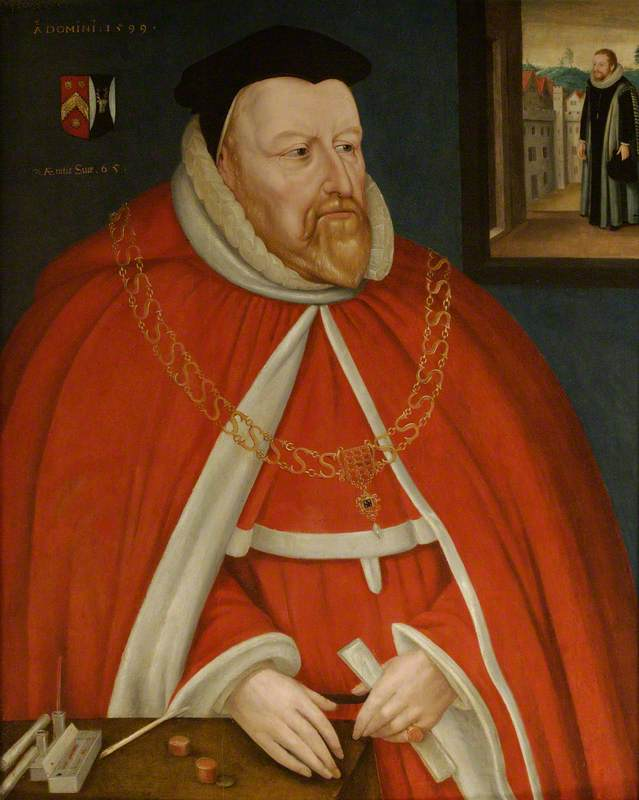
Portrait of Sir William Peryam, c. 1599.

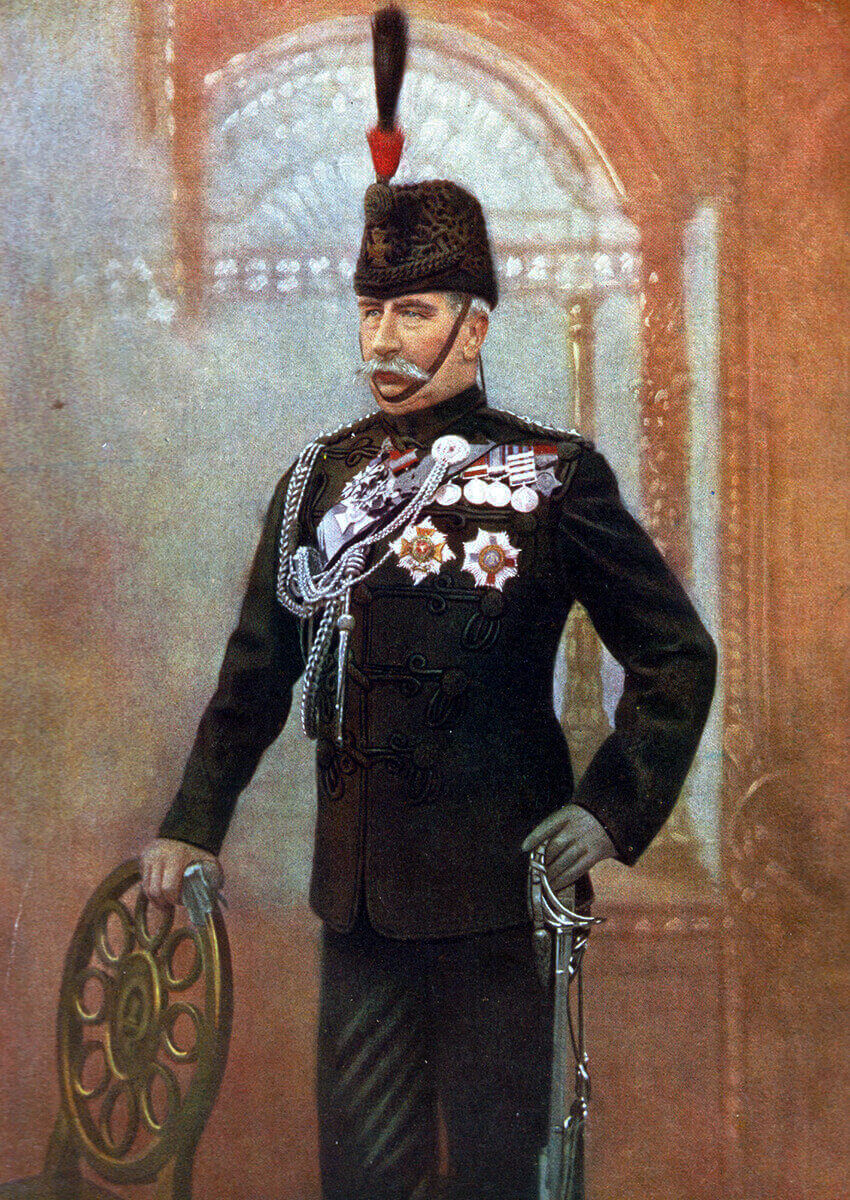
Redvers Buller VC

- Saint Boniface (c. 675–754), Benedictine monk, leading figure in the Anglo-Saxon mission.
- Leofric (1016–1072), a medieval Bishop of Exeter.
- Lyfing of Winchester (d.1046), an Anglo-Saxon prelate who served as Bishop of Cornwall.
- Sir John Sully (c.1283 – c.1388), a knight, appointed by King Edward III the 39th Knight of the Garter.
- Sir William Peryam (1534–1604), judge who became Lord Chief Baron of the Exchequer in 1593.
- John Rowe (1626–1677), clergyman, minister to an important Congregationalist church in London.
- Ezekiel Hopkins (1634–1690), an Anglican divine and Bishop of Derry from 1681 to 1690.
- Samuel Dunn (1723–1794), mathematician, teacher, cartographer and amateur astronomer.
- Ratcliffe Pring (1825–1885), lawyer and politician in Australia
- William Saunders (1836–1914), scientist and author, emigrated to Canada aged 12
- General Sir Redvers Buller (1839–1908), Army officer and the most senior recipient of the Victoria Cross
- Harold Walker (1862–1934), soldier, lived and died locally
- Lauchlan Mackinnon (1877–1934), pastoralist, politician and newspaper owner in Australia, died locally
- Dame Georgiana Buller (1884–1953), founded the first school dedicated to occupational therapy
- Bill Giles (born 1939), a retired British weather forecaster and TV presenter.

=== Sport ===
- Stan Hurst (1911–1993), footballer, played over 170 games, starting with 107 for Exeter City
- Keith Harvey (1934–2018), footballer, played 483 games for Exeter City
- Sam Hill (born 1993), rugby union player who has played 147 games for the Exeter Chiefs
- Sam Gallagher (born 1995), footballer, has played over 300 games

== See also ==
- Crediton railway station
