= Thomas Westcote =

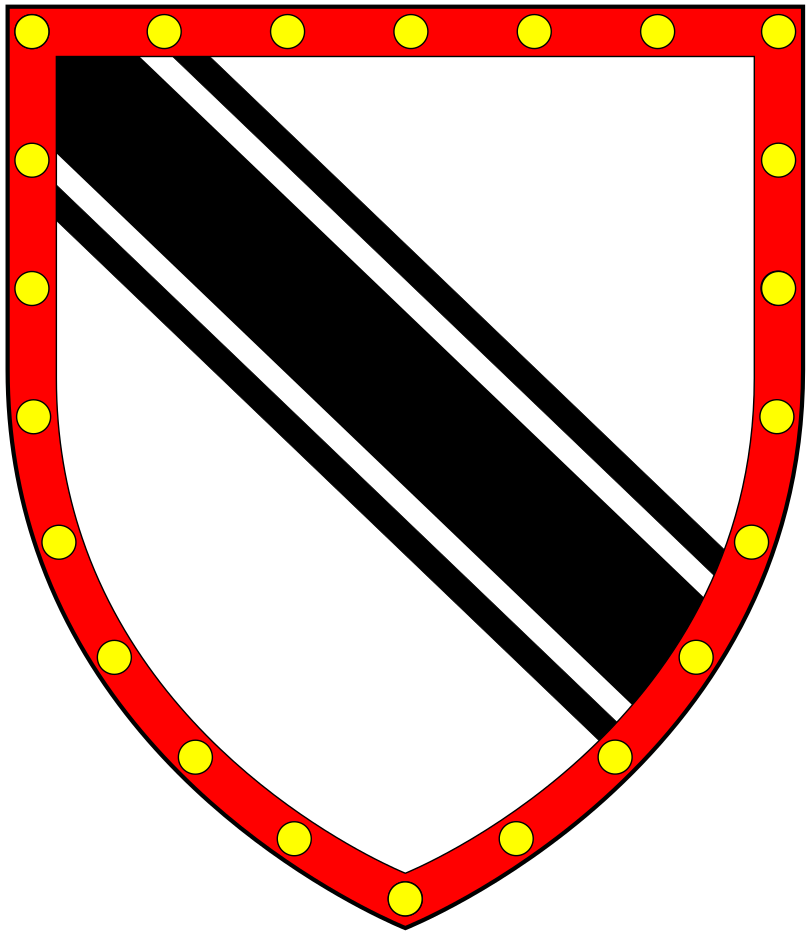
Arms of Westcott: Argent, a bend cotised sable a bordure gules bezantée

Thomas Westcote (c. 1567 – c. 1637) (alias Westcott) of Raddon in the parish of Shobrooke in Devon, was an English historian and topographer of Devon.

== Biography ==
He was descended from the Lyttelton family. He was baptised at Shobrooke in Devon on 17 June 1567. He was the third son of Philip Westcote (died 1601) of West Raddon in the parish of Shobrooke, by his wife Katharine Waltham, a daughter of George Waltham of Brenton in the parish of Exminster, Devon. In his youth he was a soldier, traveller, and courtier, but in middle age he retired to a country life, probably living at West Raddon with his eldest brother, Robert. In 1624 he held a lease of Thorn Park in the parish of Holcombe Burnell.

Westcote interested himself in local antiquities, encouraged by his friendships with fellow Devonshire historians Sir William Pole (1561–1635) and Tristram Risdon (1580–1640). He aimed at a description of Devon, following the model of the Survey of Cornwall by Richard Carew (1555–1620) published in 1602. He was encouraged in his project by Edward Bourchier, 4th Earl of Bath, of Tawstock Court, and compiled two collections: A View of Devonshire, in which, after a general discussion on the history of the county, he gave a topographical account of its condition in about 1630; and the Pedigrees of most of our Devonshire Families, a compilation of genealogical information, deemed by later commentators as inaccurate and unreliable. The two works were published in Exeter in 1845, under the editorship of George Oliver and Pitman Jones.

He married Mary Roberts (died 1666), eldest daughter and coheiress of Richard Roberts of Combe Martin, Devon. By her he had one son and heir, Philip Westcott (1614-1647/8), and five daughters.

Westcote was buried at Shobrooke, the date of his death being uncertain, as the register of burials between May 1639 and July 1644 is missing.
