= 1497 =

1497 in various calendars
- Gregorian calendar: 1497; MCDXCVII
- Ab urbe condita: 2250
- Armenian calendar: 946; ԹՎ ՋԽԶ
- Assyrian calendar: 6247
- Balinese saka calendar: 1418–1419
- Bengali calendar: 903–904
- Berber calendar: 2447
- English Regnal year: 12 Hen. 7 – 13 Hen. 7
- Buddhist calendar: 2041
- Burmese calendar: 859
- Byzantine calendar: 7005–7006
- Chinese calendar: 丙辰年 (Fire Dragon); 4194 or 3987 — to — 丁巳年 (Fire Snake); 4195 or 3988
- Coptic calendar: 1213–1214
- Discordian calendar: 2663
- Ethiopian calendar: 1489–1490
- Hebrew calendar: 5257–5258
- Hindu calendars
- Vikram Samvat: 1553–1554
- Shaka Samvat: 1418–1419
- Kali Yuga: 4597–4598
- Holocene calendar: 11497
- Igbo calendar: 497–498
- Iranian calendar: 875–876
- Islamic calendar: 902–903
- Japanese calendar: Meiō 6 (明応６年)
- Javanese calendar: 1414–1415
- Julian calendar: 1497; MCDXCVII
- Korean calendar: 3830
- Minguo calendar: 415 before ROC 民前415年
- Nanakshahi calendar: 29
- Thai solar calendar: 2039–2040
- Tibetan calendar: མེ་ཕོ་འབྲུག་ལོ་ (male Fire-Dragon); 1623 or 1242 or 470 — to — མེ་མོ་སྦྲུལ་ལོ་ (female Fire-Snake); 1624 or 1243 or 471

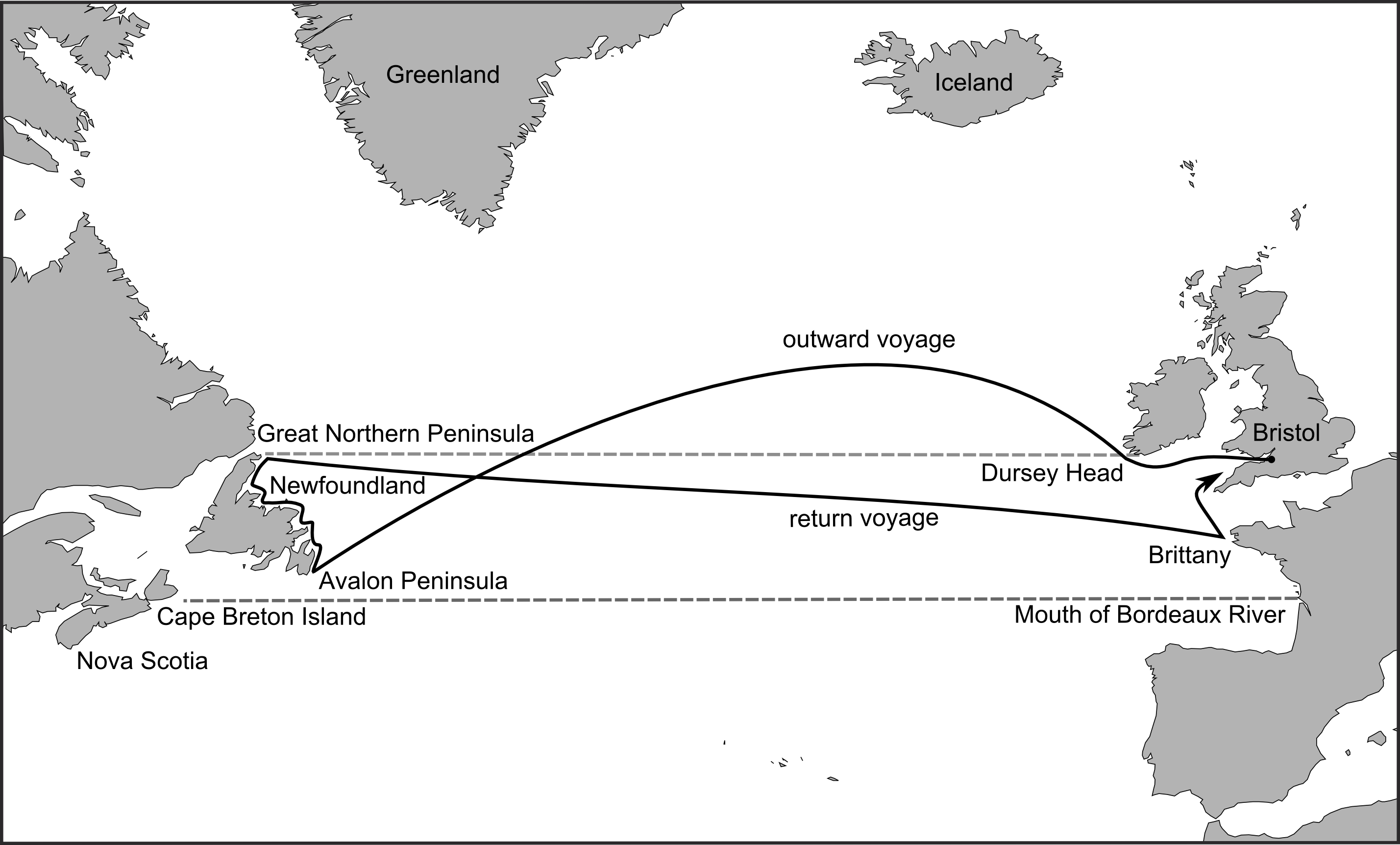
May 20 – John Cabot and crew begin their voyage to claim North America for England, arriving on June 24.

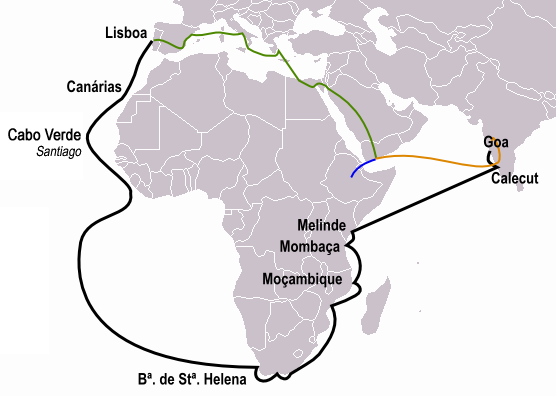
July 8 – Vasco da Gama and crew begin their journey to sail around southern Africa, rounding the Cape of Good Hope by November 22 on voyage to India.

The year 1497 (MCDXCVII) was a common year starting on Sunday of the Julian calendar.

== Events ==
=== January–March ===
- January 16 – At Westminster, King Henry VII opens his sixth English Parliament for a two-month session. The House of Commons elects Sir Thomas Englefield as its speaker.
- February 7 – At the public square in Florence, on Shrove Tuesday, followers of the charismatic Dominican friar and evangelist Girolamo Savonarola carry out the first "bonfire of the vanities" and burn thousands of artworks, books, clothing, mirrors, music instruments, playing cards and other objects deemed by them to be a temptation to sin.
- March 13 – King Henry VII of England gives royal assent to numerous acts passed as parliament adjourns, including the following:
  - Weights and Measures Act 1496, standardizing units of weight and of volume throughout England. Specifically, the smallest unit, the "sterling" is set at the weight of 32 corns of wheat, 20 sterlings are an ounce, 12 ounces are a pound. A gallon of wheat must weight 8 pounds Troy weight, and a 12-gallon bushel must weight 64 pounds.
  - Benefit of Clergy Act 1496, requiring that charges against a church official for treason must be tried in a government court of law. For other charges, clergymen may still have the benefit of being tried by an ecclesiastical court under canon law.
- March 3 – The Russo-Swedish War (1495–1497) ends with a six year truce signed in Russia at Novgorod. Due to gathering unrest at home, the Swedish leader Sten Sture the Elder is forced to offer a peace to Ivan III of Moscow.
- March 19 – Persecution of Jews and Muslims by Manuel I of Portugal: Forced conversion of Jews in Portugal begins.

=== April–June ===
- April 18 – Captain Andrea Loredan of the Republic of Venice departs southward on the Adriatic Sea on a large, heavily-armed warship with a crew of 450, with a mission of locating the Spanish Navarrese pirate Pedro Navarro.
- May 10 – Amerigo Vespucci allegedly leaves Cádiz, for his first voyage to the New World. The account of a voyage (lasting until October 15, 1498) is doubted because the only mention of it is in a letter written six years later, and the course described would have traveled across the land of Mexico and into the Pacific Ocean.
- May 12 – Pope Alexander VI excommunicates Girolamo Savonarola.
- May 20 – Italian-born explorer John Cabot sets sail from Bristol in England, on the ship Matthew (principally owned by Richard Amerike), looking for new lands to the west (some sources give a May 2 date).
- May – The Cornish Rebellion breaks out in England, incited by war taxes.
- June 13 – Ferdinand and Isabella, the Catholic Monarchs of Spain, issue the ordinance of Medina del Campo, creating a money system based on the copper maravedí, creating the peso of 34 maravedis. In the next three centuries, this system will dominate international payments. It will be used in almost all parts of the Americas and large parts of Asia. It is the basis for a number of modern currencies, including the U.S. dollar.
- June 17 – Battle of Deptford Bridge near London: Cornish rebels under Michael An Gof are soundly defeated by Henry VII.
- June 24 – John Cabot lands in North America (near modern-day Bonavista, Newfoundland).
- June 26 – The coronation of Federico di Trastamara, son of King Alfonso II, as King of Naples takes place at Barletta Cathedral.
- June 27 – At what is supposed to be a meeting at Nysa about a united front by the nobility of Poland against the Ottoman Empire, Nicholas II of Niemodlin (Mikołaj II Niemodlińsk), the Duke of Opole in Poland as well as ruler of the duchies of Niemodlin, Brzeg, and Strzelce, attempts to stab two of the other nobles attending, Casimir II, Duke of Cieszyn and the Bishop Jan IV Roth. Nicholas is beheaded the next day.

=== July–September ===
- July 8 – Vasco da Gama's fleet departs from Lisbon, beginning his expedition to India.
- September 7 – Second Cornish Uprising in England: Perkin Warbeck lands near Land's End; on September 10 he is proclaimed as King in Bodmin.
- September 28 – At the Battle of Rotebro, Hans, King of Denmark, defeats Sten Sture the Elder.
- September 30 – The Treaty of Ayton establishes a seven-year peace between England and Scotland.

=== October–December ===
- October – Persecution of Jews and Muslims by Manuel I of Portugal: Date under the decree of December 5, 1496, by which Portuguese Jews who have not converted are to be expelled from the country.
- October 4 – Leaders of the Second Cornish Uprising surrender to the King at Taunton; the following day, Warbeck, having deserted his army, is captured at Beaulieu Abbey in Hampshire.
- October 6 – Sten Sture the Elder agrees to recognize Hans, King of Denmark and of Norway as the rightful King of Sweden and ends his 27-year term as the Swedish Regent.
- October 18 – The nobles of Sweden's estates formally elect King Hans of Denmark and Norway as King of Sweden, restoring the power of the Kalmar Union.
- October 26 – Battle of the Cosmin Forest between the Kingdom of Poland and a coalition army led by Stephen the Great
- November 7 –
  - Portuguese explorer Vasco da Gama and his crew become the first Europeans to set foot on South African soil as the ship São Gabriel arrives at St Helena Bay and makes landfall.
  - Philibert II of Savoy (Filiberto II) becomes the new Duke of Savoy upon the death of his father, Philip II (Filippo II), who had reigned for only 19 months.
- November 22 – The Vasco da Gama expedition discovers the first sea route from Europe to India as he and his crew, on four ships, round the Cape of Good Hope.
- November 26 – The coronation of Hans of Denmark as King of Sweden takes place at Stockholm, as he adopts the regnal name of King Johann II of Sweden.
- December 16 – The Vasco da Gama expedition travels past the Great Fish River on South Africa's Eastern Cape and sails into previously unexplored waters in the Indian Ocean.
- December 23 – Sheen Palace is destroyed by fire. Henry VII of England rebuilds it as Richmond Palace.

=== Date unknown ===
- Ivan the Great of Russia issues his law code, the Sudebnik.
- The Ottomans give Russian merchants freedom of trade within the empire.
- Iamblichus' De mysteriis Aegyptorum edited by Marsilio Ficino is published.
- A famine "prevailed through all Ireland", according to the Annals of the Four Masters.

== Births ==
- February 16 – Philip Melanchthon, German humanist and reformer (d. 1560)
- February 19 – Matthäus Schwarz, German fashion writer (d. 1574)
- March – Giovanni Paolo I Sforza, Italian condottiero (d. 1535)
- April 2 – Georg Giese, German merchant (d. 1562)
- April 16 – Mōri Motonari, Japanese daimyō (d. 1571)
- April 17 – Pedro de Valdivia, Spanish conquistador (d. 1553)
- May 3 – Wilhelm IV of Eberstein, President of the Reichskammergericht (d. 1562)
- May 21 – Al-Hattab, Tripolitanian Muslim jurist (d. 1547)
- June 27 – Ernest I, Duke of Brunswick-Lüneburg (d. 1546)
- July 15 – Francis of Denmark, Danish prince (d. 1511)
- August 18 – Francesco Canova da Milano, Italian composer (d. 1543)
- September 10 – Wolfgang Musculus, German theologian (d. 1563)
- October 29 – Benedetto Accolti the Younger, Italian cardinal (d. 1549)
- date unknown
  - Jean Fernel, French physician (d. 1558)
  - Gonzalo de Sandoval, Spanish conquistador (d. 1528)
  - Margareta Eriksdotter Vasa, Swedish noblewoman (d. 1536)
  - Johann Wild, German preacher (d. 1554)
- probable
  - Francesco Berni, Italian poet (d. 1536)
  - John Heywood, English playwright (d. 1580)

== Deaths ==
- January 3 – Beatrice d'Este, Duchess of Milan (b. 1475)
- January 30 – Lê Thánh Tông, Emperor of Vietnam (b. 1442)
- February 6 – Johannes Ockeghem, Flemish composer (b. c. 1410)
- May 26 – Antonio Manetti, Italian mathematician and architect (b. 1423)
- June 14 – Giovanni Borgia, 2nd Duke of Gandía (assassinated) (b.1474)
- June 27
  - Michael An Gof, Cornish rebel leader (executed)
  - Thomas Flamank, Cornish rebel leader (executed)
- June 28 – James Tuchet, 7th Baron Audley (b. c. 1463)
- July – Estêvão da Gama, Portuguese explorer ( b. c. 1430)
- July 23 – Barbara Fugger, German banker (b. 1419)
- August 24 – Sophie of Pomerania, Duchess of Pomerania (b. 1435)
- October 4 – John, Prince of Asturias, only son of Ferdinand II of Aragon and Isabella I of Castile (b. 1478)
- November 7 – Philip II, Duke of Savoy (b. 1443)
- November 30 – Anna Sforza, Italian noble (b. 1476)
- date unknown
  - Al-Mutawakkil II, Caliph of Cairo
  - Al-Sakhawi, Egyptian scholar (b. 1428)
  - Albert Brudzewski, Polish astronomer (b. 1445)
  - Gentile de' Becchi, Bishop of Arezzo (b. 1420/1430)
- probable – Elia del Medigo, Italian philosopher (b. 1460)
