= Flamank =

Flamank is a surname. Notable people with the surname include:

- George Flamank (1904–1987), American football and basketball player and coach
- Gilbert Flamank (c. 1508–1573), English politician
- John Flamank (by 1486–1535/41), English politician
- Thomas Flamank (died 1497), lawyer & leader of the Cornish Rebellion
