= Humphrey Arundell =

English rebel leader

Arms of Arundel of Lanherne: Sable, six martlets argent

Humphrey Arundell (c. 1513 – 27 January 1550) of Helland in Cornwall, was the leader of Cornish forces in the Prayer Book Rebellion early in the reign of King Edward VI. He was executed at Tyburn in London after the rebellion had been defeated.

== Origins ==
He was the eldest son and heir of Roger Arundell (died 1536) of Helland, Cornwall, by his wife Johanna Calwoodleigh (died 1537), daughter and heiress of Humphry Calwoodleigh (attainted in 1497) of Calwoodleigh (modern Calverleigh) in Devon. Roger Arundell was a younger son of Sir Thomas Arundell (died 1485), Knight of the Bath, of Lanherne in Cornwall. Roger's eldest brother was the powerful John Arundell (1474–1545) of Lanherne, Receiver General of the Duchy of Cornwall.

== Career ==
He was born at Helland, near Bodmin in Cornwall, and was an experienced soldier. His maternal grandfather had been involved in the Perkin Warbeck rising against Henry VII in 1497. On the death of his parents in 1536 and 1537 he inherited large estates in both Cornwall and Devon. In 1549, Arundell became leader of the Cornish army which assembled first at Bodmin and was involved in the Cornish rebellion of 1549, which is also known as the Prayer Book Rebellion, against Edward VI. Previously he had been in charge of a small garrison on St Michael's Mount, which had defected to the rebels at the start of the campaign.

During the 1549 siege of Exeter, Arundell and his troops had little artillery and had taken some small calibre guns from Plymouth and other forts of the King, including those on St Michael's Mount, St Mawes Castle, Pendennis Castle and Trematon Castle. The Cornishmen outside the walls of Exeter made the statement "and so we Cornishmen, whereof certain of us understand no English, utterly refuse this new English".

[1550] the xxvii. day of [January], was draune from the tower of London un-to Tyborne iiii. persons, and there hongyd and quartered, and their quarteres sette abowte London on every gatte; thes was of them that dyd ryse in the West cuntre.

— Chronicle of the Grey Friars of London, 1852

At the battle of Sampford Courtenay, Arundell led a large contingent of rebels from the rear throwing the Royal troops into confusion. The rebels were forced to make another stand at Okehampton, before falling back to Launceston, where he was finally overpowered and imprisoned in the castle. On 19 August, he was transferred to the dungeons of Rougemont Castle in Exeter, before being taken with other rebels to the Tower of London in September. In November 1549, Arundell was taken to Westminster Hall where he was found guilty of high treason and condemned to be taken back to the Tower and later hanged, drawn and quartered. He was executed on 27 January 1550 and the estates of the ringleaders were distributed to those who had served the King in the rising. Sir Gawen Carew received most of Humprey Arundell's lands.

Other Cornish leaders of the earlier Cornish Rebellion of 1497, Thomas Flamank, Michael An Gof and James Tuchet, 7th Baron Audley had also been executed at Tyburn in 1497.

== Marriage ==
He married Elizabeth Fulford (died 1565), a daughter of Sir John Fulford (1503–1544) of Great Fulford in Devon, twice Sheriff of Devon in 1534 and 1540, by his wife Dorothy Bourchier, a daughter of John Bourchier, 1st Earl of Bath (1470–1539), of Tawstock, Devon. He appears to have died without children. Elizabeth Fulford survived him and remarried to Thomas Carey (died 1583) of Cary in the parish of St Giles on the Heath in Devon.

== See also ==
- Prayer Book Rebellion
