= Flamoke =

Flamoke is a surname. Notable people with the surname include:

- Gilbert Flamoke (c. 1508–1573), English politician
- John Flamoke (by 1486–1535/41), English politician
