= Cornish Rebellion =

Cornish Rebellion may refer to:

- Cornish Rebellion of 1497
- Cornish Rebellion of 1549
