= Battle of Sampford Courtenay =

Battle in the Western Rebellion of 1549

Coordinates: 50.793°N 3.934°W

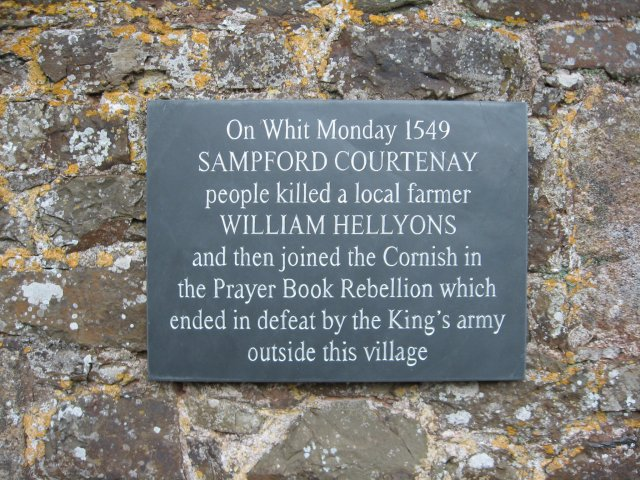
Plaque in Sampford Courtenay

The Battle of Sampford Courtenay was one of the chief military engagements in the Western Rebellion of 1549.

== Preparations ==
By mid August 1549, Humphrey Arundell, the leader of the rebel troops, regrouped his forces at Sampford Courtenay, Devon, when he received a promise that 1,000 men from Winchester would join his force. This would be the site of the fifth and final battle of the Prayer Book Rebellion. Unknown to Arundell, there was an informer in his camp – his own secretary John Kessell, who had been supplying intelligence of Arundell’s movements and plans to President of the Council of the West, John Russell, 1st Earl of Bedford, from the start.

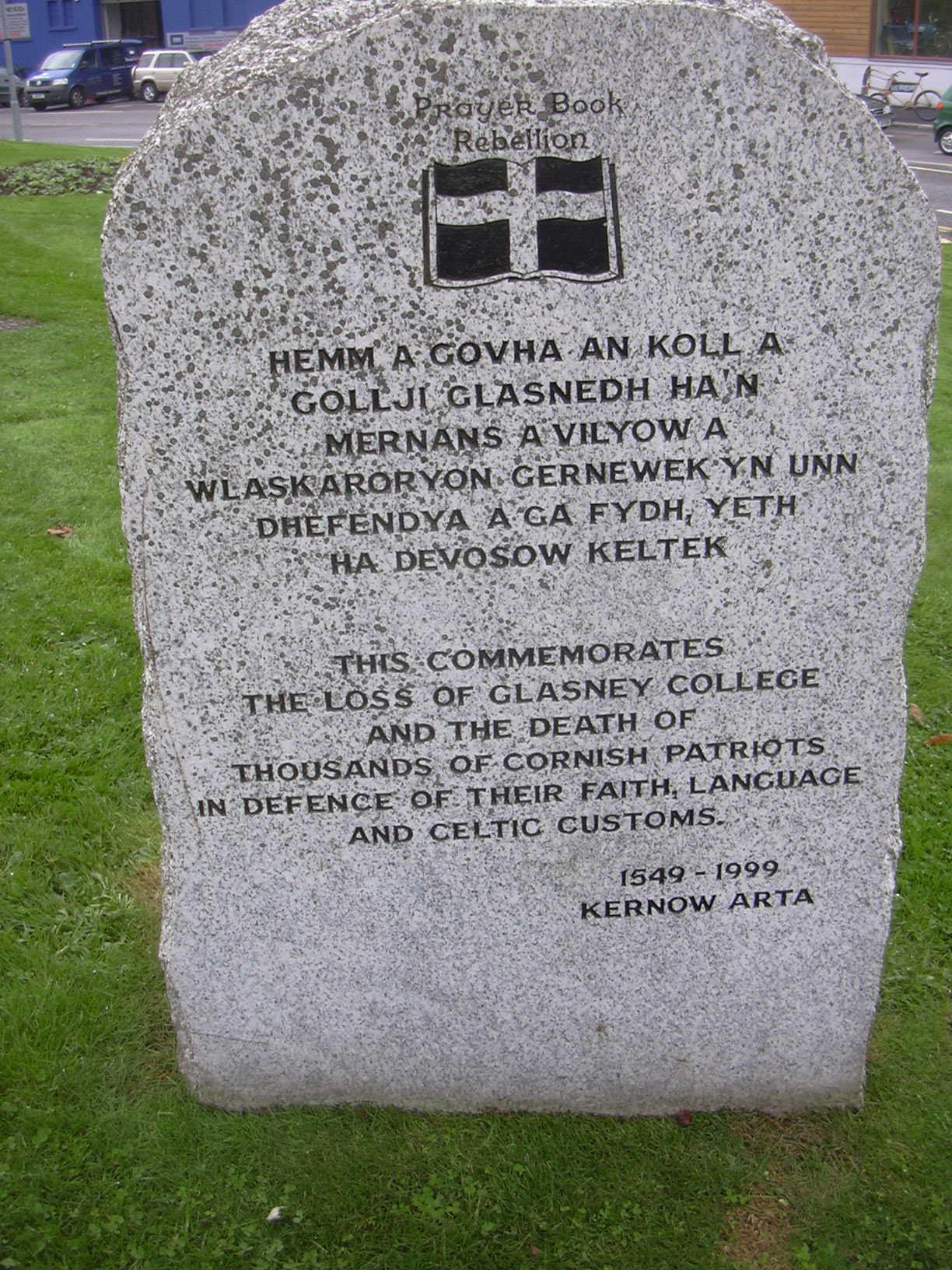
Monument marking the defeat of Cornish forces

Russell was under the impression that the rebels from Devon and Cornwall had been defeated already and the news interrupted his plans to send 1,000 men into the South West by ship to cut off his enemy’s retreat. His own forces had been further strengthened by the arrival of a force under Provost Marshal Sir Anthony Kingston. He now had an army of more than 8,000, vastly outnumbering what remained of his opposition.

Russell moved his forces out on 16 August, camping overnight at Crediton. On the next morning, scouts from both sides bumped into each other, resulting in a skirmish and the capture of a Cornish captain named Maunder.

With the 1,000 men from Winchester failing to materialise, the main force of the rebel army had dug in on high ground just outside Sampford Courtenay, while a detachment led by Humphrey Arundell waited in the village itself. They knew that this was to be their last stand and the rebels were on their own against Russell’s army, which outnumbered them greatly.

== Events of the battle and its aftermath ==
Lord Russell opted for a three-pronged approach. Heavy divisions led by Lord Grey and Sir William Herbert stormed the rebel encampment, while Russell himself would follow behind. This was not as simple as Russell had envisaged: the rebel camp being more strongly manned than he had thought. A vicious gun battle, lasting roughly an hour, gave time for Russell’s two other divisions to make their move. One consisted of the Italian arquebusiers under Spinola, the other being the German Landsknechte. With almost the entire government force ranged against them, the rebels withdrew into the village where they came under heavy bombardment.

Once again, the battle might have been won for the Cornish and West Devonians had they possessed any cavalry.

Contemporary Exeter historian John Hooker wrote that the rebel army would not surrender until most of their number had been slain or captured. Lord John Russell was quoted that his army had killed between five and six hundred enemy and his pursuit of the rebel retreat killed a further seven hundred.

The Devon men made a vain attempt to find safety in Somerset but, one by one, they were caught and mostly hanged, drawn and quartered by troops led by Sir Peter Carew and Sir Hugh Paulet. The Cornishmen headed for home but tried one final time to stand against Russell at Okehampton. Russell planned another attack but in the morning, he received news from the informer, Kessell, that the Cornish forces had been decimated and that the remaining Cornishmen were now back across the River Tamar.
