= Bodiniel =

Coordinates: 50.4789°N 4.7388°W

Bodiniel: Cornish: Bodynyal
- Location within Cornwall
- OS grid reference: SX058680
- Civil parish: Helland
- Unitary authority: Cornwall
- Ceremonial county: Cornwall
- Region: South West
- Country: England
- Sovereign state: United Kingdom
- Post town: BODMIN
- Postcode district: PL31
- Dialling code: 01208
- Police: Devon and Cornwall
- Fire: Cornwall
- Ambulance: South Western
- UK Parliament: North Cornwall

Bodiniel (Cornish: Bodynyal, meaning Bleak/Desolate Dwelling) is a group of small settlements in Cornwall, United Kingdom one mile (1.6 km) north of Bodmin town centre. It is in the civil parish of Helland.

The settlements are three farmstead hamlets (Bodiniel, Middle Bodiniel, and Higher Bodiniel) on high ground overlooking the River Camel valley.
