= Gilbert Flamank =

16th-century English politician

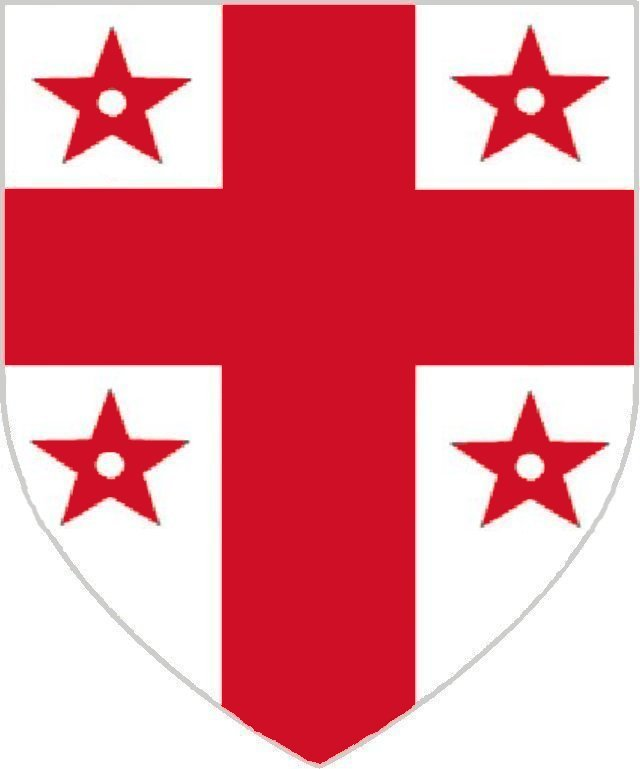
- Flamank of Boscarne:- argent, a cross between four mullets pierced gules

M.P. for Bodmin
- In office 1529–1536
- Monarch: Henry VIII

Personal details
- Born: bef.1508
- Died: 1573
- Spouse: Joan Gayer
- Children: 7 sons & 2 daughters
- Parent(s): John Flamank; Jane Nanfan

Gilbert Flamank or Flamoke (c. 1508–1573), of Boscombe near Bodmin, Cornwall, was an English politician.

== Ancestry ==
He was the son of the Bodmin MP John Flamank and Jane daughter of Sir Richard Nanfan, Deputy Lieutenant of Calais and Esquire of the King's Body and nephew of Thomas Flamank, co-leader of the Cornish Rebellion of 1497.

== Career and Life ==
He was a Member of Parliament (MP) for Bodmin in 1529.

== Family and descendants ==
Gilbert married Joan daughter of Reginald Gayer of Liskeard by Alice, daughter of Edward Courtenay of Landrake and had the following issue-

- 7 sons
- 2 daughters
