= Michael An Gof =

One of the leaders of the Cornish Rebellion of 1497

- Mighal Josep an Gov
- Born: Michael Joseph
- Died: June 27, 1497; Tyburn
- Monuments: Statue at St Keverne
- Occupation: Blacksmith
- Known for: Cornish rebellion of 1497

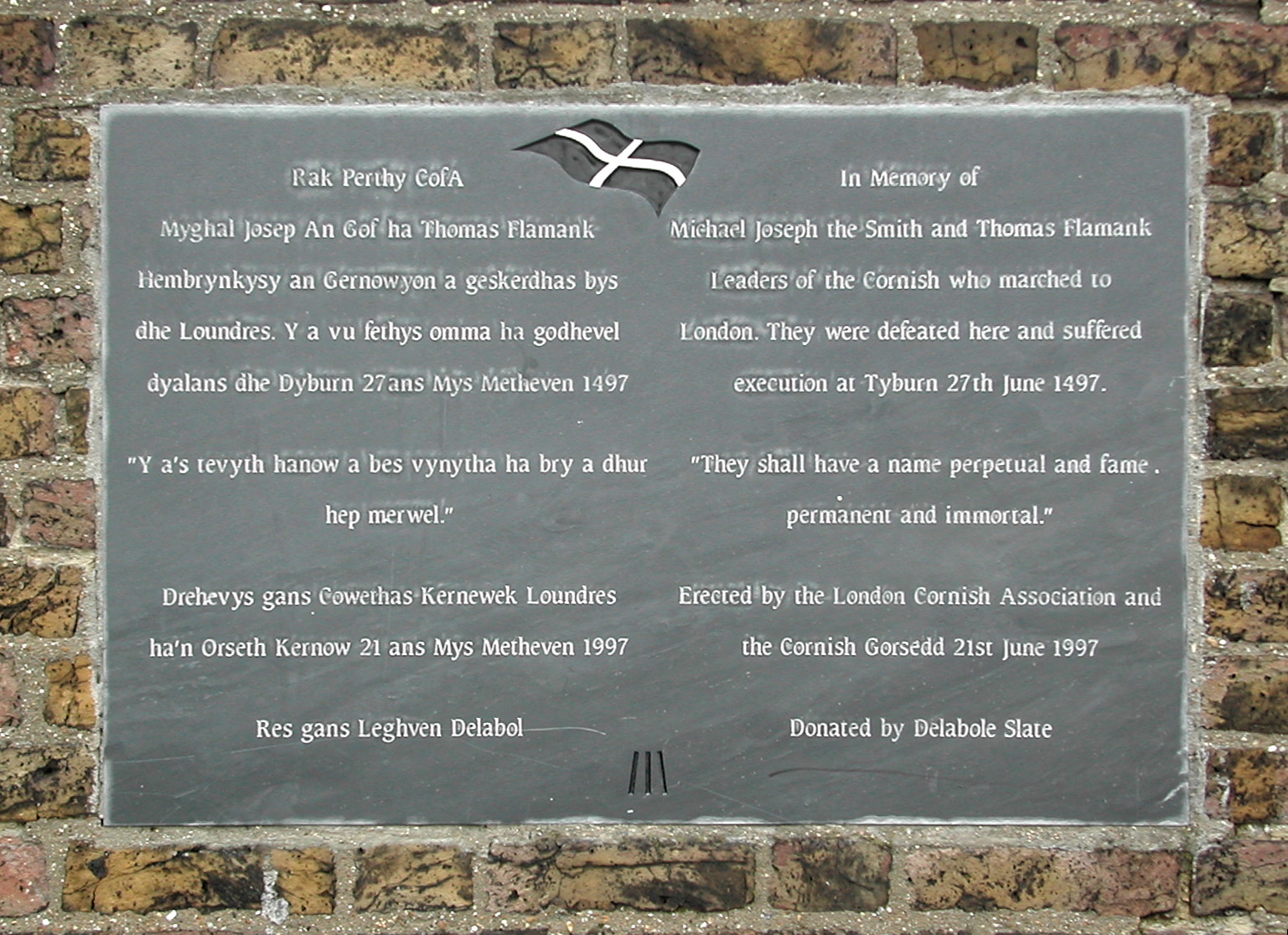
Commemorative plaque in Cornish and English for Michael Joseph the Smith (An Gof) and Thomas Flamank mounted on the north side of Blackheath Common, south east London, near the south entrance to Greenwich Park.

Michael Joseph (died 27 June 1497), better known as Michael An Gof, was one of the leaders of the Cornish rebellion of 1497, along with Thomas Flamank.

== Background ==
The rebels marched on London to protest against King Henry VII's levy of a tax to pay for an invasion of Scotland in response to the Scots' support of the pretender Perkin Warbeck. The Cornish believed that this was a northern affair and had nothing to do with them; they also believed that the tax was the work of the King's corrupt counsellors and marched to London to bring this to the King's attention.

== March on London ==
A blacksmith (An Gof) named Michael Joseph lived at St Keverne on the Lizard peninsula. He is described as "a notable prating fellow who by thrusting himself forward on every occasion, and being loudest in every complaint against the government, acquired an authority among these simple people, and was ready to lead them to any desperate enterprise".

Michael Joseph was chosen by the people of St. Keverne to challenge the tax. When he and his followers reached Bodmin, they were joined by Thomas Flamank, a local lawyer. Flamank argued that it was the business of the barons of the north to defend the Scottish border, and that the tax was illegal. He suggested that the Cornishmen should march on London and present a petition to the king setting forth their grievances against the advisers responsible for the king's action.

Under the leadership of Flamank and Joseph, about 6,000 Cornishmen assembled at Bodmin and set out. The army attracted support in provisions and recruits along the way and by the time it reached Devon numbered some 15,000 strong. Up until then the march had been relatively peaceable, but when they reached Taunton in Somerset, Provost Perrin, an officer and commissioner who was collecting the tax, was killed.

They hoped to gain support from people in Kent – the focus of Jack Cade's rebellion of 1450 – but despite heading to Cade's former rallying site at Blackheath they gained little backing.

The Cornish rebels were defeated by the King's forces at the Battle of Deptford Bridge on 17 June 1497 on a site adjacent to the River Ravensbourne. Michael fled to Greenwich after the battle, but was captured and sent to the Tower of London.

As one of the leaders, Michael An Gof was executed with Flamank on 27 June 1497. A 16th-century source relates that they suffered the highest penalty for traitors: to be hanged, drawn and quartered. But an even earlier authority states that they were hanged until dead before being beheaded and quartered. Their heads were displayed on London Bridge and their quarters at other locations. While being pulled on a hurdle toward his execution, An Gof is reported to have said that he would have "a name perpetual and a fame permanent and immortal".

In 1997, the 500th anniversary of the rebellion, a commemorative march ("Keskerdh Kernow 500") was held, retracing the route of the original march from St. Keverne (An Gof's home town in Cornwall) to London. A statue depicting An Gof and Flamank was unveiled in St Keverne and a commemorative plaque was unveiled on the wall of Greenwich Park facing Blackheath common. Russell Pascoe composed 'The Martyrdom of An Gof' for the end of the march, which was performed at The Barbican in June 1997.

== Other uses ==
The name "An Gof" is from the Cornish for "the blacksmith". It is the origin of the British surname Angove. Cognates include "Gow" and "Gowan" and the Irish/Scottish McGowan.

The Holyer An Gof trophy is an annual award for the best publication on Cornwall, and part of the Cornish Gorsedd (Gorsedh Kernow).

An Gof's name was later used by a Cornish nationalist extremist organisation.

An Gof was the name of a rock group who performed a song on the album Keltia Rok in 1987.

== See also ==
- List of topics related to Cornwall
- Second Cornish Uprising of 1497
- Prayer Book Rebellion
- The Wikipedia Cornwall Portal
