= Johann Wild =

German Franciscan scriptural commentator and preacher

Johann Wild (Ferus) (1497 – 8 September 1554) was a German Franciscan scriptural commentator and preacher.

== Life ==
Wild was born in Swabia. At an early age he joined the Franciscan Order. He was educated at Cologne. At a chapter held in the Convent at Tübingen in 1528, he was appointed professor of rhetoric and belles-lettres, scriptor, and preacher. His sermons in the churches of Mainz soon gained a high reputation for learning and eloquence.

Subsequently, at a chapter celebrated in the Convent at Mainz in 1540, he was elected definitor of the province and appointed to the arduous post of Domprediger (preacher in the cathedral), which he continued to occupy till his death.

It was partly due to his preaching that Mainz remained Catholic. Not even his opponents disputed his title of being the most learned preacher in Germany in the sixteenth century. The Protestant historian, Henry Pantaleon, said of him:

"His days and nights were spent in the fulfillment of his sacred functions and in study, so that he became a most learned theologian. To profound learning and rich eloquence he united great sanctity of life".

When the troops of Albert of Brandenburg, burning and pillaging as they went, entered Mainz in 1552, priests, religious, and most of the inhabitants fled from the city. Father Wild remained. His courage was greatly admired by Albert, who solicited him to give up the religious habit. "For many years", he answered, "I have worn it, it has never done me any harm, why should I now abandon it?" He was ordered to preach in the presence of Albert and his followers on the text, "Render to Caesar the things that are Caesar's", etc. At the end of his discourse he addressed his audience on the text, "Render an account of thy stewardship". The prince was so struck by his apostolic zeal and courage that he promised to grant him any request he would make. He asked that the cathedral and Franciscan buildings should be spared from all desecration and injury. His request was granted, and in recognition of this a statute representing Wild holding the cathedral in his hand was placed in the treasury.

Wild is mentioned as present at the chapter held at the Convent of Pforzheim on 15 April 1554. He died at Mainz, the same year, and was buried in the front of the high altar in the Franciscan Church at Mainz.

== Works ==
His principal works are commentaries on the Pentateuch, Josue, Judges, Job, Ecclesiastes, Psalms 31 and 60, Esther, Esdras, Nehemias, Lamentations of Jeremias, Jonas, St. Matthew, St. John, Acts of the Apostles, Romans, I John; six vols. of sermons; examination of candidates for Sacred Orders. Also sermons, orations, and ascetical works. His method in explaining the Holy Scripture was to oppose to the quotations of the Lutherans a learned commentary drawn up from the Church Fathers.

Nearly all his works were published after his death, and had not been composed with a view to publication. With the exception of the Commentaries on Matthew, John, and I John, his other works were placed on the Index with the clause donec corrigantur. Dominicus a Soto, O.P., extracted from the Commentary of St. John seventy-seven passages which he considered susceptible to false interpretation. He was answered by Michael Medina, O.S.F., who had been theologian with Dominicus at the Council of Trent. Sixtus Senensis, Nicholas Serarius, Luke Wadding, and many others state that the works of Wild were deliberately altered by the Lutherans to deceive the Catholics. In the Roman edition of the Commentary on St. John, the passages criticized were left out.
