= Helland =

Village in Cornwall, England

Coordinates: 50.508°N 4.717°W

Helland: Cornish: Hellann
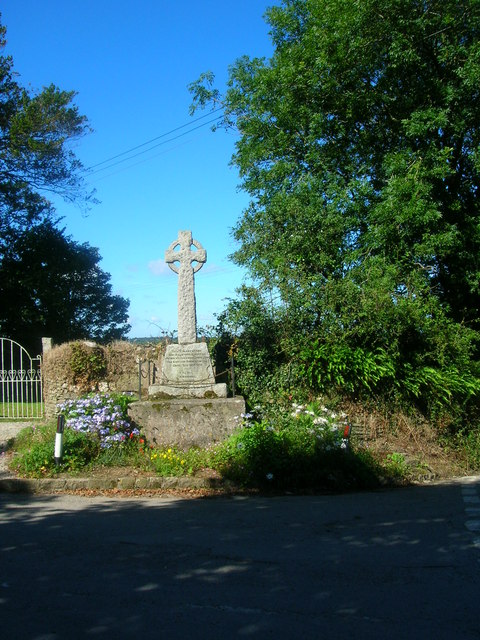
- War Memorial Helland Next to this "Great War" memorial, with three names on it, the road to the right runs down to Hellandbridge

- Location within Cornwall
- Population: 204 (Civil Parish, 2011)
- OS grid reference: SX074710
- Civil parish: Helland
- Unitary authority: Cornwall
- Ceremonial county: Cornwall
- Region: South West
- Country: England
- Sovereign state: United Kingdom
- Post town: BODMIN
- Postcode district: PL30
- Dialling code: 01208
- Police: Devon and Cornwall
- Fire: Cornwall
- Ambulance: South Western
- UK Parliament: North Cornwall

Helland (Cornish: Hellann) is a civil parish and village in Cornwall, England, United Kingdom. It is situated 2 1/2 miles (4.0 km) north of Bodmin. The meaning of the name Helland is unclear: it is possible that the origin is in Cornish hen & lan (i.e. old church). The original dedication of the church is unknown but St Helena is now recognised as the patron.

The village is referred to in the Domesday Book as Henland. It was only valued at 10 shillings and only five households are recorded, with one virgate of arable land, 4 acres (16,000 m^{2}) of woodland and 20 of pasture.

Grade II listed Helland Bridge, built in the early 15th century crosses over the River Camel here.

Lancarffe is a house probably built in the 17th century which is a Grade II* listed building (at Grid ref. SX0825268948).

The parish has 2,483 acres (10.05 km^{2}) of land.

== Parish church ==
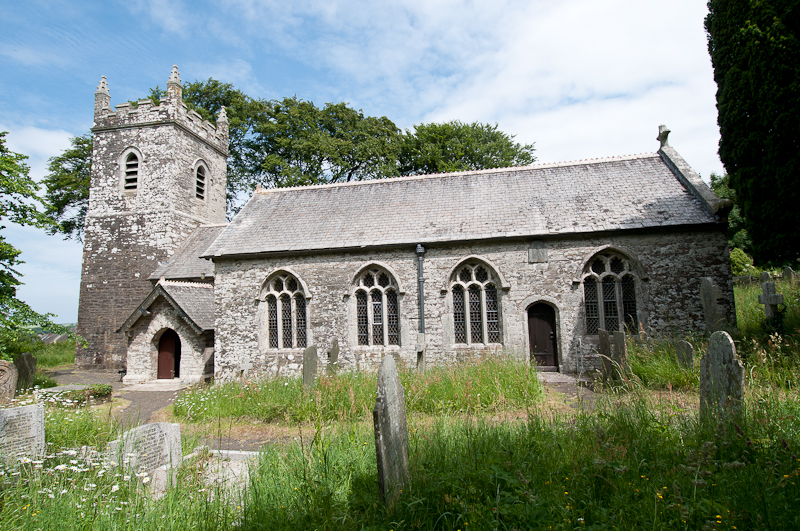
Helland Parish Church

The parish church is dedicated to St Helena, who was the mother of Constantine I. The church comprises a chancel, nave and south aisle. The tower has a pyramidal roof and had a single bell. The church is pre-Norman in origin but the oldest stonework is probably of the 13th century; however in the mid 17th century the tower became ruinous and has not been entirely rebuilt. The name of St Sinney was attached to a tenement on the southern border of the parish; the Giffards were in medieval times the patrons of the rectory and resident not far from the church.

== Notable people ==
- Humphrey Arundell (c. 1513 – 1550), the leader of the Prayer Book Rebellion
- Robert Glynn (1719–1800), an English physician, known as a generous eccentric.
