= John Flamank =

16th-century English politician

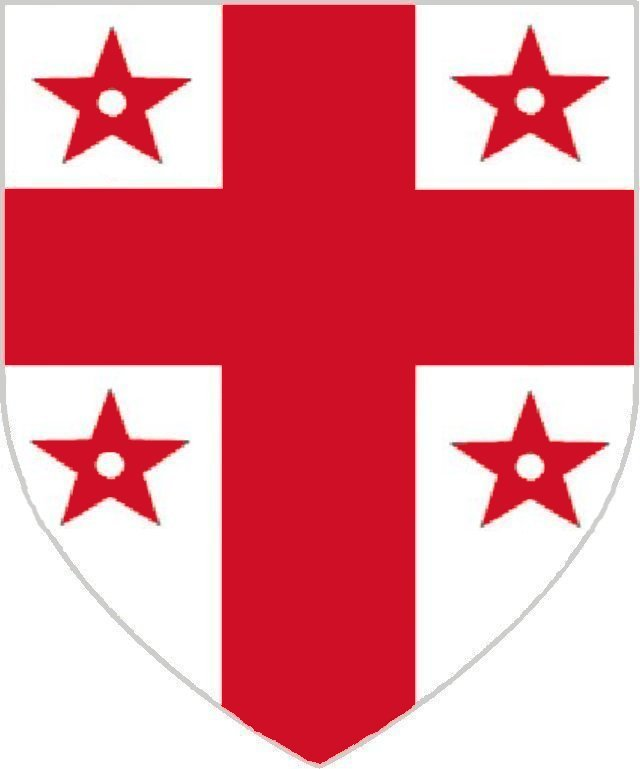
- Flamank of Boscarne:- argent, a cross between four mullets pierced gules

M.P. for Bodmin
- In office 5 February 1515 – 22 December 1515
- Monarch: Henry VIII

Personal details
- Born: bef. 1486
- Died: 1540
- Spouse: Jane Nanfan
- Children: Gilbert Flamank; John Flamank; Henry Flamank; Roger Flamank
- Parent(s): Richard Flamank; Jane Luccombe

John Flamank or Flamoke (by 1486 – 1535/41), of Boscarne, near Bodmin, Cornwall, was an English politician.

== Ancestry ==
He was the son of Richard Flamank and Jane, daughter of Thomas Luccombe of Bodmin. His elder brother was Thomas Flamank, co-leader of the Cornish Rebellion of 1497.

== Career and life ==
John served as a man-at-arms at Calais in 1507 before acting as Member of Parliament (MP) for Bodmin in 1515.

He was a Commissioner of Subsidy for Cornwall in 1523 and was appointed Mayor of Bodmin in 1525 and 1534.

In 1526 he served as a Yeoman Usher in the Royal Household and as Usher of the Kings Chamber in 1538.

Flamank died in 1540.

== Family and descendants ==
John married Jane, daughter of Sir Richard Nanfan, Deputy Lieutenant of Calais and Esquire of the King's Body. They had the following issue:

- Gilbert Flamank, MP for Bodmin in 1529
- John Flamank
- Henry Flamank
- Roger Flamank
