= Mark Stoyle =

British historian

Mark Stoyle FRHistS is an English historian of the Tudor and Stuart periods, specialising in the English Civil War, the history of witchcraft, and the history of the South West peninsula. He is professor at the University of Southampton, and has published many works on the history and landscape of Exeter where he previously lived and taught.

== Biography ==
Mark Stoyle was raised in Mid Devon and attended school in Crediton. Upon finishing school, he took part in archaeological excavations in Exeter for some years. He received a BA in history in 1988. In 1992, he was awarded his doctorate at St Peter's College, Oxford under the supervision of Gerald Aylmer. After completing a Scouloudi Fellowship at the Institute of Historical Research and a British Academy Postdoctoral Research Fellowship at the University of Exeter, he was appointed to a post at the University of Southampton where he is presently Professor of Early Modern History. In 2012, he won a Vice-Chancellor's Teaching Award from the University of Southampton, and has gone on to receive a number of similar awards.

Stoyle is a fellow of the Royal Historical Society. He served on the Council of the Royal Historical Society from 2013 to 2016, and chaired its Research Support Committee. He has also served as a member of the editorial advisory panel of BBC History and as a member of the editorial board of the Victoria County History.

Stoyle has appeared on many television and radio programmes in the UK, together with others in the US, Australia, and Canada. These include The World at One, The Long View, Who Do You Think You Are?, Word of Mouth, Making History, The Great British Story, Walking Tudor Britain, Great British Railway Journeys, Underground Worlds, Songs of Praise, The Antiques Road Trip, and Bargain Hunt. His research into the history of witchcraft in Exeter has also attracted a considerable amount of media attention and been discussed in most of the main national newspapers in the UK (see, for example, West Country witchcraft and the hanged women of urban Exeter in The Guardian, on BBC Radio 4's Today programme, and in 2024, on the BBC news website).

In 2024, Stoyle acted as the Historical Consultant for Sarah Dickenson's new stage-play, The Commotion Time, which had its world premiere at Exeter Northcott Theatre that October. The play subsequently received a five-star review in The Stage, the leading industry journal, which described it as a "mesmerising" piece of work.

== Major publications ==
- Loyalty and Locality: Popular Allegiance in Devon During the English Civil War (1994)
- From Deliverance to Destruction: Rebellion and Civil War in an English City (1996)
- Devon and the Civil War (2001)
- West Britons: Cornish Identities and the Early Modern British State (2002)
- Circled With Stone: Exeter's City Walls, 1485-1660 (2003)
- Soldiers and Strangers: An Ethnic History of the English Civil War (2005)
- The Black Legend of Prince Rupert's Dog: Witchcraft and Propaganda During the English Civil War (2011)
- Water in the City: The Aqueducts and Underground Passages of Exeter (2014)
- Witchcraft in Exeter (2017)
- A Murderous Midsummer: The Western Rising of 1549 (2022)
- Remembering the English Civil Wars (2022, co-edited with Lloyd Bowen)
