= Thomas Flamank =

Cornish lawyer and rebel

- Tommas Flamank
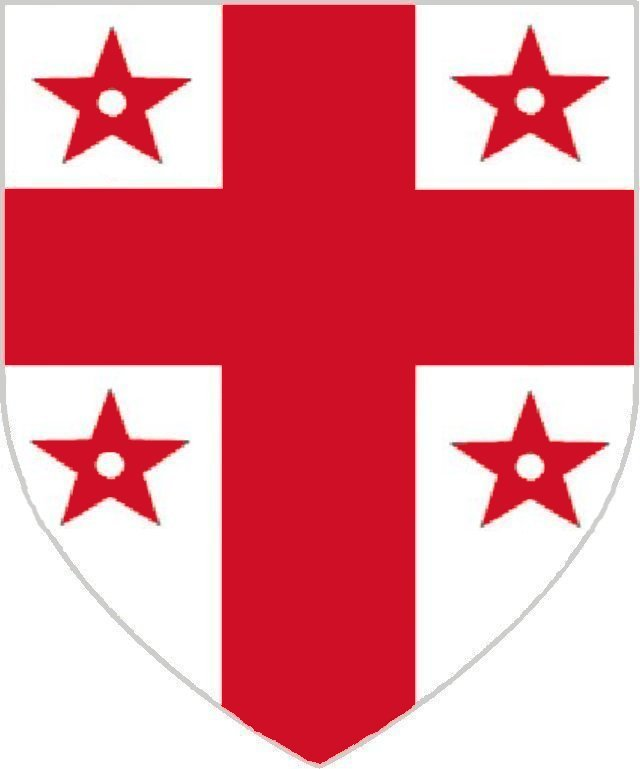
- Flamank of Boscarne: argent, a cross between four mullets pierced gules
- Died: 27 June 1497; Tyburn, England
- Occupation: Lawyer
- Known for: Co-leader of the Cornish Rebellion of 1497

Thomas Flamank (died 27 June 1497) was a lawyer and former MP from Cornwall, who together with Michael An Gof led the Cornish rebellion of 1497, a protest against taxes imposed by Henry VII of England.

== Ancestry ==
He was the eldest son of Richard Flamank or Flammock of Boscarne, by Johanna or Jane, daughter of Thomas Lucombe of Bodmin, and older brother of John Flamank, MP for Bodmin in 1515. Thomas Flamank himself had been MP for Bodmin in 1492. The family is of great antiquity at Bodmin, having held the manor of Nanstallon in uninterrupted succession from the fourteenth to the nineteenth century (1817). In early times the name appeared as Flandrensis, Flemang, Flammank, and in other forms Thomas Flamank married Elizabeth, daughter of John Trelawny of Menwynick, and had a daughter Joanna, wife of Peter Fauntleroy.

== Life ==
In 1497 Henry VII was attempting to raise a subsidy in Cornwall for the despatch of an army to Scotland to punish James IV for supporting Perkin Warbeck. Michael Joseph, a blacksmith, was chosen by the people of St. Keverne to challenge the tax. When he and his followers reached Bodmin, they were joined by Thomas Flamank, whose father was one of the commissioners appointed to supervise the tax collection. Flamank argued that it was the business of the barons of the north, and of no other of the king's subjects, to defend the Scottish border, and that the tax was illegal. He suggested that the Cornishmen should march on London and present a petition to the king setting forth their grievances, and urging the punishment of Archbishop Morton and Sir Reginald Bray, and other advisers of the king who were held responsible for his action.

As the Cornishmen proceeded into Devon, they were joined by others sympathetic to their cause. At Wells, James Tuchet, 7th Baron Audley, joined them and undertook the leadership. They marched towards London by way of Salisbury and Winchester. London was panic-stricken; but the rebels had grown disheartened by the lack of support shown them in their long march. Giles Daubeny, 8th Baron Daubeny, was directed to take the field with the forces which had been summoned for service in Scotland, a force numbering about 8,000 men.

By 16 June 1497, the Cornish army of about 9,000 had arrived at Blackheath. Daubeny was joined by the king and some of the nobles and gentry from nearby counties. The next morning battle was joined at Deptford Strand. After a fierce skirmish, Daubeny took Deptford Bridge and he and his troops moved onto the Heath. Daubeny, outdistancing his men, was taken prisoner, but soon released. Fighting continued and the Cornish found themselves surrounded. Although they fought bravely, they were a mob without artillery or cavalry against a trained and well-equipped army. The Cornish were soon put to flight.

Audley was beheaded at Tower Hill. Flamank and Joseph were hanged and beheaded at Tyburn (27 June), and their limbs exhibited in various parts of the city. Most of their followers were pardoned.

As noted in the above-mentioned vernacular history of the Cornish, when faced with being sentenced to death Thomas Flamank is recorded as having uttered the last words "Speak the Truth and only then can you be free of your chains".

== Family and descendants ==
He married Elizabeth Trelawny and had the following issue-

- Joan Flamank, m. Peter Fauntleroy

== Legacy ==
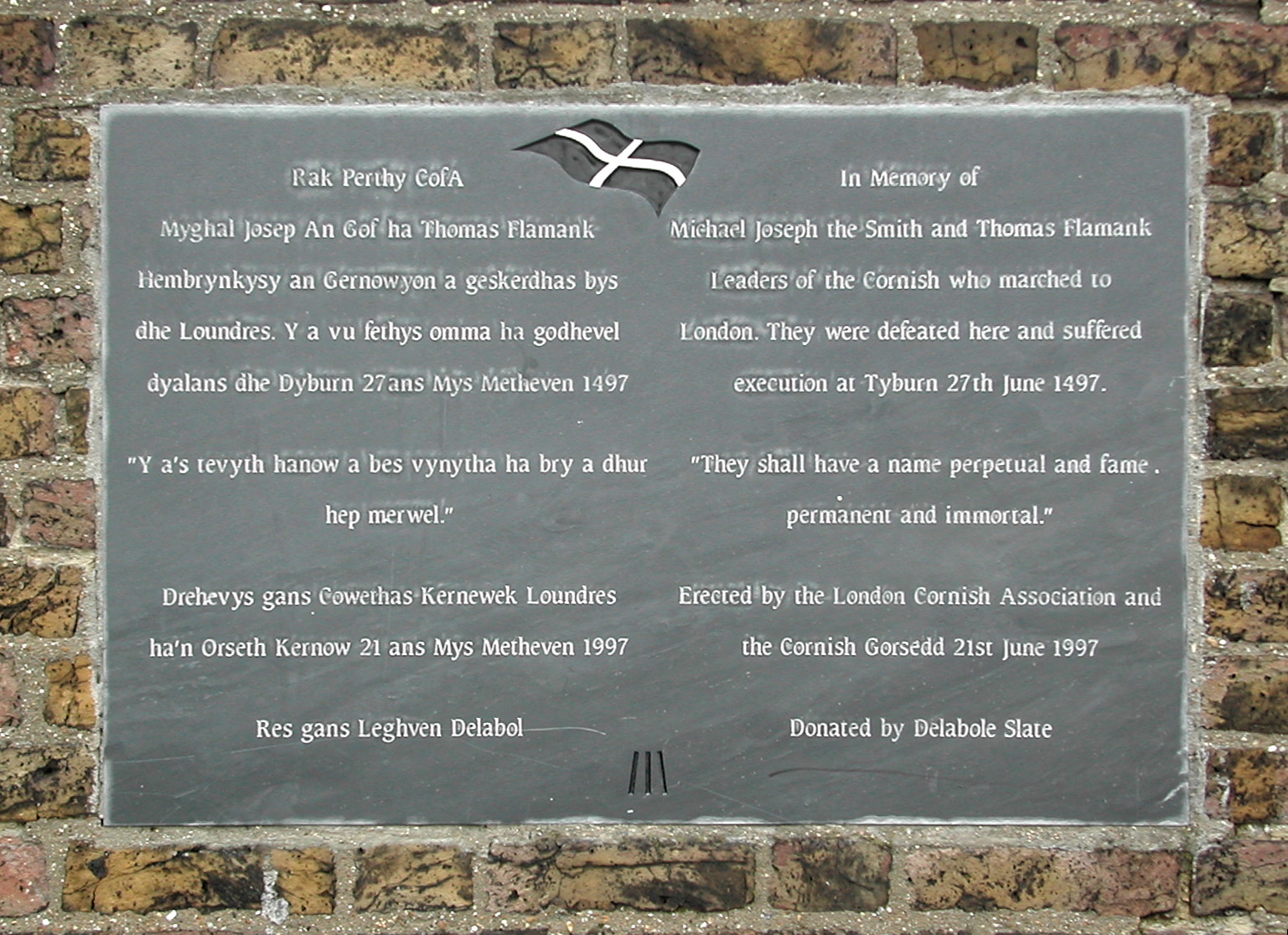
Commemorative plaque in Cornish and English for Michael Joseph the Smith (An Gof) and Thomas Flamank mounted on the north side of Blackheath Common, southeast London, near the south entrance to Greenwich Park

In 1997, the five-hundredth anniversary of the Rebellion, a commemorative march ("Keskerdh Kernow 500") was held, retracing the route of the original march from St. Keverne in Cornwall to London. A statue depicting An Gof and Flamank was unveiled in St. Keverne and a commemorative plaque was unveiled on Blackheath Common, and another, en route, at Guildford at the location of a preliminary skirmish.

Flamank, played by John Castle, appeared as a character in the ninth episode of the 1972 BBC television series The Shadow of the Tower, which focused on the reign of Henry VII.

== See also ==
- List of topics related to Cornwall
- Second Cornish Uprising of 1497
- Prayer Book Rebellion
