= Second Cornish uprising of 1497 =

Military conflict

Second Cornish uprising
Date	4 October 1497
Location	Whitesand Bay
Result	Royal victory

Belligerents
Kingdom of England	Cornish gentry and Yorkists

Commanders and leaders
Henry VII; Giles, Lord Daubeny	Perkin Warbeck (executed) as 'Richard IV'

Strength
	6,000

The Second Cornish uprising occurred in September 1497 when the pretender to the throne Perkin Warbeck landed at Whitesand Bay, near Land's End, on 7 September with just 120 men in two ships.

== Promises to stop extortionate taxes ==
Warbeck had seen the potential of the Cornish unrest in the First Cornish rebellion of 1497 even though the Cornish had been defeated at the Battle of Deptford Bridge on 17 June 1497. Warbeck proclaimed that he would put a stop to extortionate taxes levied to help fight a war against Scotland and was warmly welcomed in Cornwall. His wife, Lady Catharine, was left in the safety of St Michael's Mount and when he decided to attack Exeter his supporters declared him ‘Richard IV’ on Bodmin Moor. Most of the Cornish gentry supported Warbeck's cause after their setback previously in June of that year and on 17 September a Cornish army some 6,000 strong entered Exeter, where the walls were badly damaged, before advancing on Taunton.

== Panic and capture of Warbeck ==
Henry VII sent his chief general, Giles, Lord Daubeney, to attack the Cornish and when Warbeck heard that the King's scouts were at Glastonbury he panicked and deserted his army. Warbeck was captured at Beaulieu Abbey in Hampshire, where he surrendered. Henry VII reached Taunton on 4 October 1497, where he received the surrender of the remaining Cornish army. The ringleaders were executed and others fined an enormous total of £13,000. 'King Richard' was imprisoned, first, at Taunton, then in London, where he was ‘paraded through the streets on horseback amid much hooting and derision of the citizens’. On 23 November 1499 Warbeck was drawn on a hurdle from the Tower to Tyburn, London, where he read out a ‘confession’ and was hanged.

== See also ==
- Battle of Stoke Field
- Cornish rebellion of 1497
