= Prayer Book Rebellion =

Popular revolt in Cornwall and Devon in 1549

- Part of European wars of religion and the English Reformation
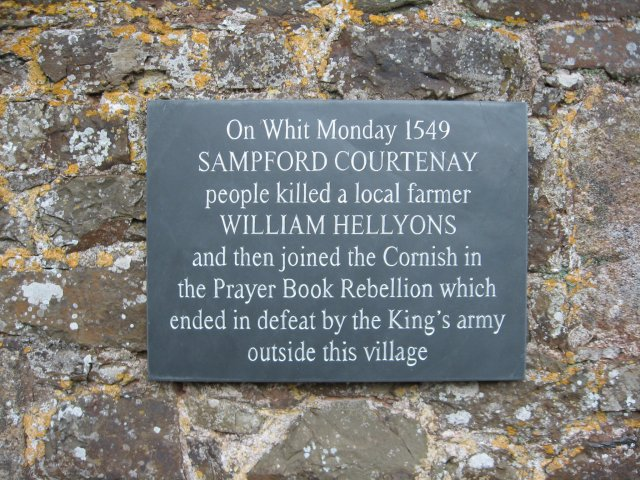
- Memorial plaque in Sampford Courtenay
Date	6 June – 17 August 1549
Location	Cornwall and Devon
Result	Victory for Edwardian forces: Rebellion suppressed; Execution of rebel commanders

Belligerents
Southwestern Catholics	Kingdom of England

Commanders and leaders
Sir Humphrey Arundell, Arundel of Lanherne (executed); John Winslade, Esquire of the White Spur (executed); John Bury, Bury of Devon (executed); Robert Welch, Vicar of St Thomas, Exeter (executed)	Edward VI; Edward Seymour; John Russell; Anthony Kingston; Sir William Francis, of Somerset †

Strength
~7,000 rebels	~8,600 troops

Casualties and losses
At least 2,000 killed Unknown wounded	At least 300 killed Unknown wounded
- ~5,500 deaths

The Prayer Book Rebellion or Western Rising was a popular revolt in Cornwall and Devon in 1549. In that year, the first Book of Common Prayer, presenting the theology of the English Reformation, was introduced. The change was widely unpopular, particularly in areas where firm Catholic religious loyalty (even after the Act of Supremacy in 1534) still existed, such as Lancashire.

The enforcement of English-language (as opposed to Latin) church services in Cornish-speaking areas also provoked discontent. Coupled with poor economic conditions, this led to an explosion of anger in Cornwall and Devon, initiating an uprising. In response, Edward Seymour, 1st Duke of Somerset, sent John Russell to suppress the revolt, with the rebels being defeated and its leaders executed two months after the beginning of hostilities. Up to 5,500 men were killed, mainly Cornish and Devonian Catholics.

== Background ==
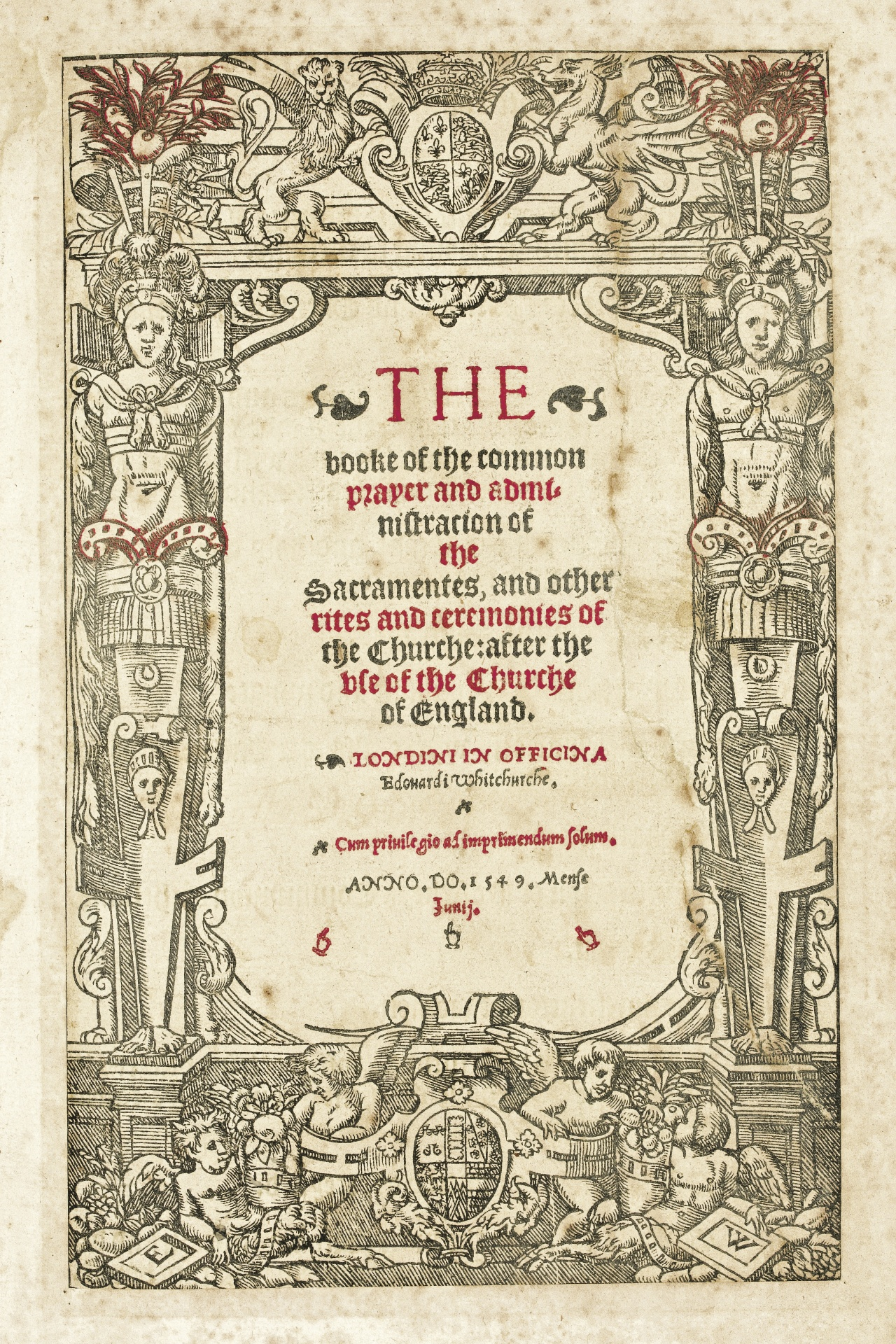
Cranmer's Prayer book of 1549

One probable cause of the Prayer Book Rebellion was the religious changes recently implemented by the government of the new king, Edward VI. In the late 1540s, Somerset, on behalf of the young king, introduced a range of legislative measures as an extension of the English Reformation in England and Wales, with the primary aim of changing theology and practices, particularly in areas of traditionally Catholic religious loyalty – for example, in Cornwall and Devon. When traditional religious processions and pilgrimages were banned, commissioners were sent out to remove all symbols of Catholicism, in line with Thomas Cranmer's religious policies favouring Protestantism ever more. In Cornwall, this task was given to William Body, whose perceived desecration of religious shrines led to his murder on 5 April 1548 by William Kylter and Pascoe Trevian at Helston.

This pressure on the lower classes was compounded by the recent poll tax on sheep. This would have affected the region significantly, with the West Country being an area of sheep farming. Rumours circulating that the tax would be extended to other livestock might have increased the discontent. A damaged social structure then meant this local uprising was not sufficiently dealt with by nearby landowners. The Marquess of Exeter, a large landowner in Sampford Courtenay, had recently been attainted. His successor, Lord Russell, was based in London and rarely came out to his land. It is possible this created a lack of local power that would have normally been expected to quell the revolt.

The Cornish had long regarded themselves as a distinct territory of the Kingdom of England, a belief which was reinforced by the Cornish language's central role as an expression of ethnic identity; as such, the Reformation, with its emphasis on the usage of English, was seen as a threat to the Cornish national identity. After the Cornish rebellion of 1497 and the subsequent destruction of monasteries from 1536 through to 1545 under King Henry VIII had brought an end to the formal scholarship, supported by the monastic orders, that had sustained the Celtic Cornish and the Catholic Devonian cultural identities. The dissolution of Glasney College and Crantock College as well as Tavistock Abbey in Devon played a significant part in fomenting opposition to future cultural reforms.

It has been argued that the Catholic Church had "proved itself extremely accommodating of Cornish language and culture" and that government attacks on the traditional religion had reawakened the spirit of defiance in Cornwall, and in particular the majority Cornish-speaking far west. Immediate retribution followed with the execution of twenty-eight Cornishmen at Launceston Castle. One execution of a "traitor of Cornwall" occurred on Plymouth Hoe – town accounts gave details of the cost of timber for both gallows and poles. Martin Geoffrey, the pro-Catholic priest of St Keverne, near Helston, was taken to London. After Geoffrey's execution, his head was impaled on a staff erected upon London Bridge as was customary.

== Sampford Courtenay and the immediate beginnings of the uprising ==
Sampford Courtenay is where the rebellion started, and where the rebels were defeated.

The new prayer book was not uniformly adopted and in 1549, the Act of Uniformity made it unlawful to use the Latin liturgical rites from Whitsunday 1549 onwards. Magistrates were given the task of enforcing the change. Following the enforced change on Whitsunday, on Whitmonday the parishioners of Sampford Courtenay in Devon compelled their priest to revert to the old service. The rebels argued that the new English liturgy was "but lyke a Christmas game." This claim was probably related to the book's provision for men and women to file into the quire on different sides to receive the sacrament, which seemed to remind the Devon men of country dancing. Justices arrived at the next service to enforce the change. An altercation at the service led to a proponent of the change (William Hellyons) killed by being run through with a pitchfork on the steps of the church house.

Following this confrontation, a group of parishioners from Sampford Courtenay decided to march to Exeter to protest at the introduction of the new prayer book. As the group of rebels moved through Devon, they gained large numbers of Catholic supporters and became a significant force. Marching east to Crediton, the Devon rebels laid siege to Exeter, demanding the withdrawal of all English liturgies. Although a number of the inhabitants in Exeter sent a message of support to the rebels, the city refused to open its gates. The gates were to stay closed because of the siege for over a month.

=== "Kill all the gentlemen" ===
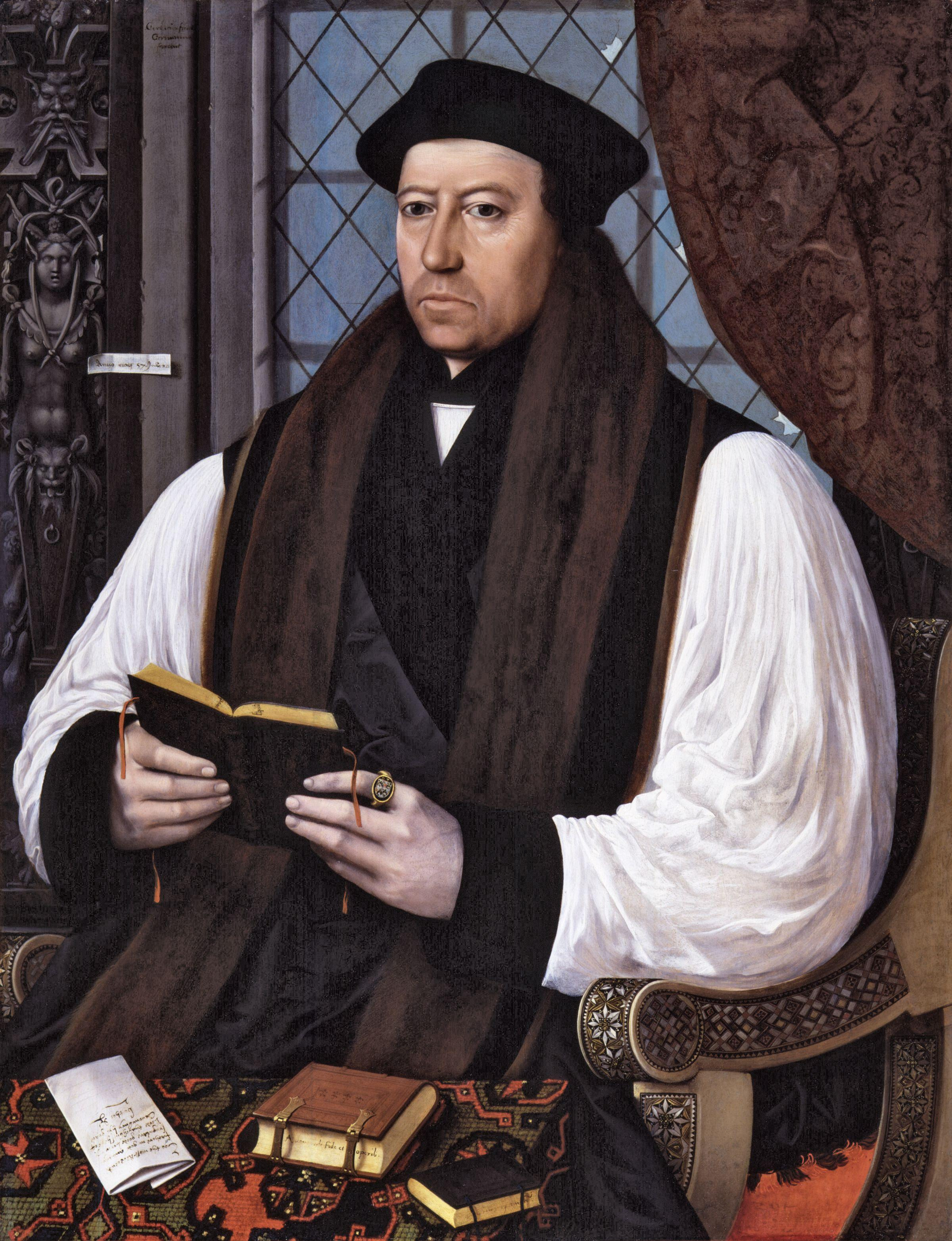
Thomas Cranmer, chief author of the Book of Common Prayer

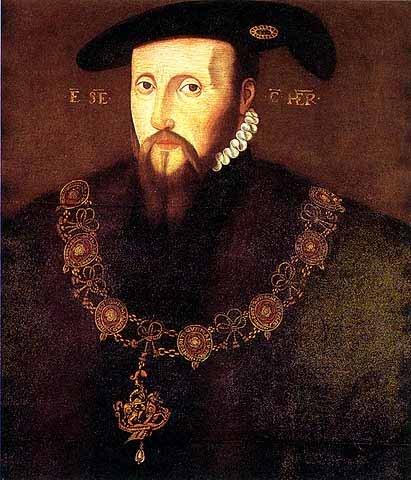
The response of Edward Seymour, 1st Duke of Somerset, was swift and crushing.

In Cornwall and Devon, the issue of the Book of Common Prayer proved to be the final indignity that the people could peaceably bear. Two decades of unpopular government policies were followed by two years of rampant inflation, in which wheat prices had quadrupled. Along with the rapid enclosure of common lands, the attack on the Church, which was felt to be central to the rural community, led to an explosion of anger. In Cornwall, an army gathered at the town of Bodmin under the leadership of its mayor, Henry Bray, and two staunch Catholic landowners, Sir Humphrey Arundell of Helland and John Winslade of Tregarrick.

Many of the gentry sought protection in old castles. Some shut themselves in St Michael's Mount where they were besieged by the rebels who started a bewildering smoke-screen by burning trusses of hay. This, combined with a shortage of food and the distress of women, forced them to surrender. Sir Richard Grenville found refuge in the ruins of Trematon Castle. Deserted by many of his followers, the old man was enticed outside to parley. He was seized and the castle ransacked. Sir Richard and his companions were imprisoned in Launceston gaol. The Cornish army then proceeded to march east across the Tamar border into Devon to join with the Devon rebels near Crediton.

The religious aims of the rebellion were highlighted in the slogan "Kill all the gentlemen and we will have the Six Articles up again, and ceremonies as they were in King Henry's time." However, it also implies a social cause (a view supported by historians such as Guy and Fletcher). That later demands included limiting the size of households belonging to the gentry – theoretically beneficial in a time of population growth and unemployment – possibly suggests an attack on the prestige of the gentry. Certainly such contemporaries as Thomas Cranmer took this view, condemning the rebels for deliberately inciting a class conflict by their demands: "to diminish their strength and to take away their friends, that you might command gentlemen at your pleasures". Protector Somerset himself saw dislike of the gentry as a common factor in all of the 1549 rebellions: "indeed all hath conceived a wonderful hate against the gentlemen and taketh them all as their enemies."

The Cornish rebels were also concerned with the use of the English language in the new prayer book. The language-map of Cornwall at this time is quite complicated, but philological studies have suggested that the Cornish language had been in territorial retreat throughout the Middle Ages. Summarising the research, Mark Stoyle says that by 1450, the county was divided into three main linguistic blocs: "West Cornwall was inhabited by a population of Celtic descent, which was mostly Cornish speaking; the western part of East Cornwall was inhabited by a population of Celtic descent, which had largely abandoned the Cornish tongue in favor of English; and the eastern part of East Cornwall was inhabited by a population of Anglo-Saxon descent, which was entirely English speaking." This tripartite model is however not borne out by modern genetic evidence which shows distinctly Cornish and Devonian genetic identities separate from, but closely related to, both each other and the 'Anglo-Saxon' English.

The West Cornish, outraged by the introduction of English in their 1549 services, wrote the Demands of the Western Rebels, the eighth Article of which states: "...and so we the Cornyshe men (whereof certen of us understande no Englysh) utterly refuse thys newe Englysh". Responding to this, however, Archbishop Cranmer asked why the Cornishmen should be offended by holding the service in English rather than Cornish when they had before held it in Latin and not understood that. Anthony Fletcher points out that the uprising was motivated above all by religious and economic issues and not by the matter of language.

== Confrontations ==
In London, King Edward VI and his privy council became alarmed by this news from the West Country. On instructions from the Lord Protector Somerset, one of the Privy Councillors, Sir Gawen Carew, was ordered to pacify the rebels. At the same time, Lord John Russell was ordered to take an army to impose a military solution.

The rebels were of many different backgrounds, some farmers, some tin miners, and some fishermen. Cornwall appears to have had a significantly larger militia than other areas of a similar size. Rebels utilized the Banner of the Five Wounds which was adopted during the Pilgrimage of Grace as a symbol of popular Roman Catholic rebellions against the monarchy.

=== Crediton confrontation ===
As the rebels approached Exeter, Devonian knights Sir Gawen and Sir Peter Carew were sent to negotiate with the Devon rebels at Crediton. They found their approaches blocked and they were attacked by longbowmen. Shortly before, the Cornish rebels arrived and Arundell had to divide his combined force, sending one force to Clyst St Mary to assist the villagers and the other with the main army to advance upon Exeter, where it besieged the city for 5 weeks.

=== Siege of Exeter ===
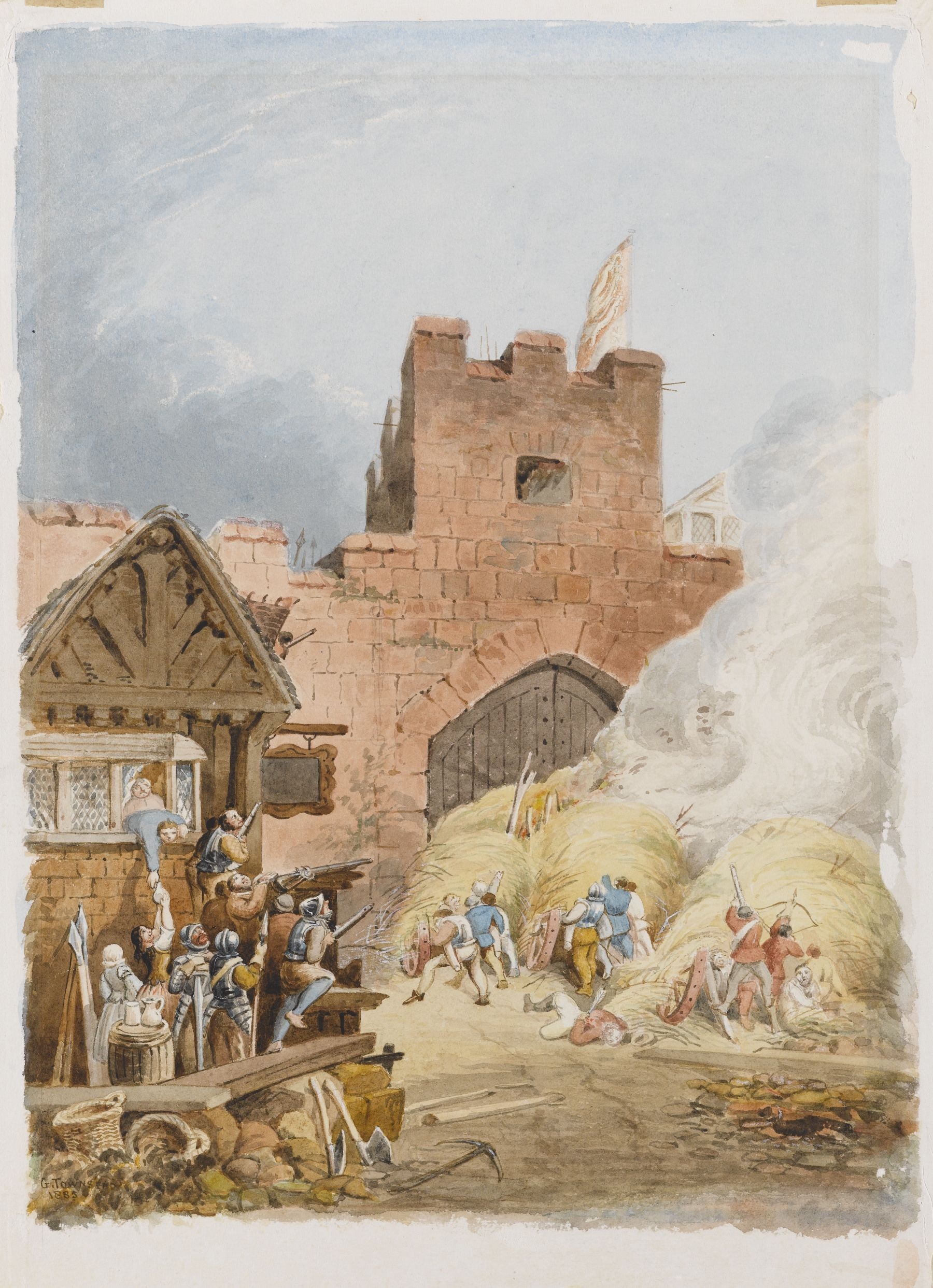
Painting by George Townsend depicting the Siege of Exeter and the West Gate, created in 1885.

The rebel commanders unsuccessfully tried to persuade John Blackaller, Exeter's pro-Catholic mayor, to surrender the town. The city gates were closed as the initial force of some 2,000 men gathered outside.

=== Battle of Fenny Bridges ===
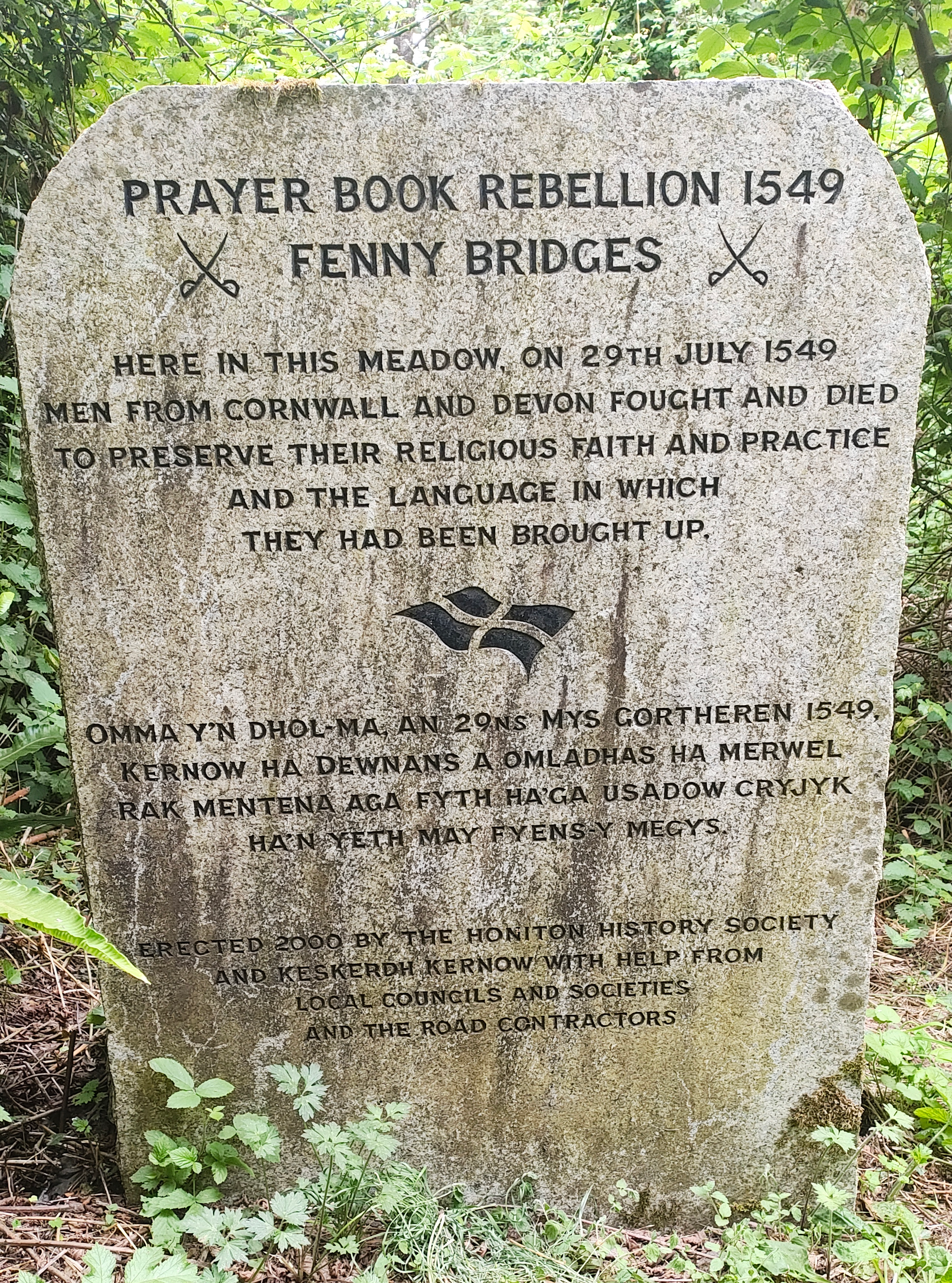
Bilingual memorial in East Devon commemorating those who died in the Battle of Fenny Bridges.

On 2 July, Lord John Russell, 1st Earl of Bedford's initial force had reached Honiton. It included 160 Italian arquebusiers, under the command of Lord William Grey. With promised reinforcements from Wiltshire and Gloucestershire, Russell would have had more than 8,600 men, including a cavalry force of 850 men, all of whom were well armed and well trained. Russell had estimated the combined rebel forces from Cornwall and Devon at only 7,000 men. On 28 July, Arundell decided to block their approach to Exeter at Fenny Bridges. The result of this conflict was inconclusive. Approximately 300 men on each side were reported to have died, and Lord Russell and his army returned to Honiton.

=== Battle of Woodbury Common ===
Lord Russell's reinforcements arrived on 2 August and his army of 5,000 men began a march upon Exeter, westward, across the downs. Russell's advance continued on to Woodbury Common where they pitched camp. On 4 August, the rebels attacked, but the result was inconclusive with large numbers of prisoners taken by Lord Russell.

=== Battle of Clyst St Mary ===
Arundell's forces re-grouped with the main contingent of 6,000 soldiers at Clyst St Mary, but they were attacked by a central force led by Sir William Francis on 5 August. After a ferocious battle, Russell's troops gained the advantage and left a thousand Cornish and Devonians dead and many more taken prisoner.

The highest-ranking casualty of the rebellion was a certain William Francis who died at a "Fight at Carey's Windmill" possibly referring to Battle of Clyst St Mary or Battle of Clyst Heath. His title implies that he was a gentry and most probably knighted, and was leading the foremost division, leaving the road which he first marched, took now one that was both deep and narrow; when the rebels, being upon the banks on each side of the road, beat him with stones striking his headpiece, and as the result he died.

=== Clyst Heath massacre ===
Russell pitched camp on Clyst Heath where he had up to 900 bound and gagged rebel prisoners killed, with their throats slit in 10 minutes, according to the chronicler John Hayward.

=== Battle of Clyst Heath ===
When news of the atrocity reached Arundell's forces, a new attack took place early on 6 August. Lord Grey later commented that he had never seen the like nor taken part in such a murderous fray. As he had led the charge against the Scots in the Battle of Pinkie Cleugh, this was a telling statement. Some 2,000 soldiers had died at the battle of Clyst Heath. A group of Devon men went north, up the valley of the Exe, where they were overtaken by Sir Gawen Carew who left the corpses of their leaders hanging on gibbets from Dunster to Bath.

=== Relief of Exeter ===
Lord Russell continued his attack with the relief of Exeter. In London, a proclamation was issued, allowing the lands of those involved in the uprising to be confiscated. Arundell's estate was transferred to Sir Gawen Carew, and Sir Peter Carew was rewarded with John Winslade's estate in Devon. Robert Welch (or Welsh), the vicar of St Thomas near Exeter, was hanged by chains from his own church tower by Russell's forces, as were other priests.

=== Battle of Sampford Courtenay ===
Lord Russell was under the impression that the rebels had been defeated, but news arrived that Arundell's army was re-grouping at Sampford Courtenay. This interrupted his plans to send 1,000 men into Cornwall by ship to cut off his enemy's retreat. Russell's forces were strengthened by the arrival of a force under Provost Marshal Sir Anthony Kingston. His army now numbered more than 8,000, vastly outnumbering what had remained of his opposition. Lord Grey and Sir William Herbert led the attack, and the contemporary Exeter historian John Hooker wrote that "the Cornish would not give in until most of their number had been slain or captured". Lord John Russell reported that his army had killed between five and six hundred rebels, and his pursuit of the Cornish retreat had killed a further seven hundred.

== Aftermath ==
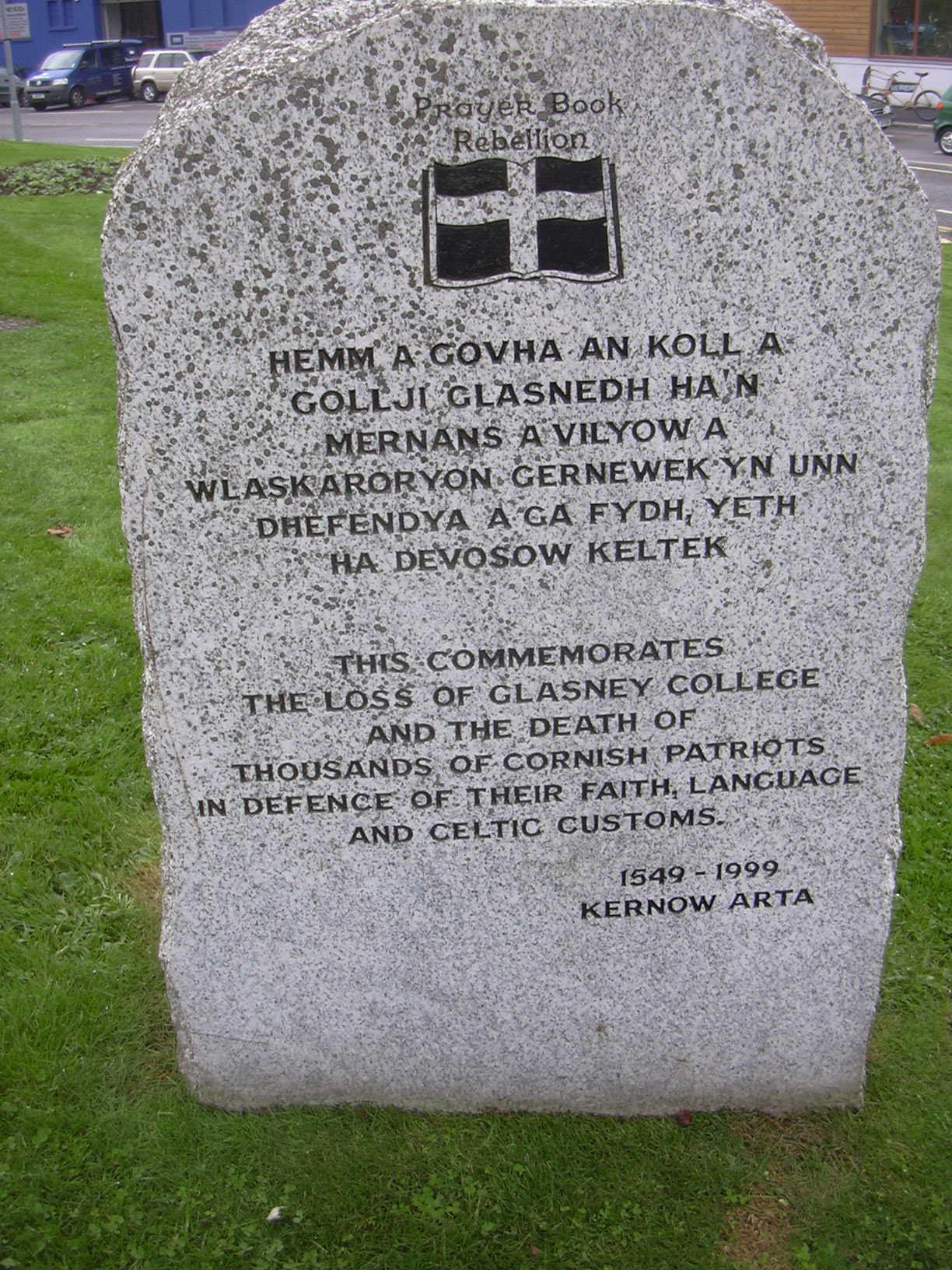
A memorial erected to those involved in the rebellion in Penryn, Cornwall near Glasney College.

Many involved in the rebellion initially escaped the grasp of government forces, including Arundell, who fled to Launceston. There, he was captured and taken to London together with Winslade, who was caught at Bodmin. Arundell was found guilty of treason, hanged, drawn and quartered, and his landholdings taken by Carew. In total, an estimated 5,500 people died during the rebellion.

Further orders were issued on behalf of the king by the Duke of Somerset and Archbishop Thomas Cranmer to government forces, instructing them to carry out pacification operations the West Country under the leadership of Sir Anthony Kingston. Kingston subsequently ordered the executions of numerous individuals suspected of involvement with the rebellion as part of the post-rebellion reprisals. These included figures such as mayor of Bodmin Nicholas Boyer, portreeve of St Ives John Payne and mayor of Gluvian William Mayow, the latter of which was hanged outside a tavern in St Columb. Several priests were hanged, including Richard Bennett (vicar of St Veep and St Neot) and Simon Morton (vicar of Poundstock and the curate of Pillaton).

In the aftermath of the rebellion, the government came to associate the Cornish language with sedition and "backwardness". This was one of the reasons why the Book of Common Prayer was never translated into Cornish (unlike Welsh), as proposals to do so were suppressed in the rebellion's aftermath. The failure to translate the Book of Common Prayer into Cornish was a contributing factor to the language's rapid decline during the 16th and 17th centuries, to the point that by 1700, Cornish had become an endangered language.

In June 2007, Bishop of Truro Bill Ind was awarded the Trelawny Plate, an award given to people seen as making an "outstanding contribution to Cornish life". During his acceptance of the award, Ind made a speech in which he apologised for the suppression of the rebellion, stating that "I am often asked about my attitude to the Prayerbook Rebellion and in my opinion, there is no doubt that the English Government behaved brutally and stupidly and killed many Cornish people. I don't think apologising for something that happened over 500 years ago helps, but I am sorry about what happened and I think it was an enormous mistake."

== See also ==
- Cornish Rebellion of 1497
- Buckinghamshire and Oxfordshire Rising of 1549, which took place at the same time and for the same reasons as the Prayer Book Rebellion
- Pilgrimage of Grace
- Rising of the North
- Religion in the United Kingdom
- Jenny Geddes, precipitator of a later rebellion in Scotland leading to the Wars of the Three Kingdoms including the English Civil War
- List of topics related to Cornwall
- History of Devon
- Cornish nationalism

== Bibliography ==
=== Primary sources ===
- Holinshed, Raphael (1586) The ... Chronicles, comprising the description and historie of England, the description and historie of Ireland, the description and historie of Scotland; first collected and published by Raphaell Holinshed, William Harrison, and others. Now newlie augmented and continued (with manifold matters of singular note and worthie memorie) to the yeare 1586 by John Hooker, alias Vowell Gent, and others. 3 vols. London: John Harrison, 1586–87 (includes an account of the rebellion by John Hooker)
- John Hooker, Description of the citie of Excester, ed. Walter J. Harte, J. W. Schopp and H. Tapley-Soper, (Devon and Cornwall Record Society Publications, vol. 11), 3 pts., Exeter: Devon and Cornwall Record Society, 1919–1947
- Nicholas Pocock, (ed.), Troubles connected with the Prayer Book of 1549, Camden Society, new series, vol. 37, 1884

=== Secondary sources ===
- Arthurson, Ian. "Fear and loathing in west Cornwall: seven new letters on the 1548 rising," Journal of the Royal Institution of Cornwall, new series II, vol. 3, pts. 3/4, 2000, pp. 97–111
- Aston, Margaret, "Segregation in church," in: W. J. Sheils and Diana Wood, (eds.), Women in the Church, (Studies in Church History, 27), Oxford: Basil Blackwell, 1990, pp. 242–281.
- Beer, B. L. "London and the Rebellions of 1548–1549." Journal of British Studies, 12.1 1972, pp. 15–38. online
- Charlesworth, Andrew, ed. An atlas of rural protest in Britain 1548–1900 (Taylor & Francis, 2017).
- Cornwall, Julian. The Revolt of the Peasantry, 1549, London: Routledge & Kegan Paul, 1977
- Couratin, A.H. "The Holy Communion, 1549," Church Quarterly Review, vol. 164, 1963, pp. 148–159
- Eamon Duffy, The Voices of Morebath: reformation and rebellion in an English village, New Haven, Conn.; London: Yale University Press, 2001. ISBN 0-300-09825-1
- Fletcher, Anthony, and Diarmaid MacCulloch, Tudor Rebellions, 5th ed., Harlow: Pearson Longman, 2004 (pp. 52–64). ISBN 0-582-77285-0
- Diarmaid MacCulloch, Thomas Cranmer: a life, New Haven, Conn.; London: Yale University Press, 1996 (pp. 429–432, 438–440). ISBN 0-300-07448-4
- Manning, Roger B. "Violence and social conflict in mid-Tudor rebellions," Journal of British Studies, vol. 16, 1977, pp. 18–40
- Mattingly, Joanna. "The Helston Shoemakers Guild and a possible connection with the 1549 rebellion," Cornish Studies, vol. 6, 1998, pp. 23–45
- Rose-Troup, Frances. The western rebellion of 1549: an account of the insurrections in Devonshire and Cornwall against religious innovations in the reign of Edward VI, London: Smith, Elder, 1913 online
- Mark Stoyle. "The dissidence of despair: rebellion and identity in early modern Cornwall," Journal of British Studies, vol. 38, 1999, pp. 423–444
- Mark Stoyle. "'Fullye Bente to Fighte Oute the Matter': Reconsidering Cornwall's Role in the Western Rebellion of 1549." English Historical Review 129.538 (2014): 549–577.
- Whittle, Jane. "Peasant Politics and Class Consciousness: The Norfolk Rebellions of 1381 and 1549 Compared." Past and Present 195.suppl_2 (2007): 233–247.
- Youings, Joyce. "The south-western rebellion of 1549," Southern History, vol. 1, 1979, pp. 99–122
- Mark Stoyle A Murderous Midsummer: The Western Rising of 1549, Yale University Press, 2022.
