= Cornish rebellion of 1497 =

Popular uprising in England

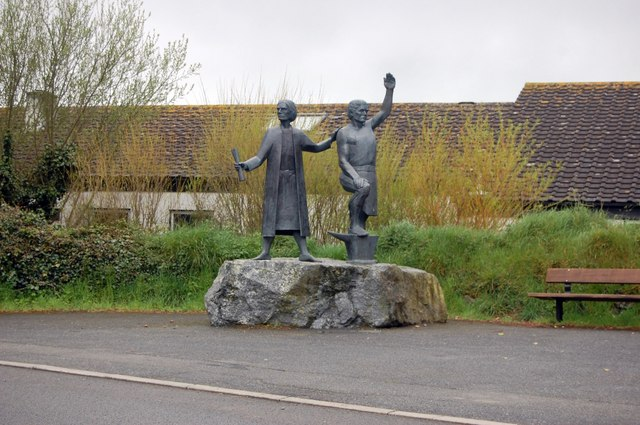
- Statue of Michael Joseph the Smith and Thomas Flamank in St Keverne Cornwall.
Date	May-17 June 1497
Location	Cornwall and other counties en route to London. Main battle at Deptford, London.
Result	Royal victory

Belligerents
Rebels from Cornwall and South-West England	Kingdom of England

Commanders and leaders
James, Lord Audley (executed); Thomas Flamank (executed); Michael An Gof (executed)	Henry VII; Giles, Lord Daubeny

Strength
At least 15,000	At least 25,000

The Cornish rebellion of 1497 (Cornish: Rebellyans Kernow), also known as the First Cornish rebellion, was a popular uprising in the Kingdom of England, which began in Cornwall and culminated with the Battle of Deptford Bridge near London on 17 June 1497.

The insurgent army mainly comprised Cornishmen, although it also gathered support from Devon, Somerset, and other English counties. The rebellion was a response to hardship caused by the raising of war taxes by King Henry VII to finance a campaign against Scotland. Cornwall suffered particularly because the king had recently stopped the legal operation of Cornish tin mining.

The rebellion's immediate outcome was military defeat, the execution of its main leaders, and death or other punishment for many of its participants. It may have led Perkin Warbeck, a pretender to the English throne, to choose Cornwall as his base later in the year for another attempt to overthrow Henry VII: an episode known as the Second Cornish uprising of 1497. Eleven years later, however, the king addressed the principal Cornish grievance by allowing tin production to resume legally, with a measure of autonomy.

== Background ==
A series of actions by King Henry VII in late 1496 and early 1497 increased the immediate hardships of many of his subjects, especially in Cornwall.

In 1496, after disagreements regarding new regulations for the tin-mining industry, the king, working partly through the Duchy of Cornwall, suspended the operation and privileges of the Cornish stannaries, a major part of the economy of the county. The privileges, which included exemption from certain royal and local taxes, had been granted by Edward I in 1305.

Being threatened in 1496 with invasion by James IV of Scotland and the pretender Perkin Warbeck, Henry VII levied an extraordinary series of financial demands on his subjects: a forced loan in late 1496, and in early 1497 a double portion of fifteenths and tenths taxation and a special subsidy levy. The burden fell more heavily on Cornwall than most areas, particularly in the collection of the forced loan.

== Rebellion ==
=== Beginnings in Cornwall ===
The first stirrings of protest arose in the parish of St Keverne on the Lizard peninsula, where there already was resentment against the actions of Sir John Oby, provost of Glasney College in Penryn, the tax collector for that area. In reaction to King Henry's tax levy, Michael Joseph (An Gof), a blacksmith from St. Keverne and Thomas Flamank, a lawyer of Bodmin, incited many of the people of Cornwall into armed revolt. Flamank formulated the aim of the rebellion as being to remove the two servants of the king seen as responsible for his taxation policies: Cardinal John Morton (the Lord Chancellor) and Sir Reginald Bray (the Chancellor of the Duchy of Lancaster). This emphasis created some room to argue that the uprising was not treasonous, but petitionary in nature. The rebels included at least two former MPs, Flamank (MP for Bodmin in 1492) and William Antron (MP for Helston in 1491–1492).

=== March to London ===
An army some 15,000 strong marched into Devon, attracting support in the form of provisions and recruits as they went. In Devon, however, support for the rebellion was far lower than in Cornwall, probably because the stannaries there had accepted new regulations in 1494, and had avoided the penalties inflicted on their Cornish counterparts.

Entering Somerset, the rebel army came to Taunton, where it is reported that they killed one of the commissioners of the subsidy, i.e. a collector of the offending tax. At Wells they were joined by James Touchet, the seventh Baron Audley, who had already been in correspondence with An Gof and Flamank. As a member of the nobility with military experience he was gladly received and acclaimed as their leader. The rebels then continued towards London, marching via Salisbury and Winchester.

=== Manoeuvres near London ===
King Henry had been preparing for war against Scotland. When he learned of the close approach of the West Country rebels to London, and of their strength, he diverted his main army of 8,000 men under Lord Daubeny to meet them, while a defensive force under Thomas Howard, 1st Earl of Surrey was sent to the Scottish border. Daubeny's army camped on Hounslow Heath on 13 June 1497. At the same time, there was general alarm among the citizens of London, many of whom mobilised to defend the city. The next day, a detachment of 500 of Daubeny's spearmen clashed with the rebels near Guildford.

Until then, the rebel army had met virtually no armed opposition, but neither had they gained significant numbers of new recruits since passing through Somerset. Now instead of approaching London directly they skirted to the south, since Flamank believed they would gain popular support from Kent, on the far side (south-eastern side) of London. Accordingly, after Guildford they moved via Banstead to Blackheath, an area of high ground south-east of the city, which they reached on 16 June. No Kentish uprising had materialised, however. On the contrary, forces of Kentish men had been mobilised against them under loyalist nobles, the Earl of Kent, Lord Abergavenny, and John Brooke, Lord Cobham.

Since the King had now mustered a large army in London, the outlook for the rebels was clearly grim, and there was much dismay and disunity among them that night in their camp on Blackheath. An Gof was adamant in preparing for battle. But many wanted to give themselves up: the original call to arms had not always been to commit the treason of direct warfare against the King, but to make him change his chief advisors and taxation policies. There were thousands of desertions from the insurgency that night.

== Battle of Deptford Bridge ==
=== Setting and deployments ===
The Battle of Deptford Bridge (also known as Battle of Blackheath) took place on 17 June 1497 on a site in present-day Deptford in south-east London, on the River Ravensbourne, and was the culminating event of the Cornish Rebellion. After leaving the West Country and approaching London, the insurgency had failed to attract enough new support or to move quickly enough to catch the king unprepared. The insurgents were now on the defensive. The king had mustered an army of some 25,000 men while the rebels, after late desertions, were down to 10,000 men or fewer. They also lacked the supporting cavalry and artillery arms essential to the professional forces of the time.

The king had spread word that he would attack the rebels on Monday 19 June, but in fact he did so early on the 17th. He regarded Saturday as his "lucky day". His forces were composed of three battalions, deployed so as to surround the high ground of Blackheath where the rebel army had camped and where its greater part was still positioned.

=== Fighting ===
The strongest of the king's battalions, under Lord Daubeny, attacked along the main road from London. This involved crossing Deptford Bridge (near the point where Ravensbourne River becomes Deptford Creek before joining the river Thames). The rebels were well enough prepared to have positioned guns and archers there, which inflicted severe casualties on the company of spearmen under Sir Humphrey Stanley tasked with securing the bridge. Stanley's company nevertheless succeeded in driving off the gunners and archers, killing some of them.

Lord Daubeny now led the attack up into the rebels' main position on the heath. So bold was his leadership that he became separated, surrounded by the enemy, and temporarily captured. The rebels could have killed him, but actually let him go unhurt. Overwhelmingly outnumbered, surrounded, poorly trained and equipped and lacking cavalry, their fight was now hopeless and their concern was probably to minimise the reprisals that would follow the battle.

The rebels were routed. Of their leaders, Thomas Flamank and Lord Audley were captured on the field of battle. Michael Joseph (An Gof) fled, apparently to seek sanctuary in the Friars' Church (near the former palace where the Greenwich Old Royal Naval College now stands), but was intercepted before he could enter. Between 200 and 2,000 of the rebels and eight of the royal army were killed in the battle, with the rest captured and, excluding the major leaders, nearly all pardoned by royal decree

=== Aftermath ===
After the battle, the King toured the battlefield, knighting the most valiant of his soldiers, and then returned over London Bridge into the city, where he similarly rewarded a few others, including the mayor, for their services in guarding London and feeding the army. Then he attended an impromptu service of thanksgiving at St Paul's Cathedral.

It was proclaimed that soldiers who had taken rebels prisoner could privately ransom them, and keep or sell their possessions.

== Outcomes of the rebellion ==
An Gof and Flamank were executed at Tyburn on 27 June 1497. An Gof is recorded to have said before his death (while tied to a hurdle being dragged towards the place of execution) that he should have "a name perpetual and a fame permanent and immortal". The two of them had been sentenced to be hanged, drawn and quartered. However the king accorded them the mercy of a quicker death, by hanging only, before their bodies were decapitated and quartered. The London Chronicler stated that their heads were set on London Bridge, the quarters of Flamank on four of the city gates, and the quarters of An Gof sent to be displayed at various points in Cornwall and Devon. Two other 16th-century sources (Hall and Polydore Vergil) report that although the king originally planned to have the quartered limbs exhibited in various parts of Cornwall, he was persuaded not to further antagonise the Cornish by doing this.

Audley, as a peer of the realm, was beheaded on 28 June at Tower Hill. His head, in common with those of An Gof and Flamank, was displayed on London Bridge.

In due course, severe monetary penalties, extracted by Crown agents, pauperised sections of Cornwall for years to come. Estates were seized and handed to more loyal subjects. After the phase of punishment, however, in 1508 the king acted to redress the Cornish grievances. He granted a pardon to the tinners for continuing to produce tin in contravention of the Duchy of Cornwall's regulations; the regulations themselves were rescinded; and the power of the Cornish Stannary Parliament to approve any regulations in the industry was reinstated.

== Memorials ==
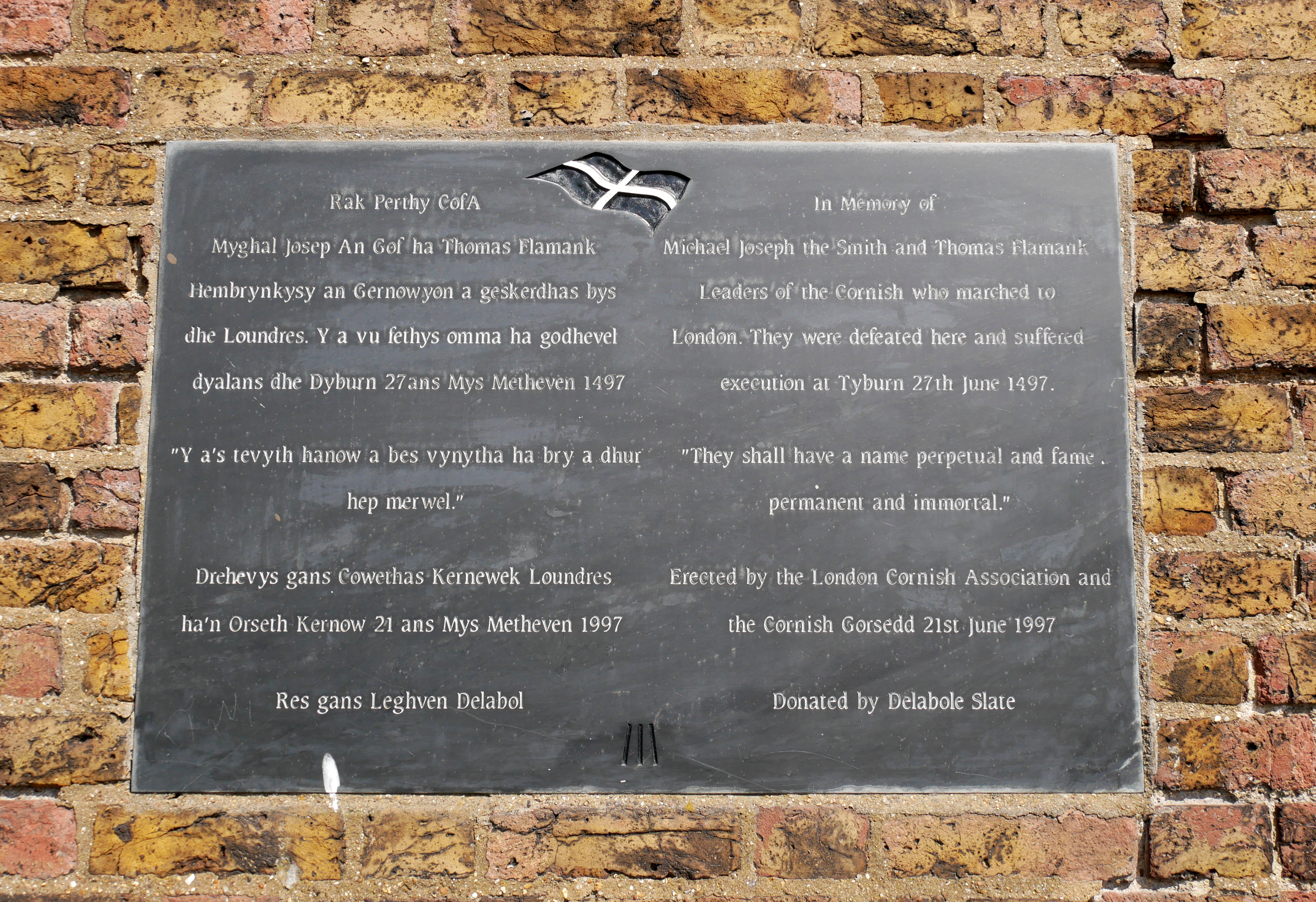
Commemorative plaque in Cornish and English for Michael Joseph the Smith (An Gof) and Thomas Flamank mounted on the north side of Blackheath, south east London, near the south entrance to Greenwich Park

In 1997, a commemorative march named Keskerdh Kernow (Cornish: "Cornwall marches on") retraced the original route of the Cornish from St. Keverne to Blackheath, London, to celebrate the quincentennial (500th anniversary) of the Cornish Rebellion. A statue depicting the Cornish leaders, "Michael An Gof" and Thomas Flamank, was unveiled at An Gof's village of St. Keverne. Commemorative plaques were also unveiled at Guildford (a stone memorial on Guild Down at the Mount) and on Blackheath.

In 2017 Peabody Trust/Family Mosaic unveiled a memorial sundial bench to commemorate the battle in Deptford. The memorial was designed and made by London mosaic artist Gary Drostle.

A stone monument commemorating the rebels Thomas Flamank and Michael Joseph is located in Fore Street in Bodmin.

== See also ==
- Second Cornish uprising of 1497
- List of topics related to Cornwall
- Prayer Book Rebellion
