= Sir William Davie, 4th Baronet =

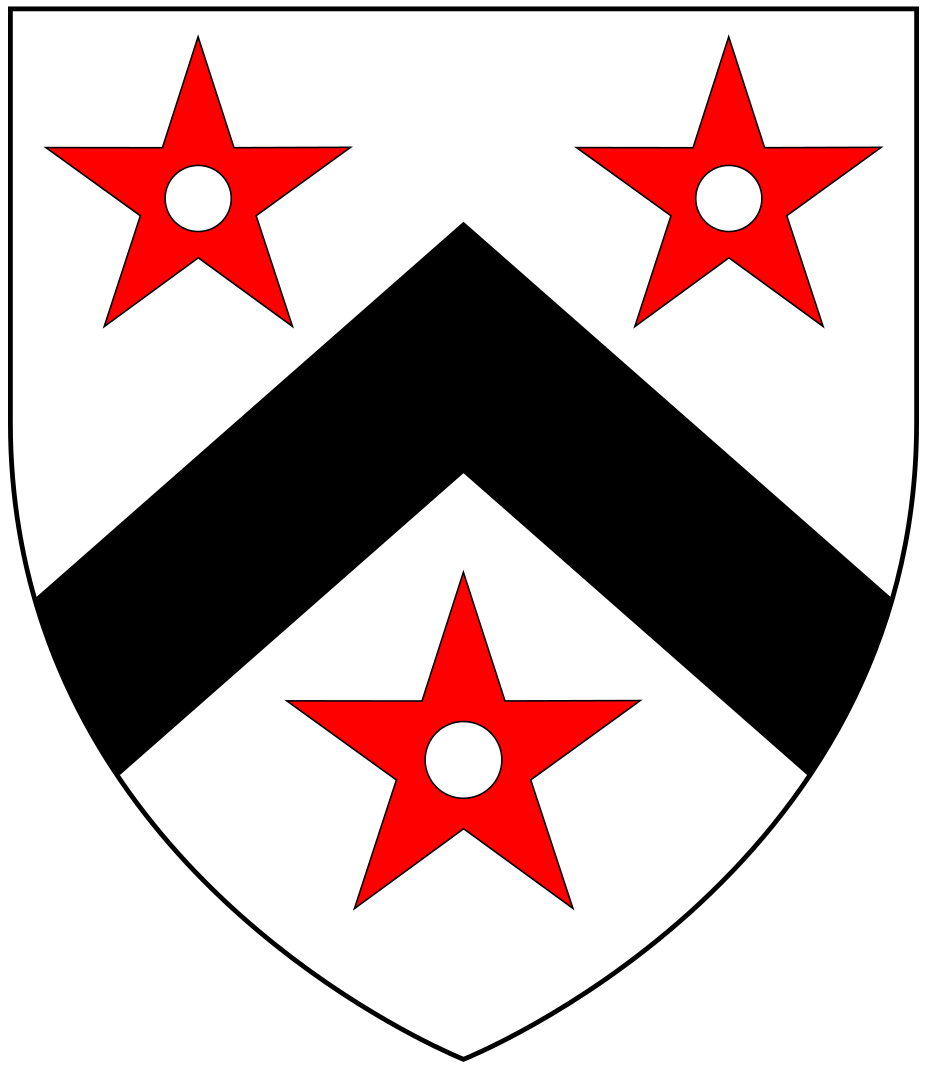
Arms of Davie: Argent, a chevron sable between three mullets pierced gules

Sir William Davie, 4th Baronet (1662–1707) of Creedy in the parish of Sandford, near Crediton in Devon, inherited the Davie baronetcy and the Davie estates from his elder brother Sir John Davie, 3rd Baronet (1660–1692), who had been MP for Saltash 1679–85 and Sheriff of Devon in 1688, who died unmarried at the age of 32.

== Origins ==
He was the younger son of William Davie (1614-1663) of Dar.(?), barrister-at-law (second son of Sir John Davie, 1st Baronet (c. 1589-1654) of Creedy) by his wife Margaret Clarke (d.1702), daughter of Sir Francis Clarke (1622/3-c.1690), a merchant of the City of London and member of the Levant Company.

== Marriages and children ==
He married twice, but left no male children, as follows:

- Firstly to Mary Steadman (d.1690/1), daughter and heiress of George Steadman of Downside, Midsomer Norton, Somerset, by whom he had one daughter:

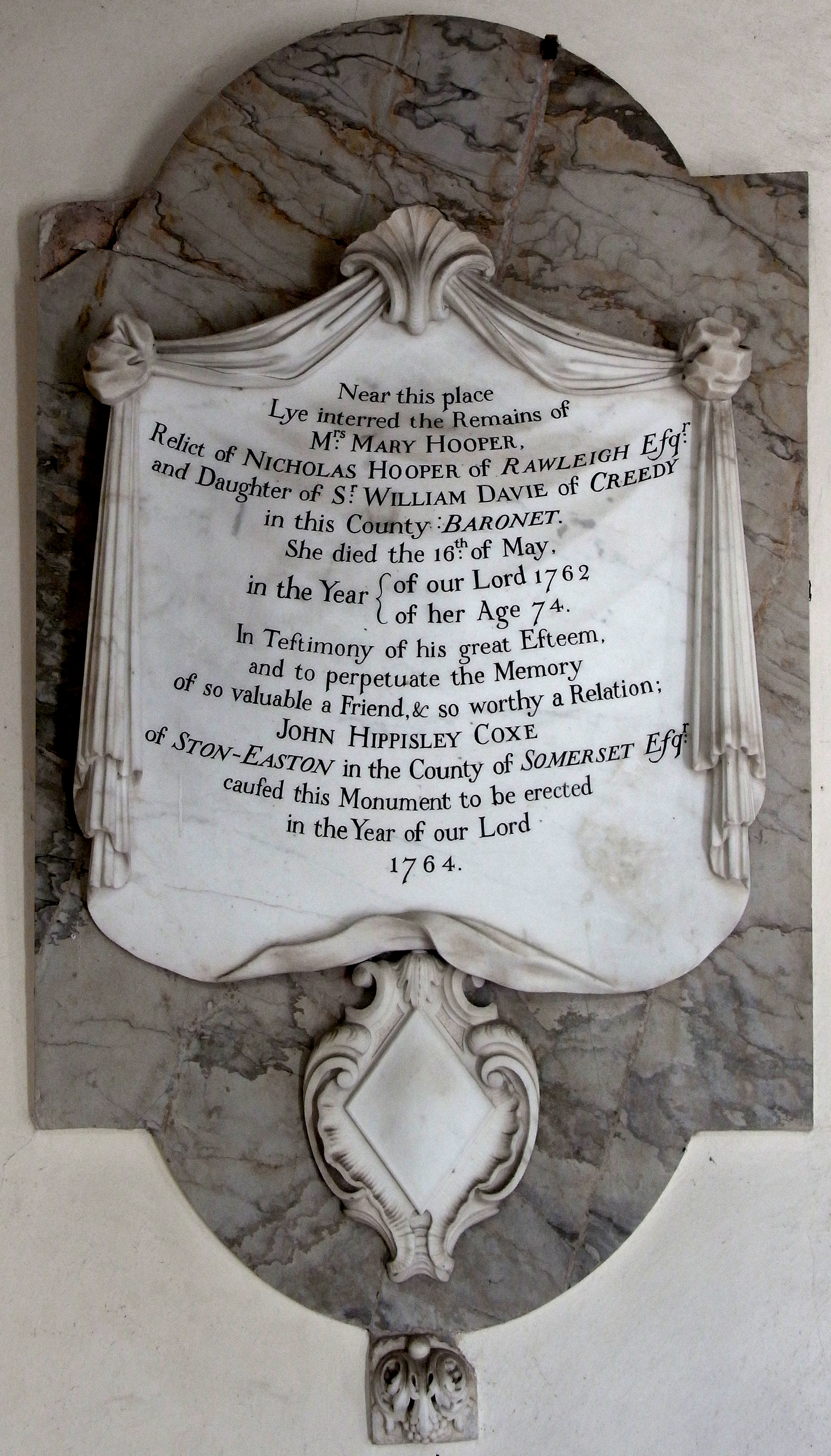
Mural monument in Sandford Church to Mary Davie (Mrs Hooper), eldest daughter of Sir William Davie, 4th Baronet

  - Mary Davie (1688-1762), who married Nicholas III Hooper (son of Sir Nicholas II Hooper (1654-1731) of Fullabrook, Braunton and Raleigh, Pilton in Devon, a lawyer who served as Tory Member of Parliament for Barnstaple 1695–1715), who rebuilt Raleigh House on an adjacent site slightly higher up the hill, which building survives today. Without children, Mary Davie (Mrs Hooper) was the heiress of her mother's estate at Downside, which she settled on John Hippisley-Coxe (1715-1769), the builder of Ston Easton House in Somerset, the husband of her half-niece Mary Northleigh (daughter and heiress of Stephen Northleigh (c.1692-?1731) of Peamore, Exminster, MP for Totnes (1713-1722), by his wife Margaret Davie, half-sister of Mary Davie (Mrs Hooper)). John Hippisley-Coxe erected the surviving mural monument to Mary Davie in Sandford Church, inscribed as follows:

"Near this place lye interred the remains of M^{rs.} Mary Hooper, relict of Nicholas Hooper of Rawleigh Esq^{r.} and daughter of S^{r.} William Davie of Creedy in this county, Baronet. She died the 16th of May in the year of our Lord 1762 (in the year) of her age 74. In testimony of his great esteem and to perpetuate the memory of so valuable a friend & so worthy a relation, John Hippisley Coxe of Ston-Easton in the county of Somerset Esq^{r.} caused this monument to be erected in the year of our Lord 1764"

- Secondly he married Abigail Pollexfen (d.1725), daughter of John Pollexfen, by whom he had a further four daughters:
  - Margaret Davie (born 1694), wife of Stephen Northleigh (c.1692-?1731) of Peamore, Exminster, MP for Totnes (1713-1722).
  - Frances Davie (1697-1748), wife of Sir George Chudleigh, 4th Baronet (d.1738), who built Haldon House near Exeter in Devon.
  - Elizabeth Davie (1700/1-1700/1), died an infant
  - Tryphena Davie (1699-1733)

== Death and succession ==
He died leaving no sons and was buried on 24 March 1707 at Sandford. His heir to the baronetcy and to the Davie estates was his first cousin Sir John Davie, 5th Baronet (died 1727), son of Humphry Davie (born 1625), a merchant in the City of London (a younger son of the 1st Baronet), by his wife Mary White.

Baronetage of England
Preceded by John Davie	Baronet (of Creedy); 1692–1707	Succeeded by John Davie
