= River Creedy =

River in Devon, England

Coordinates: 50°44′35″N 3°32′56″W

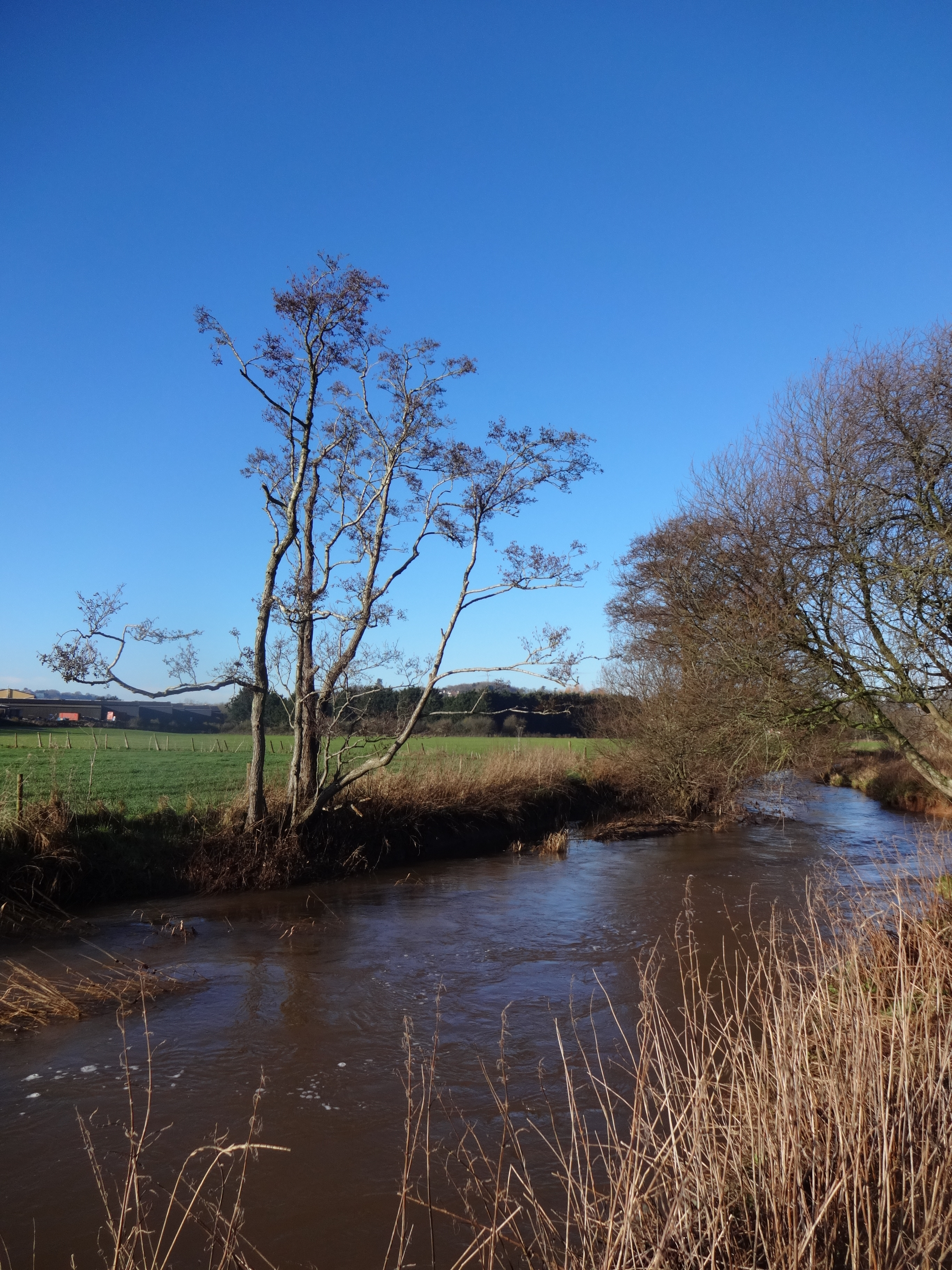
An alder tree on the banks of the River Creedy near Shobrooke Park

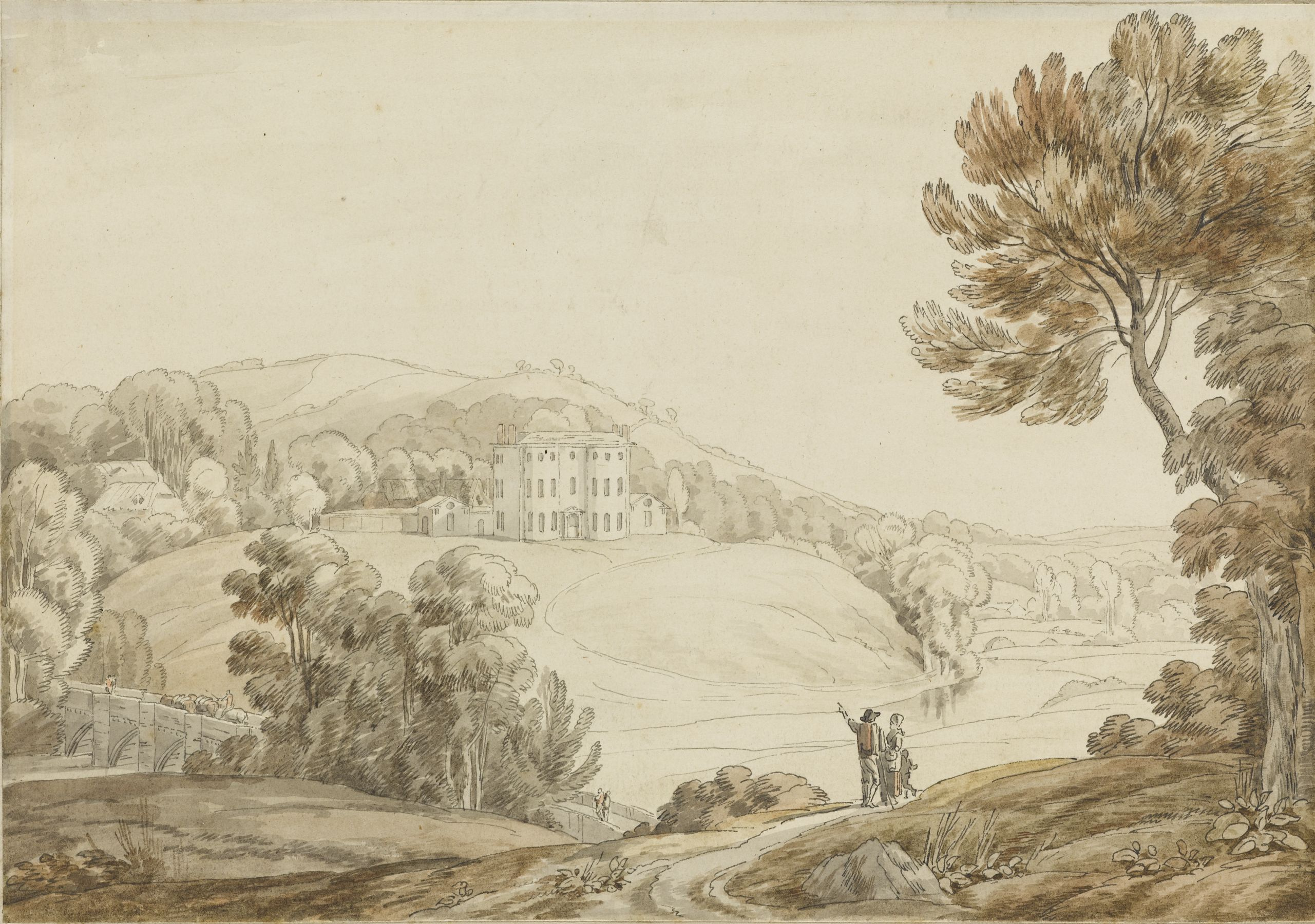
'Cowley Place, near Exeter' circa 1812. Pen and ink on paper by Francis Towne

The River Creedy is a small river in Devon, England. It gives its name to the local town or ton of Crediton, which is on its west bank, and to several local historic estates, such as Creedy Hilion, Creedy Peitevin (later called Creedy Wiger) and Creedy Park, in the parish of Sandford, also to the Benefice of North Creedy. Just below the town, the river merges with the River Yeo and it ends where it meets the River Exe at Cowley Bridge. The river is overlooked by Fordy Wood Copse, a 0.64 hectares (1.58 acres) woodland owned and managed by the Woodland Trust.

The name is believed to be of Celtic origin, but views on its precise origin differ. According to one source, it derives from a root meaning winding. Another view holds that it means shrinking, as compared with the more powerful Yeo.
