= Edward Stafford, 2nd Earl of Wiltshire =

Edward Stafford
- 2nd Earl of Wiltshire
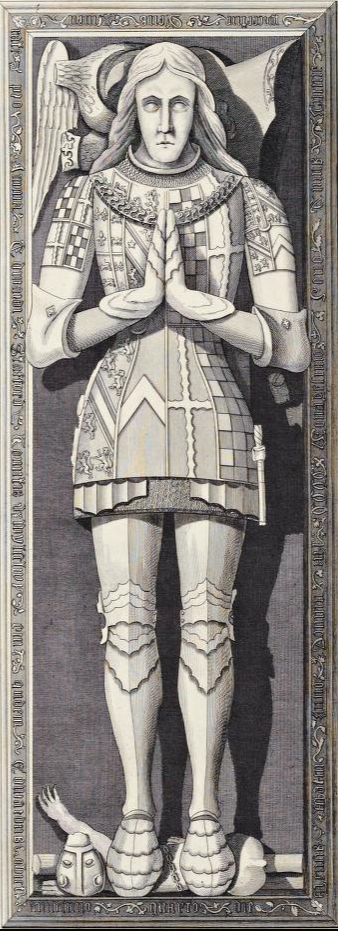
- Effigy of Edward Stafford, Lowick Church, 1796 drawing
- Born: 7 April 1470
- Died: 24 March 1499 (aged 28); Drayton, Northamptonshire
- Buried: Lowick, Northamptonshire
- Noble family: Stafford
- Spouse: Margaret Grey
- Father: John Stafford, 1st Earl of Wiltshire
- Mother: Constance Greene

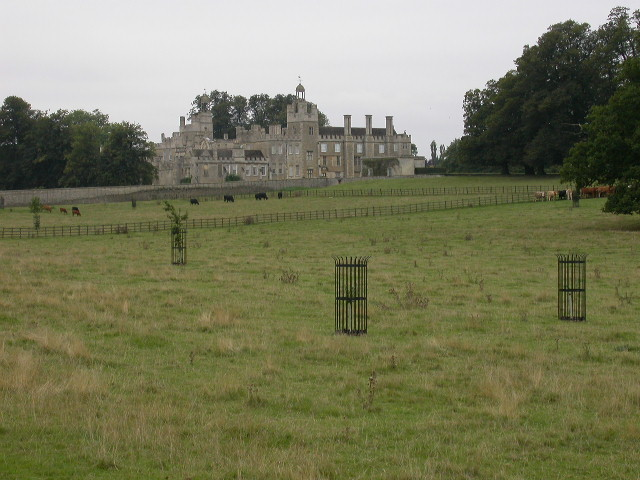
Drayton House, Lowick, Northamptonshire

Edward Stafford, 2nd Earl of Wiltshire KB (7 April 1470 – 24 March 1499) was an English nobleman.

== Origins ==
Edward Stafford, born 7 April 1470, was the only child of John Stafford, 1st Earl of Wiltshire (d. 8 May 1473), third son of Humphrey Stafford, 1st Duke of Buckingham, by Anne Neville (1414–1480), the daughter of Ralph Neville, 1st Earl of Westmorland, by his second marriage to Joan Beaufort, the legitimated daughter of John of Gaunt, 1st Duke of Lancaster, by his mistress and later third wife, Katherine Swynford.

Edward Stafford's mother was Constance Greene (d. 2 March 1475), the only daughter and heiress of Henry Greene, esquire, of Drayton in Lowick, Northamptonshire.

== Career ==
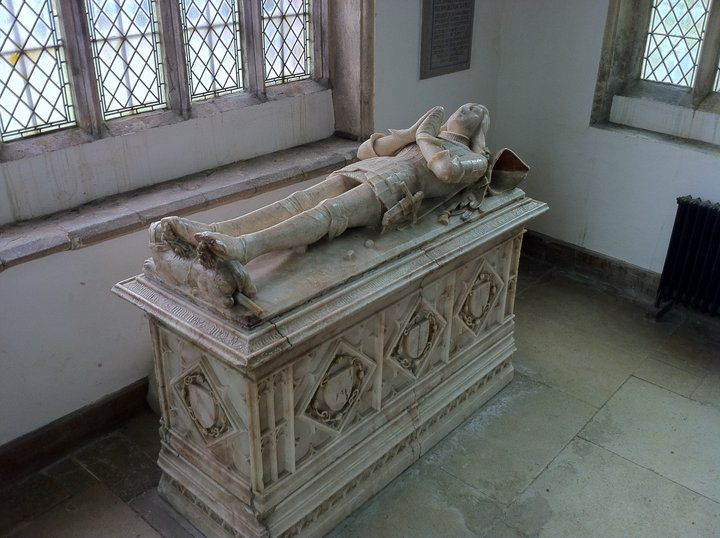
Tomb of Edward Stafford, Earl of Wiltshire, in St Peter's Church, Lowick

Stafford's father died 8 May 1473, and Stafford succeeded to the earldom at the age of three. He was made a Knight of the Bath on 18 April 1475, and on 16 March and 1 June of that year Sir Ralph Hastings was appointed steward of his lands during his minority, while his 'governance and tuition' were entrusted to his grandmother, Anne, Duchess of Buckingham.

On 6 July 1483 Stafford bore the Queen's crown at the coronation of King Richard III, and on 24 August of that year he was present at the creation of the King's, son, Edward, as Prince of Wales.

On 30 June 1484, at the age of fourteen, Stafford had licence to enter on his lands. On 25 November 1487 he attended the coronation of King Henry VII's Queen, Elizabeth of York. He was with the forces which fought against the Cornish rebels at Blackheath on 17 June 1497, and on 11 September 1498 entertained the King at Drayton.

Stafford died at Drayton on 24 March 1499 at the age of 28, and was buried at Lowick. His widow, Margaret, died between 8 August 1500 and 9 September 1504.

Stafford left a will dated 21 March 1499, summarized by Harris in Testamenta Vetusta, requesting burial in St. Peter's Church, Lowick:

My body to be buried in the Church of St. Peter of Lufwyke, in the County of Northampton, in Our Lady's aisle, by my grandfather Greene; and I will that my executors make a convenient tomb there for me.

== Marriage and issue ==
By settlement dated 13 July 1494 Stafford married Margaret Grey, the daughter of Edward Grey, Viscount Lisle, by Elizabeth Talbot, suo jure Baroness Lisle of Kingston Lisle. They had no issue, and the earldom of Wiltshire became extinct at Stafford's death.

The earldom of Wiltshire was re-created on 28 January 1510 for Edward Stafford's cousin, Henry Stafford, 1st Earl of Wiltshire. Burke erroneously states that Edward Stafford's widow, Margaret, married Henry Stafford. However Cokayne, Vol. XII, p. 738, states that this alleged marriage did not take place. Moreover, Burke mistakenly identifies Stafford's widow, Margaret, as the daughter of John Grey, Viscount Lisle, whereas she was the daughter of Edward Grey, Viscount Lisle, and his wife, Elizabeth Talbot (d. 8 September 1487), and the sister of John Grey (d. 6 or 9 September 1504), 2nd Viscount Lisle.

== Notes ==
Peerage of England
Preceded by John Stafford, 1st Earl of Wiltshire	Earl of Wiltshire; 1473–1498/1499	Extinct
