= Sir John Davie, 2nd Baronet =

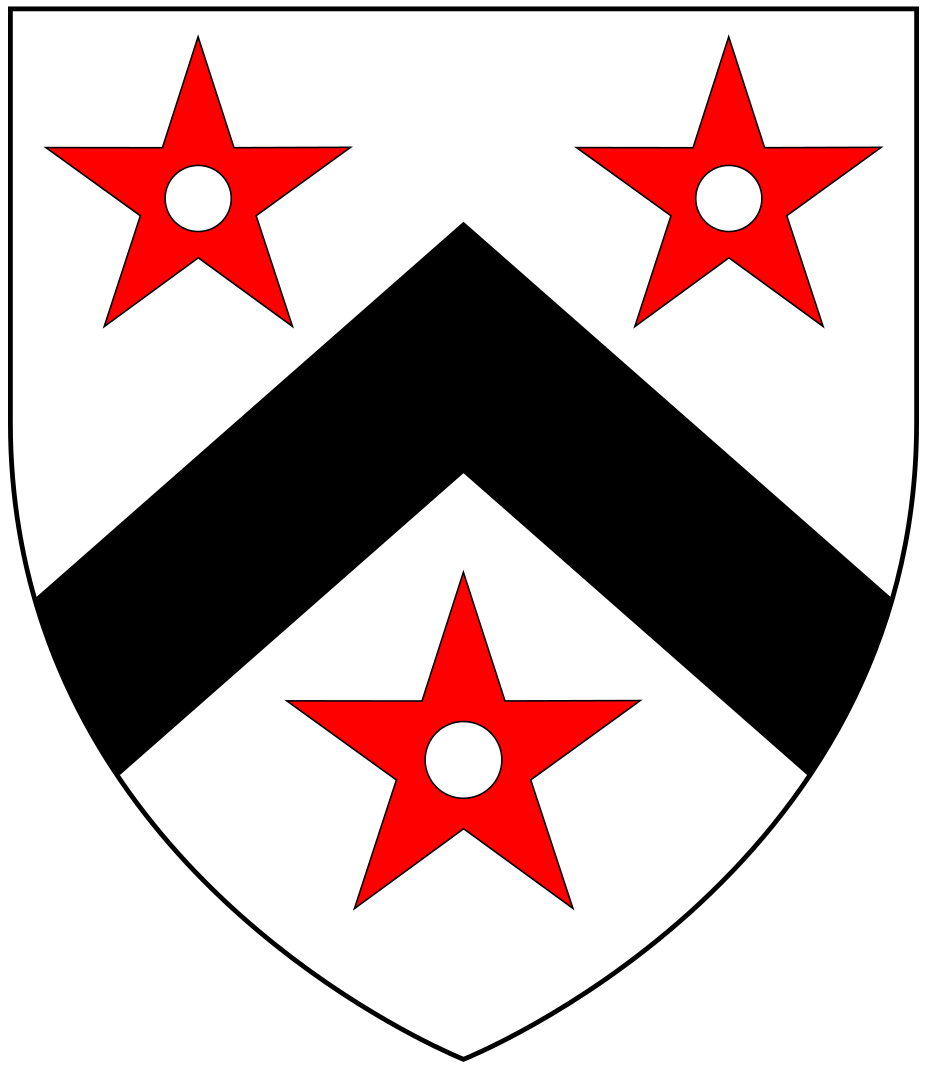
Arms of Davie of Creedy in the parish of Sandford, Devon: Argent, a chevron sable between three mullets pierced gules

Sir John Davie, 2nd Baronet (1612–1678) of Creedy in the parish of Sandford, Devon, was Member of Parliament for Tavistock, Devon, in 1661 and was Sheriff of Devon from 1670 to 1671.

== Origins ==
He was baptised on 6 December 1612, at Sandford. He was the son and heir of Sir John Davie, 1st Baronet (c. 1589 – 1654) of Creedy, by his first wife (and second cousin) Juliana Strode (died 1627), 5th daughter of Sir William Strode (1562–1637), MP, of Newnham, Plympton St Mary, Devon, by his first wife Mary Southcott (died 1617), daughter of Thomas Southcott (died 1600), of Indio, Bovey Tracey. She was a sister of William Strode (1594–1645), MP, one of the Five Members whose attempted arrest in the House of Commons by King Charles I in 1642 sparked the Civil War. She is shown as one of his seven daughters sculpted in relief on the mural monument of Sir William Strode in Plympton St Mary Church.

== Career ==
He matriculated at Exeter College, Oxford on 2 December 1631 aged 19. He succeeded his father in the baronetcy in October 1654, and in 1661 he was elected Member of Parliament for Tavistock, Devon, in the Cavalier Parliament but only sat for six months. He was Sheriff of Devon from 1670 to 1671.

== Marriages and children ==
Davie married four times as follows, but left no surviving male children:

- Firstly to Eleanor Acland, daughter of Sir John Acland, 1st Baronet (c. 1591 – 1647), of Columb John, Devon, by his wife Elizabeth Vincent, daughter of Sir Francis Vincent, 1st Baronet. Without children.
- Secondly, in or before 1645, to Triphena Reynell (died 1659), daughter of Richard Reynell, MP, of Lower Creedy, Devon, and widow of Nicholas Hunt of Chudleigh, by whom he had one son and one daughter:
  - John Davie (died 1668), who predeceased his father and died unmarried.
  - Tryphena Davie (died 1668)
- Thirdly, in 1661, to Margaret Glanville (1628–1670), daughter of Sir Francis Glanville, MP, of Kilworthy, near Tavistock, and widow of William Kelly of Kelly, without children.
- Fourthly to Amy Parker, daughter of Edmund Parker (1613–1691), of Boringdon Hall, Plympton St Mary, Devon, ancestor of the Earls of Morley of Saltram House, and widow of Walter Hele of South Poole. Without children. She made a third marriage to Sir Nicholas Slanning, 1st Baronet.

== Death and burial ==
Davie died at the age of about 67 and was buried at Sandford on 31 July 1678.

== Succession ==
He had no surviving male children and was succeeded by his nephew, John Davie, 3rd Baronet (1660–1692), the eldest son of his younger brother William Davie (1614–1663), a Barrister-at-Law.

== Sources ==
- Crossette, J.S., biography of Davie, Sir John, 2nd Bt. (1612-78), of Creedy, Devon, published in The History of Parliament: the House of Commons 1660-1690, ed. B.D. Henning, 1983

Parliament of England
Preceded by William Russell; George Howard	Member of Parliament for Tavistock; 1661; With: George Howard	Succeeded by Lord Russell; George Howard
Baronetage of England
Preceded by John Davie	Baronet (of Creedy); 1654–1678	Succeeded by John Davie
