= George Southcote (died 1589) =

English politician

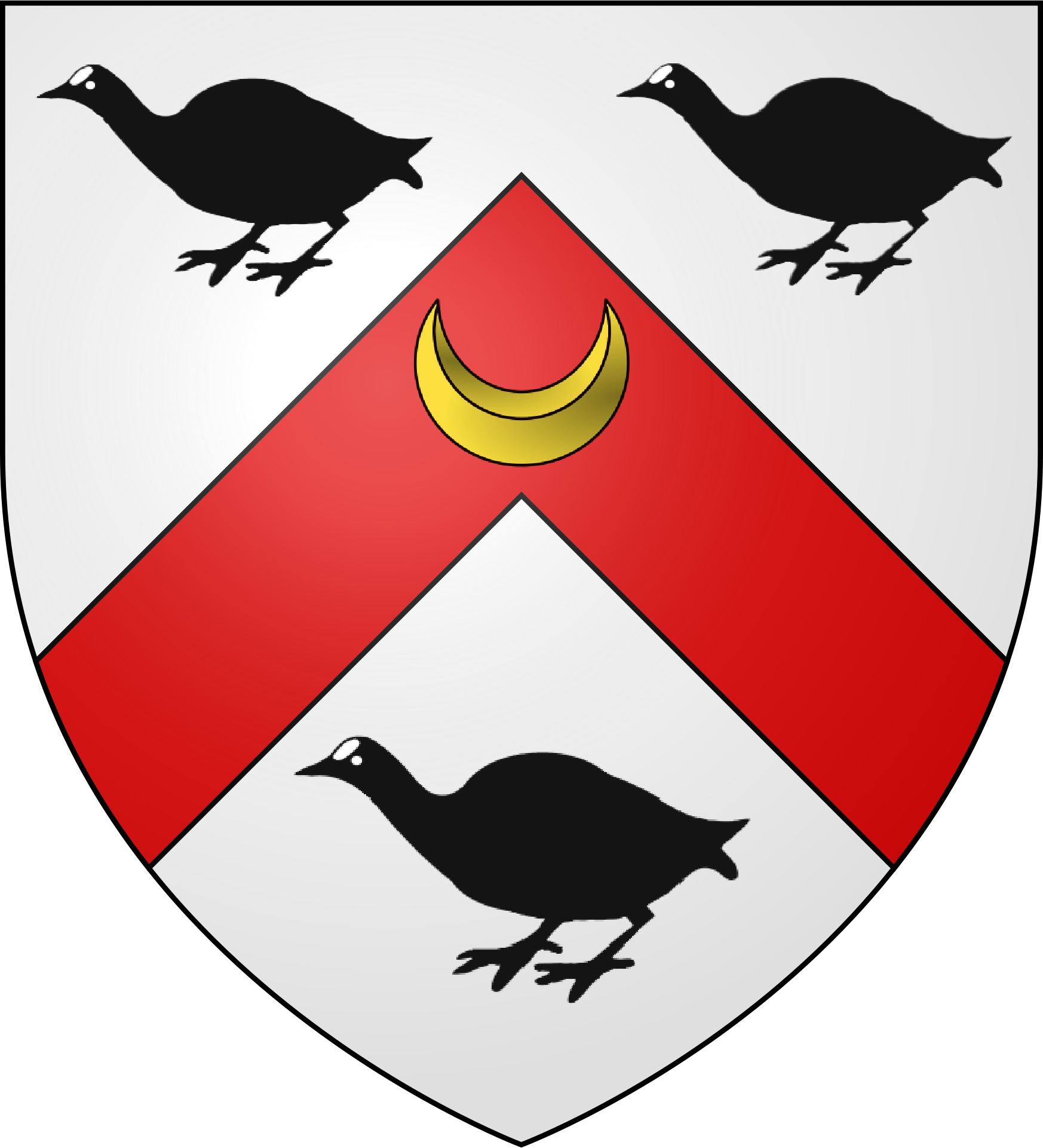
Arms of the Southcote family of Calverleigh. Argent, a chevron gules, between three coots sable, a cressent or for difference.

George Southcote MP of Calverleigh (1533–1589) was an English politician.

He was a Member (MP) of the Parliament of England for Lostwithiel in April 1554 and Tavistock in 1558; it is strongly believed that he was made a member of parliament for Tavistock due to his brother's great friendship and association with the 2nd Earl of Bedford, the lord of the borough.

His daughter, Margaret Southcott, married John Davie (1541/2-1611/2) of Exeter, Crediton and Creedy. George had two grandchildren by the marriage a son and heir Sir John Davie, 1st Baronet (died 1654) and a daughter Margaret Davie, wife of Gideon Haydon of Cadhay, Epford and Woodbury.
