= Arthur Champernowne (died 1717) =

Arthur Champernowne (1683? – 1717), of Dartington, Devon, was an English politician who sat in the House of Commons from 1715 to 1717.

Champernowne was the second son of Arthur Champernowne of Dartington and his second wife Margaret Fowell, a daughter of Sir John Fowell, 2nd Baronet of Fowelscombe in the parish of Ugborough in Devon.

In 1696, he succeeded to the family estate on the death of his elder brother. He matriculated at Exeter College, Oxford on 2 March 1702, aged 18. He married as his first wife Elizabeth Courtenay daughter of Francis Courtenay of Powderham, Devon.

Champernowne was returned unopposed as Member (MP) for Totnes at the 1715 general election but died two years later.

Champernowne' wife died in 1717 and he died on 27 April 1717 after marrying as his second wife Susannah the twice widowed daughter of John Kelland a previous MP for Totnes. He left two sons and a daughter by his first wife.

Parliament of Great Britain
Preceded by Stephen Northleigh; Francis Gwyn	Member of Parliament for Totnes; 1715 – 1717; With: Stephen Northleigh	Succeeded by Stephen Northleigh; Sir John Germain, Bt
