= Newbuildings, Devon =

Coordinates: 50.818654°N 3.7116934°W

Newbuildings
- Hamlet
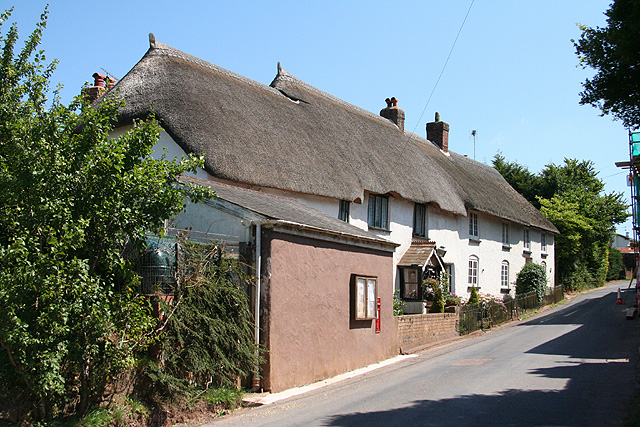
- Thatched cottages in Newbuildings – Staddlestones and Shoplands (shown) are Grade II listed buildings.

- Location within Devon
- OS grid reference: SS7952003520
- Civil parish: Sandford
- District: Mid Devon
- Shire county: Devon
- Region: South West
- Country: England
- Sovereign state: United Kingdom
- Post town: CREDITON
- Postcode district: EX17
- Dialling code: 01363
- Police: Devon and Cornwall
- Fire: Devon and Somerset
- Ambulance: South Western
- UK Parliament: Central Devon

Newbuildings (less frequently New Buildings) is a hamlet in the civil parish of Sandford, in the Mid Devon district of Devon, England. It is located approximately 3 miles (4.8 km) northwest of Crediton.

There is a local church, Beacon Church, providing regular services. Newbuildings is served by the Dartline 369 bus route between Morchard Bishop and Exeter. A postbox in the hamlet is collected daily by Royal Mail. A BT telephone box was repurposed to contain an emergency defibrillator in 2021, with funding from a local charity.

== History ==
Newbuildings, occasionally referred to as New Buildings and less commonly New-Buildings, has been settled since at least 1650. Newbuildings was a frequent stopping place for coach travellers – an inn, the Hare and Hounds, was purpose-built to accommodate travellers and provide a resting place for horses; the inn is now a private cottage. Local historian Daphne Munday, in her work A Parish Patchwork, speculates this could be the origin of the hamlet's name. Newbuildings is mentioned in John Ogilby's 1675 coaching map as being on the route from Exeter to Barnstaple. The Bishop of Derry, Ezekiel Hopkins, was born in nearby Sandford in 1633, later transferring to Derry, Ireland. The hamlet shares the name of Newbuildings, a County Londonderry village; it is unknown whether either settlement's name was influenced by Hopkins or the naming is coincidental.

A school was set up in the room of a local house in 1743, and was in use until 1874 when work began to establish a national school. The subsequent school was completed around 1876, and the construction, alongside a school in the nearby East Village hamlet, cost £500. The school had only a single room, with teachers facing difficulties as a result, and functioned as a place of worship on Sundays.

A blacksmith and wheelwright were established in buildings built alongside the Hare and Hounds inn. By 1800, an unofficial local census recorded 351 dwellings in the Sandford parish, which included Newbuildings and the nearby East Village hamlet. The Hare and Hounds was still recorded as being a public house in the year 1825, and a machinist, blacksmith, wheelwright, and schoolmistress are recorded as living in Newbuildings in 1878. It is unknown exactly how long after 1825 that the Hare and Hounds ceased to function as a pub, becoming the private cottage it is today.

The school later became Beacon Church, part of the combined "Parish of Sandford with Upton Hellions", and continues to provide regular services to residents of Newbuildings and nearby areas. In 2024, locals marked the 80-year anniversary of D-Day at Beacon Church.
