= Fordy Wood Copse =

Woodland in Devon, England

- Location within Devon
- Interactive map of Fordy Wood Copse

Geography
- Location: Devon, England
- OS grid: SS818057
- Coordinates: 50.839°N 3.679°W
- Area: 0.64 hectares (1.58 acres)

Administration
- Authority: Woodland Trust

Fordy Wood Copse is a woodland in Devon, England, near Sandford. It covers a total area of 0.64 hectares (1.58 acres) and overlooks the River Creedy. It is owned and managed by the Woodland Trust. There is no public access to the site.
