= Lowick, Northamptonshire =

Village in Northamptonshire, England

Coordinates: 52.413°N 0.567°W

Lowick
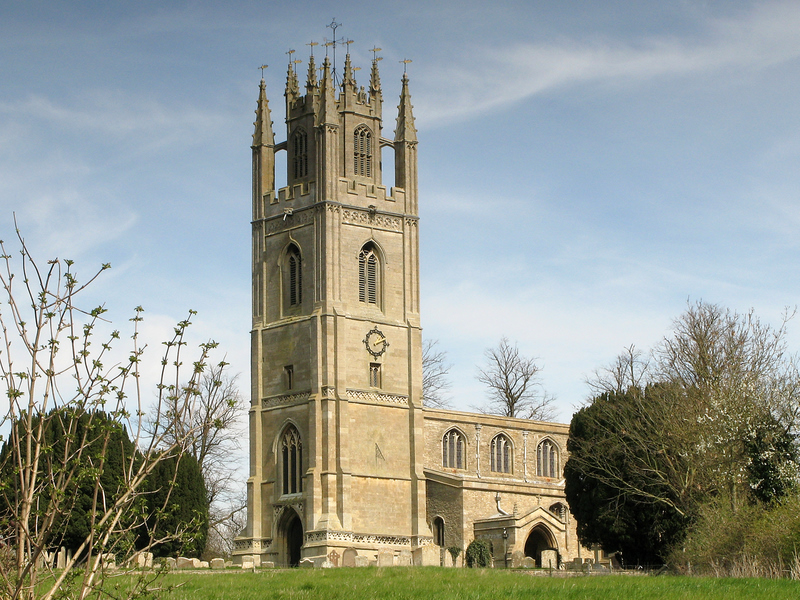
- St Peter's Church, Lowick

- Location within Northamptonshire
- Population: 298 (2011 census)
- OS grid reference: SP9780
- Unitary authority: North Northamptonshire
- Ceremonial county: Northamptonshire
- Region: East Midlands
- Country: England
- Sovereign state: United Kingdom
- Post town: Kettering
- Postcode district: NN14
- Dialling code: 01832
- Police: Northamptonshire
- Fire: Northamptonshire
- Ambulance: East Midlands

Lowick is a village and civil parish forming part of the district of North Northamptonshire, England, about 2 miles (3.2 km) north-west of Thrapston. It appears in the Domesday Book of 1086 as Luhwik, and later as Lofwyk and in 1167 as Luffewich. The name derives from Old English "Luhha's or Luffa's dwelling place", wic being cognate to vicus in Latin. At the time of the 2011 census, the parish's population was 298 people.

The village should not be confused with Lowick, Northumberland.

== Buildings ==
Drayton House is 1 mile (1.6 km) south-west of the village.

St Peter's Church was built by the Greene family of Drayton between the late fourteenth and early fifteenth centuries. The former school building in Drayton Road was built by Sir John Germaine and his wife and dates from 1717 to 1725.

The George Eliot book Middlemarch was written, at least in part, in the village's old rectory, which is mentioned in the book itself.

== Iron ore quarrying and mining ==
Iron ore was obtained in three places close to the village. All of the ore was taken to the Islip Ironworks site. Most of the ore was used at that works until it closed in 1942. The rest of the ore was loaded into railway wagons at Islip and taken elsewhere for smelting. After 1942 it was taken to Corby Works.

Quarrying began to the south of the village in 1901 and continued on and off until 1948. A mine adit was started in the quarry face in 1923. This mine connected with another underground in 1933 and from then the two mines were worked as one with an entrance closer to the Islip Ironworks.

There was another quarry to the north west of the village. Quarrying began there in 1902 and extended into Sudborough parish later. The Lowick part of the quarry was worked out by 1939. Work in the Sudborough part continued until 1952. There was a smaller quarry to the west of Lowick which was worked during 1908

Ore from all of these quarries was taken to Islip by three-foot gauge tramway worked by steam locomotives. Quarrying was done by hand with the aid of explosives at first. Steam quarrying machines were introduced from 1915 and diesel machines from 1932. In the mine there was a 2-foot 6-inch gauge tramway that used horse haulage but diesel locomotives were used for some of this work from 1932.

There was also a limestone quarry south east of the village (east of the Islip road) which was worked between 1918 and 1931. This was served by a branch of the 3-foot gauge tramway.

Traces of the quarries and tramway remain although much has been landscaped. As of 1985 part of the mine roof had collapsed and it was possible to walk into the mine tunnel.
