= River Yeo (tributary of the Creedy) =

River in Devon, England

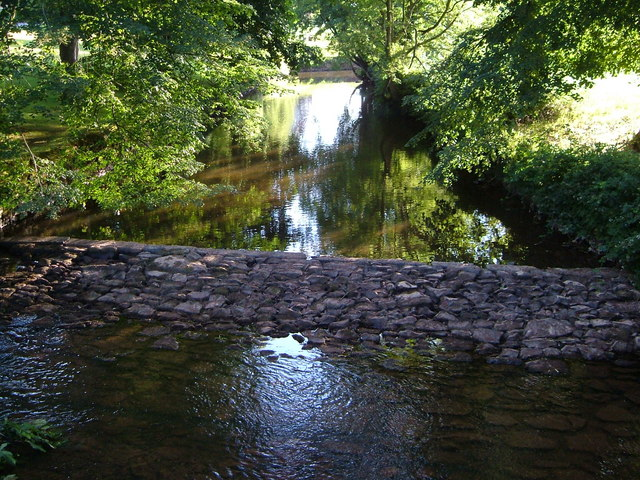
- The River Yeo at Fordton

- Location within Devon Location within the United Kingdom

Location
- Country: England
- County: Devon

Physical characteristics
- Source
  - location: Whiddon Down
  - coordinates: 50°43′18.25″N 3°50′20.07″W
- Mouth: River Creedy
  - location: Crediton
  - coordinates: 50°46′53.7″N 3°36′49.6″W

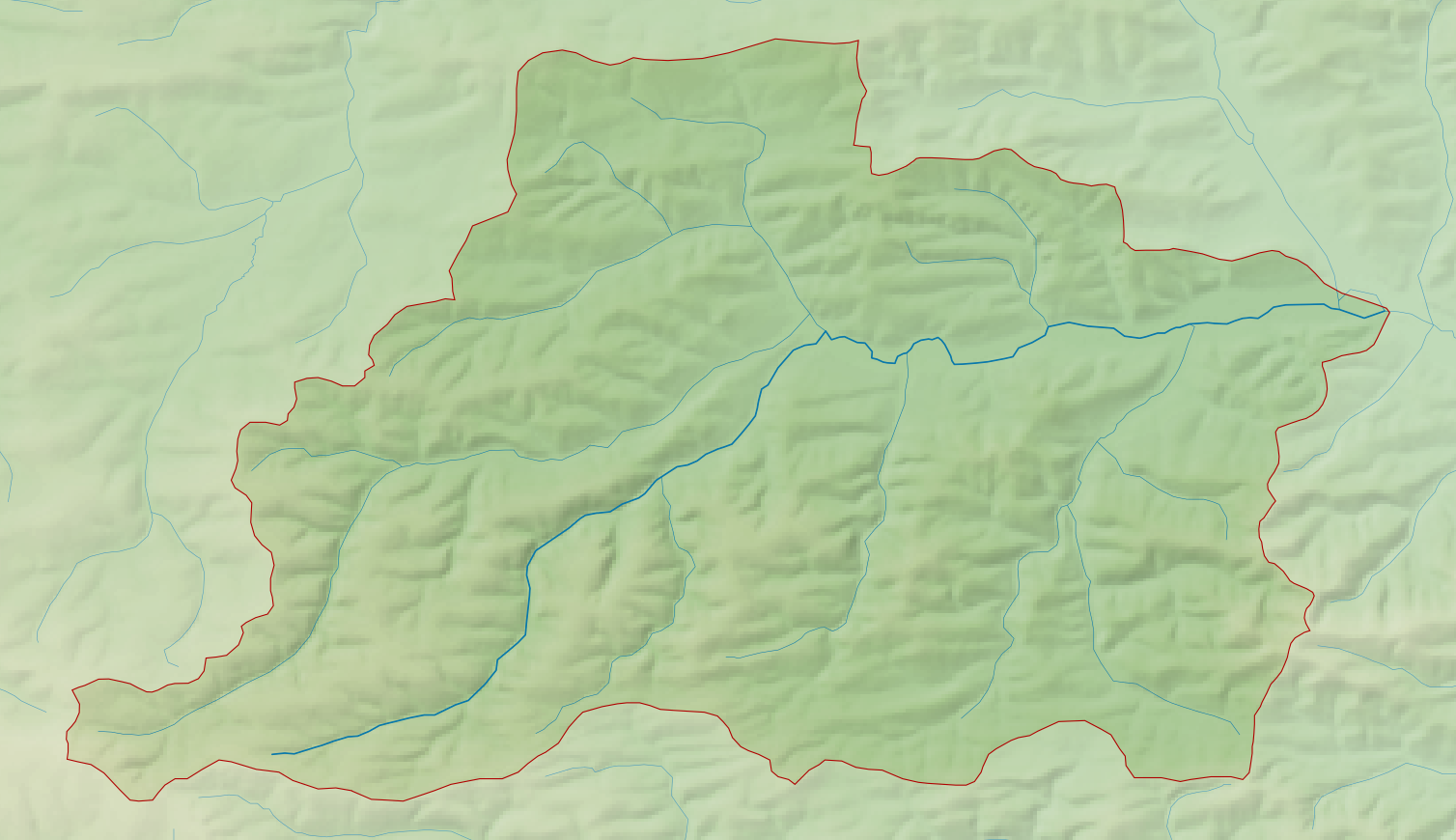
A map of the River Yeo

The River Yeo is a tributary to the River Creedy. It is located in Devon, England, and its headwaters float within two miles of a different River Yeo, which is a tributary to River Taw.

It is a popular location for fly fishing, with the Crediton Fly Fishing Club owning a small portion of it.

== Overview ==
Tributaries of the River Yeo include River Culvery which joins just south of Crediton, Ford Brook which joins at Neopardy, and River Troney which joins at Yeoford. The source of the river is near Merrymeet Junction on the A30 Road at Whiddon Down.

Since January 1997, a flood gauge at Yeoford measures the river height, which is normally below 0.66 metres (2 ft 2 in). The site base level is 60.58 metres (198.8 ft) The highest recorded level is 2.69 metres (8 ft 10 in) on 25 November 2012.

South of Crediton the River Yeo forms part of the boundary between Crediton Civil Parish and Crediton Hamlets Civil Parish. Southwest of Yeoford the River Yeo forms the boundary between Colebrook Civil Parish and Crediton Hamlets Civil Parish. Further to the southwest it forms the boundary between Hittisleigh CP and Cheriton Bishop CP.

Places along the river include Downs Crediton Golf Club, Fordton Mill, Salmonhutch, Salmonhutch Caravan Park, Beare Mill, Neopardy, Yeoford, Martin's Moor Copse, Wotton's Moor Copse, Binneford, Binneford Wood, Parlepit Copse, Furzeyew Copse, Vennals Copse, Milball Copse, Ball Copse, and Treable Woods.
