= Sir John Davie, 1st Baronet =

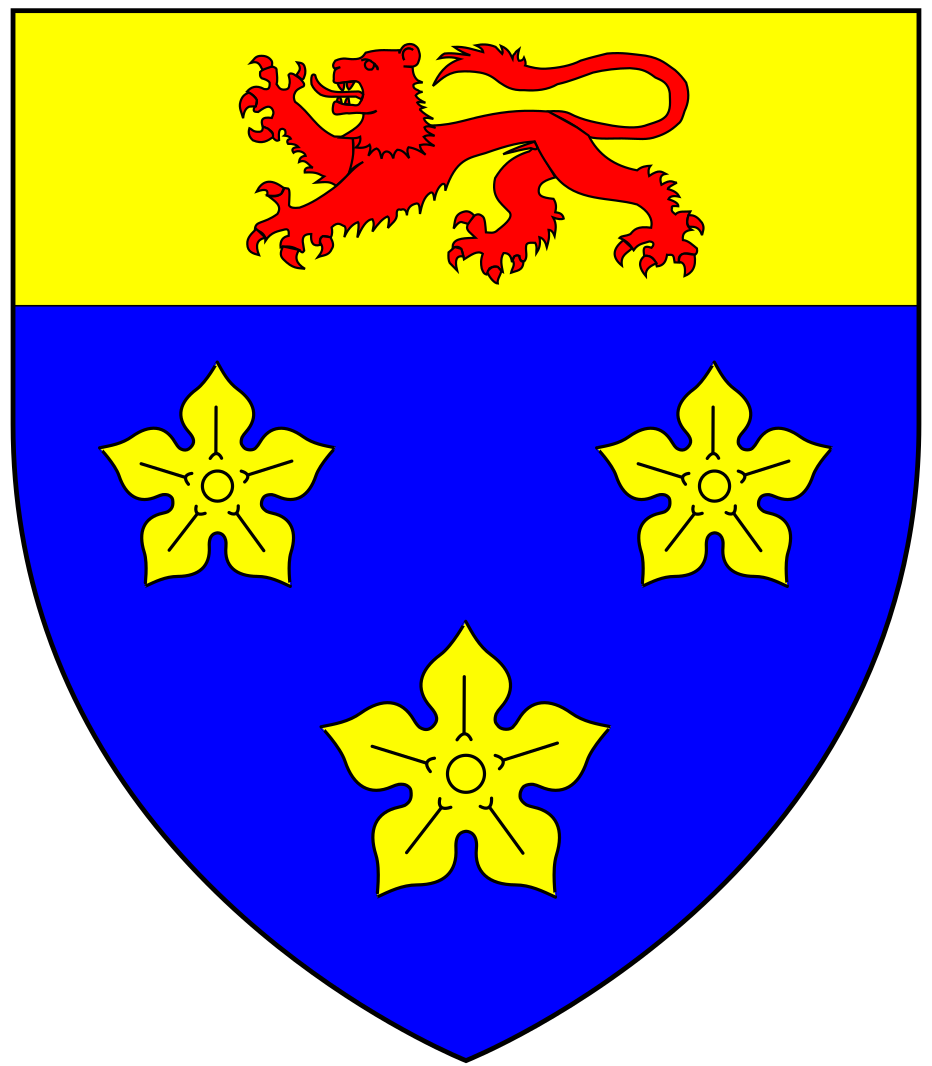
Arms of Sir John Davie

Sir John Davie, 1st Baronet (1588–1654) of Creedy in the parish of Sandford, near Crediton, Devon, was a member of the Devonshire gentry and served as Member of Parliament for Tiverton in 1621-2 and as Sheriff of Devon (1629–1630). He was created a baronet in 1641.

Davie was the son and heir of John Davie of Sandford and Crediton, Devon by his wife Margaret Southcote, daughter of George Southcote, of Calverley, Devon.

He matriculated at Exeter College, Oxford on 22 February 1605, aged 16. In 1621 he was elected Member of Parliament for the newly enfranchised constituency of Tiverton in Devon. He served as Sheriff of Devon from 1629 to 1630 and was created a baronet on 9 September 1641.

Davie married twice. His first wife was Juliana Strode (died 1627), fifth daughter of Sir William Strode (1562–1637), MP. She was a sister of William Strode (1594–1645), MP, one of the Five Members whose attempted arrest in the House of Commons by King Charles I in 1642 sparked the Civil War. She died on 14 May 1627 and was buried at Sandford on 25 May 1627 where there is a mural monument to her in the church. By Juliana he had children including:

- Sir John Davie, 2nd Baronet (1612–1678), eldest son and heir, MP for Tiverton.
- William Davie (1614–1663) of Dar.(?), 2nd son, barrister-at-law, who married Margaret Clarke (died 1702), daughter of Sir Francis Clarke (1622/3-c.1690), a merchant of the City of London and member of the Levant Company, by whom he had children including:
  - Sir John Davie, 3rd Baronet (1660–1692), eldest son, MP for Saltash 1679–85, Sheriff of Devon in 1688, died unmarried.
  - Sir William Davie, 4th Baronet (1662–1707), second son and heir to his brother.

Davie's second marriage was to Isabel Hele (died 1656) of Gnaton, Devon, by whom he had a daughter:

- Isabell Davie (1631–1673), who in 1649 married Sir Walter Yonge, 2nd Baronet (c. 1625 – 1670), MP, of Colyton, Devon.

Davie died in 1654 at the age of about 66 and was buried at Sandford on 13 October 1654.

== Sources ==
- Yerby, George & Hunneyball, Paul, biography of Davie, John (1589-1654), of Creedy House, Sandford, Devon, published in The History of Parliament: the House of Commons 1604–1629, ed. Andrew Thrush and John P. Ferris, 2010

Parliament of England
New constituency	Member of Parliament for Tiverton; 1621=1622; With: John Bampfield	Succeeded by Sir George Chudleigh; Humphrey Weare
Baronetage of England
New creation	Baronet (of Creedy); 1641–1654	Succeeded by Sir John Davie
