= St Peter's Church, Lowick =

St. Peter's Church, Lowick
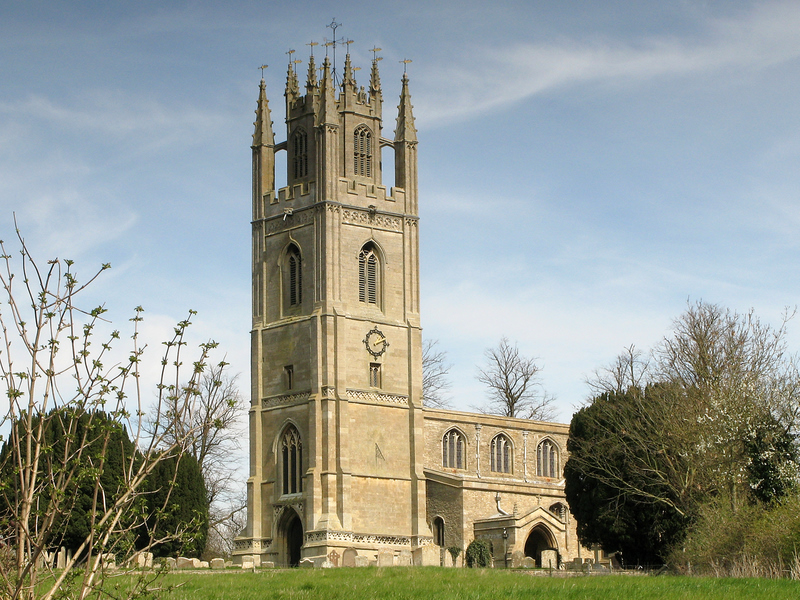
- St. Peter's Church, Lowick, Northamptonshire
- St. Peter's Church, Lowick
- 52.41163°N 0.55706°W
- OS grid reference: SP 97763 81006
- Country: England
- Denomination: Church of England
- Churchmanship: Broad Church

History
- Dedication: Saint Peter

Architecture
- Heritage designation: Grade I listed building
- Style: Perpendicular Gothic
- Groundbreaking: circa 1300
- Completed: 1460

Specifications
- Length: 83 feet (25 m)
- Width: 40 feet 5 inches (12.3 m)
- Height: 96 ft (29 m)

Administration
- Province: Canterbury
- Diocese: Peterborough
- Parish: Lowick, Northamptonshire

St. Peter's Church, Lowick, is the Church of England parish church of Lowick, Northamptonshire, England.

== Description and history ==
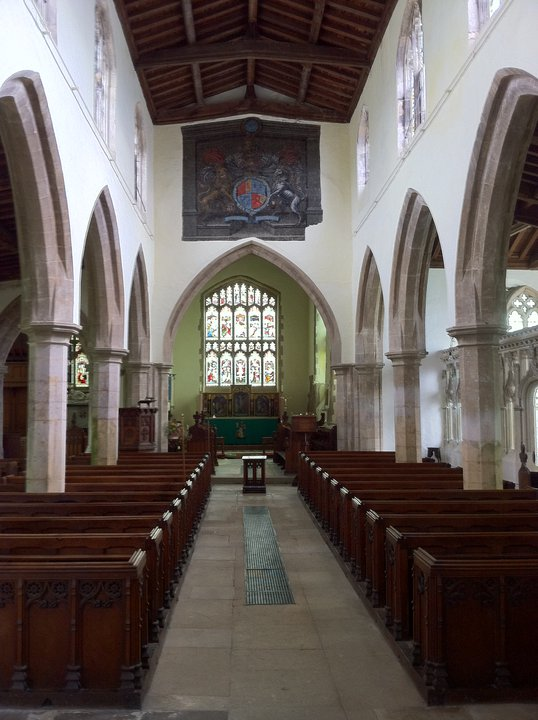
The nave

Although the church has early 14th-century origins, it is mainly late 14th and early 15th century, being built for the Greene family of Drayton House. A large heraldic shield dominates the nave, and the chancel bears the arms of the Greene family, and also that of John Heton, rector from 1406 to 1415. The list of clergy (see below) shows the appointments from Nicholas de Nevil in 1217, so the current building must have been a replacement for an earlier one.

The tower is topped with an octagonal lantern, flying buttresses and 12 pinnacles with golden weathervanes. Simon Jenkins noted that "the tower with its octagonal top is visible for miles around, a forest of pinnacles topped by golden weathervanes. From a distance they seem to flutter in the sun, like pennants summoning us to some forgotten Tudor tournament". The height of the tower, including the octagon, is 96 feet (29 metres).

An entry in the churchwardens' accounts records taking down the rood-loft and filling the holes in May 1644. In July 1645 payment was made for the "glazing of the windows when the crucifixion and scandalous pictures were taken down".

There were Victorian restorations in 1868–72 by Richard Herbert Carpenter and William Slater which consisted of repairs to roof and walls and re-seating, and further work in 1887. The reredos was made in 1930–31 as a memorial to Sackville George Stopford-Sackville, who died in 1926, to the design of the architect William Randoll Blacking. More repairs were carried out by the architect Eric Arthur Roberts in 1973–75.

== Stained glass and memorials ==
The north aisle windows have reset panels of a Jesse window from around 1330–40 depicting 16 figures. Some medieval glass also survives in the south chancel windows. There are six windows with 19th-century stained glass in the north and south aisles and also in the chancel.

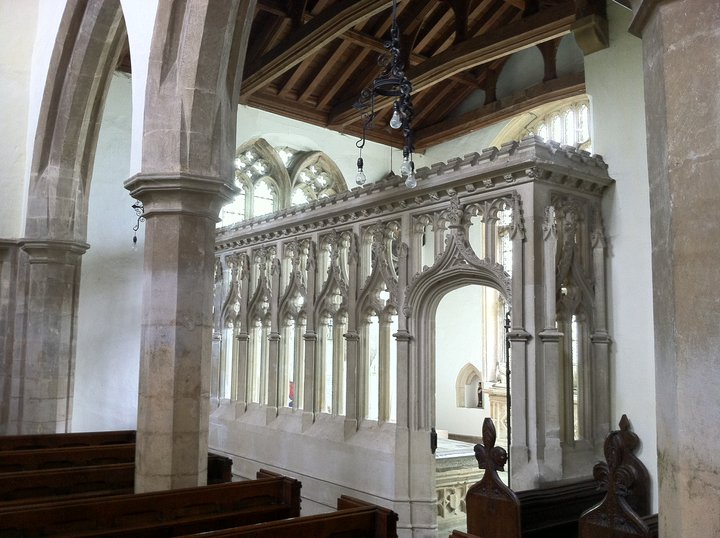
South chapel

In the chancel floor is the gravestone for John Heton, rector of Lowick from 1406 to 1415. The slab has a border inscription

Hic jacet Dominus Johannes de Heton quondam rector ecclesie de benyfelde et nuper de Lufwyck cujus anime propicietur Deus Amen. Credo quod Redemptor meus vivit et in novissimo die de terra surrectus sum et in carne mea videbo deum salvatorem.

Sir Ralfe Greene who died in 1417. He was Knight of the Shire for Northamptonshire, High Sheriff of Northamptonshire and Sheriff of Wiltshire. The memorial is by Thomas Prentys and Robert Sutton at a cost of £40. It is a pair of alabaster effigies on chest tomb in north chapel, with angels under canopies around the sides. A vaulted canopy is above the head of each figure, base of shafts to support canopy over whole.

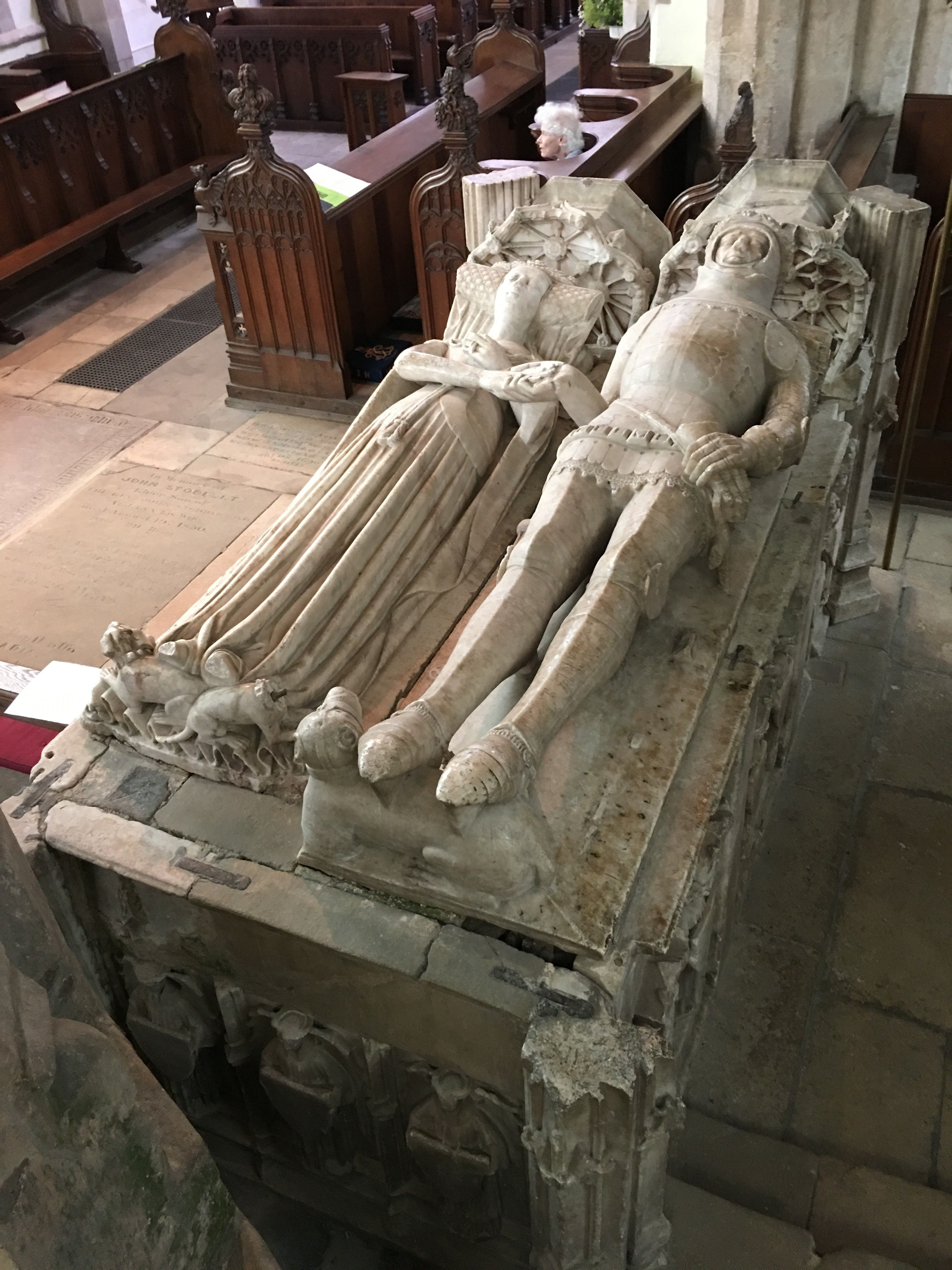
Chest tomb of Sir Ralfe Greene and wife from above.

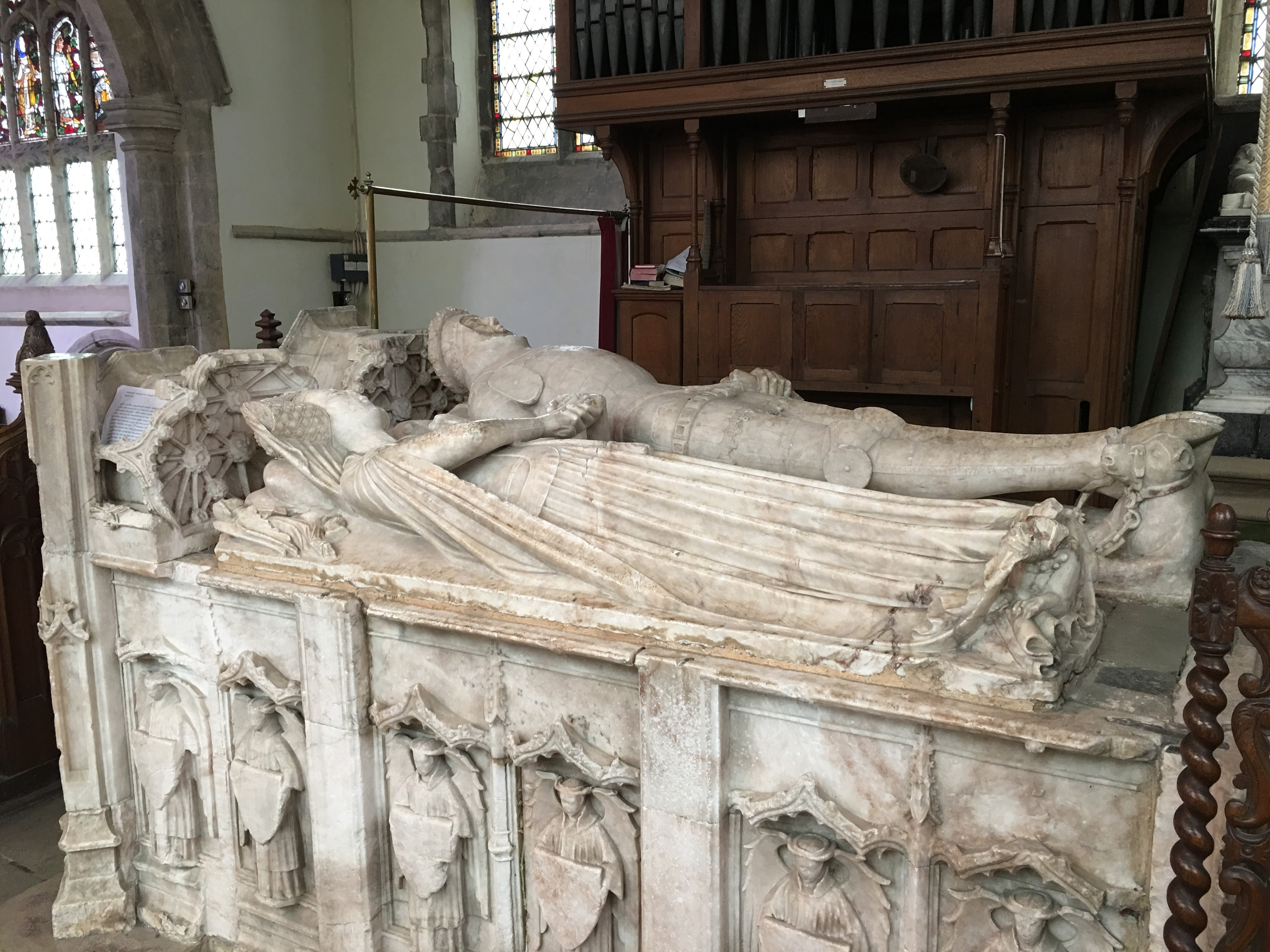
Chest tomb of Sir Ralfe Greene and wife from side.

In the south transept, a chest tomb memorial to Henry Green who died 22 February 1467 or 1468 and his wife. He wears a suit of armour with spurs, and his wife has a head-dress with horns. The shield of arms bears a chequered coat quartering an engrailed cross: small brass scrolls repeat the motto Da gloriam Deo.

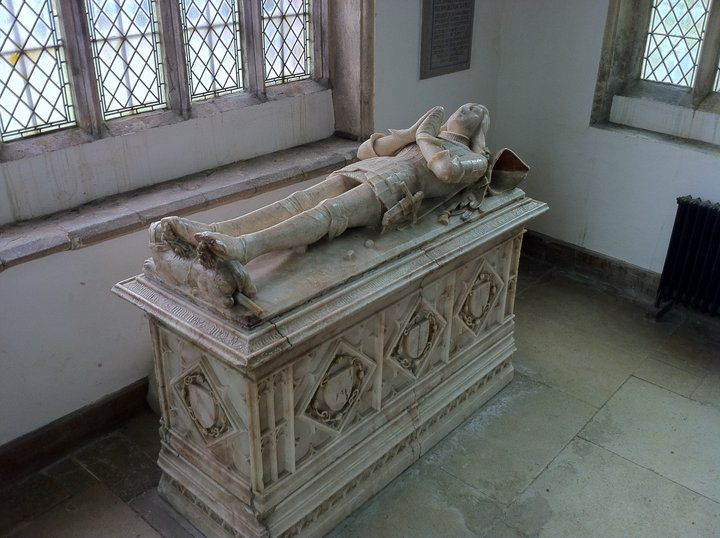
Tomb of Edward Stafford, 2nd Earl of Wiltshire

In the South Chapel on the south side is the memorial to Edward Stafford, 2nd Earl of Wiltshire, died 1499, who refounded the chantry and had the chapel rebuilt. His memorial is an alabaster effigy on chest tomb with lozenge panels inside cusped squared panels in the south transept. The inscription is formed by letters knotted in allusion to the badge of the house of Stafford.

A plain tablet in the north chapel remembers William, infant son of John Mordaunt, 1st Earl of Peterborough who died in 1625.

Inscribed tablets in the chancel floor commemorate Roger Lane who died in 1690 and John Halford who also died in 1690.

In front of the east window is the memorial for Mary Howard, Duchess of Norfolk (d. 1705). She was the daughter of the Henry Mordaunt, 2nd Earl of Peterborough and first wife of Sir John Germain, 1st Baronet (died 1718). The memorial is a semi-reclining white marble figure on chest tomb with bolection-moulded pilasters.

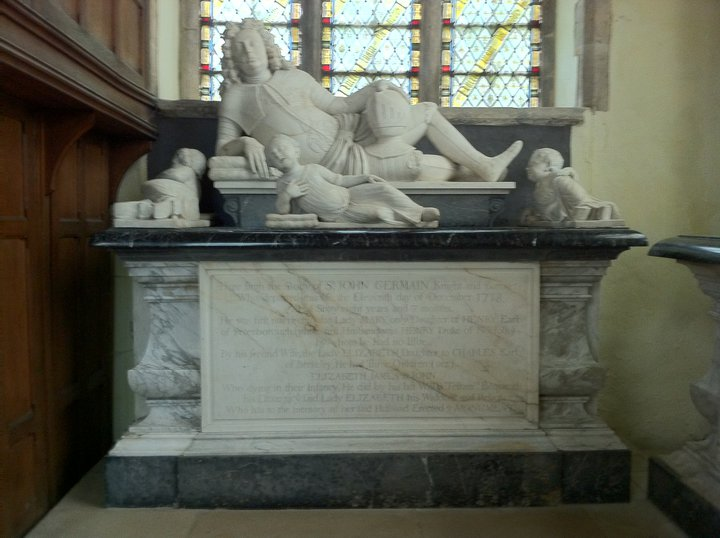
Memorial to Sir John Germain, 1st Baronet

On the north wall is the tomb of Sir John Germain, 1st Baronet who died in 1718, set as a semi-reclining marble figure in armour on a chest tomb.

There is an inscribed brass tablet to Lady Elizabeth Germain who died in 1760.

In the South Chapel in front of the east window is the memorial of Charles Sackville-Germain, 5th Duke of Dorset who died in 1843. It is a white marble chest-tomb by Richard Westmacott and has draped mantle, shield and coronet with lifesize angel seated alongside.

== Bells ==
The tower has a ring of six bells. The second and third bells were cast in about 1595 by a member of the Watts family of bellfounders of Leicester. The fifth bell was cast by an unknown founder in about 1599. The tenor was cast in 1619 by Hugh II Watts of Leicester. The fourth bell was recast by John Taylor & Co of Loughborough in 1884. The tower had a ring of five bells until the present treble bell was added in 1896, cast by John Taylor & Co.

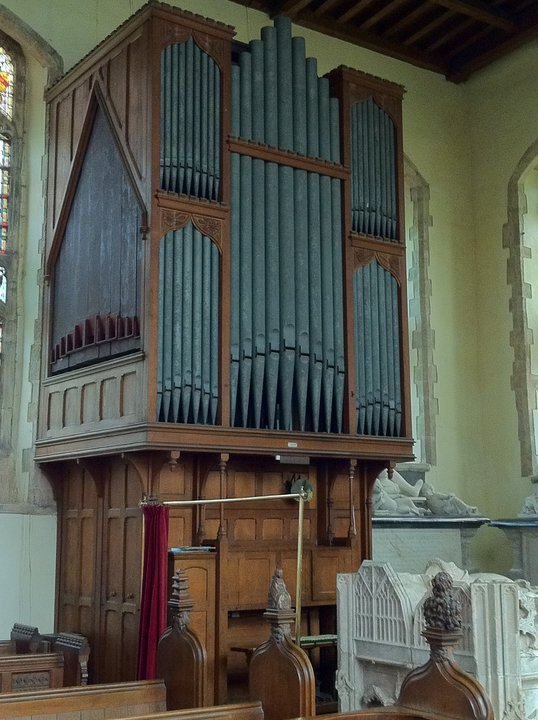
The organ

== Organ ==
The church had a pipe organ by Forster and Andrews installed in 1861. A specification of the organ can be found on the British Institute of Organ Studies National Pipe Organ Register at K00608. This organ has since been transferred to Warmington Methodist Church, and then to St. Mark's parish church, White Hills.

The current two-manual pipe organ is by Wordsworth and Maskell and dates from around 1900. A specification of the organ can be found on the British Institute of Organ Studies National Pipe Organ Register at D02178.

== Churchyard ==
The gravestones in the churchyard are mostly of the 18th and 19th centuries. A decorative coffin lid that dates from the 15th century survives by the wall of the South Chapel. At the east end of the church are a series of memorial graves of the Stopford Sackville family, who have lived in Drayton House since the late 18th century.

== List of rectors ==
- Nicholas de Nevil 1217
- Almaric de Nowers 1247
- Radulphus de Nowers 1303
- Radulphus de Drayton 1303–14
- Adam de Waltham 1314–20
- Johannes de Clypston 1320–49
- Johannes de Irthlynburgh 1349–57
- Johannes de Ryngestede 1357–79
- Henry Bolymere 1379–82
- Robert Normanton 1382–94
- Walter de St Germain 1394–1406
- John Heton 1406–15 (buried in the church)
- John Boys 1415–17
- John Glapthorn 1417–22
- John Boys (again) 1422–55
- John Martyn 1455–79
- Henry Smyth 1479–83
- William Peryn 1483–1509
- William Hamswayte 1509–35
- Edmund Mordante 1535–45
- Henry Quyk 1545–66
- Thomas Buckoke 1566–1603
- Robert Lingard 1603–47
- Joseph Bentham 1648–??
- Michael Poulton 1693–1720
- Robert Welborne 1720–44
- Richard Etough 1744–79
- Henry Etough 1779–95
- Thomas Fancourt 1795–97
- Joseph Jackson 1797–1815
- Robert Morgan Vane 1815–42
- John Stoddart 1842–55
- Henry George Middleton Pretyman 1855–70
- Main Swete Alexander Walrond 1870–73
- William Lucas Collins 1873–87
- John Sykes Watson 1887–1906
- Alfred Dicker 1906–25
- Arthur Sidney Hazel 1926–35
- Percival William Worster 1935–52
- Richard Clough 1952–59
- Wilfred Pakenham Pakenham-Walsh 1959–65
- Leslie Ronald Frank Buttle 1965–74
- Harry Bertram Davies 1974–81
- Cheslyn Peter Montague Jones 1981–87
- Michael James Thompson 1987–94
- Ronald Douglas Howe 1994–2000
- Hartley Roger Watson 2000–2008
- Simon John Plumley Fisher 2008-2011
- Colin Fletcher, Priest in charge
- Heather Lowe 2017
