= Ferguson Davie baronets =

Title in the Baronetage of the United Kingdom

Arms of Davie of Creedy in the parish of Sandford, Devon: Argent, a chevron sable between three mullets pierced gules. Quartered with arms of Davie of Crediton: Azure, three cinquefoils or on a chief of the last a lion passant gules

The Ferguson Davie Baronetcy, of Creedy in the County of Devon, is a title in the Baronetage of the United Kingdom. It was created on 9 January 1847 for Henry Ferguson Davie, a General in the Army and Member of Parliament for Haddington from 1847 to 1878. Born Henry Ferguson, he was the husband of Frances Juliana Davie, only surviving sister of Sir John Davie, 9th Baronet, of Creedy, and niece and heiress of Sir Humphrey Davie, 10th Baronet, of Creedy (on whose death in 1846 the Davie baronetcy of Creedy became extinct; see Davie baronets). In 1846 he assumed by Royal licence the additional surname of Davie. The second Baronet represented Barnstaple in the House of Commons as a Liberal.

== Ferguson Davie baronets, of Creedy (1847) ==
- Sir Henry Robert Ferguson Davie, 1st Baronet (1797–1885)
- Sir John Davie Ferguson Davie, 2nd Baronet (1830–1907)
- Sir William Augustus Ferguson Davie, CB, 3rd Baronet (1833–1915)
- Sir William John Ferguson Davie, 4th Baronet (1863–1947)
- Sir (Arthur) Patrick Ferguson Davie, 5th Baronet (1909–1988)
- Sir Antony Francis Ferguson Davie, 6th Baronet (1952–1997)
- Sir John Ferguson Davie, 7th Baronet (1906–2000)
- Sir Michael Ferguson Davie, 8th Baronet (born 1944)

The heir apparent to the baronetcy was James Michael Ferguson Davie (born 1970, died 1988), only son of the 8th Baronet. The heir presumptive is the present holder's brother Julian Anthony Ferguson Davie (born 1950). The heir presumptive's heir apparent is his son Charles John Ferguson Davie (born 1978).

== See also ==
- Davie baronets
