= Sir John Germain, 1st Baronet =

British soldier

Sir John Germain, 1st Baronet (c. May 1650 – 11 December 1718) was a British soldier and politician of Dutch origin who sat in the House of Commons between 1713 and 1718.

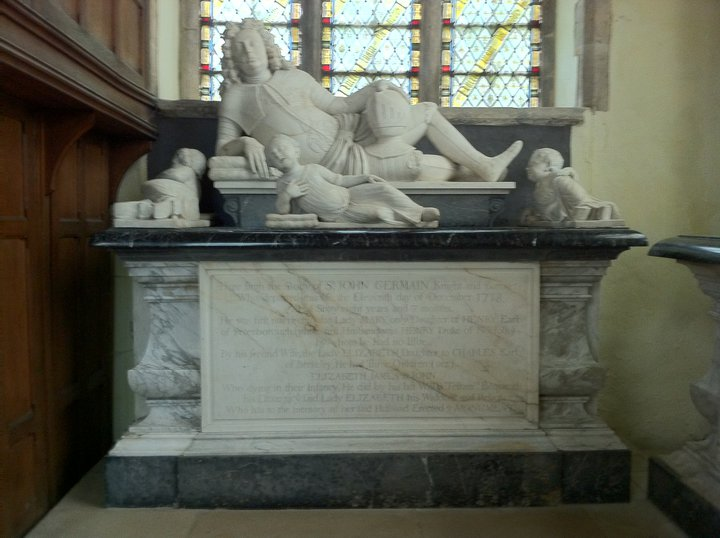
Memorial to Sir John Germain in St Peter's Church, Lowick

Germain passed as the son of John Germain, a private soldier in the Prince’s lifeguards, and his wife Mary Moll who was a mistress of William II, Prince of Orange. He was said to be an illegitimate half-brother of William III of England, and he encouraged this rumour himself. He lacked a proper education and was quite ignorant, but was a successful soldier and managed to acquire a fortune. He was described by John Evelyn as ‘a Dutch gamester . . . who had gotten much by gaming’.

In 1685, Germain was in England and began an affair with Mary Howard, Duchess of Norfolk, wife of Henry Howard, 7th Duke of Norfolk. After the Duke discovered them, Germain returned to Holland, only to return with King William in 1688. He enjoyed William’s favour and in 1689 he was aide-de-camp to the Dutch commander in Flanders. His brother was a merchant in London and was made a commissioner of wine licences in England. Germain was naturalized in 1689 and participated in the King’s campaign in Ireland. He resumed his affair with the Duchess of Norfolk, and in 1692 the Duke tried to divorce her by Act of Parliament but she opposed him in order to defend her inheritance, with the assistance of her father Henry Mordaunt, 2nd Earl of Peterborough. The bill was thrown out by the House of Lords, insisting that the accusations be first proved in a lower court and so the Duke brought a much-publicised action for criminal conversation against Germain in King’s Bench for £100,000. He won his case, but the jury awarded only £66 in damages.

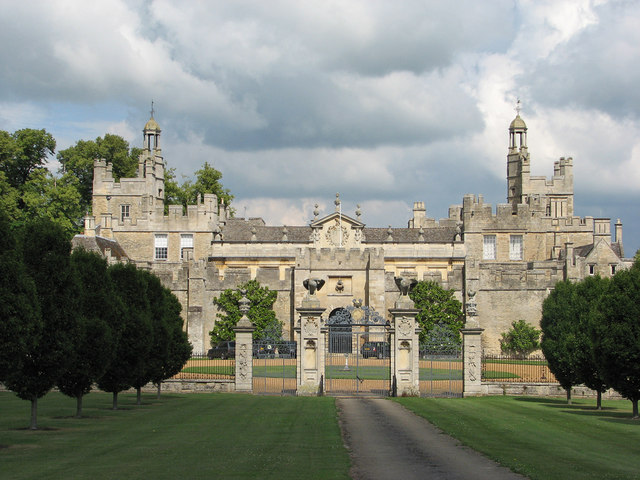
Drayton House, Northamptonshire

Germain was knighted on 26 February 1698, and created a baronet in the Baronetage of England on 25 March 1698. After an 8-year battle, the Duke finally obtained a divorce in 1700. The Duchess, who succeeded to the estate of Drayton, Northamptonshire and as Baroness Mordaunt on her father's death, married Germain by licence dated 15 September 1701.

On her death, on 17 November 1705, he inherited Drayton House. He married, as his second wife, Lady Elizabeth ("Betty") Berkeley in October 1706. The 3rd Earl of Peterborough had a claim to Drayton, but in November 1707 a case in the Queen’s Bench was decided in favour of Germain. Germain became involved in several unsuccessful schemes to resolve the difficulties of the Royal African Company. In 1709, he was proposed as a candidate at the Weobley by-election but did not go to the poll.

At the 1713 general election, Germain was elected Member of Parliament for Morpeth. He was classed as a Whig and voted against the expulsion of Richard Steele on 18 March 1714. He did not stand at the 1715 general election. He was returned unopposed as MP for Totnes in a by-election on 22 April 1717, following the death of Arthur Champernowne.

== Death ==
Germain died "of a mortification in his back" on 11 December 1718, aged 68. He encouraged his wife to remarry or to leave the estate to children of his friend Lionel Sackville, 1st Duke of Dorset.

She survived him until 1769 spending most of the rest of her life with the Duke and Duchess of Dorset at Knole. She left the Drayton estate to Lionel's son Lord George Sackville, who adopted the surname Germain.

There are memorials to Sir John Germain, his two wives and his three children (who died young) in St Peter's Church, Lowick, Northamptonshire.

Parliament of Great Britain
Preceded by Sir Richard Sandford; Christopher Wandesford	Member of Parliament for Morpeth; 1713–1715; With: Oley Douglas	Succeeded by Viscount Morpeth; The Viscount Castlecomer
Preceded by Stephen Northleigh; Arthur Champernowne	Member of Parliament for Totnes; 1717–1718; With: Stephen Northleigh	Succeeded by Stephen Northleigh; Sir Charles Wills
Baronetage of England
New creation	Baronet (of Westminster); 1698–1718	Extinct
