= Stephen Northleigh =

Stephen Northleigh (?1692-?1731), of Peamore, Exminster, Devon, was an English politician who sat in the House of Commons from 1713 to 1727.

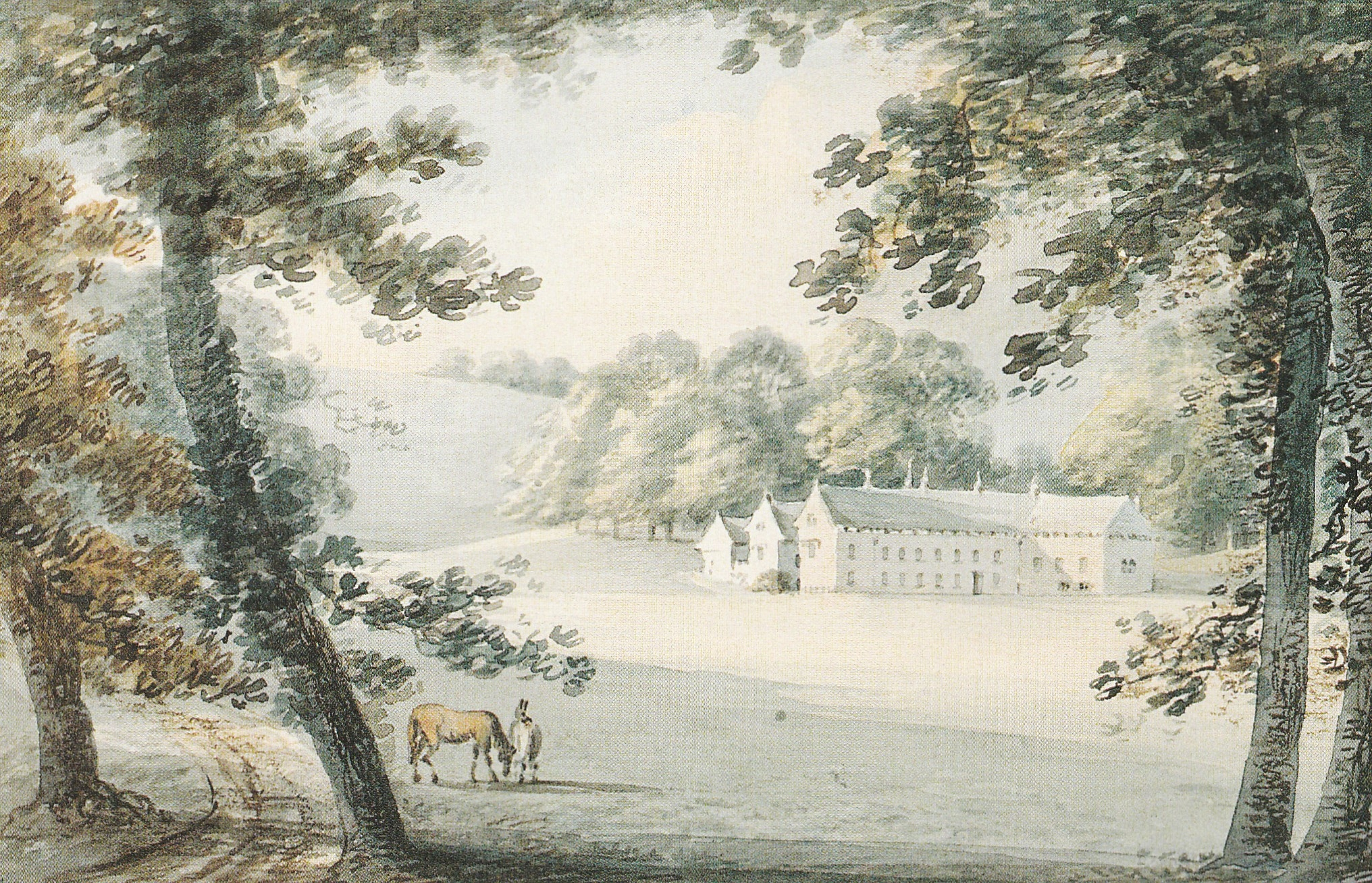
Peamore, Exminster, 1794

Northleigh was the eldest surviving son of Henry Northleigh. His father died in 1694, leaving him indebted estates, and he became the stepson of Edward Yarde. He matriculated at Exeter College, Oxford on 17 April 1711, aged 18. He married Margaret Davie, daughter of Sir William Davie, 4th Baronet of Creedy, Devon on 2 December 1714.

At the 1713 general election Northleigh was returned unopposed on the Yarde interest as Member of Parliament (MP) for Totnes. He was returned again at Totnes in 1715 but did not stand at the 1722 general election.

Northleigh probably died in 1731. He had married Margaret Davie, daughter of Sir William Davie, 4th Baronet of Creedy, Devon on 2 December 1714 and left two daughters. His estate passed to his daughter Mary Northleigh, who married John Hippisley Coxe (1715-1769) of Ston Easton, Somerset.

Parliament of Great Britain
Preceded by Thomas Coulson; Francis Gwyn	Member of Parliament for Totnes; 1713 – 1722; With: Francis Gwyn; Arthur Champernowne; Sir John Germain, Bt; Charles Wills	Succeeded by Joseph Banks; Charles Wills
