= Davie baronets =

Title in the Baronetage of England

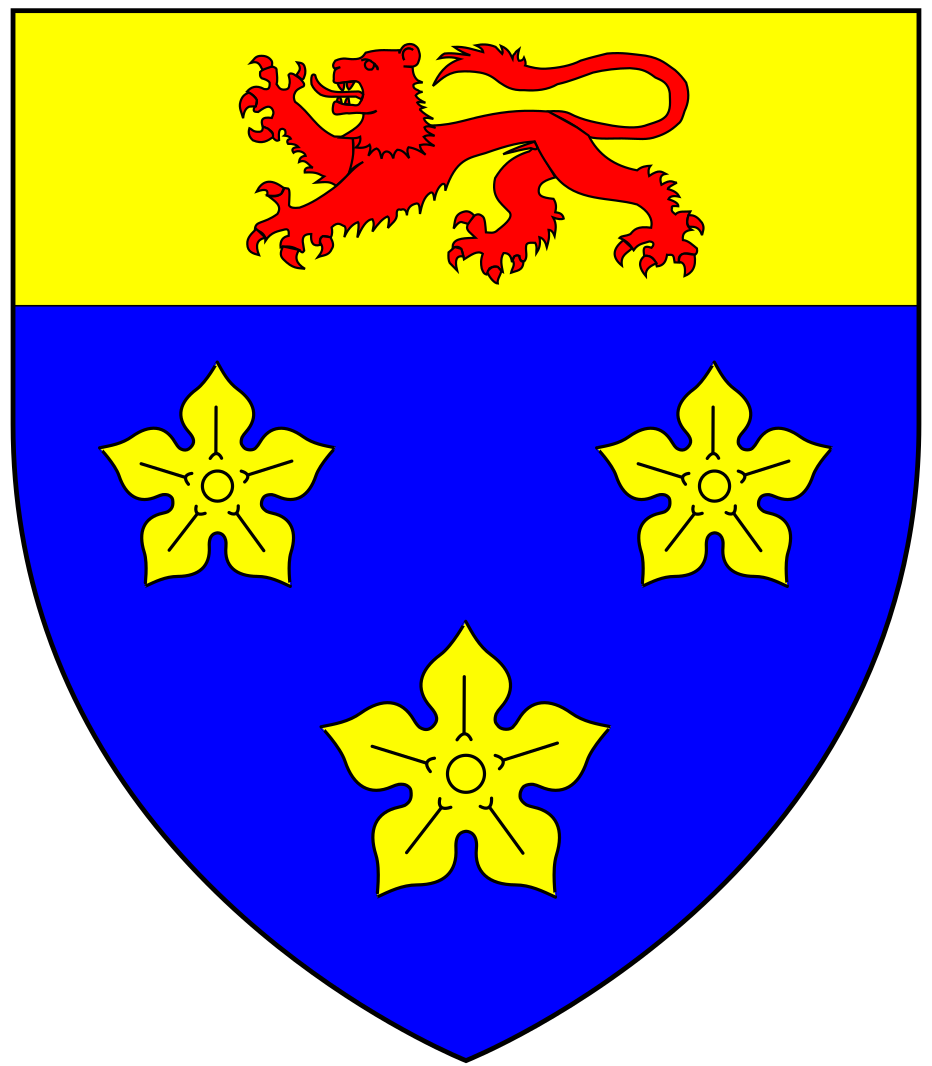
Arms of Davie (ancient) of Creedy in the parish of Sandford, Devon: Azure, three cinquefoils or on a chief of the last a lion passant gules

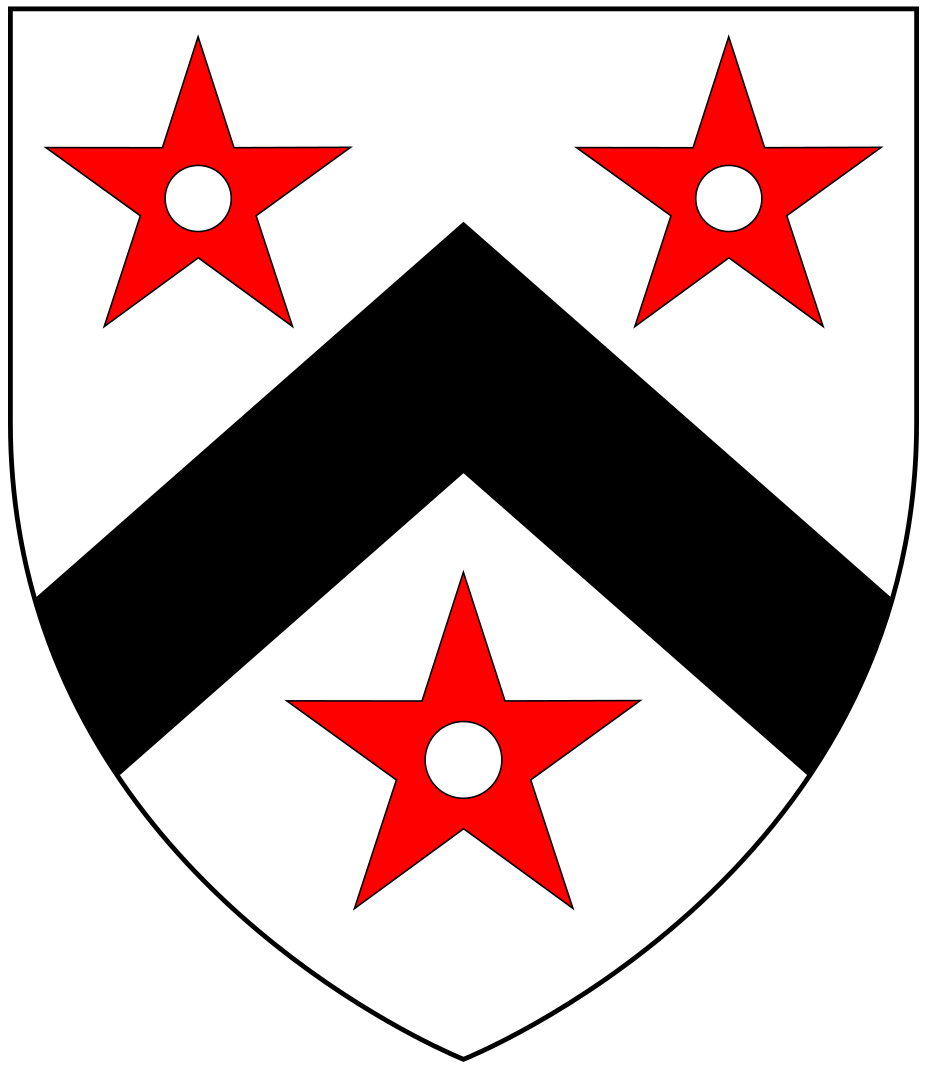
Arms of Davie (modern) of Creedy in the parish of Sandford, Devon: Argent, a chevron sable between three mullets pierced gules

The Davie Baronetcy, of Creedy in the County of Devon, was a title in the Baronetage of England. It was created on 9 September 1641 for John Davie, the Member of Parliament for Tiverton in 1621–22.

== Davie baronets, of Creedy (1641) ==
- Sir John Davie, 1st Baronet (c. 1589–1654) MP for Tiverton 1621–22
- Sir John Davie, 2nd Baronet (1612–1678), son, MP for Tavistock 1661, Sheriff of Devon in 1671.
- Sir John Davie, 3rd Baronet (1660–1692), nephew, MP for Saltash 1679–85, Sheriff of Devon in 1688, died unmarried.
- Sir William Davie, 4th Baronet (1662–1707), younger brother
- Sir John Davie, 5th Baronet (died 1727), first cousin
- Sir John Davie, 6th Baronet (1700–1737), son
- Sir John Davie, 7th Baronet (1734–1792), son
- Sir John Davie, 8th Baronet (1772–1803), son
- Sir John Davie, 9th Baronet (1798–1824), son
- Sir Humphrey Phineas Davie, 10th Baronet (1775–1846), uncle. Baronetcy extinct on his death.

== See also ==
- Ferguson-Davie baronets
