= Creedy, Sandford =

Historic estate in Devon, England

Coordinates: 50.8025°N 3.6584°W

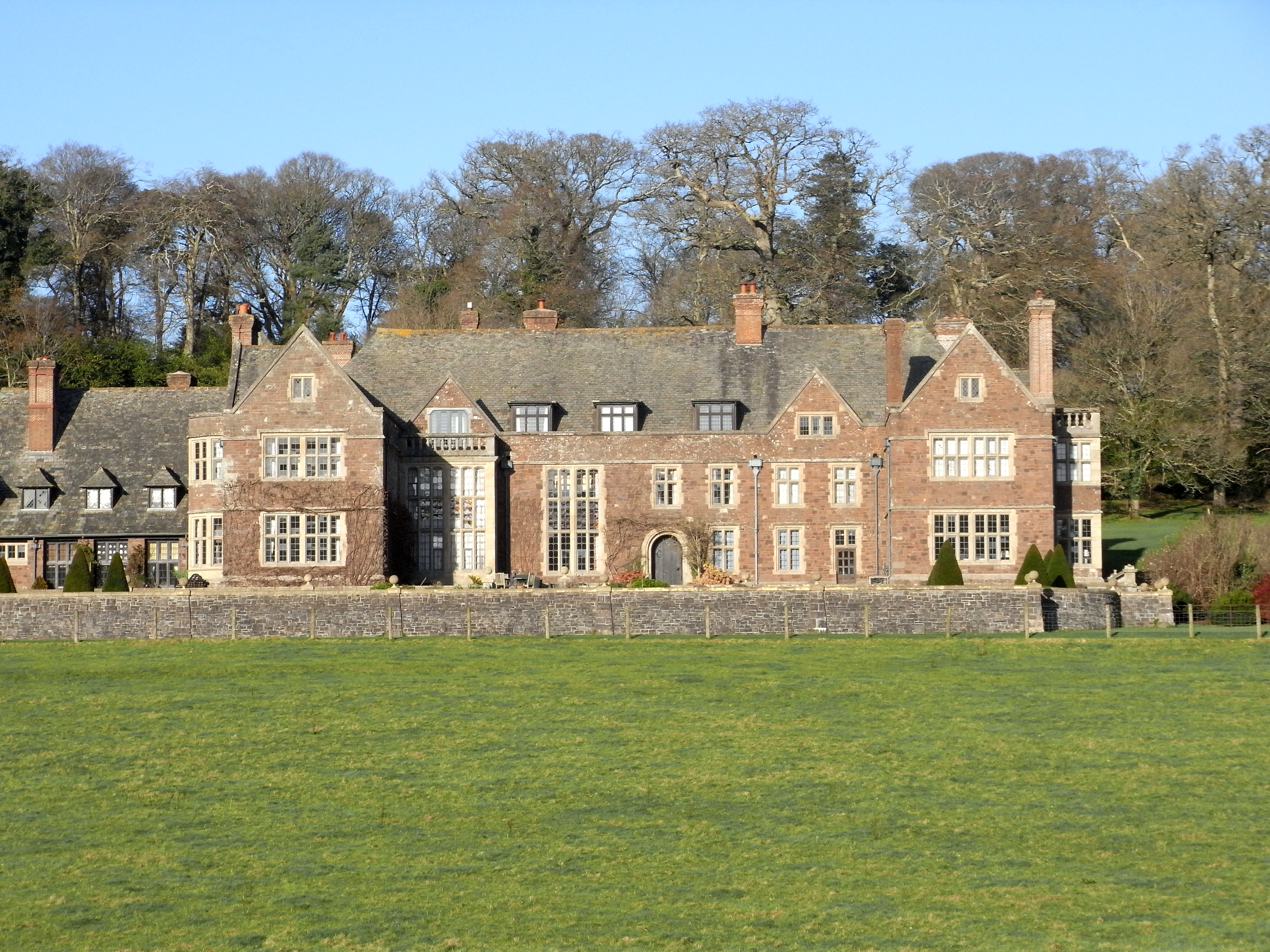
Creedy Park, Sandford, Devon, south front in 2014. This is the present house rebuilt in 1916-21

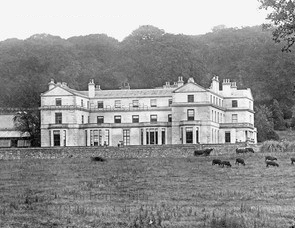
Creedy Park, Sandford, Devon, south front in 1904. This is the house built in 1846 and destroyed by fire in 1915

Creedy is an historic estate in the parish of Sandford, near Crediton in Devon. It is named from its location on the west side of the River Creedy. It was the seat of the Davie family (created Davie baronets in 1641) from about 1600 until the late 20th century. The mansion house on the estate has been called at various times New House, Creedy House, and as presently, Creedy Park. It was first built in about 1600, rebuilt in 1846, burnt down in 1915 and rebuilt 1916–21. It is surrounded by a large park, the boundary of which is enclosed by a stone and brick wall several miles long.

== Location ==
According to the Devon historians Pole (died 1635) and Risdon (died 1640), anciently several different estates named "Creedy" existed within West Budleigh hundred in the general area of the River Creedy near or in the parishes of Sandford, on the west side of the river, and Shobrooke, on the east side of the river. It is not possible to identify today's estate with certainty to one of these ancient estates. They were as follows:

=== Creedy Hilion ===
Creedy Hilion, stated by Pole to have been held by the Hilion family of Asheriston (Ashton) until at least the reign of King Edward III (1327–1377). It then passed to the Dowrish family, of Dowrish in the parish of Sandford. By Dowrish it was then sold to George Carew (1497/8–1583), Archdeacon of Exeter, whose daughter Mary Carew (died 1604) (whose monumental brass survives in Sandford Church) married Walter Dowrish of Dowrish, and descended successively to his sons Sir Peter Carew (died 1575), slain in Ireland, of Upton Helion, near Crediton, and George Carew, 1st Earl of Totnes (1555–1629), who sold it to Walter Yonge (1579–1649), MP for Honiton, of Upton Hilion and of Colyton.

=== Creedy Peitevin / Creedy Widger ===
According to Pole Creedy Peitevin was held by the Peitevin or Peytevin family (Latinized to Pictavensis) until the reign of King Henry III (1216–1272), when it passed by an heiress to Sir John Wiger, whose son Henry Wiger sold it to William Lord Martin, feudal baron of Barnstaple. It followed the descent of that barony and was the inheritance of Margaret Audley (died 1373), from whom it passed to her descendants the Fitzwarins and Bourchiers. By Bourchier it was sold to John Prideaux (1520–1558) of Nutwell, Serjeant at Law and MP for Devon and Plymouth. Prideaux sold it to Sir William Peryam (1534–1604), of Little Fulford, on the east side of the River Creedy, in the parish of Shobrooke, Lord Chief Baron of the Exchequer. Sir William Pole (died 1635) writes with great authority on this subject, as his first wife was Mary Peryam (died 1606), whom he married in 1583 at Shobrooke, one of the four daughters and co-heiresses of Sir William Peryam. Concerning the estate called in his day Creedy Wiger, he wrote that Peryam "bwilt theire a fayre dwellinge howse & left it to descend unto his fowre daughters, Mary my wife..." etc. It is well established however that the house Peryam built and lived at was Little Fulford, in the parish of Shobrooke, which Pole thus seems to make identical with Creedy Wiger. The four Peryam daughters sold Creedy Wiger to Sir William Peryam's brother John Peryam of Exeter, who left it to his eldest daughter Mary Peryam, the wife of Richard Reynell, younger son of Mr Reynell of Malston. Richard and Mary Reynell made it their home. Their daughter, also named Mary, married a Reynell cousin, Sir Richard Reynell: they were the parents of Sir Thomas Reynell and Sir Richard Reynell, 1st Baronet.

== Descent ==
=== Davie ===
==== John Davie ====
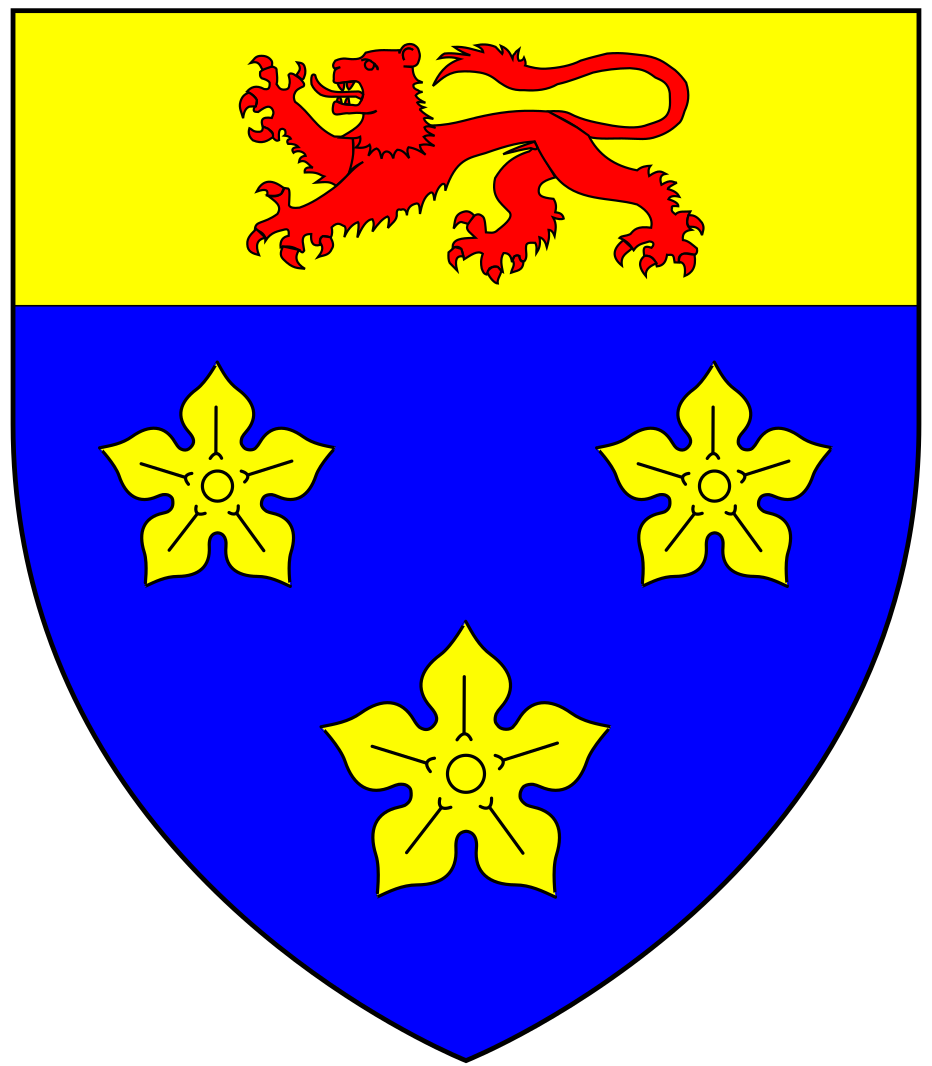
Davie of Creedy arms: Azure, three cinquefoils or on a chief of the last a lion passant gules These arms were used by John Davie (died 1611/12) and by his son the 1st Baronet

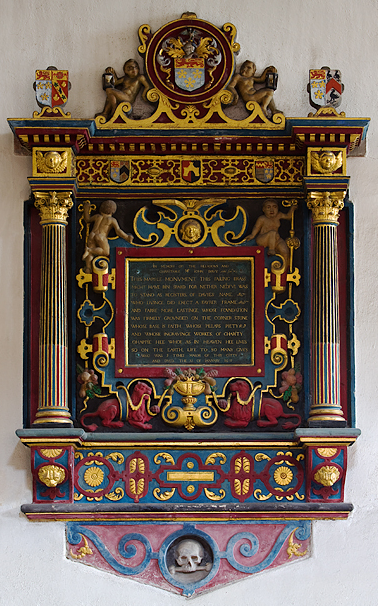
Mural monument to John Davie (died 1611), St Mary Arches Church, Exeter.

John Davie (1541/2-1611/2) of Exeter, Crediton and Creedy, fourth son of Robert Davie (d. circa 1570), a wealthy cloth merchant of Crediton. He was three times Mayor of Exeter, in 1584, 1594 and 1604, and in about 1600 built the first recorded mansion on the Creedy estate which was called "New House". The Devon historian Sir William Pole (died 1635) wrote concerning Credy: "Mr John Davy of Exceter hath bwilded a newe howse in this place & called it New-Howse unto w^{ch} hee added a fair demesnes w^{ch} hee hath left unto John Davy Esq his sonne & hath a mannor called Credy which adjoineth unto his demesnes". He married twice, by his first wife he left no issue, as his second wife he married Margaret Southcott, daughter of George Southcott of Calverleigh, Devon, second son of John Southcott (died 1556) of Indio in the parish of Bovey Tracey, Devon, by whom he had a son and heir Sir John Davie, 1st Baronet (died 1654) and a daughter Margaret Davie, wife of Gideon Haydon of Cadhay, Epford and Woodbury.

He founded two alms houses, one in the parish of St Mary Arches, Exeter, and another in Crediton, each for relief of two poor men and their wives, and two single persons. His monument survives in St Mary Arches church in Exeter.

==== Sir John Davie, 1st Baronet (died 1654) ====
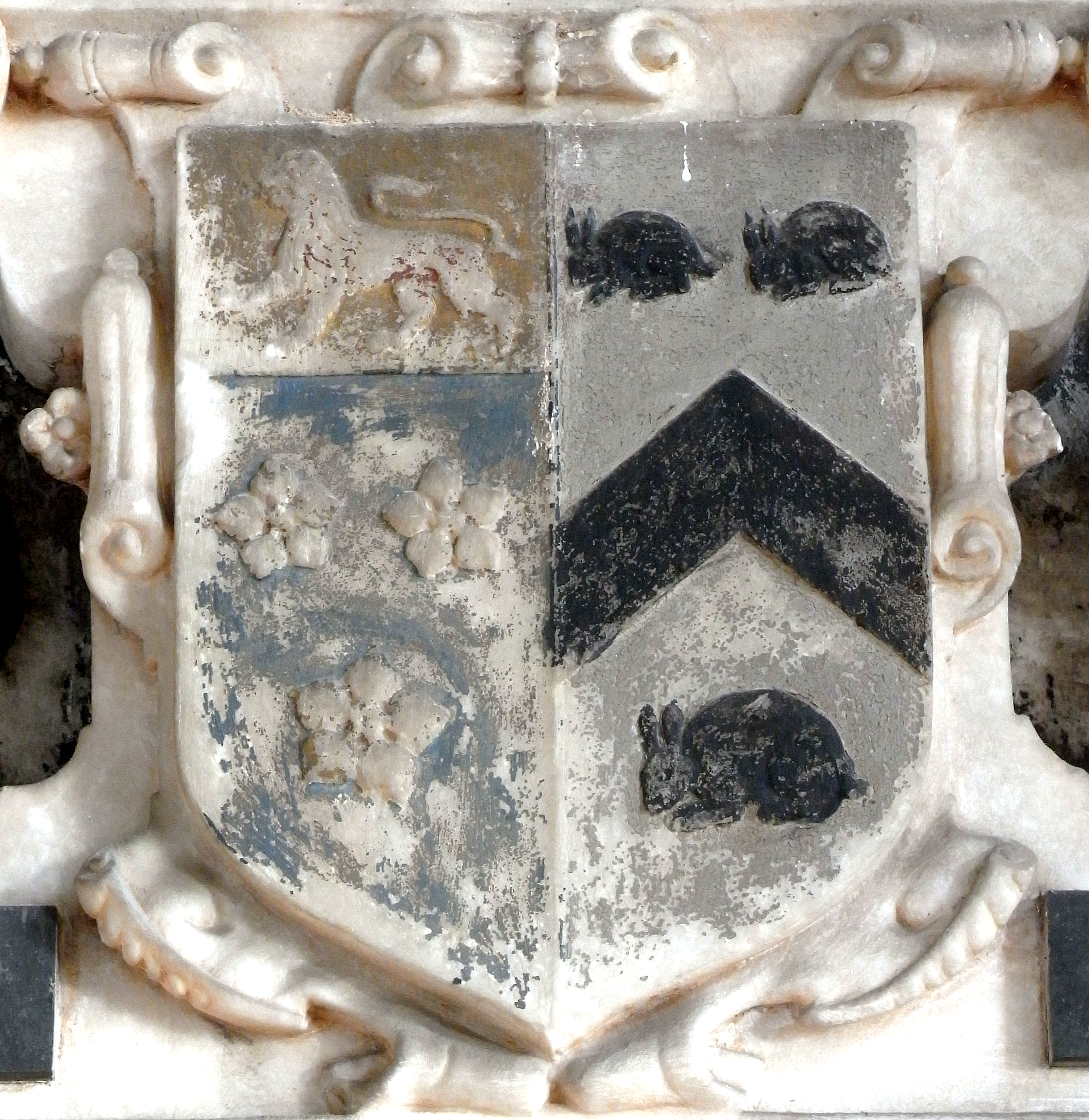
Arms of Sir John Davie, 1st Baronet (1588–1654) of Creedy: Azure, three cinquefoils or on a chief of the last a lion passant gules impaling: Argent, a chevron between three conies courant sable (Strode of Newnham). Detail from mural monument to his wife Juliana Strode (died 1627), Sandford Church

Sir John Davie, 1st Baronet (died 1654), son and heir. He was Member of Parliament for Tiverton in 1621–22 and was created a baronet in 1641. He married twice: firstly to his second cousin Juliana Strode (died 1627), a daughter of Sir William Strode (1562–1637), MP, of Newnham, Plympton St Mary, Devon, by his 1st wife Mary Southcote (died 1617), daughter of Thomas Southcote, of Indio, Bovey Tracey. She was a sister of William Strode (1594–1645), MP, one of the Five Members whose attempted arrest in the House of Commons by King Charles I in 1642 sparked the Civil War. By his first wife he had children including Sir John Davie, 2nd Baronet (1612–1678), his son and heir. Secondly he married Isabel Hele (died 1656) of Gnaton, Devon, by whom he had a daughter Isabell Davie (1631–1673), who in 1649 married Sir Walter Yonge, 2nd Baronet (c. 1625 – 1670), MP, of Colyton, Devon.

==== Sir John Davie, 2nd Baronet (1612–1678) ====
Sir John Davie, 2nd Baronet (1612–1678), son and heir by his father's 1st marriage. He was MP for Tavistock, Devon, in 1661 and was Sheriff of Devon from 1670 to 1671. He married four times, but left no surviving male children. By his second wife Tryphena Reynell (died 1659), daughter and co-heiress of Richard Reynell, MP, of Lower Creedy, he had one son, John Davie (died 1668), who predeceased his father unmarried, and a daughter Tryphena Davie (died 1668).

==== Sir John Davie, 3rd Baronet (1660–1692) ====
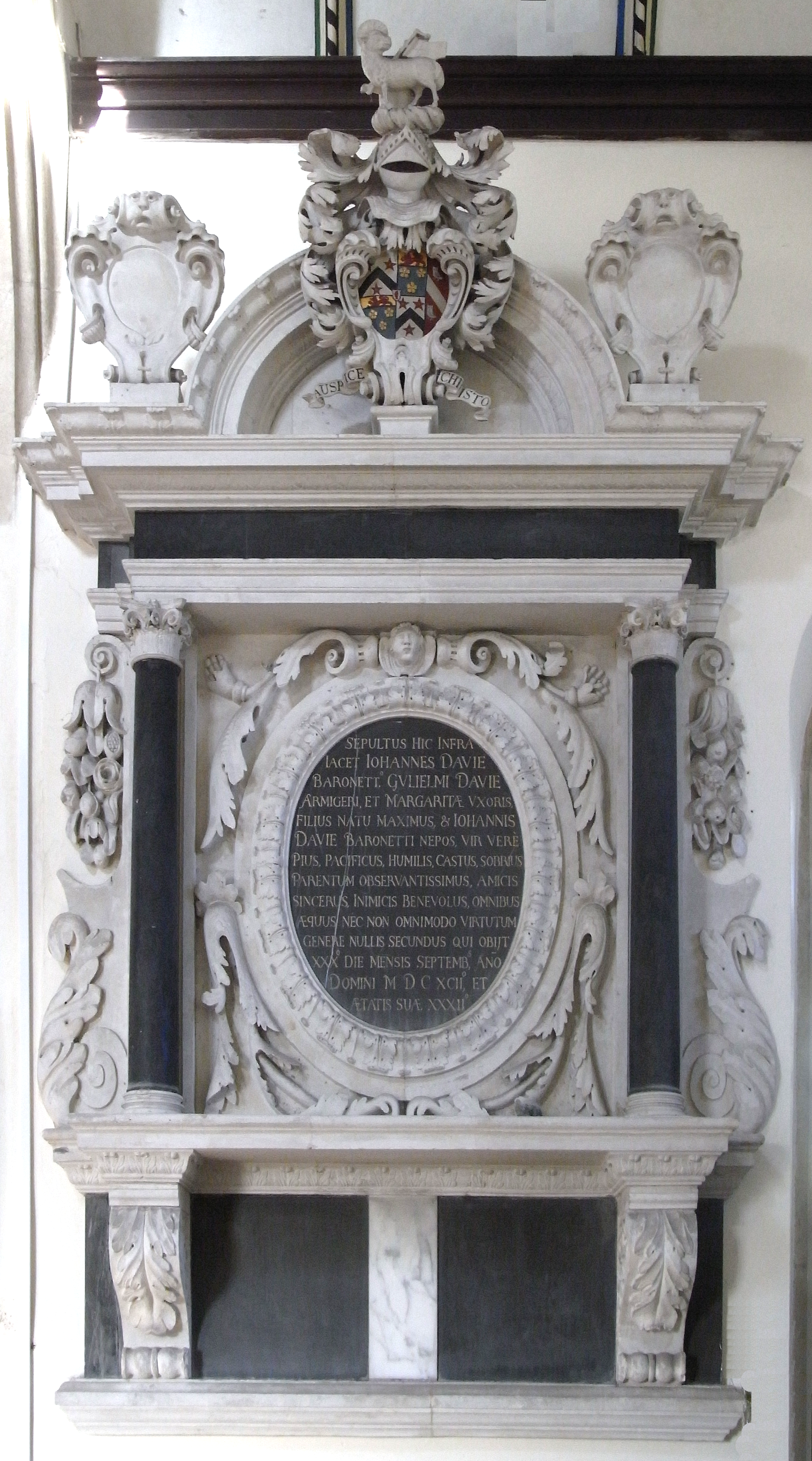
Mural monument to John Davie, 3rd Baronet (1660–1692) of Creedy. North wall of chancel, Sandford Church

Sir John Davie, 3rd Baronet (1660–1692) (nephew), was the eldest son of William Davie (1614–1663) of Dara(?), Barrister-at-Law. He was MP for Saltash 1679–85. He died unmarried and his mural monument survives in Sandford Church.

==== Sir William Davie, 4th Baronet (1662–1707) ====
Sir William Davie, 4th Baronet (1662–1707) (younger brother). He married twice: firstly to Mary Steadman, heiress of Downside, Midsomer Norton, Somerset, by whom he had a daughter Mary Davie (born 1688), who married Nicholas Hooper of Raleigh, Pilton, in North Devon. Her mural monument survives in Sandford Church, erected by John Hippisley Coxe (1715–1769), builder of the grand mansion Ston Easton Park in Somerset. Her heirs to Downside were her half-nephews descended from her half-sister Margaret Davie, wife of Stephen Northleigh (c.1692-?1731) of Peamore, Exminster, MP for Totnes (1713–1722), whose daughter and heiress was Mary Northleigh, wife of John Hippisley Coxe (1715–1769). The 4th Baronet married secondly to Abigail Pollexfen (died 1725), by whom he had four daughters and co-heiresses, including Margaret Northleigh and Frances (died 1748), married to Sir George Chudleigh, 4th Baronet (died 1738). The 4th Baronet died with no sons, when the heir to Creedy and the baronetcy was his first cousin Sir John Davie, 5th Baronet (died 1727).

==== Sir John Davie, 5th Baronet (1657-1727) ====
Sir John Davie, 5th Baronet (born 1657 died 1727) (first cousin). He was the eldest son of Humphry Davie (born 1625) (a younger son of the 1st Baronet), a merchant of London, by his wife Mary White. Humphrey Davie was a puritan, and a member of the Drapers’ and Merchant Adventurers’ Companies who went to America in 1662. Sir John married a certain Elizabeth (died 1713), by whom he had children 2 daughters and 6 sons, including his eldest son and heir Sir John Davie, 6th Baronet (1700–1737).

==== Sir John Davie, 6th Baronet (1700–1737) ====
Sir John Davie, 6th Baronet (1700–1737) (eldest son). He married Elizabeth Acland (died 1738), daughter of John Acland (died 1703) of Wooleigh, Devon, heir apparent to his father Sir Hugh Acland, 5th Baronet (died 1714), MP for Tiverton, of Killerton House, Devon, and sister of Sir Hugh Acland, 6th Baronet (1697–1728) of Killerton, MP. The Aclands were one of the most ancient and most prominent of Devon families. A portrait of Elizabeth Acland (died 1738) (Lady Davie) survives at Killerton House, now the property of the National Trust, which shows the new mullet armorials of Davie impaling Acland. By his wife Elizabeth Acland he had 3 sons, including Sir John Davie, 7th Baronet (1734–1792), eldest son and heir.

==== Sir John Davie, 7th Baronet (1734–1792) ====
Sir John Davie, 7th Baronet (1734–1792), (eldest son). He married a certain Catherine (died 1776), by whom he had six daughters and four sons, including Sir John Davie, 8th Baronet (1772–1803), his second surviving son and heir.

==== Sir John Davie, 8th Baronet (1772–1803), ====
Sir John Davie, 8th Baronet (1772–1803) (second surviving son). In 1796 he married Anne Lemon (1766–1812), daughter of Sir William Lemon, 1st Baronet (1748–1824), of Carclew House, near Mylor, Cornwall. His hunting seat was Fernworthy, near Chagford, Dartmoor, Devon. He left two daughters and two twin sons including Sir John Davie, 9th Baronet (1798–1824), his eldest son and heir.

==== Sir John Davie, 9th Baronet (1798–1824) ====
Sir John Davie, 9th Baronet (1798–1824) (eldest son). He died unmarried, having outlived his twin younger brother William Davie, who died without children. His heir was his uncle Sir Humphrey Phineas Davie, 10th Baronet (1775–1846), fourth son of the 7th Baronet.

==== Sir Humphrey Phineas Davie, 10th Baronet (1775–1846) ====
Sir Humphrey Phineas Davie, 10th Baronet (1775–1846) (uncle). He was the 4th son of the 7th Baronet. In 1825 he built Sandford School, which survives in use today, a "surprisingly grand" building in the form of an ancient Greek temple with Doric columns and a large pediment on which was originally sculpted the Davie crest. He died unmarried and was the last in the male line of the Davie family descended from the 1st Baronet, and on his death the baronetcy became extinct. His mural monument, showing a relief sculpture by Edward Bowring Stephens of The Good Samaritan survives in Sandford Church, together with the east stained-glass window of that church, erected in his memory by his neighbours, tenants and friends.

=== Ferguson (Davie) ===
==== Sir Henry Ferguson Davie, 1st Baronet (1797–1885) ====
Sir Henry Robert Ferguson Davie, 1st Baronet (1797–1885) (husband of niece). On the death of the 10th Baronet in 1846, the heir to Creedy and his other estates was his niece Frances Juliana Davie (1802–1882), 2nd daughter of the 8th Baronet and wife of General Henry Robert Ferguson (1797–1885), MP for Haddington, Scotland, from 1847 to 1878. He was the son of Robert Ferguson (1767–1840) of Raith, Whig Member of Parliament for Fifeshire, Haddingtonshire and Kirkcaldy Burghs, and Lord Lieutenant of the county of Fife. In 1846, in accordance with the terms of the 10th Baronet's will, he adopted by royal licence the surname and arms of Davie in addition to his patronymic, and was created a baronet on 9 January 1847. He rebuilt Creedy House in 1846. His eldest son Henry Davie Ferguson-Davie (1825–1850), a lieutenant in the Rifle Brigade, predeceased him, and is the subject of a monument on the south chancel wall in Sandford Church inscribed as follows:

"Sacred to the memory of Henry Davie Ferguson Davie, Lieutenant Rifle Brigade; eldest and beloved son of Sir Henry Robert Ferguson Davie Bart., and of Frances Juliana his wife. Born May 26th 1825, died November 29th 1850. During his short military career he served his country in various quarters of the globe, and was cut off in the prime of life to the inexpressible grief of his sorrowing family; honoured and lamented by his brother officers, and affectionately remembered by a numerous circle of relations and friends".

==== Sir John Ferguson Davie, 2nd Baronet (1830–1907) ====
Sir John Davie Ferguson Davie, 2nd Baronet (1830–1907) (2nd surviving son), also seated at Derllys Court, Carmarthenshire, Wales, and Bittescombe Manor, Upton, Somerset. He was a captain, Grenadier Guards, Liberal MP for Barnstaple, Devon, 1859–65 and High Sheriff of Carmarthenshire in 1873. In 1857 he married Edwina Augusta Williams (died 1889), 3rd daughter of Sir James Williams-Drummond, Baronet, of Derllys Court and Edwinsford, Llandeilo, Carmarthenshire, Wales, and of Clovelly Court, Devon, MP for Carmarthenshire in 1831, by his wife Lady Mary Fortescue (died 1874), whom he married in 1823, 4th daughter of Hugh Fortescue, 1st Earl Fortescue (1753–1841), of Castle Hill, Filleigh, Devon. he had only one daughter Mary Fanny ferguson Davie (1857–1857) who died an infant. Memorials exist in sandford Church to Lady Davie (a stained glass window) and to her husband the 2nd Baronet, a brass tablet erected by his brother and heir Sir William Augustus Ferguson Davie, 3rd Baronet (1833–1915).

==== Sir William Augustus Ferguson Davie, 3rd Baronet (1833–1915) ====
Sir William Augustus Ferguson Davie, 3rd Baronet (1833–1915), CB, (younger brother). He was Senior Clerk of the House of Commons. Before his inheritance he lived at Stokeleigh, Weybridge. He married Frances Harriet Miles, 5th daughter of Sir William Miles, 1st Baronet (1797–1878), of Leigh Court, near Bristol, Somerset, by whom he had two daughters and six sons, two of whom were killed in action during World War I, as their monuments in Sandford Church record, namely his third son Lt.Col. Arthur Francis Ferguson Davie (1867–1916), killed in Mesopotamia and his fifth son Herbert George Ferguson Davie (1873–1915), killed in the Dardanelles. His own brass memorial tablet survives in Sandford Church.

==== Sir William John Ferguson Davie, 4th Baronet (1863–1947) ====
Sir William John Ferguson Davie, 4th Baronet (1863–1947) (eldest son). Creedy House burnt down in November 1915, at about the time of his father's death, and he quickly set about rebuilding it between 1916 and 1921, in a "conservative Jacobean" style, in dark stone which made it "rather forbidding".

==== Sir (Arthur) Patrick Ferguson Davie, 5th Baronet (1909–1988) ====
Rev. Sir (Arthur) Patrick Ferguson Davie, 5th Baronet (1909–1988) (nephew), son of Lt.Col. Arthur Francis Ferguson Davie (1867–1916), CIE, DSO, 3rd son of the 3rd baronet and Eleanor Blanche Daphne, elder daughter of the Charles Topham Naylor. He was an honorary chaplain to the Bishop of Exeter, and Rural Dean of Cadbury, Devon. He commissioned the College of Arms to investigate whether he might be able to claim the abeyant Barony of Bardolph, but was advised that the Duke of Norfolk would have a stronger claim. In 1949 he married Iris Dawn Cable-Buller, daughter of Captain Michael Francis Buller. In 1960 a banquet was held in the great hall for Princess Margaret, who stayed the night at Creedy Park as a guest of the 5th Baronet, after having unveiled a statue to St Boniface in Holy Cross Church, Crediton, on Sunday 24 July 1960. In 1982 Creedy House, having been sold, was converted into 13 residential units, and continues today in ownership of ten residents, with 15 acres of communal woodland.

==== Sir Antony Francis Ferguson Davie, 6th Baronet (1952–1997) ====
Sir Antony Francis Ferguson Davie, 6th Baronet (1952–1997) (son), who died childless.

The present representative of the Ferguson-Davie family is Sir Michael Ferguson Davie, 8th Baronet (born 1944), who lived in 2014 at Evercreech, Shepton Mallet, Somerset, son and heir of Sir John Ferguson Davie, 7th Baronet (1906–2000), son of Edward Cruger Ferguson-Davie (1868–1948), fourth son of the 3rd Baronet.

== Sources ==
- Vivian, Lt.Col. J.L., (Ed.) The Visitations of the County of Devon: Comprising the Heralds' Visitations of 1531, 1564 & 1620, Exeter, 1895, pp. 269–272, pedigree of Davie
- Risdon, Tristram (died 1640), Survey of Devon, 1811 edition, London, 1811, with 1810 Additions, p. 95
- Prince, John, (1643–1723) The Worthies of Devon, 1810 edition, London, pp. 281–284, biography of Davie, Edmund, Doctor of Physick (born 1630) (includes Davie ancestry)
