= Sandford, Devon =

Village in Devon, England

Coordinates: 50.810522°N 3.662816°W

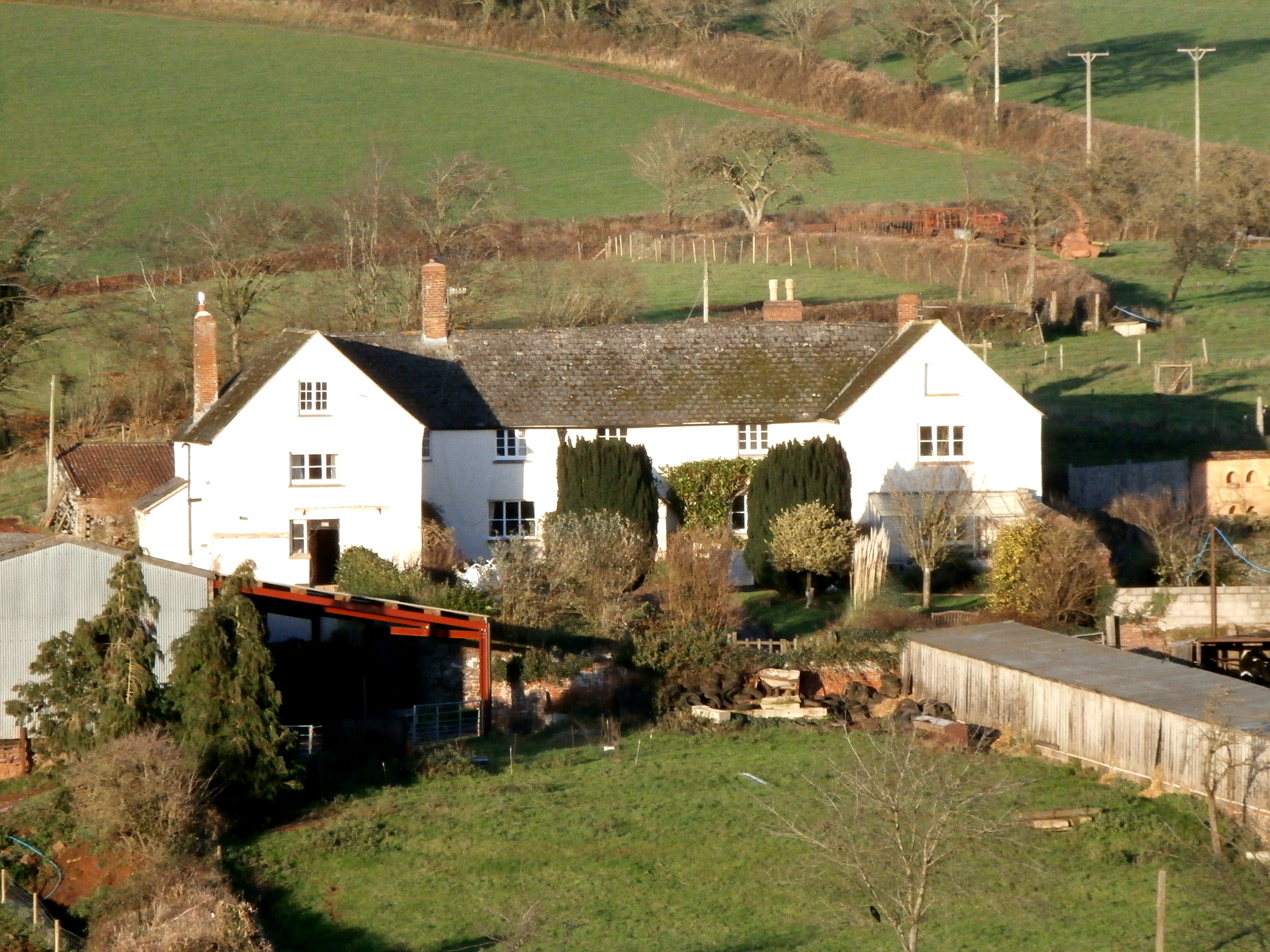
- Ruxford Barton, Sandford

- Location within Devon
- Population: 1,268 (2021 census)
- OS grid reference: SS828025
- District: Mid Devon
- Shire county: Devon
- Region: South West
- Country: England
- Sovereign state: United Kingdom
- Post town: Crediton
- Postcode district: EX17
- Dialling code: 01363
- Police: Devon and Cornwall
- Fire: Devon and Somerset
- Ambulance: South Western
- UK Parliament: Central Devon

Sandford is a village and civil parish in the Mid Devon district, within Devon, England. The parish, which includes the hamlets of East Village and Newbuildings, had a population of 1,268 at the 2021 census.

The village has its own community-owned shop and post office, two pubs, a Primary school, a church, St Swithuns with a font of Caen stone, and minor football and cricket teams.

It is linked by cycle/foot path to nearby Crediton through the Millennium Green – a wild flower meadow with herb garden, example of cob walling, and a large pond. An annual pumpkin growing competition is held there in late September.

The actors Luke and Harry Treadaway were raised in the village.

Near the village is Fordy Wood Copse a 0.64 hectares (1.58 acres) woodland owned and managed by the Woodland Trust.

== History ==
The Grade II listed school main building dates from 1825, and is notable for its classical Greek architecture and cob walls, thought to be the highest of their kind in the country.

The area surrounding the town of Crediton is particularly well populated with important historic estates. Those within the parish of Sandford include Dowrich, Creedy, Ruxford and West Sandford.

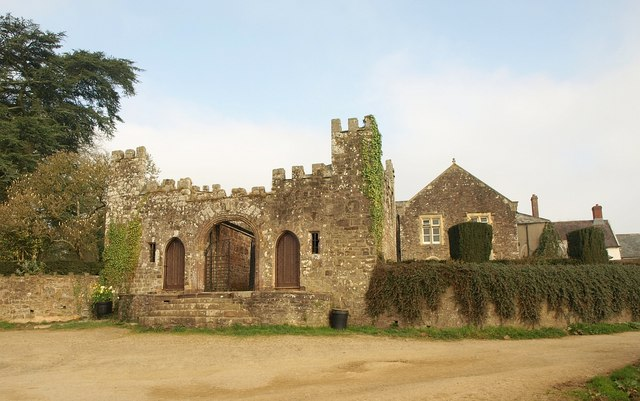
Dowrich, 15th century gatehouse, viewed in 2011

Dowrich (anciently Dowrish) was the seat of the ancient gentry family of Dowrish (originally de Dowrish) between the 12th century and 1717. The family built a castle keep on the site. A 15th century gatehouse survives there today, next to the ancient mansion house. An elaborate monumental brass survives in Sandford Church to the wife of Walter Dowrish, namely Mary Carew (1550–1604).

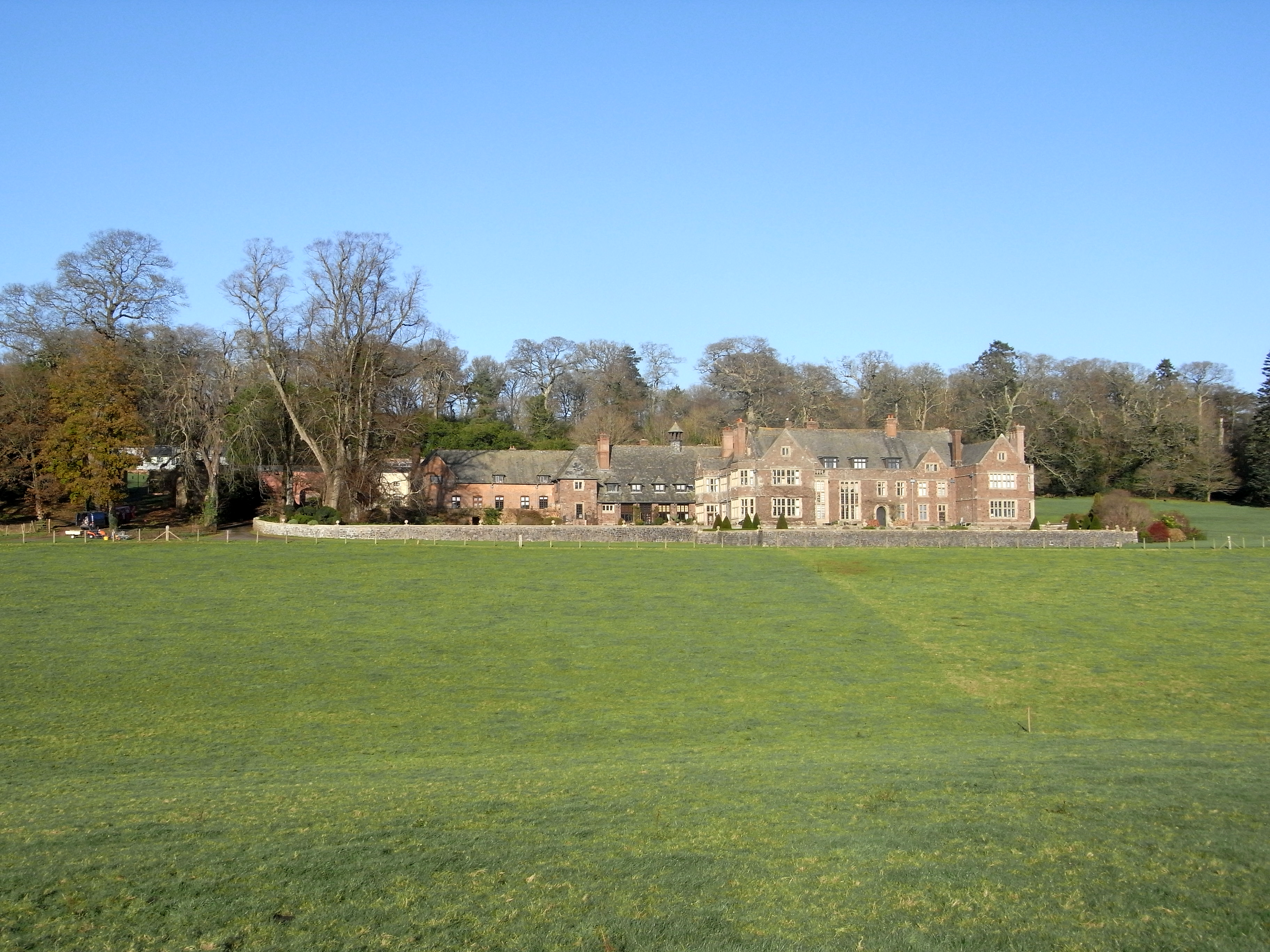
Creedy Park

Creedy Park was long the seat of the Davie Baronets and their heirs the Ferguson-Davie Baronets, influential in the life of the parish of Sandford, to many members of which family survive monuments in the parish church. Sandford School was built in 1825, in the form of a classical Greek temple, by Sir Humphrey Phineas Davie, 10th Baronet (1775–1846).

The estate of Ruxford is recorded in a charter dated 930 in which a large estate was granted to the canons of Crediton Church. The existing farmhouse known as Ruxford Barton was rebuilt in 1608 by the Chichester family, as is evidenced by a strapwork cartouche in plaster-work displaying the arms of that family with initials and date 1608. In 1618 Ruxford Barton was purchased from by Emmanuel Davie, a "clothier of Crediton". In about 1620 a plaster escutcheon was affixed inside the house showing the de Via arms of the Davie family impaled with the arms of Northcote, the arms of the family of his first wife Katherine Northcote (d.1620).

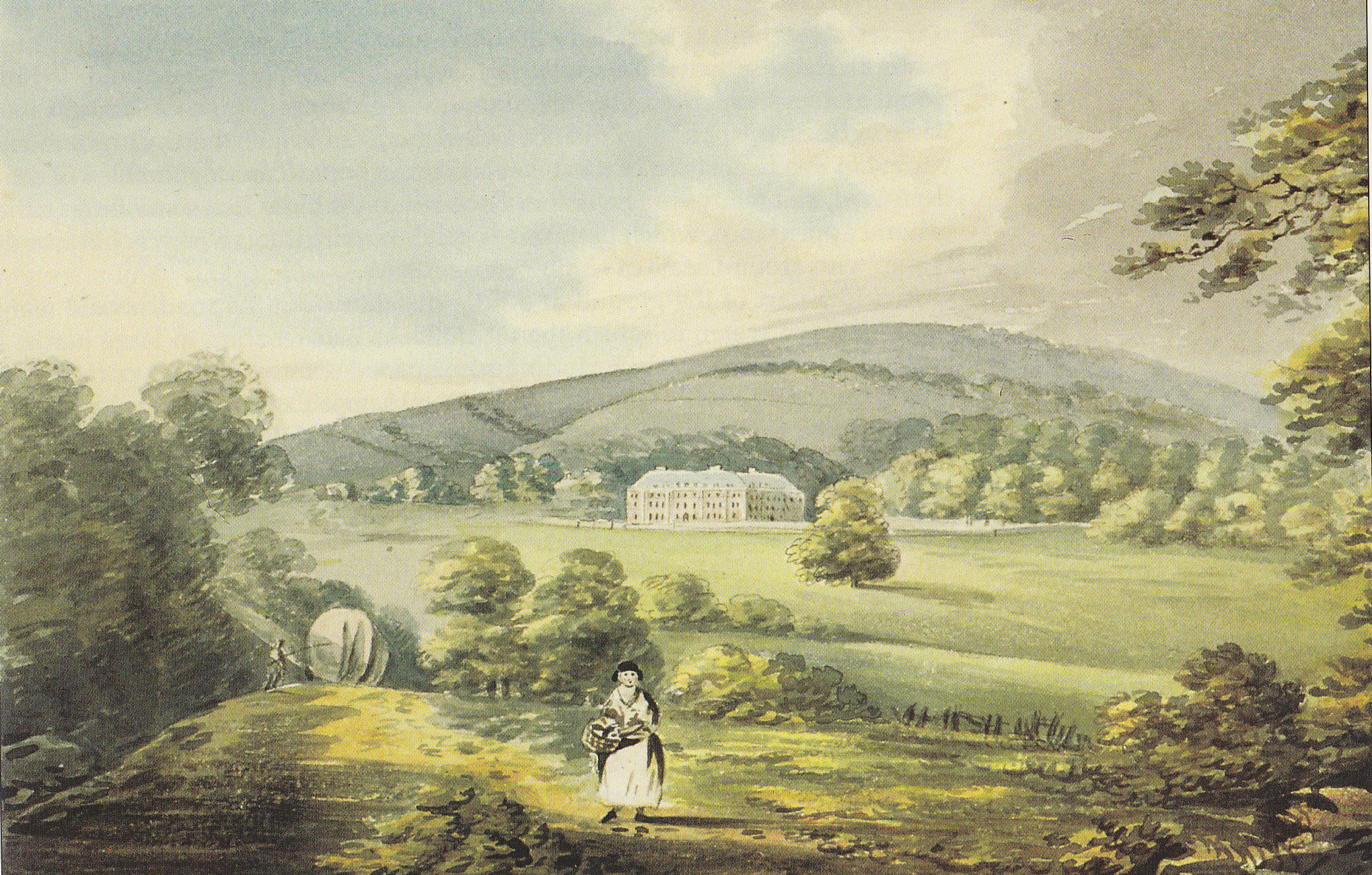
"Sandford, seat of Sir John Chichester, Bart.". Water-colour painting by John Swete, 1797. Devon Record Office, 564M/F11/118

West Sandford was a very large mansion about 2 1/2 miles north-west of Crediton, near the estate of Ruxford, of which a watercolour painting was made in 1797 by the Devon topographer John Swete. Swete wrote of West Sandford in his Travel Journal in 1797:

The appearance of this house, built with brick and decorated with white mouldings, is of great respectability. Its contiguous gardens with high walls and large gates and the groves that shelter it on the NE speak it to have been the residence of some person of consequence who had a relish for things of former days and was too advanced in years to adopt the improvements of modern taste. It was long the property and abode of Lady Chichester and by her decease a few years ago became a possession of Sir John Chichester of Youlston, Bart. Beheld in its two fronts from a rising point of the public road it had such extent of building as to possess a degree of magnificence; nor has it less to recommend itself for its situation, having spread out before its windows some of the richest pasture ground in the county. What ingredients of the picturesque, taking advantage of the road as a foreground, may enter into the composition of the scenery, may be collected from the following sketch.

Lady Chichester was Frances Quicke, daughter of Andrew Quicke (1666–1736) of Newton St. Cyres, to whose second husband, Sir John Chichester, 4th Baronet (1689–1740) of Youlston Park, the estate of West Sandford appears to have descended. The large house had already been demolished by 1822 as reported by Lysons, who stated the estate was then owned by John Quicke, Esq.

== Governance ==
Sandford Parish Council is the lowest form of local government that covers this rural parish.

For elections to Mid Devon District Council, Sandford is in the electoral ward named Sandford and Creedy.

For elections to Devon County Council, it is in Creedy, Taw and Mid Exe electoral division.

== Demographics ==
Census population of Sandford, Devon parish
Census	Population	Female	Male	Households	Source
2001	1,346	676	670	519	
2011	1,391	711	680	537	
2021	1,268	647	621	547	
