= Slipton =

Village in Northamptonshire, England

Coordinates: 52.4035°N 0.6038°W

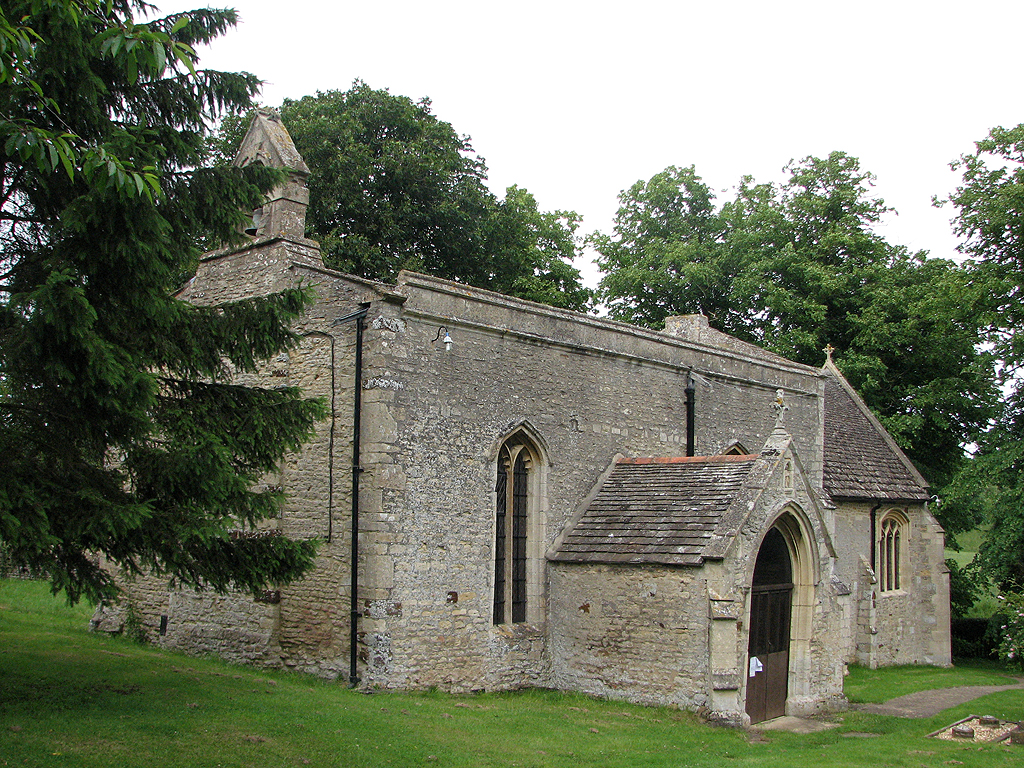
- St John the Baptist Church, Slipton

- Location within Northamptonshire
- OS grid reference: SP950793
- Civil parish: Lowick
- Unitary authority: North Northamptonshire
- Ceremonial county: Northamptonshire
- Region: East Midlands
- Country: England
- Sovereign state: United Kingdom
- Post town: Kettering
- Postcode district: NN14
- Dialling code: 01832
- Police: Northamptonshire
- Fire: Northamptonshire
- Ambulance: East Midlands
- UK Parliament: Corby and East Northamptonshire

Slipton is a village in the civil parish of Lowick, in the North Northamptonshire district, in the ceremonial county of Northamptonshire, England. Slipton has a small but exquisite church, St John The Baptist, a short walk from Main Street by footpath on the east side of the village. The church is what makes Slipton a village rather than a hamlet as it is often mistaken for. In 1931 the parish had a population of 80.

== History ==
The name Slipton derives from two Old English words meaning probably "muddy farm." Slipton was mentioned in the Domesday Book. It was a small village of only six freemen. The freehold was held by the Abbot of Peterborough. By the reign of King Henry I of England, the land had been divided. William de Courcy held a hide in it whilst Richard FitzHugh held two-thirds of a hide with the nephew of the Abbot owning the remaining third. By 1235, the Knights Hospitaller owned part of the village. All the land eventually ended up in the hands of Walter de Drayton who merged it into the Drayton, Northamptonshire estate.

Iron Ore was obtained in the area around the village between 1877 and 1932. There were both quarries and mines. The quarries began in 1877 south east of the village. The quarries worked their way up the east side of the village to the north end, finishing in 1914, with some quarried in 1932. There was also a limestone quarry near Slipton Lodge, to the north of the iron ore quarries. This operated between 1912 and 1930. Two small areas were quarried on the west side of the Sudborough to Slipton road between 1894 and 1912. All of these quarries were in the valley. On the east and west sides of the valley the ore was buried under a deeper overburden and ore was obtained by mining. On the east side a mine was operated between 1902 and 1915. It closed because of serious accidents and roof collapses which threatened to cause the collapse of two cottages. Two further mines were opened up on the west side of the Sudborough Road later in 1902. They were later joined up underground. All three mines were entered through adits driven into quarry faces and production ceased in 1936. The ore and limestone were taken by a three-foot gauge tramway operated by steam locomotives to be used in the iron works at Islip.. In the first mine the tramway was extended into the adit using horse haulage and manhandling but the gauge was found to be too wide and the tramway inside the mine was very soon narrowed to two-foot six gauge. The same gauge was used in the other two mines from the start. Horse haulage continued, although a small diesel locomotive was also used from 1933. The ore had to be tipped from the mine wagons into three-foot gauge wagons just outside the mine. Ore and stone was gained by hand with the aid of explosives for the most part but steam quarrying machines were used from the 1920s and compressed air drills and picks were tried in one of the mines in 1932. As at 1977 and 1988 there were visible traces of the quarries, mines and tramway. These included mine entrances (two bricked up) and some collapsed pieces of the adits.

On 1 April 1935 the parish was abolished and merged with Lowick.

=== Church ===
The church dedicated to Saint John the Baptist was constructed in the 13th century though was rebuilt in the 14th century. The rights of advowson for the church was probably held by Simon of the Curcy family who gave the rights to Cirencester Abbey. Due to a dispute, in 1291, the Abbey surrendered their rights of advowson to the Hospital of St John in Northampton in exchange for a yearly pension of 10 shillings. When the hospital was dissolved, its rights were given to Francis Morgan who gave it to John Mordaunt, 1st Baron Mordaunt. The rights were in 1640 transferred by the then owner to John, Earl of Peterborough (a later member of the Mordaunt family) as part of a payment for afforestation at the Forest of Rockingham.
