= Henry Mordaunt =

Henry Mordaunt may refer to:

- Henry Mordaunt, 4th Baron Mordaunt (died 1608), English landowner involved in the Gunpowder Plot
- Henry Mordaunt, 2nd Earl of Peterborough (1621–1697), English soldier, peer and courtier
- Henry Mordaunt (Royal Navy officer) (c. 1682–1710), English politician and naval officer
- Sir Henry Mordaunt, 12th Baronet (1867–1939), English baronet and cricketer
