= Earl of Peterborough =

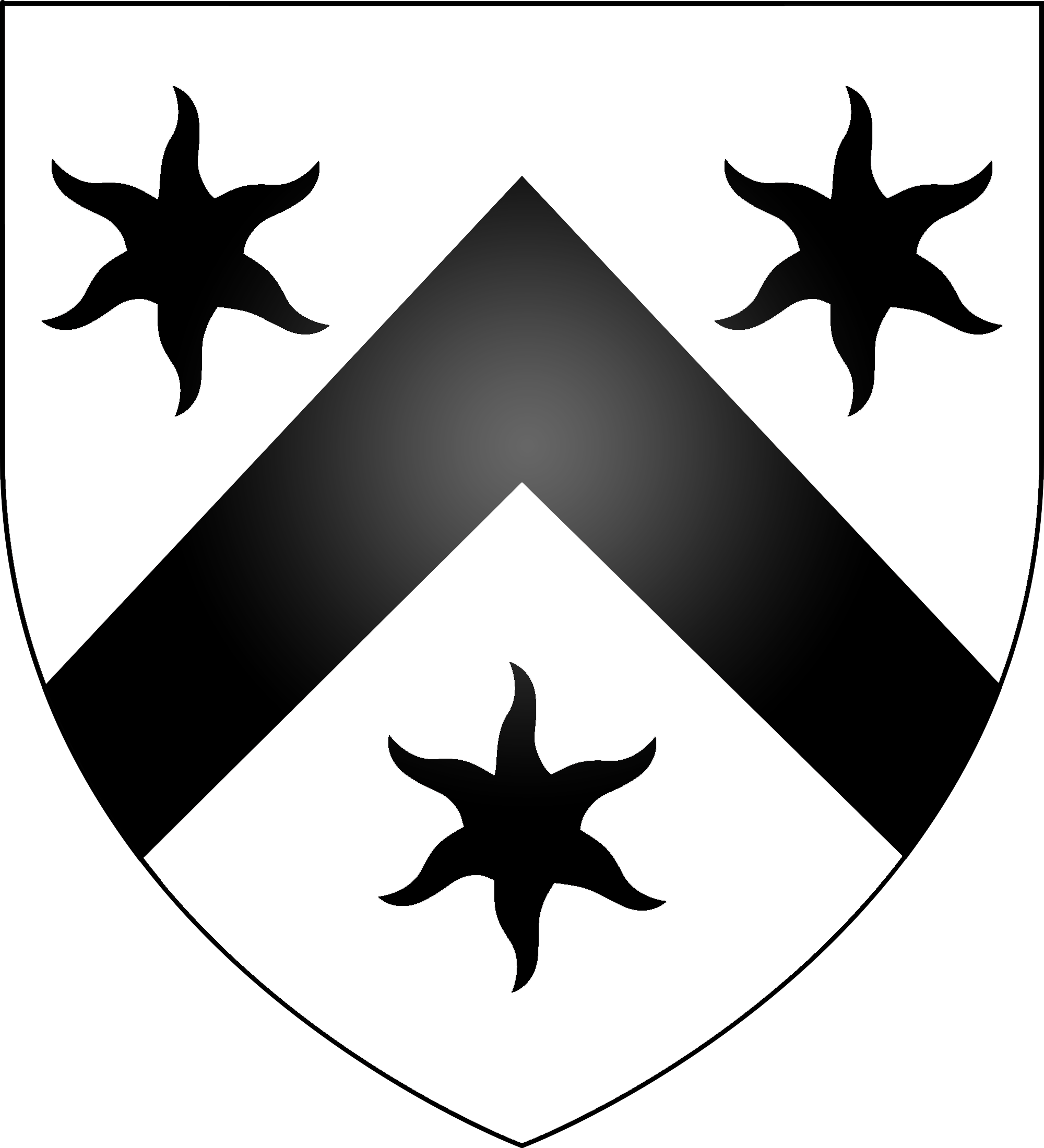
Arms of Mordaunt: Argent, a chevron between three estoiles sable

Earl of Peterborough was a title in the Peerage of England. It was created in 1628 for John Mordaunt, 5th Baron Mordaunt (see Baron Mordaunt for earlier history of the family). He was succeeded by his eldest son, Henry, the second Earl. He was a soldier and courtier. Lord Peterborough had two daughters but no sons. He was succeeded in the barony of Mordaunt (which could be passed through female lines) by his daughter, Mary, 7th Baroness. The earldom was passed on to his nephew, Charles Mordaunt, 1st Earl of Monmouth (see below for an earlier history of this branch of the family), who became the third Earl. He was a prominent soldier and politician. In 1705 he also succeeded his cousin Mary in the barony of Mordaunt. His eldest son John Mordaunt, Viscount Mordaunt, predeceased him, and Lord Peterborough was consequently succeeded by his grandson, Charles, the fourth Earl (the eldest son of Viscount Mordaunt). The barony of Mordaunt (of the 1659 creation), the viscountcy of Mordaunt and the earldoms of Peterborough and Monmouth, became extinct on the death of the latter's son, the fifth Earl, in 1814. The barony of Mordaunt was passed on to his half-sister, Lady Mary Anastasia Grace Mordaunt (see Baron Mordaunt for further history of this title).

The Honourable John Mordaunt, second son of the first Earl of Peterborough, fought as a Royalist during the Civil War. In 1659 he was raised to the Peerage of England as Baron Mordaunt, of Ryegate in the County of Surrey, and Viscount Mordaunt, of Avalon in the County of Somerset. Lord Mordaunt married Elizabeth, daughter of the Honourable Thomas Carey, younger son of Robert Carey, 1st Earl of Monmouth. He was succeeded by his eldest son, the aforementioned Charles, the second Viscount. In 1689 he was created Earl of Monmouth in the Peerage of England, a revival of the earldom which had become extinct on the death of his great-uncle, Henry Carey, 2nd Earl of Monmouth, in 1661. In 1697 Lord Monmouth also succeeded his uncle in the earldom of Peterborough. See above for further history of the titles.

Several other members of the Mordaunt family may also be mentioned. The Honourable Henry Mordaunt (d. 1710), second son of the third Earl, was a captain in the Royal Navy. The Honourable John Mordaunt, second son of John Mordaunt, Viscount Mordaunt, was a politician and soldier. The Honourable Harry Mordaunt, younger son of the first Viscount Mordaunt, was a soldier and politician. His son Sir John Mordaunt was also a prominent soldier and politician.

== Earls of Peterborough (1628) ==
- John Mordaunt, 1st Earl of Peterborough (1600–1643)
- Henry Mordaunt, 2nd Earl of Peterborough (1621–1697)
- Charles Mordaunt, 3rd Earl of Peterborough, 1st Earl of Monmouth (1658–1735)
  - John Mordaunt, Viscount Mordaunt (c. 1681–1710)
- Charles Mordaunt, 4th Earl of Peterborough, 2nd Earl of Monmouth (1708–1779)
- Charles Henry Mordaunt, 5th Earl of Peterborough, 3rd Earl of Monmouth (1758–1814)

== Viscounts Mordaunt (1659) ==
- John Mordaunt, 1st Viscount Mordaunt (1626–1675)
- Charles Mordaunt, 2nd Viscount Mordaunt (1658–1735) (created Earl of Monmouth in 1689)

== Earls of Monmouth (1689) ==
- Charles Mordaunt, 1st Earl of Monmouth (1658–1735) (succeeded as Earl of Peterborough in 1697)

== See also ==
- Baron Mordaunt
- Earl of Monmouth
