= Baron Mordaunt =

The title Baron Mordaunt was created in 1529 for Sir John Mordaunt. The fifth baron was created Earl of Peterborough in 1628 and the title then passed to his son, the second earl, in 1644. On his death in 1697, the earldom was inherited by his nephew, Charles and the barony was inherited by his only child, Mary, the estranged wife of the 7th Duke of Norfolk. When she died childless in 1705, the barony was also inherited by Charles, who had also been created Earl of Monmouth.

On the death of the 5th Earl of Peterborough in 1814, the title passed to his elder half-sister, Mary. When she died childless in 1819, the title then passed to the 4th Duke of Gordon, who was a maternal great-grandson of the 3rd Earl of Peterborough. The title was then inherited by the 5th Duke of Gordon in 1827 and when he died without legitimate issue in 1836, the title became abeyant between his sisters (Charlotte Lennox, Duchess of Richmond; Susan Montagu, Duchess of Manchester; Georgiana Russell, Duchess of Bedford; Louisa Cornwallis, Marchioness Cornwallis; and Lady Madeline Palmer) and their issue.

== Barons Mordaunt (1529) ==
- John Mordaunt, 1st Baron Mordaunt (d. 1562)
- John Mordaunt, 2nd Baron Mordaunt (1508–1571)
- Lewis Mordaunt, 3rd Baron Mordaunt (1538–1601)
- Henry Mordaunt, 4th Baron Mordaunt (c. 1567–1609)
- John Mordaunt, 1st Earl of Peterborough, 5th Baron Mordaunt (1599–1644)
- Henry Mordaunt, 2nd Earl of Peterborough, 6th Baron Mordaunt (1621–1697)
- Mary Howard, 7th Baroness Mordaunt, Duchess of Norfolk (c. 1659–1705)
- Charles Mordaunt, 3rd Earl of Peterborough, 1st Earl of Monmouth, 8th Baron Mordaunt (c. 1658–1735)
- Charles Mordaunt, 4th Earl of Peterborough, 2nd Earl of Monmouth, 9th Baron Mordaunt (1708–1779)
- Charles Mordaunt, 5th Earl of Peterborough, 3rd Earl of Monmouth, 10th Baron Mordaunt (1758–1814)
- Mary Mordaunt, 11th Baroness Mordaunt (1738–1819)
- Alexander Gordon, 4th Duke of Gordon, 12th Baron Mordaunt (1743–1827)
- George Gordon, 5th Duke of Gordon, 13th Baron Mordaunt (1770–1836) (abeyant)

== Co-heirs as of 2026 ==
- From the line of Charlotte Lennox, Duchess of Richmond;
  - 1/5: Charles Gordon-Lennox, 11th Duke of Richmond
- From the line of Lady Madeline Palmer;
  - 1/10: Andrew Westmacott (1/2 of the share of his grandmother, Edith Anderson-Pelham, only child of Madalina Sinclair, heiress general to Lady Madeline)
  - 1/10: James O’Reilly (1/2 of the share of his great-grandmother, Edith Anderson-Pelham, only child of Madalina Sinclair, heiress general to Lady Madeline)
- From the line of Louisa Cornwallis, Marchioness Cornwallis;
  - 1/15: Patrick Stopford, 9th Earl of Courtown (direct descendant of the Hon. Catherine Neville, only child of the Richard Neville, 4th Baron Braybrooke, whose mother was born Lady Jane Cornwallis)
  - 1/60: Frederica Cope, granddaughter of Lady Rosemary Eliot, daughter of John Eliot, 6th Earl of St Germans, who was a grandson of Lady Jemima Cornwallis
  - 1/60: Alexandra Rubens, granddaughter of the 6th Earl of St Germans, who was a grandson of Lady Jemima Cornwallis
  - 1/30: David Seyfried-Herbert, 19th Baron Herbert, son of Lady Cathleen Eliot, daughter of the 6th Earl of St Germans
  - 1/15: Sir Philip Trousdell KBE, whose grandmother, Ellen Whatman Trousdell, was the granddaughter of Lady Mary Cornwallis Ross
- From the line of Susan Montagu, Duchess of Manchester;
  - 1/5: Alexander Montagu, 13th Duke of Manchester
- From the line of Georgiana Russell, Duchess of Bedford;
  - 1/5: Alexander Russell, son of Sir John Wriothesley Russell by Aliki Diplarakou and grandson of Sir Thomas Wentworth Russell, who was in turn the grandson of Lord Charles Russell, fourth son of Georgiana Russell, Duchess of Bedford
