= Charles Mordaunt, 3rd Earl of Peterborough =

British army officer and politician

The Right Honourable The Earl of Peterborough KG PC
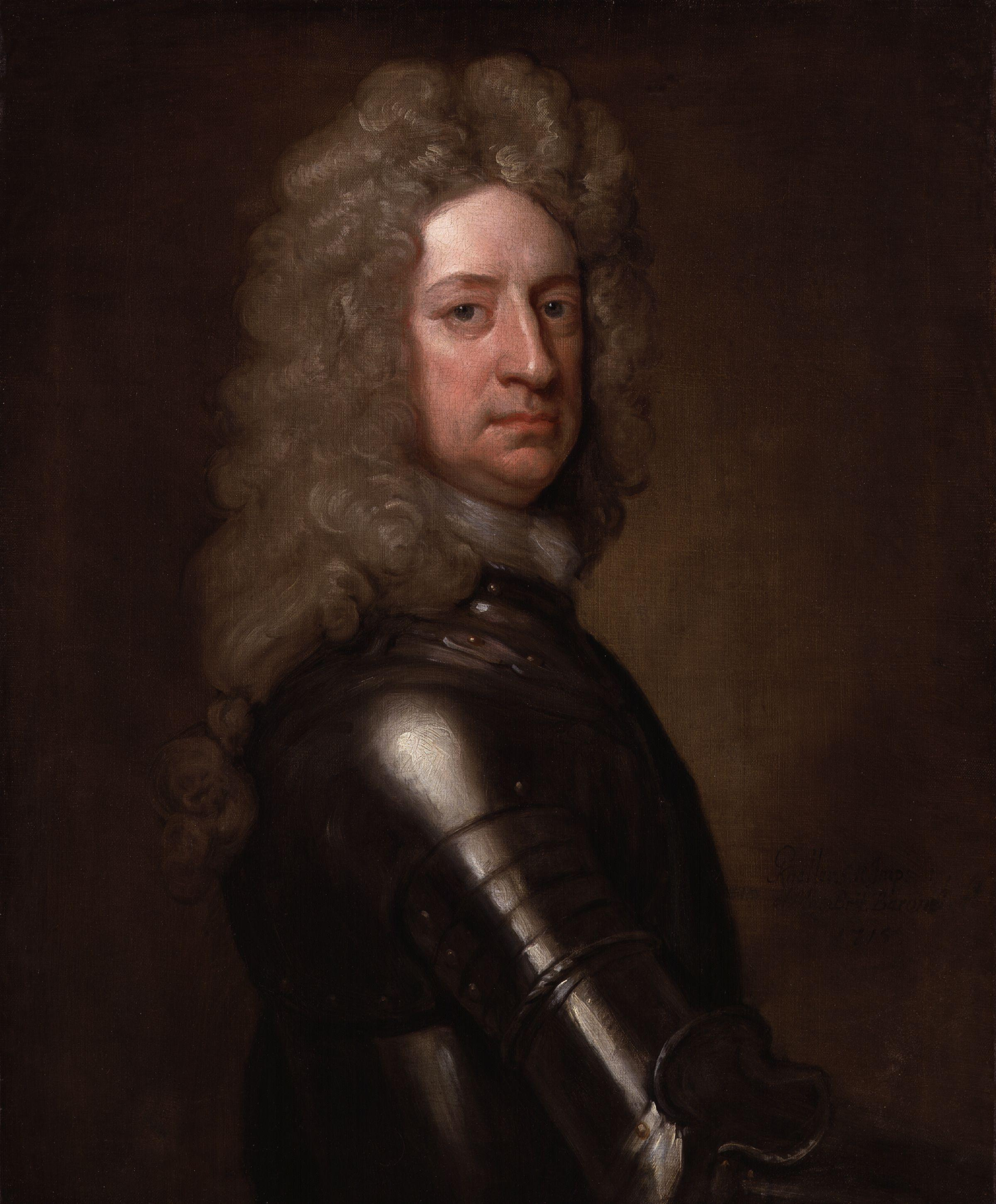
- Portrait by Sir Godfrey Kneller, 1715

Senior Privy Counsellor
- In office 1730–1735

First Lord of the Treasury
- In office 1689–1690

Personal details
- Born: 1658
- Died: 25 October 1735 (aged 76–77) Lisbon, Portugal
- Party: Tory (c. 1708); Whig (before c. 1708)
- Spouse(s): Carey Fraser (m. 1678; died 1709) Anastasia Robinson (m. ~1722)
- Children: 3, including John
- Parents: John Mordaunt (father); Elizabeth Carey (mother)
- Relatives: John Mordaunt (grandfather); Thomas Carey (grandfather); Henry Mordaunt (uncle)
- Education: Christ Church, Oxford
- Military career
- Service: British Army
- Wars: War of the Spanish Succession

Charles Mordaunt, 3rd Earl of Peterborough, KG, PC (1658 – 25 October 1735) was a British army officer and Whig politician. He was the son of John Mordaunt, 1st Viscount Mordaunt, and his wife Elizabeth, the daughter and sole heiress of Thomas Carey, the second son of Robert Carey, 1st Earl of Monmouth. Mordaunt's father, John Mordaunt, was created Viscount Mordaunt of Avalon and Baron Mordaunt of Reigate, Surrey, in 1659.

== Political career ==
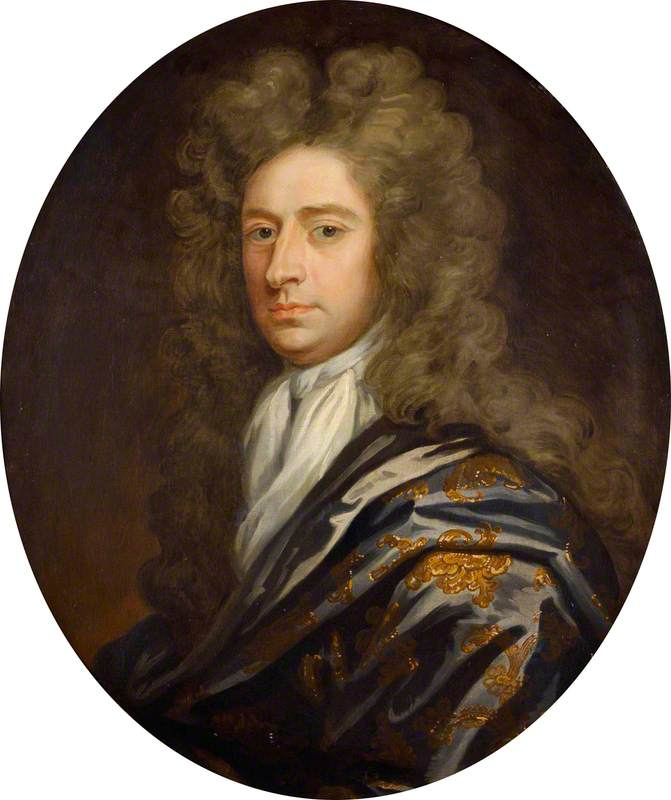
Charles Mordaunt succeeded to the peerage as Viscount Mordaunt in 1675.

Charles attended Tonbridge School before matriculating at Christ Church, Oxford, on 11 April 1674. When about sixteen years of age he joined Sir John Narborough's fleet in the Mediterranean, and won his first distinction in arms in the destruction of the dey's fleet under the guns of Tripoli. His father died on 5 June 1675, and Charles Mordaunt succeeded to the peerage as Viscount Mordaunt.

On his return from the second expedition to Tangier, he plunged into active political life as a zealous Whig and an unswerving opponent of the heir to the throne James, Duke of York. When James succeeded to the throne, Mordaunt's continued hostility forced him to repair to Holland in 1686, when he proposed to William of Orange to invade England. The disposition of the cold and cautious William had little in common with the fierce and turbulent Mordaunt. His plan was rejected, though the prudent prince of Orange deemed it judicious to retain his services. When William sailed to Torbay, his friend accompanied him, and when the Dutch prince was safely established on the throne of England, honours without stint were showered upon Lord Mordaunt.

=== First Lord of the Treasury ===
He was sworn to the privy council on 14 February 1689, on 8 April of the same year appointed First Lord of the Treasury, and a day later advanced in the peerage by creation as 1st Earl of Monmouth (second creation within the same family line). His maternal grandparents were Thomas Carey and his wife Margaret Smith; Thomas was the second son of Robert Carey, 1st Earl of Monmouth and his wife Elizabeth Trevanion. The Monmouth creation thus returned the earldom to the descendant of an earlier holder. (Note: Created 1626, this peerage became extinct in 1661 on the death of the 2nd Earl; it may have been also created to obliterate the memory of James Scott the Duke of Monmouth who was beheaded for treason.)

In less than a year, he was out of the treasury, but he still remained by the person of his monarch and was with him in his dangerous passage to Holland in January 1691. He was one of the eighteen peers who signed the protest against the rejection, on 7 December 1692, of the motion for the appointment of a committee to inquire into the conduct of the war, and although William had refused his consent to a bill for triennial parliaments in the previous session, Lord Monmouth did not shrink from reintroducing it in December 1693. This led to a disagreement with the court, though the final breach did not take place until January 1697, when Monmouth was accused of complicity in Sir John Fenwick's conspiracy and of the use of undutiful words towards the king. He was committed to the Tower of London, staying in confinement until 30 March 1697, and deprived of his employments. Some consolation for these troubles came to him on 19 June of the same year, when he succeeded to the Earldom of Peterborough, by the death of his uncle Henry Mordaunt, 2nd Earl.

=== Release from the Tower ===
The four years after his release from the Tower were mainly passed in retirement, but on the accession of Queen Anne, he plunged into political life again with avidity. His first act was to draw down on himself in February 1702 the censure of the House of Commons for the part which he took in the attempt to secure the return of his nominee for the borough of Malmesbury. Through the fear of the ministry that his restless spirit would drive him into opposition to its measures if he stayed at home, he was appointed early in 1705 to command an expedition to Spain, during the War of the Spanish Succession.

=== Sole commander of land forces ===
He led English and Dutch troops in Spain. He was created the sole commander of the land forces in April 1705 and joint commander with Sir Cloudesley Shovell of the fleet on 1 May, after he had been reinstated a member of the privy council on 29 March. He arrived at Lisbon on 20 June 1705, sailed for Barcelona that August on an expedition for the conquest of Catalonia, and began to besiege the city. For some weeks, the operations were not prosecuted with vigour and Peterborough urged that the fleet should transport the troops to Italy, but the energetic counsels of the Archduke Charles of Austria at last prevailed and by 14 October the city fell into his hands.

According to the Encyclopedia Britannica 1911:

"It is difficult to understand the action of Peterborough during this campaign, unless on the supposition that he was out of sympathy with the movement for placing an Austrian prince on the throne of Spain. When Charles determined upon uniting with Lord Galway's troops and marching to Madrid, the advice of Peterborough again hindered his progress. At first, he urged an advance by Valencia as supplies had there been collected, then he withdrew this statement; afterwards, he delayed for some weeks to join Galway, who was in need of succour, but ultimately reached the camp on 6 August.

=== Return to England ===
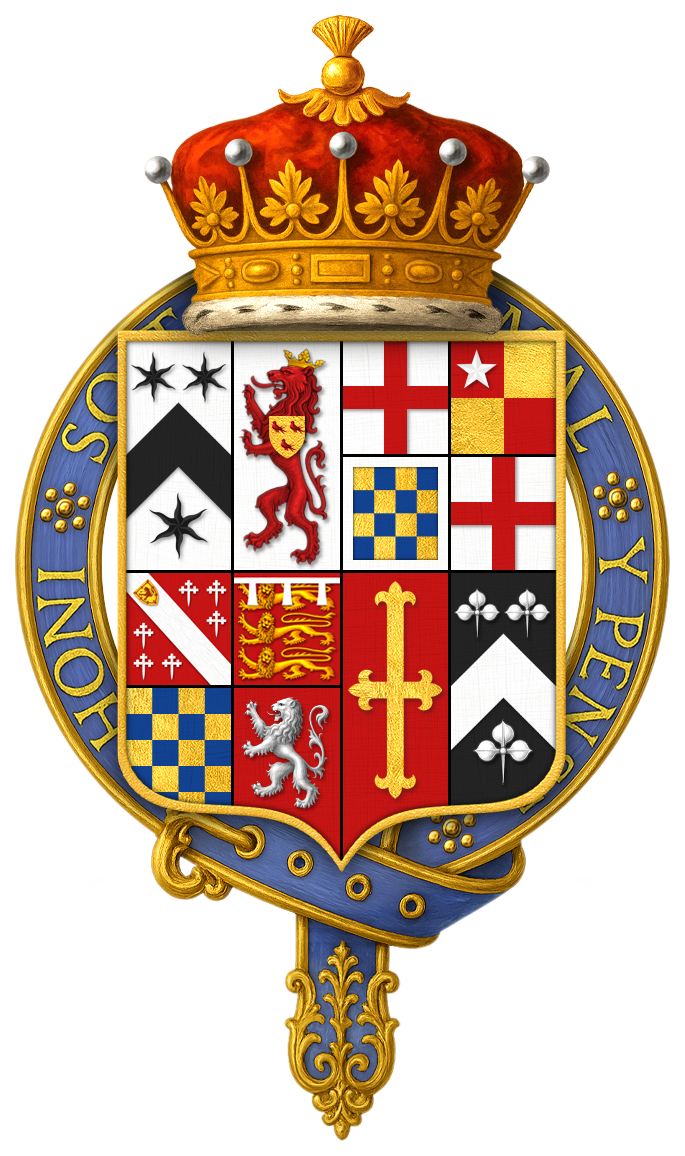
Quartered arms of Charles Mordaunt, 3rd Earl of Peterborough, KG, PC

On his return to England, he allied himself with the Tories, and received his reward in being contrasted, much to his advantage, with the Whig victor of Blenheim and Malplaquet. The differences between the three peers, Peterborough, Galway and Tyrawley, who had served in Spain, formed the subject of angry debates in the House of Lords, when the majority declared for Peterborough; after some fiery speeches the resolution that he had performed many great and eminent services was carried, and votes of thanks were passed to him without any division in early 1708.

His new friends were not desirous of detaining him long on English soil, and they sent him on a mission to Vienna, where he characteristically engaged the ministry in pledges of which they disapproved. His resentment at this disagreement was softened by the command of a cavalry regiment, and by his appointment as a Knight of the Garter in 1713. With the accession of George I, Lord Peterborough's influence was gone. Worn out with suffering, he died in Lisbon on 25 October 1735. His remains were brought to England, and buried at Turvey in Bedfordshire on 21 November.

== Character and family ==
Lord Peterborough was short in stature and spare in habit of body. His activity knew no bounds. He was said to have seen more kings and postilions than any man in Europe, and the whole point of Jonathan Swift's lines on Mordanto consisted in a description of the speed with which he hastened from capital to capital. He was eloquent in debate and intrepid in war, but his influence in the senate was ruined through his inconsistency, and his vigour in the field was wasted through his want of union with his colleagues.

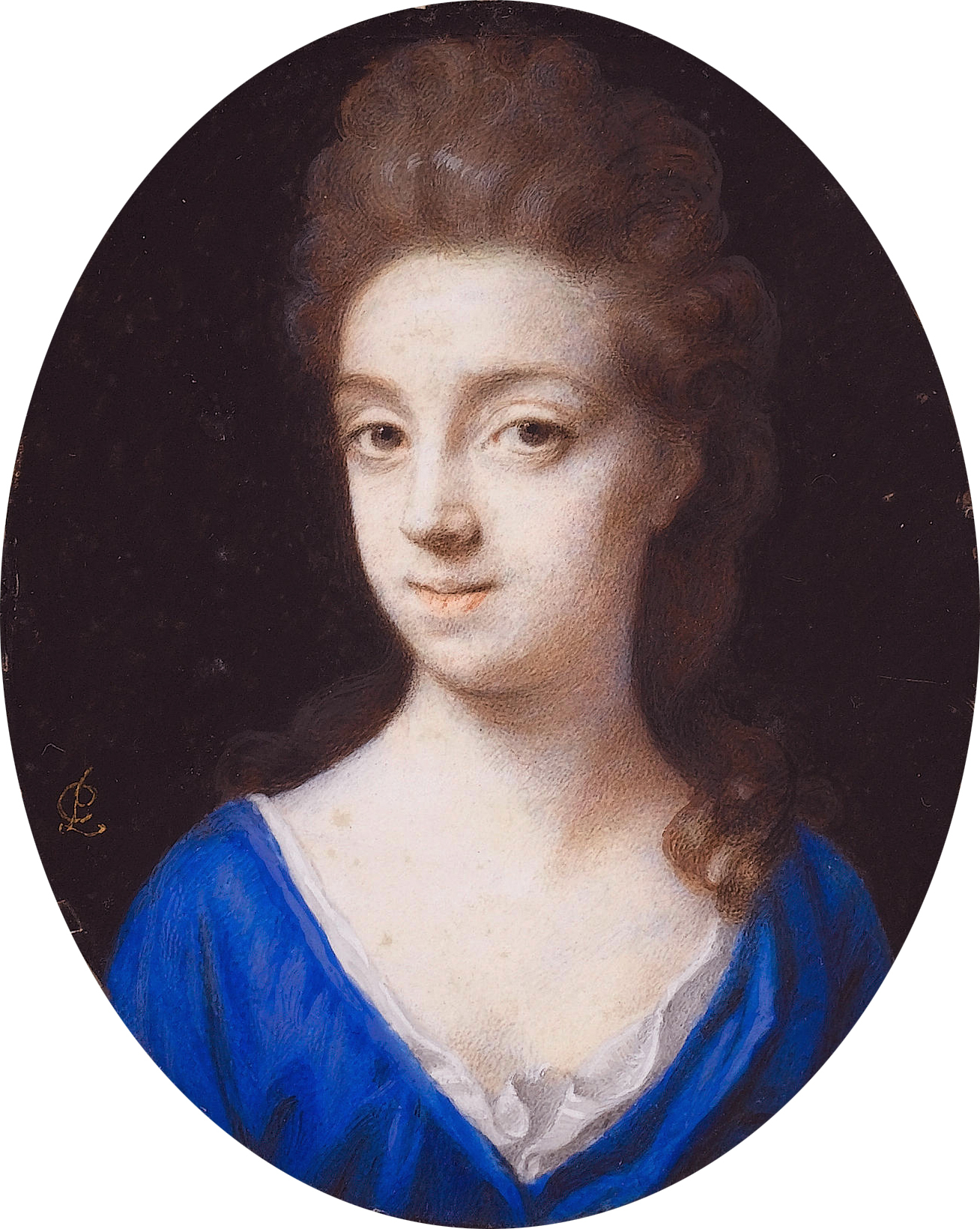
Carey Fraser (Peter Cross)

In 1678 Charles married Carey Fraser, daughter of Sir Alexander Fraser and his wife, Mary Carey (a second cousin of Mordaunt's mother, Elizabeth Carey – making Carey Fraser a third cousin to him). She died on 13 May 1709 and was buried at Turvey. They had three children:

- Lady Henrietta Mordaunt (died 1760), married the 2nd Duke of Gordon and had issue. Her grandson the 4th Duke eventually inherited the Mordaunt barony.
- John Mordaunt, Viscount Mordaunt (c.1681–1710), ancestor of the 4th Earl.
- Capt. Hon. Henry Mordaunt, RN (died 27 February 1710).

In 1722 (Note: The date of this marriage is disputed. Rogers discusses the discrepancies in his 2004 article Archived 5 March 2012 at the Wayback Machine. An article from The New York Times (1890) says that the marriage took place in 1714 and Lady Oxford was a witness. The marriage went unrecognized by Lord Peterborough although he accompanied her to and from the opera. She remained prima donna from 1714 to 1722, having joined the opera in 1712 due to her family's poverty when her father's eyesight began to fail. Despite Anastasia's retirement from the stage in 1722 owing to advanced made to her in her equivocal position, her husband still refused to acknowledge her. She lived with her mother in Fulham.) he secretly married Anastasia Robinson (ca. 1695–1755), a famous dramatic singer (from 1714) of great beauty and sweetness of disposition, daughter of Thomas Robinson (died 1722), a portrait painter; but she was at first unrecognised as his wife, and lived apart from him (regarded merely as his mistress) with her two sisters at Parson's Green. She remained on the operatic stage until 1724.

A second marriage ceremony appears to have taken place a few months before his death in 1735. By his second wife, he appears to have had no issue. According to the Encyclopædia Britannica (1911), it was only a few months before his death that Anastasia died; however, this is flatly contradicted by the evidence that Anastasia, Countess of Peterborough and Monmouth, survived until 1755 and that the purported second marriage ceremony never took place in 1735. (Note: Rogers (2004) points out that Charles Burney's General History of Music (1789), based on information supplied by Mary Delany is the main source of information for subsequent biographies; however, recent research using letters by Alexander Pope (who knew both Peterborough and Mordaunt) may contradict these long-held beliefs.)

== See also ==
- Mordaunt Cracherode
- William Chaloner
- HMS Mordaunt

== Citations ==
Political offices
Preceded by The Lord Belasyse	First Lord of the Treasury; 1689–1690	Succeeded by Sir John Lowther
Military offices
New regiment	Colonel of Lord Peterborough's Regiment of Dragoons; 1706–1707	Succeeded by Frans van Nassau
Preceded by The Earl Rivers	Colonel of the Royal Horse Guards; 1712–1715	Succeeded by The Duke of Argyll
Honorary titles
Preceded by The Earl of Peterborough	Lord Lieutenant of Northamptonshire; 1689–1715	Succeeded by The Duke of Montagu
Preceded by The Earl of Cardigan	Custos Rotulorum of Northamptonshire; 1714–1715	Succeeded by The Earl of Westmorland
Preceded by The Earl of Winchilsea and Nottingham	Senior Privy Counsellor; 1730–1735	Succeeded by The Earl of Carlisle
Peerage of England
Preceded by Henry Mordaunt	Earl of Peterborough; 1697–1735	Succeeded by Charles Mordaunt
New creation	Earl of Monmouth; 1689–1735	Succeeded by Charles Mordaunt
Preceded by John Mordaunt	Viscount Mordaunt; 1675–1735	Succeeded by Charles Mordaunt
Preceded by Mary Howard	Baron Mordaunt; 1705–1735	Succeeded by Charles Mordaunt
