= Henry Mordaunt, 4th Baron Mordaunt =

English landowner

- Born: 1568
- Died: 1610 (aged 41–42)
- Spouse: Margaret Compton
- Children: 2+, including John
- Father: Lewis Mordaunt

Henry Mordaunt, 4th Baron Mordaunt (1568–1610) was an English landowner involved in the Gunpowder Plot.

== Biography ==
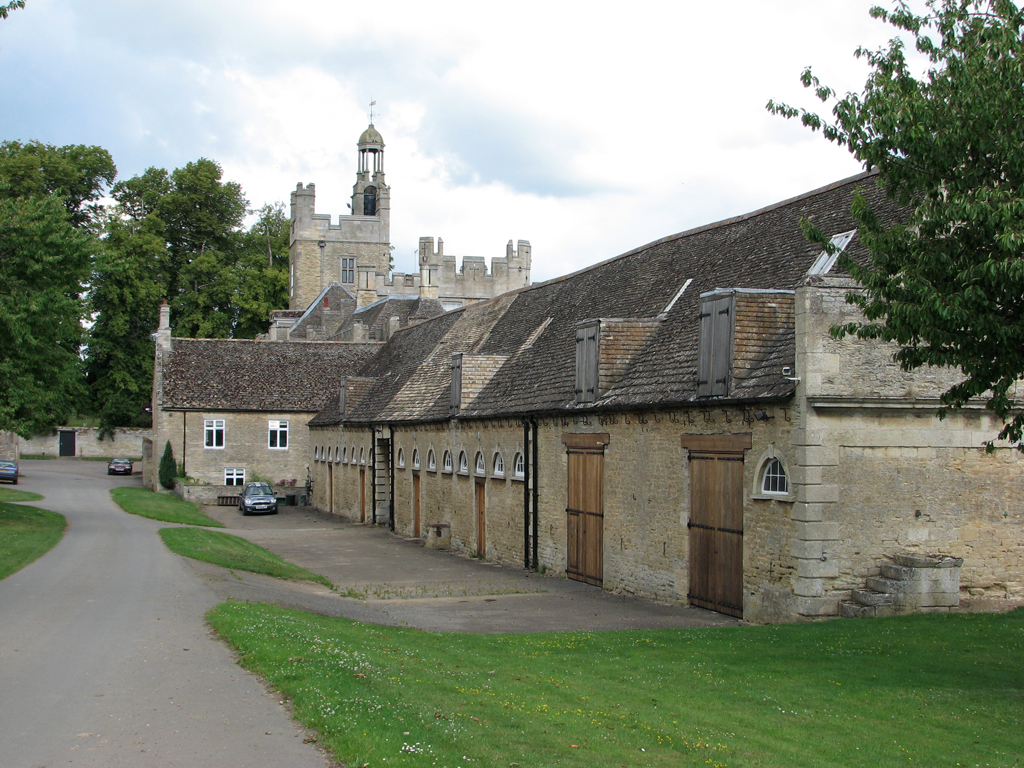
Drayton House and stables

He was the son of Lewis Mordaunt, 3rd Baron Mordaunt and Elizabeth Darcy. The family house was Drayton House.

Mordaunt was at Apethorpe with a welcoming party for James VI and I in April 1603. While he was there he discussed plans to cut timber in Brigstock park. There were riots at Brigstock in May and Mordaunt went to read a royal proclamation to restore order. Francis Tresham, later a Gunpowder Plot conspirator, was involved in the controversy at Brigstock.

Henry Mordaunt entertained King James and Anne of Denmark at his house at Drayton, Northamptonshire, with musicians and singers in August 1605. The queen's secretary, William Fowler, was also present. Later there were rumours that there had been a plot to kill King James at Drayton during this visit during a masque entertainment. Two Gunpowder Plot conspirators Ambrose Rookwood and Thomas Winter had been at Drayton on the day before King James arrived.

Mordaunt was imprisoned in the Tower of London on suspicion of complicity in the Gunpowder Plot, for his correspondence with Everard Digby. He was released on 3 June 1606.

He died in 1610.

== Marriage and family ==
He married Margaret Compton, a daughter of Henry Compton, 1st Baron Compton. Their children included:

- John Mordaunt, 1st Earl of Peterborough

Peerage of England
Preceded by Lewis Mordaunt	Baron Mordaunt; 1601–1608	Succeeded by John Mordaunt
