= John Mordaunt, 1st Viscount Mordaunt =

English peer

The Right Honourable The Viscount Mordaunt
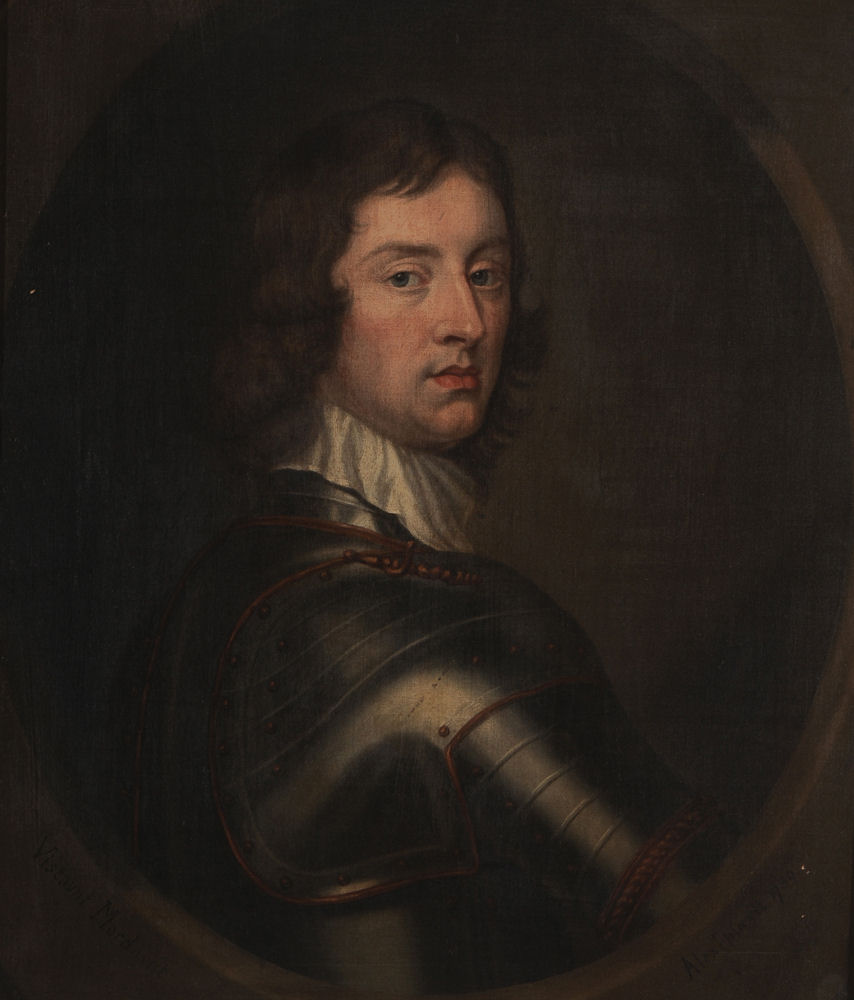
- Portrait by John Alexander, 1739
- Born: 18 June 1627; Lowick, Northamptonshire
- Died: 5 June 1675 (aged 47); Parson's Green, Middlesex
- Spouse: Elizabeth Carey (m. 1657)
- Children: 11+, including Charles
- Father: John Mordaunt
- Relatives: Henry Mordaunt (brother); William Howard (grandfather)

John Mordaunt, 1st Viscount Mordaunt (18 June 1627 – 5 June 1675) was an English peer.

== Life ==
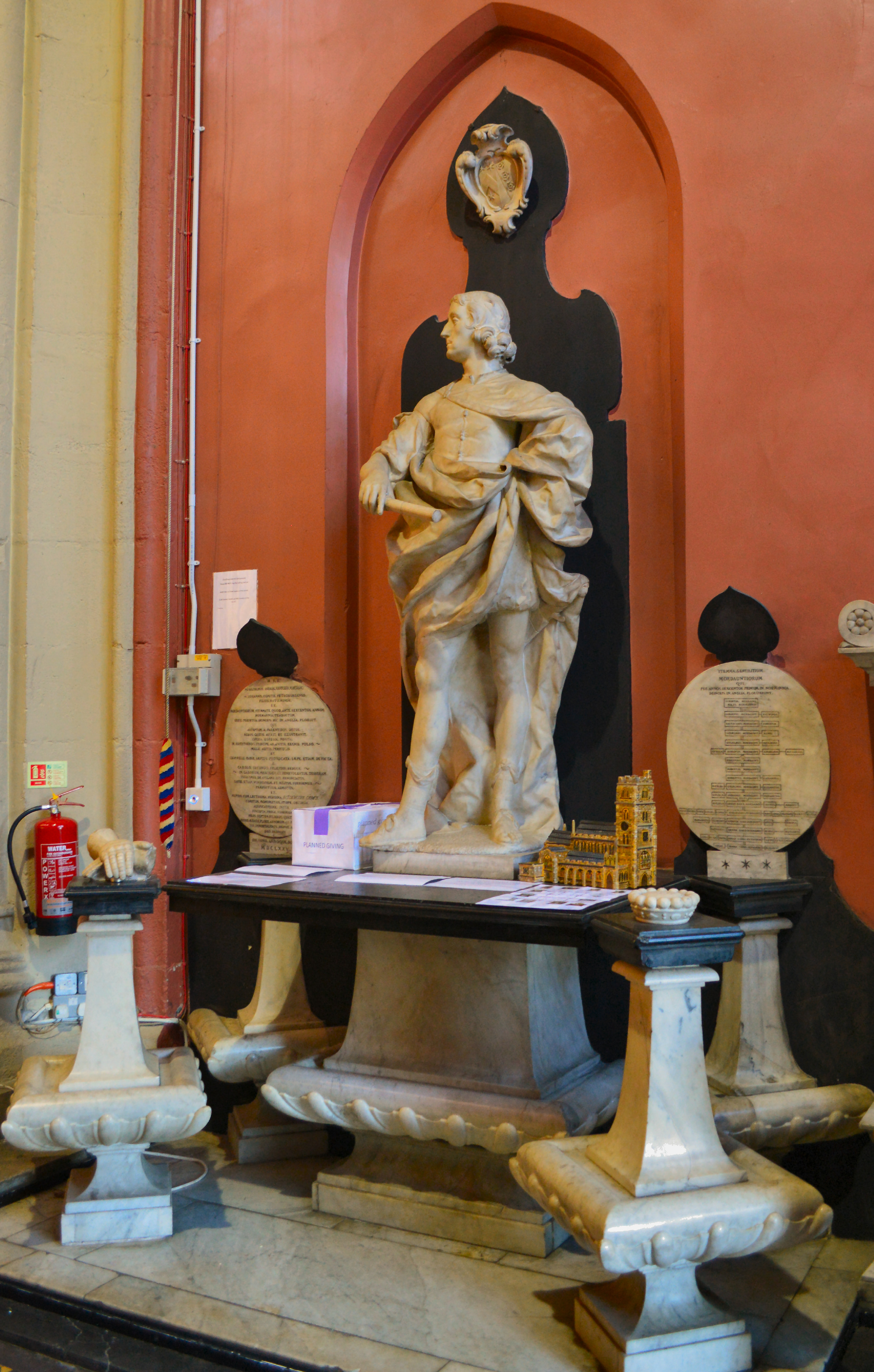
Fulham, All Saints Church, monument

He was born in Lowick, Northamptonshire, the second son of John Mordaunt, 1st Earl of Peterborough and Elizabeth Howard (d. 1671), daughter of William Howard, 3rd Baron Howard of Effingham. In June 1648, he joined his brother, Henry Mordaunt, 2nd Earl of Peterborough in leading a Royalist uprising, and fled with him to the Continent when it failed. He had returned to England by 1652, and married Elizabeth Carey on 7 May 1657.

He again engaged in Royalist conspiracy, and met the Marquess of Ormonde on his secret trip to England in 1658. Mordaunt was betrayed and arrested on 1 April 1658. Released and re-arrested on 15 April 1658, he was charged with treason. Thomas Pride, one of the commissioners to try him, fell ill, and a key witness escaped (possibly due to the efforts of his wife), and Mordaunt was acquitted by a vote of 20 to 19 by the commissioners.

This narrow escape did not deter his secret efforts on behalf of Charles II. However, although trusted by the King, Ormonde, and Hyde, many royalists (including the members of the Sealed Knot) disliked and mistrusted him. He was created Viscount Mordaunt of Avalon and Baron Mordaunt of Reigate on 10 July 1659 by Charles, who considered him the leader of his cause in England. However, the new rising he planned in June was several times delayed, partly because of friction with other royalists, and the Council of State ordered his arrest. The rising, in Surrey, drew only thirty followers, and Mordaunt narrowly escaped to France in September.

He returned to England again in October after the expulsion of the Rump Parliament, and was planning another rising, but his connections with Hyde occasioned suspicion and he received little favour from any party. He returned to France again in November, then to England again in January. His attempts to discredit Monck and promote French intervention were fruitless: he and Monck were both knighted by Charles at Dover on 25 May 1660.

He was appointed Constable of Windsor Castle, keeper of Windsor Great Park and Lord Lieutenant of Surrey upon the Restoration, but played little role at court. In 1666, he was charged in the House of Commons with having imprisoned William Taylor, surveyor of Windsor Castle, and raped Taylor's daughter. He was impeached by the Commons in December, but Parliament was prorogued in February, and the King pardoned him in July. He resigned his offices at Windsor in September 1668, and went abroad to Montpellier that year. He did not return to England until 1669, and thenceforth lived in retirement in his house at Parson's Green, Middlesex. He died there of a fever in 1675, and is buried at All Saints Church, Fulham, London.

== Family ==
Mordaunt married Elizabeth, the daughter of Thomas Carey of Sunninghill Park in Berkshire (a younger son of Robert Carey, 1st Earl of Monmouth), by whom he had eleven surviving children, among whom were:

- Charles Mordaunt, 3rd Earl of Peterborough (c. 1658–1735)
- Lieutenant-General Harry Mordaunt (1663–1720)
- Brigadier-General Lewis Mordaunt (b. 1670, d. 2 February 1713); through his daughter, Anna Maria Mordaunt (1715-1771), he was the great-grandfather of Georgiana Spencer, Duchess of Devonshire and her brother, George Spencer, 2nd Earl Spencer the ancestor of Diana, Princess of Wales.
- Osmond Mordaunt (d. 1 July 1690, Battle of the Boyne)
- Rev. George Mordaunt
- Charlotte Mordaunt, married Sir Joseph Alston, 3rd Baronet
- Sophia Mordaunt, married James Hamilton of Bangor, County Down; through her granddaughter Anne Ward, who married Sir John Parnell, 1st Baronet, she was the ancestor of the leading Irish statesman Charles Stewart Parnell
- Anne Mordaunt

Honorary titles
English Interregnum	Constable of Windsor Castle; 1660–1668	Succeeded by The Duke of Cumberland
English Interregnum	Lord Lieutenant of Surrey; 1660–1675	Succeeded by The Duke of Cumberland
English Interregnum	Custos Rotulorum of Surrey; 1660–1675	Succeeded by The Earl of Berkeley
Peerage of England
New creation	Viscount Mordaunt of Avalon; 1659–1675	Succeeded by Charles Mordaunt
