= Charles Mordaunt, 4th Earl of Peterborough =

British peer and politician

Personal details
- Born: 1708
- Died: 1 August 1779 (aged 70–71)
- Spouse(s): Mary; Robiniana
- Children: 3+
- Parent: John Mordaunt (father)
- Relatives: John Mordaunt (brother)

Charles Mordaunt, 4th Earl of Peterborough, 2nd Earl of Monmouth (1708 – 1 August 1779) was a British peer and Member of Parliament, styled Viscount Mordaunt from 1710 to 1735.

== Biography ==
He was the son of John Mordaunt, Viscount Mordaunt and Lady Frances Powlett, and succeeded his grandfather, Charles Mordaunt, 3rd Earl of Peterborough in the earldom.

He was married twice. By his first wife, Mary, he had at least one child:

- Mary Anastatia Grace Mordaunt (born 25 June 1738). In 1814, following the death of her half-brother, Charles Henry Mordaunt, 5th Earl of Peterborough, 10th Baron Mordaunt, she became the 11th Baroness Mordaunt. Mary died without issue in 1819.

He and his second wife, Robiniana, had the following children:

- Robiniana Mordaunt (born 30 June 1756)
- Charles Henry Mordaunt, 5th Earl of Peterborough (born 11 May 1758)
- Paulett Mordaunt (born 12 July 1759)

Peerage of England
| Preceded by Charles Mordaunt | Earl of Peterborough; Earl of Monmouth; 1735–1779 | Succeeded by Charles Mordaunt |
