= John Mordaunt (speaker) =

British politician (died 1506)

Sir John Mordaunt (died 1506) was an English landowner, barrister, and parliamentarian of the Tudor period, Speaker of the House of Commons. The offices he held included Chancellor of the Duchy of Lancaster.

Mordaunt was the son of William Mordaunt of Turvey, Bedfordshire, and entered the Middle Temple to train as a barrister. He was also summoned by Richard III to serve against the Scots in 1484, and fought for Henry VII at Stoke Field in 1487.

In 1485 and 1487 he served as an MP for unidentified constituencies, (probably in Bedfordshire), on the latter occasion being chosen to serve as speaker of the house. He was elected MP for Grantham in 1491 and knight of the shire for Bedfordshire in 1495. In the 1490s he became more active as a government administrator and lawyer and was knighted for his services in 1503. He was appointed High Steward of Cambridge University in 1504 and later the same year nominated to follow Sir Reginald Bray as Chancellor of the Duchy of Lancaster.

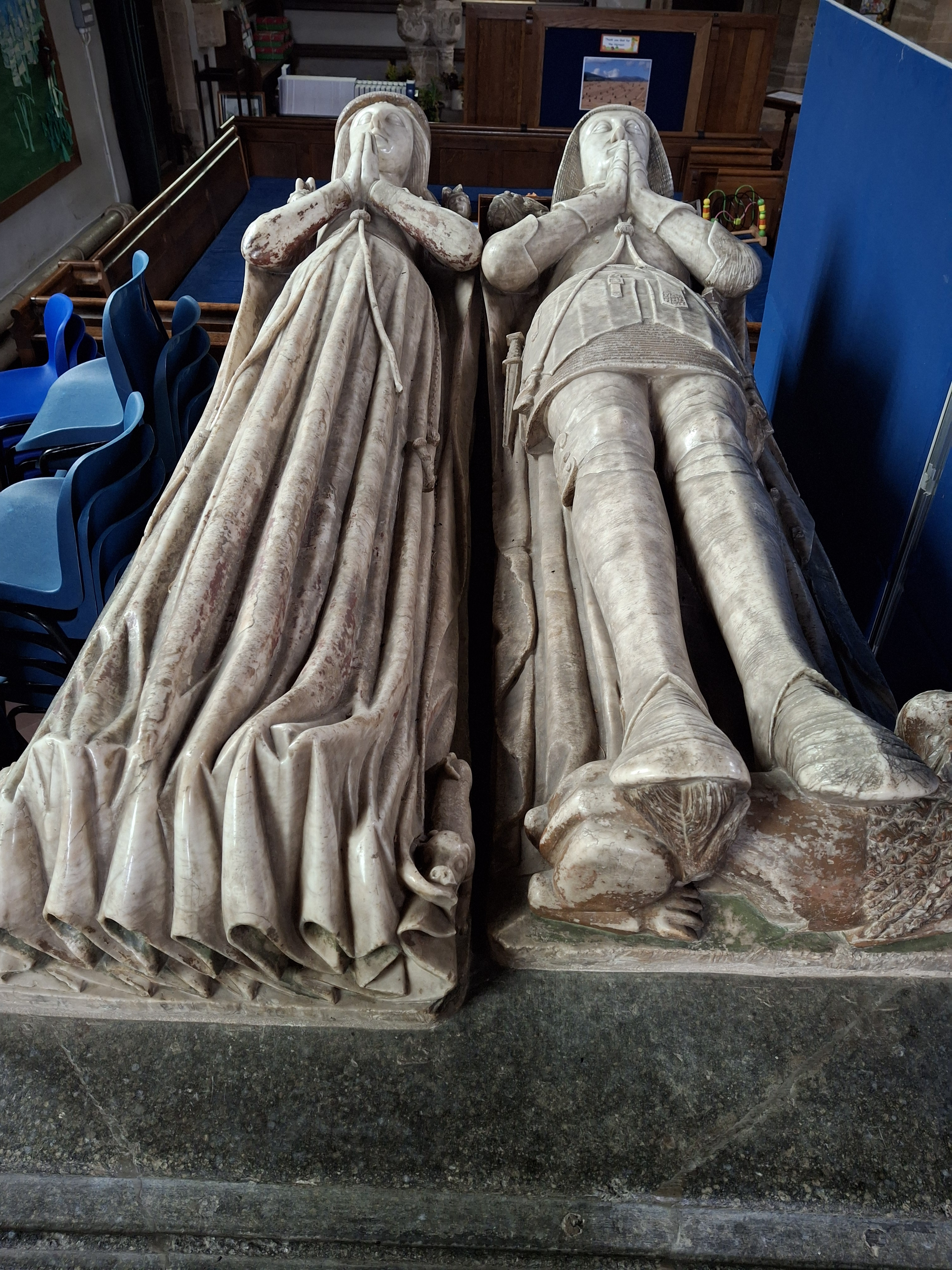
Sir John Mordaunt and his wife Edith Latimer – tomb in All Saints’ Church, Turvey, Bedfordshire

However, he died soon afterwards and was buried in Turvey church. He had married Edith, coheir of Sir Nicholas Latymer, with whom he had at least two sons and a daughter. His eldest son John would become first Lord Mordaunt.

Political offices
Preceded by Sir Thomas Lovell	Speaker of the House of Commons; 1487 – 1489	Succeeded by Sir Thomas Fitzwilliam
Preceded by Sir Reginald Bray	Chancellor of the Duchy of Lancaster; 1503–1505	Succeeded by Sir Richard Empson
