= Mary Howard, Duchess of Norfolk (died 1705) =

British peer, died 1705

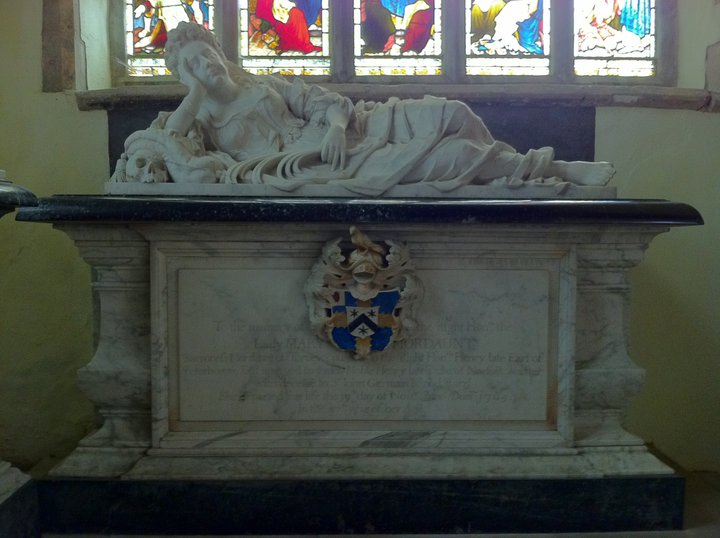
- Memorial to Mary Mordaunt, Duchess of Norfolk, in St Peter's Church, Lowick
- Born: c. 1659
- Died: 17 November 1705 (aged 45–46)
- Spouse(s): Henry Howard (m. 1677; div. 1700) John Germain (m. 1701)
- Father: Henry Mordaunt
- Relatives: John Mordaunt (grandfather); Barnabas O'Brien (grandfather)

Mary Howard, Duchess of Norfolk and 7th Baroness Mordaunt (c.1659–17 November 1705) was an English peer.

== Biography ==
Born Lady Mary Mordaunt, she was the only surviving child and heiress of Henry Mordaunt, 2nd Earl of Peterborough and Lady Penelope O'Brien, daughter of Barnabas O'Brien, 6th Earl of Thomond. On 8 August 1677, she married Henry Howard, Earl of Arundel. The Mordaunts being Protestant and the Howards Catholic, 'the wedding was perfectly private'. The earl succeeded his father as Duke of Norfolk in 1684. The Howard marriage was not a success and in 1685 the duke, himself a notorious rake, discovered his wife's liaison with Sir John Germain, 1st Baronet. The duchess was banished to a convent in France for six months, during which time she converted to Catholicism. On her return to England, the couple separated. The duchess retained her life interest in the Howard estates settled on her at the time of her marriage.

In 1692, facing financial difficulties and with the duchess pursuing her affair with Germain, the duke introduced a bill requesting a divorce into the House of Lords and sued Germain in the court of King's Bench. The bill failed. During the action for criminal conversation the details of Mary's affair with Germain were revealed in lurid detail. However, the case was regarded by even his own counsel as the pot calling the kettle black, and the jury, in finding for the duke, awarded such low damages that it was considered that the 'slightness of the satisfaction was almost as great a reproach as the crime itself'.

The duchess succeeded to her father's barony in 1697.

The duke and duchess were finally divorced in 1700, leaving the duke free to remarry and have legitimate heirs. In the event the duke died unmarried a year later and Mary was then free to marry Germain. She died without children from either marriage in 1705. Her title was inherited by her cousin, Charles, who had previously inherited her father's earldom, while her estates she left to her husband.

Her memorial is in St Peter's Church, Lowick.

Peerage of England
Preceded by Henry Mordaunt	Baroness Mordaunt; 1697–1705	Succeeded by Charles Mordaunt
