= Lewis Mordaunt, 3rd Baron Mordaunt =

16th-century English politician and peer

High Sheriff of Bedfordshire and Buckinghamshire
- In office 1570–1571

Member of Parliament for Bedfordshire
- In office 1563–1567

Personal details
- Born: 21 September 1538
- Died: 16 June 1601 (aged 62) Drayton, Northamptonshire, England
- Spouse: Elizabeth Darcy
- Children: 2+, including Henry
- Parent: John Mordaunt (father)

Lewis Mordaunt, 3rd Baron Mordaunt (21 September 1538 – 16 June 1601) was an English peer and politician.

== Biography ==
He was the son of John Mordaunt, 2nd Baron Mordaunt and Ela (née FitzLewis) Mordaunt. He became the third Baron Mordaunt in 1571 on the death of his father.

He was the Member of Parliament (MP) for Bedfordshire (1563–67) and High Sheriff of Bedfordshire and Buckinghamshire in 1570.

A lover of art and buildings, he was a reluctant judge at the trial of Mary, Queen of Scots, beheaded in 1587, with whose death sentence he did 'most unwillingly concur'. He commanded troops recruited to resist when it was thought that the Spanish Armada would invade in 1588.

He married Elizabeth Darcy, daughter of Sir Arthur Darcy and Mary Carew and was succeeded by their son Henry. His daughter Mary married Sir Thomas Mansell, 1st Baronet.

He died at his manor house in Drayton, Northamptonshire on 16 June 1601 and was buried in All Saints church Turvey, Bedfordshire on 20 July, where there is a plain black marble tomb.

== Notes ==
Parliament of England
Preceded by John St John; Thomas Pigott	Member of Parliament for Bedfordshire; 1563–1567; With: John St John	Succeeded by George Rotherham; Thomas Snagge
Political offices
Preceded by Sir Edmund Ashfield	High Sheriff of Bedfordshire and Buckinghamshire; 1570–1571	Succeeded by Thomas Pigott
Peerage of England
Preceded by John Mordaunt	Baron Mordaunt; 1571–1601	Succeeded by Henry Mordaunt
