= John Mordaunt, 2nd Baron Mordaunt =

Member of the Parliament of England

John Mordaunt
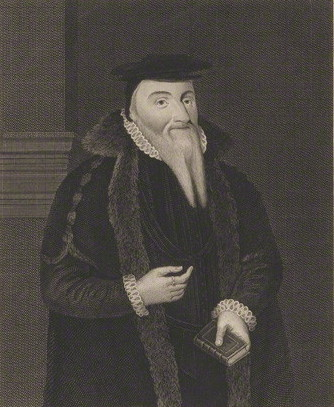

2nd Baron Mordaunt
- In office 1562–1571

Member of the English Parliament for Bedfordshire
- In office 1553–1555

Personal details
- Born: 1508
- Died: 1571 (aged 62–63)
- Spouses: Ella Fitzlewis; Joan Fermor
- Children: at least 10, including Lewis
- Parents: John Mordaunt, 1st Baron Mordaunt (father); Elizabeth Vere (mother)

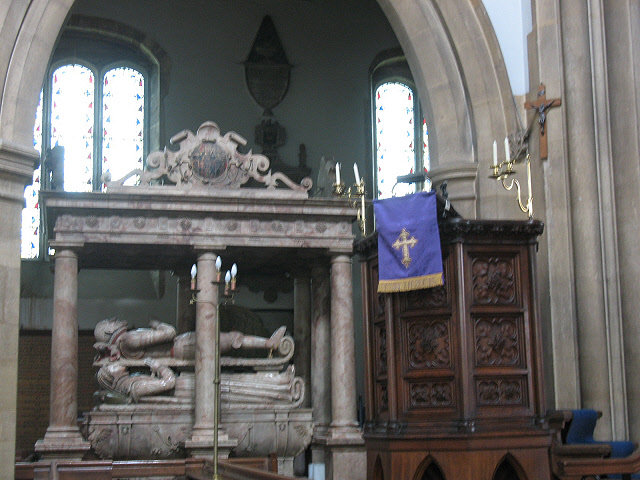
Tomb in Turvey church, Bedfordshire

John Mordaunt, 2nd Baron Mordaunt (1508–1571) was an English baron and member of the House of Lords. He had previously represented Bedfordshire in the House of Commons of England.

He was the eldest son of John Mordaunt, 1st Baron Mordaunt of Turvey by Elizabeth, the daughter and coheiress of Sir Henry Vere of Great Addington, Northamptonshire. He was knighted in 1533 and inherited the title Baron Mordaunt on his father's death in 1562.

He was appointed High Sheriff of Essex and High Sheriff of Hertfordshire for 1540–41 and Constable of Hertford Castle from 1554. He served as a Privy Councillor (PC) from 1553. He was elected MP for Bedfordshire in 1553, April and November 1554 and 1555.

He died in 1571 and was buried at Turvey. He had married twice: firstly Ella, the daughter and heiress of John Fitzlewis, with whom he had several sons and 6 daughters and secondly Joan, the daughter of Richard Fermor of Easton Neston, Northamptonshire, and the widow of Robert Wilford of London. He was succeeded by his estranged son Lewis.

Peerage of England
Preceded by John Mordaunt	Baron Mordaunt; 1562–1571	Succeeded by Lewis Mordaunt
