= John Mordaunt, Viscount Mordaunt =

English soldier and politician

Member of Parliament for Chippenham
- In office 1701–1705; 1705–1707; 1707–1708

Personal details
- Born: c. 1681
- Died: 5 April 1710 (aged 28–29)
- Party: Whig
- Spouse: Frances Powlett (m. 1708)
- Children: Charles; John
- Parents: Charles Mordaunt (father); Carey Fraser (mother)
- Education: Christ Church, Oxford
- Military career
- Rank: Brigadier
- Commands: 1st Foot Guards; Scots Fuzileers; 28th Regiment
- Wars: War of the Spanish Succession

Brigadier John Mordaunt, Viscount Mordaunt (c. 1681 – 5 April 1710) was an English soldier and politician.

== Career ==
The eldest son of Charles Mordaunt, 3rd Earl of Peterborough, he was educated at Christ Church, Oxford, after travelling in Holland in 1699.

He was elected, as a Whig Member of Parliament for Chippenham in 1701 despite a petition alleging, among other things, he was still a minor. (That year he was aged about 20.) He was a political ally of his father's and managed the attempt to impeach Lord Somers in the House of Commons in the same year. At the general election of 1705 he vacated his seat to unsuccessfully contest Nottinghamshire but returned to Chippenham later that year in a by-election caused by the death of a newly returned Whig member, and sat until 1708.

He saw distinguished service during the War of the Spanish Succession. As a captain, he led the forlorn hope of the 1st Foot Guards at the Battle of Schellenberg in 1704, and was one of the few to survive that bloody assault. Shortly thereafter, he helped lead another furious assault at the Battle of Blenheim and lost his left arm. On 25 August 1704, he was made colonel of the Scots Fuzileers in place of Brigadier Archibald Rowe, killed in the attack at Blenheim. On 26 June 1706 he exchanged regiments with Sampson de Lalo, then colonel of the 28th regiment, but resumed the colonelcy of the Scots Fuzileers in 1709 when de Lalo was killed at the Battle of Malplaquet.

== Marriage ==
In 1708, he married Lady Frances Powlett (d. 1715), daughter of Charles Paulet, 2nd Duke of Bolton. They had two sons:

- Charles Mordaunt, 4th Earl of Peterborough (1708–1779)
- Lt.-Col. John Mordaunt (c. 1709–1767)

He died of smallpox on 5 April 1710, and was buried at Turvey on 13 April.

Parliament of England
Preceded by Walter White; Edward Montagu	Member of Parliament for Chippenham; 1701–1705; With: Walter White 1701–1702; James Montagu 1702–1705	Succeeded by Sir James Long, Bt; Walter White
Preceded by Sir James Long, Bt; Walter White	Member of Parliament for Chippenham; 1705–1707; With: Sir James Long, Bt	Succeeded by Parliament of Great Britain
Parliament of Great Britain
Preceded by Parliament of England	Member of Parliament for Chippenham; 1707–1708; With: Sir James Long, Bt	Succeeded by Sir James Long, Bt; James Montagu
Military offices
Preceded by Archibald Rowe	Colonel of the Scots Fuzileers; 1704–1706	Succeeded by Sampson de Lalo
Preceded by Sampson de Lalo	Colonel of Viscount Mordaunt's Regiment of Foot; 1706	Succeeded by Andrews Windsor
Preceded by Sampson de Lalo	Colonel of the Scots Fuzileers; 1709–1710	Succeeded by Thomas Meredyth
