= Henry Mordaunt, 2nd Earl of Peterborough =

English soldier, peer, and courtier (1621–1697)

Henry Mordaunt 2nd Earl of Peterborough
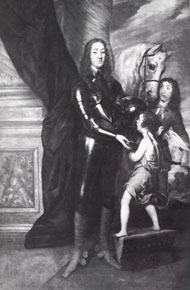
- Born: 15 November 1621
- Died: 19 June 1697 (aged 75)
- Military career
- Allegiance: England

Henry Mordaunt, 2nd Earl of Peterborough KG PC FRS (15 November 1621 – 19 June 1697) was an English soldier, peer and courtier.

== Early life ==
Styled Lord Mordaunt from 1628, he was the eldest son of John Mordaunt, 1st Earl of Peterborough. He was educated at Eton, under Sir Henry Wotton, and shortly before the outbreak of the First English Civil War was sent to France to be out of harm's way.

He returned to England in 1642, and served for a little while in the parliamentary army, where he commanded his ailing father's troop of horse. In April 1643, after his father's death, he deserted to the king at Oxford. Now Earl of Peterborough, he joined the Cavaliers and fought at the battles of Bristol, Gloucester and Newbury in 1643. At Newbury, he was wounded in the arm and thigh, and had his horse shot under him. In command of a regiment raised at his own expense he served in the west during the following summer and winter, at Cropredy Bridge and Lostwithiel in 1644. In about December 1644, he married Lady Penelope O'Brien (the only daughter of the Barnabas O'Brien, 6th Earl of Thomond) and they had two daughters. He was in France during the later phases of the struggle. In 1646 he returned to England and compounded for his estates. A private interview with Charles I as he passed through Ampthill to Hampton Court, in the summer of 1647, prompted him to make a last effort on the king's behalf, and in July 1648 he united with George Villiers, 2nd Duke of Buckingham and Henry Rich, 1st Earl of Holland in raising the royal standard at Dorking. The plan was to seize Reigate, but foiled in this, the insurgents were driven back on Kingston, and eventually dispersed in the neighbourhood of Harrow by the parliamentary forces (7 July). Mordaunt was severely wounded, but escaped to Antwerp, and in the following year returned to England and recompounded for his estates (May 1649).

== Under Charles II ==
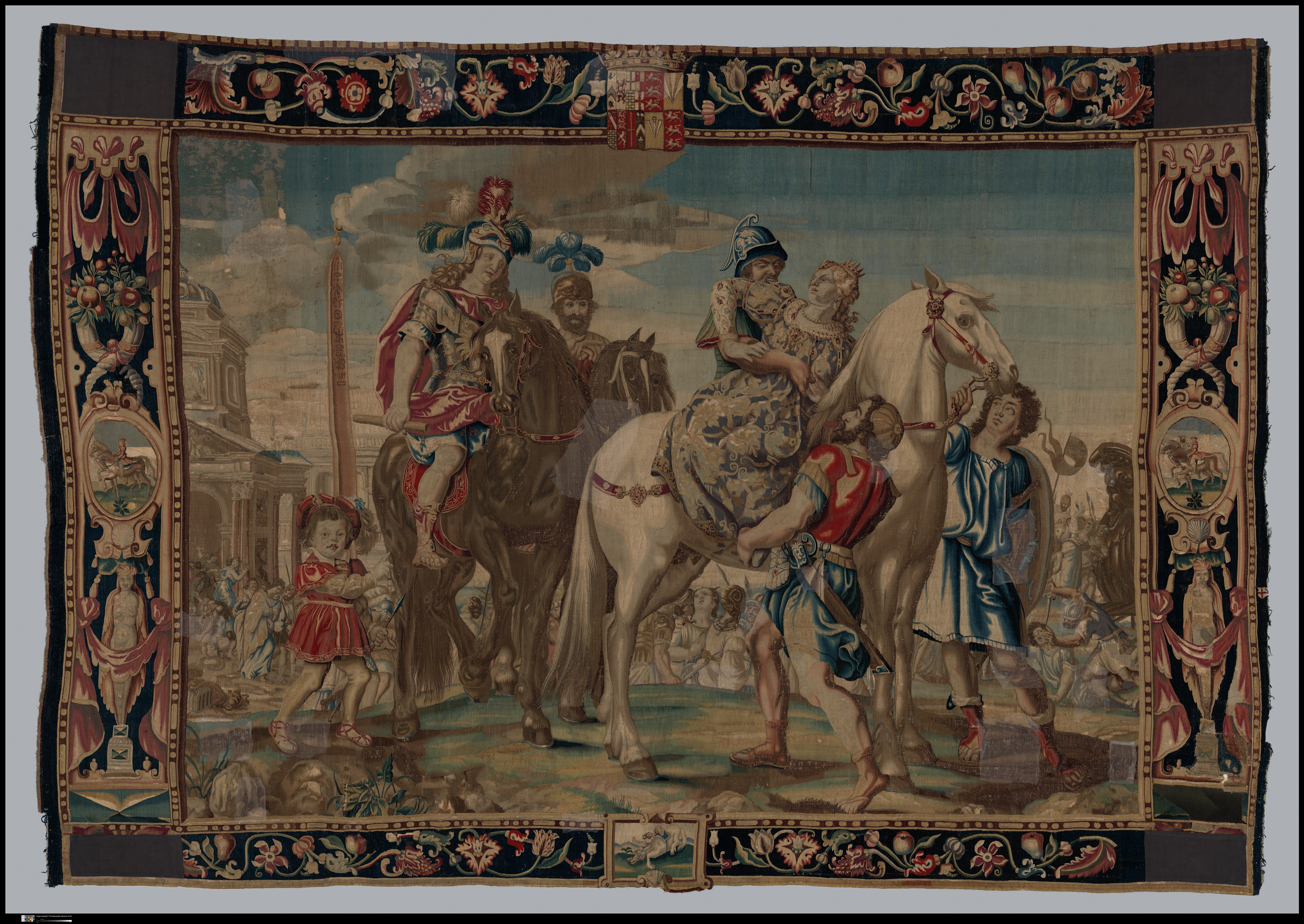
Mortlake tapestry owned and presumably commissioned by Mordaunt, The Seizure of Cassandra by Ajax from a set of The Horses, c. 1650-70.

When Charles married Catherine of Braganza in 1661, he acquired English Tangier as part of her dowry and Peterborough was sent there as its Governor, arriving 29 January 1662 in command of a regiment of foot which he raised in England (and which would become known as the Tangier Regiment), Harley's (ex-Parliamentary) regiment from Flanders, and remnants of Royalist regiments, also from Flanders. The force was ill-equipped, lacking basic supplies of fuel, beds, cooking pots and ordnance equipment. In April 1662, he concluded a treaty with the Moors under Ahmad al-Khadir ibn Ali Ghaïlan but, in a disastrous sally out (3 May 1662), his force was soundly defeated. Confining the rest of the troops within the city walls, he himself returned to England unexpectedly, arriving in Plymouth on 8 June 1662. He was sent back, with some reinforcements, but was recalled in December of that year and replaced by Andrew Rutherford. He himself was awarded a generous pension.

He served in the Dutch war, at first as a volunteer in the fleet of the Earl of Sandwich, afterwards in command of the Unicorn at the Battle of Lowestoft in 1665 under James, Duke of York. Later he commanded the Prince at the Battle of Solebay in 1672.

In 1670 he was appointed Groom of the Stole to the Duke of York, and on 24 February 1673 ambassador extraordinary to arrange the terms of his proposed marriage with the Archduchess Claudia Felicitas of Innsbruck. He had hardly crossed the Channel, however, when the news of the Emperor Leopold I's determination to marry the archduchess himself put an end to the project. He was then commissioned to ascertain the respective personal and other attractions of the Princess Mary of Modena, and several other ladies between whom the duke's choice lay, and Mary having been fixed upon, proceeded to Modena in the following August as ambassador extraordinary to arrange the match. After some demur on the grounds of religion, Pope Clement X refusing a dispensation for the marriage of the princess with a prince who was not a declared Catholic, the scruples of the family were overcome, Peterborough being proxy for the duke (30 September 1673). Peterborough then escorted the princess to England.

On 10 July 1674 Peterborough was sworn of the privy council, and in 1676 was appointed deputy earl-marshal. In 1680 he was deprived of that office and his pension, and excluded from the council, on suspicion of complicity in the alleged Popish Plot. Nevertheless, though suffering from fever, he had himself carried down to Westminster Hall, to vote against the condemnation of Lord Stafford (7 December) In October 1681 he was summoned to Scotland by the Duke of York, whom he attended on his return to England in the following March. On 28 February 1683, he was restored to his place in the council.

== Under James II ==
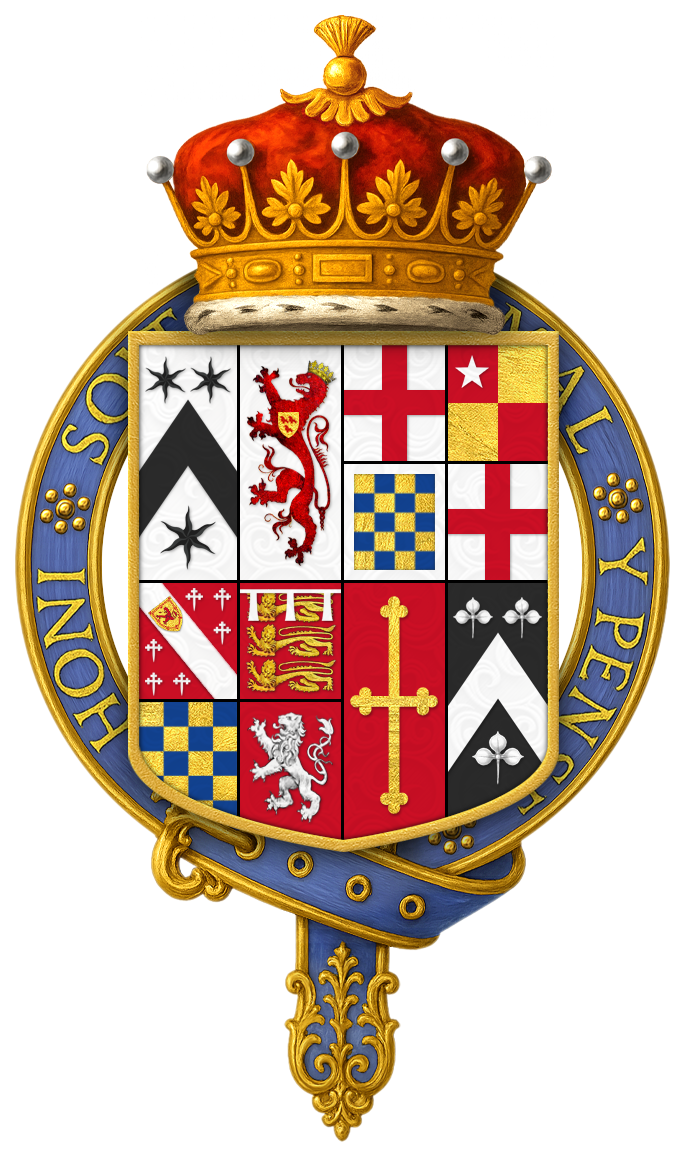
Quartered of arms of Henry Mordaunt, 2nd Earl of Peterborough, KG

He bore St. Edward's sceptre at the coronation of James II, by whom he was made Groom of the Stole and a Knight of the Garter in 1685, and colonel of the 3rd regiment of horse. In March 1687 he was received into the Roman church. When the King fled England in 1688, Peterborough was caught trying to escape with him, taken near Ramsgate and committed to the Tower of London (24 December).

== Later life ==
He was stripped of all his former offices and on 26 October 1689 he was impeached of high treason, together with the Earl of Salisbury, 'in departing from their allegiance, and being reconciled to the Church of Rome'. The proceedings were stalled by the subsequent dissolution, and on 9 October 1690, he was released on bail. In February 1696 he again fell under suspicion of treasonable practices, and was confined to his own house, but was enlarged the following May. Peterborough was lord of the manors of Turvey in Bedfordshire and Drayton, Northamptonshire, and was for many years lord-lieutenant of the latter county. He died on 19 June 1697, and was buried in the parish church of Turvey.

== Family ==
Peterborough married, in 1644, Lady Penelope O'Brien, daughter of Barnabas O'Brien, 6th Earl of Thomond and Anne Fermor, by whom he had two daughters: Elizabeth, who died unmarried, and Mary, who married Henry Howard, 7th Duke of Norfolk, from whom she was divorced in 1700. The Countess of Peterborough was the groom of the stole to Mary of Modena, and survived till April 1702. Samuel Pepys admired her: "a very wise woman".

On his death in 1697, his earldom passed to his nephew, the Earl of Monmouth, and his barony (which was able to pass through the female line) passed to his daughter, the Duchess of Norfolk. Since she died childless, the barony returned to the earls of Peterborough until that title died out in 1814.

Military offices
Preceded by Luís de Almeida; 1st Count of Avintes	Governor of Tangier; 1661–1663	Succeeded by The Earl of Teviot
New regiment	Colonel of the Tangier Regiment; 1661–1663	Succeeded by The Earl of Teviot
New regiment	Colonel of The Earl of Peterborough's; Regiment of Horse; 1685–1688	Succeeded by Hon. Edward Villiers
Political offices
Preceded by The Earl of Bath	Groom of the Stole; 1685–1688	Succeeded by Baron Hans Bentinck
Honorary titles
Preceded by The Earl of Exeter; The Earl of Westmorland	Lord Lieutenant of Northamptonshire; East Northamptonshire only 1673–1678; 1666–1689; With: The Earl of Exeter 1666–1673	Succeeded by The Earl of Monmouth
Preceded by The Earl of Gainsborough; Viscount Campden	Lord Lieutenant of Rutland; 1688–1690	Succeeded by The Lord Sherard
Peerage of England
Preceded by John Mordaunt	Earl of Peterborough; 1643–1697	Succeeded by Charles Mordaunt
Preceded by John Mordaunt	Baron Mordaunt; 1643–1697	Succeeded by Mary Howard
