= John Mordaunt, 1st Baron Mordaunt =

English politician and peer

High Sheriff of Bedfordshire and Buckinghamshire
- In office 1509–1510

Personal details
- Died: 18 August 1562
- Spouse: Elizabeth Vere
- Children: 8, including John
- Parent: John Mordaunt (father)

John Mordaunt, 1st Baron Mordaunt (died 18 August 1562) was an English politician and peer.

== Biography ==
He was the son of John Mordaunt of Turvey, Bedfordshire, who was a member of parliament and speaker of the House of Commons of England and Edith Latimer. He was admitted to the Middle Temple in 1503 to be trained as a barrister.

He was made a Knight of the Bath when the future Henry VIII was created Prince of Wales on 18 February 1503. He succeeded his father in 1504, inheriting his Bedfordshire estates, and was appointed High Sheriff of Bedfordshire and Buckinghamshire for 1509. He was a member of Henry VIII's court and was with him at the Field of the Cloth of Gold in 1520 and a member of his council in 1526 and was created Baron Mordaunt in 1529. He took his seat in the House of Lords in 1532. The following year he assisted at the reception of Anne Boleyn and subsequently took part in her trial.

He became active in local government and rarely visited Parliament, especially after an accident in 1539.

He died in 1562 and was buried in Turvey church alongside his wife, who had predeceased him.

== Marriage and family ==
Mordaunt married Elizabeth Vere, daughter and coheir of Sir Henry Vere of Great Addington, Northamptonshire. They had four sons and five daughters, including:

- Anne, who married John Fisher.
- Margaret
- John Mordaunt, 2nd Baron Mordaunt, his eldest son.
- Edmund, who became MP for Bedford.
- Edith
- William Mordaunt of Oakley, Bedfordshire, b. 1522, who married Agnes Booth. Their daughter Jane Mordaunt married (1) Richard Bolde of Bold, and (2) John Edwards of Plas Newydd, Chirk. John Edwards had previously married Dorothy Sherborn of Stonyhurst and Jane Puleston, the widow of Randal Broughton. Another daughter of William and Agnes, Anne Mordaunt married Nicholas Williamson in 1573, a legal agent of the Earl of Shrewsbury. They were recusants. In 1595 he was arrested and imprisoned in the Tower of London, suspected of working with Francis Dacre to convert James VI of Scotland to Catholicism. Their family papers were confiscated from their house at Church Wilne, and it was discovered she had left two pillowcases stuffed with documents with a friend. After his release, Williamson deserted her, and she later married Paul Cuddington of Cuddington. The confiscated papers survive in the National Archives and include Anne Williamson's letter to her husband asking for a farthingale and sleeves to be made for her in the latest style.
- George
- Winifred, married John Cheney
- Etheldred, a nun at Barking.
- Dorothy

Political offices
Preceded by George Harvey	High Sheriff of Bedfordshire and Buckinghamshire; 1509–1510	Succeeded by John Dyve
Peerage of England
New creation	Baron Mordaunt; 1529–1562	Succeeded by John Mordaunt
