= John Mordaunt, 1st Earl of Peterborough =

English peer

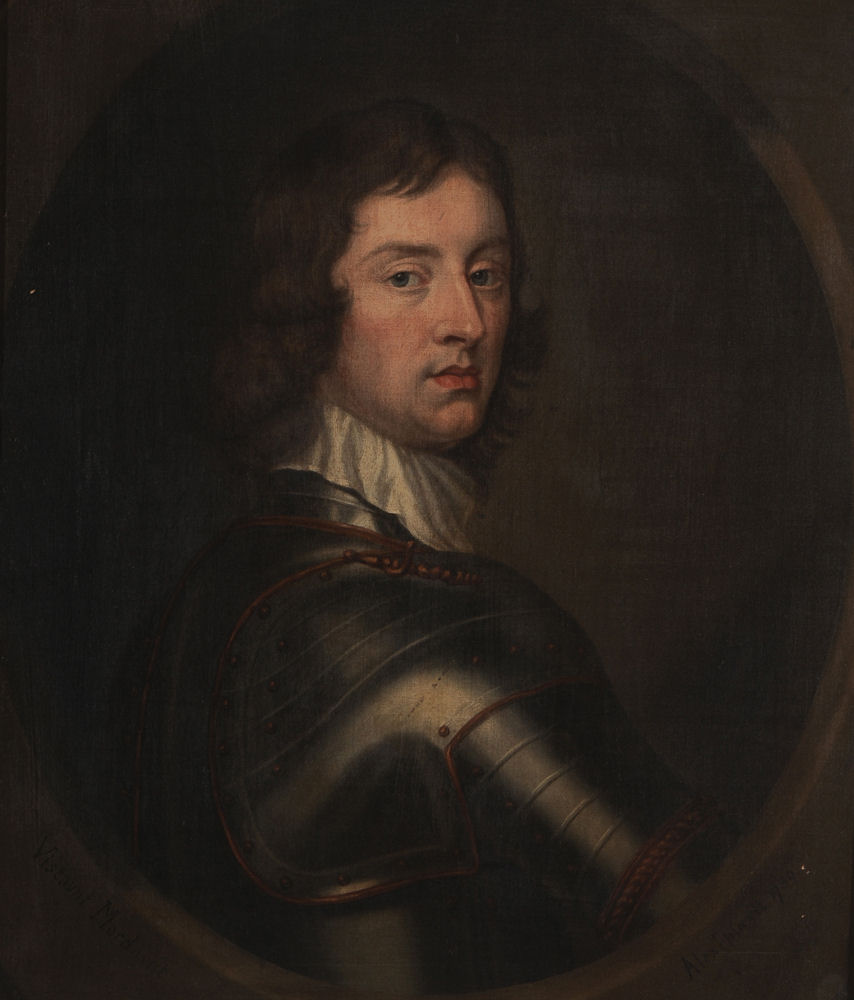
- Died: 18 June 1642
- Education: Oxford University
- Spouse: Elizabeth Howard
- Children: 3, including Henry and John
- Father: Henry Mordaunt
- Relatives: Lewis Mordaunt (grandfather); Henry Compton (grandfather)

John Mordaunt, 1st Earl of Peterborough (died 18 June 1642) was an English peer.

== Life ==
He was the eldest son of Henry Mordaunt, 4th Baron Mordaunt, a Roman Catholic kept for a year in the Tower of London on suspicion of complicity in the Gunpowder Plot, who died in 1610. The widow, Lady Margaret, daughter of Henry Compton, 1st Baron Compton, also a Catholic, was deprived by James I of the custody of her child John. He was made a ward of Archbishop George Abbot, and educated at Oxford.

Taken to court by the king, who was struck by his beauty and intelligence, John was made a K.B. on the occasion of Prince Charles being created Prince of Wales, 3 November 1616, and was remitted an unpaid fine of £10,000 which had been imposed on his father. By Charles I, he was created Earl of Peterborough, by letters patent of 9 March 1628.

On the outbreak of the First English Civil War he adhered to the parliament, and held the commission of general of the ordnance under the Earl of Essex, but he died of consumption, on 18 June 1642. By his wife Elizabeth, daughter of William Howard, 3rd Baron Howard of Effingham, he left two sons: Henry Mordaunt, 2nd Earl of Peterborough and John, afterwards Lord Mordaunt of Reigate and Viscount Mordaunt of Avalon; and a daughter, Elizabeth, who married Thomas, son and heir to Edward Howard, 1st Lord Howard of Escrick. Lady Peterborough was a noted beauty but was also famed for piety: she was a close friend of James Ussher, Archbishop of Armagh, who spent his last years in her house. She died in 1671.

Political offices
Preceded by The Earl of Exeter	Lord Lieutenant of Northamptonshire; 1640–1642	Interregnum
Peerage of England
New creation	Earl of Peterborough; 1628–1642	Succeeded by Henry Mordaunt
Preceded by Henry Mordaunt	Baron Mordaunt; 1609–1642	Succeeded by Henry Mordaunt
