= Earl of Monmouth =

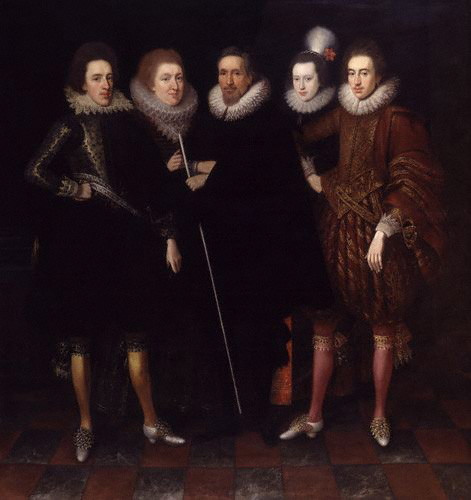
The Monmouths, from left to right: Henry Carey, 2nd Earl of Monmouth (1595–1661); Elizabeth, Countess of Monmouth; Robert Carey, 1st Earl of Monmouth; Philadelphia, Lady Wharton; Thomas Carey

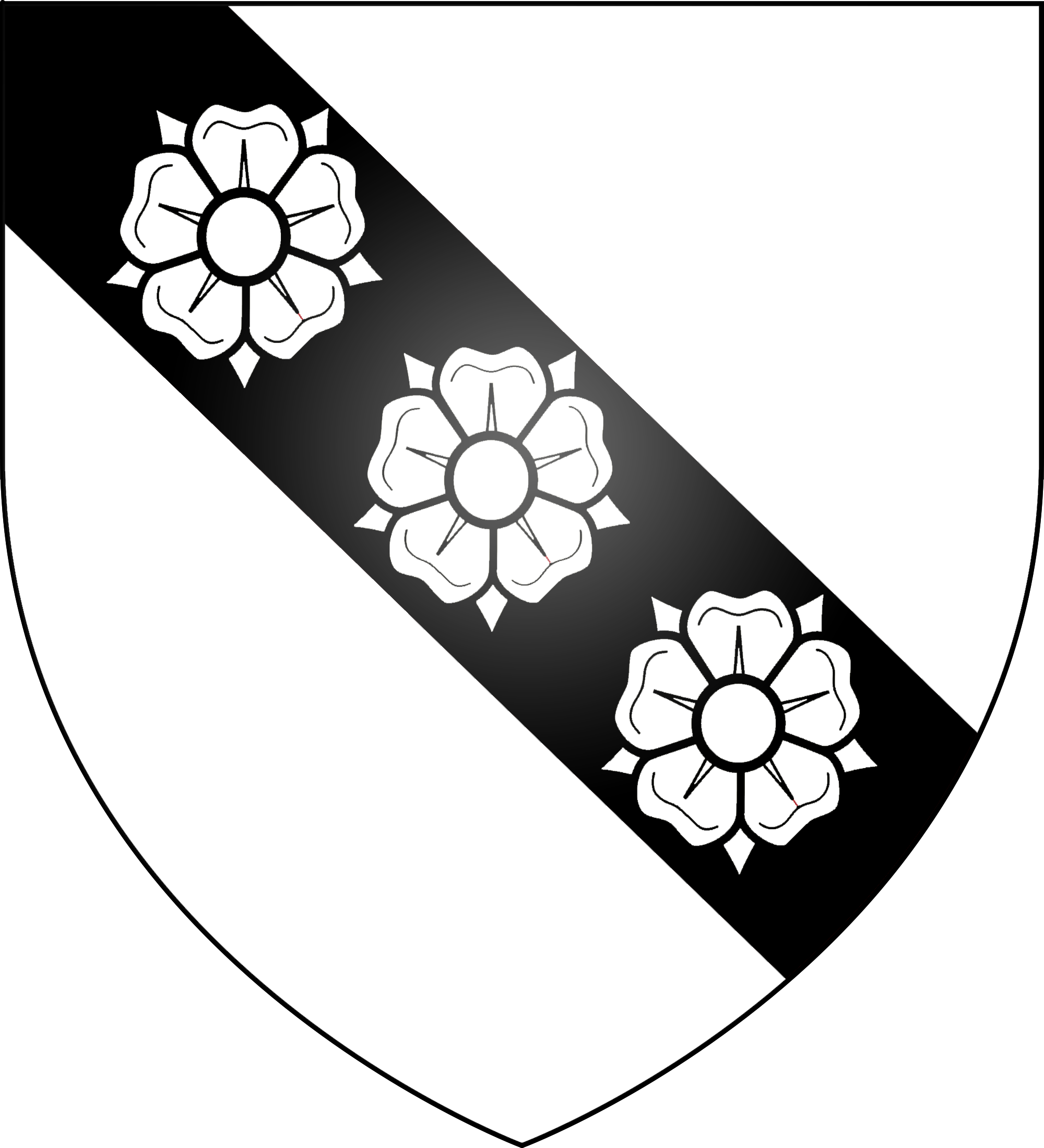
Arms of Cary: Argent, on a bend sable three roses of the field

Earl of Monmouth was a title that was created twice in the Peerage of England. The title was first created for English courtier Robert Carey, 1st Baron Carey in 1626. He had already been created Baron Carey, of Leppington, in 1622, also in the Peerage of England. The titles became extinct upon the death of his son, the second Earl, who died without surviving male issue in 1661. The second creation, in 1689, was for the great-grandson of the first Earl of the first creation, Charles Mordaunt, 2nd Viscount Mordaunt. In 1697 he succeeded his uncle as Earl of Peterborough. See the latter title for more information.

In 1701, Charles Middleton, previously 2nd Earl of Middleton was awarded the Jacobite peerages of Earl of Monmouth and Viscount Clermont in the Peerage of England.

== Earls of Monmouth; First creation (1626) ==
- Robert Carey, 1st Earl of Monmouth (1560–1639)
- Henry Carey, 2nd Earl of Monmouth (1596–1661)

== Earls of Monmouth; Second creation (1689) ==
- see Earl of Peterborough

== See also ==
- Duke of Monmouth
