= Drayton, Northamptonshire =

Hamlet in Northamptonshire, England

Coordinates: 52.26°N 1.18°W

Drayton
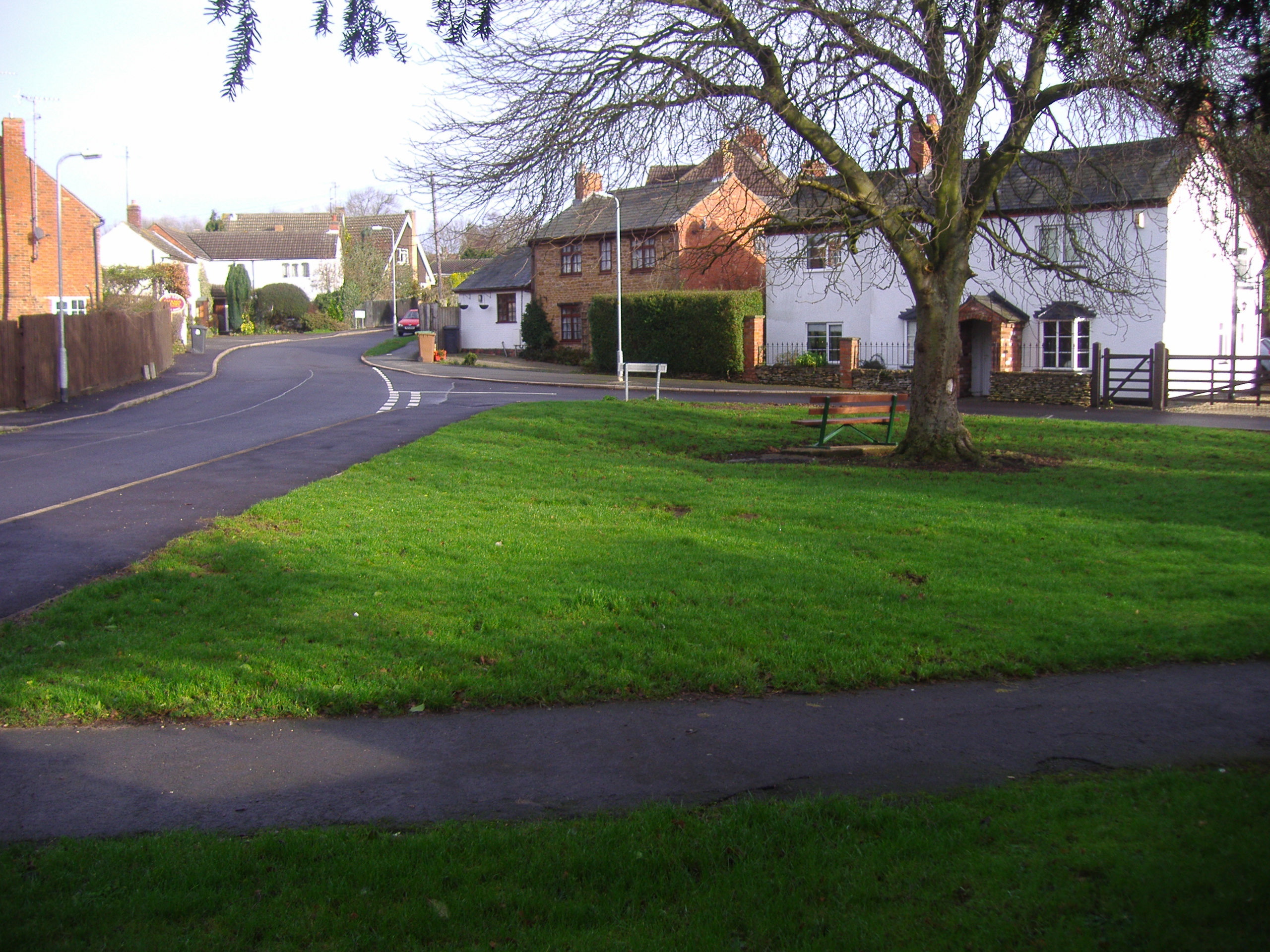
- Drayton Green

- Location within Northamptonshire
- Population: 6,415 (2001 census) Includes Daventry
- OS grid reference: SP5763
- Unitary authority: West Northamptonshire
- Ceremonial county: Northamptonshire
- Region: East Midlands
- Country: England
- Sovereign state: United Kingdom
- Post town: DAVENTRY
- Postcode district: NN11
- Dialling code: 01327
- Police: Northamptonshire
- Fire: Northamptonshire
- Ambulance: East Midlands
- UK Parliament: Daventry

Drayton is a hamlet in England, in the county of Northamptonshire, in the parish of Daventry, 3/4 mile (1.2 km) from the centre, occupying mainly with suburban housing on the lower-lying north western side of the town.

== Toponymy ==
The name derives from the Old English "Drægtūn", meaning "farmstead at or near a portage or slope used for dragging down loads" or "Farmstead where drays or sledges are used". This is a common place-name throughout England.

== History ==
Not much is known about the origins of the hamlet but it is thought to be as old, or nearly as old, as Daventry. It is thought to have peasant origins, although a Roman pavement was discovered near the hamlet in 1736.

It was enclosed in 1753. In recent years the hamlet has expanded and is surrounded by and is part of the modern town of Daventry (both civil and ecclesiastical parishes).

There are seven buildings or groups of buildings on the List of Buildings of Special Architectural or Historic Interest. They are all listed as Grade II in the Daventry list under Orchard Street, the Orchards and School Street. They include the Manor House and the school built in 1859 which once catered for the education of 45 children, but it is now a private residence.

== Gallery ==
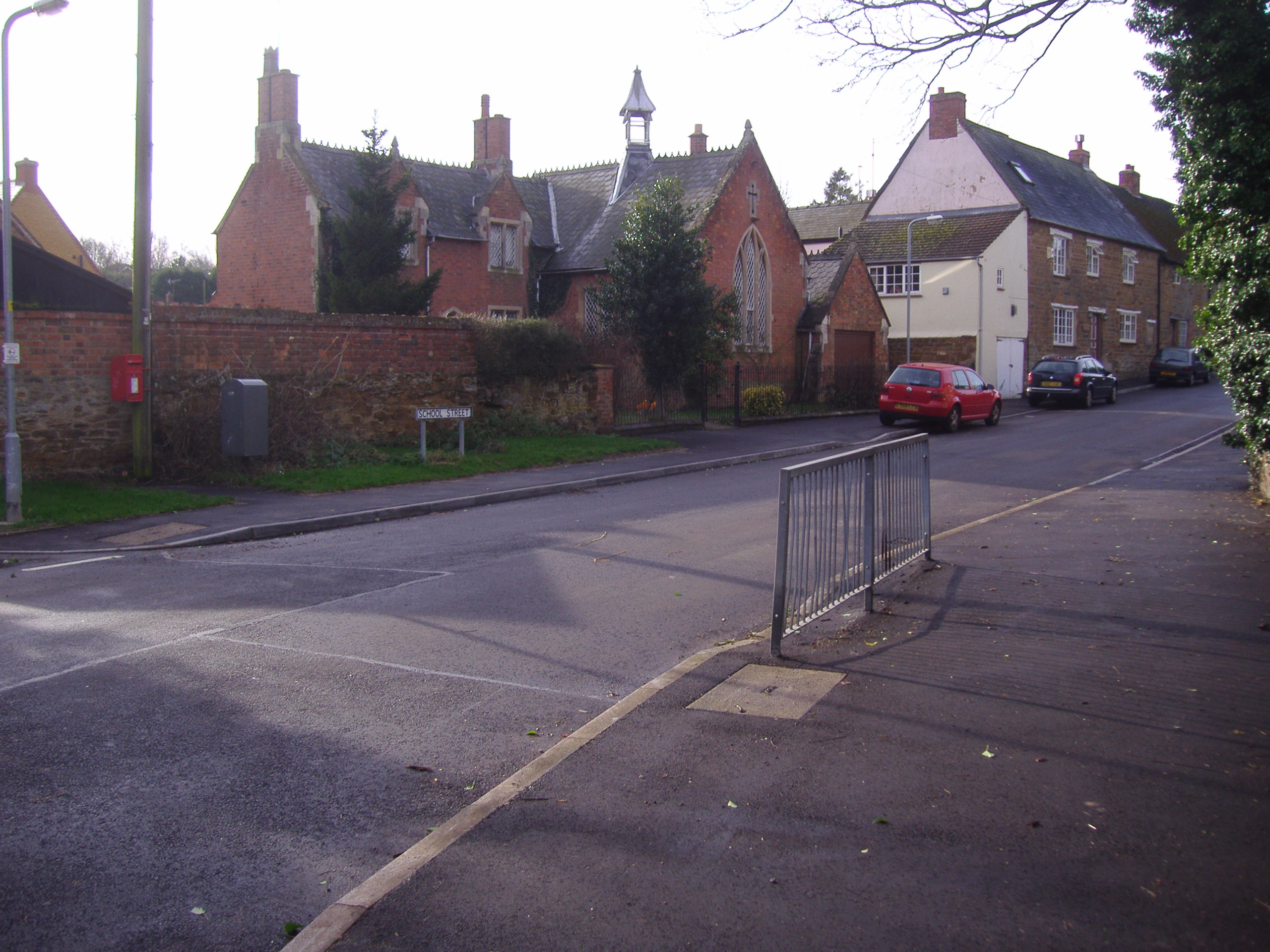
The Old School House
