= Robert Marshall (Irish judge) =

Irish judge and politician

Robert Marshall (c.1695–1774) was an Irish judge. He is remembered chiefly as co-executor and legatee of Esther Vanhomrigh, the beloved "Vanessa" of Jonathan Swift, although he was not a close friend of hers; indeed it is possible that they never met.

== Personal life ==
He was born in Clonmel, County Tipperary, son of John Marshall, styled as a "gentleman" and his wife Catherine. He was educated at Clonmel Free School and Kilkenny College, entered Middle Temple in 1718 and was called to the Irish Bar in 1723. His father committed suicide in Clonmel in 1717.

He moved house several times before buying a country house at Monkstown, Dublin. In 1741 he married a great heiress, Mary Wooley, daughter of Benjamin Wooley of East Sheen, near London, who is said to have brought him a dowry of £30,000. She died childless in 1743. He outlived her by thirty years, despite his own increasing ill-health, which led to frequent visits to England in hope of a cure. He was buried in Christ Church Cathedral, Waterford.

He purchased a house at the at that time fashionable number 20 Dominick Street in 1758 from the painter and property developer Robert West.

== Legal and political career ==
He was appointed Third Serjeant in 1738 and Second Serjeant in 1741. As a barrister he made his reputation in the celebrated Annesley case, in which James Annesley claimed to be the rightful Earl of Anglesey against the rival claim of his uncle, which is often said to be the inspiration for the novel Kidnapped by Robert Louis Stevenson. His practice was lucrative, though the bulk of what became a great fortune was undoubtedly due to his advantageous marriage to Mary Wooley. He sat in the Irish House of Commons as member for Clonmel and was generally a reliable Government supporter; he was also Recorder of Clonmel at intervals between 1727 and 1747, and served as Mayor of Clonmel four times. He was High Sheriff of County Tipperary in 1729. He also took an interest in the affairs of County Waterford, particularly after the marriage of his sister Elizabeth to Thomas Christmas MP, the head of a family which played a leading role in the political life of Waterford for several generations. He became a judge of the Court of Common Pleas (Ireland) in 1754 and retired in 1766.

== Vanessa ==
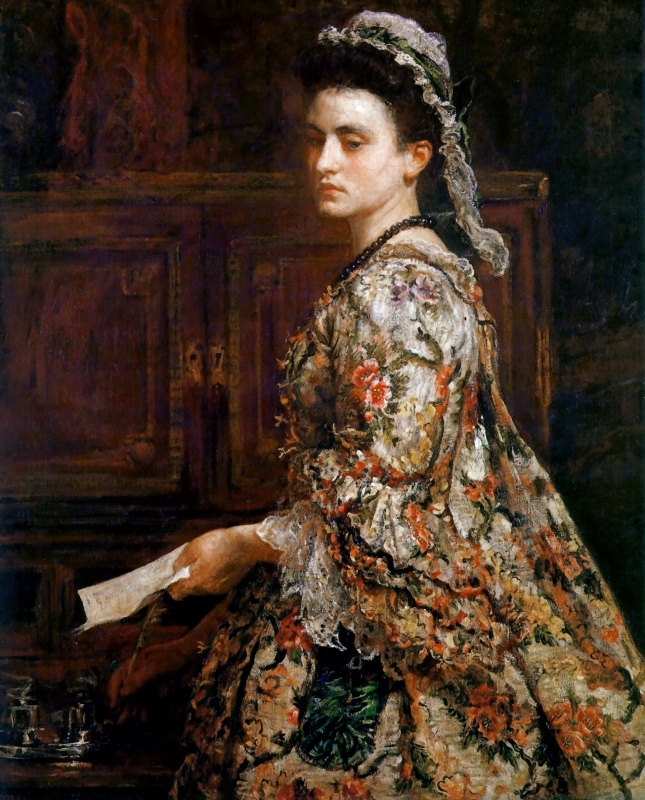
Vanessa - an imagined likeness painted in 1868 by John Everett Millais; no true likeness of her is known to survive.

In 1723 the intense friendship between Jonathan Swift and Esther Vanhomrigh, for whom he created the name Vanessa, ended in a violent quarrel about another woman whom he had loved for many years, Esther Johnson (whom he nicknamed "Stella"); Swift may secretly have married Stella in 1716, although the truth of this is now impossible to determine. The quarrel arose when Vanessa apparently asked Swift not to see Stella again, and he refused. Vanessa, who was seriously ill with tuberculosis and died a few months later, revoked the will she had made in Swift's favour and made a new will, dividing her estate between Marshall and George Berkeley, later to be a celebrated philosopher and Bishop of Cloyne, and appointing them as her joint executors. Her choice of legatee caused a good deal of surprise since it does not seem that she knew either man well (nor did they apparently know each other): indeed it has been suggested that she may never have met either of them. In the event much of the estate was dissipated in a lawsuit. There is a tradition that Marshall and Berkeley disobeyed a provision in the will that they publish all of Swift's correspondence with Vanessa, but in fact, no such provision seems to have existed. Marshall did preserve copies of the correspondence. Swift, though he had no quarrel with Berkeley, and indeed respected him, regarded Marshall (whom he called a "scoundrel"), as his enemy. Admittedly Swift had a notoriously poor opinion of lawyers in general.
