= Picturesque =

Aesthetic ideal

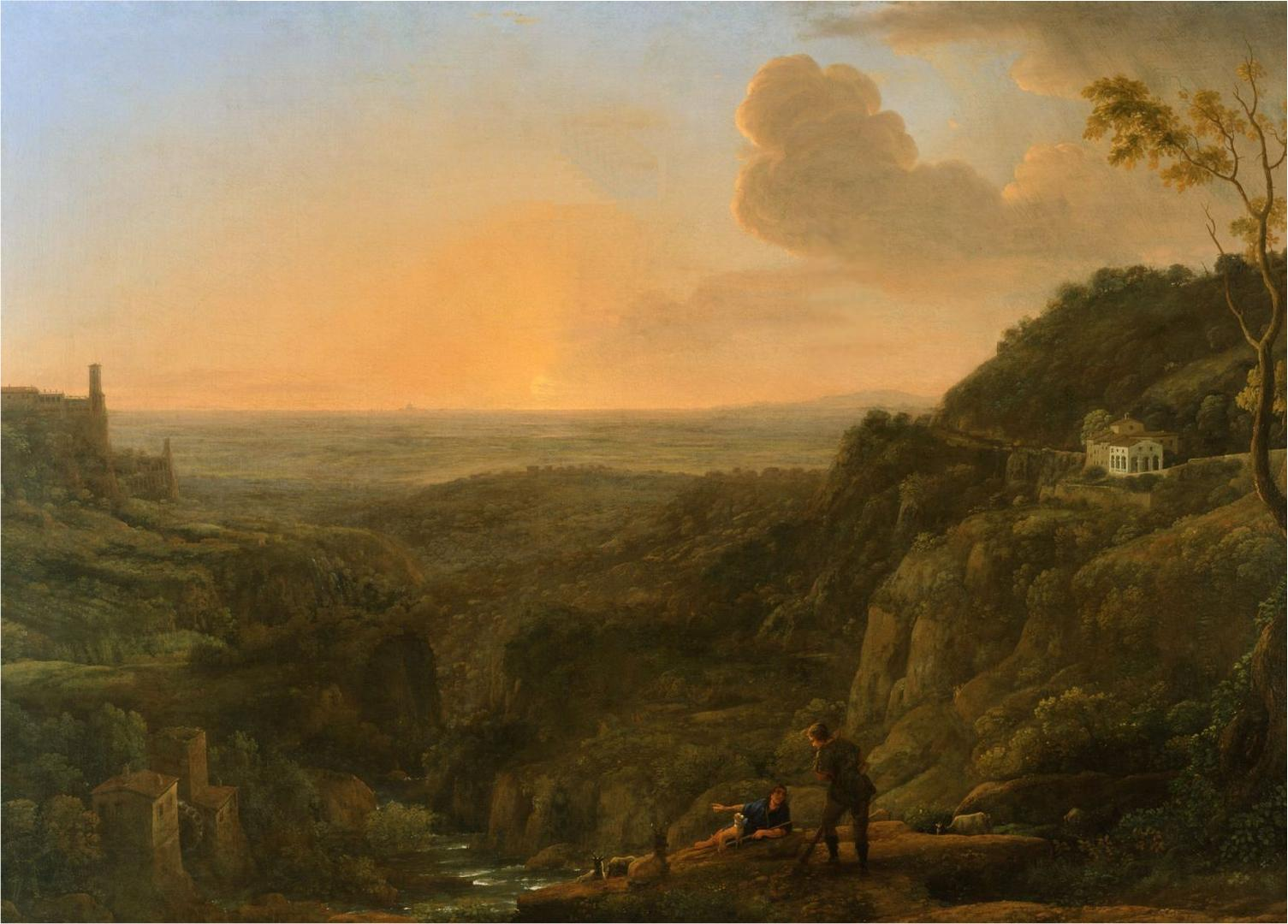
A view of the Roman Campagna from Tivoli, evening by Claude Lorrain, 1644–1645

Picturesque is an aesthetic ideal introduced into English cultural debate in 1782 by William Gilpin in Observations on the River Wye, and Several Parts of South Wales, etc. Relative Chiefly to Picturesque Beauty; made in the Summer of the Year 1770, a practical book which instructed England's leisured travellers to examine "the face of a country by the rules of picturesque beauty". Picturesque, along with the aesthetic and cultural strands of Gothic and Celticism, was a part of the emerging Romantic sensibility of the 18th century.

The term "picturesque" needs to be understood in relationship to two other aesthetic ideals: the beautiful and the sublime. By the last third of the 18th century, Enlightenment and rationalist ideas about aesthetics were being challenged by accounts of the experiences of beauty and sublimity that involved non-rational elements. Aesthetic experience was not just a simply deliberate, conscious rational decision based on principles of, e.g., symmetry, proportion, and harmony. It could come, for instance, more naturally as a matter of instinctual response involving the non-rational appetites. For instance, Edmund Burke in his 1757 A Philosophical Enquiry into the Origin of Our Ideas of the Sublime and Beautiful argued that the soft gentle curves appealed to the male sexual desire, while the sublime horrors appealed to our desires for self-preservation.

Picturesque arose as a mediator between these opposed ideals of beauty and the sublime, showing the possibilities that existed between these two rationally idealised states. As Thomas Gray wrote in 1765 of the Scottish Highlands: "The mountains are ecstatic […]. None but those monstrous creatures of God know how to join so much beauty with so much horror."

In its usual modern sense it merely means "pretty", with an implication of fitting conventional or old-fashioned tastes.

== Historical background and development ==
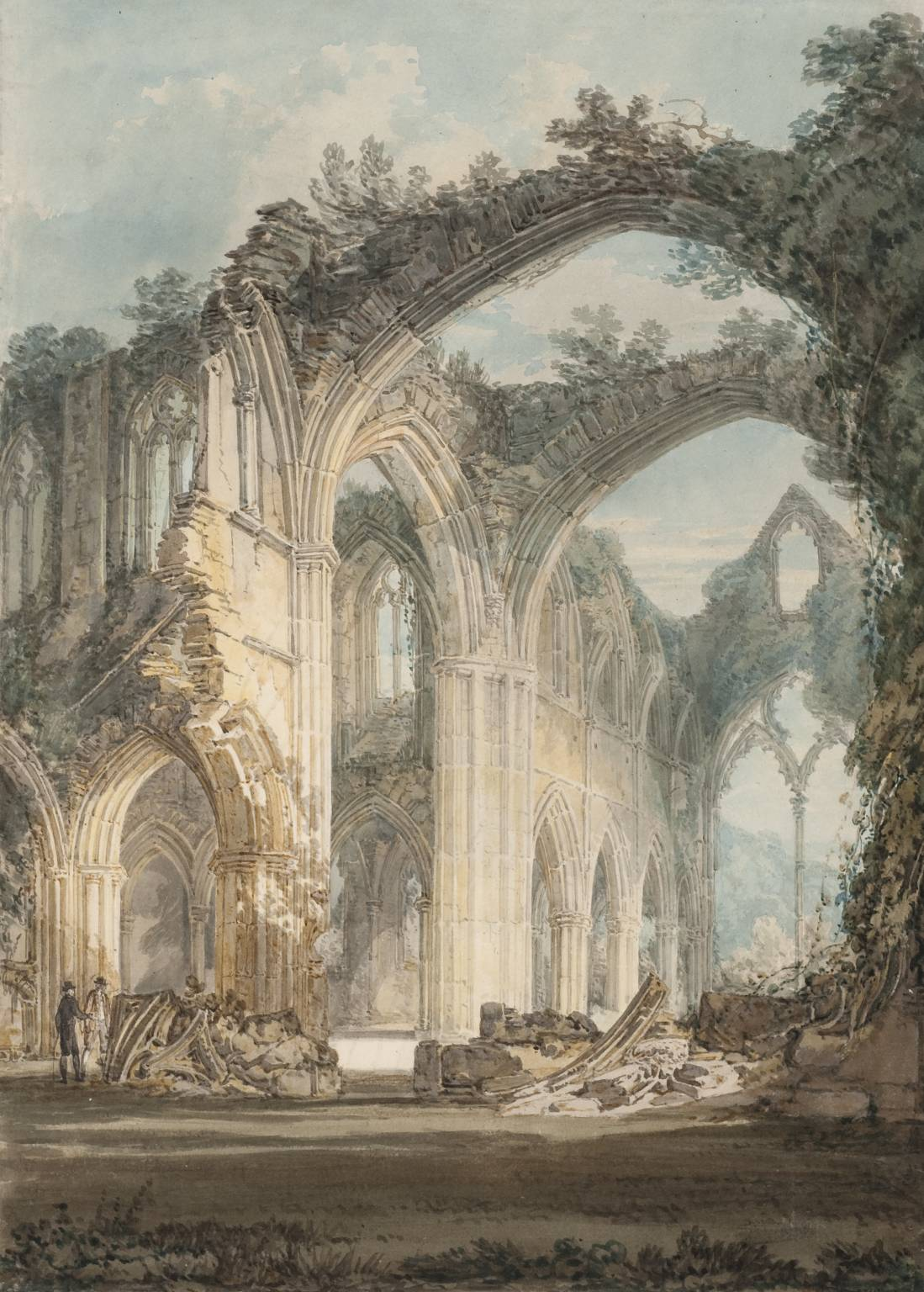
The Chancel and Crossing of Tintern Abbey, Looking towards the East Window by J. M. W. Turner, 1794

The picturesque as a topic in discourse came up in the late Renaissance in Italy where the term pittoresco began to be used in art writing as seen with Italian authors such as Vasari (1550), Lomazzo (1584), and Ridolfi (1648). The word is applied to the manner of depicting a subject in painting, roughly in the sense of "non-classical" or "painted non-academically" in a similar way as Dutch painters discussed developments in painting in the seventeenth century as "painter-like" (schilder-achtig). Highly instrumental in the establishing of a taste for the picturesque in northern Europe was landscape painting, in which the realism of the Dutch played a significant role. This cannot be seen separate from other developments in Europe.

Claude Lorrain (1604–1682) was a well-known French painter, who had developed landscape painting in Rome, like Poussin (1594–1665). Both painters worked in a somewhat stiff, mannered style, with a focus on archaeological remains and towering pine trees, followed by several Dutchmen who had also traveled to Rome. Soon, deviating from the classical ideal of perfection in beauty epitomized by healthy, towering trees, landscape painters came to discover the sublimity of the withered old tree; the two withered oaks by Jan van Goyen (1641) are a well-known example. For those who tried to find an answer to the classicism of French landscape painting, the lonely spruce at a wild cataract that caught the sublimity of nature became a recurring theme, most explicitly expressed by Jacob van Ruisdael. This painter painted picturesque garden scenes that can be seen as early representations of picturesque gardens in Europe. Similar landscape naturalism in English gardens emerged within cultural spheres around William and Mary from which the discussion on the picturesque in the English landscape took hold.

In England the word picturesque, meaning literally "in the manner of a picture; fit to be made into a picture," was a word used as early as 1703 (Oxford English Dictionary), and derived from French pittoresque and the Italian pittoresco. Gilpin's Essay on Prints (1768) defined picturesque as "a term expressive of that peculiar kind of beauty, which is agreeable in a picture" (p. xii).

The pictorial genre called "Picturesque" appeared in the 17th century and flourished in the 18th. As well as portraying beauty in the classical manner, eighteenth-century artists could overdo it from top to bottom. Their pre-Romantic sensitivity could aspire to the sublime or be pleased with the picturesque. According to Christopher Hussey, "While the outstanding qualities of the sublime were vastness and obscurity, and those of the beautiful smoothness and gentleness", the characteristics of the picturesque were "roughness and sudden variation joined to irregularity of form, colour, lighting, and even sound". The first option is the harmonic and classical (i. e. beauty); the second, the grandiose and terrifying (i. e. the sublime); and the third, the rustic, corresponding to the picturesque and connecting qualities of the first two options. This triple definition by Hussey, although modern, is true to the concept of the epoch, as Uvedale Price explained in 1794. The examples Price gave for these three aesthetic tendencies were Handel's music as the sublime, a pastorale by Arcangelo Corelli as the beautiful, and a painting of a Dutch landscape as the picturesque. A more brutal version is a quip by Sydney Smith: "The parson's horse is beautiful, the curate's horse is picturesque".

During the mid 18th century the idea of purely scenic pleasure touring began to take hold among the English leisured class. This new image disregarded the principles of symmetry and perfect proportions while focusing more on "accidental irregularity," and moving more towards a concept of individualism and rusticity. William Gilpin's work was a direct challenge to the ideology of the well established Grand Tour, showing how an exploration of rural Britain could compete with classically-oriented tours of the Continent. The irregular, anti-classical ruins became sought-after sights.

== Picturesque-hunters ==
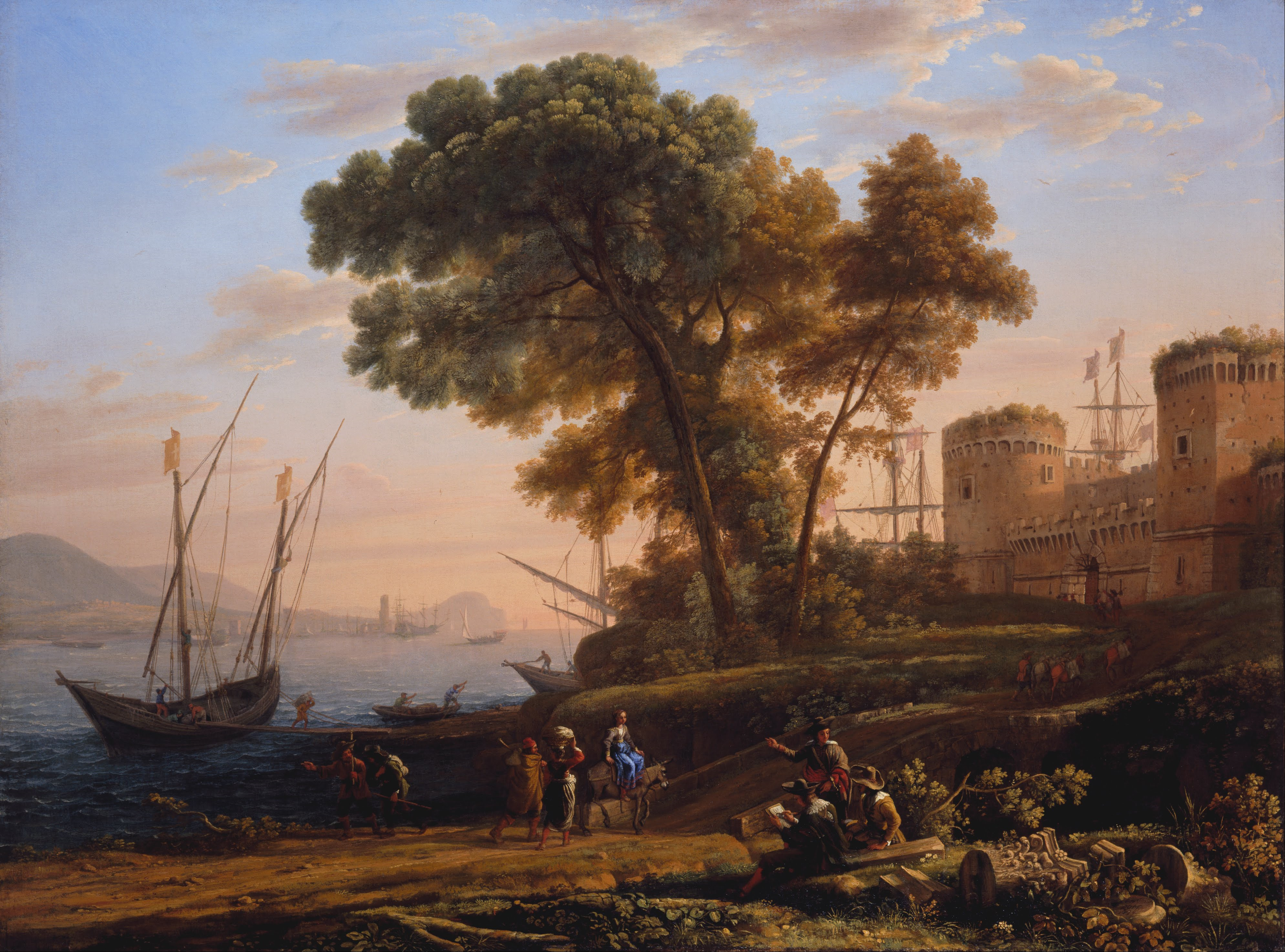
An Artist Studying from Nature by Claude Lorrain 1639

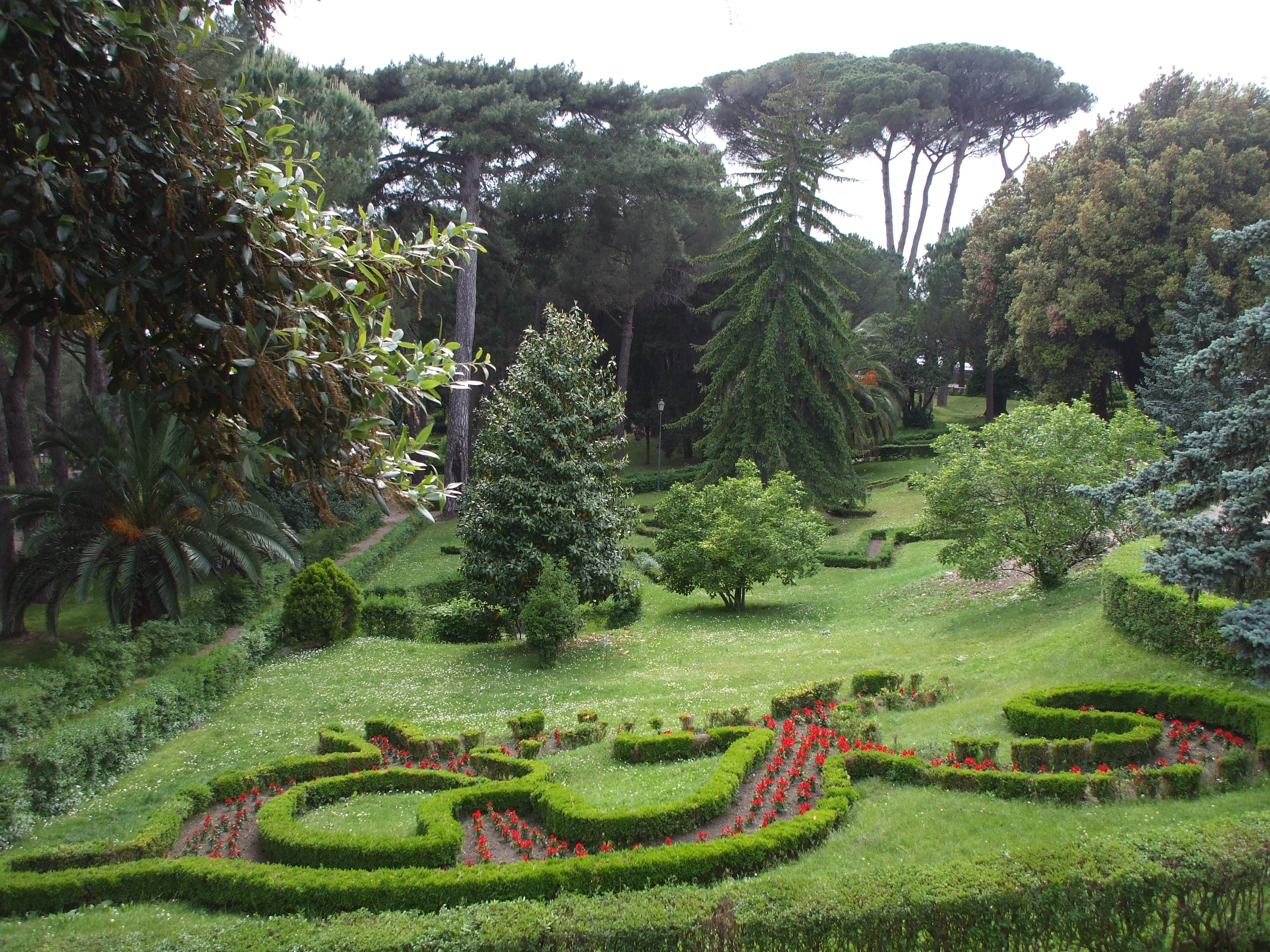
Villa Doria park in Albano Laziale

Picturesque-hunters began crowding the Lake District to make sketches using tinted portable mirrors to frame and darken the view, known as claude glass, and named after the 17th century landscape painter Claude Lorrain, whose work William Gilpin saw as synonymous with the picturesque and worthy of emulation. These new tourists had something of the big-game hunter about them and they boasted of their encounters with savage landscapes. Picturesque-hunters tried to "capture" wild scenes, and "fixed" them as pictorial trophies in order to sell them or hang them in frames on their drawing room walls. Gilpin asked: "shall we suppose it a greater pleasure to the sportsman to pursue a trivial animal, than it is to the man of taste to pursue the beauties of nature?"

Gilpin differentiated picturesque from the Edmund Burke category of the beautiful in the publication Three Essays: On Picturesque Beauty, on Picturesque Travel, and on Sketching Landscape. Gilpin expounded on his experience when traveling the landscape to search for picturesque nature.

In 1815 when Europe was available to travel again after the wars, new fields for picturesque-hunters opened in Italy. Anna Brownell Jameson wrote in 1820: "Had I never visited Italy, I think I should never have understood the word picturesque", while Henry James exclaimed in Albano in the 1870s: "I have talked of the picturesque all my life; now at last I see it".

== The Far East in the discourse on the picturesque ==
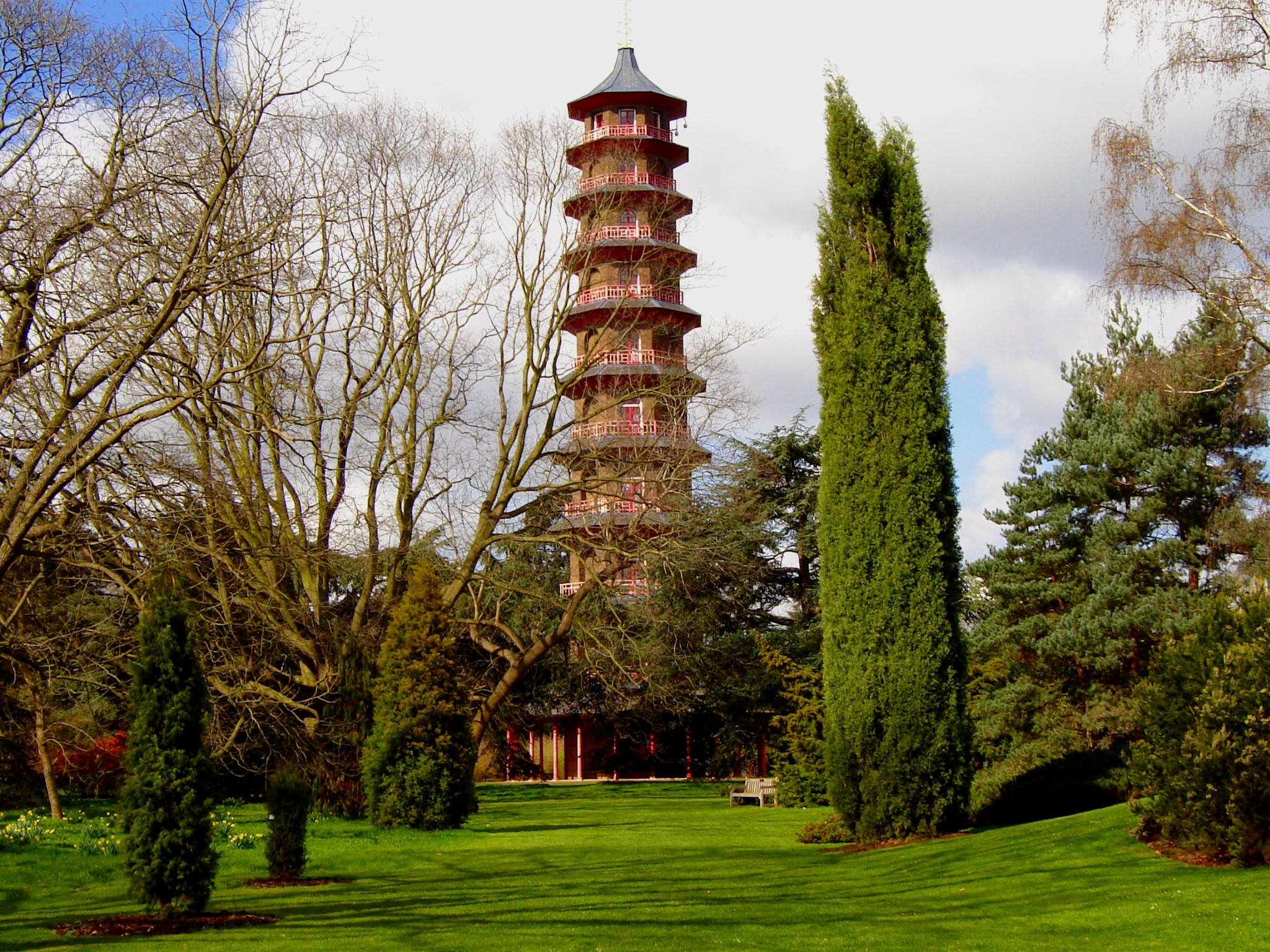
Kew Gardens, built by William Chambers 1761

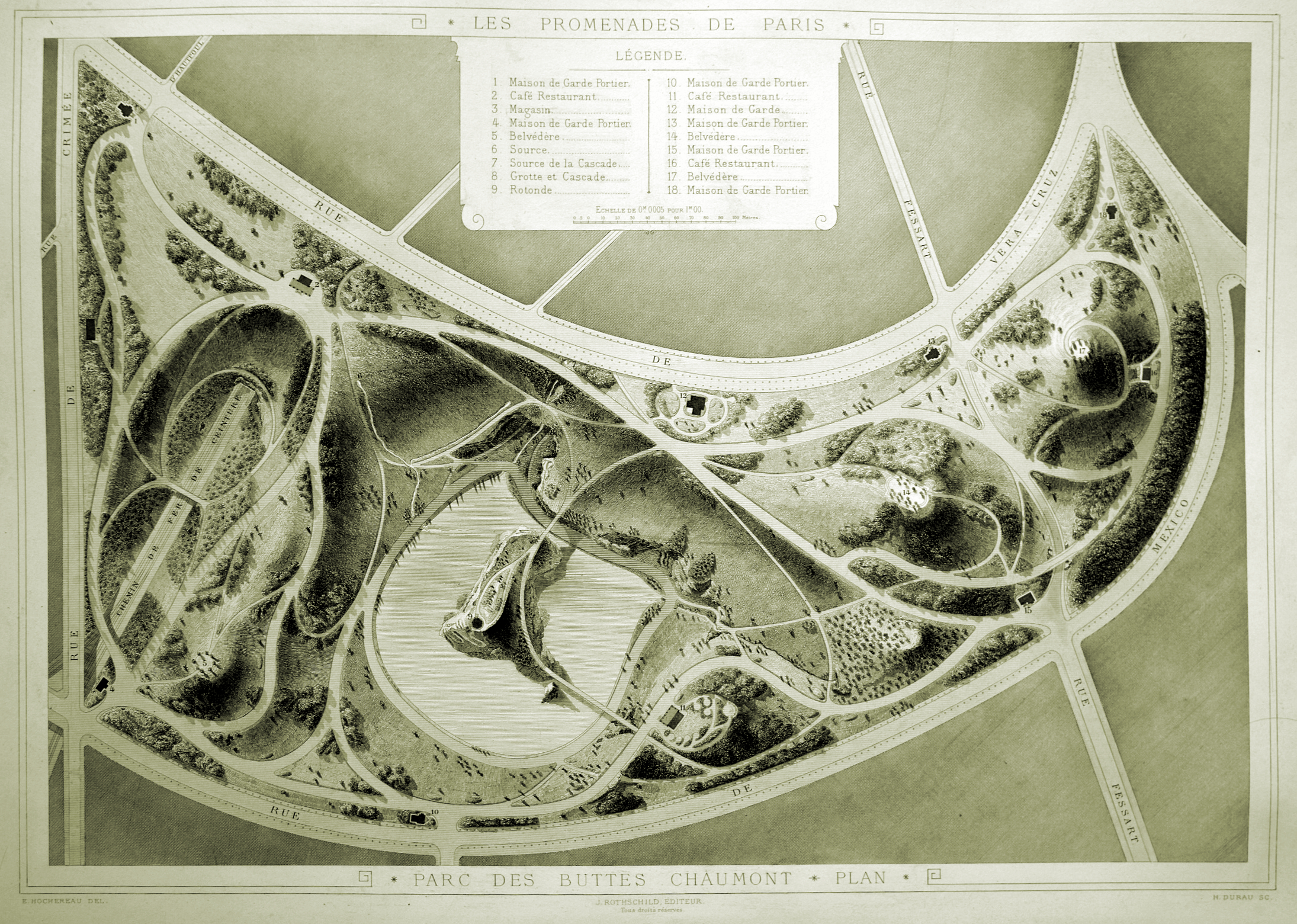
Map of Parc des Buttes Chaumont 1867, built according to plans by Adolphe Alphand

Though seemingly vague and far away, the Far East, China and Japan, played a considerable role in inspiring a taste for the picturesque. Sir William Temple (1628–1699) was a statesman and essayist who traveled throughout Europe. His essay Upon the Gardens of Epicurus; or Of Gardening, in the Year 1685 described what he called the taste of the "Chineses" [sic] for a beauty without order.

Among us [Europeans], the beauty of building and planting is placed chiefly in some certain proportions, symmetries, or uniformities; our walks and our trees ranged so as to answer one another, and at exact distances. The Chineses scorn this way of planting, and say, a boy, that can tell an hundred, may plant walks of trees in straight lines, and over-against one another, and to what length and extent he pleases. But their greatest reach of imagination is employed in contriving figures, where the beauty shall be great, and strike the eye, but without any order or disposition of parts that shall be commonly or easily observed: and, though we have hardly any notion of this sort of beauty, yet they have a particular word to express it, and, where they find it hit their eye at first sight, they say the sharawadgi is fine or is admirable, or any such expression of esteem. And whoever observes the work upon the best India gowns, or the painting upon their best screens or purcellans, will find their beauty is all of this kind (that is) without order. (1690: 58)

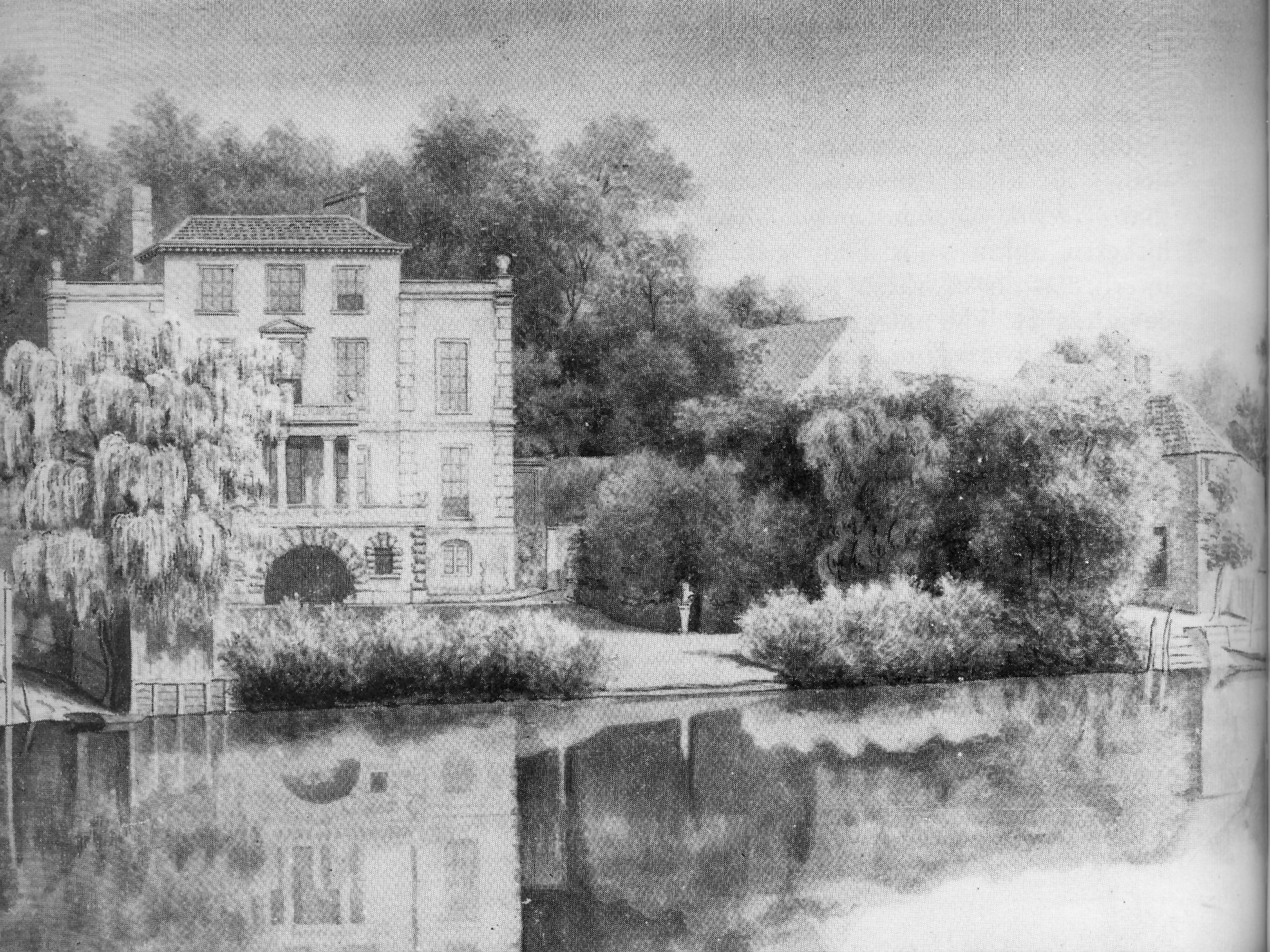
Pope's villa at Twickenham, showing the grotto, from a watercolour produced soon after Alexander Pope's death

Alexander Pope in a letter of 1724, refers to Temple's Far East: "For as to the hanging Gardens of Babylon, the Paradise of Cyrus, and the Sharawaggi's of China, I have little or no Idea's of 'em"; a few years later Horace Walpole mentions that "I am almost as fond of the Sharawaggi, or Chinese want of symmetry, in buildings, as in grounds or gardens" (1750). Imaginations of Far Eastern irregularity and sharawadgi returns frequently in the eighteenth and nineteenth century discourse.

Temple writes as though the Chinese term sharawadgi was a well-established one, but it is not, and there has been much scholarly wrangling over attempts to trace the etymology of sharawadgi to various Chinese and Japanese terms for garden design. Two Chinese authors suggested the Chinese expressions saluo guaizhi "quality of being impressive or surprising through careless or unorderly grace" (Chang 1930) and sanlan waizhi "space tastefully enlivened by disorder" (Ch'ien 1940). E. V. Gatenby (1931) proposed English sharawadgi derived from Japanese sorowaji (揃わじ) "not being regular", an older form of sorowazu (揃わず) "incomplete; unequal (in size); uneven; irregular". S. Lang and Nikolaus Pevsner (1949) dismissed these two unattested Chinese terms, doubted the Japanese sorowaji, and suggested that Temple coined the word "sharawadgi" himself. These authors placed Temple's discovery in the context of upcoming ideas on the picturesque. P. Quennell (1968) concurred that the term could not be traced to any Chinese word, and favored the Japanese etymology. Takau Shimada (1997) believed the irregular beauty that Temple admired was more likely characteristic of Japanese gardens, owing to the irregular topography upon which they were built, and compared the Japanese word sawarinai (触りない) "do not touch; leave things alone". Ciaran Murray (1998, 1999) reasons that Temple heard the word sharawadgi from Dutch travelers who had visited Japanese gardens, following the Oxford English Dictionary that enters Sharawadgi without direct definition, excepting a gloss under the Temple quotation. It notes the etymology is "Of unknown origin; Chinese scholars agree that it cannot belong to that language. Temple speaks as if he had himself heard it from travellers". Ciaran Murray emphasizes that Temple used "the Chineses" in blanket reference inclusive of all Oriental races during a time when the East-West dialogues and influences were quite fluid. He also wanted to see similarity between sharawadgi and a supposed southern Japanese Kyūshū dialect pronunciation shorowaji. Wybe Kuitert, a notable scholar of Japanese garden history placed sharawadgi conclusively in the discourse that was on in the circles around Constantijn Huygens a good friend of William Temple, tracing the term as the Japanese aesthetic share'aji (洒落味、しゃれ味) that belonged to applied arts – including garden design.

Temple misinterpreted wild irregularity, which he characterized as sharawadgi, to be happy circumstance instead of carefully manipulated garden design. His idea of highlighting natural imperfections and spatial inconsistencies was the inspiration for fashioning early 18th-century "Sharawadgi gardens" in England. The most famous example was William Kent's "Elysian field" at Stowe House built around 1738.

Temple's development of fashionable "sharawadgi" garden design was followed by Edmund Burke's 1757 A Philosophical Enquiry into the Origin of Our Ideas of the Sublime and Beautiful. Burke suggested a third category including those things which neither inspire awe with the sublime or pleasure with the beautiful. He called it "the picturesque" and qualified it to mean all that cannot fit into the two more rational states evoked by the other categories. A flurry of English authors beginning with William Gilpin and followed by Richard Payne Knight, Uvedale Price, and Humphrey Repton all called for promotion of the picturesque.

Gilpin wrote prolifically on the merits of touring the countryside of England. The naturally morose, craggy, pastoral, and untouched landscape of northern England and Scotland was a suitable endeavor for the rising middle classes, and Gilpin thought it almost patriotic to travel the homeland instead of the historically elite tour of the great European cities. One of the major commonalities of the picturesque style movement is the role of travel and its integration in designing one's home to enhance one's political and social standing. A simple description of the picturesque is the visual qualities of Nature suitable for a picture. However, Lockean philosophy had freed Nature from the ideal forms of allegory and classical pursuits, essentially embracing the imperfections in both landscapes and plants. In this way the idea progressed beyond the study of great landscape painters like Claude Deruet and Nicolas Poussin into experimentation with creating episodic, evocative, and contemplative landscapes in which elements were combined for their total effect as an individual picture.

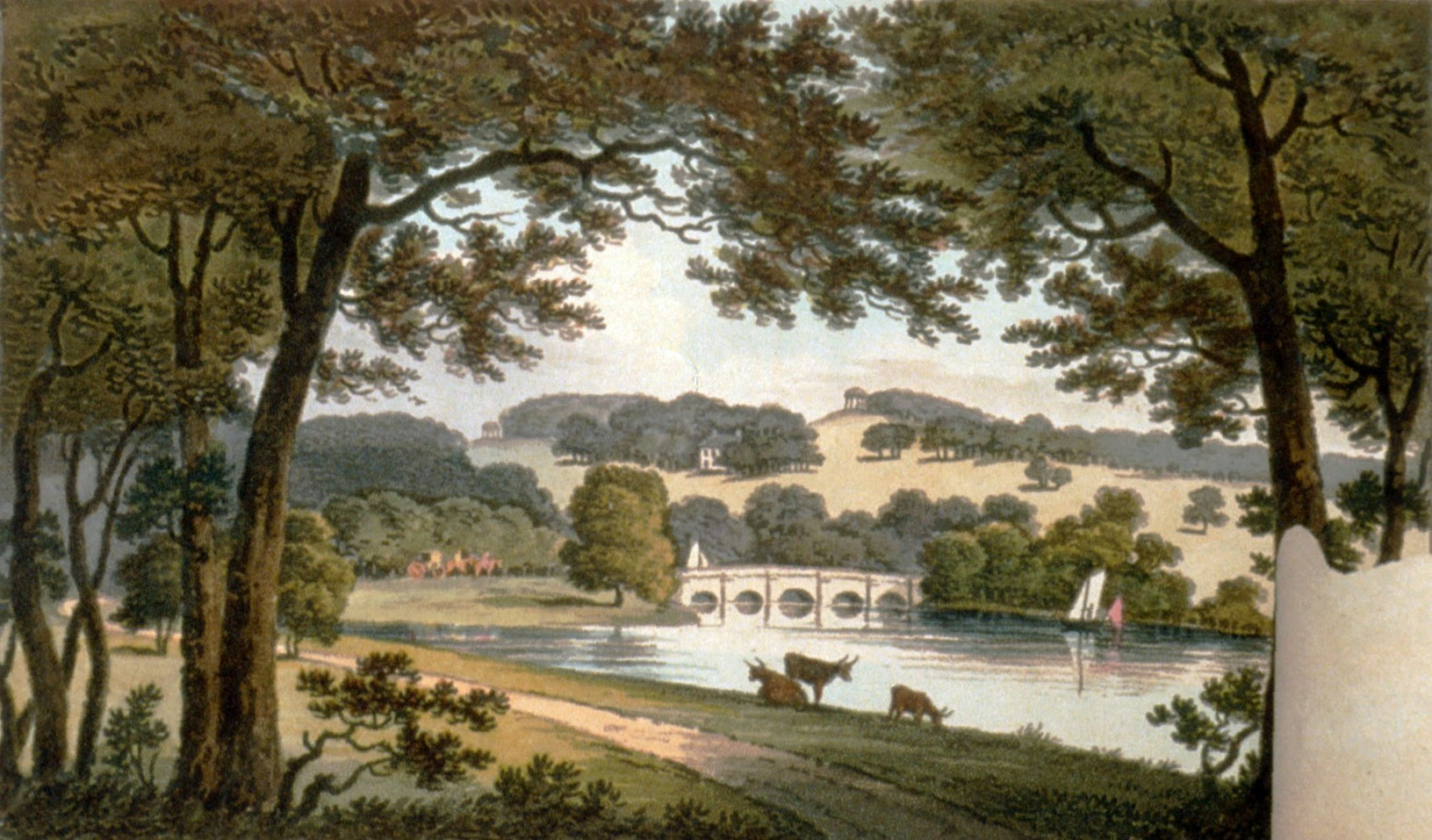
Illustration of Wentworth Woodhouse, South Yorkshire after proposed landscaping

The picturesque style in landscape gardening was a conscious manipulation of Nature to create foregrounds, middlegrounds, and backgrounds in a move to highlight a selection of provocative formal elements—in short the later appropriation of Humphrey Repton. It is unique that an idea on applied design (Sharawadgi) was diffused, which resulted in a typology of gardens that served as a precursor for the picturesque style. These aesthetic preferences were driven by nationalistic statements of incorporating goods and scenery from one's own country, framing mechanisms which dictate the overall experience, and a simultaneous embracing of irregular qualities while manipulating the "natural" scenery to promote them. The importance of this comparison lies in its location at the beginning of modernism and modernization, marking a period in which Nature was allowed to become less mathematically ordered but where intervention was still paramount but could be masked compositionally and just shortly after technologically as in Adolphe Alphand's Parc des Buttes Chaumont and Frederick Law Olmsted and Calvert Vaux's Central Park.

== Picturesque architecture ==
A drawing of Cullen's showing use of perspective

In the 1930s and 1940s the editor Hubert de Cronin Hastings used the Architectural Review in his attempt to popularize modern architecture in Britain. Authors who published in the Architectural Review include Paul Nash, John Piper, James Maude Richards, John Betjeman, Nikolaus Pevsner, and Gordon Cullen. Cronin Hastings combined the different landscape philosophies of surrealism, abstraction, neo-romanticism, and rationalism under the heading picturesque. Cronin Hastings advanced his urban planning philosophy as Townscape. In 1944 he published "Exterior Furnishing or Sharawaggi: The Art of Making Urban Landscap".

== Notable works ==
- William Gilpin, Three Essays: On Picturesque Beauty; On Picturesque Travel; and on Sketching Landscape: to which is Added a Poem, On Landscape Painting was published in London, 1792.
- Uvedale Price, An Essay on the Picturesque, as Compared with the Sublime and the Beautiful; and on the Use of Studying Pictures, for the Purpose of Improving Real Landscape, revised. edition London, 1796.
- Richard Payne Knight, An Analytical Inquiry into the Principles of Taste, (1805) soon followed, and went into several editions that the author revised and expanded.
- William Combe and Thomas Rowlandson published a poem with pictures called The Tour of Doctor Syntax in Search of the Picturesque (1809) which was a satire of the ideal and famously skewered Picturesque-hunters.
- Humphry Repton applied picturesque theory to the practice of landscape design. In conjunction with the work of Price and Knight, this led to the 'picturesque theory' that designed landscapes should be composed like landscape paintings with a foreground, a middle ground and a background. Repton believed that the foreground should be the realm of art (with formal geometry and ornamental planting), that the middleground should have a parkland character of the type created by Lancelot "Capability" Brown and that the background should have a wild and 'natural' character.
- John Ruskin identified the "picturesque" as a genuinely modern aesthetic category, in The Seven Lamps of Architecture.
- Dorothy Wordsworth wrote Recollections of a Tour Made in Scotland, A. D. 1803 (1874) considered a classic of picturesque travel writing.
- Christopher Hussey, The Picturesque: Studies in a Point of View, 1927 focused modern thinking on the development of the concept. The picturesque idea continues to have a profound influence on garden design and planting design.

== See also ==
- Landscape painting
- Sharawadgi
- Planting design
- Borrowed scenery
- Context theory
- John Dixon Hunt
- Wye Valley
- Thomas Johnes
- John P. Macarthur
