= Fancy portrait =

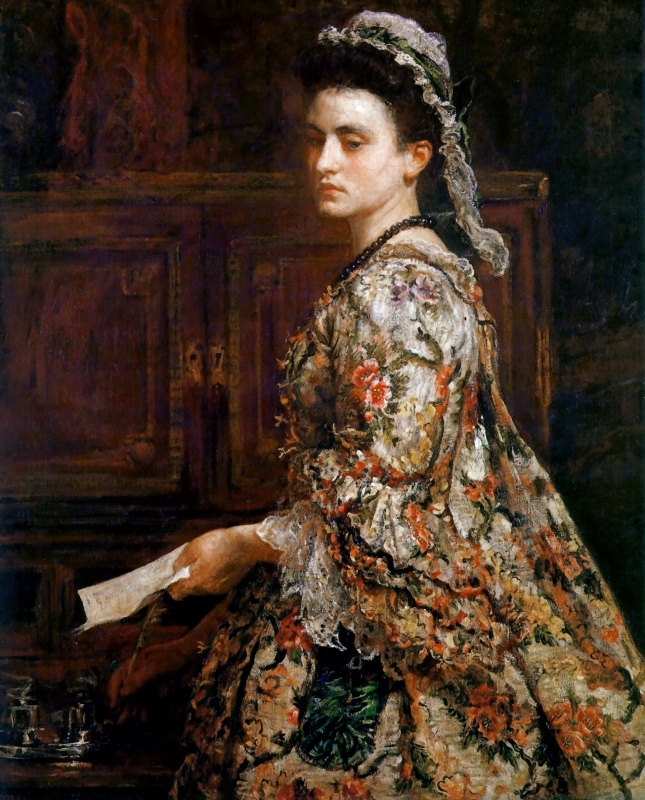
Vanessa, by Millais, 1868, Sudley House, Liverpool, a fancy portrait of Esther Vanhomrigh

A fancy portrait is a portrait of a real or literary character that takes the form of a conventional portrait, but is defined by the fact that its depiction of the character is derived from the artist's imagination rather than any authentic record of the person's appearance. In J. and H. L. Hunt's translation of Dictionnaire philosophique, Voltaire describes the fancy portrait as "a portrait not taken from any model".

Though portraits created from imagination of historical characters have existed since antiquity, the term came into use in the nineteenth century, when "portraits" of literary characters became popular, and were widely reproduced in the form of engravings. It was also applied commonly to humorous caricatures and later to photographs in which the subjects adopt imaginary personas.

== Conjectural portrait ==
A conjectural portrait is a portrait made of a historical figure for whom no authentic contemporary portrait is available. The depiction, then, may be variously informed by written accounts of physical appearance, conjecture based on the subject's culture and background, and/or the artist's conception of the subject's inner essence.

Certain conjectural portraits have become iconic of their subjects, and are widely recognizable as such, with few being aware that they are not authentic portraits. For example, portraits of Christopher Columbus and Joan of Arc are widely recognized.
