= Sharawadgi =

Style of landscape gardening or architecture

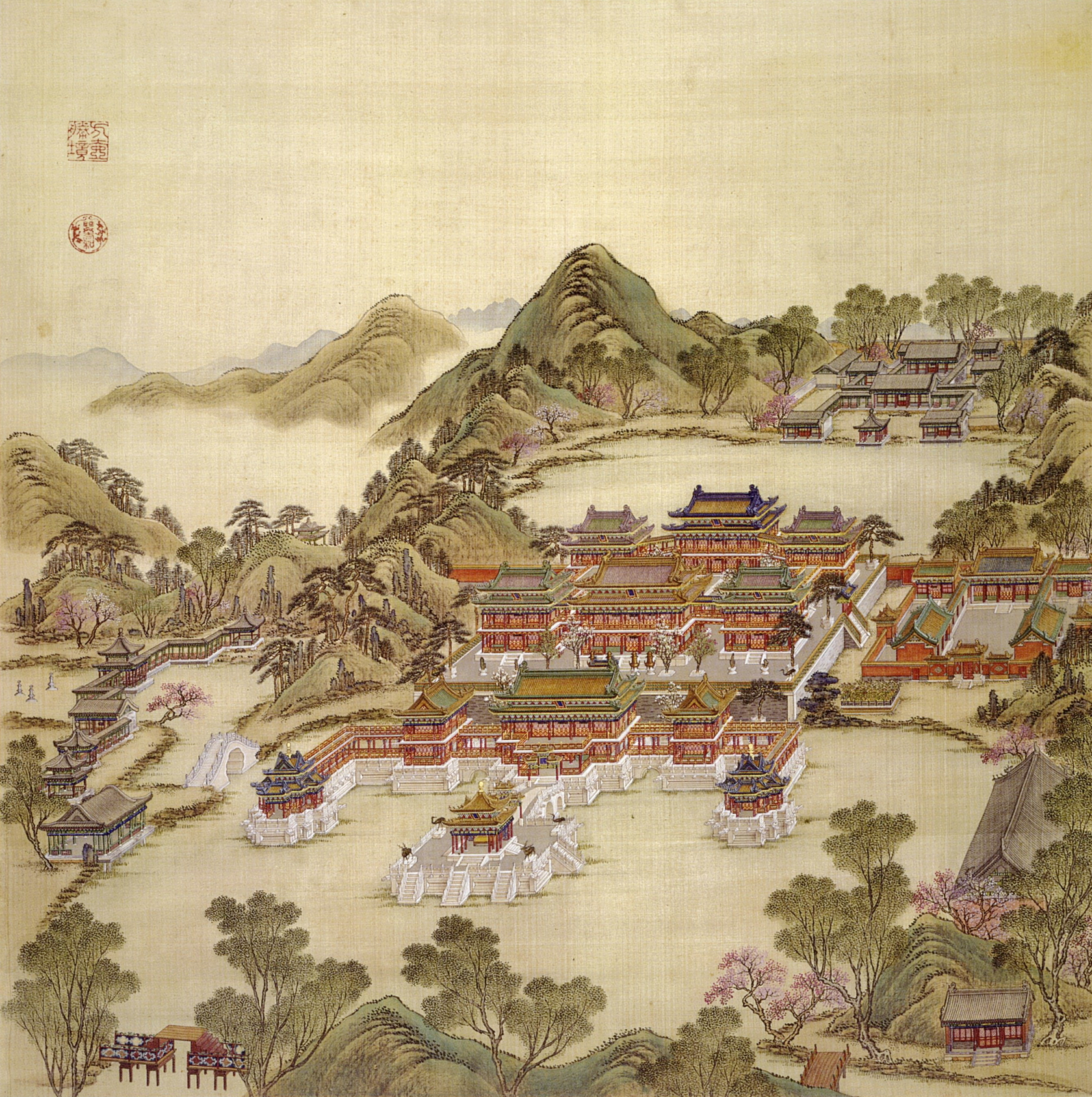
The Gardens of Perfect Brightness (yuan ming yuan) at the Old Summer Palace represented the naturalistic style which was reported by western visitors to China. From the late 17th century, this style was sometimes called sharawadgi in Europe.

Sharawadgi or sharawaggi is a style of landscape gardening or architecture in which rigid lines and symmetry are avoided to give the scene an organic, naturalistic appearance. This was supposedly a concept in the Chinese garden, and starting with Sir William Temple's essay Upon the gardens of Epicurus, may have been influential in English landscape gardening in the 18th century (Temple had in fact never visited China). The reports from China of the Jesuit missionary, Father Attiret added to this. Sir William Temple first used the word "sharawadgi" in discussing the Chinese idea of beauty without order in garden design, in contrast to the straight lines, regularity, and symmetries then popular in the formal Baroque gardens of Europe, led by the French formal garden. The style indicates a certain irregularity in the design.

The term seems in fact to derive from a version of a Japanese word, though much scholarly effort has been devoted to trying to find a Chinese origin for it. Irregular, non-geometric, planning is a strong feature of the design of many types of Chinese and indeed Japanese gardens, though less so in others, such as grand imperial palace gardens. Sharawadgi was defined in the 1980s as an "artful irregularity in garden design and, more recently, in town planning". The word inspired the coinage of the term "sharawadji effect" by composer Claude Schryer, which is used in relation to music and the listening experience.

== Etymology ==
The term "sharawadgi" (also spelled "sharawaggi") typically referred to the principle of planned naturalness of appearance in garden design. It was first used by Sir William Temple (1628–1699) in an essay, written in 1685 but published in 1692, "Upon the Gardens of Epicurus". Temple may have picked up the term from a Dutchman who once lived in the East Indies. Horace Walpole associates the term with irregularity, asymmetry, and freedom from the rigid conventions of classical design; by the time it was used by Walpole it had become a common term in the lexicon of eighteenth-century aesthetic theory.

However, the original word for sharawadgi has been a matter of debate. Some had attempted to reconstruct a possible Chinese origin of the word, for example, "sa luo gui qi" (洒落瑰琦) meaning "quality of being impressive or surprising through careless or unorderly grace", another proposed san luan (散亂) or shū luò (疏落), both meaning "scattered and disorderly", in combination with wei zhi (位置, position and arrangement) to mean "space tastefully enlivened by disorder". After reviewing the suggestions, however, Susi Lang and Nikolaus Pevsner concluded that the word cannot be firmly established to be a Chinese term. Michael Sullivan suggested that it is a corruption of a Persian word, while a number of other scholars proposed a Japanese origin. E.V. Gatenby and Ciaran Murray thought that it originated from the Japanese term sorowaji (揃わじ), which means asymmetry, irregular. However, it is argued that this suggestion relies on possible meaning and similarity in sound only, without any other corroboration. Garden scholar Wybe Kuitert proposed that it stems from the Japanese term shara'aji or share'aji (洒落味、しゃれ味) that may be used to describe decorative motifs in works of applied art. Although there is no attested usage of shara'aji in the Edo period when the term was first borrowed into English, Kuitert argued that both its components shara and aji were important aesthetic concepts in the era, and would have been used in tandem by craftsmen of the period. The term shara'aji would have then traveled together with such exports to customers, the aesthetic elite of Europe and became spelled in English as sharawadgi. In Japan the word has also been used a few times in literary criticism in later periods, and is still in common use in appreciating the aesthetics of motifs in kimono dress.

== History ==
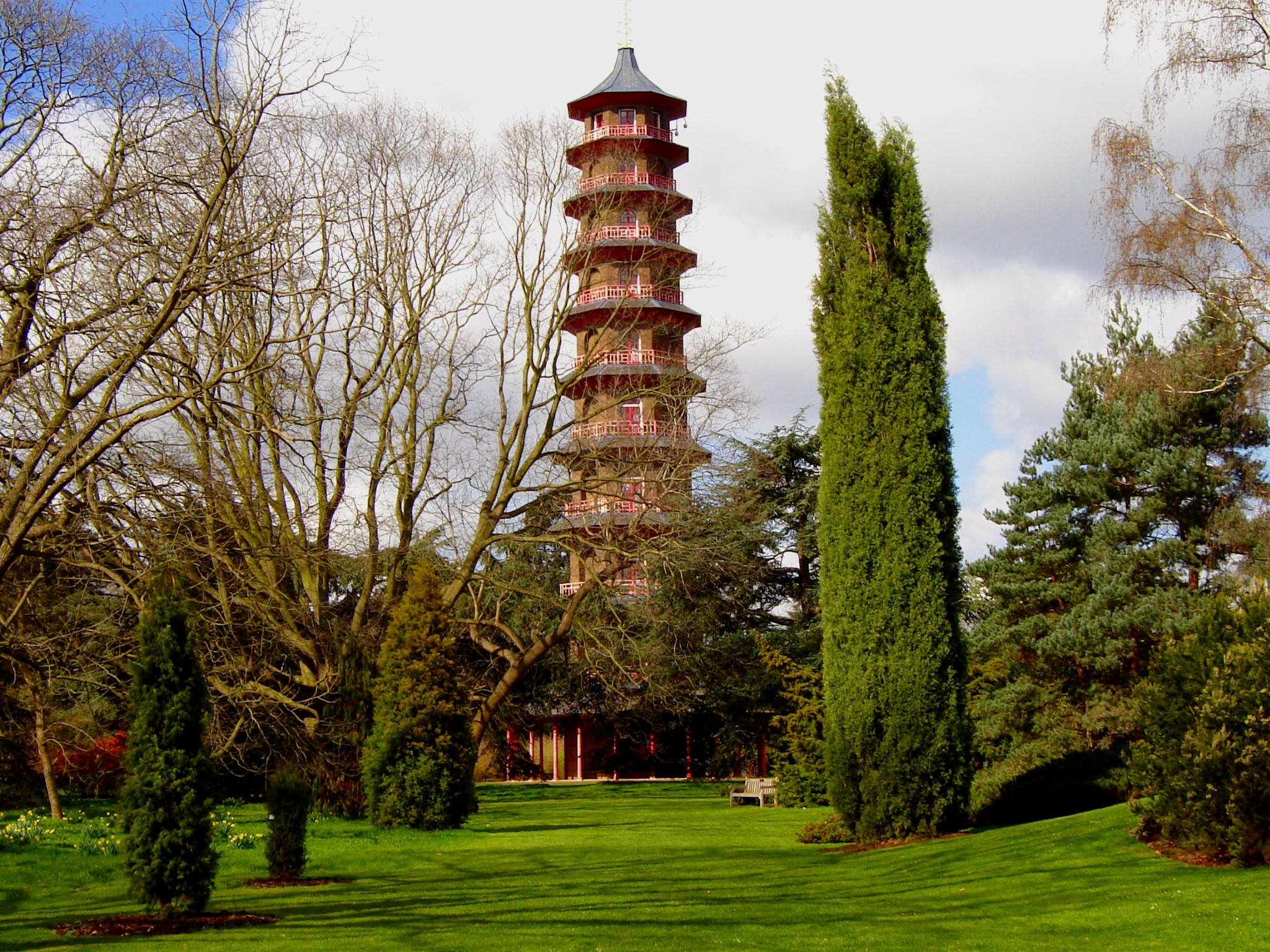
The Pagoda at Kew Gardens in London, built by Sir William Chambers in 1761. Chinese-style building in garden became popular together with the idea of sharawadgi in landscape gardening.

Merchants from the Dutch East India Company may have brought the term to Europe at the end of the seventeenth century together with Edo period Japanese lacquer ware such as cabinets and screens that they imported from Japan. Sharawadgi as a term in written discourse was introduced in England by Sir William Temple in his essay Upon the Gardens of Epicurus, (1685, first printed 1690). Temple had been English ambassador to The Hague.

Temple describes the concept of Sharawadgi in the following passage:

Amongst us, the Beauty of Building and Planting is placed chiefly in some Proportions, Symmetries and Uniformities; our Walks and our Trees ranged so, as to answer one another, and at exact Distances. The Chineses scorn this way of Planting, and say a Boy that can tell an Hundred, may plant Walks of Trees in strait Lines, and over-against one another, and to what Length and Extent he pleases. But their greatest reach of Imagination, is employed in contriving Figures, where the Beauty shall be great, and strike the Eye, but without any Order or Disposition of Parts, that shall be commonly or easily observ'd. And though we have hardly any Notion of this sort of Beauty, yet they have a particular word to express it; and where they find it hit their Eye at first Sight, they say the Sharawadgi is fine or is admirable, or any such Expression of Esteem. And whoever observes the Work upon the best Indian gowns, or the Painting on their best Skreens and Purcellans, will find their Beauty is all of this Kind, (that is) without Order. But I should hardly advise any of these Attempts in the Figure of Gardens among us; they are Adventures of too hard Atchievement for any common hands; and tho' there may be more Honour if they succeed well, yet there is more Dishonour if they fail, and 'tis Twenty to One they will; whereas in regular Figures, 'tis hard to make any great and remarkable Faults.

He took the exotic, non-symmetric landscapes depicted on such imported artwork as supporting his personal preference for irregular landscape scenery. He may have seen such irregularity in Dutch gardens where a discourse was on about naturalness in landscapes, planned or not. As a result of his introducing the term sharawadgi, Temple is considered to have been among those who introduced the basic ideas that led to the development of the English landscape garden movement.

Joseph Addison (1712), refers to Temple's essay but omits the actual word sharawadgi. In England the term reappears with Horace Walpole (1750), who quotes the passage from Temple. In the 20th century, the term Sharawadgi was first revived by the garden-designer Christopher Tunnard in an article in The Architectural Review of January 1938. It was picked up again by Nikolaus Pevsner, who brought sharawadgi to the field of town planning.

== Other meanings ==
The Sharawadji Effect in music

Inspired by the original idea of more organic, naturally-led garden landscaping, the Sharawadji Effect (spelled with a j rather than a g) has been employed in music, using more natural, ambient soundscapes to create richer, more encompassing, and more realistic "soundscapes". Information on the origins of the Sharawadji Effect in music is not widely accessible, but scholars seem to agree on the definition that sharawadji is "An aesthetic effect that characterizes the feeling of plenitude that is sometimes created by the contemplation of a sound motif or a complex soundscape of inexplicable beauty." When the Chinese visit a garden that is beautiful because of its organic quality (in other words, its apparent lack of organized design), it is often said that its 'sharawadji' is admirable. In the same fashion, a musical piece employs the Sharawadji Effect if it has a less clean-cut, structural quality and overall a more naturally ambient sound.

Kimono fashion

In modern Japan, share'aji is a term used in kimono fashion where it refers to the taste of the design motifs featured in kimono dress, and the coordination of the sash obi with that of the kimono, and to the occasion of wearing them.

== See also ==
- Chinoiserie
- English landscape garden
- Picturesque
