= Lady Elizabeth Germain =

English aristocrat and courtier

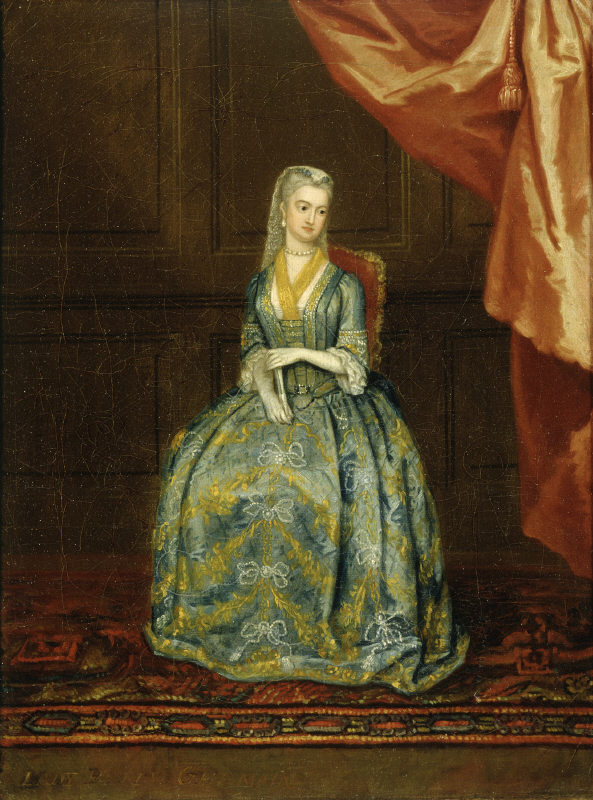
- Germain by Charles Philips, 1731
- Born: 1680
- Died: 16 December 1769 (aged 88–89)
- Spouse: Sir John Germain, 1st Baronet (m. 1706; died 1718)
- Issue: 2 sons and 1 daughter
- Father: Charles Berkeley, 2nd Earl of Berkeley
- Mother: Eliabeth Noel

Lady Elizabeth Germain (1680 – 16 December 1769) was a wealthy English aristocrat and courtier, a philanthropist and collector of antiquities, who corresponded with literary and political figures.

== Life ==
Lady Elizabeth "Betty" Germain, née Berkeley, was the second daughter of Charles Berkeley, 2nd Earl of Berkeley and his wife Elizabeth, daughter of Baptist Noel, 3rd Viscount Campden. In 1738, Sarah Churchill, Duchess of Marlborough wrote of her that "notwithstanding the great pride of the Berkeley family she married an innkeeper's son," and maliciously adds in explanation that "she was very ugly, without a portion, and in her youth had an unlucky accident with one of her father's servants." The so-called innkeeper's son was Sir John Germain, 1st Baronet (1650–1718), who was rumored to be the illegitimate son of William II, Prince of Orange and accordingly half-brother of King William III. Lady Betty met Germain at the Hot Wells, Bristol, and they were shortly thereafter married in October 1706. He was a recent widower, having first married Mary Mordaunt, Baroness Mordaunt, only child and heiress of the 2nd Earl of Peterborough, after her first husband, Henry Howard, 7th Duke of Norfolk had divorced her in 1700 over her love affair with Germain. Betty was thirty years younger than her husband, but her good sense made their union happy.

They had three children, two boys and a girl, all of whom died young, and in acknowledgment of her devotion in nursing them, Germain left her the estate of Drayton in Northamptonshire, and the vast property which he had inherited from his first wife, who had died childless. On his deathbed, he expressed the wish that she would marry a young man and have children to succeed to her wealth, but hoped that otherwise her fortune might pass to a younger son of Lionel Sackville, 1st Duke of Dorset, who had married Elizabeth, daughter of Lieutenant-general Walter Philip Colyear, Germain's friend and colleague in the Dutch service. Though almost persuaded in later years to marry Lord Sidney Beauclerk, a handsome and worthless fortune-hunter, she remained a widow for more than fifty years, and fulfilled her husband's wishes by leaving the estate of Drayton, with £20,000 in money and half the residue of her wealth, to the politician Lord George Sackville, the Duke's second son, who in turn assumed the name of Germain.

In 1730 she received a threatening anonymous letter left outside her London residence demanding £50 in return for her life. The Duke of Dorset showed the letter to the king, George II who ordered that Lady Betty was to have the protection of a file of musketeers.

Lady Betty passed most of her widowhood in her own apartments at Knole, near Sevenoaks in west Kent, the seat of her friends the Duke and Duchess of Dorset, or at her London town house in St. James's Square where she entertained politicians regardless of party or faction. She only occasionally visited Drayton House, which she retained in much the condition her husband left it. Originally built in the 14th century and expanded over the centuries, Drayton had been lavishly remodelled in the early 18th century following Baroness Mordaunt's marriage to Germain. After her death, he continued to devote considerable attention to the estate, including his formal Dutch gardens, which Lady Betty maintained as they had been in his lifetime.

She died at her town house on 16 December 1769. Her elder sister married Thomas Chamber of Ilanworth, Middlesex, and had two daughters, who, as their parents died young, were brought up entirely under Lady Betty's guardianship. The elder niece, Mary, married Vere Beauclerk, 1st Baron Vere. The younger, Anne, became the wife of Richard Grenville-Temple, 2nd Earl Temple, a close political associate of his brother-in-law, William Pitt (the Elder), 1st Earl of Chatham. Most of the balance of Lady Betty's estate was left to Lady Vere, and the disposition of her money is set out in a letter from Vere to Temple. She left £120,000 in the funds.

== Influence ==
Horace Walpole paid a visit to Drayton in 1763, and found the house "covered with portraits, crammed with old china". Many of her curiosities were sold after her death, by auction. The cameos and intaglios collected by Thomas Howard, 21st Earl of Arundel, were bequeathed to Germain by his first wife. Lady Betty offered the collection to the British Museum for £10,000, and, as the offer was declined, gave them in 1762 to her great-niece, Lady Mary Beauclerk, who married Lord Charles Spencer, son of the 3rd Duke of Marlborough. These gems were described in two folio volumes entitled Gemmarum antiquarum delectus quse in dactyliothecis Ducis Marlburiensis conservantur, 1781–90; the engravings were chiefly by Bartolozzi, and the Latin text by Jacob Bryant and William Cole (1753–1806). The gems were part of the Marlborough collection sold in 1875 for £36,750.

She is acknowledged to have "outlived the irregularities of her youth, and she was esteemed for her kindness and liberality." She gave £500 to the Foundling Hospital in 1746. Her politics were indicated by a present of £100 to John Wilkes during his imprisonment.

Jonathan Swift was chaplain to her father from 1699 to 1701, while the Earl of Berkeley was lord justice in Ireland, and Lady Betty and Swift continued their friendship during the various times he spent in England. She added a stanza to the dean's ballad on the game of traffic, written at Dublin Castle in 1699, which produced from him in August 1702 a second ballad "to the tune of the Cutpurse." Her name is often mentioned in the Journal to Stella, and as a vocal Whig, she often disputed with the dean on political topics. Many letters to and from her are included in Swift's Works and in the Suffolk Correspondence. Her spirited letter to Swift defending her friend Henrietta Howard, Countess of Suffolk (George II's mistress and Betty's future sister-in-law) against Swift's harsh censure is especially singled out as doing her "great honour". Though their correspondence appears to have ceased in 1737, she retained him in her affections, and a portrait of Swift still hangs in her rooms at Knole. Edward Young dedicated to Lady Betty his sixth satire on women, and according to a correspondent in Nichols's Literary Anecdotes, she was credited with having written a satire on Alexander Pope. The manuscripts at Drayton, which include communications to and from Lady Betty, are described in the Historical Manuscripts Commission's report on the MSS of Mrs Stopford Sackville of Drayton House.

A brass plaque commemorating her is found at St Peter's Church, Lowick, near to Sir John Germain's tomb.

== Bibliography ==
- Murdoch, Tessa (ed.), Noble Households: Eighteenth-Century Inventories of Great English Houses (Cambridge, John Adamson, 2006) ISBN 978-0-9524322-5-8 OCLC 78044620. For inventories of Elizabeth Germain's goods and chattels at Drayton House, Northamptonshire, in 1710, see pp. 121–30; in 1724, see pp. 131–40.

Attribution

This article incorporates text from a publication now in the public domain: "Germain, Elizabeth". Dictionary of National Biography. London: Smith, Elder & Co. 1885–1900.
