= Richard Phillips (English painter) =

English painter

- Born: 1681; London, England
- Died: 1741 (aged 59–60); London, England

Richard Phillips or Philips (1681–1741) was a British portrait painter.

Phillips was born in London. His portrait of Edmond Halley (1656-1742) hangs in the National Portrait Gallery, and his portrait of William Lowndes (1652-1724) hangs in the Bank of England.

He also painted John Bennet, 1st Baron Ossulston (1616-1698), Elizabeth Cromwell (1650-1731) Oliver Cromwell’s granddaughter (the daughter of Richard Cromwell and Dorothy Mayor), and Sir Thomas Palmer, 4th Baronet, of Wingham (1682-1723)). Mezzotints and engravings after him of Daniel Waterland (1683-1740), Bishop Thomas Wilson (1663-1755), and Mrs Mary Anne Granville are also in the National Portrait Gallery.

He was the father of the painter Charles Philips (c.1703-1748) who became a Rembrandt follower. He had a more prestigious client list than his father.

Phillips died in London.
