= A Journal to Stella =

1710–1713 letters by Jonathan Swift

A Journal to Stella is a work by Jonathan Swift first partly published posthumously in 1766. It is a collection of letters that Swift wrote for Esther Johnson, his close friend and secret wife.

== Composition and dating ==
It consists of 65 letters to his friend, Esther Johnson, whom he called Stella and whom he may have secretly married. They were written between 1710 and 1713, from various locations in England. Though clearly intended for Stella's eyes, the letters were sometimes addressed to her companion Rebecca Dingley.

== Persons mentioned in the letters ==
Amongst the references to contemporaries of Dean Swift, frequent mention is made of Lady Elizabeth Germain. There is also mention of St. George Ashe, Bishop of Clogher, an old friend who by some accounts secretly married Swift to Stella in 1716.
