= Charles Philips (artist) =

English painter

- Born: c.1703 London, England
- Died: 1747; London, England
- Known for: Portrait painter
- Spouse: Mary Francis

Charles Philips (c.1703–1747) was an English artist known for painting a number of portraits and conversation pieces for noble and Royal patrons in the mid-eighteenth century.

== Biography ==
Philips was baptised in the combined parish of St Mildred, Poultry with St Mary Colechurch. He was the son of Richard Philips, also a portraitist. He married Mary Francis in 1737 and moved to Great Queen Street shortly afterwards. Philips died in London in 1747 only six years after his father.

== Career ==
As the son of a portraitist, Philips likely learnt the trade from his father. He was primarily a painter of small portraits and conversation pieces. George Vertue notes that 'in painting small figure portraits & conversations [which] has met with great encouragement amongst People of Fashion—even some of ye Royal Family'. In 1732 he painted conversation works for the Duchess of Portland and the Duke of Somerset. Throughout the 1730s these conversation pieces increased in complexity with the subjects becoming more numerous and engaging in more varied activities.

Following the example set by fellow painters of small scale conversation pieces such as Philippe Mercier and William Hogarth, Philips moved into the more lucrative field of portrait painting in the latter part of the decade. In 1737 he reached the height of his career when he painted the Prince and Princess of Wales in a pair of full-length portraits. The Prince of Wales was a well known patron of the arts and especially of immigrant artists. This included Jacopo Amigoni and Mercier, principal influences on Philips.

Two of Philips' paintings, now in the Royal Collection, describe fashionable London clubs of which there are no other records. The first, dated 1732, shows Frederick, Prince of Wales with members of 'La Table Ronde', and once hung at Carlton House. The painting casts the Prince as a new King Arthur, with his knights seated around the round table. The other painting, notes in a description of 1813 that "Frederick Prince of Wales Established a Club — Called the Gang or Harry The Fifth’s Club — the members of which were Call’d Fallstaffs Points — Bardolph &c", apparently alluding to Shakespeare's portrayal of Henry V and his rowdy entourage.

The known body of his work can be dated entirely to the 1730s, with little known of his later life or any later work. The last known portrait painted by Philips dates from 1740. It is not known why Philips's output apparently ended abruptly.

== Works ==
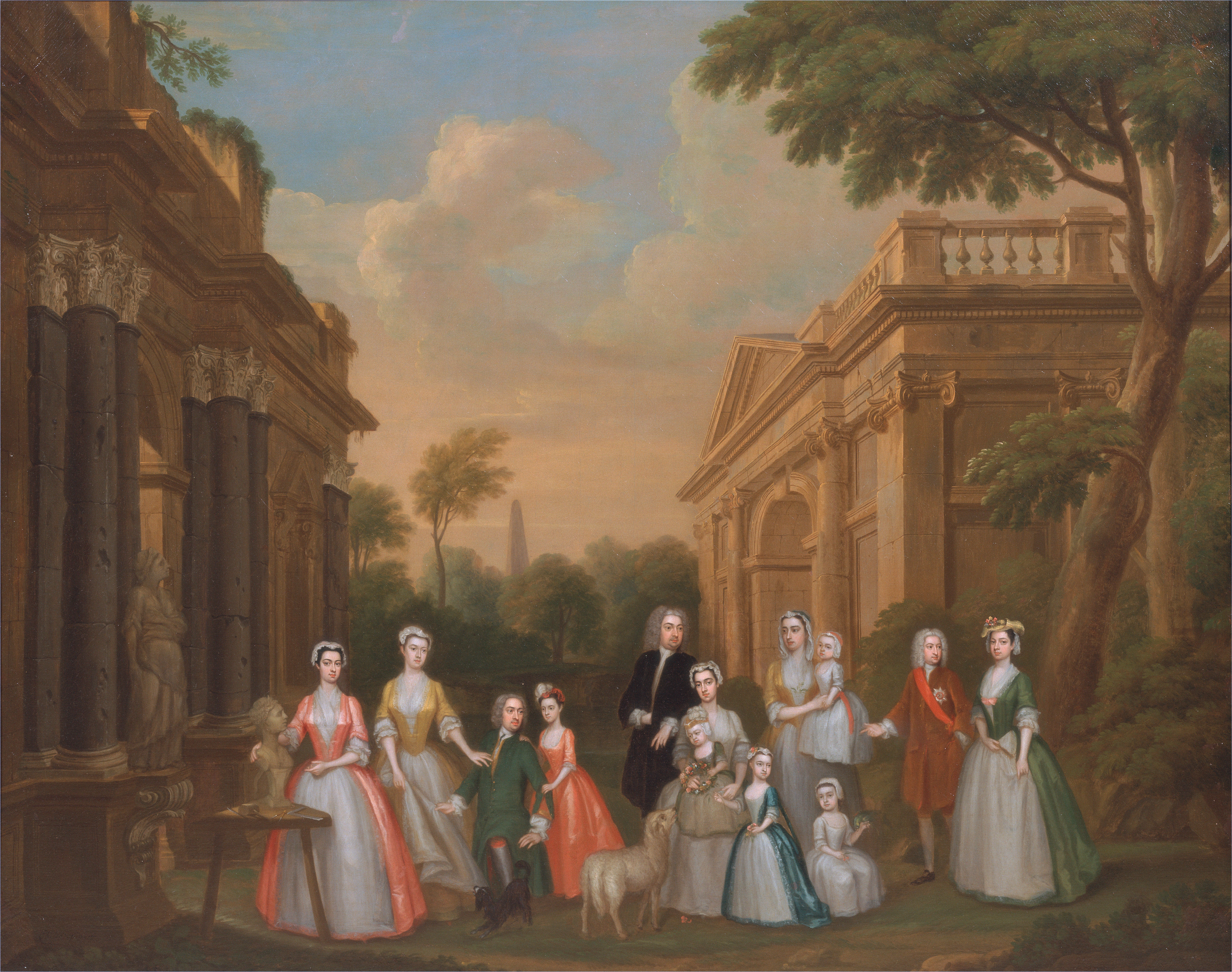
The Watson-Wentworth and Finch Families, c.1732

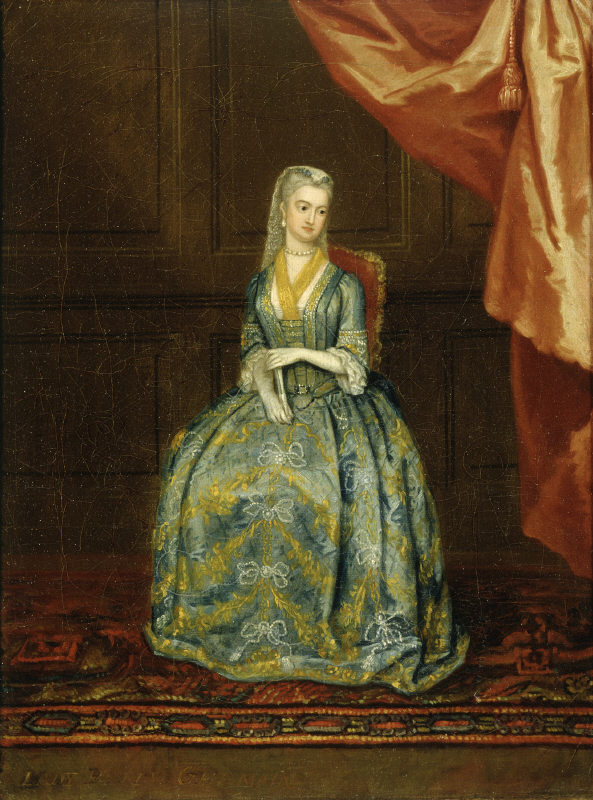
Lady Betty Germain, 1731

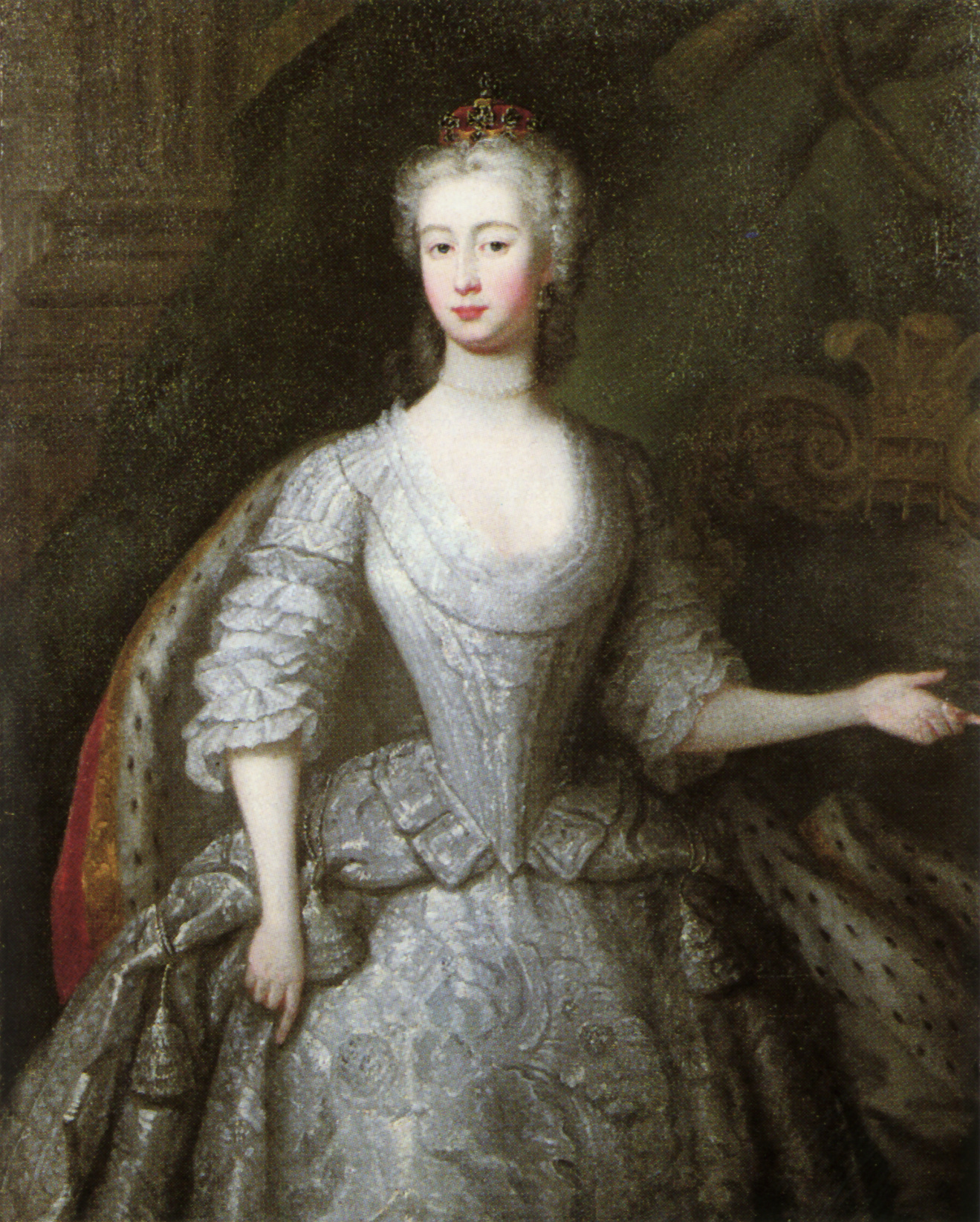
Princess Augusta of Saxe-Gotha, 1737

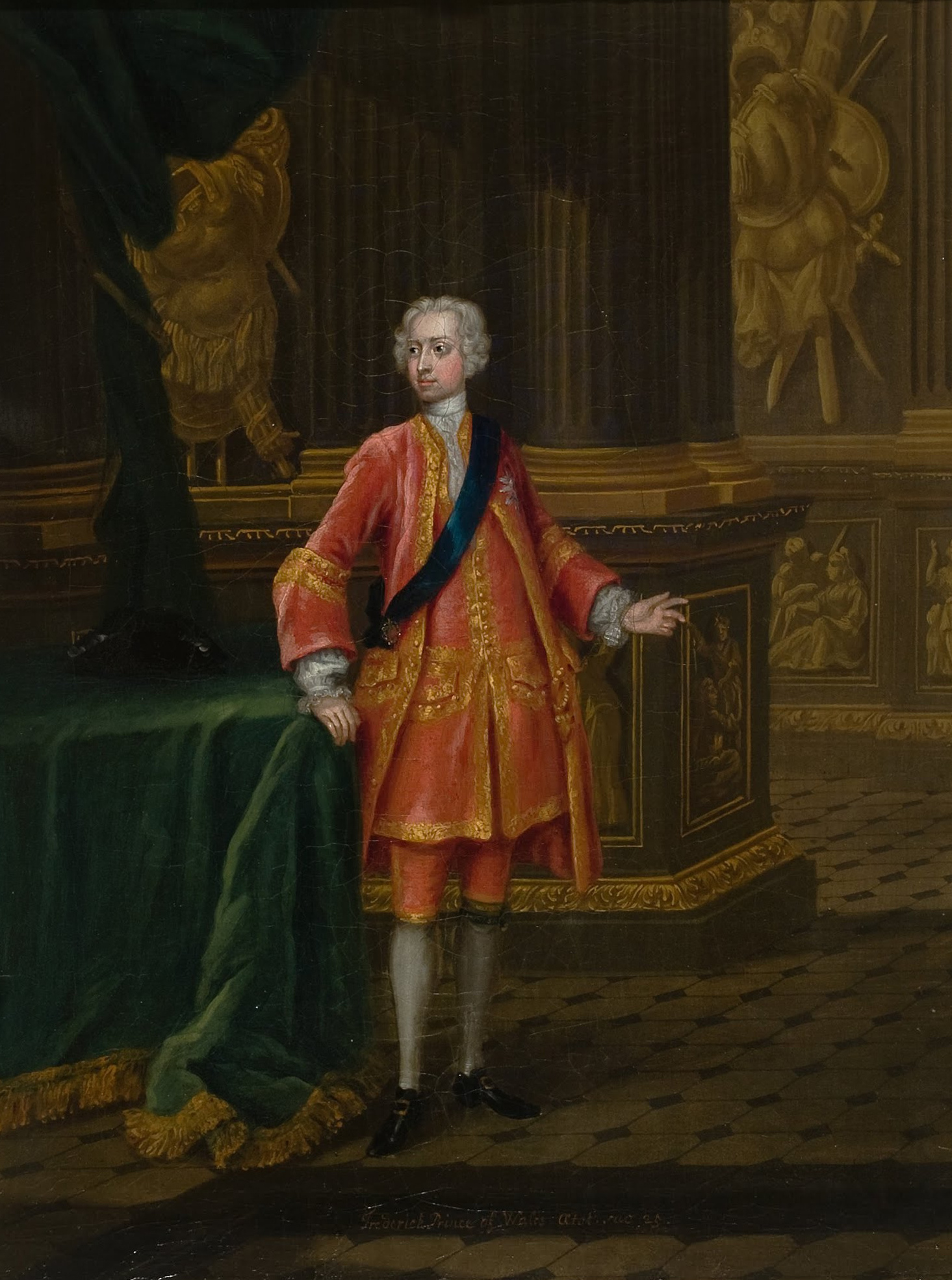
Frederick, Prince of Wales, 1737

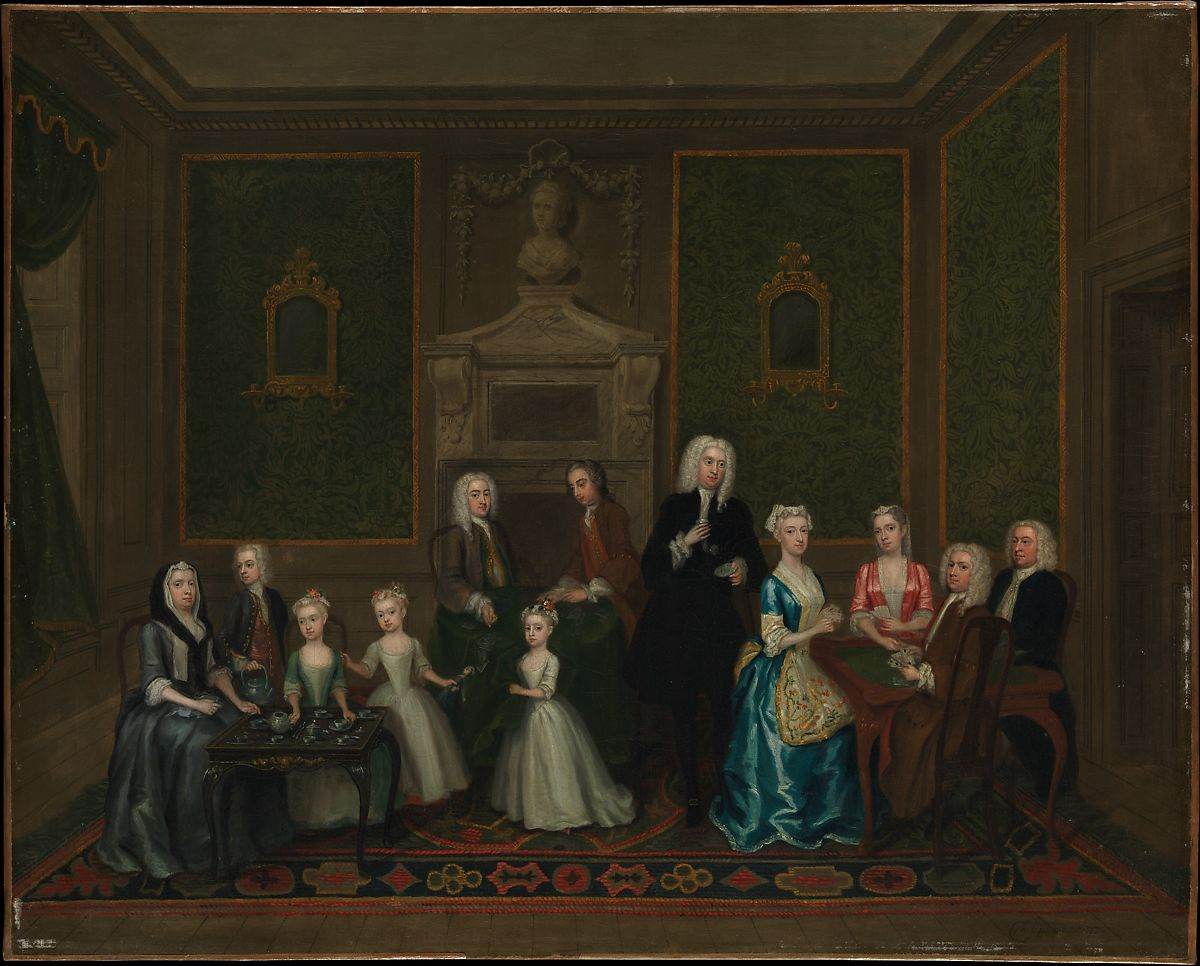
The Strong Family, 1732
