= Martha Giffard =

English letter writer and biographer

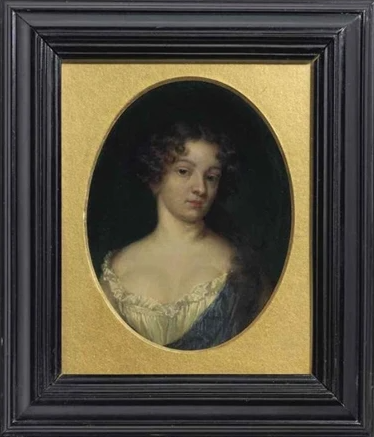
- Born: Martha Temple; 1638
- Died: 1722 (aged 83–84)
- Known for: accusing Jonathon Swift of plagiarism and supporting her brother's diplomacy
- Spouse: Sir Thomas Giffard

Martha, Lady Giffard born Martha Temple (1639–1722) was an English letter writer and biographer. She was at her brother's side as he brought about the Triple Alliance in 1668 bringing peace to England and its neighbours.

== Life ==
Giffard was born in 1638. Her parents were John Temple and Mary (daughter of Dr. John Hammond, of Chertsey, Surrey) and her mother died the year she was born. She had two elder brothers who survived childhood, William and John. She had an at home education.

In February 1654 she was in Ireland with her brother William in Dublin. This was the year that he would marry for love to Dorothy Osborne on Christmas Day. The marriage would last until 1695.

On 21 April 1662 she married a royalist Sir Thomas Giffard, baronet of Castlejordan, County Meath who was a relation of Lord Halsbury. It was a short marriage as he died of natural causes on 4 May of the same year. She would not marry again and she was known for controlling her passion, although she was exchanging letters with the diplomat and potential suitor Sir William Godolphin. She was involved with Royalist politics as she travelled with her brother, William. They living in Brussels in 1667 and he sent his family home. She understood languages and she travelled with him to diplomatic meetings in Amsterdam and The Hague leading up to the 1668 Treaty of Aix-la-Chapelle and the end of her letters to Godolphin. The treaty was underwritten by the Triple Alliance, that her brother took the credit for, ending a war and bringing England peace with its neighbours.

== Death and legacy ==
In 1722, she died and she left money to Esther Johnson and Jonathon Swift's sister Mrs Fenton who had been her companion in 1711.

Her biography of her brother, The life and character of Sir William Temple, Bart., was published in 1728 with the author named as "a particular friend".
