= Gifford baronets =

Extinct baronetcy in the Baronetage of England

There have been two baronetcies created for persons with the surname Gifford, one in the Baronetage of England and one in the Baronetage of Ireland. Both creations are extinct.

The Gifford Baronetcy, of Burstall in the County of Leicester, was created in the Baronetage of England on 21 November 1660 for Henry Gifford. The title became extinct on the death of the second Baronet in 1736.

The Gifford Baronetcy, of Castle Jordan in County Meath, was created in the Baronetage of Ireland on 4 March 1661 for Thomas Gifford. The title became extinct on his death in 1662. However, he had male heirs and Castle Jordan remained in the Gifford family until the nineteenth century.

== Gifford baronets, of Burstall (1660) ==
- Sir Henry Gifford, 1st Baronet (died c. 1665)
- Sir John Gifford, 2nd Baronet (died 1736)

== Gifford baronets, of Castle Jordan (1661) ==
- Sir Thomas Gifford, 1st Baronet. He died in 1662 leaving Martha, Lady Giffard as his widow.
