= Sir William Temple, 1st Baronet =

English diplomat, politician and writer

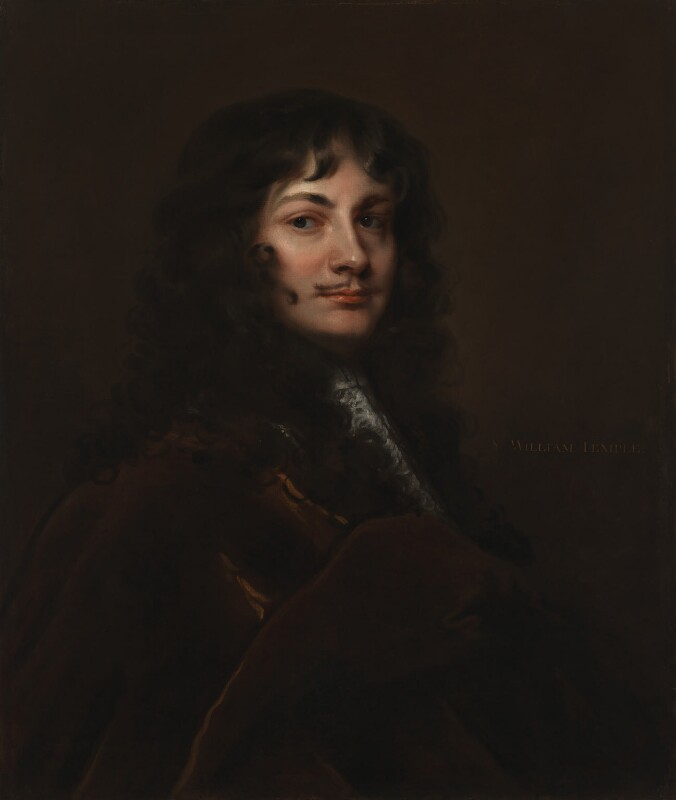
A portrait of Temple (1660)

Sir William Temple, 1st Baronet (25 April 1628 – 27 January 1699) was an English diplomat, politician and writer. An important diplomat, he was recalled in 1679, and for a brief period was a leading advisor to Charles II of England, with whom he then fell out. Temple subsequently retired to the countryside, and thereafter occupied himself with gardening and writing. He is best remembered today for two aspects of his life after retirement: a passage on the designs of Chinese gardens, written without ever having seen one, and for employing a young Jonathan Swift as his secretary. The first is sometimes given as an early indication of the English landscape garden style, praising irregularity in design.

== Biography ==
Escutcheon of the Temple baronets of Sheen

William Temple was the son of Sir John Temple of Dublin, an Irish judge and Master of the Rolls. Born in London, and educated at Emmanuel College, Cambridge, Temple travelled across Europe, and was for some time a member of the Irish Parliament. He was a representative at the Irish Convention of 1660 and was also employed on various diplomatic missions. During his time as a diplomat, Temple successfully negotiated the Triple Alliance of 1668 and the marriage of the Prince of Orange and Princess Mary of England in 1677. On his return in 1679 he was much consulted by Charles II, but disapproving of the anti-Dutch courses adopted, retired to his house at Sheen.

He was called out of retirement to implement a plan of his design to reform government rule. He was the architect of the Privy Council Ministry of 1679, which, though it failed, was an early effort to establish an executive along the lines of what later came to be understood as Cabinet government. Charles II disapproved of the scheme, which in his view took away too much of the Royal Prerogative, although in the exceptional circumstances of the Exclusion Crisis he was willing to give it a brief trial.

Temple later left Sheen and purchased Compton Hall, Farnham around 1686. He renamed the house More Park after Moor Park, Hertfordshire, a house he much admired and which influenced the formal gardens he built at Farnham. Here the later-famous Jonathan Swift was his secretary for most of the period from 1689 onward. It was here that Swift met Esther Johnson, who became his lifelong companion and whom he immortalised as Stella. Despite rumours that she was Temple's own daughter, the evidence suggests that her widowed mother lived in the house as companion to Temple's sister Martha. Temple installed his family motto "God has given us these opportunities for tranquility" above the door and took great pleasure from this house in his retirement from public life.

He took no part in the Glorious Revolution, but acquiesced to the new regime, and was offered, but refused, a role as Secretary of State.

Temple died in More Park, Surrey, England in 1699. His memorial in Westminster Abbey names also his wife Dorothy, and their daughter Diana; in 1722 his sister Martha was also buried in the abbey and her name was added as she had left money for a monument. He was much loved by his friends; Swift wrote that all that was good and amiable in mankind departed with him. The normally cynical Robert Spencer, 2nd Earl of Sunderland, was deeply grieved by his death, writing to Temple's sister Martha that "the chief pleasure I proposed to myself was to see him sometimes".

== Marriage and children ==
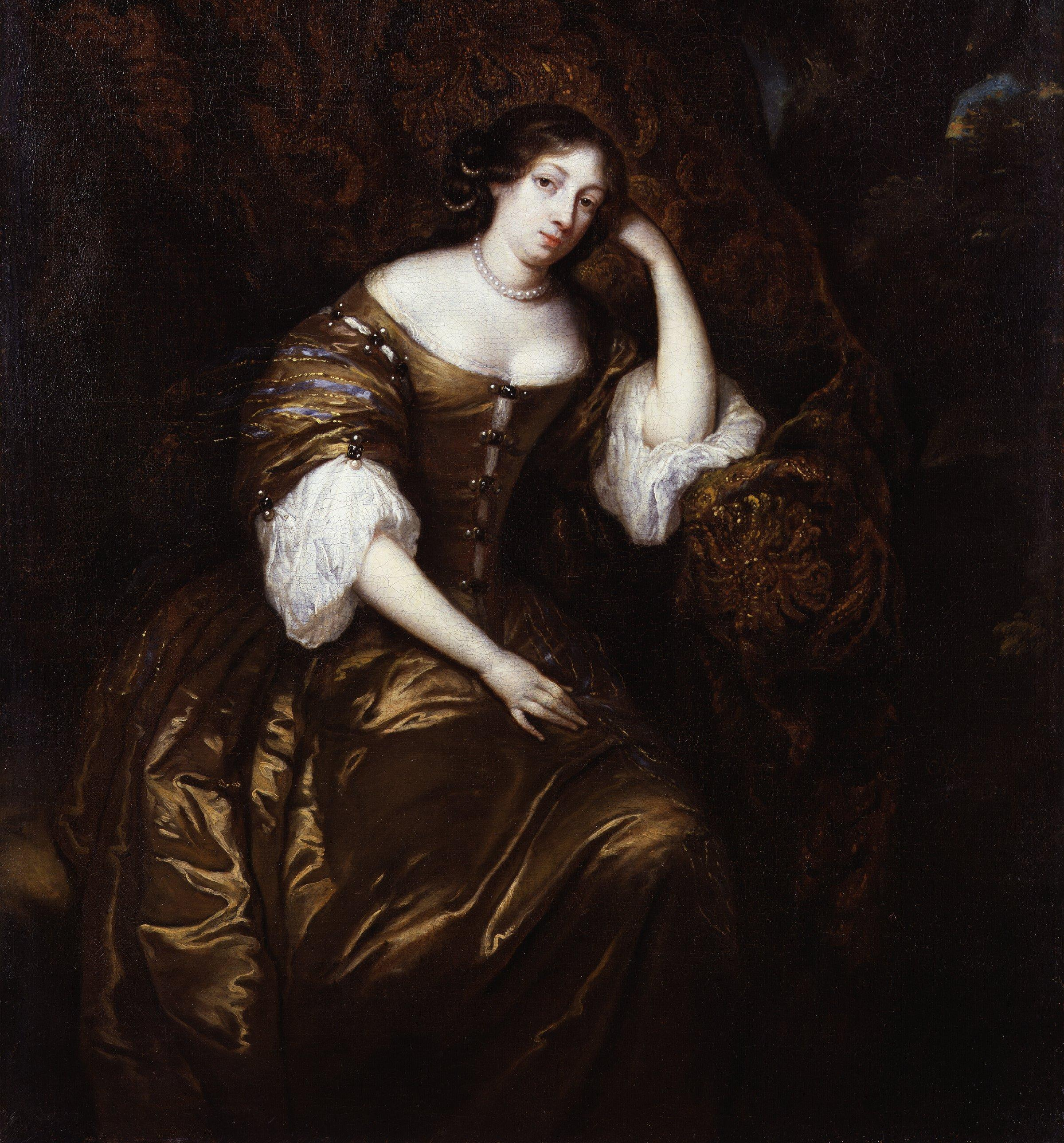
"Dorothy, Lady Temple" by Gaspar Netscher 1671

Temple married Dorothy Osborne (d. 1695), a daughter of Sir Peter Osborne and Dorothy Danvers, in 1654. It was a love marriage and the couple were noted for constancy during their long engagement: Dorothy resisted pressure from her family to accept any of several other more eligible suitors, including Henry Cromwell and her cousin Thomas Osborne, 1st Duke of Leeds. She and William outlived all of their nine children, most of whom died in infancy; the suicide of their adult son John in 1689 was the greatest tragedy of their lives. Dorothy died in 1695 and after her death William's strong-minded sister Martha, Lady Giffard kept house for him. She had married Sir Thomas Giffard in 1662 and been widowed young; she spent many years with William and Dorothy, for both of whom she had a deep affection. In her last years she wrote a short Life of her brother which was published in 1728 after her death in 1722. Martha believed that Jonathan Swift had lifted parts of her biography to include in his Memoirs of Sir William Temple, Part 3, although Swift denied her accusation.

Sir William and Dorothy Osborne's children included:

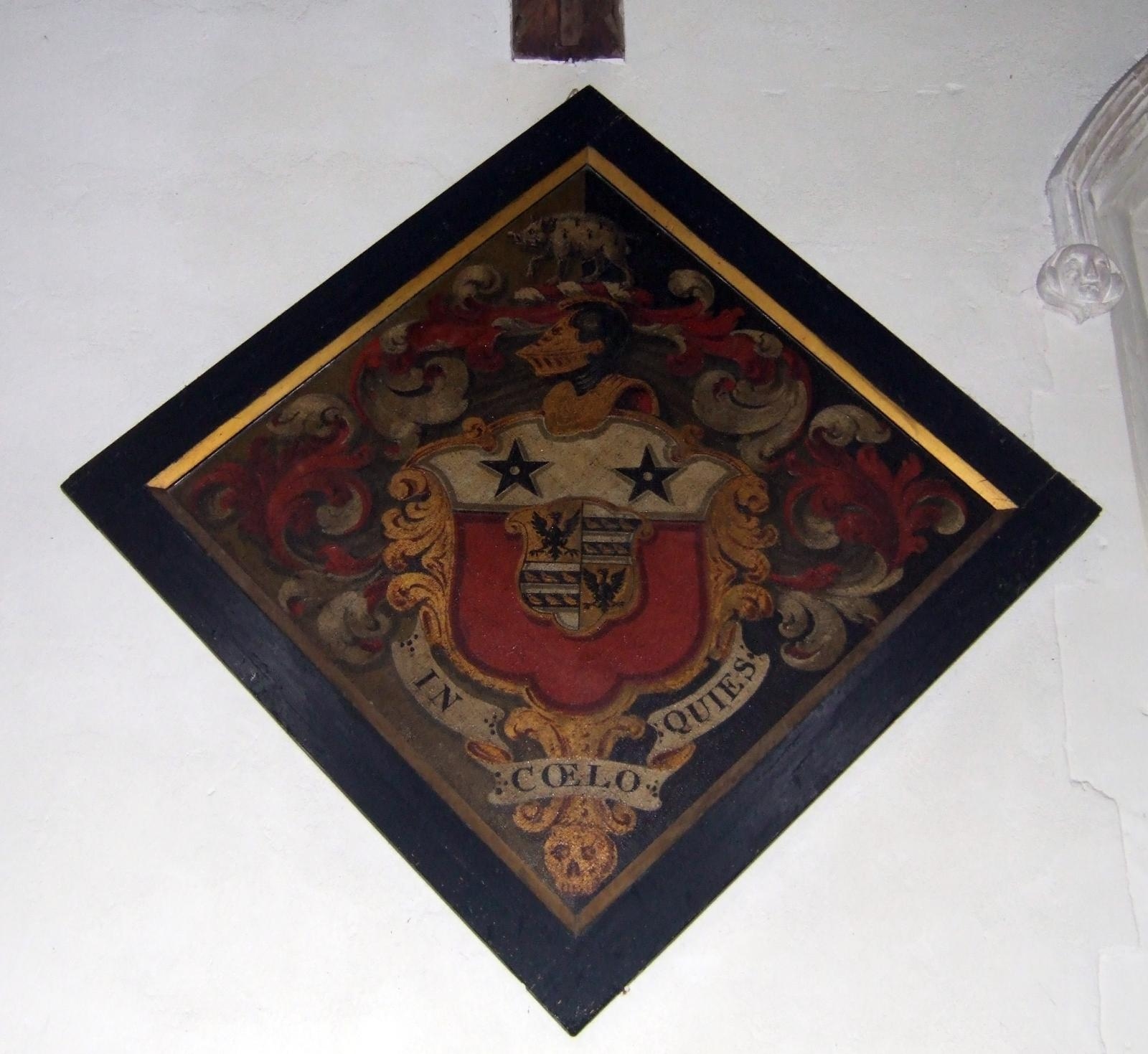
Funeral hatchment of Nicholas Bacon (1686–1767) of Shrubland Hall, Coddenham, Suffolk, husband of Dorothy Temple, grand-daughter of Sir William Temple. The arms of Temple are shown as an inescutcheon, as appropriate for an heiress

- John Temple (d. 1689), who "as a compliment to his father" was made Paymaster General and, on 12 April 1689, Secretary at War in succession to William Blathwayt. A few days later, having filled his pockets with stones, he threw himself from a boat into the strong current beneath London Bridge, and was drowned. The suicide, which created the greatest sensation at the time, was probably due to official anxiety, aggravated by the treachery of a confidential agent whom he had recommended to the king. He married Marie du Plessis-Rambouillet, daughter of Paul du Plessis-Rambouillet of France, of a Huguenot family, by whom he left two daughters:
  - Elizabeth Temple of Moor Park, who married her cousin, John Temple (d. 1753), second son of Sir John Temple, Speaker of the Irish House of Commons, but left no issue;
  - Dorothy Temple, who married Nicholas Bacon (1686–1767) of Shrubland Hall, Coddenham, Suffolk, and left issue. His funeral hatchment showing the arms of Temple survives in Coddenham Church.

Letters written by Dorothy to Temple before their marriage have been published in a number of editions.

== Retirement and gardening ==
Temple saw his retirement from political life to his country estate at Moor Park as following the example of the Greek philosopher Epicurus. In his essay of 1685 (first published in 1690), "Upon the Gardens of Epicurus" Temple wrote of "the sweetness and satisfaction of this retreat, where since my resolution taken of never entering again into any public employments, I have passed five years without once going to town". As a result of his introducing the term sharawadgi in this essay, Temple has been sometimes considered the originator of the English landscape garden style.

As a garden writer, Temple was rather typical of his period in England, but perhaps to an extreme degree, in being highly interested in growing fruit trees of all sorts and very little interested in flowers:

I will not enter upon any Account of Flowers, having only pleased my self with seeing and smelling them, and not troubled my self with the Care, which is more the Ladies Part than the Mens; but the Success is wholly in the Gardener.

The passage in which Temple outlines the concept of sharawadgi is the following:

Amongst us, the Beauty of Building and Planting is placed chiefly in some Proportions, Symmetries and Uniformities; our Walks and our Trees ranged so, as to answer one another, and at exact Distances. The Chineses scorn this way of Planting, and say a Boy that can tell an Hundred, may plant Walks of Trees in strait Lines, and over-against one another, and to what Length and Extent he pleases. But their greatest reach of Imagination, is employed in contriving Figures, where the Beauty shall be great, and strike the Eye, but without any Order or Disposition of Parts, that shall be commonly or easily observ'd. And though we have hardly any Notion of this sort of Beauty, yet they have a particular word to express it; and where they find it hit their Eye at first Sight, they say the Sharawadgi is fine or is admirable, or any such Expression of Esteem. And whoever observes the Work upon the best Indian gowns, or the Painting on their best Skreens and Purcellans, will find their Beauty is all of this Kind, (that is) without Order. But I should hardly advise any of these Attempts in the Figure of Gardens among us; they are Adventures of too hard Atchievement for any common hands; and tho' there may be more Honour if they succeed well, yet there is more Dishonour if they fail, and 'tis Twenty to One they will; whereas in regular Figures, 'tis hard to make any great and remarkable Faults.

In 1690, Temple intervened in the debate about the difference between the ancients and the moderns with his essay On Ancient and Modern Learning, and his prose style was praised by later critics. Hume called it negligent and infected by foreign idioms, but agreeable and interesting; not like the perusal of a book, but conversation with a companion. Samuel Johnson called him "the first writer who gave cadence to English prose. Before his time they were careless of arrangement, and did not mind whether a sentence ended with an important word or an insignificant word, or with what part of speech it was concluded". His style was also highly praised by Swift. Macaulay called his prose singularly lucid and melodious.

== Death ==
Temple died on 27 January 1699. He was buried in Westminster Abbey, but his heart, by his special wish, was placed in a silver casket under the sun-dial at Moor Park, near his favourite window seat. Swift recorded, "He died at one o clock in the morning and with him all that was great and good among men".

== Bibliography ==
His literary works consist for the most part of essays, which were published as Miscellanea in volumes in the 1690s, then collected by Swift and given a collected volume in 1720. However, he did write some longer pieces such as Observations upon the United Provinces and Essay on the Original and Nature of Government.

- Observations upon the United Provinces of the Netherlands. London: Printed by A[nne] Maxwell for Sa[muel] Gellibrand at the Golden Ball in St. Paul’s Church-yard. 1673. OCLC 8702219. Republished by Cambridge University Press, with an introduction by G. N. Clark, Cambridge, 2011.
- Miscellanea: The First Part (4th ed.). London: Printed For Jacob Tonson. 1705.
- The Works of Sir William Temple, London, 1720; new. ed. 1757

== See also ==
- General opinion, a concept introduced by Temple in his Essay on the Original and Nature of Government
- Archive.org: "Temple, William, Sir, 1628-1699"

== Notes ==
Baronetage of England
New creation	Baronet (of Sheen); 1666–1699	Extinct
