= Vanessa (Millais) =

Painting by John Everett Millais

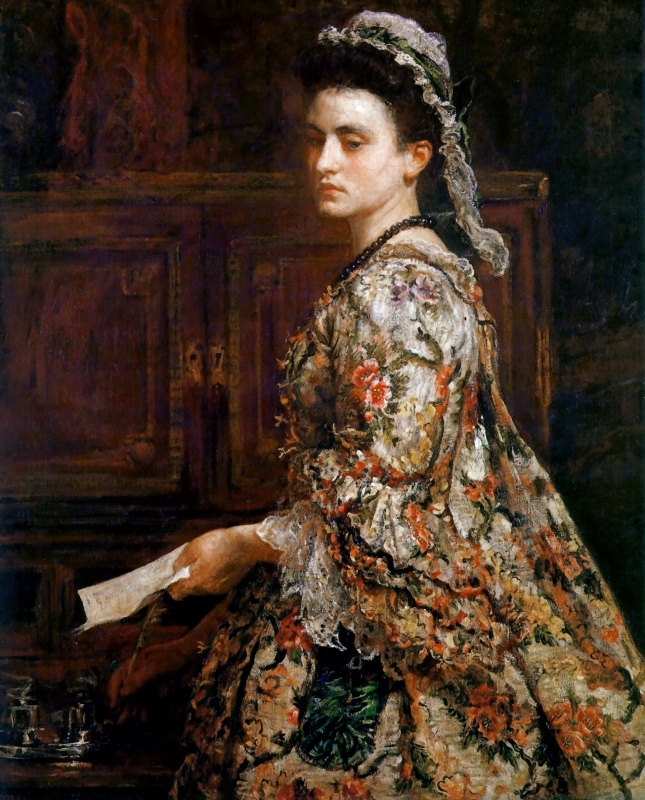
- Artist: John Everett Millais
- Year: 1868
- Medium: Oil on canvas
- Dimensions: 112.7 cm × 91.5 cm (44.4 in × 36.0 in)
- Location: Sudley House, Liverpool

Vanessa (1868) is a painting by John Everett Millais in Sudley House, Liverpool. It is a fancy portrait depicting Esther Vanhomrigh, known by the nickname "Vanessa", invented for her by Jonathan Swift, her close friend and correspondent (1688–1723).

== History and description ==
Vanessa represents a major departure in Millais's art because he abandons fully for the first time the detailed finish that was still to be seen in Waking and Sleeping, exhibited in the previous year. Influenced by the work of Diego Velázquez and Joshua Reynolds, Millais paints with dramatic, visible brush strokes in vivid colours, creating what has been described as an "almost violently modern" handling of paint.

Esther Vanhomrigh is known as "Swift's Vanessa" because of the fictional name he gave her when he published their correspondence. The portrait is wholly imaginary. No image of Esther Vanhomrigh survives and we know very little about her actual appearance, although she was said "not to be a beauty". She is holding a letter, presumably written to or by Swift. Her sad expression is related to the fraught nature of the relationship, which was ended by Swift's relationship with another woman, Esther Johnson, whom he called "Stella", and whom he may have married secretly. Vanessa died soon afterwards from tuberculosis. Millais also painted a companion piece depicting Stella.

The painting is part of the 18th century revival in British art at this time, when a renewed interest in the brushwork of Reynolds and Gainsborough was emerging. It was displayed at the Royal Academy Exhibition of 1869 at Burlington House in London.

== See also ==
- List of paintings by John Everett Millais
