= List of knights bachelor appointed in 1916 =

Knight Bachelor is the oldest and lowest-ranking form of knighthood in the British honours system; it is the rank granted to a man who has been knighted by the monarch but not inducted as a member of one of the organised orders of chivalry. Women are not knighted; in practice, the equivalent award for a woman is appointment as Dame Commander of the Order of the British Empire (founded in 1917).

== Knights bachelor appointed in 1916 ==
Date	Name	Notes	Ref
1 January 1916	Milsom Rees, CVO, FRCS	Laryngologist to the King's Household and to Queen Alexandra	
1 January 1916	Frederick Samuel Augustus Bourne, CMG	Assistant Judge of His Majesty's Supreme Court for China and Korea at Shanghai and Judge of His Majesty's High Court at Wei-hai-Wei	
1 January 1916	Marshall Reid, CIE	Managing Director of the Bombay Company, Limited	
1 January 1916	Henry James Wakely Fry, CIE	lately Director-General of Stores, India Office	
1 January 1916	Frederic Gorell Barnes		
1 January 1916	Maj. George Andreas Berry, MB, LLD	Honorary Surgeon-Oculist to His Majesty in Scotland; Major, RAMC(T)	
1 January 1916	Arthur William Black, MP		
1 January 1916	John Boraston		
1 January 1916	William Henry Bowater	ex-Lord Mayor of Birmingham	
1 January 1916	James Bruton	Mayor of Gloucester	
1 January 1916	Harcourt Everard Clare	Clerk of the Lancaster County Council	
1 January 1916	Francis Henry Dent	General Manager of the South-Eastern and Chatham Railway	
1 January 1916	Owen Morgan Edwards	Chief Inspector of Education for Wales	
1 January 1916	Lazarus Fletcher, LLD, FRS	Director of the Natural History Department of the British Museum	
1 January 1916	George Franklin	Pro-Chancellor of Sheffield University	
1 January 1916	John Howard		
1 January 1916	Thomas John Hughes	Chairman of the National Health Insurance Commission for Wales	
1 January 1916	Robert Keith Inches	Lord Provost of Edinburgh	
1 January 1916	Francis Edgar Kearney		
1 January 1916	Horace Woodburn Kirby	President of the Society of Chartered Accountants	
1 January 1916	Hedley Francis Le Bas		
1 January 1916	Daniel McCabe	ex-Lord Mayor of Manchester	
1 January 1916	William Middlebrook, MP		
1 January 1916	Henry O'Shea	Lord Mayor of Cork	
1 January 1916	Thomas Wright Parkinson, MD		
1 January 1916	Richard Atkinson Robinson		
1 January 1916	Patrick Shortall	High Sheriff of Dublin	
1 January 1916	The Very Rev. George Adam Smith, DD, LLD, LittD	Principal and Vice-Chancellor of Aberdeen University	
1 January 1916	Robert Wallace, KC	Chairman of Quarter Sessions for the County of London	
1 January 1916	Thomas Beecham		
1 January 1916	Rai Kailash Chandra Basu Bahadur, CIE	Member of the Municipal Corporation of Calcutta	
1 January 1916	Baba Gurbakhsh Singh Bedi, CIE	Honorary Extra Assistant Commissioner in the Punjab	
1 January 1916	William Bernard Hunter	Secretary and Treasurer of the Bank of Madras	
1 January 1916	Edward Maynard Des Champs Chamier	a Puisne Judge of the High Court of Judicature for the North-Western Provinces, designated Chief Justice of the High Court of Judicature for Bihar and Orissa	
1 January 1916	Brig. Alexander Bertram	Canadian Militia; Deputy Chairman of the Imperial Munitions Board, Canada	
1 January 1916	Anton Bertram, KC	Attorney-General of the Island of Ceylon	
1 January 1916	The Hon. Henry Briggs	President of the Legislative Council of the State of Western Australia	
1 January 1916	John Alexander Strachey Bucknill	Chief Justice of the Straits Settlements	
1 January 1916	The Hon. Frederick William Gordon Haultaiu	Chief Justice of Saskatchewan	
1 January 1916	William Wilson Hoy	General Manager of Railways and Harbours, Union of South Africa	
1 January 1916	John Kennedy	Consulting Engineer to the Montreal Harbour Commission	
1 January 1916	Lachlan Charles Mackinnon		
1 January 1916	William Duff Reid		
1 January 1916	Frank Umhlali Reynolds	Member of the House of Assembly of the Union of South Africa	
1 January 1916	The Hon. Louis Olivier Taillon, KC	Member of the King's Privy Council for Canada	
1 January 1916	Herbert Holmwood		
8 April 1916	Edmund Charles Wyldbore Smith	Officer in Charge of Commercial Inquiries, Exhibitions Branch, Board of Trade	
2 May 1916	Francis Robert Benson	"After the Shakespeare Tercentenary commemoration performance at the Theatre Royal, Drury Lane"	
3 June 1916	James Tynte Agg-Gardner, MP		
3 June 1916	John Anthony		
3 June 1916	George Thomas Beilby, FRS		
3 June 1916	Arthur William Binning		
3 June 1916	Thomas Collins	Chief Inspector, Board of Inland Revenue	
3 June 1916	Theodore Andrea Cook	Editor of The Field	
3 June 1916	John Henry Cork	Mayor of Portsmouth	
3 June 1916	George Philip Doolette	President of the Australian Voluntary Hospital at Wimereux	
3 June 1916	Arthur Isaac Durrant, MVO	Comptroller of the Supplies Division, Office of Works	
3 June 1916	Francis Mark Farmer		
3 June 1916	William Gallagher, ISO	Chief Inspector, Board of Customs	
3 June 1916	Eric Campbell Geddes	Deputy Director-General of Munitions Supply	
3 June 1916	William Benjamin Gentle	Chief Constable of Brighton	
3 June 1916	George Greenwood, MP		
3 June 1916	William Peter Griggs		
3 June 1916	Maurice Hill, KC		
3 June 1916	Robert Morris Liddell, JP	High Sheriff of County Down	
3 June 1916	Alfred Henry Herbert Matthews	Secretary of the Central Chamber of Agriculture	
3 June 1916	Cdr Edward Nicholl, RNR		
3 June 1916	John James Oddy		
3 June 1916	Robert Pearce, MP		
3 June 1916	Alexander William Prince		
3 June 1916	George Radford, MP		
3 June 1916	Archibald Tutton Salvidge		
3 June 1916	Clement Bell Simpson		
3 June 1916	Henry Smith	Deputy Lieutenant for the City of London	
3 June 1916	Jethro Justinian Harris Teall, FRS, DSc		
3 June 1916	Prof. Nestor Tirard, MD, FRCP		
3 June 1916	Glynn Hamilton West	Deputy Director-General of Munitions Supply	
3 June 1916	Frederick Whitley Whitley-Thomson		
3 June 1916	Armand Marc Ruffer, CMG, MD	President of the International Quarantine Board in Egypt. He could attend the investiture in July; if his dubbing ever took place, it does not appear to have been gazetted.	
3 June 1916	Alexander Forbes Proctor Roger	Director-General of Trench Warfare Supplies	
3 June 1916	David Hope Kyd, LLD		
3 June 1916	The Hon. Marshall Campbell	Senator of the Union of South Africa	
3 June 1916	The Hon. Wallace Graham	Chief Justice of the Supreme Court of Nova Scotia	
3 June 1916	The Hon. Pierre Armand Landry	Chief Justice of the King's Bench Division of the Supreme Court of New Brunswick	
3 June 1916	The Hon. Frederic William Lang	Speaker of the House of Representatives of the Dominion of New Zealand	
3 June 1916	The Hon. Robert Furse McMillan	Chief Justice of Western Australia	
3 June 1916	The Hon. Herbert Nicholls	Chief Justice of the Supreme Court of Tasmania	
3 June 1916	Gilbert Kenelm Treffry Purcell	Chief Justice of the Colony of Sierra Leone	
3 June 1916	Robert Frederic Stupart	Director of the Meteorological Service of Canada	
3 June 1916	The Hon. Antonie Gysbert Viljoen	Senator of tihe Union of South Africa	
3 June 1916	Stanley Reed, LLD		
3 June 1916	Ratanji Jamshedji Tata, JP		
3 June 1916	Francis Hugh Stewart, CIE		
3 June 1916	Charles William Chitty	a Puisne Judge of the High Court of Judicature at Fort William in Bengal a Puisne Judge of the High Court of Judicature at Fort William in Bengal	
3 June 1916	Robert Swan Highet		
23 October 1916	Henry Alfred McCardie	Justice of the High Court of Justice	
29 December 1916	Gordon Hewart, KC	Solicitor-General	
