= Fraser baronets of Tain (1943) =

The Fraser Baronetcy, of Tain in the County of Ross, was created in the Baronetage of the United Kingdom on 12 July 1943 for John Fraser. He was Regius Professor of Clinical Surgery at the University of Edinburgh and Honorary Surgeon to His Majesty the King in Scotland. As of 2026, the title is held by his great-grandson, the fourth Baronet, who succeeded his father in 2019.

== Fraser baronets, of Tain (1943) ==
- Sir John Fraser, 1st Baronet (1885–1947)
- Sir James David Fraser, 2nd Baronet (1924–1997)
- Sir Iain Michael Duncan Fraser, 3rd Baronet (1951–2019)
- Sir Benjamin James Fraser, 4th Baronet (born 1986)

The heir apparent is the present holder's son Duncan James Fraser (born 2016).

Coat of arms of the Fraser baronets of Tain
Crest A buck's head erased Proper. Escutcheon Azure three cinquefoils argent on a chief of the last three bears' heads couped of the field muzzled of the second. Motto Furtachd is foir, Help and comfort
