= Sir Malcolm Fraser, 1st Baronet =

British journalist, writer and political agent (1878–1949)

Captain Sir Malcolm Fraser Bt GBE KStJ DL
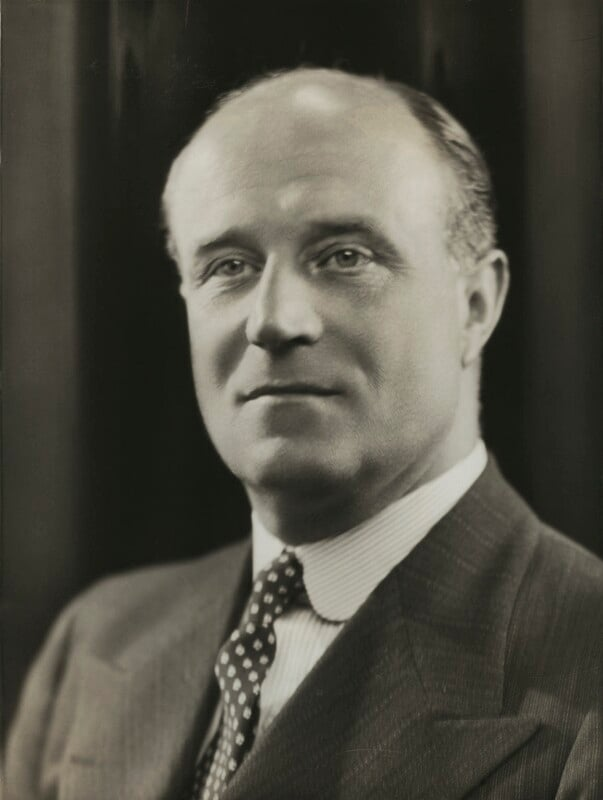
- Fraser in 1934
- Born: John Malcolm Fraser; 24 December 1878; Hampstead, London, England
- Died: 4 May 1949 (aged 70)
- Occupations: Journalist, writer and political agent

Sir John Malcolm Fraser, 1st Baronet (24 December 1878 – 4 May 1949) was a British journalist, writer and political agent.

== Biography ==
Fraser was born in Hampstead, London. He became a journalist and rose rapidly to become assistant editor of The Standard. He was then successively editor of the Evening Standard and St James's Gazette, day editor of the Daily Express, and editor-in-chief of the Birmingham Gazette, Birmingham Dispatch, and other papers in the same group. In 1910 Arthur Balfour appointed him adviser on press matters to the Conservative Party.

Between December 1902 and August 1903, Fraser co-authored seven short stories of adventure fiction with Bertram Fletcher Robinson. In February 1904, six of these stories were published in a book titled The Trail of the Dead (Ward, Lock & Co.). During 1998, the seventh story, titled "Fog Bound", was republished as "Fogbound" in a compendium of short stories that was edited by Jack Adrian and titled Twelve Tales of Murder. In April 2009, all seven tales were republished in a book titled Aside Arthur Conan Doyle: Twenty Original Tales by Bertram Fletcher Robinson, which was compiled by Paul Spiring.

In November 1915, Fraser was commissioned Temporary Lieutenant in the Royal Naval Air Service (Royal Naval Volunteer Reserve), and specialised in airships. He was promoted Temporary Lieutenant-Commander in February 1917 and ended the First World War as Deputy Director of Aircraft Production at the Admiralty with the rank of Captain. On the formation of the Royal Air Force in 1918, he stayed in the Royal Navy instead of transferring to the RAF with most other RNAS officers.

After the war, Fraser returned to Conservative Party headquarters and was appointed Honorary Principal Agent in 1920. He headed the government's British Gazette during the 1926 General Strike.

Fraser was knighted in 1919 for his services to the Admiralty, created a baronet in the 1921 Birthday Honours, and appointed Knight Grand Cross of the Order of the British Empire (GBE) in 1922. He was appointed High Sheriff of Surrey in 1937. and Lord Lieutenant of Surrey in 1939.

In the 1930s, Fraser donated money to Dorking Urban District Council to purchase part of the Denbies estate for council housing. The resulting development, designed by the architect George Grey Wornum, was named 'Fraser Gardens' in his honour.

== Footnotes ==
Party political offices
Preceded by John Boraston and William Jenkins	Principal Agent of the Conservative Party; 1920 – 1923	Succeeded by Sir Reginald Hall
Honorary titles
Preceded by The Lord Ashcombe	Lord Lieutenant of Surrey; 1939–1949	Succeeded by Sir Robert Haining
Court offices
Preceded by Sir Park Goff	Registrar of the Imperial Society of Knights Bachelor; 1939–1941	Succeeded by Sir Edwin Lutyens
Baronetage of the United Kingdom
New creation	Baronet (of Cromarty); 1921–1949	Succeeded by Basil Fraser
