= Carey Fraser =

English courtier (d. 1709)

The Right Honourable The Countess of Peterborough and Monmouth
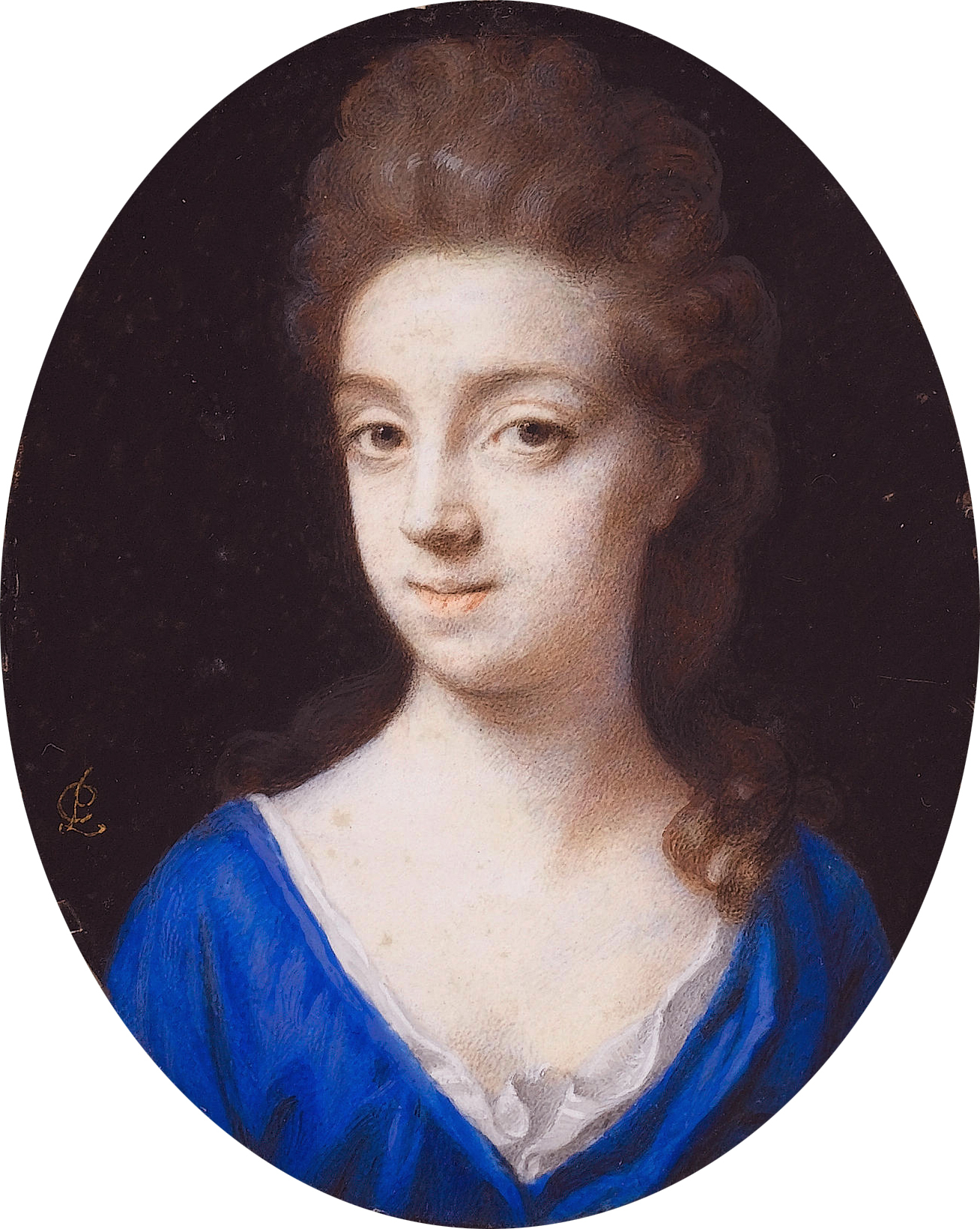
- Carey Fraser (Peter Cross)
- Born: 1658
- Died: 13 May 1709 (aged 50–51)
- Spouse: Charles Mordaunt, 3rd Earl of Peterborough
- Issue: Lady Henrietta Mordaunt; John Mordaunt, Viscount Mordaunt; Capt. Hon. Henry Mordaunt, RN
- Father: Sir Alexander Fraser
- Mother: Mary Carey

Carey Mordaunt, Countess of Peterborough and Monmouth (née Carey Fraser; c. 1658 – 13 May 1709), was an English courtier. She was a maid of honour to Charles II's queen consort, Catherine of Braganza, from 1674 to 1680, and one of the Hampton Court Beauties painted by Sir Godfrey Kneller for Queen Mary II.

== Life ==
Her father was Sir Alexander Fraser, 1st Baronet, of Durris in the County of Kincardine (1607–1681), physician to Charles II, and her mother was Mary Carey, daughter of Sir Ferdinando Carey and Philippa Throckmorton.

In 1672 she was granted an annual pension of £200 for her service as maid of honour to the queen. In 1678 she married Charles Mordaunt, 2nd Viscount Mordaunt (1658–1735), later 3rd Earl of Peterborough, and created Earl of Monmouth (in 1689). He was a distant cousin. The marriage was, however, kept secret until May 1680.

They had three children:

- Lady Henrietta Mordaunt (d. 1760), wife of Alexander Gordon, 2nd Duke of Gordon;
- John Mordaunt, Viscount Mordaunt (c.1681–1710);
- Capt. Hon. Henry Mordaunt, RN (d. 27 February 1710).

She died in May 1709 and was buried at Turvey, Bedfordshire.
