= Peter Cross (painter) =

English miniature painter (c. 1645 50–1724)

Peter Cross(e) (c. 1645/50–1724) was an English miniature painter. He imitated and perhaps trained under Samuel Cooper, and was extensively employed by royalty and the nobility as a miniaturist during the reign of Queen Anne. He is said to have created an erroneous type of the features of Mary, Queen of Scots by renovating a portrait of her to appear more beautiful.

== Identity ==
It was once supposed that there were two painters, Peter Cross and Laurence or Lawrence Cross(e). The mistake originated with Vertue, who read the entwined initials PC of the artist's signature as LC. The miniatures are now all assigned to Peter Cross. He is erroneously called Lewis by Walpole and others.

== Life ==
Peter Cross was the fourth son and youngest of seven children of Anthony Cross (c. 1585–1651/2), who was a freeman of the Drapers' Company in 1614, by his wife, Margaret, née Thrall (married in 1616), who resided on Lombard Street in the parish of St Edmund, King and Martyr. His date of birth is unknown, but documentary evidence suggests that he was born about 1645.

Cross had a high reputation as a limner in the reign of Queen Anne. He was a careful imitator, perhaps a pupil of Samuel Cooper. He signed his miniatures with his initials interlaced in gold, the monogram being very similar to that used by Sir Peter Lely, to whom some of Cross's miniatures have in consequence been attributed. Cross was extensively employed by royalty and the nobility, and his miniatures entered most of the great collections, notably the Royal Collection at Windsor and the collection of the Duke of Buccleuch; some from the latter were exhibited at the winter exhibition at Burlington House in 1879. He is stated to have been commissioned to repair a small portrait of Mary, Queen of Scots in black velvet and ermine, in the possession of the Duke of Hamilton, with instructions to make it as beautiful as possible, and to have faithfully executed his commission, thus creating an entirely erroneous type of the features of that queen.

Cross possessed a valuable collection of miniatures by the Isaac and Peter Oliver, Hoskins, Cooper, and others, which were sold at his residence, the "Blue Anchor" in Henrietta Street, Covent Garden, on 5 December 1722. He died in October 1724, being, according to Vertue, who knew him, over seventy years of age.

== Gallery ==
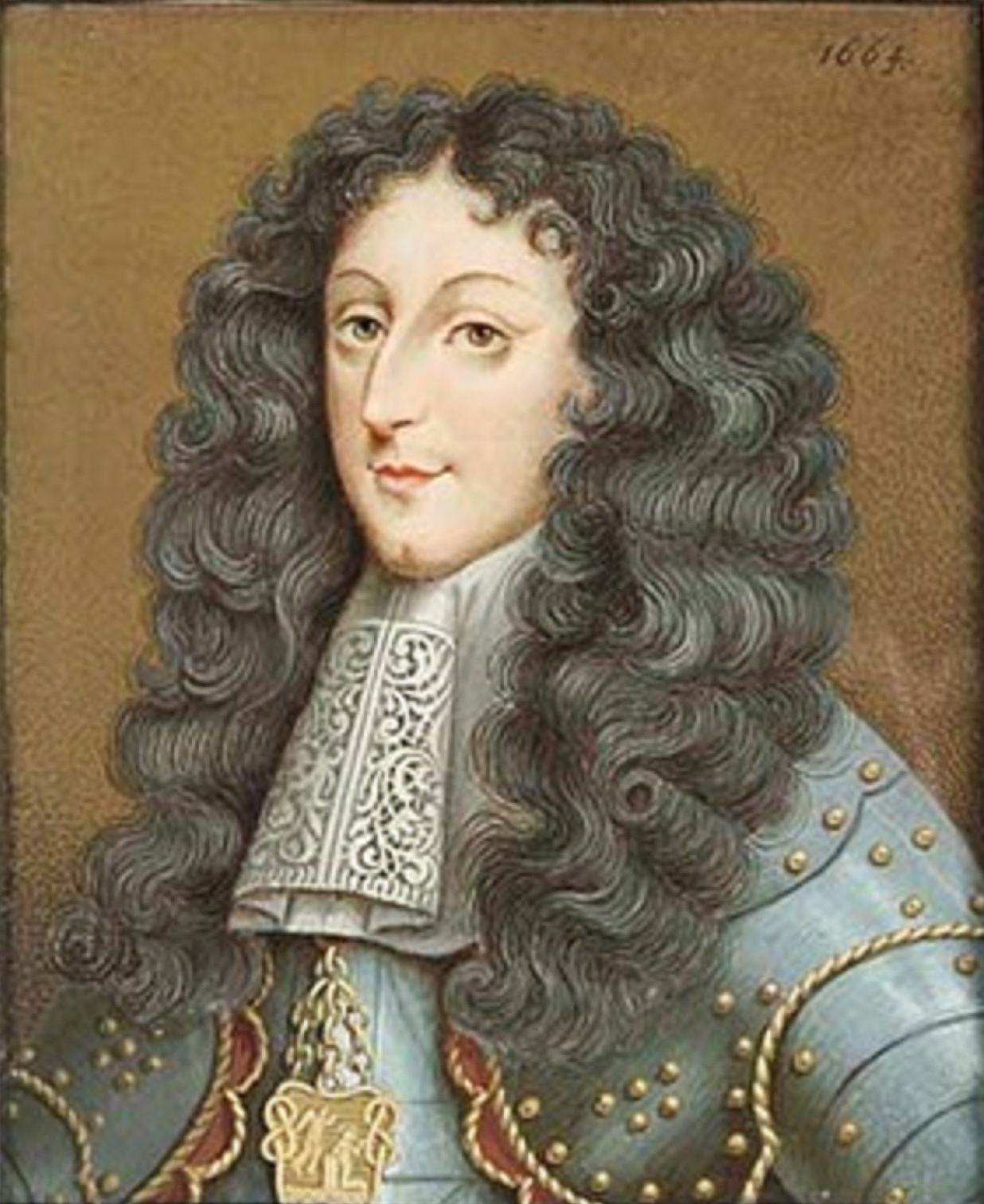
Charles Emmanuel II, Duke of Savoy (1664)

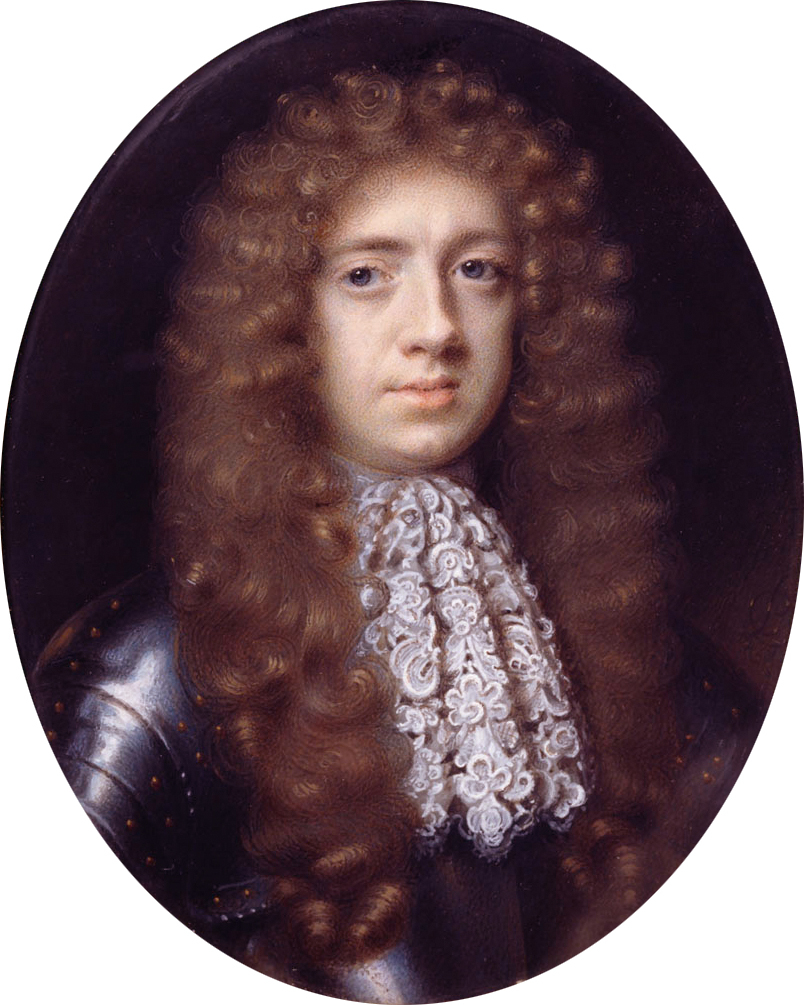
Edward Spragge, Admiral of the Blue (c. 1665)

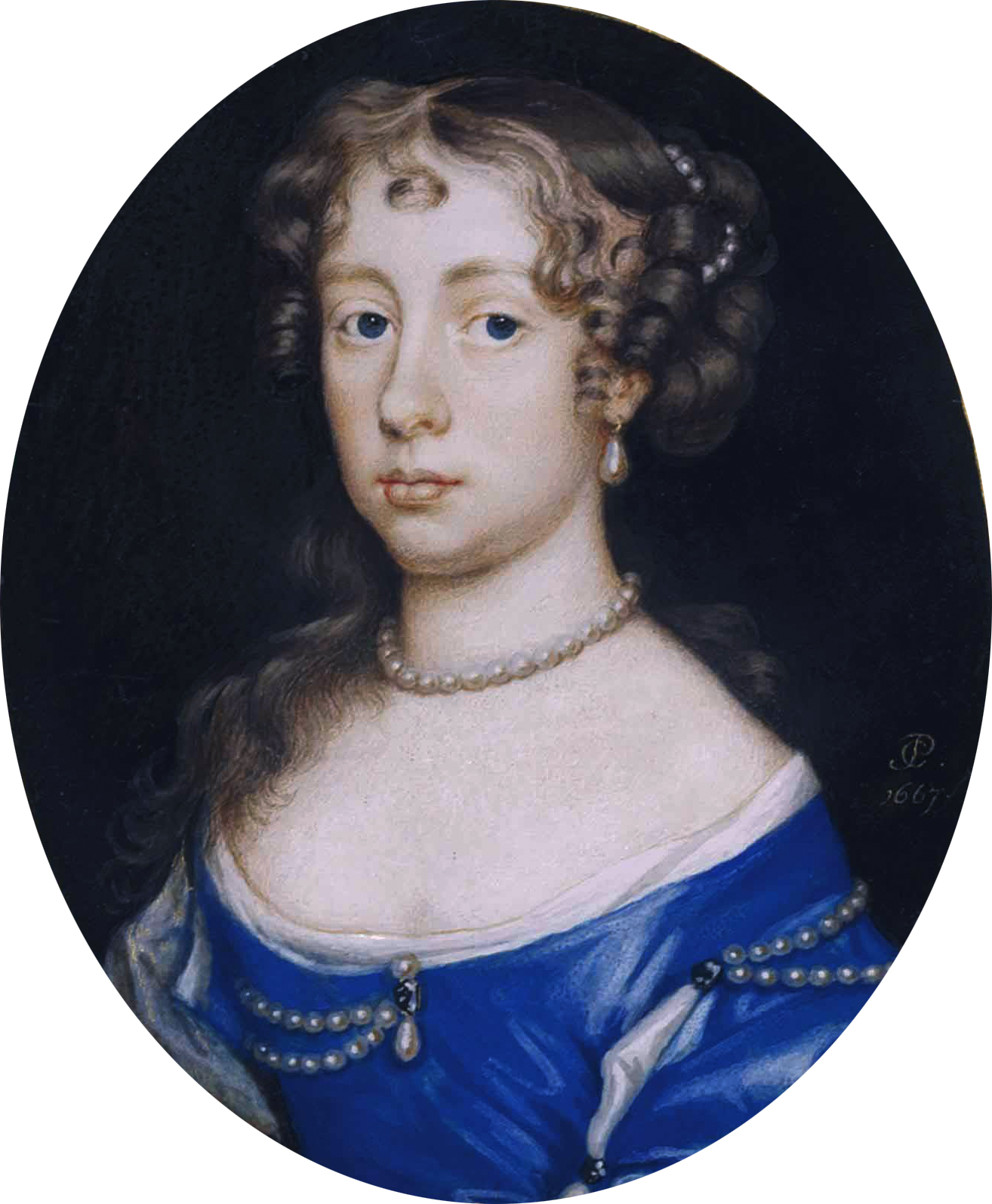
Elizabeth Stanhope, Countess of Chesterfield (1667)

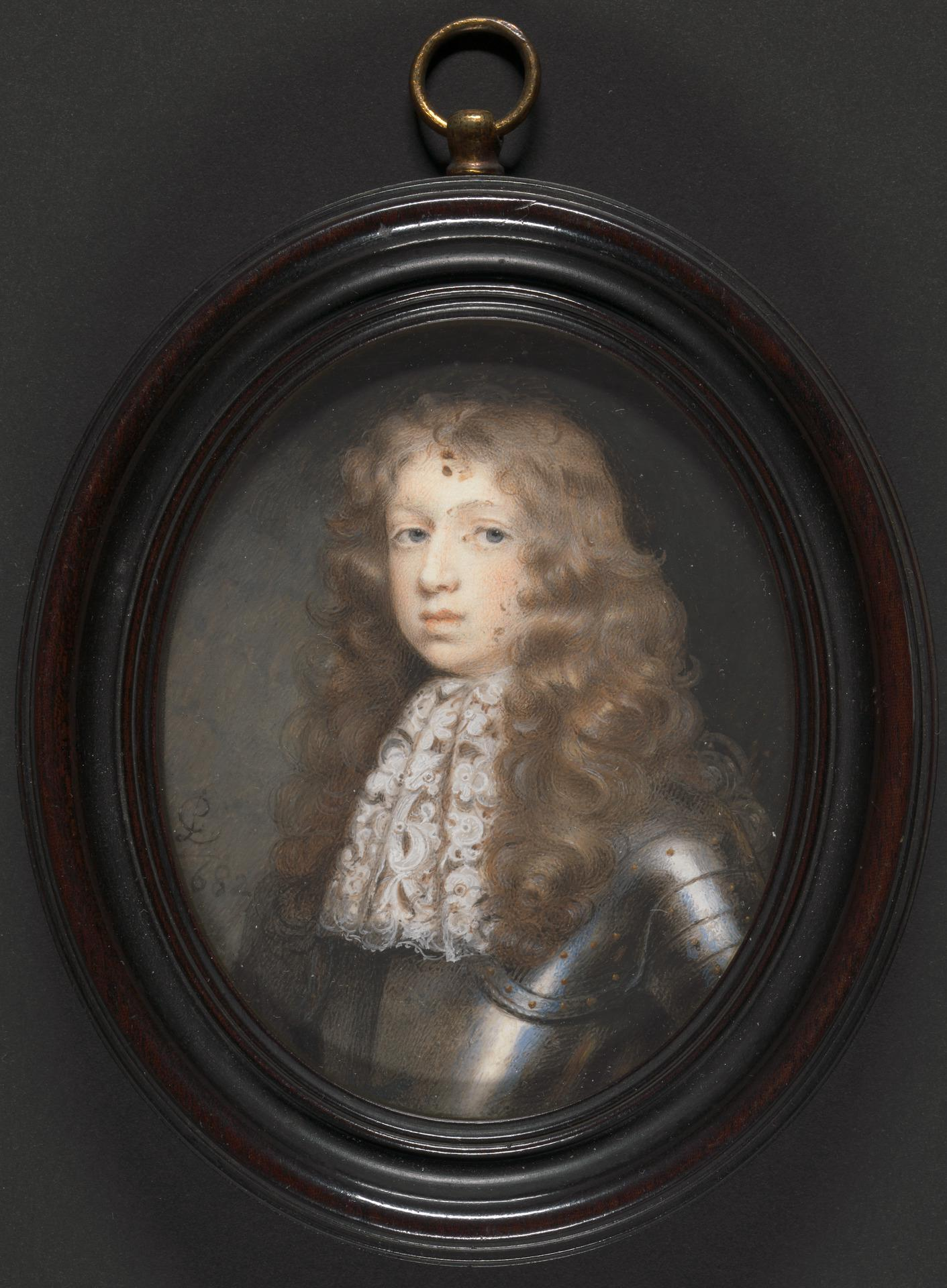
Colonel James Griffin, Aged 15 (1682)

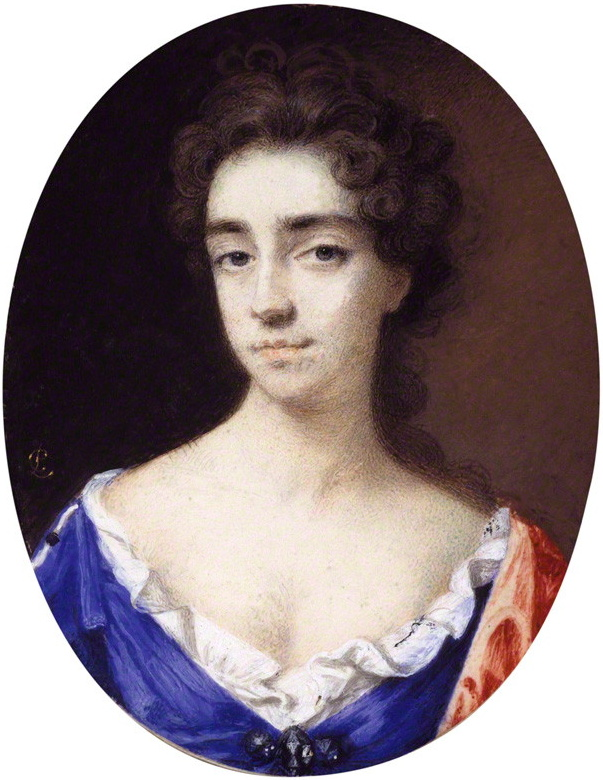
Catherine Sedley, Countess of Dorchester (c. 1685)

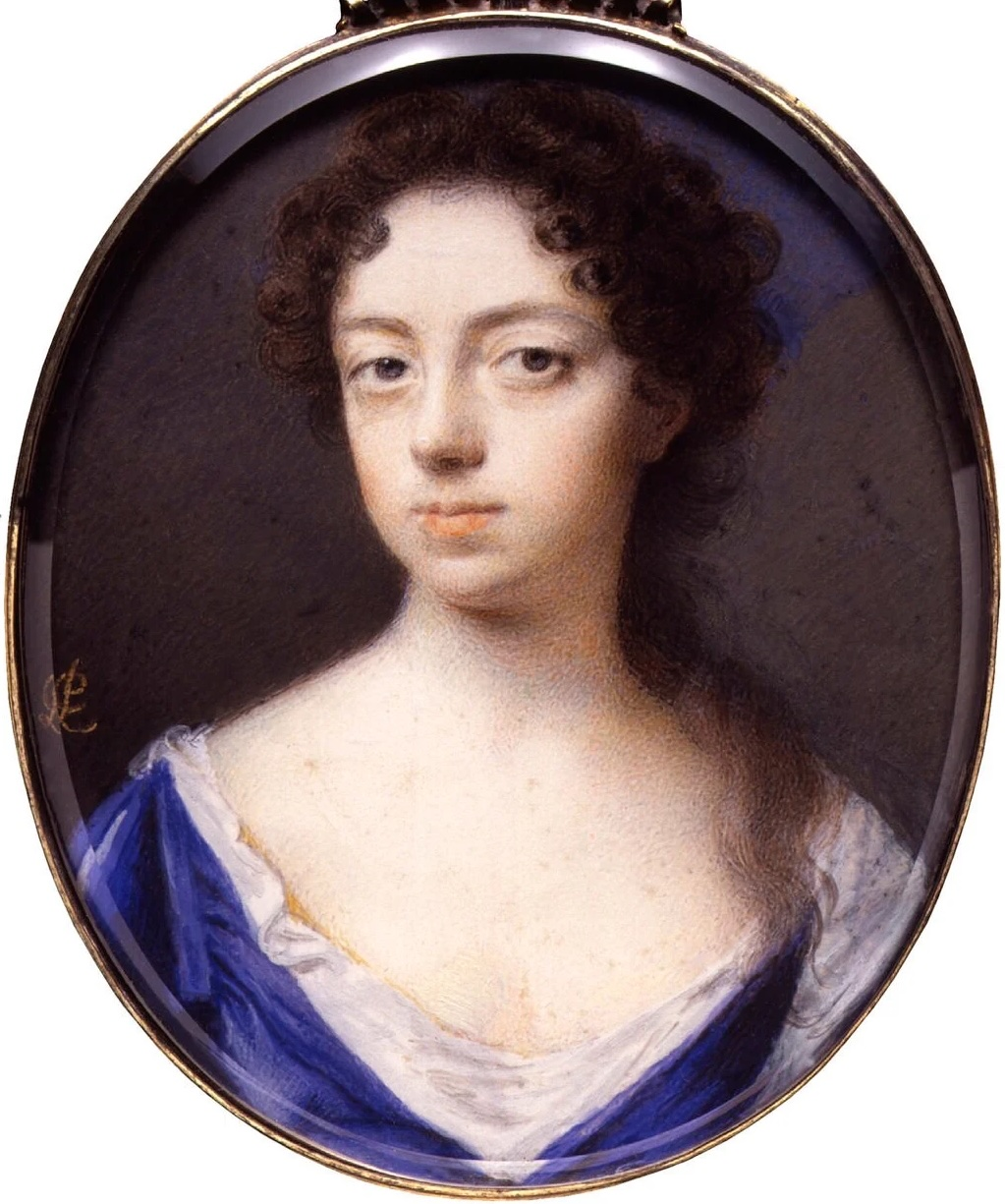
Anne Finch, Countess of Winchilsea (c. 1690–1700)

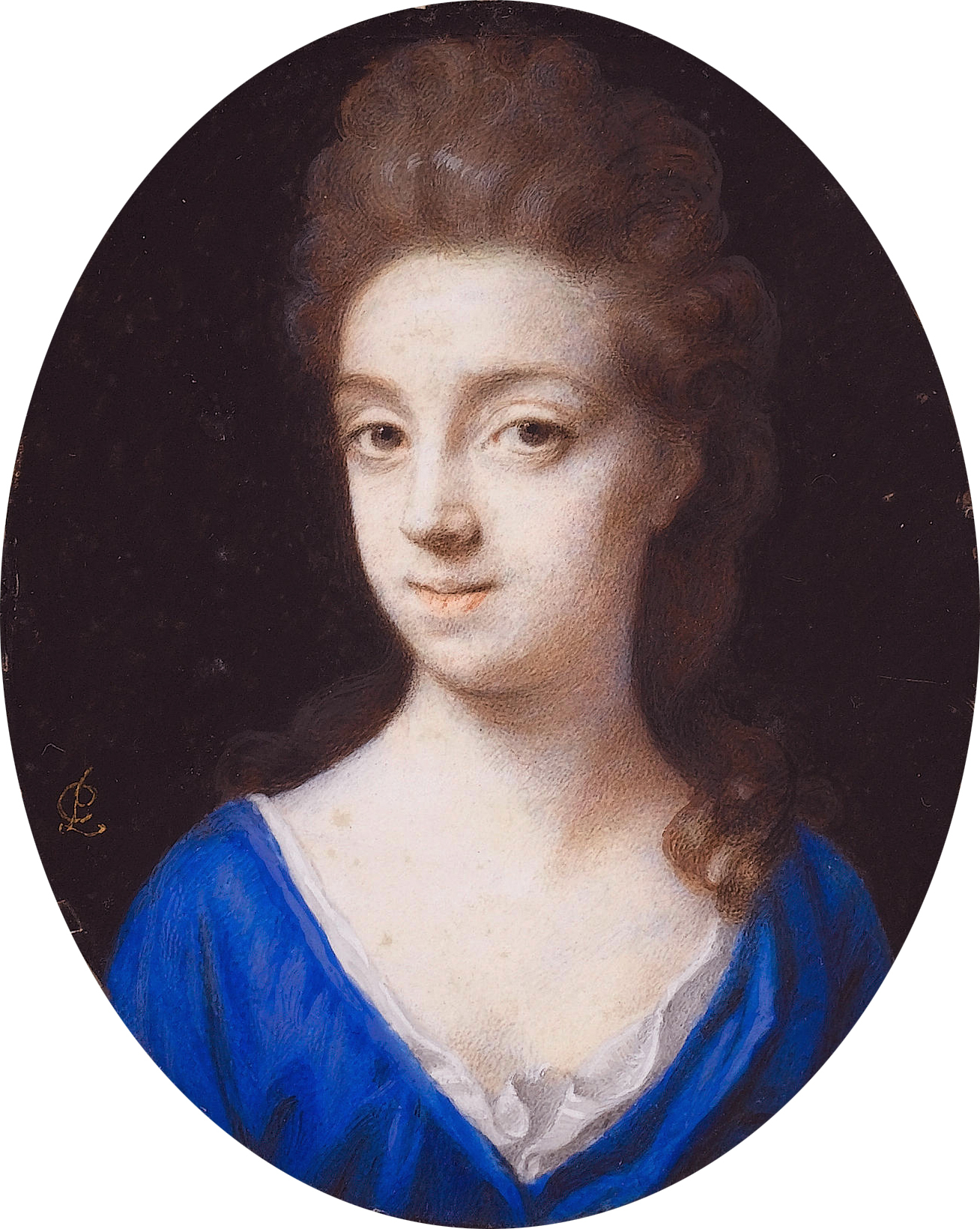
Carey Mordaunt, Countess of Peterborough (n.d.)

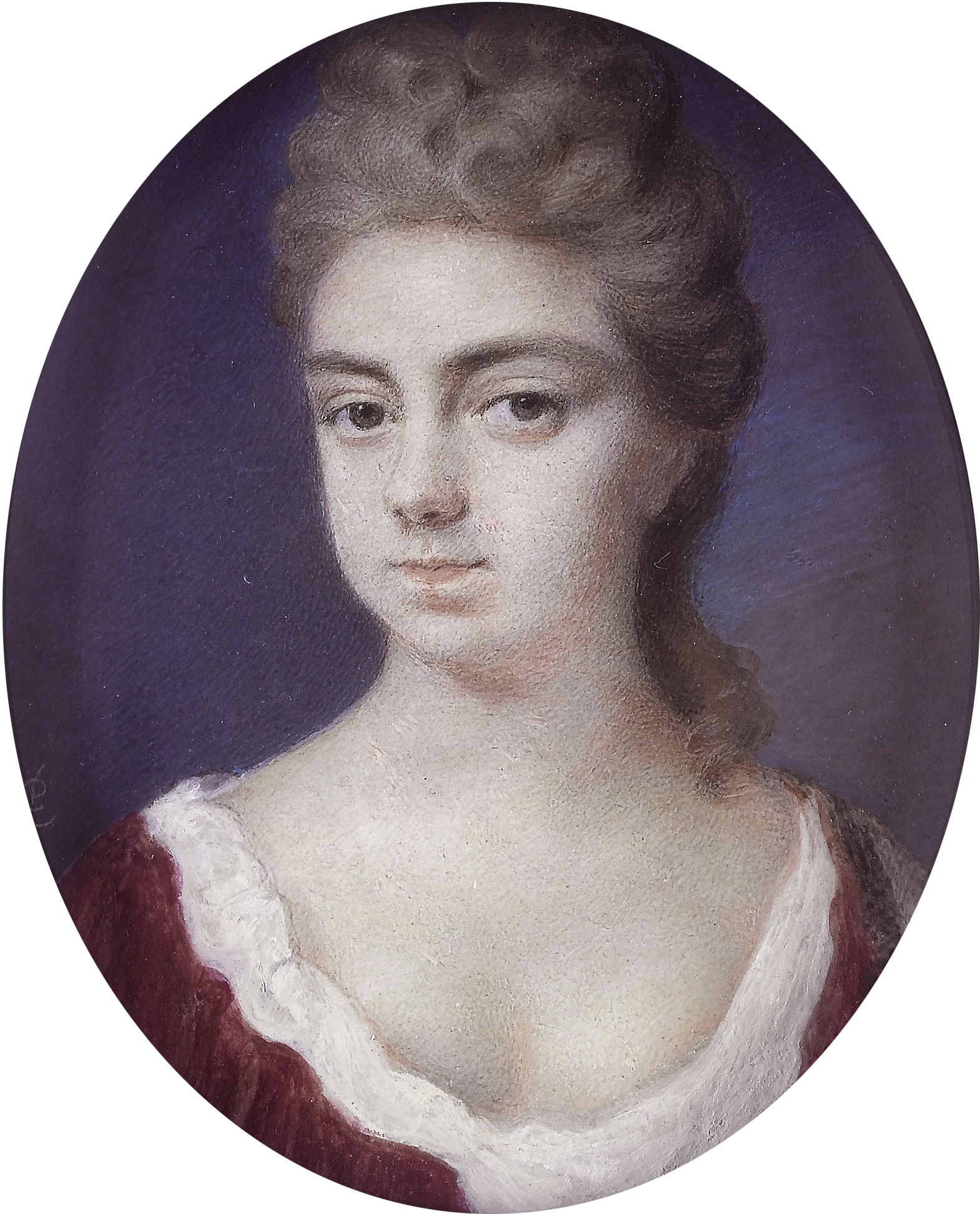
Theodosia Monckton (1698)

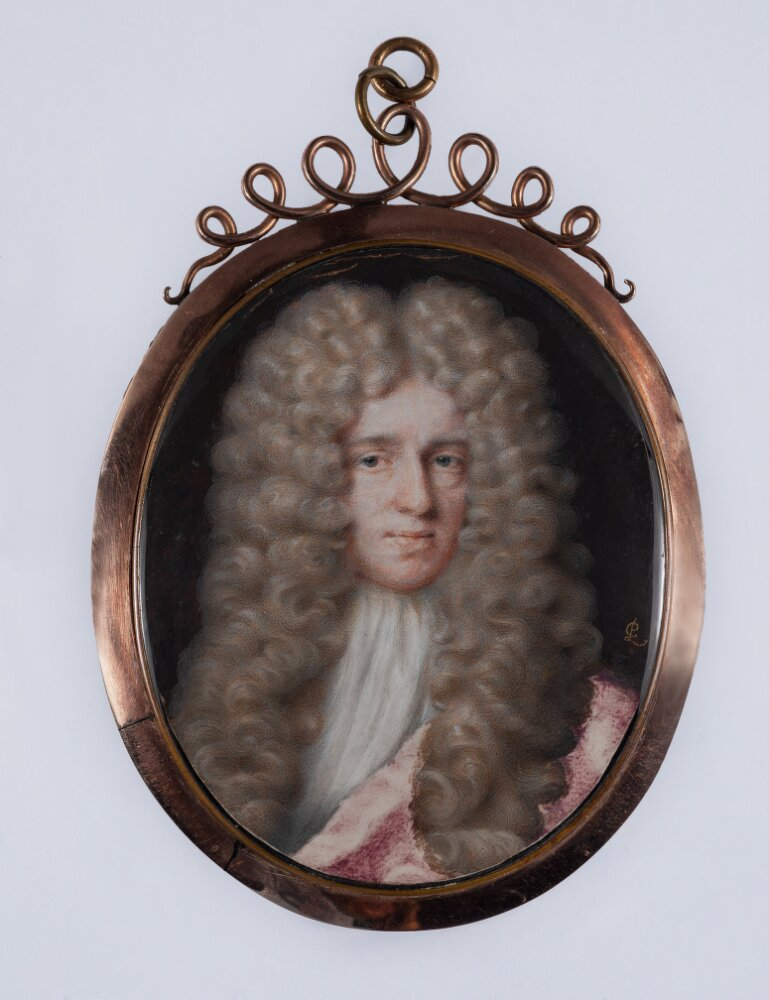
Portrait of a man (1698–1702)

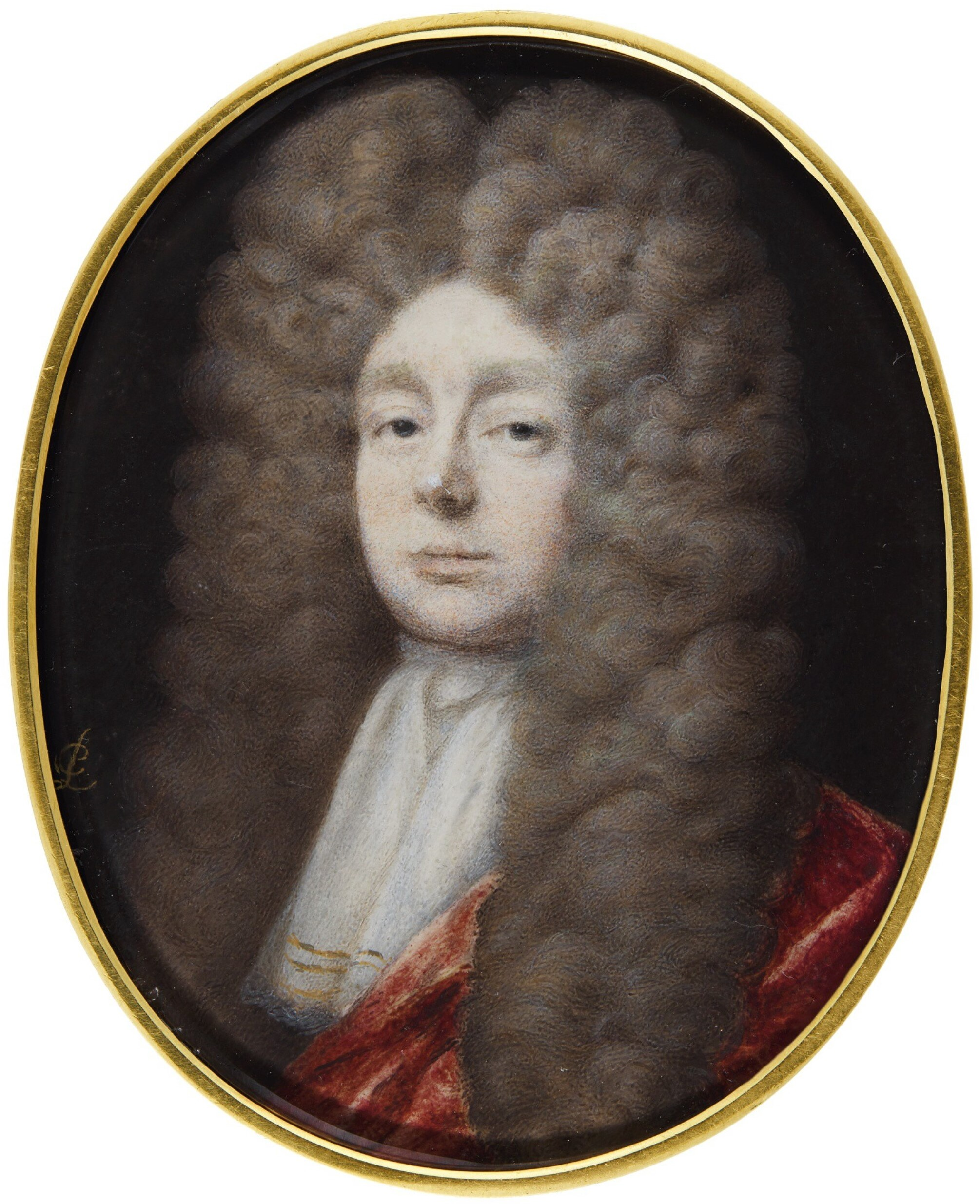
Hugh, Baron Cholmondeley (1704)

== Sources ==
- Murdoch, John (2008). "Cross, Peter [Lawrence Crosse] (c. 1645–1724), miniature painter". Oxford Dictionary of National Biography (online ed.). Oxford University Press. doi:10.1093/ref:odnb/6803. (Subscription, Wikipedia Library access or UK public library membership required.)
- Oliver, Valerie Cassel, ed. (2011). "Crosse, Lawrence". Benezit Dictionary of Artists. Oxford University Press. Retrieved 16 September 2022.
- Redgrave, Samuel (1874). "Crosse, Lewis". A Dictionary of Artists of the English School. London: Longmans, Green, and Co. p. 105.
- Reynolds, Graham (2003). "Cross(e), Peter". Grove Art Online. Oxford University Press. Oxford University Press. Retrieved 16 September 2022.
- Walpole, Horace (1849). Anecdotes of Painting in England. Dallaway, James; Wornum, Ralph N. (eds.). Vol. 2. London: Henry G. Bohn. pp. 635–636.
- "Peter Cross (circa 1645-1724), Artist". National Portrait Gallery. Retrieved 16 September 2022.

Attribution:

- This article incorporates text from a publication now in the public domain: Cust, Lionel Henry (1888). "Crosse, Lawrence". In Stephen, Leslie (ed.). Dictionary of National Biography. Vol. 13. London: Smith, Elder & Co. pp. 225–226.
