= Fraser baronets of Cromarty and Vale Avenue (1921) =

Escutcheon of the Fraser baronets of Cromarty and Vale Avenue

The Fraser baronetcy, of Cromarty, and of Vale Avenue in the Metropolitan Borough of Chelsea, was created in the Baronetage of the United Kingdom on 29 June 1921 for Malcolm Fraser. He was Editor of the Evening Standard and Day Editor of the Daily Express. The title became extinct on the death of his son, the second Baronet, in 1991.

== Fraser baronets, of Cromarty and Vale Avenue (1921) ==
- Sir John Malcolm Fraser, 1st Baronet (1878–1949)
- Sir Basil Malcolm Fraser, 2nd Baronet (1920–1992)
