= Sir Alexander Fraser of Dores =

Sir Alexander Fraser, 1st Baronet (c. 1607 – 1681), was principal physician to King Charles II of England. He had also accompanied Charles I during his imprisonment at Carisbrooke Castle. In 1667 Sir Edmund Berry Godfrey sued him over a debt of £30 for firewood and Fraser was briefly imprisoned. However the king had him released and Godfrey imprisoned and his bailiffs whipped. Godfrey was released after a hunger strike.

A son of Adam Fraser, he married Mary Carey, the fourth daughter of Sir Ferdinando Carey and his wife, Philippa Throckmorton. Their daughter, Mistress Carey Fraser (born c. 1660), became the wife of Charles Mordaunt, Earl of Monmouth and Peterborough.

Dr. Fraser was created Baronet Fraser, of Dores (or Doores, Durris, etc.), in the historic county of Kincardine, on 2 August 1673.

== See also ==
- Physician to the Queen
- Physician in ordinary

Baronetage of Nova Scotia
New creation	Baronet (of Dores); 1673–1681	Succeeded by Peter Fraser
