= Sir James Fraser, 2nd Baronet =

Scottish professor of surgery of the 20th century

Sir James Fraser Bt FRCS FRCSEd
- Born: 19 July 1924; Edinburgh, Scotland
- Died: 8 January 1997 (aged 72); Winchester, England
- Education: University of Oxford; University of Edinburgh
- Occupation: Surgeon
- Known for: Foundation Professor at Southampton University Medical School Postgraduate Dean of Medicine at the University of Edinburgh President of the Royal College of Surgeons of Edinburgh
- Spouse: Maureen Reay
- Parent(s): Sir John Fraser Bt, Agnes Govane Herald

Sir James David Fraser, 2nd Baronet, FRCS, FRCSEd (19 July 1924 – 8 January 1997) was a Scottish academic surgeon and a foundation professor at the medical school of Southampton, England, when it was established in 1969. He subsequently became Postgraduate Dean at the University of Edinburgh and served as President of the Royal College of Surgeons of Edinburgh from 1982 to 1985.

== Early life and education ==
Fraser was born in Edinburgh on 19 July 1924. He was the son of Sir John Fraser Bt, who had been Professor of Surgery and then Principal of the University of Edinburgh, and his wife Agnes Govane Herald. He went to school at Edinburgh Academy, where he was pipe-major in the school pipe band. From there he went to Magdalen College, Oxford, for medical pre-clinical studies. Here he gained a blue for golf and was captain of the golf team. He achieved this in spite of the residual disability from a childhood episode of osteomyelitis of the lower limb, which left him with a painful limp. He graduated BA in 1945.

From Oxford he returned to Edinburgh for undergraduate clinical studies in medicine at the University of Edinburgh. On 1 December 1947 he inherited his father's baronetcy, giving him the title Sir James Fraser, Bt. He graduated from Edinburgh with a Bachelor of Medicine, Bachelor of Surgery (MB ChB) degree in July 1948.

== Surgical career ==
In 1951 he became registrar in the professional surgical unit of Edinburgh Royal Infirmary under Sir James Learmonth, who had succeeded his father as Regius Professor of Surgery. He became a Fellow of the Royal College of Surgeons of Edinburgh in 1952 and three years later was appointed senior registrar in the urological unit at the Western General Hospital, Edinburgh. In 1958 to the surprise of friends and colleagues he resigned, opting to return to the Far East as surgeon to a district hospital in Sarawak, where he had sole responsibility for providing a surgical service to a large population in rural Borneo.

During this time he completed a master's thesis for which he was awarded the degree of Master of Surgery (ChM) in 1961. In 1963 he became senior lecturer in surgery in the University of Edinburgh department of clinical surgery under the Regius Professor Sir John Bruce. The administrative and teaching qualities which he demonstrated in this post led, in 1969, to his appointment to the Chair of Clinical Science (Surgery) in the newly established medical school of the University of Southampton. Here, with two other foundation professors, he built up an academic department of surgery and was heavily involved in the introduction of a new and innovative undergraduate curriculum. This involved the integration of pre-clinical and clinical components of the medical curriculum and its success was such that it was introduced in other UK medical schools.

He returned to Edinburgh taking up the appointment of Postgraduate Dean of Medicine in the University of Edinburgh in 1980, a post which he held until his retiral in 1989. In 1964 he was elected a member of the Harveian Society of Edinburgh and in 1982 he was elected a member of the Aesculapian Club. From 1982 to 1985 he was President of the Royal College of Surgeons of Edinburgh. During his tenure of office he promoted the introduction of higher surgical training assessments throughout the British Isles. These had been introduced in Edinburgh largely through the efforts of Professor J I P James and Professor John Gillingham in the face of opposition from other surgical colleges and the surgical trainees. The influence of the specialist surgical associations allowed Fraser to introduce these reforms. They have since become an established part of British higher surgical training.

== Family ==
In 1950 in Singapore Cathedral he married Maureen Reay, a doctor in the Women's Royal Air Force. They had two sons, Christopher and Iain; the latter held the baronetcy from 1997 until his death in 2019.

== Death and legacy ==
Fraser died in Winchester on 8 January 1997. He is commemorated by the Sir James Fraser Travelling Fellowship, which was endowed by his widow and is administered by the Royal College of Surgeons of Edinburgh.

== Arms ==
Coat of arms of the Fraser baronets of Tain
Crest A buck’s head erased Proper. Escutcheon Azure three cinquefoils Argent on a chief of the last three bears’ heads couped of the field muzzled of the second. Motto Furtachd Is Foir

Baronetage of the United Kingdom
Preceded by John Fraser	Baronet (of Tain); 1947–1997	Succeeded by Iain Fraser
