= Fraser baronets of Durris (1673) =

The Fraser baronetcy, of Durris (Dores) in the County of Kincardine, was created in the Baronetage of Nova Scotia on 2 August 1673 for Alexander Fraser. The title became extinct on the death of the second Baronet in 1729.

== Fraser baronets, of Durris (1673) ==
- Sir Alexander Fraser, 1st Baronet (c. 1607–1681)
- Sir Peter Fraser, 2nd Baronet (died 1729)
