= Sir John Fraser, 1st Baronet, of Tain =

British surgeon & professor (1885–1947)

Sir John Fraser Bt KCVO MC FRSE FRCSEd
- Born: 23 March 1885; Tain, Ross-shire, Scotland
- Died: 1 December 1947 (aged 62); Edinburgh, Scotland
- Known for: Establishing M. bovis as a cause of human TB. Fluid replacement in surgical shock. Ligation patent ductus arteriosus
- Title: Regius Professor of Clinical Surgery, University of Edinburgh. Principal, University of Edinburgh
- Spouse: Agnes Govane Herald

Academic background
- Education: Tain Royal Academy
- Alma mater: University of Edinburgh
- Thesis: An aetiological and pathological study of tuberculosis of the bones and joints (1912)

Academic work
- Discipline: Surgeon

Sir John Fraser, 1st Baronet, KCVO, MC, FRSE, FRCSE (23 March 1885 – 1 December 1947) was Regius Professor of Clinical Surgery at Edinburgh University from 1925 to 1944 and served as principal of the University of Edinburgh from 1944 to 1947.

His study of tuberculosis in children was to disprove the view of the Nobel prize winner Robert Koch that bovine tuberculosis did not play a major pathogenic role in human disease. The subsequent legislation led to the elimination of tuberculosis from milk supplies and resulted in a decline in incidence of bone and joint tuberculosis in children. In 1940 he was the first surgeon in Britain to ligate an uninfected patent ductus arteriosus.

== Early life and family ==
Fraser, whose parents both came from families of farmers, was born 23 March 1885 in Tain, Ross-shire. He was a few months old when his father died and he was raised as an only child by his mother. He went on to attend Tain Royal Academy. He then studied medicine, gaining admission to the medical faculty at the University of Edinburgh in 1902, graduating MB ChB with honours in 1907, winning the Allan Fellowship in Clinical Medicine and the gold medal for Clinical Surgery.

Fraser's son, Sir James Fraser, also became a surgeon and president of the Royal College of Surgeons of Edinburgh.

== Early medical career ==
Fraser served as house surgeon, first in the Royal Infirmary of Edinburgh and then at the Royal Hospital for Sick Children under Sir Harold Stiles, who was to have a powerful influence on Fraser's approach to surgical problems and scientific enquiry. He became a fellow of the Royal College of Surgeons of Edinburgh (FRCSEd) in 1910.

Fraser's scientific approach was manifest in his ChM dissertation, nominally on inguinal hernia in childhood but containing a detailed account of the descent of the testis which was based on 1000 cases he studied and which contained many original observations. The dissertation was awarded the Lister Prize for surgery.

== Research into tuberculosis ==
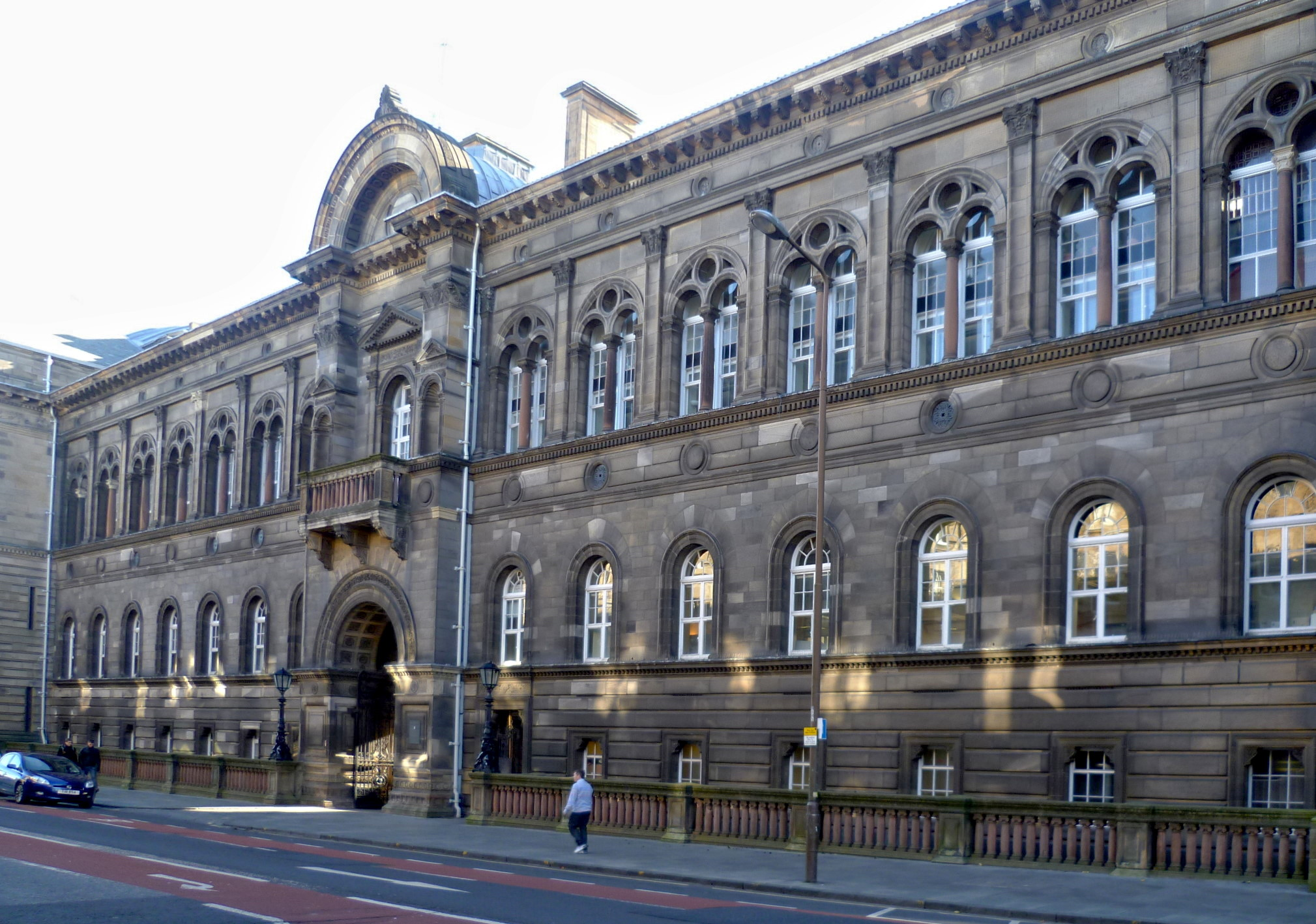
Edinburgh Medical School, Teviot Place, seen in 2010

For his MD thesis he studied the pathology and aetiology of tuberculosis of bones and joints. As Stiles had treated bone and joint TB in children by radical excision there was a large pathological collection available for study. He set out to investigate the claim by Robert Koch that the risk of humans acquiring TB by drinking milk from tuberculous cows was negligible. This view was not supported by laboratory experiments commissioned by a British royal commission. Fraser disproved Koch's view by demonstrating that 60% of the bones and joints he examined had the bovine form of the causative organism, Mycobacterium bovis. He went on to demonstrate the organism in local milk supplies and called for widespread pasteurisation of milk with increased regulation. The subsequent legislation led to the elimination of tuberculosis from milk supplies and resulted in a decline in incidence of bone and joint tuberculosis in children. Fraser's 1912 MD thesis was awarded a gold medal.

== First World War ==
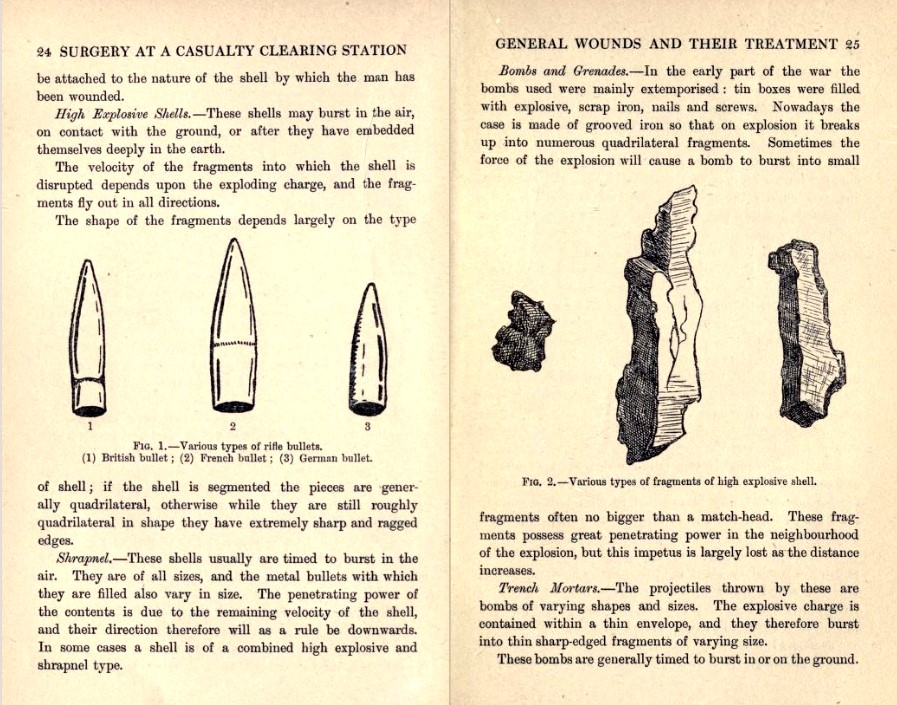
Pages from Surgery at a Casualty Clearing Station (1918), showing bullets and shrapnel, the drawings for which were mostly prepared by Mrs Fraser.

Fraser was commissioned in the Royal Army Medical Corps (RAMC) in August 1914. He served on the Western Front as Regimental Medical Officer in the First Cavalry Division and then, as surgeon to a casualty clearing station, he treated the wounded from the Battle of Loos. In 1916 he was wounded, was mentioned in dispatches and received the Military Cross.

During this wartime service, he wrote papers on treatment of abdominal wounds, on the treatment of gas gangrene with Eusol (a solution of hypochlorous acid) and on shock and its treatment with gum saline and other intravenous infusions. His studies on blood pressure in shock resulted in his being invited to join the Medical Research Committee's small group on surgical shock whose other members included distinguished physiologists like E H Starling, W M Bayliss and the future Nobel laureates C S Sherrington and Henry Dale.

Fraser's wartime observations were a major contribution to this committee who were to pioneer the scientific basis of fluid replacement in surgical shock.

While an army surgeon, he was successful in stitching up a gunshot wound of a heart.

He produced a book with Cuthbert Wallace about his medical experiences during the war, Surgery at a Casualty Clearing Station, which was published by A & C Black in 1918. Many of the illustrations were produced by Fraser's wife.

== Post-war medical career ==
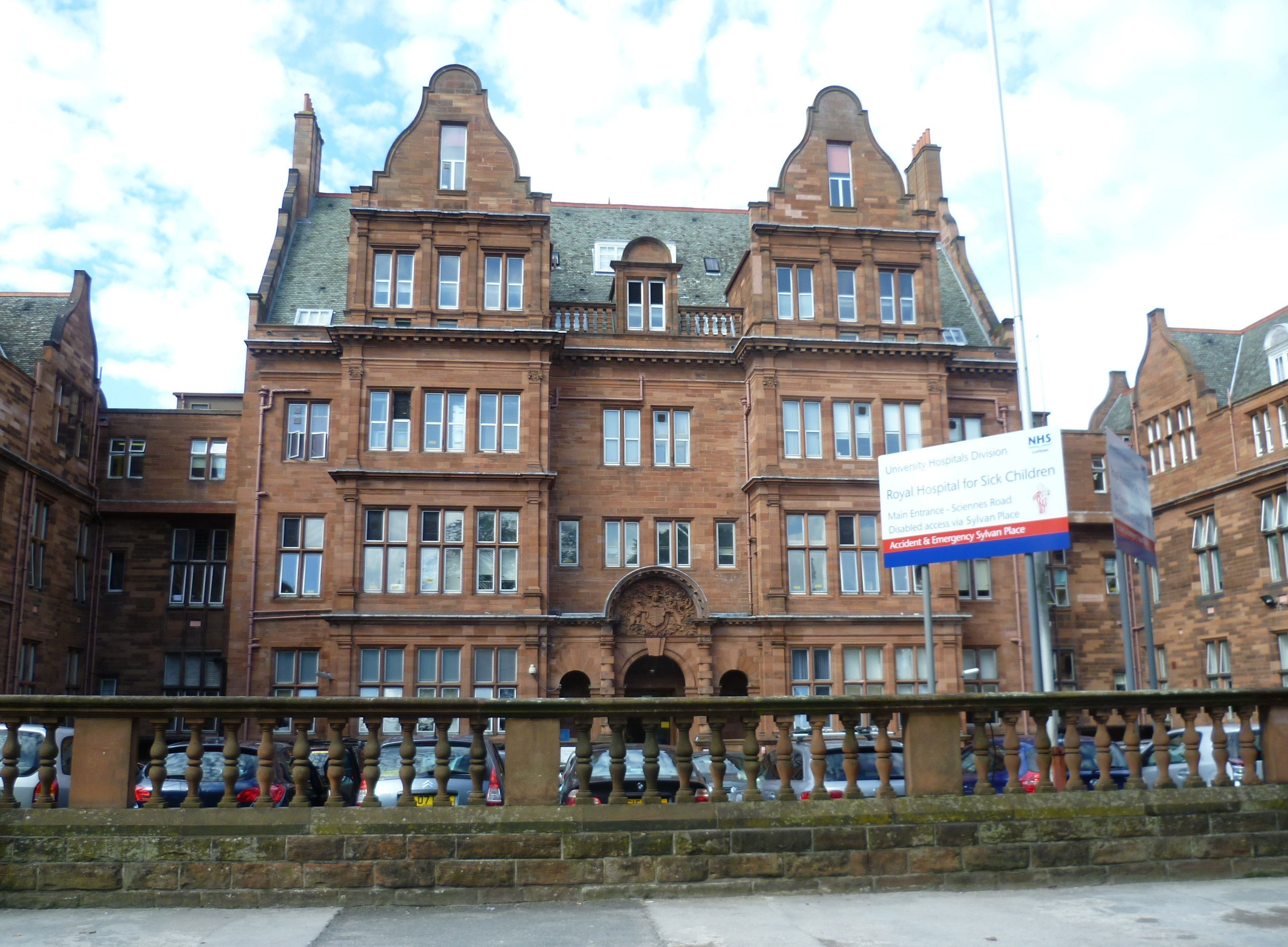
Royal Hospital For Sick Children, Sciennes, seen in 2011

On his return to Edinburgh, he was appointed surgeon to the Royal Hospital for Sick Children and the Royal Infirmary. In 1924 he was appointed to the Regius Chair of Clinical Surgery in succession to Sir Harold Stiles. He was elected a member of the Harveian Society of Edinburgh. He was elected a fellow of the Royal Society of Edinburgh in 1928, his proposers being Arthur Logan Turner, Harold Stiles, Arthur Robinson, James Hartley Ashworth and Sir James Alfred Ewing. In 1935, he left London for Southampton and on to New York on board the RMS 'Aquitania' setting out on a world tour. He travelled overland to Los Angeles and crossed the Pacific to Honolulu, to Samoa, Fiji, New Zealand and Australia. During the journey he visited hospitals and delivered lectures. His journal of the trip is held by Edinburgh University's Heritage Collections. In 1938 he was elected a member of the Aesculapian Club.

He chaired the Advisory Committee on Blood Transfusion which set up blood banks in Scotland in 1939.

Fraser's surgical career encompassed paediatric, abdominal, cardiothoracic and breast surgery and he wrote extensively on all of these. At a time when surgery on the heart was unthinkable, Fraser kept his interest in its possibility. On 19 October 1940 he became the first surgeon in the British Isles to successfully ligate an uninfected patent ductus arteriosus, two weeks after Oswald Tubbs had successfully ligated an infected ductus in London. Robert Gross had performed the first in Boston in 1938. Before retiring from surgery Fraser operated on 12 such cases. In addition, he had performed left cervical sympathectomy for angina. His experience with O'Shaughnessy's cardio-omentopexy surgery was less successful.

In October 1944 he was appointed principal of the University of Edinburgh. He was regarded as a major contributor of the golden age for Edinburgh surgery.

== Death and legacy ==
The workload strain of the Second World War contributed to his deteriorating health, and following his guided smooth transition of the university from war time to peacetime, Sir John Fraser died in Edinburgh on 1 December 1947.

== Honours ==
The Freedom of Tain was conferred upon Fraser in 1925. He was awarded an Honorary Fellowship by the American College of Surgeons in 1926.

He was Surgeon to the King in Scotland, and was created a Knight Commander of the Victorian Order (KCVO) in 1937. In the 1943 Birthday Honours he was made a Baronet with the creation of the Fraser Baronetcy, of Tain in the County of Ross. He was awarded the honorary degree of LL.D. by the University of Edinburgh in 1944.

Coat of arms of the Fraser baronets of Tain
Crest A buck’s head erased Proper. Escutcheon Azure three cinquefoils Argent on a chief of the last three bears’ heads couped of the field muzzled of the second. Motto Furtachd Is Foir

== Selected publications ==
- Tuberculosis of the bones and joints in children. London: A & C Black, 1914.
- Surgery at a Casualty Clearing Station (with Cuthbert Wallace). London: A & C Black, 1918.
- Surgery of Childhood. London: Arnold & Co, 1926.

Educational offices
Preceded by Thomas Henry Holland	Principals of Edinburgh University; 1944–1948	Succeeded by Edward Victor Appleton
Baronetage of the United Kingdom
New creation	Baronet (of Tain); 1943–1947	Succeeded by James Fraser
