= Charles William Chitty =

British colonial judge (1859–1932)

Sir Charles William Chitty
- Born: 8 August 1859
- Died: 17 March 1932 (aged 72); Torquay, Devon
- Education: King's College, Cambridge
- Occupations: Barrister and colonial judge
- Children: 2

Sir Charles William Chitty (8 August 1859 – 17 March 1932) was a British barrister and colonial judge in British India. He was judge of the Chief Court of Lower Burma; the Chief Court of Punjab, and the High Court of Calcutta, between 1903 and 1919.

== Early life and education ==
Chitty was born on 8 August 1859, the eldest son of General W. T. Chitty of the Bombay Staff Corps. He belonged to an old legal family many of whom had notable careers at the Bar and on the Bench. He was educated at Eton College and King's College, Cambridge where he was awarded his degree in 1883. He was called to Bar by the Inner Temple in 1884.

== Career ==
Chitty chose a career in India and enrolled as an advocate in the Bombay High Court where he practised for several years. In 1891, he was appointed Chief Judge of the Court of Small Causes, Bombay. From 1903 to 1904, he was judge of the Court of Lower Burma, Rangoon. In 1905, he was judge of the Chief Court of the Punjab, Lahore. In 1907 he was appointed puisne judge in the High Court of Judicature of Calcutta, was knighted in 1916, and remained on the bench until his retirement in 1919.

== Personal life and death ==
Chitty married Helen Mary Latham in 1893. They had a son and a daughter.

Chitty died on 17 March 1932 at Torquay, Devon, aged 72.

== Honours ==
Chitty was created a Knight Bachelor in the 1916 Birthday Honours.
