= Marshall Reid (rugby union) =

Scottish international rugby union player

- Born: Marshall Frederick Reid; 3 August 1864 Partick, Scotland
- Died: 20 March 1925 (aged 60) Epsom, England

Rugby union career
- Position: Centre
Youth career
- Loretto School
Amateur team(s)
Years	Team	Apps	(Points)
- West of Scotland
Provincial / State sides
Years	Team	Apps	(Points)
- Edinburgh District
- East of Scotland District
- 1886	Glasgow District; West of Scotland District		
International career
Years	Team	Apps	(Points)
1883	Scotland	2	(0)

Sir Marshall Reid (3 August 1864 – 20 March 1925) was a Scottish international rugby union player. He later became a prominent businessman, running the Bombay Company and was knighted in 1916.

== Rugby Union career ==
=== Amateur career ===
Although from Partick; at the time separate from Glasgow, Reid was schooled in Musselburgh at Loretto. Reid played rugby union for Loretto School and was capped by Scotland while still a schoolboy.

When Reid left school he played for West of Scotland.

=== Provincial career ===
He was called up for the Edinburgh District side for the 1882 provincial match against Glasgow District on 2 December 1882.

He played for East of Scotland District in their match against West of Scotland District in January 1883. At the point he played for Edinburgh and East of Scotland he was still a schoolboy.

When Reid began playing for the club side West of Scotland he then was picked for Glasgow District.

In 1886, he was picked by district side West of Scotland District to play the East of Scotland District in the 30 January 1886 trial match.

=== International career ===
He was called up to the Scotland squad for the Home Nations Championship and played Ireland at Belfast on 17 February 1883.

== Business career ==
He became the Managing Director of the Bombay Company and was knighted in 1916. He has a portrait in the National Portrait Gallery in London.

He later moved to the produce company Wyer and Hawke.
