= Fraser baronets =

Set index for Fraser baronets

There have been five baronetcies created for persons with the surname Fraser, one in the Baronetage of Nova Scotia and four in the Baronetage of the United Kingdom. As of 2026 four of the creations are extinct while one is extant.

- Fraser baronets of Durris (1673)
- Fraser baronets of Ledeclune (1806)
- Fraser baronets of Cromarty and Vale Avenue (1921)
- Fraser baronets of Tain (1943)
- Fraser baronets, of Dineiddwg (1961): see Baron Fraser of Allander
