= John Boraston =

Political organiser (1851–1920)

Sir John Boraston (24 June 1851 – 18 April 1920) was a British solicitor and political organizer who was chief agent for the Liberal Unionist Party from 1891 until its merger with the Conservative Party in 1912, when he became principal agent for the new combined party, a post which he held until his death in 1920. During the First World War, he was engaged in military recruiting work, for which he was knighted in 1916.
