= Shelley baronets of Michelgrove (1611) =

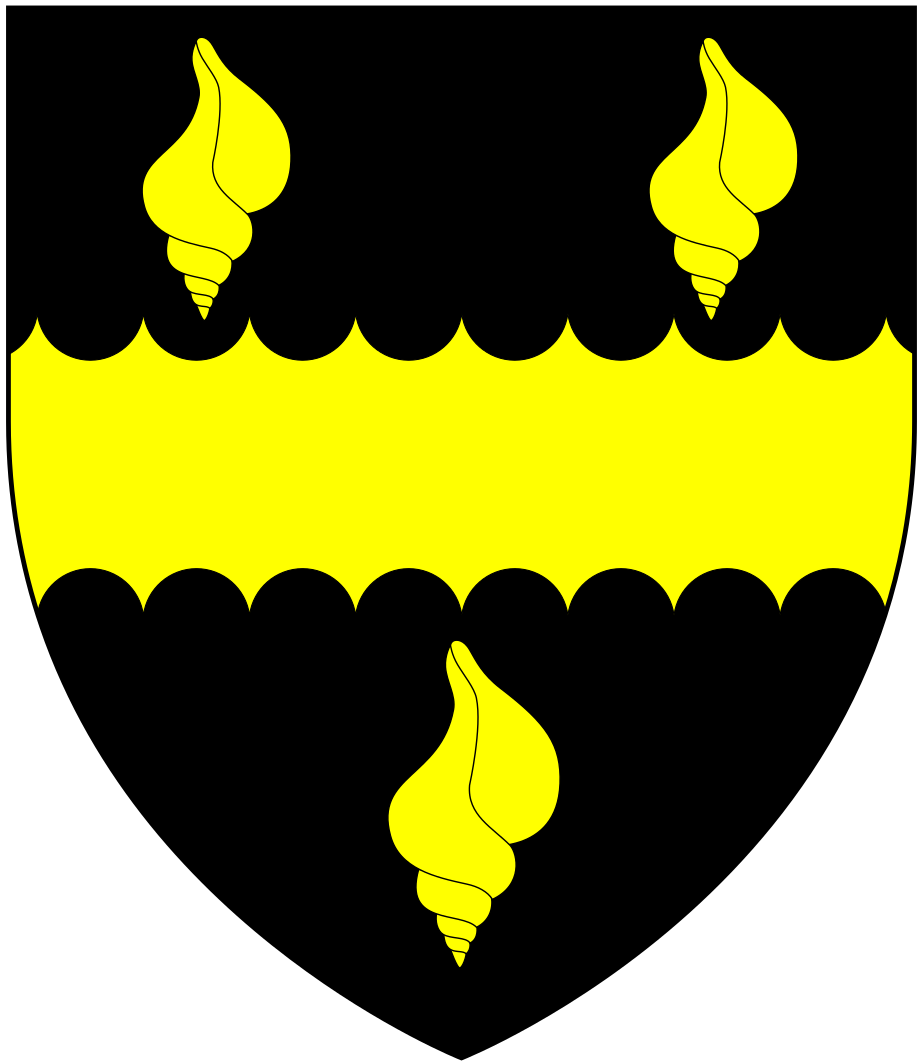
Arms of Shelley (of Michelgrove): Sable, a fesse engrailed between three whelks or

The Shelley baronetcy, of Michelgrove in the County of Sussex, was created in the Baronetage of England on 22 May 1611 for John Shelley.

The fourth Baronet represented Arundel and Lewes in the House of Commons while the fifth Baronet sat as a Member of Parliament for East Retford and Newark. Furthermore, the sixth Baronet represented Helston and Lewes and the seventh Baronet Gatton, Grimsby and Westminster. Their seat after 1880 was Shobrooke Park near Crediton in Devon.

== Shelley baronets, of Michelgrove (1611) ==
- Sir John Shelley, 1st Baronet (died c. 1644)
- Sir Charles Shelley, 2nd Baronet (died 1681) (grandson)
- Sir John Shelley, 3rd Baronet (died 1703) (son)
- Sir John Shelley, 4th Baronet (1692–1771) (son)
- Sir John Shelley, 5th Baronet (c. 1730–1783) (son)
- Sir John Shelley, 6th Baronet (1772–1852) (son)
- Sir John Villiers Shelley, 7th Baronet (1808–1867) (eldest son)
- Sir Frederic Shelley, 8th Baronet (1809–1869) (younger brother)
- Sir John Shelley, 9th Baronet (1848–1931) (son)
- Sir John Frederick Shelley, 10th Baronet (1884–1976) (son)
- Sir John Richard Shelley, 11th Baronet (born 1943) (grandson)

The heir presumptive is the present holder's brother, Thomas Henry Shelley (born 1945).
The title next falls to Nigel Antony Shelley (born 1948), a first cousin of the present holder and his brother. He has a son, Samuel Nicholas (born 1992).

== See also ==
- Shelley baronets of Castle Goring (1806)
- Viscount De L'Isle

Baronetage of England
Preceded by Knyvett baronets	Shelley baronets of Michelgrove; 22 May 1611	Succeeded by Savage baronets
