= Sir John Shelley, 7th Baronet =

English Tory landowner and politician

Sir John Shelley, Bt

Member of Parliament for Westminster
- In office 1852–1865 Serving with De Lacy Evans
- Preceded by: Charles Lushington; De Lacy Evans
- Succeeded by: Hon. Robert Grosvenor; John Stuart Mill

Member of Parliament for Great Grimsby
- In office 1831–1832 Serving with George Harris
- Preceded by: Charles Wood; George Harris
- Succeeded by: Henry Fitzroy; Lord Loughborough

Member of Parliament for Gatton
- In office 1830–1831 Serving with John Thomas Hope
- Preceded by: Joseph Neeld; Michael Prendergast
- Succeeded by: Viscount Pollington; Anthony John Ashley

Personal details
- Born: John Villiers Shelley; 18 March 1808
- Died: 28 January 1867 (aged 58)
- Spouse: Louisa Knight (after 1832)
- Relations: Sir Frederic Shelley, 8th Baronet (brother); Adolphus Shelley (brother)
- Children: Blanche Shelley
- Parent(s): Sir John Shelley, 6th Baronet; Frances Winkley
- Education: Charterhouse School

Sir John Villiers Shelley, 7th Baronet (18 March 1808 – 28 January 1867) was an English Tory landowner and politician.

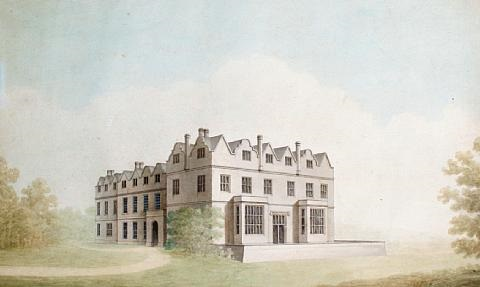
Maresfield Park c. 1850

== Early life ==
He was born the eldest son of Sir John Shelley, 6th Baronet and the former Frances Winkley (1787–1873), a noted diarist and close friend of the Duke of Wellington. Among his younger siblings were brothers Frederic Shelley and Adolphus Edward Shelley, the first Auditor-General in Hong Kong.

Shelley was educated at Charterhouse School.

== Career ==
He joined the Royal Horse Guards in 1825 as an ensign and rose to lieutenant in 1828. He transferred as a lieutenant to the 20th Foot in 1830, went onto half-pay with the 60th Foot in 1831 and retired in 1832. He served as lieutenant-colonel of the 46th Middlesex Rifle Volunteers from 1861 to his death.

He was elected at the 1830 general election as a Member of Parliament (MP) for Gatton in Surrey, then at the 1831 general election as an MP for Great Grimsby, but did not contest the seat at the 1832 general election.

He did not stand again until he unsuccessfully contested the 1841 general election in East Sussex. On the death of the 6th Baronet on 28 March 1852 he became the 7th Baronet Shelley of Michelgrove, inheriting Maresfield Park in Sussex.

Shelley returned to the Commons after a twenty-year absence when he was elected at the 1852 general election as a Member of Parliament (MP) for Westminster, where he was re-elected in 1857 and 1859. He did not stand again in Westminster at the 1865 general election, when he contested Bridgwater, but without success.

== Personal life ==
In 1832, Shelley married Louisa Knight, the daughter of Rev. Samuel Johnes Knight of Henley Hall, Shropshire. They had an only daughter:

- Blanche Henrietta Shelley (1835–1898), who married Hervey Charles Pechell, a brother to Adm. Mark Robert Pechell and son of the Rev. Horace Robert Pechell and Lady Caroline Mary Kerr (a daughter of Lord Mark Kerr and Charlotte Kerr, 3rd Countess of Antrim), in 1874.

He died of gout in 1867 and is buried in the graveyard of Maresfield church. Upon his death, the baronetcy passed to his younger brother Frederic, although he bequeathed Maresfield Hall to Blanche, who married Hervey Charles Pechell in 1874 and never took up residence. Pechell left the Maresfield Park estate to Count Alexander Münster in 1899. Münster, who married Lady Muriel Hay (a daughter of George Hay-Drummond, 12th Earl of Kinnoull, had been living at Maresfield while Pechell and Blanche resided in Bellagio in Italy.

Parliament of the United Kingdom
Preceded by Joseph Neeld; Michael Prendergast	Member of Parliament for Gatton; 1830–1831; With: John Thomas Hope	Succeeded by Viscount Pollington; Anthony John Ashley
Preceded by Charles Wood; George Harris	Member of Parliament for Great Grimsby; 1831–1832; With: George Harris	Succeeded by Henry Fitzroy; Lord Loughborough
Preceded by Charles Lushington; De Lacy Evans	Member of Parliament for Westminster; 1852–1865; With: De Lacy Evans 1846–1865	Succeeded by Hon. Robert Grosvenor; John Stuart Mill
Baronetage of England
Preceded by John Shelley	Baronet (of Michelgrove); 1852–1867	Succeeded by Frederic Shelley
