= Sir Frederic Shelley, 8th Baronet =

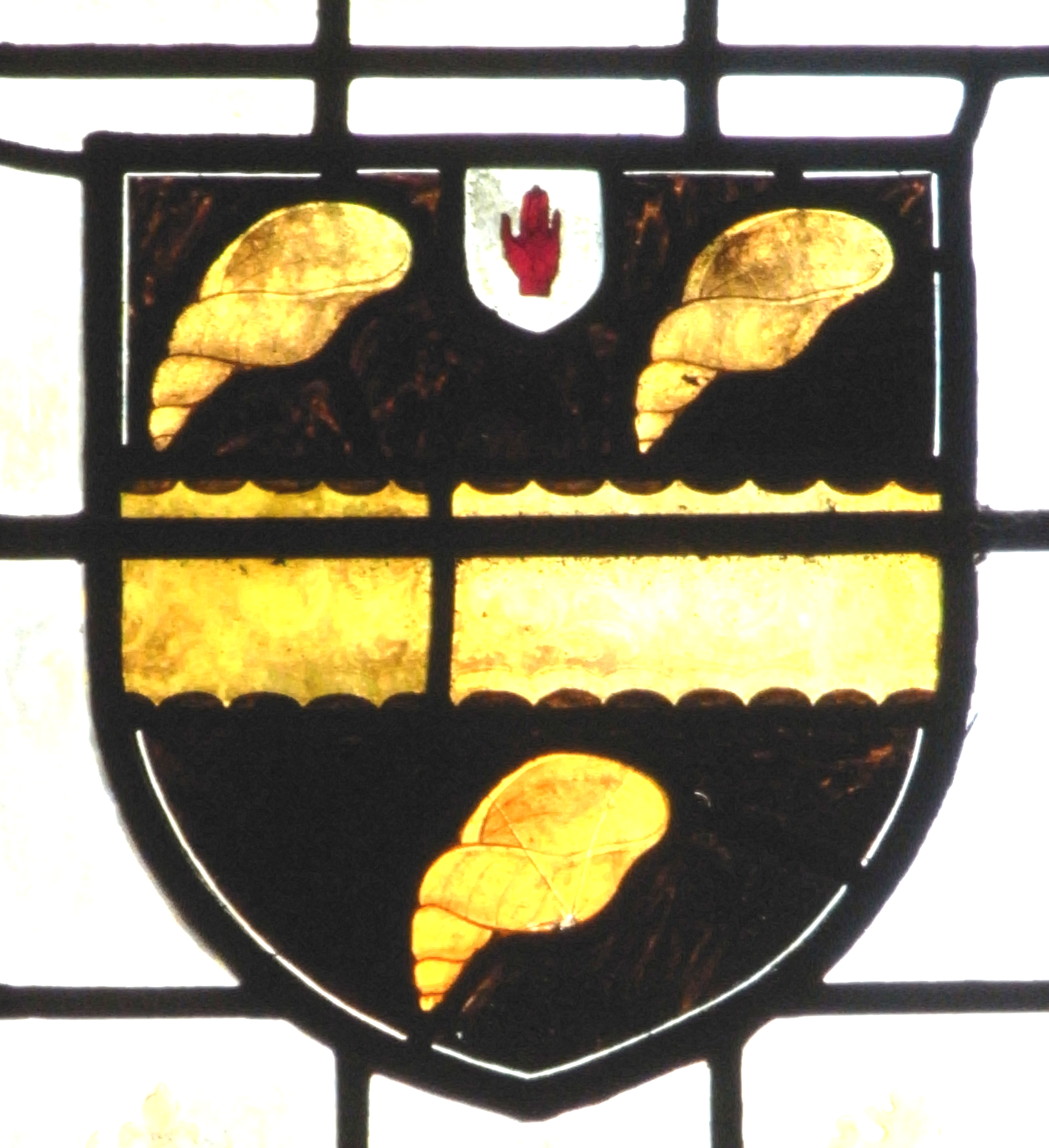
Canting arms of Shelley Baronets of Michelgrove: Sable, a fesse engrailed between three whelk shells or with inescutcheon of the Red Hand of Ulster. Detail from heraldic window c. 1924 in Crediton Church, Devon, south wall of south transept, bequeathed by Rev. W. M. Smith-Dorrien (d. 1924), Vicar of Crediton

Reverend Sir Frederic Shelley, 8th Baronet (1809–1869), of Shobrooke Park, Crediton, Devon, was a cleric and landowner.

== Origins ==
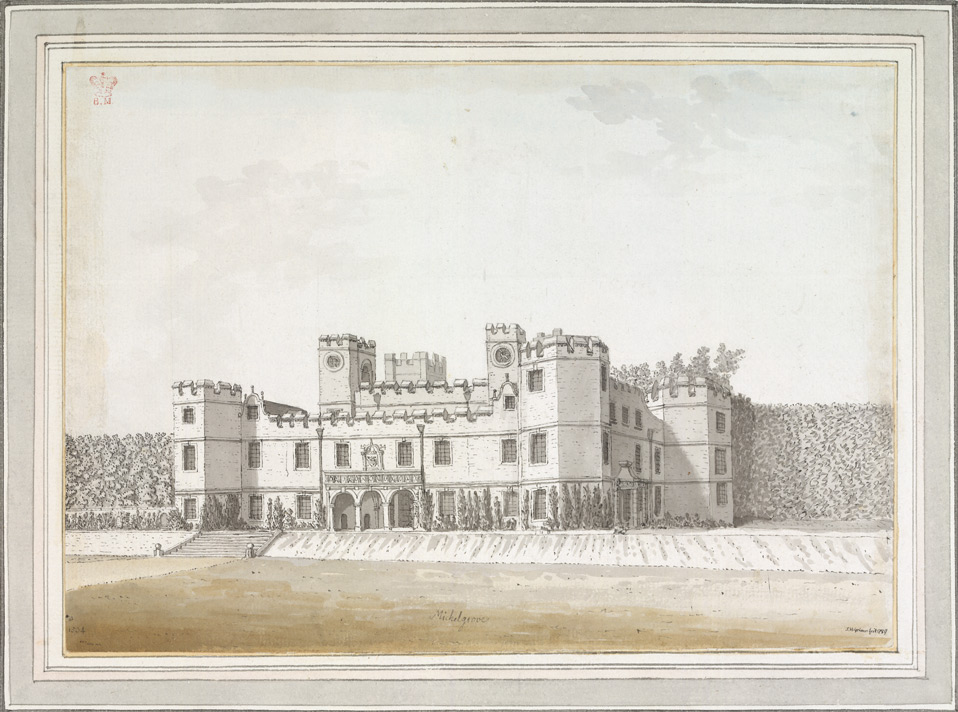
Michelgrove House, near Clapham, West Sussex. 1789 watercolour by Samuel Hieronymus Grimm (1733–1794)

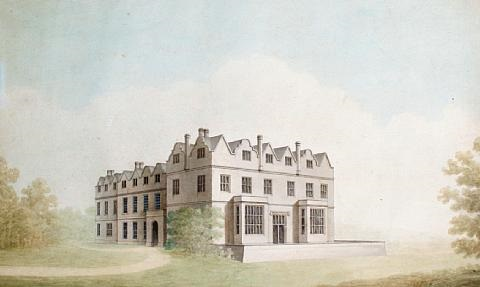
Maresfield Park, Sussex. Watercolour by Benjamin Dean Wyatt (1775–1850)

He was the second son of Sir John Shelley, 6th Baronet (1772–1852) of Michelgrove and Maresfield Park, Sussex, by his wife Frances Winckley, daughter and heiress of Thomas Winckley, of Brockholes, Lancashire.

== Career ==
He began his career in the Royal Navy, from which he retired in 1833, after twelve years' active service in all parts of the world as a Lieutenant. Having decided on adopting the clerical profession, he was ordained deacon in 1835, and priest in 1836. In about 1837 he was appointed by Richard Hippisley Tuckfield (1774-1844) of Shobrooke Park near Crediton, Devon, as curate of Posbury Chapel, near Shobrooke, which he had built in 1835 to cater for the growing congregation of Holy Cross Church, Crediton. In about 1839 he was also appointed to succeed Mr Marriott as head teacher of St Luke's teacher training college at Posbury, founded next to the chapel in about 1836 by Lady Hippisley (née Charlotte Mordaunt), Sir Richard's wife, a pioneer in the education of deaf and dumb children. He lived with the students at Priestcott, Posbury. In 1845 he married his patron's niece Charlotte Martha Hippisley (1812–1893), sister of John Hippisley of Ston Easton Park, and following his marriage he moved away from Posbury having been appointed as rector of Bere Ferrers with Beer Alston, Devon in 1844, by the Earl of Mount Edgcumbe.

== Succession to baronetcy ==
He succeeded to the baronetcy 26 January 1867, at the age of 58, following the death of his elder brother Sir John Villiers Shelley, 7th Baronet (1808–1867), MP, of Maresfield Park. Maresfield Park, however, was left by the 7th Baronet to his only daughter Blanche.

== Marriage and progeny ==
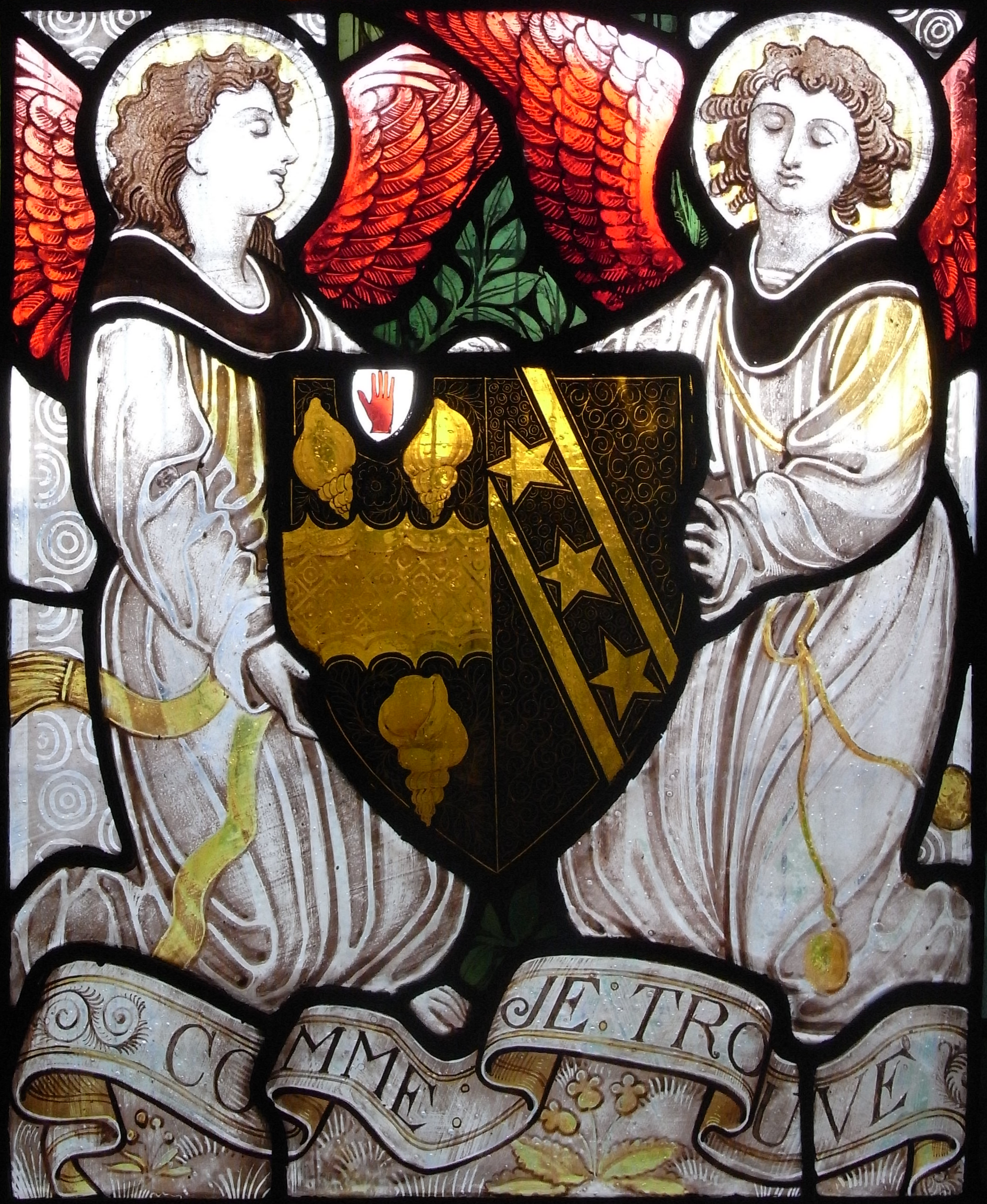
Arms of Rev. Sir Frederic Shelley, 8th Baronet (1809–1869): Sable, a fesse engrailed between three whelk shells or with inescutcheon of the Red Hand of Ulster, impaling the arms of his wife Charlotte Martha Hippisley (1812–1893): Sable, three mullets pierced in bend between two bendlets or, with on a scroll below motto of Shelley: Comme je trouve ("As I find"). Detail from memorial stained glass window in north wall of north aisle of Shobrooke Church, Devon

On 4 February 1845, he married Charlotte Martha Hippisley (1812–1893), daughter of the Rev. Henry Hippisley (1776–1838), of Lambourne Place, Berkshire (whose maternal grandfather was John Hippisley Coxe (1715–1769), builder of the mansion Ston Easton Park in Somerset) by his wife Anne Rollinson. He left progeny two sons and one daughter, including:

- Sir John Shelley, 9th Baronet (1848–1931), who inherited Shobrooke Park from his mother's childless first cousin John Henry Hippisley (1801–1880), Sheriff of Devon in 1859 and a Deputy Lieutenant of Somerset.

== Death and burial ==
He died at Shobrooke Park aged 60 on 19 March 1869 and was buried in the churchyard of St Swithun's Church, Shobrooke. The inscription on his gravestone is as follows:

"Sir Frederick Shelley Eighth Baronet. Twenty four years Rector of Bere Ferrers. Born May 3, 1809. Died March 19, 1869. Also of his wife Charlotte Martha Shelley. Born August 10 AD 1812. Died May 20, 1893. Blessed are the dead which die in Christ".

== Sources ==
- Burke's Genealogical and Heraldic History of the Landed Gentry, 15th Edition, ed. Pirie-Gordon, H., London, 1937, pp. 1119–20, pedigree of Hippisley of Ston Easton

Baronetage of England
Preceded by John Shelley	Baronet (of Michelgrove); 1867–1869	Succeeded by John Shelley
