= Blanche Henrietta Johnes Shelley =

British photographer and writer (1835–1898)

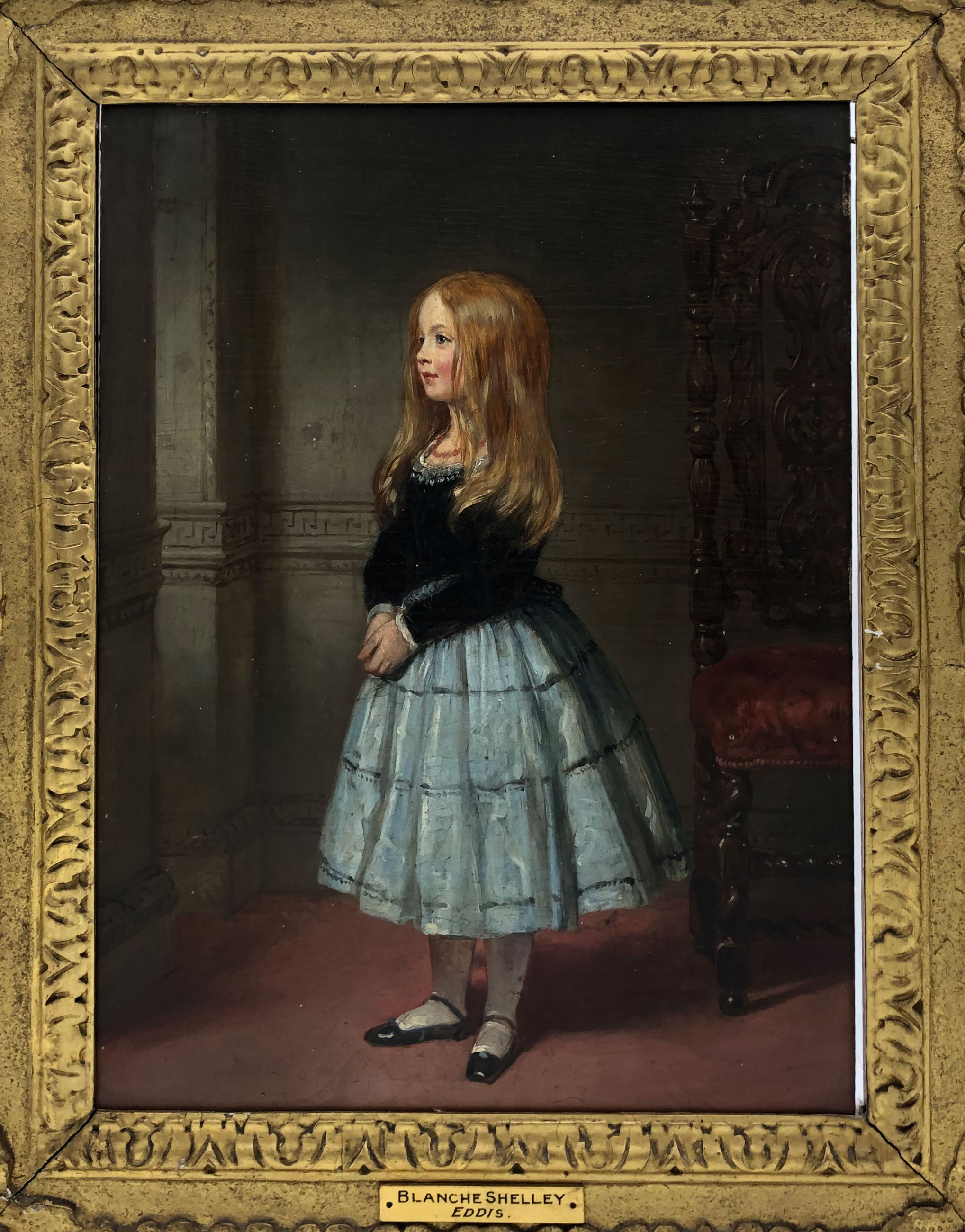
- portrait by Eden Upton Eddis
- Born: 15 December 1835; Upper Brook Street
- Died: 12 April 1898 (aged 62)
- Occupation: Photographer, writer
- Spouse(s): Hervey Charles Pechell
- Parent(s): Sir John Shelley, 7th Baronet; Louisa Elizabeth Anne Knight

Blanche Henrietta Johnes Shelley Pechell (15 December 1835 – 12 April 1898) was a British photographer and writer.

Blanche Henrietta Johnes Shelley was the daughter of Sir John Villiers Shelley, 7th Baronet and Louisa Elizabeth Anne Knight. She was a distant relative of photographic pioneer Henry Fox Talbot and her family became involved in early experiments with photography. Her only surviving photograph, Ferns and Daffodil, dates from 1854.

She married genealogist Hervey Charles Pechell in 1874.

In 1876, she published a children's story called Fernseed; or, The Woodland Fairy.

She inherited Maresfield Park from her father, on her death leaving it to her husband Hervey Pechell, who died in December the same year, and subsequently bequeathed it to their friend Count Alexander Münster.
