= Posbury =

Hamlet in Devon, England

Coordinates: 50.7620°N 3.6906°W

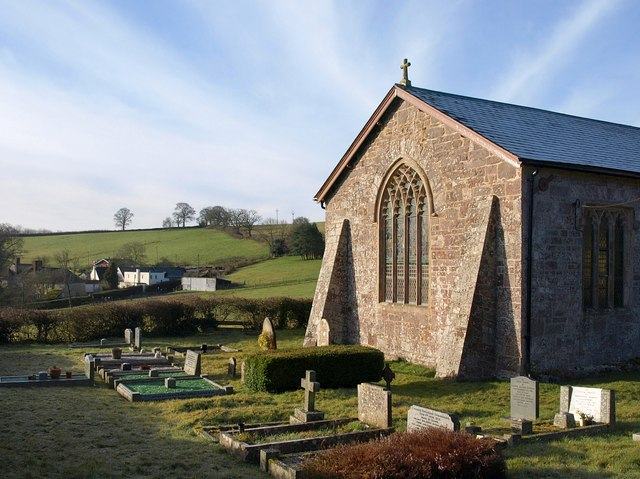
Right: East end of St Luke's Chapel, Posbury, built in 1835; left: in background, Posbury House, in 2014 home to The Community of the Franciscan Servants of Jesus & Mary

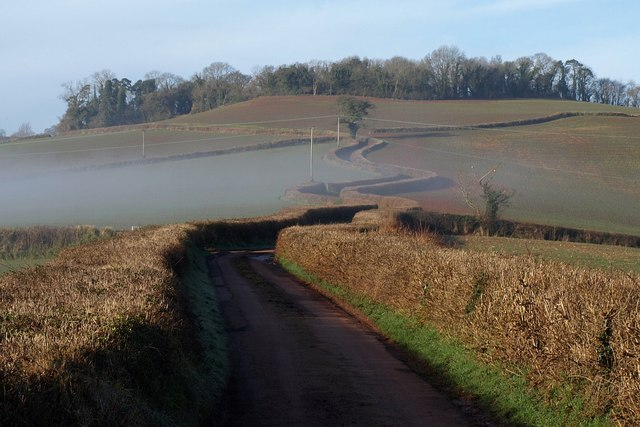
Posbury Clump

Posbury is an ancient estate in Devon, now a hamlet, situated about 2 miles south-west of Crediton and 2 miles north of Tedburn St Mary and 1 mile west of the small hamlet of Venny Tedburn.

== Posbury Hill Fort ==
Posbury Hill Fort is an unexcavated Iron Age Hill fort, located three miles south-west of Crediton, Devon. It consists today of an incomplete earthwork partly enclosing a hilltop 180 metres above sea level. A modern road cuts across the north of the hilltop. Just to the south of the hamlet there are the remains of an early Roman road, that ran from the newly discovered Roman fort, near Colebrooke, in an eastward direction towards Crediton. W. G. Hoskins states that this is a likely site of Posentesburg, a battle site from 661 AD in which Cenwalh, the King of Wessex, moved the native Briton tribes out of middle Devon to the coast. Today the hill fort's defences are best seen from the bridle path, just to the north of the convent.

== Manor of Posbury ==
The manor of Posbury is first recorded as held by the de Posbury family. On the failure of the male line, a daughter and sole heiress Eleanor de Posbury brought the manor to the family of her husband, a member of the Pollard family of Way, St Giles in the Wood, Devon.

On 5 April 1581, John Bremridge did homage and service to George Pollard, then the Lord of the Manor of Posbury-Bradleigh, and duly recovered seizin of his inheritance of Bremridge, in the parish of Sandford. By an Inquisition post mortem dated 1599 it appears that he died "seized of one capital messuage or tenement called Bremridge, with three orchards, two gardens, seventy acres of land, four of meadow and half an acre of wood, within the parish and hundred of Crediton, all held of Richard Pollard and John Hele, serjeant-at-law, as parcel of the Manor of Posbury Bradleigh, by the eighth part of a knight's fee and by the annual rent of seven shillings and five pence."

This branch of the Pollard family appears to be that seated at Langley, Yarnscombe, Devon, in which Richard Pollard (died 1626) was the son and heir of George Pollard. Sir John Heale (d.1608) of Wembury, Serjeant at Law, was Recorder of Exeter 1592-1605 and was MP for Exeter. His monument survives in Wembury Church.

=== Posbury House ===
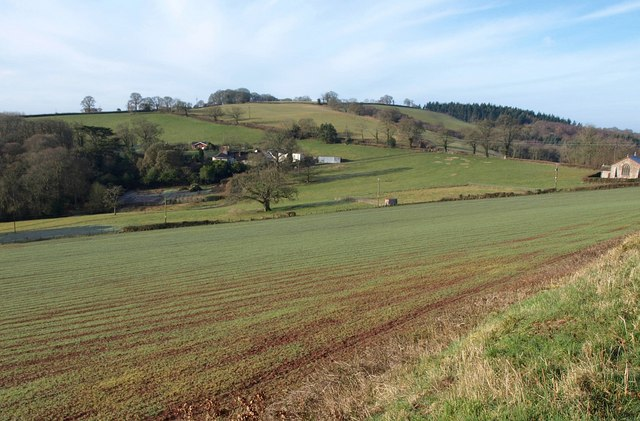
Posbury House, in 2014 home to The Community of the Franciscan Servants of Jesus & Mary. The east end of St Luke's Chapel is visible at far right

Posbury House was the historic centre of the settlement, long the property of the Tuckfield family, whose early home was here or at adjacent Venny Tedburn or at nearby Tedburn St Mary. John Tuckfield (fl.1550) of Exeter was a wealthy woolen-cloth merchant and served as Mayor of Exeter 1549–50. His son was John Tuckfield (1555-1630) of Teadburn (as the monument in Holy Cross Church, Crediton erected by his son records), who purchased the estate of Little Fulford (later renamed Shobrooke House), which thenceforth he made his seat, in the parishes of Shobrooke and Crediton, situated 4 miles north-east of Posbury. In 1797 the Devon topographer Rev. John Swete visited Little Fulford and recorded in his journal that the "large woollen manufactory" of the Tuckfield family "has ever since subsisted in these parts". Richard Hippisley (1774-1844), a distant cousin who later adopted the surname Tuckfield, inherited the Tuckfield estates and not only rebuilt Shobrooke House in the new Italianate style, but also in 1835 built St Luke's Chapel at Posbury.

==== St Francis's Convent ====
Posbury House in 2014 is home to an Anglican Franciscan nunnery known as The Community of the Franciscan Servants of Jesus & Mary founded in Stepney, London, in 1935 by Grace Emily Costin who took the name "Mother Teresa". It moved in 1937 to the Isle of Wight and again in 1942, to escape the danger of enemy bombardment during World War II, to Posbury House, which they renamed The House of St Francis. During the War the community started to host retreats for candidates for ordination as priests in the Diocese of Exeter, which practice was only discontinued shortly before 2014. The house has its own chapel on site. By 2014 the community had dwindled in number, and the practice has ceased of the sisters working in the local community in areas connected with spiritual matters.

== St Luke's Chapel ==
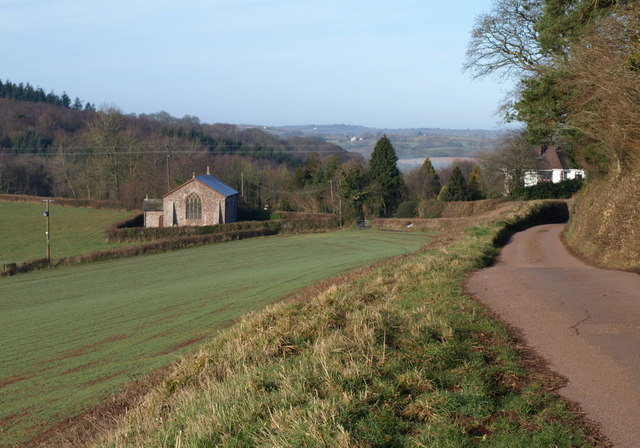
St Luke's Chapel, Posbury, built in 1935

St Luke's Chapel was built in 1835 by Richard Hippisley Tuckfield of Shobrooke House in order to supplement the capacity of nearby Holy Cross Church, Crediton, which had become overwhelmed by the number of its parishioners generated by the prosperous and expanding town of Crediton. The governors of Crediton Church took legal advice as to whether it was lawful for them to fund the building of a second church. An Act of Parliament passed during the reign of King William IV (1830-1837) relaxed the rules governing the building of additional churches to cater for populous parishes. The requirements of the Act, which sought to avoid parish churches competing for scarce parishioners and funding, were that the existing parish church should have a specified minimum number of parishioners, that site of the proposed new church should be at least two miles distant from the parish church, that at least three hundred persons were resident within one mile of the new church and that a maintenance trust-fund should be established. Rev. Samuel Rowe, rector of Crediton Church, declared his Sunday services to be attended by between seven and eight hundred, and the conditions were thus met. The new chapel, dedicated to St Luke, was built at Posbury in 1836 on a site owned by Mr Tuckfield, formerly called "Blackadown", alias "Pethams Postbury". R. H. Tuckfield established the required maintenance fund, in the sum of £1,000 plus £5 for every £100 in building costs. The land, chapel building and fund were transferred into the legal ownership of trustees appointed for the purpose, prominent members of the local gentry namely Sir Stafford Northcote, 7th Baronet (1762-1851), of Pynes, Newton St Cyres, Sir Humphrey Davie, 10th Baronet (1775-1846)Bart of Creedy House, Sandford, James Wentworth Buller (1798-1865), of Downes House, MP for Exeter (1830-1835) and for North Devon (1857-1865) and John Sillifant Esq. The chapel was consecrated on 18 October 1836 by Henry Phillpotts, Bishop of Exeter, and at the same time the land and building were regranted to the ownership of Mr Tuckfield, with the maintenance fund alone remaining in the ownership of the trustees. Mr Tuckfield became owner of the advowson, and thus patron of the living, which office is still held today by his descendant Sir John Richard Shelley, 11th Baronet (born 1943), of Shobrooke House. He appointed as the first curate Reverend Frederic Shelley (1809–1869), later 8th of the Shelley Baronets, who in 1845 married Charlotte Martha Hippisley (1812-1893), Sir Richard Hippisley's niece, and whose eldest son Sir John Shelley, 9th Baronet (1848–1931) in 1880 inherited Shobrooke Park and all his other estates including Posbury.

== Posbury School ==
At about the same time as Richard Hippisley Tuckfield was building St Luke's Chapel, his wife Charlotte Mordaunt (1777-1848), daughter of Sir John Mordaunt, 7th Baronet, was building a small school in the lane opposite. She had an "ardent zeal for the training of the deaf and dumb and of school masters for the poor" (as commented the Educational pioneer Sir Thomas Dyke Acland, 11th Baronet (1809-1898), both of whose wives were Charlotte's nieces). Charlotte had developed an interest in teaching the deaf and dumb after a visit to her friend Grace Fursdon at Fursdon House, where she met her deaf and dumb protégée, who aroused her sympathy and interest. She travelled to Paris to study the teaching methods at the Institut National de Jeunes Sourds de Paris, the institution for the deaf and dumb run by the Venerable Abbe Sicard (d.1822). On her return home she sought out two similarly affected children and taught them herself. She was successful in her methods and was instrumental in establishing a school in Alphington Road, in Exeter, the precursor of the present Royal West of England School for the Deaf. She wrote a series of articles later published in a book entitled "Education for the People". In 1838 Sir Thomas Acland established the Exeter Diocesan Education Committee, the first in Great Britain, which by 1840 had established St Luke's Teachers' Training College in Cathedral Close, Exeter. Thus there was little further need for Posbury School which closed and was for a while used as a Sunday School. In the 1920s, by which time it was serving only as a storage shed, it was demolished and its building stone served to make buttresses for the walls of St Luke's Chapel.

== Sources ==
- www.posbury.org.uk
- John Marius Wilson's Imperial Gazetteer of England and Wales 1870-72, Posbury
