= Little Fulford =

Historic estate in Devon, England

Coordinates: 50.800°N 3.627°W

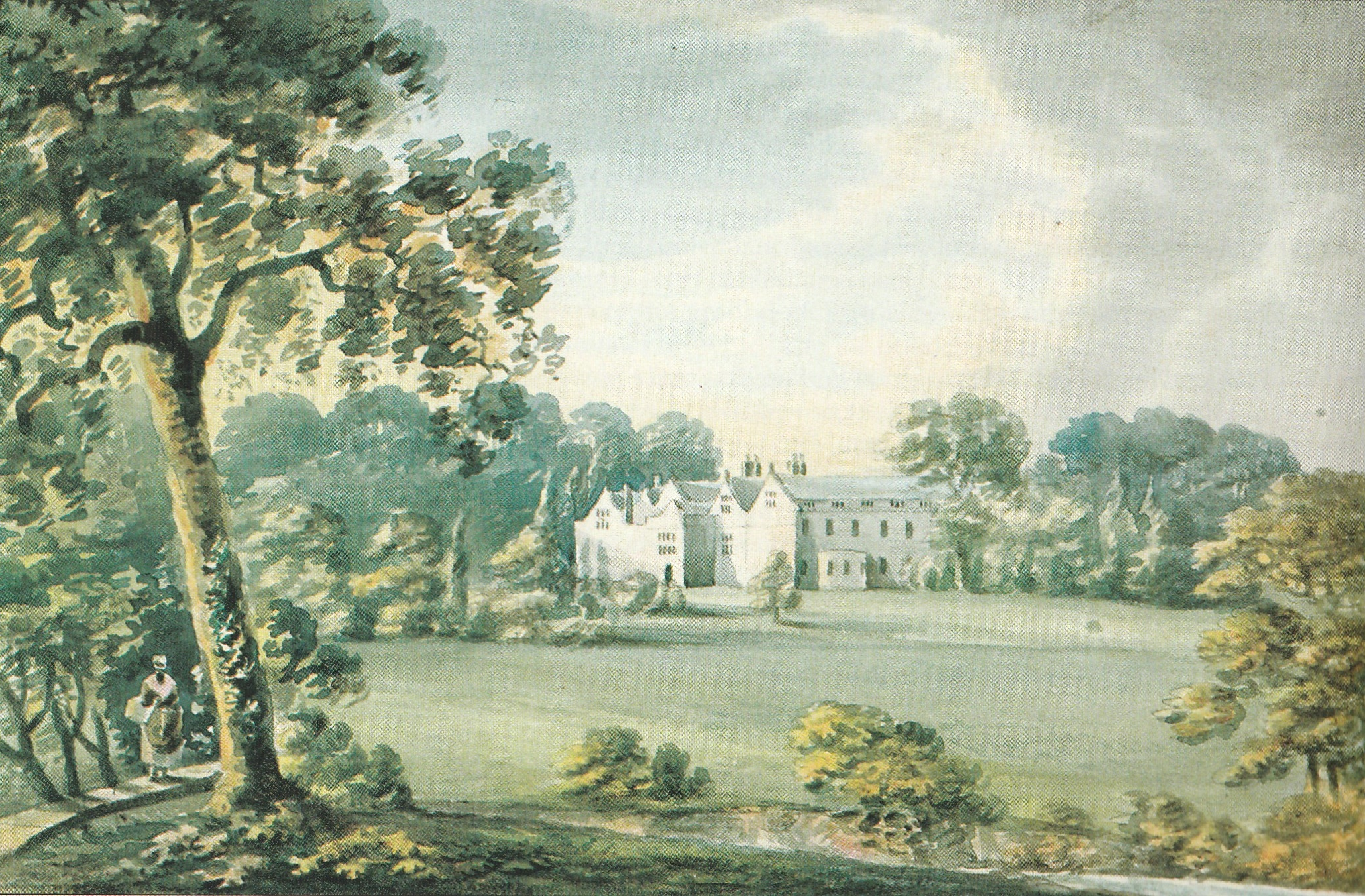
Little Fulford House, Shobrooke, near Crediton, Devon, seat of Henry Tuckfield, Esq. 1797 Watercolour by Rev. John Swete (1752–1821). Later renamed Shobrooke House, demolished pre-1844 and rebuilt nearby in Italianate style. The stream in the foreground, over which a woman is crossing on a plank bridge to left, was dammed-up in the 19th century landscaping to form a series of ornamental lakes, which survive

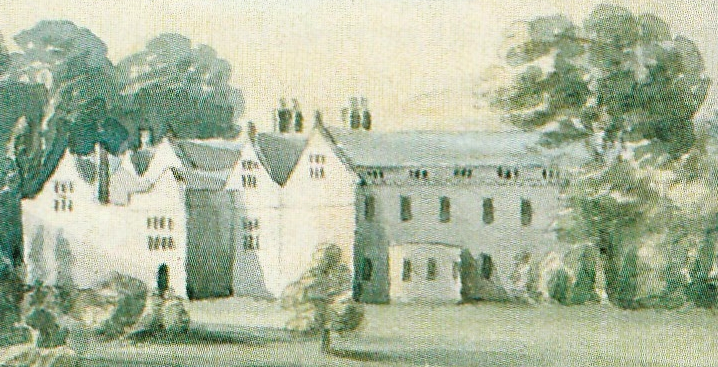
Little Fulford House in 1797, viewed from south-west, detail from watercolour by John Swete. The west front (left) is Elizabethan, as built by Sir William Peryam (1534–1604); the south front (right, with bow window) is a Georgian alteration. Swete found the juxtaposition of the two styles "widely incongruous"

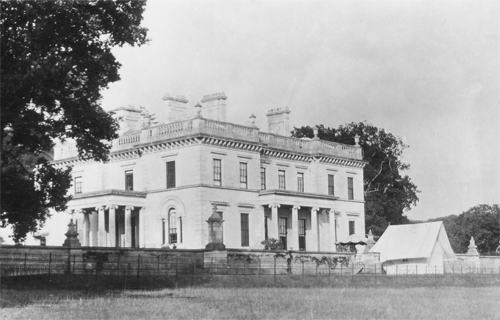
Shobrooke Park, built by Richard Hippisley Tuckfield (1774–1844) on or near the site of Little Fulford House which he demolished. Destroyed by fire 23 January 1945 and later demolished

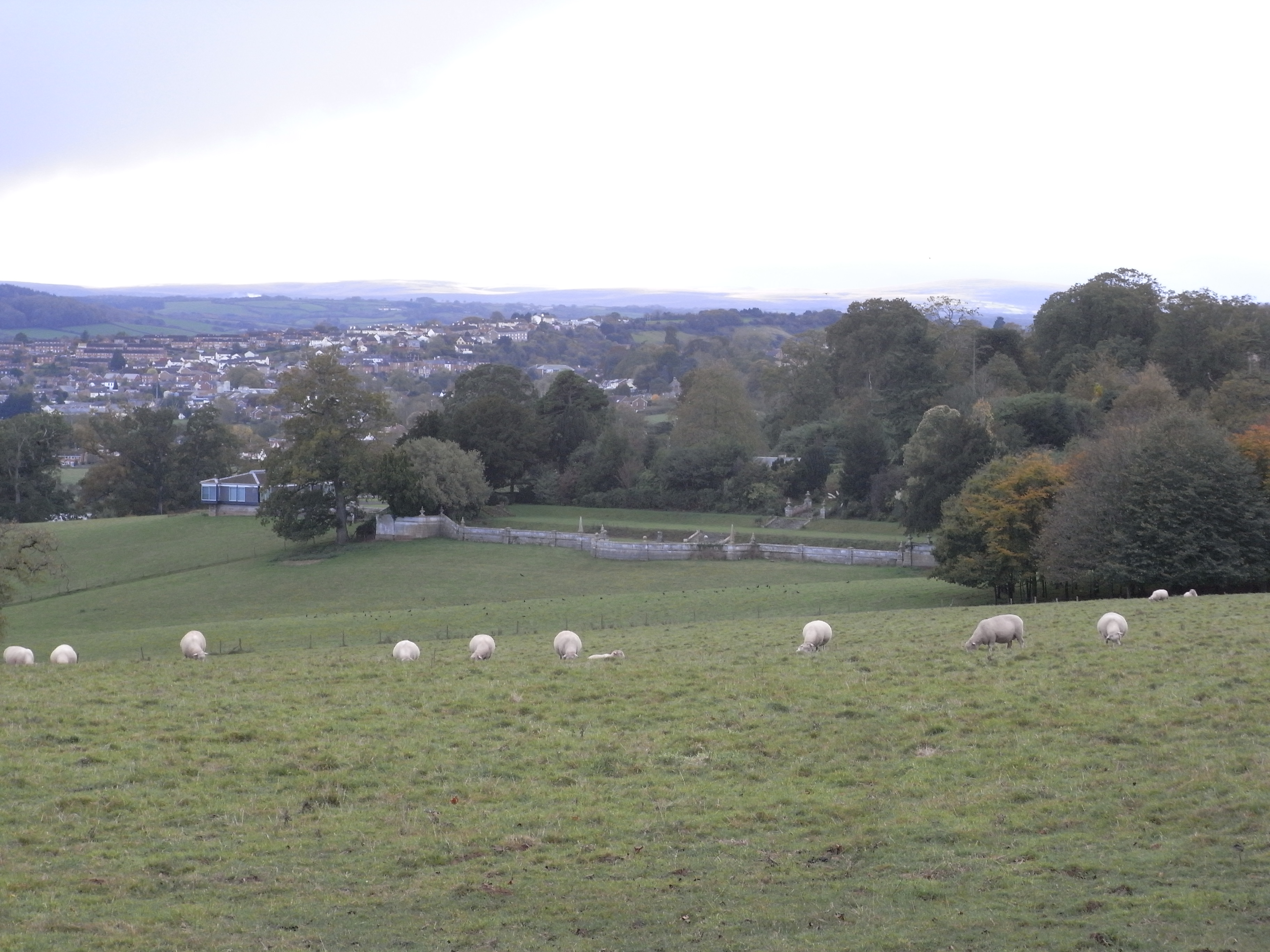
Site of the former mansion Shobrooke House, viewed from north-east, with suburbs of Crediton beyond. The mansion stood on the spot now occupied by the single storey modern bungalow at left. In centre is the long ornamental wall of the "Sundial Terrace". On the far horizon are the hills of Dartmoor 20 miles to the south-west

Little Fulford was a historic estate in the parishes of Shobrooke and Crediton, Devon. It briefly share ownership before 1700 with Great Fulford, in Dunsford, about 9 miles (14 km) to the south-west. The Elizabethan mansion house originally called Fulford House was first built by Sir William Peryam (1534–1604), a judge and Lord Chief Baron of the Exchequer. It acquired the diminutive epithet "Little" in about 1700 to distinguish it from Fulford House, Dunsford and was at some time after 1797 renamed Shobrooke Park (the name of both the house and the landscape within which it sits), to remove all remaining confusion between the two places. Peryam's mansion was demolished in 1815 and a new house erected on a different site away from the River Creedy. This new building was subsequently remodelled in 1850 in an Italianate style. It was destroyed by fire in 1945 and demolished, with only the stable block remaining today. The landscaped park survives, open on the south side to the public by permissive access, and crossed in parts by public rights of way, with ancient large trees and two sets of ornate entrance gates with a long decorative stone multiple-arched bridge over a large ornamental lake. The large pleasure garden survives, usually closed to the public, with walled kitchen garden and stone walls and balustrades of terraces. The park and gardens are Grade II listed in the National Register of Historic Parks and Gardens. The estate was the home successively of the families of Peryam, Tuckfield, Hippisley and lastly the Shelley baronets, in whose possession it remains today.

== Descent ==
=== Peryam ===
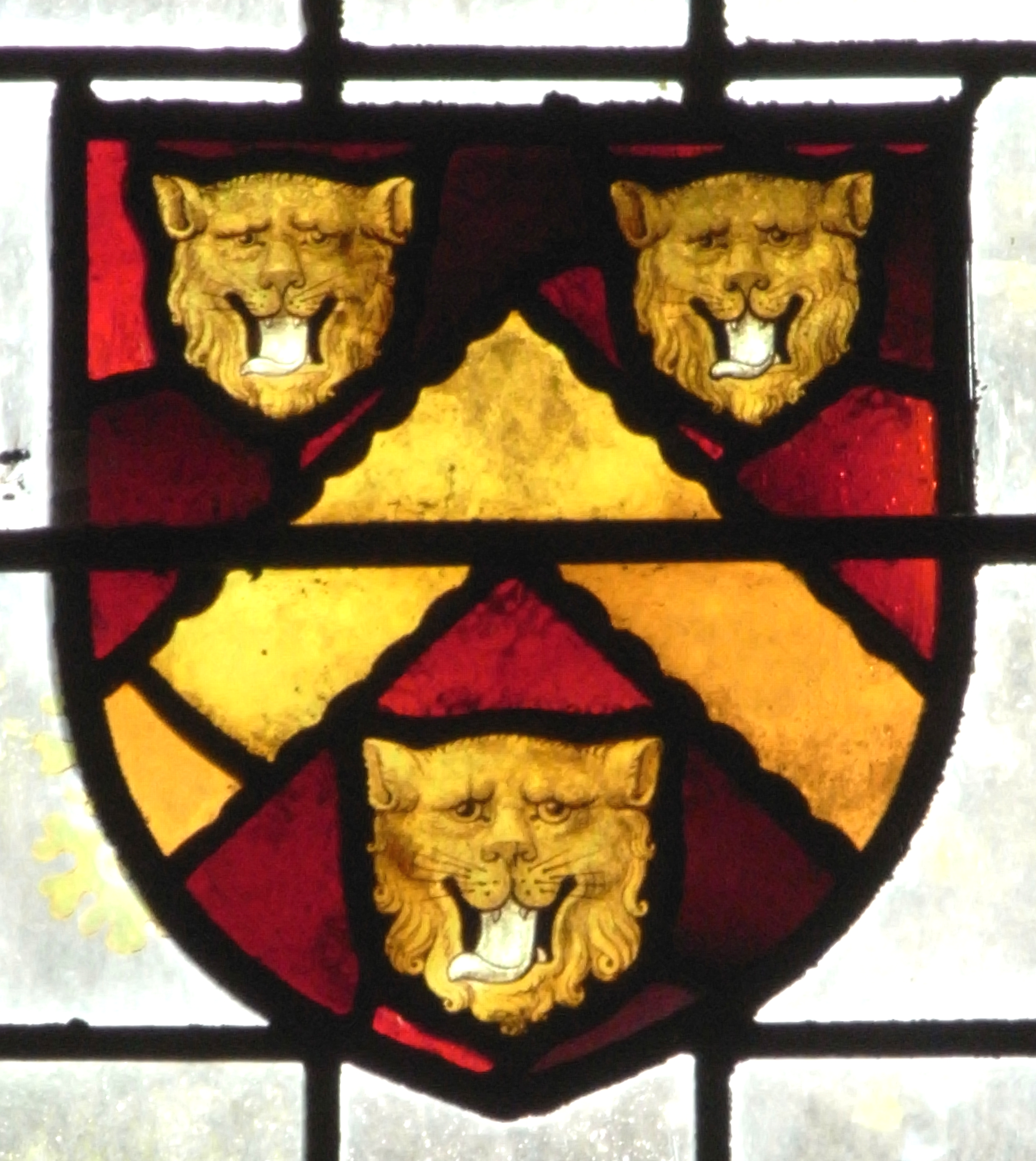
Arms of Peryam: Gules, a chevron engrailed between three lion's faces or. Detail from 19th century heraldic stained-glass window in Holy Cross Church, Crediton, bequeathed by Rev. W. M. Smith-Dorrien, Vicar of Crediton

Fulford House was built by Sir William Peryam (1534–1604) Lord Chief Baron of the Exchequer, who purchased the estate from Robert Mallet of Wolleigh, in the parish of Beaford, Devon. His monument survives in Holy Cross Church, Crediton. He left no male progeny and his estates were inherited by his four daughters and co-heiresses. Little Fulford was the share of his second daughter Elizabeth Peryam (1571–1635), the wife of Sir Robert Basset (1574–1641), MP, of Umberleigh and Heanton Punchardon, Devon.

=== Basset ===
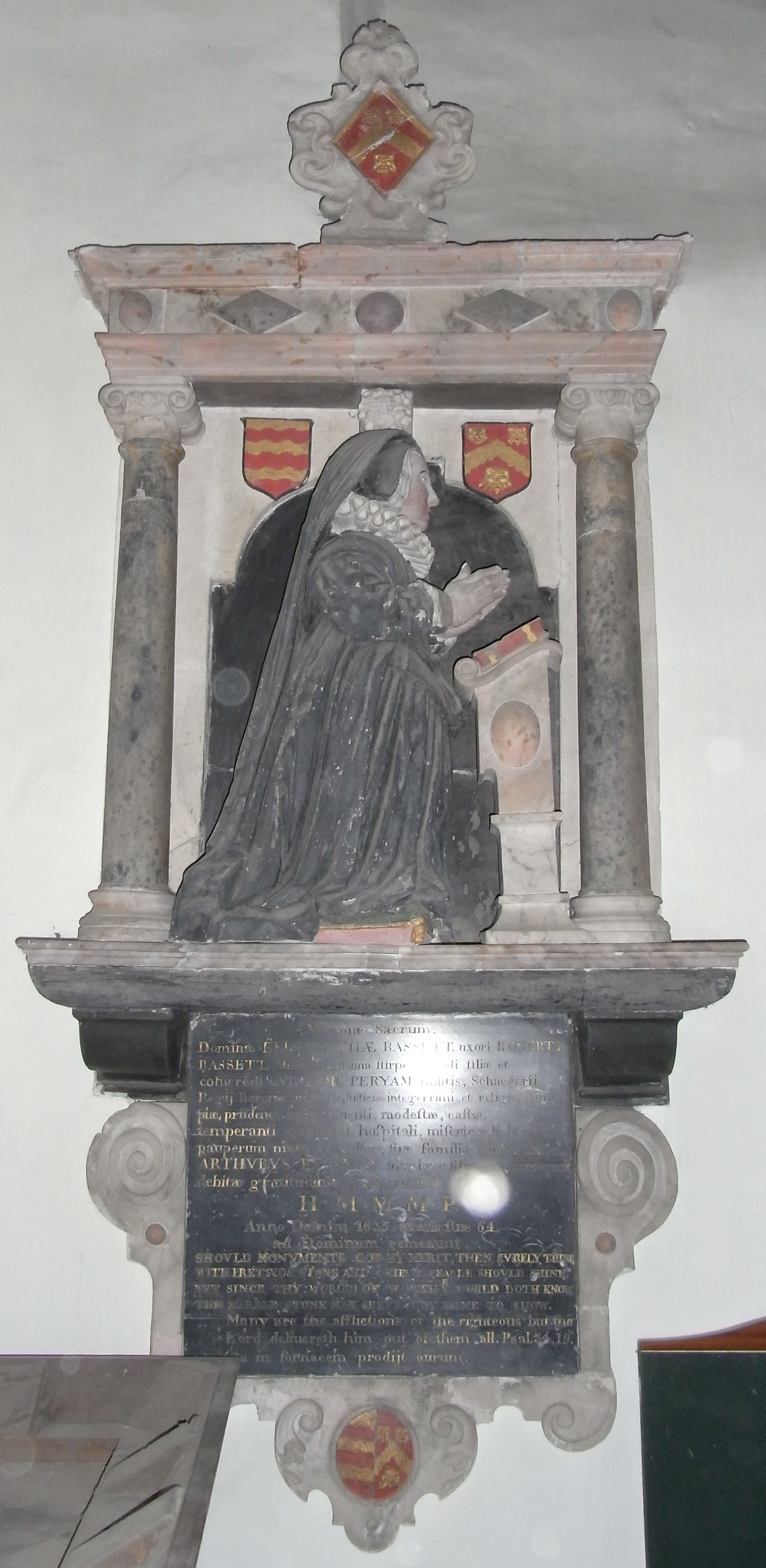
Mural monument to Elizabeth Peryam (1571–1635), wife of Sir Robert Basset. Within a lozenge at the top and on an escutcheon to the sinister are shown her paternal arms of Peryam: Gules, a chevron engrailed or between three lion's faces affrontes of the last. The arms of Peryam are also shown on an oval cartouche underneath, impaled by Basset

A mural monument to Elizabeth Peryam (1571–1635), heiress of Little Fulford, and wife of Sir Robert Bassett (1574–1641) of Heanton Punchardon, North Devon, MP for Plymouth in 1593, is situated on the east wall of the Basset Chapel in Heanton Punchardon Church. She was one of the four daughters and co-heiresses of Sir William Peryam (1534–1604), Lord Chief Baron of the Exchequer, by his second wife Anne Parker, daughter of John Parker of North Molton, Devon, ancestor of the Earls of Morley of Saltram House near Plymouth. She bore her husband two sons and four daughters, amongst whom was Colonel Arthur Basset, MP, who erected the monument. It is inscribed in Latin as follows:

Memoriae Sacrum Dominae Elizabethae Bassett uxori Roberti Bassett militis clarissima stirpe oriundi filiae et cohaeredi Gulielmi Peryam militis Schaccarii Regii Baronis primarii Judicic integerrimi et religiosissimi piae prudenti justae patienti modestae castae temperanti constanti hospitali misericordi beneficae pauperum matri et medicae suae familiae conservatrici. Arthurus Bassett armiger filius eius primogenit(us) debitae gratitudinis et observantiae ergo H(oc) M(onumentum) M(atri)? M(aerens) P(osuit) Anno Domini 1635 aetatis suae 64 ad Dominum remeaunt.
Should monuments goe by merit then surely thine,
With pretious stone and orient pearle should shine,
But since thy world of worth ye world doth know,
This marble stone may serve thy name to show.
"Many are the afflictions of the righteous but the Lord delivereth him out of them all". Psal. 34.19.
Ita in fornacem prodiit aurum

Which may be translated literally into English as:

"Sacred to the memory of Lady Elizabeth Bassett wife of Robert Bassett, knight, arisen from a famous stock, daughter and co-heiress of William Peryam, knight, Lord Chief Justice of the Royal Treasury, (he was) most impartial and duty-bound, (she was) pious, prudent, just, long-suffering, modest, chaste, temperant, constant, hospitable, compassionate, kind, a mother and healer of the poor, a preserver of her own family. Arthur Bassett, Esquire, her sorrowing first-born son, of a duty of gratitude and respect therefore placed this monument to his mother in the year of Our Lord 1635 of her age 64 may she remain to the Lord...Thus does gold come forth into an oven".

=== Tuckfield ===
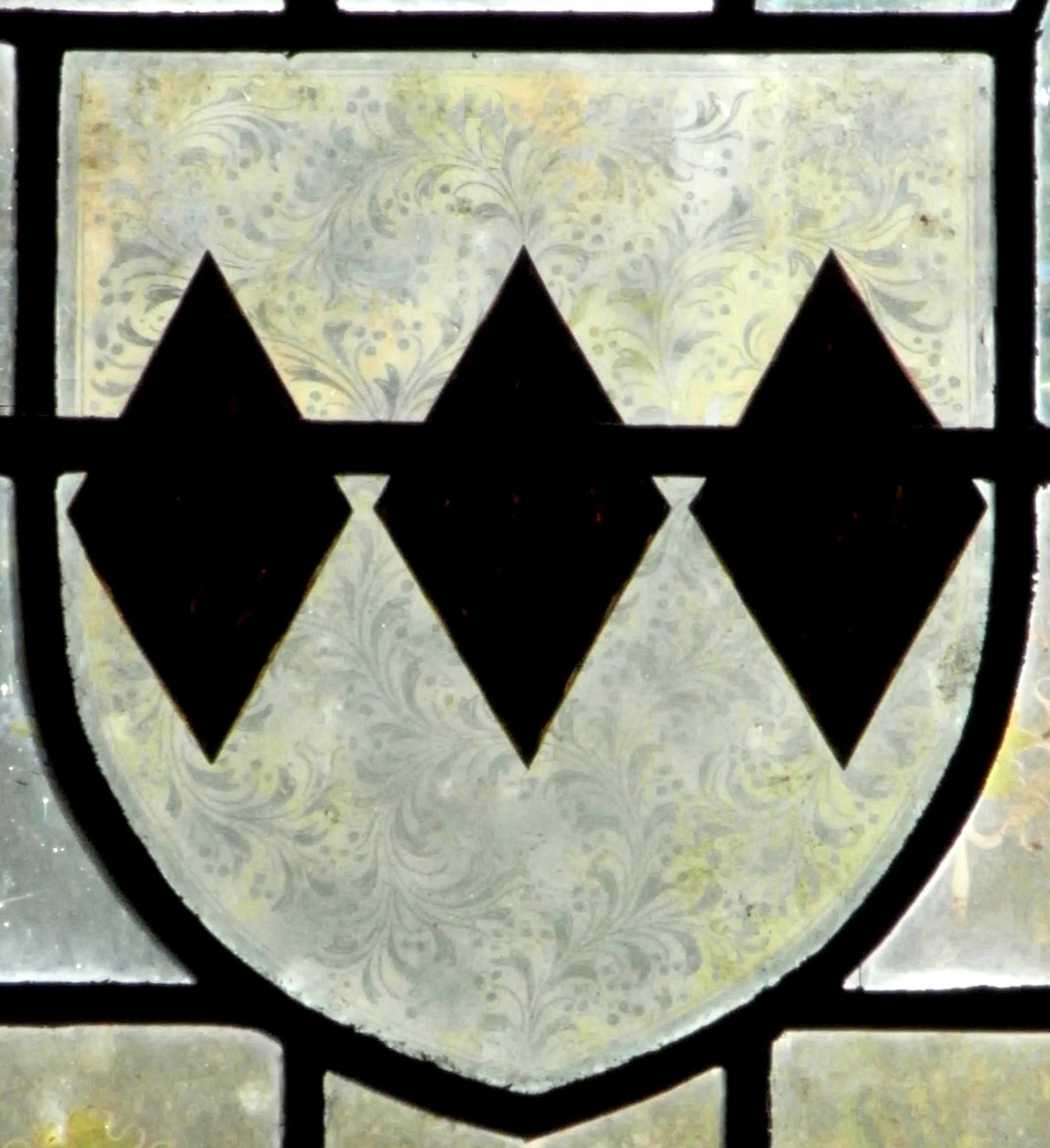
Arms of Tuckfield: Argent, three lozenges in fess sable. Detail from 19th century heraldic stained-glass window in Holy Cross Church, Crediton, bequeathed by Rev. W. M. Smith-Dorrien, Vicar of Crediton

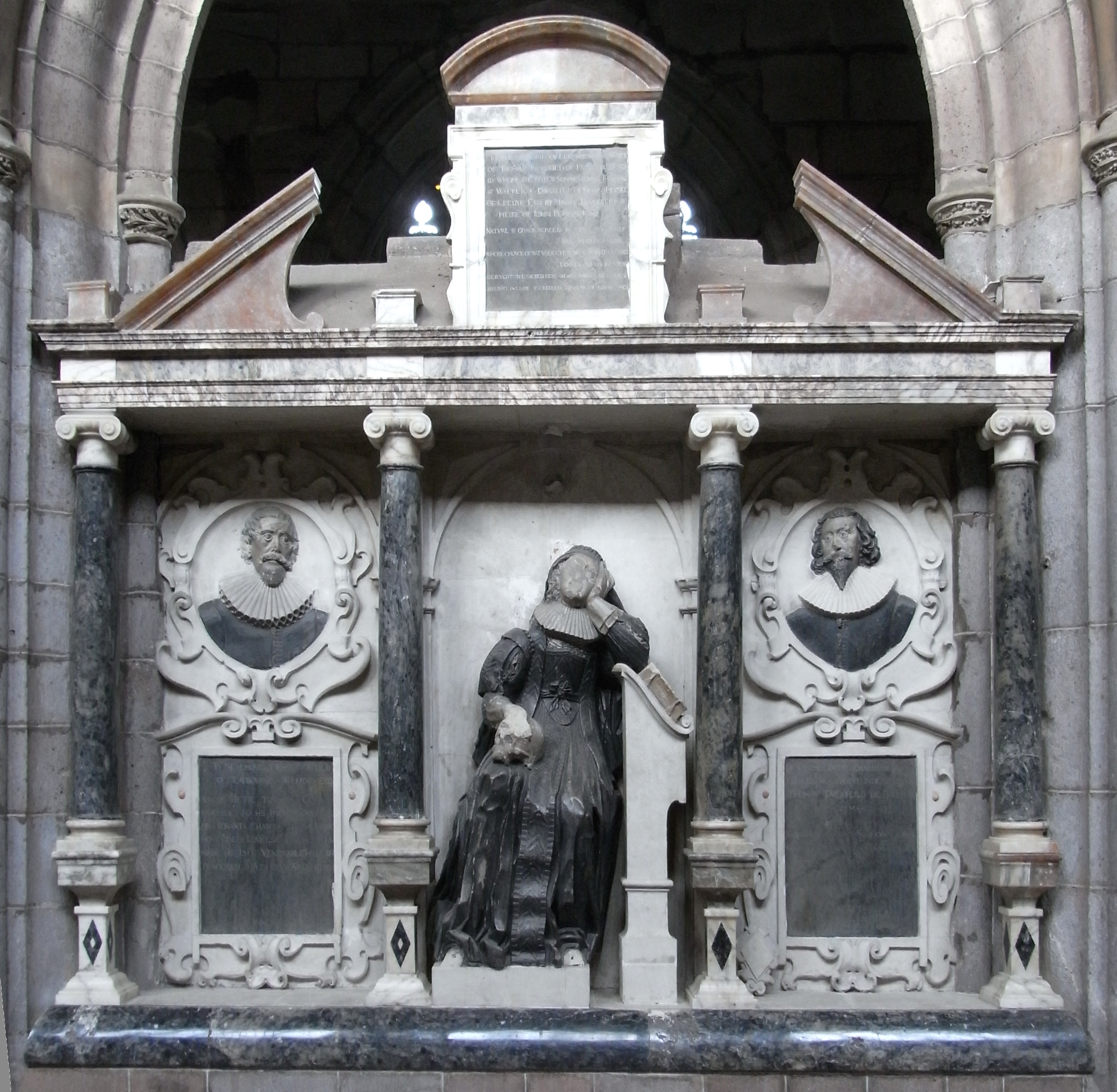
Tuckfield Monument in Crediton Church. Left: John II Tuckfield (1555–1630), who purchased Little Fulford; right: Thomas I Tuckfield (1580/90–1642), his son and heir; and centre: Elizabeth Reynell (1593–1630), Thomas's wife. Like the adjoining monument to Sir William Peryam it is situated in a place of great honour, against the north wall of the chancel, near the high altar

==== John II Tuckfield (1555–1630) ====
John II Tuckfield (1555–1630) of Tedburn St Mary, purchased Little Fulford from Robert Basset and thenceforth made it his seat. He was the son and heir of John I (c. 1530 – c. 1586/89) and Joan Tuckfield of Crediton John I was son and heir of William Tuckfield clothier of Crediton (died c.1565) and his wife Joan daughter of John Kene of Upton Hellions. William was probably a kinsman of John Tuckfield the wealthy woollen-cloth merchant and Mayor of Exeter in 1549–50, the surviving portrait of whose wife Joan Tuckfield (1506–1573) is one of the oldest paintings in the collection of the Royal Albert Memorial Museum in Exeter. In 1797 the Devon topographer Rev. John Swete visited Little Fulford and recorded in his journal that the "large woollen manufactory" of the Tuckfield family "has ever since subsisted in these parts". An elaborate monument survives in Crediton Church, next to Sir William Peryam's, erected by his son Thomas I Tuckfield (c.1585–1642), which shows a sculpted bust of John II Tuckfield on the left, of his son Thomas I on the right and a full figure of the latter's wife Elizabeth Reynell in the centre. John II Tuckfield married twice: having by his first wife Joan Morrish at least four children, and by his second wife Elizabeth Quicke at least seven children. Including:

- Joan Tuckfield (1579–??) who married Daniel Hamlyn (1584–1660) of Exwick and Paschoe, Colebrooke.
- Thomas I Tuckfield (c.1585–1642), eldest son and heir
- Walter Tuckfield (1603–1638), Rector of Morchard Bishop, which advowson had been purchased by his father in 1630, and where his mural monument survives in the chancel at St Mary's.
- Mary Tuckfield (1618–1663), who in 1638 married Dennis Prideaux (c.1618–1641), a younger son of Sir Thomas Prideaux (1575–1641) of Nutwell in the parish of Woodbury, near Lympstone. He was a fellow of Exeter College, Oxford, and Rector of Lympstone, and in 1639 was appointed by his brother-in-law Thomas Tuckfield as rector of Morchard Bishop in succession to his brother Walter Tuckfield (died 1638). Without progeny.
- Roger I Tuckfield (1607–1684), of Tedburn St Mary, who married Mary Hamlyn,(1607–1678) daughter of Thomas Hamlyn (1578–1618 brother of Daniel) and his wife Judith (1586-c.1652) daughter of Richard Mayne of Exeter (died 1603). Judith subsequently married Thomas Haydon (1562–1645) of Combe Lancey, Sandford, through whom the long lease on Combe Lancey descended to Roger and Mary. Roger I subsequently acquired Raddon in the parish of Thorverton, 4 miles north-east of Little Fulford. The couple's monument survives in St Thomas of Canterbury's Church, Thorverton. They had at least ten children, of whom:

His eldest son and heir Roger II Tuckfield (1635–1686/7) of Raddon married Margaret (daughter of William Davie of Dira, Sandford, second son of Sir John Davie of Creedy 1st Bart.) by whom he had three children:

  - John Tuckfield (1681–1681).
  - Roger III Tuckfield (1683/4–1739) of Raddon, MP for Ashburton, who died unmarried and without progeny.
  - Margaret Tuckfield, (c.1685–1754) who married twice, firstly to the wealthy Samuel Rolle (1646–1719), MP, of Heanton Satchville, Petrockstowe, by whom she had a daughter, the sole heiress to her father, Margaret Rolle, 15th Baroness Clinton (1709–1781). Secondly she married John Harris (1690–1767).

His second son John Tuckfield (1637–1705) of Exeter, Combe Lancey, and Cowick. His third son Thomas Tuckfield (1647–1710) of London, and Combe Lancey, Master of the Grocer's Company, London, close friend of William Lygon of Madresfield. Thomas Tuckfield married Mary Coles in 1673 at St George's, Southwark, by whom he had four children, of whom son and heir Roger Tuckfield (1676–1740) of Red Lyon Square, Holborn, London, (see later).

==== Thomas I Tuckfield (c.1585–1642) ====
Thomas Tuckfield (c.1585–1642), eldest son and heir of John Tuckfield (1555–1630). His bust is on the right side of the Tuckfield Monument he erected in memory of his wife in Crediton Church. He married Elizabeth Reynell (1593–1630), 2nd daughter of Richard Reynell (died 1631) of Creedy Widger, a Bencher of the Middle Temple, by his wife Mary Peryam (died 1662), a daughter and co-heiress of John Peryam, son of Sir John Peryam, brother of Sir William Peryam of Little Fulford.

==== Thomas II Tuckfield (died 1649) ====
Thomas II Tuckfield (died 1649), eldest son and heir, died without progeny.

==== John III Tuckfield (1625–1675) ====
John III Tuckfield (1625–1675), younger brother and heir. In 1667 he married Mary Pincombe, a daughter of John Pincombe (d.pre-1657), a barrister of the Middle Temple, of South Molton, Devon, by whom he had 5 children, 3 of whom died as infants. The ledger-stone with details to Mary, John, and their sons John and Pyncombe, at the east end, north aisle, of Holy Cross, Crediton. The surviving two daughters and co-heiresses were:

- Mary Tuckfield (1660–1728), who married twice: firstly in 1690 at Shobrooke to Col. Francis Fulford (1666–1700) of Great Fulford, Dunsford. They had one son John Fulford (1692–1693) who died an infant and whose monument survives in Dunsford Church. Mary married secondly in 1705 to Henry Trenchard (1668–1720).
- Elizabeth Tuckfield (1663–1695), unmarried.

==== Walter Tuckfield (1676) ====
Walter Tuckfield (1676), youngest brother and heir. He died without progeny when the co-heirs to Little Fulford became his two teenaged nieces, the 15-year-old Elizabeth Tuckfield (died 1695) and the 13-year-old Mary Tuckfield (died 1728) (later Mrs Fulford and the Mrs Trenchard). Walter Tuckfield's ledger-stone with details is at the east end of the north aisle, Holy Cross, Crediton.

==== Col. Francis Fulford (1666–1700) ====
Col. Francis Fulford (1666–1700) of Great Fulford, whose 2nd wife was the heiress Mary Tuckfield (died 1728). He was twice MP for Callington in Cornwall, in 1690–5 and 1698–1700, presumably upon the interest of the influential Rolle family of Heanton Satchville, Petrockstowe, cousins of his 2nd wife. It was at this time "When the two Fulfords were the possession of one lord" that the epithets "Great" and "Little" were assigned to each property. According to Swete, Col. Fulford "May reasonably be supposed to have a predilection for his own inherited mansion to which for the sake of distinction and pre-eminence he would annex the adjunct of "Great". Nor will it be consider'd as an appropriation ill-placed, if the reference be made to its superior magnificence and antiquity, in which latter boast it exceeded the other by three centuries". The marriage was without progeny. His monument survives in Dunsford Church, carrying the Fulford arms impaling those of Paulet/Powlet (his first wife, and Tuckfield.

==== Roger III Tuckfield (c.1683/4–1739) of Raddon ====
Roger III Tuckfield (c.1683/4–1739) of Raddon, Thorverton, MP for Ashburton was the heir of his cousin Mary Tuckfield (died 1728), but only in a life interest in the estates, as Mary had created an entail by her will, having correctly foreseen that Roger would not leave progeny. He was the grandson of Roger I Tuckfield (1607–1684) of Thorverton, 2nd son of Roger Tuckfield and Margaret Davie (see above). He died unmarried and without progeny.

==== John IV Tuckfield (1718–1767) ====
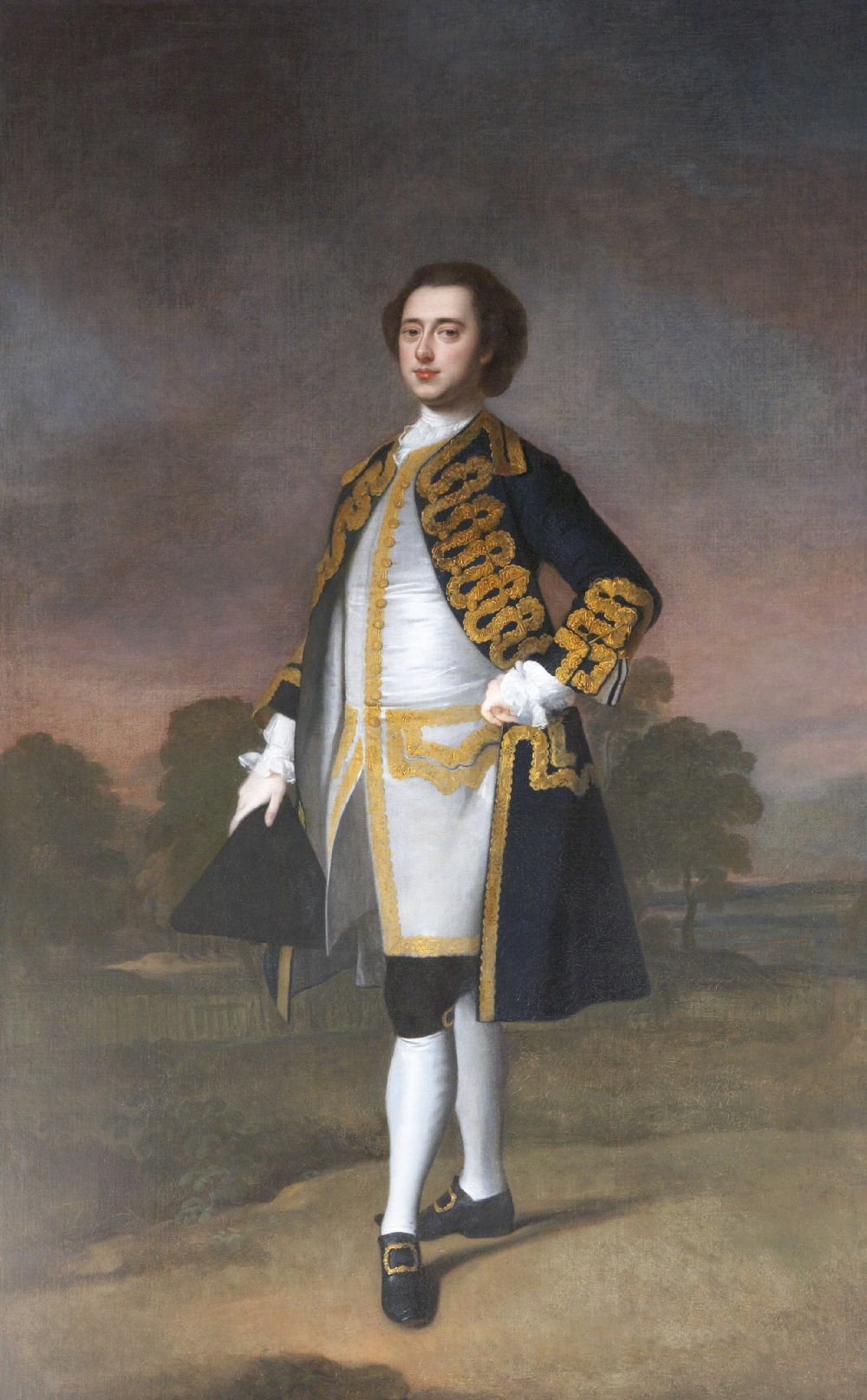
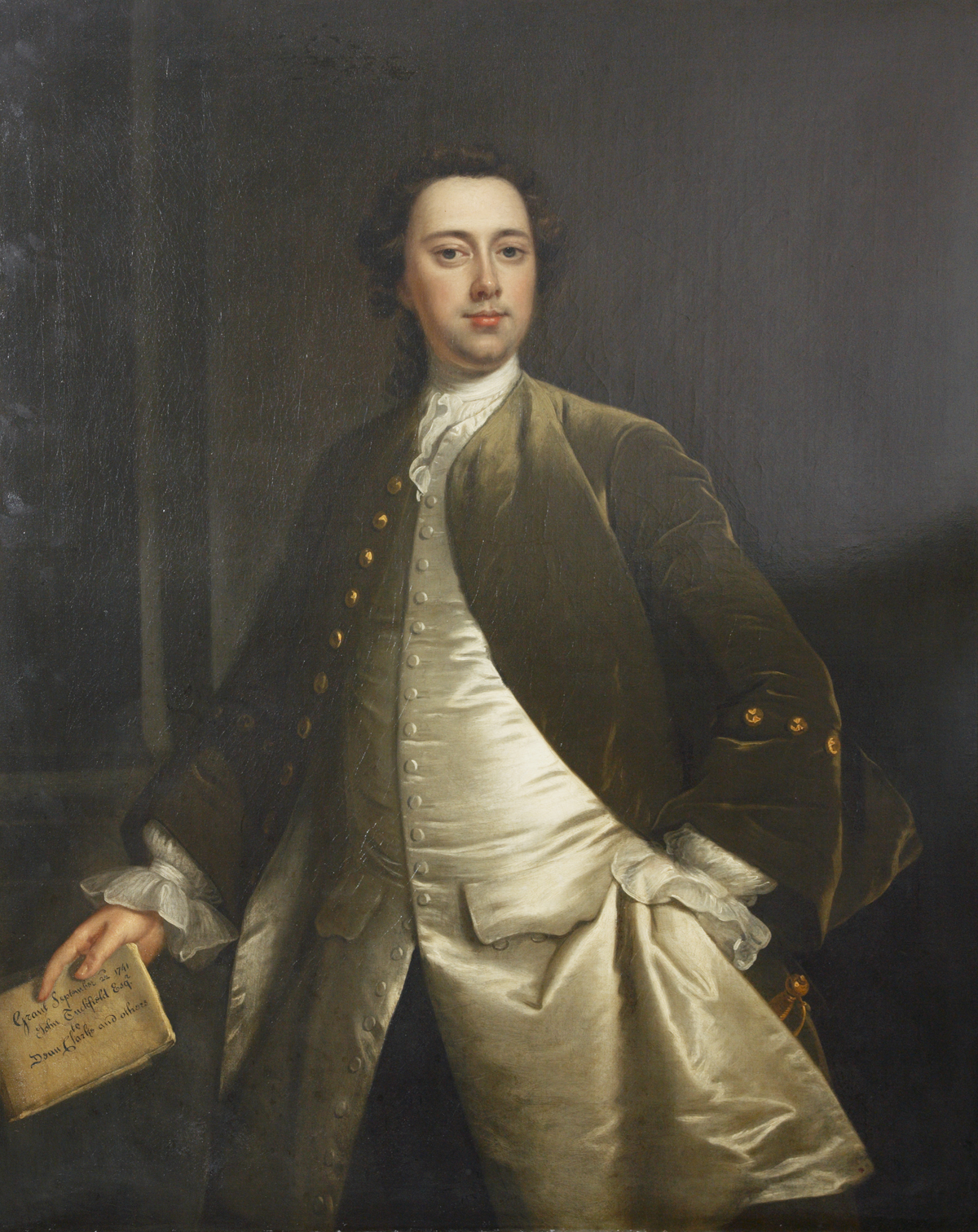
Two portraits of John IV Tuckfield (1718–1767) by Thomas Hudson (1701–1779), left: in the collection of Exeter Guildhall, a very large painting (9ft by 5ft); right: in the collection of the Royal Devon and Exeter Hospital, Exeter, commissioned by the trustees

John IV Tuckfield (1718–1767), MP for Exeter (1747–1767), was the heir of his distant cousin Roger Tuckfield (1683/4–1739). Mrs Trenchard (Mary Tuckfield (died 1728)) had foreseen that Roger Tuckfield (died 1739) would not produce progeny and had therefore entailed the property after his death onto another relative, John Tuckfield (1718–1767), the eldest son of Roger Tuckfield (1676–1740) of London, and his second wife Elizabeth daughter of Henry Northleigh of Peamore. Roger Tuckfield, of Red Lyon Square, Holborn, London, educated at Merchant Taylors' School, was the son and heir of Thomas Tuckfield, Master of the Grocer's Company, London (see earlier) and his wife Mary Coles. Roger's first wife was Elizabeth daughter of Richard Dowdeswell, MP for Tewkesbury and High Sheriff of Worcestershire. John's mother was Elizabeth Northleigh, daughter of Henry Northleigh (1643–1694) of Peamore, Exminster, of an old Devon family which originated at Northleigh in the parish of Inwardleigh, near Okehampton, thrice MP for Okehampton, by his wife Susanna Sparke, daughter of John Sparke, dyer, of Exeter. Susanna Sparke was the granddaughter of Stephen Toller, haberdasher of Exeter, who in 1673 purchased "Crediton Parks" (to the immediate north of Crediton, the former deer-park of the Bishops of Exeter) from Sir John Chichester of Hall, Bishop's Tawton. Susanna devised Crediton Parks to her daughter Susanna Northleigh, who devised it to her nephew John Tuckfield (c.1719–1767) of Little Fulford, eldest son of her sister Elizabeth Northleigh by her husband Roger Tuckfield of London, Esq.

John IV Tuckfield married Frances Gould, daughter and co-heiress of William Gould of nearby Downes House, near Crediton. He donated the site of a former tilting-ground in Southernhay, Exeter, for the building of the Royal Devon and Exeter Hospital in Southernhay, Exeter and was joint founder and chairman of the court of governors of the hospital which opened in January 1743. Four years later in 1747 he was elected MP for Exeter. Two portraits of John IV Tuckfield (c.1719–1767) survive, both by Thomas Hudson (1701–1779), a very large one (9 ft by 5 ft) in the collection of Exeter Guildhall, and another in the collection of the Royal Devon and Exeter Hospital, Exeter, commissioned by the trustees. He died without progeny and he bequeathed Little Fulford, with entail, to his next younger brother Henry Tuckfield (died 1797), who died unmarried.

==== Henry Tuckfield (1723–1797) ====
Henry Tuckfield (1723–1797) (younger brother), died unmarried, when under the entail it then passed to his sister Elizabeth Tuckfield (1716–1807).

==== Elizabeth Tuckfield (1716–1807) ====
Elizabeth Tuckfield (1716–1807) sister, who inherited under the entail. She also died unmarried, when under the entail it passed to a distant cousin, via the Northleigh family, Richard Hippisley (1774–1844), eldest son of Rev. John Hippisley Coxe (1735–1822) of Stowe-in-the-Wold Gloucestershire and of Lambourne Place, Berkshire.

=== Hippisley-Tuckfield ===
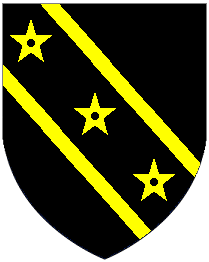
Arms of Hippisley of Ston Easton, Somerset: Sable, three mullets pierced in bend between two bendlets or

==== Richard Hippisley (1774–1844) ====
Under Henry Tuckfield's will Little Fulford was inherited by Richard Hippisley (1774–1844), a distant cousin, who shared common descent from Henry Northleigh of Peamore, Devon, by his wife Susanna Toller. In accordance with the terms of the bequest he assumed by Royal Licence the name of Tuckfield, his family being known thenceforth as Hippisley-Tuckfield, and abandoned the arms of Hippisley (Sable, three mullets pierced in bend between two bendlets or) for the arms of Tuckfield. He was the eldest son of Rev. John Hippisley (1735–1822) of Stow-in-the-Wold, Gloucestershire by his wife Margaret Cox, eldest daughter of John Hippisley Cox (1715–1769) (builder of the Palladian mansion Ston Easton Park in Somerset) by his wife Mary Northleigh, daughter and heiress of Stephen Northleigh of Peamore, Exminster, son of Henry Northleigh by his wife Susanna Toller, heiress of "Crediton Parks", the former park of the Bishop of Crediton.

Richard Hippisley-Tuckfield was Sheriff of Devon in 1813. He demolished Little Fulford House in 1815, and erected a new house on a nearby site, called by the same name, later in 1850 remodelled in an Italianate-style.

===== Marriage to Charlotte Mordaunt =====
In 1800 he married Charlotte Mordaunt (1777–1848), daughter of Sir John Mordaunt, 7th Baronet of Massingham. She had "ardent zeal for the training of the deaf and dumb and of school masters for the poor" (as commented the Educational pioneer Sir Thomas Dyke Acland, 11th Baronet (1809–1898), both of whose wives were Charlotte's nieces) and in about 1836 she built a small school for the purpose at Posbury, a manor long owned by the Tuckfields 4 miles south-west of Little Fulford, in the lane opposite Posbury Chapel, built shortly before by her husband to cater for the rapidly expanding congregation of Crediton Church. Charlotte had developed an interest in teaching the deaf and dumb after a visit to her friend Grace Fursdon at Fursdon House, where she met her deaf and dumb protege, who aroused her sympathy and interest. She travelled to Paris to study the teaching methods at the Institut National de Jeunes Sourds de Paris, the institution for the deaf and dumb run by the Venerable Abbe Sicard (died 1822). On her return home she sought out two similarly affected children and taught them herself. She was successful in her methods and was instrumental in establishing a school in Alphington Road, in Exeter, the precursor of the present Royal West of England School for the Deaf. She wrote a series of articles later published in a book entitled "Education for the People".

==== John Henry Hippisley-Tuckfield (1801–1880) ====
Richard was succeeded by his eldest son John Henry Hippisley-Tuckfield (1801–1880), Sheriff of Devon in 1859 and Deputy Lieutenant of Somerset, who changed the name of the house to Shobrooke Park, after a coffin bound for Great Fulford was delivered in error to himself at Little Fulford, and in the hope of avoiding similar confusions in the future. He encased the house on Portland stone, added a parapet of balustrades and landscaped the park. He died without progeny and was succeeded by his cousin, Sir John Shelley, 9th Baronet (1848–1931)

=== Shelley ===
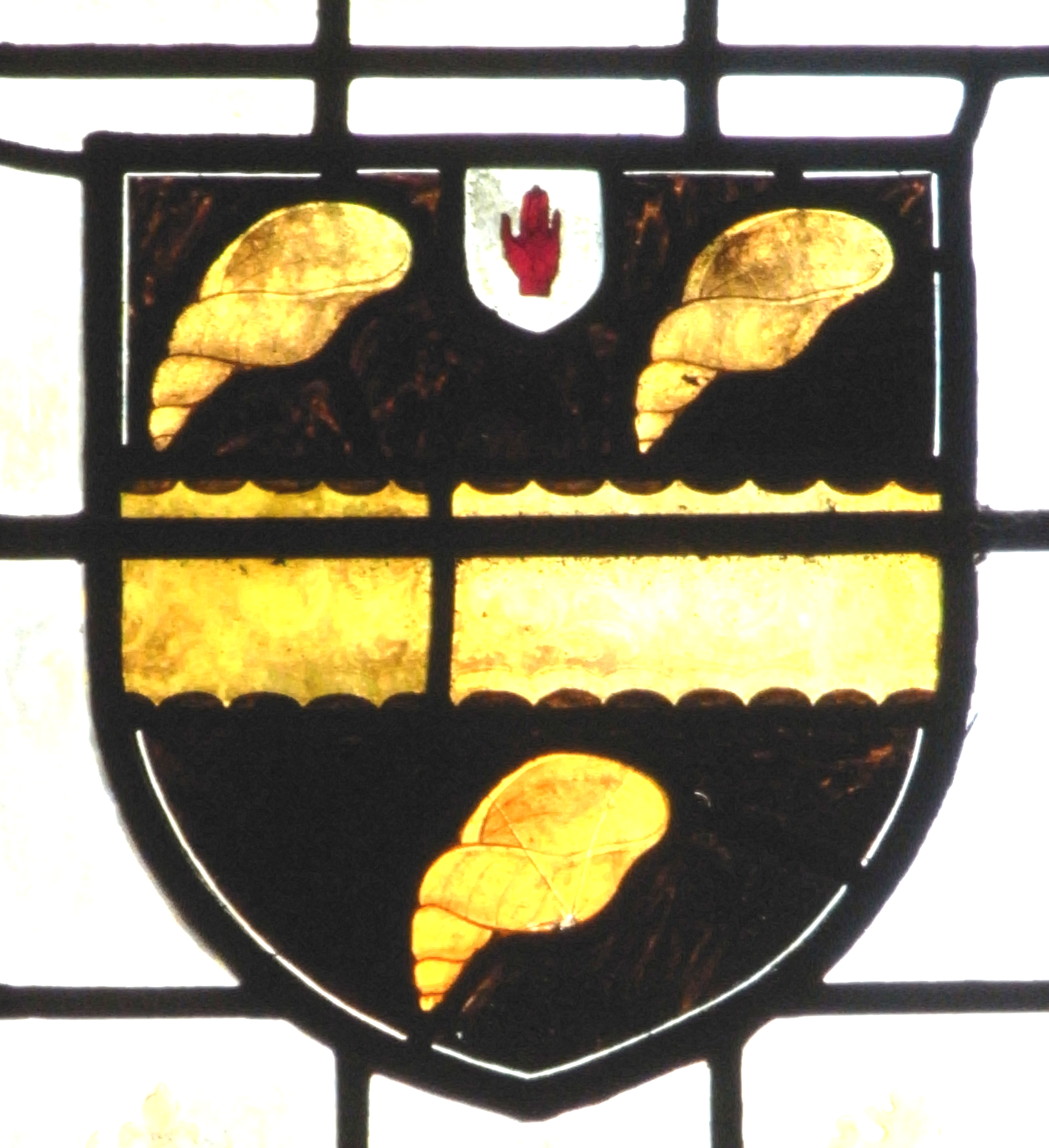
Canting arms of Shelley of Michelgrove: Sable, a fesse engrailed between three whelk shells or. Detail from heraldic window c. 1924 in Crediton Church, Devon, south wall of south transept, bequeathed by Rev. W. M. Smith-Dorrien, Vicar of Crediton

==== Sir John Shelley, 9th Baronet (1848–1931) ====
Sir John Shelley, 9th Baronet (1848–1931) was the cousin and heir of John Henry Hippisley-Tuckfield (died 1880), being the grandson of his uncle Henry Hippisley (1776–1838). He was born at Bere Ferrers, Devon, the son and heir of Rev. Sir Frederic Shelley, 8th Baronet (1809–1869), rector of Bere Ferrers, by his wife Charlotte Martha Hippisley (1812–1893), a daughter of Rev. Henry Hippisley (1776–1838) of Lambourne Place, Berkshire and niece of Richard Hippisley-Tuckfield. He was High Sheriff of Devon in 1895. Rev. Frederic Shelley had been appointed by Richard Hippisley as curate of St Luke's Chapel, Posbury, built by him in 1836. Following his marriage in 1845 to Charlotte Martha Hippisley, he was appointed rector of Bere Ferrers.

==== Sir John Frederick Shelley, 10th Baronet (1884–1976) ====
Sir John Frederick Shelley, 10th Baronet (1884–1976) (son and heir). High Sheriff of Devon in 1938. Shobrooke Park was used during the Second World War by St Peter's Court, a preparatory school evacuated from Broadstairs, Kent, and at 4 a.m. on 23 January 1945 whilst full of 70 schoolboys and staff the house was destroyed by fire, causing the death of two pupils. All the contents were lost, including all the Shelley family portraits and furniture. The gutted shell of the house was later demolished in the interests of safety. Two sets of gatepiers and the stone balustrades of the extensive terrace survive. In 2014 the Shelley Baronets still live in a house on the site. The formal gardens have been restored by the Shelley family and are opened to the public by appointment only. A large part of the landscaped park, also known as Shobrooke Park, with a large lake is now open to the general public and also contains a cricket pitch.

==== Sir John Richard Shelley, 11th Baronet (born 1943) ====
The owner of Shobrooke Park in 2014 is Sir John Richard Shelley, 11th Baronet (born 1943), (grandson, son of John Shelley (born 1915), son of the 10th Baronet who predeceased his father). He does not use the title. He is a retired Medical Doctor, a partner since 1974 in Shelley, Doddington and Gibb, Medical Practitioners, of South Molton, Devon. In 2014 he remains patron of St Luke's Chapel, Posbury, 4 miles south-west of Shobrooke, built in 1835 by his ancestor Richard Hippisley Tuckfield (died 1844). In 1965 he married Clare Bicknell, daughter of Claud Bicknell, OBE, of Newcastle upon Tyne, by whom he has two daughters, Diana and Helen. The heir to the baronetcy is his brother Thomas Shelley (born 1945) of Woodbridge in Suffolk.

== Sources ==
- Burke's Genealogical and Heraldic History of the Landed Gentry, 15th Edition, ed. Pirie-Gordon, H., London, 1937, pp. 1119–20, pedigree of Hippisley of Ston Easton
- The Manor of Combe Lancey - Sandford, Crediton Devon, M Maddock, on CD at the Devon Heritage Centre (DRO).
