= Alexander Münster =

German aristocrat

Alexander Münster Prince of Münster Count of Münster-Ledenburg
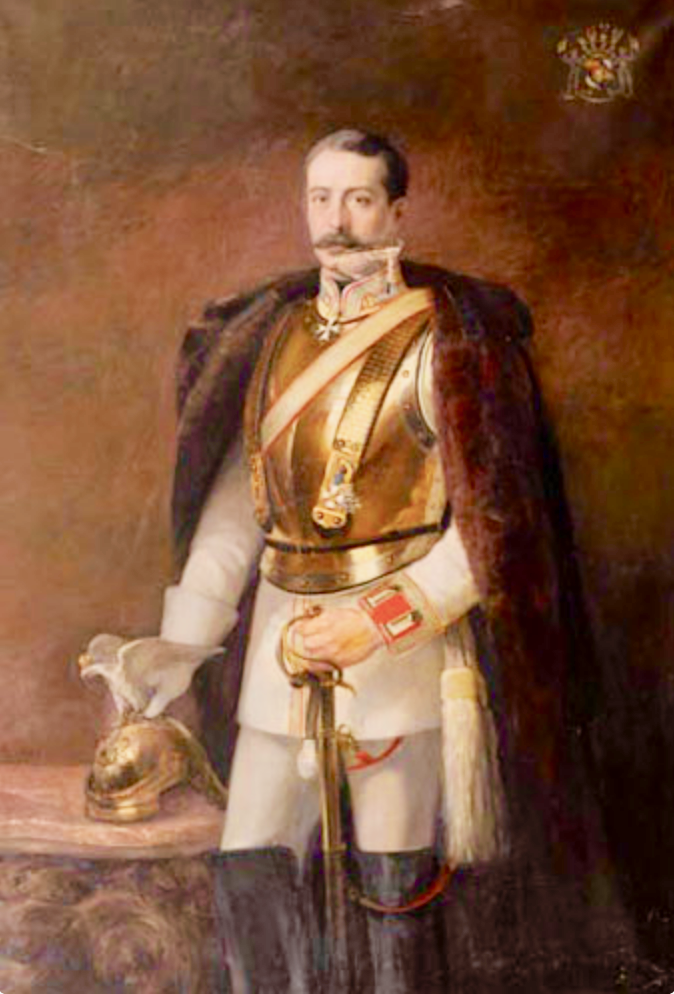
- Portrait of Münster, 1901
- Born: Alexander Otto Hugo Wladimir zu Münster; 1 September 1858; Derneburg, Kingdom of Hanover
- Died: 12 October 1922 (aged 64)
- Spouse: Lady Muriel Hay (m. 1890; died 1922)
- Children: Friedrich zu Münster; Paul zu Münster
- Parent(s): Georg Herbert Münster; Aleksandra Mikhailovna Golitsyna

Alexander Otto Hugo Wladimir Count zu Münster (1 September 1858 – 12 October 1922), Prince zu Münster in 1905, at the death of his elder brother, was a German aristocrat. He was the owner of Maresfield Park estate, Maresfield, East Sussex.

== Early life ==
Prince Alexander Münster was born in Derneburg, Kingdom of Hanover, on 1 September 1858, the son of Georg Herbert, Prince zu Münster (1820–1902), German ambassador in London 1873-1885 and subsequently Paris. His mother was his father's first wife, Princess Aleksandra Mikhailovna Golitsyna.

== Life in England ==
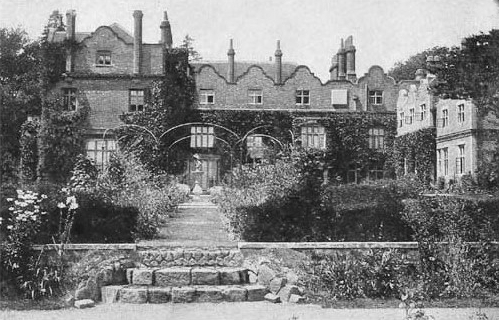
Maresfield Park at the time of Count Munster

In 1899, Münster inherited Maresfield Park estate from his friend Hervey Charles Pechell. Münster was living in Maresfield Park while Pechell and his wife, Blanche Henrietta Johnes Shelley, resided in Bellagio in Italy. He officiated at the planting of the oak on Maresfield Recreation Ground commemorating Queen Victoria's Jubilee in 1897 which was performed by her eldest daughter the German Empress, wife of the German Emperor Frederick III. The Pechells had donated the ground to the parish in 1897 but Münster legally transferred it in 1899. In 1915, during World War I, it was seized from him by the British government under the Trading With the Enemy laws as he was a German citizen. Records relating to Maresfield Park are held by the East Sussex Record Office.

== Personal life ==
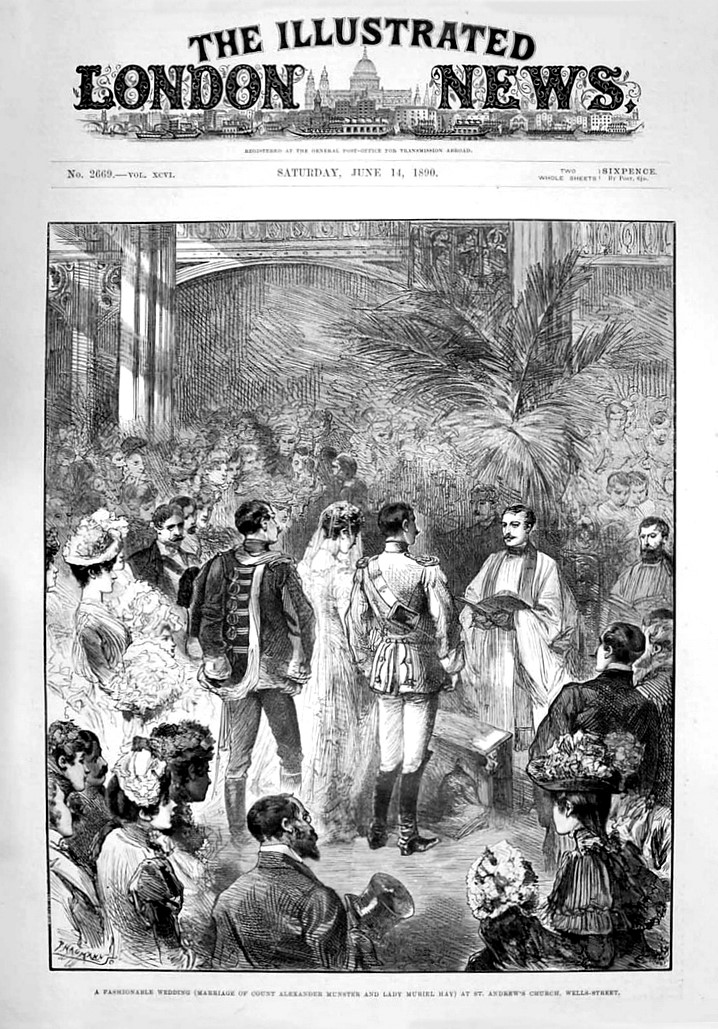
Marriage of Count Alexander Munster and Lady Muriel Hay, St Andrews, Wells Street, Illustrated London News, 1890.

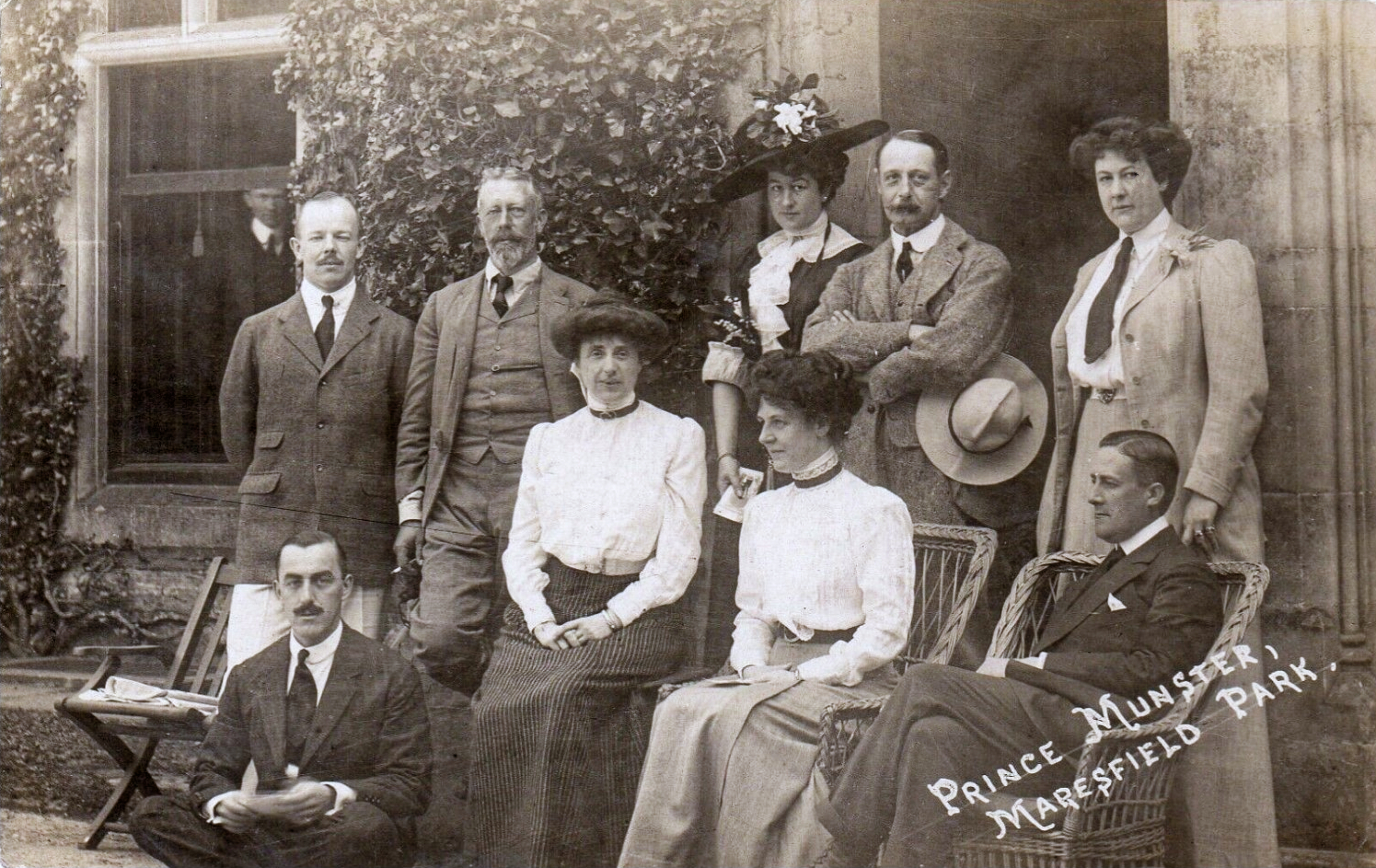
Count Munster at Maresfield Park, standing second from right

On 3 June 1890, he married Lady Muriel Henrietta Constance Hay (1863–1927) at St Andrews Church, Wells Street, London. As the daughter of George Hay-Drummond, 12th Earl of Kinnoull, the event was depicted on the front page of The Illustrated London News. Together, the couple had sons:

- Friedrich zu Münster (1891–1942), who married Sylvia, Countess Fugger von Babenhausen, daughter of Karl, 5th Prince Fugger von Babenhausen, and Princess Eleonora of Hohenlohe-Bartenstein, in 1925. They divorced in 1928.
- Paul zu Münster (1898–1968), who married Vera Maud Helene Katharina von Weinberg, daughter of Carl von Weinberg and Ethel Mary Villers Forbes, in 1921. They divorced and he married Margaret Helene Edith Ward, daughter of Capt. Hon. Cyril Augustus Ward (son of the 1st Earl of Dudley) and Baroness Irene van Brienen, in 1929. Paul and Margaret zu Münster have at least one son: Peter Cyril zu Münster (born 1931), who married Veronica Naylor-Leyland (1932–2019) in 1955.

Münster died on 12 October 1922. Maresfield Park estate, now owned by the British Government, was sold in 1924 to brewer and industrialist William Henry Abbey.

=== Descendants ===
Through his second son, he was a grandfather of Peter Cyril Alexander, Count of Münster (1931–2011), who married Veronica Rosemary Naylor-Leyland (a daughter of Sir Albert Naylor-Leyland, 2nd Baronet), and Ivan, Count of Münster (1937–1952).
