= Maresfield =

Village and parish in East Sussex, England

Coordinates: 51.00°N 0.09°E

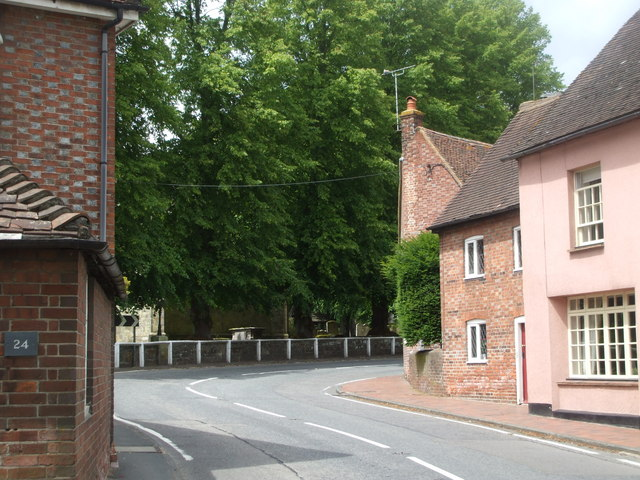

- Location within East Sussex
- Area: 26.3 km^{2} (10.2 sq mi)
- Population: 3,656 (Parish-2011)
  - Density: 320/sq mi (120/km^{2})
- OS grid reference: TQ466240
  - London: 36 miles (58 km) NNW
- Civil parish: Maresfield
- District: Wealden
- Shire county: East Sussex
- Region: South East
- Country: England
- Sovereign state: United Kingdom
- Post town: UCKFIELD
- Postcode district: TN22
- Dialling code: 01825
- Police: Sussex
- Fire: East Sussex
- Ambulance: South East Coast
- UK Parliament: Wealden
- Website: http://www.maresfieldparish.org.uk/

Maresfield is a village and civil parish in the Wealden District of East Sussex, England. The village itself lies 1.5 miles (2.4 km) north from Uckfield; the nearby villages of Nutley and Fairwarp; and the smaller settlements of Duddleswell and Horney Common; and parts of Ashdown Forest all lie within Maresfield parish.

== History ==
The origin of name of the village is uncertain, but the first element may derive from the Old English word mere meaning 'pool'; the second element is certainly feld meaning 'open land' (A. Mawer, The place-names of Sussex volume 2, page 349). Iron has also played an important role in the history of the area, during the time when the Wealden iron industry was flourishing. Within 2 miles (3 km) of Maresfield Church in the 16th century were five iron furnaces: Oldlands, Hendall, Old Forge, Lower Marshalls and Maresfield (powder mills). The Levett family owned and worked Oldlands, and it probably controlled Hendall as well, before it passed into the hands of Ralf Hogge, who formerly worked for the Levett family.

Among families long resident in the Maresfield area with historic ties to the old iron industry were the families of Levett, Pope and Chaloner, who had intermarried. William Levett of Buxted, a vicar who was a prime mover behind the iron industry in the Weald, had ties to the Maresfield area during his tenure as an ironmaster and supplier of armaments to Henry VIII. Eventually the vicar's former servant Ralph Hogge, who had become a major ironmaster after Levett's death, operated four furnaces and one or more forges within a couple of miles of Maresfield Church.

The village has expanded in the past twenty years, and three substantial housing developments have helped to increase the village population.

There was a Roman settlement, including a bloomery, and later a Norman village grew up around the church. In the 15th and 16th centuries

Until 1914 the village was effectively in the ownership and control of the family in Maresfield Park House, initially the Shelley family and then Count Alexander Münster of Hanover, Germany. The estate was requisitioned by the government in 1914 after the start of the First World War. Maresfield Camp was developed on the southwestern part of the estate. The main house and estate houses at the northern end of the estate were sold off in 1924. The southeastern part of the estate was developed as married quarters for soldiers.

== Development ==
There has been considerable recent development. Since approx 1990, substantial developments at the Cabin Café (now Mulberry Park), Park Farm (now The Paddock, Field End and Maple Close) and at Forest Park have increased the population of the village by about 1/3rd. New development of 80 dwellings is planned for Park Farm, which will further enlarge the village by about 1/6th.

== Governance ==
There are 14 members on the Maresfield Parish Council, which has its offices in Nutley.

== Geography ==
Maresfield is on the southern edge of Ashdown Forest which was a deer hunting reserve from the time of King Edward II of England.

The Site of Special Scientific Interest Rock Wood falls within the parish. This woodland is of biological interest, with uncommon mosses and ferns growing alongside the stream which flows through the site.

=== Nutley ===
Nutley is a village on the main road (A22) north of Maresfield. It has its own church, dedicated to St James the Less, although the benefice is combined with Maresfield.

=== Fairwarp ===
Fairwarp is a small village directly north of Maresfield. The church is Christ Church.

== Transport ==
The parish lies at the junction of two main roads: the A22 Eastbourne road; and the A272 cross-country road, the main road being on a bypass to the west of the village.

There are two local bus services 31, 256 that provide a local connection to surrounding areas.

== Sport and leisure ==
Maresfield has a local tennis club, cricket club, football club and a gymnastics club all located in less than one mile radius of the Chequers Inn. As of 2024, the bowls club has closed, and the cricket club only has two friendly matches arranged. Maresfield is also home to Underhill Fishing Lake, managed by the Crowborough and District Anglers Association.

== Education ==
Maresfield has its own primary school in Bonners CE Primary School, although some children travel to Manor Primary School in Uckfield. Secondary school children travel into Uckfield College or Chailey School.

== Conservation ==
The Constitution of Maresfield Conservation Group, which is a Registered Charity, has as its aims the promotion of the conservation, protection and improvement of the physical and natural environment in Maresfield and the surrounding area. Presently the Group is involved in a very wide range of projects.

== Amenities ==
At the centre of the village is the Grade II* listed 17th century Chequers Inn and Maresfield church founded in approx 1100.

There is also the Maresfield recreation ground, which is home to the 'Maresfield Cricket Club', which was established in 1756.

The recreation ground was donated to Maresfield Parish Council by Hervey Charles Pechell in 1897 in commemoration of Queen Victoria's Golden Jubilee, and a commemorative oak was planted by the Empress Frederick, Victoria's eldest daughter.

The recreation ground was not legally transferred until 1899 when Alexander Münster had inherited all of the Maresfield Estate from his friend Pechell, though the plaque on the lamp at the entrance to the ground records the gift from the Pechells.

== Freedom of the Parish ==
The following people and military units have received the Freedom of the Parish of Maresfield.

=== Military Units ===
- 5 (Maresfield) Squadron 11 (Royal School of Signals) Signal Regiment: 27 June 2021.

== Notable people ==
- John Joseph Bennett (1801–1876), physician and botanist, died in Maresfield

== Gallery ==
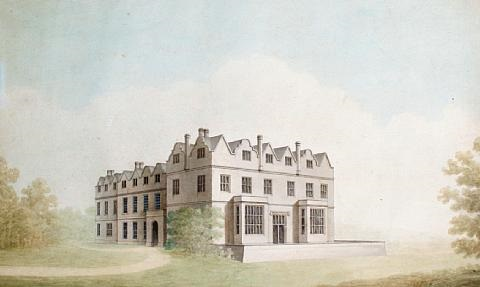
Maresfield Park, watercolour by Benjamin Dean Wyatt

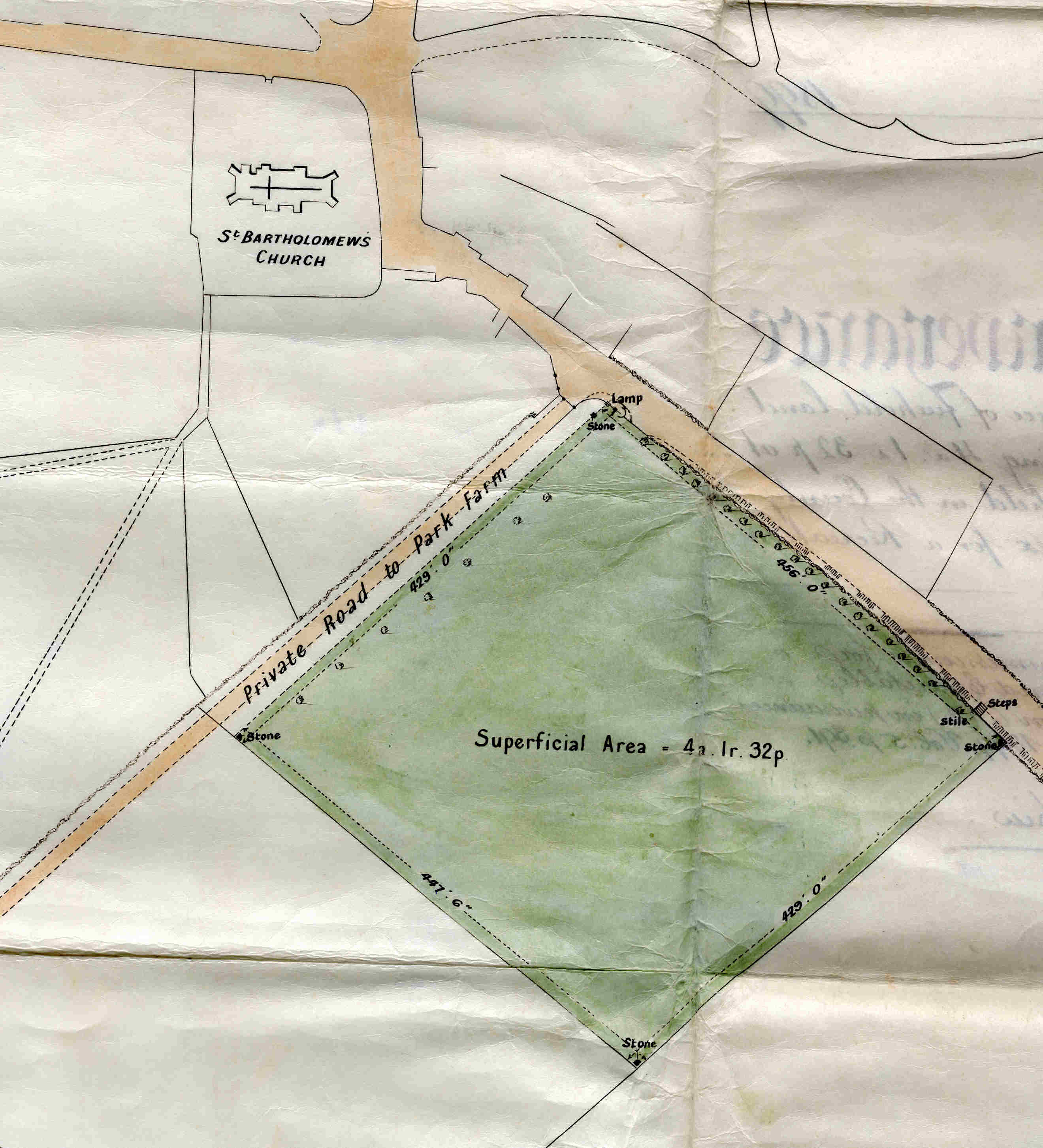
Plan showing location of Maresfield Recreation Ground from deed of conveyance

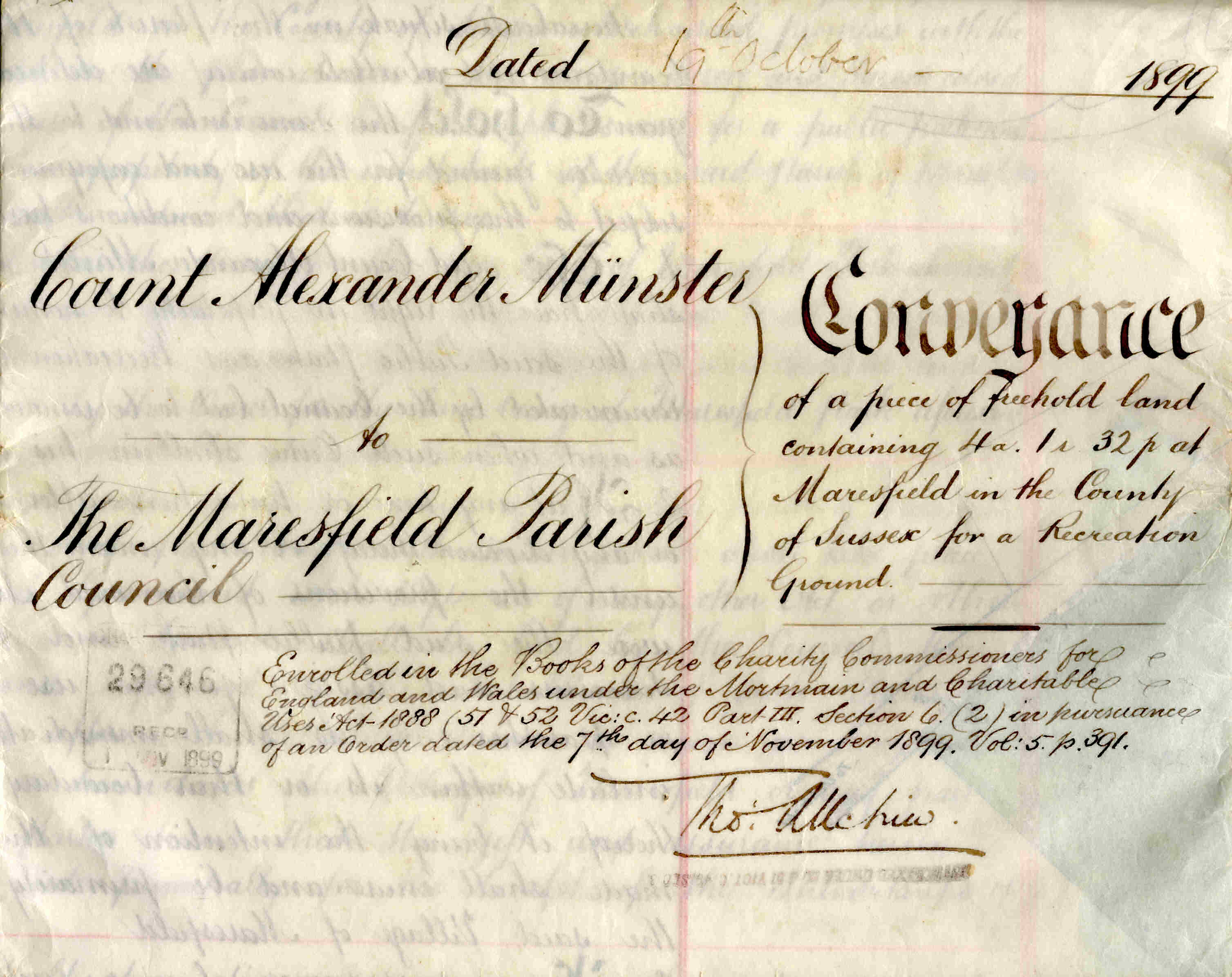
Title of Deed of Conveyance which transferred the recreation ground to Maresfield Parish Council

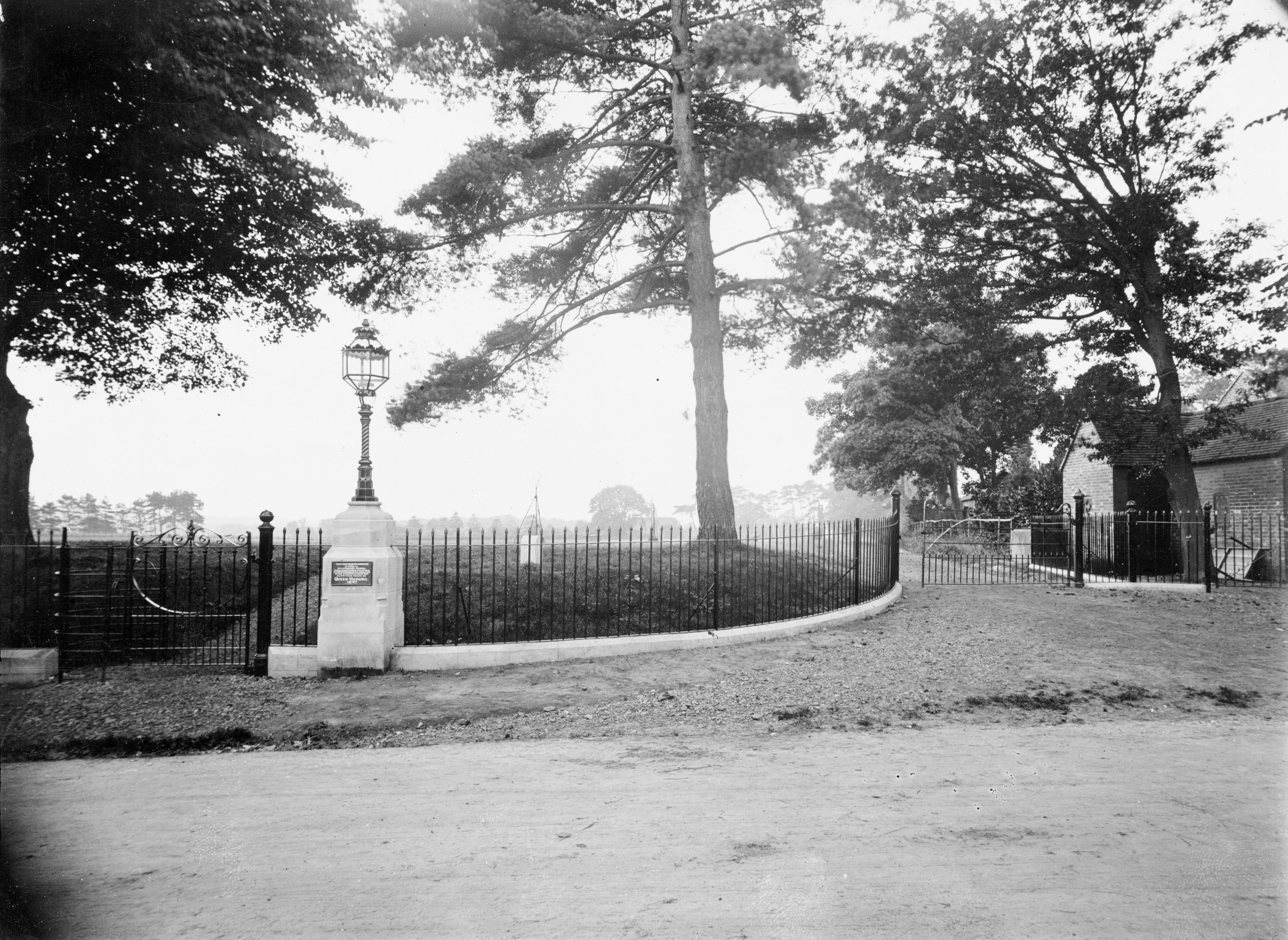
Entrance to the recreation ground in 1897

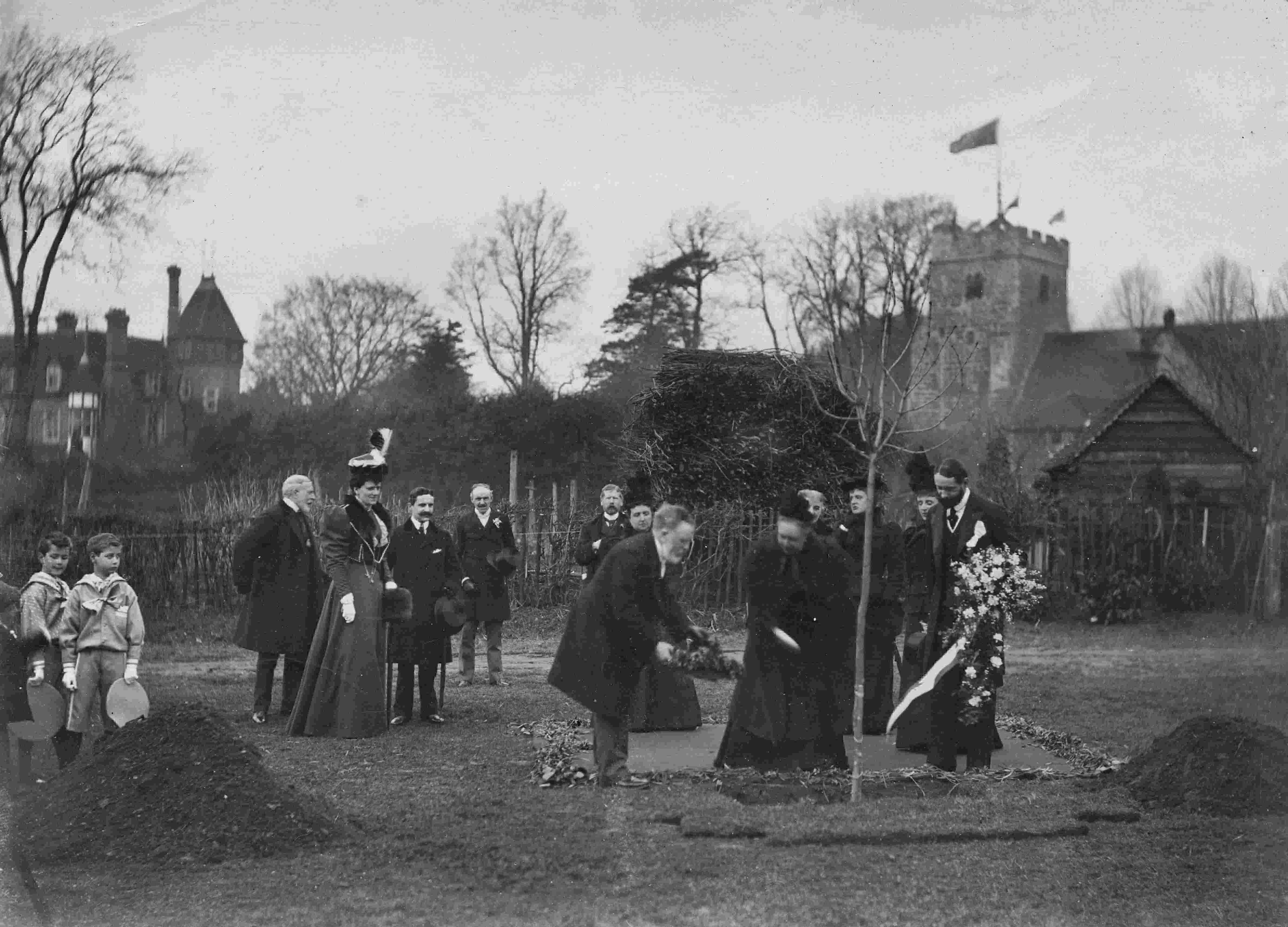
Planting of the ceremonial oak in 1897

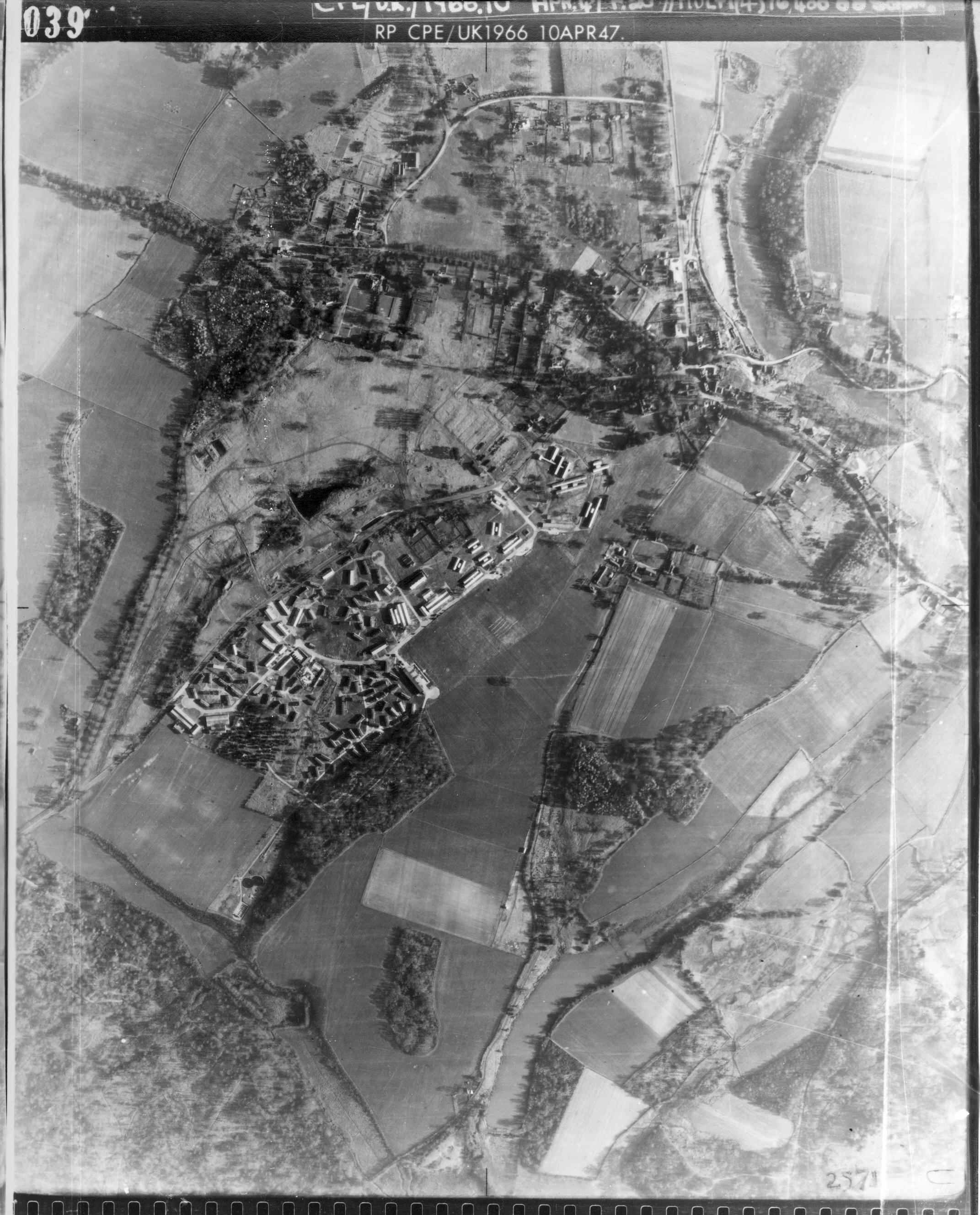
RAF 1947 aerial view of Maresfield army camp
