= Shelley baronets =

Set index for Shelley baronets

There have been three baronetcies created for members of the Shelley family, one in the Baronetage of England and two in the Baronetage of the United Kingdom. The three recipients of the titles represented two different branches of the family with a common ancestor in John Shelley of Michelgrove (died 1526). Although he never held any title, the most famous member of the family is the poet Percy Bysshe Shelley.

- Shelley baronets of Michelgrove (1611)
- Shelley baronets of Castle Goring (1806)
- Shelley-Sidney (later Sidney) baronets, of Penshurst Place (1818): see Viscount De L'Isle
