= Tuckfield =

Tuckfield is a surname. Notable people with the surname include:

- Alexander Tuckfield (born 2004), Australian Paralympic swimmer
- John Tuckfield (fl. 1550), English merchant and alderman
- Roger Tuckfield (c. 1685–1739), British landowner and politician
