= Sainthill =

Sainthill, or St. Hill (anciently spelt 'de Sweynthill') is an English surname of Norman origin.

Notable people with this surname include:

- Peter Sainthill (MP for Tiverton) (1593-1648), English politician known for his role in the English Civil War
- Sir Walter de Sweynthill (died circa 1340), English Knight who represented Devon in the Parliaments of Edward II and Edward III
- Peter Sainthill (died 1571), English politician
- Sir Peter Sainthill F.R.S. (1698- 1775), preeminent 18th century surgeon, who served as Master of the Company of Surgeons (1749-1750)
- Lieutenant-Colonel Windle St. Hill (1839-1918)
- Loudon Sainthill (1918-1969), Australian artist

Sainthill is also a given name:

- Sir Sainthill Eardley-Wilmot K.C.I.E. (1825-1929), British Civil Servant and Conservationist who served as Inspector-General of Forests

== See also ==
- Bradninch Manor, the family seat of the Sainthill (also spelt St. Hill) family from 1553
