= Edward Bridgeman =

Sheriff of Exeter, England (fl.1563)

- Arms of Bridgeman: Sable, ten plates on a chief argent a lion passant ermines

Sheriff of Exeter
- In office 1563

Personal details
- Born: 16th century England
- Children: 3+
- Relatives: John Bridgeman (grandson)

Edward Bridgeman was Sheriff of Exeter, Devon, in 1563. He is the ancestor of the Bridgeman baronets, the Earls of Bradford and the Viscounts Bridgeman. He had at least two sons, Thomas and Michael. His daughter Anastryce Bridgeman (c. 1540–1599) became the second wife of John Hooker (c. 1527–1601) (alias John Vowell) of Exeter, historian, writer, solicitor, antiquary, and civic administrator. His grandson John Bridgeman became Bishop of Chester in 1619.
