= Nicholas Hilliard =

English miniaturist (1547–1619)

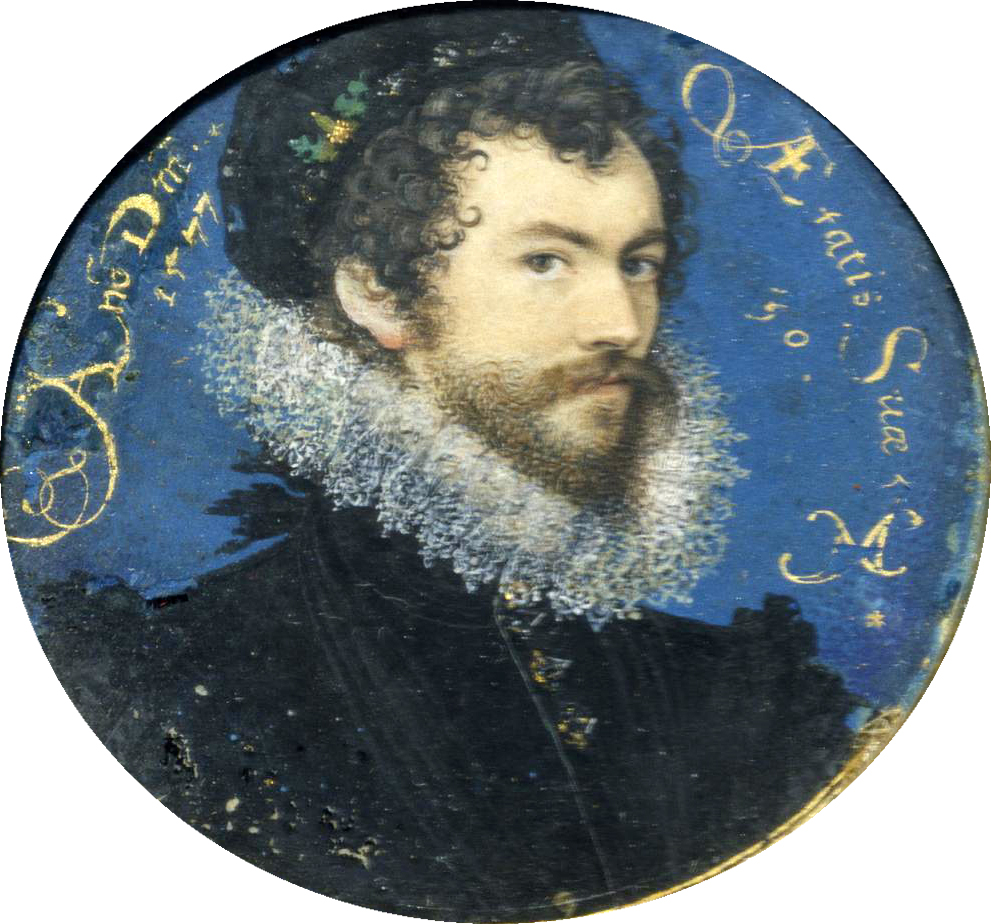
- Self-portrait, 1577
- Born: c. 1547; Exeter, England
- Died: before 7 January 1619 (aged 71–72); London, England
- Resting place: St Martin-in-the-Fields, Westminster
- Known for: Portrait miniatures
- Spouse: Alice Brandon (m. 1576; died 1611)
- Children: Daniel Hilliard; Elizabeth Hilliard; Francis Hilliard; Laurence Hilliard; Lettice Hilliard; Penelope Hilliard; Robert Hilliard
- Parents: Richard Hilliard; Laurence Wall
- Patrons: Elizabeth I; James I

Nicholas Hilliard (c. 1547 – before 7 January 1619) was an English goldsmith and limner best known for his portrait miniatures of members of the courts of Elizabeth I and James I of England. He mostly painted small oval miniatures, but also some larger cabinet miniatures, up to about 10 inches (25 centimetres) tall, and at least two famous half-length panel portraits of Elizabeth. He enjoyed continuing success as an artist, and continuing financial troubles, for forty-five years. His paintings still exemplify the visual image of Elizabethan England, very different from that of most of Europe in the late sixteenth century. Technically he was very conservative by European standards, but his paintings are superbly executed and have a freshness and charm that has ensured his continuing reputation as "the central artistic figure of the Elizabethan age, the only English painter whose work reflects, in its delicate microcosm, the world of Shakespeare's earlier plays."

== Early life and family ==
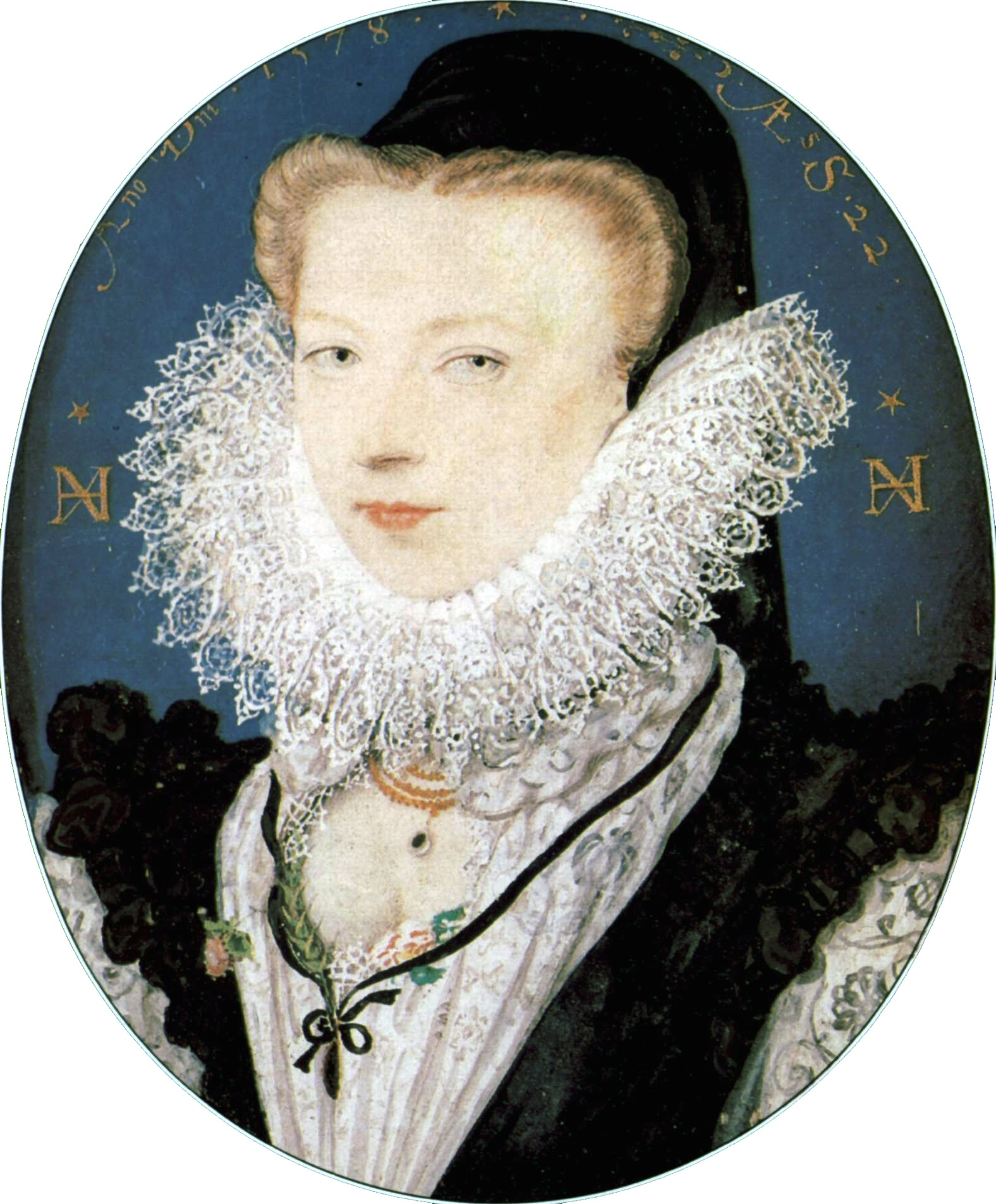
Hilliard's wife Alice, an example of the influence from French art in his work. 1578

Hilliard was born in Exeter in 1547. He was the son of Richard Hilliard (1519–1594) of Exeter, Devon, also spelt Hellyer, a goldsmith who became a staunch Protestant and was Sheriff of Exeter in 1568, by his marriage to Laurence, daughter of John Wall, a City of London goldsmith. He was one of four boys: two others became goldsmiths, and one a clergyman. Hilliard may have been a close relative of Grace Hiller (Hilliar), first wife of Theophilus Eaton (1590–1657), the co-founder of New Haven Colony in America.

He appears to have been attached at a young age to the household of the leading Exeter Protestant John Bodley, the father of Thomas Bodley who founded the Bodleian Library in Oxford. John Bodley went into exile on the accession of the Catholic Queen Mary I of England, and on 8 May 1557 Hilliard, then ten years old, was recorded in Geneva as one of an eleven-strong Bodley family group at a Calvinist service presided over by John Knox. Calvinism does not seem to have struck with Hilliard, but the fluent French he acquired abroad was later useful. Thomas Bodley, two years older, continued an intensive classical education under leading scholars in Geneva, but it is not clear to what extent Hilliard was given similar studies.

Hilliard painted a portrait of himself at the age of 13 in 1560 and is said to have executed one of Mary, Queen of Scots, when he was eighteen years old.

Hilliard apprenticed himself to the Queen's jeweller Robert Brandon (d. 1591), a goldsmith and city chamberlain of London, and Sir Roy Strong suggests that Hilliard may also have been trained in the art of limning by Levina Teerlinc during this period. She was the daughter of Simon Bening, the last great master of the Flemish manuscript illumination tradition, and became court painter to Henry VIII after Holbein's death. After his seven years' apprenticeship, Hilliard was made a freeman of the Worshipful Company of Goldsmiths in 1569. He set up a workshop with his younger brother John; another brother was also a goldsmith, and the youngest a clergyman. On 15 July 1576, at St Vedast church in Foster Lane, London, he married Brandon's daughter Alice (1556–1611) and they had seven children:

- Daniel Hilliard (b. 1578)
- Elizabeth Hilliard (b. 1579)
- Francis Hilliard (b. 1580)
- Laurence Hilliard (b. 1582)
- Lettice Hilliard (b. 1583)
- Penelope Hilliard (b. 1586)
- Robert Hilliard (b. 1588)

A stillborn son, Nicholas, was buried at Christmas in 1584.

== Career ==
=== Royal limner ===
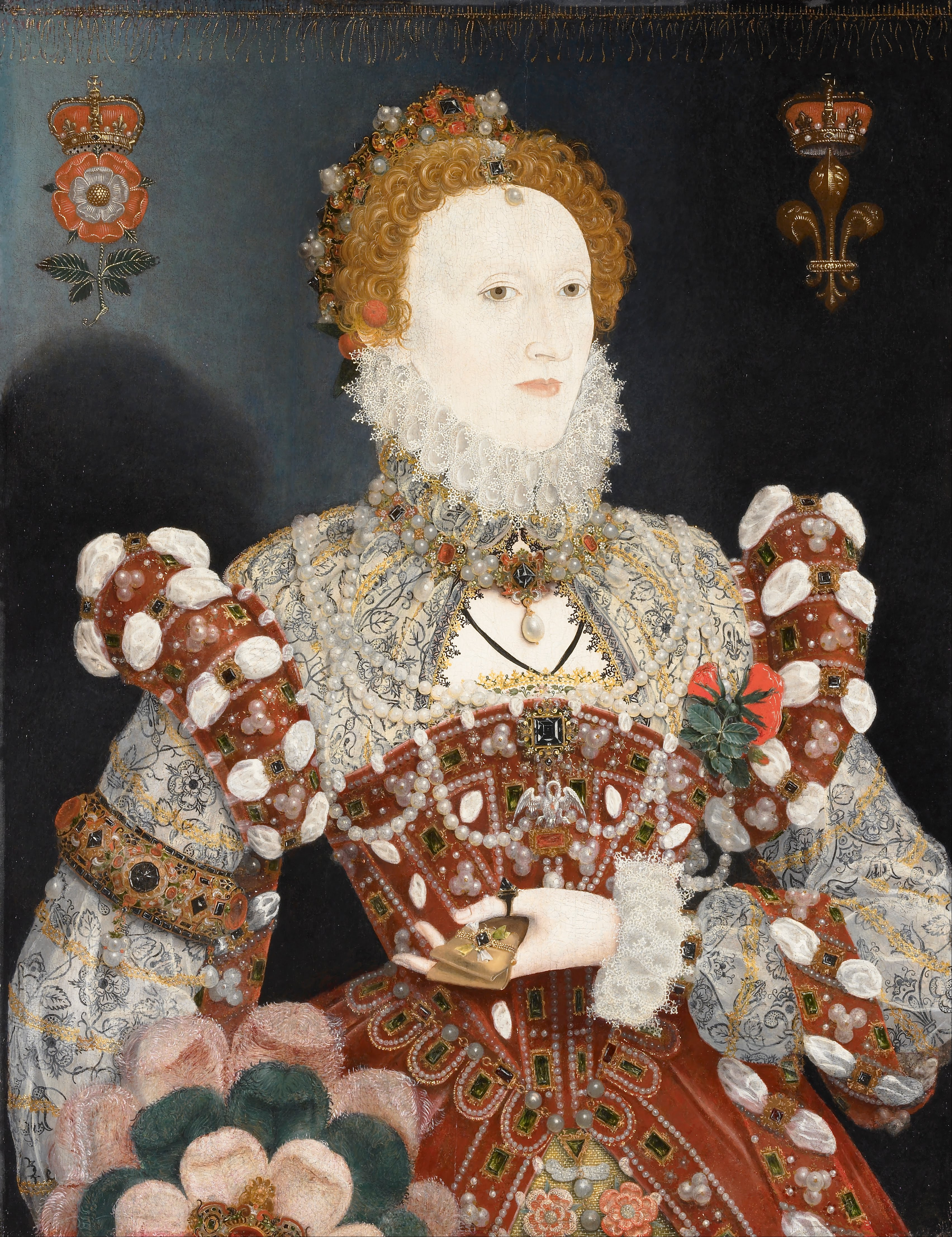
Elizabeth I, the "Pelican Portrait" c. 1572

Hilliard emerged from his apprenticeship at a time when a new royal portrait painter was "desperately needed". Two panel portraits long attributed to him, the "Phoenix" and "Pelican" portraits, are dated c. 1572–76. Hilliard was appointed limner (miniaturist) and goldsmith to Elizabeth I at an unknown date; his first known miniature of the Queen is dated 1572, and already in 1573 he was granted the reversion of a lease by the Queen for his "good, true and loyal service." In 1571 he had made "a booke of portraitures" for Robert Dudley, 1st Earl of Leicester, the Queen's favourite, which is likely to be how he became known to the Court; several of his children were named after Leicester and his circle.

Despite this patronage, in 1576 the recently married Hilliard left for France "with no other intent than to increase his knowledge by this voyage, and upon hope to get a piece of money of the lords and ladies here for his better maintenance in England at his return", carefully reported the English Ambassador in Paris, Sir Amyas Paulet, with whom Hilliard stayed for much of the time. Francis Bacon was attached to the embassy, and Hilliard did a miniature of him in Paris. He remained until 1578–79, mixing in the artistic circles round the court, staying with Germain Pilon and George of Ghent, respectively the Queen's sculptor and painter, and meeting Ronsard, who perhaps paid him the rather double-edged compliment later quoted by Hilliard: "the islands indeed seldom bring forth any cunning man, but when they do it is in high perfection".

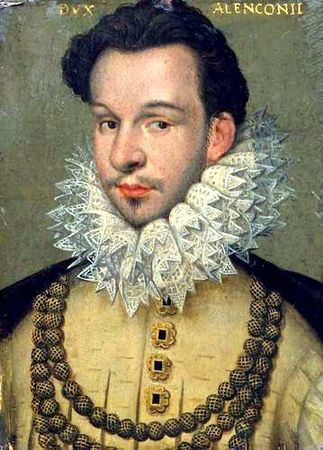
Miniature of d'Alençon, 1577

He appears in the papers of François, Duke of Anjou, a suitor of Queen Elizabeth, under the name of "Nicholas Belliart, peintre anglois", in 1577, receiving a stipend of 200 livres. The miniature of Madame de Sourdis, certainly the work of Hilliard, is dated 1577, in which year she was a maid of honour at the French court; and other portraits which are his work are believed to represent Gabrielle d'Estrées (niece of Madame de Sourdis), Princess of Condé, and Madame de Montgomery.

Money was a persistent problem for Hilliard. The typical price for a miniature seems to have been £3 – which compares well with prices charged by Cornelis Ketel in the 1570s of £1 for a head-and-shoulders portrait and £5 for a full-length. A portrait of the Earl of Northumberland cost £3 in 1586. Around the year 1574 Hilliard invested in a gold mine in Scotland with Cornelius de Vos and lost money. A potential scam, he still remembered it bitterly twenty-five years later. In 1599 Hilliard secured an annual allowance from the Queen of £40, and in 1617 managed to obtain a monopoly on producing miniatures and engravings of James I, something Elizabeth had refused in 1584. Nonetheless, he was briefly imprisoned in Ludgate Prison that year, after standing surety for the debt of another, and being unable to produce the amount. His father-in-law evidently had little trust in his financial acumen; his will of 1591 provided for his daughter by an allowance administered by the Goldsmiths' Company. The same year the Queen gave him £400, a large amount, after he made a second Great Seal, and perhaps bearing in mind that he had not had an annuity.

During a low point in his finances, in July 1601 Hilliard wrote to the Secretary of State Robert Cecil acknowledging the annuity of £40, but asking permission to retire from London and live more cheaply in the countryside. He explained that he had trained apprentices who now competed with him in the private painting market. Hilliard asked that Cecil employ his son as a clerk, because he could not keep him in his own trade.

21st century research on two paintings at Waddesdon Manor has transformed our understanding of his work as two large-scale paintings have been newly attributed to him. The portraits, of Sir Amias Paulet and Elizabeth, are painted on French oak panels, not the Baltic oak commonly used in England, and are thought to date to Hilliard's time in France. The new data support Sir Roy Strong's 1983 attribution of the portrait of Elizabeth to Hilliard.

=== Later career ===
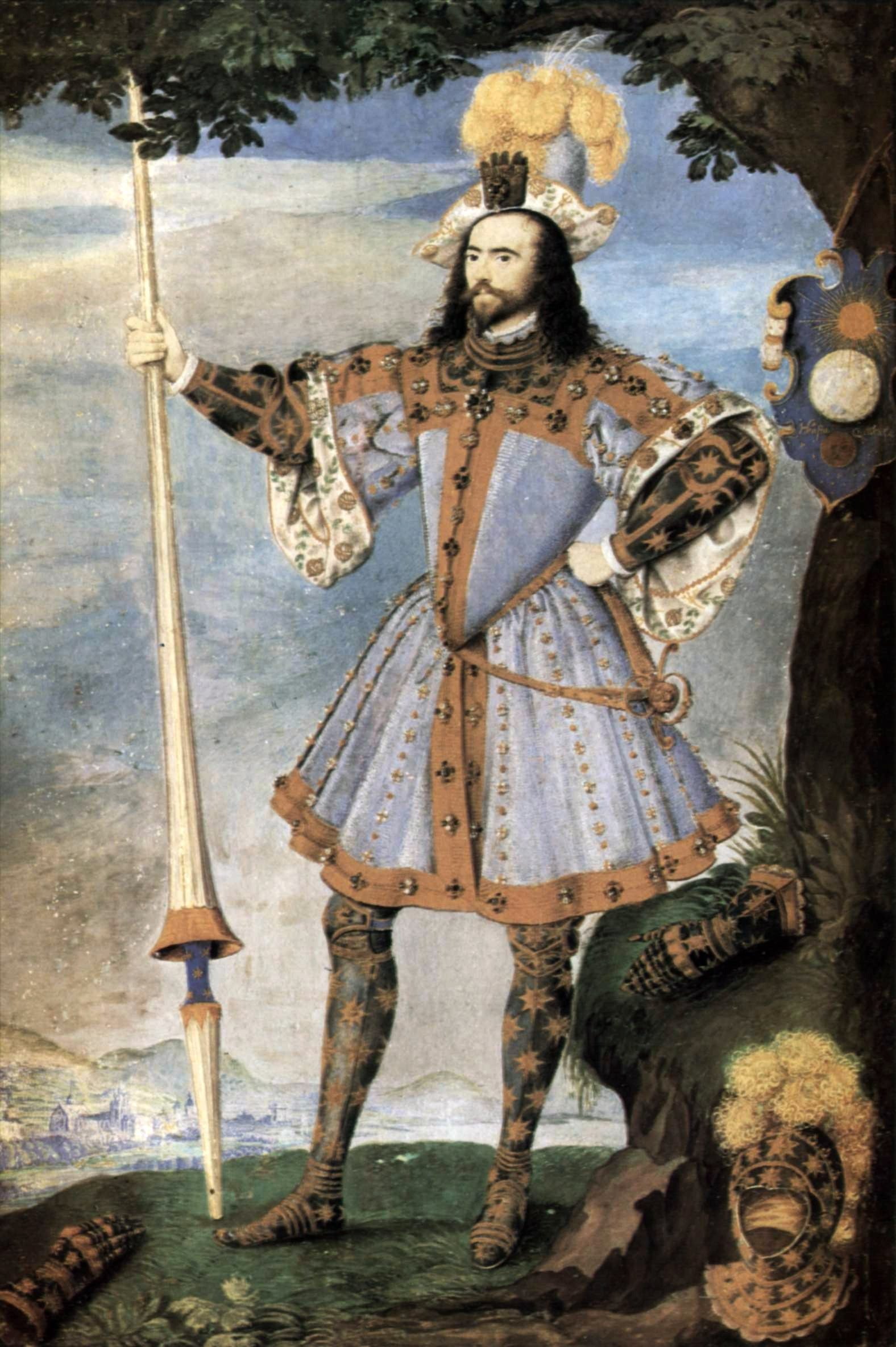
Large miniature of George Clifford, 3rd Earl of Cumberland, by Hilliard, c. 1590, after his appointment as the Queen's Champion, in tilting attire (which survives) with the Queen's glove as her favour pinned to his hat. 25.2 × 17.5 cm.

After his return from France he lived and worked in a house in Gutter Lane, off Cheapside, from 1579 to 1613, when his son and pupil Laurence took it over, carrying on in business for many decades. Hilliard had moved to an unknown address in the parish of St Martin-in-the-Fields, out of the city and nearer the Court. Strong describes the opening of the shop as "a revolution" which soon broadened the clientele for miniatures from the Court to the gentry, and by the end of the century to well-off city merchants.

Apart from Laurence, who continued in a "feeble" version of his father's style, his pupils included Isaac Oliver, by far the most important, and Rowland Lockey. He appears to have given lessons to amateurs also; a letter from a young lady being "finished" in London in 1595 says: "For my drawing, I take an hour in the afternoon ... My Lady ... telleth me, when she is well, that she will see if Hilliard will come and teach me, if she can by any means, she will".

He continued to work as a goldsmith, and produced some spectacular "picture boxes" or jewelled lockets for miniatures, worn round the neck, such as the Lyte Jewel in the British Museum, which, typically, was given by James I (more generous in this respect than Elizabeth) to a courtier, Thomas Lyte, in 1610. The Armada Jewel, given by Elizabeth to Sir Thomas Heneage and the Drake Jewel given to Sir Francis Drake are the best known examples. As part of the cult of the Virgin Queen, courtiers were rather expected to wear the Queen's likeness, at least at Court. Elizabeth had her own collection of miniatures, kept locked in a cabinet in her bedroom, wrapped in paper and labelled, with the one labelled "My Lord's picture" containing a portrait of Leicester.

His appointment as miniaturist to the Crown included the old sense of a painter of illuminated manuscripts and he was commissioned to decorate important documents, such as the founding charter of Emmanuel College, Cambridge (1584), which has an enthroned Elizabeth within an elaborate framework of Flemish-style Renaissance ornament. He also seems to have designed woodcut title-page frames and borders for books, some of which bear his initials. As a New Year's day gift in 1584, Hilliard presented Queen Elizabeth with a picture of the story of five wise and foolish virgins.

He was in high favour with James I as well as with Elizabeth, receiving from the King a special patent of appointment, dated 5 May 1617, granting him a sole licence for royal portraits in engraved form for twelve years; he had already been producing these, although probably usually using the immigrant Renold Elstrack to actually engrave the plates. James's more lavish presentation of portraits had its effect on the quality of the work from the Hilliard workshop. When Roger Manners, 5th Earl of Rutland returned from an embassy to Denmark, sixteen members of his party were given chains of gold with the King's picture, and others received just a picture.

The esteem of his contemporaries for Hilliard is testified to by John Donne, who in a poem called The Storm (1597) praises the work of this artist. The exact date of his death is not known, but he was buried on 7 January 1619 in the church of St Martin-in-the-Fields, Westminster. In his will, which was made on Christmas Eve 1618, he left twenty shillings to the poor of the parish, thirty between his two sisters, some goods to his maidservant, and all the rest of his effects to his son, Laurence Hilliard, his sole executor.

By far the largest collection of his work is in the Victoria and Albert Museum, London. The National Portrait Gallery, London and British Museum have several others. The conditions in which miniatures have been kept ensure that many remain in excellent condition, and have avoided the attention of restorers, although fading of pigments, and oxidization of silver paint are common.

== Style ==
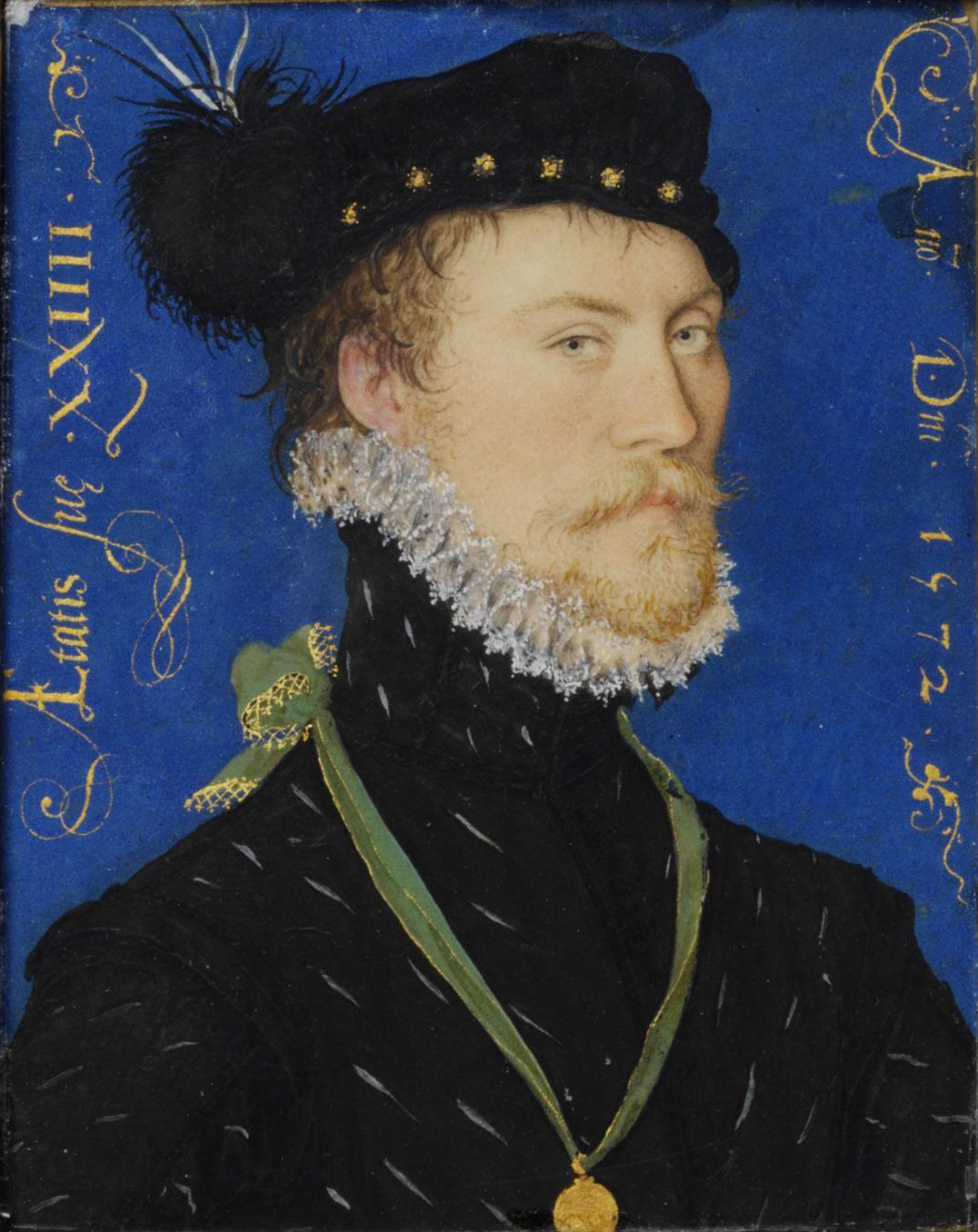
Unknown man of 24, 1572, 2 3/8 in × 1 7/8 in (60 mm × 50 mm), V&A.

He was the author of an important treatise on miniature painting, now called The Art of Limning (c. 1600), preserved in the Bodleian Library. Although it was once believed that the author of that treatise was John de Critz, Serjeant Painter to James I, from instructions by Hilliard for the benefit of one of his pupils, perhaps Isaac Oliver, more recent scholarship holds that the Art "can be dated rather closely and established convincingly" as the work of Hilliard.

The masters mentioned in The Art of Limning are Hans Holbein the Younger, Henry VIII's court painter, and Albrecht Dürer, whom he probably only knew from his prints. Both were dead by the time of Hilliard's birth, and in many respects he is more conservative even than Holbein. He also learned from French art, including their chalk drawings, and refers to the artist and theoretical writer Gian Paolo Lomazzo. English art was distinctly provincial, and Hilliard's art is a world away from that of the early-Baroque Italian artists of his time, or his close contemporary El Greco (1541–1614).

In the Art of Limning he cautioned against all but the minimal use of chiaroscuro modelling that we see in his works, reflecting the views of his patron Elizabeth: "seeing that best to show oneself needeth no shadow of place but rather the open light ... Her Majesty .. chose her place to sit for that purpose in the open alley of a goodly garden, where no tree was near, nor any shadow at all ..."

He emphasises the need to catch "the grace in countenance, in which the affections appear, which can neither be well used nor well-judged of but by the wiser sort". So the "wise drawer" should "watch" and "catch these lovely graces, witty smilings, and these stolen glances which suddenly like lightning pass and another countenance taketh place". His normal technique (except for duplicates of royal images) was to paint the whole face in the presence of the sitter, probably in at least two sittings. He kept a number of prepared flesh-coloured blanks ready, in different shades, to save time on laying the "carnation" ground. He then painted the outlines of the features very faintly with a "pencil", actually a very fine pointed squirrel-hair brush, before filling these out by faint hatchings. He added to the techniques available, especially for clothes and jewels, often exploiting the tiny shadows cast by thick dots of paint to give a three-dimensionality to pearls and lace. A few half-finished miniatures give a good idea of his working technique. He probably made few drawings; certainly few have survived.

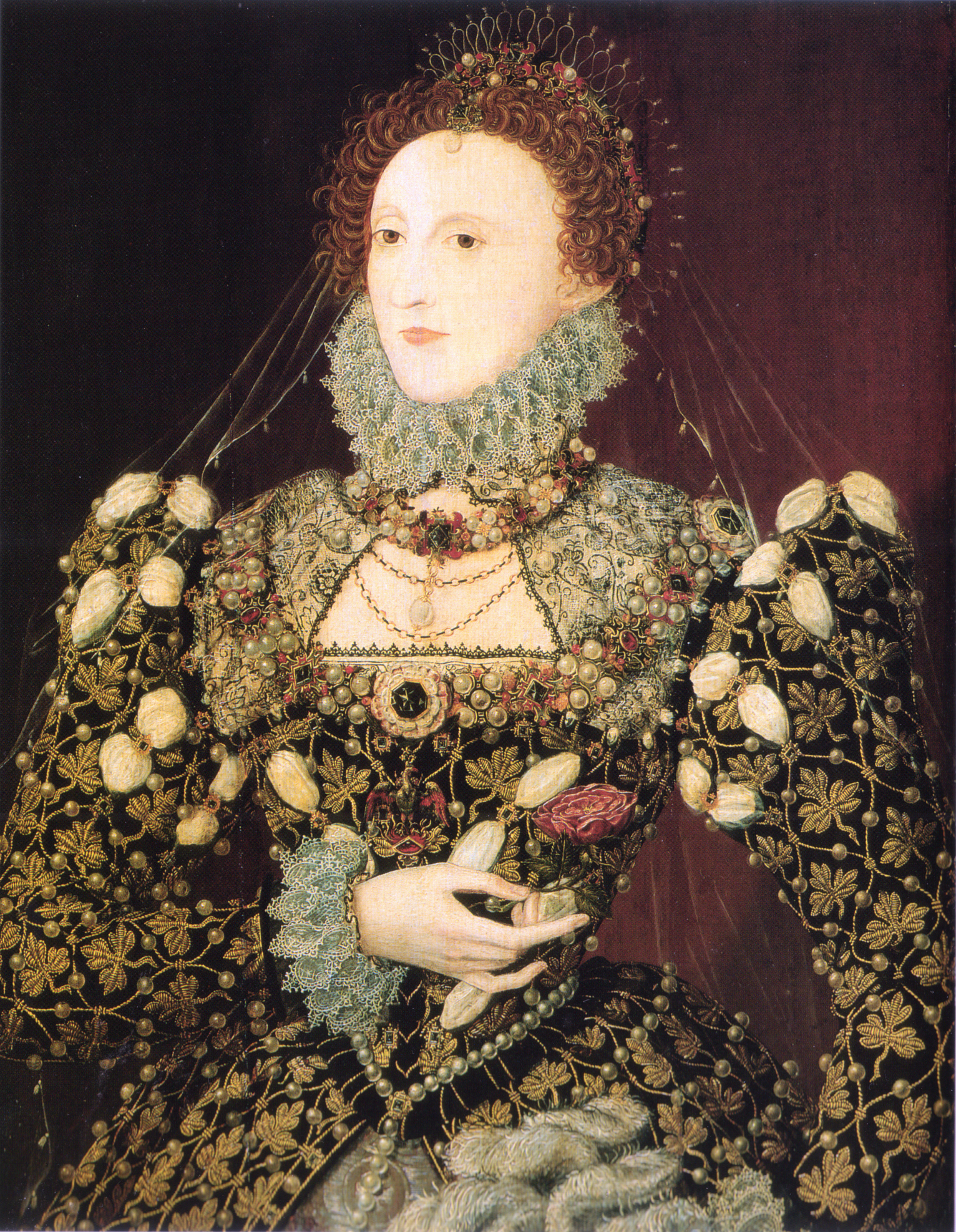
Elizabeth I, the "Phoenix" portrait, c. 1575

His style shows little development after the 1570s, apart from developing some technical refinements, except that many of his later repetitions of James I and his family are much weaker than his early works. James did not like sitting for his portrait and Hilliard probably had few sittings with him. From the 1590s on, his old pupil Isaac Oliver was a competitor, who was appointed as Limner to the new Queen Anne of Denmark in 1604, and then to Henry Frederick, Prince of Wales when he established his own household in 1610. Oliver had travelled abroad and developed a more modern style than his master, and was certainly better at perspective drawing, though he could not match Hilliard in freshness and psychological penetration.

== Gallery ==
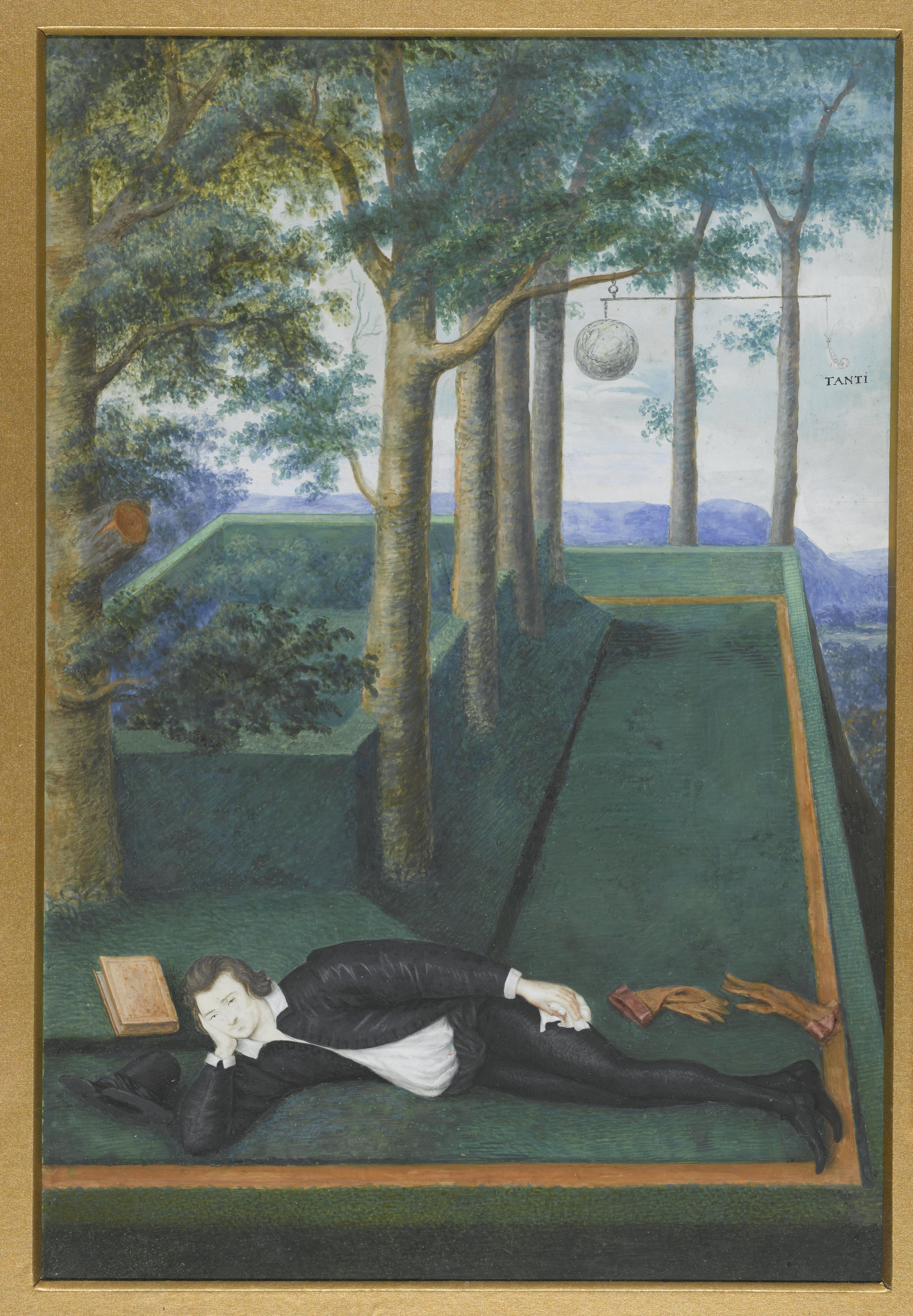
Henry Percy, 9th Earl of Northumberland, the "Wizard Earl", 1590–95.

=== Panel portraits ===
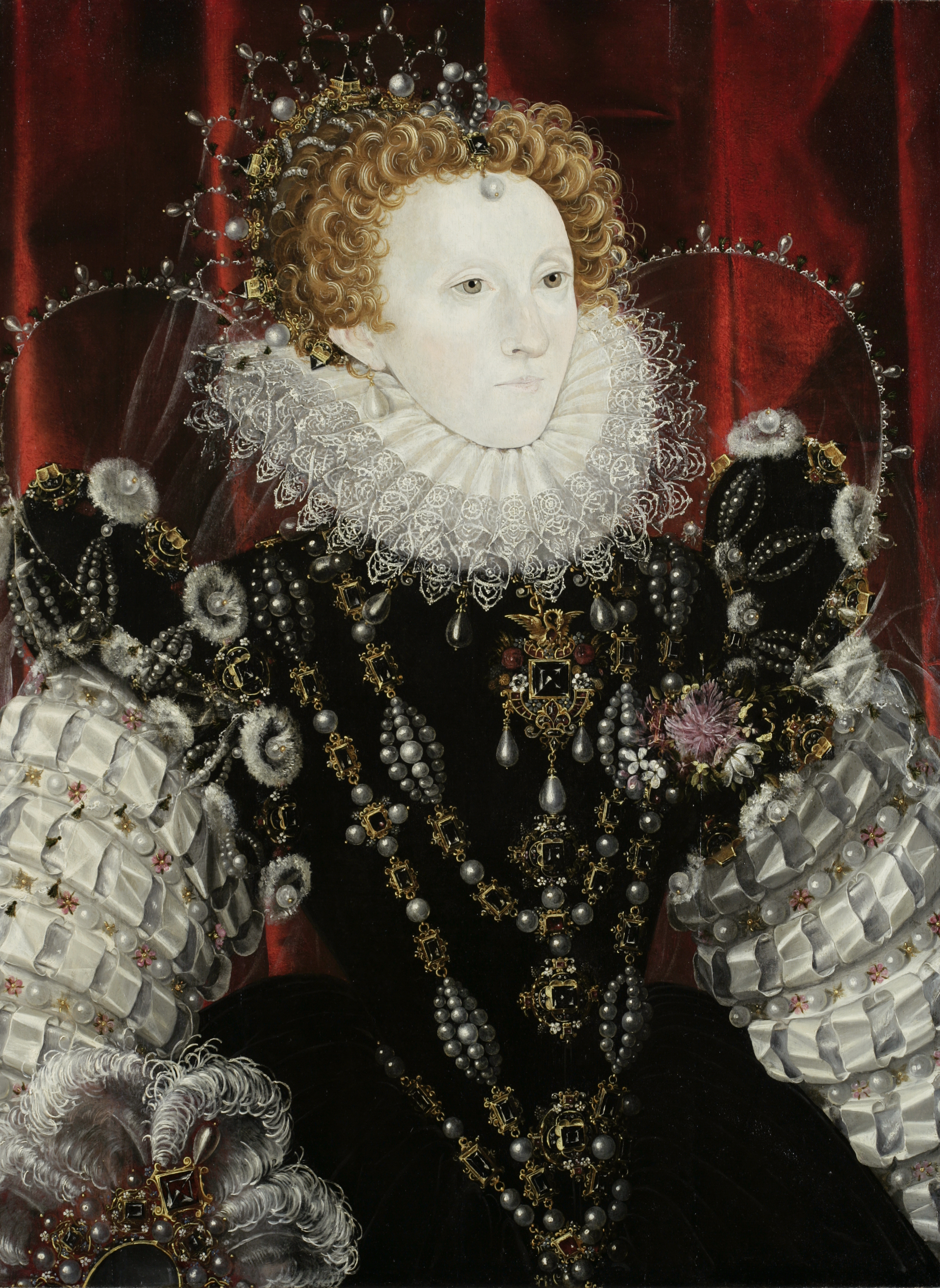
Elizabeth I, 1576–78

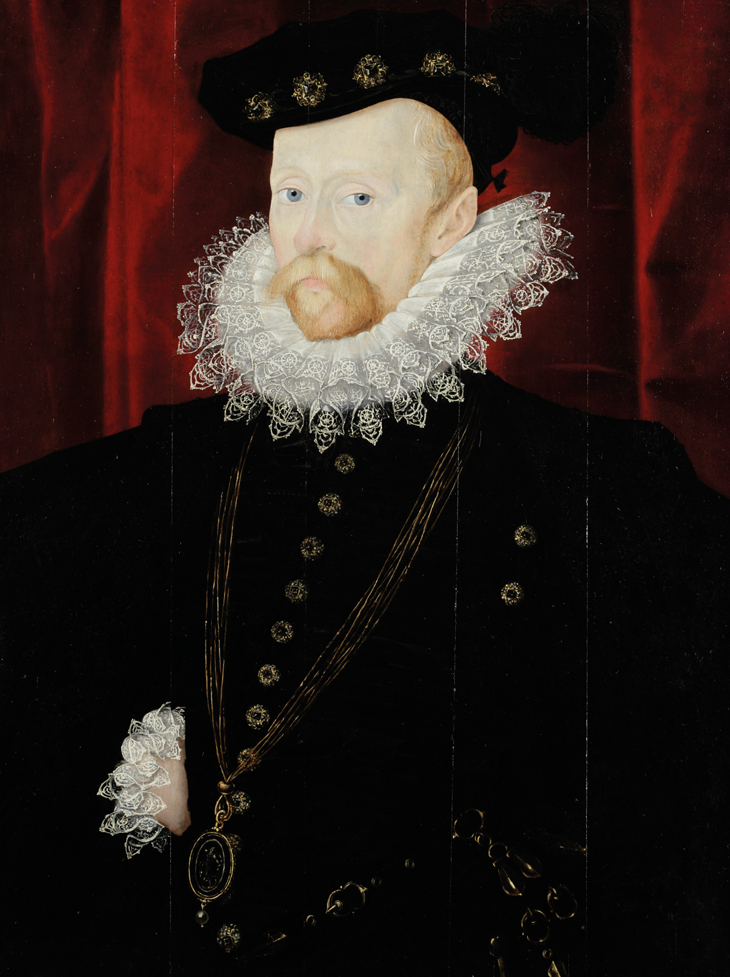
Sir Amias Paulet, 1576–78

=== Portrait miniatures ===
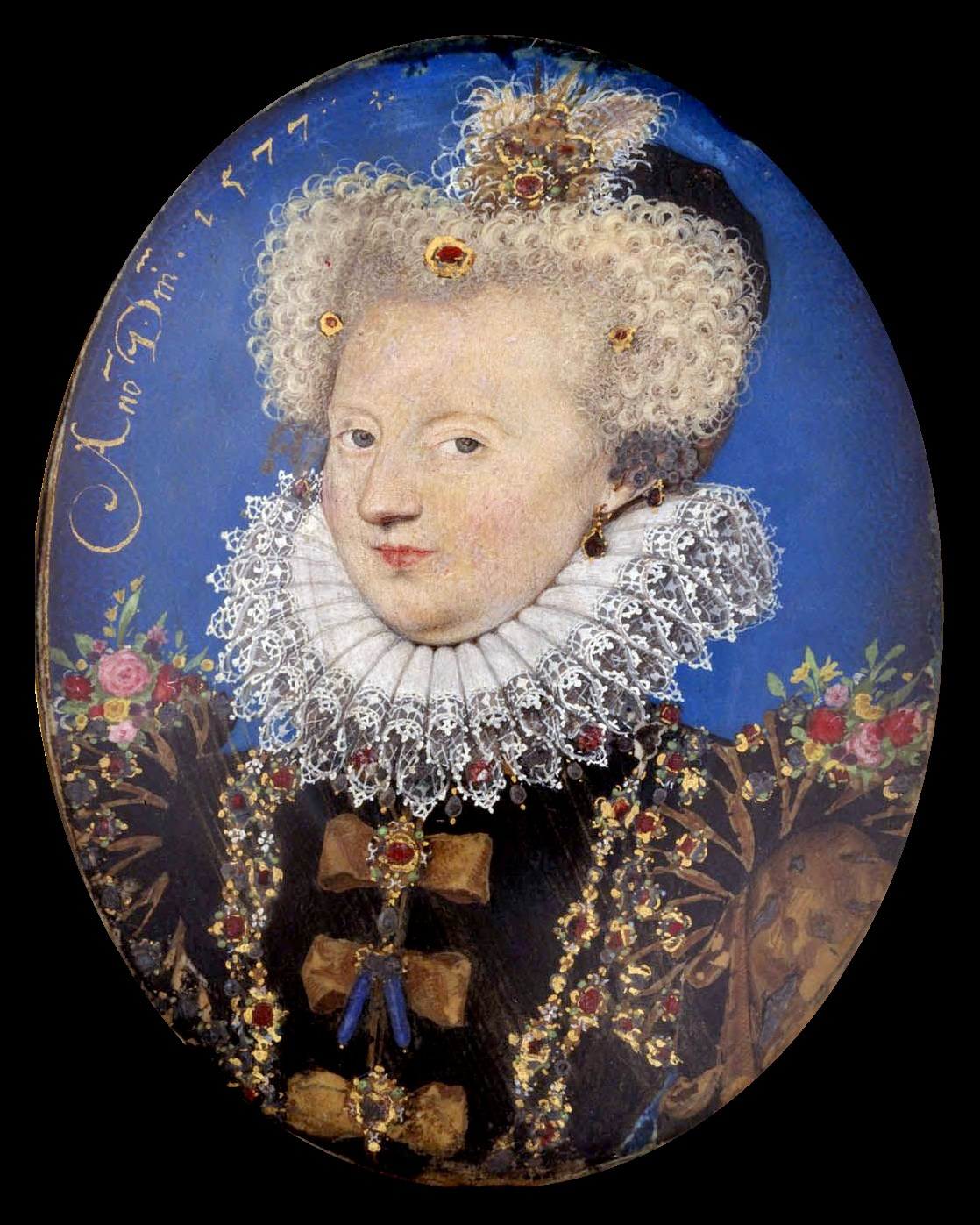
Margaret of Valois, Queen of Navarre, 1577

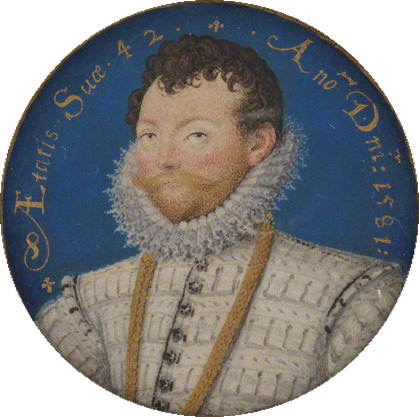
Sir Francis Drake, 1581

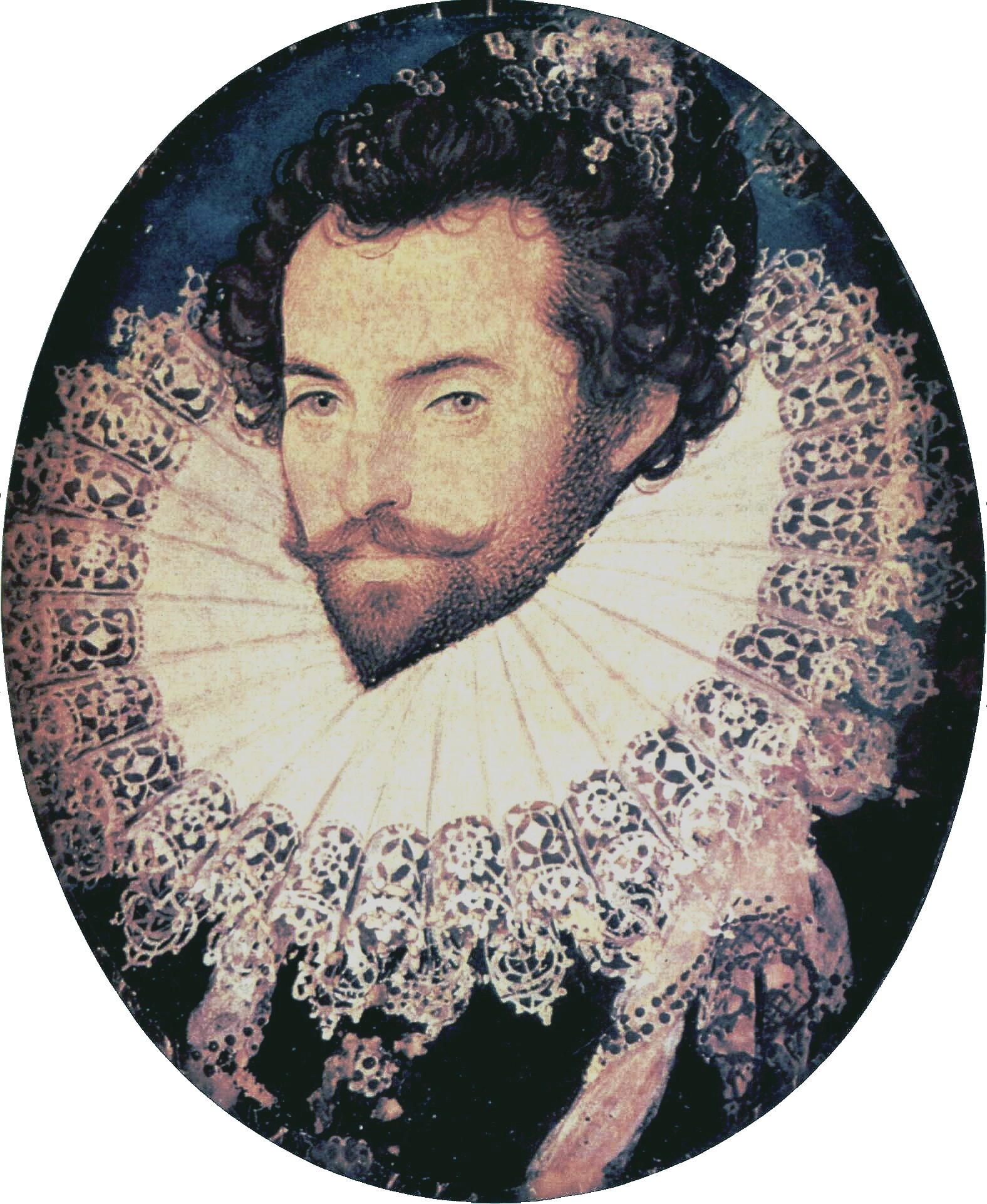
Sir Walter Raleigh, 1585

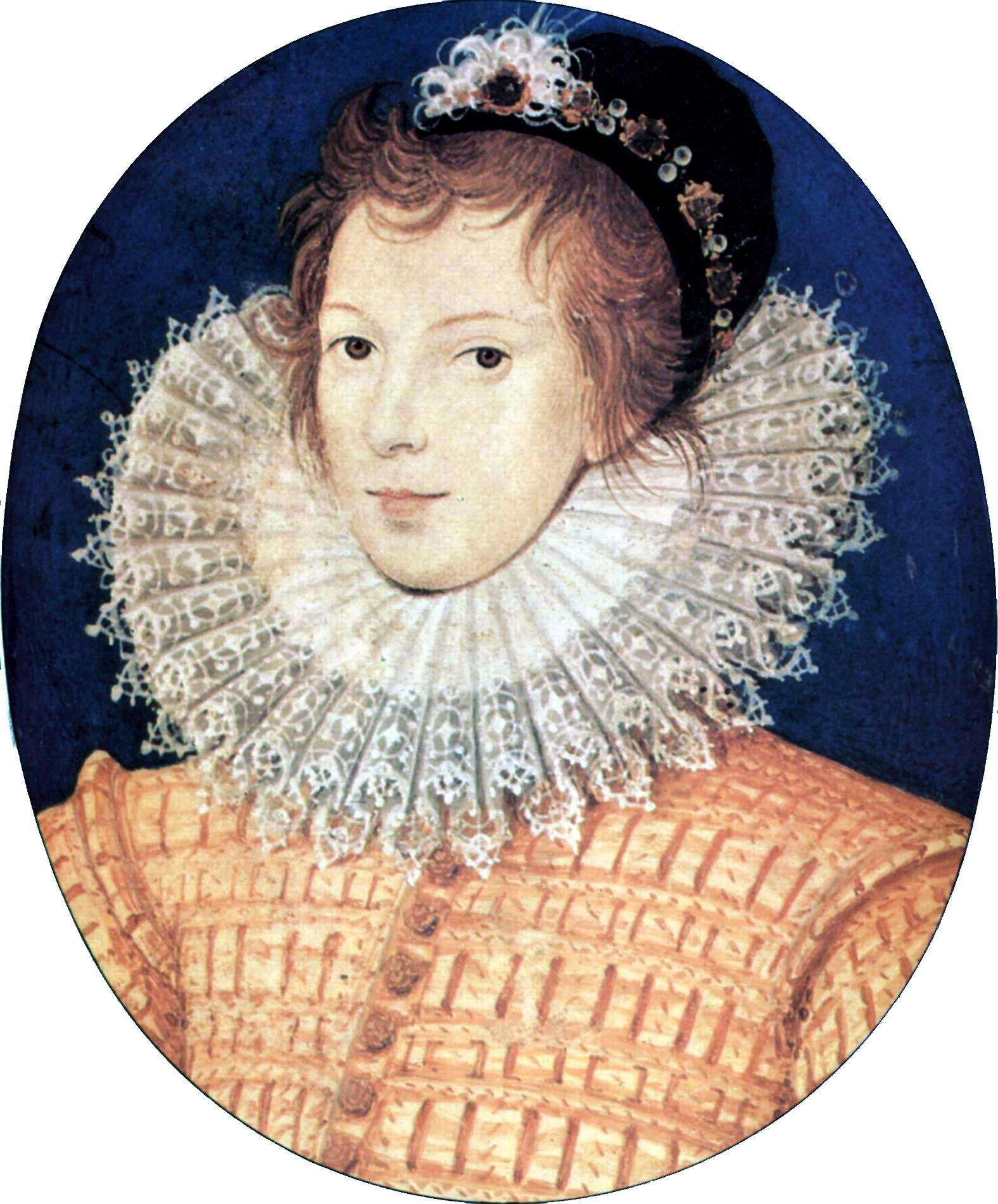
Unknown youth, 1585, V&A

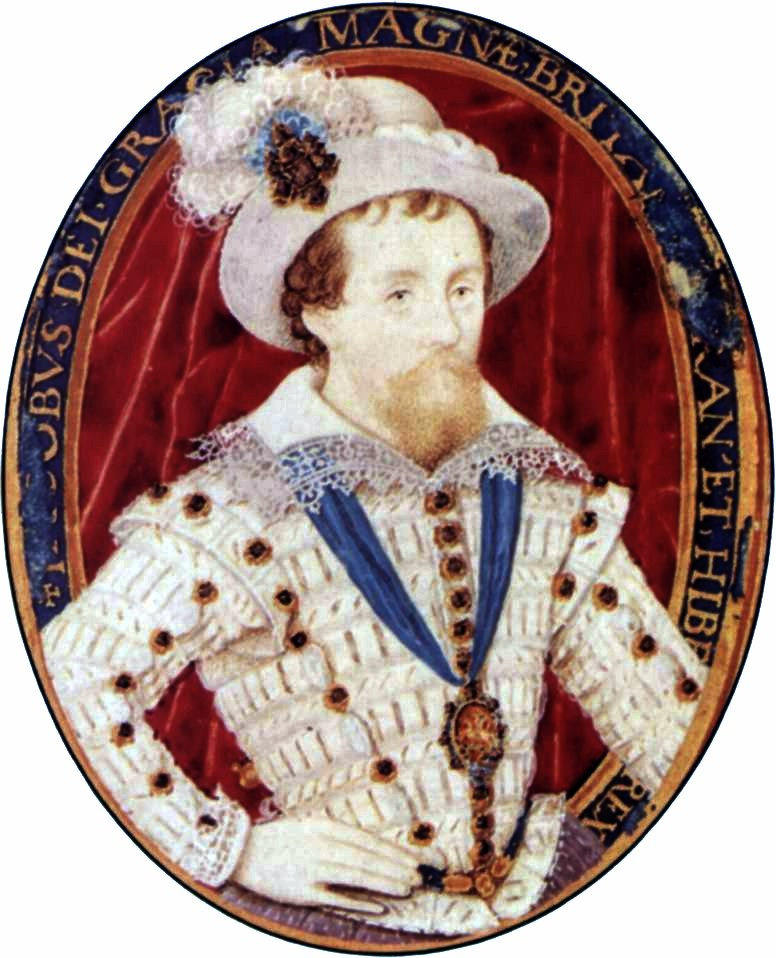
James I, 1603–9, V&A

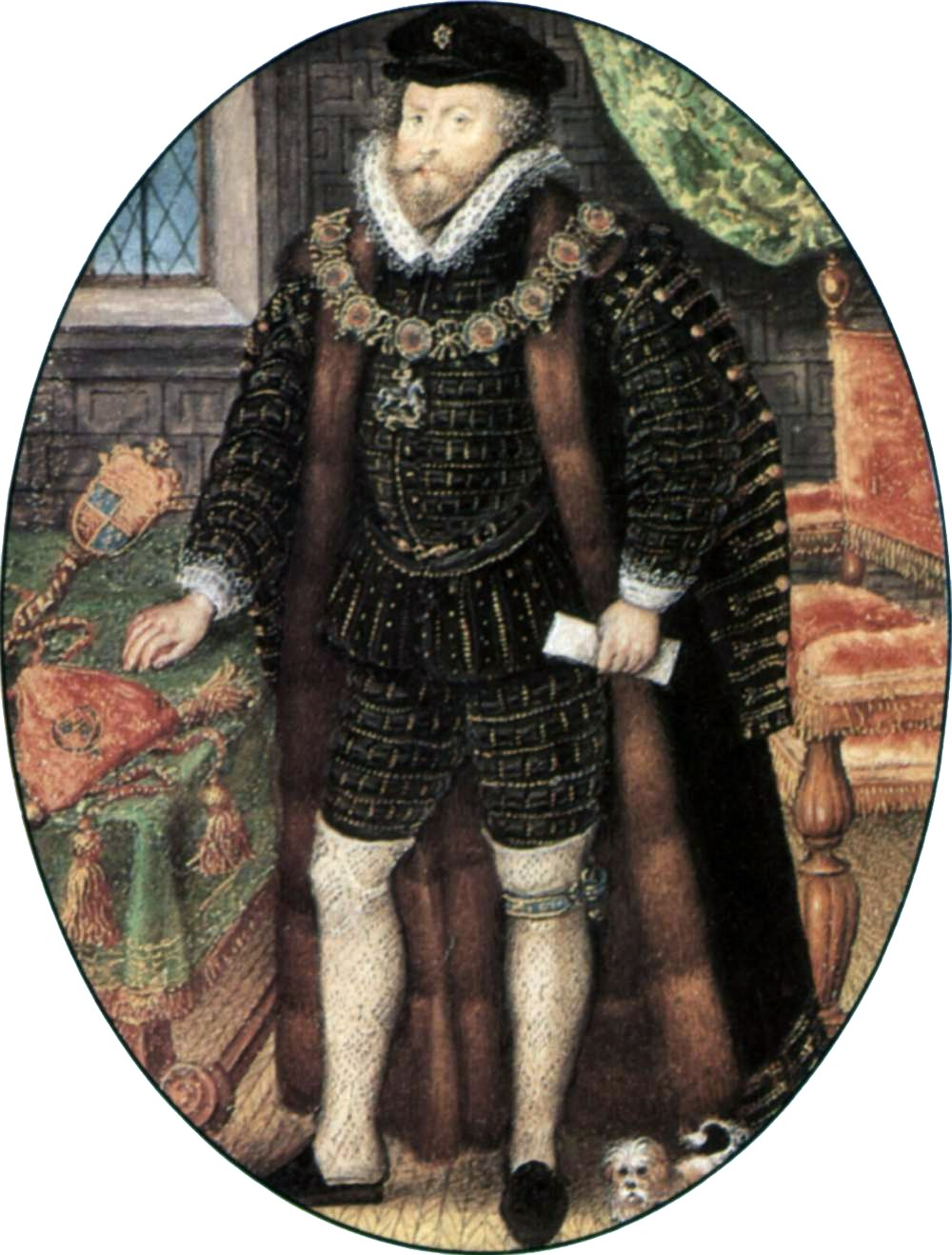
Christopher Hatton c. 1589

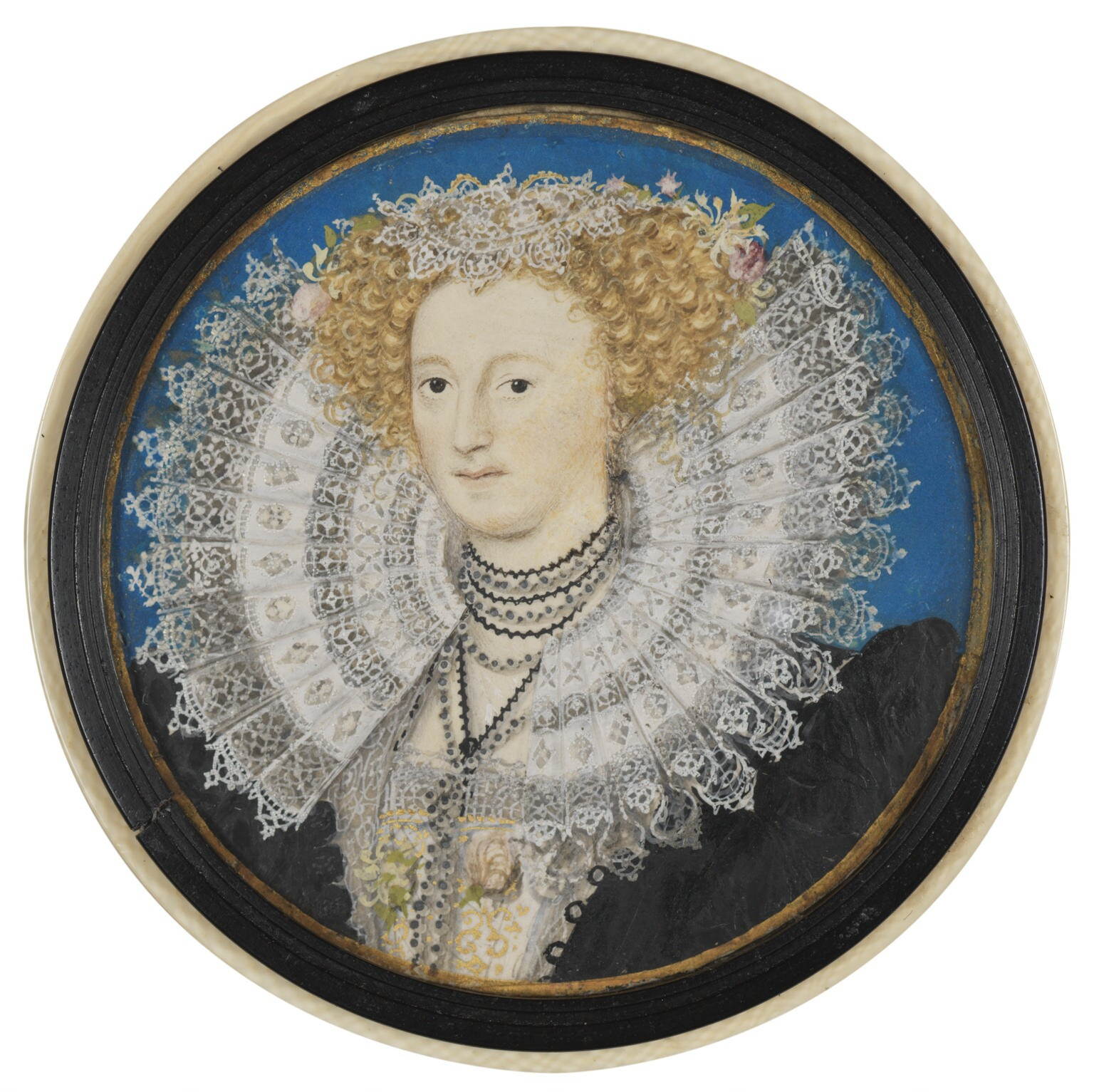
Mary Sidney, Countess of Pembroke c. 1590

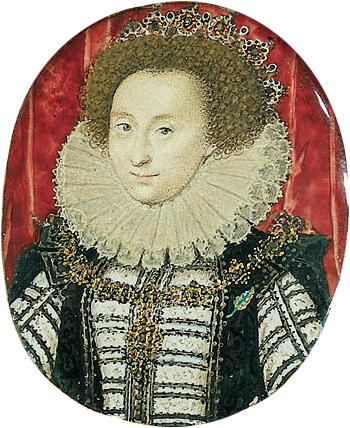
Lettice Knollys, Countess of Leicester c. 1590–1595

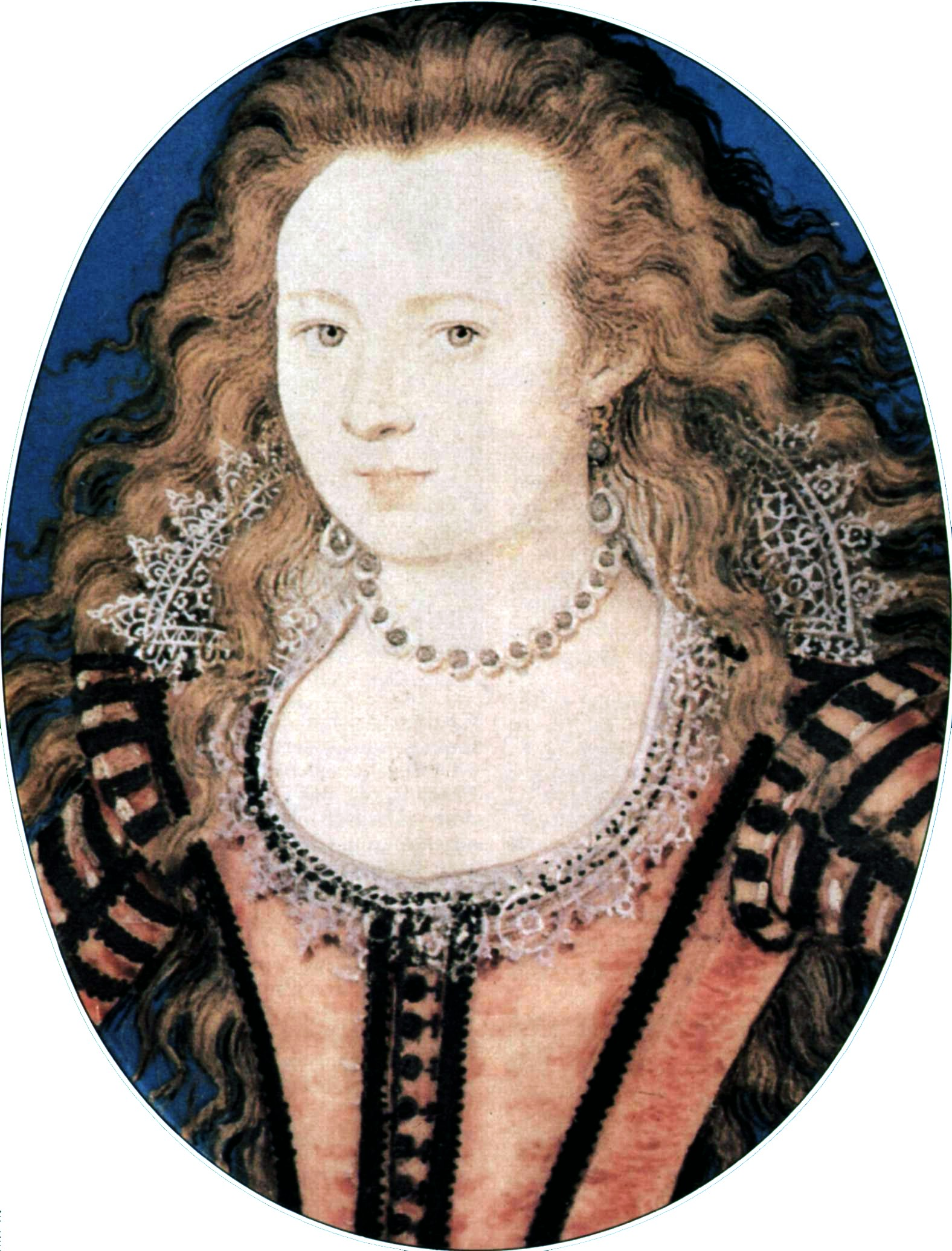
Elizabeth, Queen of Bohemia, daughter of James I, 1605–10

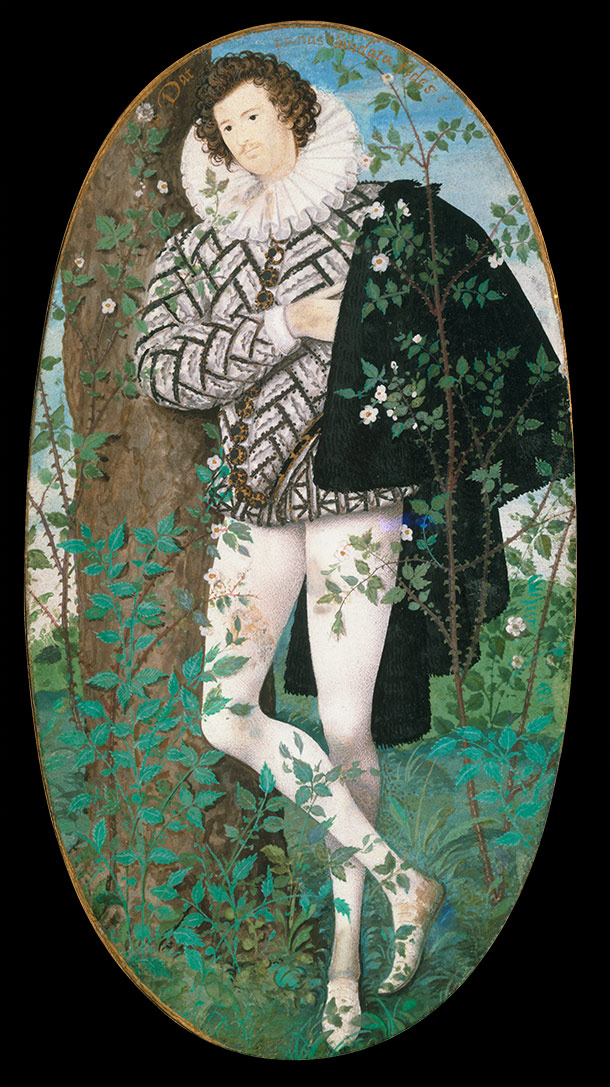
Young Man Among Roses, c. 1585–1595, Victoria & Albert Museum. Believed to be Robert Devereux, 2nd Earl of Essex

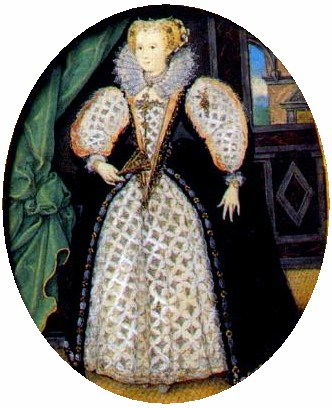
Portrait miniature thought to be Penelope Devereux, Lady Rich, c. 1590

Elizabeth I

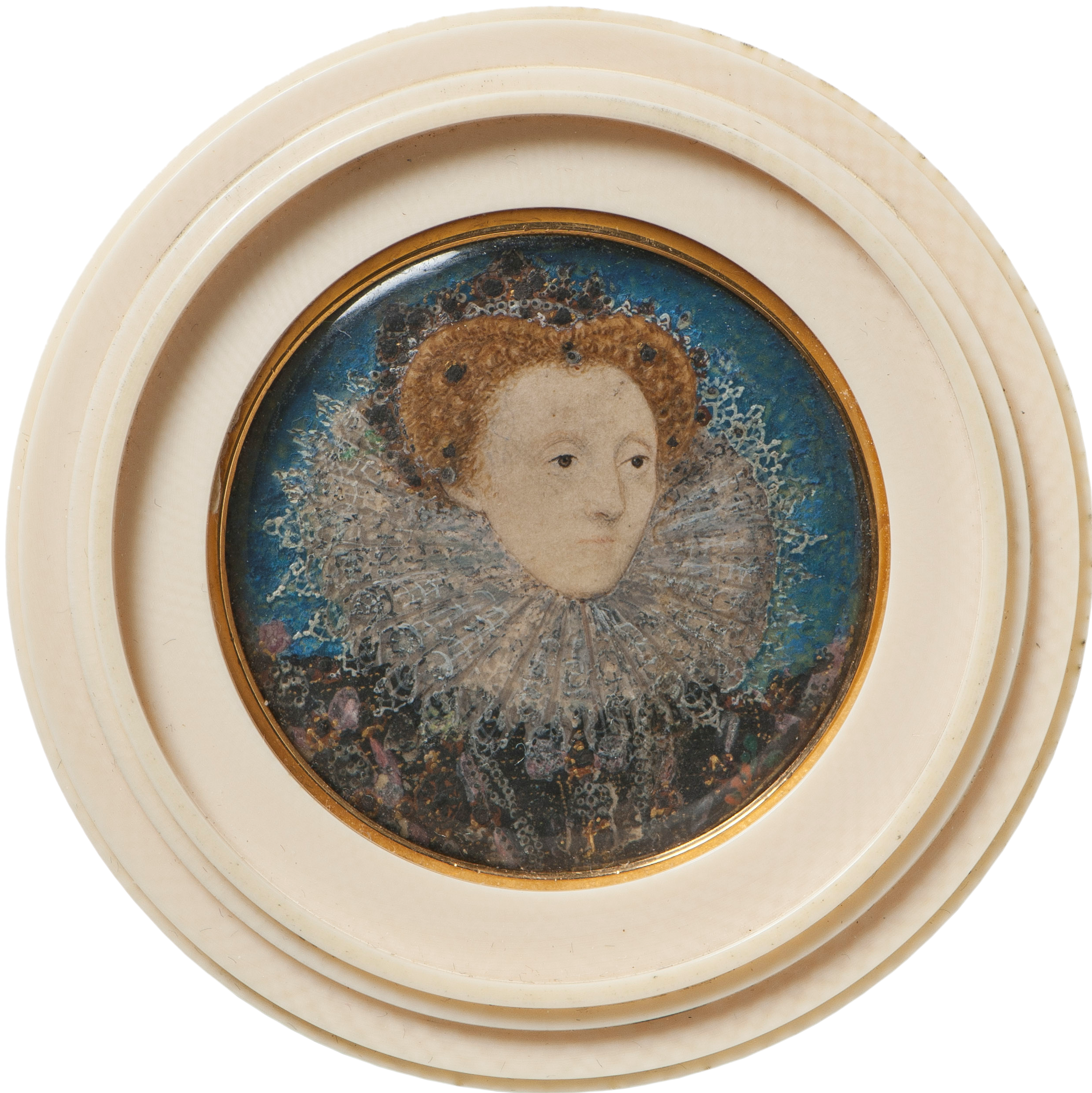
Miniature of Elizabeth I, c. 1586–87, Nationalmuseum, Stockholm.

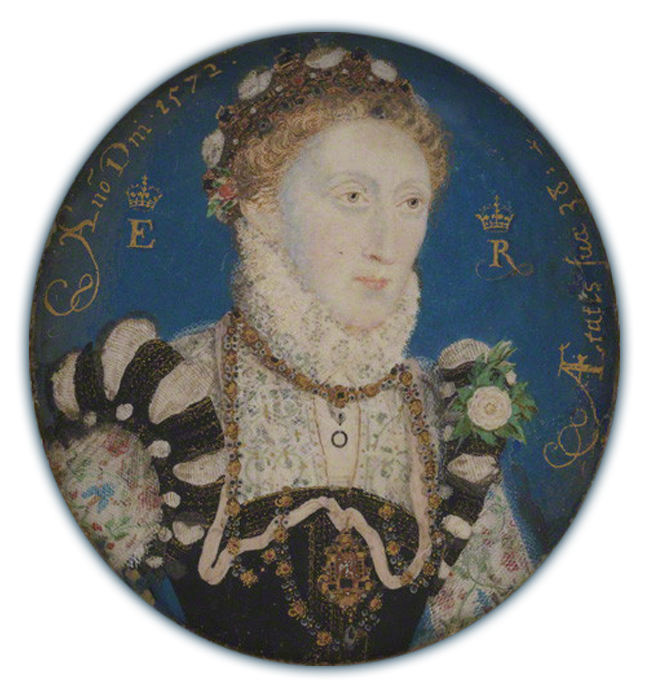
Miniature of Elizabeth I, 1572, National Portrait Gallery, London. Hilliard's earliest miniature of Elizabeth, executed when she was 38 years old.

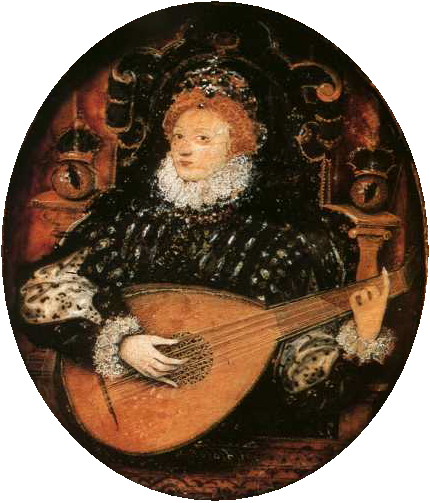
Elizabeth I playing the lute c. 1580

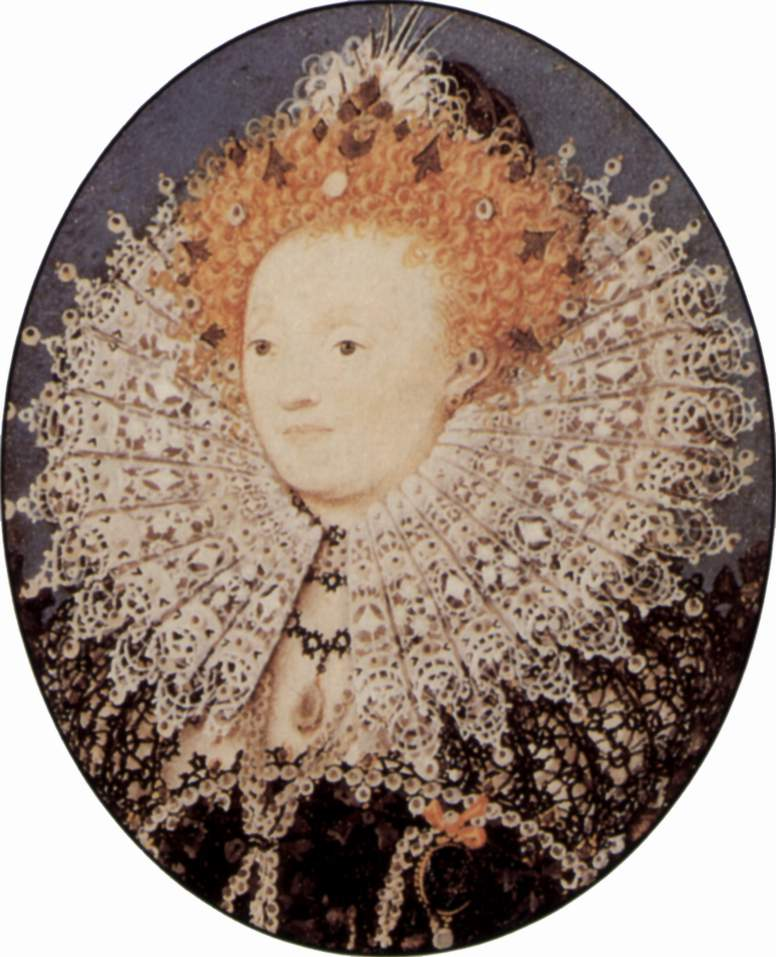
c. 1587

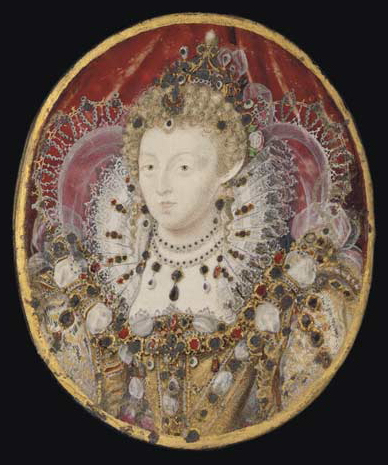
1595-1600

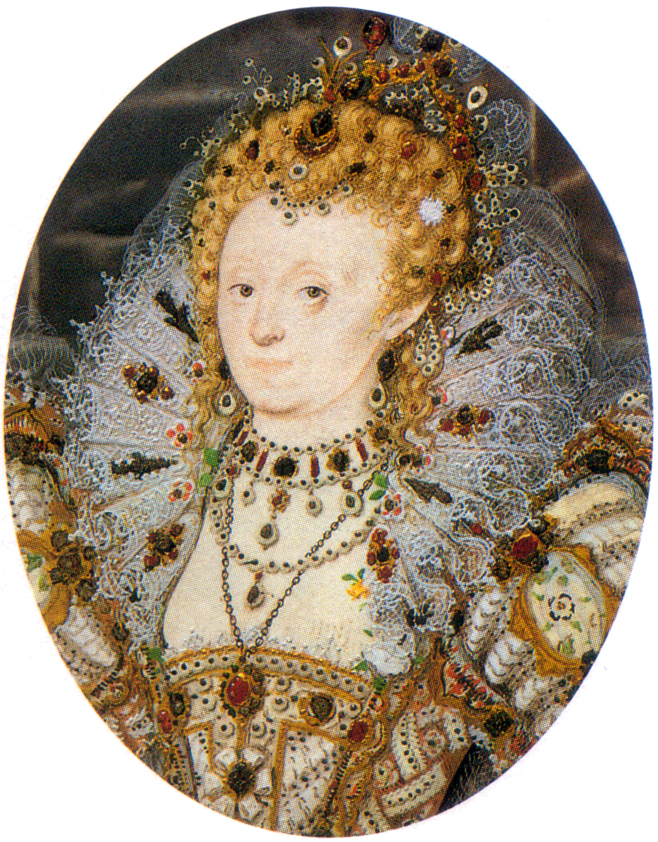
1595-1600

=== Drawing and illumination ===
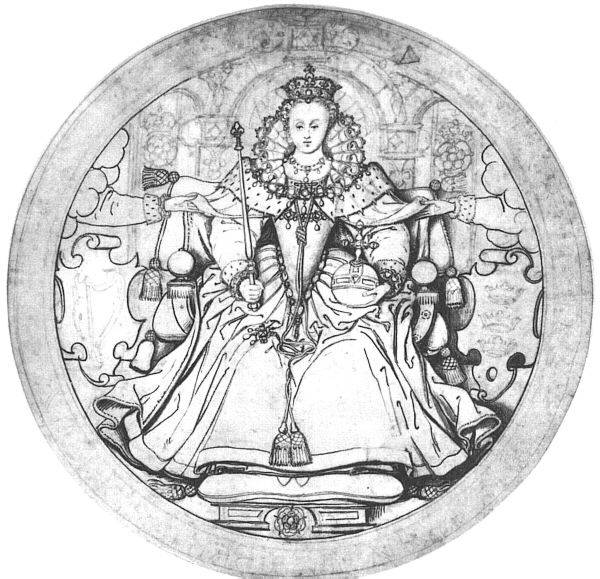
Design for the obverse of a Great Seal of Ireland (never made) c. 1584. Hilliard drawings are rare.

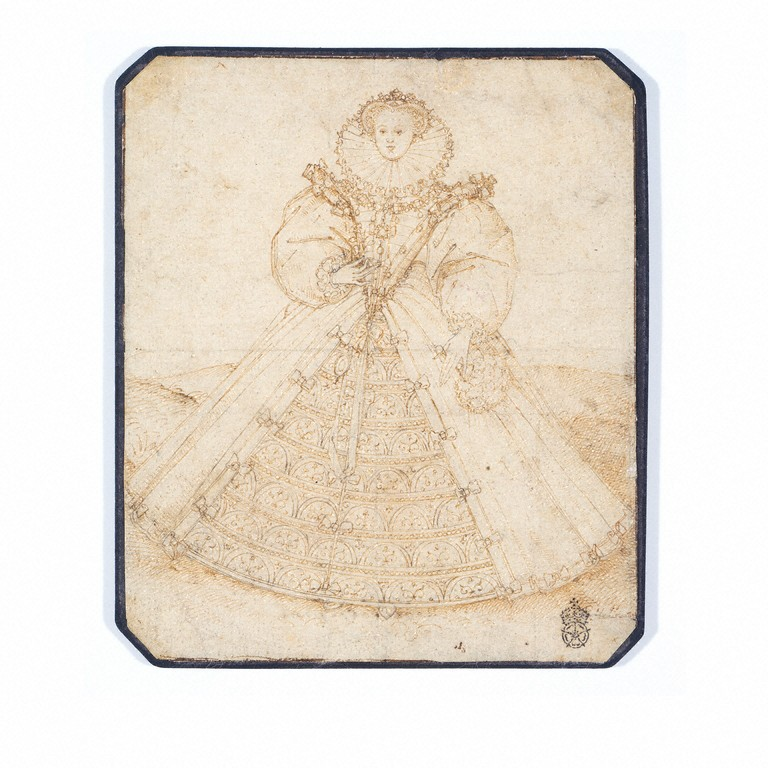
Probably one of the alternative designs Elizabeth requested for her new Great Seal of England in 1584 - another version was chosen. V&A.

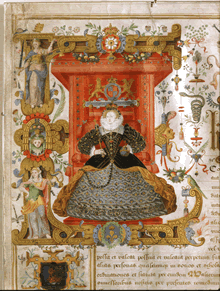
Charter of Emmanuel College, Cambridge

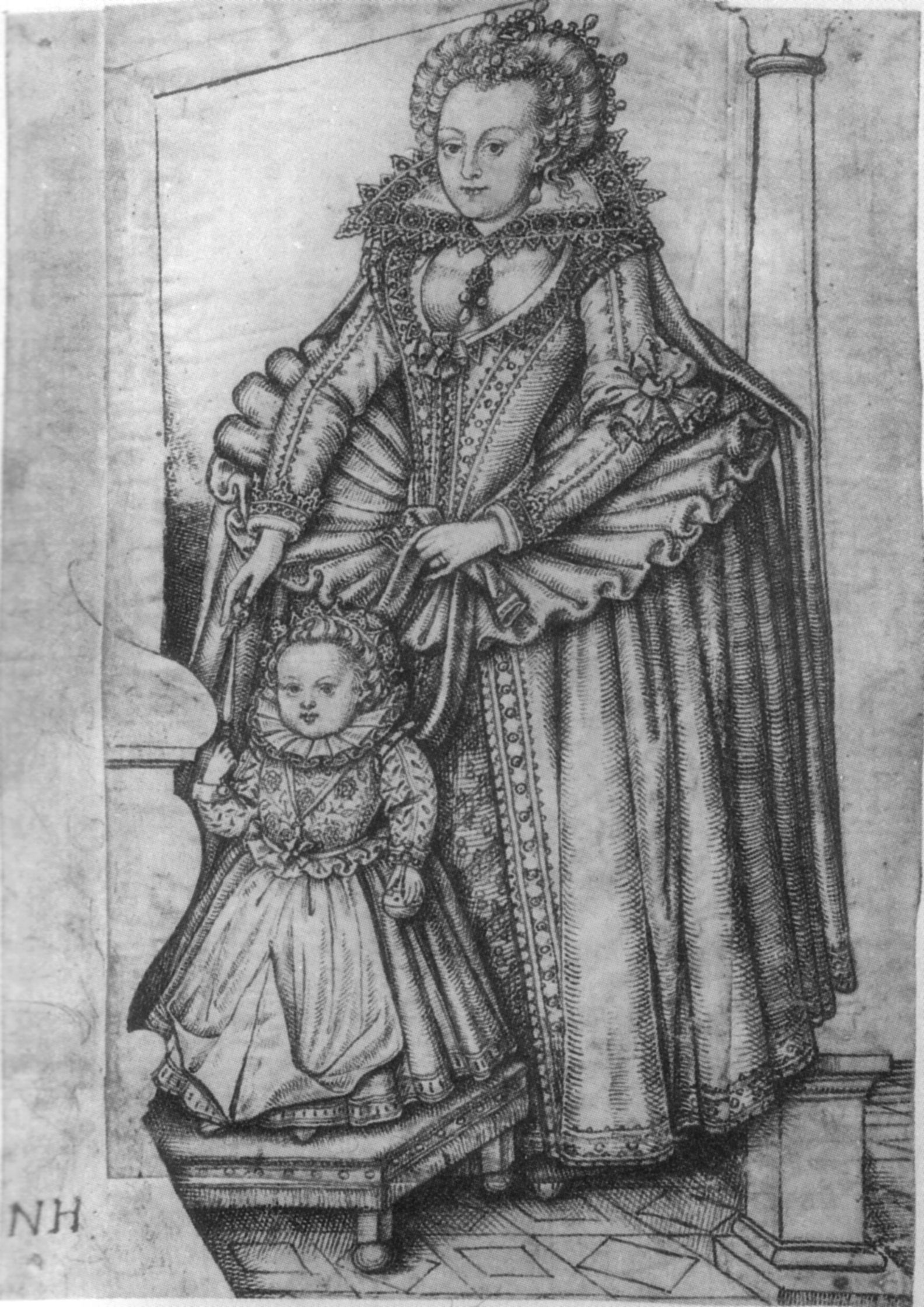
Drawing of Elizabeth Stuart, Electress Palatine, and her son Frederick Henry, probably for an engraving

== See also ==
- Artists of the Tudor court
- List of British artists
- Portraiture of Elizabeth I
- Portrait of Sir Francis Drake wearing the Drake Pendant, 1591
