= Sheriff of Exeter =

The Sheriff of Exeter was an official of Exeter, Devon, and as sheriff was responsible for keeping the King's peace (pax regis) within the city. The position was granted when Henry VIII conferred county status on the city in 1537, and the position continued until abolished in 1974 by the Courts Act 1971 and Local Government Act 1972. During the existence of the position, 436 Sheriffs served.

== History ==
The right to a sheriff was conferred along with county status to Exeter in 1537 by Henry VIII, previously having fallen under the Sheriff of Devon.

== Duties ==
The sheriff was responsible for law enforcement, including the policing of the city, arranging for court assizes sessions to be held, and to attend the hanging of condemned prisoners.

Following the passage of the Courts Act 1971, the judicial functions of the office were removed, making the position purely ceremonial, but this was short lived with the Local Government Act 1972 removing the ceremonial role as well.

== Notable sheriffs ==
A number of people were also either Mayor of Exeter or Member of Parliament for Exeter having held the position of sheriff.

Notable sheriffs include (with year of election as Sheriff in brackets):

- Sir Walter de Sweynthill (1330–1332)
- John Tuckfield (1547) - mayor
- Edward Bridgeman (1563)
- Nicholas Hilliard (1568)
- John Peryam (1582) - mayor and MP
- George Smith (1583) - mayor and MP
- Ignatius Jordain (1611) - mayor and MP
- Thomas Blackall (1862)
- Robert Pople (1890) - mayor
- Rowland Glave Saunders (1935) - mayor
- John Geoffrey Rowe Orchard (1937) - mayor
