= John Bridgeman (bishop) =

English Anglican bishop (1577–1652)

The Right Reverend John Bridgeman
- Bishop of Chester
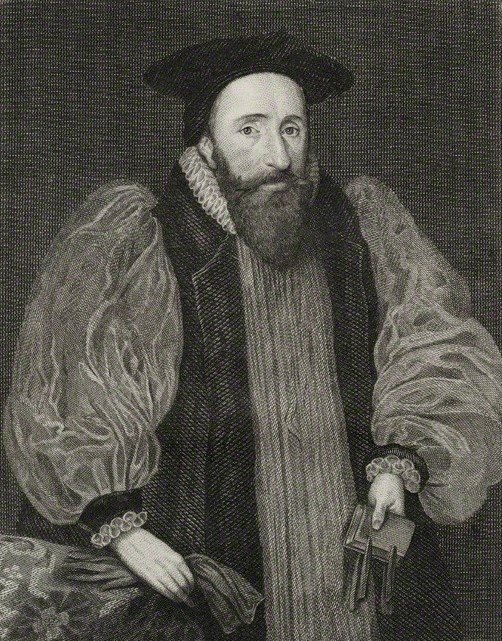
- Diocese: Diocese of Chester
- In office: 1619–1646 (abolition of episcopacy)
- Predecessor: Thomas Morton
- Successor: Brian Walton

Personal details
- Born: 2 November 1577 Exeter
- Died: 11 November 1652 (aged 75) Morton, Shropshire
- Buried: Kinnerley, Shropshire
- Denomination: Anglican
- Spouse: Elizabeth Helyar (m.1606)
- Education: Magdalene College, Cambridge

John Bridgeman (2 November 1577 – 11 November 1652) was an English Anglican clergyman.

Born in Exeter, he was the eldest son of Thomas Bridgeman and grandson of Edward Bridgeman. He was educated at Magdalene College, Cambridge, where he graduated with a Master of Arts, and then at the University of Oxford, receiving there a Doctor of Divinity. Bridgeman became rector of Wigan in 1615 and also of Bangor in 1621. Two years before, he had been consecrated Bishop of Chester, a post he held until the abolition of episcopacy in 1646. In 1633 Bridgeman was subject to a royal commission of enquiry led by Thomas Canon following complaints to the privy council that Bridgeman had embezzled fines taken for commuting penances. During his tenure, he initialised suspensions against the puritans Thomas Paget, John Angier and Samuel Eaton. He was deprived of his See by Parliament on 9 October 1646, as episcopacy was abolished for the duration of the Commonwealth and the Protectorate.

On 29 April 1606, he married Elizabeth Helyar, daughter of Reverend William Helyar, and had by her five sons. Bridgeman died at Moreton, Shropshire, and was buried at Kinnerley. His oldest son Orlando was a judge and baronet and his third son Henry Bridgeman a bishop.

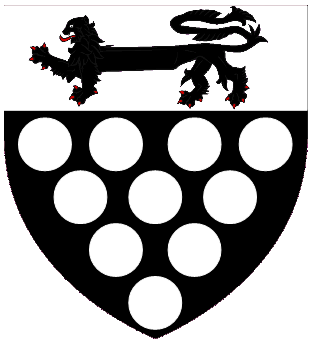
Arms: Sable ten plates in pile on a chief Argent a lion passant also Sable.

Church of England titles
Preceded by Thomas Morton	Bishop of Chester; 1619–1646	Vacant Commonwealth abolition of episcopacy Title next held by Brian Walton
