= John Tuckfield =

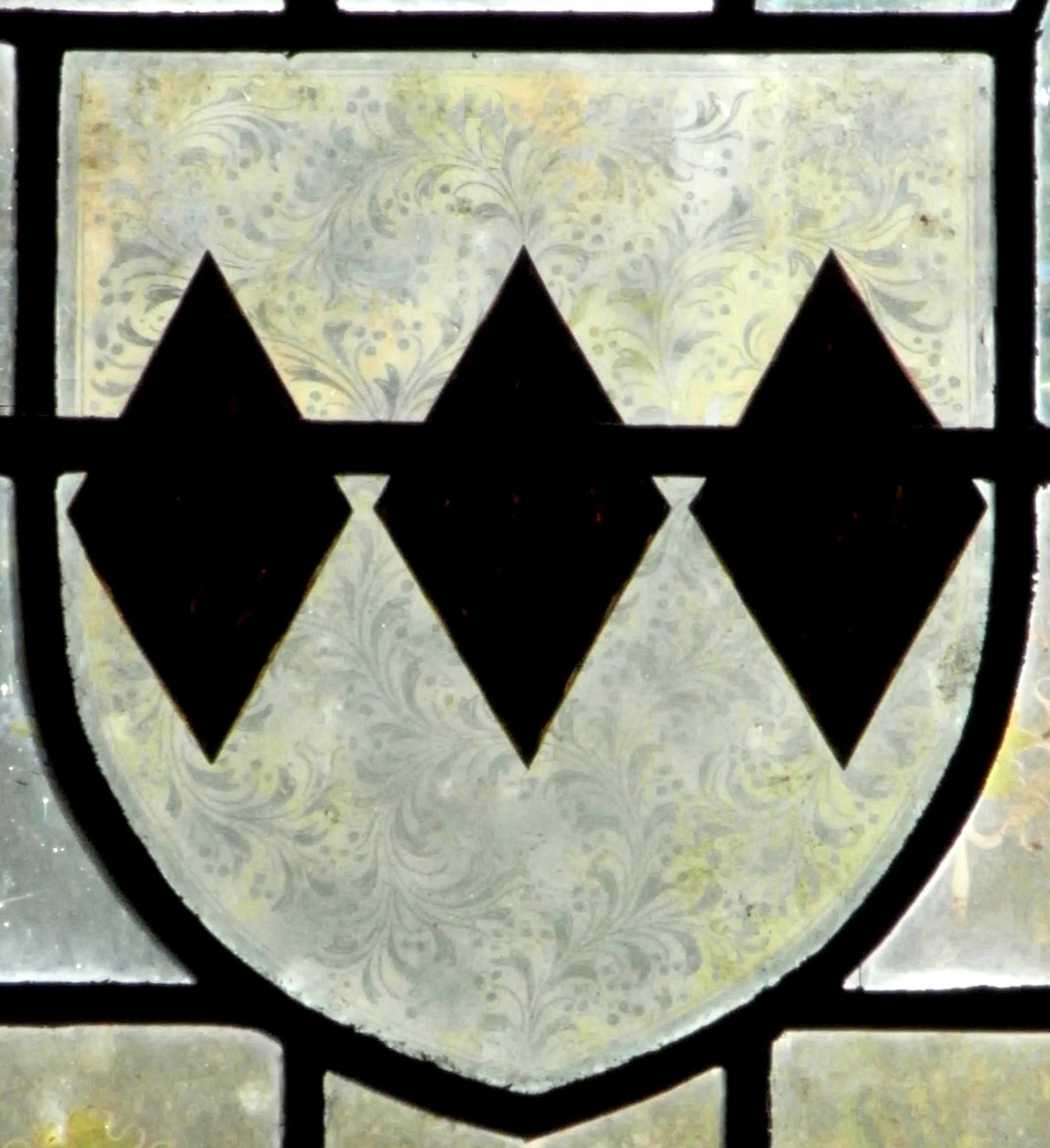
Arms of Tuckfield: Argent, three lozenges in fess sable. Detail from 19th century heraldic stained-glass window in Holy Cross Church, Crediton

John Tuckfield (fl. 1550) of the City of Exeter, Devon, was a merchant, Alderman of Exeter, and member of the Company of Merchant Adventurers of Exeter who was Sheriff of Exeter in 1547 and Mayor of Exeter in 1549–1550.

== Marriage ==
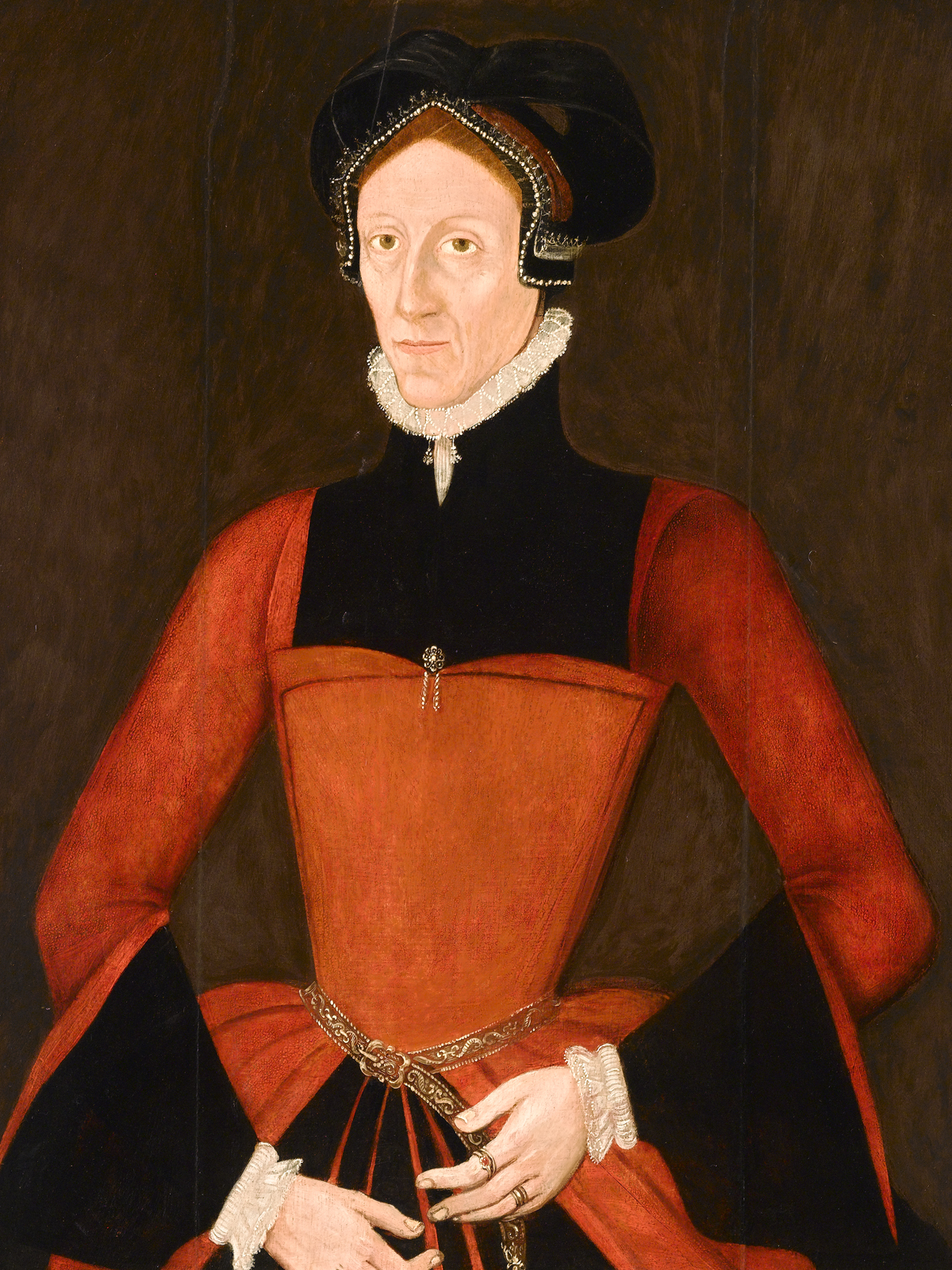
Joan Tuckfield (1506–1573), wife of John Tuckfield, Mayor of Exeter in 1549–1550. 1573 portrait, British (English) School. Collection of Royal Albert Memorial Museum, Exeter, transferred from the collection of Exeter Guildhall in 1971

He married a certain Joan (1506–1573), whose portrait survives in the collection of the Royal Albert Memorial Museum in Exeter as one of that museum's earliest paintings. Based on her will, dated 14 June 1568, it was discovered that she had left substantial bequests for charitable purposes.

She also "inclosed" Ringwell, Exeter, a place for the execution and burial of traitors and other criminals, as the following text inscribed on a stone tablet on the site was recorded in 1635:

"5^{to} Marcii 1557. This place was bless'd by the Lord Bishop, given by Mr John Peter, then Mayor, inclos'd by the honest matron Joan Tuckfield, whose soule Lorde pardon". The inscription was transcribed slightly differently in 1828 by Oliver & Jones.

== Progeny ==
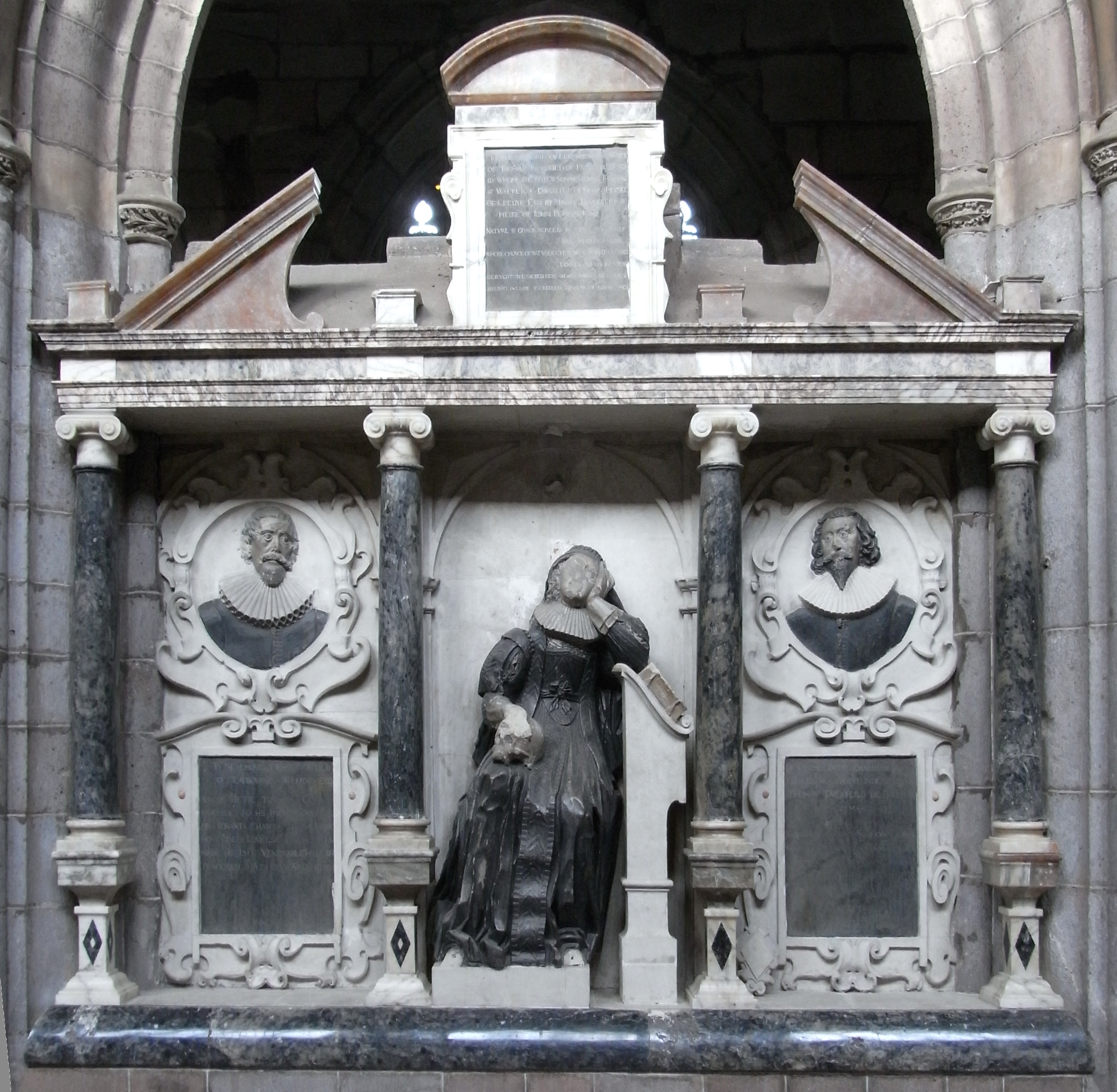
Tuckfield Monument in Crediton Church

Many have stated that his son and heir was John Tuckfield (1555–1630) of Tedburn St Mary and Little Fulford in the parish of Shobrooke, near Crediton, Devon. However the only evidence of progeny is the record of two daughters: Katherine, widow of Rykard and wife of William Waye; and apparently another daughter, also Katherine wife of John Robyns. John Tuckfield (1555–1630) of Tedburn St Mary, later of Little Fulford, was the son of John Tuckfield (c. 1530–1586/89) of Crediton, himself the son of William Tuckfield clothier of Crediton (d. c. 1565) and his wife Joan daughter of John Kene of Upton Hellions. John's sculpted bust survives on the left-hand side of the "Tuckfield Monument" erected by his son Thomas in the chancel of Holy Cross Church, Crediton. A black stone tablet below is inscribed:

To the memorie of John Tuckfeild of Teadbourne & Fullford, Esq., whose pietie towards God, fidelitie to his friends, bounty to his tenants, charitie to the poore, honestie & courtesie to all men made his lyfe venerable, his death peaceable. Aeta LXXV A^{o} D^{o} 1630".

He purchased the estate of Little Fulford from the daughters and co-heiresses of Sir William Peryam (1534-1604), Lord Chief Baron of the Exchequer, and in 1630 purchased the advowson of Morchard Bishop for his younger son Walter Tuckfield (d.1639), whom he appointed as rector.
