= Sir Walter de Sweynthill =

Sir Walter de Sweynthill (died c. 1340) was an English knight and politician in the reigns of Edward II and Edward III who represented the City of Exeter and Devonshire in Parliament and served as Sheriff of Exeter from 1330 to 1332.

== Life ==
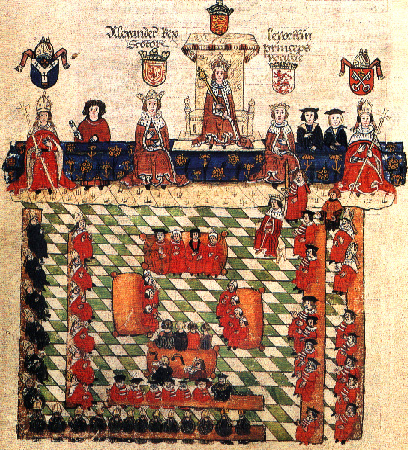
The Parliament of Edward II

As with many notable individuals of the Dark Ages, there is no reliable record of his date of birth but he is recorded as the highest tax payer in the parish of Awliscombe, where he held property.

de Sweynthill represented the City of Exeter in the Parliament of 1327 and the county of Devon in the first eight parliaments of Edward III.
