= James Agar, 3rd Earl of Normanton =

James Charles Herbert Welbore Ellis Agar, 3rd Earl of Normanton DL (17 September 1818 – 19 December 1896), styled Viscount Somerton from birth until 1868, was a Conservative and later Peelite member of parliament in the United Kingdom of Great Britain and Ireland before inheriting an Irish earldom and large estates in Ireland and Hampshire. In 1873 he was created a baron in the peerage of the United Kingdom, giving him a seat in the House of Lords.

== Life ==
Born in 1818 at Ditchley House, Oxfordshire, he was the eldest son of Welbore Ellis Agar, 2nd Earl of Normanton, and Lady Diana Herbert, a daughter of George Herbert, 11th Earl of Pembroke. He was educated at Trinity College, Cambridge, where he was president of the University Pitt Club.

At an unopposed by-election in 1841, he was elected as Member of Parliament for Wilton, a constituency where the Earls of Pembroke had great influence, and was re-elected unopposed as a Peelite at the general election of 1847. He stood down from the House of Commons at the election of 1852.

In 1851 he was commissioned as a lieutenant into the Wiltshire Yeomanry.

In 1868, he succeeded his father as Earl of Normanton. As well as his country house in Hampshire, Somerley, he had a town house at 3, Seamore Place, St George Hanover Square, Westminster. Both had belonged to the 2nd Earl of Normanton in 1830.

As an Irish peer, Normanton did not have a seat in the House of Lords, unless elected as an Irish representative peer, which he never was. However, in 1873 he was created Baron Somerton of Somerley, in the peerage of the United Kingdom, giving him a seat in the Lords which would be inherited by his successors.

== Children ==
In 1856 Normanton married Caroline Susan Augusta Barrington, a daughter of William Barrington, 6th Viscount Barrington, and they had many children, including:

- Caroline Elizabeth (21 Mar 1857 - 9 May 1894), who married Edward Villiers, 5th Earl of Clarendon. They had one son and one daughter.
- Lt. Charles George Welbore Ellis Agar, Viscount Somerton (27 Apr 1858 - 17 Jan 1894). Died unmarried.
- Lady Mary Beatrice (10 Aug 1859 - 20 Dec 1943). Died unmarried
- Lady Margaret Elizabeth Diana (10 Dec 1863 - 29 Mar 1941) married Hon. Ivan Campbell, son of John Alexander Gavin Campbell, 6th Earl of Breadalbane and Holland, and brother of Gavin Campbell, 1st Marquess of Breadalbane. They had one son, Iain.
- Sidney James Agar, 4th Earl of Normanton (9 Apr 1865 - 25 Nov 1933) married Lady Amy Frederica Alice Byng, daughter of Henry Byng, 4th Earl of Strafford and Countess Henrietta Danneskjold-Samsöe (daughter of Christian Conrad Sophus Danneskiold-Samsøe (1800-1886)). They had one son and seven daughters.
- Lady Mary Adelaide (18 Aug 1869 - 7 June 1921) married Henry St. George Foley, son of Gen. Sir St. George Foley. They had one son, Gerald and one daughter, Mildred.
- Hon. Henry Augustus Bernard (21 Nov 1870 - 25 Apr 1885). Died unmarried.
- Hon. Francis William Arthur (19 Oct 1873 - 18 Aug 1936) married Laura Astley Kennard, daughter of Henry Steinmetz Kennard. They had one son and one daughter.

Parliament of the United Kingdom
Preceded by Viscount FitzHarris	Member of Parliament for Wilton; 1841 – 1852	Succeeded by Charles A'Court
Peerage of Ireland
Preceded by Welbore Agar	Earl of Normanton; 1868–1896	Succeeded by Sidney James Agar
Peerage of the United Kingdom
New creation	Baron Somerton; 1873–1896	Succeeded by Sidney James Agar
