= Lanhydrock House =

Country house in Lanhydrock, Cornwall, England

- Lannhydrek (Cornish)
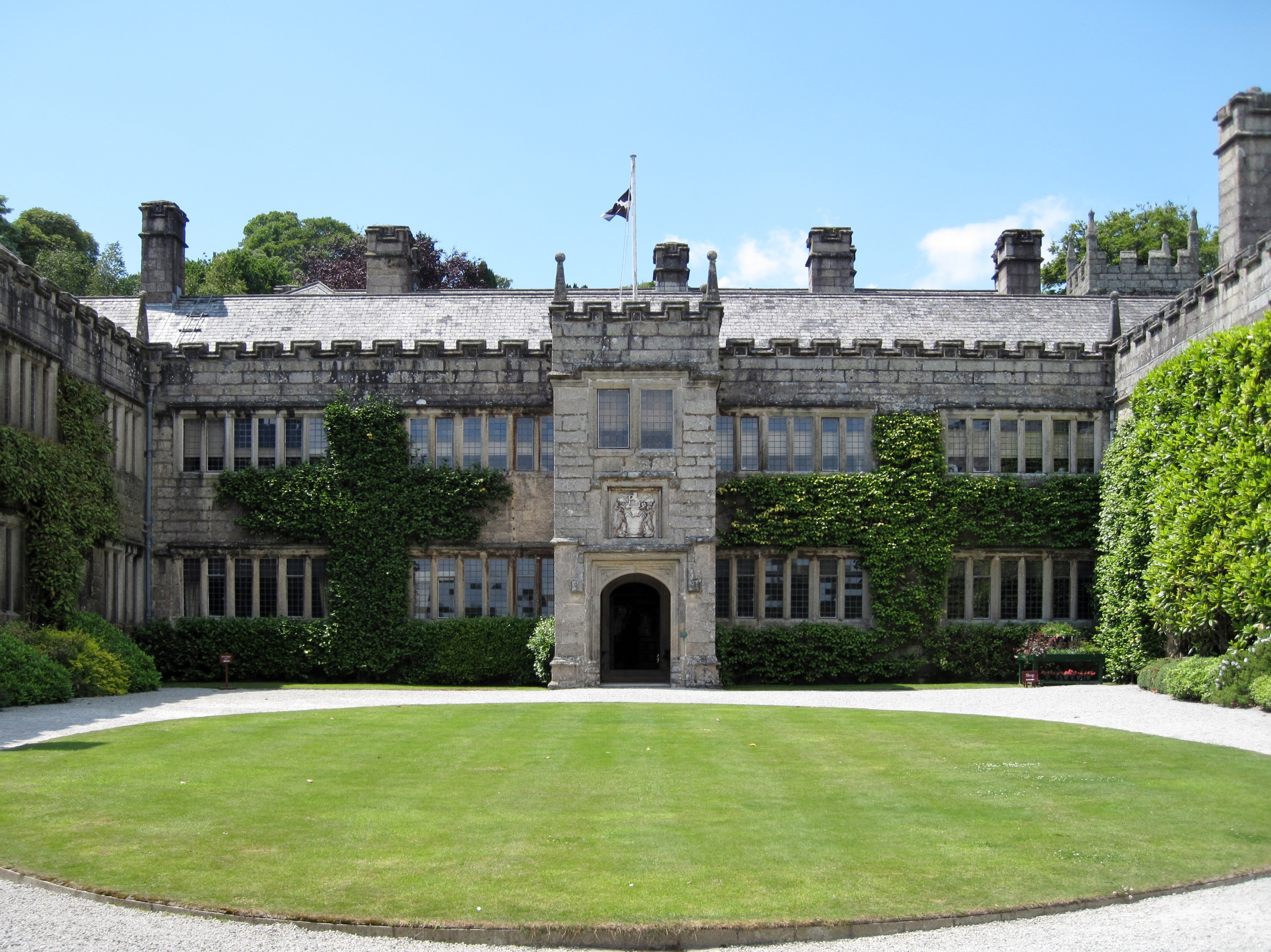

- Location within Cornwall
- 50.441°N 4.698°W
- Location: Lanhydrock, Cornwall, England

History
- Built: 1881–1882

Site notes
- Architect: Sir George Gilbert Scott
- Owner: National Trust

Listed Building – Grade I
- Official name: Lanhydrock House
- Designated: 25 October 1951
- Reference no.: 1157870

National Register of Historic Parks and Gardens
- Official name: Lanhydrock
- Designated: 11 June 1987
- Reference no.: 1000449

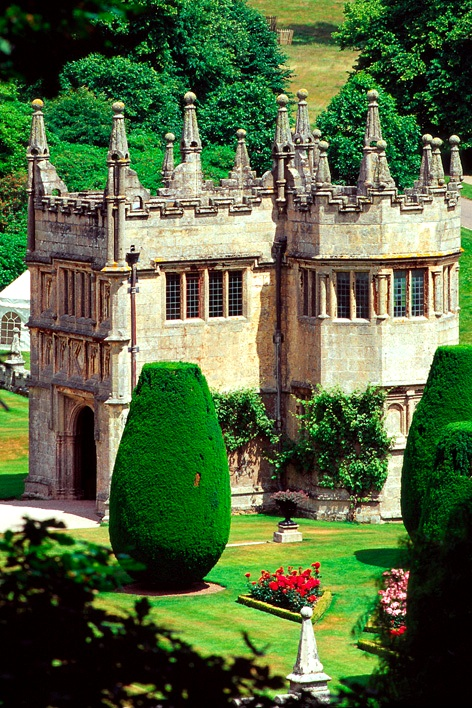
The gatehouse

Lanhydrock House, commonly known simply as Lanhydrock (Cornish: Lannhydrek), is a country house and estate in the parish of Lanhydrock, Cornwall, England.

The house stands in extensive grounds of 890 acres (360 ha) above the River Fowey, and has been owned and managed by the National Trust since 1953. The house dates from the 1620s, however most of the interiors were reconstructed after a fire in 1881; a new service wing was built at the same time. It is a Grade I listed building and is set in gardens with formal areas. The hill behind the house is planted with a fine selection of shrubs and trees.

The parish church is dedicated to St Hydroc and stands in the grounds of Lanhydrock House. Parts date back to the late 15th century and the church has a chancel, nave, north and south aisles and three-stage battlemented tower with nine bells. Eight bells date from the late 19th century and are regularly rung. The ninth bell dates from circa 1599 and is only rung infrequently for tolling.

== Early history ==
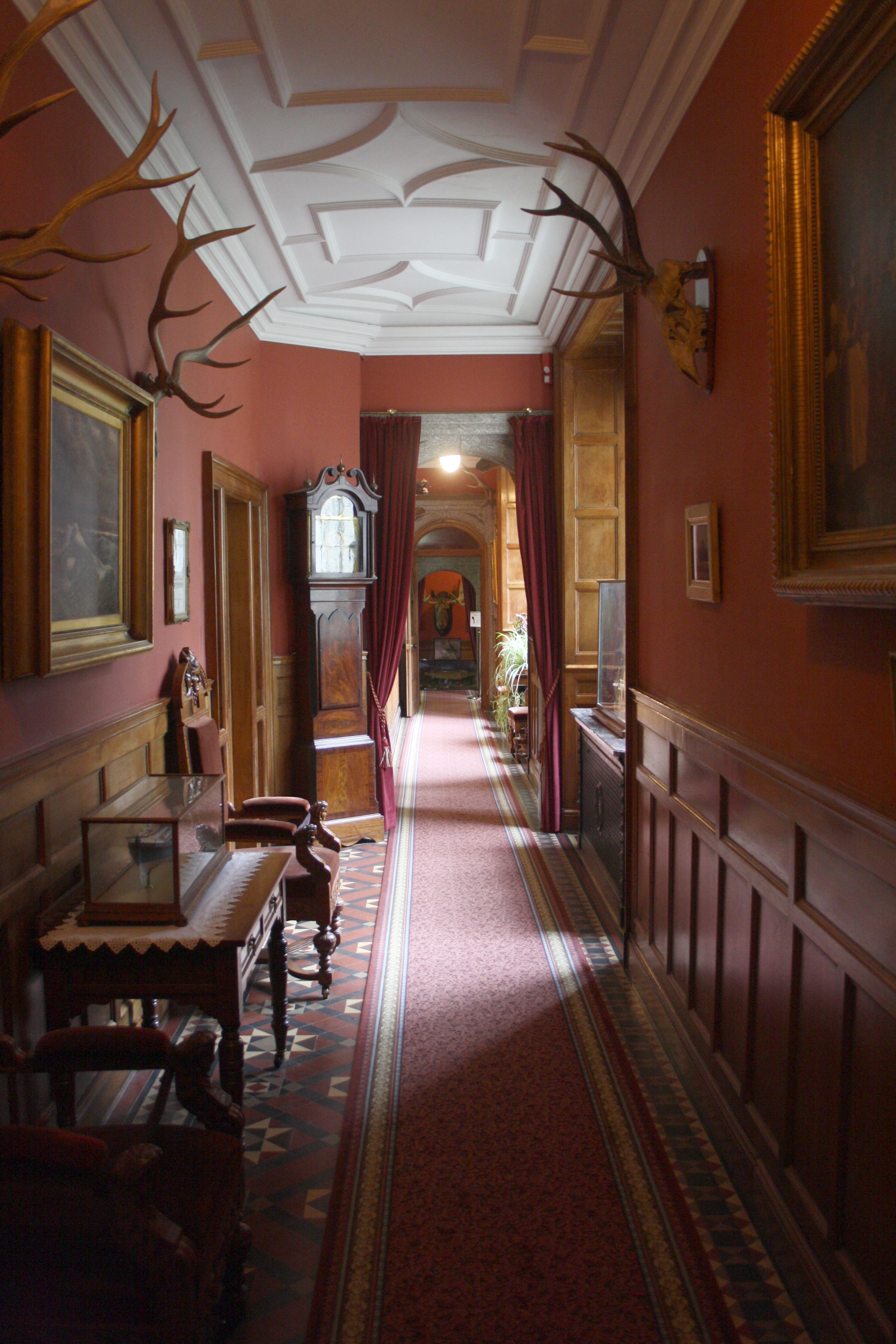
A corridor within the property

Lanhydrock estate belonged to the Augustinian priory of St Petroc at Bodmin but the Dissolution of the Monasteries during the 1530s saw it pass into private hands. In 1620 wealthy merchant Sir Richard Robartes, of Truro, acquired the estate and began building Lanhydrock House, designed to a four-sided layout around a central courtyard and constructed of grey granite. Robartes died in 1624 but work on the building was continued by his son John Robartes, 1st Earl of Radnor, a notable public figure who served as Lord Privy Seal and Lord President of the Council. The embattled walls were built of rude (rough), massive granite blocks with years 1636 and 1642 on the walls, indicating when they were built. A barbican gate was added and the house was garrisoned by Parliamentary forces in August 1644 when Sir Richard Grenville, 1st Baronet took possession.

== Agar-Robartes ==
Most of the current building dates from late Victorian times, when the estate came under the ownership of the Agar-Robartes family.

Henry Robartes, 3rd Earl of Radnor (c. 1695–1741), was succeeded as Earl of Radnor by a cousin, but decided to separate the estate from the peerages by leaving it to a son of his sister Mary. By the late 18th century it had passed to Anna Maria Hunt (1771–1861) of Mayfair, London, the great-niece of the third Earl. In 1804 she married Charles Bagenal Agar, the youngest son of Irish peer James Agar, 1st Viscount Clifden. The couple had three children, but by 1818 not only had her husband died, but also her eldest and youngest sons. Resultantly, over the next fifty years of widowhood, although mainly an absentee landlord – she preferred the social life of London – she was known to be a conscientious, benevolent, and charitable landlord and employer, who greatly improved the estate. On the death of his mother in 1822, her surviving middle son Thomas Agar took up residence at Lanhydrock and adopted the Robartes name by royal warrant. Agar-Robartes was returned to Parliament for Cornwall East in 1847, a seat he held until 1868. In 1869 the barony of Robartes held by his mother's ancestors was revived when he was raised to the peerage as Baron Robartes of Lanhydrock and of Truro in the County of Cornwall. By 1872 Lord Robartes of Lanhydrock was listed among the top ten landowners in Cornwall, with estates of 22,234 acres (8,998 ha) or 2.93% of Cornwall.

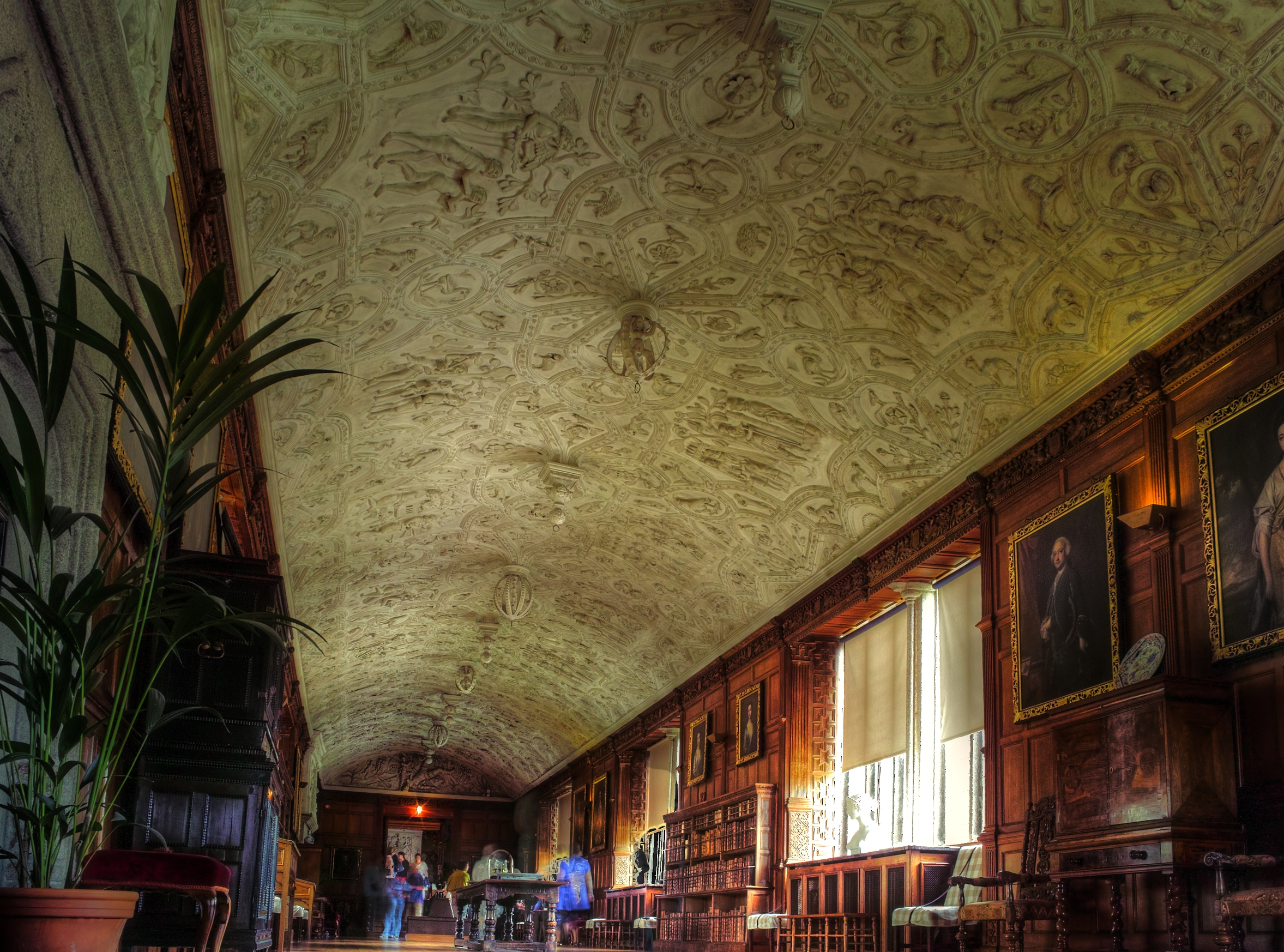
The Long Gallery

Agar-Robartes had the east wing of the house demolished, leaving the U-shaped plan seen today. In 1880 he commissioned the architect George Gilbert Scott to renovate Lanhydrock House. On 4 April 1881 a major fire destroyed the south wing and caused extensive damage to the central section. The fire started in the kitchen, and a near gale-force wind fanned the flames along the south wing and the ″communicating block″. Of the main house only the north wing, with its 116 feet (35 m) Long Gallery, and the front porch building survived intact, along with the original gatehouse, which dates from the mid-17th century. The gallery was decorated with old plaster work which was considered to be the finest of its type in the west of England with figures representing the creation in ″bas-relief″. The property was insured for £10,000 in the Royal Standard Office and for £10,000 in the County Fire Office, and the damage is estimated to have cost £8,000 to £10,000 It was reported in August 1881 that the rebuilding of the house would cost £50,000 and was to be undertaken by Messers Lang and Son of Liskeard. New sections were built behind the south wing, including a kitchen block, in the style of the original building – which was unusual at the time. Agar-Robartes’s wife died five days after the fire of smoke inhalation, and he died twelve months later, reported to be of a broken heart.

Their only son, Thomas Charles Agar-Robartes, inherited the estate. Having been called to the Bar in 1870, in 1880 Agar-Robartes was returned to Parliament as one of two representatives for Cornwall East. He appointed a local architect, Richard Coad – who had worked as an assistant to George Gilbert Scott – to design and supervise the construction of a high-Victorian house from the previous adaptions of the Jacobean house his father had planned. After renovations on the house were completed, Agar-Robartes moved his family there about 1885. Agar-Robartes entered the House of Lords on the death of his father in 1882, and on 10 September 1899 succeeded his kinsman as Viscount Clifden. In 1891, as chairman of the Agar-Robartes Bank, he took over the ownership of Wimpole Hall, the largest house in Cambridgeshire. Moving his family home there, he later served as Lord-Lieutenant of Cambridgeshire from 1906 to 1915.

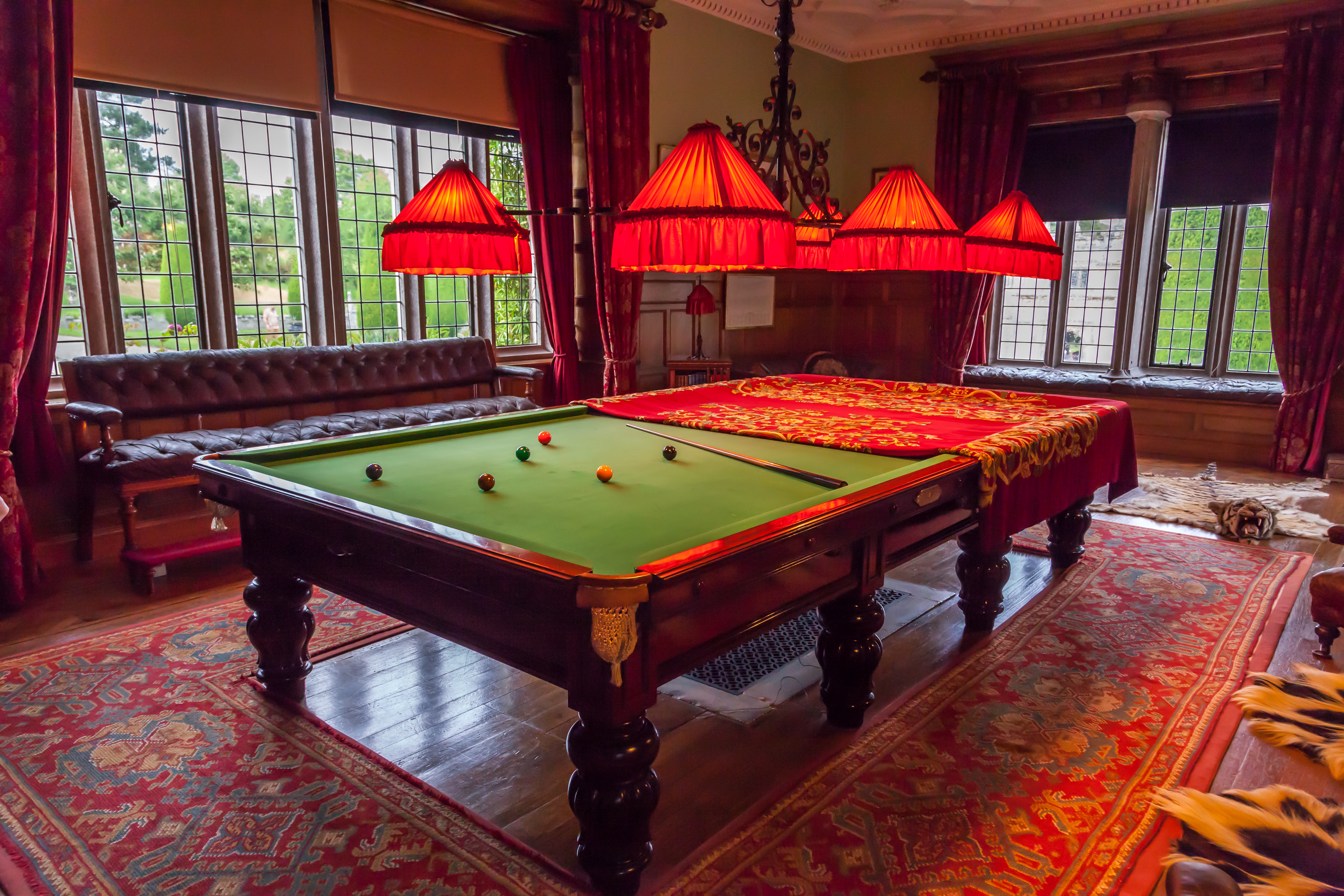
Lanhydrock House – Billiard Room 2014

The Robartes family suffered great losses during the First World War, including the heir Thomas Agar-Robartes, who was killed during the Battle of Loos in France, while trying to rescue a colleague from no-man's land. As Agar-Robartes was unmarried, his younger brother Francis later succeeded their father.

In 1951 the house was designated a Grade I listed building.

== Antiquities ==
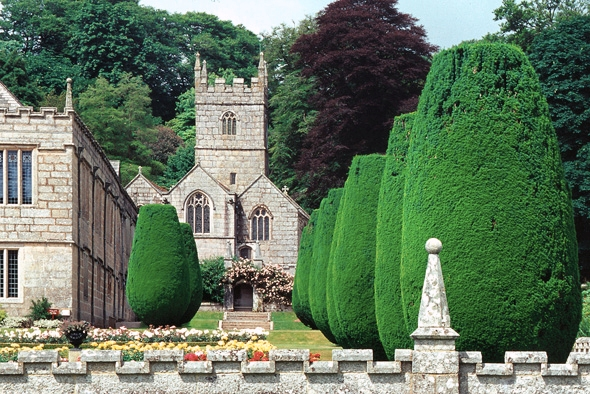
Lanhydrock Church

The parish church is dedicated to St Hydroc and stands in the grounds of Lanhydrock House. Parts date back to the late 15th century and the church has a chancel, nave, north and south aisles and three-stage battlemented tower with nine bells. Eight bells date from the late 19th century and are regularly rung. The ninth bell dates from circa 1599 and is only rung infrequently for tolling.

Arthur Langdon (1896) recorded two Cornish crosses and two cross bases (at Tredinnick Cross and Reperry) in the parish. One cross is in the churchyard and the other is half a cross head at Treffry. The cross in the churchyard is ornamented on all four sides of the shaft. In addition to these there is a cross called Bodwen Cross; this cross was recorded in 1850 but was not mentioned by J. T. Blight or Arthur Langdon. It was found again in 1937 near Helman Tor in the parish of Lanlivery. It was taken from there and erected in the new cemetery at Lanhydrock. A request for it to be returned to Lanlivery to a site on the Saints' Way was refused.

== Lanhydrock Estate Company ==
the medieval Bodwen Cross. (in the cemetery)

In 1934, to manage income taxes and death duties, the entire Cornish landholdings of the Agar-Robartes family were incorporated into the Lanhydrock Estate Company. In 1953, faced with crippling death duties through a lack of his own children, the 7th Viscount Clifden gave the house and approximately 160 hectares (400 acres) of parkland to the National Trust. This allowed the preservation of the house and its extensive Victorian collections, and, by agreement with the Inland Revenue, payment in kind of death duties, allowing the residual Lanhydrock Estate Company to pass into the hands of the wider family.

On the death of the 7th Viscount, the titles and control of the company passed to his youngest brother Arthur Agar-Robartes, 8th Viscount Clifden. Lord Clifden died in December 1974, and in a similar death duty exchange with HM Revenue, added 298 acres (121 ha) during the 1970s to the National Trust's estate holdings. He had married Patience Mary Basset in 1920 but died without male issue, and upon his death all his titles, with the exception of the barony of Mendip (which the 6th Earl of Normanton succeeded) became extinct. His daughter Rachel married Captain Cromwell Lloyd-Davies in 1941, and they had a daughter Ann Lloyd-Davies (1942–2016). In 1964 she married Colin Williams; they and their three children now control the company.

As of 2020 the company owns and controls 2,500 acres (1,000 ha) of land, and is by descent controlled by the Williams family.

== House and gardens today ==
Today, the public tour of Lanhydrock house is one of the longest of any National Trust house. It takes in the service rooms, nurseries and some servants' bedrooms, as well as the main reception rooms and family bedrooms. In 2004 it was one of the Trust's ten most visited paid-entry properties, with over 200,000 visitors.

Parts of the estate have been designated as an Important Plant Area, by the organisation Plantlife, for its ancient woodland and lichens. The hill behind the house is planted with a fine selection of shrubs and trees.

Lanhydrock was the main setting for the 1996 film version of Twelfth Night directed by Trevor Nunn, and starring Helena Bonham Carter as Olivia. On 12 June 2008 Lanhydrock hosted an episode of BBC TV's Antiques Roadshow, which was first aired on 12 October 2008 (part 1) and 30 November 2008 (part 2).

From 2024 the Jacobean plasterwork ceiling in the Long Gallery, one of the few parts of the house that survived the 1881 fire, was the subject of a conservation project to clean and restore it. In June 2025 the restoration featured in an episode of BBC's series Hidden Treasures of the National Trust.
