= Welbore Agar, 2nd Earl of Normanton =

Irish peer and landowner

Welbore Ellis Agar, 2nd Earl of Normanton (12 November 1778 — 26 August 1868) was an Irish peer and landowner, of Anglo-Irish origins, who spent most of his life in England, where he acquired the Somerley estate in 1825.

His father was Charles Agar, Bishop of Cloyne, who was later created Earl of Normanton in the peerage of Ireland and ended his career as Archbishop of Dublin. His father was the third son of Henry Agar of Gowran Castle, County Kilkenny and his wife Anne Ellis, a daughter of Welbore Ellis, Bishop of Meath. His mother was Jane Benson, daughter of William Benson, of Downpatrick, County Down.

Agar may have been named for a prosperous uncle, Welbore Ellis Agar, who at the time of his birth had been married for some nine years but had no children.

On 14 July 1809, Agar succeeded his father as Earl of Normanton, Viscount Somerton, and Baron Somerton in the peerage of Ireland.

On 17 May 1816, Normanton married Lady Diana Herbert, a daughter of George Herbert, 11th Earl of Pembroke, and Elizabeth Beauclerk, whose father was Topham Beauclerk, a grandson of Charles Beauclerk, 1st Duke of St Albans, one of the illegitimate sons of King Charles II. They had at least four children:

- James Charles Herbert Welbore Ellis Agar, 3rd Earl of Normanton (1818–1896)
- Lady Mary Jane Diana Agar (1822–1904), who on 28 July 1845 married Horatio Nelson, 3rd Earl Nelson at St George's Church, Hanover Square
- Herbert Welbore Ellis Agar (1823–1901)
- Charles Welbore Herbert Agar (1824–1855), who in March 1844 was commissioned into the 44th Foot

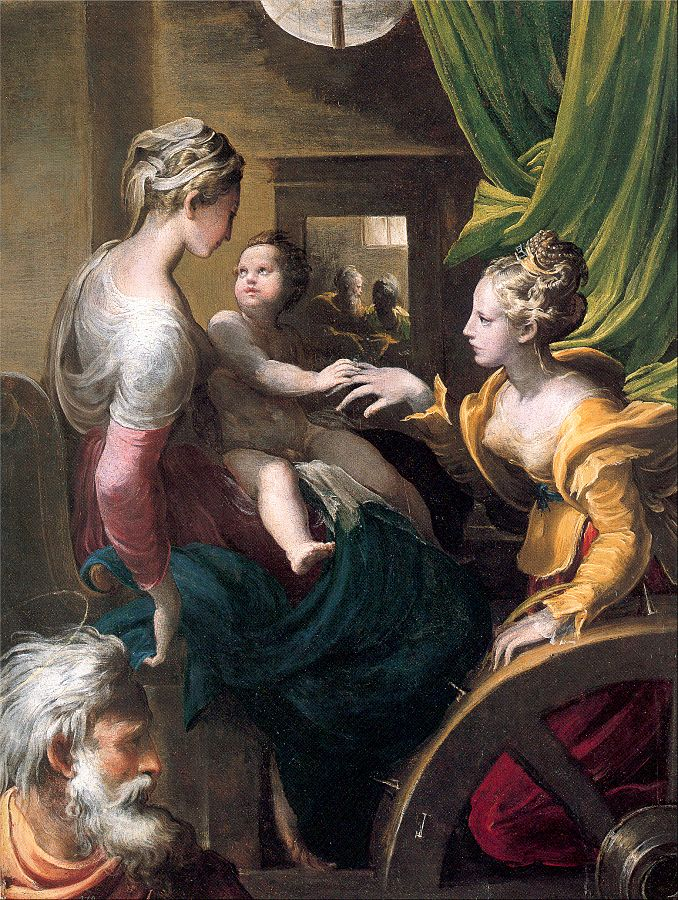
The Mystic Marriage of Saint Catherine, c. 1530

In 1830, as well as Somerley, his country house in Hampshire, Normanton had a town house at 3, Seamore Place, St George Hanover Square, Westminster.

After the death of William Young Ottley in 1836, Normanton bought The Mystic Marriage of Saint Catherine by Parmigianino.

== Notes ==
Peerage of Ireland
Preceded by Charles Agar	Earl of Normanton; 1809–1868	Succeeded by James Agar
