= Mystic Marriage of Saint Catherine (Parmigianino, London) =

Painting by Parmigianino

The Mystic Marriage of St Catherine
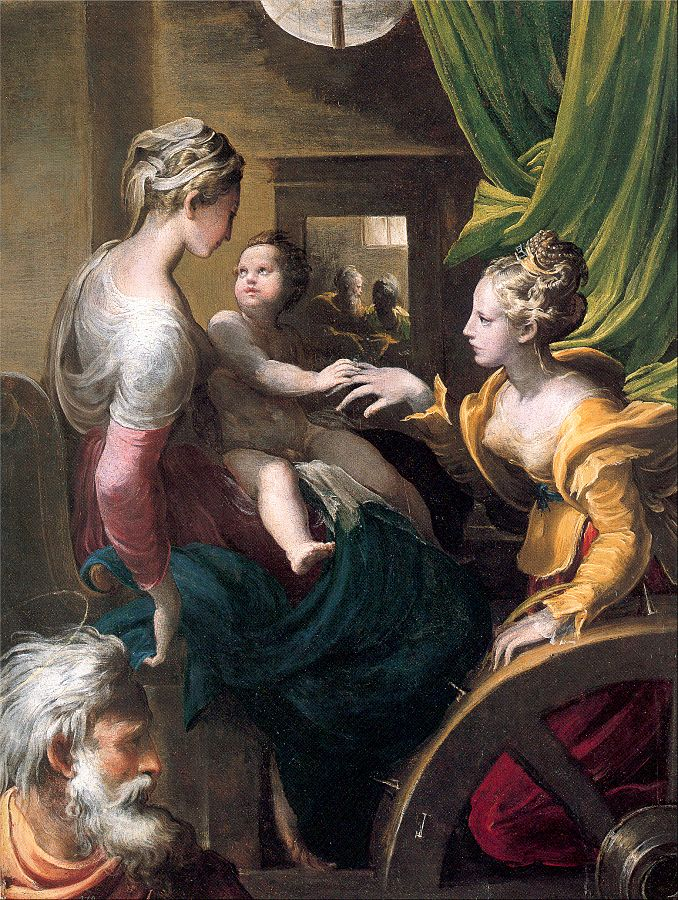
- Artist: Parmigianino
- Year: c.1529
- Medium: oil on panel
- Dimensions: 74.2 cm × 57.2 cm (29.2 in × 22.5 in)
- Location: National Gallery, London

The Mystic Marriage of St Catherine is a c.1529 oil on panel painting of the mystical marriage of Saint Catherine by Parmigianino, now in the National Gallery, London, who acquired it in 1974. It was engraved by Giulio Bonasone.

== Provenance ==
Giorgio Vasari wrote of a "Madonna seen from the side, in a fair pose, with several other figures" made by Parmigianino for a saddler friend of his in Bologna. That work was first linked to the London work in 1784, though some art historians date it a few years earlier during the artist's time in Rome, which ended with the Sack of Rome in 1527. The London work is first recorded in inventories of the Galleria Borghese in 1693 and 1750. In 1800 it was acquired by William Young Ottley, from whom it passed to the Earl of Normanton's collection at Somerley House.

== Copies ==
Several copies of the painting survive – the best are in Apsley House, the Pinacoteca Nazionale di Bologna and the Museo Davia Bargellini. Another copy is still in a private collection – this lacks the oval window at the top but Mario Di Giampaolo argues that it is autograph copy and that the Apsley House work is a copy of it.

== Bibliography ==
- (in Italian) Mario Di Giampaolo ed Elisabetta Fadda, Parmigianino, Keybook, Santarcangelo di Romagna 2002. ISBN 8818-02236-9
