= Viscount Clifden =

British peerage

Viscountcy Clifden
- Quarterly, 1st and 4th: Or, a cross sable charged with five crescents argent (for Ellis) 2nd and 3rd: Azure, a lion rampant or (for Agar)
- Creation date: 12 January 1781
- Created by: George III of Great Britain
- Peerage: Peerage of Ireland
- First holder: James Agar, 1st Baron Clifden
- Last holder: Arthur Agar-Robartes, 8th Viscount Clifden
- Remainder to: Heirs male of the first Viscount's body lawfully begotten
- Subsidiary titles: Baron Clifden; Baron Mendip; Baron Robartes (1899–1974)
- Extinction date: 22 December 1974
- Former seats: Gowran Castle; Holdenby House; Dover House; Lanhydrock House

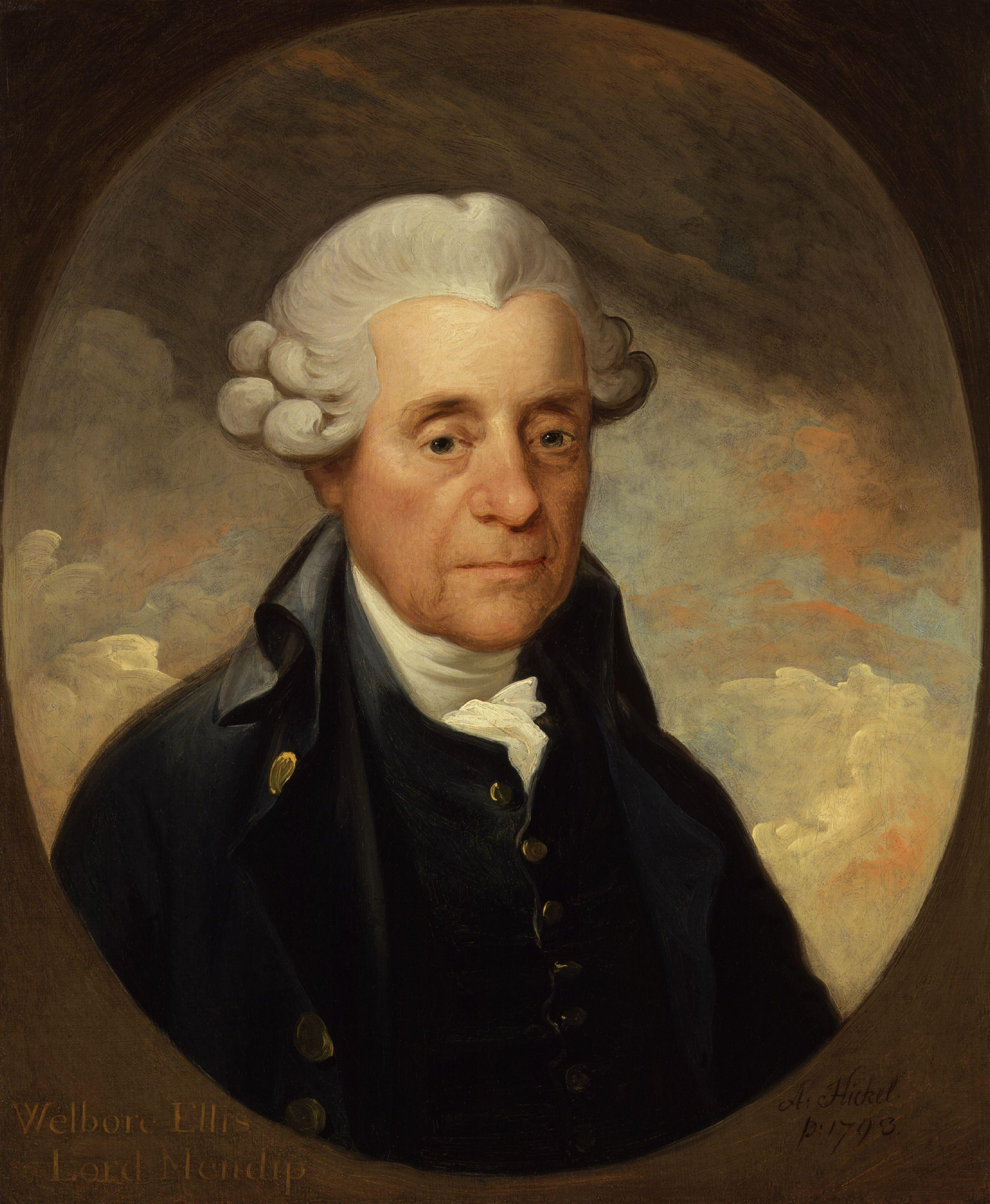
Welbore Ellis, 1st Baron Mendip

Viscount Clifden, of Gowran in the County of Kilkenny, Ireland, was a title in the Peerage of Ireland. It was created on 12 January 1781 for James Agar, 1st Baron Clifden. He had already been created Baron Clifden, of Gowran in the County of Kilkenny, in 1776, also in the Peerage of Ireland. The Viscounts also held the titles of Baron Mendip in the Peerage of Great Britain from 1802 to 1974 (a title which is still extant and now held by the Earl of Normanton) and Baron Dover from 1836 to 1899, when this title became extinct, and Baron Robartes from 1899 to 1974, when this title became extinct, the two latter titles which were in the Peerage of the United Kingdom. The interrelated histories of the peerages follow below.

== Viscount Clifden ==
James Agar, 1st Viscount Clifden was the son of Henry Agar of Gowran Castle and the elder brother of Charles Agar, 1st Earl of Normanton. His mother was Anne Ellis, daughter of Welbore Ellis, Bishop of Meath, and sister of the politician Welbore Ellis, who in 1794 was created Baron Mendip in the Peerage of Great Britain with remainder to his three nephews Lord Clifden, the future Lord Normanton and another brother of theirs. Lord Clifden was succeeded by his son, the second Viscount. He represented County Kilkenny in the Irish House of Commons and Heytesbury in the British House of Commons.

In 1802, he succeeded his great-uncle Welbore Ellis, 1st Baron Mendip as second Baron Mendip according to the special remainder, and in 1804 assumed by royal license the additional arms and surname Ellis. The titles were to remain united until the extinction of the barony and viscountcy of Clifden in 1974. Lord Clifden's only son George James Welbore Agar-Ellis was created Baron Dover in 1831 (see below), but predeceased his father. He was therefore succeeded by his grandson, the third Viscount, who had already succeeded his father as second Baron Dover in 1833. His only son, the fourth Viscount, died unmarried at an early age, when the titles passed to his uncle, the fifth Viscount. He had previously represented County Kilkenny in Parliament as a Liberal.

On his death, the barony of Dover became extinct, while he was succeeded in the other titles by his kinsman the second Baron Robartes, who became the sixth Viscount. He was the son of Thomas James Agar-Robartes, who was created Baron Robartes in 1869 (see below), son of Hon. Charles Bagenal-Agar, youngest son of the first Viscount Clifden. The sixth Viscount had earlier represented Cornwall East in Parliament as a Liberal and also served as Lord Lieutenant of Cambridgeshire from 1906 to 1915. His eldest son Captain the Hon. Thomas Agar-Robartes sat as Liberal Member of Parliament for Bodmin and St Austell, but was killed in the First World War, predeceasing his father, unmarried.

Lord Clifden was therefore succeeded by his second son, the seventh Viscount. He sat as a Liberal in the House of Lords and served as a Lord-in-waiting (government whip) from 1940 to 1945 in the war-time coalition of Winston Churchill. On the death of his younger brother, the eighth Viscount, the barony and viscountcy of Clifden and barony of Robartes became extinct, while he was succeeded in the barony of Mendip according to the special remainder by his distant relative the sixth Earl of Normanton.

The family seats were Gowran Castle in Ireland and Holdenby House in Northamptonshire, while the family's townhouse was Dover House in Whitehall, London. When the titles were inherited by the Robartes-Agar branch of the family in Agar-Robartes, the family seat was at Lanhydrock House in Cornwall.

== Baron Mendip ==
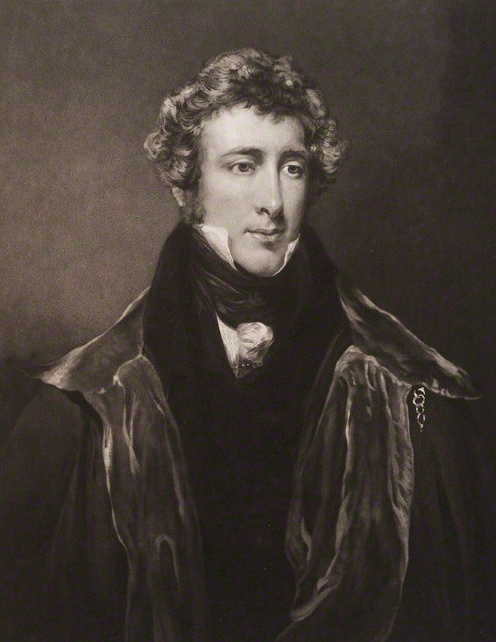
George Agar-Ellis, 1st Baron Dover

The title of Baron Mendip, of Mendip in the County of Somerset, was created in the Peerage of Great Britain in 1794 for the politician Welbore Ellis, with remainder to the three eldest sons of his sister Anne Ellis, wife of Henry Agar (which included James Agar, 1st Viscount Clifden and Charles Agar, 1st Earl of Normanton). Lord Mendip died childless and was succeeded according to the special remainder by his great-nephew the second Viscount Clifden, who became the second Baron Mendip as well.

== Baron Dover ==
The title of Baron Dover, of Dover in the County of Kent, was created in the Peerage of the United Kingdom in 1831 for the Whig politician the Hon. George Agar-Ellis, only son of the second Viscount Clifden. Agar-Ellis represented Heytesbury, Seaford, Ludgershall and Okehampton in the House of Commons and served under Lord Grey as First Commissioner of Woods and Forests from 1830 to 1831. On Lord Dover's early death in 1833, the title passed to his eldest son, the second Baron. In 1836 he also succeeded his grandfather as third Viscount Clifden.

== Baron Robartes ==
The title of Baron Robartes, of Lanhydrock, and of Truro in the County of Cornwall, was created in the Peerage of the United Kingdom in 1869 for Thomas Agar-Robartes, who had previously represented Cornwall East in Parliament. He was the son of Hon. Charles Bagenal-Agar, youngest son of James Agar, 1st Viscount Clifden (see above). His mother was Anna Maria Hunt, great-niece and heiress of Henry Robartes, 3rd Earl of Radnor (whose titles became extinct in 1757). On 30 March 1822, he assumed the additional surname and arms of Robartes by royal licence. Lord Robartes' son, the second Baron, succeeded his kinsman as sixth Viscount Clifden in 1899. For further history of the peerages, see the Viscount Clifden above.

== Viscounts Clifden (1781–1974) ==
- James Agar, 1st Viscount Clifden (1735–1788)
- Henry Welbore Ellis, 2nd Viscount Clifden (1761–1836)
  - George James Welbore Agar-Ellis, 1st Baron Dover (1797–1833)
- Henry Agar-Ellis, 3rd Viscount Clifden (1825–1866)
- Henry George Agar-Ellis, 4th Viscount Clifden (1863–1895)
- Leopold George Frederick Agar-Ellis, 5th Viscount Clifden (1829–1899)
- Thomas Charles Agar-Robartes, 6th Viscount Clifden (1844–1930)
  - Hon. Thomas Charles Reginald Agar-Robartes (1880–1915)
- Francis Gerald Agar-Robartes, 7th Viscount Clifden (1883–1966)
- Arthur Agar-Robartes, 8th Viscount Clifden (1887–1974)

== Barons Mendip (1794–present) ==
- Welbore Ellis, 1st Baron Mendip (1713–1802)
- Henry Welbore Ellis, 2nd Viscount Clifden and 2nd Baron Mendip (1761–1836)
  - George James Welbore Agar-Ellis, 1st Baron Dover (1797–1833)
- Henry Agar-Ellis, 3rd Viscount Clifden and 3rd Baron Mendip (1825–1866)
- Henry George Agar-Ellis, 4th Viscount Clifden and 4th Baron Mendip (1863–1895)
- Leopold George Frederick Agar-Ellis, 5th Viscount Clifden and 5th Baron Mendip (1829–1899)
- Thomas Charles Agar-Robartes, 6th Viscount Clifden and 6th Baron Mendip (1844–1930)
  - Hon. Thomas Charles Reginald Agar-Robartes (1880–1915)
- Francis Gerald Agar-Robartes, 7th Viscount Clifden and 7th Baron Mendip (1883–1966)
- Arthur Agar-Robartes, 8th Viscount Clifden and 8th Baron Mendip (1887–1974)
- Shaun James Christian Welbore Ellis Agar, 6th Earl of Normanton and 9th Baron Mendip (1945–2019)
- James Shaun Christian Welbore Ellis Agar, 7th Earl of Normanton and 10th Baron Mendip (b. 1982)

== Barons Dover (1831–1899) ==
- George James Welbore Agar-Ellis, 1st Baron Dover (1797–1833)
- Henry Agar-Ellis, 2nd Baron Dover and 3rd Viscount Clifden (1825–1866)

For further Barons Dover, see "Viscounts Clifden" above

== Barons Robartes (1869–1974) ==
- Thomas James Agar-Robartes, 1st Baron Robartes (1808–1882)
- Thomas Charles Agar-Robartes, 2nd Baron Robartes and 6th Viscount Clifden (1844–1930)

For further Barons Robartes, see "Viscounts Clifden" above

== See also ==
- Earl of Normanton
- Earl of Radnor (1679 creation)
- Countess of Brandon
