= Edward Agar, 5th Earl of Normanton =

British and Irish peer, soldier and landowner (1910-1967)

Edward John Sidney Christian Welbore Ellis Agar 5th Earl of Normanton
- Born: 29 March 1910
- Died: 28 January 1967 (aged 56)
- Other name: Viscount Somerton
- Education: West Downs School, Eton College
- Alma mater: Trinity College, Cambridge
- Occupations: Peer, soldier & landowner
- Spouse(s): Barbara Mary Prior-Palmer (m. 1937; div. 1943) Lady Fiona Pratt (m. 1944)
- Children: 2
- Parents: Sidney Agar (father); Amy Frederica Alice Byng (mother)
- Relatives: Shaun Agar (son)
- Military career
- Allegiance: United Kingdom
- Branch: British Army
- Service years: 1933-1935; 1940-1945
- Rank: Captain
- Unit: Royal Horse Guards
- Conflicts: World War II

Edward John Sidney Christian Welbore Ellis Agar, 5th Earl of Normanton (29 March 1910 – 28 January 1967) was a British and Irish peer, soldier, and landowner, a member of the House of Lords from 1933 until his death.

From birth until 1933 he was known by the courtesy title of Viscount Somerton.

== Early life ==
The only son of Sidney James Agar, 4th Earl of Normanton, and his wife Lady Amy Frederica Alice Byng, he was educated at West Downs School, Eton, and Trinity College, Cambridge, graduating BA.

== Career ==
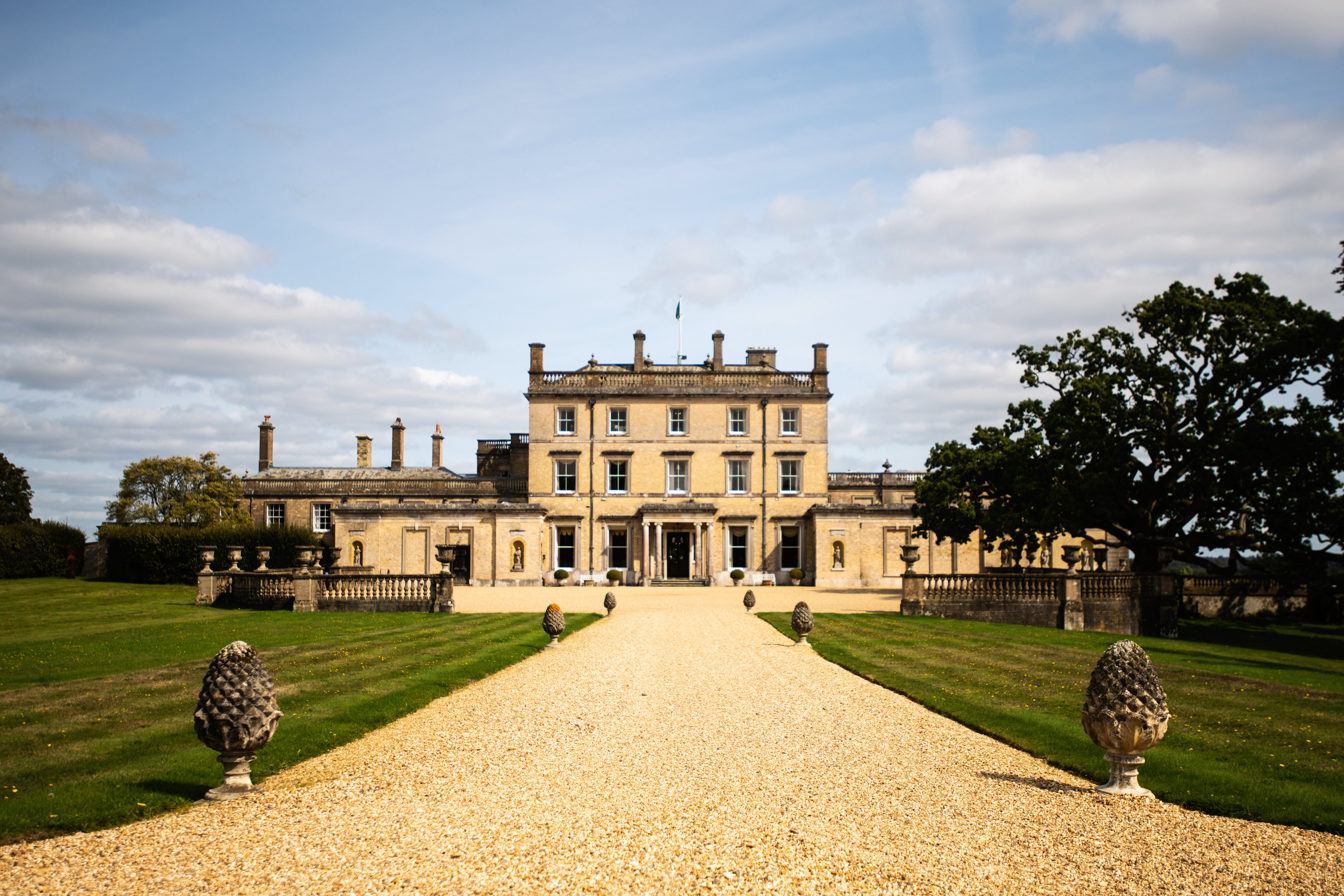
Somerley House

As Viscount Somerton, Normanton was commissioned into the Royal Horse Guards. On 25 November 1933, he succeeded his father as Earl of Normanton, Viscount Somerton, and Baron Somerton, all in the peerage of Ireland, and as Baron Somerton of Somerley in the peerage of the United Kingdom. The last of these gave him a seat in the House of Lords. From his father, he also inherited Somerley House in Hampshire and an estate of some 7,000 acres, and an art collection which included the Somerley Venus and Adonis by Titian.

On 13 November 1935, Normanton resigned his commission and transferred as a lieutenant from the active list to the Regular Army Reserve of Officers. During the Second World War, he returned to the army and rose to the rank of Captain.

He died in 1967 aged only 56, without having planned for the inheritance tax on his estate, and as a result, his son owed 88 per cent of the value of the property for that.

== Private life ==
On 5 July 1937, Normanton married firstly Barbara Mary Prior-Palmer, a daughter of Sir Frederick William Francis George Frankland, 10th Baronet, and Mary Cecil Curzon, 17th Baroness Zouche. She was previously married to Otho Prior-Palmer, who in 1936 had successfully sued her for divorce on the grounds of her adultery with Normanton. They were divorced in 1943. On 30 October 1944, Normanton married secondly Lady Fiona Pratt, a daughter of John Pratt, 4th Marquess Camden, and Lady Joan Marion Nevill. She had previously been married to Sir John Gerard Henry Fleetwood Fuller, 2nd Baronet and had two young sons, John Fuller (1936–1998) and Anthony Fuller (born 1940).

With his second wife, Normanton had two sons:

- Shaun James Christian Welbore Ellis Agar, 6th Earl of Normanton (1945–2019)
- Mark Sidney Andrew Agar (born 1948)

== Notes ==
Peerage of Ireland
Preceded by Sidney James Agar	Earl of Normanton; 1933–1967	Succeeded by Shaun James Christian Welbore Ellis Agar
Peerage of the United Kingdom
Preceded by Sidney James Agar	Baron Somerton; 1933–1967	Succeeded by Shaun James Christian Welbore Ellis Agar
