= Euseby Cleaver =

English bishop

The Right Reverend and Right Honourable Euseby Cleaver PC (Ire), D.D.
- Archbishop of Dublin; Bishop of Glendalough; Primate of Ireland
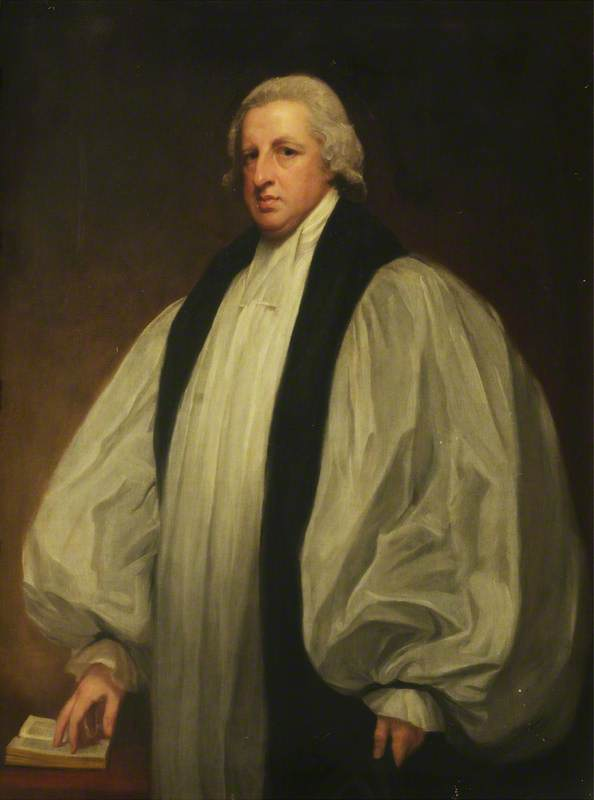
- Church: Church of Ireland
- Diocese: Dublin and Glendalough
- Appointed: 25 August 1809
- In office: 1809-1819
- Predecessor: The Earl of Normanton
- Successor: Lord John Beresford
- Previous posts: Bishop of Cork and Ross (1789); Bishop of Ferns and Leighlin (1789-1809)

Orders
- Consecration: 28 March 1789 by Charles Agar

Personal details
- Born: 8 September 1745 Twyford, Buckinghamshire, England
- Died: 10 February 1819 (aged 73) Tunbridge Wells, Kent, England
- Buried: Fulham, Middlesex
- Denomination: Anglican
- Parents: William Cleaver & Martha Lettice Lushden
- Spouse: Catherine Wynne
- Education: Westminster School; Christ Church, Oxford

Euseby Cleaver (8 September 1745 – 10 December 1819) was the Church of Ireland Bishop of Ferns and Leighlin (1789–1809) in Ireland and subsequently Archbishop of Dublin (1809-1819).

== Life ==
He was of Buckinghamshire origin, the younger son of the Reverend William Cleaver, who ran a school at Twyford, and his wife Martha Lettice Lushden. He was educated at Westminster School and Christ Church, Oxford, graduating B.A. in 1767, M.A. in 1770, B.D. and D.D. in 1783.

In 1774, he was presented to the rectory of Spofforth, North Yorkshire, which he held till 1783, when Lord Egremont, whose tutor he had been, presented him to the rectories of Tillington, West Sussex and Petworth. He was briefly Bishop of Cork and Ross, before in 1789 being translated to Ferns and Leighlin.

During the 1798 insurrection in Ireland his palace in Ferns was ransacked and Cleaver was obliged to take refuge in Beaumaris, Anglesey which was in his brother, William Cleaver's diocese of Bangor, Gwynedd, where he lived at what is now the Bishopsgate Hotel.

His exercise of the Archbishopric of Dublin was cut short for reasons of alleged insanity. He appears to have favoured the use of the Irish language.

== Family ==
He married Catherine Wynne of Hazelwood, County Sligo, by whom he had several children, including William, Frances and Caroline; Caroline married Admiral James William King, and was the mother of the prominent evangelist Catherine Pennefather. The Archbishop's wife died on 1 May 1816. His brother William Cleaver was successively bishop of Chester and (1800) bishop of Bangor.

Church of Ireland titles
Preceded by Charles Agar	Archbishop of Dublin; 1809–1819	Succeeded by John Beresford
