= Shaun Agar, 6th Earl of Normanton =

Irish and British peer (1945–2019)

Shaun James Christian Welbore Ellis Agar, 6th Earl of Normanton (21 August 1945 – 13 February 2019) was an Irish and British peer, soldier, landowner, and powerboat racer. From birth until 1967 he was known by the courtesy title of Viscount Somerton. As Baron Somerton of Somerley and later as Baron Mendip he was a member of the House of Lords from 1967 until the reform of the Lords in 1999.

== Early life ==
Normanton was the elder son of Edward John Sidney Christian Welbore Ellis Agar, 5th Earl of Normanton, and his wife Lady Fiona Pratt, a daughter of John Pratt, 4th Marquess Camden, who had previously been married to Sir John Gerard Henry Fleetwood Fuller, 2nd Baronet. He had two half-brothers, John Fuller (1936–1998) and Anthony Fuller (born 1940).

He was educated at Eton and Aiglon College in Switzerland and trained as a cavalry officer at the Mons Officer Cadet School.

== Career ==
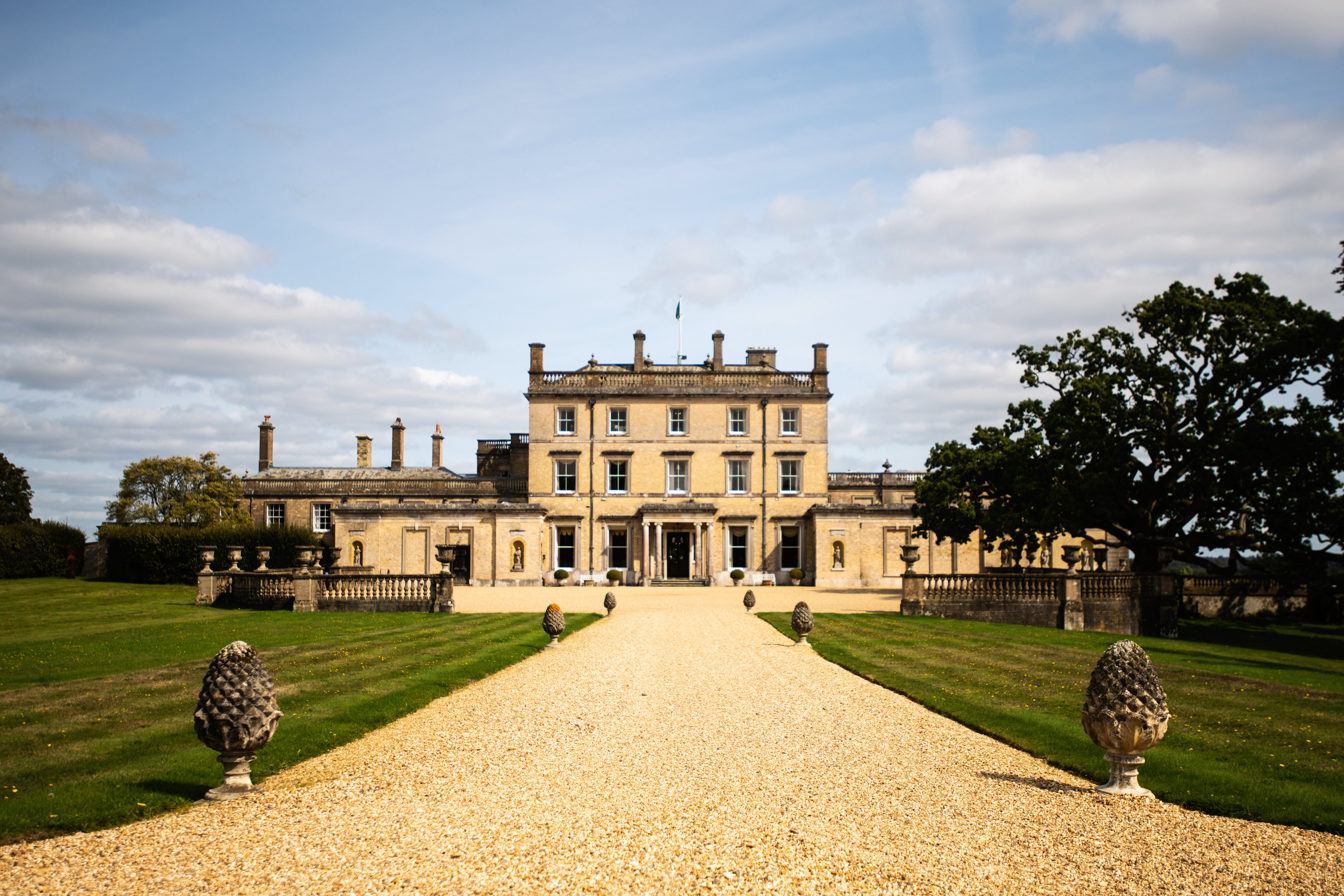
Somerley House

As Viscount Somerton, Normanton was commissioned into the Royal Horse Guards direct from Mons on 3 April 1965. On his father’s early death in 1967, he succeeded him as Earl of Normanton, Viscount Somerton, and Baron Somerton of Somerton, County Kilkenny, all in the peerage of Ireland, and also as Baron Somerton of Somerley, in the peerage of the United Kingdom, which gave him a seat in the House of Lords. He was promoted from Second Lieutenant to Lieutenant in March 1968 and in 1972 transferred from the active list of the Blues and Royals to the Regular Army Reserve of Officers. From his father, he inherited Somerley House in Hampshire and an estate of some 7,000 acres, but his father had died at the age of 56 without planning for inheritance tax, and 88 per cent of the value of the property was owed for that. Normanton commercialized the parkland, turning it into a golf club, opened the house to the public, and organized many events to raise money, including festivals, concerts, and clay pigeon shoots. One of these was the Ellingham Show. He also became a professional powerboat racer.

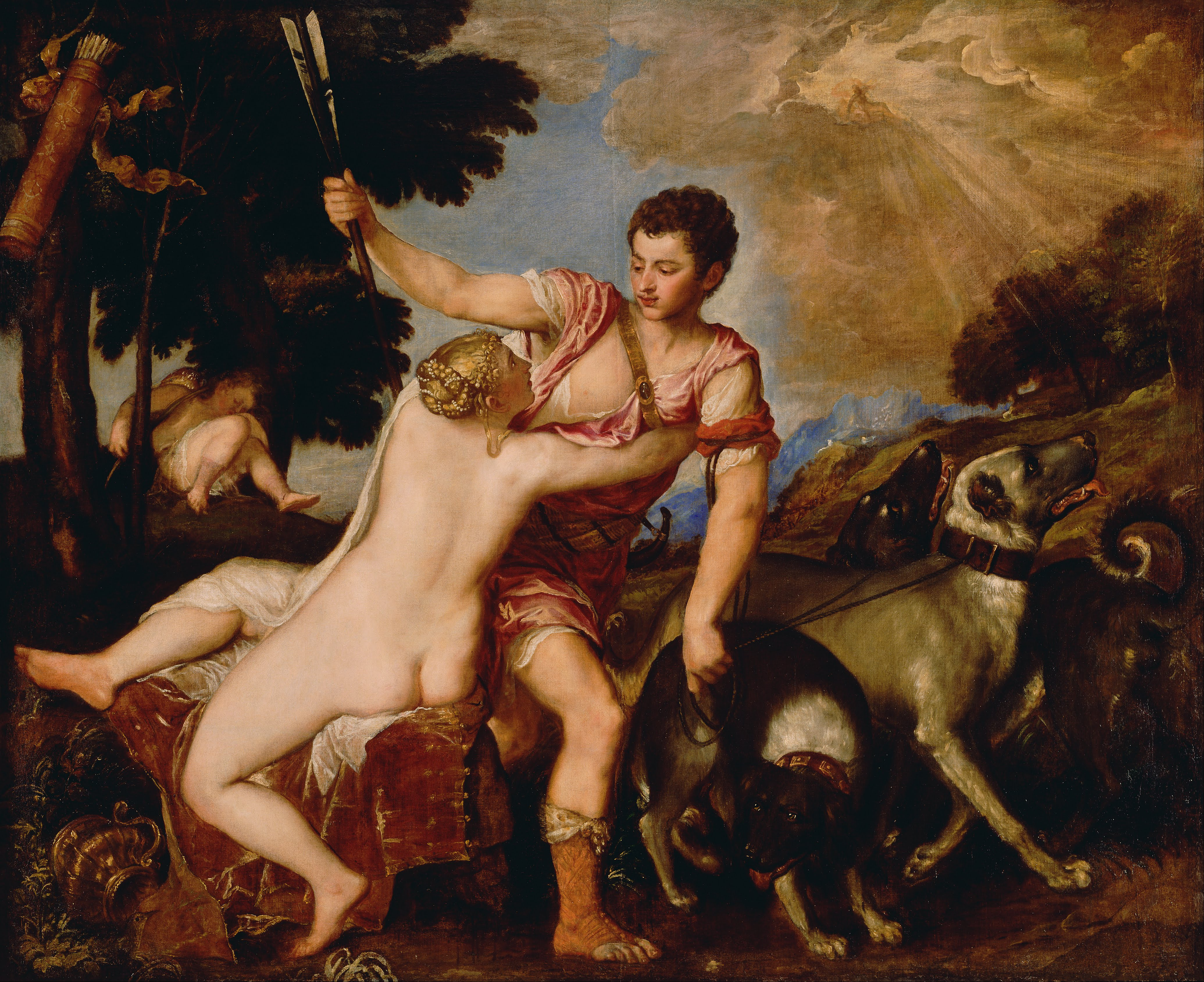
The Somerley Venus and Adonis

In 1974, he succeeded a distant cousin, Arthur Agar-Robartes, 8th Viscount Clifden, as Baron Mendip of Mendip, in the peerage of Great Britain. In the Normanton sale at Christie's, King Street, St James's, on 13 December 1991, Normanton sold the Somerley Venus and Adonis by Titian; it was soon acquired by the J. Paul Getty Museum.

Dod's Parliamentary Companion (1991) states that Normanton was a member of White's and the Royal Yacht Squadron. In Who Owns Britain (2001), he was reported as still owning 6,000 acres.

Normanton died on 13 February 2019.

== Personal life ==
On 29 April 1970, Normanton married firstly Victoria Susan Beard, a daughter of John H. C. Beard, formerly of Melbourne, Australia, where she had been born. They were divorced in 2000, and in 2010 he married secondly Rosalind Bernice Nott.

By his first wife, Normanton had two daughters and a son:

- Lady Portia Caroline Agar (born 1976)
- Lady Marisa Charlotte Agar (born 1979)
- James Shaun Christian Welbore Ellis Agar, Viscount Somerton, later 7th Earl of Normanton (born 1982).

== Notes ==
Peerage of Ireland
Preceded by Edward John Sidney Christian Welbore Ellis Agar	Earl of Normanton; 1967–2019	Succeeded by James Shaun Christian Welbore Ellis Agar
Peerage of the United Kingdom
Preceded by Edward John Sidney Christian Welbore Ellis Agar	Baron Somerton; 1967–2019	Succeeded by James Shaun Christian Welbore Ellis Agar
Peerage of Great Britain
Preceded by Arthur Agar-Robartes	Baron Mendip; 1974–2019	Succeeded by James Shaun Christian Welbore Ellis Agar
