= Welbore Ellis Agar =

Anglo-Irish gentleman 1736–1805

Welbore Ellis Agar FRS (1735 – 30 October 1805) was an Anglo-Irish gentleman, senior officer of HM Revenue and Customs, and art collector, who lived most of his life in Mayfair, Westminster.

== Life ==
Agar was the middle son of Henry Agar of Gowran Castle, County Kilkenny, and his wife Anne Ellis, a daughter of Welbore Ellis, Bishop of Meath. His elder brother became James Agar, 1st Viscount Clifden, while his younger brother was Charles Agar, a clergyman who as Bishop of Cloyne was created Earl of Normanton in the peerage of Ireland and ended his career as Archbishop of Dublin.

Agar was educated at Westminster School between 1747 and about 1754. After leaving school, he joined HM Revenue and Customs, which gave him a career with good prospects.

Agar lived most of his adult life in Mayfair, and his early years in the metropolis were colourful. He has been identified as the "rich and jovial libertine" called "Sir Edgar", the "Chevalier Egard", or "Egard" who appears in the Memoirs of his friend Giacomo Casanova, who visited England in 1763–64, the two notably sharing in a night of sexual revelry. A letter from Agar to Casanova survives.

In 1769, Agar married Gertrude Hotham, whose mother, a Stanhope, was a sister of the Earl of Chesterfield. The marriage brought Agar land in London and Essex. In 1769, he and his wife each had substantial investments in the East India Company. In letters from Chesterfield to his niece Gertrude, Agar is mentioned fondly. In 1776, Agar was promoted to Commissioner of Customs, and in 1777 to Muster Master General.

Gertrude died in 1780, leaving all her property and £11,000 in investments to her husband. A letter from Agar to Charles Hotham appears to show that he was greatly affected by her death. Later that year, after his inheritance, Agar subscribed £15,000 to a loan, showing a good deal of liquidity, the sum being equivalent to £2,514,752 in 2023. In 1781, Agar was elected a Fellow of the Royal Society.

Agar had two sons, both seemingly illegitimate, who were baptised at St Marylebone on 20 March 1798. Their mother's name was given as Mary Anne Agar. The date of birth of the elder son, Welbore Felix Agar, was stated in the parish register as 24 October 1779, a year before the death of Gertrude, and that of the younger son, Emanuel Felix Agar as 22 February 1781. Their father was named.

Agar died on 30 October 1805 and was buried at St George's, Hanover Square, on 6 November.

== Art collector ==
Agar's activity as a buyer of pictures peaked in the 1780s and 1790s. He bought in England, but also through agents in France and Italy, and sometimes in person, building up an important collection reported in 1806 to be famous throughout Europe. By the time of his death, he owned some 120 works by old masters, including Velazquez, Poussin, Lorrain, Rubens, Murillo and Guido Reni.

After Agar's death, a great auction sale of his collection was planned and advertised by James Christie the Younger, acting on behalf of Agar's sons, to take place on 2 and 3 May 1806, and many picture dealers travelled to England from continental Europe; but in vain, as at the end of April the whole collection was bought by Earl Grosvenor for £35,000 (equivalent to £3,600,000 in 2023), so the auction was abandoned. The price was negotiated between William Seguier, acting for Grosvenor, and Noël Desenfans and Francis Bourgeois acting for Agar's sons. All Agar's paintings therefore joined the Grosvenor collection, where some of them remain. Although no copies of the auction catalogue in English have survived, the details of the collection are found in a French language version, Catalogue raisonné de la collection de Monsieur Welbore Ellis Agar par J. Christie en sa Grande Salle dans Pall Mall a Londres, le Vendredi 2 Mai, 1806, et jour suivant, which had been printed in Dresden and circulated in the weeks before the planned auction.

One picture from Agar's collection, David Meeting Abigail, from the workshop of Rubens, is now owned by the J. Paul Getty Museum.

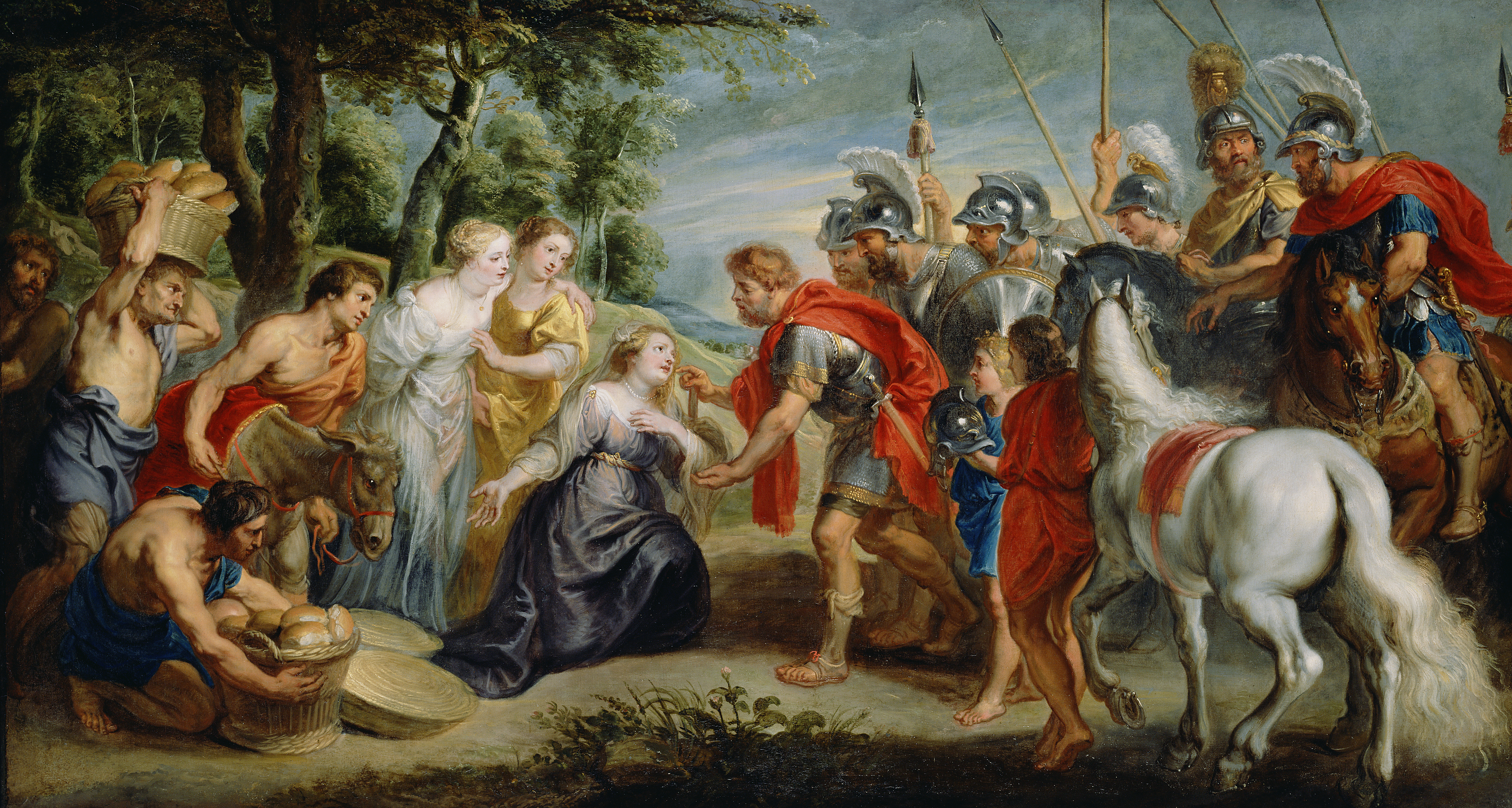
David Meeting Abigail, workshop of Peter Paul Rubens

== Will ==
In his will, dated 25 June 1804, Agar leaves his estate to his two sons, describing them as "Welbore Felix Agar, now living with me at my house in New Norfolk Street, and Lieutenant Emanuel Felix Agar of the first Regiment of Life Guards and now living at Hyde Park Barracks". He also appoints them as his executors. As well as land, he mentions his collection of pictures. The will was proved by the sons in the Prerogative Court of Canterbury at London on 2 November 1805.
