= Countess Henrietta Danneskiold-Samsøe =

Danish-born noblewoman in Victorian Britain (1836–1880)

The Honourable Henrietta Louisa Elizabeth, Countess Danneskiold-Samsøe
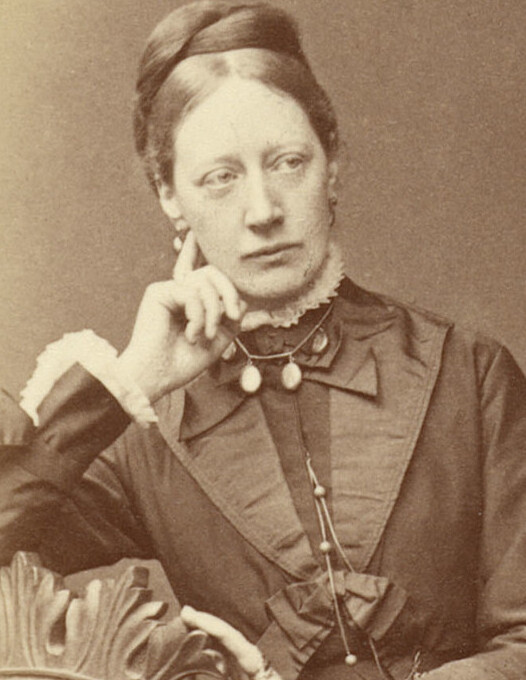
- Henrietta S. Byng in 1873
- Born: 20 January 1836; London, United Kingdom
- Died: 11 January 1880 (aged 43); Wrotham Park, Hertfordshire
- Buried: Byng Mausoleum
- Noble family: Danneskiold-Samsøe
- Spouse: Henry Byng, 4th Earl of Strafford (m. 1863)
- Issue: 4
- Father: Christian Conrad Sophus Danneskiold-Samsøe
- Mother: Lady Elizabeth Brudenell-Bruce

Countess Henrietta "Henny" Louisa Elizabeth Danneskiold-Samsøe (Danish: Henriette Louise Elisabeth, Komtesse Danneskiold-Samsøe; 20 January 1836 – 11 January 1880) was a Danish-born noblewoman and courtier in Victorian Britain, who married Henry Byng, later 4th Earl of Strafford.

Born into the Danneskiold-Samsøe family, a non-dynastic branch of the House of Oldenburg descended from King Christian V, she was the daughter of Danish landowner and courtier Count Christian Conrad Sophus Danneskiold-Samsøe by his English wife Lady Elizabeth Brudenell-Bruce, only daughter of Charles Brudenell-Bruce, 1st Marquess of Ailesbury.

In 1863, she married colonel Henry William John Byng of the Coldstream Guards. She died in 1880 and therefore predeceased her husband's succession to the earldom in 1898, and was known throughout her life by her birth style of Countess. Henrietta and her husband divided their time between Wrotham Park in Hertfordshire and Carlton House Terrace in London.

Active in Victorian court society, Henrietta was presented to Queen Victoria in 1853 and thereafter appeared regularly in the Court Circular as a guest at royal and diplomatic receptions. She attended state concerts at Buckingham Palace and gatherings hosted by the Prince and Princess of Wales, as well as receptions held by leading political figures. In 1863, she was among the guests at the marriage of the Prince of Wales and Princess Alexandra, which brought together the British and Danish royal families.

She died in 1880 at Wrotham Park, aged 43, and was buried at Potters Bar, alongside her husband in the Byng Mausoleum.

== Early life ==
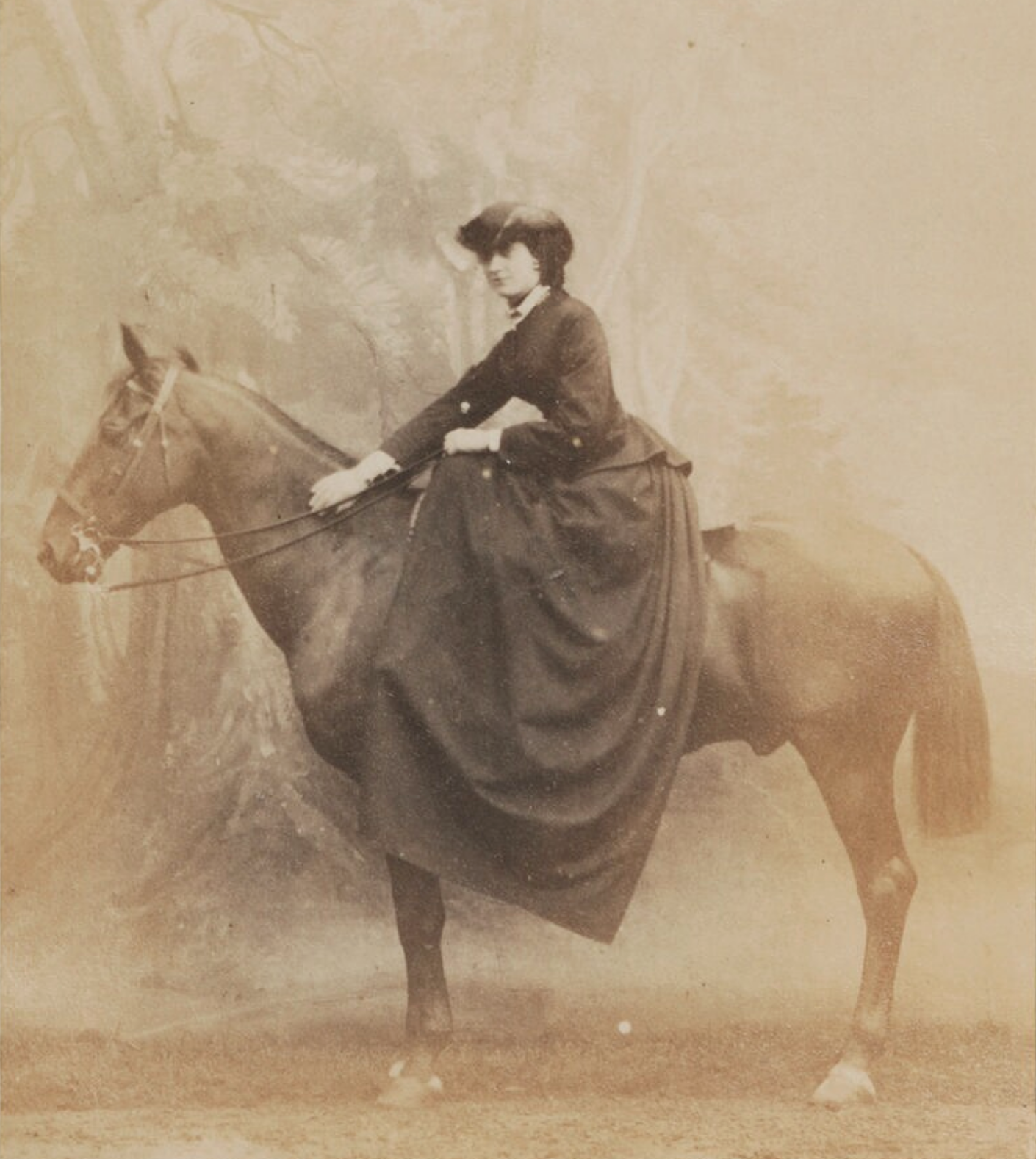
Countess Henrietta on horseback. Photograph by Camille Silvy, 1860.

Henrietta was born on 20 January 1836 in London. She was the second, but first surviving, child of Count Christian Conrad Sophus Danneskiold-Samsøe by his wife Lady Elizabeth Brudenell-Bruce. Her mother was the only daughter of Charles Brudenell-Bruce, 1st Marquess of Ailesbury and Henrietta Maria Hill, daughter of Noel Hill. Henrietta spent her early years in England and Denmark: her father served as overdirector of the Gisselfeld foundation and oversaw the Holmegaard Glass Factory, while the family had close ties to Wiltshire through her mother's Ailesbury kin. She was called Henny by the family.

At age one, in 1837 she was appointed the fifth prioress (abbess) of the noble Gisselfeld Convent (Danish: Gisselfeld Adelige Jomfrukloster), an honorary but prestigious title given to a female dynast of the house of Danneskiold-Samsøe. She held the position until her marriage in 1863. She was succeeded by her younger sister, Countess Caroline Amalie (Amy) Danneskiold-Samsøe.

Her mother died when Henrietta was 11, and her father remarried in 1850.

== Presentation and court activities ==
In 1853, Henrietta, aged 18, was presented to Queen Victoria at a Drawing Room held at St James’s Palace, the first of that season. Over two hundred ladies were received by the Queen and Prince Albert, together with members of the royal family. She was presented by Ida Marie Bille, the wife of the Danish Ambassador to the United Kingdom, Christian Høyer Bille. The Court Circular noted her father’s position as Grand Échanson to Frederick VII of Denmark. From then on, she participated on several occasions at court events, such as when she was a guest at a state ball held by the Queen in 1857.

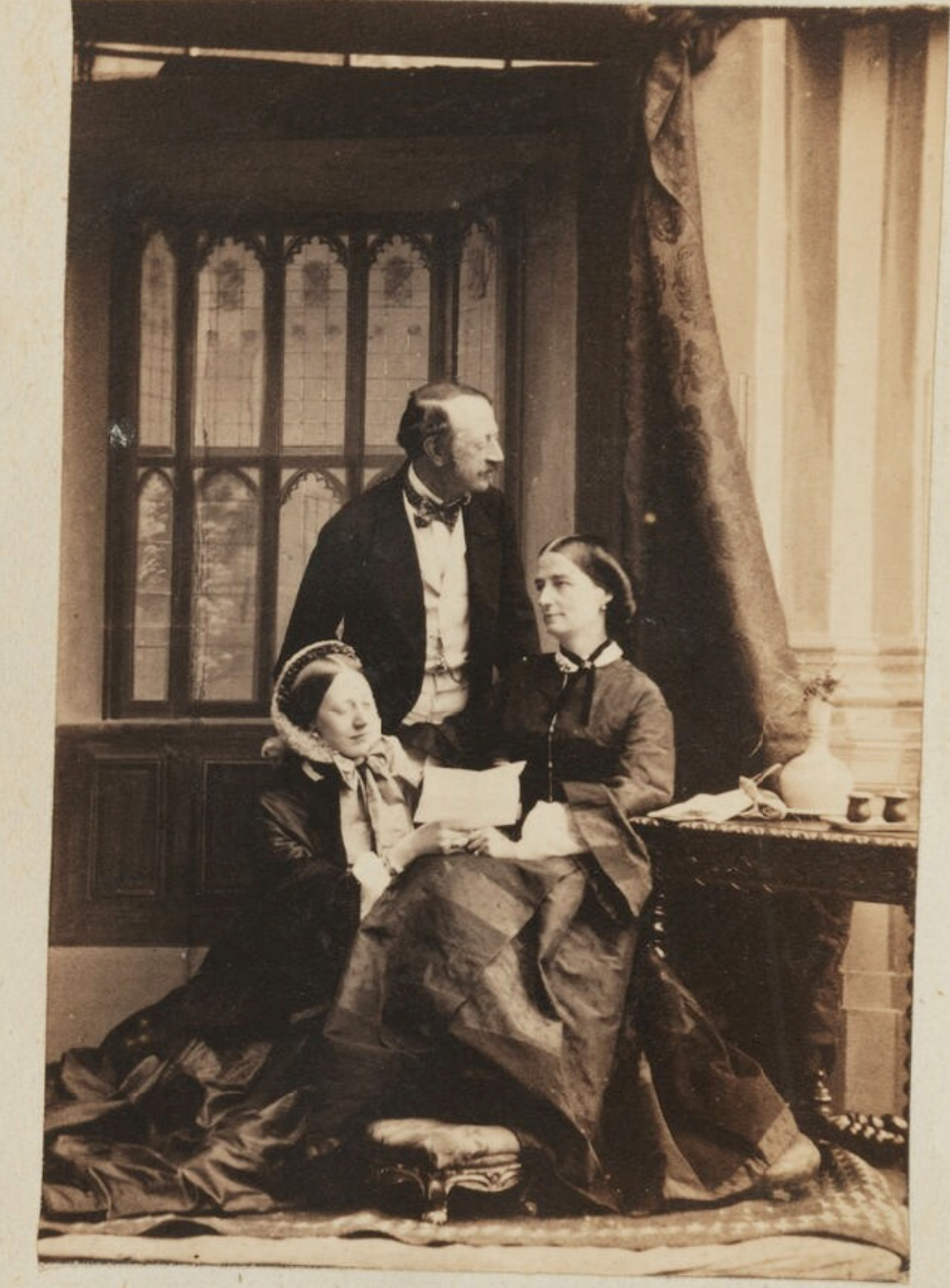
Family group photograph by Camille Silvy, 1860. Henrietta (seated right), with her maternal uncle, George Brudenell-Bruce, 2nd Marquess of Ailesbury, and aunt Mary Caroline (née Herbert).

On 30 April 1860 at St. James Palace, she was personally introduced to Queen Victoria, by the Lady John Russel, wife of Prime Minister John Russell, 1st Earl Russell. She was described in the Court Circular as "a Danish lady".

In the early 1860s, she was recorded as attending several court functions, including state concerts at Buckingham Palace in May 1860 and June 1861, held by command of Queen Victoria and Prince Consort Albert.

In March 1863, she participated in an evening party held by the Queen in honour of Princess Alexandra. Both the British and Danish royal family participated, together with much of the nobility and gentry. In July of the same year, Henrietta was among the guests at a reception and evening assembly hosted by Prime Minister Henry John Temple, 3rd Viscount Palmerston and his wife Emily Temple, Viscountess Palmerston at Cambridge House in Piccadilly. The event was attended by members of the diplomatic corps and leading political and social figures, including W. E. Gladstone. She attended with her uncle, George Brudenell-Bruce, 2nd Marquess of Ailesbury and the Marchioness.

She was also a guest at gatherings hosted by her first cousin, Prince Christian of Schleswig-Holstein, and his British wife Princess Helena.

On 10 March 1863, she attended the wedding of the Prince of Wales and Princess Alexandra, and is portrayed in G. H. Thomas’s painting The Marriage of H.R.H. the Prince of Wales, exhibited at the German Gallery in London, where she is listed among the identified sitters. Later in March, Henrietta attended the dinner at Buckingham Palace hosted by the Prince and Princess of Wales in honour of the visiting Danish royal family. Among the guests were her father, Count Christian, her sister Amy, and other members of the Danish legation, together with Princess Dagmar (later Empress Maria Feodorovna of Russia), Prince Frederick, and Prince William of Denmark.

Her social engagements often included members of her extended Anglo-Danish kin: her father, Count Christian Danneskiold-Samsøe; her sister Amy Danneskiold-Samsøe; and her maternal uncle George Brudenell-Bruce, 2nd Marquess of Ailesbury, with his wife Mary Caroline, Marchioness of Ailesbury. Through her wider family connections she was first cousin to Prince Christian of Schleswig-Holstein (whose mother was Countess Louise Danneskiold-Samsøe, Duchess of Augustenburg), who married Princess Helena.

Henrietta and her family lived at the estate of Wrotham Park in Hertfordshire, and in London at Carlton House Terrace.

== Marriage ==
On 15 October 1863, she married British courtier and colonel Henry Byng (later 4th Earl of Strafford) at St Katharine's Church, Great Bedwyn, Savernake Forest, Wiltshire. He was the son of George Byng, 2nd Earl of Strafford and his first wife, Lady Agnes Paget, a daughter of Field Marshal Henry Paget, 1st Marquess of Anglesey and of Lady Caroline Elizabeth Villiers. Her husband succeeded to the earldom in 1898, but she predeceased him and thus never became countess; in Britain she was known as The Hon. Mrs (Henry) Byng, while retaining her Danish birth style of Countess Danneskiold-Samsøe.

They had four children:

- Lady Mary Elizabeth Agnes Byng (1864–1946), married Count Maurice de Mauny Talvande
- Lady Amy Frederica Alice Byng (1865–1961), married Sidney James Agar, 4th Earl of Normanton
- Hon. George Albert Edward Alexander Byng (1867–1893)
- Hon. John George Thomas Wentworth Byng (1870–1894)

In October 1863, Danneskiold-Samsøe and her sister, Countess Amy, attended a dinner given by the Prince of Wales at Marlborough House in honour of King George I of Greece. Among the company were the Duke of Cambridge, the Danish Minister Christian Høyer Bille, the Marquess and Marchioness of Ailesbury, members of the Danish legation, and senior courtiers including Lord Harris, Odo Russell, and Lieutenant-General Knollys. The band of the Coldstream Guards performed during dinner.

Her fraternal niece, Countess Mary Danneskiold-Samsøe, married Sir Edward Goschen, 2nd Baronet.

== Death and funeral ==
She died on 11 January 1880, aged 43, at Wrotham Park, and was buried on 17 January at Potters Bar, Middlesex. She is commemorated with her husband at the Byng Mausoleum on the Wrotham Park estate.

Among the funeral attendants were her husband and four children, her father Count Christian Danneskiold-Samsøe, the Marchioness of Ailesbury, Lords Robert and Charles Bruce, Viscount Torrington, and other relatives of the Brudenell-Bruce and Byng families. Other attendees included Richard Meade, 4th Earl of Clanwilliam and Catherine Murray, Countess of Dunmore with families. The service was conducted by the Hon. and Rev. Francis Byng and the Rev. E. Ketur Browne, assisted by the Rev. H. G. Watkins, vicar of Potter’s Bar. Queen Victoria sent wreaths, represented by Lord Colville of Culross acting for the Prince and Princess of Wales, while Colonel George Gordon attended on behalf of Prince and Princess Christian. Owing to "indisposition", her father-in-law, the 2nd Earl of Strafford was unable to attend.
