= Francis Agar-Robartes, 7th Viscount Clifden =

British Liberal politician

Viscount Clifden
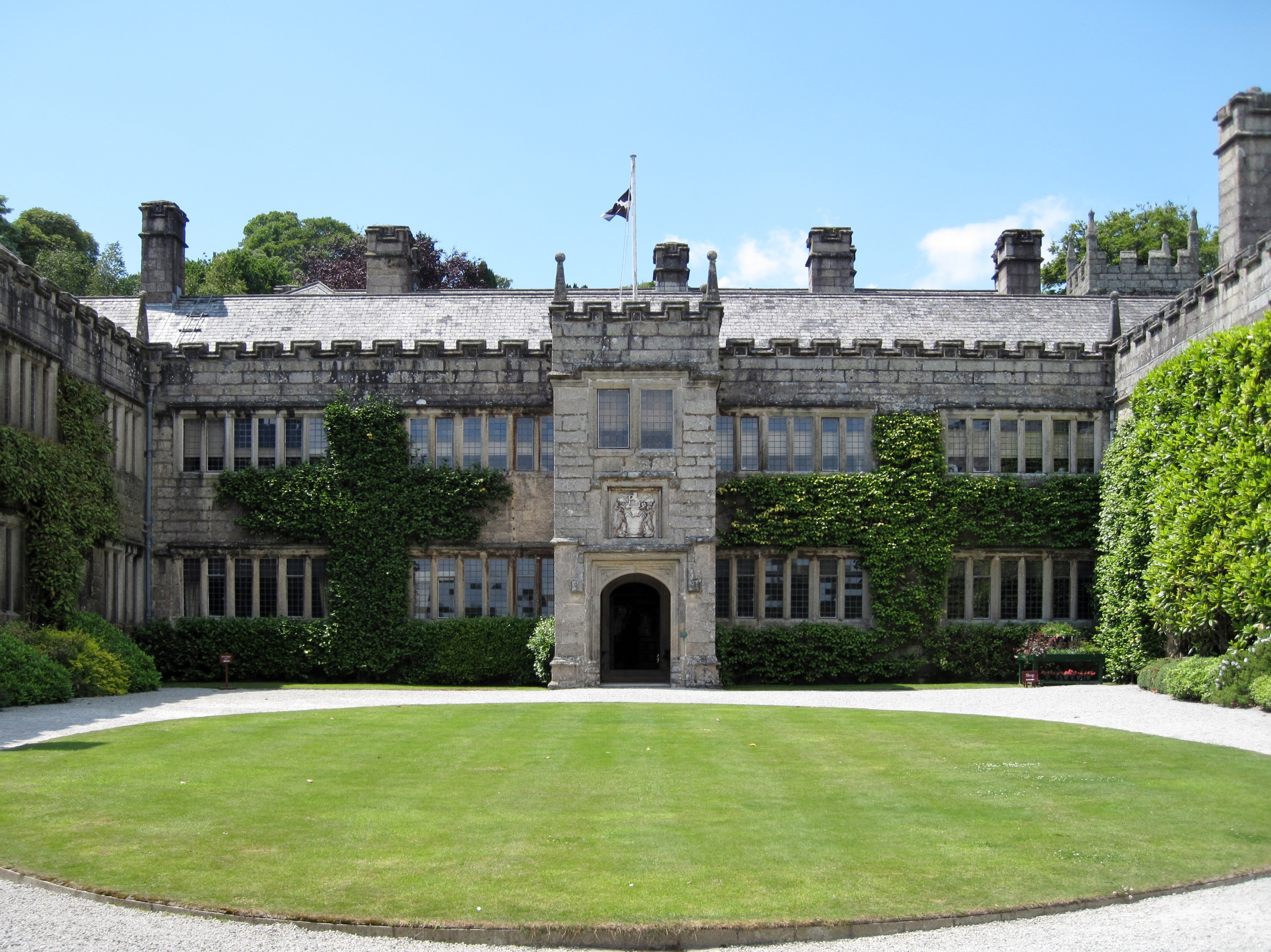
- Born: Francis Gerald Agar-Robartes; 14 April 1883; London, England
- Died: 15 July 1966 (aged 83); Cornwall, England, UK
- Occupations: Diplomat and politician

Francis Gerald Agar-Robartes, 7th Viscount Clifden (14 April 1883 – 15 July 1966), was a British Liberal politician.

Clifden was the second but eldest surviving son, due to his elder brother (Captain the Hon. Thomas Agar-Robartes) dying in the First World War). He was the son of Thomas Agar-Robartes, 6th Viscount Clifden, and his wife Mary (née Dickenson), and was educated at Eton and Christ Church, Oxford. In 1930, he succeeded his father in the viscountcy and to Lanhydrock House, and took his seat on the Liberal benches in the House of Lords.

From 1940 to 1945, he served as a Lord-in-waiting (government whip in the House of Lords) in Winston Churchill's coalition government.

In 1953, he donated the Lanhydrock House and approximately 160 hectares (400 acres) of parkland to the National Trust.

== Death ==
Lord Clifden died in July 1966, aged 83. He never married and was succeeded in the viscountcy by his younger brother Arthur.

Peerage of Ireland
Preceded by Thomas Charles Agar-Robartes	Viscount Clifden; 1930–1966	Succeeded by Arthur Victor Agar-Robartes
