= Sidney James Agar, 4th Earl of Normanton =

British-Irish peer & landowner (1865–1933)

Sidney James Agar, 4th Earl of Normanton (9 April 1865 – 25 November 1933) was a British and Irish peer and landowner, a member of the House of Lords from 1896 until his death.

The second son of James Charles Herbert Welbore Ellis Agar, 3rd Earl of Normanton, and his wife Caroline Susan Augusta Barrington, a daughter of Lord Barrington, he was educated at Eton College. On 17 January 1894 his older brother, Charles George Welbore Ellis Agar, Viscount Somerton (born 1858) died unmarried, leaving him as the heir, and on 3 November 1894, shortly after gaining the courtesy title of Viscount Somerton, he married Lady Amy Frederica Alice Byng, a daughter of Henry Byng, 4th Earl of Strafford, and Countess Henrietta Danneskjold-Samsöe.

On 19 December 1896, he succeeded his father as Earl of Normanton, Viscount Somerton, and Baron Somerton, all in the peerage of Ireland, and as Baron Somerton of Somerley in the peerage of the United Kingdom. The last of these gave him a seat in the House of Lords.

Normanton was appointed as a Deputy Lieutenant of Hampshire, an assistant to the Lord Lieutenant of Hampshire, the Earl of Northbrook, a former Viceroy of India.

With his wife he had seven daughters and one son:

- Lady Georgiana Mary Elizabeth Agar (1896–1967)
- Lady Alexandra Henrietta Alice Agar (1897–1971), in 1917 married Peter Haig-Thomas and had seven children
- Lady Caroline Amy Cora Agar (1899–1989)
- Lady Mary Karen Agar (1901–1975), in 1925 married Lt-Cdr Herbert Ernest Pretyman, and had two children
- Lady Diana Julia Agar (1904–1929)
- Lady Amy Louise Agar (1905–1983), in 1925 married Michael Biddulph, 3rd Baron Biddulph, and had four children, including Robert Biddulph, 4th Baron Biddulph
- Lady Rosemary Beatrice Agar (1908–1984), in 1931 married Captain Christopher John Darell Jeffreys, son of George Darell Jeffreys, 1st Baron Jeffreys, and had two sons, including Mark Jeffreys, 2nd Baron Jeffreys (1932–1986)
- Edward John Sidney Christian Welbore Ellis Agar, 5th Earl of Normanton (1910–1967)

== Notes ==
Peerage of Ireland
Preceded by James Agar	Earl of Normanton; 1896–1933	Succeeded by Edward Agar
Peerage of the United Kingdom
Preceded by James Agar	Baron Somerton; 1896–1933	Succeeded by Edward Agar
