= Charles Agar, 1st Earl of Normanton =

Anglo-Irish clergyman

The Right Reverend and Right Honourable The Earl of Normanton PC (Ire), DCL
- Archbishop of Dublin; Bishop of Glendalough; Primate of Ireland
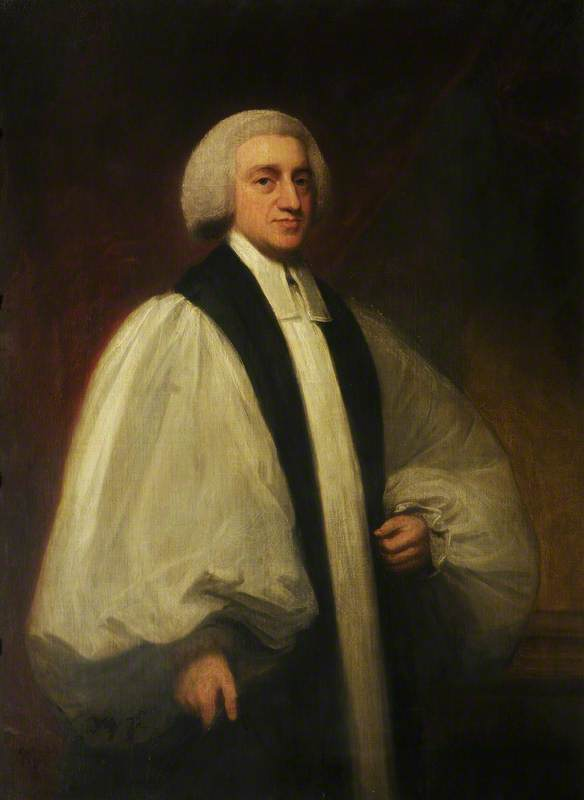
- Portrait by George Romney
- Church: Church of Ireland
- Diocese: Dublin and Glendalough
- Appointed: 7 December 1801
- In office: 1801-1809
- Predecessor: Robert Fowler
- Successor: Euseby Cleaver
- Previous posts: Bishop of Cloyne (1768–1779); Archbishop of Cashel (1779–1801)

Orders
- Consecration: 20 March 1768 by Arthur Smyth

Personal details
- Born: 22 December 1736 Gowran Castle, County Kilkenny, Kingdom of Ireland
- Died: 14 July 1809 (aged 72) London, England
- Buried: Westminster Abbey
- Denomination: Anglican
- Parents: Henry Agar and Anne Ellis
- Spouse: Jane Benson
- Children: 4
- Education: Westminster School
- Alma mater: Christ Church, Oxford

Charles Agar, 1st Earl of Normanton (22 December 1736 – 14 July 1809), was an Anglo-Irish clergyman of the Church of Ireland. He served as Dean of Kilmore, as Bishop of Cloyne, as Archbishop of Cashel, and finally as Archbishop of Dublin from 1801 until his death.

== Early life ==
Agar was the third son of Henry Agar of Gowran in County Kilkenny and his wife Anne Ellis, daughter of the Most Reverend Welbore Ellis, Bishop of Meath. His brothers included James Agar, 1st Viscount Clifden, and Welbore Ellis Agar, a notable art collector.

Welbore Ellis, 1st Baron Mendip, was his maternal uncle.

Agar was educated at Westminster School and Christ Church, Oxford, where he matriculated on 31 May 1755, aged 18. He graduated BA in 1759, promoted by seniority to MA in 1762. On 31 December 1765, he was created a Doctor of Civil Law.

== Career ==
Agar is known to have held particularly marked Calvinistic positions. He served as Dean of Kilmore from 1765 to 1768, and then as Bishop of Cloyne until 1779.

In 1776 he married Jane Benson, a daughter of William Benson, of Downpatrick, County Down. In 1779 he was appointed as Archbishop of Cashel and also joined the Irish Privy Council. In 1784, while he was in office, the new St. John's Cathedral, Cashel, was completed, and two years later its important Samuel Green organ was built.

In 1794 Agar was raised to the Peerage of Ireland as Baron Somerton. In 1801, he was translated to become Archbishop of Dublinand was created Viscount Somerton. In 1806 he was further honoured when he was made Earl of Normanton. These titles were all in the Peerage of Ireland. He remained as archbishop of Dublin until his death in 1809, and from the beginning of 1801 onwards sat in the House of Lords as one of the twenty-eight original Irish representative peer, following the Acts of Union 1800 which united Ireland and Great Britain.

Archbishop Normanton died in July 1809, aged 72, and was succeeded in his secular titles by his son Welbore Ellis Agar. He is buried in the north transept of Westminster Abbey; his widow Jane, Countess of Normanton, was buried alongside him following her death in 1826. His tomb dates from 1815 and was created by John Bacon.

Church of Ireland titles
Preceded by Frederick Augustus Hervey	Bishop of Cloyne; 1768–1779	Succeeded by George Chinnery
Preceded by Michael Cox	Archbishop of Cashel; 1779–1801	Succeeded by Charles Brodrick
Preceded by Robert Fowler	Archbishop of Dublin; 1801–1809	Succeeded by Euseby Cleaver
Parliament of the United Kingdom
New title	Representative peer for Ireland; 1800–1809	Succeeded by The Earl of Rosse
Peerage of Ireland
New creation	Earl of Normanton; 1806–1809	Succeeded by Welbore Ellis Agar
New creation	Viscount Somerton; 1801–1809	Succeeded by Welbore Ellis Agar
New creation	Baron Somerton; 1794–1809	Succeeded by Welbore Ellis Agar
