= Arthur Agar-Robartes, 8th Viscount Clifden =

English cricketer and soldier (1887–1974)

The Right Honourable The Viscount Clifden MC
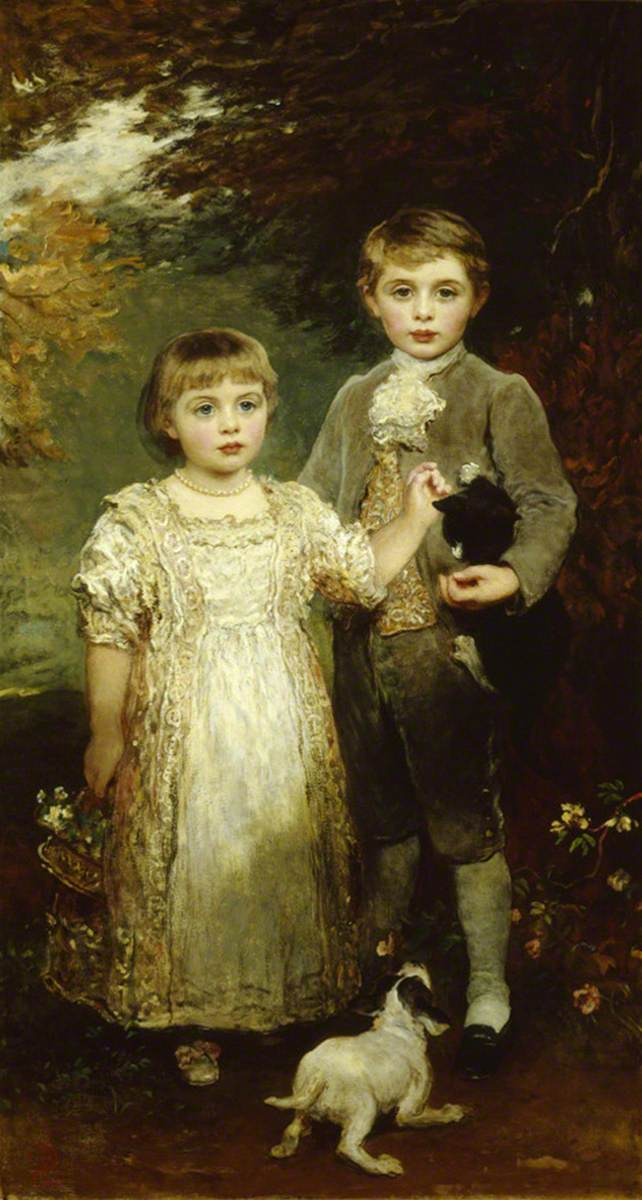
- Portrait of Arthur Agar-Robartes with his sister Edith as children by James Sant.
- Born: Arthur Victor Agar-Robartes; 9 June 1887
- Died: 22 December 1974 (aged 87); Cornwall, England
- Occupations: Soldier and cricketer

Arthur Victor Agar-Robartes, 8th Viscount Clifden, MC (9 June 1887 – 22 December 1974) was a British Army officer and English cricketer.

== Early life ==
Agar-Robartes was the youngest son of Thomas Agar-Robartes, 6th Viscount Clifden, and his wife Mary (née Dickenson). He was educated at Eton College, before attending Brasenose College, Oxford. He was a member of the Bullingdon Club during his time at Oxford. Agar-Robartes was a keen recreational cricketer, playing once for Cornwall in a Minor Counties Championship match in 1904, which was played at his Lanhydrock home.

== Military service ==
Agar-Robartes served in the First World War. He was first mentioned in dispatches in 1915, as a machine-gun officer in the 2nd Battalion Grenadier Guards. He was wounded three times during the course of the war: 8 October 1915, 14 September 1916 and 23 March 1918. He reached the rank of Major and was awarded the Military Cross. His brother, Thomas Agar-Robartes, was killed in action in 1915, being recommended posthumously for the Victoria Cross.

== Later life ==
He succeeded to the viscountcy when his brother, the 7th Viscount Clifden died in July 1966.

Lord Clifden died in December 1974, aged 87. He had married Patience Mary Basset in 1920 but died without male issue, and upon his death all his titles, with the exception of the barony of Mendip (inherited by a distant cousin, Shaun Agar, 6th Earl of Normanton) became extinct. His body is interred at Lanhydrock Parish Church. His daughter Rachel married Captain Cromwell Lloyd-Davies, RN.

Peerage of Ireland
Preceded by Francis Agar-Robartes	Viscount Clifden; 1966–1974	Extinct
Peerage of Great Britain
Preceded by Francis Agar-Robartes	Baron Mendip; 1966–1974	Succeeded by Shaun Agar
