= Maurice Talvande, Count de Mauny Talvande =

French-born British garden designer, writer and furniture maker

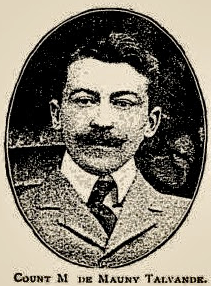

Maurice Talvande (1866–1941), self-styled as the Count de Mauny Talvande, was a French-born naturalised British garden designer, writer, and furniture maker. He is best known as the owner of Taprobane Island in Ceylon (now Sri Lanka).

== Early life ==
Born Maurice Talvande in Le Mans to parents who were not titled, his father was Felix Talvande (a middle-class bank official) and his mother was Marguerite Adélaïde Louise, née Froger de Mauny, known as Madame de Mauny Talvande. She was a granddaughter of a genuine aristocrat of the petty nobility of the duchy of Alençon, Jean Froger de Mauny (1785-1857), who claimed a kinship with the Saintonge noble and more renowned family Froger de la Rigaudière et de l'Éguille.

He attended a Jesuit-run school in Canterbury, England. As a young man, described as "rather good looking", he travelled to America and England where, having assumed the more aristocratic-sounding name of Maurice de Mauny Talvande, he earned a little money giving drawing-room lectures on French châteaux and château life. In 1897, he also gave an address in which he promoted the establishment of settlements for deprived and wayward young men.

== Marriage ==
In June 1898, de Mauny married Lady Mary Byng, daughter of the 4th Earl of Strafford, whom he may have met through her brother, who had attended his school. She was a maid of honour to Queen Victoria. There was talk that Lady Mary married de Mauny, who had no social position or fortune, due to her hostility to her father's second marriage to a wealthy American widow, Cora Smith Colgate.

Shortly prior to his marriage, de Mauny established a small boarding school for teenage boys from upper-class English families seeking to polish their French. Situated at the rented Château Azay-le-Rideau in the Loire Valley, de Mauny relied on his wife's contacts to supply the dozen pupils. It was visited by Lord Lorne and attended by the 2nd Duke of Westminster as a 19-year-old. There were persistent rumours of sexual advances made to the pupils by de Mauny who, when confronted by the Duke, admitted he was homosexual. Possibly due to this, but claiming that he had never intended the château to be used as a school, the château's owner cancelled the lease in late 1898. The Journal des Débats, considered the voice of the Gallic Establishment, called de Mauny a "vulgar marchand de soupe".

The couple relocated to Cannes, where their first child (Victor Alexander) was born, then to San Remo, before finally settling in England. They moved into a Queen Anne-style residence called "Terrick House", near Ellesbrough in Buckinghamshire. In 1900, their daughter Alexandra Mary was born.

It was around this time that de Mauny adopted the title of count. His mother provided the couple with a small allowance, reportedly "almost starving herself for his sake", and de Mauny falsely claimed that he would inherit a large fortune on her death, which enabled the couple to obtain credit. His father had declared bankruptcy in 1890 following the collapse of his bank, and his parents had separated.

Besides dabbling in a number of failed ventures, de Mauny edited an illustrated London newspaper, the Crown. His wife sold her reminiscences as a former maid of honour to a popular journal, The Quiver, a hitherto unprecedented breach of royal confidentiality that drew a public repudiation by Queen Victoria.

In 1899, the 4th Earl of Strafford was decapitated by a train. While his entailed estate passed to the 5th Earl, he had willed the entire remainder of his wealth to his two daughters. Also in 1899, Charles Hammond Gibson Jr privately printed Two Gentlemen in Touraine under the name of Richard Sudbury, a fictional romance about the relationship with de Mauny.

In 1901 de Mauny's father died and his mother in 1907, leaving the family home Domaine du Bourg in Pontvallain to de Mauny and to his brother Roger and sister Suzanne. They shared the 17,000 francs that came from its sale. With the money, de Mauny separated from his wife for a year. Nevertheless, by 1909-10, he was forced to declare bankruptcy.

== Ceylon ==
In 1912, de Mauny visited Ceylon for the first time, possibly as the guest of tea magnate Sir Thomas Lipton. Further visits followed, and by 1920-21, he was residing in Colombo with his now 21-year-old son Victor.

Like many others, the Great War had left de Mauny severely dispirited. He wrote a book of reflections (The Peace of Suffering 1914-1918) and later wrote: "The war had taken everything from me. The whole of my being, both physical and moral, had lost its object in life. Paralysed, inert, it was incapable of effort because I had lost even the desire of effort. I was flickering out a living death, a life worse than death, because it no longer had the confidence of hope….It is to the East that I owe the awakening of the desire of effort; it is to my gardens of Taprobane that I owe the strength that has enabled me to transform the desire of effort into the reality of action, thanks to the peace and happiness which they have given me."

=== Taprobane Island ===
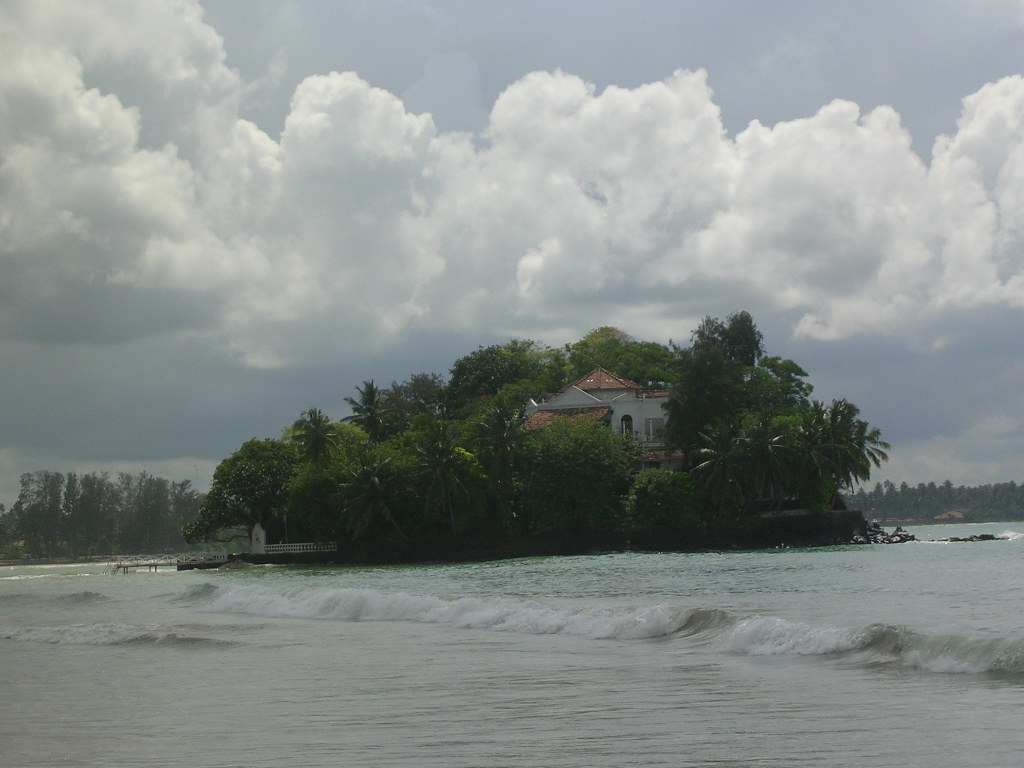
Taprobane Island in 2007, showing de Mauny's house

It was only after a long search for an earthly paradise that around 1925, de Mauny sighted "Galduwa" (meaning 'Rock Island' in Sinhalese), an islet in Weligama Bay, Ceylon, that was an unkempt wilderness used by locals as a dumping ground for cobras. It was purchased by de Mauny for Rs.250 and he renamed it "Taprobane", an ancient Greek name for Ceylon. He constructed a magnificent and picturesque villa that offered 360 degree views of the sea, and he replanted the island into his vision of a private Eden (the snakes, however, were removed). The villa, its furniture and garden were all designed by de Mauny to be in perfect harmony. He described himself as having "an insatiable thirst for beauty" and "longing for perfection."

Construction on the villa began in 1927. It featured a large domed octagonal central hall, called the Hall of the Lotus. This was lined with eight panels of inlaid wood dyed a dull gold and eau de Nil, and bearing a design of lotus buds and flowers. At the centre of the Hall was a large octagonal teak table, carved with lotus leaves. The furniture was teak and Ceylonese woods upholstered in eau de Nil watered silk, the iron and brass balustrades ornamented with peacocks, and the floors tiled in black and white marble inset with a rampant Sinhalese lion. There were no walls between rooms, only fabric scrims – the villa was designed as a completely open pavilion. De Mauny lived on the island with a village boy, Raman, who helped tend the gardens, and Gomez, his 'dressing boy'.

One journalist visitor wrote: "The man himself, the occupant of this dream home, remains to its visitors rather a mystery. They sum him up according to their own values in life. There are those who describe him as 'the made French Count who lives alone on his God-forsaken rock…Tiberius on Capri'. Others regard him with unconcealed envy and secret admiration for having so far left the world behind to gain the peace they sense in his home." Said de Mauny: "Mad? I am mad of course if to shape one's own life, to live it and love it is madness." De Mauny entertained a constant string of notable visitors, including Lord and Lady Mountbatten and David Herbert.

De Mauny established a furniture manufacturing business, 'Weligama Local Industries', and he collaborated with a Hungarian interior decorator, Mlle Louise Borgia, to make over the homes of the wealthy in Colombo. The business partnership and the furniture factory came to an end during the 1930s, in the wake of the Great Depression.

However, de Mauny went on to become a successful landscape and garden designer for many prominent homes in Colombo, authoring, as "Count de Mauny", The Gardens of Taprobane (dedicated to the Duchess of Sutherland) and Gardening in Ceylon.

Suffering from angina pectoris, de Mauny died of a heart attack in November 1941. Victor sold Taprobane Island in 1943 for Rs.1200. Lady Mary, aka the Countess de Mauny Talvande, died in 1947. Victor died in 1978 and his sister Alexandra in 1989. Neither of them left any issue.

The author Robin Maugham, who visited the island as a young man and in the mid-1970s, felt that the unique beauty and harmony of the villa had become compromised after de Mauny's death by partitioning and the loss of his furniture and fittings, and that the area itself had been despoiled by the construction of a new road along the mainland beach. Since then, and particularly after the 2004 tsunami, significant development of the adjoining mainland village has occurred.

== Works ==
- The Peace of Suffering 1914-1918, Grant and Richards, London, 1919.
- Gardening in Ceylon, H. W. Cave, 1921.
- The Gardens of Taprobane, Williams and Norgate, London, 1937.
