= Henry Byng, 4th Earl of Strafford =

British peer and courtier

The Right Honourable The Earl of Strafford KCVO CB
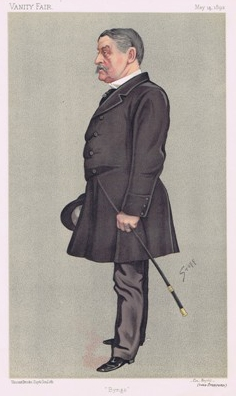
- "Byngo"; Byng as caricatured in Vanity Fair, May 1892

Equerry
- In office 1874–1899
- Preceded by: The Lord de Ros
- Succeeded by: John Brocklehurst

Groom-in-Waiting
- In office 1872–1874
- Preceded by: Henry Gardiner
- Succeeded by: John Campbell

Personal details
- Born: Henry William John Byng; 21 August 1831 London, England
- Died: 16 May 1899 (aged 67) Potters Bar, Middlesex, England
- Spouse(s): Countess Henrietta Danneskiold-Samsøe (m. 1863; died 1880) Cora Colgate (m. 1898)
- Children: 4

Military service
- Branch/service: British Army
- Rank: Supernumerary Major
- Unit: Coldstream Guards

Henry William John Byng, 4th Earl of Strafford KCVO CB (21 August 1831 – 16 May 1899) was a British peer and courtier.

== Biography ==
Byng was the second son of George Byng, 2nd Earl of Strafford and his first wife, Agnes. From 1840 he was a Page of Honour to Queen Victoria and in 1847 was commissioned into the Coldstream Guards as a lieutenant. In 1854, he was promoted to captain, by purchase, then later the same year was appointed an adjutant and in 1865 a supernumerary major. He retired as a lieutenant-colonel. On 15 June 1878 he took over from his elder brother as Honorary Colonel of the Edmonton Royal Rifle Regiment, a militia regiment that had also been commanded by their father.

In 1872, Byng was made a Groom-in-Waiting and then an Equerry two years later. In 1895, he was appointed a CB and knighted KCVO in 1897. On 28 March 1898, his elder brother George Byng, 3rd Earl of Strafford, died and he succeeded to his peerages and estates and his seat in the House of Lords.

Barely a year later, on 16 May 1899, Strafford was killed by an express train at Potters Bar railway station. Witnesses said he appeared to step in front of the approaching engine from the bottom of the slope at the end of the platform. His body was carried fifty yards down the track. A coroner's court was later told he had the nervous condition of catalepsy. The inquest jury – after considering several verdicts including suicide – returned a finding of death by misadventure.

As his sons predeceased him (Note: Eldest son George was drowned at sea in 1893 between Naples and Gibraltar from the RMS Ophir, second son John died the following year aged 23 in Paris of typhoid.) his peerages passed to his brother, Francis.

== Family ==
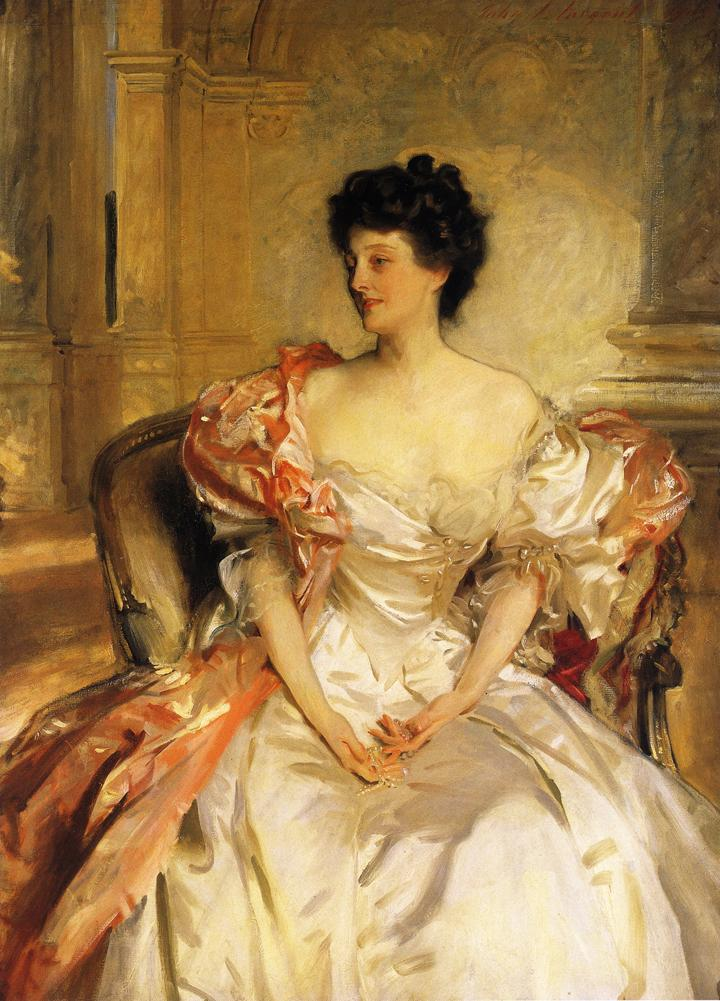
Cora, Countess of Strafford, by John Singer Sargent, 1908

On 15 October 1863, Strafford married Countess Henrietta Louisa Elizabeth Danneskiold-Samsøe (a maternal granddaughter of the 1st Marquess of Ailesbury) and they had four children:

- Lady Mary Elizabeth Agnes Byng (1864-1946), married Count Maurice de Mauny Talvande
- Lady Amy Frederica Alice Byng (1865–1961), married Sidney James Agar, 4th Earl of Normanton
- Hon. George Albert Edward Alexander Byng (1867–1893)
- Hon. John George Thomas Wentworth Byng (1870–1894)

His first wife died in 1880. On 6 December 1898, Strafford married American Cora Smith Colgate. Smith Colgate, a native of New Orleans, was the widow of Samuel James Colgate (1845–1893) – the grandson of industrialist William Colgate – who left her his entire estate, with an estimated value of $8 to 10 million (equivalent to $358,333,000 in 2025). Byng died only five months later.

Strafford was buried in a family vault in the churchyard of St John's, Potter's Bar, with his first wife. In 1935, after the church had become disused and prone to vandalism, the bodies were exhumed and moved to a mausoleum at the nearby family estate of Wrotham Park.

== Notes ==
Court offices
Preceded by George Cavendish	Page of Honour; 1840–1847	Succeeded by Alfred Crofton
Preceded by Henry Gardiner	Groom-in-Waiting; 1872–1874	Succeeded by John Campbell
Preceded by The Lord de Ros	Equerry; 1874–1899	Succeeded by John Brocklehurst
Peerage of the United Kingdom
Preceded by George Byng	Earl of Strafford; 1898–1899	Succeeded by Francis Byng
