= Earl of Normanton =

Title in the peerage of Ireland

Earldom of Normanton
- Arms: Azure, a Lion rampant Or. Crest: A Demi-Lion Or. Supporters: Dexter: A Lion per bend Or and Azure, collared and chained Gules, and charged on the shoulder with a Crescent; Sinister: A Lion per bend sinister Or and Azure, collared and chained Gules, and charged on the shoulder with a Crescent.
- Creation date: 4 February 1806
- Created by: George III
- Peerage: Peerage of Ireland
- First holder: Charles Agar, 1st Viscount Somerton
- Present holder: James Ellis Agar, 7th Earl of Normanton
- Heir apparent: Arthur Ellis Agar, Viscount Somerton
- Remainder to: The 1st Earl's heirs male of the body lawfully begotten
- Subsidiary titles: Viscount Somerton (I); Baron Somerton (UK); Baron Somerton (I); Baron Mendip (GB)
- Seat: Somerley House
- Motto: VIA TRITA VIA TUTA (The well-worn path is the safe path)

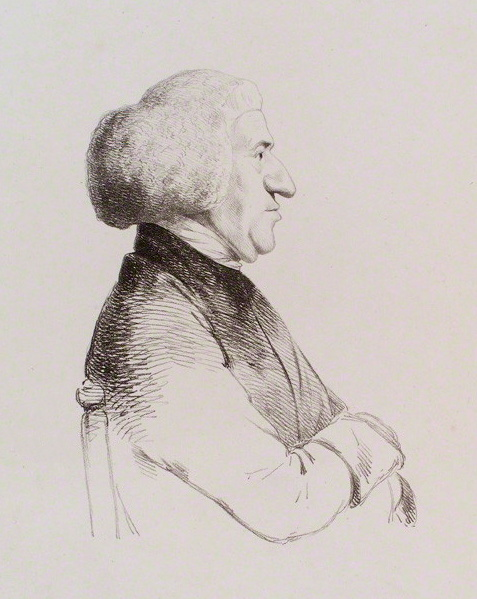
Charles Agar, 1st Earl of Normanton

Earl of Normanton is a title in the Peerage of Ireland. It was created in 1806 for Charles Agar, 1st Viscount Somerton, Archbishop of Dublin. He had already been created Baron Somerton, of Somerton in the County of Kilkenny, in 1795 and Viscount Somerton, of Somerton in the County of Kilkenny, in 1800, also in the Peerage of Ireland. Lord Normanton sat in the House of Lords from 1800 to 1809 as one of the 28 original Irish representative peers.

His grandson, the third Earl, represented Wilton in Parliament from 1841 to 1852. In 1873, he was created Baron Somerton, of Somerley in the County of Southampton, in the Peerage of the United Kingdom. This peerage gave the Earls a seat in the House of Lords. As of 2019, the titles are held by the third Earl's great-great-grandson, the seventh Earl, who succeeded his father in that year.

The first Earl of Normanton was the younger brother of James Agar, 1st Viscount Clifden and the nephew of the politician Welbore Ellis. The latter was in 1794 created Baron Mendip, of Mendip in the County of Somerset with remainder to his nephews Lord Clifden, the future Lord Normanton and a younger brother. On Lord Mendip's death in 1802, the barony passed according to the special remainder to his great-nephew the second Viscount Clifden. The titles remained united until 1974, when the Viscountcy of Clifden became extinct. However, the barony of Mendip survived, and was inherited by the sixth Earl of Normanton, who became the ninth Baron Mendip as well.

The family seat is Somerley House, near Ringwood, Hampshire.

== Earls of Normanton (1806) ==
- Charles Agar, 1st Earl of Normanton (1736–1809), Archbishop of Dublin
- Welbore Ellis Agar, 2nd Earl of Normanton (1778–1868)
- James Charles Herbert Welbore Ellis Agar, 3rd Earl of Normanton (1818–1896)
- Sidney James Agar, 4th Earl of Normanton (1865–1933)
- Edward John Sidney Christian Welbore Ellis Agar, 5th Earl of Normanton (1910–1967)
- Shaun James Christian Welbore Ellis Agar, 6th Earl of Normanton (1945–2019)
- James Shaun Christian Welbore Ellis Agar, 7th Earl of Normanton (b. 1982) who, through his marriage to Lady Lucy Alexander is a son-in-law of Earl Alexander of Tunis.

The heir apparent is the present holder's eldest son Arthur Alexander Christian Welbore Ellis Agar, Viscount Somerton (b. 2016).

== See also ==
- Viscount Clifden
- Baron Mendip
- Countess of Brandon
