= Somerley =

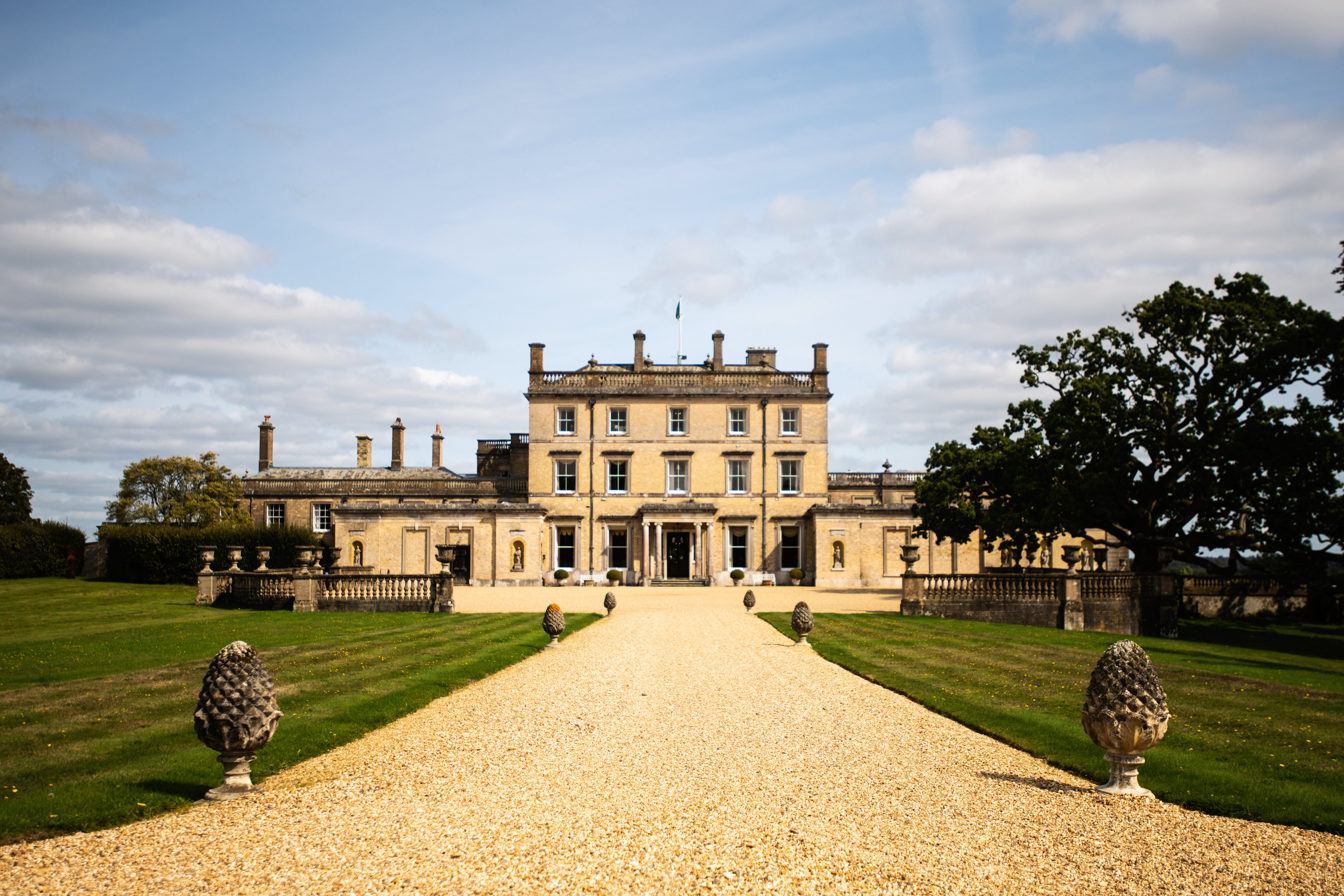
- Somerley House, photographed by Robin Goodlad

- Location within Hampshire

General information
- Location: Ellingham, Harbridge and Ibsley, United Kingdom
- Coordinates: 50.8714°N 1.8060°W
- Completed: c. 1795
- Owner: Earl of Normanton

Design and construction
- Architect: Samuel Wyatt
- Designations: Grade II* listed

Website
- https://somerley.com/

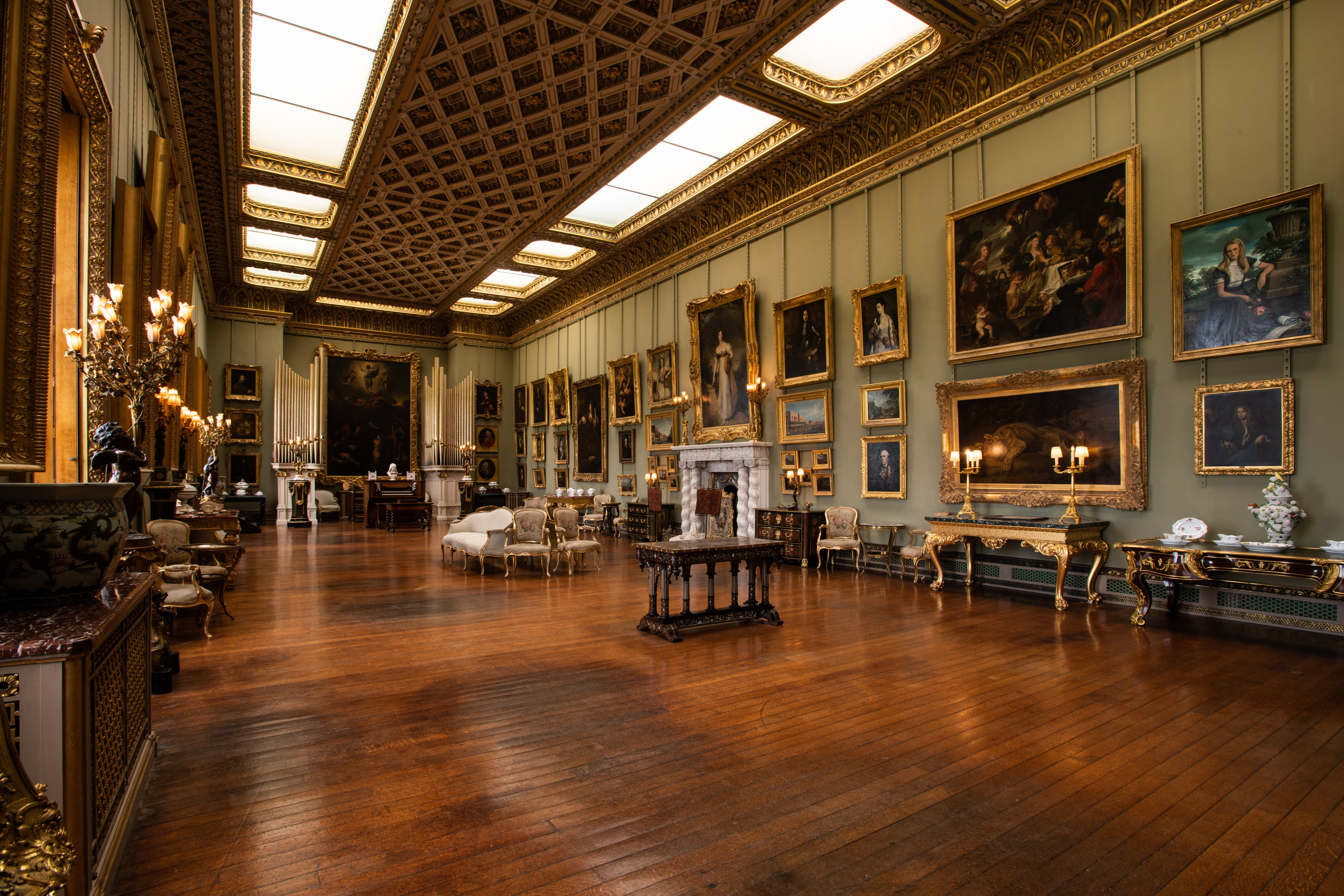
Somerley, photographed by Robin Goodlad

Somerley is a large Georgian Grade II* listed English country house that is situated in the civil parish of Ellingham and Harbridge with Ibsley in the New Forest district in Hampshire, England. It is 2 miles (3 km) west of the New Forest National Park. The nearest town is Ringwood, which lies approximately 2.5 miles (4 km) south-east from the House, just east of the River Avon.

Somerley House is perched overlooking the Estate. The River Avon meanders through this vast 7,000 acre Somerley Estate, providing a wildlife rich environment for a diverse range of habitats including; parkland, water meadows and woodland. The Estate features a walled garden and an ancient woodland.

The house is the home of the seventh Earl of Normanton. It was designed by English architect Samuel Wyatt in 1792–1795, and the house became the property of Lord Normanton's family in 1825. In 1850 a 90ft picture gallery was added to house the family's paintings and collections; today this space is used for events. It is not open to the public although it is available for weddings, filming, and corporate and private event hire.

The house was a filming location for the 1983 TV adaptation of Mansfield Park and more recently portrayed Highgrove House in the Netflix series, The Crown. In addition, Somerley served as a filming location for the first season of the TV show Bridgerton. It has served as a film location for BBC programmes including Miss Marple (Gossington Hall), with Joan Hickson and Howard’s Way. It also served as a filming location for the Amazon Prime Video original Red, White & Royal Blue.

Somerley Park is home to a golf club.
