= John Hickey =

John Hickey may refer to:

- Jack Hickey (rugby) (1887–1950), Australian rugby union player
- John J. Hickey (1911–1970), American politician who served as a United States Senator from Wyoming
- John Hickey (Canadian politician) (1950s–2017), Canadian politician serving in the Newfoundland and Labrador House of Assembly
- Jack Hickey (Australian rules footballer) (1930–2018), Australian rules footballer for Collingwood
- John Hickey (administrator) (1920–2009), Collingwood club president
- John Benjamin Hickey (born 1963), American actor
- John Hickey (sculptor) (1756–1795), Irish sculptor
- John Hickey (Missouri politician) (born 1965), American politician
- John Hickey (Archdeacon of Emly) (1661–1723)

== See also ==
- Jack Hickey (disambiguation)
