= James Agar, 1st Viscount Clifden =

Irish peer and politician (1734–1789)

James Agar, 1st Viscount Clifden (25 March 1734 – 1 January 1789), was an Irish peer and politician and held the office of one of the joint Postmasters General of Ireland.

== Family ==
He was the second son of Henry Agar, a former MP for Gowran, and Anne Ellis, daughter of Welbore Ellis, Bishop of Meath, and was probably born at Gowran Castle on 25 March 1734. On 20 March 1760, James married Lucia Martin, daughter of John Martin and widow of Henry Boyle-Walsingham. Together they had three children; Henry-Welbore, John Ellis, b. 31 December 1763, and Charles-Bagnell, b. 13 August 1765. Agar was made a Baron Clifden on 27 July 1776 and Viscount Clifden on 12 January 1781. He died on 1 January 1789 when his eldest son became the second viscount and Baron Mendip. His widow died in 1802. Agar's younger brothers were Charles Agar, first Earl of Normanton (1736–1809), who became the Church of Ireland Archbishop of Dublin, and Welbore Ellis Agar, a notable art collector.

== Politics ==
In addition to being a Member of Parliament (MP) for Gowran, for which he sat three times, from 1753 to 1761, again from 1768 to 1769 and finally from 1776 to 1777, he controlled three other borough seats through the strength of his family holdings. Between 1761 and 1776, he represented County Kilkenny and between 1768 and 1769 Thomastown. He held the post of joint Postmaster General of Ireland between 1784 and 1789 with William Ponsonby, 1st Baron Ponsonby.

Parliament of Ireland
Preceded by James Agar; David Chaigneau	Member of Parliament for Gowran; 1753–1761; With: James Agar	Succeeded by George Dunbar; William Henry Burton
Preceded by Henry Flood; Patrick Wemys	Member of Parliament for County Kilkenny; 1761–1776; With: Hon. John Ponsonby	Succeeded by Hon. John Ponsonby; Hon. Edmund Butler
Preceded by George Dunbar; William Henry Burton	Member of Parliament for Gowran; 1768–1769; With: Hon. John Ponsonby	Succeeded by Arthur Browne; Henry Prittie
Preceded by Lord Frederick Campbell; Thomas Eyre	Member of Parliament for Thomastown; 1768–1769; With: Thomas Maunsell	Succeeded by George Dunbar; Thomas Maunsell
Preceded by Arthur Browne; Henry Prittie	Member of Parliament for Gowran; 1776–1777; With: John Butler	Succeeded by Sir Boyle Roche, 1st Bt; John Butler
Peerage of Ireland
New creation	Viscount Clifden; 1781–1788	Succeeded by Henry Ellis
New creation	Baron Clifden; 1776–1788	Succeeded by Henry Ellis
