= Warden Flood =

Irish judge

Warden Flood (1694 – 16 April 1764) was an Irish judge who held office as Lord Chief Justice of Ireland, but is mainly remembered now as the natural father of the statesman Henry Flood.

He was born at Burnchurch in County Kilkenny, son of Francis Flood and Anne Warden. He was educated at Kilkenny College and Trinity College Dublin, taking his degree of Bachelor of Arts in 1714. He entered Middle Temple in 1716 and was called to the Irish Bar in 1720.

He was appointed Solicitor-General for Ireland in 1741, Attorney-General for Ireland in 1751, and in 1760 was appointed Chief Justice of the King's Bench for Ireland. He acted as a judge of assize and was briefly Speaker of the Irish House of Lords. He became the Member of Parliament (MP) for Callan in 1727. He had a townhouse at Cuffe Street in Dublin and a country house at Farmley in Kilkenny.

His nephew, also Warden Flood, was MP for Longford Borough, Baltinglass, Carysfort, and Taghmon.

He had several children by Isabella Whiteside, but whether the couple were legally married is doubtful. His most famous child, the statesman Henry Flood, who is thought to have been Isabella's son, was generally believed to have been born out of wedlock.

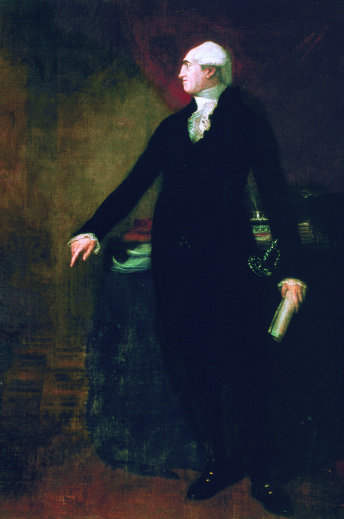
Henry Flood, natural son of Warden Flood

Parliament of Ireland
Preceded by Francis Flood; James Agar	Member of Parliament for Callan; 1727–1760; With: Henry Wemys 1727–1751; James Wemys1751–1760	Succeeded by James Agar; Patrick Wemys
Legal offices
Preceded by St George Caulfeild	Solicitor-General for Ireland; 1741–1751	Succeeded by Philip Tisdall
Preceded by St George Caulfeild	Attorney-General for Ireland; 1751–1760	Succeeded by Philip Tisdall
Preceded by St George Caulfeild	Lord Chief Justice of the King's Bench for Ireland; 1760–1764	Succeeded by John Gore
