= Garrett Wall =

18th century Irish Anglican priest

Garett Wall (1750–1820) was an Irish Anglican priest.

Wall was educated at Trinity College, Dublin. He was the incumbent at Ballyroan from 1813 to 1818, and of Ardbraccan from then until 1823. In He held incumbencies at Templebredon and Pallasgreen. In 1772 he became Treasurer of Cashel; and in 1788 Archdeacon of Emly, a post he held until his death in November 1820.

Church of Ireland titles
Preceded by Charles Agar	Archdeacon of Emly; 1788–1820	Succeeded by John Jebb
