= Gowran (Parliament of Ireland constituency) =

Pre-1801 Irish constituency

- Former borough constituency for the Irish House of Commons
- County: County Kilkenny
- Borough: Gowran

1609–1801
- Seats: 2
- Replaced by: Disfranchised

Gowran was a constituency represented in the Irish House of Commons until 1801.

== History ==
In the Patriot Parliament of 1689 summoned by James II, Gowran was represented with two members.

== Members of Parliament, 1609–1801 ==
- 1613–1615 John Swayne and Thomas Stanton
- 1634–1635 John Hackett and James Kealy
- 1639–1649 Sir Patrick Wemyss and Peter Butler (Butler resigned and replaced 1641 by Piers Crosbie)
- 1661–1666 William Warden of Burnchurch and John Powell

=== 1689–1801 ===
Election	First MP	Second MP
1689	Richard Butler	Walter Kelly
1689	Richard Butler	Robert Fielding
1692	Sir Charles Meredyth	George Warburton
1695	Edward May	Joseph Stepney
1703	Patrick Wemyss	Robert Maude (Note: Created a baronet in 1705)
November 1713	Sir Richard Levinge, 1st Bt (Note: Also elected for Kilkenny City in 1713, for which he chose to sit)	James Agar (Note: Also elected for Callan in 1715, for which he chose to sit)
1713	Patrick Wemyss	James Agar
November 1715	John Pepper	James Agar
1715	John Pepper	David Chaigneau
1725	William Martin	David Chaigneau
1727	Henry Agar	David Chaigneau
1747	James Agar	David Chaigneau
1753	James Agar	James Agar
1761	George Dunbar	William Henry Burton
1768	Hon. John Ponsonby (Note: Also elected for County Kilkenny in 1768, for which he chose to sit.)	James Agar
1769	Arthur Browne	Henry Prittie
1776	James Agar	John Butler
1777	Sir Boyle Roche, 1st Bt	John Butler
October 1783	Hon. Henry Welbore Agar (Note: Also elected for County Kilkenny in 1783, for which he chose to sit.)	George Dunbar
1783	George Burdett	George Dunbar
1790	Patrick Welch	George Dunbar
1798	George Bunbury	George Burdett
1800	Henry Verney Lovett Darby	George Burdett
1801	Constituency disenfranchised	

== Bibliography ==
- O'Hart, John (2007). The Irish and Anglo-Irish Landed Gentry: When Cromwell came to Ireland. Vol. II. Heritage Books. ISBN 978-0-7884-1927-0.
- Leigh Rayment's historical List of Members of the Irish House of Commons. Cites: Johnston-Liik, Edith Mary (2002). The History of the Irish Parliament 1692-1800 (6 volumes). Ulster Historical Foundation.
