= Ellis Bermingham, Countess of Brandon =

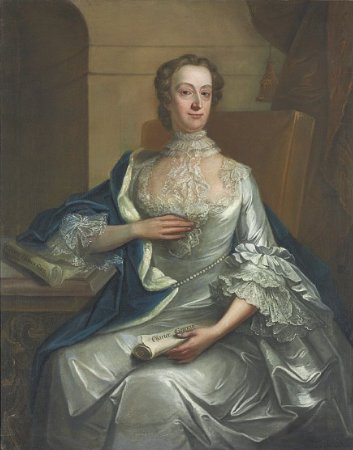
The Countess of Brandon holding the Charters of Gowran and Thomastown. By Philip Hussey.

Ellis Bermingham (1708–1789) was born in 1708 as Ellis (Elizabeth) Agar, eldest daughter of James Agar MP of Gowran Castle, County Kilkenny and his second wife Mary Wemyss. She married, first (1726), Theobald Bourke, 7th Viscount Mayo, and after his death in 1742 married secondly (1745) Francis Bermingham, 14th Baron Athenry (1692–1750). She had no issue by either marriage.

In 1758 Ellis Bermingham was granted (for life only) the title "Countess of Brandon, in the County of Kilkenny", a title in the Peerage of Ireland. The title became extinct on her death on 11 March 1789.

The Right Reverend Charles Agar, 1st Earl of Normanton, Archbishop of Dublin, was Lady Brandon's nephew.

== Countesses of Brandon (1758) ==
- Ellis Bermingham, Countess of Brandon (1708–1789)

== See also ==
- Viscount Mayo
- Baron Athenry
- Earl of Normanton

Peerage of Ireland
New creation	Countess of Brandon; 1758–1789	Title for life only
