= Jack Hickey =

Jack Hickey may refer to:

- Jack Hickey (rugby) (1887–1950), Australian rugby footballer
- Jack Hickey (Australian rules footballer) (born 1930)
- Jack Hickey (baseball) (1881–1941), Major League Baseball pitcher

== See also ==
- John Hickey (disambiguation)
