= Henry Penton (the younger) =

British politician (1736–1812)

Henry Penton (1736–1812) was a British politician who sat in the House of Commons for 35 years from 1761 to 1796. As the developer of his estate in North London, he became the founder of Pentonville.

== Early life ==
Penton was born on 11 December 1736, the son of Henry Penton of Eastgate House in Winchester and his wife Miss Simondi, daughter of the Swedish consul at Lisbon. He was educated at Winchester College in 1748 and was admitted at Clare College, Cambridge on 13 November 1753. He subsequently undertook a Grand Tour

== Political career ==
In the 1761 general election Penton was returned unopposed as Member of Parliament for Winchester, which his father had represented since 1747. He was appointed King's letter carrier in 1761, a position he held until his death. His father died in 1762 and left him Eastgate House and his estate which included a large area in the north of London. Also on 27 November 1762, he entered Lincoln's Inn. He married Anne Knowler, daughter of John Knowler of Canterbury, Kent on 3 January 1765.

Penton was returned for Winchester again in 1768 and 1774 when his career was at its zenith. In December 1774 he was appointed Lord of the Admiralty. In 1778 he entertained George III and Queen Charlotte for two nights at Eastgate House on their visit to Winchester. He was also Recorder of Winchester in 1778. He was returned as MP for Winchester again in 1780. He spoke occasionally in Parliament and made 21 speeches between 1770 and 1782, most of them after 1774 on Admiralty business. However he was replaced at the Admiralty in April 1782 and his domestic circumstances were troubled at this time as his wife left him when she discovered his relationship with her maid. In December 1783 it was reported "Mr. Penton feels himself neglected and hurt ….. but he had formerly a wish to quit Parliament. The seat, therefore, might perhaps be got". His behaviour was becoming less reliable in parliament and he lived for many years in a comparatively secluded state. However he was returned for Winchester again in 1784 and was Recorder again in 1785. The political fixers were anxious to take hold of the seat in which he had an interest. He was returned again at Winchester in 1790. In January 1796 he had expressed a wish to retire and Portland recommended Viscount Palmerston to him as meeting every requirement except ‘consanguinity’. Penton agreed and gave his health as his reason for retirement at the 1796 general election. He subsequently sold Eastgate House and estate to Sir Henry Paulet St. John Mildmay.

== Pentonville ==
Penton owned an area of open countryside adjacent to the New Road in North London and developed a number of streets there in the 1770s. In addition to Penton Street he marked his Admiralty connection by naming a new street after Admiral Rodney. The area acquired the name of Pentonville and remained in the family for many years.

== Personal life ==
Penton acquired social stigma from his liaison with his wife's maid Catherine Judd of Stratford-on-Avon. His wife left him in the 1780s, having discovered the affair. He began living with Catherine, setting her up in a new house in Piccadilly. He took her to Italy, and had her taught music and languages. It was said that she had a fine voice and she sang excellently. Penton claimed an offer was made to her at Rome of £1,500 a year if she would appear upon the Italian stage. Property in Penton Street was used to secure an independent annuity for her. Five days after the death of his wife, he married Catherine, on 8 April 1808. She was already the mother of his heir Henry Penton and two daughters.

Penton died at Wimpole Street on 15 January 1812. After his death Catherine married Richard Earle Welby, the son of Sir William Earle Welby, 1st Baronet.

== Sources ==
Parliament of Great Britain
Preceded by James Brydges; Henry Penton	Member of Parliament for Winchester; 1761–1796; With: Lord Harry Powlett 1761–1765; George Paulet 1765–1774; Lovell Stanhope 1774–1783; Henry Flood 1783–1784; Richard Grace Gamon 1784–1796	Succeeded by Viscount Palmerston; Richard Grace Gamon
