= George Agar, 1st Baron Callan =

Irish politician

George Agar, 1st Baron Callan PC (4 December 1751 – 29 October 1815) was an Anglo-Irish politician and peer.

Agar was the third son of James Agar, of County Kilkenny, by the Honourable Rebecca Flower, daughter of William Flower, 1st Baron Castle Durrow and Edith Caulfeild. Ellis Bermingham, Countess of Brandon, was his aunt. His father was killed in a duel with Henry Flood in 1769, the culmination of a long and bitter political feud. He was educated at Eton and Trinity Hall, Cambridge.

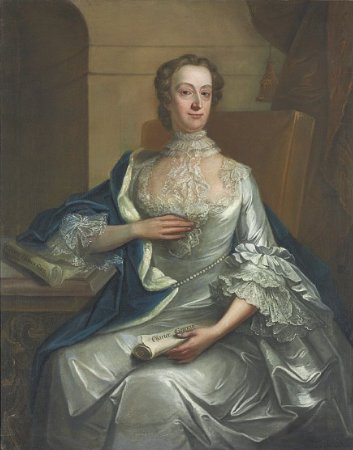
Lord Callan's aunt, Elizabeth (Ellis), Countess of Brandon

Agar was returned to the Irish House of Commons for Callan in 1776, a seat he held until 1790, and was admitted to the Irish Privy Council in 1789. In 1790 he was elevated to the Peerage of Ireland as Baron Callan, of Callan in the County of Kilkenny. In 1801 he was elected as one of the original 28 Irish representative peers to sit in the House of Lords.

Lord Callan never married and the title became extinct on his death in October 1815, aged 63.

Parliament of Ireland
Preceded by Henry Flood; Hercules Langrishe	Member of Parliament for Callan; 1777–1790; With: Pierce Butler 1777–1783; John Bourke O'Flaherty 1783–1790	Succeeded by William Meeke; Nathaniel Warren
Parliament of the United Kingdom
New post	Representative peer for Ireland; 1800–1815	Succeeded by The Marquess of Thomond
Peerage of Ireland
New creation	Baron Callan; 1790–1815	Extinct
