= Henry Darby =

Henry Darby may refer to:

- Sir Henry D'Esterre Darby (1749–1823), officer in the Royal Navy
- Henry Darby (politician), Irish politician

== See also ==
- Harry Darby (1895–1987), American politician from Kansas
- Harry Darby (wrestler) (1902–?), British wrestler
