= John Le Hunte =

John Le Hunte (1658–1697) was an Anglican priest.

Le Hunte was born in County Tipperary and educated at Trinity College, Dublin. He was Chancellor of Cashel Cathedral and Archdeacon of Emly from 1682 until his death.

Church of Ireland titles
Preceded by William Hamilton	Archdeacon of Emly; 1697–1724	Succeeded by John Hickey
