= Henry Ellis, 2nd Viscount Clifden =

Irish politician

Henry Welbore Agar-Ellis, 2nd Viscount Clifden SA (22 January 1761 – 13 July 1836), styled The Honourable Henry Agar between 1776 and 1789, was an Irish politician.

== Background ==
Born Henry Welbore Agar at Gowran Castle, Gowran, Co. Kilkenny, Ireland, he was the eldest son of James Agar, 1st Viscount Clifden, son of Henry Agar and Anne, daughter of Welbore Ellis, Bishop of Meath, and sister of Welbore Ellis, 1st Baron Mendip. His mother was Lucia, daughter of Colonel John Martin, of Dublin. He was the nephew of Charles Agar, 1st Earl of Normanton.

== Political career ==
Agar was returned to the Irish House of Commons for both Gowran and County Kilkenny in 1783, but chose to sit for the latter, a seat he held until 1789, when he succeeded his father in the Irish viscountcy and entered the Irish House of Lords. In 1785 he became the final sinecure holder of the office of Clerk of the Irish Privy Council, which title after his death was given to his deputies. In 1793 he was elected to the British House of Commons as one of two representatives for Heytesbury. He succeeded his great-uncle Lord Mendip as second Baron Mendip in 1802 according to a special remainder in the letters patent. This was an English peerage and forced him to resign from the House of Commons and enter the House of Lords. Two years later he assumed by Royal licence the surname of Ellis in lieu of Agar.

== Family ==
Lord Clifden married Lady Caroline, daughter of George Spencer, 4th Duke of Marlborough, in 1792. His only son George became a successful politician and was created Baron Dover in his father's lifetime, but predeceased his father. Lady Clifden died at Blenheim Palace in November 1813, aged 50. Lord Clifden remained a widower until his death at Hanover Square, Mayfair, London, in July 1836, aged 75. He was succeeded in his titles by his grandson Henry, the eldest son of Lord Dover.

Parliament of Ireland
| Preceded by Hon. John Ponsonby; Joseph Deane | Member of Parliament for County Kilkenny; 1783–1789; With: William Ponsonby | Succeeded by William Ponsonby; Walter Butler |
| Preceded by John Butler; Sir Boyle Roche, Bt | Member of Parliament for Gowran; 1783; With: George Dunbar | Succeeded by George Dunbar; George Burdett |
Parliament of Great Britain
| Preceded by The Lord Auckland; Charles Ellis | Member of Parliament for Heytesbury; 1793–1801; With: Charles Ellis 1793–1796; Sir John Leicester, Bt 1796–1801 | Succeeded by Parliament of the United Kingdom |
Parliament of the United Kingdom
| Preceded by Parliament of Great Britain | Member of Parliament for Heytesbury; 1801–1802; With: Sir John Leicester, Bt | Succeeded by Sir John Leicester, Bt; William Wickham |
Peerage of Ireland
| Preceded by James Agar | Viscount Clifden; 1789–1836 | Succeeded by Henry Agar-Ellis |
Peerage of Great Britain
| Preceded by Welbore Ellis | Baron Mendip; 1802–1836 | Succeeded by Henry Agar-Ellis |
