= Surplice (horse) =

British-bred Thoroughbred racehorse

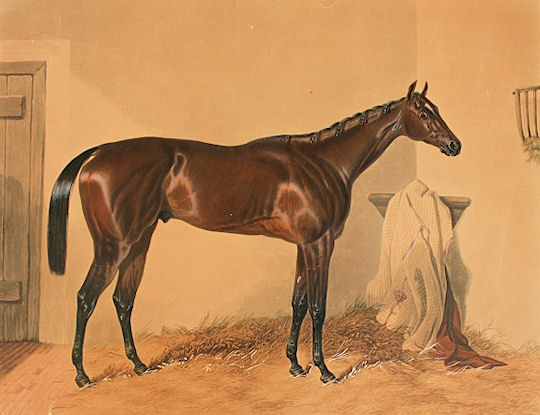
- Surplice. Etching by Charles Hunt after a painting by Harry Hall.
- Sire: Touchstone
- Grandsire: Camel
- Dam: Crucifix
- Damsire: Priam
- Sex: Stallion
- Foaled: 21 January 1845
- Country: United Kingdom of Great Britain and Ireland
- Colour: Bay
- Breeder: Lord George Bentinck
- Owner: Lord George Bentinck; Edward Lloyd-Mostyn; Lord Clifden
- Trainer: John Kent; Robert Stephenson.
- Record: 14:9-2-1

Major wins
- Epsom Derby (1848); St. Leger Stakes (1848)

Surplice (1845–1871) was a British Thoroughbred racehorse and sire. In a career that lasted from July 1847 to October 1849 he ran thirteen times and won nine races. He was the leading colt of his generation in England at both two and three years old, with his wins including The Derby and the St Leger in 1848: he was the first horse for forty-eight years to win both of these Classics. His later career was less successful and he was retired to stud in 1850. Surplice had limited success as a sire of winners and died in 1871.

== Background ==
Surplice was a dark bay horse with a small white star standing 16.1 hands high, making him an unusually large Thoroughbred for his time. He was bred by Lord George Bentinck, the dominant figure in British horse-racing of his era. In 1846, Bentinck decided to concentrate on his political affairs and sold all his racing interests, including the yearling Surplice, to Edward Lloyd-Mostyn for £10,000. A condition of the deal was that Surplice should remain with his trainer John Kent at Goodwood. Later that year Mostyn sold Surplice to Lord Clifden.

Surplice's sire, Touchstone, won the St Leger and two Ascot Gold Cups, before going on to be an outstandingly successful stallion. Apart from Surplice, his classic winners included Cotherstone, Orlando and Newminster and he was Champion sire on four occasions. Surplice's dam, Crucifix, was an undefeated racemare who won the 1000 Guineas, 2000 Guineas and Epsom Oaks in 1840.

== Racing career ==
=== 1847: two-year-old season ===
Surplice began his racing career in July 1847 at Goodwood when he ran in the Ham Stakes. He was made the 4/7 favourite and the result was never in doubt as he led from the start and won easily by two lengths from Liston. Immediately after the race the bookmakers offered odds of only 10/1 against him for the following year's Epsom Derby. He followed up in the Produce Stakes at the same meeting, starting at odds of 1/3 and winning by three lengths in a race which was described as "all one way".

In September he was sent to Doncaster, where he won the Municipal Stakes. At Newmarket in October, he was allowed a walkover in the Buckenham Stakes, when no horse appeared to oppose him. His earnings of £5,550 were the highest for any British two-year-old that season and his performances were sufficient to send him into the winter break regarded as the leading contender for the following year's Derby.

=== 1848: three-year-old season ===
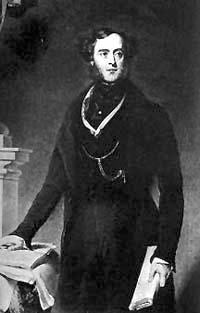
Lord George Bentinck: his sale of Surplice cost him the "Blue Ribbon".

Surplice maintained his position as Derby favourite in early 1848, despite a series of negative rumours which seemed to originate from Lord Clifden's racing manager, Francis Villiers who had a strong financial interest in his stable companion, Loadstone.

Surplice made his first appearance of the season in the Derby at Epsom. He started the even-money favourite in a field of seventeen runners. Ridden by Sim Templeman, he was settled in fifth place before moving up to turn into the straight in third place. Two furlongs from the finish Templeman sent Surplice into the lead, where he looked to be going well, but was soon challenged by Shylock. Surplice successfully turned back the challenge but had to be ridden hard to hold the late run of Springy Jack and win by a neck. After the race Benjamin Disraeli was attempting to console Lord George Bentinck who was downhearted at having sold the horse who had won the Derby. When Bentinck told Disraeli that a man not involved in racing could not possibly understand the significance of the race Disraeli replied that he knew perfectly well that the Derby was "the Blue Ribbon of the Turf".

At Goodwood in July, Surplice ran twice but appeared to be completely unsuited by the soft ground and was beaten in both his races. On the Tuesday of the meeting he finished second to Distaffina in the Gratwicke Stakes over one and a half miles and two days later he finished third to Glendower in the one mile Racing Stakes. Surplice had been odds-on favourite for both races. He was then transferred to the stable of Robert Stephenson.

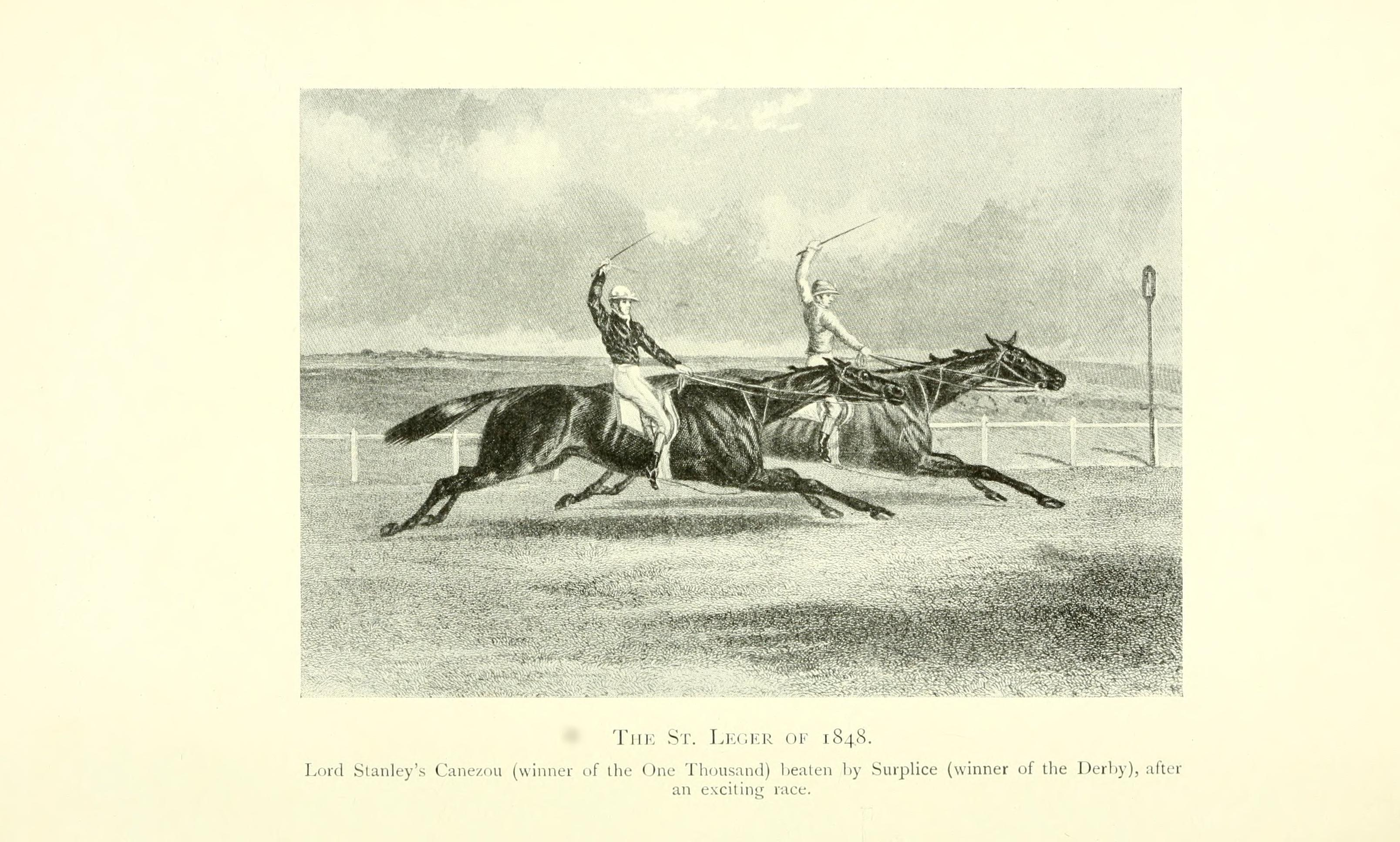
The St. Leger of 1848 Lord Stanley's Canezou (winner of the One Thaousand) beaten by Surplice (winner of the Derby), after an exciting race.

At Doncaster in September he started at odds 9/4 in a nine-runner field for the St Leger, with the filly Canezou starting favourite. The race was delayed by a badly managed false start, which resulted in most of the runners racing for almost a furlong before being successfully recalled. Ridden by Nat Flatman, a late replacement for Jem Robinson, Surplice raced prominently and moved up to challenge the leader Flatcatcher early in the straight. He briefly took the lead, only to be headed by Canezou, but Flatman rode a strong finish and Surplice regained the lead in the closing stages to win by a neck. The finish was described as being a "most exciting" one, although it was noted that, as at Epsom, Surplice was given an extremely hard race, with Flatman making liberal use of his whip and spurs, and after the race he was reported to be in a "distressed" condition. He was the first Derby winner to take the St Leger since Champion in 1800. Two days after his win in the St Leger, Surplice walked over in the North of England Stakes.

On 26 September, Surplice appeared at Newmarket and won the ten furlong Grand Duke Michael Stakes from Flatcatcher. As a result of his strong autumn form, Surplice was made 3/1 favourite for the Cesarewitch Handicap two weeks later, despite the unfavourably soft ground, but finished unplaced behind The Cur. Surplice was entered for two other races at Newmarket in the autumn of 1848, but his entries for these races were rendered void by the death of in September of his breeder Lord George Bentinck who had made the original nominations.

Surplice's earnings for the 1848 season totaled £10,475, the highest for any British horse for five years.

=== 1849: four-year-old season ===
Surplice's first run as a four-year-old was intended to be a match race at Newmarket in April in which he was scheduled to concede 35 pounds to Lord Exeter's filly Tophana, but he failed to appear and his owner paid a forfeit. His first actual appearance was delayed until 3 August when he finished sixth when 6/4 favourite for the Chesterfield Cup at Goodwood.

In autumn there were reports of a "great match race" to be run between Surplice, Van Tromp and Justice for Ireland at Newmarket in October. The "match" never came to fruition, as Surplice's two rivals were withdrawn and he walked over for the £1,000 prize. Later that month he failed to appear for a match race at Newmarket in which he was set to receive sixteen pounds from the six-year-old Royal Hunt Cup winner Collingwood.

=== 1850: five-year-old season ===
Surplice made one recorded appearance as a five-year-old in 1850. At Newmarket on 29 April he was "easily" beaten in a match race over a sprint distance in which he attempted to concede nineteen pounds to a filly called St Rosalia.

== Stud career ==
Surplice began his stud career at the Turf Tavern at Doncaster at a fee of 25 guineas. He was not a success as a sire, with his offspring being characterised by R. H. Copperthwaite in his book "The Turf and the Racehorse" as being "tall, leggy, unwieldy and top-heavy". He did however, get the Poule d'Essai des Poulains winner Florin and he was the damsire of the 2000 Guineas winner Prince Charlie. After his death in 1871 at Woodbridge, Suffolk his cannon bones were made into handles for a pair of carving knives.

== Sire line tree ==
- Surplice
  - Florin
    - Florentin

== Pedigree ==
Pedigree of Surplice (GB), bay stallion, 1845
Sire Touchstone (GB) 1831	Camel; 1822	Whalebone	Waxy
Sire Touchstone (GB) 1831	Camel; 1822	Whalebone	Penelope
Sire Touchstone (GB) 1831	Camel; 1822	Selim mare	Selim
Sire Touchstone (GB) 1831	Camel; 1822	Selim mare	Maiden
Sire Touchstone (GB) 1831	Banter; 1826	Master Henry	Orville*
Sire Touchstone (GB) 1831	Banter; 1826	Master Henry	Miss Sophia
Sire Touchstone (GB) 1831	Banter; 1826	Boadicea	Alexander
Sire Touchstone (GB) 1831	Banter; 1826	Boadicea	Brunette
Dam Crucifix (GB) 1837	Priam; 1827	Emilius	Orville*
Dam Crucifix (GB) 1837	Priam; 1827	Emilius	Emily
Dam Crucifix (GB) 1837	Priam; 1827	Cressida	Whiskey
Dam Crucifix (GB) 1837	Priam; 1827	Cressida	Young Giantess
Dam Crucifix (GB) 1837	Octaviana; 1815	Octavian	Stripling
Dam Crucifix (GB) 1837	Octaviana; 1815	Octavian	Oberon mare
Dam Crucifix (GB) 1837	Octaviana; 1815	Shuttle mare	Shuttle mare
Dam Crucifix (GB) 1837	Octaviana; 1815	Shuttle mare	Zara (Family:2-i)

* Surplice is inbred 4S x 4D to the stallion Orville, meaning that he appears fourth generation on the sire side of his pedigree, and fourth generation on the dam side of his pedigree.
