= Henry Agar =

Irish politician

Henry Agar (1707–1746) was an Irish politician, and the father of the 1st Viscount Clifden and the 1st Earl of Normanton.

Agar was the eldest son of James Agar of Gowran Castle and his second wife Mary Wemyss, daughter of Sir Henry Wemyss of Danesfort. He was educated at Trinity College, Dublin. From 1727 to 1746, he was MP for Gowran in County Kilkenny.

He married Anne Ellis, daughter of Welbore Ellis, Bishop of Meath and Diana Briscoe, and sister of Welbore Ellis, 1st Baron Mendip. They were the parents of five sons, including James Agar, 1st Viscount Clifden, Charles Agar, 1st Earl of Normanton, Archbishop of Dublin, and Welbore Ellis Agar, a notable art collector.

Agar extensively rebuilt Gowran Castle and also acquired substantial interests in Dublin by marriage. He died in 1746: his widow remarried George Dunbar of County Fermanagh. She died in 1761.

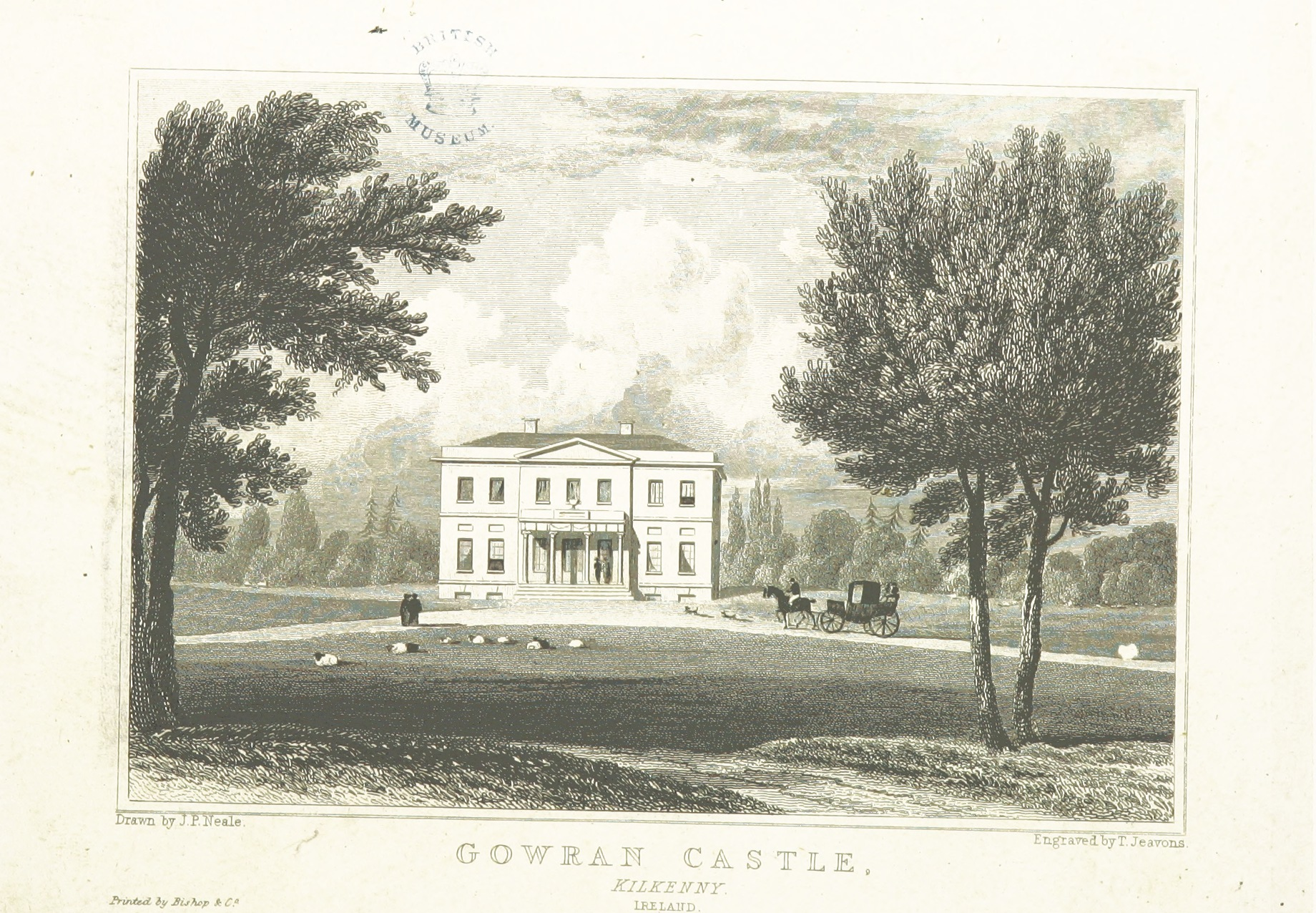
Gowran Castle, early 19th century

Political control of the town of Callan, as well as the parliamentary seat of Gowran, passed to Henry's brother James Agar. This led to a bitter feud with the rival Flood faction, whose leader Henry Flood killed James in a duel in 1769.
