= Michael Stanhope (priest) =

English priest (1681–1737)

Michael Stanhope DD (1681-1737) was a Canon of Windsor from 1730 to 1737.

== Early life ==
Stanhope was educated at Corpus Christi College, Cambridge and graduated BA in 1702, MA in 1705, and DD in 1717. He married Penelope Lovell, daughter of Sir Salathiel Lovell.

== Career ==
Stanope was appointed:

- Prebendary of Oxgate in St Paul's 1711 - 1737
- Rector of St Mary's Church, East Leake 1717

Stanhope was appointed to the sixth stall in St George's Chapel, Windsor Castle in 1730 and held the canonry until 1737.

== Later years and legacy ==
Stanhope died in about 1737. He had four sons

- Arthur Charles Stanhope (1715-1770)
- Sir Thomas Stanhope (1717-1770)
- Ferdinand Stanhope (1718-1790)
- His youngest son Lovell Stanhope (1720-1783) was a lawyer, administrator and politician.
