= George Bunbury =

Irish MP for Thomastown 1786 - 1790

Member of Parliament for Gowran
- In office 1797-1800

Member of Parliament for Thomastown
- In office 1786-1790

Personal details
- Born: 24 November 1747; Ireland
- Died: 27 May 1820 (aged 72)
- Education: Trinity College, Dublin

George Bunbury (24 November 1747 – 27 May 1820) was an Irish politician.

Bunbury was educated at Trinity College, Dublin.

Bunbury was MP for the Irish constituency of Thomastown from 1786 until 1790; and Gowran from 1797 to 1800.
