= Lovell Stanhope =

British lawyer, administrator and politician

Lovell Stanhope (1720–1783) was a British lawyer, administrator and politician who sat in the House of Commons between 1774 and 1783.

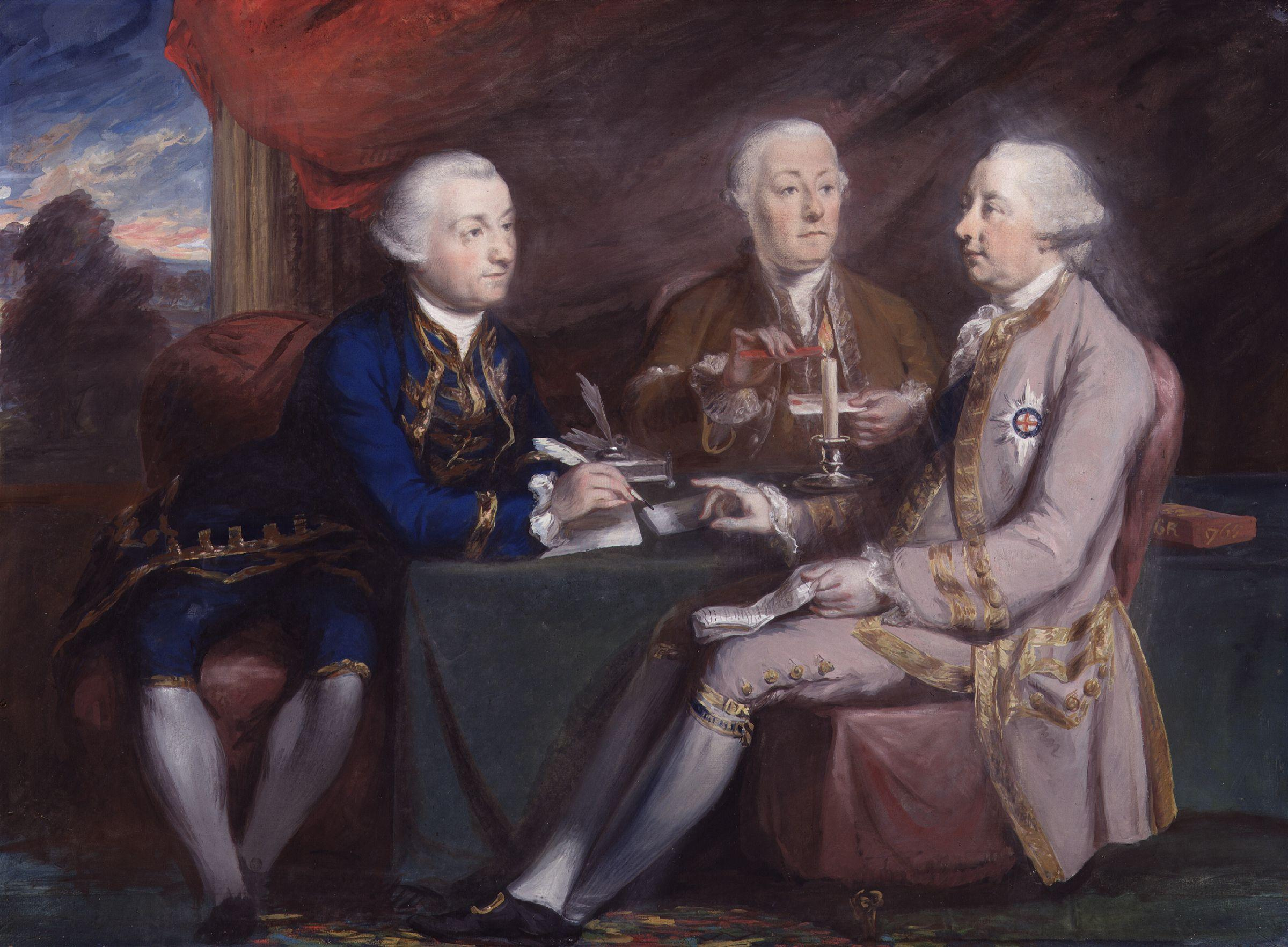
Lord Halifax and his secretaries

Stanhope was the fourth son of Rev. Michael Stanhope and his wife Penelope Lovell, daughter of Sir Salathiel Lovell and was baptised on 12 December 1720. His father was canon of Windsor and was a distant cousin of Philip Stanhope, 4th Earl of Chesterfield. Stanhope was admitted at Lincoln's Inn in 1743 and called to the bar in 1747.

Lord Chesterfield brought him into the secretary of state's office as a law clerk in 1747 and he held the position until 1774. From 1757 to 1763 Stanhope was an agent for Jamaica and he became gentleman usher to the Queen in 1761. Lord Halifax appointed him under-secretary in 1764, but he resigned in 1765 when the Duke of Grafton demanded his full-time attention in the office. He was re-appointed under-secretary by Lord Halifax again in January 1771 but retired in March with a pension.

At the 1774 General Election, after resigning his clerkship, Stanhope was returned unopposed as Member of Parliament for Winchester on the interest of the Duke of Chandos. He was returned unopposed again for Winchester at the 1780 general election. In 1780 he was appointed Clerk of the Green Cloth.

Stanhope died unmarried on 19 September 1783.

Parliament of Great Britain
Preceded by Henry Penton; George Paulet	Member of Parliament for Winchester; 1774–1783; With: Henry Penton	Succeeded by Henry Penton; Henry Flood
