= James Agar (1713–1769) =

Irish politician

James Agar was an Irish politician. He is most famous for his bitter feud with his rival, Henry Flood over political control of the Irish Parliamentary borough and corporation of Callan, County Kilkenny which led to him being killed in a duel. He was the father of the first and last Baron Callan.

== Career ==
Agar was the second son of James Agar of Gowran Castle, County Kilkenny, and his second wife Mary Wemyss, daughter of Sir Henry Wemyss. He was educated at Trinity College, Dublin. From 1747 to 1760, he was MP for Gowran in County Kilkenny, having in effect inherited the seat, which had been held by his father and his brother Henry Agar. His relations with Henry were poor, and resulted in an unsuccessful legal action by James against Henry.

In 1761 he elected MP for Callan borough (in Kilkenny) but this was overturned on petition by Henry Flood, who's family had controlled the borough since the 1710s. After being removed, Flood replaced him as MP.

In 1768, he was elected to the Irish Parliament in Tulsk Borough in County Roscommon.

== Duel and death ==
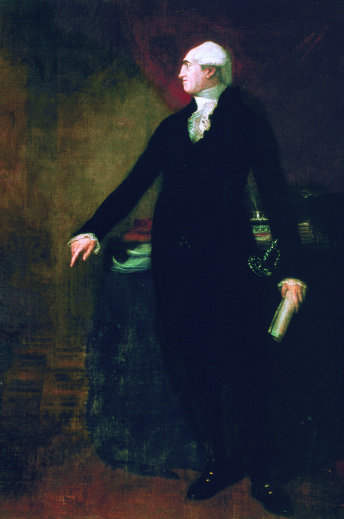
Henry Flood, Agar's bitter rival, who killed him in a duel

After losing his seat in Callan Borough to Henry Flood on petition, he returned 4 years later and bought the Callan estate, making him the largest landowner in the borough and Lord of the Manor. He used his new position to lay claim to the patronage of the corporation from Flood.

This feud ended in 1769 with him being killed in a duel with Flood, who had become more than a bitter political rival vying with him for control of the borough of Callan, he had become a personal enemy. Flood had provoked an earlier duel by assaulting James, but both men survived unscathed. The bitter rivalry, involving much vexatious litigation, continued, leading to further violence, and resulted in another challenge. At the second duel James, who missed with his first shot, reputedly shouted "Fire, you scoundrel!": Flood duly fired, killing James.

At the insistence of the Agar family Flood was prosecuted for murder, but was found guilty of manslaughter, and spared a prison sentence, as according to the code of the time he had acted honourably. The case, which aroused huge public interest, did no harm to Flood's reputation: indeed, the episode is said to have increased the popularity of duels, due partly to the high social standing of the protagonists.

== Marriage and children ==
Agar married the Hon. Rebecca Flower, daughter of William Flower, 1st Baron Castle Durrow and Edith Caulfeild, and had six children. Their third son was George Agar, 1st Baron Callan: another son was Charles Agar, Archdeacon of Emly.
