= Lord Henry Paulet =

Royal Navy officer

Vice-Admiral Lord Henry Paulet KCB
- Born: 31 March 1767
- Died: 28 January 1832 (aged 64); Westhill Lodge, Titchfield, Hampshire
- Relatives: George Paulet, 12th Marquess of Winchester (father)
- Military career
- Allegiance: United Kingdom
- Branch: Royal Navy
- Service years: – 1832
- Rank: Vice-Admiral
- Nickname: Harry
- Commands: HMS Nautilus; HMS Vengeance; HMS Astraea; HMS Thalia; HMS Defence; HMS Terrible
- Conflicts: Battle of the Saintes; Battle of Groix
- Awards: Knight Commander of the Order of the Bath; Naval Gold Medal

Vice-Admiral Lord Henry Paulet KCB (31 March 1767 – 28 January 1832) was a Royal Navy officer who served in the American War of Independence and the French Revolutionary and Napoleonic Wars. Born into the British nobility as a younger son of the Marquess of Winchester, he rose through the ranks and had gained his own command by the early stages of the French Revolutionary Wars. He was involved in a number of famous engagements during his career, such as the capture of the French frigate Gloire in 1795, though he narrowly missed out on seeing direct action at two of the most significant naval battles of the wars with the French.

The first was the Battle of Cape St Vincent, where he had left Jervis's fleet a few days previously, the second was the Battle of Copenhagen, where he remained with Sir Hyde Parker's reserve squadron. He nevertheless rose through the ranks to reach vice-admiral, despite an incident that saw him court-martialled and dismissed, only to be reinstated by the intervention of the King; and a tendency to eccentricity. He married towards the end of the wars with France, and had several children. Paulet served as one of the Lords Commissioners of the Admiralty from 1813, and was installed as a Knight Commander of the Bath in 1815, but ill-health forced his retirement from active service shortly afterwards, and he would die of cancer in 1832.

== Family and early life ==
Henry Paulet was born in 1767, the younger son of George Paulet, 12th Marquess of Winchester, and a brother to Charles Paulet, the future 13th Marquess of Winchester. Paulet joined the navy as a midshipman during the later years of the American War of Independence. He spent 11 years at this rank, during which time he was present at Admiral Sir George Rodney's victory at the Battle of the Saintes. He was made junior lieutenant aboard HMS Crown at Spithead in early February 1789. The Crown then became flagship of Commodore William Cornwallis, who sailed with a squadron to India. Paulet reached Tenerife with the ship, but on the squadron's arrival there he was transferred to the frigate HMS Phoenix in exchange for one of the Phoenix's lieutenants. Paulet completed the voyage to India with the Phoenix, but shortly after his arrival he learnt that he was not to be taken back aboard the Crown. He was invalided back to Britain aboard the East Indiaman Houghton.

== Promotion and command ==
Paulet was appointed to HMS Vulcan in 1791, still as a lieutenant, though he was moved to HMS Assistance in April 1792. On 20 February 1793 Paulet received a promotion to master and commander, and command of the sloop HMS Nautilus. He commanded the Nautilus as part of John Laforey's naval force that captured Tobago on 15 April 1793. He was promoted again to post-captain on 9 January 1794 and was given command of HMS Vengeance by Sir John Jervis. Paulet served as flag captain to Commodore Charles Thompson at the capture of Martinique.

=== Command of HMS Astraea ===
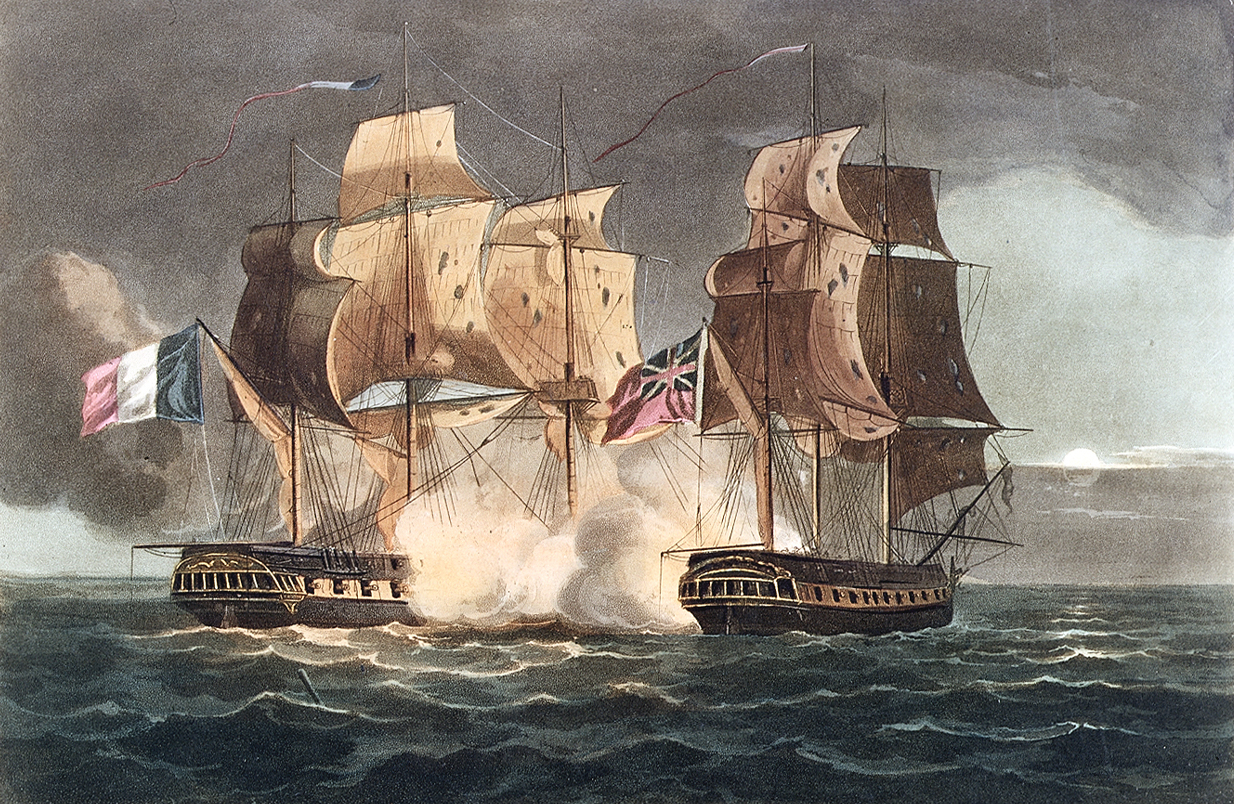
HMS Astraea captures the Gloire, a print by Thomas Whitcombe

After this success, Paulet returned to Britain and was given command of the 32-gun fifth rate HMS Astraea, cruising in the English Channel under the orders of Sir John Colpoys. While sailing in thick fog on 10 April 1795 three sails were spotted through a break. Identifying them as enemy frigates Paulet gave chase to one of them. He closed the distance, and after foiling an attempt from the French ship to rake the Astraea, Paulet came alongside and the two ships exchanged broadsides for nearly an hour before the French ship struck. She was discovered to be the 42-gun Gloire, with 275 men aboard. She had suffered casualties of 40 killed and wounded, while Astraea, of 32 guns and 212 men, had only eight wounded. For this feat Paulet was awarded the Naval Gold Medal.

=== Command of HMS Thalia ===
Paulet's next command was the 36-gun frigate HMS Thalia, attached to Lord Bridport's fleet. He was present at the Battle of Groix, afterwards taking on board the fleet's flag captain, William Domett, and one of the captured French captains. The Thalia almost ran onto rocks while rounding Ushant, but Paulet was able to get her off safely. While returning to the fleet two frigates were spotted in the distance, which Domett feared might be French. In reply Paulet pointed to the guns on the maindeck and said 'Never mind Domett, those are 18-pounders, and hit hard.'

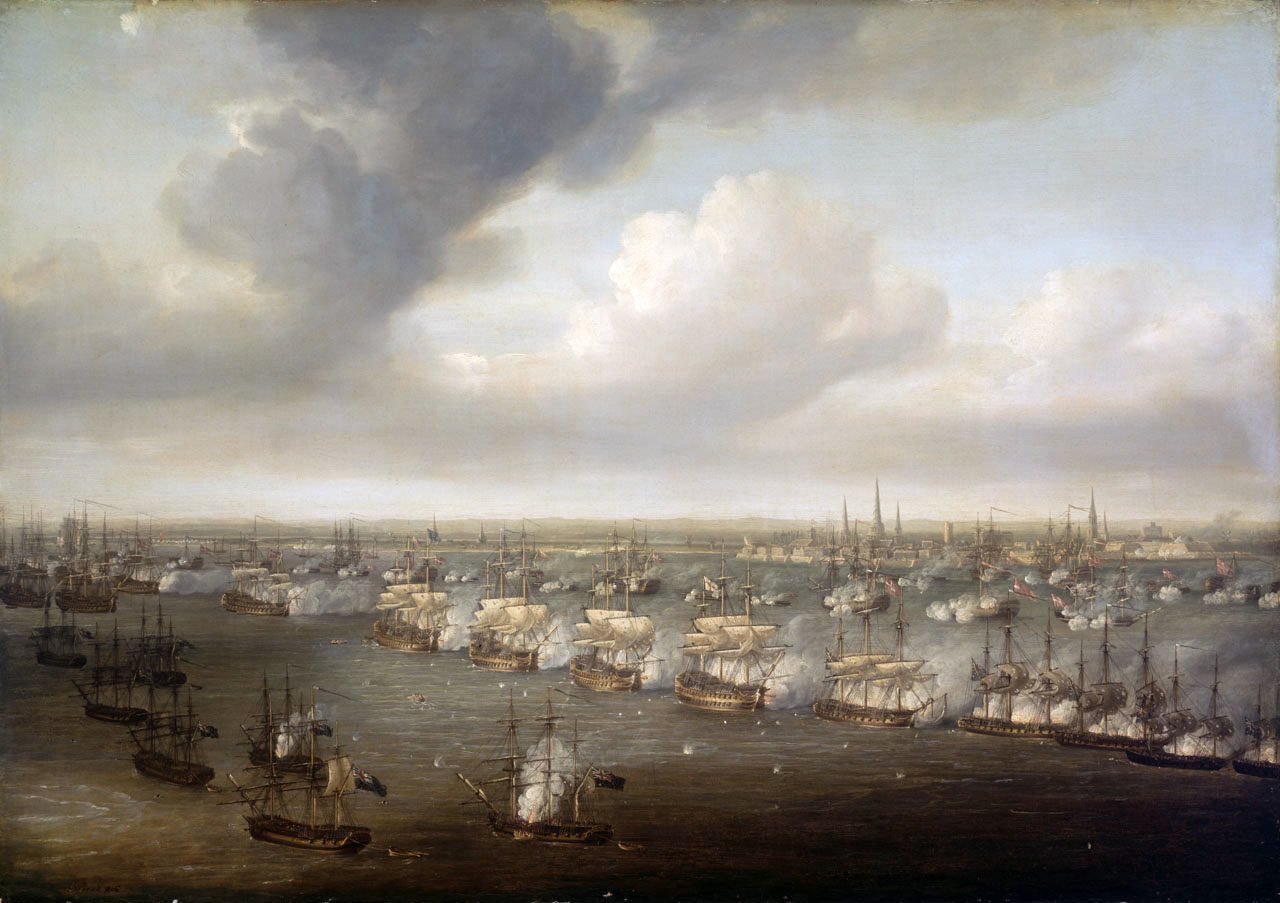
Nicholas Pocock's depiction of the Battle of Copenhagen. Though Paulet was present, he took no part in the actual fighting.

Paulet and the Thalia continued to serve in the Channel until January 1797, when they were sent with Rear-Admiral William Parker to reinforce John Jervis's fleet prior to the Battle of Cape St Vincent. Thalia was not present at the battle though, having been attached to the Mediterranean Fleet a few days earlier. While in the Mediterranean he captured the 16-gun corvette Espoir, and several French and Spanish privateers.

It was about this time that an incident occurred that temporarily clouded his career. In a moment of anger he struck one of the Thalia's lieutenants, Robert Forbes. He was brought to court-martial on 12 June 1798 aboard HMS Prince, and the offence being proved, the court had no choice but to dismiss him from the service. In view of the mitigating circumstances, the court recommended that Paulet be considered for clemency by King George III. The King was pleased to follow the recommendation and reinstated Paulet in the service.

Paulet then received command of the 74-gun HMS Defence. He went with Sir Hyde Parker to the Baltic in 1801 and while he and the Defence were present at the Battle of Copenhagen, they were kept with Parker's reserve squadron and took no part in the fighting.

The Defence was paid off with the conclusion of the Treaty of Amiens in 1802, though the resumption of hostilities led to Paulet's return to service as captain of HMS Terrible. He commanded her in the blockades of the French and Spanish ports, and by 1806 he was in the West Indies. In August that year the Terrible was caught in a hurricane, completely dismasted and almost wrecked.

== Personal and later life ==
Paulet was something of an eccentric. On one occasion, while his ship was moored at Spithead, he asked his admiral for permission to take leave to visit London. This was refused, with the comment that Paulet could travel as far on land as he could get in his barge. Thus challenged, Paulet loaded his barge onto a cart and went off to London anyway.

He became a Colonel of Royal Marines on 1 August 1811, and advanced to rear-admiral on 12 August 1812. He replaced William Johnstone Hope as one of the Lords Commissioners of the Admiralty in 1813, holding the position until being forced to retire in 1816 due to ill health. On 2 January 1815, Paulet was appointed a Knight Commander of the Order of the Bath, and in 1819 was promoted to vice-admiral. On 26 October 1813, he married Anna-Maria Ravenscroft, with whom he had two sons and three daughters.

Increasingly ill during his last years from cancer, that it was believed had been brought on by a fall against a slide of one of the carronades aboard the Terrible, Paulet died on 28 January 1832 at his seat of Westhill Lodge, Tichfield, Hampshire. He was buried in the family vault at Amport on 3 February. His eldest son Henry Charles Paulet was created a baronet in his honour in 1836.
