= Charles Agar (Archdeacon of Emly) =

Irish Anglican priest

Charles Agar (28 May 1755 – 5 May 1789) was an Irish Anglican priest.

The second son of James Agar MP of Ringwood, County Kilkenny, and the Hon. Rebecca Flower, daughter of William Flower, 1st Baron Castle Durrow, he was educated at Eton College and Christ Church, Oxford. His father was killed in a duel with Henry Flood in 1769. He was M.P. for Kilkenny City from May to July 1778; and Archdeacon of Emly from 1788 until 1788. He died unmarried at the age of 34.
