= Espoir (ship) =

During the French Revolutionary and Napoleonic Wars, British vessels captured at least 12 French warships and privateers named Espoir, which means “Hope” in French. In only one case was there mention of an exchange of fire or casualties. In general, the privateers tried to escape, and failing that surrendered.

- HMS Crescent captured the French privateer Espoir, of ten guns, on 2 March 1793. Espoir was under the command of Jean-Jacques Magendie. By agreement Crescent shared the bounty bill with HMS Hind and the money was payable in Guernsey in July 1795.
- HM hired armed cutter Marechal de Cobourg captured the French privateer lugger Espoir on 12 December 1796. Espoir was a 40-ton ("of load") lugger commissioned in Boulogne in May 1793 under Pierre-Louis-Nicolas Hardouin with 8 swivel guns and 6 smaller pieces (swivel-mounted, large caliber blunderbusses), and a crew of 37 men. She was under Jean-Pierre-Antoine Duchenne from October to November 1795, and under Pierre-Antoine-Joseph Sauvage, with 20 men and 2 guns, when Coburg captured her.
- On 31 January 1797 HMS Lapwing was sailing off Barbuda when she captured the French privateer schooner Espoir. Espoir was armed with four guns and ten swivel guns, and had a crew of 48 men. She was out of Guadeloupe and Lapwing sent her into St. Christopher's.
- In mid-morning of 24 June 1797 His Majesty's Excise cutter Viper, under the command of Mr. Robert Adams, was south of the Naze Tower when she encountered and captured a French privateer. Espoir had a crew of 15 men and was under the command of Pierre Francois Codderin. Espoir was armed with two swivel guns and was well supplied with small arms. She had sailed from Dunkirk two days earlier and had not yet taken any prizes.
- On 15 September 1797, HMS King’s Fisher, under the command of Commander Charles H. Pierrepont, was off Camina when she encountered the French privateer lugger Espoir, which she captured. Espoir was armed with two carriage guns and four swivel guns and had a crew of 39 men. She was 13 days out of Rochelle but had not made any captures.
- HMS Thalia, under Captain Lord Henry Paulet, captured the French navy brig Espoir in the Mediterranean on 18 September 1797. Espoir was armed with sixteen 6-pounder guns and had a crew of 96 men. She had sailed from Cayenne and earlier had been in company with another French corvette, which had, however been captured by an English frigate on 20 July. The Admiralty took her into the Royal Navy as Espoir. Later, Thalia shared the prize money with HMS Romulus and HMS Mahonesa.
- On 8 February 1798 HMS Zephyr, under the command of Commander William Champain captured the privateer Espoire (or Espoir), off La Désirade. Espoir was armed with eight guns and had a crew of 66 men. She was 16 days out of Guadeloupe but had made no captures (Note: A first-class share of the head money was worth £97 7s 7½d; a fifth-class share was worth 19s 11½d.)
- On 11 February 1801, His Majesty's hired armed brig Lady Charlotte, under the command of George Morris, was in Plymouth Sound when she sighted a vessel and gave chase. Eventually Lady Charlotte was able to capture the lugger Espoir. She was armed with two brass 4-pounder and four iron 2-pounder guns, and had a crew of 23 men. She was two days out of Cherbourg and had not taken any prizes. Because of the strength of the wind, Lady Charlotte was not able to take prisoners off nor put a prize crew on board so she escorted her prize into port.
- In mid-afternoon on 28 February 1801, the English privateer Lord Nelson, Henry Gibson, master, was between the Isle of Wight and Portland when a lugger came into sight, pursued by a larger vessel. Gibson sailed towards the lugger to cut her off. After a chase of four hours he caught up with her and as he was about to board her, she stuck her colours. The quarry was the French privateer Espoir, under the command of M. Alegis Basset. She was armed with 14 carriage guns and had a crew of 75 men. She was two days out of Saint Malo without having captured anything. Neither captive nor quarry suffered any casualties. The vessel that had been pursuing her was HMS Oiseau, which came up as Lord Nelson was taking on board the prisoners. (Note: A letter of marque dated 1 February 1801 had been issued to a Humphrey Gibson of the schooner Lord Nelson. The warrant showed her as armed with eight 3 and 4-pounder guns and having a crew of 40 men.)
- When the fog cleared on 8 September 1803, Lieutenant William Gibbons of His Majesty's hired armed cutter Joseph, discovered two or three miles away the British privateer cutter Maria, (Note: On 17 June 1803 a letter of marque was issued to John Knight of the cutter Maria, of 106 tons burthen. She was armed with two 6-pounder guns and ten 12-pounder carronades, and had a crew of 60.) of Guernsey, chasing two brigs, one of which was the French privateer Espoir of Saint Malo. Espoir was firing her stern chasers at Maria, and also broadsides. After about an hour Gibbons was able to get within pistol-shot of Espoir, which struck after a few shots from Joseph. Espoir and Maria both had one man wounded. Espoir was armed with six 6-pounder guns and had a crew of 52 men. Gibbons sent Maria, which was the faster vessel, after the second brig, which had been a prize to Espoir. After a two-hour chase Maria succeeded in recapturing the brig. She was Two Friends, sailing from Mogadore to London.
- On 20 August 1806 HMS Grenada captured the French privateer Espoir. (Note: A first-class share of the head money was worth £14 12s 8d; a fifth-class share, that of a seaman, was worth 6s 2½d.)
- Captain Samuel Clark and HMS Rolla captured the French privateer lugger Espoir on 6 October 1811, off Fécamp. Espoir was armed with 16 guns and had a crew of 50 men. She had sailed the evening before from Saint-Valery-en-Caux and had not taken any prizes.
