= George Paulet, 12th Marquess of Winchester =

English courtier and nobleman

- Marquess of Winchester
- Other names: George Powlett
- Years active: 1750–1800
- Born: George Paulet; June 7, 1722; Amport, Hampshire, England
- Died: April 22, 1800 (aged 77)
- Issue: Charles Paulet, 13th Marquess of Winchester; Lady Urania Anne Paulet; Lord Henry Paulet
- Father: Norton Powlett
- Occupation: Courtier and Member of Parliament

George Paulet, 12th Marquess of Winchester (7 June 1722 – 22 April 1800), known as George Paulet or Powlett until 1794, was an English courtier and nobleman.

== Early life ==
Paulet was the eighth and youngest son of Norton Powlett or Paulet (d. 1741), of Amport, himself a grandson of Lord Henry Paulet, of Amport, whose father was William Paulet, 4th Marquess of Winchester.

George Paulet was a third cousin once removed of Harry Powlett, 4th Duke of Bolton, a man who had sons, and he was himself the youngest of many sons, so in his early life there seemed almost no prospect of the inheritance which eventually came to him.

== Career ==
Paulet held a series of court appointments. On 29 October 1750, he was appointed an Extra Gentleman Usher to Frederick, Prince of Wales, and served until the Prince's death in 1751. From 1758 to 1772, he was a Gentleman Usher to Frederick's widow, Augusta, Dowager Princess of Wales.

In 1759, Charles Powlett, 5th Duke of Bolton, a man a few years older than Paulet, succeeded his father the 4th Duke.

In 1761, Paulet was appointed High Sheriff of Hampshire. In 1764, the wife of Lord Harry Powlett, the heir presumptive, died.

In July 1765, the 5th Duke died unmarried and was succeeded by his younger brother Lord Harry, who also became Marquess of Winchester. As the new Duke then had only a daughter and no surviving brothers or nephews, George Paulet's elder brother William Paulet, a naval officer, became heir presumptive to the peerage of Marquess of Winchester. In April 1765, the new Duke had married again, but had only further daughters.

In 1765, Paulet was elected as a Member of Parliament for Winchester as a Tory, after Harry Powlett had become Duke of Bolton in July. Paulet was appointed as Groom Porter to King George III on 23 December 1765, holding the office until it was abolished on 14 November 1782.

By the time Paulet left Parliament in 1774, his brother had died and he had become heir presumptive to the Marquessate of Winchester. By the 1780s, as the years passed, it seemed increasingly likely that George Paulet would indeed come into the inheritance.

In 1793, Paulet was the first commissioner for the Lord-Lieutenancy of Hampshire, formerly held by the Duke of Bolton, and in the following year, succeeded as Marquess of Winchester upon the Duke's death (the dukedom becoming extinct). Appointed Vice-Admiral of Dorset and of Hampshire in 1797, he died in 1800 and was succeeded in the marquessate by his eldest son Charles.

== Personal life ==
On 7 January 1762, he married Martha Ingoldsby (d. 1796), by whom he had three children:

- Charles Paulet, 13th Marquess of Winchester (1764–1843)
- Lady Urania Anne Paulet (27 January 1766 – 27 December 1843), who married first on 17 March 1785 Henry de Burgh, 1st Marquess of Clanricarde (d. 1797). After his death, she married Col. Peter Kington (d. 1807) on 28 October 1799, with whom she had issue. After her second husband's death, she married V-Adm. Sir Joseph Sidney Yorke on 22 May 1813.
- Lord Henry Paulet (1767–1832), a Vice Admiral who saw service in the American War of Independence, the French Revolutionary and Napoleonic Wars

Parliament of Great Britain
Preceded by Henry Penton; Lord Harry Powlett	Member of Parliament for Winchester; 1765–1774; With: Henry Penton	Succeeded by Henry Penton; Lovell Stanhope
Court offices
Preceded by Robert Wood	Groom Porter; 1765–1782	Office abolished
Honorary titles
Preceded by William Bennett	High Sheriff of Hampshire; 1761	Succeeded by Thomas Gatehouse
Vacant Title last held by The Duke of Bolton	Vice-Admiral of Dorset; 1797–1800	Vacant
Vacant Title last held by The Duke of Bolton	Vice-Admiral of Hampshire; 1797–1800	Vacant Title next held by The Lord Bolton
Peerage of England
Preceded by Harry Powlett	Marquess of Winchester; 1794–1800	Succeeded by Charles Paulet
