= Thomastown (Parliament of Ireland constituency) =

Pre-1801 Irish constituency

- Former borough constituency for the Irish House of Commons
- County: County Kilkenny
- Borough: Thomastown

1541–1801
- Seats: 2
- Replaced by: Disfranchised

Thomastown was a constituency represented in the Irish House of Commons until 1800. Following the Acts of Union 1800 the borough was disenfranchised.

== Members of Parliament ==
- 1560 Francis Cosby and Henry Colley
- 1585 Walter Sherlock and Robert Porter
- 1613–1615 Robert Porter and Nicolas Robucke
- 1634–1635 Patrick Sherlock and Jacob Walsh
- 1639–1649 Seafoule Gibson and Michael Wandesford
- 1661–1666 Robert Shapcote (sat for Wicklow Borough and replaced 1661 by John Brett) and Thomas Burrell

=== 1689–1801 ===
Election	First MP	Second MP
1689	Robert Grace, Snr	Robert Grace, Jnr
1692	William Harrison	John Hayes
1695	Christopher Hewetson	Arthur Bushe
1703	John Beauchamp	Arthur Bushe
1713	Amyas Bushe	Arthur Bushe
1715	William Flower	John Cuffe
1715	William Despard	John Cuffe
1721	Richard Bettesworth	John Cuffe
1727	Luke Gardiner	Nicholas Aylward
1755	Redmond Morres	Nicholas Aylward
1757	Redmond Morres	Hon. Joseph Leeson
1761	Alexander McAuley	Thomas Eyre
1767	Lord Frederick Campbell	Thomas Eyre
1768	James Agar	Thomas Maunsell
1769	George Dunbar	Thomas Maunsell
1776	Robert Forde	Edward Bellingham Swan
1783	George Roth	Patrick Welch
1786	George Bunbury	Patrick Welch
1790	George Bunbury	George Burdett
1798	George Dunbar	James Kearney
March 1800	Hon. Charles William Stewart	James Kearney
April 1800	Hon. Charles William Stewart	William Gardiner
May 1800	John Francis Cradock	William Gardiner
1801	Constituency disenfranchised	

== See also ==
- Thomastown, a town in County Kilkenny
- Irish House of Commons
- List of Irish constituencies
