= George Burdett (politician) =

18th Century Irish MP

George Burdett was an Irish politician.

Burdett was educated at Trinity College, Dublin.

Bunbury was MP for the Irish constituency of Gowran from 1783 to 1790;Thomastown from 1790 to 1797; and Gowran again from 1798 to 1800
