= Henry Agar-Ellis, 3rd Viscount Clifden =

Irish courtier and racehorse owner

Henry Agar-Ellis, 3rd Viscount Clifden (25 February 1825 – 20 February 1866), styled the Lord Dover from 1833 to 1836, was an Irish courtier and racehorse owner.

Viscount Clifden was the eldest son of George Agar-Ellis, 1st Baron Dover, and his wife Lady Georgiana, daughter of George Howard, 6th Earl of Carlisle. He succeeded as Baron Dover on the death of his father in 1833 and in the viscountcy of Clifden on the death of his grandfather in 1836. He was educated at Eton and Christ Church, Oxford, and served as a Gentleman of the Bedchamber to the Prince Consort from 1846 to 1852. He owned the successful racehorses, Crucifix and her son, Surplice.

Lord Clifden married Eliza Horatia Frederica, daughter of Frederick Charles William Seymour, in 1861. He died in February 1866, aged 40, and was succeeded in his titles by his only son Henry. Lady Clifden was later a Lady of the Bedchamber from 1867 to 1872 and was appointed a Lady of the Royal Order of Victoria and Albert (3rd Class). On 12 October 1873 she married Sir Walter George Stirling of Faskine, 3rd Baronet. She died in April 1896, aged 62.

== Notes ==
Peerage of Ireland
Preceded by Henry Welbore Ellis	Viscount Clifden; 1836–1866	Succeeded by Henry George Agar-Ellis
Peerage of the United Kingdom
Preceded by George James Welbore Agar-Ellis	Baron Dover; 1833–1866	Succeeded by Henry George Agar-Ellis
