= Crucifix (horse) =

British-bred Thoroughbred racehorse

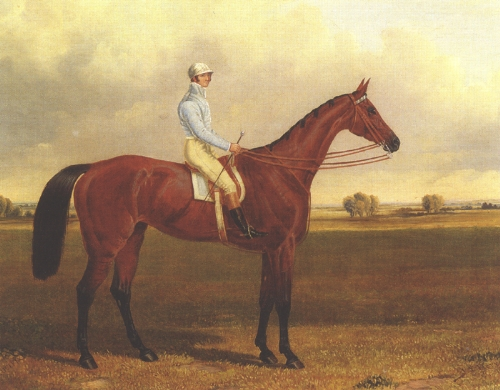
- Artist: John Frederick Herring, Sr.
- Sire: Priam
- Grandsire: Emilius
- Dam: Octaviana
- Damsire: Octavian
- Sex: Mare
- Foaled: 1837
- Country: Great Britain
- Colour: Bay
- Breeder: George Stanhope, 6th Earl of Chesterfield
- Owner: 1. Lord George Bentinck; 2. Edward Lloyd-Mostyn, 2nd Baron Mostyn; 3. Henry Agar-Ellis, 3rd Viscount Clifden.
- Trainer: John Barham Day
- Record: 12: 12-0-0
- Earnings: £10,287

Major wins
- 1000 Guineas (1840); 2000 Guineas (1840); Epsom Oaks (1840)

Crucifix (1837–1857) was an undefeated, Classic Race winning, British-bred Thoroughbred racemare. She was also the dam of three sires who had a great influence on the breed.

== Breeding ==
Crucifix was a bay filly foaled in 1837, by The Derby winner, Priam; her dam was the then 21-year-old, Octaviana by Octavian. Her breeder was George Stanhope, 6th Earl of Chesterfield. Crucifix was a sister to Chesterfield, who sired the stakes-winner, The Hero. Her sire, Priam, also sired The Oaks winners Miss Letty and Industry before he was sold for 3,500 guineas and exported in 1837 to Virginia in the United States.

The powerful racing figure, Lord George Bentinck, bought Crucifix as a foal at foot with her 22-year-old dam for 65 guineas. At maturity, Crucifix stood nearly 16 hands high, with her body being described as "wiry", and she possessed a temperamental disposition.

== Racing record ==
=== At two years: 1839 ===
Crucifix had nine starts for wins in the Chesterfield Stakes (carrying top weight), Lavant Stakes, July Stakes and Molecombe Stakes, the Hopeful Stakes at Newmarket, the Clearwell Stakes, the Prendergast Stakes, and a walk-over in a sweepstakes at Newmarket; in the ninth race, the Criterion Stakes she dead-heated with Gibraltar. Her prize money for that season was a record £4,587.

=== At three years: 1840 ===
In her three starts as a three-year-old, Crucifix won the Two Thousand Guineas, One Thousand Guineas and Epsom Oaks. The false starts resorted to at the start of the Oaks lasted about an hour, and it took about 15 attempts to get the 15 runners started. As a result of these tactics to defeat favourites, Lord George introduced reforms to inhibit this practice. Welfare ran second to Crucifix and she, too, was by Priam. After the running of the Oaks, Crucifix pulled up lame, and was retired with earnings of £10,287.

Crucifix became the shortest odds winner of the 1,000 Guineas when she was 1/10 odds on. She was also the first of only four horses to ever win both the 1,000 Guineas and the 2,000 Guineas in the same year, when the two races were run two days apart. In her dead-heat in the Criterion Stakes at Newmarket Racecourse and her win in the Oaks Stakes at Epsom, Crucifix defeated the good mare Pocahontas and others on each occasion.

== Stud record ==
Crucifix was the dam of:

- 1842 colt, Cowl by Bay Middleton, sire
- 1844 b colt, Crozier by Lancercost
- 1845 b colt, Surplice by Touchstone, won Epsom Derby and St. Leger Stakes, sire of Florin, (won Poule d'Essai des Poulains) and others, and broodmare sire of Queen Bertha
- 1846 Cucullus by Bay Middleton, died
- 1847 colt, Pontifex by Touchstone
- 1849 filly, Rosary by Touchstone
- 1850 b colt, Constantine, by Cotherstone
- 1851 b colt, Cardinal, by Touchstone
- 1852 filly, Chalice by Orlando, won Royal Hunt Cup, second dam of Placida (Epsom Oaks)

In order to pursue his political career Lord Bentinck sold his entire racing interests, including at least 60 horses along with Crucifix and her son, and future Epsom Derby winner, Surplice, for £10,000 to Edward Lloyd-Mostyn, 2nd Baron Mostyn. Crucifix was later sold to Henry Agar-Ellis, 3rd Viscount Clifden.

Ajax, the undefeated French Derby winner and sire, great broodmare Double Life (dam of Precipitation and Persian Gulf), and other winning horses descend from Crucifix in the distaff line. Crucifix also became the 12th dam of another race-mare, Meld who won the British Fillies Triple Crown. Crucifix is the taproot mare of Family 2-i.

Crucifix died in 1857 and was buried beside Bay Middleton at the Days' stables, Danebury, near Stockbridge, Hampshire.

== Pedigree ==
Pedigree of Crucifix (2-i) B. m. 1837
| Sire Priam Bay 1827 | Emilius; Bay 1820 | Orville | Beningbrough |
| Sire Priam Bay 1827 | Emilius; Bay 1820 | Orville | Evelina |
| Sire Priam Bay 1827 | Emilius; Bay 1820 | Emily | Stamford |
| Sire Priam Bay 1827 | Emilius; Bay 1820 | Emily | Whiskey mare 1799 (28) |
| Sire Priam Bay 1827 | Cressida; Bay 1807 | Whiskey | Saltram |
| Sire Priam Bay 1827 | Cressida; Bay 1807 | Whiskey | Calash |
| Sire Priam Bay 1827 | Cressida; Bay 1807 | Young Giantess | Diomed |
| Sire Priam Bay 1827 | Cressida; Bay 1807 | Young Giantess | Giantess |
| Dam Octaviana Bay 1815 | Octavian; Ch. 1807 | Stripling | Phoenomenon |
| Dam Octaviana Bay 1815 | Octavian; Ch. 1807 | Stripling | Laura |
| Dam Octaviana Bay 1815 | Octavian; Ch. 1807 | Oberon mare (1796) | Oberon |
| Dam Octaviana Bay 1815 | Octavian; Ch. 1807 | Oberon mare (1796) | Ranthos mare 1779 (8) |
| Dam Octaviana Bay 1815 | Shuttle mare Bay 1807 | Shuttle | Young Marske |
| Dam Octaviana Bay 1815 | Shuttle mare Bay 1807 | Shuttle | Vauxhall Snap mare 1784 (21) |
| Dam Octaviana Bay 1815 | Shuttle mare Bay 1807 | Zara | Delpini |
| Dam Octaviana Bay 1815 | Shuttle mare Bay 1807 | Zara | Flora (2-c) |

== See also ==
- List of leading Thoroughbred racehorses
- Triple Crown of Thoroughbred Racing
