= John Hickey (Missouri politician) =

American politician

John J. Hickey (born February 23, 1965, in St. Louis) is an American politician who served as a Missouri state representative, being first elected in 1992. He was elected as a Democrat. O'Connor attended St. Thomas Aquinas High School and University of Missouri–St. Louis.
