= John Hickey (Archdeacon of Emly) =

- Born: December 3, 1661; County Tipperary, Ireland
- Died: September 24, 1723 (aged 61)
- Education: Trinity College Dublin
- Occupation: Anglican priest

John Hickey (3 December 1661 – 24 September 1723) was an Anglican priest.

Hickey was born in County Tipperary and educated at Trinity College, Dublin. He was Chancellor of Cashel Cathedral and Archdeacon of Emly from 1697 until his death.

Church of Ireland titles
Preceded by John Le Hunte	Archdeacon of Emly; 1697–1724	Succeeded by John Wetherby
