= Henry Darby (politician) =

Irish politician

Henry Verney Lovett Darby (1754–1818) was an Irish politician.

Darby was born in County Offaly (then called King's County) and educated at Trinity College, Dublin.

Darby was High Sheriff of King's County from 1799 to 1800; and represented Kilkenny City during 1800.
