= Callan (Parliament of Ireland constituency) =

1264-1801 Irish constituency

- Former borough constituency for the Irish House of Commons
- County: County Kilkenny
- Borough: Callan

1264–1801
- Seats: 2
- Replaced by: Disfranchised

== History ==
Callan was a constituency represented in the Irish House of Commons until 1800. Based on Callan, County Kilkenny, it was established by royal charter in 1585, apparently at the request of Thomas Butler, 10th Earl of Ormond. He was a cousin of Elizabeth I on her mother's side, and one of the few Irish leaders in whom she had complete trust. It functioned largely as a Butler controlled borough, with parliamentary seats dominated by families such as the Comerfords, who were closely aligned with the Butlers.

In the Patriot Parliament of 1689 summoned by James II, Callan was represented with two members.

== Members of Parliament, 1585–1801 ==
- 1585 Gerald Comerford and Edward Brennan
- 1613–1615 Pierce Hayden and William Rothe (died and replaced by Richard Forrestal)
- 1634–1635 Edward Comerford and Lord Maltravers
- 1639–1649 Edward Comerford and Sir Thomas Wharton (resigned and replaced 1640 by Richard Bellings (expelled 1642))
- 1661–1666 John Campbell and Henry Baker (Baker died and replaced 1662 by Matthew Harrison)

=== 1689–1801 ===
Election	First MP		Second MP
1689	Walter Butler		Thady Meagher
1692	Samuel Booth		Sir Henry Wemys
1703	Francis Flood (Note: Expelled in June 1705)		Silvester Crosse
1705	John Pacey		Silvester Crosse
1713	Francis Flood		Silvester Crosse
1715	Francis Flood		James Agar
1727	Warden Flood		Henry Wemys
1751	Warden Flood		James Wemys
1761	James Agar (Note: Declared not duly elected in 1761)		Patrick Wemys
1762	Henry Flood (Note: Declared not duly elected in 1776)	Irish Patriot Party	James Wemys
1765	Henry Flood	Irish Patriot Party	Jocelyn Flood
1767	Henry Flood	Irish Patriot Party	John Flood
1776	Henry Flood	Irish Patriot Party	Hercules Langrishe
June 1776	Pierce Butler		George Agar
1783	John Bourke O'Flaherty		George Agar
1790	William Meeke		Nathaniel Warren
March 1796	William Meeke		Hon. Francis James Mathew
November 1796	William Meeke		Charles Kendal Bushe
1798	Patrick Welch		Charles Kendal Bushe
1799	Patrick Welch		James Savage
1801	Disenfranchised		

== Bibliography ==
- O'Hart, John (2007). The Irish and Anglo-Irish Landed Gentry: When Cromwell came to Ireland. Vol. II. Heritage Books. ISBN 978-0-7884-1927-0.
- Leigh Rayment's historical List of Members of the Irish House of Commons. Cites: Johnston-Liik, Edith Mary (2002). The History of the Irish Parliament 1692-1800 (6 volumes). Ulster Historical Foundation.
