= Harry Powlett, 6th Duke of Bolton =

Royal Navy officer and politician (1720–1794)

Admiral His Grace The Duke of Bolton PC
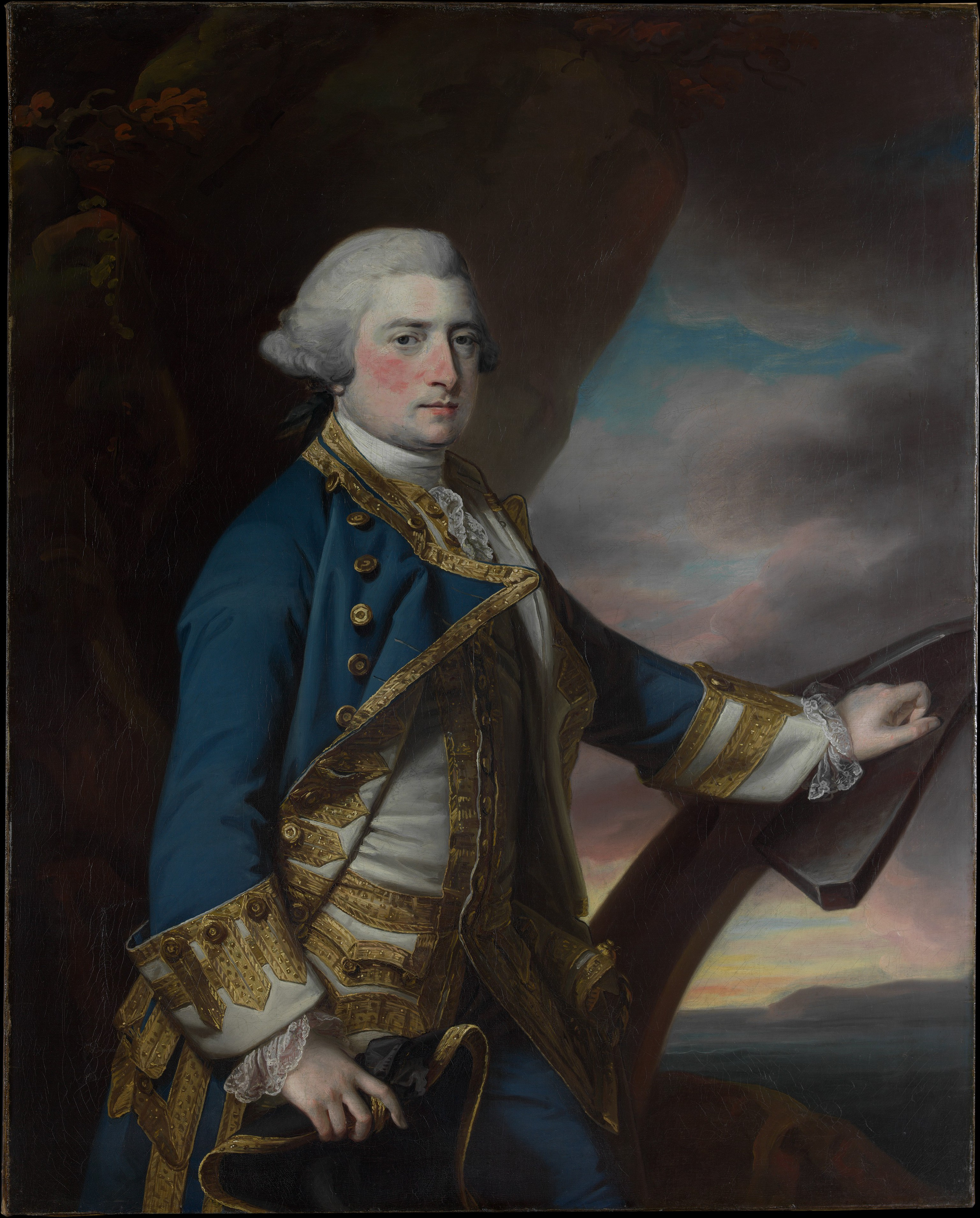
- Portrait of Bolton by Francis Cotes
- Born: 6 November 1720
- Died: 25 December 1794 (aged 74); Hackwood House, Hampshire, England
- Resting place: Basing, Hampshire
- Education: Winchester College; Royal Naval Academy
- Parents: Harry Powlett, 4th Duke of Bolton (father); Catherine Parry (mother)
- Relatives: Charles Powlett (brother)
- Military career
- Allegiance: Great Britain
- Branch: Royal Navy
- Service years: 1733–1794
- Rank: Admiral
- Nickname: "Admiral Stern-post"
- Commands: HMS Port Mahon; HMS Oxford; HMS Sandwich; HMS Ruby; HMS Exeter; HMS Somerset; HMS Barfleur
- Conflicts: War of the Austrian Succession; Battle of Toulon (1744)

Admiral Harry Powlett, 6th Duke of Bolton PC (6 November 1720 – 25 December 1794), styled as Lord Harry Powlett from 1754 to 1765, was a Royal Navy officer and politician.

== Early life ==
Powlett was the second son of Harry Powlett, 4th Duke of Bolton by his wife, Catherine Parry.

== Career ==
He was educated at Winchester College (1728–1729). He joined the Royal Navy, and on 4 March 1740 was promoted lieutenant aboard HMS Shrewsbury. He was promoted captain of HMS Port Mahon on 15 July 1740, and was moved to HMS Oxford in July 1741. In 1744, while commanding Oxford, he took part in the Battle of Toulon, and later gave damaging evidence against Richard Lestock.

He was moved to HMS Sandwich in March 1745, and shortly thereafter to HMS Ruby. On 11 April 1746 Ruby, with HMS Defiance and HMS Salisbury, was dispatched from Plymouth to join the fleet off Brest, France. Before finding the fleet under Admiral William Martin on 22 May, he was able to capture the French frigate Embuscade. He was given command of HMS Exeter in November 1746 and was sent to the East Indies to serve with Rear-Admiral Thomas Griffin and Admiral Edward Boscawen. He was employed by Boscawen at the Siege of Pondicherry in 1748 to take soundings off Pondicherry, in order to arrange the dispositions of the naval blockade of the town.

Upon returning to England in April 1750, Captain Powlett charged Rear-Admiral Griffin with misconduct for failing to engage eight French ships at Cuddalore, a decision which had been generally unpopular among Griffin's captains. Griffin was found guilty of negligence and was temporarily suspended from his rank. Griffin in response court-martialed Powlett on charges including cowardice, which Powlett attempted to escape by going on half-pay. Meanwhile, he entered the House of Commons in 1751 as Member of Parliament for Christchurch.

Despite Powlett's evasions, he was court-martialled on 1 September 1752, but was acquitted due to Griffin's charges having failed for lack of evidence. The incident concluded in 1756 with a duel between the two officers on Blackheath. He was appointed to command HMS Somerset in January 1753.

Powlett's rapid rise to a captaincy and his willingness to commence court martial proceedings against his superiors were a result of his family connections. His father's support of Walpole had made him a Lord of the Admiralty in 1733, a post which he retained until 1742. Even after leaving the Admiralty, the Bolton political connections remained sufficiently strong to ensure his continued promotion. However, he had apparently already become a figure of satire and is believed to have inspired the character of "Captain Whiffle" in Smollett's 1748 novel The Adventures of Roderick Random.

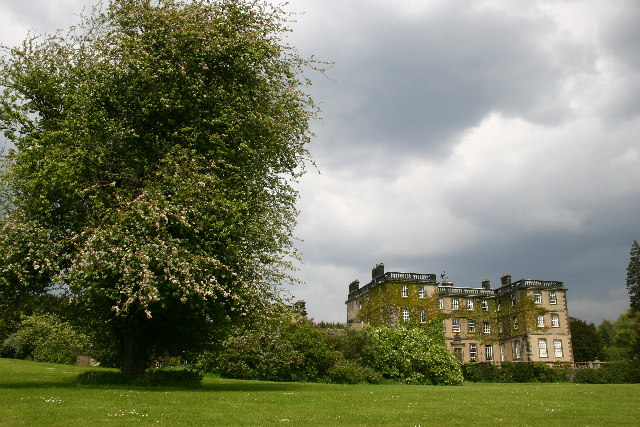
Bolton Hall

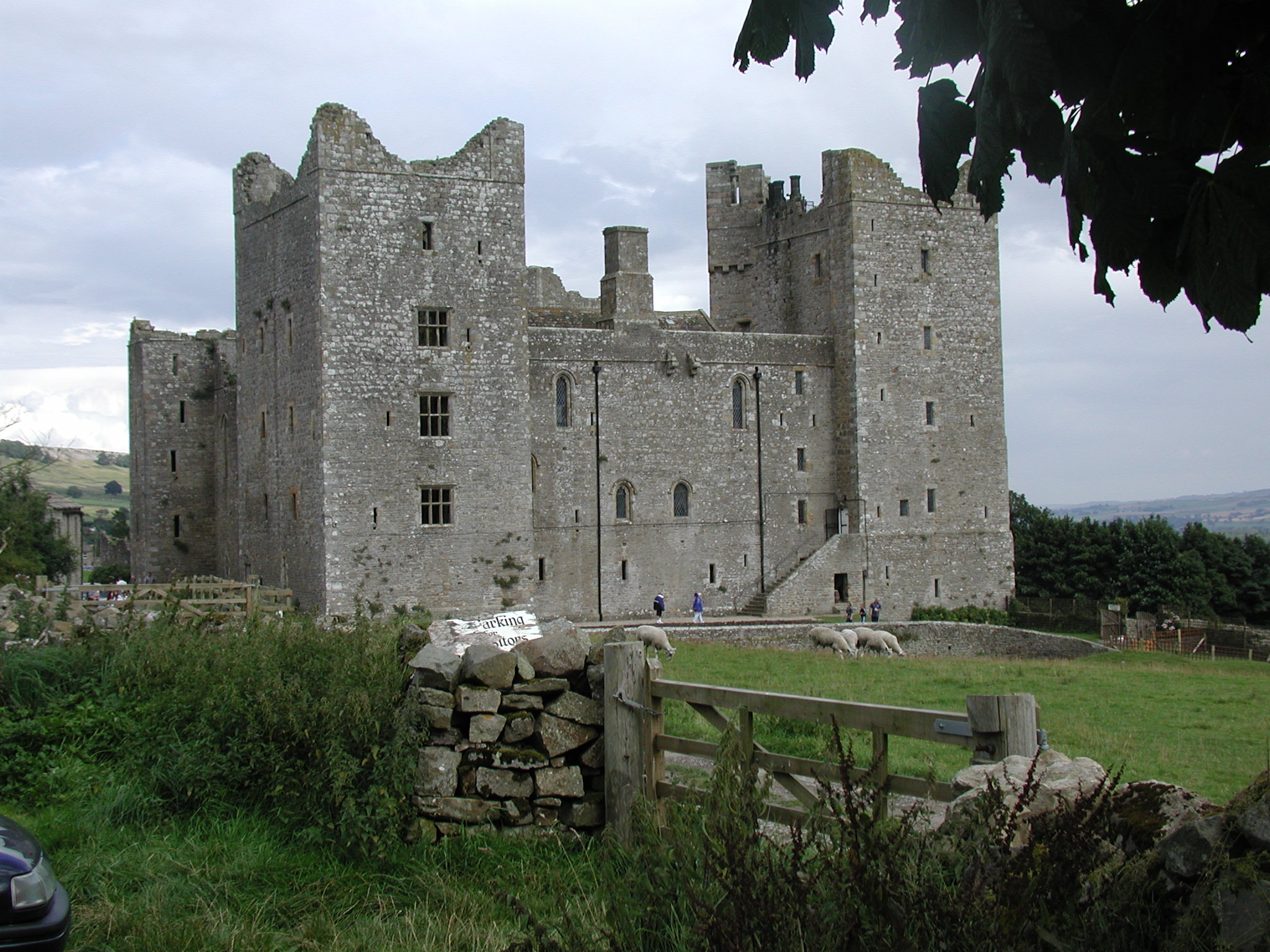
Bolton Castle

In 1754, following his father's succession to the Dukedom, he became known as Lord Harry Powlett, and replaced his elder brother Charles Powlett as MP for the family's pocket borough of Lymington. He was appointed to command HMS Barfleur on 4 February 1755 and petitioned the Duke of Newcastle, then prime minister, for promotion to flag rank, on the strength of his family's support of the government. However, a damaging accident to his reputation occurred soon after, while acting with Admiral Hawke's fleet off France. Sent on 22 August 1755 to chase a ship to the southeast, he became detached from the fleet. While waiting at the rendezvous on 25 August, the ship's carpenter reported Barfleur's sternpost to be extremely loose, and Powlett returned to Spithead for repairs. In October 1755, he was court-martialled for having separated from the fleet and returned to port without justification. He was admonished on the first charge and acquitted on the second, and the carpenter was dismissed as incompetent. It was, however, widely believed that the carpenter had served as a scapegoat, and Powlett thereafter was given the sobriquet of "Captain Stern-Post". (Note: Thomas Maude, surgeon on the Barfleur, gave supportive evidence at Powlett's court-martial, and was taken on by Powlett as steward of his Yorkshire estates upon his inheritance in 1765. A contributor in The Gentleman's Magazine of June 1841 notes that Maude's court-martial evidence probably saved Powlett's life. Capital punishment was mandated for officers who did not do their utmost against the enemy, either in battle or pursuit. A court-martial in the following year sentenced John Byng to death for not doing his utmost to engage or destroy the enemy, and Byng was executed in March 1757.)

Notwithstanding this incident, the Bolton influence proved irresistible, and he was promoted rear admiral on 4 June 1756 and vice admiral of the White on 14 February 1758. Feeling ran strongly against him, despite his promotions, and he never again received a naval command, even at the outbreak of the Seven Years' War in 1754. In 1756, Boscawen supposedly requested Powlett's appointment as his second-in-command, but was refused by King George II, who shared the general low opinion of Powlett. In 1761, he again changed constituencies, and was returned as MP for Winchester.

== Succeeds to dukedom ==
As an indifferent supporter of the government, Powlett was intermittently at odds with George Grenville. However, upon succeeding to the dukedom in July 1765 by his brother's suicide, he threw off his political connections and became a supporter of the crown alone. Bolton was sworn of the Privy Council on 10 December 1766. In 1767, he was given the sinecure post of Vice-Admiral of Dorset and Vice-Admiral of Hampshire (held by several Dukes of Bolton), and promoted to Admiral of the Blue on 18 October 1770 and Admiral of the White on 31 March 1775.

In 1778, he went into opposition to the government over its handling of the American War of Independence, and joined Vice-Admiral Bristol in opposing the court-martial of Admiral Keppel. His political activity diminished after 1780, although in 1782, he was appointed Governor of the Isle of Wight and Lord Lieutenant of Hampshire.

== Marriages and progeny ==
Powlett married twice:

- Firstly on 7 May 1752 to Mary Nunn (died 1764), by whom he had one daughter:
  - Lady Maria Henrietta Powlett (died 30 March 1779), wife of John Montagu, 5th Earl of Sandwich
- Secondly on 8 April 1765, he married Katherine Lowther (died 21 March 1809), daughter of Robert Lowther, and sister of James Lowther, 1st Earl of Lonsdale, by whom he had two daughters:
  - Lady Amelia Powlett, died unmarried
  - Lady Catharine Margaret Powlett (1766 – 17 June 1807), wife of William Vane, 1st Duke of Cleveland

== Death and succession ==
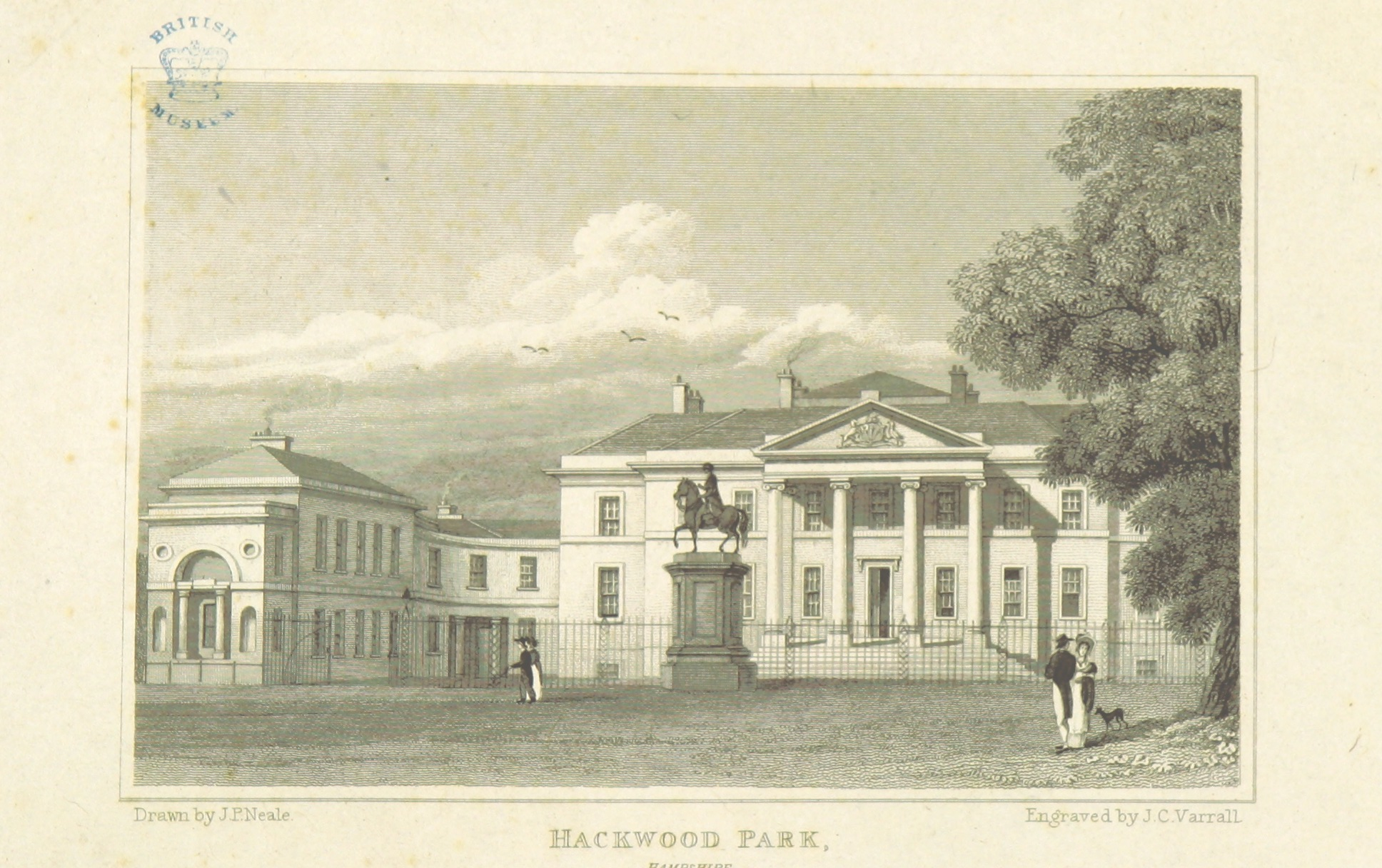
Hackwood Park, Hampshire

He died on 25 December 1794 at Hackwood Park, Winslade, in Hampshire, and was buried in Basing, Hampshire with a monument sculpted by John Flaxman RA.

Afterwards, due to his lack of male progeny, his dukedom became extinct. His distant cousin and heir male George Paulet succeeded to the Marquessate of Winchester and other titles, while his estates of Bolton Hall, Bolton Castle, Hackwood Park and several others devolved upon his brother's natural daughter Jean Browne-Powlett, wife of Thomas Orde (later Thomas Orde-Powlett, 1st Baron Bolton), who adopted the additional surname of Powlett.

== Bibliography ==
- Rodger, N. A. M. (1986). The Wooden World: An Anatomy of the Georgian Navy. Annapolis, Maryland: Naval Institute Press. ISBN 0870219871.
- Crimmin, P. K. (2004). "Powlett, Harry, sixth duke of Bolton (1720–1794)". Oxford Dictionary of National Biography. Oxford Dictionary of National Biography (online ed.). Oxford University Press. doi:10.1093/ref:odnb/21617. (Subscription, Wikipedia Library access or UK public library membership required.)

Parliament of Great Britain
Preceded by Charles Armand Powlett; Sir Thomas Robinson	Member of Parliament for Christchurch; 1751–1754; With: Sir Thomas Robinson	Succeeded by Sir Thomas Robinson; John Mordaunt
Preceded by Sir Harry Burrard; Marquess of Winchester	Member of Parliament for Lymington; 1755–1761; With: Sir Harry Burrard	Succeeded by Sir Harry Burrard; Adam Drummond
Preceded by Henry Penton; Marquess of Carnarvon	Member of Parliament for Winchester; 1761–1765; With: Henry Penton	Succeeded by Henry Penton; George Paulet
Honorary titles
Preceded by Hans Stanley	Governor of the Isle of Wight; 1766–1770	Succeeded by Hans Stanley
Preceded by Hans Stanley	Vice-Admiral of the Isle of Wight; 1767–1771	Succeeded by Hans Stanley
Preceded by Sir Richard Worsley	Governor of the Isle of Wight; 1782–1791	Succeeded by Thomas Orde-Powlett
Vacant Title last held by The Duke of Bolton	Vice-Admiral of Dorset and Hampshire; 1767–1794	Vacant Title next held by The Marquess of Winchester
Preceded by The Lord Rivers	Lord Lieutenant of Hampshire; 1782–1794	Succeeded by In Commission
Peerage of England
Preceded by Charles Powlett	Duke of Bolton; 1765–1794	Extinct
Preceded by Charles Powlett	Marquess of Winchester; 1765–1794	Succeeded by George Paulet
