= Philip Hussey =

Irish portrait-painter

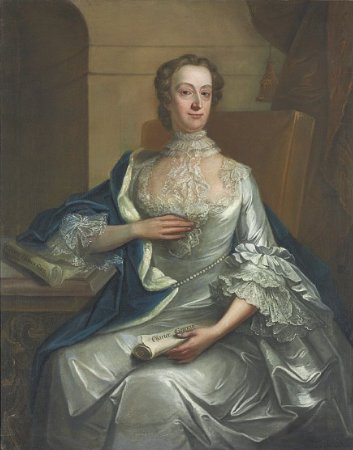
Ellis Agar by Philip Hussey (The painting shows the Countess of Brandon holding the Charters of Gowran and Thomas Town)

Philip Hussey (1713–1783), was an Irish portrait-painter.

Hussey was born at Cloyne, in the county of Cork and his career began as a sailor. He was shipwrecked three times. He drew the figureheads and stern ornaments of vessels, and eventually set up in Dublin as a portrait-painter under the patronage of Lord Chancellor Bowes, painting full-length portraits with some success. He was a good musician, and was skilled as a botanist and florist. Although a notable Irish portrait painter, Hussey is not thought to be amongst the most important. His house was a meeting place of many leading men of art and letters in Dublin. He died at an advanced age in 1783 at his house in Earl Street, Dublin.
