= Gowran Castle =

Castle in County Kilkenny, Ireland

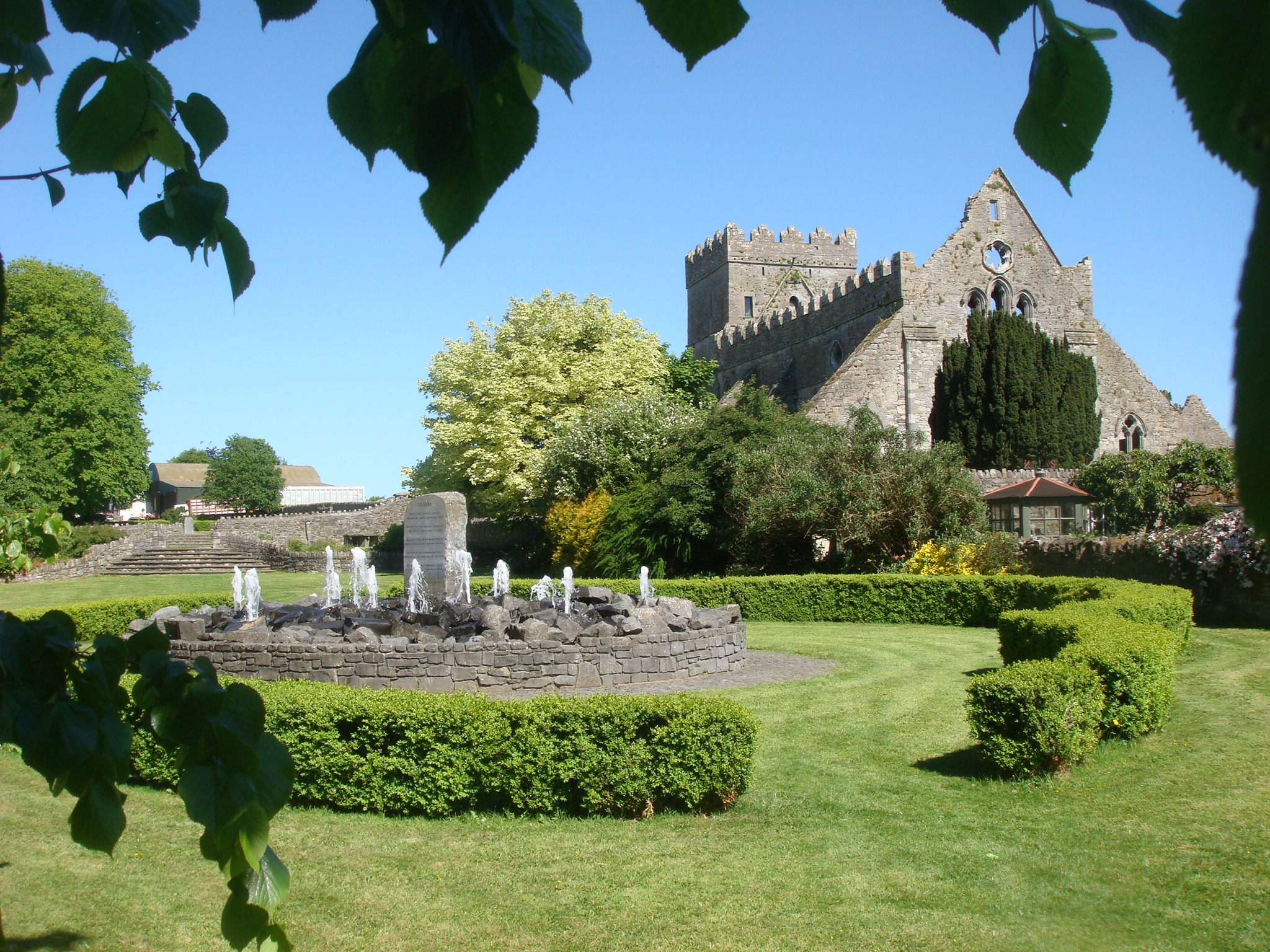
- St. Mary's Collegiate Church Gowran, burial place of James Butler 3rd Earl of Ormond who built the first Gowran Castle in 1385

- Location within Ireland

General information
- Location: County Kilkenny, Ireland, Ireland
- Coordinates: 52°36′N 7°06′W

Gowran Castle is located in the centre of Gowran, County Kilkenny, Ireland. The castle is an early-19th-century manor house, and was fully restored between 2013 and 2014.

== Early years ==
The first Gowran Castle was built in 1385 by James Butler, 3rd Earl of Ormond, close to the centre of the town of Gowran, County Kilkenny, Ireland. He made it his usual residence. James was called the Earl of Gowran. In 1391 he bought Kilkenny Castle and a large part of County Kilkenny. James died in Gowran Castle in 1405 and is buried in St. Mary's Collegiate Church Gowran together with his father James Butler, 2nd Earl of Ormond, his grandfather James Butler, 1st Earl of Ormond and his great-great-grandfather Edmund Butler, Earl of Carrick and 6th Chief Butler of Ireland. James the 2nd Earl was usually called The Noble Earl, being a great-grandson, through his mother, of King Edward I of England.

Gowran had been a settled place and a place of importance long before the arrival of the Normans in Ireland in 1169 A.D. Kings of Ossory were often referred to as kings of Gowran. The Mac Giolla Padraig (Modern day family name Fitzpatrick), Chief Rulers of Ossory, had a residence in Gowran. O’Donnchadha (Dunphy) was the chief of Gowran and most of the area around it. Local place names like Rathvaun, Rathcash, Rathcusack, and Rathgarvan, signified the presence of raths where people lived, farmed and foraged for a livelihood. Raths were also burial places. Larger sites were called Duns. The village of Dungarvan (County Kilkenny) also in the parish of Gowran is another example of such a settlement. The presence of the 3rd/4th Century Christianised Ogham stone on display in the historic St. Mary's Collegiate Church Gowran would also indicate a place of residence and worship dating back 2000 years.

There are other ancient sites close to Gowran. For example, nearby Tullaherin Church, graveyard and Round Tower dating to the 6th Century. Freestone Hill situated 4 km from Gowran was a Bronze Age and Iron Age settlement where Roman coins and other artefacts were found during archaeological surveys in 1948 and 1951.

== Butler of Ormond Influence ==
The Butlers were in possession of the lands in the Gowran area for almost 500 years. Following the Norman Invasion of Ireland in 1169 a grant of 44,000 acres, the Manor of Gowran was made to Theobald Fitzwalter (Theobald Walter, 1st Baron Butler) 1st Chief Butler of Ireland.

== Other Gowran Butler Castles ==
In addition to building Gowran Castle, the Butlers built other castles in the area such as Ballysean Castle (Sometimes spelt Ballyshawnmore, Ballysheanmor, Ballyshanemore) near the centre of Gowran, Neigham Castle 4 km from Gowran and Paulstown Castle situated between Gowran and Paulstown 3 km from Gowran.

== Agar Family ==
Following the Cromwellian invasion in Ireland in 1650, Gowran was besieged by Oliver Cromwell. Gowran Castle was attacked and badly damaged. For the following 300 years, the Agar family were a major influence in the Gowran area. Several generations of the Agars occupied Gowran Castle and like the Butlers before them, many of them are buried in St. Mary's Collegiate Church Gowran.

== Time Line ==
- 489 AD - Kings of Ossory referred to as kings of Gowran had a residence in the area
- 754 - Battle of Bealach Gabhrán (Old name for Gowran)
- 938 - Gowran and the area around it was part of the ancient cantreds of Oskelan and Ogenty which formed part of the lands of Ossory. The Gowran area was occupied by the O Dunphy clans. The Mac Giolla Padraig were the chief rulers of Ossory at the time.
- 1169 - After the Norman invasion the Manor of Gowran was 44 000 acres
- 1385 - James Butler, 3rd Earl of Ormond builds a castle close to the town wall and makes it his usual residence.
- 1391 - James Butler, 3rd Earl of Ormond bought Kilkenny Castle and a large part of Kilkenny
- 1501 - Margaret FitzGerald, Countess of Ormond rebuilt Gowran Castle. She also decorated St. Mary's Collegiate Church Gowran.
- 1650 - Oliver Cromwell and his army attacks the Castle and badly damages it.
- 1710 - Lewis Chaigneau, a Dublin merchant owner of Gowran Castle has Gowran and Castle grounds surveyed. In the survey map produced, the castle and the walled town of Gowran are shown
- 1713 - Henry Agar builds a new castle close to the Butler Castle using materials from the former Castle.
- 1747 - Following the death of Henry Agar in 1746 his wife Ann offered for sale stock of Henry Agar decd, sheep, cattle horses, at Castle. Also, colts & fillies got on mares by horses from England. Henry inherited the Gowran Castle estate from his father James Agar in 1733. As a result of his marriage, he acquired an interest in the Ellis family's Dublin property on the River Liffey between Arran Quay and Phoenix Park; this property later passed into the Agar family. He died on 18 November 1746. His widow married 2nd, 20 January 1753, George Dunbar of County Fermanagh, and died on 14 April 1765; she was buried in Christ Church Cathedral, Dublin, on 17 April 1765. Administration of her effects was granted by the Prerogative Court of Armagh to her second husband, on 11 September 1765.
- 1700s - By the end of the 1700s, many of the aristocracy had moved away from Ireland and lived in England following the 1798 rebellion.
- 1816–1819 - Henry Agar 2nd Viscount Clifden rebuilt the Castle (current building) to the designs of William Robertson.
- 1839 - The first Ordnance Survey of Ireland maps show the Gowran Castle Demesne containing 846 Acres, 2 Rood, 10 Perches of land.
- 1840 - Gowran Castle Cricket Club grounds were laid out sometime after 1840 by Lord Clifden. The first recorded cricket match was played there in 1842.
- 1876 - Henry George Agar - Ellis, 4th Viscount Clifden, (Henry George was son of Henry Agar-Ellis, 3rd Viscount Clifden and great-grandson of Henry Wellbore Agar - Ellis 2nd Viscount Clifden) Gowran Castle, is listed in Griffiths Valuation as owning 35,288 acres of land.
- 1900 - Ordnance Survey, showing the Gowran Castle and demesne lands of c.1000 acres, additional lands being added to the estate since the 1839 ordnance surveys.
- 1953 - On 19 February 1953 Thomas Derrig minister for lands was asked a question in Dail Eireann by Mr Crotty regarding the propriety of the Land Commission acquiring the Annaly Estate Gowran County Kilkenny for division. In his reply, the minister said that proceedings were in progress for the acquisition of 774 acres of the estate.
- 1957 - Gowran Castle and c.68 acres of land sold to James and Mary Moran by the Land Commission on 14 May 1957. The Moran family resided in the castle until it was sold in 1998.
- 1998 - Castle and c.65 acres offered for sale on 27 May at public auction. Tarajan Ltd., a company registered in the Isle of Man owned by a Northern Ireland developer Alastair Jackson purchased the property from Kevin Fennelly and Caitriona Fennelly (Nee Moran). Following the sale of the property, applications were made by Tarajan to Kilkenny Co. Council to build houses on the estate.
- 1999 - Planning permission was refused by Kilkenny Co. Council for a housing development consisting of 156 dwellings on the site.
- 2004 - Planning permission was refused for a development which included the change of use of the Castle to a hotel, building 126 residential units, 23 holiday units and other developments.
- 2009 - The castle lay unoccupied and unprotected for the previous eleven years and was falling into dereliction. Concerns were expressed by the Gowran Development Association to the Kilkenny Co. Council and local elected representatives about the rapid deterioration of the Castle and its state of dereliction. At a public meeting in Gowran to discuss the Local Area Plan for Gowran, further concerns were expressed. Following the meeting, a Draft Local Area plan for Gowran was drawn up by Kilkenny Co. Council.
- 2010 - There was a fire in the castle on 16 May 2010. Fortunately, the fire services were quickly alerted. Following their prompt arrival on the scene, the fire was brought quickly under control. Although considerable damage was caused by the fire, the castle was saved from total destruction.

On 20 December 2010 the Local Area Plan for Gowran, was approved by the Kilkenny Co. Council. The plan was drawn up in consultation with local residents of Gowran. The Castle and area surrounding it was designated "Tourism and Amenity". The area surrounding the castle is also an archaeologically sensitive area.

- 2011 - Following the collapse of the Irish economy in 2008, the Castle portfolio was taken over by NAMA.
- 2012 - NAMA appointed Lisney as receivers to the Castle Property Portfolio. The Castle Portfolio was offered for sale after the appointment of Sherry Fitzgerald auctioneers. Kilkenny partners were Mc Creery Auctioneers.
- 2013 - Castle sold. Restoration work begins on the castle.

== See also ==
- St. Mary's Collegiate Church Gowran

The History and Antiquities of the Diocese of Ossory. Vol 3. Rev. Canon William Carrigan 1905
Life Through our Viewfinder. Published by Dalton House Gowran 2009
