= Henry Flood =

18th-century Irish politician

Henry Flood PC
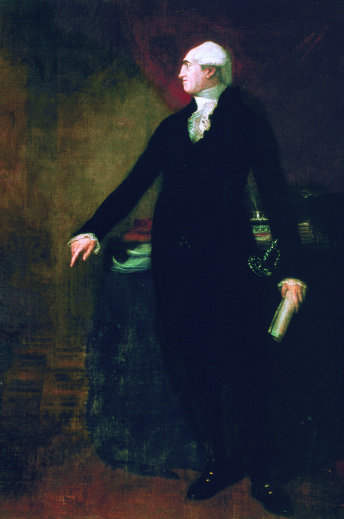
- Portrait by Bartholomew Stoker

Member of Parliament for Seaford
- In office 23 June 1786 – 9 September 1790
- Preceded by: John Henderson
- Succeeded by: John Sargent

Member of Parliament for Winchester
- In office 11 April 1783 – 7 August 1784
- Preceded by: Lovell Stanhope
- Succeeded by: Richard Grace Gamon

Member of Parliament for Kilbeggan
- In office 23 May 1783 – 1 May 1790
- Preceded by: Richard Johnston
- Succeeded by: Thomas Burgh

Member of Parliament for Enniskillen
- In office 11 August 1777 – 23 May 1783
- Preceded by: Archibald Acheson
- Succeeded by: John Blaquiere

Member of Parliament for Longford Borough
- In office 13 June 1768 – 4 February 1769
- Preceded by: Thomas Newcomen
- Succeeded by: Warden Flood

Member of Parliament for Callan
- In office 1 April 1762 – 30 June 1776
- Preceded by: James Agar
- Succeeded by: Pierce Butler

Member of Parliament for County Kilkenny
- In office 7 May 1759 – 11 June 1761
- Preceded by: William Ponsonby
- Succeeded by: William Ponsonby

Personal details
- Born: 15 April 1732 Dublin, Ireland
- Died: 2 December 1791 (aged 59) Farmley, Burnchurch, County Kilkenny, Ireland
- Party: Irish Patriot Party
- Spouse: Lady Frances Beresford (m. 1776)
- Relations: Warden Flood (Father)
- Education: Trinity College, Dublin; Christ Church, Oxford

Henry Flood (15 April 1732 – 2 December 1791) was an Irish politician, statesman, and Lord Chief Justice of the King's Bench for Ireland. He was a leading Irish politician and parliamentarian serving in both the Irish and British parliaments at various stages from 1759 to 1790, and a friend of Henry Grattan, the leader of the Irish Patriot Party. He became an object of public interest in 1770, when he was put on trial for murder, after killing a political rival in a duel.

He was educated at Trinity College, Dublin, and afterwards at Christ Church, Oxford, where he became proficient in the classics. Henry was the son to Warden Flood. He was married to Lady Frances Beresford, daughter of Marcus Beresford, 1st Earl of Tyrone, and Lady Catherine Power, who brought him a large fortune.

== Irish Parliament ==
In 1759, he entered the Irish parliament as member for County Kilkenny, a seat he held until 1761. There was at that time no party in the Irish House of Commons that could truly be called national, and until a few years before there had been none that deserved even the name of opposition. The Irish parliament was still constitutionally subordinate to the English privy council; it had practically no powers of independent legislation, and none of controlling the policy of the executive, which was nominated by the ministers in London. Though the majority of the people were Roman Catholics, no person of that faith could either enter parliament or exercise the franchise; the penal code, which made it almost impossible for a Roman Catholic to hold property, to follow a learned profession, or even to educate his children, and which in numerous particulars pressed severely on the Roman Catholics and subjected them to degrading conditions, was as yet un-repealed, though in practice largely obsolete; the industry and commerce of Ireland were throttled by restrictions imposed, in accordance with the economic theories of the period, in the interest of the rival trade of Great Britain. Men like Anthony Malone and Hely-Hutchinson fully realised the necessity for far-reaching reforms; and it only needed the ability and eloquence of Flood in the Irish House of Commons to raise up an independent party in parliament, and to create in the country a public opinion with definite intelligible aims.

The chief objects for which Flood strove were the shortening of the duration of parliament which had then no legal limit in Ireland except that of the reigning sovereign's life, the reduction of the scandalously heavy pension list, the establishment of a national militia, and, above all, the complete legislative independence of the Irish parliament. For some years little was accomplished; but in 1768 the English ministry, which had special reasons at the moment for avoiding unpopularity in Ireland, allowed an octennial bill (limiting the term of parliament to eight years) to pass, which was the first step towards making the Irish House of Commons in some measure representative of public opinion.

It had become the practice to allow crown patronage in Ireland to be exercised by the owners of parliamentary boroughs in return for their undertaking to manage the House in the government interest. But during the vice-royalty of Lord Townshend the aristocracy, and more particularly these undertakers as they were called, were made to understand that for the future their privileges in this respect would be curtailed. When, therefore, an opportunity was taken by the government in 1768 for reasserting the constitutional subordination of the Irish parliament, these powerful classes were thrown into a temporary alliance with Flood. In the following year, in accordance with the established procedure, a money bill was sent over by the privy council in London for acceptance by the Irish House of Commons. It was rejected, but a reason for this course was assigned; namely, that the bill had not originated in the Irish House. In consequence, parliament was peremptorily prorogued, and a recess of fourteen months was employed by the government in securing a majority by the most extensive corruption. Nevertheless, when parliament met in February 1771 another money bill was thrown out on the motion of Flood; and the next year Lord Townshend, the lord lieutenant whose policy had provoked this conflict, was recalled. The struggle was the occasion of a publication, famous in its day, called Baratariana, to which Flood contributed a series of powerful letters after the manner of Junius, one of his collaborators being Henry Grattan.

The success which had thus far attended Flood's efforts had placed him in a position such as no Irish politician had previously attained. He had, as an eminent historian of Ireland observes, "proved himself beyond all comparison the greatest popular orator that his country had yet produced, and also a consummate master of parliamentary tactics. Under parliamentary conditions that were exceedingly unfavourable, and in an atmosphere charged with corruption, venality and subservience, he had created a party before which ministers had begun to quail, and had inoculated the Protestant constituencies with a genuine spirit of liberty and self-reliance." Lord Harcourt, who succeeded Townshend as viceroy, saw that Flood must be conciliated at any price "rather than risk the opposition of so formidable a leader." Even his trial for the murder of his long-time enemy James Agar in 1770 did nothing to damage his career or his reputation. Found guilty of the lesser crime of manslaughter, he was spared a prison sentence, and the episode is said to have made duelling more rather than less respectable.

Flood represented Callan between 1762 and 1776, where he had a bitter feud with the Agar family, whose effective head James Agar he killed in a duel, and Longford Borough between 1768 and 1769. Accordingly, in 1775, he was offered and accepted a seat, in the Privy Council of Ireland and the office of vice-treasurer with a salary of £3500 a year. For this step, he has been severely criticized. Flood may reasonably have held that he had a better prospect of advancing his policy by the leverage of a ministerial position. The result, however, was that the leadership of the national party passed from Flood to Grattan, who entered the Irish parliament in the same session that Flood became a minister.

Flood continued in office for nearly seven years. Re-elected for Enniskillen in 1777, he necessarily remained silent on the subject of the independence of the Irish parliament, and had to be content with advocating minor reforms as occasion offered. He was instrumental in obtaining bounties on the export of Irish corn to foreign, countries and other commercial concessions. On the other hand, he failed to procure the passing of a Habeas corpus bill and a bill for making the judges irremovable, while his support of Lord North's American policy gravely injured his popularity and reputation.

An important event in 1778 led indirectly to his recovering to some extent his former position in the country; this was the alliance of France with the revolted American colonies. Ireland was thereby placed in peril of a French invasion, while the English government could provide no troops to defend the island. A volunteer movement was then set on foot to meet the emergency; in a few weeks more than 40,000 men were under arms, officered by the country gentry, and controlled by Lord Charlemont. This volunteer force, in which Flood was a colonel soon made itself felt in politics.

A Volunteer Convention, formed with all the regular organisation of a representative assembly, but wielding the power of an army, began menacingly to demand the removal of the commercial restrictions which were destroying Irish prosperity. Under this pressure the government gave way; the whole colonial trade was in 1779 thrown open to Ireland for the first time, and other concessions were also extorted. Flood, who had taken an active though not a leading part in this movement, now at last resigned his office to rejoin his old party. He found to his chagrin that his former services had been to a great extent forgotten and that he was eclipsed by Grattan.

When in a debate on the constitutional question in 1779 Flood complained of the small consideration shown him in relation to a subject which he had been the first to agitate, he was reminded that by the civil law if a man should separate from his wife and abandon her for seven years, another might then take her and give her his protection. But though Flood had lost control of the movement for independence of the Irish parliament, the agitation, backed as it now was by the Volunteer Convention and by increasing signs of popular disaffection, led at last in 1782 to the concession of the demand, together with a number of other important reforms.

Soon after this development, a further issue emerged, known as the “Simple Repeal” controversy. The debate centered on whether England, in addition to repealing the statutes that had established the subordination of the Irish Parliament, should also formally renounce any future claim to exercise control over Irish legislation. The principal historical significance of this dispute lies in its role in contributing to a breakdown in relations between Flood and Grattan, who subsequently criticized each other in the House of Commons.

In 1783, Flood was again returned to the house, this time for Kilbeggan. His view prevailed for a Renunciation Act such as he advocated was ungrudgingly passed by the English parliament of the same year and for a time he regained popularity at the expense of his rival. Flood next (28 November 1783) introduced a reform bill, after first submitting it to the Volunteer Convention.

The bill, which contained no provision for giving the franchise to Roman Catholics, which Flood always opposed, was rejected, ostensibly on the ground that the attitude of the volunteers threatened the freedom of parliament. The volunteers were perfectly loyal to the crown and the connection with England. They carried an address to the king, moved by Flood, expressing the hope that their support of parliamentary reform might be imputed to nothing but a sober and laudable desire to uphold the constitution and to perpetuate the cordial union of both kingdoms. The convention then dissolved, but Flood had desired, in opposition to Grattan, to continue it as a means of putting pressure on parliament for the purpose of obtaining reform.

In Dublin, he was a member of Daly's Club.

== British Parliament ==
In 1776, Flood had made an attempt to enter the British House of Commons. In 1783, he tried again, this time successfully. He purchased a seat for Winchester from the duke of Chandos, and for the next seven years he was a member at the same time of both the British and Irish parliaments. He unsuccessfully reintroduced, his reform bill in the Irish House in 1784; supported the movement for protecting Irish industries; but short-sightedly opposed Pitt's commercial propositions in 1785. He remained a firm opponent of Roman Catholic emancipation, even defending the penal laws on the ground that were introduced after the Revolution, they were not laws of persecution but of political necessity; after 1786, he does not appear to have attended the parliament in Dublin.

In the House at Westminster, where he refused to enroll himself as a member of either political party, he was not successful: Grattan remarked that Flood, at fifty, was too old a tree to be transplanted. His first speech, in opposition to Charles James Fox's India Bill on 3 December 1783, disappointed the expectations aroused by his celebrity. His speech in opposition to the commercial treaty with France in 1787 was, however, well received; and in 1790 he introduced a reform bill which Fox declared to be the best scheme of reform that had yet been proposed, and which in Edmund Burke's opinion retrieved Flood's reputation. But at the dissolution in the same year, he lost his seat in both parliaments, and he then retired to Farmley, his residence in County Kilkenny, where he remained until his death. He and Frances, who survived until 1815, had no children, and his property passed to a cousin, John Flood; a large bequest to Trinity College Dublin was declared invalid.

Parliament of Ireland
| Preceded by William Ponsonby, Viscount Duncannon; Patrick Wemys | Member of Parliament for County Kilkenny; 1759–1761; With: Patrick Wemys | Succeeded by Hon. John Ponsonby; James Agar |
| Preceded by Patrick Wemys; James Agar | Member of Parliament for Callan; 1762–1776; With: Patrick Wemys 1762; James Wemys 1762–1765; Jocelyn Flood 1765–1767; John Flood 1767–1776; Hercules Langrishe 1776 | Succeeded by Pierce Butler; George Agar |
| Preceded by Sir Thomas Newcomen, 8th Bt; Joseph Henry | Member of Parliament for Longford Borough; 1768–1769; With: David La Touche | Succeeded by Warden Flood; David La Touche |
| Preceded by Sir Archibald Acheson, 6th Bt; John Leigh | Member of Parliament for Enniskillen; 1777–1783; With: John Leigh | Succeeded by Sir John Blaquiere; John McClintock |
| Preceded by Sir Richard Johnston, 1st Bt; Charles Lambart | Member of Parliament for Kilbeggan; 1783–1790; With: John Philpot Curran | Succeeded by Thomas Burgh; William Sherlock |
Parliament of Great Britain
| Preceded by Lovell Stanhope; Henry Penton | Member of Parliament for Winchester; 1783 – 1784; With: Henry Penton | Succeeded by Richard Grace Gamon; Henry Penton |
| Preceded by Sir Peter Parker; Sir John Henderson | Member of Parliament for Seaford; 1786 – 1790; With: Sir Godfrey Webster | Succeeded by John Sargent; Richard Paul Jodrell |
