= Jack Hickey (Australian rules footballer) =

Australian rules footballer (1930–2018)

Personal information
- Full name: Victor John Leo Hickey
- Born: 13 December 1930
- Died: 13 September 2018 (aged 87)
- Original team: Abbotsford
- Height: 173 cm (5 ft 8 in)
- Weight: 69 kg (152 lb)

Playing career^{1}
Years	Club	Games (Goals)
1951–1956	Collingwood	72 (15)
- ^{1} Playing statistics correct to the end of 1956.

Victor John Leo Hickey (13 December 1930 – 13 September 2018) was an Australian rules footballer who played in the Victorian Football League (VFL).

He was 19th man for Collingwood when the Magpies was defeated by Melbourne in the 1955 Grand Final.
