= Archdeacon of Emly =

The Archdeacon of Emly was a senior ecclesiastical officer in the Diocese of Emly and its successor amalgamated dioceses.

Notable archdeacons included Garrett FitzGerald, Archdeacon 1615–38, John Hickey, Archdeacon for more than 40 years until his death in 1723, Edward Moore (Archdeacon 1782–1788), Charles Agar (died 1789), John Jebb, later Bishop of Limerick, Ardfert and Aghadoe, who was Archdeacon 1821–3, and Henry Irwin, Archdeacon 1843–1858.
