= St Austell by-election =

St Austell by-election may refer to:

- 1887 St Austell by-election
- 1908 St Austell by-election
- 1915 St Austell by-election
