= Colman Rashleigh =

English politician (1819–1896)

Sir Colman Rashleigh, Bt CB DL

Member of Parliament for East Cornwall
- In office 1874–1880 Serving with John Tremayne
- Preceded by: Edward Brydges Willyams; Sir John Salusbury-Trelawny, Bt
- Succeeded by: William Copeland Borlase; Thomas Agar-Robartes

Personal details
- Born: 4 May 1819 Rickmansworth, Herefordshire, England
- Died: 27 October 1896 (aged 77)
- Party: Liberal
- Spouse: Mary Anne Kendall (m. 1845; died 1893)
- Relations: Robert Williams (grandfather)
- Children: 4
- Parent(s): Sir John Rashleigh, Bt; Harriet Williams Rashleigh
- Education: Eton College; Trinity College, Cambridge

Sir Colman Rashleigh, 2nd Baronet CB DL (4 May 1819 – 27 October 1896) was an English Liberal Party politician.

== Early life ==
Rashleigh was born on 4 May 1819 at Rickmansworth in Hertfordshire, England. He was the eldest son of the former Harriet Williams (d. 1831) and Sir John Colman Rashleigh, 1st Baronet (1772–1847), who was created a Baronet of Prideaux on 30 September 1831 when Colman was 12 years old.

His paternal grandparents were Katherine (née Battie) Rashleigh (daughter and co-heir of William Battie, Esq. M.D.) and John Rashleigh, Esq. of Penquite, the first Commissioner and Receiver for Greenwich Hospital. The Rashleigh family had been settled in Cornwall since at least the early part of the 16th century. His maternal grandfather was Robert Williams, Esq. of Bridehead in County Durham MP.

Rashleigh was educated at Eton and Trinity College, Cambridge, graduating with a B.A. in 1843.

== Career ==
Rashleigh held a number of public offices in Cornwall including a Justice of the Peace (JP), Deputy Lieutenant of Cornwall, High Sheriff of Cornwall in 1852 and Deputy-Warden of the Stannaries. He was a Member of Parliament (MP) for East Cornwall from 1874 to 1880.

He was also invested as a Companion, Order of the Bath (CB) and gained the rank of Honorary Colonel in the service of the Cornwall and Devon Miners' Artillery.

== Personal life ==
On 1 May 1845, Rashleigh married Mary Anne Kendall (1823–1893), the only daughter of Nicholas Kendall of Pelyn MP and Mary Anne Wymond. Her brother was the Rev. Francis Kendall of Lanlivery. Together, they had four children:

- Sir Colman Battie Rashleigh, 3rd Baronet (1846–1907), who married, firstly, Geraldine Frances Walpole, daughter of Lt. Gen. Sir Robert Walpole, in 1872. He married, secondly, Amy Young Jamieson, daughter of James Young Jamieson, Esq., in 1878.
- Reverend John Kendall Rashleigh (1847–1933), the Rector of St Mabyn in Cornwall who married, firstly, Charlotte Jane Rashleigh, daughter of Charles Edward Rashleigh, in 1871. He married, secondly, Charlotte Maria Hodgson, daughter of Sir Arthur Hodgson, in 1876.
- Harriett Rashleigh (b. c. 1850)
- Mary Rashleigh (1852–1900), who married her brother's brother-in-law, Col. Henry James Young Jamieson, son of James Young Jamieson.

In 1851 he resided at Great Prideaux, Luxulyan, Cornwall. Lady Rashleigh died at the Mayoralty in Bodmin on 6 August 1893 and Sir Colman died on 27 October 1896.

Parliament of the United Kingdom
Preceded by Edward Brydges Willyams; Sir John Salusbury-Trelawny, Bt	Member of Parliament for East Cornwall; 1874 – 1880; With: John Tremayne	Succeeded by William Copeland Borlase; Thomas Agar-Robartes
Baronetage of the United Kingdom
Preceded by John Colman Rashleigh	Baronet (of Prideaux); 1847–1896	Succeeded by Colman Battie Rashleigh
