= Layland-Barratt baronets =

Extinct baronetcy in the Baronetage of the United Kingdom

Arms of Layland-Barratt of the Manor House and of Tregarne Lodge

The Layland-Barratt baronetcy, of the Manor House in the Borough of Torquay and of Tregarne Lodge in the Parish of St Austell in the County of Cornwall, was a title in the Baronetage of the United Kingdom. It was created on 23 July 1908 for Francis Layland-Barratt, Member of Parliament for Torquay and St Austell. The title became extinct on the death of 2nd Baronet in 1968.

== Layland-Barratt baronets, of the Manor House and of Tregarne Lodge (1908) ==
- Sir Francis Layland-Barratt, 1st Baronet (1860–1933)
- Sir Francis Henry Godolphin Layland-Barratt, 2nd Baronet (1896–1968), who left no heir.

Baronetage of the United Kingdom
Preceded by Kearley baronets	Layland-Barratt baronets of the Manor House and of Tregarne Lodge; 23 July 1908	Succeeded by Perks baronets
