= Thomas Agar-Robartes, 6th Viscount Clifden =

British politician

The Right Honourable The Viscount Clifden
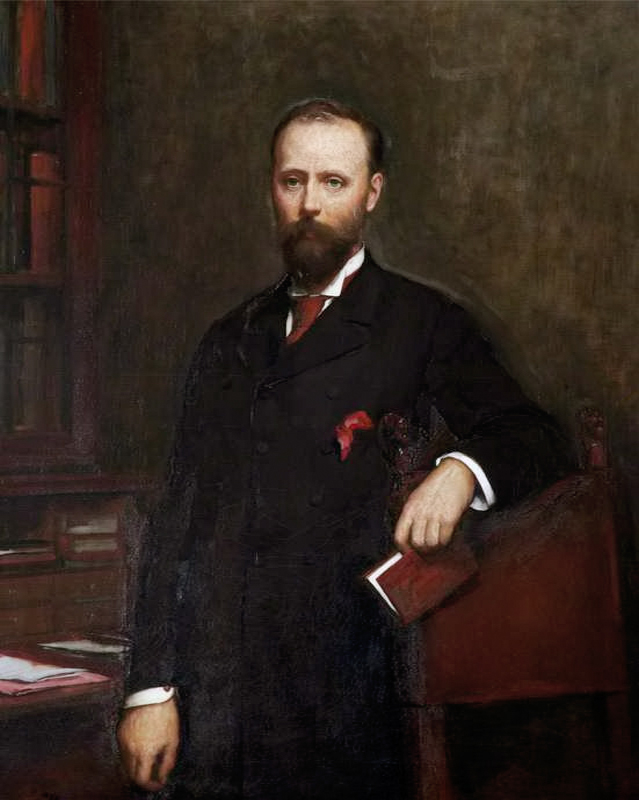
- Lord Clifden by Walter William Ouless, 1887.

Lord-Lieutenant of Cambridgeshire
- In office 1906–1915
- Monarchs: Edward VII; George V
- Preceded by: Alexander Peckover
- Succeeded by: Charles Adeane

Personal details
- Born: 1 January 1844 Grosvenor Place, London
- Died: 19 July 1930 (aged 86)
- Party: Liberal
- Spouse(s): Mary Dickenson (died 1921)
- Education: Christ Church, Oxford

Thomas Charles Agar-Robartes, 6th Viscount Clifden (1 January 1844 – 19 July 1930), styled The Honourable Thomas Agar-Robartes between 1869 and 1882 and known as The Lord Robartes from 1882 to 1899, was a British landowner and Liberal politician.

== Background and education ==
Agar-Robartes was born at Grosvenor Place, London, the son of Thomas Agar-Robartes, 1st Baron Robartes, and Juliana Pole-Carew, daughter of Reginald Pole-Carew, of East Antony, Cornwall. He was educated at Harrow and Christ Church, Oxford, and was called to the Bar at the Middle Temple in 1870.

On the death of his father in 1882 he inherited the Lanhydrock estate in Cornwall and arranged for Lanhydrock House to be rebuilt following a fire in 1881 that had killed his mother. He and his family were to live there from 1885.

== Public life ==
In 1880 Agar-Robartes was returned to Parliament as one of two representatives for Cornwall East, a seat he held until 1882, when he succeeded his father in the barony and entered the House of Lords. On 10 September 1899 he also succeeded his kinsman as sixth Viscount Clifden.

In 1891, as chairman of the Agar-Robartes Bank, he took over the ownership of Wimpole Hall in Cambridgeshire from Charles Yorke, 5th Earl of Hardwicke in payment of debts. After a few years, it was leased out. He later served as Lord-Lieutenant of Cambridgeshire from 1906 to 1915.

== Family ==
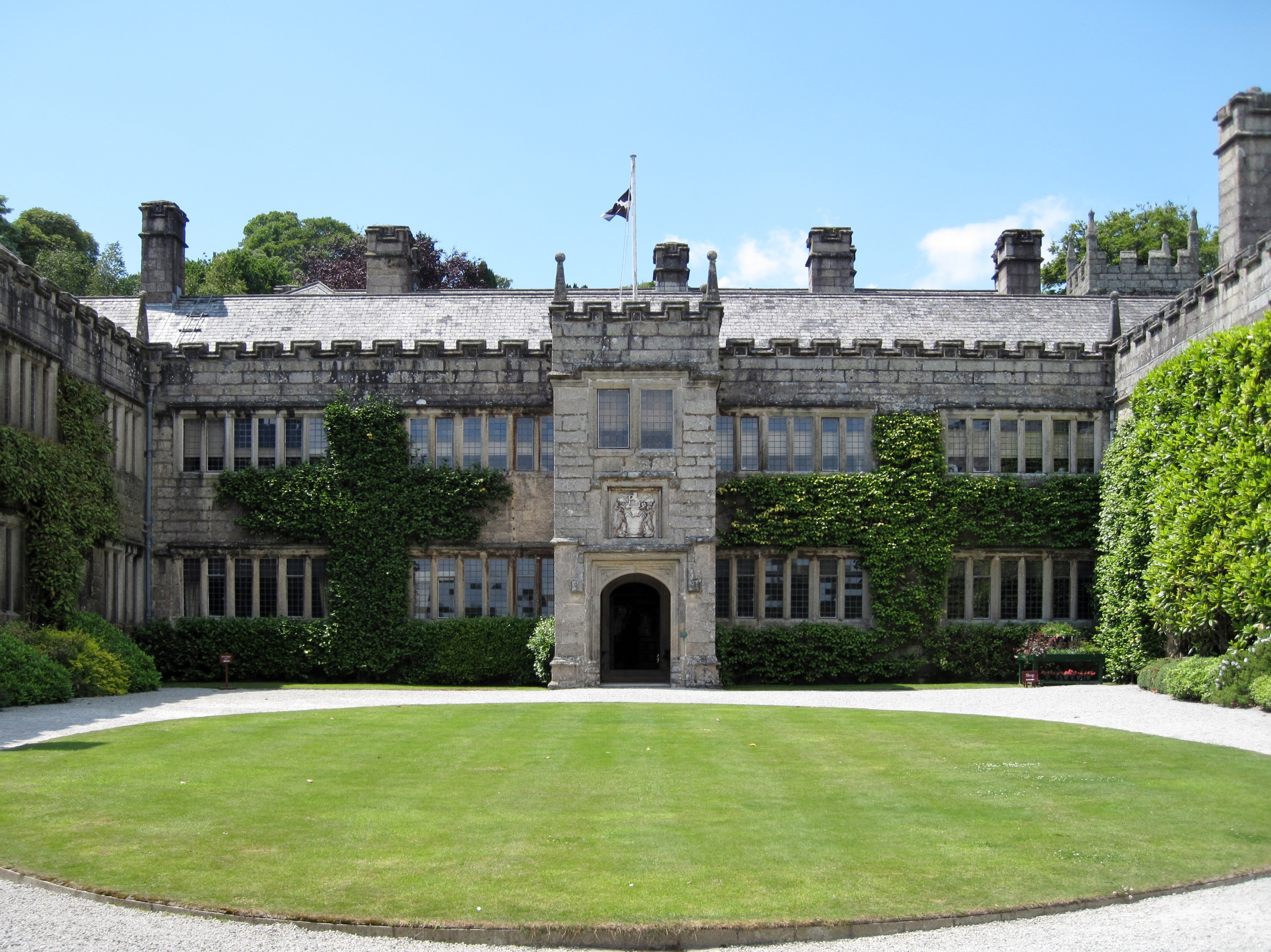
Lanhydrock House

Lord Clifden married Mary Dickinson, daughter of Francis Henry Dickinson, of Kingweston House, Somerset, in 1878. They had ten children, of whom one died in infancy. Their eldest son the Honourable Thomas Agar-Robartes (had a twin sister) was also a Liberal politician, killed in World War I.

Lady Clifden died in January 1921. Lord Clifden survived her by nine years and died in July 1930, aged 86. He was buried at Lanhydrock House, Cornwall. He was succeeded in his titles by his second but eldest surviving son Francis.

Parliament of the United Kingdom
Preceded by Sir Colman Rashleigh, Bt; John Tremayne	Member of Parliament for Cornwall East; 1880–1882; With: William Copeland Borlase	Succeeded by William Copeland Borlase; Charles Dyke Acland
Honorary titles
Preceded by Alexander Peckover	Lord-Lieutenant of Cambridgeshire; 1906–1915	Succeeded by Charles Adeane
Peerage of Ireland
Preceded by Leopold George Frederick Agar-Ellis	Viscount Clifden; 1899–1930	Succeeded by Francis Gerald Agar-Robartes
Peerage of the United Kingdom
Preceded by Thomas James Agar-Robartes	Baron Robartes; 1882–1930	Succeeded by Francis Gerald Agar-Robartes
