= John Rashleigh =

John Rashleigh may refer to:

- John Rashleigh (1554–1624) of Menabilly, MP for Fowey in 1588 and 1597, and High Sheriff of Cornwall in 1608
- John Rashleigh (1619–1693) of Coombe, MP for Fowey from 1661 to 1679
- John Colman Rashleigh (1772–1847), High Sheriff of Cornwall
