= John Colman Rashleigh =

British baronet

Sir John Rashleigh, Bt

High Sheriff of Cornwall
- In office 1813–1814
- Preceded by: John Vivian
- Succeeded by: Sir Rose Price, 1st Baronet

Personal details
- Born: John Colman Rashleigh; 23 November 1772
- Died: 4 August 1847 (aged 74)
- Spouse(s): Harriet Williams (m. 1808; died 1831) Martha Gould (m. 1833)
- Relations: Jonathan Rashleigh (grandfather); William Battie (grandfather); William Rashleigh (cousin)
- Parent(s): John Rashleigh; Katherine Battie Rashleigh

Sir John Colman Rashleigh, 1st Baronet (23 November 1772 – 4 August 1847) was the first of the Rashleigh baronets and known as a leading figure among the gentry in the parliamentary reform movement.

== Early life ==
John Colman was born on 23 November 1772 into the prominent Cornwall Rashleigh family and was 17th in direct descent from Edward I, King of England. He was the eldest son of John Rashleigh (1742–1803) and the former Katherine Battie (d. 1800), and had three brothers and three sisters. His family lived at Penquite House, a two storey, five bay house near Golant that was designed by George Wightwick.

His paternal grandparents were Jonathan Rashleigh (a son of Jonathan Rashleigh) and Mary (née Clayton) Rashleigh (a daughter of Sir William Clayton, 1st Baronet). His uncle, Philip Rashleigh died without issue, so his cousin, William Rashleigh, MP for Fowey, inherited the Rashleigh family estates, including Menabilly. His maternal grandfather was Dr. William Battie, president of the Royal College of Physicians.

== Career ==
Rashleigh, who was referred to as a radical, was active in pro-Catholic politics for many years, and was known as a leading figure among the gentry in the parliamentary reform movement. in 1820, he wrote an open letter to Prime Minister George Canning regarding Canning's "laboured and volunteer attack on the Friends of Parliamentary Reform."

After Rashleigh had been awarded his baronetcy, he "acknowledged that the peers had a 'valuable' constitutional role to play, as a 'patrician barrier' between the pretensions of the crown and 'popular passions and caprice', but they were now opposed to both and had forgotten that their privileges were 'a trust for the benefit of the people'."

He was High Sheriff of Cornwall in 1813. On 30 September 1831, he was created Rashleigh Baronet of Prideaux, by Lord Grey's government.

== Personal life ==
On 24 May 1808, he married Harriet Williams (1777-1832), a daughter of banker and politician Robert Williams, Esq. of Bridehead near Dorchester MP and his wife Jane Chassereau, daughter of the successful Huguenot fanmaker François/Francis Chassereau and Anne Johannot, also of Huguenot refugee parents. Harriet’s elder brother was Robert Williams, Tory MP for Dorchester. and her younger brother William Williams (Weymouth MP) was Whig MP for Weymouth and Melcombe Regis.

Before Harriet’s death on 7 July 1832, they were the parents of four children:

- Battie Rashleigh (1811–1822), who died young.
- Jane Rashleigh (b. 1809)
- Harriet Anne Rashleigh (b. 1812)
- Sir Colman Rashleigh, 2nd Baronet (1819–1896), who married Mary Anne Kendall (1823–1893), the only daughter of Nicholas Kendall of Pelyn.

On 17 October 1833, he married, secondly, Martha Gould. She was the youngest daughter of John Gould MD of Truro. They had no children together.

Sir John died on 4 August 1847 and was succeeded in the baronetcy by his eldest son, Colman. The Dowager Lady Rashleigh died 9 June 1879, aged 98, and left her estate to her nephew John Nutcombe Gould (father of James Nutcombe Gould) and his wife Katherine (née Grant) Gould (a daughter of Maj. Gen. James Grant).

Baronetage of the United Kingdom
New creation	Baronet (of Prideaux); 1831–1847	Succeeded by Colman Rashleigh
