= Sir Thomas Dyke Acland, 12th Baronet =

British politician, landowner and Barrister-at-Law

Ackland in the 1870s.

Arms of Acland: Chequy argent and sable, a fesse gules

1924 memorial window in Selworthy Church, Somerset, dedicated to the 12th Baronet and his wife Gertrude Walrond. The arms describe his education, ancestry and marriage

Sir Charles Thomas Dyke Acland, 12th Baronet, DL, JP (16 July 1842 – 18 February 1919), of Killerton in Devon and of Holnicote in the parish of Selworthy in Somerset, was a large landowner and a British politician and Barrister-at-Law. He was known to family and friends as "Charlie", but demanded to be known in public as "Sir Thomas", not only because that was the traditional name of the Aclands, there having been a "Sir Thomas Acland" at Killerton for 170 years, but also because following the creation of a second and much newer Acland Baronetcy ("of St Mary Magdalen in Oxford") in 1890, for his uncle Sir Henry Wentworth Acland, 1st Baronet (the fourth son of the tenth Baronet), he wished people to know "which was the real head and owner of Killerton".

== Origins ==
Born in Queen Anne Street in London, he was the son of Sir Thomas Dyke Acland, 11th Baronet and Mary Mordaunt.

== Education ==
Dyke Acland was educated at Eton College in Berkshire and at Christ Church, Oxford, where he graduated with a Bachelor of Arts in 1866 and a Master of Arts in 1868.

== Career ==
In 1869 he was called to the Bar by the Inner Temple. In 1898 he succeeded to his father's baronetcy. He served in the 1st Devon Yeomanry Cavalry, reaching the rank of lieutenant-colonel. He was Deputy Warden of the Stannaries and Liberal Member of Parliament (MP) for East Cornwall from 1882 to 1885 and for Launceston from 1885 to 1892. In 1886, he was Church-estates Commissioner and Parliamentary Secretary to the Board of Trade. Dyke Acland was a Deputy Lieutenant of Somerset and Devon and a Justice of Peace for Somerset and Devon. In 1903, he became High Sheriff of Devon.

== Marriage ==
On 1 November 1879 in All Saints' Chapel in Uffculme, he married Gertrude Walrond, a daughter of Sir John Walrond, 1st Baronet, of Bradfield House, Uffculme in Devon, The marriage was childless.

== Gift to National Trust ==
In February 1917 he granted a 500-year lease of almost 8,000 acres of the picturesque and virtually pristine Holnicote Estate on Exmoor, "one of the most beautiful pieces of wild country to be found in England" to the National Trust, in order to preserve it from future development. This more than doubled the extent of the lands controlled by the National Trust, then only recently created. His brother and successor Arthur and nephew Francis, 13th & 14th Baronets respectively, co-operated in the negotiations concerning the gift. The lease was converted into an outright gift 35 years later by his great-nephew Sir Richard Thomas Dyke Acland, 15th Baronet (1906-1990), who also donated Killerton.

== Death and succession ==
He died childless and was succeeded by his younger brother Sir Arthur Dyke Acland, 13th Baronet (1847-1926).

Parliament of the United Kingdom
Preceded by Thomas Agar-Robartes; William Copeland Borlase	Member of Parliament for East Cornwall; 1882–1885; With: William Copeland Borlase	Constituency abolished
Preceded by Richard Webster	Member of Parliament for Launceston; 1885–1892	Succeeded by Thomas Owen
Church of England titles
Preceded by Sir Henry Selwin-Ibbetson	Second Church Estates Commissioner; 1886	Succeeded by Sir Henry Selwin-Ibbetson
Non-profit organization positions
Preceded by William Douglas Morrison	President of the Churchmen's Union; 1908–1915	Succeeded by Percy Gardner
Baronetage of England
Preceded by Thomas Dyke Acland	Baronet (of St Columb John); 1898–1919	Succeeded by Arthur Dyke Acland
