= William Borlase =

18th-century English antiquary and naturalist

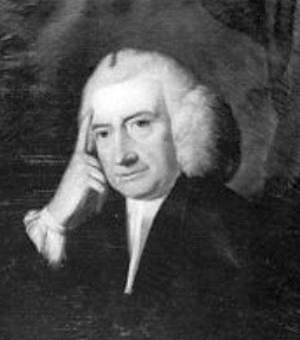
- Born: 2 February 1696; Pendeen, Cornwall, England
- Died: 31 August 1772 (aged 76); Ludgvan, Cornwall, England
- Education: Exeter College, Oxford
- Scientific career
- Fields: Geologist, naturalist, antiquary

William Borlase (2 February 1696 – 31 August 1772), was a Cornish antiquary, geologist and naturalist. From 1722, he was Rector of Ludgvan, Cornwall, where he died. He is remembered for his works The Antiquities of Cornwall (1754; 2nd ed., 1769) and The Natural History of Cornwall (1758), although his plans for a parish-by-parish county history were abandoned.

== Life and works ==
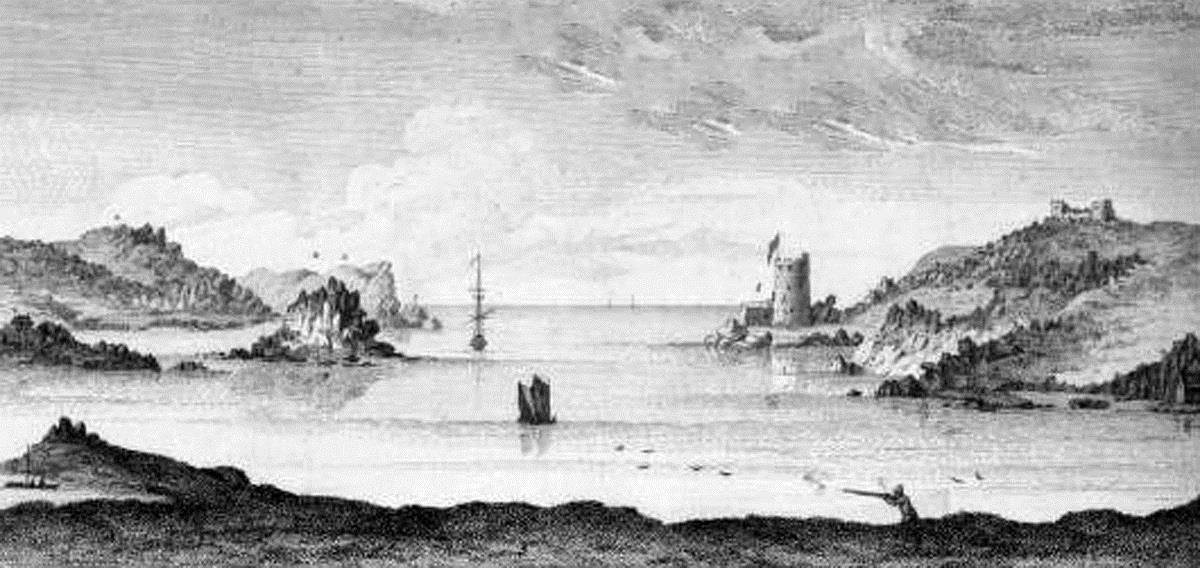
New Grimsby harbour, from Observations on the Ancient and Present State of the Islands of Scilly, and their Importance to the Trade of Great Britain

Borlase was born on 2 February 1695/6 at Pendeen, of an ancient family originating at St Wenn. He was educated at Exeter College, Oxford, from 1713, and in 1719 he was ordained. In 1722 he was presented to the rectory of Ludgvan, and in 1732 he obtained in addition the vicarage of St Just, his native parish. The garden of the Rectory (now known as Hogus House) was established by Borlase; during the reign of Queen Victoria the garden was further developed by a successor, Arthur Boscawen, and was known for its fine collection of trees and shrubs.

Between 1744 and 1746, Borlase was active against the Methodist preachers in his capacity of magistrate. Various Methodist preachers were seized on warrants issued by him and press-ganged to serve on Royal Navy ships abroad. In John Wesley's Diary there is an account of how Borlase personally laid hands on Wesley, "to serve his majesty", but withdrew when he realised that Wesley was a gentleman.

In the parish of Ludgvan were rich copper works, abounding with mineral and metallic fossils, of which he made a collection, and thus was led to study somewhat minutely the natural history of Cornwall. In 1750, he was admitted a Fellow of the Royal Society; and in 1754 he published, at Oxford, his Antiquities of Cornwall (2nd ed., London, 1769). His next publication was Observations on the Ancient and Present State of the Islands of Scilly, and their Importance to the Trade of Great Britain (Oxford, 1756). In 1758 there appeared his Natural History of Cornwall which includes a chapter on the inhabitants and their native language (about one ninth of the whole).

He presented to the Ashmolean Museum, Oxford, a variety of fossils and antiquities, which he had described in his works, and received the thanks of the university and the degree of Doctor of Civil Law. Borlase was well acquainted with most of the leading literary men of the time, particularly with Alexander Pope, with whom he kept up a long correspondence, and for whose grotto at Twickenham he furnished the greater part of the fossils and minerals. He also sent collections of mineral and fossil specimens to Dr William Oliver and to a number of natural historians in Europe. Borlase also published the first scientific study of the 1761 Lisbon earthquake by recording its effects and tsunami.

== Family and character ==
In 1724, William Borlase married Anne Smith. The couple had six sons, of whom two died in infancy. Of the remaining four, three became churchmen. Anne Borlase died in 1769. Borlase's elder brother was Walter Borlase, who served as vicar of Madron, and also as mayor of Penzance. His great-great-grandson was William Copeland Borlase (1848–1899), an antiquarian who was influenced by his ancestor's archaeological work.

Borlase was a conscientious minister to his parishioners, politically conservative, and an amateur painter. Some of his papers are preserved in Penzance at the Morrab Library.

== Publications ==
- Borlase, William (1754) Observations on the Antiquities of Cornwall. Oxford: Printed by W. Jackson. [click on Télécharger 24.pdf to download].
  2nd edition (1769): Antiquities, Historical and Monumental of the County of Cornwall. Printed by W. Bowyer and J. Nichols, for S. Baker & G. Leigh, T. Payne, B. White, London. Reprinted in 1973; London: E & W Books, ISBN 0-85409-852-6
- Borlase, William (1756) Observations on the Ancient and Present State of the Islands of Scilly, and their Importance to the Trade of Great Britain. Oxford: W. Jackson
- Borlase, William (1758) Natural History of Cornwall ... Oxford: printed for the author; by W. Jackson: sold by W. Sandby, at the Ship in Fleet-Street London; and the booksellers of Oxford

== Bibliography ==
- Tregellas, Walter Hawken (1886). "Borlase, William" . In Stephen, Leslie (ed.). Dictionary of National Biography. Vol. 5. London: Smith, Elder & Co.
- Borlase, William (1803). "Memoirs [1772]". The Gentleman's Magazine. 1st ser. 73: 1114–17.
- Haycock, David Boyd (2006) [2004]. "Borlase, William (1696–1772)". Oxford Dictionary of National Biography (online ed.). Oxford University Press. doi:10.1093/ref:odnb/2910. (Subscription, Wikipedia Library access or UK public library membership required.)
- Pool, P. A. S. (1970). "William Borlase, 1696–1772". In Borlase, William (ed.). The Antiquities of Cornwall. London: E & W Books. pp. 17–22.
- Pool, P. A. S. (1978). "William Borlase". In Simmons, Jack (ed.). English County Historians: first series. Wakefield: EP Publishing. pp. 83–110. ISBN 0-7158-1309-9.
- Pool, P. A. S. (1986). William Borlase. Truro: Royal Institution of Cornwall.
