= Thomas Agar-Robartes =

British politician

Thomas Agar-Robartes MP, circa 1906

Thomas Charles Reginald Agar-Robartes (known as Tommy) (22 May 1880 – 30 September 1915) was a British Liberal politician.

== Background and education ==
Tommy Agar-Robartes was the eldest son and heir of Thomas Agar-Robartes, 6th Viscount Clifden, and his wife Mary (née Dickenson) and was brought up at Lanhydrock House, Bodmin. He was the eldest of ten (including a twin sister). Educated at Oxford and a keen horseman, he played in the Oxford University polo team that beat Cambridge in 1903.

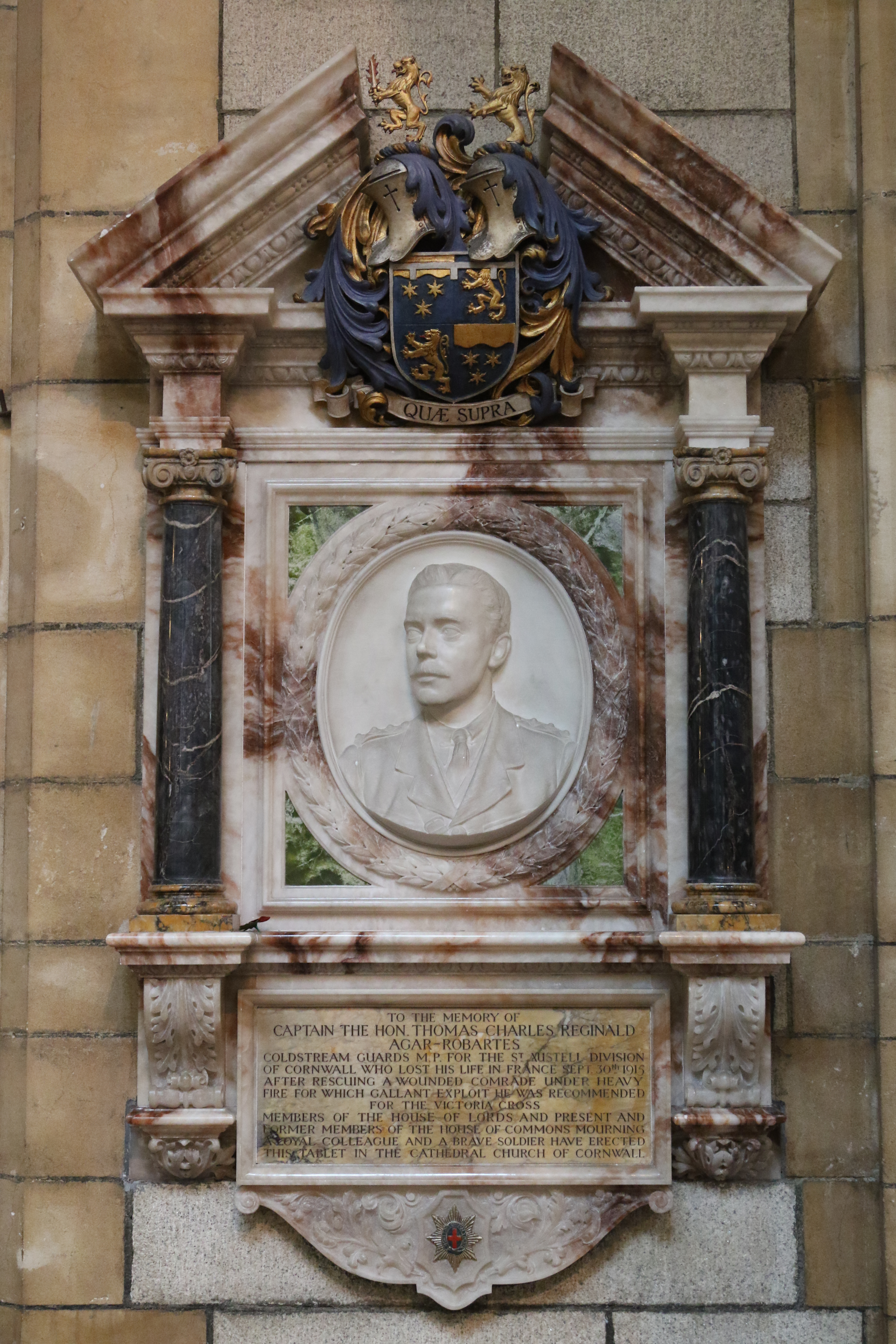
Memorial in Truro Cathedral

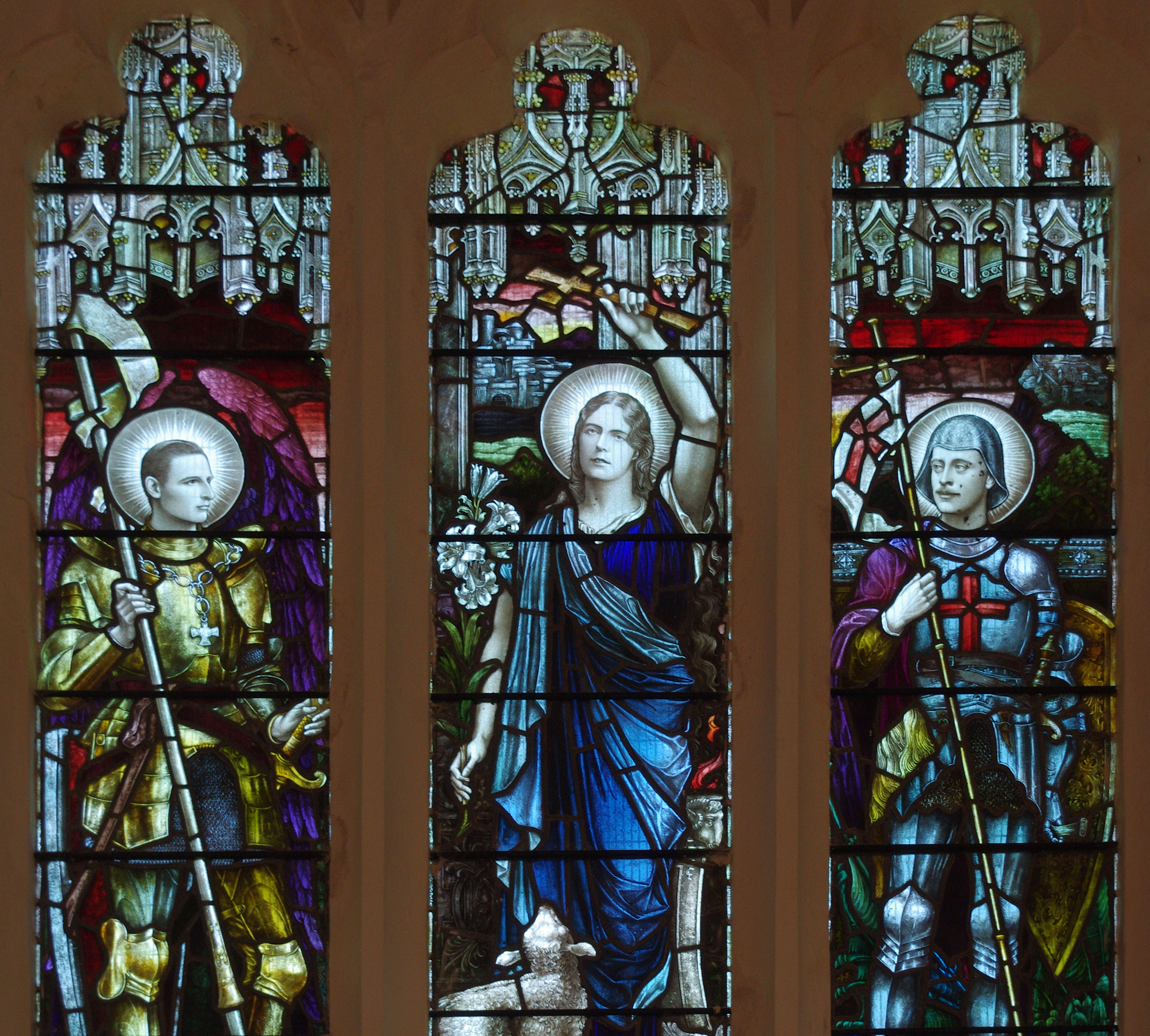
Agar-Robartes (right) memorialised in stained glass at Selsey Abbey

== Public life ==
He was elected a Member of Parliament for Bodmin in the 1906 general election, but lost his seat in June 1906 following a controversial election petition by the defeated candidate alleging illegal payments to potential voters. He was elected to the St Austell Division of Cornwall in a by-election in 1908 and held the seat until his death.

== Military career ==
He was commissioned a second lieutenant in the Royal 1st Devon Imperial Yeomanry on 13 May 1902. At the outbreak of World War I he joined the Royal Bucks Hussars as an officer. Tommy then joined the Coldstream Guards and was subsequently posted to France & Flanders. Captain The Honourable Thomas Charles Reginald Agar-Robartes, in command of No. 2 Coy, 1st Bn, the Coldstream Guards, was wounded in the Battle of Loos on 28 September and killed by a sniper on 30 September 1915 after rescuing a wounded comrade under heavy fire for which he was recommended for the Victoria Cross.

== Memorials ==
Agar-Robartes is buried in Lapugnoy Military Cemetery, near Béthune. He is commemorated by a memorial in Truro Cathedral and in stained glass at Selsey Abbey, Wimpole and Church Norton.

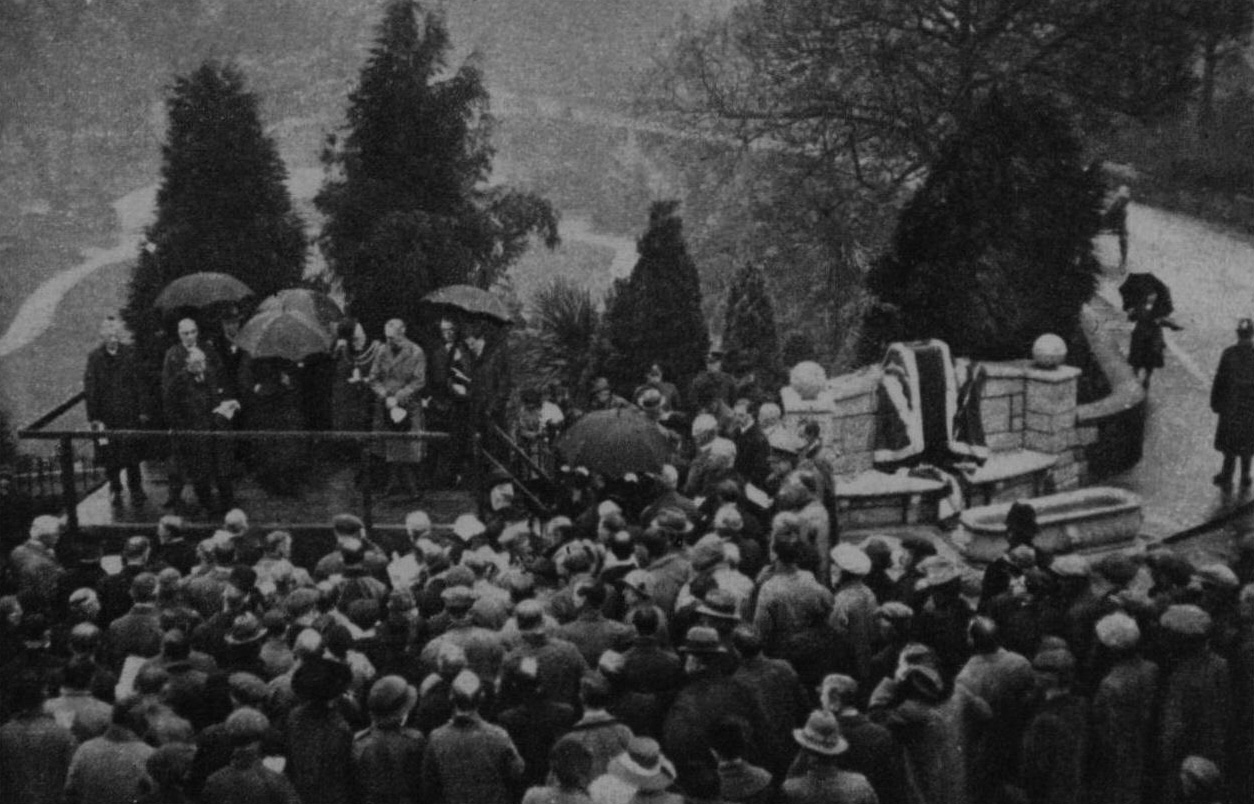
Unveiling in November 1922 of a memorial seat at St Austell, Cornwall, commemorating Agar-Robartes. This photograph shows Sir Clifford Cory MP speaking before the unveiling

Agar-Robartes is commemorated on Panel 8 of the Parliamentary War Memorial in Westminster Hall, one of 22 MPs who died during World War I to be named on that memorial. Agar-Robartes is one of 19 MPs who fell in the war who are commemorated by heraldic shields in the Commons Chamber. A further act of commemoration came with the unveiling in 1932 of a manuscript-style illuminated book of remembrance for the House of Commons, which included a short biographical account of the life and death of Agar-Robartes. As Agar-Robartes never married and had no children, his younger brother Francis later succeeded their father in the viscountcy.

== List of memorials ==
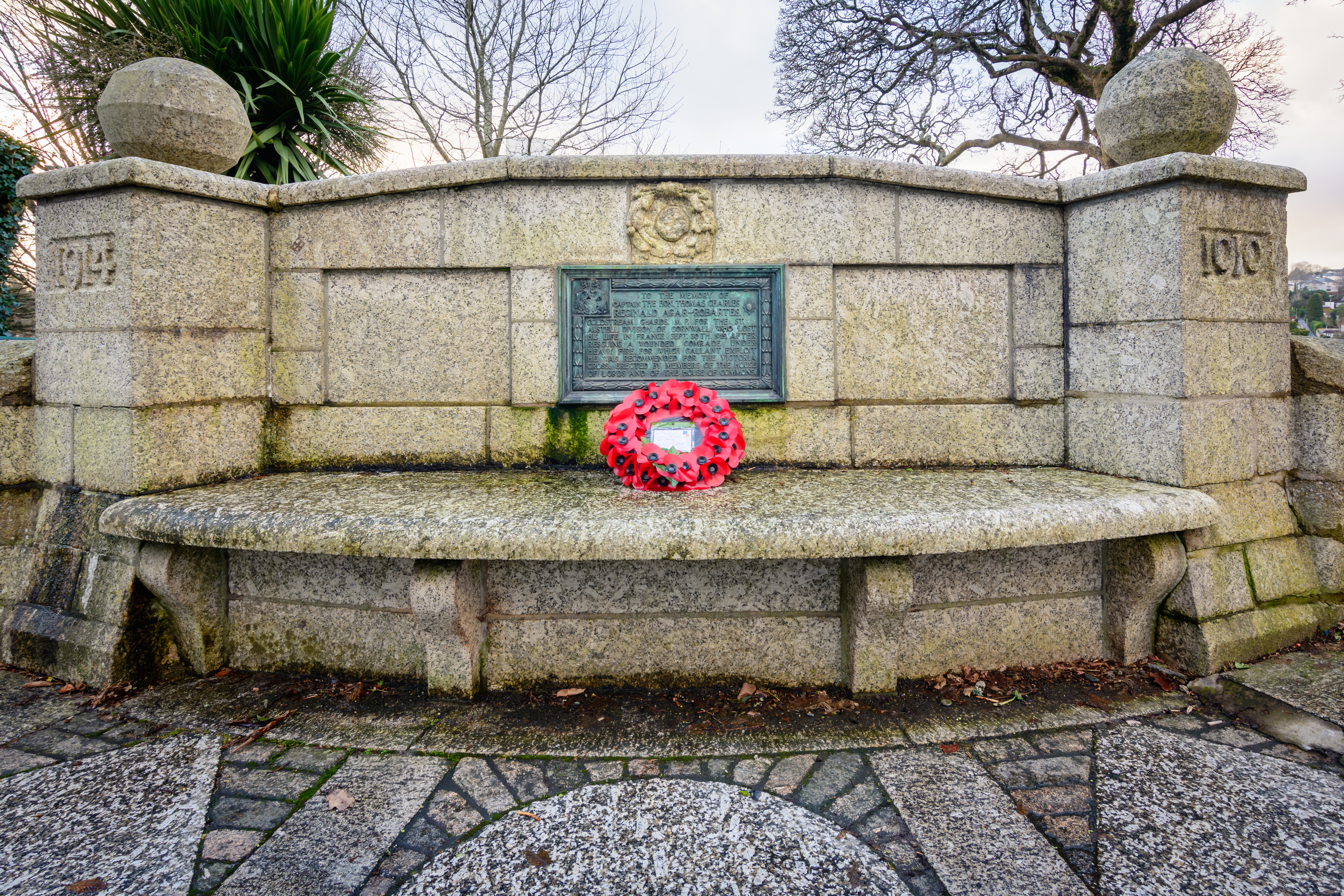
Granite memorial seat at Truro Road, St Austell

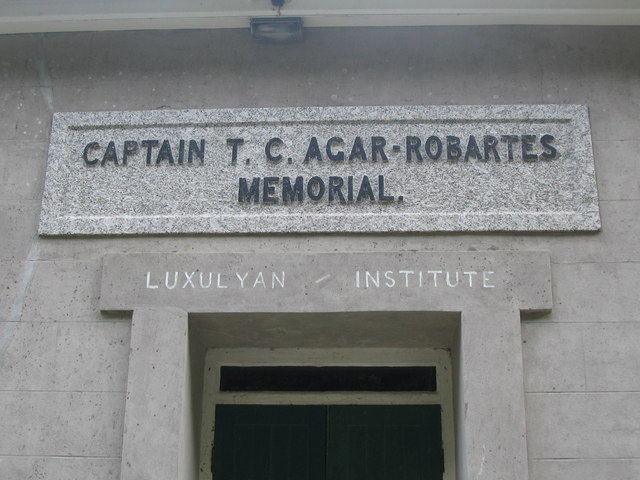
A memorial plaque at the Luxulyan Institute

- Headstone at Lapugnoy Military Cemetery, near Béthune
- Wooden battlefield marker St Hydroc's Church, Lanhydrock, Cornwall
- Granite memorial seat at Truro Road, St Austell, Cornwall
- Stained glass window at St Hydroc Church, Lanhydrock, Cornwall
- Stained glass window at Selsey Abbey, Sussex
- Stained glass window at St Andrew's Church, Wimpole, Cambridgeshire
- Stained glass window at St Wilfrid's Chapel, Church Norton, West Sussex
- Marble bust at Truro Cathedral
- Wooden armorial shield at the House of Commons
- Brass plaque in Holy Trinity Church, St Austell

== Notes ==
Parliament of the United Kingdom
Preceded by Sir Lewis Molesworth	Member of Parliament for Bodmin; 1906–1906	Succeeded by Freeman Freeman-Thomas
Preceded by William Alexander McArthur	Member of Parliament for St Austell; 1908–1915	Succeeded by Sir Francis Layland-Barratt
