= East Cornwall (constituency) =

Former parliamentary constituency in the United Kingdom

- Former county constituency for the House of Commons
- Context of 1832-1868. Extract from 1837 result: the middle, striped area.
- County: Cornwall

1832–1885
- Seats: Two
- Created from: Cornwall, Bossiney, Callington, Camelford, East Looe, Lostwithiel, St Germans, Saltash and West Looe
- Replaced by: Bodmin, Launceston and St Austell

East Cornwall was a county constituency in the House of Commons of the Parliament of the United Kingdom. It elected two Members of Parliament (MPs) by the bloc vote system of election.

== Boundaries ==
In 1832 the county of Cornwall, in south west England, was split for parliamentary purposes into two county divisions. These were the East division (with a place of election at Bodmin) and West Cornwall (where voting took place at Truro). Each division returned two members to Parliament.

The parliamentary boroughs included in the East division, from 1832 to 1885 (whose non-resident 40 shilling freeholders voted in the county constituency), were Bodmin, Launceston and Liskeard.

1832–1885: The Hundreds of East, West, Lesnewth, Stratton, and Trigg, and in the hundred of Powder, the eastern division, i.e. the parishes of St Austell, St Blazey, St Dennis, St Ewe, Fowey, Gorran, Ladock, Lanlivery, Lostwithiel, Luxulyan, Mevagissey, St Mewan, St Michael Caerhays, Roche, St Sampson's, St Stephen-in-Brannel, and Tywardreath, and in the hundred of Pydar, the parishes of St Breock, Colan, St Columb Minor and St Columb Major, St Ervan, St Eval, St Issey, Lanhydrock, Lanivet, Mawgan, St Merryn, Padstow, Little Petherick, St Wenn, and Withiel.

== History ==
In 1885 this division was abolished, when the East and West Cornwall county divisions were replaced by six new single-member county constituencies. These were Bodmin (the South-Eastern division), Camborne (North-Western division), Launceston (North-Eastern division), St Austell (Mid division), St Ives (the Western division) and Truro. In addition the last remaining Cornish borough constituency was Penryn and Falmouth.

== Members of Parliament ==
Election	First member	First party	Second member	Second party
1832	Sir William Molesworth, Bt	Radical	Sir William Salusbury-Trelawny, Bt	Whig
1837	Lord Eliot	Conservative	Sir Hussey Vivian, Bt	Whig
1841	Lord Eliot	Conservative	William Rashleigh	Conservative
1845 by-election	William Pole-Carew	Conservative	William Rashleigh	Conservative
1847	William Pole-Carew	Conservative	Thomas Agar-Robartes	Whig
1852	Nicholas Kendall	Conservative	Thomas Agar-Robartes	Whig
1859	Nicholas Kendall	Conservative	Thomas Agar-Robartes	Liberal
1868	Sir John Salusbury-Trelawney, Bt	Liberal	Edward Brydges Willyams	Liberal
1874	Sir Colman Rashleigh, Bt	Liberal	John Tremayne	Conservative
1880	Hon. Thomas Agar-Robartes	Liberal	William Copeland Borlase	Liberal
1882 by-election	Thomas Dyke Acland	Liberal	William Copeland Borlase	Liberal
1885	Constituency abolished			

== Election results ==
=== Elections in the 1830s ===
General election 1832: East Cornwall (2 seats)
Party	Candidate	Votes	%
Radical	William Molesworth	Unopposed	
Whig	William Salusbury-Trelawny	Unopposed	
Registered electors		4,462	
Radical win (new seat)			
Whig win (new seat)			

General election 1835: East Cornwall (2 seats)
Party	Candidate	Votes	%
Radical	William Molesworth	Unopposed	
Whig	William Salusbury-Trelawny	Unopposed	
Registered electors		4,392	
Radical hold			
Whig hold			

General election 1837: East Cornwall (2 seats)
Party	Candidate	Votes	%
Conservative	Edward Eliot	2,430	34.8
Whig	Hussey Vivian	2,294	32.9
Whig	William Salusbury-Trelawny	2,250	32.3
Turnout		4,648	85.0
Registered electors		5,469	
Majority		136	1.9
Conservative gain from Radical			
Majority		44	0.6
Whig hold			

=== Elections in the 1840s ===
General election 1841: East Cornwall (2 seats)
Party	Candidate	Votes	%	±%
Conservative	Edward Eliot	3,006	40.3	+22.9
Conservative	William Rashleigh	2,807	37.6	+20.2
Radical	John Trelawny	1,647	22.1	N/A
Majority		1,160	15.5	+13.6
Turnout		4,549	74.9	−10.1
Registered electors		6,076		
Conservative hold		Swing	+22.9	
Conservative gain from Whig		Swing	+20.2	

Eliot was appointed Chief Secretary to the Lord Lieutenant of Ireland, requiring a by-election.

By-election, 22 September 1841: East Cornwall
Party	Candidate	Votes	%	±%
Conservative	Edward Eliot	Unopposed		
Conservative hold				

Eliot was elevated to the peerage, becoming 3rd Earl of St Germans and causing a by-election.

By-election, 20 February 1845: East Cornwall
Party	Candidate	Votes	%	±%
Conservative	William Pole-Carew	Unopposed		
Conservative hold				

General election 1847: East Cornwall (2 seats)
Party	Candidate	Votes	%	±%
Conservative	William Pole-Carew	Unopposed		
Whig	Thomas Agar-Robartes	Unopposed		
Registered electors		6,270		
Conservative hold				
Whig gain from Conservative				

=== Elections in the 1850s ===
General election 1852: East Cornwall (2 seats)
Party	Candidate	Votes	%	±%
Whig	Thomas Agar-Robartes	2,609	39.6	N/A
Conservative	Nicholas Kendall	1,996	30.3	N/A
Conservative	William Pole-Carew	1,979	30.1	N/A
Majority		613	9.3	N/A
Turnout		4,597 (est)	80.7 (est)	N/A
Registered electors		5,694		
Whig hold		Swing	N/A	
Conservative hold		Swing	N/A	

General election 1857: East Cornwall (2 seats)
Party	Candidate	Votes	%	±%
Whig	Thomas Agar-Robartes	Unopposed		
Conservative	Nicholas Kendall	Unopposed		
Registered electors		6,261		
Whig hold				
Conservative hold				

General election 1859: East Cornwall (2 seats)
Party	Candidate	Votes	%	±%
Liberal	Thomas Agar-Robartes	Unopposed		
Conservative	Nicholas Kendall	Unopposed		
Registered electors		6,240		
Liberal gain from Whig				
Conservative hold				

=== Elections in the 1860s ===
General election 1865: East Cornwall (2 seats)
Party	Candidate	Votes	%	±%
Conservative	Nicholas Kendall	Unopposed		
Liberal	Thomas Agar-Robartes	Unopposed		
Registered electors		5,781		
Conservative hold				
Liberal hold				

General election 1868: East Cornwall (2 seats)
Party	Candidate	Votes	%	±%
Liberal	John Salusbury-Trelawny	Unopposed		
Liberal	Edward Brydges Willyams	Unopposed		
Registered electors		8,701		
Liberal hold				
Liberal gain from Conservative				

=== Elections in the 1870s ===
General election 1874: East Cornwall (2 seats)
Party	Candidate	Votes	%	±%
Liberal	Colman Rashleigh	3,395	26.6	N/A
Conservative	John Tremayne	3,276	25.7	New
Conservative	William Pole-Carew	3,099	24.3	New
Liberal	Reginald Kelly	2,978	23.4	N/A
Turnout		6,374 (est)	71.0 (est)	N/A
Registered electors		8,982		
Majority		296	2.3	N/A
Liberal hold		Swing	N/A	
Majority		298	2.3	N/A
Conservative gain from Liberal		Swing	N/A	

=== Elections in the 1880s ===
General election 1880: East Cornwall (2 seats)
Party	Candidate	Votes	%	±%
Liberal	Thomas Agar-Robartes	4,018	30.1	+3.5
Liberal	William Copeland Borlase	3,883	29.1	+5.7
Conservative	John Tremayne	3,033	22.7	−3.0
Conservative	Digby Collins	2,403	18.0	−6.3
Majority		850	6.4	N/A
Turnout		6,669 (est)	72.9 (est)	+1.9
Registered electors		9,150		
Liberal hold		Swing		
Liberal gain from Conservative		Swing		

Robartes was elevated to the peerage, becoming Lord Robartes.

By-election, 3 Apr 1882: East Cornwall (1 seat)
Party	Candidate	Votes	%	±%
Liberal	Thomas Dyke Acland	3,720	51.4	−7.8
Conservative	John Tremayne	3,520	48.6	+7.9
Majority		200	2.8	−3.6
Turnout		7,240	76.3	+3.4 (est)
Registered electors		9,484		
Liberal hold		Swing	−7.9	

There were 86 spoiled papers, which was considered an unusually high number.

== See also ==
- List of former United Kingdom Parliament constituencies
