= William Rashleigh (1817–1871) =

William Rashleigh (16 April 1817 – 31 October 1871) was an English Conservative Party politician.

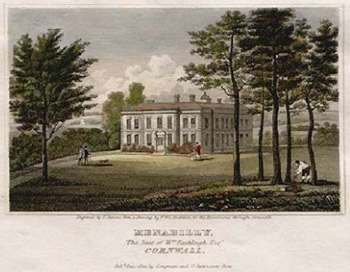
Antique print of Menabilly

He was the eldest son of William Rashleigh I and his second wife Caroline Hinxman, daughter of Henry Hinxman of Ivychurch, Wiltshire.

He was a Member of Parliament (MP) for East Cornwall from 1841 to 1847. In 1855 he succeeded on the death of his father to the Menabilly estate near Fowey on the south coast of Cornwall.

He died in 1871. In 1843 he had married Hon. Catherine Stuart (died 1872), eldest daughter of the Scottish peer Robert Walter Stuart, 11th Lord Blantyre (1777–1830). He left no male progeny and was succeeded by his brother Jonathan Rashleigh (1820–1905).

== Bibliography ==
- Pirie-Gordon, H., ed. (1937). "Rashleigh of Menabilly". Burke's genealogical and heraldic history of the landed gentry (15th (centenary) ed.). London: Shaw Publishing.

Parliament of the United Kingdom
Preceded by Lord Eliot; Sir Hussey Vivian, Bt	Member of Parliament for East Cornwall; 1841 – 1847; With: Lord Eliot to 1845; William Pole-Carew from 1845	Succeeded by William Pole-Carew; Thomas Agar-Robartes
