= 1845 East Cornwall by-election =

UK parliamentary by-election

The 1845 East Cornwall by-election was an uncontested election held on 20 February 1845. The by-election was brought about due to the vacation from the seat of the incumbent Conservative MP, Edward Eliot, who succeeded to the peerage as the Earl of St Germans. It was won by the Conservative candidate William Pole-Carew, who was the only declared candidate.
