= John Salusbury-Trelawny =

British politician

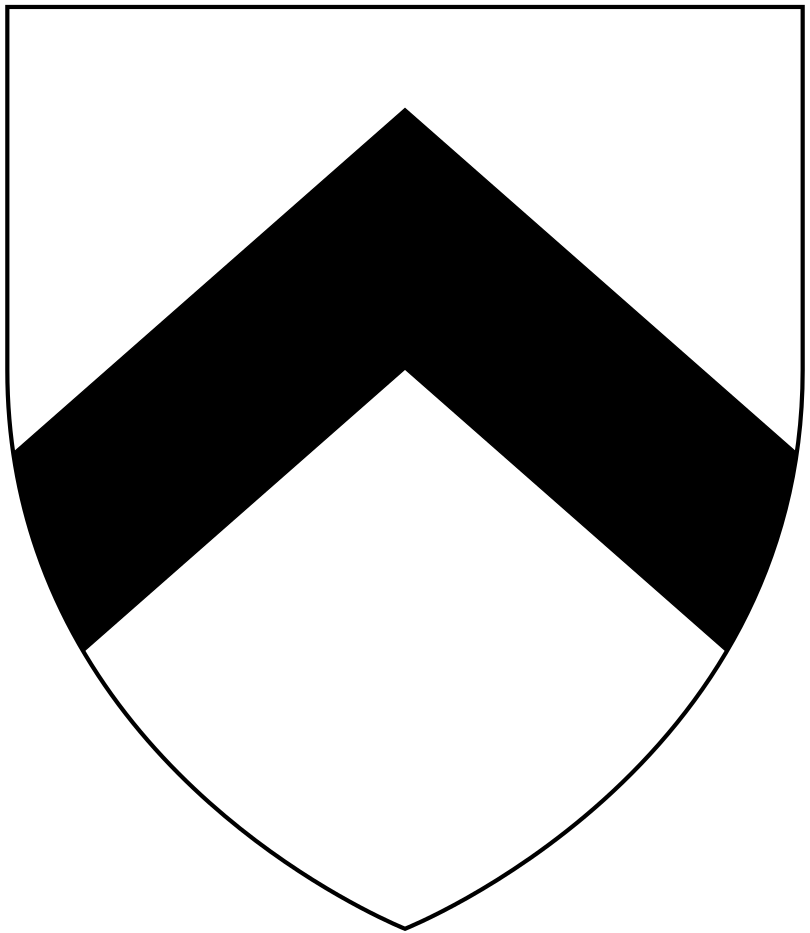
Arms of Trelawny: Argent, a chevron sable

Sir John Salusbury Salusbury-Trelawny, 9th Baronet (2 June 1816 – 4 August 1885), was a British Liberal politician.

== Life ==
Born at Harewood on 2 June 1816 to Patience Christian Carpenter and Sir William Salusbury-Trelawny, the 8th Baronet of Trelawny. He was educated at Westminster School and Trinity College, Cambridge.

In 1840, Trelawny was appointed Deputy-lieutenant of Cornwall and captain of the Cornwall Rangers; subsequently commanding the 2nd Cornwall Rifles Militia. In 1841 he was called to the bar, but never practiced and, in the same year, unsuccessfully contested Cornwall East Parliament Constituency as a Liberal. Salusbury-Trelawny sat as Member of Parliament for Tavistock between 1843 and 1852 and 1857 and 1865 and for Cornwall East between 1868 and 1874. He succeeded his father to the baronetcy in 1856 and retired from parliament in 1874 owing to "increasing infirmities".

== Family ==
Trelawny was twice married:

1. Firstly, in 1842, to Harriet Jane Tremayne, author and daughter of John Hearle Tremayne.
2. Secondly, in 1881, to Harriet Jacqueline Keppel, widow of Edward George Walpole Keppel of Lexham Hall, daughter of Sir Anthony Buller.

He had issue from his first marriage.

Parliament of the United Kingdom
Preceded by John Rundle; Lord Edward Russell	Member of Parliament for Tavistock; 1843 – 1852; With: Lord Edward Russell 1843–47; Edward Russell 1847–52	Succeeded by Edward Russell; Samuel Carter
Preceded by Viscount Enfield; Robert Phillimore	Member of Parliament for Tavistock; 1857 – 1865; With: Viscount Enfield 1857; Lord Arthur Russell 1857–65	Succeeded by Lord Arthur Russell; Joseph d'Aguilar Samuda
Preceded by Thomas Agar-Robartes; Nicholas Kendall	Member of Parliament for Cornwall East; 1868 – 1874; With: Edward Brydges Willyams	Succeeded by Sir Colman Rashleigh; John Tremayne
Baronetage of England
Preceded by William Lewis Salusbury-Trelawny	Baronet (of Trelawny); 1856–1885	Succeeded by William Lewis Salusbury-Trelawny, 10th Baronet
