= Charles Adeane =

British army officer (1863–1943)

- Born: 2 November 1863
- Died: 11 February 1943 (aged 79)
- Relatives: Humphrey Lyttelton (grandson)
- Military career
- Allegiance: United Kingdom
- Branch: British Army
- Rank: Honorary Colonel
- Units: 4th Battalion, Suffolk Regiment; Cambridgeshire Volunteer Regiment
- Awards: Companion of the Order of the Bath; Order of St Sava of Serbia; Officer of the Belgian Order of the Crown
- Other work: Justice of the peace Lord Lieutenant of Cambridgeshire; President of the Royal Agricultural Society

Charles Robert Whorwood Adeane CB JP (2 November 1863 – 11 February 1943) was a British army officer.

== Background ==
Adeane was the only son of the politician Henry John Adeane and his wife Lady Elizabeth Philippa Yorke, eldest daughter of Charles Yorke, 4th Earl of Hardwicke. Adeane was educated at Eton College and at Christ Church, Oxford. He received an Honorary Doctorate of Laws by the University of Cambridge.

== Career ==
He served in the British Army and was lieutenant of the 4th Battalion, Suffolk Regiment. During this time Adeane was decorated with the Order of St Sava of Serbia. After his retirement he became Honorary Colonel of the Cambridgeshire Volunteer Regiment. Adeane was justice of the peace and Lord Lieutenant of Cambridgeshire from 1915 until his death in 1943. In 1917, he was appointed President of the Royal Agricultural Society. In the latter year, Adeane was awarded a Companion of the Order of the Bath and in 1920, he was invested as an Officer of the Belgian Order of the Crown.

General Election 1900: Huntingdon
Party	Candidate	Votes	%	±%
Conservative	George Montagu	2,118	53.5	−0.4
Liberal	Charles Adeane	1,838	46.5	+0.4
Majority		280	7.0	−0.8
Turnout		3,956	75.8	−6.8
Registered electors		5,222		
Conservative hold		Swing	−0.4	

== Family ==
The Wyndham Sisters: Lady Elcho, Mrs. Adeane, and Mrs. Tennant, by John Singer Sargent, 1899 (Metropolitan Museum)

On 23 July 1888, he married Madeline Pamela Constance Blanche Wyndham, daughter of Hon. Percy Scawen Wyndham, a son of George Wyndham, 1st Baron Leconfield. They had seven children, two sons and five daughters. His daughter Helena Olivia Adeane (1902–1985) was the first wife of William Pleydell-Bouverie, 7th Earl of Radnor and mother of the 8th Earl of Radnor.

His grandson, through his eldest daughter, Pamela, was the jazz musician and broadcaster Humphrey Lyttelton.

His grandson, through his fourth daughter, Lettice, was Sir Timothy Colman KG of the Colman's mustard family.

Honorary titles
Preceded by The Viscount Clifden	Lord Lieutenant of Cambridgeshire; 1915 – 1943	Succeeded by Richard George Briscoe
