= William Copeland Borlase =

British antiquarian and liberal politician

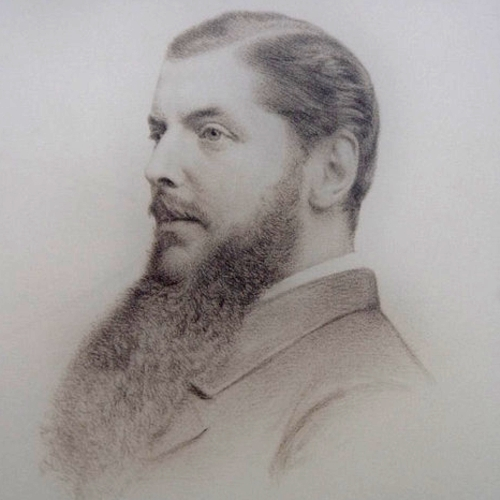
- Photograph of Borlase, c. 1880

Member of Parliament for St Austell
- In office 1885–1887
- Preceded by: New constituency
- Succeeded by: William Alexander McArthur

Member of Parliament for East Cornwall
- In office 1880–1885
- Preceded by: Sir Colman Rashleigh; John Tremayne
- Succeeded by: Constituency abolished

Personal details
- Born: 5 April 1848 Castle Horneck, Penzance, Cornwall
- Died: 31 March 1899 (aged 50) Bloomsbury, London
- Resting place: Highgate Cemetery (east)
- Spouse: Alice Lucy Kent
- Parent(s): Samuel Borlase; Mary Anne Copeland Borlase
- Relatives: William Borlase
- Education: Winchester College; Trinity College, Oxford
- Occupation: Antiquarian and politician

William Copeland Borlase FSA (5 April 1848 – 31 March 1899) was a British antiquarian and Liberal politician who sat in the House of Commons from 1880 until 1887 when he was ruined by bankruptcy and scandal. He was a member of the Borlase family.

== Early life ==
Borlase was born at Castle Horneck, near Penzance in Cornwall, England, the only son of Samuel Borlase and his wife Mary Anne (née Copeland) Borlase (d. 1882), daughter of William Copeland of Chigwell, Essex.

A member of a wealthy Cornish family, Borlase's early life was much influenced by the archaeological work of his great-great-grandfather, Dr. William Borlase the Cornish historian. Young Borlase visited many of the ancient sites in Cornwall and in 1863 and supervised the excavations of the re-discovered prehistoric settlement and fogou at Carn Euny. Although Borlase produced many sketches he commissioned fellow Cornish antiquarian John Thomas Blight to do the engravings for the report.

Borlase was educated at Winchester College and Trinity College, Oxford.

== Career ==
He was called to the bar at Inner Temple in 1882 and was JP for Cornwall and a Deputy Warden of the Stannaries of Cornwall and Devon.

In the 1880 general election, Borlase was elected Liberal Member of Parliament for East Cornwall, until the seat was divided in the Redistribution of Seats Act 1885. In the 1885 general election, he was elected MP for St Austell. In 1886, he was made Parliamentary Secretary to the Local Government Board. However he took to fine living. His Portuguese mistress exposed his debts and the scandal brought him ruin and bankruptcy.

He resigned his seat in the House of Commons on 29 April 1887 and his house at Laregan was put up for auction on 17 May 1887. He left England to work in Ireland as a remittance man and also went on to manage tin mines in Spain and Portugal. The rest of the family disowned him and he died aged 50. His address when he died was 34, Bedford Court Mansions, Bloomsbury, in London.

== Works ==
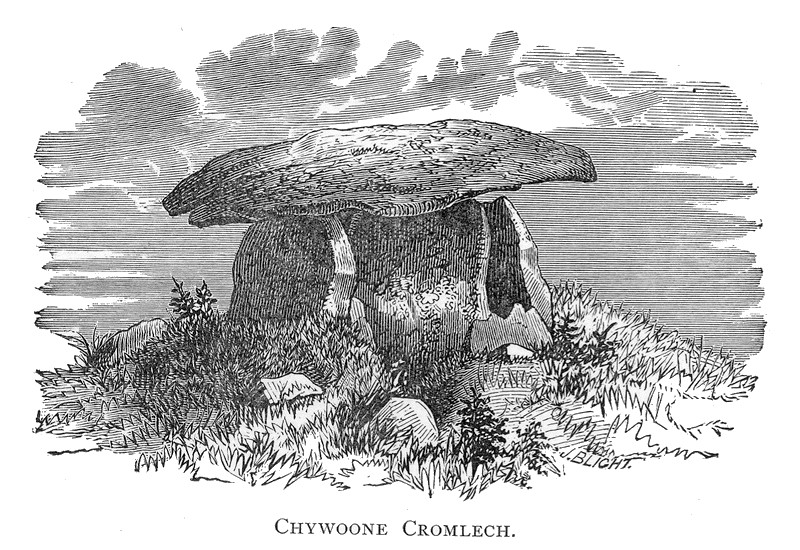
Chun Quoit, Morvah (drawing from Naenia Cornubiae, 1872)

- An Account of Excavations at Carn Euny, 1862–1864
- Ancient Cornwall, 1871, 2 vols.
- Nænia Cornubiae, a descriptive essay, illustrative of the sepulchres and funereal customs of the early inhabitants of the county of Cornwall, Longmans, Green : London; J.R. Netherton : Truro, 1872, (Reissued: ISBN 978-1-897853-36-8) (Note: It has been estimated that Borlase excavated about 200 barrows in Cornwall but he has been criticised for poor archaeological practice, particularly in only writing accounts of a tenth of the barrows.)
- Historical sketch of the tin trade in Cornwall, from the earliest period to the present day : a lecture delivered at the Institute, St. Just-in-Penwith, March 9th, 1874 : with additional matter and notes, W. Brendon : Plymouth, 1874
- Niphon and its antiquities: an essay on the ethnology, mythology and religions of the Japanese, W. Brendon and Son : Plymouth, 1876
- Sunways : A Record of Rambles in Many Lands, W. Brendon and Son : Plymouth, 1878
- Prehistoric Stone Monuments of the British Isles: Cornwall With 40 tinted litho plates, accurately drawn to scale by W. C. Lukis and W. C. Borlase, Society of Antiquaries., 1885
- The Age of the Saints: a monograph of early Christianity in Cornwall with the legends of the Cornish saints and an introduction illustrative of the ethnology of the district, Joseph Pollard : Truro, 1895 (Reissued: ISBN 978-1-897853-86-3)
- Tin-Mining in Spain Past and Present, Effingham Wilson : London, 1897
- The Dolmens of Ireland, their Distribution, Structural Characteristics, and Affinities in Other Countries; together with the folk-lore attaching to them and traditions of the Irish people, Chapman & Hall : London, 1897, 3 vols., (Reissued: ISBN 978-0-543-78444-5)
  - Pages 1-312, vol. 1, 1897
  - Pages 313-712, vol. 2, 1897
  - Pages 713-1234, vol. 3, 1897

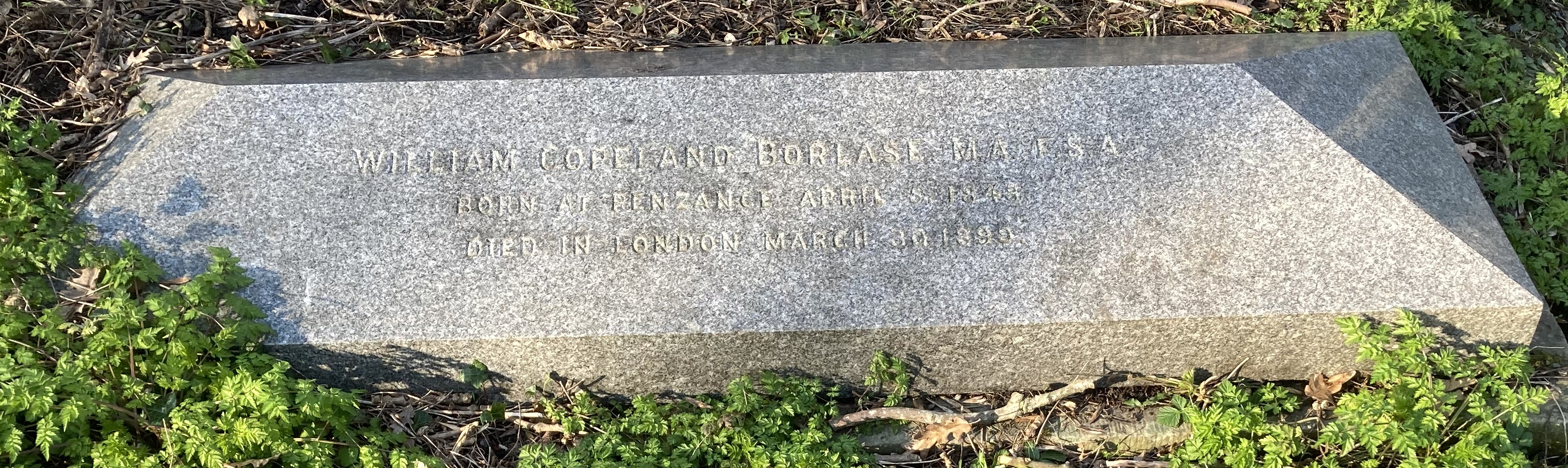
Grave of William Copeland Borlase in Highgate Cemetery (east)

== Death ==
Borlase died on 31 March 1899 and was buried in the east side of Highgate Cemetery.

== Notes ==
Parliament of the United Kingdom
Preceded by Sir Colman Rashleigh and John Tremayne	Member of Parliament for East Cornwall; 1880 – 1885; With: Thomas Agar-Robartes 1880–1882; Charles Thomas Dyke Acland 1882–1885	Constituency abolished
New constituency	Member of Parliament for St Austell; 1885 – 1887	Succeeded by William Alexander McArthur
