= John Tremayne (1825–1901) =

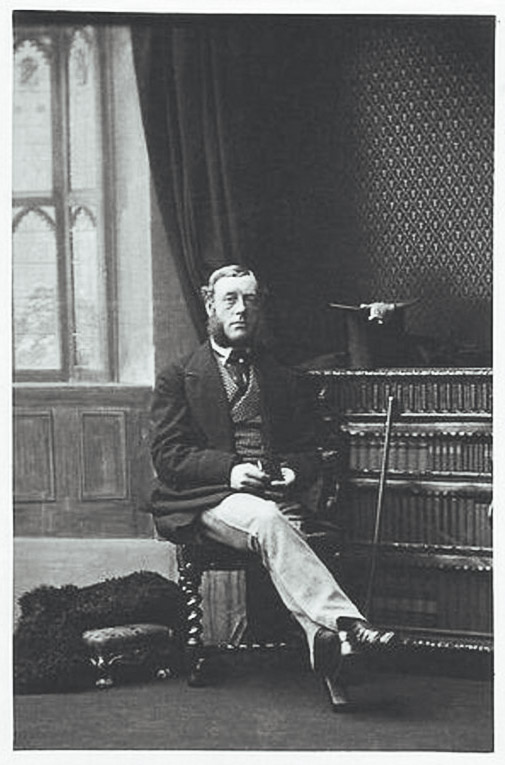
John Tremayne 1860

John Tremayne (1825–1901) was a member of a landed family in the English county of Cornwall, and owner of the Heligan estate near Mevagissey. At various times, he was a member of the UK Parliament for the constituencies of East Cornwall and South Devon, and High Sheriff of Cornwall. He was also the third of four successive members of the Tremayne family who are credited with the creation of the gardens around Heligan House that are now well known as the Lost Gardens of Heligan.

== Birth and early life ==
John Tremayne was born 15 April 1825, the son of Caroline and John Hearle Tremayne. His mother's brother was Sir Charles Lemon, who left his estate at Carclew to John Tremayne's brother, Arthur. His other siblings, Henry, Mary, and Harriet married into other gentry or noble families.

In his teens, John Tremayne contracted a crippling bone disease that left him reliant on crutches for the rest of his life. As convalescence, he was consigned to the care of a Charlestown mariner, with instructions to take him to sea every day, irrespective of the weather. He was educated at a private school at Exmouth, Eton School, and Christ Church College at the University of Oxford.

== Heligan ==
John Tremayne inherited the Heligan estate from his father in 1851. Like his father, John was a keen gardener. He was particularly fond of hybridizing rhododendrons, and is credited with much of the planting around Flora's Green in the north of what is now the Lost Gardens of Heligan.

John Tremayne also inherited an estate at Sydenham in Devonshire.

== Politics and other offices ==
John Tremayne was elected Member of Parliament (MP) for the East Cornwall parliamentary constituency in 1874 and represented that constituency until he was defeated in 1880. He then sat for the South Devon parliamentary constituency from 1884 to 1885. In both cases, he sat on the Conservative Party benches.

In addition to his parliamentary service, John Tremayne was a justice of the peace and, in 1859, High Sheriff of Cornwall. He served as chairman of the North Cornwall Railway Company.

== Marriage and children ==
In 1860, John Tremayne married the Hon. Mary Charlotte Vivian, daughter of Lord Vivian of Glynn. They had two sons, Perys Edmund, born 1866, died 1867, and John Claude Lewis, born 1869 and better known as "Jack", and three daughters.

- John Claude married Eleanor, the daughter of Jonathan Rashleigh of Menabilly. They later divorced; no children resulted from this marriage.
- Onera Mary (died 10 October 1936)
- Harriet Maud
- Grace Damaris Matilda, married 1889, Charles Babington, Esq.

== Death ==
John Tremayne died in the spring of 1901 at Biarritz in France.

Parliament of the United Kingdom
Preceded by Sir John Salusbury-Trelawny; Edward Brydges Willyams	Member of Parliament for East Cornwall; 1874 – 1880; With: Sir Colman Rashleigh	Succeeded by William Copeland Borlase; Thomas Agar-Robartes
Preceded by John Carpenter Garnier; Sir Massey Lopes, Bt.	Member of Parliament for South Devon; 1884 – 1885; With: Sir Massey Lopes, Bt.	Constituency abolished
