= William Pole-Carew =

Cornish politician (1811–1888)

William Henry Pole-Carew (30 July 1811 – 20 January 1888) was a Cornish politician.

== Biography ==
Pole-Carew was born in Eaton Place, Marylebone, in 1811, the son of Reginald Pole-Carew and Hon. Caroline Anne Lyttelton, daughter of William Lyttelton, 1st Baron Lyttelton. His father was a paternal descendant of the Pole baronets of Shute House. He was educated at Charterhouse School from 1824 to 1828, and then at Oriel College, Oxford, gaining a BA in 1833 and an MA in 1864.

He served as Conservative Member of Parliament for East Cornwall from 1845 until 1852, and unsuccessfully contested Liskeard in 1859. He served as High Sheriff of Cornwall in 1854–1855, and as Recorder of East Looe from 1857 to 1886.

Pole-Carew joined the Canterbury Association on 3 June 1848. He was friends with John Robert Godley, and the Godley family stayed with him at Antony House while awaiting departure of the Lady Nugent for Lyttelton. The Return of Owners of Land, 1873 Survey recorded that Carew-Pole's Estates near Torpoint in Cornwall comprised 3,698 acres of land yielding an estimated £6,401.

He died on 20 January 1888 at the Villa Poralto, Cannes, and is buried in the parish church at Antony, Cornwall.

== Family ==
Pole-Carew was married on 28 August 1838 to Frances Anne Buller, daughter of John Buller. She died at Antony House on 10 October 1902. They had issue of three daughters and four sons, the eldest son being Lieutenant-General Sir Reginald Pole-Carew. His grandson succeeded a distant relative as baronet, of Shute House.

Parliament of the United Kingdom
Preceded by Lord Eliot; William Rashleigh	Member of Parliament for East Cornwall; 1845–1852; With: William Rashleigh 1845–1847; Thomas Agar-Robartes 1847–1852	Succeeded by Thomas Agar-Robartes; Nicholas Kendall
Honorary titles
Preceded by Francis Howell	High Sheriff of Cornwall; 1855	Succeeded by Sir William Berkeley Call, Bt
