= Francis Layland-Barratt =

British politician

Francis Layland-Barratt

Sir Francis Layland-Barratt, 1st Baronet (1860 – 12 September 1933) was a British Liberal Party politician.

== Background ==
He was born in 1860, the first son of Francis Barratt of St Austell, Cornwall and educated at Trinity Hall, Cambridge (MA, LLB). He married in 1884, Frances Layland (Lady of Grace of the Order of St John of Jerusalem, CBE 1920) of Stonehouse, Wallasey. They had one son and three daughters. He assumed the additional surname of Layland by Royal Licence in 1895.

== Career ==
He contested the Torquay Division of Devon at the General Election of 1895, for the Liberal Party, but was unable to take the seat from the Conservative. He served as High Sheriff of Cornwall from 1897 to 1898. He contested Torquay for the Liberals again at the 1900 General Election and this time was successful, gaining the seat from the Conservative. He served as Liberal MP for Torquay from 1900 to 1910. He served as a justice of the peace in Devon and Cornwall. He was appointed deputy lieutenant for Cornwall. He was re-elected at the 1906 General Election. On 23 July 1908 he was created a Baronet. He was re-elected at the General Election of January 1910 with a majority of just 11 votes. He lost his seat at the General Election of December 1910 to a Liberal Unionist. In 1915, the Liberal MP for St Austell Division of Cornwall was killed in action. Barrett was chosen as Liberal candidate to replace him and due to the wartime electoral truce, did not face a Unionist opponent and was elected. He served as Liberal MP for St Austell from 1915 to 1918. He retired from parliament in 1918 when his constituency was abolished and did not contest any further General Elections. He continued to support the Liberal Party, at a local level in Torquay, he was the party's main patron. He served as Treasurer for the National Liberal Federation from 1927 until his death. He died on 12 September 1933 at the age of 73. His baronetcy then passed to his son Francis Henry Godolphin Layland-Barratt. His grave can be found in the churchyard of St Mewan Church a mile outside St Austell.

== Sources ==
- Who Was Who
- British parliamentary election results 1885–1918, Craig, F. W. S.

Parliament of the United Kingdom
Preceded by Arthur Stephens Philpotts	Member of Parliament for Torquay; 1900 – December 1910	Succeeded by Charles Forbes-Leith
Preceded by Thomas Agar-Robartes	Member of Parliament for St Austell; 1915 – 1918	constituency abolished
Baronetage of the United Kingdom
New creation	Baronet (of the Manor House and of Trefgarne Lodge); 1908–1933	Succeeded by Francis Layland-Barratt
