= Walter Borlase =

- Born: 1694; Pendeen, Cornwall, UK
- Died: April 26, 1776 (aged 81)

Walter Borlase (November 1694 – 26 April 1776) was vicar of Madron, Kenwyn and Kea, prebendary of Exeter, vice-warden of the stannaries, and a magistrate.

== Early life ==
He was born at Pendeen in November 1694 and baptised on 5 November 1694. He was the third son of John Borlase and his wife, Lydia Harris, but his older brothers both died in infancy, leaving Walter as his father's heir. He had four brothers, including William Borlase, and four sisters.

== Education and career ==
He was educated in Penzance and then Westminster. In 1712, he matriculated at Exeter College, Oxford, which was his father's alma mater, and graduated in 1715, when he went to study law at the Middle Temple, but his father found it too expensive to support him there.

In 1717, he went to Ireland and worked under the Duke of Bolton, Lord Lieutenant of Ireland for two years, but then returned to Cornwall. Abandoning his plans for a legal career, he earned a degree from King's College, Cambridge, and was ordained.

On 27 September 1720, aged 25, he became vicar of Madron.

In 1727, he earned the degree of Doctor of Law at Cambridge.

In May 1729, he was paid £10 to procure a curate for St Mary's chapel.

In 8 September 1731, he became vicar of Kenwyn and Kea, as well as Madron. He remained in both roles until his death.

However, his prominence was due to his work as a judge and magistrate, rather than as a clergyman. In 1743, he was appointed a Justice of the Peace.

Between 1743 and 1747, he led the opposition to the Wesleyan Methodists in West Cornwall. As a magistrate, he sought out Papists, Jacobites and others disaffected with the Church and establishment, and he was hostile to the Wesleys, including issuing warrants under the vagrancy laws for the arrest of John Wesley and other Methodist preachers suspected of being Jacobites. He received a letter of thanks from the Duke of Newcastle, who was Secretary of State, thanking him for his work as a Justice during the Rebellion of 1745.

His methods as a magistrate included sometimes sending complaints of quarrels into the stable yard to be flogged by the coachman, which he claimed was a cheaper alternative than sending them to Bodmin and reduced the number of unjust accusations and family quarrels.

He was a Whig and a supporter of the House of Hanover. In 1752, he was elected to represent Penwith and Kerrier at the Stannary Parliament. In 1756, he was appointed Vice-Warden of the Stannaries.

In 1765, he succeeded his brother George as Mayor of Penzance. He ended his year of office by transferring the borough revenues to himself and others until the bonds used to fund a new quay were repaid, which left Walter and his co-trustees in control of the town revenues until his death.

== Personal life ==
In 1718, his father bought Castle Horneck in Penzance for him. He built the mansion at Castle Horneck, which was completed by 1740.

In 1720, he married his cousin, Margaret Pendarves, a vicar's daughter. Between 1721 and 1742, they had fifteen children. Margaret died in April 1743, aged 42.

He became frustrated with his father's longevity, describing him in 1743 as in "extraordinary florid health". These problems became greater with age, with Walter complaining in 1752 that "he is ruining me...running fast into debt" and, in 1753, about "the old gentleman's perverse and inflexible temper".

The hale state of his body is wonderful for such an age, but the reason of his mind is incredibly weak, or most singularly wrong and self-willed; suspicious to the last degree towards his own, but to strangers and servants so free and liberal...that he's abused by them, himself consenting. The consequences of all this must fall on my shoulders; this is the cross I must bear, if I survive him.

— Walter Borlase to his daughter Peggy Borlase, 23 November 1752

He had a poor relationship with his sons, due in part to his father's longevity. In 1752, he wrote, "I did not think...that my family would grow up while I remained but as a minor." He complained in 1753 that his sons "gape for money...that they may defile themselves...with the crudities of folly and vice". His eldest son died of smallpox at Christ Church, Oxford in 1754, and his fourth son died in Calcutta in 1757.

His father, John Borlase, died on 9 April 1755 aged 89, shortly after passing management of his estates to Walter. This led to a dispute between Walter and his brother William about the lease on William's house, which took well over a year to resolve, with William eventually giving up his claim to his house. The brothers were able to restore their previous harmony, with William stepping in to mediate disputes between Walter and his children, including in 1765, his daughter Harriet, who left Castle Horneck after an argument; in 1766, his now heir, Samuel Borlase, when Walter wouldn't relinquish a share of family affairs to him; and in 1768, his fifth son, William, who had displeased him in some way. He also clashed with John Wesley, who was on friendly terms with his brother William.

He was a Protestant and attended Madron Church on Sundays. In 1745, in response to the initial success of the Jacobite Rebellion, he took fencing lessons and resolved "to die in the defence of my country."

He was described as wearing "long and spacious coats, 'tights' and stockings, and buckles, powdered hair and broad hat."

Having outlived all his younger brothers, Walter Borlase died on 26 April 1776, aged 81.
