= William Alexander McArthur =

British politician (1857–1923)

William McArthur circa 1906

William McArthur circa 1895

William Alexander McArthur (1857 – 7 June 1923), was a British Liberal politician and businessman.

== Biography ==
McArthur was born in Sydney, Colony of New South Wales, the eldest son of Alexander McArthur and his wife Maria Bowden, the second daughter of the Rev. William B. Boyce. McArthur's father was a businessman and politician in Australia and England, becoming MP for Leicester. McArthur was educated privately.

On 12 August 1890 at the Trinity Wesleyan Church, Abingdon-on-Thames, Berkshire, he married Florence Creemer (died 24 October 1940), the third daughter of John Creemer Clarke of Wayste Court, Abingdon, and the couple had one son and two daughters.

He worked as a merchant like his father, and became a partner in the firm of W. and A. McArthur, Colonial Merchants. He was a Director of the Bank of Australasia. He was Mas Commr. for New South Wales at the Colonial and Indian Exhibition in 1886.

McArthur was elected to Parliament for Buckrose at the 1886 general election, with a majority of a single vote, but was unseated on a scrutiny being held and the seat was awarded to the Conservative candidate, Christopher Sykes. He entered Parliament for St Austell in an 1887 by-election, a seat he held until 1908. McArthur served in the Liberal administrations of William Ewart Gladstone and the Earl of Rosebery as a Junior Lord of the Treasury from 1892 to 1895.

McArthur died on 7 June 1923 at a private hospital in Sydney, aged 66, and was interred 8 June at South Head Cemetery.

Parliament of the United Kingdom
Preceded by Christopher Sykes	Member of Parliament for Buckrose; 1886 – 1886	Succeeded by Christopher Sykes
Preceded by William Copeland Borlase	Member of Parliament for St Austell; 1887–1908	Succeeded by Thomas Agar-Robartes
Political offices
Preceded by Sidney Herbert; William Walrond; Sir Herbert Maxwell	Junior Lord of the Treasury; 1892–1895; With: T. E. Ellis; Richard Causton	Succeeded by Henry Torrens Anstruther; William Hayes Fisher; Lord Stanley
