= Castle Horneck =

Historic site in Cornwall, England

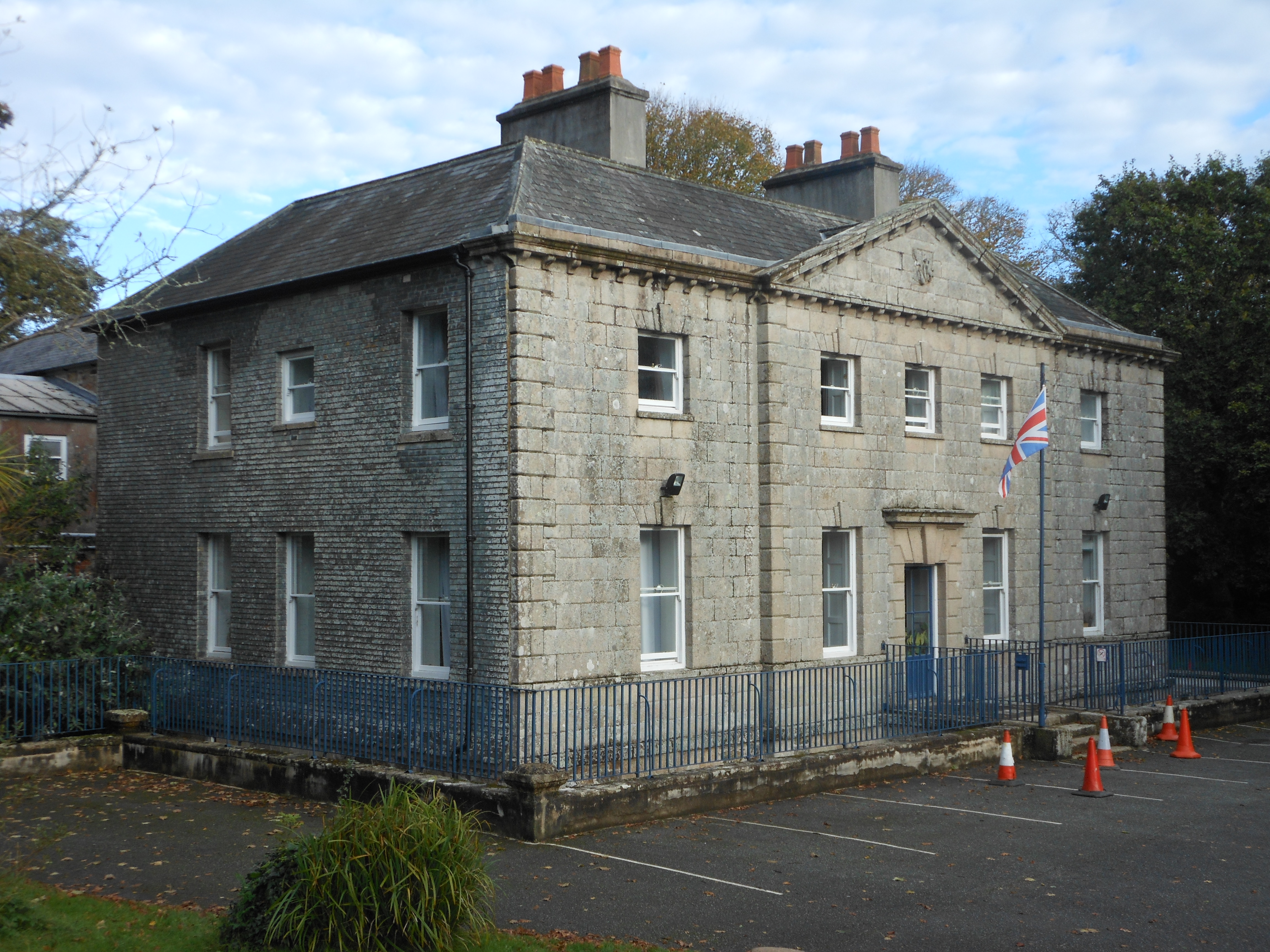

General information
- Architectural style: Georgian
- Location: Penzance; Cornwall
- Coordinates: 50.11784°N 5.55814°W
- Construction started: 12th-century
- Client: John Tyre
- Owner: Youth Hostels Association (England & Wales)

Website
- Penzance YHA
- Location within Cornwall

Listed Building – Grade II*
- Official name: Castle Horneck
- Designated: 7 February 1974
- Reference no.: 1143172

Castle Horneck is a Grade II* listed building, and refurbished Georgian mansion to the west of the Cornish town of Penzance. It is currently owned by the Youth Hostels Association (YHA) and has been used as a youth hostel since 1950.

== Toponymy ==
Castle Horneck derives from Castelhornek in a 1335 manuscript and Kestel Hornek from a 1395 manuscript. It was spelt Kestell Horneke in an old deed. Hornek means iron or ferric in Cornish.

== History ==
The site began as a 12th-century castle. This was demolished in the Tudor period and replaced with a residence owned by the Levelis family. In the early 18th century, it became the ancestral home of the Borlase family, with the family line dying out in 1939. During the Second World War, it housed evacuee children and then became a youth hostel.

=== Medieval castle ===
Also referred to as Castle Hornocke and Iron Castle; it may be the site of a castle, which may have existed, near Penzance. It was built against feudal foes and, probably, pirates.

Castle Horneck is said to have been built by the Tyes family in the 12th century. In the 13th and 14th centuries, the Tyes were the Lords of the Manor of Alverton. Sir Henry Tyes was the Lord of Alverton and Castle Horneck in 1284. This was the first mention of Penzance, and the Manor of Alverton was influential in the history and development of the town.

Sir Henry Tyes' son, also called Henry Tyes, was Baron Tyes of Castle Horneck. Another Henry Tyes, Baron Tyes II, was beheaded as a rebel in 1511. Castle Horneck was an ancient baronial castle, the only true baronial castle in the Land's End district.

=== Levelis family ownership ===
The castle was pulled down and a Tudor residence erected. The family Levelis, also known as Levale or Lavelis, lived in the area for 600 years. They lived at Castle Horneck before moving to Trewoofe in St Buryan (near Lamorna). In the early 16th century, Thomas Lavelis of Castle Horneck inherited Trewoofe when he married Joanna, the youngest daughter of John de Trewoofe.

=== Early Borlase family ownership ===
Castle Horneck became the ancient home of the Borlase family in the early 18th century, after they moved from Pendeen Manor, now Pendeen Farm. John Borlase of Pendeen, twice parliamentary representative for the borough of St Ives, bought Castle Horneck before 1718 for his eldest son, Walter.

In c. 1720, the front of the house was rebuilt by Walter Borlase. He lived at Castle Horneck and, by 1740, he had completely rebuilt it.

Walter Borlase became vicar of Madron in 1720, remaining in the role for 55 years, and, in 1756, he also became vice-warden of the Stannaries. He married Margaret Pendarves, and together they had 15 children, including 6 sons, but none of them produced an heir. On Walter's death in 1776, Castle Horneck was inherited by his son Samuel, who died in 1801, passing the property to his brother William, who died in 1812. Castle Horneck was then passed to their cousin and Walter's nephew John in 1812, who died the following year, leaving Castle Horneck to his son, Samuel Borlase.

=== Samuel Borlase's ownership ===
In 1819, Samuel Borlase was the owner and occupier of Castle Horneck in the parish of Maddern.

A paper mill operated in the confines of Castle Horneck behind the stables. It was first mentioned in 1819, described as "small" in 1839 and offered for sale in 1841. Work had ceased there by 1850.

In the 1860s the Borlase family were listed as one of two major landholders in the parish of Morvah. Samuel Borlase died at home at Castle Horneck on 24 November 1866 aged 67.

Samuel Borlase's younger brother, Admiral John Borlase, never owned the property, but he hosted the Penzance Natural History and Antiquarian Society at Castle Horneck in 1890. He died in Devonport on 17th March 1895 aged 84.

=== John Borlase's ownership ===
John Borlase, J.P., who was William Copeland Borlase's older brother and also a Cornish antiquary, inherited Castle Horneck, but his work took him away from Penzance.

Builders were sought in 1878 for making alterations and additions to the mansion house, and, in 1879, the house was modernised with larger windows on the front of the house and annexes built on the east and north. At that time there were extensive grounds with good specimens of giant redwood and the largest hollies in the neighbourhood. In the 19th century, the remains of the Tudor residence were also removed.

In April 1880 the house was leased to the Reverend Franklyn Tonkin, the vicar of Madron. His son, Ernest Tonkin, died in Canada in 1882. In 1883, he sought builders for a parsonage house in Madron. When the house was leased in 1880, William Copeland Borlase, who was born at Castle Horneck in 1848, was living at nearby Laregan House.

The Castle Horneck mansion house was offered for rent in 1884. In 1885, a tortoiseshell-coloured Persian kitten was lost from Castle Horneck.

John Borlase, his wife, Lydia Noell Peters, and their two daughters later settled down in his ancestral home.

In 1884, he hosted the annual festival of the Girls' Friendly Society at the house.

Mrs Borlase died suddenly in September 1886 aged 58. John Borlase died of paralysis at Castle Horneck in December 1889 after some hours of unconsciousness and some years of ill health.

=== Lydia and Caroline Borlase's ownership ===
By 1893, John Borlase's daughters, the Misses Borlase, were the ladies of the manor at Morvah. At the permission of the sisters, the house was the site of garde fêtes, including concerts in August 1891; a fundraiser for St Mary's Girl School, Penzance, in 1899; an SPG meeting in 1900; a fundraiser for the Girls' Friendly Society Lodge and Training Home at Falmouth in 1908; a picnic for the Madron Women's Institute in 1934; a picnic for the Penzance Girl Guides in June 1936; and the Madron Festival in July 1936. In 1894, they also hosted a tea party for the Penzance Natural History and Antiquarian Society.

Caroline Anne Borlase died at Castle Horneck in September 1934 aged 76. She left an estate with a gross value of £35,595, leaving the majority to her sister. Her sister Lydia Harris Borlase died in April 1939 aged 84. She left an estate with a gross value of £63,158. After her death, the house, lodge, gardens and over 65 acres were offered for sale at auction, but none of the Castle Horneck Estate lots sold. While the site was on the market in October 1939, the Education Committee recommended acquiring a site on Castle Horneck Estate to build a new boys' school. It was sold to a private purchaser and then almost immediately requisitioned by the town council.

=== Hostel ===
During the Second World War, Castle Horneck was one of four hostels in Penzance that housed "difficult" evacuee children. The children were cared for by the matron, who was Mrs Cameron in 1940 and Mrs Bacon in 1941, along with staff and volunteer helpers.

In 1945, the Castle Horneck Estate was owned by alderman C. B. Adams.

By 1950, it had been sold to the Holiday Fellowship. It remains in use as a youth hostel.

== Superstitions ==
The sight of a white rabbit near the cottage at Castle Horneck was a harbinger of the death of a member of the Borlase family.

== Ecology ==
The species Large Atlantic Pocket-moss (Fissidens serrulatus) was first recorded in England by W. Curnow (1809–1887) in 1867 in the Larriggan River at Castle Horneck. The stream was regularly visited by bryologists, including Victorian bryologist H. N. Dixon (1861–1944), and the moss persisted at the site in 2012.
