= Sir William Salusbury-Trelawny, 8th Baronet =

British politician

William Salusbury-Trelawny
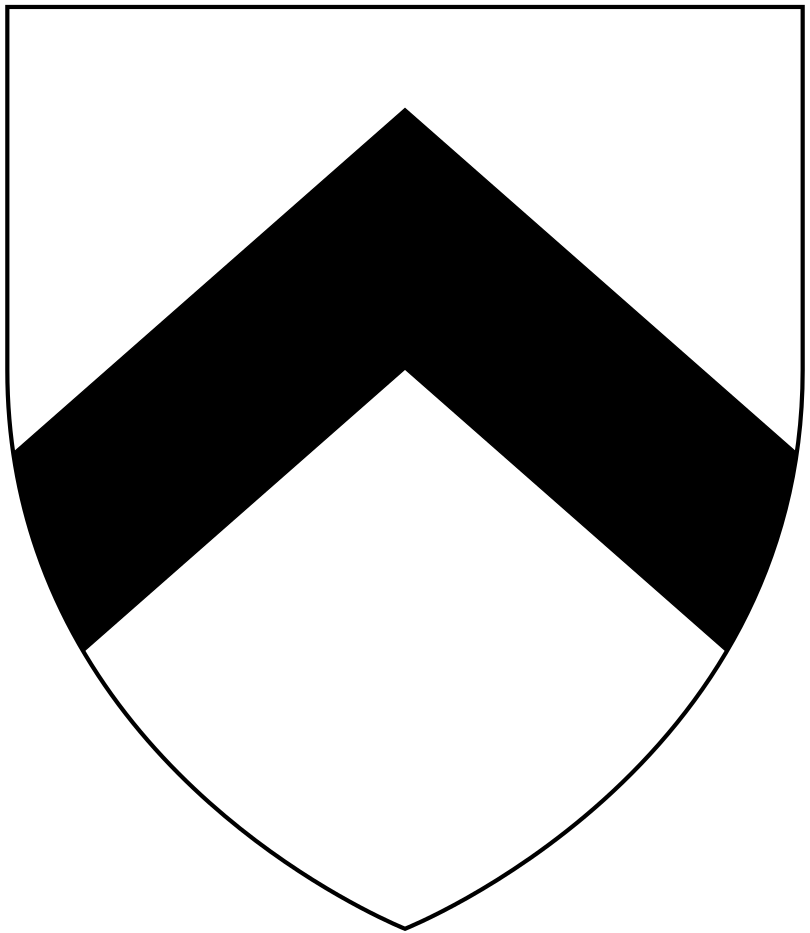
- Arms of Trelawny: Argent, a chevron sable

Member of Parliament for Cornwall East
- In office 1832–1837 Serving with Sir William Molesworth
- Preceded by: New constituency
- Succeeded by: Edward Eliot; Sir Hussey Vivian

Personal details
- Born: William Trelawny; 4 July 1781
- Died: 15 November 1856 (aged 75)

Sir William Lewis Salusbury-Trelawny, 8th Baronet (4 July 1781 – 15 November 1856), was a British politician.

Born William Trelawny, he assumed in 1802 the additional surname of Salusbury.

He served as High Sheriff of Cornwall in 1811 and later sat as member of parliament for Cornwall East from 1832 to 1837. He served as Lord-Lieutenant of Cornwall from 1839 to 1856.

Salusbury-Trelawny died in November 1856, aged 69. He had married in 1807 Patience Christian Carpenter; they had several children. He was succeeded by his second son John as his eldest son Owen had died at a young age in 1830.

== Sources ==
- Leigh Rayment's Historical List of MPs

Parliament of the United Kingdom
New constituency	Member of Parliament for Cornwall East; 1832 – 1837; With: Sir William Molesworth	Succeeded by Lord Eliot; Sir Hussey Vivian
Honorary titles
Preceded by The Earl of Mount Edgcumbe	Lord-Lieutenant of Cornwall; 1839–1856	Succeeded by The Lord Vivian
Baronetage of England
Preceded by Harry Trelawny	Baronet (of Trelawny); 1834–1856	Succeeded by John Salusbury-Trelawny
