= 1915 St Austell by-election =

UK Parliamentary by-election

The 1915 St Austell by-election was held on 24 November 1915. The by-election was held due to the incumbent Liberal MP, Thomas Agar-Robartes, dying of wounds sustained in the Battle of Loos in the First World War. It was won by the Liberal candidate Sir Francis Layland-Barratt who was unopposed due to a War-time electoral pact.
