= 1908 St Austell by-election =

UK Parliamentary by-election

The 1908 St Austell by-election was held on 5 February 1908. The by-election was held due to the resignation of the incumbent Liberal MP, William Alexander McArthur. It was won by the Liberal candidate Thomas Agar-Robartes, who was unopposed.
