= St Austell (constituency) =

Former parliamentary constituency in the United Kingdom

- Former borough constituency for the House of Commons

1885–1918
- Seats: One
- Created from: East Cornwall and West Cornwall
- Replaced by: Penryn and Falmouth, North Cornwall

St Austell was a parliamentary constituency centred on the town of St Austell in Cornwall. It returned one Member of Parliament (MP) to the House of Commons of the Parliament of the United Kingdom.

The constituency was created for the 1885 general election, and abolished for the 1918 general election.

== Boundaries ==
The Sessional Divisions of Powder East and South, and Ryder, and the civil parishes of Ladock and St Blazey.

== Members of Parliament ==
Election	Member	Party
1885	William Copeland Borlase	Liberal
1887	William Alexander McArthur	Liberal
1908	Thomas Agar-Robartes	Liberal
1915	Sir Francis Layland-Barratt	Liberal
1918	constituency abolished	

== Election results ==
=== Elections in the 1880s ===
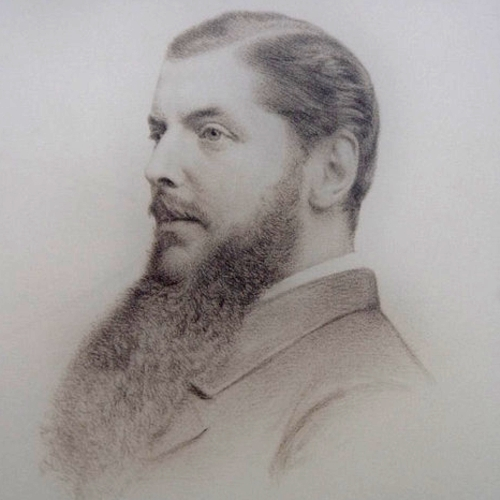
Borlase

General election 1885: St Austell
Party	Candidate	Votes	%	±%
Liberal	William Copeland Borlase	4,464	67.2	
Conservative	John Heywood Johnstone	2,183	32.8	
Majority		2,281	34.4	
Turnout		6,647	75.0	
Registered electors		8,860		
Liberal win (new seat)				

General election 1886: St Austell
Party	Candidate	Votes	%	±%
Liberal	William Copeland Borlase	Unopposed		
Liberal hold				

Borlase's resignation caused a by-election.

McArthur

By-election 18 May 1887: St Austell
Party	Candidate	Votes	%	±%
Liberal	William Alexander McArthur	3,540	51.5	N/A
Liberal Unionist	Edward Brydges Willyams	3,329	48.5	New
Majority		211	3.0	N/A
Turnout		6,869	77.3	N/A
Registered electors		8,883		
Liberal hold		Swing	N/A	

=== Elections in the 1890s ===
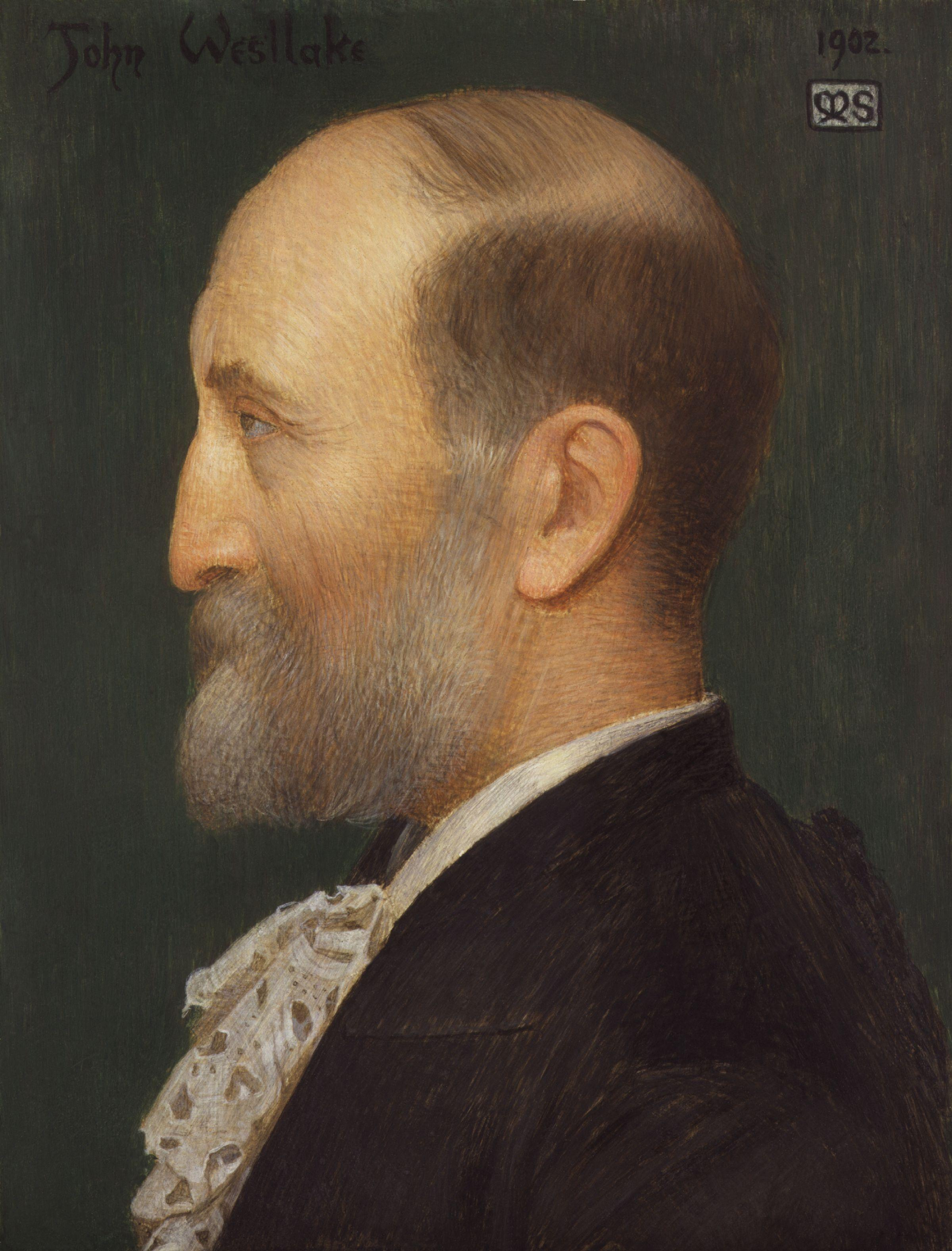
Westlake

General election 1892: St Austell
Party	Candidate	Votes	%	±%
Liberal	William Alexander McArthur	4,201	61.8	N/A
Liberal Unionist	John Westlake	2,593	38.2	N/A
Majority		1,608	23.6	N/A
Turnout		6,794	75.4	N/A
Registered electors		9,005		
Liberal hold		Swing	N/A	

McArthur was appointed a Lord Commissioner of the Treasury, requiring a by-election.

By-election, 23 Aug 1892
Party	Candidate	Votes	%	±%
Liberal	William Alexander McArthur	Unopposed		
Liberal hold				

General election 1895: St Austell
Party	Candidate	Votes	%	±%
Liberal	William Alexander McArthur	4,193	57.6	−4.2
Liberal Unionist	Michael Williams	3,092	42.4	+4.2
Majority		1,101	15.2	−8.4
Turnout		7,285	79.1	+3.7
Registered electors		9,213		
Liberal hold		Swing	−4.2	

=== Elections in the 1900s ===
General election 1900: St Austell
Party	Candidate	Votes	%	±%
Liberal	William Alexander McArthur	Unopposed		
Liberal hold				

General election 1906: St Austell
Party	Candidate	Votes	%	±%
Liberal	William Alexander McArthur	5,667	69.3	N/A
Liberal Unionist	Richard Garnett	2,516	30.7	New
Majority		3,151	38.6	N/A
Turnout		8,183	80.0	N/A
Registered electors		10,235		
Liberal hold		Swing	N/A	

1908 St Austell by-election
Party	Candidate	Votes	%	±%
Liberal	Thomas Agar-Robartes	Unopposed		
Liberal hold				

=== Elections in the 1910s ===
Agar-Robartes

General election January 1910: St Austell
Party	Candidate	Votes	%	±%
Liberal	Thomas Agar-Robartes	6,225	66.5	−2.8
Liberal Unionist	Francis Tyringham Higgins Bernard	3,138	33.5	+2.8
Majority		3,087	33.0	−5.6
Turnout		9,363	85.4	+5.4
Registered electors		10,968		
Liberal hold		Swing	−2.8	

General election December 1910: St Austell
Party	Candidate	Votes	%	±%
Liberal	Thomas Agar-Robartes	Unopposed		
Liberal hold				

General Election 1914–15:

Layland-Barratt

Another General Election was required to take place before the end of 1915. The political parties had been making preparations for an election to take place and by July 1914, the following candidates had been selected;

- Liberal: Thomas Agar-Robartes
- Unionist:

1915 St Austell by-election
Party	Candidate	Votes	%	±%
Liberal	Francis Layland-Barratt	Unopposed		
Liberal hold				
