= Thomas Agar-Robartes, 1st Baron Robartes =

British politician (1808–1882)

Thomas James Agar-Robartes, 1st Baron Robartes (18 March 1808 – 9 March 1882), was a British politician.

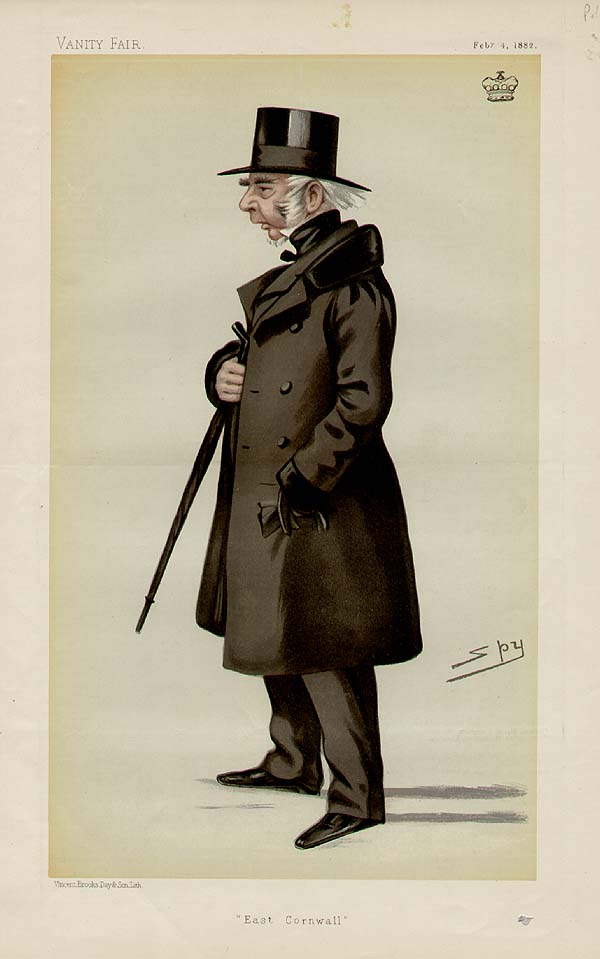
Vanity Fair caricature. Caption reads East Cornwall

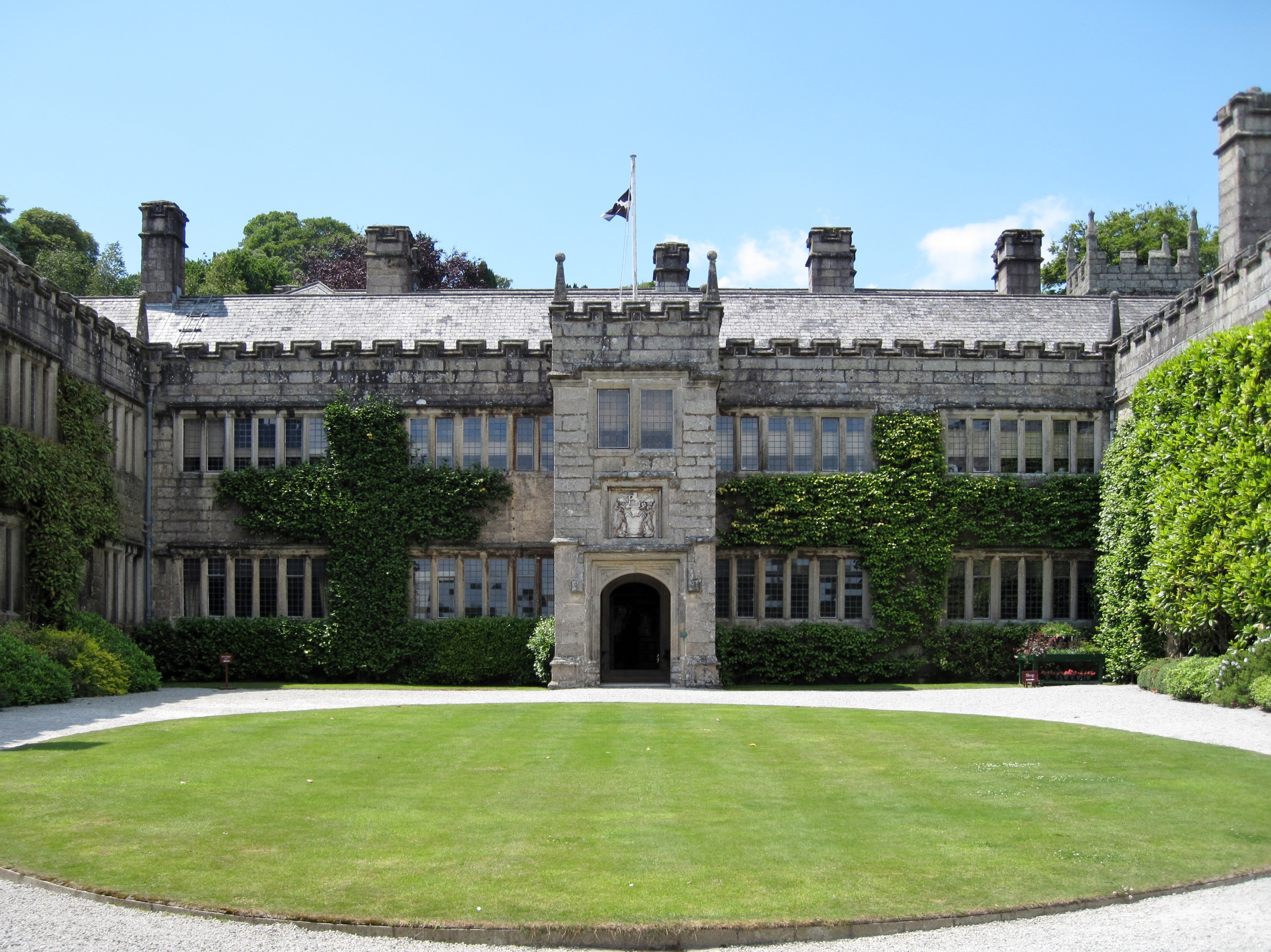
Lanhydrock House

== Background ==
Robartes was the son of the Hon. Charles Bagenal Agar, youngest son of James Agar, 1st Viscount Clifden. His mother was Anna Maria Hunt, heiress of Lanhydrock, great-niece of Henry Robartes, 3rd Earl of Radnor and 4th Baron Robartes (which titles became extinct in 1757; see the Earl of Radnor 1679 creation for more information). He adopted the Robartes name by warrant in 1822 and inherited the Lanhydrock estate.

He commissioned the architect George Gilbert Scott to renovate Lanhydrock House but in 1881 it was badly damaged by a fire in which his wife died of smoke inhalation.

== Political career ==
Robartes was returned to Parliament for Cornwall East in 1847, a seat he held until 1868. In 1869 the barony of Robartes held by his mother's ancestors was revived when he was raised to the peerage as Baron Robartes, of Lanhydrock, and of Truro in the County of Cornwall.

== Family ==
Lord Robartes died at 1 Dean Street, Park Lane, London on 9 March 1882, aged 73. He had married in 1839 Juliana Pole-Carew (1812–1881) of Antony House and had one son Thomas Agar-Robartes, 6th Viscount Clifden, who succeeded him in the barony and to Lanhydrock. In 1899 Thomas also succeeded his second cousin as the sixth Viscount Clifden.

Parliament of the United Kingdom
Preceded by William Rashleigh; William Henry Pole Carew	Member of Parliament for Cornwall East; 1847–1868; With: William Henry Pole Carew 1847–1852; Nicholas Kendall 1852–1868	Succeeded by Sir John Salusbury-Trelawney, Bt; Edward Brydges Willyams
Peerage of the United Kingdom
New creation	Baron Robartes; 1869–1882	Succeeded by Thomas Charles Agar-Robartes
