= 1887 St Austell by-election =

UK parliamentary by-election

The 1887 St Austell by-election was a by-election held on 18 May 1887 for the British House of Commons constituency of St Austell in Cornwall.

The by-election was triggered by the resignation of the serving Liberal Party Member of Parliament (MP), William Copeland Borlase. It was retained by the Liberal candidate William Alexander McArthur.

== Result ==
McArthur

St Austell by-election, 1887
Party	Candidate	Votes	%	±%
Liberal	William Alexander McArthur	3,540	51.5	N/A
Liberal Unionist	Edward William Brydges Willyams	3,329	48.5	New
Majority		211	3.0	N/A
Turnout		6,869	77.3	N/A
Liberal hold		Swing	N/A	
