= Nicholas Kendall (Conservative politician) =

British politician

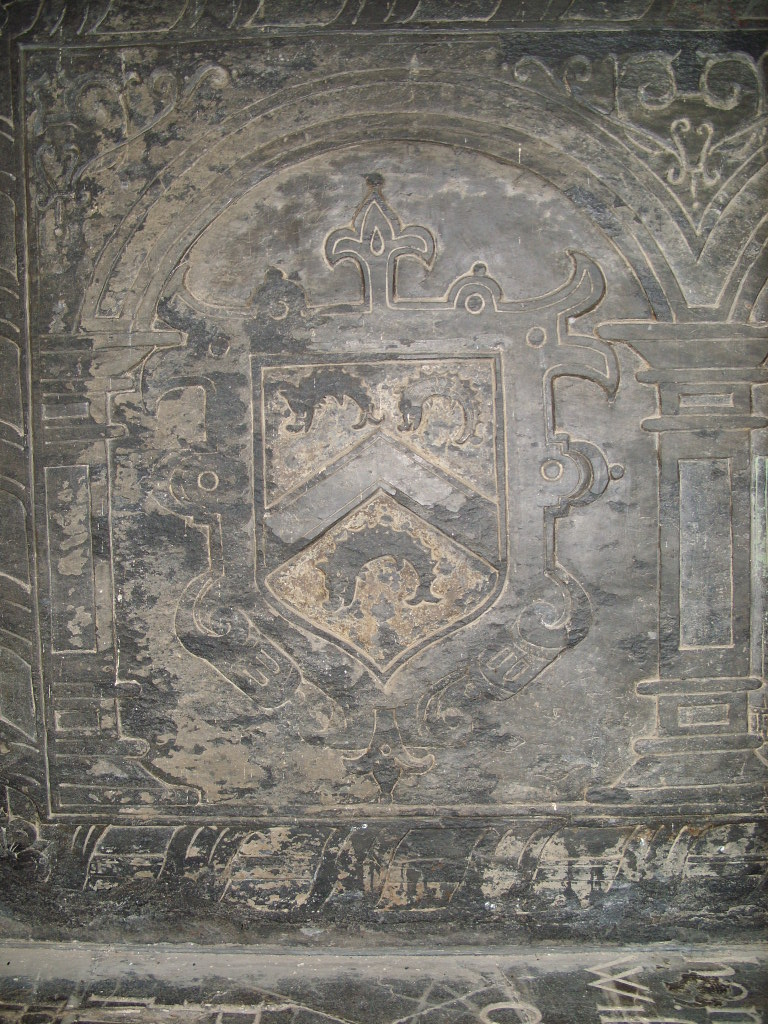
Coat of arms of the Kendall family of Pelyn in Cornwall.

Nicholas Kendall (22 December 1800 – 8 June 1878) was born in St Mabyn, Cornwall. Kendall was High Sheriff of Cornwall in 1847 and a Conservative Member of Parliament (MP). In 1858 he was chairman of the River Thames Select Committee during The Great Stink

The son of a vicar, Nicholas Kendall was a member of a Cornish landowning family. He was educated at Trinity College, Oxford. He was High Sheriff of Cornwall in 1847. In the same year he suppressed a riot at St Austell, on 11 June. He was returned to parliament for East Cornwall, in conjunction with Thomas Agar-Robartes, in 1852, which position he retained without intermission until 1868. Mr Kendall was one of the county magistrates and also a deputy-lieutenant, and deputy warden of the Stannaries. For some time he was captain of the Royal Cornwall Rangers Militia.

Parliament of the United Kingdom
Preceded by William Pole-Carew; Thomas Agar-Robartes	Member of Parliament for East Cornwall; 1852 – 1868; With: Thomas Agar-Robartes	Succeeded by Sir John Salusbury-Trelawny, Bt; Edward Brydges Willyams
