= William Battie =

English physician

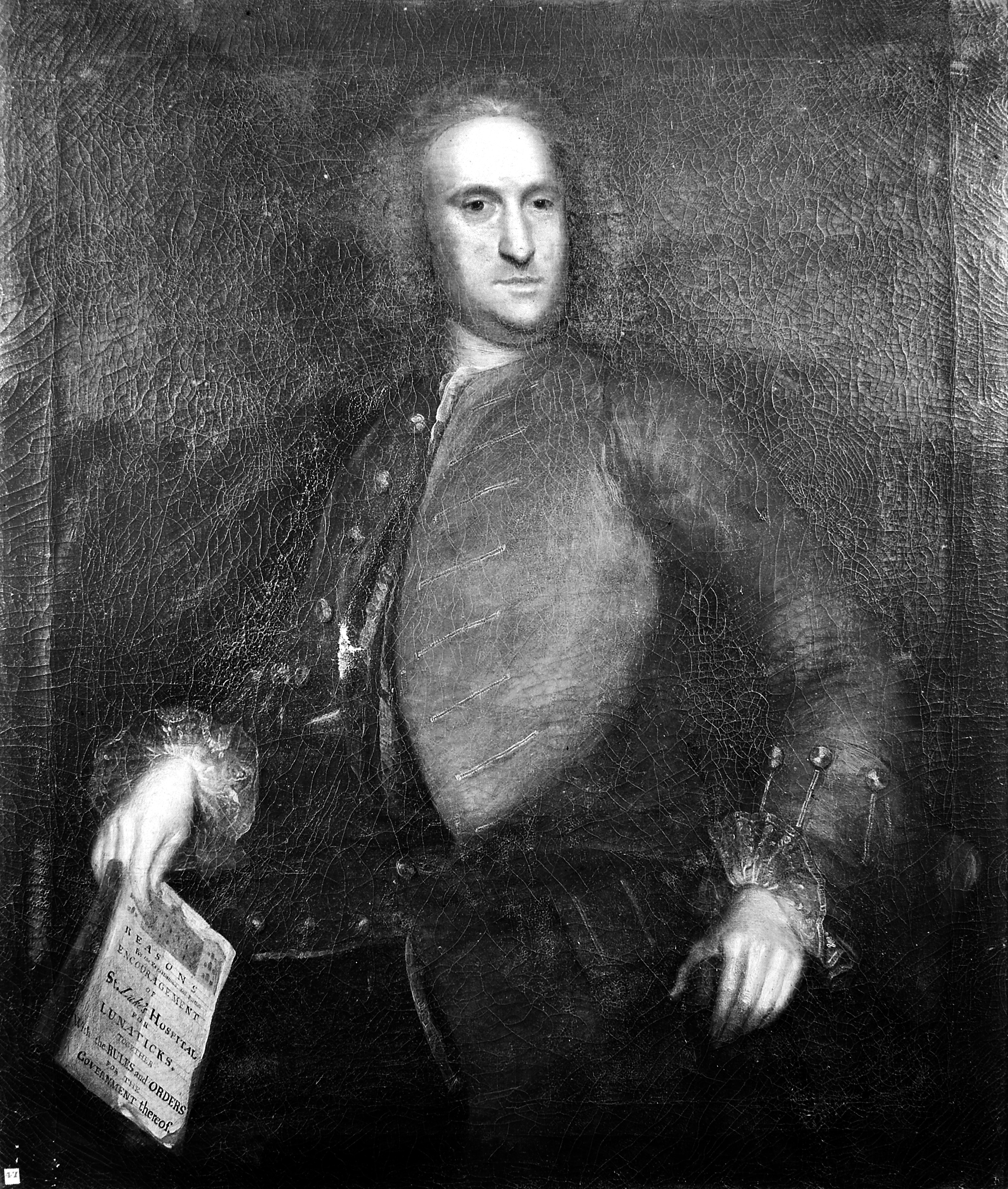

William Battie (sometimes spelt Batty; 1 September 1704 – 13 June 1776) was an English physician who published, in 1758, A Treatise on Madness, a highly influential book on the use of institutionalisation and shock therapy as methods of treating mental illness. He was President of the Royal College of Physicians in 1764.

== Biography ==
Battie was born in 1704, the son of a vicar, Reverend Edward Battie, in Modbury, Devon. He studied at Eton and King's College, Cambridge. In 1737, he completed his degree, moved to London and was admitted as a Candidate of the Royal College of Physicians, becoming a Fellow in the following year.

In 1751, Battie was appointed as the first chief physician of the newly-established St Luke's Hospital for Lunatics, built in response to overwhelming demand and concern about perceived abuse at the nearby Bethlem Royal Hospital. Battie was also the proprietor of a large private asylum, through which he acquired a substantial fortune.

He died following a stroke in 1776 and was buried alongside his wife in Kingston, Surrey. His total estate was estimated at £100,000.

== Psychiatric work ==
In A Treatise on Madness, Battie drew a distinction between "original madness" and "consequential madness", suggesting that the former is usually innate and incurable whereas the latter can be treated through complete isolation, a strict regimen managed by a physician and selective use of emetic drugs or other forms of purging. These two categories could be considered a precursor to modern distinctions of "organic" and "functional" illness. Though he mostly defined the causes of madness in biological terms, Battie recognised that lifestyle and diet could impact a person's mental state. At the time, incarceration of the mentally ill - or socially inconvenient - was becoming more common: Battie did not challenge this practice, but instead suggested that the isolation of a patient from their friends, family and servants could itself act as a form of treatment.

Shortly after Battie's treatise was written, Rival physician John Monro of Bethlem Hospital published a response, critiquing it for being overly complex, vague and lacking in evidence. On the topic of "original madness" for example, he wrote:

"Of what use it may hereafter prove to have thus divided madness into original and consequential is not my business to enquire at present. The first of these is entirely the doctor's invention, it never having been mentioned by any writer, or observed by any physician. What is the cause of original madness? It is unknown. What are the symptoms? There are none. The method of cure? It admits of no cure, unless nature has a mind to recompense a little its ill-conditioned fate by a perfect recovery without our assistance and beyond our expectation."

Both the St Luke's Hospital for Lunatics and Bethlem Royal Hospital practised involuntary confinement and use of restraints, but only the latter was open to public visitors. These public hospitals competed with a growing number of private institutions, including Battie's own properties.
