= Agar (name) =

Agar is both a surname and a given name.

== People with the surname ==
- Alf Agar (1904–1989), English footballer
- Allan Agar (born 1949) (father of Richard Agar), English rugby league footballer and coach
- Andrew Agar (1865–1948), Canadian politician
- Andrew Agar (cricketer) (born 1956), English cricketer
- Ashton Agar (born 1993), Australian cricketer
- Augustus Agar (1890–1968), British Royal Navy commodore and recipient of the Victoria Cross
- Bernice Agar (1885–1976), Australian photographer
- Carl Agar (1901–1968), Canadian aviator
- Charles Agar (disambiguation), several people
- Charles d'Agar (1669–1723), French painter
- Edward Agar, 5th Earl of Normanton (1910–1967), British and Irish peer and landowner
- Eileen Agar (1899–1991), Argentine-born British painter and photographer
- George Agar, 1st Baron Callan (1751–1815), Irish politician
- George Agar (rugby league) (1902–1966), Australian rugby league footballer
- Herbert Agar (1897–1980), American journalist and editor, and Pulitzer Prize winner
- Jacques d'Agar (1640–1716), French portrait painter, son of Charles d'Agar
- James Agar (disambiguation), several people
- John Agar (1921–2002), American actor and husband of Shirley Temple
- John Samuel Agar (1773–1858), English portrait painter and engraver
- Madeline Agar (1874–1967), English landscape designer, sister of Wilfred
- Malik Agar, Sudanese politician
- Mehmet Ağar (born 1951), Turkish former police chief, politician, government minister and leader of the Democratic Party
- Nat Agar (1888–1978), English-American soccer player, coach, referee, team owner and league executive
- Nicholas Agar (born 1965), Australian professor of ethics
- Richard Agar (son of Allan Agar), English rugby league footballer and coach
- Shaun Agar, 6th Earl of Normanton (1945–2019), a British and Irish landowner and powerboat racer
- Sidney James Agar, 4th Earl of Normanton (1865–1933), British and Irish peer
- Welbore Ellis Agar (1735–1805), commissioner of HM Revenue and Customs and art collector
- Welbore Ellis Agar, 2nd Earl of Normanton (1778–1868), Irish peer and landowner
- Wes Agar (born 1997), Australian cricketer
- Wilfred Eade Agar (1882–1951), Anglo-Australian zoologist, brother of Madeline
- William Agar (1814–1906), English cricketer
- William Seth Agar (1815–1872), English Roman Catholic priest

== Given name ==
=== In Russian ===
In the Russian language, the name "Ага́рь" (Agar) is used predominantly in the biblical context and derives from "Hagar"—a person mentioned in the Book of Genesis. In 1924–1930, the name was included into various Soviet calendars.

=== People with the given name ===
- Agar Adamson (1865–1929), a well-to-do Canadian who married the Toronto heiress Mabel Cawthra
- Agar Rodney Adamson (1901–1954), Canadian mining engineer and politician
- Agar Wynne (1850–1934), Australian politician
