= Duke of Buccleuch collection =

Art collection in Scotland

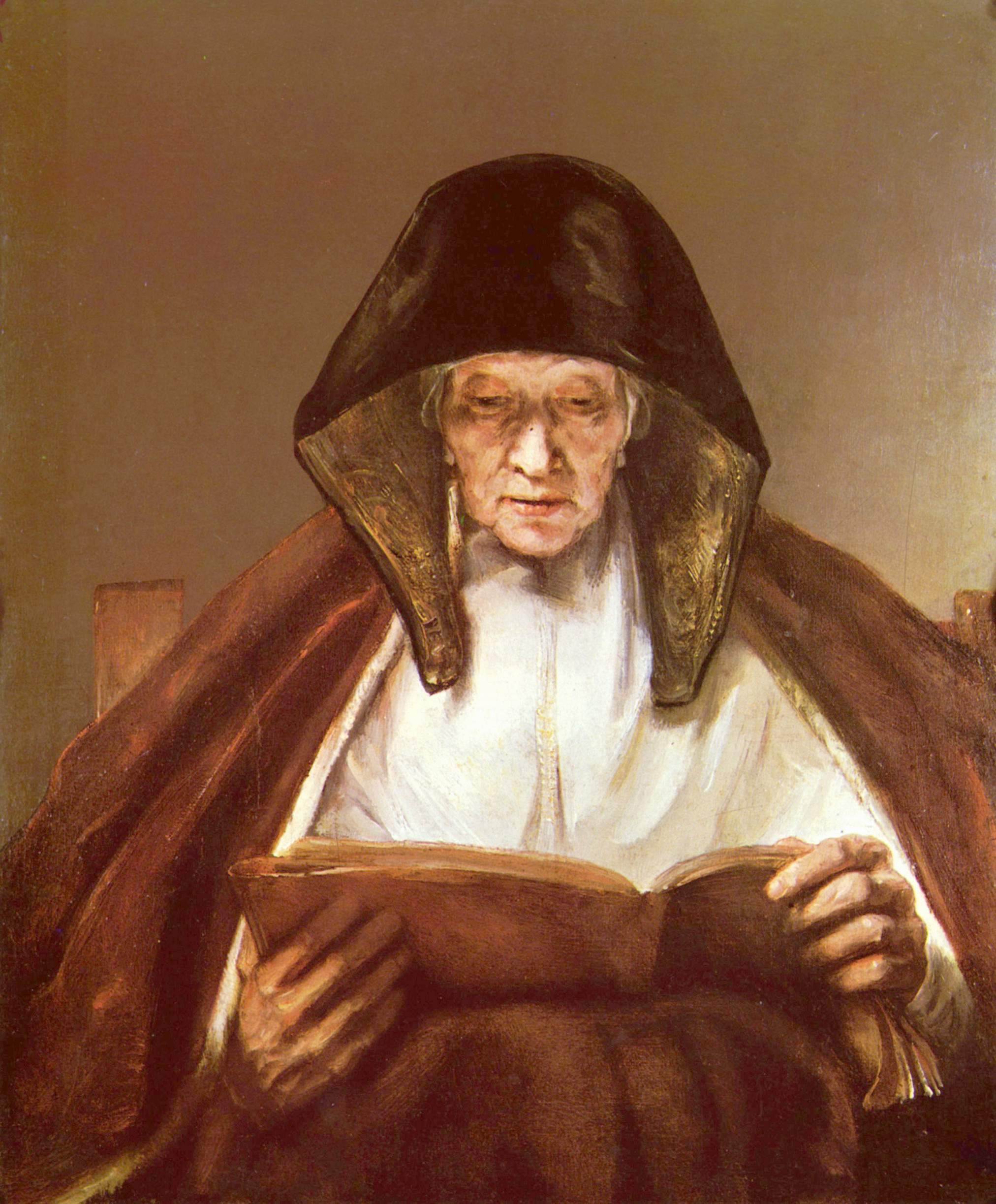
Old Woman Reading, Rembrandt, 1655

The art collection of the Duke of Buccleuch is mostly European. The holdings, principally collected over a period of 300 years, comprise some 500 paintings, 1,000 miniatures and an enormous selection of objets d'art including furniture, porcelain, armour, jewellery and silverwork. The vast majority of the collection is divided between three principal locations: Bowhill House, Drumlanrig Castle, both in Scotland, and Boughton House in England.

== Collection ==
=== Paintings and drawing ===
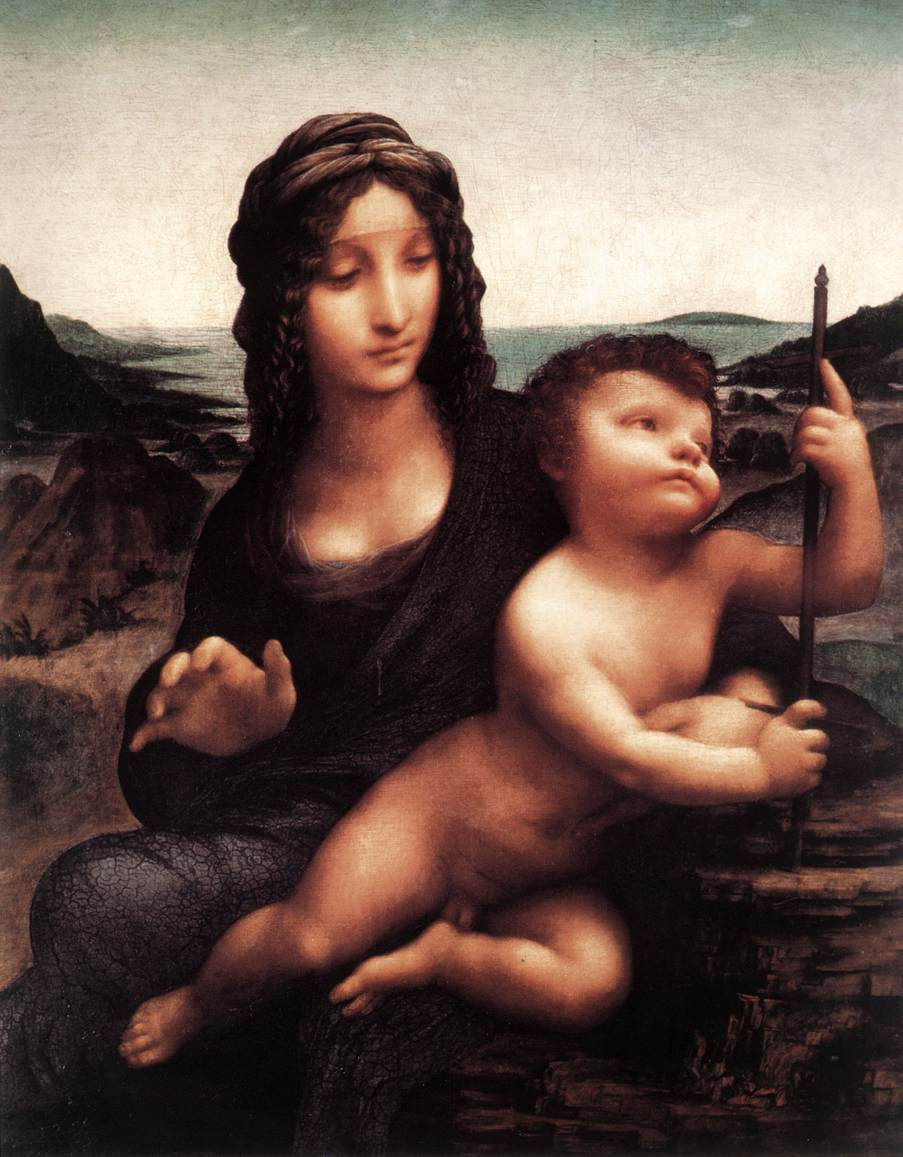
Madonna of the Yarnwinder, Leonardo da Vinci, 1501

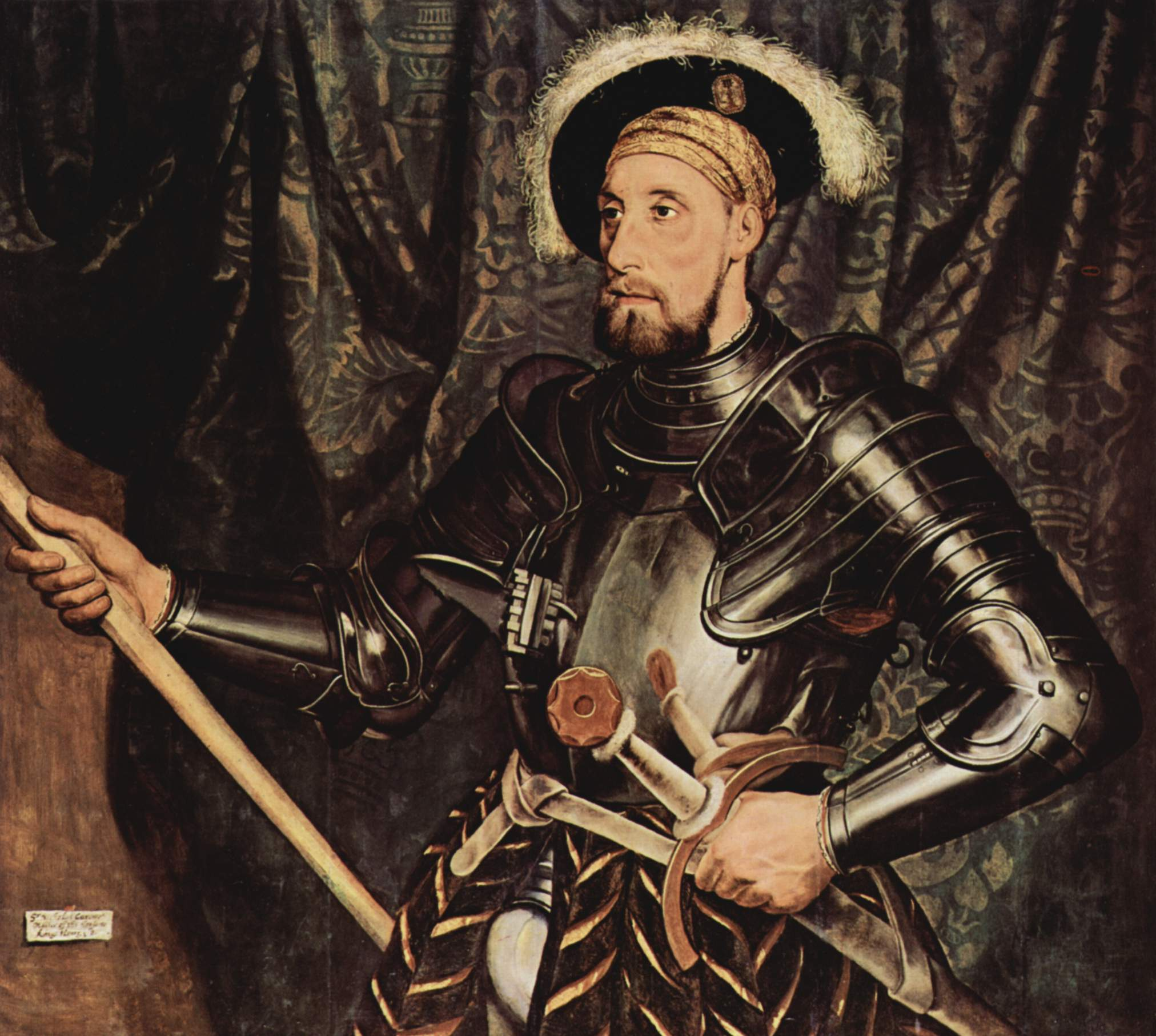
Portrait of Sir Nicholas Carew, Hans Holbein the Younger, 1532–33

Dutch School

- Cuyp, Aelbert Jacobsz
- Rembrandt, Harmenszoon van Rijn (Old Woman Reading, 1655 - one of Rembrandt's greatest works)
- Ruisdael, Jacob van - 2 paintings (Landscape, one of his three greatest works)
- Wouwerman, Philips
- Wyck, Jan - 5 paintings (Equestrian portrait of James Scott, 1st Duke of Monmouth and Buccleuch, c. 1670s)

English School

- Bardwell, Thomas - 10 paintings
- Beechey, William - 7 paintings
- Cotes, Francis - 2 paintings
- Gainsborough, Thomas - 6 paintings
- Kneller, Sir Godfrey - 30 paintings
- Lely, Sir Peter - 19 paintings
- Reynolds, Joshua - 6 paintings (Lady Caroline Scott, 1776)

Flemish School

- d'Arthois, Jacques
- Brueghel, Jan (the Younger)
- John de Critz (the Elder)
- Anthony van Dyck - 3x paintings and 40 grisaille portraits (painted for 'The Iconograph', 1645)
- Jan Gossaert, (known as Jan Mabuse)

- David Teniers the Younger - 2 paintings

French School

- d'Agar, Charles - 1 painting
- Bourdon, Sébastien - 3 paintings (Portrait of Wenceslaus Hollar, 1657)
- Danloux, Henri-Pierre - 5 paintings
- Dughet, Gaspard - 1 painting
- Dumont, François - 1 painting (Portrait of Marie-Antoinette)
- Elizabeth, Madame (of France) - 1 painting
- Heude, Nicolas - 2 paintings
- Lafrensen, Nicolas (the Younger) (known as Lavreince) - 1 painting
- Laroon, Marcellus - 1 painting
- Lefebvre, Claude
- Liotard, Jean-Étienne
- Lorrain, Claude (known as Claude Gellée) - 2 paintings (The Judgement of Paris (Lorrain's earliest mythological scene) and A Seaport (Lorrain's earliest conception of classical style), both 1633)
- Mare-richart, Florent-j. De La - 1 painting
- Monnoyer, Jean-Baptiste - 19 paintings
- Perréal, Jean - 1 painting
- Rousseau, Jacques - 1 painting
- Sueur, Eustache Le - 1 painting
- Sueur, Hubert Le - 1 painting
- Troy, François de - 1 painting
- Vernet, Claude Joseph - 2 paintings

German School

- Lucas Cranach the Elder

- Hans Holbein the Younger
- Mengs, Anton Raphael - 3 paintings

Italian School

- Baciccio, Il (known as Giambattista Gaulli) - 1 painting
- Bassano, Francesco (the Younger) - 1 painting
- Bassano, Leandro - 2 paintings
- Batoni, Pompeo - 1 painting
- Benaschi, Giovanni Battista - 1 painting
- Campi, Vincenzo - 1 painting
- Canaletto - 1 painting (View of Whitehall - one of Caneletto's greatest works)
- Caravaggio, Polidoro da - 1 painting
- Carpi, Girolamo da - 2 paintings
- Carracci, Annibale - 2 paintings and 1 drawing (A Young Man in a plumed hat)
- Carlo Dolci
- Il Garafalo, (Benvenuto Tisi)
- Gennari, Benedetto - 3 paintings
- Luca Giordano
- Granacci, Francesco - 1 painting
- Guardi, Francesco - 8 paintings
- Joli, Antonio - 1 painting
- Leonardo da Vinci - 1 painting (Madonna of the Yarnwinder, c. 1501)
- Mainardi, Sebastiano (known as Bastiano) - 1 painting
- Carlo Maratta
- Marieschi, Michele - 1 painting
- Panini, Giovanni Paolo - 1 painting
- Parmigianino - 1 painting
- Pasinelli, Lorenzo - 1 painting
- Penni, Giovanni Francesco - 2 drawings (Meeting of the Two Holy Families and The Vision of Ezekial, both c. 1526, two of the largest and most important renaissance drawings alongside the Raphael Cartoons)
- Il Pordenone, (known by Giovanni Antonio de' Sacchis) - 1 painting
- Puligo, Domenico - 1 painting
- Salvator Rosa
- Andrea Sacchi
- Francesco Solimena
- Alessandro Tiarini
- Francesco Zuccarelli
- Taddeo Zuccari

Scottish School

- Raeburn, Henry - 2 paintings

Spanish School

- Juan Pantoja de la Cruz - 2 paintings
- El Greco (The Adoration of the Shepherds, c. 1574–75)
- Bartolomé Esteban Murillo

== See also ==
- Dalkeith Palace
- Montagu House, Bloomsbury
- Montagu House, Whitehall

== Bibliography ==
- Montgomery-Massingberd, Hugh (1994), Great Houses of England & Wales, London: Lawrence King Publishing Ltd
- Montgomery-Massingberd, Hugh (1997), Great Houses of Scotland, London: Lawrence King Publishing Ltd
- Murdoch, Tessa (1992), Boughton House, The English Versailles, London: Faber and Faber Limited
- Boughton House (Guide Book), St. Ives: Photo Precision Limited, 1976
