= Charles Agar =

Charles Agar may refer to:

- Charles Agar (cricketer) (1877–1921), English cricketer
- Charles Agar (politician) (1882–1961), farmer and political figure in Saskatchewan, Canada
- Charles Agar, 1st Earl of Normanton (1736–1809), Anglo-Irish Protestant clergyman, Archbishop of Dublin, 1801–1809
- Charles Agar (Archdeacon of Emly) (1755–1789), Irish Anglican priest
- Charles Agar, rugby league footballer of the 1910s and 1920s for Wakefield Trinity, see List of Wakefield Trinity players

== See also ==
- Charles d'Agar (1669–1723), French painter
