= Madonna of the Yarnwinder =

Subject in paintings by Leonardo da Vinci

Madonna of the Yarnwinder (The Buccleuch Madonna)
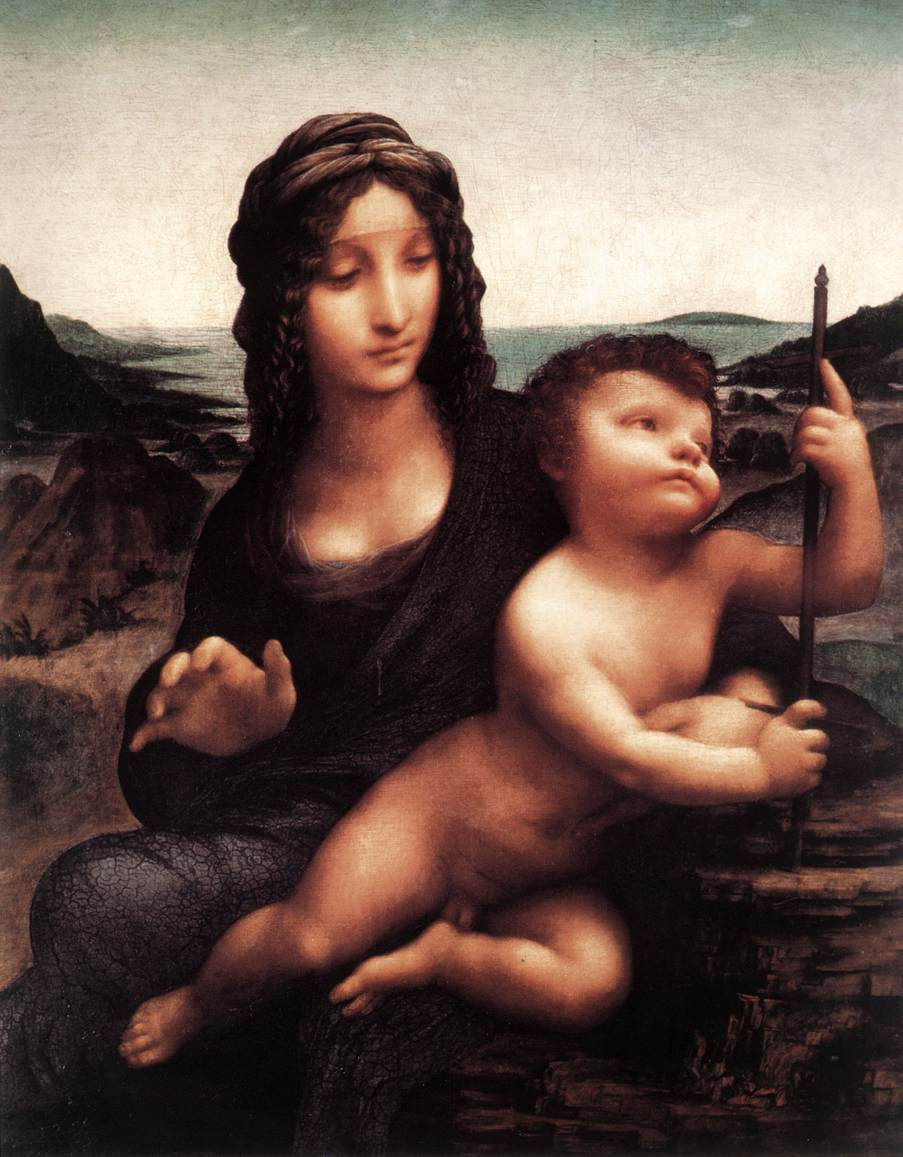
- Artists: Attributed to Leonardo da Vinci and another artist
- Type: Oil on walnut
- Dimensions: 48.3 cm × 36.9 cm (19.0 in × 14.5 in)
- Location: Scottish National Gallery, Edinburgh (on long-term loan from the Duke of Buccleuch collection)
- Owner: Richard Scott, 10th Duke of Buccleuch

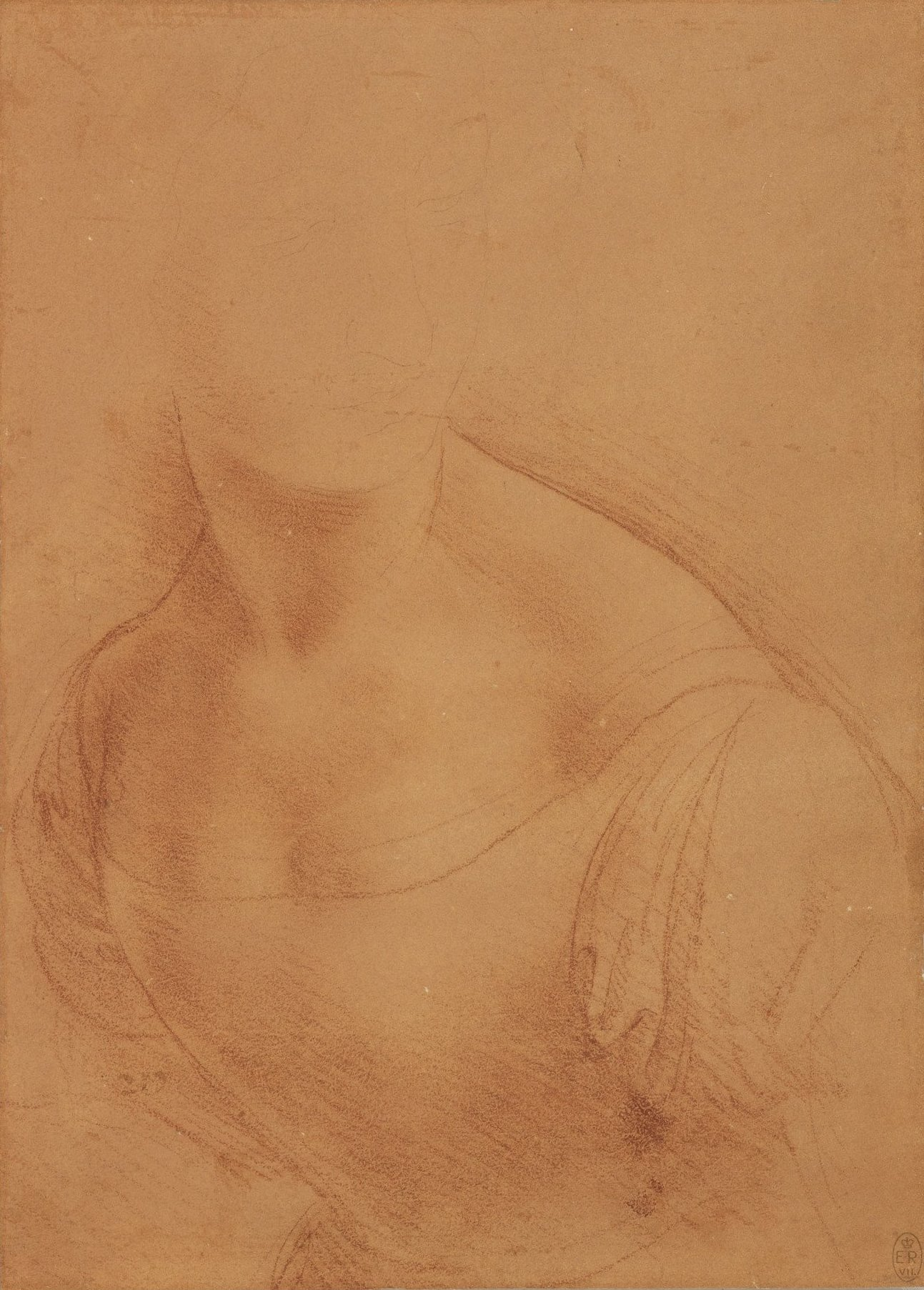
Red chalk study by Leonardo da Vinci that resembles the subject of two paintings attributed to him

The Madonna of the Yarnwinder (Italian: Madonna dei Fusi, "Madonna of the Spindles") is a subject depicted by Leonardo da Vinci in at least one, and perhaps two paintings begun in 1499 or later. Leonardo was recorded as being at work on one such painting in Florence in 1501 for Florimond Robertet, a secretary to King Louis XII of France. This may have been delivered to the French court in 1507, although scholars are divided on this point. The subject is known today from several versions. Two of the versions, now identified as the Buccleuch Madonna and the Lansdowne Madonna, are thought to be at least partly by Leonardo's hand. The underdrawings of both paintings show similar experimental changes made to the composition (or pentimenti), suggesting that both evolved concurrently in Leonardo's workshop. It is not unusual for others in a workshop to have completed works begun by the master of the workshop.

The composition shows Mary seated in a landscape with the Christ child, who gazes at a niddy-noddy used to collect spun yarn. Interpretations of the painting indicate that the niddy-noddy serves both as a symbol of Mary's domesticity and as a foreshadowing of the cross on which Christ was crucified. The painting's dynamic composition and the implied narrative were highly influential on later High Renaissance depictions of the Madonna and Child by artists such as Raphael and Andrea del Sarto.

== History ==
The earliest reference to a painting of this subject by Leonardo is in a letter of 14 April 1501 by Fra Pietro da Novellara, the head of the Carmelites in Florence, to Isabella d'Este, Marchioness of Mantua. Leonardo had recently returned to his native city following the French invasion of Milan in 1499; the intervening years he had spent first in Isabella's court, during which brief stay he produced a cartoon (now in the Louvre) for a portrait of her, and then in Venice. Isabella was determined to get a finished painting by Leonardo for her collection, and to that end she instructed Fra Pietro, her contact in Florence, to press Leonardo into agreeing to a commission. Two letters of reply by the friar survive. In the second, written after he had succeeded in meeting with the artist, he writes that Leonardo has become distracted by his mathematical pursuits and is busy working on a small religious painting for Florimond Robertet, which he goes on to describe:

"The little picture which he is doing is of a Madonna seated as if she were about to spin yarn. The Child has placed his foot on the basket of yarns and has grasped the yarn-winder and gazes attentively at four spokes that are in the form of a cross. As if desirous of the cross he smiles and holds it firm, and is unwilling to yield it to his Mother who seems to want to take it away from him."

The passage is valuable for being one of the few descriptions by a contemporary viewer of a work by Leonardo. The description matches the composition of the Buccleuch and Lansdowne Madonnas in all respects except that there is no basket in either painting. Robertet's painting was probably commissioned late in 1499 just before Leonardo left Milan, and was possibly begun there.

Scholars disagree on whether Robertet received his painting. In January 1507, Francesco Pandolfini, the Florentine ambassador to the French court in Blois, reported that “a little picture by [Leonardo’s] hand has recently been brought here and is held to be an excellent thing”. The Madonna does not, however, appear in a posthumous inventory of Robertet's collection made in 1532 (although the authenticity of the inventory has been called into question). One hypothesis holds that the painting passed from Robertet's collection into that of the French king, thus explaining its absence from the inventory. It is unclear, however, why it would have left the royal collection.

In 1525, two inventories were drawn up of the possessions of Leonardo's assistant and heir Salaì, who had died the preceding year. These mention a “Madonna with a Child in her Arms”. This note is thought to be evidence that one of the prime versions of the Madonna of the Yarnwinder remained in Leonardo's possession while another was sent to Robertet.

Neither of the paintings accepted as prime versions has a provenance that can be traced back to Robertet or Salaì, or further back than the eighteenth century, although it is thought that the Buccleuch Madonna was in France at that time. However, the Lansdowne Madonna could easily have been bought by its earliest known owners from a French collection in the period following the French Revolution, when many works with a French aristocratic provenance were bought by British collectors.

== Description ==
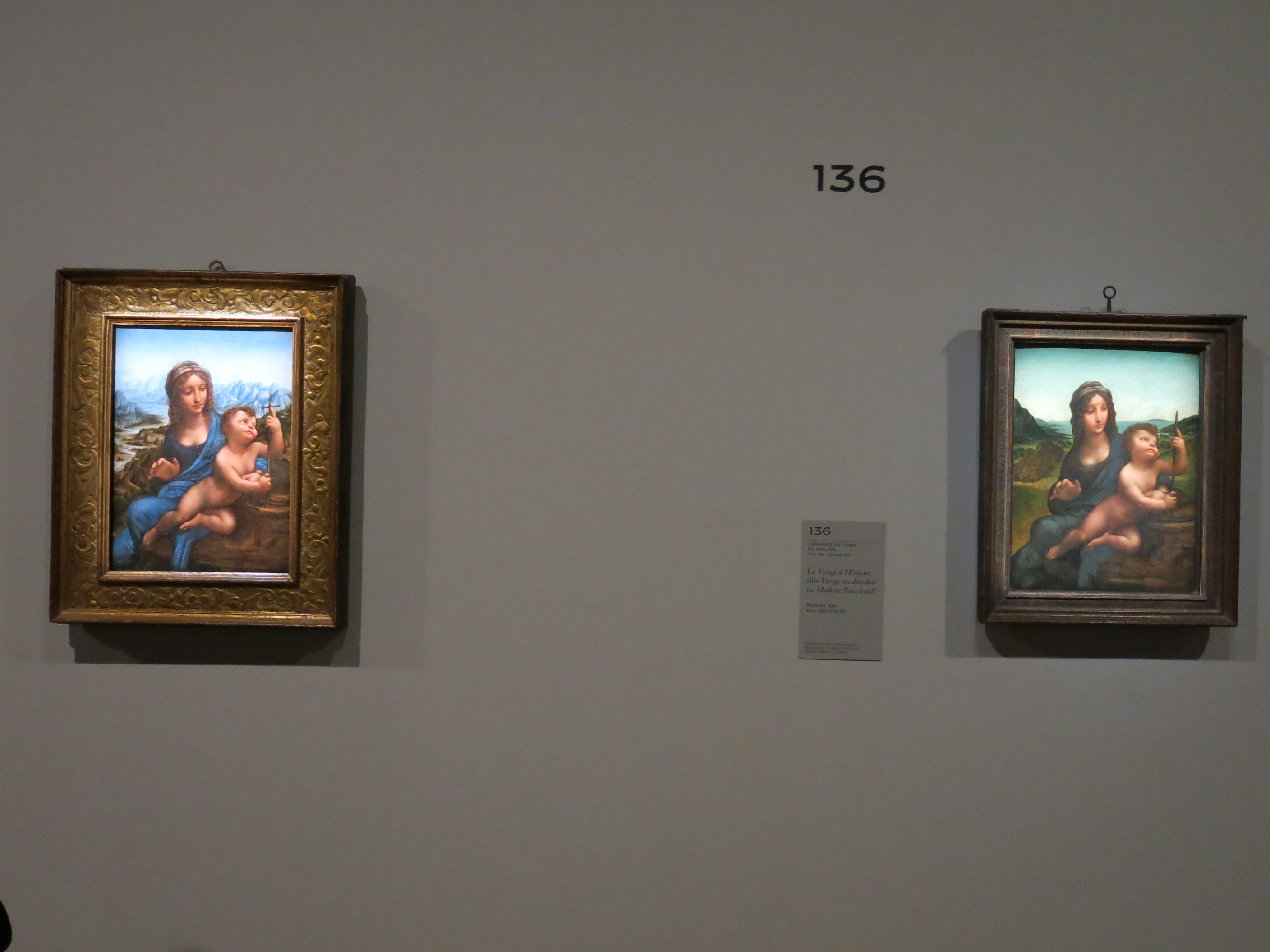
The Lansdowne Madonna (left) and the Buccleuch Madonna (right) at the monumental 2019–2020 exhibition Léonard de Vinci at the Louvre, Paris

The composition of the Madonna of the Yarnwinder shows the Christ child twisting his body away from his mother's embrace, his attention caught by her niddy-noddy whose arms (crosspieces) give it the shape of a cross. Several interpretations are generally agreed upon: that he precociously recognises it as a symbol of his destiny and that Mary's reaction is described as ambiguous, a mixture of alarm at the harm her son ultimately will come to and resigned acceptance of it. The gesture of suspense made with her right hand is repeated from Leonardo's Milanese altarpiece The Virgin of the Rocks. The use of a symbol of the Passion as an object of childish play recurs throughout Leonardo's religious paintings, appearing for instance in the Benois Madonna and the Virgin and Child with St. Anne. The depiction of Mary spinning also alludes to her antitype, Eve, who was sometimes portrayed spinning wool after her expulsion from Paradise when accompanied by her infant sons Cain and Abel. The iconography therefore is interpreted as recalling humanity's fall, its ensuing travails and its redemption through Christ's sacrifice.

As with later works by Leonardo, the figures appear in a vast unpopulated landscape. The rocky outcrop in the foreground of the Buccleuch Madonna is painted with a minute attention to geological detail. A major difference between the Buccleuch and Lansdowne Madonnas is in their background landscapes. Whereas the background of the Buccleuch version is a watery landscape indifferently painted, that of the Lansdowne Madonna has a dramatic mountain range far more typical of Leonardo. It has been proposed that this landscape in the Lansdowne painting is a specific location in the valley of the river Adda, as it runs from Lecco to Vaprio, an area familiar to Leonardo and that he mapped. It is possible that the landscape of the Buccleuch painting was added by a pupil after Leonardo failed to complete the work. For Martin Kemp what he determines as the “late” character of the landscape in the Lansdowne Madonna suggests to him that it was the later painting to be completed and that the Buccleuch Madonna was the one sent to Robertet in 1507.

The underdrawings of both the Buccleuch and Lansdowne Madonnas show several features not in the finished works, but present in some copies; it is likely that these were present during an early stage of composition development. One such feature, which appears in both underdrawings, is a group of figures interpreted as Saint Joseph making a baby walker for the Christ child, who appears with two women. Interpretations include that perhaps one is his mother and another woman, probably a midwife. It has also been suggested that the child learning to walk is the infant John the Baptist, appearing with his mother Saint Elizabeth, as Leonardo would not have been likely to depict the figures of Mary and Christ twice in the same painting. Signs of experimentation early in the design include some kind of beast of burden – a horse, ass, or ox – which appears in different positions in the two underdrawings. Behind these an architectural structure with an arched opening was planned as well. At a later stage the landscape of the Buccleuch painting seems to have had a bridge resembling that of the Lansdowne Madonna, which later was painted over.

== Buccleuch Madonna ==
A version of this painting regarded as one of the two possible primary paintings of this subject by Leonardo is now in the Scottish National Gallery in Edinburgh, on loan from Richard Scott, Duke of Buccleuch and sometimes is identified as the Buccleuch Madonna. It entered the Buccleuch collection through the marriage of Lady Elizabeth Montagu to his ancestor, Henry Scott, 3rd Duke of Buccleuch in 1767. Lady Montagu was the heiress to a substantial collection of works assembled by her parents, the Duke and Duchess of Montagu, that included this painting. The Montagus bought the Madonna of the Yarnwinder in their collection at auction in Paris in 1756, from a sale of the collection of Marie-Joseph duc d’Hostun et de Tallard, its earliest documented owner. The painting hung in Buccleuch ancestral home in Drumlanrig Castle, Dumfries and Galloway, Scotland, from 1767 until it was stolen in 2003.

=== Theft and recovery ===
In 2003, the Buccleuch Madonna was stolen from Drumlanrig Castle by two thieves posing as tourists, who said "Don't worry love; we're the police. This is just practice" to two tourists from New Zealand as they exited through a window carrying the Leonardo painting. In 2007, a chartered loss adjuster acting for the Duke of Buccleuch's insurers was contacted by an English lawyer, who claimed that he could arrange for the painting's return within 72 hours. The lawyer, Marshall Ronald of Skelmersdale, Lancashire, was visited by two undercover policemen who posed as an art expert and an agent for the Duke. The painting was then taken to a lawyer's office in Glasgow. The office was raided by police officers from four anti-crime agencies during a meeting of five people. Four arrests were made, including of two solicitors from different firms. The Scotsman, describing the Glasgow firm as "one of the country's most successful and respected law firms", quoted a source as saying their arrested member "was not involved in any criminal act, but was acting as a go-between for two parties by scrutinizing a contract which would have allowed an English firm to 'secure legal repatriation' of the painting from an unidentified party."

John Scott, 9th Duke of Buccleuch, never lived to see the recovery of the Buccleuch Madonna as he had died unexpectedly only a month beforehand. The painting was lent to the National Gallery of Scotland (now the Scottish National Gallery) in Edinburgh in 2009 by the next duke, and remains on display there as of 2026.

In 2010, Ronald was cleared of the charge of holding the duke to ransom; in 2013, he mounted legal action against the 10th Duke and the Chief Constable of Dumfries and Galloway, demanding a reward of £4.25 million, which he claims he was promised in the meeting with the undercover policemen six years earlier. In 2015, the judge, Lord Brailsford, ruled these "arrangements were no more than a scheme designed and controlled by the police in an attempt to obtain the return of the stolen property" and rejected Ronald's claim against the 10th Duke, who said "my involvement in supporting the 'sting' operation which involved an undercover police officer was entirely at the request of and under the direction of the police".

== Lansdowne Madonna ==
Madonna of the Yarnwinder (The Lansdowne Madonna)
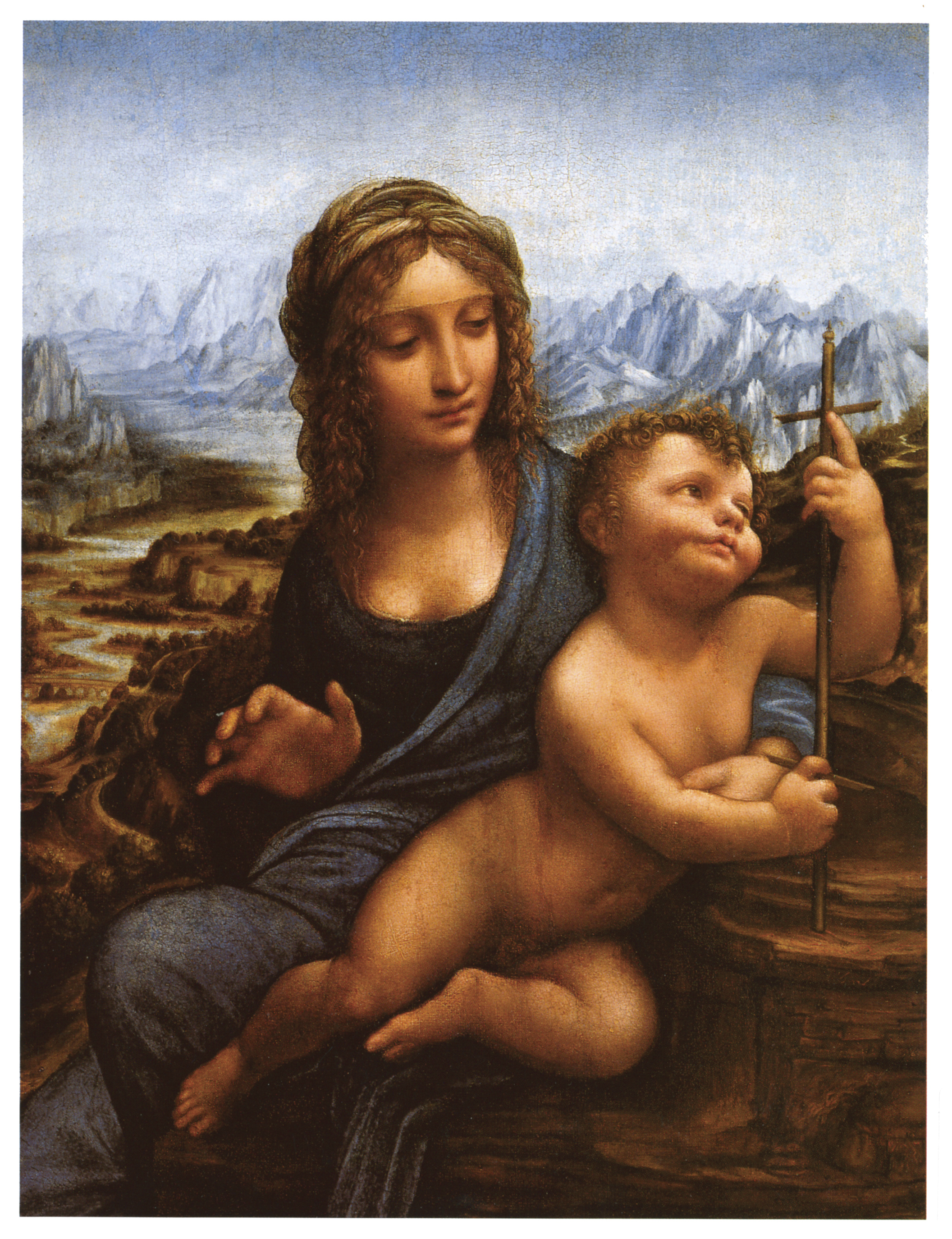
- Artists: Attributed to Leonardo da Vinci and another artist
- Type: Oil on panel (transferred to canvas and later re-laid on panel)
- Dimensions: 50.2 cm × 34.6 cm (19.8 in × 13.6 in)
- Location: Private collection, United States

Also in competition as a prime version of the Madonna of the Yarnwinder, another painting of the same subject takes its name from the Marquesses of Lansdowne, who owned it in the nineteenth century. John Petty, then Earl Wycombe and later the 2nd Marquess of Lansdowne, bought the painting some time in or before 1809, possibly from the Earl of Darnley. It is first recorded in a sale of the Dowager Marchioness of Lansdowne's collection in 1833, from which it was withdrawn. The painting remained in her family until 1879, when her daughter sold it to Cyril Flower, later Lord Battersea. In 1908, the Madonna was bought from his widow by the Paris-based art dealers Nathan Wildenstein and René Gimpel. They consulted Bernard Berenson, the leading connoisseur of the day, on the attribution in 1909; he confirmed an earlier attribution to il Sodoma, but thought that Leonardo had been responsible for the work on the painting up to the cartoon stage. The painting was created on wood panel. During restoration work around 1911, the painting was transferred to canvas and several alterations were made, most significantly the removal of a loincloth covering the Child's genitals and the fingers of Mary's left hand.

The painting was bought as a Sodoma work in 1928 by Robert Wilson Reford, a Canadian industrialist and shipping magnate. In the 1930s, it underwent X-ray and ultraviolet examination for the first time, led by a team that included the art historian William Suida. He concluded that the Christ child and the landscape were by Leonardo and the remainder was by a Milanese pupil. During a loan to the 1939 New York World's Fair the painting was damaged and further restoration work had to be undertaken. Reford's family put it up for auction in 1972, but by then the attribution had reverted to Sodoma, inevitably resulting in a lower price than if it had been accepted as a painting by Leonardo. It was bought back by Wildenstein (now as Wildenstein & Company), who arranged for the painting to be transferred a second time, this time onto a composite panel, in 1976. The Lansdowne Madonna was sold as a Leonardo to its current owner, an anonymous private collector, in 1999. The painting was on view in 2011 at the Art Institute of Chicago. In March 2026, the painting went on view at the Metropolitan Museum of Art, on loan from the collection of hedge fund billionaire Kenneth C. Griffin.

== Influence and numerous copies ==
Nearly forty versions of the Madonna of the Yarnwinder made by pupils and followers of Leonardo survive today. Many show elements that were discarded as the prime version, or versions, evolved over a long period of time. Some include the figure group in the middle ground visible in the Buccleuch and Lansdowne underdrawings; others show the basket of wool described by Fra Pietro da Novellara, although to Christ's side rather than beneath his foot. Eight paintings, including the copy in the Louvre, show a different kind of rocky outcrop in the foreground from those in the prime versions; many of these are probably by Lombard Leonardeschi. Some artists elaborated on Leonardo's composition with the addition of still lives or extra figures.

The composition of Madonna of the Yarnwinder was especially popular in Spain. The painting might have been brought to Spain by Fernando Yáñez de la Almedina or Hernando de los Llanos (whose name also appears as Fernando de Llanos). Both painters were trained in Florence in the first years of the sixteenth century. Either might be the “Ferrando spagnolo” mentioned as a pupil of Leonardo when the master was working on the fresco of the Battle of Anghiari in the Palazzo della Signoria in 1505. Many copies may have been made during that time.

=== List of copies ===
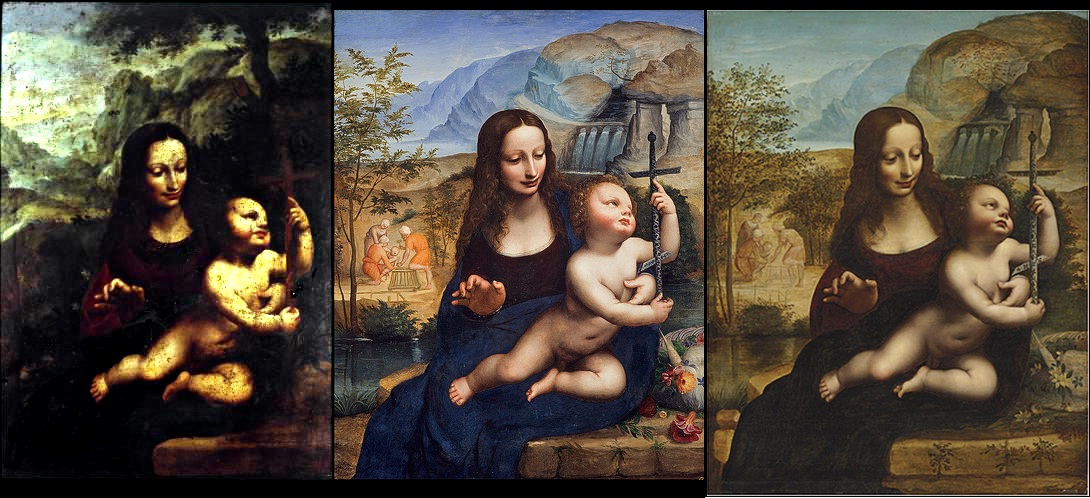
From left: Private collection, Madrid; Scottish National Gallery, Edinburgh; private collection (formerly Chicago)

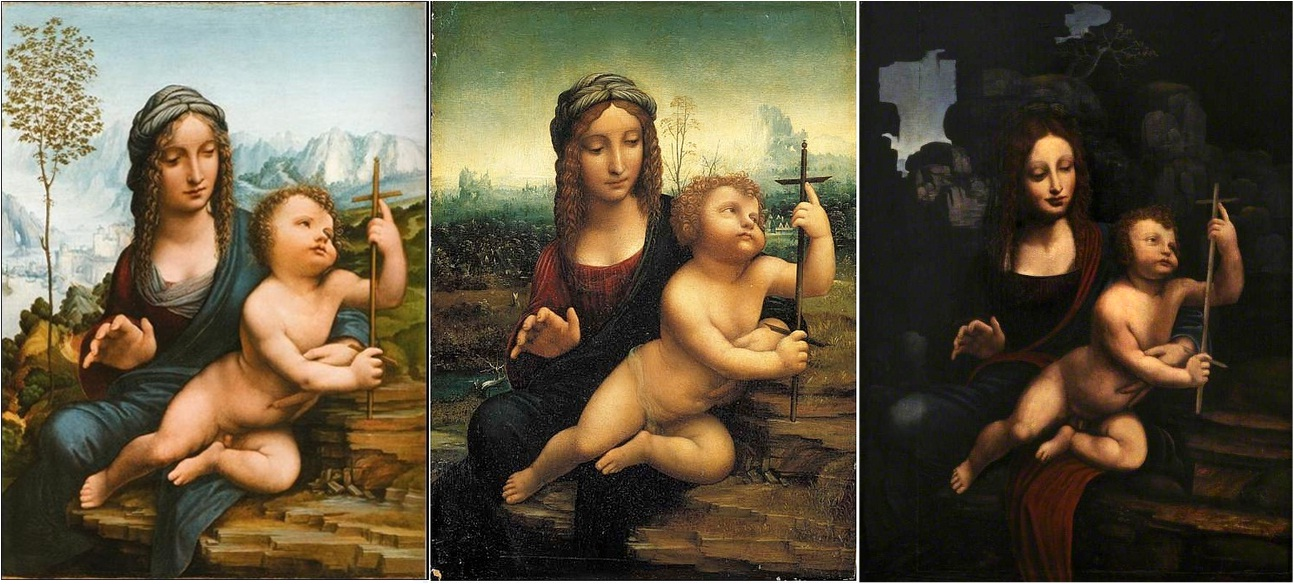
From left: Louvre, Paris, Museo Soumaya, Mexico City, Christ Church Picture Gallery, Oxford

- Madonna of the Yarnwinder (drawing after Leonardo), Uffizi, Florence
- Madonna of the Yarnwinder, Musée des Beaux-Arts de Dijon
- Madonna with the Yarnwinder, formerly Wood Prince Collection, Chicago
- Attributed to Fernando Yáñez de la Almedina, Madonna of the Yarnwinder, Scottish National Gallery, Edinburgh
- Fernando Yáñez de la Almedina, The Holy Family (1523), formerly in the Carlos Grether collection, Buenos Aires
- Attributed to Fernando Yáñez de la Almedina, Madonna of the Yarnwinder, Museo de Bellas Artes, Murcia
- Attributed to Fernando Yáñez de la Almedina, Madonna and Child with the Infant St. John (c. 1505), National Gallery of Art, Washington, D.C.
- Hernando de los Llanos, Rest on the Flight into Egypt (1507), Valencia Cathedral
- Madonna of the Yarnwinder, Worcester Art Museum, Worcester, Massachusetts
- Madonna of the Yarnwinder, Granada Cathedral
- Madonna of the Yarnwinder (c. 1510–30), Apsley House, London
- Madonna of the Yarnwinder, Museo Soumaya, Mexico City
- Madonna of the Yarnwinder, Prince's Palace of Monaco
- Madonna of the Yarnwinder, Wittelsbacher Ausgleichsfonds, Munich
- Madonna of the Yarnwinder in a Rocky Landscape, Christ Church Picture Gallery, Oxford
- Madonna of the Yarnwinder (c. 1510–20), Louvre, Paris
- Madonna of the Yarnwinder, follower of Leonardo da Vinci, circa 1500, unfinished, Private collection, Italy
- Madonna of the Yarnwinder (nineteenth century), Penrith and Eden Museum, Penrith
- Attributed to Cesare da Sesto, Madonna of the Yarnwinder, two versions in private collections
- Attributed to Cornelius van Cleve, Madonna of the Yarnwinder, private collection
- Madonna of the Yarnwinder with Cherries and an Apple, three versions in private collections
- Attributed to Martino Piazza da Lodi, Madonna of the Yarnwinder, Galleria Nazionale d'Arte Antica, Rome
- Madonna of the Yarnwinder with St. John, Tobias and the Angel and a Fruit Bowl, Museo de Bellas Artes, Córdoba
- Luis de Morales, Madonna of the Yarnwinder (1560s), Staatliche Museen zu Berlin
- Luis de Morales, Madonna of the Yarnwinder (1560s), Royal Palace of Madrid
- Luis de Morales, Madonna of the Yarnwinder (1560s), Hispanic Society of America, New York City
- Luis de Morales, Madonna of the Yarnwinder (1560s), Hermitage Museum, St. Petersburg
- Madonna of the Yarnwinder (first decade of the sixteenth century), Museo Palazzo Costa, Piacenza

== See also ==
- List of works by Leonardo da Vinci
