= Drumlanrig Castle =

Castle in Dumfries and Galloway, Scotland

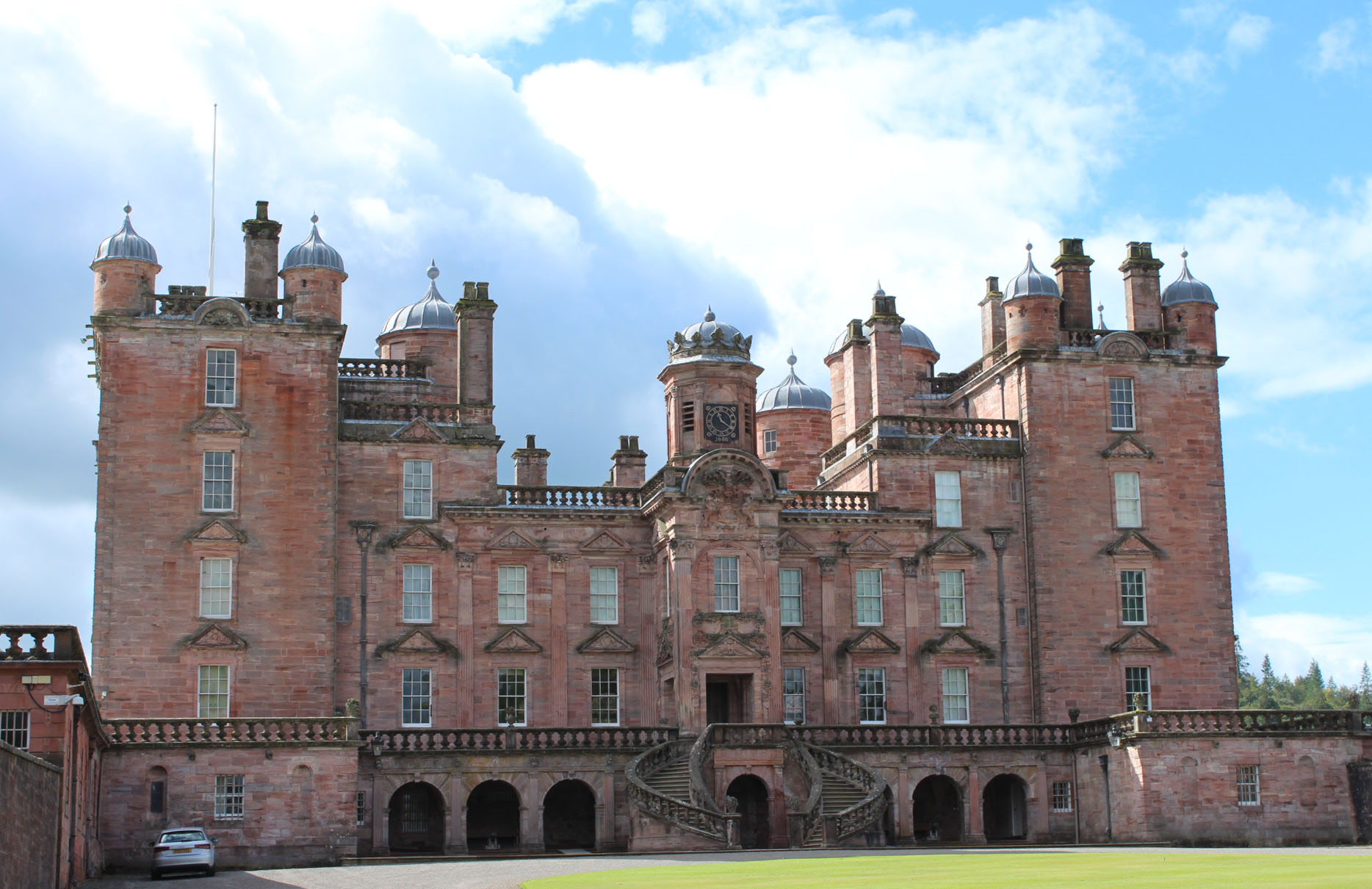
- The castle in 2016

- Location within Scotland
- Established: 14th century
- Location: Thornhill, Dumfries and Galloway, Scotland, United Kingdom
- Coordinates: 55.274°N 3.810°W
- Owners: Dukes of Buccleuch and Queensberry
- Website: drumlanrigcastle.co.uk

Designations

Inventory of Gardens and Designed Landscapes in Scotland
- Official name: Drumlanrig Castle
- Designated: 30 June 1987
- Reference no.: GDL00143

Drumlanrig Castle is situated on the Queensberry Estate in Dumfries and Galloway, Scotland. The category A listed castle is the Dumfriesshire home of the Duke of Buccleuch and Queensberry. As of September 2023, the castle itself is open to the public during very limited times of the year, with the surroundings, such as the stableyard and adventure playground being open nearly all year round. Walking, hiking, and cycling routes are open all year long, unless officially closed due to unforeseen circumstances, such as in 2021 due to damage inflicted by Storm Arwen.

== Construction ==
The 'Pink Palace' of Drumlanrig, constructed between 1679 and 1689 from distinctive pink sandstone, is an example of late 17th-century Renaissance architecture. The first Duke of Queensberry, William Douglas, had the castle built on the site of an ancient Douglas stronghold overlooking the Nith Valley. The castle has 120 rooms, 17 turrets and four towers.

In 1984, aerial photography revealed the outline of a substantial Roman fort some 350 yards (320 m) to the southeast of Drumlanrig Castle. The fort was partially excavated in 2004 by the Time Team television programme.

== Gardens ==
A formal garden was created between 1675 and 1697 to the principles of the architect Sir William Bruce and appear to be similar to the garden plans for Kinross House and Balcaskie. The gardens were enclosed by stone walls and included six stone pavilions each with lead ogee roofs matching the main building. Water features in the garden included a "clanging clock". In 1695 when the second duke inherited the estate he employed a James Wood son of Hew Wood of Hamilton as a gardener, and sent him to London in 1696 for further training. He failed to return and the duke instead employed a Dutch gardener named Cornelius van Nerven. In 1698 a summer house and water cascades were added. The third duke employed a David Low as gardener from 1714 to 1747. This period had the creation of more landscape features plus a bowling green (an early example of such). During this period Sir John Clerk of Penicuik designed the water cascades which were added 1728 to 1732.

Following the death of David Low, the head gardener, in 1747, the number of gardeners was reduced to eight to ten men, and the new head gardener was paid less than Low. The gardens were allowed to be less maintained and by 1810 there was a decision made to remove the formal gardens.

== Art collection ==
The castle is home to part of the Buccleuch art collection which includes Rembrandt's An Old Woman Reading, and Leonardo da Vinci's Madonna of the Yarnwinder, which was stolen in 2003 and returned in 2007 after being found in Glasgow, and many other paintings, tapestries and objects of art. The Madonna of the Yarnwinder is currently on loan at the Scottish National Gallery.

== Surrounding attractions ==
The castle features attractions for both tourists and local residents, situated in the former stable yard, and in an off-section of the rear gardens. These include the Stableyard Studios with a range of local businesses, a tearoom and an adventure playground.

== Etymology ==
The earliest record for Drumlanrig is from 1374, spelled Drumlangryg. There are a number of possible etymologies for the name. It may represent Cumbric drum 'ridge' + -lanerc 'small area of cleared woodland'. However, the first element may also be Gaelic druim 'ridge', either added to a Cumbric name or to Scots *lang-rigg 'long ridge'.

== Gallery ==
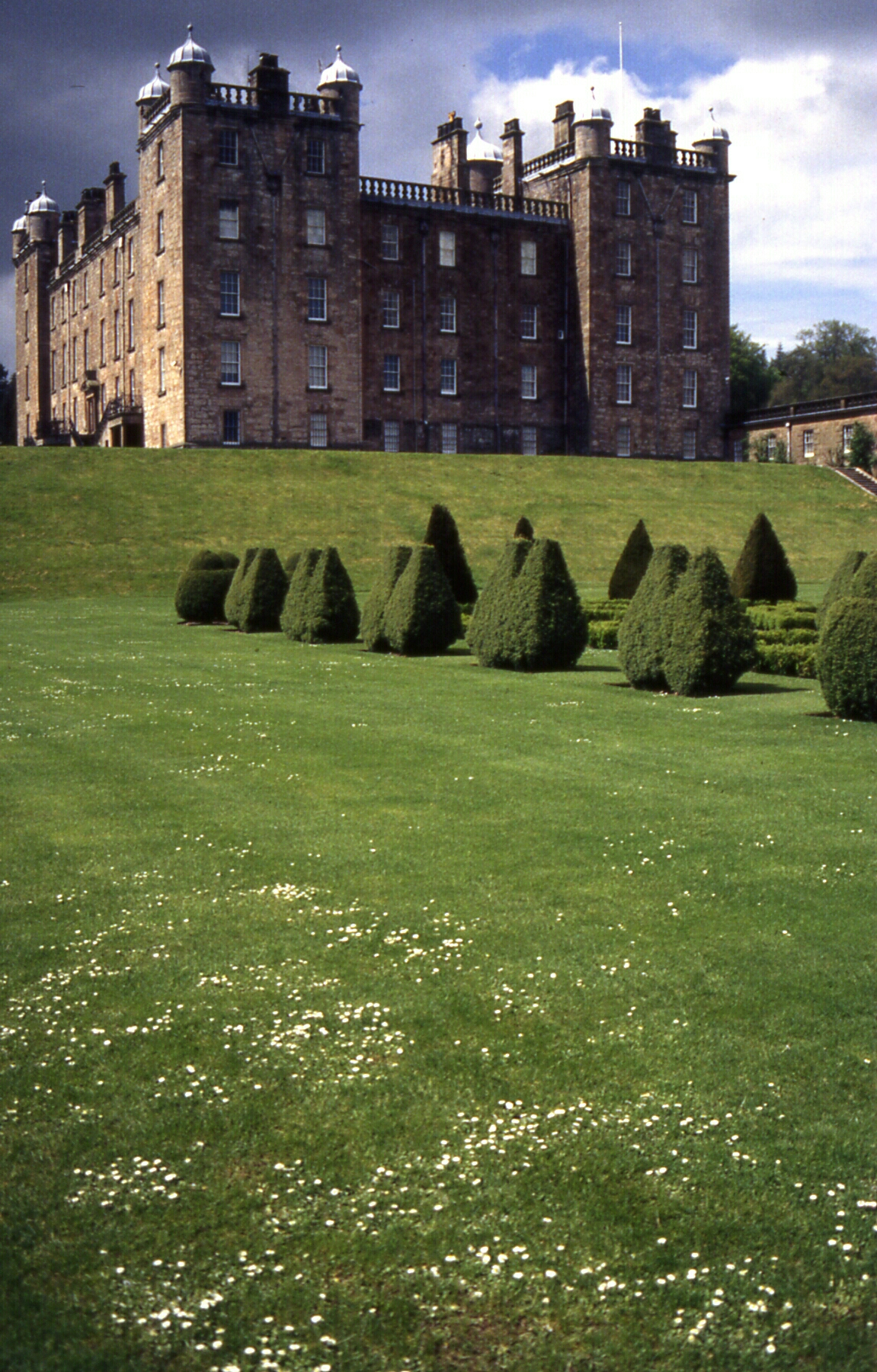
Drumlanrig Castle side on view looking at the right-hand side

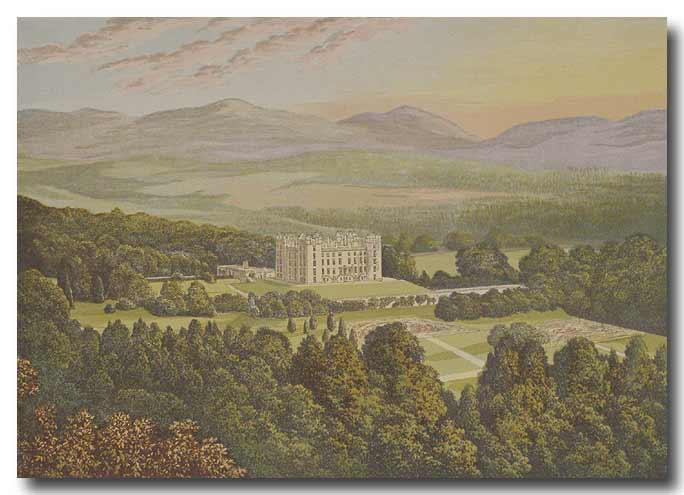
Drumlanrig Castle illustration in 1880

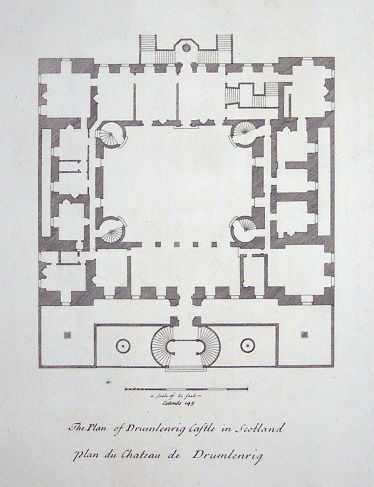
Original plan. The building extends 145 ft (44m)

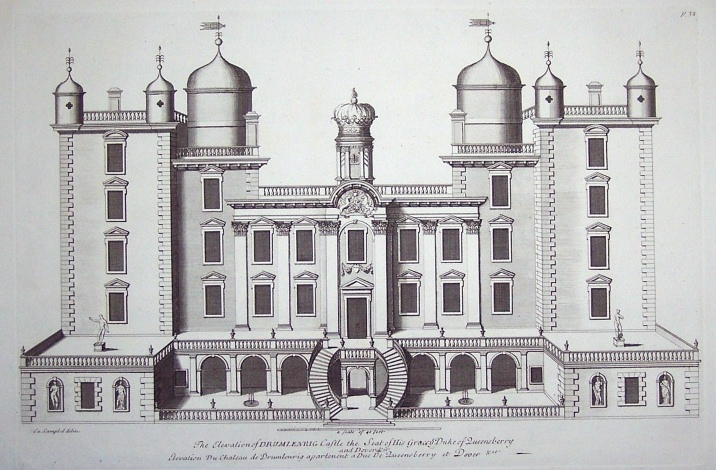
Planned front entrance illustration

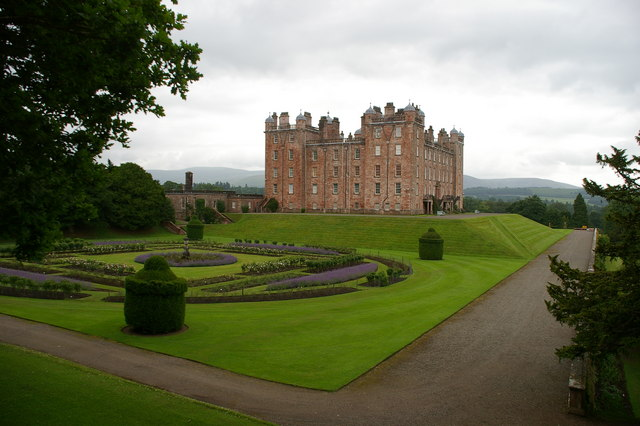
Drumlanrig Castle side on view looking at the left-hand side

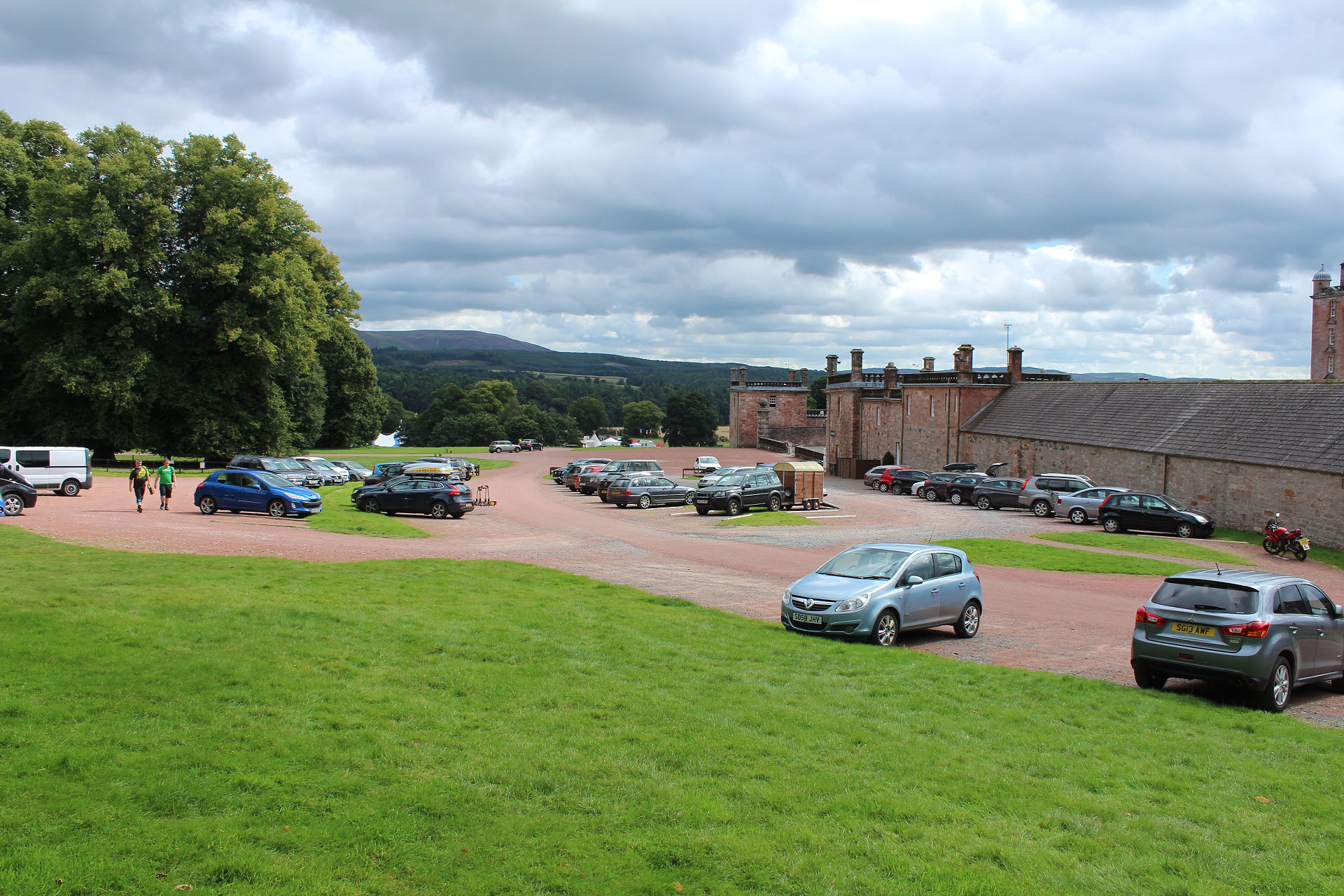
Main/Front car park, looking down from Stableyard towards front gate to Castle itself, as well as road towards Adventure Playground

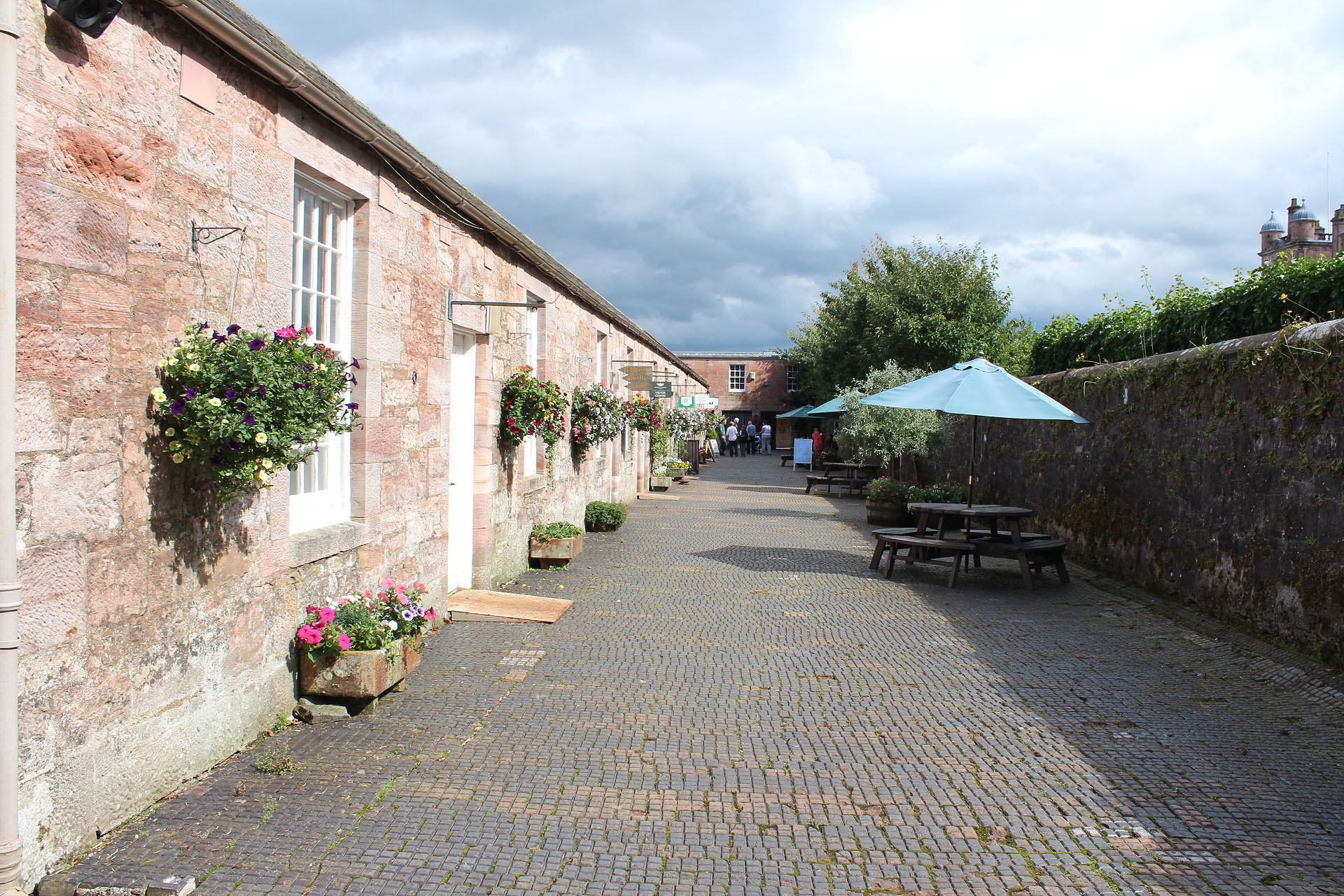
View inside the Stableyard, towards the rear, facing an exit as well as the general direction of the Castle

== See also ==
- Tibbers Castle – a 12th-century motte-and-bailey in the Drumlanrig Castle estate
- Treasure Houses of Britain – 1985 TV series that covers the house in some detail
