= James Agar =

James Agar is the name of:

- James Agar, 1st Viscount Clifden (1735–1788), Irish peer and politician
- James Agar, 3rd Earl of Normanton (1818–1896), British Conservative Party politician
- James Agar (1672–1733), Irish politician
- James Agar (1713–1769), Irish politician
- James Agar (priest) (1781–1866), Anglican priest in Ireland
