= William Agar =

English cricketer

William Talbot Agar (15 February 1814 – 12 June 1906) was an English cricketer with amateur status. He was born at Camden Town, London and played for Cambridge University and Marylebone Cricket Club (MCC) and made his debut in 1835. He was educated at Harrow School and Trinity College, Cambridge.

== Bibliography ==
- Haygarth, Arthur (1996) [1862]. Scores & Biographies, Volume 1 (1744–1826). Kennington: Frederick Lillywhite. ISBN 978-19-00592-23-9.
- Haygarth, Arthur (1997) [1862]. Scores & Biographies, Volume 2 (1827–1840). Kennington: Frederick Lillywhite. ISBN 978-19-00592-23-9.
