= James Agar (priest) =

James Agar was a 19th-century Anglican priest in Ireland.

The son of Charles Agar, 1st Earl of Normanton, Archbishop of Dublin from 1801 until 1809, he was educated at Westminster School and Christ Church, Oxford. He was Archdeacon of Kilmore from 1810 to 1866
