= Charles Agar (cricketer) =

English cricketer

Cricket information
- Batting: Right-handed
- Bowling: Right-arm medium

Career statistics
Competition	First-class
Matches	23
Runs scored	381
Batting average	11.20
100s/50s	0/0
Top score	48
Balls bowled	2,911
Wickets	38
Bowling average	45.02
5 wickets in innings	0
10 wickets in match	0
Best bowling	4/80
Catches/stumpings	14/–
- Source: CricketArchive, 6 December 2022

Charles Agar (20 May 1877 – 10 November 1921) was an English first-class cricketer. He was a right-handed batsman and a right-arm medium-pace bowler who played for Leicestershire. He was born in Rothley and died in Southfields, Leicester.

== Career ==
Agar made his debut during the 1898 County Championship season, making a debut innings of 26 before being bowled out by Foster Cunliffe. Thanks in part to this performance he was kept within the team and played on a regular basis throughout the 1898 season, scoring his best bowling figures of 4–80 during his debut season, though he scored a pair in the final match against Warwickshire.

Though Leicestershire finished joint-bottom of the County Championship table, faith was kept in Agar for the following season, though he would maintain his position in the lower order, playing more games during 1899 than in any other season. He also found himself bowling more during this season than any other, and taking his best season average of just over 40. Leicestershire started the season badly and ended in joint thirteenth place in the table.

1900 was Agar's final season in the side, in which he would make it up from the tailend into the position of a more credible lower-order batsman, finishing not out on a couple of occasions from around seventh in the batting order. In Agar's final game, a draw against Surrey, he scored just three runs, while being very expensive with the ball, with figures in the first innings of 0–105.
