= Jacques d'Agar =

French portrait painter

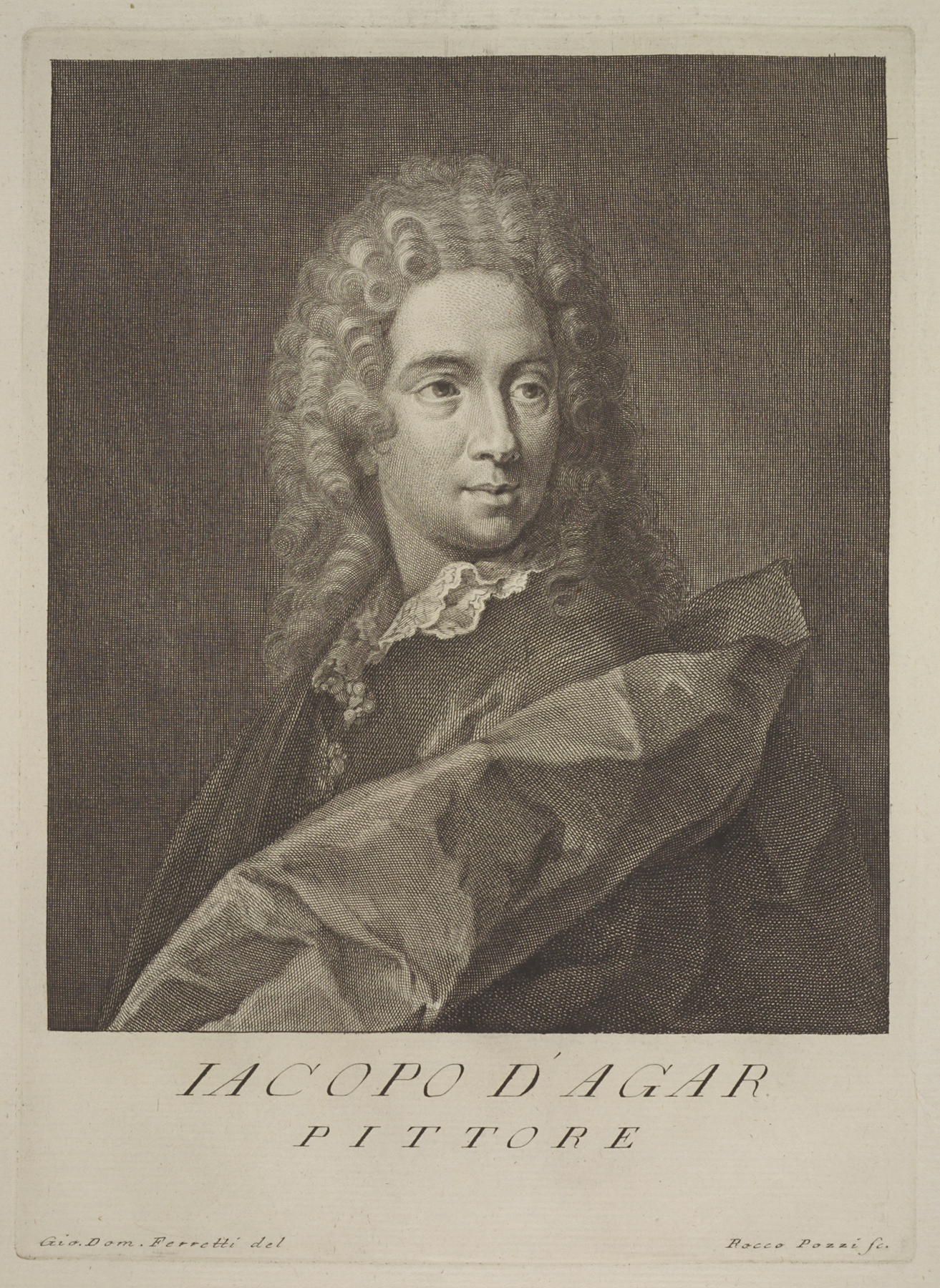
- Portrait de Jacques d'Agar, eau-forte de Rocco Pozzi.
- Born: Paris
- Died: 16 November 1715; Copenhagen
- Occupation: Painter
- Children: Charles d'Agar

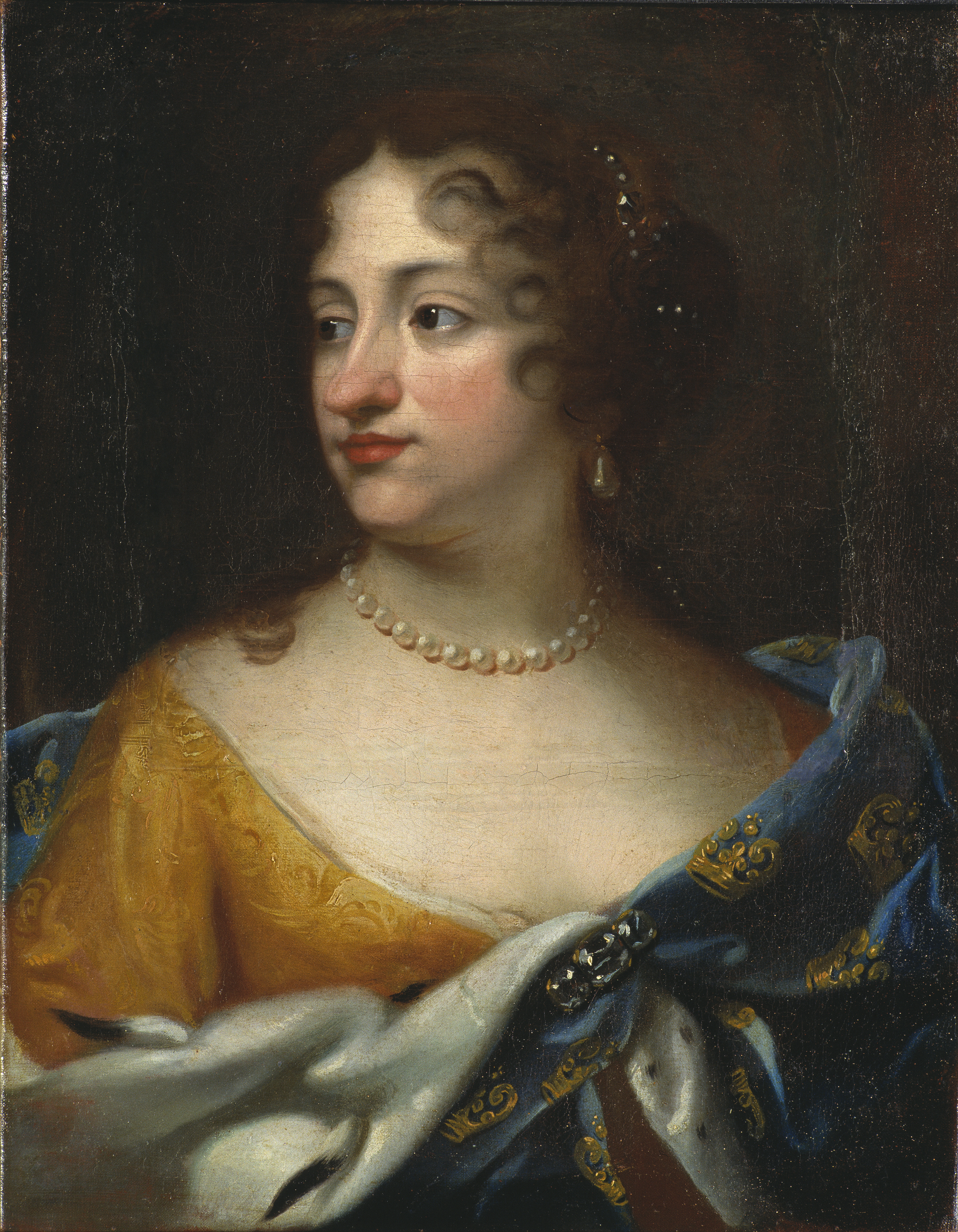
Ulrika Eleonora of Denmark, painting by d'Agar, about 1690

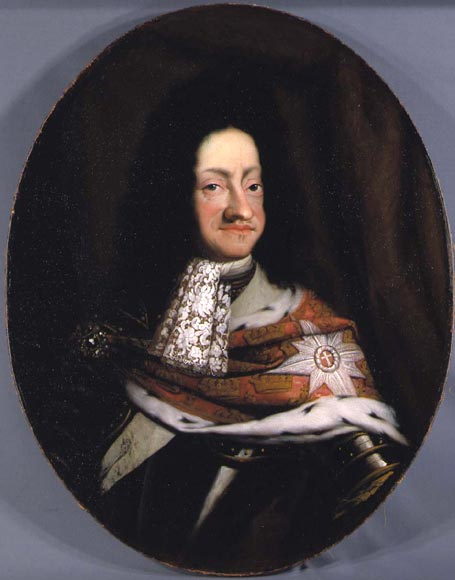
Christian V of Denmark, painting by d'Agar

Jacques d'Agar (Danish: Jacob d'Agar; 9 March 1640 – 16 November 1715) was a French portrait painter born in Paris. He was a pupil of Jacob Ferdinand Voet. He began his career as a history painter, but soon abandoned it for portraiture, a branch of art in which he became very successful.

In 1675, d'Agar was admitted into the Academy and also became painter-in-ordinary to the king and his court. Upon the revocation of the Edict of Nantes in 1682, d'Agar, as a Protestant, was shut out from the Academy. He accordingly left France, never to return.

D'Agar was invited to the court of Denmark, and was greatly patronized by King Christian V. His self-portrait is in the Galleria degli Uffizi in Florence, having been painted for Cosimo III de' Medici in 1693, at the request of King Christian. Horace Walpole stated that d'Agar visited England, where he resided for some time, and met with success. He painted the portraits of several members of the British nobility during Queen Anne's reign, including the Duchess of Montagu, the Countesses of Rochfort and Sunderland, Thomas Wentworth, 1st Earl of Strafford, and others. A portrait of Charles II, by him, is said to have been formerly in the Gallery at Christiansborg Palace.

He died in 1716 in Copenhagen. His son Charles d'Agar also became a portrait painter.
