= Bernice Agar =

Australian photographer (1885–1976)

- Born: 1885; Bowen, Queensland, Australia
- Died: 1976 (aged 91); Sydney, New South Wales, Australia
- Occupation: Photographer
- Years active: c1917 - 1933

Bernice Agar (9 April 1885 – 1976) was a leading Australian portrait, fashion and society photographer in the late 1910s until the 1930s.

== Early life and education ==
Bernice Isabel Agar was born on 9 April 1885 in Bowen, Queensland, to Isabella (née Henderson) and Alexander William Agar.

She began her career training as a photographer at the Bain Photographic studios in Toowoomba, Queensland.

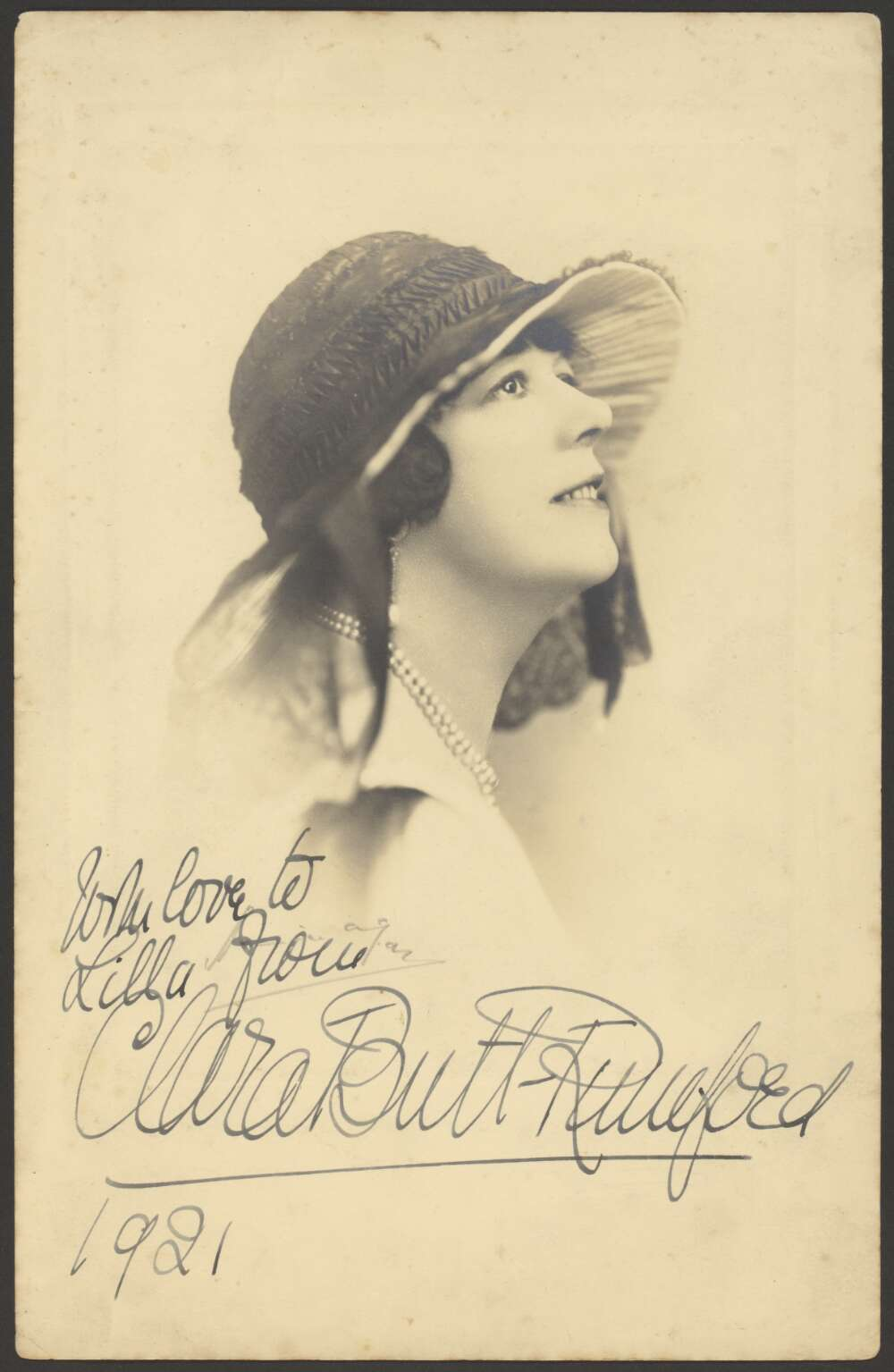
Portrait of Clara Butt by Bernice Agar (1921)

== Career ==
By 1917 Agar was already established as a prominent photographer. The Darling Downs Gazette covered an exhibition that was held of her work at the Bain Studios in Brisbane, and said, "It is doubtful if in Australia there is anything to come up to Miss Agar's work".

In 1918 Agar established the Bernice Agar Studio in Sydney. Her portrait work was featured in leading magazines and newspapers of the period such as The Home Magazine, The Australian Women's Weekly, and The Sun. She photographed prominent women of the time, including Australian artist Thea Proctor and British opera singer Clara Butt.

Anita Callaway writes that her style was characterised by "strong, dramatic cross lighting and theatrical, almost unnatural, poses". Barbara Hall and Jenni Mather note her "celebration of the two-dimensional with [a] strong use of frontal lighting. The image is perceived as an arrangement of shapes: a hat may be chosen for its geometrical line, the body framed for effect and the who image subtly etched with shadow".

After her marriage to James W. Hardie, an accountant, she wound up her business on 5 February 1934. Jack Cato said "the leading camera men of this country breathed a sigh of relief" when she stopped her career.

She died in Sydney, Australia, in 1976.
