= Charles d'Agar =

French painter

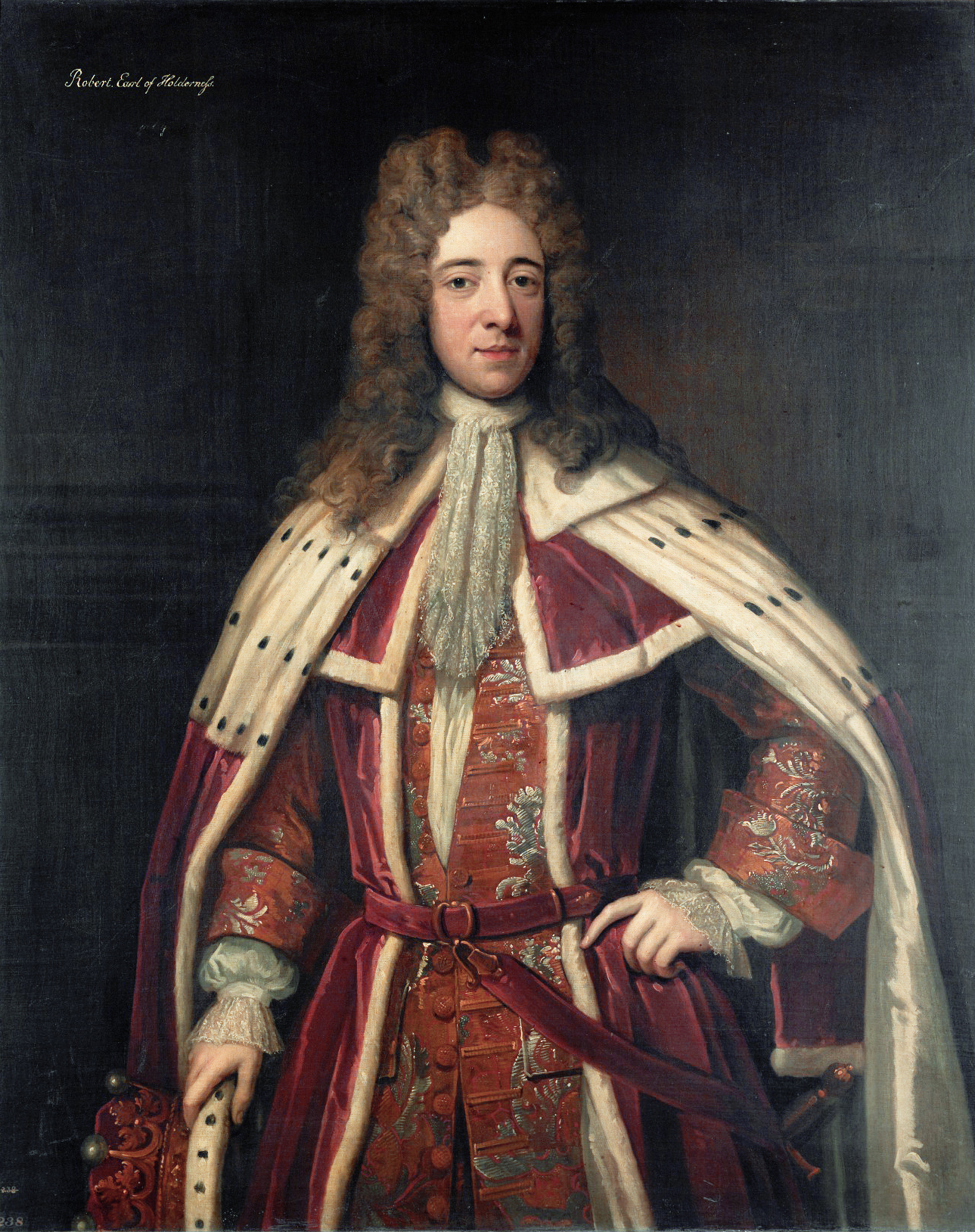
Robert Darcy, 3rd Earl of Holderness, before 1721, oil on canvas, 125.1 by 101 cm, private collection

Charles d'Agar (Note: The spelling d'Agar is commonly present in bibliography including reference books. Although, variant spellings are also known in 17th-century and 18th-century sources, such as Dagar, de Garr, and others.) (1669–1723) was a French portrait painter, the son of Jacques d'Agar. Active in England for much of his life, he is most known for portraits made during the Late Stuart and Early Georgian eras.

D'Agar came to England with his father in 1681. He primarily painted portraits on commission for patrons such as the Duke of Buccleuch and Lord Bolingbroke. Some of his works can be found at Nunnington Hall.
