= Arthur Boscawen =

British horticulturalist (1862–1939)

Reverend Canon Arthur Townshend Boscawen (9 July 1862 – 17 July 1939) was a British Rector of Ludgvan in Cornwall, England, and a recreational and commercial horticulturalist who introduced the anemone as a commercial crop to Cornwall.

== Family ==
Arthur Townshend Boscawen was born in Hanover Square, London, the ninth of twelve children of the Rev Hon John Townshend Boscawen (1820–1889) and Mary Tremayne (died 25 November 1895), the daughter of John Hearle Tremayne MP for Cornwall and owner of the Heligan estate, near Mevagissey. His father was the Rector of Lamorran, a keen gardener of (it was said) one of the finest gardens in Cornwall. His uncle was Evelyn Boscawen, 6th Viscount Falmouth who was developing the garden on his estate at Tregothnan.

Boscawen married at St Andrew's Church, Plymouth, on 2 September 1902, Christian Anna E Chapell-Hodge (1866– 13 November 1940), eldest daughter of Mr and Mrs Chapell-Hodge of Plymouth. They had two daughters:

1. Violet Mary Boscawen (12 June 1903 – 7 January 1998)
2. Karenza Margaret Boscawen (11 November 1904 – 22 April 1977) – a cultivar of the daffodil, 'Karenza' was named for her.

== Career ==
He initially considered the army for a career but opted for the church, and following a short period working in the Diocese of Bristol he was based at Buckland Monachorum, Devon for five years before moving to Ludgvan in 1893. In 1917 Boscawen had the rank of Temporary Chaplain to the Forces, of the 1st Battalion, Cornwall Volunteers Regiment.

In 1933, he was appointed canon of Truro Cathedral and was also a Justice of the Peace.

=== Gardening ===
The garden of the Rectory, in Ludgvan, was first laid out by William Borlase when he was the rector in 1722. He planned to grow exotic species sent to him by his uncle who was a captain in the service of the East India Company in Bengal, India. Boscawen had similar plans and was sent trees and shrubs from New Zealand. Material for the garden was provided by some of New Zealand's botanists, including Thomas Cheeseman, and by his eldest brother, John Hugh Boscawen who was employed by the New Zealand Forest Service. There was also a network between local gardens and gardeners with the transfer of plants and seeds. These included Arthur Dorrien-Smith's garden at Tresco, Morrab Gardens and Penlee Park in Penzance and Eagles Nest, Zennor. Little of the original garden survives, the three winters of 1938, 1939 and 1940 were severe and many of the more tender trees and shrubs were killed, although some of the planting remains including the palms (Trachycarpus fortunei), the tallest measuring 10 metres (33 ft) tall. Boscawen did not leave a list of his plantings but research by Anne Boscawen shows that there were 290 acquisitions of plants. Boscawen also introduced many new plants to the botanical garden at Tregothnan.

== Horticulture ==
Boscawen spent much of his time on the propagation of shrubs from cuttings and seeds. In 1912 he was awarded a Gold Medal and The Gardeners' Chronicle Cup for New Plants for varieties of New Zealand manukas' (Leptospermum scoparium var Nichollsii). A variety of daffodil was named, ″Karenza (Cornish for love) was named after his second daughter and a second variety was named ″Ludgvan″. Both varieties appear to be no longer available. It is thought that Boscawen collected seeds of Anemome while on holiday in the Mediterranean and in 1925 gave 2 ounces (57 g) of white, woolly seeds to the nearby Gulval Experimental Station. The first commercial crop was despatched to Covent Garden which filled a gap in the farming year between cauliflower and narcissi. Cauliflower is known as broccoli in Cornwall and he helped local production by introducing seed from Bavaria, to improve the local varieties.

He was awarded the Victoria Medal of Honour in 1922 by the Royal Horticultural Society.

== Death ==
Boscawen died 17 July 1939 at the Rectory and is buried at the Church of St Paul, Ludgvan. There is a monument to him inside the church.
