= John Tremayne =

John Tremayne may refer to:

- John Tremayne (fl. 1388), MP for Truro (UK Parliament constituency) in 1388
- John Tremayne (1647–1694), English lawyer and politician, Serjeant-at-Law and King's Serjeant, MP for Tregony
- John Hearle Tremayne (1780–1851), Cornish MP and High Sheriff of Cornwall in 1831
- John Tremayne (1825–1901), MP for constituencies in both Cornwall and Devon, and High Sheriff of Cornwall in 1859
- John Claude Lewis Tremayne (1869–1949), last squire of Heligan and better known as "Jack", see Lost Gardens of Heligan
- John Tremayne Babington (1891–1979), later John Tremayne Tremayne, British Air Marshal and High Sheriff of Cornwall in 1954
- John Tremayne (died 1504), of Tremayne & Collacombe, High Sheriff of Cornwall in 1485 & 1487
- John Tremayne (of Heligan), High Sheriff of Cornwall in 1745
