= St. Ewe =

St. Ewe could refer to:

- Saint Avoye, known in English-speaking nations as Saint Ewe, an early 3rd century saint in the Roman Catholic church.
- St Ewe, a village in Cornwall, England, which is named after the aforementioned Saint Avoye's English moniker.
