= John Tremayne (1647–1694) =

English lawyer and politician

Sir John Tremayne

Personal details
- Born: 1647 Mevagissey, Cornwall, England
- Died: 1694 (aged 46–47)
- Resting place: Temple Church, London
- Party: Whig
- Occupation: Lawyer, politician

Sir John Tremayne SL (1647–1694) was an English lawyer and politician. He became a Serjeant-at-Law and King's Serjeant in 1689, acting as counsel during a number of cases before the House of Lords. He also represented Tregony in Parliament between 1690 and 1694.

== Early and family life ==
Tremayne was baptised in Mevagissey, Cornwall, on 16 September 1647, the first son of Colonel Lewis Tremayne (1619–1685) and Mary (1625–1701), daughter and co-heiress of John Carew of Penwarne. In 1680 he married Frances (baptised 1655, died 1683), daughter of William Davie of Sandford, Devon. They had one son, John, who died young in about 1692.

He succeeded his father to the Heligan estate in 1685, where in 1692 he rebuilt the house using Heligan bricks in William and Mary style.

His death is recorded by Narcissus Luttrell on 20 February 1694, but the exact date is unknown. On 23 February, he was buried in the Temple Church, London. The estate passed to his younger brother Charles (1650–1695), ancestor of Henry Hawkins Tremayne (1741–1829), who initiated the creation of the gardens now known as the Lost Gardens of Heligan.

== Career ==
After studying law, he was called to the bar in 1673, after entering the Inner Temple in 1666 and transferring to the Middle Temple in 1669. In May 1689 he was called with others to be Serjeant-at-Law, and was made a King's Serjeant, representing the Crown in court. His name frequently occurs in cases before the House of Lords from 1689 to 1693; he was counsel for the Crown against Richard Graham, 1st Viscount Preston and others for high treason in January 1691, was engaged for Sir John Germaine in the action brought against him by Henry Howard, 7th Duke of Norfolk for adultery with Mary, Duchess of Norfolk, and he acted for the crown on the trial of Charles Mohun, 4th Baron Mohun for the murder of actor William Mountfort in January 1693.

He was knighted on 31 October 1689, and in 1690 was returned as Member of Parliament for the Cornish borough of Tregony. In June 1692 he was a candidate for the Recorder of London, but was beaten at the poll.

Pleas of the Crown in Matters Criminal and Civil was published in 1723 after being "digested and revised" by John Rice of Furnival's Inn. An English translation by Thomas Vickers was published in Dublin in 1793.

== Footnotes ==
Parliament of England
| Preceded by Robert Harley; Hugh Fortescue | Member of Parliament for Tregony; 1690–1694; With: Hugh Fortescue | Succeeded by The Earl of Kildare; Hugh Fortescue |
