= Henry Hawkins Tremayne =

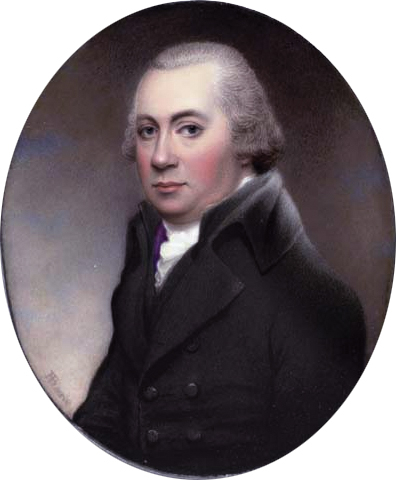
Henry Hawkins Tremayne (1766–1829) (Henry Bone)

The Reverend Henry Hawkins Tremayne (1741–1829) was a member of a landed family in the English county of Cornwall, and owner of the Heligan estate near Mevagissey, with significant interests in the Cornish tin mining industry. He is credited as initiating the creation of the set of gardens around Heligan House that are now well known as the Lost Gardens of Heligan.

== Life ==
Henry Hawkins Tremayne was born in 1741, the second son of John Tremayne and Grace Hawkins. He was baptised at St Ewe on 17 July 1741, and was educated at Blundell's School in Tiverton. He attended Balliol College of the University of Oxford, where he matriculated in May 1759 and graduated as a Bachelor of Arts in 1763. Like many second sons of landed families, he was destined for a career in the Church of England, where he was ordained as a deacon in 1766. He took up the post of curate at Lostwithiel.

Henry's older brother Lewis died shortly after Henry's ordination, leaving Henry the unexpected role of heir to the Heligan estate. In 1767, he married Harriet, the daughter of John Hearle of Penryn, a former vice-warden of the stannaries. As a consequence, he inherited a third share of the extensive Hearle estates and mining industry. In 1808 a further inheritance brought him the Tremayne estates at Sydenham in Devon.

Henry was active in local politics although, unlike his son and grandsons, he never became a member of Parliament. He was a Tory and was elected mayor of Penryn on several occasions. In 1791 he chaired a protest meeting of those involved in the pilchard fisheries. He was locally renowned for his charity: 'his numerous tenantry knew him as their kindest and best friend' (West Briton, 20 Feb. 1829).

Henry died at Heligan on 10 February 1829. His eldest son, John Hearle Tremayne, inherited an estate of more than 10,000 acres (4,000 ha) in Devon and Cornwall, including Heligan.

== Heligan ==
Henry aspired to create a great garden at Heligan. He started by planting protective shelter belts of conifers on the western and eastern boundaries of his planned extensive gardens. In 1785, he undertook a tour of southern England, visiting many of the significant gardens of the time, including those of Blenheim, Park Place, Stowe and Hestercombe. He removed the earlier parterres, and laid out the northern gardens, building walled gardens, greenhouses, and a pineapple pit.

Two estate plans, dating, respectively, from 1777 and sometime before 1810, show the changes wrought to the Heligan estate during Henry's ownership. The first plan shows a predominantly parkland estate, with the site of today's Northern Gardens occupied by a field. The second plan shows the development of shelter belts of trees surrounding the gardens, and the main shape of the Northern Gardens, the Mellon Yard and the Flower Garden are all readily discernable.
