= Harriet Jane Trelawny =

English author (1821-1879)

Harriet Jane Trelawny (1821–1879) was a British writer and member of the British landed gentry. She published the novel Sister in 1879.

== Life ==
Trelawny was born Harriet Jane Tremayne in London in 1821. Her father was John Hearle Tremayne of Cornwall and she was the oldest of her siblings. In 1842, Trelawny married Sir John Salsbury Trelawny, with whom she had one daughter.

Trelawny wrote one novel, which was published shortly before her death in 1879. The work was titled Sister and was published in two volumes by Smith, Elder & Co.
