= St Ewe =

Coordinates: 50.280°N 4.839°W

St Ewe: Cornish: Lannewa
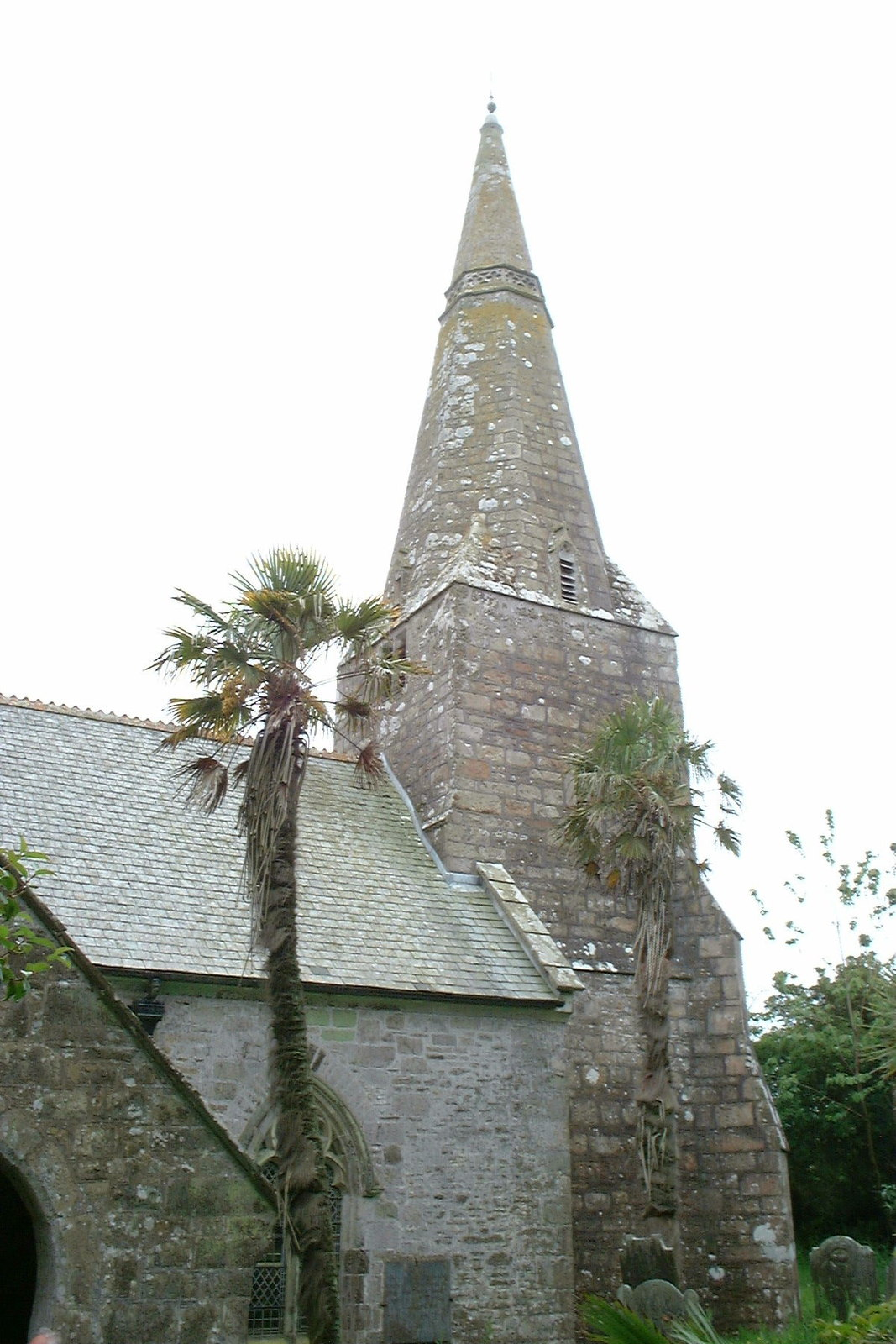
- All Saints' Church

- Location within Cornwall
- Population: 568 (2011 census)
- OS grid reference: SW978461
- Civil parish: St Ewe
- Unitary authority: Cornwall
- Ceremonial county: Cornwall
- Region: South West
- Country: England
- Sovereign state: United Kingdom
- Post town: ST AUSTELL
- Postcode district: PL26
- Dialling code: 01726
- Police: Devon and Cornwall
- Fire: Cornwall
- Ambulance: South Western
- UK Parliament: St Austell and Newquay

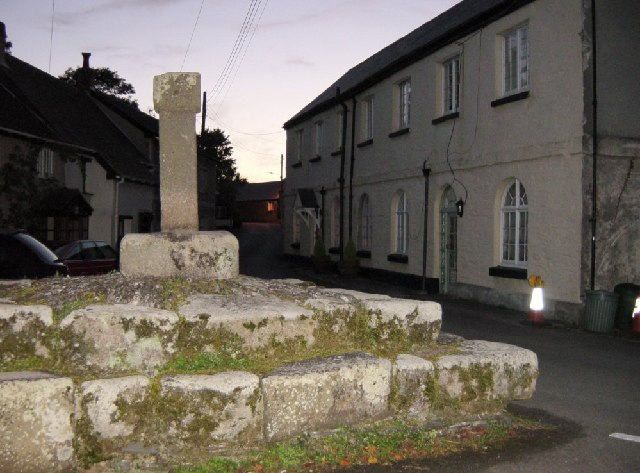
St Ewe Cross

St Ewe (Cornish: Lannewa) is a civil parish and village in mid-Cornwall, England, United Kingdom, which may be named after an Englished version of Saint Avoye. The village is situated approximately five miles (8 km) southwest of St Austell.

== Antiquities ==
Evidence of early medieval habitation is in the form of a roadside Celtic cross that once stood near Nunnery Hill (Charles Henderson in 1925 refers to it being at Lanhadron). However, the crosshead and shaft were thrown down in 1873 by a farmer looking for buried treasure, and both pieces were afterwards lost. The base has survived in situ with an inscription in insular script, unreadable except for the word crucem; Elisabeth Okasha dates the construction of this monument between the ninth and eleventh centuries.

There is another cross at Corran, about half a mile east of the churchtown. This cross is also known as Beacon Cross since its site is known as the Beacon. There is a cross at Heligan known as Bokiddick Cross; it came from Bokiddick Farm in the parish of Lanivet which was then owned by the Tremaynes who also owned Heligan. The cross in the churchtown stands on a massive base which is the only original part of it. The stones forming the cross came from elsewhere and nothing is known about the design of the original cross.

== Churches ==
The parish church is dedicated to St Ewe, a female saint of whom very little is known; it has been argued that she is the same as Saint Avoye of Sicily, although traditions about the latter's life vary in content. The church was originally a Norman cruciform building: the tower and spire were added in the 14th century and the south aisle in the 15th. There is a Norman font and a fine 15th-century rood screen. The small manor of Lanewa was for a long time linked to the advowson of the church; it was probably the secular successor to a Celtic monastery.

At Tucoyse was a Wesleyan Methodist chapel, and there were formerly Bible Christian chapels at Polmassick, Paramore, Kestle and Lower Sticker.

== Heligan ==
The Heligan estate is located at the eastern edge of the parish of St Ewe, overlooking the small port of Mevagissey. The long-term home of the Tremayne family, the estate is now best known as the location of the Lost Gardens of Heligan, a recently restored Victorian garden.

== Notable people ==
- Henry Hawkins Tremayne (1741–1829), landed family member, created the gardens around Heligan House, now named the Lost Gardens of Heligan
- Thomas Luny (1759–1837), an English painter who specialised in marine art.
- Arthur Tremayne (1827–1905), a Crimean War soldier and Cornish MP for Truro, 1878 to 1880.
- Lionel Martin (1878–1945), businessman who co-founded the company that became Aston Martin

== Language ==
St Ewe was surveyed for the Survey of English Dialects.
