= John Hearle Tremayne =

John Hearle Tremayne (17 March 1780 – 27 August 1851) was a member of a landed family in the English county of Cornwall, and owner of the Heligan estate near Mevagissey. He was a member of the UK Parliament for the constituency of Cornwall, a Justice of the peace, and High Sheriff of Cornwall in 1831. He was also the second of four successive members of the Tremayne family who are credited with the creation of the gardens around Heligan House that are now well known as the Lost Gardens of Heligan.

== Life ==
John Hearle Tremayne was born on 17 March 1780, the son of Rev. Henry Hawkins Tremayne (1741–1829) and Harriet, his wife, the daughter of John Hearle of Penryn.

In 1818, John Hearle Tremayne married Caroline Matilda Lemon, the daughter of Sir William Lemon MP, and the sister of Sir Charles Lemon, the other County MP but of the Whig persuasion.

Their children were:

- Harriet Jane Tremayne (1821–1879) married Sir John Salusbury Salusbury-Trelawny in 1842.
- Caroline (died young)
- Henry William died 9 March 1823, following a painful illness.
- John (15 April 1825 – 1901) was an MP and further developed the gardens at the Heligan estate. He married the Hon. Mary Charlotte Vivian, daughter of Lord Vivian of Glynn.
- Arthur Tremayne (1827–1905), inherited most of Sir Charles Lemon's wealth, his mother's brother.
- Henry Hawkins Tremayne (24 March 1830 – 1894) married Charlotte Jane, 3rd daughter of John Buller
- Mary Tremayne married Reverend John Townshend Boscawen, son of Rev. Hon. John Evelyn Boscawen and Catherine Elizabeth Annesley, on 13 February 1851. She died on 25 November 1895.

== Heligan ==
John Hearle Tremayne inherited the Heligan estate from his father in 1829. He was responsible for the ornamental plantings along the estate's Long Drive, and for the starting the planting of the Jungle.

== Politics and other offices ==
John Hearle Tremayne was elected as a Member of Parliament (MP) for the Cornwall parliamentary constituency on 12 November 1806 and was re-elected in elections held in 1807, 1812, 1818 and 1820. He represented the constituency until 1826, sitting on the Conservative Party benches. In 1808, he was responsible for the introduction to parliament of Grylls' Act, more formally known as the Burial of Drowned Persons Act 1808, which provides for the decent interment of bodies washed ashore in consecrated ground and was a consequence of the loss of the Royal Navy frigate HMS Anson in Mount's Bay in the previous year.

In addition to his parliamentary service, John Tremayne was a Justice of the peace and, in 1831, High Sheriff of Cornwall.

== Records ==
The records of the Tremayne family are held by the Cornwall Record Office.

Parliament of the United Kingdom
Preceded by Sir William Lemon, Bt; Francis Gregor	Member of Parliament for Cornwall; 1806–1826; With: Sir William Lemon, Bt 1806–1825; Sir Richard Vyvyan, Bt 1825–1826	Succeeded by Sir Richard Vyvyan, Bt; Edward William Wynne Pendarves
