= Heligan estate =

Country house in Cornwall, England

Coordinates: 50°17′N 4°48′W

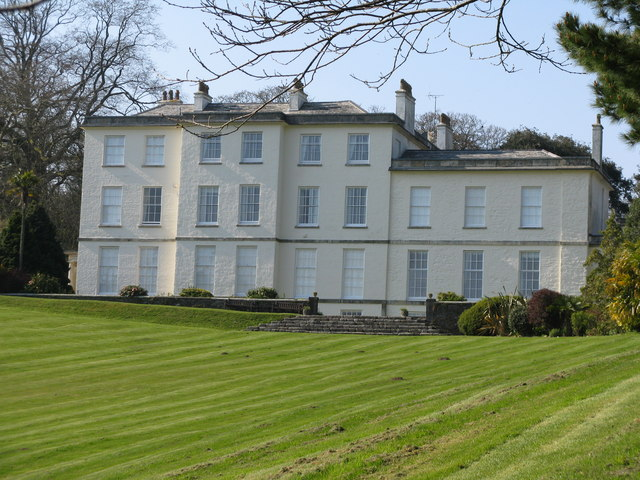
Heligan House

The Heligan estate (/hɛˈlɪɡən/; Cornish: Helygen, meaning willow tree) was the ancestral home of the Tremayne family near Mevagissey in Cornwall, England. Purchased by Sampson Tremayne in 1569, the present house was built in 1692 and extended in the early 19th century. The family left the house after World War I, and by the end of World War II the house and gardens had fallen into disrepair. The house and outbuilding were converted into flats in the 1970s and the garden was considered lost, but it was rescued during a televised project in 1996. The Lost Gardens of Heligan are now open to the public as a tourist attraction.

== Heligan House ==
Originally owned by the Heligans, the estate was bought by Sampson Tremayne in 1569. Heligan House was built by William Tremayne in 1603 in Jacobean style, but only the basement of that house remains. The house was substantially rebuilt in 1692 by Sir John Tremayne (1647–1694) in William and Mary style and extended in 1810 and 1830. Unusually for Cornwall, the house is built of brick. Set at the top of a hill overlooking Mevagissey, the gardens are found along the hills above and below the house.

The Tremayne family remained at the house until World War I, at which point the house was let out. The tenants were unable to keep up maintenance of the estate and by the end of World War II, maintenance of the house and gardens slipped into decline. The house was divided into flats and sold in the 1970s, with the remaining buildings also being converted into accommodation.

== Gardens ==
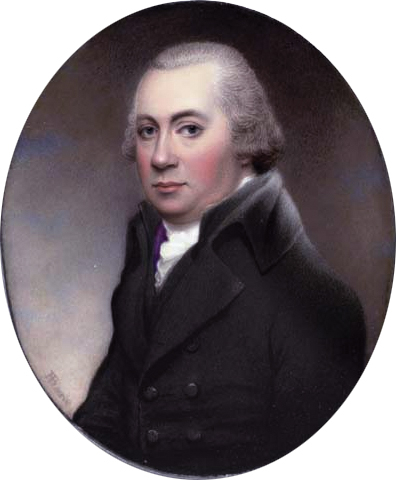
Rev. Henry Hawkins Tremayne; by Henry Bone

The garden remained in the ownership of the Tremayne family, but was not maintained. It was rediscovered and rescued in a televised project in 1996. The Lost Gardens of Heligan are now a major visitor attraction.

Originally developed by Rev. Henry Hawkins Tremayne the gardens include enormous rhododendrons and camellias as well as a series of lakes fed by ram pump. They include Europe's only remaining pineapple pit, and two large sculptures known as the Mud Maid and Giant's Head.
