= Lost Gardens of Heligan =

Botanical garden in Cornwall, England

- Lowarth Helygen
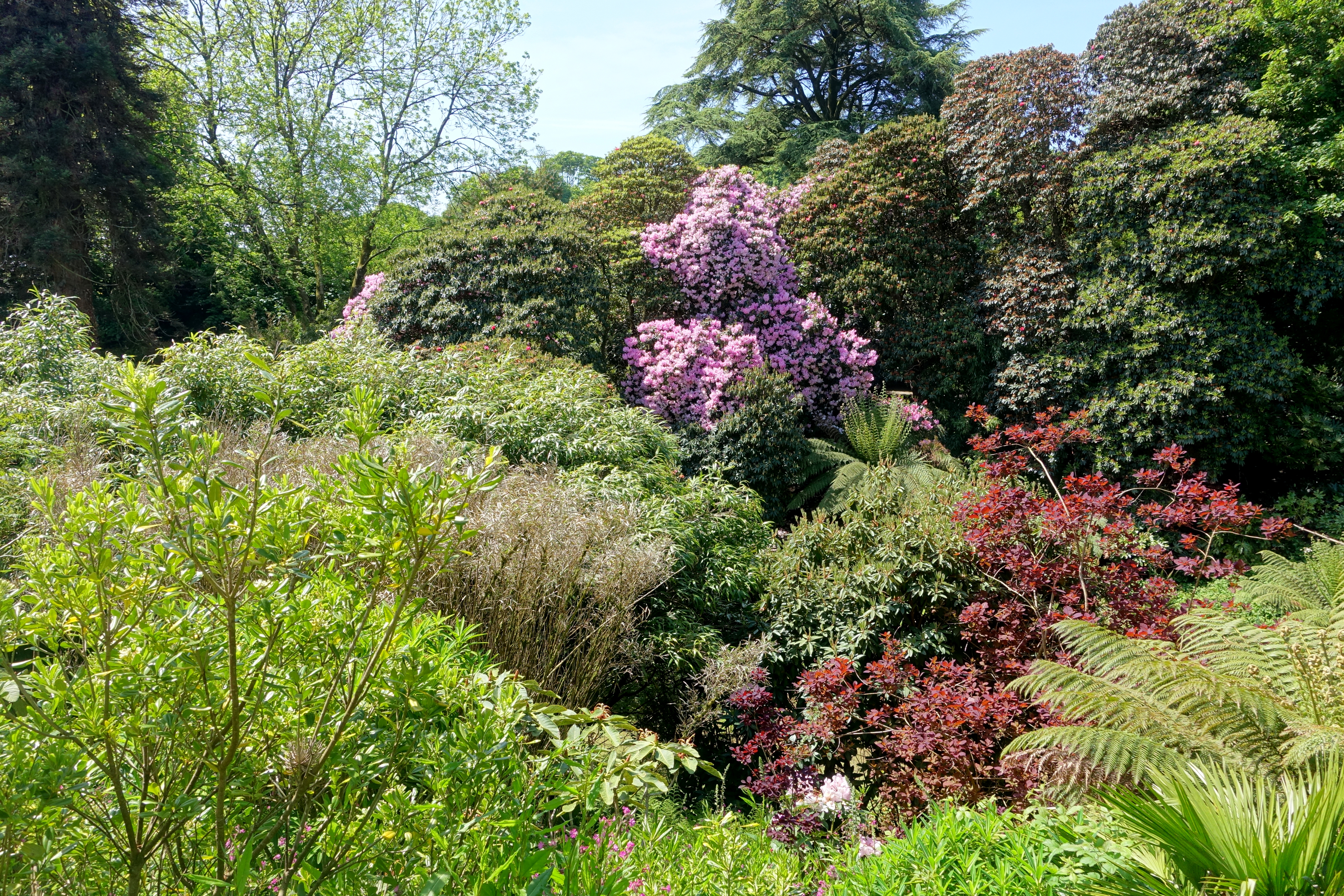
- Interactive map of Lost Gardens of Heligan
- Location: St Austell, Cornwall
- Coordinates: 50.285747°N 4.811583°W
- Opened: 1992
- Website: www.heligan.com

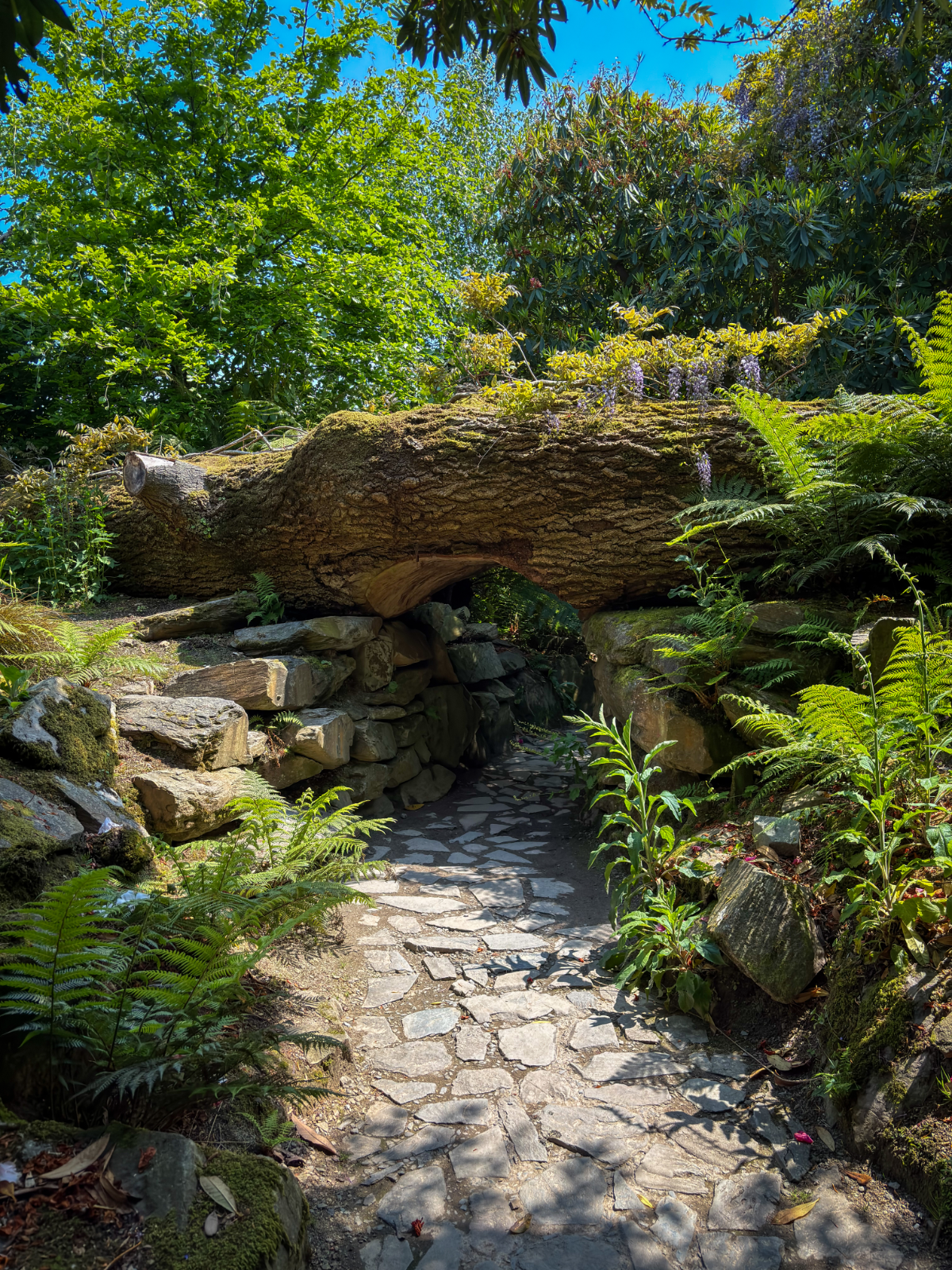
The Woodland Garden

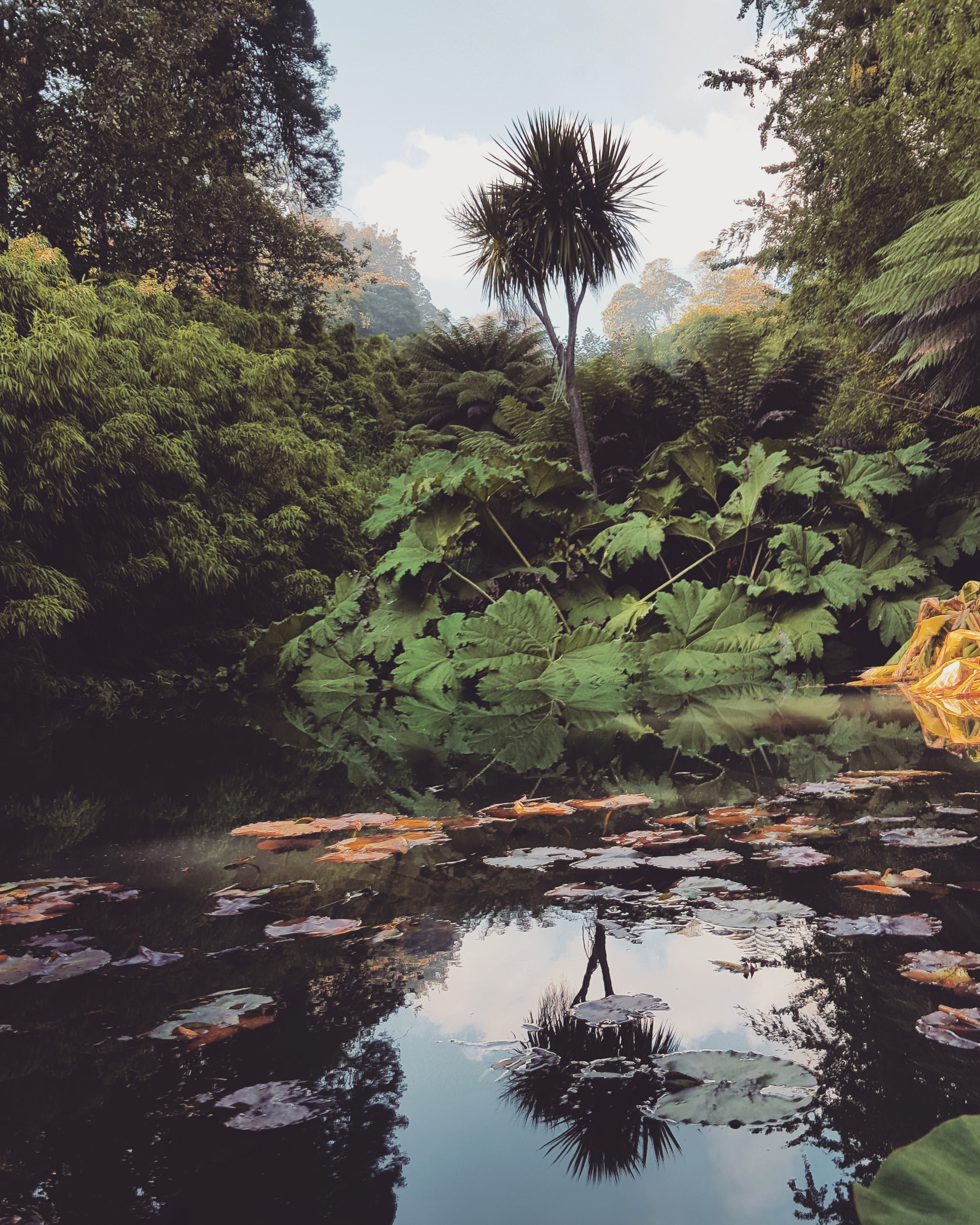
The Jungle

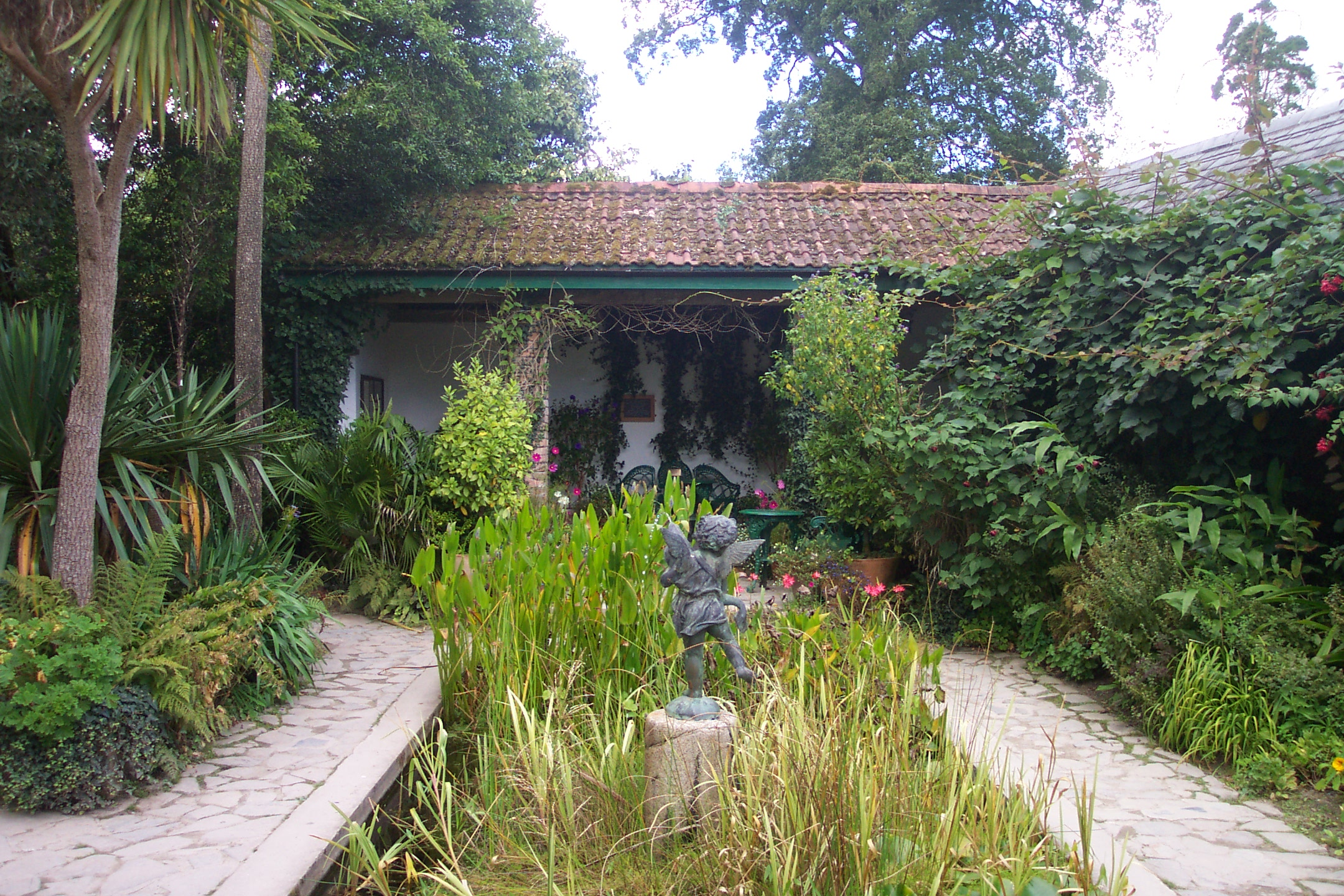
The Italian Garden

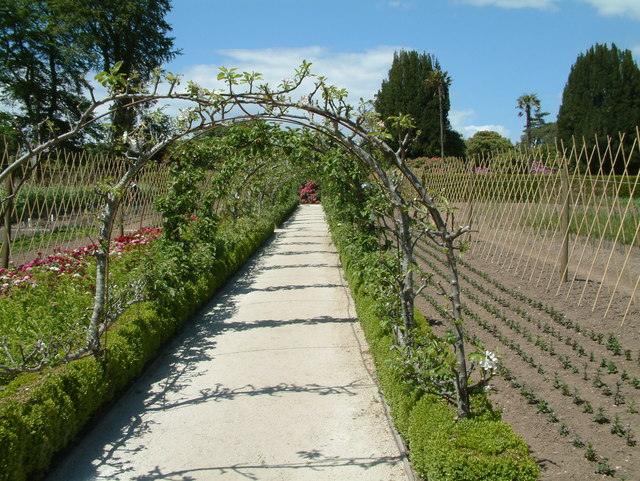
Vegetable Garden apple arches

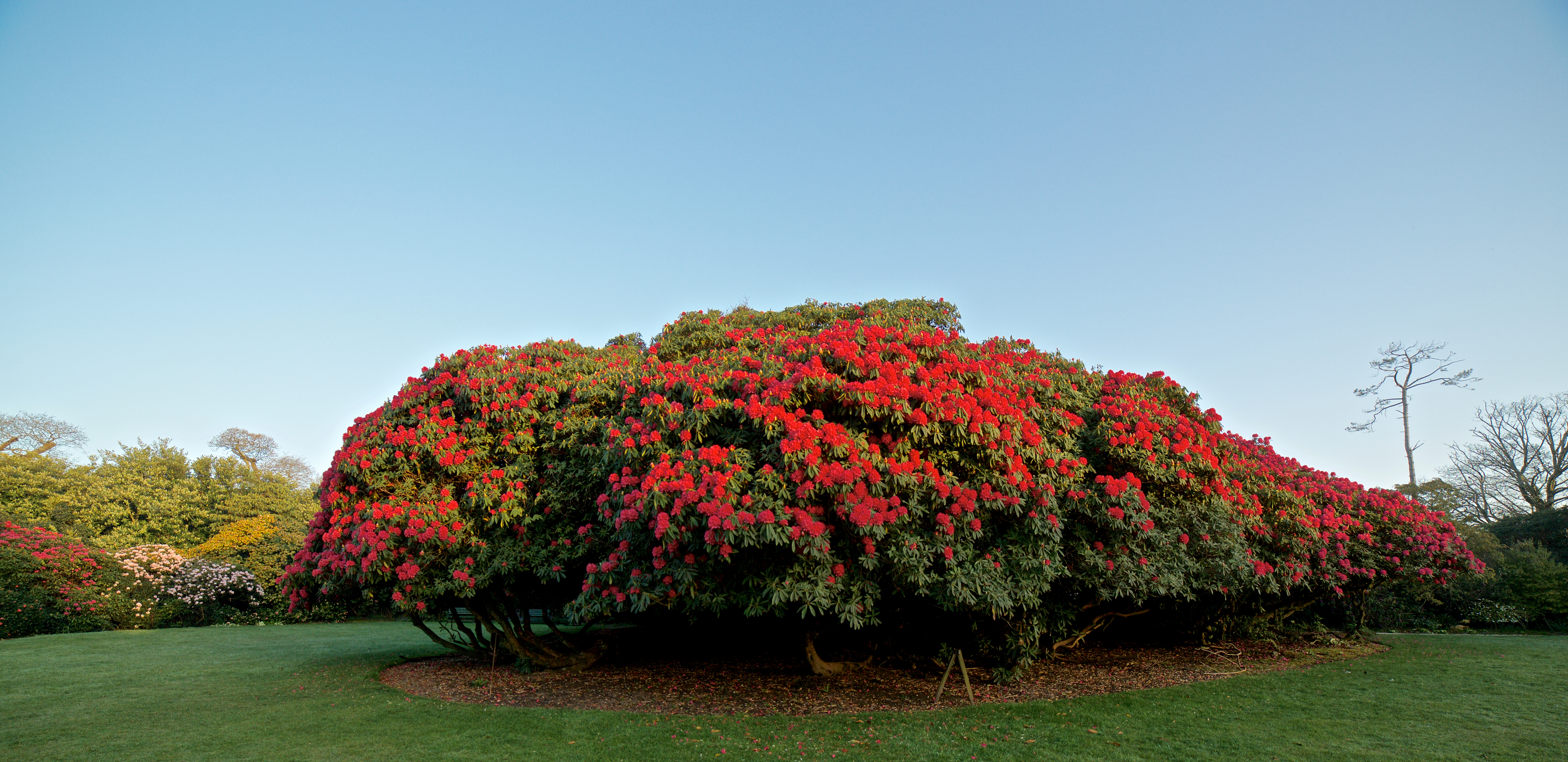
Flora's Green rhododendrons

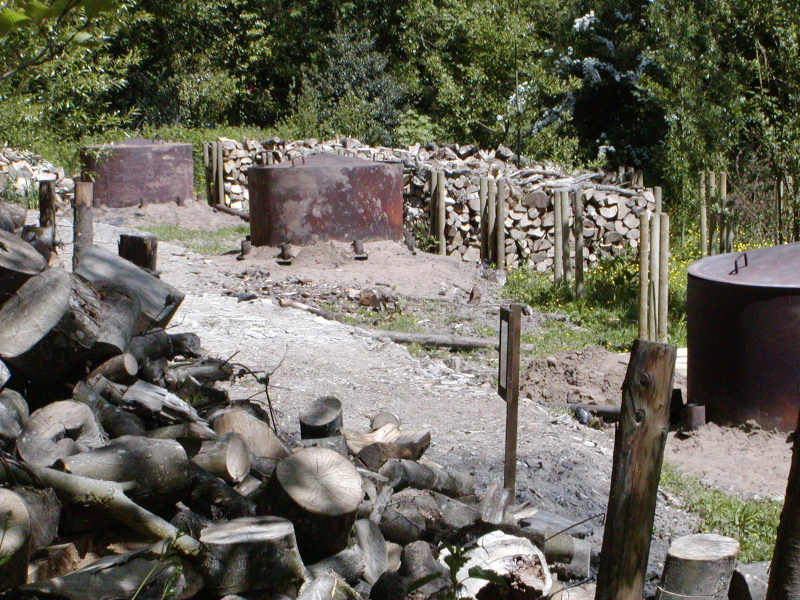
Charcoal kiln in the Lost Valley

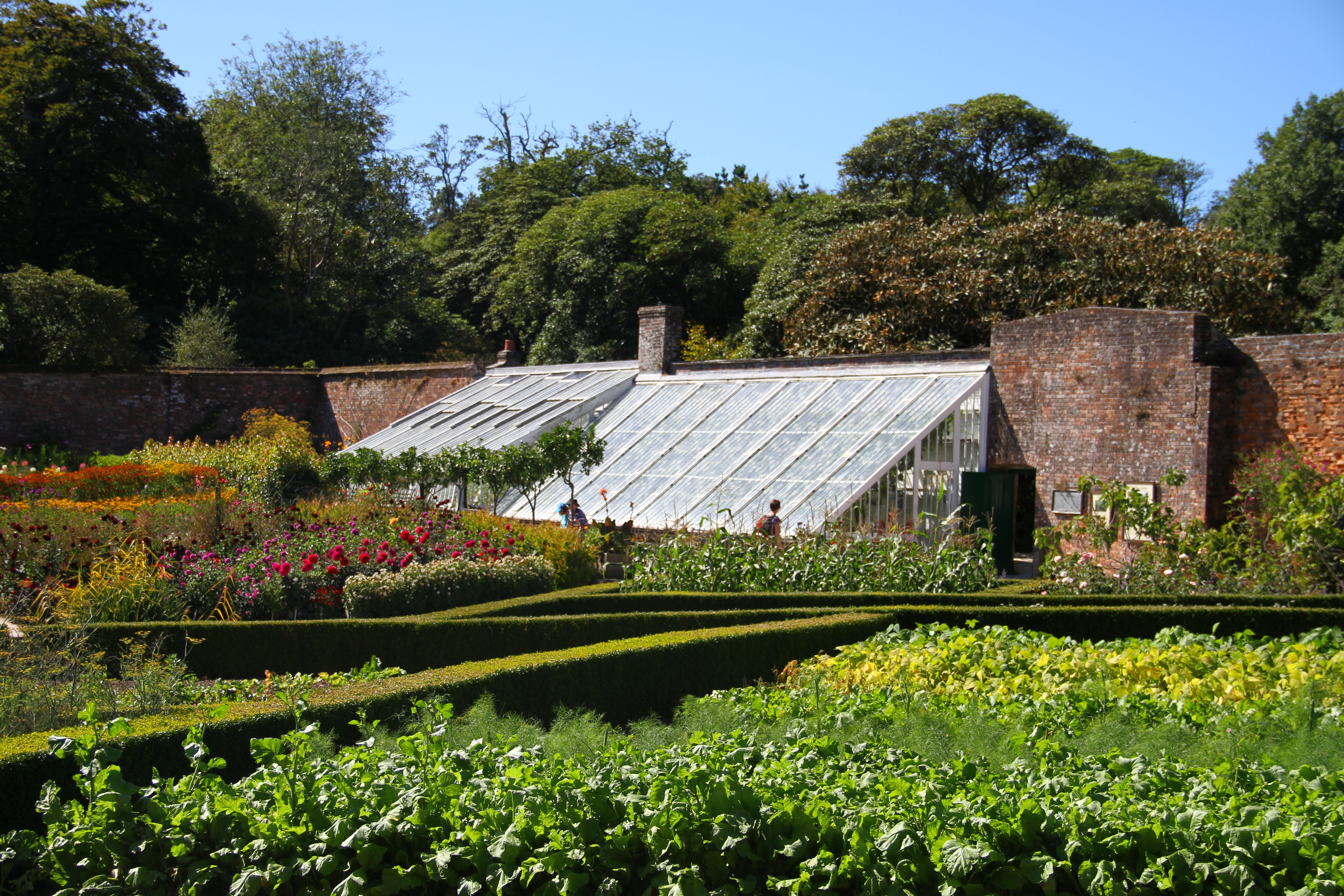
The Flower Garden

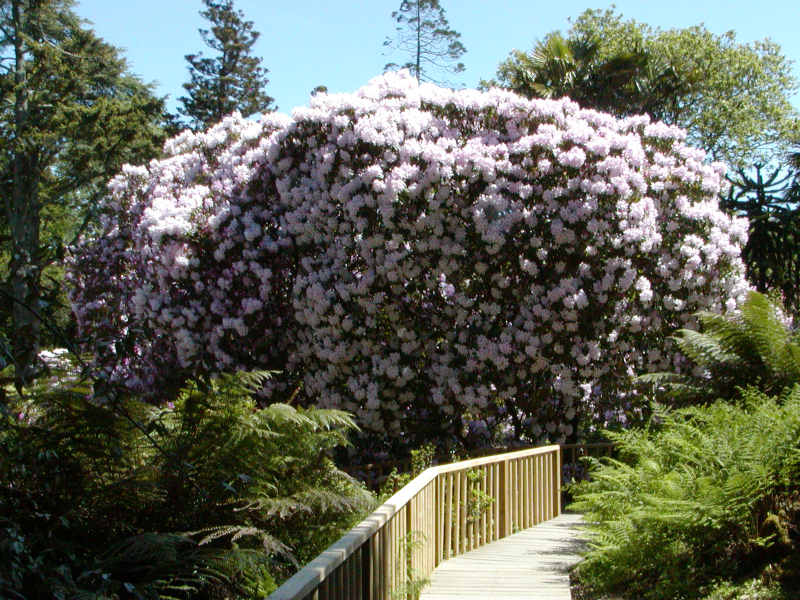
Rhododendron in the Jungle

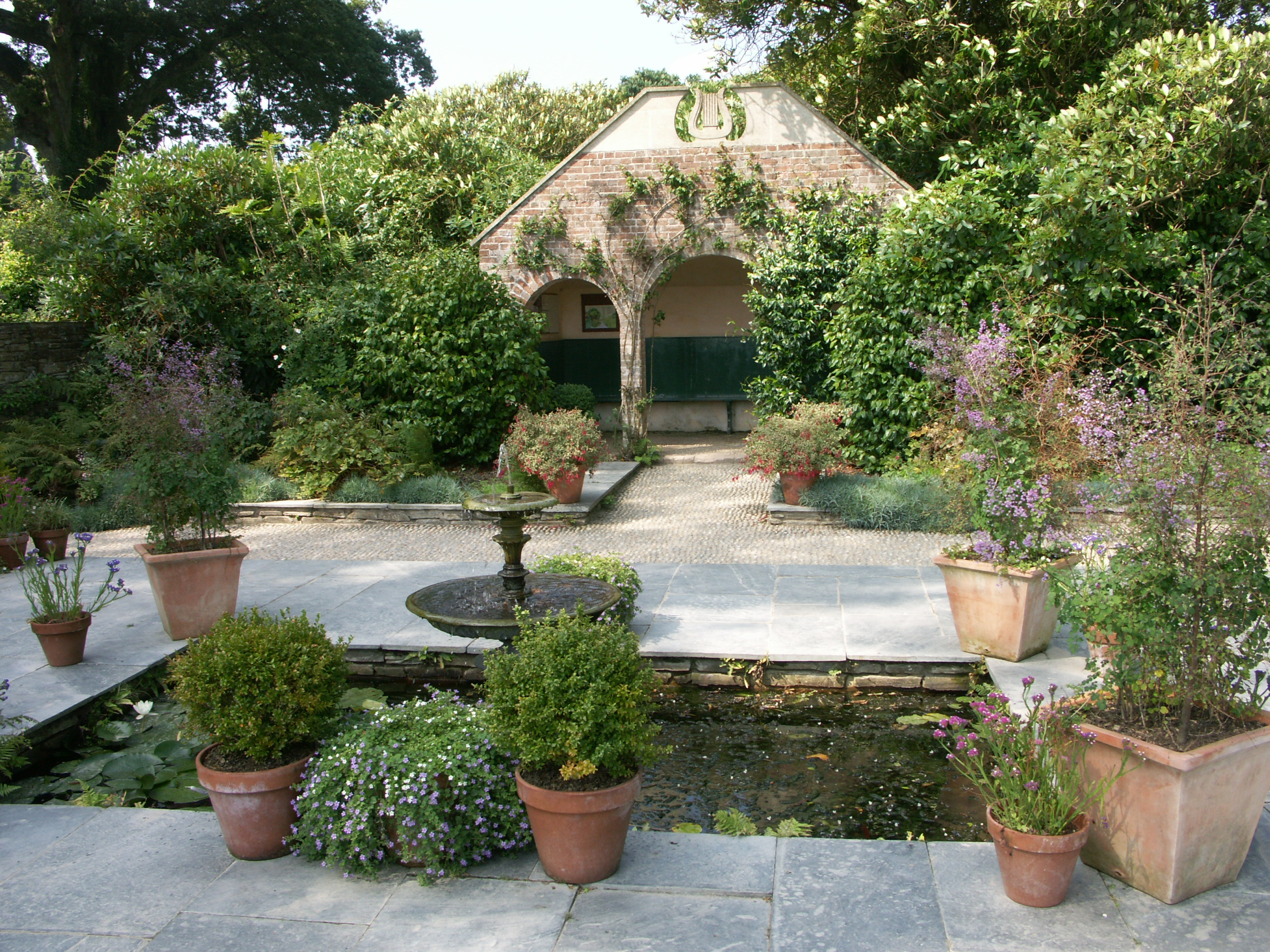
The Northern Summerhouse

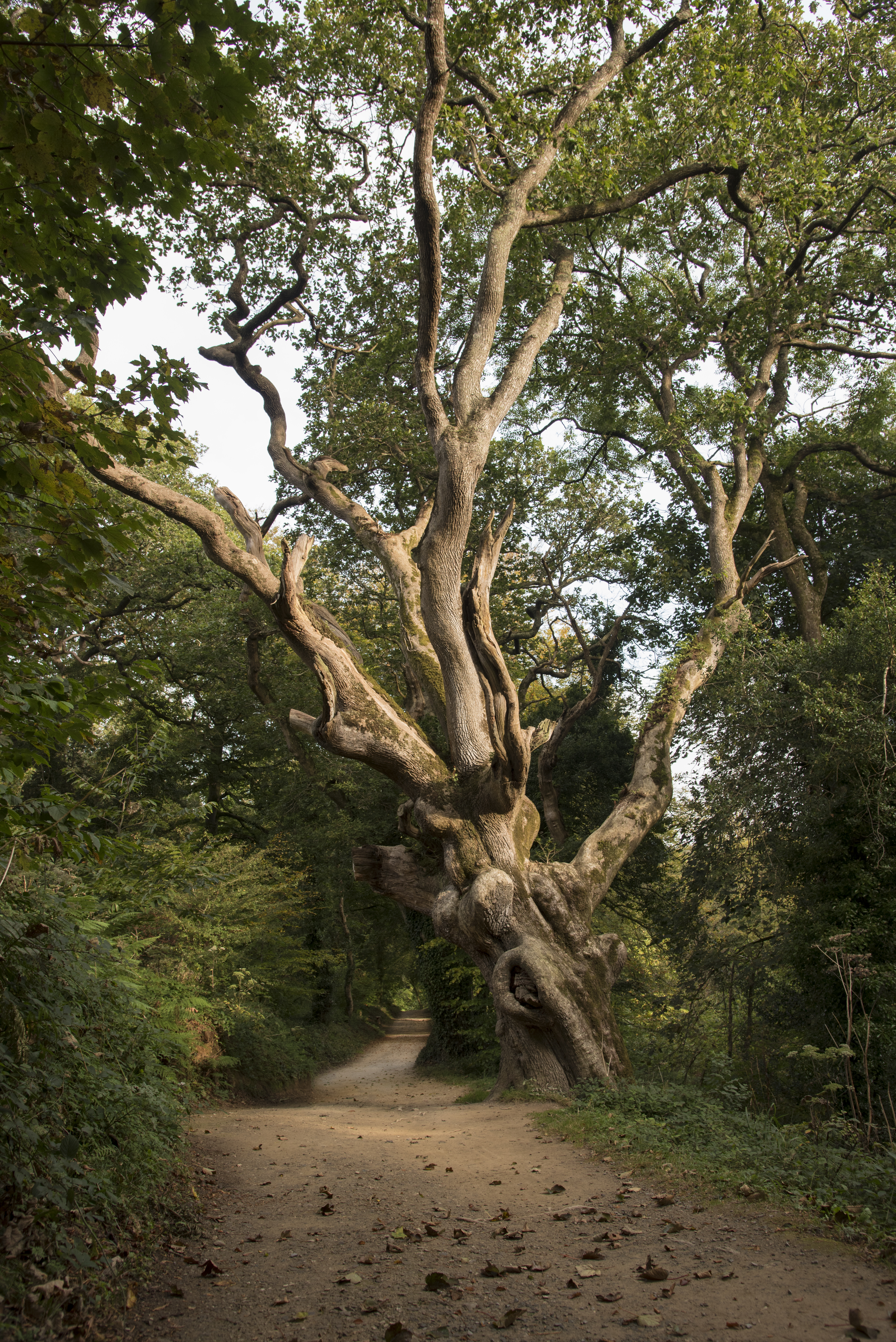
The Georgian Ride

The Lost Gardens of Heligan (Cornish: Lowarth Helygen, meaning willow tree garden) are located near Mevagissey in Cornwall, England and are considered to be amongst the most popular in the UK. The gardens are typical of the 19th century Gardenesque style with areas of different character and in different design styles.

The gardens were created by members of the Cornish Tremayne family from the mid-18th century to the beginning of the 20th century, and still form part of the family's Heligan estate. The gardens were neglected after the First World War and restored only in the 1990s, a restoration that was the subject of several popular television programmes and books.

The gardens include aged and colossal rhododendrons and camellias, a series of lakes fed by a ram pump over 100 years old, highly productive flower and vegetable gardens, an Italian garden, and a wild area filled with subtropical tree ferns called "The Jungle". The gardens also have Europe's only remaining pineapple pit, warmed by rotting manure, and two figures made from rocks and plants known as the Mud Maid and the Giant's Head.

They are listed Grade II in Historic England's Register of Parks and Gardens.

The place name, properly pronounced /hɛˈlɪkɛn/, and not the commonly heard /ˈhɛlɪɡən/, is derived from the Cornish word helygen, "willow tree".

== Geography ==
The Lost Gardens of Heligan completely surround Heligan House and its private gardens. They lie some 1.5 mi (2.4 km) to the north-west of, and about 250 ft (76 m) above, the fishing village of Mevagissey. The gardens are 6 mi (9.7 km) by road from the town and railway station of St Austell and are principally in the civil parish of St Ewe, although elements of the eastern gardens are in Mevagissey parish.

The northern part of the gardens, which includes the main ornamental and vegetable gardens, are slightly higher than the house and slope gently down to it. The areas of the gardens to the west, south, and east of the house slope steeply down into a series of valleys that ultimately drain into the sea at Mevagissey. These areas are much wilder and include the Jungle and the Lost Valley.

== History ==
The Heligan estate was originally bought by the Tremaynes in the 16th century, and earlier members of the family were responsible for Heligan House and the (still private) gardens that immediately surround it.

However, the more extensive gardens now open to the public were largely the result of the efforts of four successive squires of Heligan. These were:

- Rev. Henry Hawkins Tremayne
- John Hearle Tremayne, son of Henry Hawkins Tremayne
- John Tremayne, son of John Hearle Tremayne
- John Claude Lewis Tremayne, son of John Tremayne and better known as "Jack"

Two estate plans, dating from 1777 and sometime before 1810, show the changes wrought to the Heligan estate during Henry Hawkins' ownership. The first plan shows a predominantly parkland estate, with the site of today's Northern Gardens occupied by a field. The second plan shows the development of shelter belts of trees surrounding the gardens, and the main shape of the Northern Gardens, the Mellon Yard and the Flower Garden are all readily discernible.

Henry Hawkins' descendants each made significant contributions to the development of the gardens, including the ornamental plantings along the estate's Long Drive, The Jungle, the hybridising of rhododendrons and their planting around Flora's Green, and the creation of the Italian Garden.

Before the First World War, the garden required the services of 22 gardeners to maintain it, but that war led to the deaths of 16 of those gardeners, and by 1916, the garden was being looked after by only eight men. By the 1920s, Jack Tremayne's love of Italy, which had earlier inspired the Italian Garden, led him to set up permanent home there, and lease out Heligan. The house was tenanted for most of the 20th century, used by the US Army during the Second World War, and then converted into flats and sold, without the gardens, in the 1970s. Against this background, the gardens fell into a serious state of neglect, and were lost to sight.

After the childless death of Jack Tremayne, the Heligan estate came under the ownership of a trust to the benefit of several members of the extended Tremayne family. One of these, John Willis, lived in the area and was responsible for introducing record producer Tim Smit to the gardens. A group of fellow enthusiasts and he decided to restore the garden to its former glory, and eventually leased them from the Tremayne family.

The restoration, which was the subject of a six-part Channel 4 television series produced by Bamboo Productions and Cicada Films in 1996, proved to be an outstanding success, not only revitalising the gardens but also the local economy around Heligan by providing employment. The gardens are now leased by a company owned by their restorers, who continue to cultivate them and operate them as a visitor attraction.

== Media ==
- Free Range Television (Ed.): Heligan. Past, Present & Future. A Tenth Anniversary Celebration. Heligan 2001. (DVD)
- Vivianne Howard (director), Barbara Flynn (narrator), Rosemary Forgan & Frances Berrigan (Producers): The lost gardens of Heligan: an exquisite garden emerging like "Sleeping Beauty" from its seventy year sleep, London 1997: Channel 4 Video. (VHS cassette) ASIN B00004CTZH
- The Return To The Lost Gardens Of Heligan – The Myths And Discoveries Michael Hutchinson (director, Rosemary Forgan & Frances Berrigan (Producers), Channel 4 Video (VHS cassette) ASIN B00004CY3I
- "Heligan: Secrets of the Lost Gardens". Natural World episode 3, 2011–2012, BBC2. First broadcast 17 Aug 2011
