= Pineapple pit =

Method of growing pineapples in colder climates

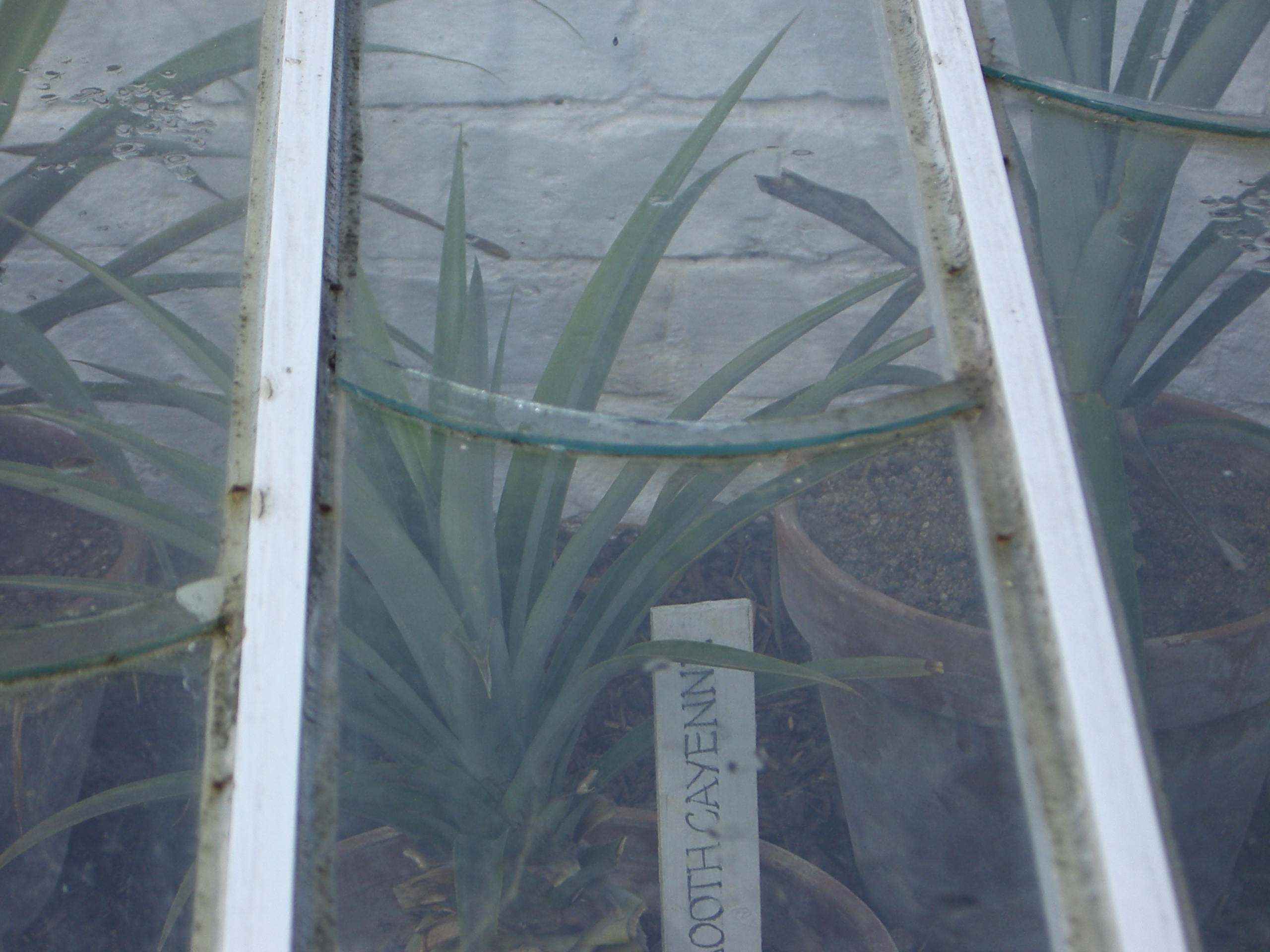
Close up of a pineapple inside the pineapple pit at the Lost Gardens of Heligan, Cornwall, UK

A pineapple pit is a method of growing pineapples in colder climates. One of the earliest examples in Britain has been found by archaeologists at Heligan in Cornwall. The first pineapples known to have been grown in Europe were cultivated in the Netherlands in 1685. None were grown in England until about 1715.

== Method of cultivation ==
The pineapple pit consisted of three trenches covered with glass, slightly below ground level, connected with two cavity walls. The outer troughs were kept filled with 15 tonnes of fresh horse manure, which gave off heat as it decomposed. This heat passed through small gaps at the bottom of the wall, rose up, and was then forced through gaps at the top of the wall, into the central trough. The central trough is where the pineapples were grown, at an artificially high temperature, due to the manure.

== Maintenance and obsolescence ==
A pineapple pit requires a huge amount of fresh manure, and manual labour to maintain the temperature of the central trench.

The introduction of steam ships meant that the pineapple pit became obsolete, as it was cheaper to transport fruit from overseas than to grow them under special conditions in the UK. In 2012 the cost of growing a pineapple in a pineapple pit in Cornwall was estimated to be in excess of £1000 if costs of manure, maintenance of the pits and staff costs were added up.

== Modern pineapple pits ==
An original pineapple pit was discovered at the Lost Gardens of Heligan in the UK, and renovated in 1993 by John Nelson, architectural historian John Chamberlain, and horticultural historian Peter Thoday. The original design was by Thomas Andrew Knight FRS. It uses two varieties of South African pineapples, Jamaica Queen and Smooth Cayenne. In 1997, the first pineapple was successfully grown in the renovated pit. The second pineapple grown there was presented to Queen Elizabeth II of the UK.
