= Mevagissey =

Village in Cornwall, England

Coordinates: 50.2702°N 4.7874°W

Mevagissey: Cornish: Lannvorek
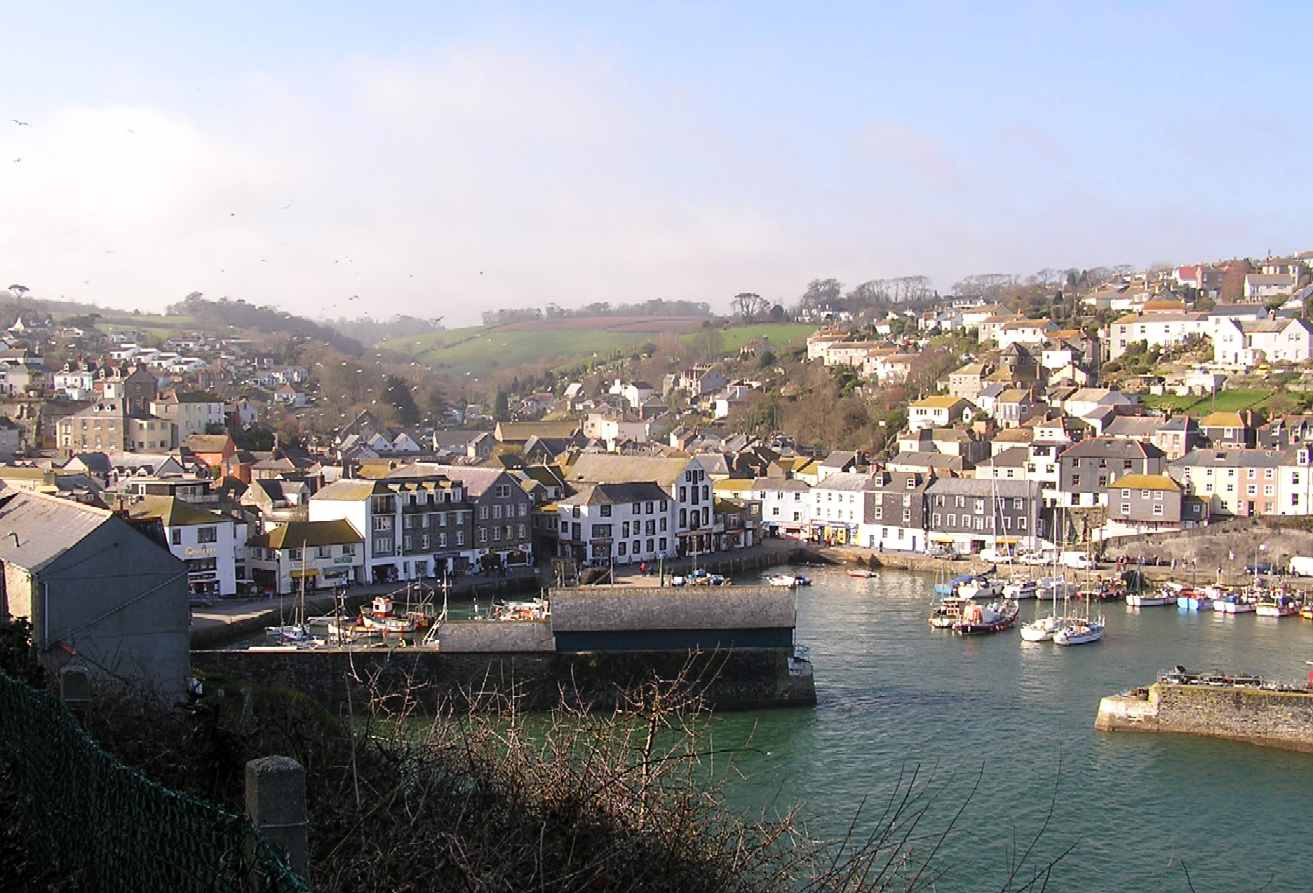
- Mevagissey harbour

- Location within Cornwall
- Population: 2,160 (Parish, 2021); 1,749 (Built up area, 2021)
- OS grid reference: SX014449
- Civil parish: Mevagissey
- Unitary authority: Cornwall
- Ceremonial county: Cornwall
- Region: South West
- Country: England
- Sovereign state: United Kingdom
- Post town: ST. AUSTELL
- Postcode district: PL26
- Dialling code: 01726
- Police: Devon and Cornwall
- Fire: Cornwall
- Ambulance: South Western
- UK Parliament: St Austell and Newquay

Mevagissey (/ˌmɛvəˈɡɪzi/; Cornish: Lannvorek) is a village, fishing port and civil parish in Cornwall, England, United Kingdom. The village is approximately five miles (8 km) south of St Austell. At the 2021 census the population of the parish was 2,160 and the population of the built up area was 1,749.

The village nestles in a small valley and faces east to Mevagissey Bay. The inner and outer harbours are busy with a mixture of pleasure vessels and working fishing boats. It has a thriving fishing industry and is the second biggest fishing port in Cornwall.

Mevagissey village centre consists of narrow streets with many places to eat and shops aimed at the tourist trade. The outer areas are built on the steep slopes of the surrounding hillsides and are mostly residential.

== History and legend ==
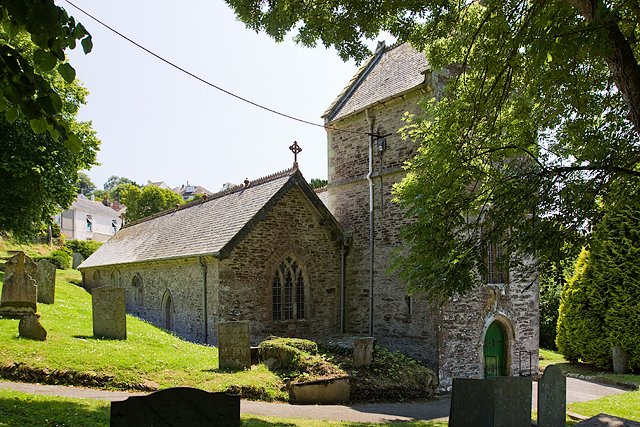
St Peter's Church, Mevagissey

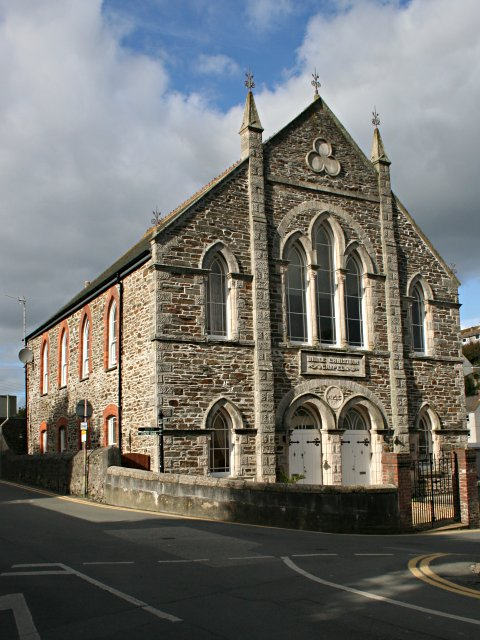
Former Mevagissey Methodist Chapel

The first recorded mention of Mevagissey dates from 1313 (when it was known as Porthhilly), although there is evidence of settlement dating back to the Bronze Age.

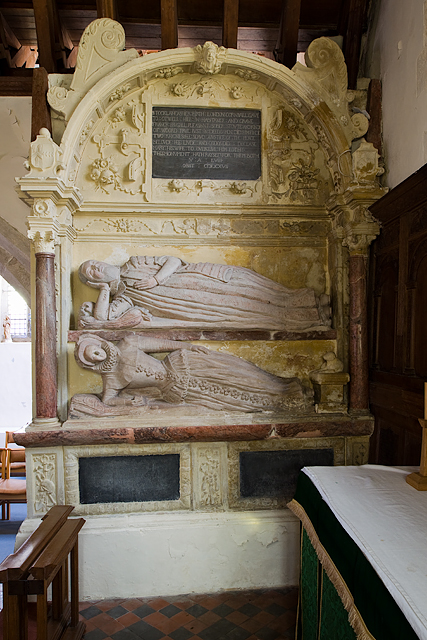
The monument to Otwell Hill (died 1617) and his wife

The old name of the parish was Lamorrick, and it was part of the episcopal manor of Tregear. The church was dedicated to Saints Meva and Ida in 1259 by Bishop Bronescombe and in 1329 Sir Otho Bodrugan appropriated it to Glasney College. The Norman church was cruciform and some Norman work remains but the church was more or less rebuilt in the 15th century. In the Commonwealth period the tower became ruinous and the bells were taken down and sold to a Quaker of St Austell. According to tradition there has been a church on the same site since about 500 AD. Meva may well be the same as St Mewan and Issey is also the patron saint of St Issey.

Mevagissey is home to three holy wells. The Brass Well and Lady's Well are both situated in the manor of Treleaven, and the third is within the gardens of Mevagissey House, the old vicarage.

Towards the end of the 17th century, Porthhilly merged with the hamlet of Lamoreck (or Lamorrick) to make the new village. It was renamed "Meva hag Ysi", after two saints; St Mevan/Mewan, a Welsh man and an Irish woman, St Issey or Ida/Ita, (hag is the Cornish word for "and"). There is no evidence for why this new name was adopted but it may have been due to the Church replacing a Cornish name with a Christian one. The modern Cornish name is Lannvorek, after the old parish name. At this time the main sources of income for the village were pilchard fishing and smuggling and the village had at least ten inns, of which the Fountain and the Ship still remain. In early modern times there was already a thriving pilchard industry; great numbers of the fish were caught, cured and exported to Italy, the West Indies and as Royal Navy provisions; the greatest annual catch being in 1724.

Andrew Pears, the founder of Pears' Soap was born in the village in 1768 and set up a barber's shop here until he moved to London in 1789.

Cornish wrestling tournaments, for prizes, were held in Mevagissey in the 1800s and 1900s.

A local legend relates that during the Napoleonic Wars a ship was wrecked with the loss of all on board; however a monkey who grabbed a spar came to land. The suspicious villagers had not seen such a creature before so decided to treat it as a French spy so it was duly hanged on the beach. (A more elaborate version has been found at Hartlepool whose inhabitants are colloquially known as monkey hangers.)

== Governance ==
There are two tiers of local government covering Mevagissey, at parish and unitary authority level: Mevagissey Parish Council and Cornwall Council. The parish council generally meets at the Mevagissey Activity Centre on Valley Road.

The parish lies within the parliamentary constituency of St Austell and Newquay; it had previously been in the Truro and St Austell, & Truro constituencies.

=== Administrative history ===
Mevagissey was an ancient parish in the Powder Hundred of Cornwall. The parish was abolished in 1934 when the area was absorbed into the St Austell Urban District. St Austell Urban District was replaced in 1968 by the larger borough of St Austell with Fowey, which was in turn abolished six years later in 1974 to become part of the larger borough of Restormel. A new civil parish of Mevagissey was created in 1983.

Restormel was abolished in 2009. Cornwall County Council then took on district-level functions, making it a unitary authority, and was renamed Cornwall Council.

== Religion ==
It is in the Anglican Diocese of Truro, the Archdeaconry of Cornwall, and the Deanery of St Austell. The parish church has been rededicated to St Peter. The parish has been grouped with St Mewan and St Ewe.

The Methodist chapel is no longer in use; there is a United Reformed chapel of St Andrew which is also used by the Methodists; it was once a Congregational school.

== Harbour ==
Mevagissey Pier Act 1775
- Act of Parliament
- Parliament of Great Britain
- Long title: An Act for completing and maintaining the Pier at the Town of Mevagssey, in the County of Cornwall.
- Citation: 15 Geo. 3. c. 62
- Territorial extent: Great Britain

Dates
- Royal assent: 22 May 1775
- Commencement: 29 November 1774 (Note: Start of session.)
- Repealed: 19 June 1865
Other legislation
Repealed by	Pier and Harbour Orders Confirmation Act 1865 (No. 3)

Status: Repealed

Text of statute as originally enacted

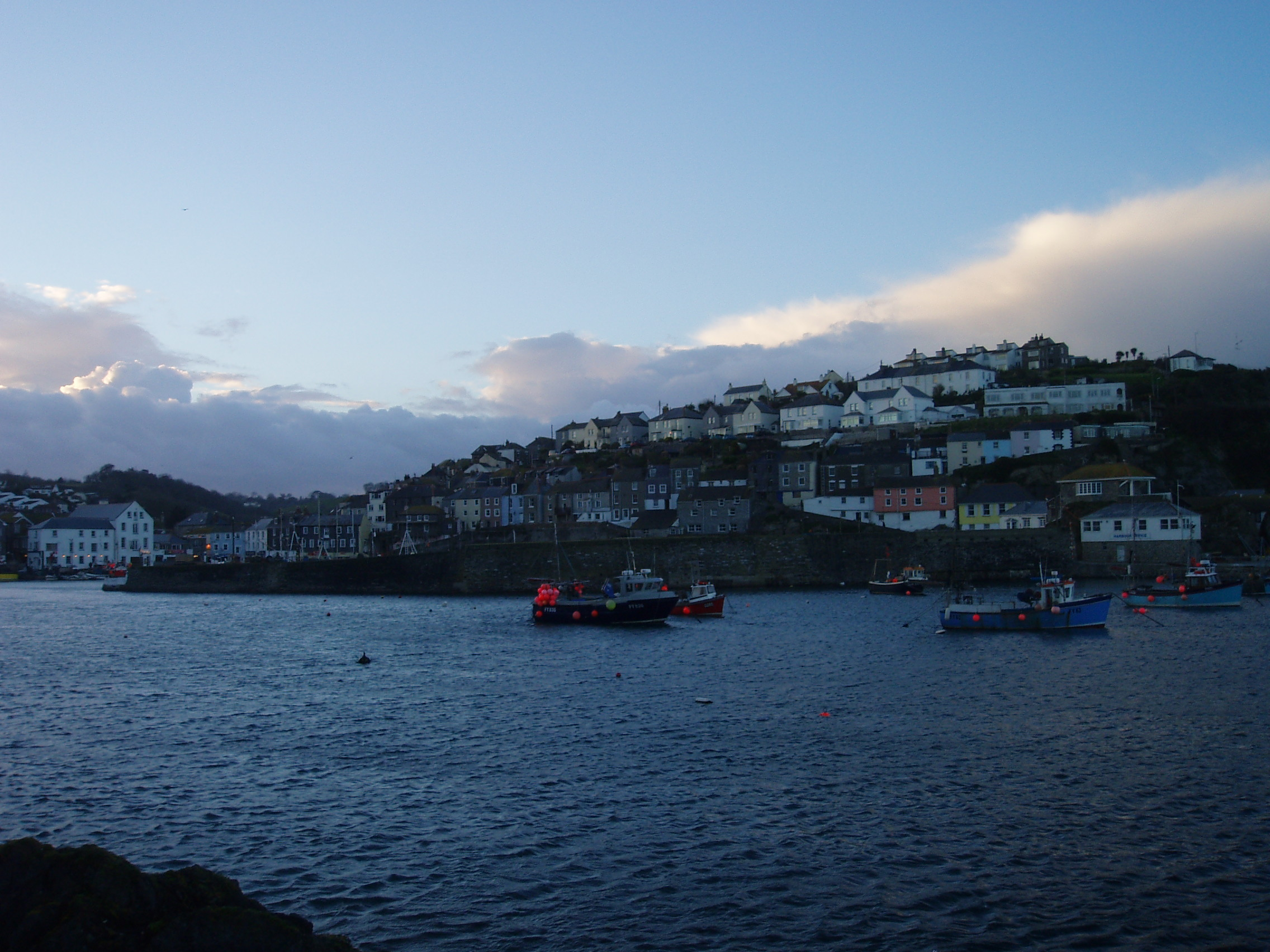
Mevagissey harbour at dusk

The harbour is built on the site of a medieval quay. The first act of Parliament allowing the new port to be built was the Mevagissey Pier Act 1775 (15 Geo. 3. c. 62). The inner harbour, consisting of the current East and West Quays, was constructed from this time. An outer harbour was added in 1888, having been authorised by the Mevagissey Harbour Order 1886 but seriously damaged in a blizzard in 1891. Repairs were authorised by the Mevagissey Harbour Order 1892, and the outer walls were rebuilt by 1897. The harbour was given charitable trust status in 1988.

The Royal National Lifeboat Institution (RNLI) opened Mevagissey Lifeboat Station in 1869, although the lifeboat was kept at Portmellon until 1888. It was kept afloat in the harbour for a few years but a purpose-built concrete boat house with a slipway was opened in 1897. The neighbouring station at Fowey was provided with a motor lifeboat in 1928 which proved capable of covering the area around Mevagissey so the station was closed in 1930. The old boat house was later turned into an aquarium.

Mevagissey lighthouse was built in 1896 to mark the south breakwater that protects the small harbour.

In 1880 there were around sixty fishing-boats engaged in the mackerel fishery, and herring and pilchards were also important fisheries. Pilchards were also imported from Plymouth for curing at the Cornish Sardine Factory and the imported salt was also used for adding to butter at the same factory. Barley, grown nearby, was exported to Campbeltown, Scotland.

There are currently 63 registered fishing vessels in the harbour worked by 69 fishermen. The harbour also offers tourist fishing trips and there is a regular summer passenger ferry to Fowey.

== Mevagissey today ==
Each year at the end of June, Mevagissey celebrates Feast Week, a week of family fun, music, and floral dances through the streets. At the end of the week there is a carnival and a fireworks display.

Mevagissey is within the Cornwall Area of Outstanding Natural Beauty (AONB). Areas of Outstanding Natural Beauty, along with national parks, are considered to be the most special landscapes in the country and belong to an international family of protected areas. It is a designation aimed at conserving and enhancing the natural beauty of the area.

=== Healthcare ===
In May 2019 the sole partner at the Mevagissey GP surgery announced that she was handing back the contract, and villagers faced a trip to St Austell to see a doctor.

=== Hitler's Walk ===
A park in Mevagissey is popularly named Hitler's Walk by locals. Local folklore attributes this naming to the 1930s use of the park by a local councillor who was perceived to have displayed petty authoritarian tendencies; while others say it was because the home guard would patrol there looking for invasion forces from Germany. The park was the subject of controversy and national news headlines in September 2005 when signs bearing the name were removed after complaints to Restormel Borough Council, and again in January 2015 after the Mevagissey Parish Council decided to reinstate them. Harvey Kurzfield of Kehillat Kernow described the decision to restore the signage as "outrageous and completely unfeeling" and urged Jewish people to boycott the village. In February 2015 it was reported that the council had dropped the plans to reinstate the signs.

=== Heligan ===
The Heligan estate is located on the steep slopes above Mevagissey, albeit mostly in the adjoining civil parish of St Ewe. The long term home of the Tremayne family, the estate is now best known as the location of the Lost Gardens of Heligan, a recently restored Victorian garden.

== Notable people ==
- John Tremayne (1647–1694), an English lawyer and politician. He became a Serjeant-at-Law and King's Serjeant.
- Andrew Pears (c.1770-1845), he invented transparent soap and trained as a barber.
- Samuel Dunn (1798–1882), Methodist minister and religious writer.
- Matthew Hunkin (1815–1888), a sailor, trader, missionary, and member of the London Missionary Society (LMS). He was one of the first Europeans to settle in the Samoan Islands.
- Annie Walke, painter of the Newlyn School

== In popular culture ==
The writer Susan Cooper based two of her books (Over Sea, Under Stone and Greenwitch) in her well-known fantasy series The Dark Is Rising in Mevagissey (named 'Trewissick' in the books), where she used to holiday as a child. Mevagissey House is the vicarage from the first book 'Over Sea Under Stone', where Jane first meets the mysterious Mr Hastings.

The Wurzels wrote a song called "Mevagissey".

In an episode of the 1990s BBC children's television series Maid Marian and Her Merry Men, the Sheriff of Nottingham (played by Tony Robinson) says that "The country is suffering under the worst cold spell since King Arthur sat on The Magic Icicle of Mevagissey".

The inaugural episode of the popular BBC Two television cooking series Two Fat Ladies was filmed primarily in Mevagissey and the surrounding countryside.

== In film ==
Mevagissey is a popular location for filmmakers and advertisers. It featured in The Next of Kin, 1942; Johnny Frenchman, 1945; Never Let Me Go, 1953; Dracula, 1979; Bad Education, 2015; and Playing Nice, 2025.
