= John Rashleigh (1619–1693) of Coombe =

English politician (1619–1693)

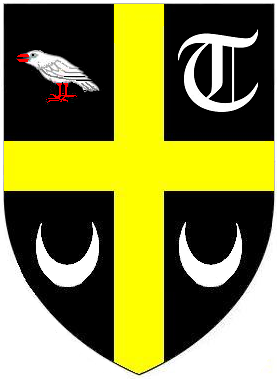
Arms of Rashleigh: Sable, a cross or between in the first quarter: a Cornish chough, argent beaked and legged gules; in the second quarter: a text "T"; in the third and fourth quarters: a crescent all of the third

John Rashleigh (21 January 1619 – 13 March 1693) of Coombe, near Fowey in Cornwall, was MP for Fowey from 1661 to 1679. He was a member of a branch of the more prominent Rashleigh family of Menabilly, near Fowey.

Rashleigh was the only surviving son of Robert Rashleigh (1585 – c. 1667), MP, of Coombe, near Fowey, Cornwall, by his first wife Mary Trefusis, daughter of Thomas Trefusis of Landew.

He matriculated at Brasenose College, Oxford in 1637 and entered Gray's Inn in 1639.

He married in 1642 his cousin Elizabeth, the daughter of Jonathan Rashleigh of Menabilly, Cornwall and had 5 sons and 2 daughters

Parliament of England
Preceded by John Barton; Edward Herle	Member of Parliament for Fowey; 1661–1679; With: Jonathan Rashleigh I 1661–1675; Jonathan Rashleigh II 1675–1679	Succeeded by Jonathan Rashleigh II; John Treffry
