= Jonathan Rashleigh =

Jonathan Rashleigh may refer to:

- Jonathan Rashleigh (1591–1675), English landowner and politician, MP for Fowey in 1614, 1621, 1625, April 1640 and November 1640, and 1661
- Jonathan Rashleigh (1642–1702), English landowner and politician, MP for Fowey 1675-81 and 1689-95
- Jonathan Rashleigh (1693–1764), English landowner and politician, MP for Fowey 1727–64
- Jonathan Rashleigh (1820–1905), English landowner, local politician, collector and numismatist
