= Jonathan Rashleigh (1591–1675) =

English shipping-merchant

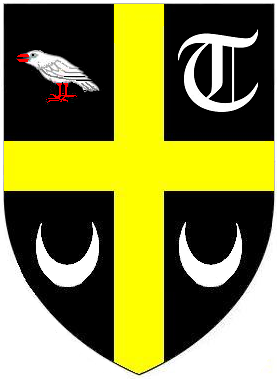
Arms of Rashleigh: Sable, a cross or between in the first quarter: a Cornish chough, argent beaked and legged gules; in the second quarter: a text "T"; in the third and fourth quarters: a crescent all of the third

Jonathan I Rashleigh (4 July 1591 – 1 May 1675), of Menabilly, near Fowey in Cornwall, was an English shipping-merchant, Member of Parliament for Fowey in 1614, 1621, 1625, April 1640 and November 1640, and 1661 and served as Sheriff of Cornwall in 1627. He supported the Royalist cause during the Civil War.

== Family ==
He was the second son and heir of John Rashleigh (1554–1624), MP for Fowey in 1588. He married twice. His first marriage was on 17 December 1614, to Anne Basset (c. 1595 – 1631), eldest daughter of Sir Robert Basset (1573–1641) of Umberleigh and Heanton Punchardon in Devon, MP for Plymouth in 1593, by his wife Elizabeth Periam (1571–1635), the second daughter and co-heiress of Sir William Peryam, Lord Chief Baron of the Exchequer. By Anne he had five children including:

- John Rashleigh (1621–1651), who pre-deceased his father, whose mural monument exists in Kenton Church. Devon. He married Joan Pollexfen (died 1668), daughter of John Pollexfen of Mothecombe, Devon, and was the father of Jonathan Rashleigh II (1642–1702), of Menabilly, many times MP for Fowey and Sheriff of Cornwall in 1687
- Alice Rashleigh, wife of Sir Peter Courtney (c.1616 – 1670), MP, of Trethurfe, Cornwall.
- Elizabeth Rashleigh, who married her cousin from the senior Cornwall line, John Rashleigh (1619–1693) of Coombe, Fowey, MP for Fowey in 1661

His second marriage was in 1633 to Mary Harris (died 1674), daughter of John Harris of Radford, near Plymouth, Devon.

Rashleigh died on 1 May 1675 and was succeeded by his grandson Jonathan Rashleigh (1642–1702), of Menabilly, many times MP for Fowey and Sheriff of Cornwall in 1687.

== Career ==
Rashleigh was elected Member of Parliament for Fowey in 1614, 1621 and 1625. In 1627 he served as Sheriff of Cornwall. In April 1640 he was re-elected MP for Fowey for the Short Parliament and re-elected in November 1640 for the Long Parliament.} He supported the King in the Civil War and was disabled from sitting in parliament in 1644. He was bankrupted by penalties imposed on his estate and imprisoned in St Mawes castle. His fortunes were repaired at the Restoration in 1660. He was elected once more MP for Fowey to the Cavalier Parliament in 1661 and sat until his death at the age of 83.

== Notes ==
Parliament of England
Preceded by Henry Peter; Francis Vyvyan	Member of Parliament for Fowey; 1614–1622; With: Sir Edward Boys 1614; John Treffry 1621–22	Succeeded by William Noy; Robert Coke
Preceded by William Noy; Robert Coke	Member of Parliament for Fowey; 1625; With: Arthur Basset	Succeeded by Arthur Basset; William Murray
Preceded by Robert Rashleigh; Sir Richard Grenville	Member of Parliament for Fowey; 1640–1644; With: Edwin Rich 1640; Sir Richard Buller 1640–42	Vacant Title next held by Nicholas Gould; Gregory Clement
Preceded by John Barton; Edward Herle	Member of Parliament for Fowey; 1661–1675; With: John Rashleigh	Succeeded by John Rashleigh; Jonathan Rashleigh
