= Siege of Kinsale =

Battle in England's conquest of Gaelic Ireland

- Part of the 4th Spanish Armada and the Nine Years' War
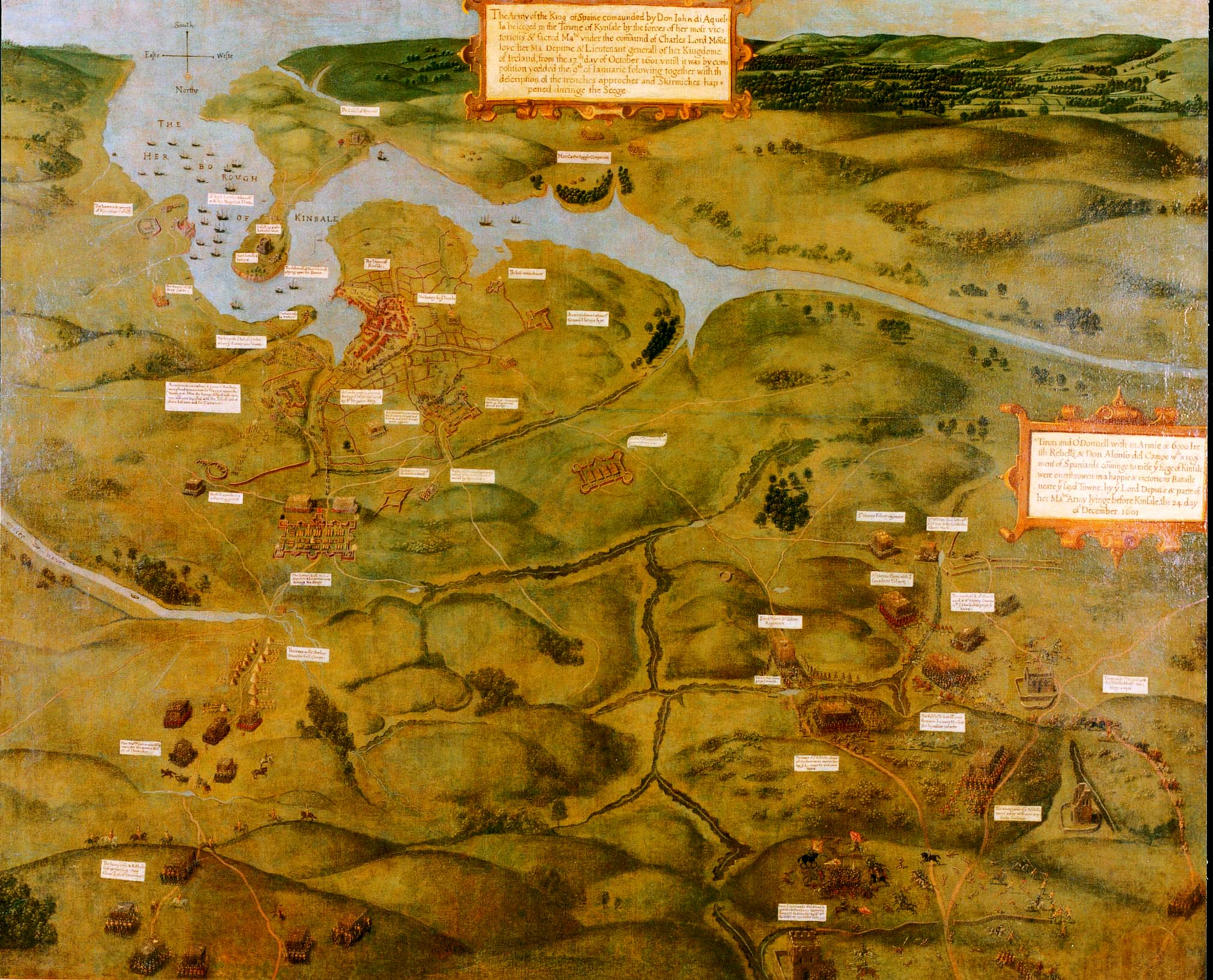
- Map of the siege of Kinsale, 1602
Date	2 October 1601 – 3 January 1602
Location	Kinsale, Kingdom of Ireland 51.6986°N 8.5122°W
Result	English victory

Belligerents
Kingdom of England: Irish loyalists	Irish confederacy Spain

Commanders and leaders
Charles Blount; George Carew; Richard Leveson; Donogh O'Brien	Hugh O'Neill; Juan del Águila (surrendered); Hugh Roe O'Donnell; Richard Tyrrell

Strength
11,800 infantry 857 cavalry	Irish alliance 6,000; Spanish; 3,500

Casualties and losses
Unknown casualties many deserted, sick or dead to disease	Irish alliance 1,200 killed, wounded or captured (many later executed); Spanish; 100 killed or wounded 3,400 surrendered

The siege of Kinsale (Irish: Léigear Chionn tSáile), also known as the battle of Kinsale, was the ultimate battle in England's conquest of Gaelic Ireland, commencing in October 1601, near the end of the reign of Queen Elizabeth I, and at the climax of the Nine Years' War—a campaign by Hugh O'Neill, Hugh Roe O'Donnell and other Irish lords against English rule.

Owing to Spanish involvement and the strategic advantages to be gained, the battle also formed part of the Anglo-Spanish War, the wider conflict of Protestant England against Catholic Spain.

== Background ==
Ireland had been claimed as a lordship by the English Crown since 1175 but had never been fully subjected to English rule. By the 1350s, England's sphere of influence had shrunk to the Pale, the area around Dublin, with the rest of the country under the rule of Gaelic lords. The Tudor monarchs, beginning with Henry VIII, attempted to reassert their authority in Ireland with a policy of conquest and colonisation. In 1594, forces in Ulster under the previously loyal Earl of Tyrone, Hugh O'Neill, rebelled. Hugh Roe O'Donnell and Hugh Maguire joined Tyrone's rebellion. A string of battlefield victories from 1593 to 1599, and an expansion of the war from Ulster through the midlands and into Munster, had wrested control of most of the island from the English Crown. By the end of 1599, the English controlled little beyond the walled towns and regional garrisons.

Following the failure of the Spanish Armada in 1588, Philip II decided to take advantage of the Irish rebels in order to create a new front in the war against England. Spanish aid was offered to the Irish rebels in the expectation that tying the English down in Ireland might draw English resources away from their allies in the Netherlands, the Dutch Estates, which were engaged in a long rebellion against Spanish rule, and provide another base for privateers, such as the Dunkirkers, to disrupt English and Dutch shipping. The 2nd Spanish Armada aimed at supporting the rebels, but it was smashed by storms off Cape Finisterre in October 1596. The ill Philip sent forth another armada the following year, but this too failed due to storms, bad luck and bad planning.

=== Spanish landing ===
After Philip II's death, Philip III continued to provide direct support (material support had been sent for years) to the Irish rebels fighting England. In 1601, Philip sent Don Juan del Águila and Don Diego Brochero to Ireland with 6,000 men and a significant amount of arms and ammunition. Bad weather separated the ships and nine of them, carrying the majority of the veteran soldiers and gunpowder, had to turn back. The remaining 4,000 men disembarked at Kinsale, just south of Cork, on 2 October 1601. Another force commanded by Alonso de Ocampo managed to land at Baltimore. The Spaniards rushed to fortify these footholds to withstand the approaching English armies.

Though the Spanish army had secured the town of Kinsale, they failed to expand their base into the surrounding region and were vulnerable to becoming besieged by English forces. On hearing of the Spanish landing, Charles Blount, Lord Mountjoy, the assigned Lord Deputy of Ireland, weakened the garrisons around the Pale and rushed to Kinsale with as many men as he could take.

== Siege ==
On 2 October, Mountjoy laid siege to Kinsale and reinforcements were brought in through Oysterhaven, bringing the army's numbers up to 12,000. This included a large force under Irish nobleman Donogh O'Brien, 4th Earl of Thomond. However many of these were Irish levies, and many were not suited to siege warfare, especially in winter. Many fell ill, leaving about 7,500 capable of fighting.

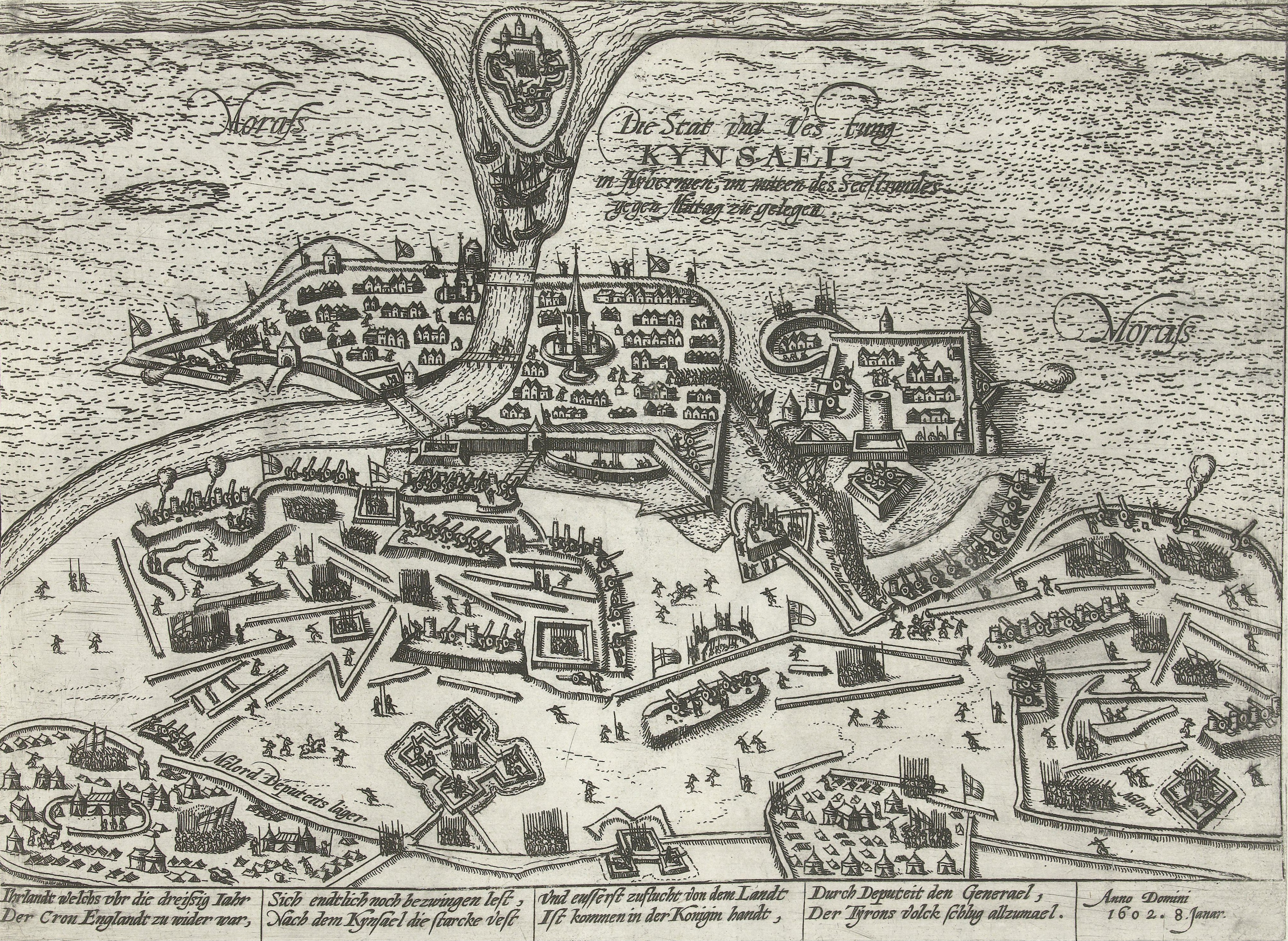
Map, with German annotations, depicting the siege of Kinsale

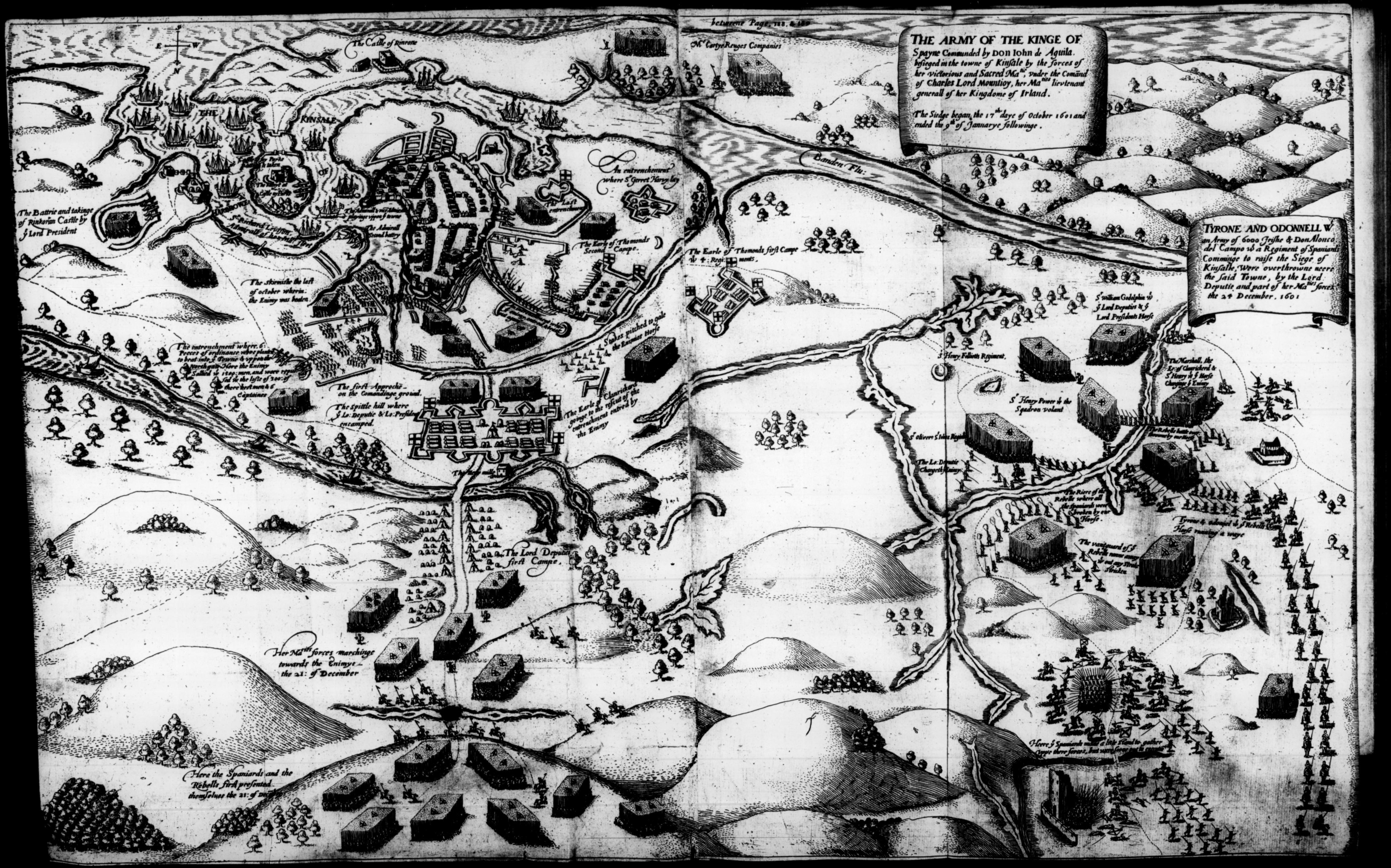
Siege of Kinsale in map in Pacata Hibernia (1633)

=== Tyrone and O'Donnell's march ===
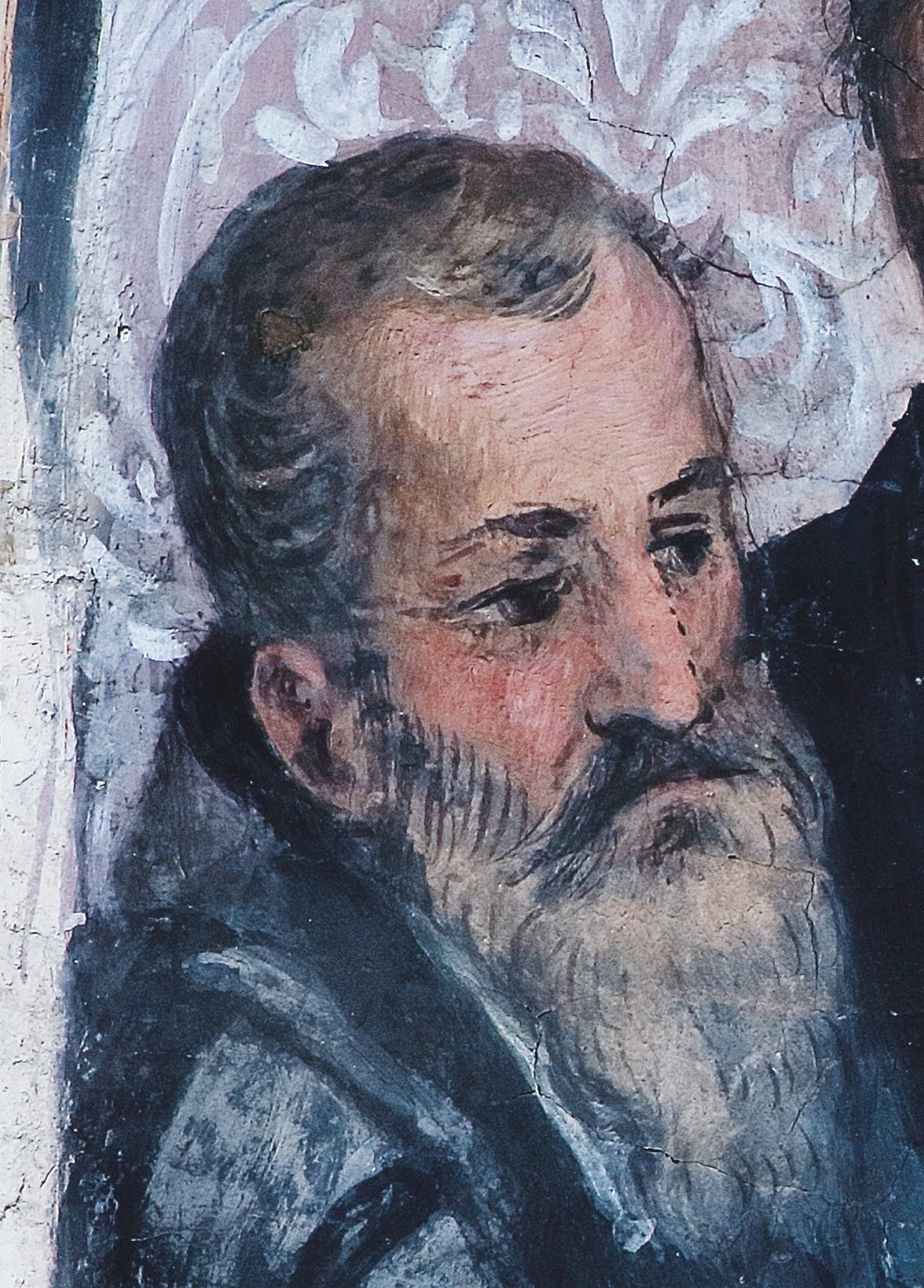
Hugh O'Neill, Earl of Tyrone, was the Irish confederacy's leader.

At the same time, the Gaelic Earls O'Neill and his ally O'Donnell considered their positions. Their difficulty was that the Spanish had landed on the south coast of Ireland, far away from the areas under control of the Irish chieftains. In order to bring aid to the Spanish troops they would have to lead their troops into regions where support for their cause was doubtful. They hesitated for weeks as autumn turned into a particularly wet and stormy winter. The besieged Spanish garrison began to suffer from the lack of supplies and privation, and O'Neill was forced to go to their aid. He fully understood that should this first Spanish force suffer defeat, he would be unlikely to receive further military help. The decision of the Spanish to land at Kinsale forced O'Neill to agree with his more impetuous ally, Red Hugh O'Donnell, to abandon his hitherto successful guerilla tactics and risk open confrontation. A large force would be necessary; larger than they could afford to lose. They set out on a 300-mile (480 km) winter march, separately to ease supply, O'Neill with 2500 foot and 500 horse and O'Donnell with 1500 foot and 300 horse. After a few deceptions and some hard marching in hazardous conditions, the two forces rendezvoused and encamped at Kinalmeaky to rest and provision the army where they were joined by additional forces from Leinster and Munster.

At the time of the Spanish landing, there were only two English ships on the Irish station to give assistance to Mountjoy. They arrived after the Spanish shipping had left. They were Tremontana under Captain Charles Plessington and Moon under Captain Thomas Button.

=== Seizure of outer defences ===
At the end of October, a number of cannon was sent by Mountjoy to bombard Ringcurran fort. The guns from the English siege works pounded the small fort. Don Pedro de Heredia, the Spanish commander, turned down a request for its surrender. The bombardment resumed and this time, with the guns of Captain Button's Moon, a breach was opened. The small number of Irish soldiers fled, fearing for their lives—Heredia decided it was best to flee too, with some fifty Spaniards. However, an English patrol spotted them, and most surrendered. In the meantime a Spanish force from Kinsale itself attempted to relieve the garrison. Lieutenant-colonel Francis Roe, with a hundred men, became heavily engaged in skirmishes with a force twice his number. Roe's commanding officer Sir Oliver St John, seeing that Spanish pikemen were preparing to charge, personally led thirty musketmen to reinforce Roe, and the Spanish were driven into retreat. Ringcurran fell soon after—Captain Paez de Clavijo, with 86 Spanish prisoners, agreed to surrender, leaving the besieged without any access to the sea. The prisoners were sent to Cork.

Carew had reached the English camp by the 15 November with 1,000 men and 250 horse. Two days later, Castle Ny-Parke, which guarded the harbour entrance, was the next English target. An assault using a wooden siege engine failed when it collapsed before the fort, and the English retreated. Águila attempted to relieve the fort but a small force of Spaniards in boats was repelled by English naval gunfire. Two days later the fort was taken in an assault by English troops, led by Sir Richard Smyth, after a breach had been made in the defences. All 33 men were either killed, wounded or captured. With this higher ground seized, they subjected the Spanish forces to constant artillery fire.

=== English blockade and reinforcements ===
Leveson meanwhile had to wait a further week before he got under way. They did not arrive until 12 November; the English ships then formed a tight blockade of Kinsale harbour. Mountjoy, however, was not very impressed by what he saw, protesting that only one in ten of the troops could shoot a gun.

The English cavalry rode through the surrounding countryside, destroying livestock and crops, while both sides called for allegiance from the population. O'Neill and O'Donnell were hesitant about leaving Ulster vulnerable to attack by marching south, especially given the lack of supplies for their troops. When they set out, they successfully cut English supply lines across the island and, by December, the shortage of supplies and the severe weather had begun to take a toll on the besieging English army, with many dying of dysentery and fever.

=== Battle of Kinsale ===
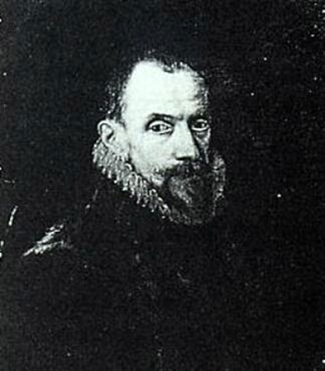
Spanish commander Juan del Águila

==== Initial moves ====
Reinforcements arrived from Spain at Castlehaven, and on 24 December 1601 (English date, 3 January 1602 for the Catholic Irish and Spanish armies) moved into position at Coolcarron about three miles from the English camp. At about midnight the Irish, in two columns, led by Hugh O'Neill and O'Donnell, set out from their camp at Coolcarron and marched for the ridgeline at Ardmartin overlooking the English encampment. The English scouts of Sir Richard Greames' horse, on outpost that night, were supposedly made aware of these movements when they observed the lit match of the Irish arquebusiers in the gloomy pre-dawn moving into position on Ardmartin. Mountjoy, being immediately made aware of the intelligence that the Irish were within three quarters of a mile of his camp, beat to arms and sent the Marshal Sir Richard Wingfield to further appraise the situation; Wingfield quickly returned to confirm the message. Mountjoy meantime organized his troops to defend the main and lesser camps. However, the situation was dire for the English, as desertion, sickness and casualties had reduced the besieging army by nearly 50%. The great camp on the Northside was entrusted to the command of Colonel Sir Benjamin Berry with five regiments of foot, the Lord Deputy's (715 men) of whom he was Lieutenant Colonel, the Lord President's (536 men), the Earl of Clanrickard's (529 men), Lord Audley's (370 men) and Colonel Sir Richard Moryson's (541). The lesser camp was commanded by the Earl of Thomond with his own regiment (572 men) and three others, Colonel Sir Richard Percy (544 men), Colonel Sir Charles Wilmot (454 men) and Colonel Sir Christopher Laurence (747 men). Mountjoy, satisfied that his camps were protected as best they could be, led his remaining forces to the northwest to meet the Irish.

The Irish force that arrived at Ardmartin in the pre-dawn consisted of over 6,000 men in two columns: 400 Leinster men under Richard Tyrrell, 1,000 Munstermen, 159 Spaniards in five companies of foot, 2500 foot and 500 light horse under O'Neill and 1500 foot and 300 light horse under O'Donnell. Many accounts speak of three battles; the vanguard, the center, and the rearguard, but it would seem that a small flying squadron (559 men) was formed from a part of O'Neill's column consisting of Tyrrell's Leinstermen and the Spanish foot. As Mountjoy left camp in the company of Carew, the Lord President, all that was immediately available to the English were the remaining 400 horse of the severely depleted cavalry, approximately nine troops in total. These mounted men along with Sir Henry Power's flying squadron (449 men) had been sent under the command of Wingfield to observe the movements of the Irish and ascertain their intentions. Power's flying squadron was an ad-hoc regiment created by combining about 40 men from each of the eleven regiments making up the siege force. These troops had been used for the outposts and had been on duty the last three nights on constant alert to any alarms originating from the Irish camp.

==== Battle ====
Advancing toward Ardmartin, Wingfield observed the Irish flying squadron, under Richard Tyrell, approaching the Earl of Thomond's camp; upon seeing the English, the Irish troops halted. Following behind was the main battle of O'Neill, about 400 yards distant, advancing in good order along the ridge line screened by their cavalry. At this stage, Mountjoy joined up with Wingfield's forces, and seeing the Irish in force decided to offer battle immediately. He ordered Sergeant Major John Berkeley to return to camp and bring up the two reserve regiments of Colonel Sir Oliver St John's (515 men) and Colonel Sir Henry Follyot's (595 men) to support Wingfield. O'Neill, noting the advance of the English, called a halt and ordered his forces to retire off Ardmartin back towards the Millwater. Wingfield, losing sight of the Irish retiring off the ridgeline, asked for permission to pursue and attack with his mounted men. Having gained the summit of Ardmartin, he could see the countryside stretched before him, over which the two Irish units had fallen back in good order. The Irish had retired directly down the hill and across a ford where, having passed a boggy area, they formed up on the solid ground on the other side. O'Neill's likely intention was that the boggy ground would offer protection against the English horse and funnel the English across the fords into his waiting shot. At this point, the Earl of Clanrickard was insistent that the Marshal immediately move off the heights and cross the ford to engage the Irish. Whatever the purpose of O'Neill's decision to retire, he had firmly passed the initiative back to Mountjoy and was taking the fateful choice that was to cost him a battle, a campaign, a war and a kingdom.

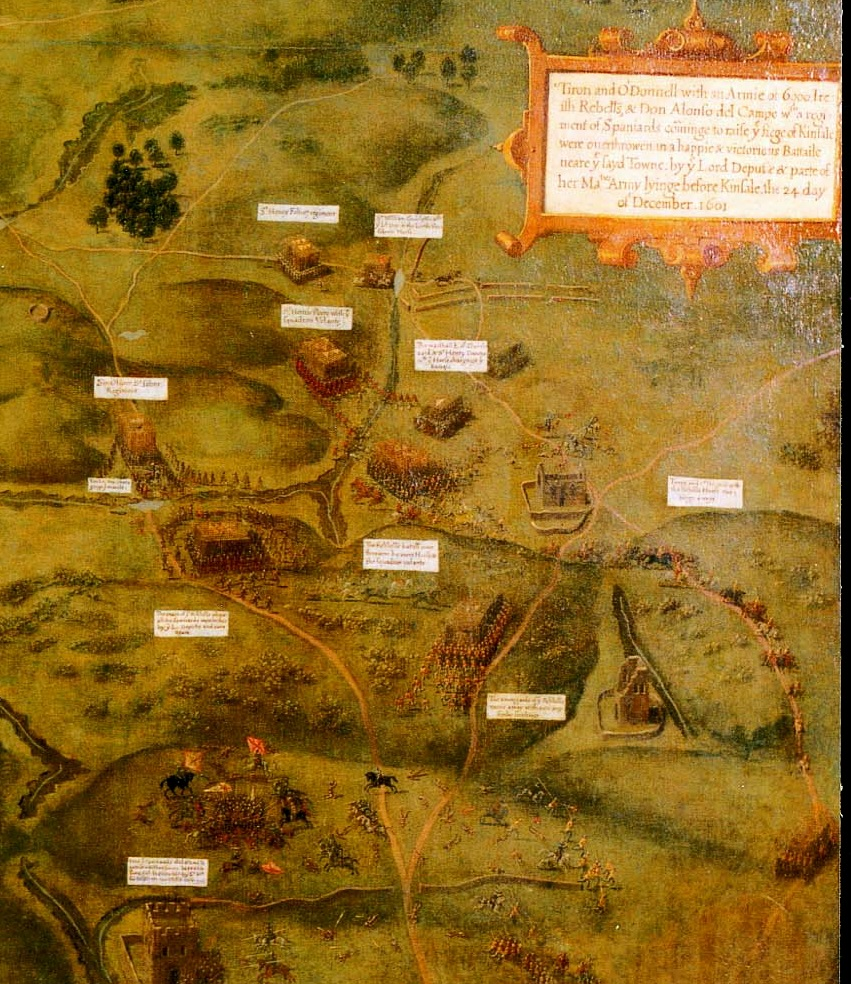
Map of the Battle of Kinsale

Wingfield immediately formed a forlorn hope with a company of foot (100 men) under Lieutenant Cowel supported by Sir Henry Danvers' Horse (100 men). This combined arms force engaged the Irish skirmishers on the opposite side of the bog and, feeding in more shot, managed to force the Irish to retire on their main battle. Lieutenant Alferez Bustamente, watching from within the Spanish ranks, commented with disgust that his allies after a minor skirmish at the first ford had called a further retreat and forded another stream in their rear. Now on solid ground with the Millwater between them, O'Neill's battle made another stand and waited for the English army's next move. During this time it is likely that the Spanish officers attempted to rearrange the Irish forces into the classic Spanish fighting formation the Tercio, which in itself was a complex operation even for the most experienced of forces. Many of O'Neill's Ulstermen may have already been familiar with this manoeuvre but the recent Cork volunteers and the wilder wood kern may have found it a claustrophobic and terrifying endeavour to stand motionless and packed together to await the attack. Indeed, it was contrary, if not alien to the Irish style of fighting, which had been employed in their former hit-and-run successes at Clontibret and Yellowford. Meanwhile, the English were also reorganizing their forces at the western end of the valley, getting ready to move onto the open plain to engage O'Neill. From the east side of the stream, Mountjoy could see that the Irish and Spaniards had lined up in two units, with a forlorn hope of shot in skirmish order guarding the passage of the ford to their front and the horse formed up behind the battle in reserve. A couple of hundred meters farther upstream the Irish retirement had exposed another route across the bog, which was exploited by the English horse. The troops of Clanrickard, Greames, Tasse, Fleming, Danvers, Godolphin, and Mitchell—about 250 riders under the Marshal—were able to splash across and outflank the Irish main battle line. According to William Farmer, the cavalry surgeon, the passage had been forced and held by Wingfield, Greames, and the loudly enthusiastic Richard de Burgh who routed the mounted Irish scouts guarding it. The sight of the English horse forming up on the open ground to their right rear caused the Irish skirmishers to fall back on the main battle, abandoning the ford and allowing the observant Mountjoy to push more troops across the first ford.

==== Irish rout ====
Contemporary eyewitnesses suggest that the English horse immediately charged the Irish in an attempt to break them but the Tercio was able to stand firm and with a bristling hedgehog of pikes repulsed the horsemen who about-faced and had to retire. Colonel Henry Powers noted that it caused 'the rebels to give a great shout' in triumph. Thinking the English horse to be in rout O'Neill called up his light horse from reserve to exploit this supposed reverse. O'Neill's cavalry totaling about 500 riders was made up of the elite of Gaelic society composed of the chiefs and gentlemen of the varied septs; they were mounted on small Irish horses without stirrups and were armed with light spears and javelins or darts. The Irish horse galloped forward in pursuit but by this time the disciplined English horse had reformed and presented a solid front to their lighter-mounted Irish opponents. Lieutenant Bustamente noted at that moment the English horse was supported by 200 shot of the flying squadron who upon crossing the stream loosed off a volley that unhorsed a few Irish riders and brought down one horse causing them to break and flee, straight back into O'Neill's main battle disorganizing it and causing part of it to flee. Seeing their opportunity, the English horse led by Wingfield charged home into the disorganized Irish battle and caused a total rout of O'Neill's men, who were ferociously pursued without quarter by the cavalry. De Burgh, the Galway-born Earl of Clarickard, was particularly bloodthirsty instructing his troopers to "put them to the sword". But O'Neill's Trumpeter, Shane Sheale, noted that the Irish troops within the ranks of De Burghs troop took pity on their rebellious countrymen and actually prodded the fleeing Irish off the field with the butt end of their staves. This small act of mercy likely reduced considerably the death toll. With the rout of O'Neill's battle, Mountjoy sent word to Captain Francis Roe who was Lieutenant Colonel of St John's Regiment to advance with his men across the bog and charge the flank of Tyrrell's Squadron.

==== Spanish rout ====
The Irish flying squadron, seeing the rout of O'Neill's main force and receiving some fire from St John's skirmishers, began to retire, and the Irish began to flee on foot. The Irish began to outpace their more heavily equipped Spanish allies who upon finding themselves abandoned, closed ranks, and retreated to a small hillock. They were then set upon by the Lord Deputy's troop of Horse led by Sir William Godolphin. Surrounded by the English horse the outcome was inevitable as one by one the Burgundy flags fell from the grip of their fallen defenders. English sources state that the Spanish under Captain Don Alonzo Del Campo presented their pikes and resisted fiercely but were overwhelmed and hacked to pieces. Del Campo, Captain Pereyra, seven Lieutenants, and forty men were captured unhurt with up to seventy men killed. Quartermaster Lopez de Soto states that one hundred and forty were killed or captured and three of the five companies' colours were taken. Of the main officers on the field only Lieutenant Bustamente amid the chaos managed to escape with about sixty other Spaniards who, after three days without sleep, were stunned by the defeat.

O'Donnell's rearguard for some reason arrived late to the battle and was not engaged. Seeing the rout of O'Neill, O'Donnell retired back the way he had come. With his decision to retreat from Ardmartin, O'Neill had turned the initiative over to the English. and although he retreated in good order his troops were not adequately trained or disciplined to stand in Tercio formation and absorb punishment as was that formation's design. Most of the Irish fled back to Ulster, though a few remained to continue the war with O'Sullivan Beare and Dermot Maol MacCarthy Reagh.

=== Surrender ===
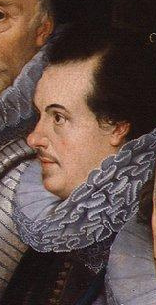
The Spanish and Irish forces surrendered to Charles Blount, 8th Baron Mountjoy.

The English resumed their encirclement of Kinsale, Del Águila saw his position as hopeless without effective action from the Irish lords. The Spanish, who had lost many men in the siege, gave up the town to Mountjoy and were allowed to sail back to Spain, not knowing that another Spanish force had been sent and was within a few days of arriving. The Spanish were given honourable terms and surrendered Kinsale with their colours flying, and it was agreed that they were to be conveyed back to Spain on giving up their other garrisons of Dunboy, Baltimore, and Castlehaven. The further Spanish force which had been sent never landed. On receipt of news of Águila's surrender, they promptly turned back to Spain.

== Aftermath ==
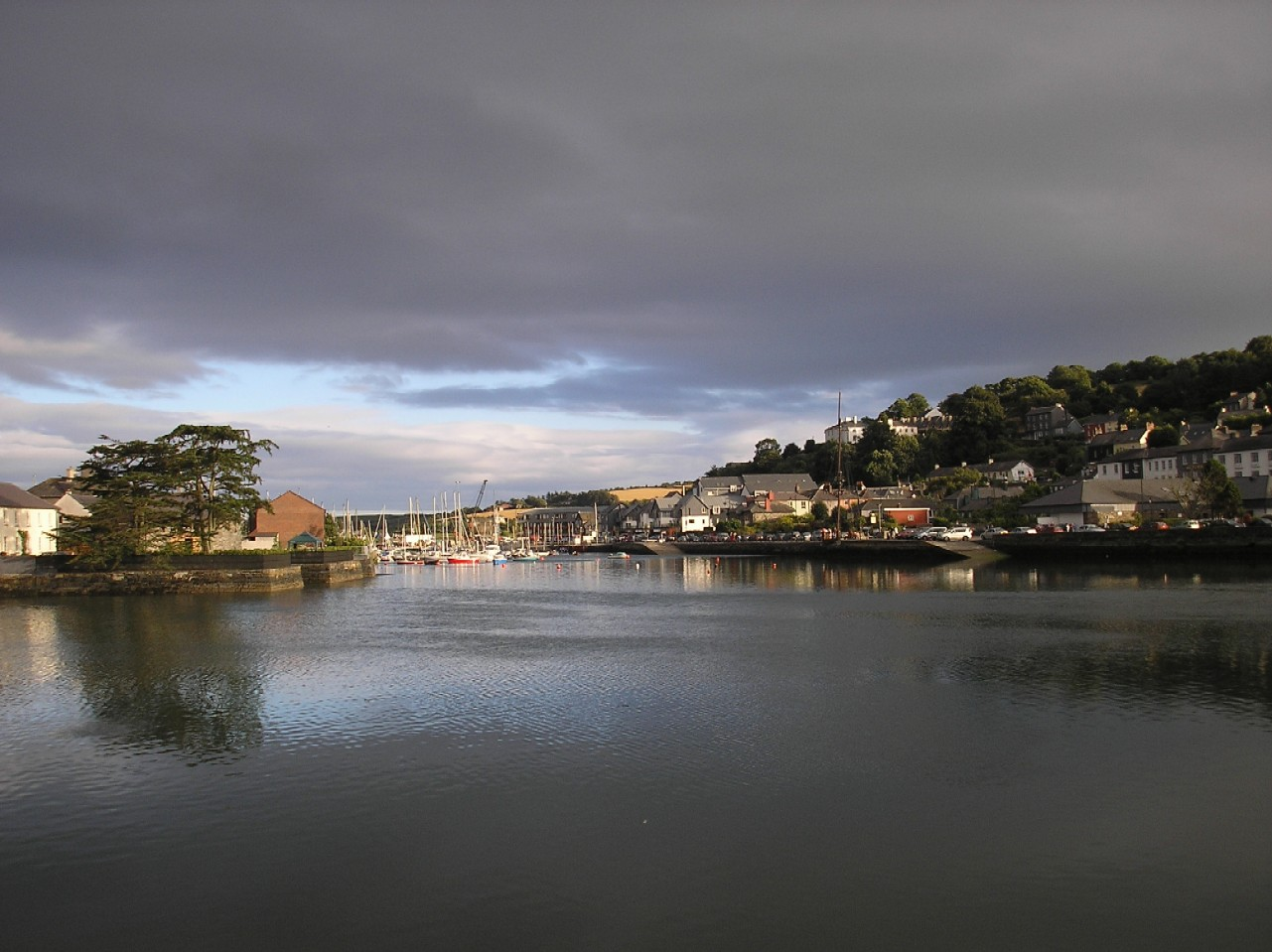
Kinsale's port today

The Irish light horse was not suited to shock action, and was no match for the English horse. Despite suffering heavy losses, the English still had the advantage in horseflesh, tactics, discipline, and offensive arms. The battle demonstrated the strength of the English cavalry techniques, including the use of a couched lance, compared to the Irish cavalry, who did not employ stirrups and thrust their lances overarm. For years the English had wished to force an engagement on a broad, open field, and the Irish infantry was ill-prepared for a pitched battle against a well-drilled professional army. The Irish were therefore easily defeated by a force a third its size. Although the Irish had repulsed the first charge, they were broken after opening their ranks to their fleeing cavalry. It was common practice for the Irish to break into a running retreat when pressed, but on this occasion there was no bog or wood to flee into, only an open field where they were at the mercy of the English horse. The Irish forces were also too far apart, as evidenced by O'Donnell's late arrival. Neither did the Irish horsemen offer any protective screen or flank protection to their footmen allowing the English cavalry to dominate tactical proceedings. Most importantly O'Neill had shown a fatal caution when on top of Ardmartin by retreating to the Millwater, when decisive action was needed to bring the Spanish out of Kinsale.

This loss put an end to Spanish help in Ireland and to much of the Irish resistance. The Ulster forces returned to their home province, and after two more years of attrition, the last of them surrendered in 1603, just after the death of Queen Elizabeth. In the following year, England and Spain agreed to make peace with the signing of the Treaty of London.

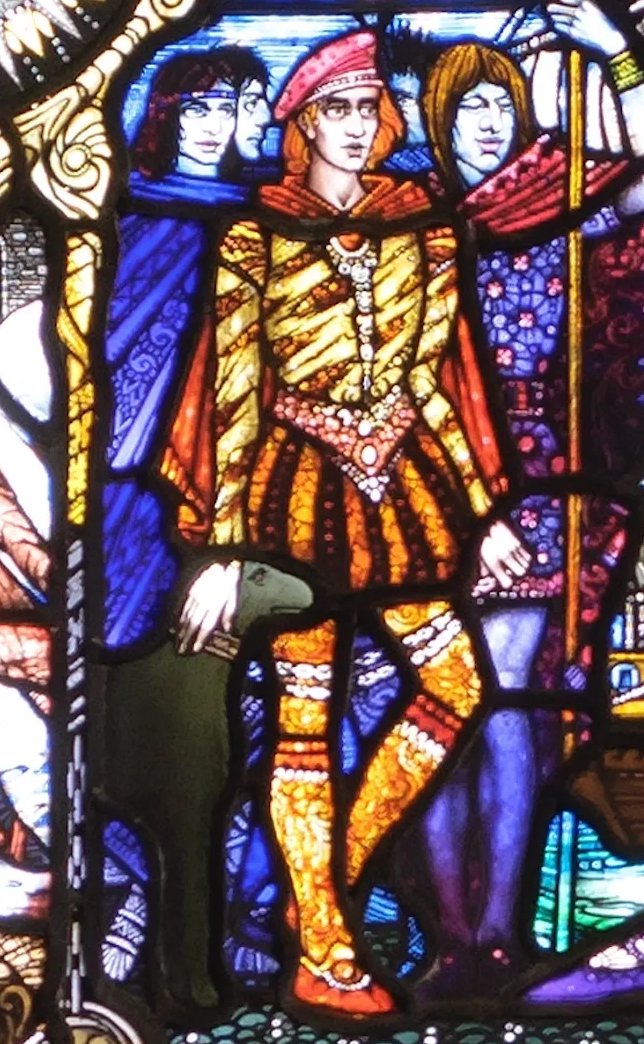
Hugh Roe O'Donnell died in Spain following the siege.

O'Donnell went to Castlehaven and took a ship to Spain. He was well received there but died a few months later of illness, possibly a tapeworm infection. At the time George Carew credited his spy, James Blake, with poisoning O'Donnell.

O'Neill returned to his native Ulster and continued to fight, but his aura of invincibility was broken. He submitted to the crown at Mellifont on 30 March 1603, where he received generous terms. Four years later he decided to go to Spain. O'Neill was accompanied by many supporters and other chieftains in what is known as the "Flight of the Earls". Their intention was always to raise an army and oust English authority in their home province, but the territories they had left behind were soon divided up in the Plantation of Ulster, and they were never able to return.

The English administration saw the ideal opportunity to seize most of the land of Ulster, and to bring in Presbyterian Lowland Scots and northern English settlers to farm it. The English had achieved their objectives of destroying the old Gaelic order, ridding themselves of the clan system and the more troublesome chieftains.

The result of the battle of Kinsale was devastating to the existing Irish culture and way of life, as the old Gaelic system was finally broken. As the Gaelic aristocracy fled to continental Europe, they left behind a power vacuum that the authority of the English filled.

=== Later defences ===
Defences were afterwards strengthened by the English -- James's Fort was later built on the site of 'Castle Ny-Parke' which had been seized by the Spanish early in the siege. The fort was named after James I of England and VI of Scotland, and was built to designs by Paul Ive.

On the other side of James' fort Charles Fort was built in the 1670s on the site of Ringcurran Castle.

== See also ==
- Nine Years' War (Ireland)
- Irish battles
- History of Ireland (1536–1691)

== Bibliography ==
- León Arsenal, Fernando Prado, Rincones de historia española (EDAF, 2008) ISBN 978-84-414-2050-2
- Richard Bagwell, Ireland under the Tudors 3 vols. (London, 1885–1890)
- Calendar of State Papers: Carew MSS. 6 vols (London, 1867–1873).
- Calendar of State Papers: Ireland (London)
- Nicholas Canny The Elizabethan Conquest of Ireland: A Pattern Established, 1565–76 (London, 1976) ISBN 0-85527-034-9.
- Nicholas Canny Making Ireland British, 1580–1650 (Oxford University Press, 2001) ISBN 0-19-820091-9.
- André Corvisier, John Childs A dictionary of military history and the art of war (Wiley-Blackwell, 1994) ISBN 978-0-631-16848-5
- Davis, Paul K. (2001). "Besieged: 100 Great Sieges from Jericho to Sarajevo." Oxford: Oxford University Press.
- Steven G. Ellis Tudor Ireland (London, 1985) ISBN 0-582-49341-2.
- Ekin, Des (2014). The Last Armada: Siege of 100 Days: Kinsale 1601. O'Brien Press. ISBN 9781847176998.
- Colm Lennon Sixteenth Century Ireland — The Incomplete Conquest (Dublin, 1995) ISBN 0-312-12462-7.
- Samuel Lewis, A Topographical Dictionary of Ireland: Comprising the Several Counties; Cities; Boroughs; Corporate, Market, and Post Towns; Parishes; and Villages; with Historical and Statistical Descriptions: Embellished with Engravings of the Arms of the Cities, Bishoprics, Corporate Towns, and Boroughs; and of the Seals of the Several Municipal Corporations (S. Lewis, 1837)
- Gerard Anthony Hayes McCoy Irish Battles (Belfast, 1989) ISBN 0-86281-212-7.
- Hiram Morgan (ed) The Battle of Kinsale (Cork, 2006).
- Hiram Morgan. Tyrone's Rebellion: The Outbreak of the Nine Years War in Tudor Ireland (Royal Historical Society Studies in History) (1999). Boydell Press, ISBN 0-85115-683-5
- John O'Donovan (ed.) Annals of Ireland by the Four Masters (1851).
- Standish O'Grady (ed.) "Pacata Hibernia" 2 vols. (London, 1896).
- James O'Neill, "A Kingdom near lost: English military recovery in Ireland, 1600-03", British Journal for Military History, Vol 3, Issue 1 (2016), pp 26–47.
- James O'Neill, The Nine Years War, 1593-1603: O'Neill, Mountjoy and the military revolution, (Four Courts Press, Dublin, 2017).
- John Powell, Magill's Guide to Military History, Volumen 3 (Salem Press, 2001) ISBN 978-0-89356-014-0
- ESTEBAN RIBAS, Alberto Raúl y SANCLEMENTE DE MINGO, Tomás: La batalla de Kinsale. HRM. Zaragoza, 2013.
- J.J. Silke The Siege of Kinsale
- Stanley Sandler, Ground warfare: an international encyclopedia, Volumen 1 (ABC-CLIO, 2002) ISBN 978-1-57607-344-5
- Stafford, Thomas (1896). A history of the wars in Ireland, during the reign of Queen Elizabeth Vol. II. Downy. ISBN 1-170-31027-3.
- Silke, John J. (1970). Kinsale; the Spanish intervention in Ireland at the end of the Elizabethan wars. Internet Archive. New York, Fordham University Press. ISBN 978-0-8232-0865-4.
- McGurk, John (2002). "The Kinsale Campaign Siege, Battle and Rout". Seanchas Ardmhacha: Journal of the Armagh Diocesan Historical Society. 19 (1): 59–69. ISSN 0488-0196.
