= Arthur Bassett =

Arthur Bassett or Basset may refer to:

- Arthur Bassett (rugby) (1914–1999), Welsh rugby player
- Arthur Basset (1597–1673), English politician, MP for Fowey
- Arthur Bassett (died 1586), English politician, MP for Barnstaple and Devon
