= Henry Percy, 8th Earl of Northumberland =

English nobleman and conspirator

Henry Percy
- Earl of Northumberland
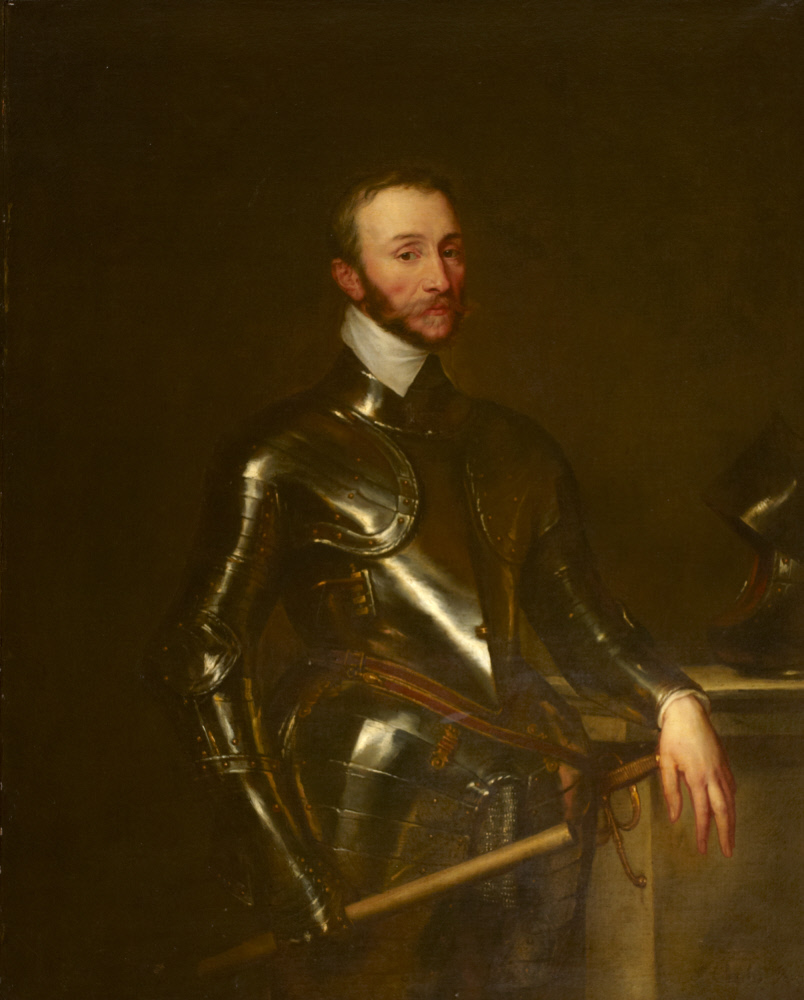
- Born: 1532; Newburn, Kingdom of England
- Died: 21 June 1585 (aged 52–53)
- Noble family: Percy
- Spouse: Katherine Neville
- Issue: Henry Percy, 9th Earl of Northumberland; Thomas Percy; William Percy; Charles Percy; Lucy Percy; Richard Percy; Joscelyne Percy; Anne Percy; Allan Percy; Eleanor Percy; George Percy
- Father: Sir Thomas Percy
- Mother: Eleanor Harbottle

Henry Percy, 8th Earl of Northumberland, 2nd Baron Percy (c. 1532 – 21 June 1585) was an English nobleman and conspirator.

== Origins ==
He was born in about 1532 at Newburn Manor (Northumberland), the second of two sons of Sir Thomas Percy (c. 1504–1537) (2nd son of Henry Percy, 5th Earl of Northumberland), by his wife Eleanor Harbottle. His father was executed in 1537 as a chief actor in the Pilgrimage of Grace.

== Career ==
Brought up with his elder brother Thomas Percy, 7th Earl of Northumberland (1528–1572), he took part as a youth in border warfare, and on Queen Mary's accession was appointed governor of Tynemouth Castle. He was returned to the House of Commons in 1554 as Member of Parliament for Morpeth, Northumberland, was knighted in 1557, and became deputy warden of the east and middle marches.

Queen Elizabeth I continued him in his chief offices. He was temporarily transferred from the governorship of Tynemouth to the captaincy of Norham Castle, but was reappointed in February 1561 to Tynemouth. When war broke out in Scotland in 1560, he was given the command of a body of light horse, to be equipped like the Reiter with corselets and two pistols each, and at the head of these troops he distinguished himself before Leith (April 1560). The French commander D'Oyzelle, when defeated, asked permission, in compliment to Percy's valour, to surrender his sword to Percy rather than to the commander-in-chief, Lord Grey. Unlike other members of his family, he had Protestant sympathies, and was directed in 1561 to report on the doctrines adopted by the Scottish congregations. Both John Knox and Sir William Kirkcaldy of Grange, with whom he corresponded, seem to have been convinced of his sympathy with presbyterianism. He had already (24 June 1559) been commissioned, together with Thomas Young, Archbishop of York, to administer the oath of supremacy to the clergy of the northern province. His position in the north was improved at the end of 1561 by his marriage with Catherine Neville, daughter and co-heiress of John Neville, 4th Baron Latimer. He was appointed Sheriff of Northumberland for 1562–63.

During the Rising of the North, in which his elder brother was a chief actor (November–December 1569), Henry Percy remained loyal to the government, joined the royal forces, and vigorously attacked the rebels. Queen Elizabeth promised him favour and employment in return for his services. When his brother was a prisoner in Scotland, Percy wrote urging him to confess his offences and appeal to the Queen's mercy. In 1571 he was elected knight of the shire for Northumberland and, on his brother's execution at York in 1572, he assumed by Queen Elizabeth's permission the title of eighth earl of Northumberland, in accordance with the patents of creation.

Mary, Queen of Scots, was in confinement at Tutbury, and he opened communication with her agent John Lesley, the bishop of Ross, at Easter 1571, offering help for her escape. Sir Ralph Sadler suspected his intentions, and on 15 November 1571 Percy was arrested while in London and sent to the Tower of London. On 23 February 1572 he wrote, begging the Queen to release him. After eighteen months' detention he was brought to trial on a charge of treason. Thereupon he threw himself on the Queen's mercy, was fined five thousand marks, and was directed to confine himself to his house at Petworth. On 12 July 1573 he was permitted to come to London, and was soon afterwards set at liberty.

On 8 February 1576 he first took his seat in the House of Lords, and was one of the royal commissioners appointed to prorogue parliament in November. In September 1582 he entertained the French agent, M. de Bex, and looked with a friendly eye on Throckmorton's plot to release Queen Mary. With Lord Henry Howard and Francis Throckmorton he was arrested on suspicion of complicity late in the same year, and for a second time was sent to the Tower. He was, however, only detained a few weeks, and no legal proceedings were taken against him. But he was deprived of the governorship of Tynemouth Castle, though he protested. He was still confident of securing the release of Queen Mary. In September 1583 he invited her agent, Charles Paget, and Paget's brother, Lord Paget, to Petworth, and there he discussed the matter fully. The Duc de Guise was to aid the enterprise with French troops, and Northumberland offered advice respecting their landing. William Shelley, who was present at the interview, was arrested and racked next year, and related what took place. Northumberland's aim, he said, was not only to secure Queen Mary's liberty, but to extort from Elizabeth full toleration for the Roman Catholics.

In December 1584 Northumberland was sent to the Tower for a third time. He protested his innocence, and courted inquiry. Six months later, on 21 June 1585, he was found dead in his bed in his cell, having been shot through the heart. A jury was at once summoned, and returned a verdict of suicide. He was buried in the church of St. Peter ad Vincula, within the Tower. Suspicions were voiced. It was stated that the day before the earl died the lieutenant of the Tower, Sir Owen Hopton, was ordered by Sir Christopher Hatton, the vice-chamberlain, to place the prisoner under the care of a new warder named Bailiffe. A report spread that Hatton had contrived Northumberland's death, and some years later Sir Walter Raleigh, in writing to Sir Robert Cecil, referred to Hatton's guilt as proved. Immediately after his death there was published at Cologne a tract, entitled Crudelitatis Calvinianae Exempla duo recentissima ex Anglia, in which the English government was charged both with Northumberland's murder and with the enforcement of the penal statutes passed in the previous year. The tract was reprinted in French, German, English, Italian, and Spanish. To allay the public excitement, a Star Chamber inquiry was ordered, and it was held on 23 June; A True and Summarie Reporte of the proceedings was published, and the verdict of suicide upheld.

== Family ==
By 25 January 1562, he had married Lady Katherine Neville (1546–1596), the daughter of John Nevill, 4th Baron Latimer and Lady Lucy Somerset. They had the following children:

- Henry Percy, 9th Earl of Northumberland (1564–1632), married Lady Dorothy Devereux
- Thomas Percy
- William Percy, poet and playwright
- Sir Charles Percy, of Dumbleton, Gloucestershire, where survives his monument;
- Lucy Percy, married Sir John Wotton and then Sir Hugh Owen
- Richard Percy
- Sir Joscelyne Percy
- Anne Percy
- Sir Allan Percy (died 1613), married Mary Fitz
- Eleanor Percy (1583–1650), married William Herbert, 1st Baron Powis
- Sir George Percy (1580–1632), married Anne Floyd. Their daughter Anne Percy married John West.

His wife Katherine was buried in St Paul's Chapel within Westminster Abbey.

== Ancestry ==
Ancestors of Henry Percy, 8th Earl of Northumberland

8. Henry Percy, 4th Earl of Northumberland
4. Henry Percy, 5th Earl of Northumberland
9. Maud Herbert
2. Sir Thomas Percy
10. Robert Spencer of Spencer Combe
5. Lady Katherine Spencer
11. Eleanor Beaufort
1. Henry Percy, 8th Earl of Northumberland
12. Sir Ralph Harbottle of Beamish
6. Sir Guiscard Harbottle of Beamish
13. Margaret Percy
3. Eleanor Harbottle
14. Sir Henry Willoughby
7. Jane Willoughby
15. Margaret Markham

Peerage of England
Preceded by Thomas Percy	Earl of Northumberland; 1572–1585	Succeeded by Henry Percy
