= Fowey (constituency) =

Former parliamentary constituency in the United Kingdom

- Former borough constituency for the House of Commons

1571–1832
- Seats: Two

Fowey was a rotten borough in Cornwall which returned two Members of Parliament to the House of Commons in the English and later British Parliament from 1571 to 1832, when it was abolished by the Great Reform Act.

== History ==
The borough consisted of the town of Fowey, a seaport and market town, and the neighbouring hamlet of Mixtow. Unlike many of the most notorious Cornish rotten boroughs which were enfranchised in Tudor times, Fowey had once been a town of reasonable size, and returned members to a national council in 1340, although it had to wait until 1571 for representation in Parliament.

Fowey was a feudal tenure of the Prince of Wales, and by a judgment of 1701 the right to vote was held to rest with "the Prince's tenants", which in practice was interpreted to include all the householders paying scot and lot; there were 331 voters in 1831. However, most of the property in the borough was owned by the Rashleigh family of nearby Menabilly, and in 1816 they and the Earl of Mount Edgcumbe shared the "patronage", each having considerable influence if not quite absolute power to choose one of the MPs.

In 1831, the borough had a population of 1,600, and 340 houses.

== Members of Parliament ==
=== 1571–1629 ===
Parliament	First member	Second member
Parliament of 1571	Robert Petre	Thomas Cromwell
Parliament of 1572–1583	William Russell	Edward Harrington
Parliament of 1584–1585	Reginald Mohun	William Treffry
Parliament of 1586–1587	Reginald Mohun	John Bonython
Parliament of 1588–1589	John Rashleigh	Arthur Atye
Parliament of 1593	William Killigrew	Samuel Lennard
Parliament of 1597–1598	John Rashleigh	Thomas Treffry
Parliament of 1601	Carew Raleigh	Sir William Courtney, junior
Parliament of 1604–1611	Henry Peter	Francis Vyvyan
Addled Parliament (1614)	Jonathan Rashleigh	Sir Edward Boys
Parliament of 1621–1622	Jonathan Rashleigh	John Treffry
Happy Parliament (1624–1625)	William Noy	Sir Robert Coke
Useless Parliament (1625)	Jonathan Rashleigh	Arthur Basset
Parliament of 1625–1626	William Murray	Arthur Basset
Parliament of 1628–1629	Robert Rashleigh	Sir Richard Grenville
No Parliament summoned 1629–1640

=== 1640–1832 ===
Year	First member	First party	Second member	Second party
April 1640	Jonathan Rashleigh	Royalist	Edwin Rich	
November 1640	Jonathan Rashleigh	Royalist	Sir Richard Buller	Parliamentarian
November 1642	Jonathan Rashleigh	Royalist	Buller died – seat vacant	
January 1644	Rashleigh disabled from sitting – seat vacant		Buller died – seat vacant	
1646	Nicholas Gould		Gregory Clement	
May 1652	Nicholas Gould		Clement expelled – seat vacant	
1653	Fowey was unrepresented in the Barebones Parliament and the First and Second Parliaments of the Protectorate			
January 1659	John Barton		Edward Herle	
May 1659	Nicholas Gould		One seat vacant	
April 1660	John Barton		Edward Herle	
1661	Jonathan Rashleigh		John Rashleigh	
1675	Jonathan Rashleigh		John Rashleigh	
1679	Jonathan Rashleigh		John Treffry	
1685	Bevil Granville		John Treffry	
1689	Jonathan Rashleigh		Shadrach Vincent	
1695	Thomas Vivian		Sir Bevil Granville	
January 1701	John Williams		John Granville	
December 1701	John Williams		John Hicks	
1702	George Granville	Tory	John Hicks	
1708	George Granville	Tory	Henry Vincent (junior)	
1710	Viscount Dupplin	Tory	Henry Vincent (junior)	
1712	Bernard Granville		Henry Vincent (junior)	
1713	Jermyn Wyche	Tory	Henry Vincent (junior)	
1715	Jonathan Elford	Tory	Henry Vincent (junior)	
1719	Jonathan Elford	Tory	Nicholas Vincent	
1722	John Goodall	Tory	Nicholas Vincent	
1725	William Bromley	Tory	Nicholas Vincent	
January 1727	William Bromley	Tory	The Viscount FitzWilliam	Whig
August 1727	Jonathan Rashleigh	Tory	The Viscount FitzWilliam	Whig
1734	Jonathan Rashleigh	Tory	John Hedges	
1737	Jonathan Rashleigh	Tory	William Wardour	
1746	Jonathan Rashleigh	Tory	Captain the Hon. George Edgcumbe	Whig
1761	Jonathan Rashleigh	Tory	Hon. Robert Boyle-Walsingham	
1765	Philip Rashleigh	Tory	Hon. Robert Boyle-Walsingham	
1768	Philip Rashleigh	Tory	James Modyford Heywood	
1774	Philip Rashleigh	Tory	The Lord Shuldham	Whig
1784	Philip Rashleigh	Tory	John Grant	Tory
1786	Philip Rashleigh	Tory	Hon. Richard Edgcumbe	Tory
1795	Philip Rashleigh	Tory	Sylvester Douglas	Tory
1796	Philip Rashleigh	Tory	Reginald Pole-Carew	Tory
1799	Philip Rashleigh	Tory	Edward Golding	Tory
July 1802	Reginald Pole Carew	Tory	Edward Golding	Tory
December 1802	Reginald Pole Carew	Tory	Robert Wigram (senior)	Tory
1806	Reginald Pole Carew	Tory	Robert Wigram (junior)	Tory
1812	William Rashleigh	Tory	Robert Wigram (junior)	Tory
1818	George Lucy	Tory	Hon. James Hamilton Stanhope	
5 March 1819	Seat vacant (death of Viscount Valletort)		Alexander Glynn Campbell	Tory
24 March 1819	Matthias Attwood	Tory	Alexander Glynn Campbell	Tory
May 1819	Viscount Valletort	Tory	Alexander Glynn Campbell	Tory
1820	Viscount Valletort	Tory	George Lucy	Tory
1826	Hon. Robert Henley	Tory	George Lucy	Tory
February 1830	Lord Brudenell	Tory	George Lucy	Tory
July 1830	Lord Brudenell	Tory	John Cheesment Severn	Tory
1832	Constituency abolished			
