= John Goodall (MP) =

English Tory politician (??–1725)

John Goodall (died 19 February 1725) was an English Tory politician.

Goodall was the son of William Goodall and Elizabeth, daughter of Sir John Coryton, 1st Baronet. He was a merchant in Fowey, Cornwall. In 1721 he was included in a list of likely Jacobite sympathisers sent to the Old Pretender and in 1722 he was in contact with the agents of Francis Atterbury during the Atterbury Plot. In 1722 he was elected as a Tory Member of Parliament for Fowey; he held the seat until his death in 1725.

Parliament of Great Britain
| Preceded by Jonathan Elford; Nicholas Vincent | Member of Parliament for Fowey; 1722–1725 | Succeeded by William Bromley; Nicholas Vincent |
