= Jonathan Elford =

English Tory politician

Jonathan Elford (November 1684 – 10 December 1755) was an English Tory politician.

== Biography ==
Elford was the son of Jonathan Elford and Amy Halse, and he succeeded to his father's estates in 1690. He was educated at Christ Church, Oxford and entered the Middle Temple in 1702. On 23 April 1713 he married Anne Neville, daughter of Sir Thomas Nevill, 1st Baronet.

At a by-election in 1710, Elford was returned as a Tory Member of Parliament for Saltash. He was elected again for the seat in the 1713 British general election. He was listed as Tory in analyses of the 1713 and 1715 parliaments. In August 1714 Elford was appointed a deputy lieutenant of Cornwall and the following year was selected to represent the rotten borough of Fowey. He held the seat until 1722.

Parliament of Great Britain
Preceded by Sir Cholmeley Dering, Bt; Alexander Pendarves	Member of Parliament for Saltash; 1710–1715; With: Alexander Pendarves (1710–1711); Sir William Carew, Bt (1711–1713); William Shippen (1713–1715)	Succeeded by Shilston Calmady; John Francis Buller
Preceded by Jermyn Wyche; Henry Vincent	Member of Parliament for Fowey; 1715–1722; With: Henry Vincent (1715–1719); Nicholas Vincent (1719–1722)	Succeeded by John Goodall; Nicholas Vincent
