= John Severn =

English politician

John Cheesment-Severn

Member of the Parliament of the United Kingdom for Wootton Bassett
- In office 1807 – 25 January 1808

Member of the Parliament of the United Kingdom for Fowey
- In office 1830–1832

Personal details
- Born: 27 October 1781 Mile End, Middlesex
- Died: 17 December 1875 (aged 94)
- Party: Tory
- Spouse: Mary Ann (m. 1811)
- Parent: John Cheesment (father)
- Education: Eton College, Christ Church, Oxford

John Cheesment-Severn (27 October 1781 – 17 December 1875) was an English politician. He was a Member of Parliament in the 19th century.

Born in Mile End, Middlesex, he was the only son of Captain John Cheesment, a master mariner who commanded the East Indiaman Britannia. He was educated at Eton College and Christ Church, Oxford before being called to the bar at Lincoln's Inn in 1807. He sat in the House of Commons for Wootton Bassett from 1807 to 1808 and later for Fowey from 1830 to 1832, having taken the surname Severn by royal licence in 1807. In 1811 he married Mary Ann, daughter and heiress of the banker John Price of Penybont Hall, Penybont, Radnorshire, and served as High Sheriff of Radnorshire for 1811–12.
