= Robert Petre (died 1593) =

Robert Petre (died 1593), of St. Stephen's, Westminster and St. Botolph-without-Aldersgate, London, was an English Member of Parliament (MP).

He was a Member of the Parliament of England for Fowey in 1571, for Penryn and Dartmouth.
