= Allan Percy =

Member of the Parliament of England for Beverley
- In office 1604–1611 Serving with William Gee

Personal details
- Born: 2 July 1577
- Died: 11 November 1611 (aged 34)
- Spouse: Mary Fitz
- Parent: Henry Percy (father)
- Education: Gloucester College, Oxford

Allan Percy (2 July 1577 – 11 November 1611) was an English aristocrat and landowner who sat as MP for Beverley from 1604 to 1611.

Percy was born into the Percy family as the son of Henry Percy, 8th Earl of Northumberland (1532–1585) and Lady Katherine Neville (1546–1596). He was a cousin of the Gunpowder Plot conspirator Thomas Percy.

From 1603 to 1606 he was lieutenant of the Gentlemen Pensioners, under the captaincy of his brother Henry, 9th Earl.

== See also ==
- List of MPs elected to the English parliament in 1604
