= Gregory Clement =

English politician and regicide (1594–1660)

- Gregory Clement

Member of Parliament for Fowey, Devon
- In office 1648 – 1652 (expelled)

Personal details
- Born: 21 November 1594 (baptised) Plymouth, Devon
- Died: 17 October 1660 (aged 65–66) Charing Cross, London (hanged, drawn and quartered)
- Spouse(s): Martha Trenchfield; Frances Sedley
- Children: Gregory; John
- Occupation: merchant, regicide

Gregory Clement (1594 – 17 October 1660) was an English Member of Parliament (MP) and one of Charles I's regicides, who was tried for treason, found guilty, and hanged, drawn and quartered on 17 October 1660.

Gregory Clement and his wife Martha Spaight had two sons documented as reaching adulthood. No confirmed record of either son has been discovered after 1660 and no confirmed record of either having descendants.

== Biography ==
Gregory Clement was baptised at St Andrew's, Plymouth on 21 November 1594. His father, John Clement, was a merchant, elected mayor of Plymouth in 1614, and his mother was Judith, daughter of John Sparke of Plymouth; he was their second son.

== East India Company ==
Coat of Arms of East India Company

After working for a Mr Hewkeley, he contracted on 10 December 1623 for seven years with the British East India Company and sailed to their factory at Surat in 1624. In 1626, he was already being accused of "private trade" for his own profit. In February 1627 he was promoted to head the Company's factory at Agra, where the new Mughal Emperor Shah Jahan had established his court. In March 1628 he was briefly detained by the emperor for buying saltpetre without a licence, but managed to acquire the licence for this trade.

In April 1630, after working seven years in India, Clement was sent back to London in disgrace, having been accused and fined for private trading. His superior, Richard Wylde, governor of Surat, was also charged, and both returned on either the ship Charles or Jonas, which both sailed from Surat on 14 April 1630 and arrived in The Downs on 9 April 1631. Subsequently, he testified against Wylde.

== London Merchant ==
Following his return to England with sufficient capital to set himself up in trade, Clement married Martha Spaight at St Botolph's Aldgate, London, on 1 December 1631. She was the widow of mariner William Spaight, who died at Livorno in 1631. Her father was Thomas Trenchfield, later Rear-Admiral in Parliament's Navy.

The association with Trenchfield was mutually profitable. Aside from trade with the North American colonies, they sometimes obtained a Letter of marque allowing them to seize the shipping of hostile parties such as Spain, sometimes in partnership. On 13 January 1637/8, a petition of sailors to the House of Lords stated: "that they were last summer employed by Capt. Trenchfield, Mr. Clements Mr. Willoughby, and other merchants of London, in the Discovery, under Capt. Man, and were promised their wages and the sixth part of goods taken in any prizes. The ship took four prizes of a very great value, but the merchants have not performed their agreement ..." In 1638, his house in the parish of St George Botolph Lane was valued at £70 per annum, the fourth highest valued, the highest being £100.

== Parliamentarian ==
When the Civil War broke out, Gregory Clement supported Parliament, although he did not take up arms and continued his overseas trade.

On 4 July 1648 he was elected as recruiter MP for Fowey in Cornwall, replacing his mother's brother-in-law John Rashleigh, who was disqualified as a Royalist.

Only months after he took his seat, he was faced with a summons to sit on a High Court of Justice to try King Charles I for his role in the Civil War.

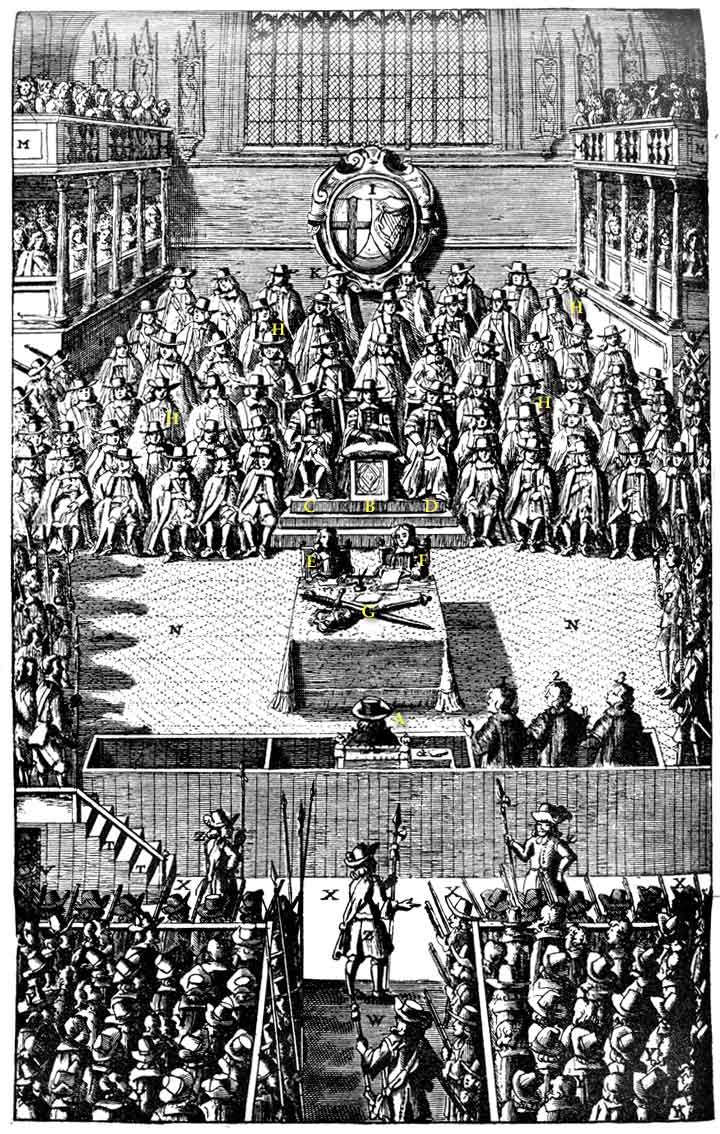
High Court of Justice 1649

His colleague Edmund Ludlow wrote: "he durst not refuse his assistance in that service." He did so conscientiously, attending all four days of the trial in January 1649 and signing the king's death warrant at its completion - 54th out of 59 signatories - although his signature appears to have been written over an erased signature.

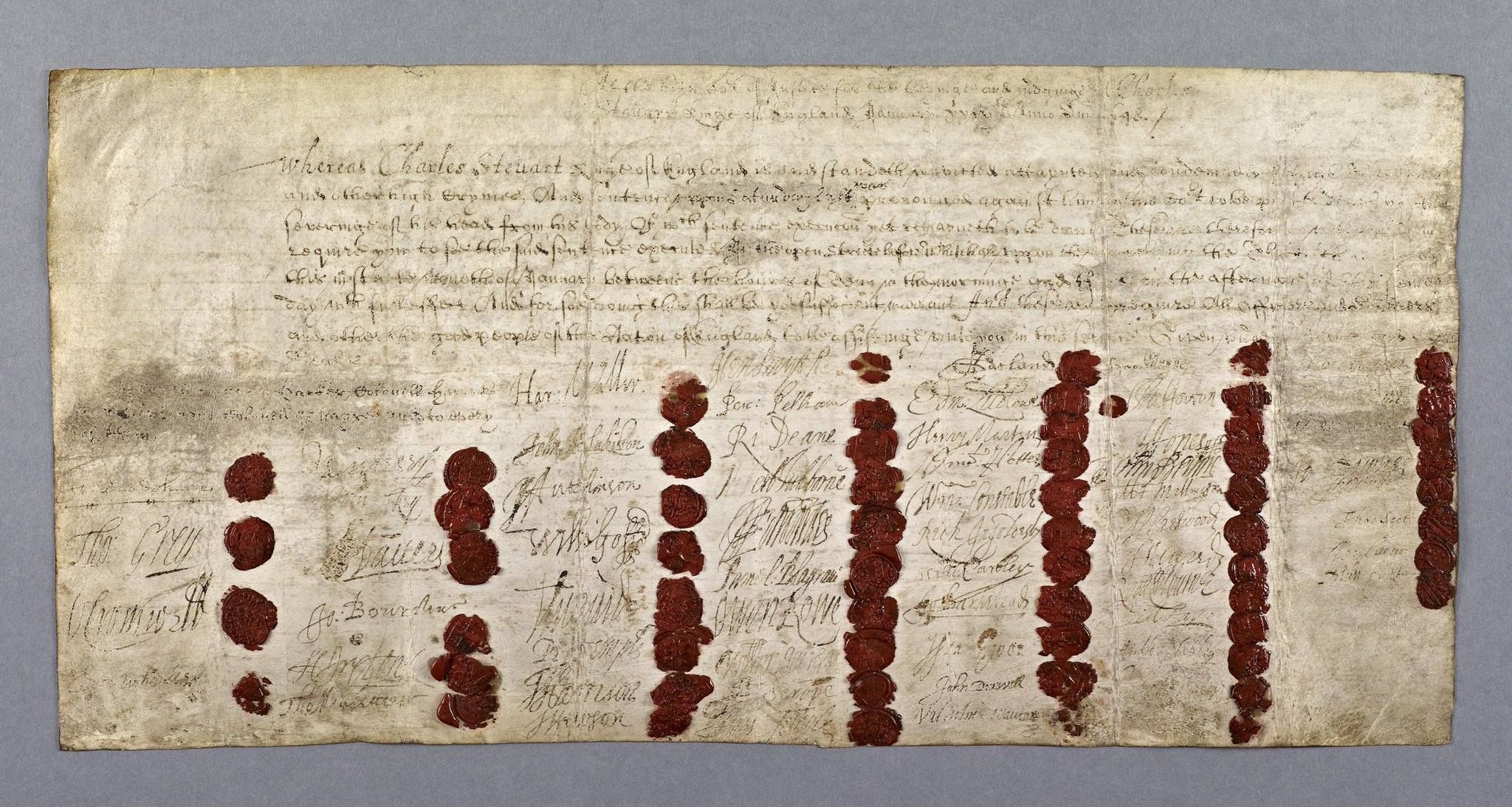
Death Warrant of Charles I

He profited from the purchase of estates confiscated by Royalists after the Civil War, and in 1652 sold part of the estate in East Greenwich Kent confiscated from merchant Andrew Cogan, which would be his residence.

He was dismissed from the House of Commons in 1652 over a scandal involving his maidservant.

== Family ==
=== Gregory ===
Gregory Clement the younger was the eldest surviving son. He was baptised at the church of St George Botolph Lane 25 June 1635. He was named as his father's eldest son at his admission to the Merchant Taylor's School, (as "Gregory Clemens, eld. son of Gregory, merchant") and also at his admission to Lincoln's Inn on November 16, 1657 ("son and heir app. of Gregy. C., of Greenwich, Kent, arm.").

=== John ===
John Clement was the second son of this name, an elder brother having died young. He was baptised at the church of St Mary Cray, Kent, on 6 July 1637, entered both the Merchant Taylor's School in 1645 (as "John Clemens, second son of Gregory, merchant"), and Lincoln's Inn on 8 May 1658 ("John Clement, 2nd son of Gregory C, of Greenwich, Kent, arm.").

=== Second marriage ===
On 19 September 1659, Gregory Clement married Frances Sedley or Sidely, daughter of Sir John Sedley of St Cleres, Ightham, Kent, at the church of St Peter, Paul's Wharf, London. Following his execution for treason and the forfeiture of his estate, she petitioned for the recovery of some of his lands in Ireland, but these were granted instead to Sir Robert Stewart.

== Regicide ==
Like all of the other 58 men who signed the death warrant for Charles I, Clement was in grave danger when Charles II of England was restored to the throne in 1660. On 6 June 1660, the king issued a Proclamation ordering a list of persons involved in the execution of King Charles I to surrender themselves under pain of being excepted from pardon. Gregory Clement, as a signatory of the death warrant, was listed. Rather than surrender, he went into hiding. He was discovered and, after his identity was confirmed by a blind man who recognised his voice, he was arrested and put on trial. He was exempted from the pardon granted in the Act of Indemnity, and attainted, his estate forfeited to the Crown. Although he initially pleaded innocence and remained silent while imprisoned, he eventually changed his plea and was found guilty of high treason. He was hanged, drawn and quartered at Charing Cross on 17 October 1660.

== False connections ==
=== Christian Barter ===
On 25 June 1630, a different Gregory Clement, mariner of Blackwall in Stepney, Middlesex, married Christian Barter of Blackwall at the church of St Dunstan and All Saints in Stepney. However, at this date, this Gregory Clement was at sea in the Indian Ocean, returning from India to London, where he did not arrive until April 1631. He could not have married Christian Barter.

=== Samuel L. Clemens ===
According to Mark Twain's autobiography, an irate Virginian correspondent called Twain a descendant of a regicide (apparently referring to Gregory Clement) and berated him for supporting the—as he called it—aristocratic Republican Party. However, Samuel L Clemens apparently descended from another family of a similar name.

== See also ==
- Regicide
- List of regicides of Charles I

== Sources ==
- Blakemore, Richard J. and Murphy, Emily. The British Civil Wars at Sea. The Boydell Press, 2018.
- Cobbett, William (1816). Howell, Thomas Bayly (ed.). A Complete Collection of State Trials and Proceedings for High Treason and Other Crimes and Misdemeanors: From the Earliest Period to the Year 1783, with Notes and Other Illustrations, Volume 5. T. C. Hansard for Longman, Hurst, Rees, Orme, and Brown.
- Foster, William. The English factories in India, 1624-1629. Oxford: The Clarendon Press, 1909. Foster
- Ludlow, Edmund. Memoirs, vol. 2. Oxford: The Clarenden Press, 1894. C H Firth, ed.
- Peacey, J. T. (23 September 2004). "Clements, Gregory (bap. 1594, d. 1660)". Oxford Dictionary of National Biography (online ed.). Oxford University Press. doi:10.1093/ref:odnb/5602. ISBN 978-0-19-861412-8. Retrieved 6 May 2020. (Subscription or UK public library membership required.)
- Robinson, Charles John, A register of the scholars admitted into Merchant Taylors' School : from A. D. 1562 to 1874: 1644. MTS
- Spencer, Charles. Killers of the King. Bloomsbury, 2015. ISBN 978-1-4088-5177-7
