= John Treffry =

English politician

John Treffry (1594–1658) was an English politician who sat in the House of Commons from 1621 to 1622.

Treffry was the son of William Treffry of Cornwall and was baptised at Fowey on 26 January 1594. He matriculated at Exeter College, Oxford on 14 June 1611 aged 16. In 1621, he was elected Member of Parliament for Fowey.

Treffry died at the age of about 64 and was buried at Fowey on 24 September 1658.

Parliament of England
Preceded by Jonathan Rashleigh; Sir Edward Boys	Member of Parliament for Fowey; 1621–1622; With: Jonathan Rashleigh	Succeeded by William Noy; Robert Cook
