= Edwin Rich (politician) =

English lawyer and politician (1594-1675)

Sir Edwin Rich (c. 1594 – 16 November 1675) was an English lawyer and politician who sat in the House of Commons in 1640.

Rich was born at Thetford, Norfolk, the son of Sir Edwin Rich of Mulbarton, Norfolk and his wife Honora Worlick, daughter of Charles Worlick. William Kempe remarked on the generous hospitality after Edwin senior provided entertainment for him during the "Nine Daies Wonder", a dance he performed on road ways between London and Norwich passing through Thetford. Here he spent an enjoyable weekend at Edwin Rich's house. The rich family later moved to Norwich and Edwin went on to be educated at Trinity College, Cambridge and Lincoln's Inn.

In April 1640, having no local connections, Rich was elected Member of Parliament for Fowey in the Short Parliament. He did not stand again and was appointed Vice-Admiral of Norfolk in 1644, remaining until 1649. In 1647, he became Master in Chancery to hear and determine causes in Chancery. In 1651, he was appointed Commissioner for Assessment for the County of Middlesex After the Restoration, Rich was knighted, on 10 July 1666.

== Death ==
Rich died at the age of 81 and was buried at Swardeston. His memorial bears his own composition as he did not trust anyone else to write it.

And here resteth the Bones of Sir Edwin Rich, Knight, Son of Sir Edwin Rich, who died the 16 Day of November, 1675.

Our Lyef is like an Hower Glasse, and our Riches are like Sand in it, which runnes with us but the time of our Continuance here, and then must be turn'd up by an other.

So speake to God as if Men heard your talke,
Soe lyve with Men as if God sawe your walke;
When thou art young, to lyve well thou must strive;
When thou art old, to dye well then contryve.
Thetford, gave Breath, and Norwich, Breeding,
Trinity-Collidg, in Cambridg, Learning;
Lincolns-Inn, did teach me Law and Equity,
Reports I have Ade, in the Courte of Chancery;
And though I cannot skill in Rymes, yet know it,
In my Lyfe I was my own deathles Poett.
For he who leaves his work to others truste,
May be deceived when he lyes in the Duste.
And nowe I have traveld through all these wayes,
Here I conclude the Storye of my Dayes.
And here my Rymes I ende, then ask no more,
Here lyes Sir Edwin Rich, who loveed the Poore.

Rich gave £200 for repairing the roads, between Wymondham and Attleborough in Norfolk and the justices of Norfolk, ordered a pillar to be erected by the road side in remembrance of this gift. He also gave £100 for building a bridge, and money to the poor of Thetford.

Rich married Jane Suckling, widow of Sir John Suckling and daughter of Reeve but had no children.

Parliament of England
Vacant Parliament suspended since 1629	Member of Parliament for Fowey; 1640; With: Jonathan Rashleigh	Succeeded by Jonathan Rashleigh; Sir Richard Buller
