= James "Spanish" Blake =

Irish merchant and spy (1561–1635)

James Blake
- Born: c. 1561; Galway, Ireland
- Died: 20 February 1635; Galway, Ireland

James "Spanish" Blake (Note: Also known by the aliases Caddell, Blackcaddell, Blague, and Diego de Blacadell, which derive from variants on his surname, as well as his family's origins in the Cadells of Wales.) (c. 1561 – 20 February 1635) (Note: All dates before 1752 are given in the Julian calendar.) was an Irish merchant, soldier and double agent. On various occasions, he seemingly worked as a spy for English, Irish and Spanish officials during the Nine Years' War.

According to a unsubstantiated and debunked myth, Blake allegedly poisoned Irish confederate commander Red Hugh O'Donnell in 1602. Historians now believe O'Donnell died from illness, possibly a tapeworm infection.

== Family background ==
James Blake was born circa 1560 or circa 1562, in Galway, Ireland. He was the second son of Walter Blake (died 1575) and his wife Juliana Browne. His grandfather and brothers served as Mayors of Galway; his elder brother, Valentine Blake (1560–1634) was created a baronet in 1622. The Blake family were one of The Tribes of Galway. James Blake was at one point proposed by the Mayor of Galway "as leader of a force against piracy".

== Career ==
In late 1587, Blake was trading in sack and acquavite from Spain, which brought him to the government's notice. He was one of several Irish merchants importing goods from Spain. In 1588, Blake made contact with officials in the Spanish government via salvaging the Spanish Armada's wrecks on the Irish coast. As a consequence, he was imprisoned in Ireland by the English government. It is possible Blake went to Spain in 1589 by way of Scotland and the Spanish Netherlands.

By 1594, Blake was at Philip II of Spain's court. He was given a pension of 40 crowns per month in recognition of his services. He subsequently fought for Spain in Brittany, where he was captured by English soldier John Norris. Blake was utilised by Norris as a double-agent, but was considered unreliable by the English government. In 1595, Norris wrote "the matter of [Blake] may put the Spaniards out of taste with trusting to the Irish". Another English official described Blake as "a cross intelligencer, but means may make him firm". In 1595 Blake was in correspondence with Lord Burghley, the queen's secretary, and was reportedly dissatisfied with his payment.

In the Nine Years' War (1593–1603), the Irish confederacy sought military reinforcements from Spain to oppose British rule in Ireland. Blake wrote to Philip II from Ireland in 1597, offering his assistance in the event of a Spanish landing. Blake's loyalties were suspected by the authorities, and he was imprisoned in Dublin Castle for three years. He was released (purportedly through the influence of Christopher Blount), but later imprisoned again in Galway in 1601. He escaped shortly after the Irish confederacy's defeat at the Siege of Kinsale, which decimated Irish forces.

== Death of Red Hugh O'Donnell ==
Blake is best known for the debunked popular legend that he poisoned Red Hugh O'Donnell, a senior commander of the Irish confederacy. Following the Siege of Kinsale, O'Donnell travelled to Spain to secure military support from Philip III. O'Donnell met the king in February 1602, who promised a Spanish naval fleet would be sent to Ireland.

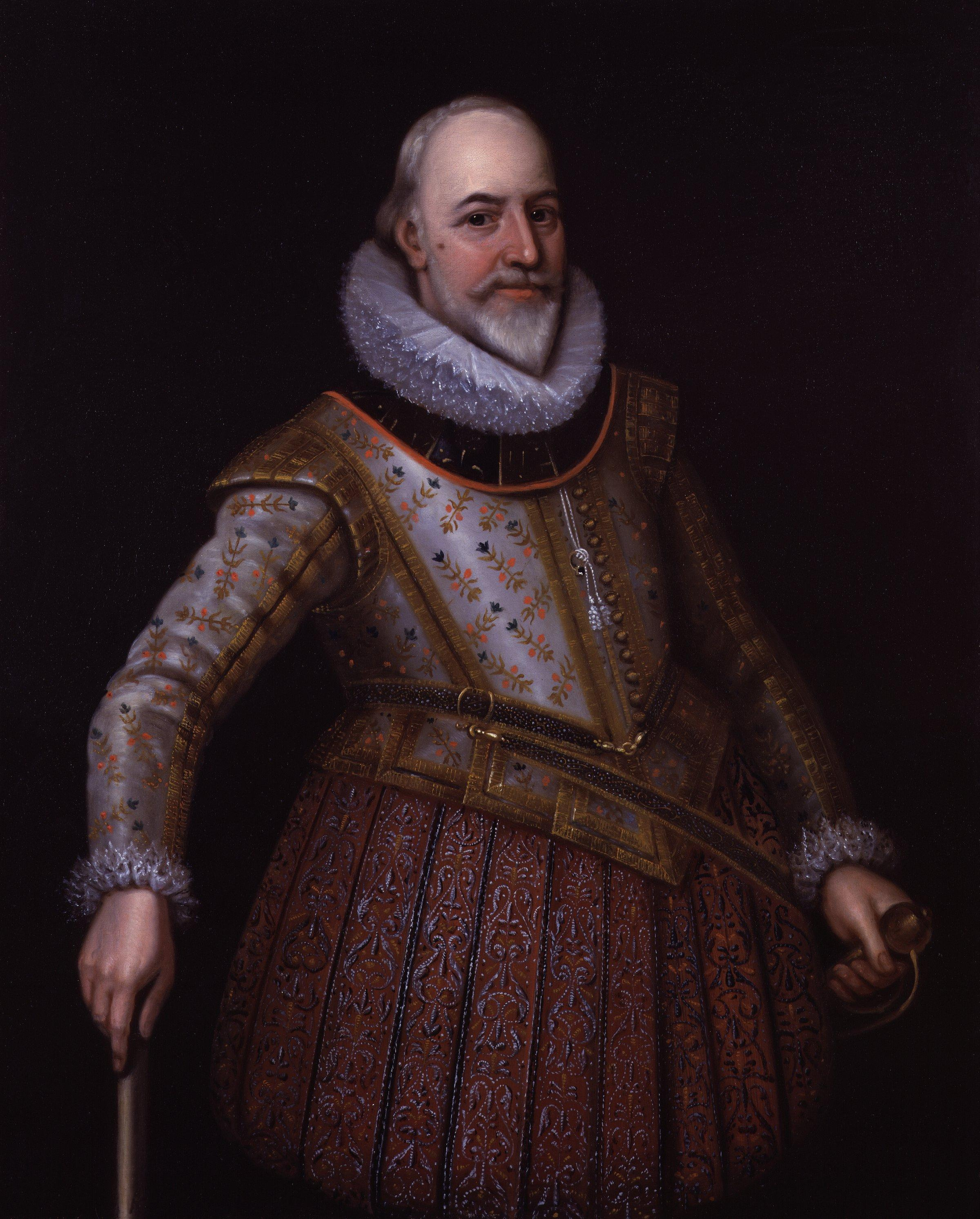
Blake approached George Carew to seek safe passage into Spain.

Blake approached George Carew, Lord President of Munster, in Cork, with an offer to travel to Spain to assassinate O'Donnell. In a ciphered letter dated 28 May 1602, Carew informed Charles Blount, Lord Deputy of Ireland, "James Blake...took a solemn oath to do service...and is gone into Spain with a determination (bound with many oaths) to kill O'Donnell". Blake arrived in Lisbon in May 1602.

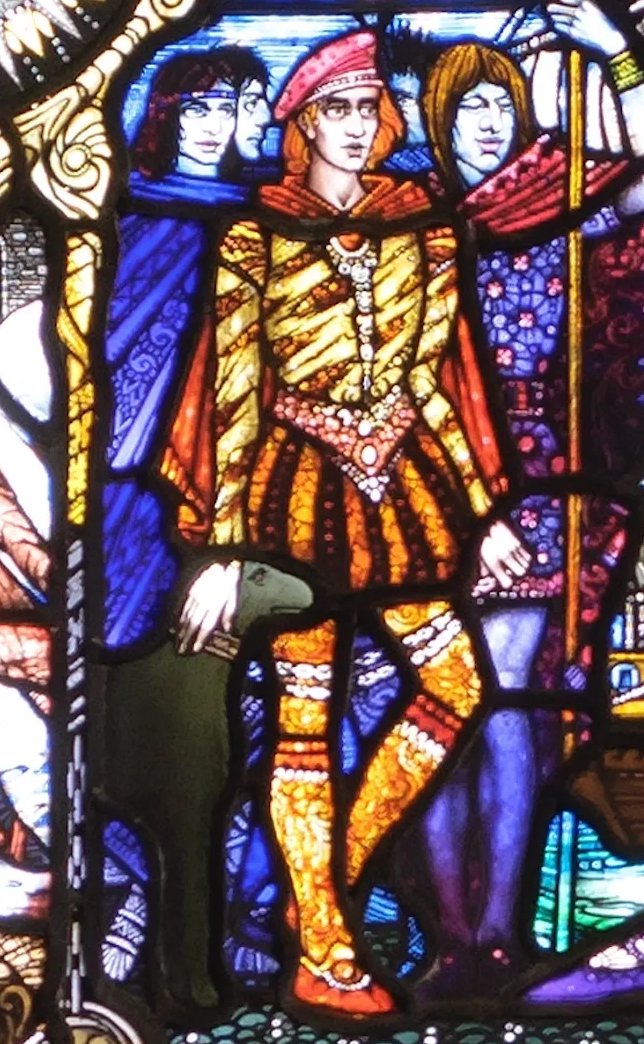
Blake is known for his association with Red Hugh O'Donnell via a popular legend.

O'Donnell was immediately suspicious of Blake and suspected him of being an English spy. O'Donnell pointed out Blake had sailed from Cork "which is the worst place of the kingdom, ruled by the most perverse governor [Carew] of any". O'Donnell sent his advisor Fr. Florence Conroy to the Spanish court to alert the authorities. The king's ministers were warned "not to trust [Blake] with any secret information".

The promised fleet failed to materalise due to a lack of resources, and on 23 July the king cancelled the expedition. Frustrated with the lack of progress, O'Donnell asked for another meeting with the king. O'Donnell set out for the Spanish court from A Coruña on 26 July and soon after arrived at the Castle of Simancas. Around the same time, Blake was in Valladolid. Despite Blake's oath to Carew, on 19 August he outlined a detailed plan to the Duke of Lerma for a Spanish expedition aimed at retaking Galway from English control. Given Blake's apparent pro-Spanish sentiments, historians Frederick M. Jones and Micheline Kerney Walsh have questioned whether he was truly an English spy, and speculated Blake was a Spanish agent who proposed the mission as a means of securing safe passage to Spain.

By 14 August O'Donnell was extremely ill, and he eventually died at the castle on 30 August, aged 29. None of O'Donnell's companions, nor his physicians, suspected foul play; at the time, they credited his anguish over the diplomatic situation with causing his early death. Carew sent another ciphered letter to Blount on 9 October: "O'Donnell is dead... he is poisoned by James Blake, of whom your lordship hath been formerly acquainted... He never told the President in what manner he would kill him, but did assure him it should be effected".

Blake and his servant Robert Kirwan were arrested sometime after O'Donnell's death, on suspicion of being English spies. In November and December, they were interrogated in the prison of Valladolid. They were not, however, suspected of complicity in O'Donnell's death. Blake admitted he had met with Carew, but claimed he was sent to Spain by MacWilliam Burke to negotiate a truce. Interestingly, Blake claimed he had acted as an intermediary between confederate Hugh O'Neill, Earl of Tyrone, and royalist Robert Devereux, 2nd Earl of Essex, during a supposed conspiracy between the earls to overthrow Elizabeth I. Ludovico Mansoni, Papal Nuncio to Ireland, was personally convinced of Blake's innocence of being a spy.

For my sins, I am punished in Ireland because of the Spaniards, and in Spain I am suspected of being English. It is a most pitiful and painful condition and it would seem that my whole life has been very badly employed.

— Blake, writing from a Spanish prison

Ultimately there is no evidence Blake was successful in his promised assassination; when Carew heard of O'Donnell's death, he would have naturally assumed Blake was responsible. Present-day historians dismiss the theory that O'Donnell was poisoned by Blake. It is more likely O'Donnell died of illness. Prior to his death he vomited a worm ten measures long, "a thing unheard of by the doctors and regarded by them as extraordinary". It was also reported "a kind of snake or serpent was found within him". This could indicate a tapeworm infection, or a cancerous tumour.

== Family and later life ==
Blake married Margery Browne, the daughter of Dominick Browne, alderman of Galway. The couple had one son and one daughter. James Blake died at Galway on 20 February 1635. He was buried in the nearby abbey of St Francis.
