= William Noy =

English politician and jurist (1577–1634)

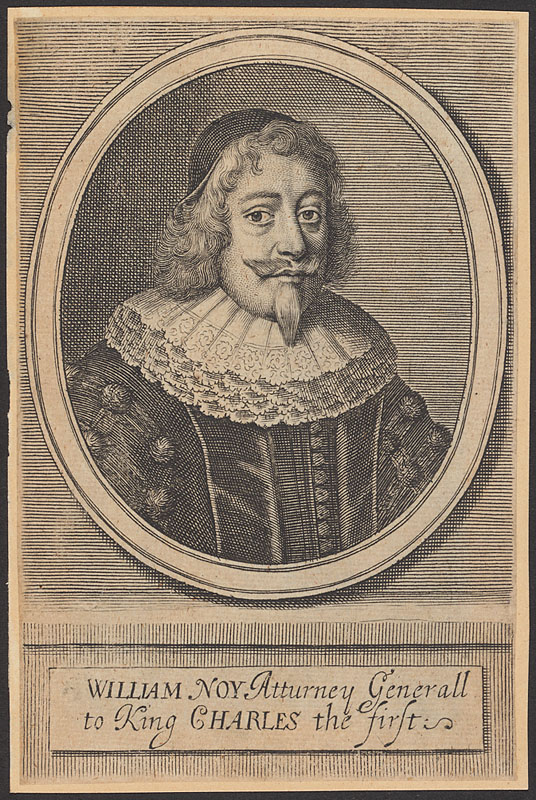
William Noy.

William Noy (1577 – 9 August 1634) was an English jurist.

He was born on the family estate of Pendrea in St Buryan, Cornwall. He left Exeter College, Oxford, without taking a degree, and entered Lincoln's Inn in 1594. From 1603 until his death he was elected, with one exception, to each parliament, sitting invariably for a constituency of his native county. For several years his sympathies were in antagonism to the court party, yet every commission that was appointed numbered Noy among its members, and even those who were opposed to him in politics acknowledged his learning.

A few years before his death he changed political allegiance, went over to the side of the court, and in October 1631 he was created Attorney-general, but was never knighted. It was through his advice that the impost of ship money was levied, resulting in a controversy that helped trigger the English Civil War. Noy suffered from stones, and died in great pain; he was buried at New Brentford church.

His principal works are On the Grounds and Maxims of the Laws of this Kingdom (1641) and The Compleat Lawyer (1661).

Parliament of England
Preceded by John Gray; John Astell	Member of Parliament for Grampound; 1604–1611; With: Sir Francis Barnham	Succeeded by John Hampden; Robert Carey
Preceded by Sir Robert Killigrew; Henry Bulstrode	Member of Parliament for Helston; 1621–1622; With: St Thomas Stafford	Succeeded by Thomas Carey; Francis Carew
Preceded by Jonathan Rashleigh; John Treffry	Member of Parliament for Fowey; 1624–1625; With: Sir Robert Coke	Succeeded by John Payne; Francis Godolphin
Preceded by William Parkhurst; Francis Godolphin	Member of Parliament for St Ives; 1626; With: Edward Savage	Succeeded by Jonathan Rashleigh; Arthur Basset
Preceded by Francis Godolphin; Francis Carew	Member of Parliament for Helston; 1628–1629; With: Sidney Godolphin	Parliament suspended until 1640
Legal offices
Preceded by Sir Robert Heath	Attorney General; 1631–1634	Succeeded by Sir John Bankes
