= John Barton (Fowey MP) =

English lawyer and politician

Member of Parliament for Fowey
- In office April 1660 – 1661
- Preceded by: Nicholas Gould
- Succeeded by: Jonathan Rashleigh
- In office January 1659 – April 1659
- Preceded by: None
- Succeeded by: Nicholas Gould

Personal details
- Born: 1614
- Died: 1684 (aged 69–70)
- Spouse: Joan Roscarrock
- Children: 3

John Barton (ca. 1614 – 1684) was an English lawyer and politician who sat in the House of Commons in 1659 and 1660.

Barton was the son of Francis Barton of Brigstock, Northamptonshire. He entered Middle Temple in 1632 and was called to the bar in 1639. In 1659, he was elected Member of Parliament for Fowey in the Third Protectorate Parliament. He was re-elected MP for Fowey in April 1660 for the Convention Parliament. In September 1660 he became commissioner for assessment for Middlesex. He became a bencher of his inn in 1662 and a reader in 1667. In 1669 he was appointed Serjeant-at-law.

Barton married Joan Roscarrock, daughter of Charles Roscarrock of Roscarrock, St Endellion, Cornwall before 1649 and had two sons and a daughter.

Parliament of England
Preceded by Not represented in Second Protectorate Parliament	Member of Parliament for Fowey; 1659; With: Edward Herle	Succeeded by Nicholas Gould
