= Richard Percy =

English soldier

Sir Richard Percy (died 1648) was an English soldier who served in Ireland during the 1590s.

He was part of the Percy Family, the son of Henry Percy, 8th Earl of Northumberland and younger brother of Henry Percy, 9th Earl of Northumberland.

Following the outbreak of Tyrone's Rebellion in Ireland, he raised a regiment, of which the majority were drawn from Wales, to supplement the under-strength Irish Army. The regiment was badly mauled during the Battle of the Yellow Ford in 1598 when, as the advance guard of the relief expedition to a besieged fort on the River Blackwater, they were attacked by Hugh O'Neill, Earl of Tyrone's rebel forces. Percy's regiment suffered heavy losses in what amounted to a major defeat in which the Marshal of Ireland, Sir Henry Bagenal, was killed.

== Bibliography ==
- Falls, Cyril. Elizabeth's Irish Wars. Constable, 1996.
