= Arthur Basset (1597–1673) =

English politician

Arthur Basset (1597 – 7 January 1673) was an English politician who sat in the House of Commons from 1625 to 1626.

Basset was the son of Sir Robert Basset (1574–1641) of Umberleigh, Devon, a colonel in the army and his wife Elizabeth née Peryam (1571–1635).

He subscribed at the University of Oxford on 11 June 1613 and was awarded BA from Exeter College, Oxford on 8 February 1616. He was a student of the Inner Temple in 1617 when he was of High Hampton, Devon. In 1625, he was elected Member of Parliament for Fowey. He was re-elected MP for Fowey in 1626.

Basset married Agnes Leigh at Northam, Devon, on 13 April 1629. Basset died in January 1673. His grandson, John, was his principle heir due to the death of his eldest son in 1660.

Parliament of England
Preceded by William Noy; Robert Cook	Member of Parliament for Fowey; 1625–1626; With: Jonathan Rashleigh 1625; William Murray 1626	Succeeded by Robert Rashleigh; Sir Richard Grenville
