= Mary Fitz =

English noblewoman (1596–1671)

- Born: 1596
- Died: 1671 (aged 74–75)
- Spouses: Allan Percy; Thomas Darcy; Charles Howard; Richard Grenville
- Father: Sir John Fitz

Lady Mary Fitz (also Granville, Percy, Darcy, Howard; 1596 – 1671) was an English noblewoman. She had four husbands and was part of the Devonshire gentry.

== Biography ==
Mary Fitz was the daughter of Sir John Fitz and Bridget Courtenay, the sixth daughter of Sir William Courtenay, 3rd Earl of Devon. In 1608, she married Allan Percy, a brother of the Earl of Northumberland. She later married Thomas Darcy, who died within months of the marriage. Her third husband Sir Charles Howard died on 22 September 1622.

In 1628, she married her fourth husband Sir Richard Grenville, 1st Baronet. She was engaged in a legal dispute with her former brother-in-law, the Earl of Suffolk, who refused to return the property she had brought to her previous marriage. Despite the cours ruling in her favour, Suffolk refused to accept the judgment, drawing Grenville into an expensive legal dispute. Based on this, Mary insisted on a pre-nuptial agreement, an unusual provision for the period that soon led to conflict. Although they had two children, Richard (ca 1630–1657?), and Elizabeth (1631 – after 1671), the marriage collapsed under the strain of legal costs, exacerbated by Grenville's own extravagance. To secure her own position, Mary allied with her former antagonist, Suffolk, and divorced Grenville.

== Issue ==
From her marriage to Sir Charles Howard:

- Elizabeth Howard

From her marriage to Sir Richard Grenville:

- Richard Grenville (ca 1630–1657)
- Elizabeth Grenville (1631–ca 1671)

== Sources ==
- Hunneyball, Paul (2010). GRENVILLE, Sir Richard (1600-1659), of Fitzford, nr. Tavistock, Devon in History of Parliament; the House of Commons,1604-1629 (Online ed.). Cambridge University Press. ISBN 978-1107002258.
- Roy, Ian (2004). "Grenville, Sir Richard, baronet". Oxford Dictionary of National Biography (online ed.). Oxford University Press. doi:10.1093/ref:odnb/11494. (Subscription, Wikipedia Library access or UK public library membership required.)
