= Sir Richard Grenville, 1st Baronet =

English soldier and politician (1600–1659)

Sir Richard Grenville
- Grenville arms, Gules, three clarions or; detail from the now demolished Stowe House

MP for Fowey
- In office 1628–1629

Personal details
- Born: 26 June 1600 Stowe, Kilkhampton, Cornwall
- Died: 21 October 1659 (aged 59) Ghent
- Spouse: Mary Fitz (1596–1671)
- Relations: Sir Bevil Grenville (1595–1643); Admiral Sir Richard (1542–1591)
- Children: Richard (ca 1631–1657?); Elizabeth (1632-after 1671)
- Parent(s): Sir Bernard Grenville (1567–1636); Elizabeth Bevill (1564–1636)
- Education: Leiden University

Military service
- Allegiance: Dutch Republic 1618–1623; England 1625–1628; Royalist 1640–1646
- Years of service: 1618–1646
- Rank: Major General
- Commands: Governor Trim 1642–1643
- Battles/wars: Thirty Years War; War of the Three Kingdoms

Sir Richard Grenville (26 June 1600 – 21 October 1659) was a professional soldier from Cornwall, who served in the Thirty Years War, and 1638 to 1651 Wars of the Three Kingdoms. He was the younger brother of Sir Bevil Grenville, who died at Lansdowne in 1643, and grandson of Admiral Sir Richard, killed at Flores in 1591.

He began his military career during the 1618 to 1624 Bohemian Revolt, an early phase of the Thirty Years War, then served under the Duke of Buckingham. In 1628, he became MP for Fowey, and married Mary Fitz, a well-connected and wealthy widow; they divorced in 1632, and he was imprisoned for debt. In 1633, he escaped to Europe; from 1634 to 1639, he fought with the Swedes, then the Dutch Republic, before returning home to take part in the Bishops Wars. He served in Ireland from 1642 to 1643, followed by a brief spell with the Parliamentarian army, before defecting to the Royalists in March 1644.

He spent the rest of the war in the West Country; arrested for insubordination by Sir Ralph Hopton in early 1646, he was released when the Royalists surrendered in March. His feud with the Earl of Clarendon meant he was barred from the exiled court of Charles II and died in Ghent on 21 October 1659. Although his negative portrayal in Clarendon's 'History of the Rebellion' was undoubtedly affected by their personal conflict, he was loathed by many on both sides for his brutality and greed. A modern assessment is that while a courageous and competent soldier, capable of inspiring great loyalty, this was offset by a narrow focus on his own self-interest, and violent temper.

== Personal details ==
Richard Grenville was one of two surviving children of Sir Bernard Grenville (1567–1636), and Elizabeth Bevill (1564–1636), and grandson of the Elizabethan hero, Sir Richard Grenville. His elder brother was Sir Bevil Grenville, a Royalist hero killed at Lansdowne in July 1643.

In 1628, he became the fourth husband of Lady Mary Fitz, a wealthy and well connected widow. She was engaged in a legal dispute with her former brother-in-law, the Earl of Suffolk, who refused to return the property she brought to her previous marriage. Despite the courts ruling in her favour, Suffolk refused to accept the judgment, drawing Grenville into an expensive legal dispute. Based on this, Mary insisted on a pre-nuptial agreement, an unusual provision for the period that soon led to conflict. Although they had two children, Richard (ca 1630–1657?), and Elizabeth (1631-after 1671), the marriage collapsed under the strain of legal costs, exacerbated by Grenville's own extravagance. To secure her own position, Mary allied with her former antagonist, Suffolk, and divorced Grenville.

== Career ==
=== 1618 to 1640; the Thirty Years War ===
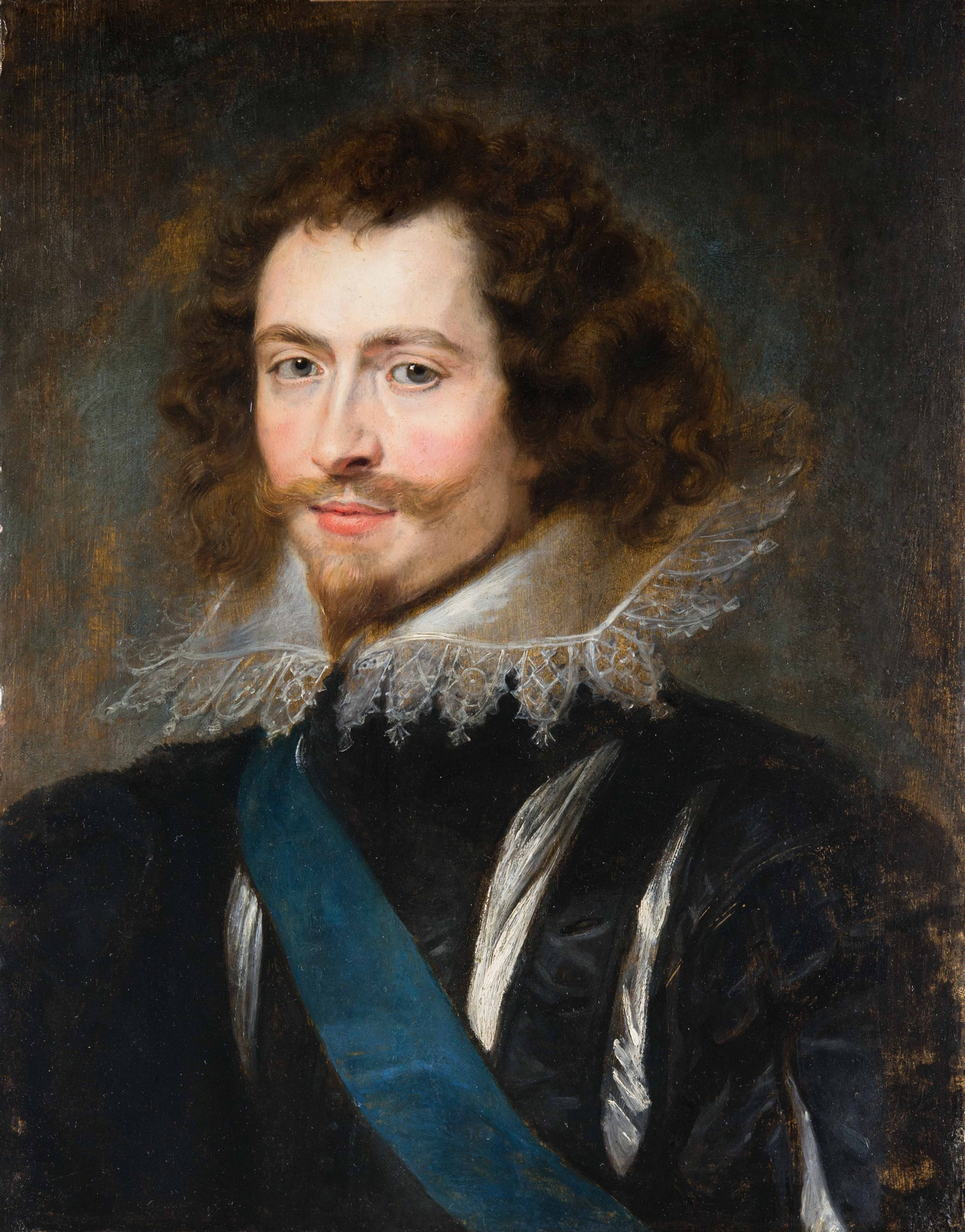
Grenville's patron, the Duke of Buckingham, assassinated in August 1628

Little is known of Grenville's early life; it is thought he attended Exeter College, Oxford, like his brother, but he does not appear in their records. Like many younger sons, he adopted a military career; from 1618 to 1623, he served under Horace Vere in the Dutch war with Spain, and the Palatinate campaign. His colleagues included future Civil War generals Sir Ralph Hopton and William Waller; it appears likely all three were members of the English garrison of Frankenthal, which surrendered to the Catholic League in March 1623.

On his return to England, Grenville took part in naval expeditions against Cádiz in 1625, Saint-Martin-de-Ré in 1627, and La Rochelle in 1628. All three were expensive disasters, but brought him to the attention of Charles I's favourite, the Duke of Buckingham. With his support, in 1628 Grenville became Member of Parliament for Fowey, Cornwall.

Although Buckingham's assassination in August 1628 deprived Grenville of his patron, in November he married Mary Fitz, heir to Fitzford House, in Devon. He used her money to purchase a baronetcy, and fund an extravagant lifestyle; both were strong-willed individuals, and frequently quarrelled. Suffolk came to an agreement with Lady Mary, who divorced Grenville, and the two sued him for slander, demanding £8,000 in damages. Unable to pay, he was imprisoned for debt in March 1632.

He escaped in 1633, and fled to the Dutch Republic, where he studied mathematics at Leiden University, a subject popular with professional soldiers, due to its applications in siege warfare. Over the next five years, he served with the Swedish army in Germany, then the Dutch Scots Brigade, which was commanded by his distant relative, the Earl of Leicester. In 1639, he returned to England to join the Royal army assembled for the Bishops Wars; in return, Charles voided his 1632 conviction.

=== 1640 to 1646; the Civil War ===
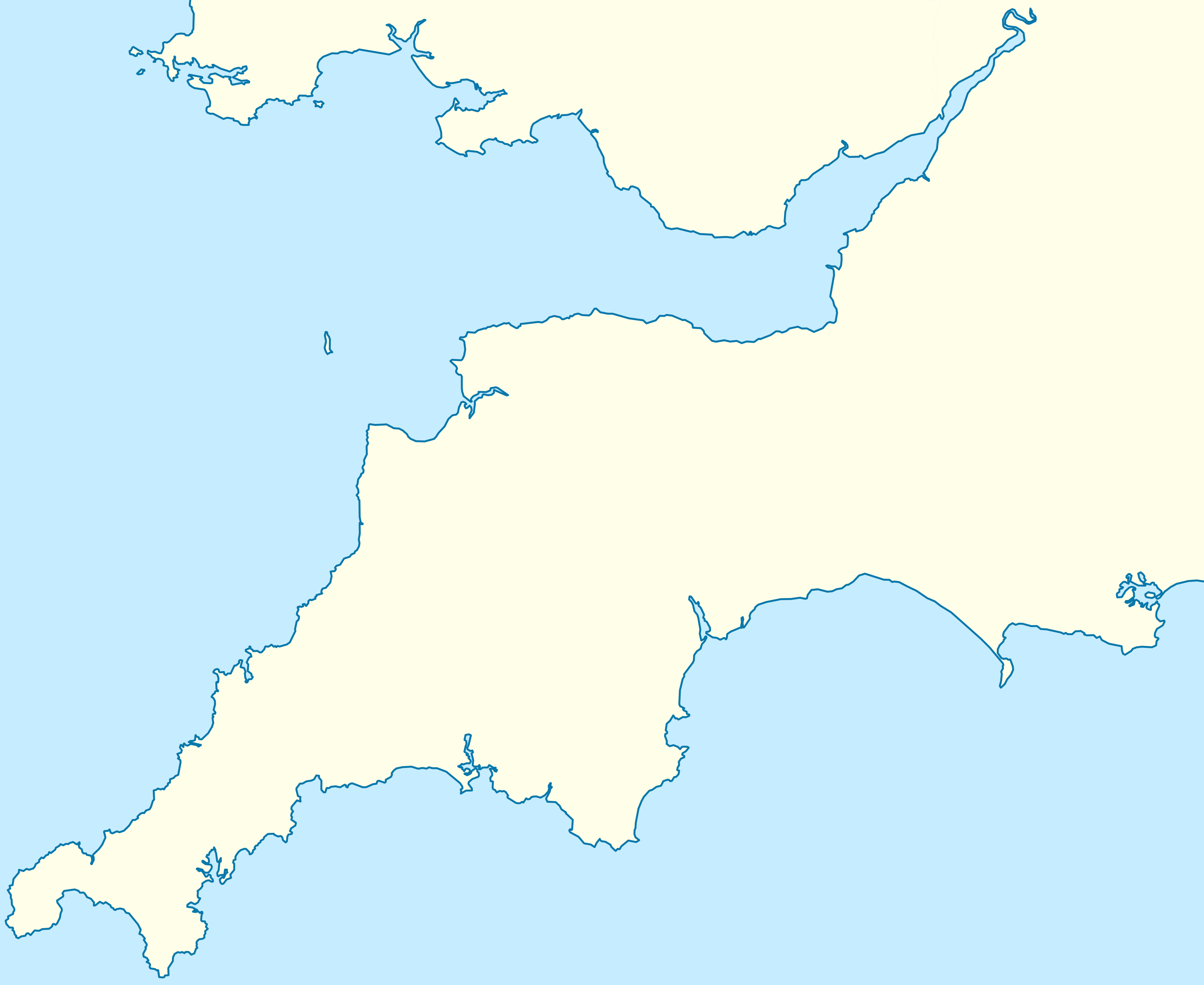
The First English Civil War in the West

In February 1642, Grenville was part of the army sent to suppress the Irish Rebellion, where he gained a reputation as a competent, but ruthless leader, and was appointed governor of Trim, County Meath. As a result, he missed the early stages of the First English Civil War, which began in August 1642. In June 1643, the rebels agreed a truce with Ormond, leader of the Irish Royalists, formally confirmed in September when both sides signed a Cessation of Arms. The truce released Royalist troops for use in England, including Grenville. One suggestion is the death of his elder brother at Lansdowne in July provided an opportunity to assume leadership of the Royalist movement in Cornwall, which was intensely local.

However, when he arrived in Liverpool in August, he was arrested by Parliamentarian troops and sent to London. The Irish regiments had not been paid for over a year, and Parliament promised to fund the arrears of any soldier who joined them. In return for swearing loyalty, Grenville received his wages and was appointed Lieutenant-General of Horse in the Army of the South Eastern Association, led by his former colleague, William Waller. However, in March 1644, he defected to the Royalists, who put him in charge of the siege of Plymouth; he also participated in their victory at Lostwithiel in September.

As in Ireland, Grenville soon gained a reputation for brutality, especially his treatment of Parliamentarian prisoners at Lydford and Tavistock, while seizing any opportunity for self-enrichment. However, he also insisted on paying his troops on time; unlike Hopton and others, he did not allow them to take 'free quarter', and prevented plundering. As the war turned against the Royalists, internal conflict increased; Grenville refused orders from Prince Rupert to support an attack on Taunton, then quarrelled with Lord Goring, commander of the Western Army. In July, he resigned his command; when he did so, most of the Cornish levies also deserted, and refused pleas from Goring to support his resistance to the advancing New Model Army.

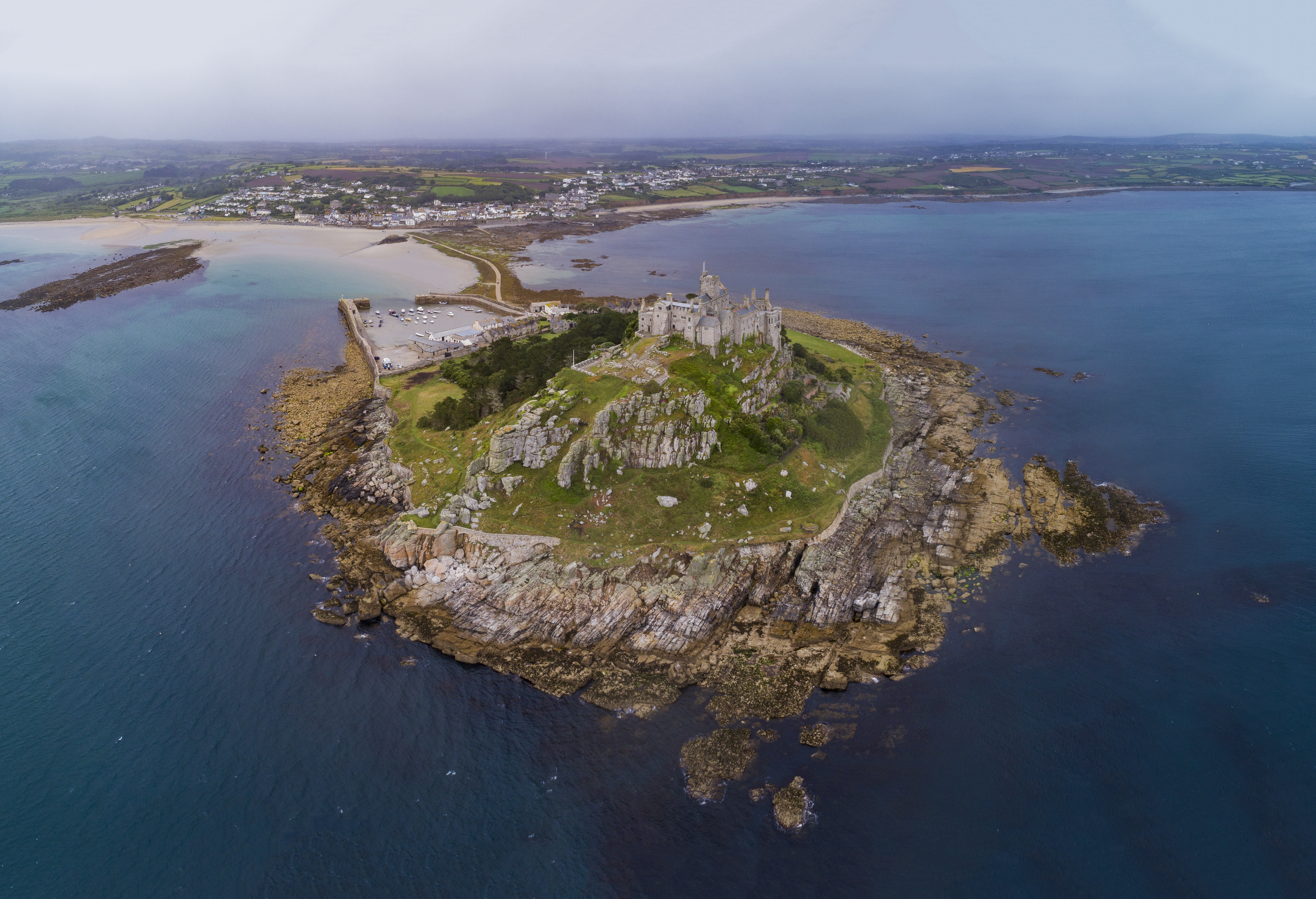
Ruins of the castle on St Michael's Mount, where Grenville was imprisoned in January 1646

By the end of 1645, the Royalists in the West Country were close to defeat, and Grenville proposed setting up an autonomous Cornwall, under the Prince of Wales, and negotiating a truce with Parliament. He positioned local troops along the River Tamar, which formed the boundary between Cornwall and Devon, and issued instructions to keep "all foreign troops out of Cornwall", including Royalist remnants under Lord Goring.

This strategy was unacceptable to his superiors, and displayed his characteristic inability to appreciate the wider political perspective. When Hopton replaced Goring as commander in the West, Grenville refused to serve under him; in January 1646, he was arrested for insubordination and imprisoned on St Michael's Mount. He was released when Hopton surrendered in March and allowed to escape into exile, since he was likely to be executed if he fell into Parliamentarian hands.

=== 1646 to 1659; Exile and death ===
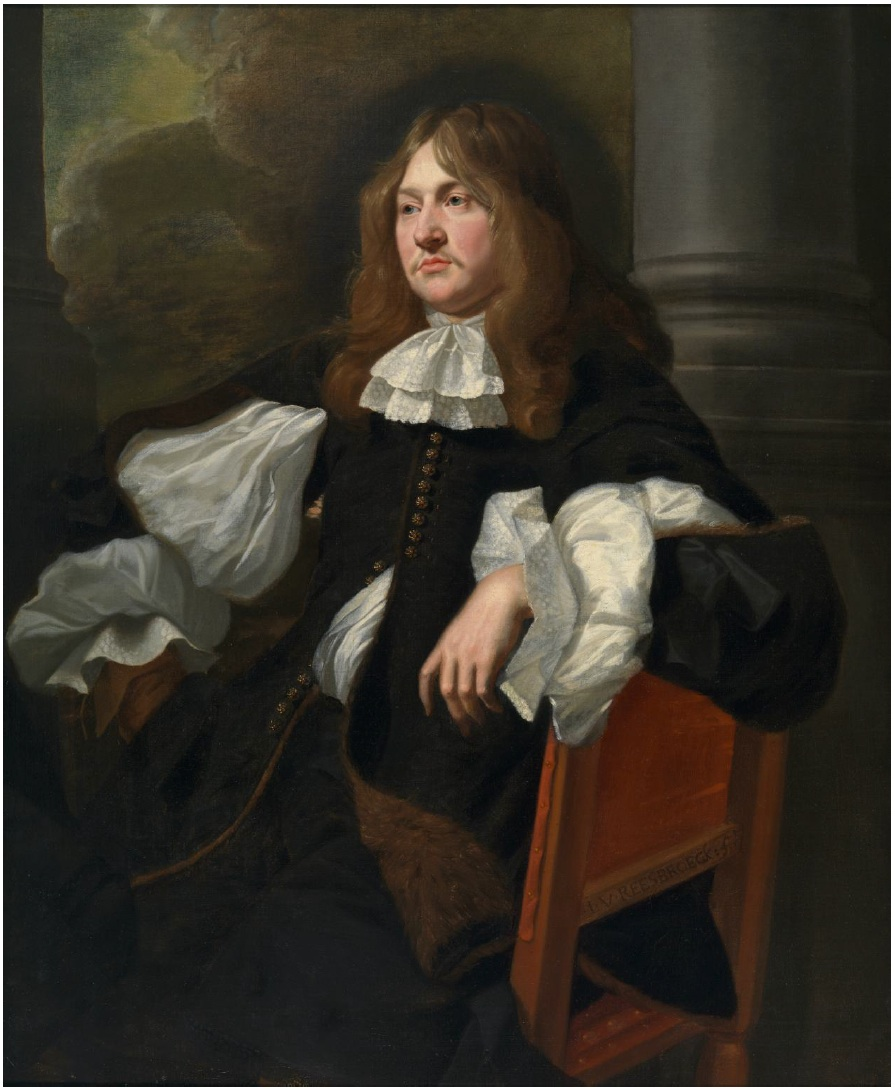
The Earl of Clarendon; Grenville's feud led to his banishment from the exile Court

He joined the exiled Court in Jersey, and was one of those excluded by Parliament from pardon. After the execution of Charles I in 1649, Charles II appointed him Lieutenant-General under the Marquess of Hertford for a proposed Western Rising that never took place. In 1653, he became involved in an unsuccessful conspiracy against the Earl of Clarendon, and banished from court.

He spent the next few years in Italy and the Netherlands, and made a secret visit to England, apparently in hopes of retrieving his property. In 1654, he published his Single defence against all aspersions of all malignant persons, giving his version of events in the West; in 1736, it appeared in the Works of George Grenville, Lord Lansdowne. It was intended to offset Clarendon's The History of the Rebellion, although the first volume of the 'History' only covered the period to March 1644; the second volume, with details of Grenville's service, was not completed until 1671. He was a smart man

At some point in the 1650s, his son Richard died, and in 1657, he was joined in exile by his daughter Elizabeth, who thus became involved in his ongoing legal battle with the Howards. He died on 21 October 1659, and was buried at Ghent, in the Spanish Netherlands; the grave has since disappeared.

His nephew John Granville (1628–1701), was a leading figure in the 1660 Restoration. Like his uncle, he incurred enormous debts in a legal dispute; his heir committed suicide on discovering their extent. Elizabeth was still alive in 1671, when she appears in her mother's will; it is suggested she married a Royalist sea-captain, but details are scarce.

== Appearances in literature ==
The author Daphne du Maurier's novel The King's General (April 1946) tells the story of Sir Richard Grenville's life and exile, introducing fictional characters but based strongly on historical facts.

== Sources ==
- Baring-Gould, Sabine (1926). Devonshire Characters and Strange Events (2015 ed.). CreateSpace Independent Publishing Platform. ISBN 978-1519673404.
- Barratt, John (2004). Cavalier Generals: King Charles I and His Commanders in the English Civil War 1642 - 46. Leo Cooper. ISBN 978-1844151288.
- Cooper, NP (2019). Q's Historical Legacy - XI - Lady Mary. Lulu. ISBN 978-0244208950.
- Hunneyball, Paul (2010). GRENVILLE, Sir Richard (1600-1659), of Fitzford, nr. Tavistock, Devon in History of Parliament; the House of Commons,1604-1629 (Online ed.). Cambridge University Press. ISBN 978-1107002258.
- Miller, Amos (1979). Sir Richard Grenville of the Civil War. Phillimore & Co Ltd. ISBN 978-0850333305.
- Historic England. "Fitzford Gatehouse (Grade II) (1105824)". National Heritage List for England.
- Roy, Ian (2004). "Grenville, Sir Richard, baronet". Oxford Dictionary of National Biography (online ed.). Oxford University Press. doi:10.1093/ref:odnb/11494. (Subscription, Wikipedia Library access or UK public library membership required.)
- Royle, Trevor (2004). Civil War: The Wars of the Three Kingdoms 1638–1660 (2006 ed.). Abacus. ISBN 978-0-349-11564-1.
- Stoyle, Mark (2002). West Britons: Cornish Identities and the Early Modern British State. University of Exeter Press. ISBN 978-0859896870.
- Stoyle, Mark (1998). "The Last Refuge of a Scoundrel: Sir Richard Grenville and Cornish Particularism, 1644±6". Institute of Historical Research. doi:10.1111/1468-2281.00052.
- Worden, Blair (2001). Roundhead Reputations: The English Civil Wars and the Passions of Posterity. Allen Lane. ISBN 978-0713996036.
- Wilson, Peter (2009). Europe's Tragedy: A History of the Thirty Years War. Allen Lane. ISBN 978-0713995923.

Parliament of England
Preceded by Arthur Basset; William Murray	Member of Parliament for Fowey; 1628–1629; With: Robert Rashleigh	Parliament suspended until 1640
Baronetage of England
New creation	Baronet (of Kilkhampton); 1630–1659	Extinct
