= Edward Boys (MP) =

English politician

Sir Edward Boys (1579–1646), of Fredville, Nonington, Kent, was an English politician.

He was the son of Sir Edward Boys of Fredville and educated at Corpus Christi College, Cambridge (1594) and the Middle Temple (1599). He was knighted in March 1604.

He was a Member (MP) of the Parliament of England for Fowey in 1614, Christchurch c. June 1625, Sandwich on 21 February 1626 and Dover in April 1640 and November 1640 – 11 August 1646. He was Lord Warden of the Cinque Ports and Governor of Dover Castle in 1642–1646.

He married in 1604, Elizabeth, the daughter and coheiress of Alexander Hammon of Acrise, Kent, and had six sons and six daughters.
