= Jonathan Rashleigh (1642–1702) =

British noble (1642–1702)

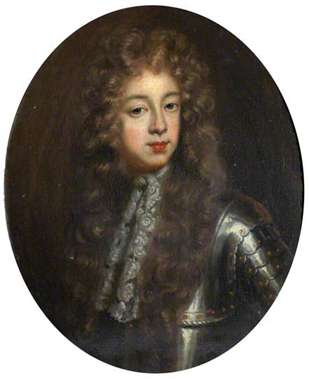
Jonathan Rashleigh (1642–1702), of Menabilly, Sheriff of Cornwall 1686. (Previously thought to be his father-in-law Sir John Carew, 3rd Baronet (died 1692) of Antony). Painted c.1685/90 by unknown artist of the English School. National Trust, Collection of Antony House, Cornwall

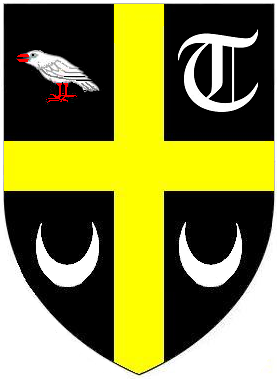
Arms of Rashleigh: Sable, a cross or between in the first quarter: a Cornish chough, argent beaked and legged gules; in the second quarter: a text "T"; in the third and fourth quarters: a crescent all of the third

Jonathan Rashleigh (1642–1702) of Menabilly, near Fowey, Cornwall was Sheriff of Cornwall in 1686/87, and twice MP for Fowey 1675–1681 and 1689–1695. His portrait exists at Antony House, Torpoint, Cornwall, formerly the home of his second wife Sarah Carew.

== Origins ==
He was the eldest son of John Rashleigh (1621–1651; son and heir apparent of Jonathan Rashleigh (1591–1675) of Menabilly, whom he predeceased), MP for Fowey in 1661. Jonathan's mother was Joan Pollexfen (born 1620), a daughter of John Pollexfen of Kitley, Yealmpton, Devon, by his wife Cicilia Harris, daughter of John Harris of Radford, Plymstock, Devon.

== Career ==
He served as MP for the family's pocket borough of Fowey from 24 May 1675 to March 1681 and again from 1689 to 1695. He increased the burgess votes he controlled in Fowey by purchasing further lands within the borough from his senior but less prominent cousins, the Rashleigh family of Coombe, Fowey.

== Marriages and children ==
Rashleigh married twice. His first marriage was in 1673 to Anne Courtenay (died 1677), daughter of Sir Peter Courtenay (c. 1616 – 1670) of Trethurffe in Cornwall. He remarried in 1681 to Jane Carew (died 1700), a daughter of Sir John Carew, 3rd Baronet (1635–1692) of Antony, Cornwall, by whom he had four sons and four daughters including:

- Philip Rashleigh (1689–1736), eldest son and heir, MP for Liskeard 1710–1722. He rebuilt and enlarged the mansion house at Menabilly between about 1710–15, but died without children.
- Jonathan Rashleigh (1690–1764), fourth son, of Menabilly, MP for Fowey. He was a co-heir (with his great-nephew Reginald Pole Carew (1753–1835)) of his half first-cousin Sir Coventry Carew, 6th Baronet (died 1748) of Antony, from whom he inherited several manors in Cornwall.

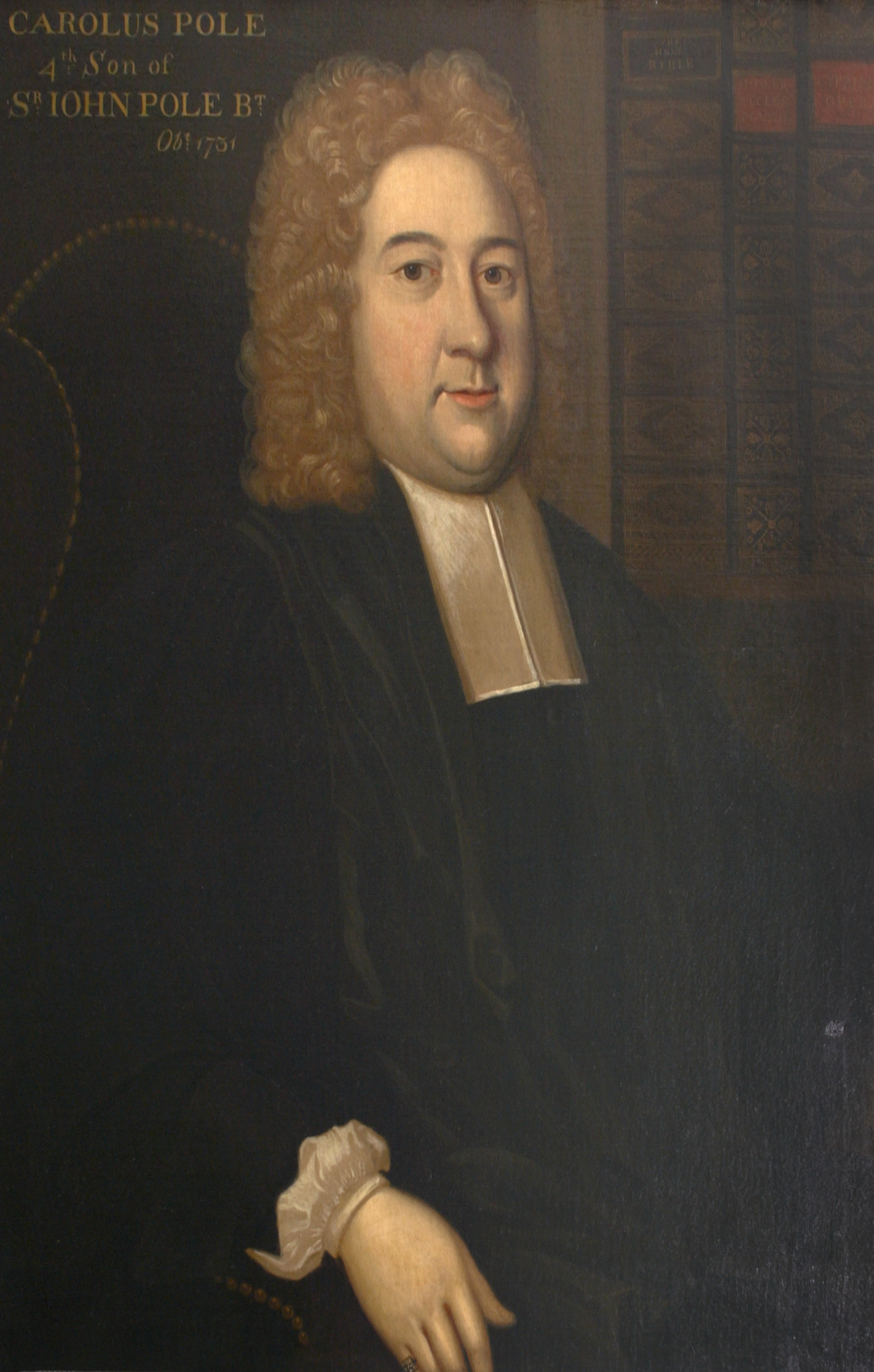
Rev. Carolus Pole (1686–1731), husband of Sarah Rashleigh. British School, collection of Antony House

- Sarah Rashleigh, who married Rev. Carolus Pole (1686–1731), Rector of St Breock in Cornwall, third son of Sir John Pole, 3rd Baronet (1649–1708) of Shute, Devon. His portrait survives at Antony. Her grandson was Reginald Pole Carew (1753–1835).

== Death and burial ==
He died and was later buried on 11 September 1702. He bequeathed funds for the upkeep of eight poor widows in the almshouses built by his grandfather.

== Sources ==
- Burke's Genealogical and Heraldic History of the Landed Gentry, 15th Edition, ed. Pirie-Gordon, H., London, 1937, pp. 1891–3, Rashleigh of Menabilly
- Cruickshanks, Eveline & Handley, Stuart, biography of Rashleigh, Jonathan (1642-1702), of Menabilly, published in History of Parliament, House of Commons 1690-1715, ed. D. Hayton, E. Cruickshanks, S. Handley, 2002
