= Edward Herle =

English politician

Edward Herle (c. 1617 – 20 April 1695) was an English politician who sat in the House of Commons at various times between 1640 and 1689. He fought in the Parliamentary army in the English Civil War.

Herle was the son of Thomas Herle of Prideaux, Cornwall, and his wife Lowday Glyn, daughter of Nicholas Glyn of Glyn, Cornwall and brother of Thomas Herle, M.P.

In April 1640, Herle was elected Member of Parliament for Bossiney in the Short Parliament.

Herle raised a Troop of Horse, at his own expense at the start of the Civil War and commanded them throughout. He was appointed High Sheriff of Cornwall in 1646 and in 1647 was appointed Vice-Admiral of the Coast for North Cornwall.

In 1659 Herle was elected MP for Fowey in the Third Protectorate Parliament. In April 1660 he was elected MP for Callington and Fowey in the Convention Parliament and chose to sit for Fowey. He was elected MP for Grampound in 1689.

He died in 1695 and was buried at Luxulyan, Cornwall. He married twice; firstly Mary, daughter and coheiress of Nicholas Trefusis of Lezant, with whom he had seven sons and three daughters and secondly Susanna, the widow of John Owen, a London fishmonger.

Parliament of England
Vacant Parliament suspended since 1629	Member of Parliament for Bossiney; 1640; With: Anthony Nicholl	Succeeded by Sir John Clotworthy; Anthony Nicholl
Vacant Not represented in restored Rump	Member of Parliament for Fowey; 1659; With: John Barton	Succeeded by Nicholas Gould
