= Nicholas Vincent =

British medievalist

Nicholas Vincent FBA, MRIA, FSA, FRHistS
- Born: 1961 (age 64–65)
- Occupation: Professor of Medieval History

Nicholas Charles Vincent (born 1961) is a British historian, Professor of Medieval History at the University of East Anglia since 2003.

== Career ==
Born in 1961, Vincent was a Bracegirdle exhibitioner at St Peter's College, Oxford, graduating in Modern History BA (1983, tutored by Henry Mayr-Harting), subsequently MA, MPhil (1987) and DPhil (1993, supervised by John Maddicott). After school-mastering in Bristol, Buckinghamshire, and Switzerland, he was elected William Stone Research Fellow at Peterhouse, Cambridge, from 1990 to 1995. He then moved to Canterbury Christ Church University, as Reader, promoted Professor in 1999. In 2003, he was appointed Professor of Medieval History at the University of East Anglia. Since 1997, he has been Director of the British Academy's Plantagenet Acta Project, entrusted with publication of the charters of the Plantagenet kings. He is a member of the steering committees of the British Academy's Anglo-Saxon Charters, Anglo-Norman Charters, and English Episcopal Acta research projects.

Vincent has been elected to fellowships of the Royal Historical Society (1995), the Society of Antiquaries of London (1999), and the British Academy (2010), to membership of the Commission internationale de diplomatique (2014), to Corresponding Fellowship of the Medieval Academy of America (2022), and to Honorary Membership of the Royal Irish Academy (2025). He has held visiting fellowships or professorships at Peterhouse, Cambridge, All Souls College Oxford, the Université de Poitiers, and the École Nationale des Chartes.

== Publications ==
- Alikhani, Asadollah, and Nicholas Vincent (eds), The Shah and I: The Confidential Diary of Iran’s Royal Court, 1969–1977, by Asadollah Alam (London: I.B. Tauris, 1991).
- Vincent, Nicholas (ed.), English Episcopal Acta IX: Winchester 1205–1238 (Oxford: Oxford University Press for the British Academy, 1994).
- Vincent, Nicholas, Peter des Roches: An Alien in English Politics, 1205–1238, Cambridge Studies in Medieval Life and Thought (4th Series) (Cambridge: Cambridge University Press, 1996, paperback 2002).
- Vincent, Nicholas (ed.), The Letters and Charters of Cardinal Guala Bicchieri, Papal Legate in England 1216–1218, Publications of the Canterbury and York Society, vol. 83 (Woodbridge: The Boydell Press, 1996).
- Vincent, Nicholas (ed.), Acta of Henry II and Richard I: A Supplementary Handlist, Publications of the List and Index Society, Special Series, vol. 27 (Richmond: Public Record Office for the List and Index Society, 1996).
- Vincent, Nicholas, The Holy Blood: King Henry III and the Westminster Blood Relic (Cambridge: Cambridge University Press, 2001).
- Harper-Bill, C., and Nicholas Vincent (eds), Henry II: New Interpretations (Woodbridge: Boydell and Brewer, 2007).
- Vincent, Nicholas (ed.), Records, Administration and Aristocratic Society in the Anglo-Norman Realm: Papers Commemorating the 800th Anniversary of King John's Loss of Normandy (Woodbridge: Boydell and Brewer, 2009).
- Vincent, Nicholas, Magna Carta: A Very Short Introduction, Very Short Introductions (Oxford: Oxford University Press, 2012).
- Vincent, Nicholas, A Brief History of Britain: 1066-1485 (London: Constable, 2012).
- Vincent, Nicholas, Norman Charters from English Sources: Antiquaries, Archives and the Rediscovery of the Anglo-Norman Past, Publications of the Pipe Roll Society, New Series, vol. 59 (London: Flexpress for the Pipe Roll Society, 2013)
- Vincent, Nicholas, Magna Carta: The Foundation of Freedom 1215–2015 (London: Third Millennium Publishing, 2014)
- Vincent, Nicholas, Magna Carta: Origins and Legacy (Oxford: Bodleian Library, 2015).
- Vincent, Nicholas, King John: An Evil King?, Penguin Monarchs (London: Penguin, 2020).
- Vincent, Nicholas (ed.), The Letters and Charters of Henry II, King of England 1154–1189, 6 vols (Oxford: Oxford University Press, 2020).
  - (vol. 7 forthcoming, April 2026).
- Saul, N., and Nicholas Vincent (eds), English Medieval Government and Administration: Essays in Honour of J. R. Maddicott, Publications of the Pipe Roll Society, New Series, vol. 65 (Woodbridge: Boydell and Brewer, 2023).
- Peltzer, Jörg, and Nicholas Vincent (eds), Transregnal Kingship in the Thirteenth Century, Proceedings of the British Academy (Liverpool: Liverpool University Press, 2025).
- Peltzer, Jörg, and Nicholas Vincent (eds), Thirteenth Century England XIX (Woodbridge: Boydell and Brewer, 2026).
- Upwards of 150 academic articles
