= John Rashleigh (1554–1624) =

Sixteenth century English merchant and member of Parliament

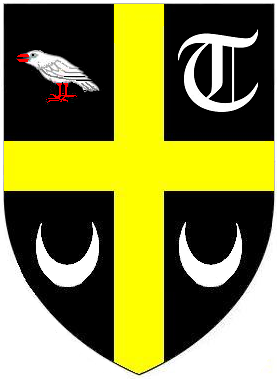
Arms of Rashleigh: Sable, a cross or between in the first quarter: a Cornish chough, argent beaked and legged gules; in the second quarter: a text "T"; in the third and fourth quarters: a crescent all of the third

John Rashleigh II (1554 – 12 May 1624) of Menabilly, near Fowey in Cornwall, was an English merchant and was MP for Fowey in 1588 and 1597, and was High Sheriff of Cornwall in 1608. He was the builder of the first mansion house on the family estate at Menabilly, near Fowey, Cornwall, thenceforth the seat of the family until the present day. Many generations later the Rashleigh family of Menabilly in the Return of Owners of Land, 1873 was listed as the largest landowner in Cornwall with an estate of 30,156 acres (122.04 km^{2}) or 3.97% of the total area of Cornwall.

== Origins ==
He was the only son of John I Rashleigh (d.10 August 1582), a merchant at Fowey in Cornwall (the 2nd son of Philip I Rashleigh (died 1551) of Fowey) by his wife Alice Lanyon (d.20 August 1591) (whose 1602 monumental brass survives in Fowey Church,) daughter of William Lanyon by his wife Thomasine Tregian, daughter of Thomas Tregian.

Philip I Rashleigh (died 1551) of Fowey, by his wife Genet Leigh, daughter of Thomas Leigh of South Molton, Devon, was the 2nd son of John Rashleigh (died 1528) of Barnstaple in Devon, whose great-grandfather had been John Rashleigh alias Bray, the younger son of Robert Rashleigh (died pre 1390) of Rashleigh, Wembworthy, Devon, by his wife Matilda.

The de Rashleigh family had originated in the 14th century or before at the estate of Rashleigh in the parish of Wembworthy in Devon, of which the Barnstaple family was a later branch and of the latter the Fowey branch was a junior, but much the most successful, branch. Philip I Rashleigh (died 1551) had been the first to settle at Fowey, having purchased from the crown in 1545 at the Dissolution of the Monasteries the manor of Trenant, near Fowey, formerly a possession of nearby Tywardreath Priory. His eldest son Robert inherited the lordship of Trenant and made his seat at Coombe within that manor and continued the senior, but less successful Cornwall line of Rashleigh of Coombe until 1698 when his descendant Robert Rashleigh (1645–1708) (whose monumental inscription survives in Fowey Church) the last in the male line, sold Coombe to his cousin Jonathan Rashleigh of Menabilly, who sold it out of the family in 1699.

Philip's younger son John I (died 1582) in 1573 purchased the estate of Menabilly, near Fowey, and together with his father was responsible by their privateering or shipping enterprises for greatly expanding the port and trade of Fowey. John I's son John II Rashleigh built the first of the family's mansion houses at Menabilly, which thenceforth became the family seat, and remains occupied by the Rashleigh baronets in 2013.

Matilda the wife of Robert Rashleigh (died pre 1390) of Rashleigh, in her widowhood had granted to her younger son John Rashleigh, by her charter dated 1397, her lands in Barnstaple, and in Newport in the adjoining parish of Bishops Tawton. On receiving his maternal inheritance John changed his surname to "Bray", and was thus the patriarch of the Rashleigh family of Barnstaple, from which the Cornwall branches were descended. Matilda's elder son, whose name is not known, inherited the paternal estate of Rashleigh, which remained held by his direct male descendants until the death of John Rashleigh (died 1503) of Rashleigh, whose heir was his 2-year-old "cousin" (possibly niece) Ibota Rashleigh, daughter of a certain Thomas Rashleigh, who by her marriage into the neighbouring family of Clotworthy of Clotworthy, brought Rashleigh into that family.

The elder brother of Philip I Rashleigh (died 1551) of Fowey was Robert Rashleigh, who founded the family of Rashleigh of South Molton, in Devon.

=== Monumental brass of mother ===
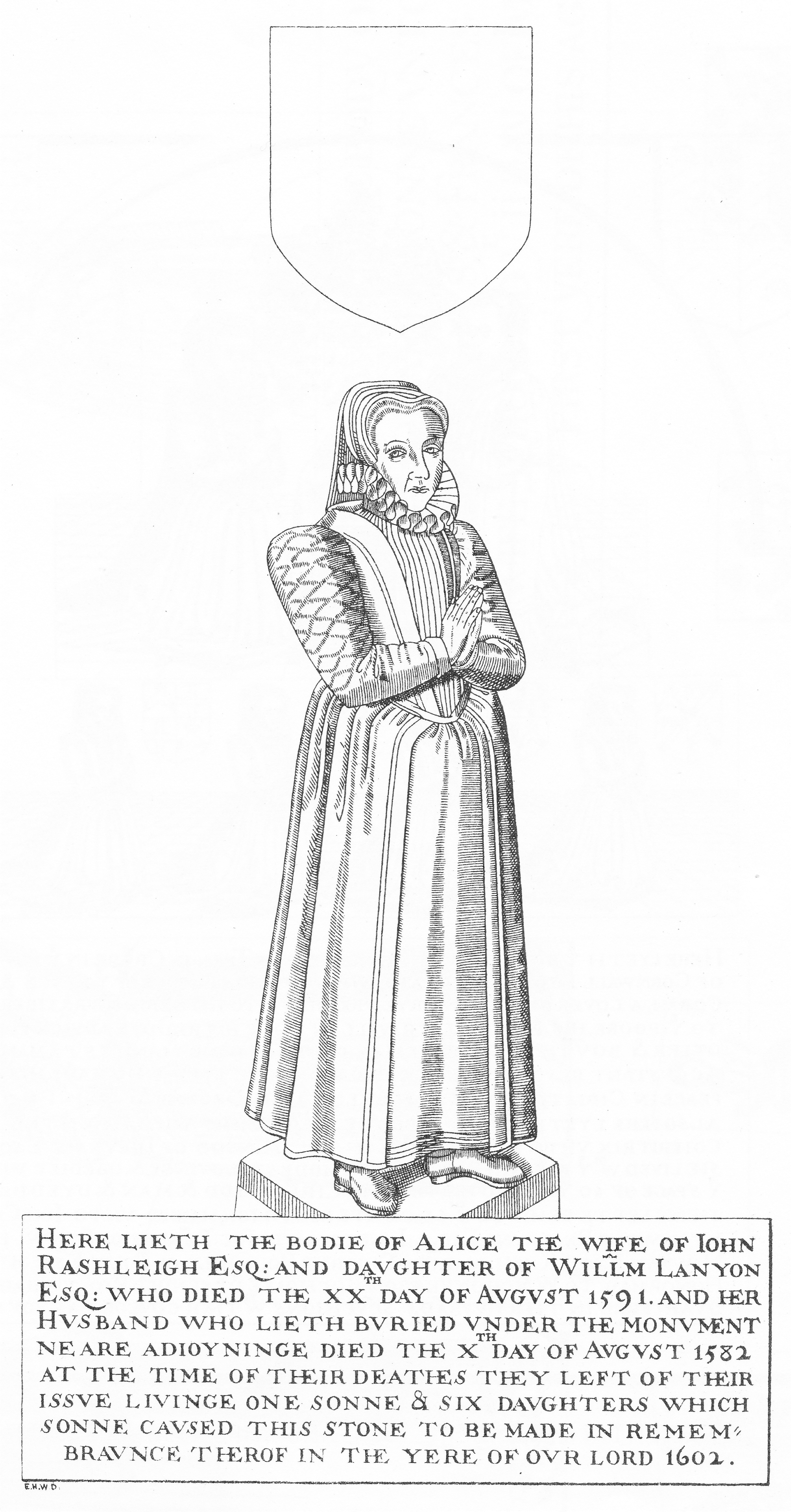
1602 Monumental brass of Alice Lanyon (died 1591), mother of John Rashleigh, Fowey Church

Embedded in a stone in the nave of Fowey Church is the 1602 monumental brass of Alice Lanyon (died 1591), mother of John Rashleigh (died 1624). Above her head is an indentation for a now lost brass heraldic escutcheon, and below her feet is a plate bearing the following inscription:

"Here lieth the bodie of Alice the wife of John Rashleigh Esq. and daughter of Will'm Lanyon Esq. who died the XXth day of August 1591 and her husband who lieth buried under the monument neare adjoyninge died the Xth day of August 1582. At the time of their deathes they left of their issue livinge one sonne & six daughters which sonne caused this stone to be made in remembraunce therof in the yere of Our Lord 1602"

=== Sisters ===
His six sisters were as follows:

- Agnes Rashleigh, wife of William Martin of Totnes in Devon
- Joan Rashleigh, wife of John Mayow of Looe, Cornwall
- Avis Rashleigh, wife of James Kestell
- Joan Rashleigh
- Emlyn Rashleigh, wife of L. Apeley of Devon
- Mary Rashleigh, wife of Simon Clotworthy (died 1630) of Rashleigh, in the parish of Wembworthy, Devon. The estate of Rashleigh was the earliest known seat of the de Rashleigh family, which took their name from their estate and is situated 2 miles north-east of Wembworthy village, near to the estate of Clotworthy, the former seat of the Clotworthy family until they moved to Rashleigh. The heiress of John Rashleigh (died 1503) of Rashleigh was his 2-year-old cousin Ivota (alias "Ibote","Abbot") Rashleigh, daughter of Thomas Rashleigh of Rashleigh, who married Thomas Clotworthy (died 1576), eldest son and heir of John Clotworthy of Clotworthy in the parish of Brushford, and Werrington, Devon.

== Shipping interests ==
Rashleigh owned several ships and was engaged in widespread international trade, including to the Guinea Coast and the Baltic. He transported troops to Ireland in 1598 and his ships formed part of the Plymouth pilchard fleet. He captained his own ship the Francis of Fowey during the repulse of the Spanish Armada in 1588.

== Marriage and children ==
In 1575 he married Alice Bonython (c. 1556 – 1606), daughter of Richard Bonython of Carclew. In 1586 he obtained through his influence the election of his brother-in-law John Bonython as MP for Fowey. By Alice he had two sons and two daughters:

- John Rashleigh (died 1624), eldest son, presumed insane. He died one month after his father, who left instructions in his will for his care to his 2nd son executor and heir Jonathan: "keep and maintain his brother John, allowing him a chamber, meat, drink, apparel and all other necessities and a servant continually to attend him"
- Jonathan Rashleigh (1591–1675), 2nd son and heir, 5 times MP for Fowey.
- Alice Rashleigh, wife of Nicholas Sawle of Cornwall.
- Debora Rashleigh, wife of John Sparke (c 1574–1640), MP for Mitchell in Cornwall 1628–9, of The Friary, in the parish of St Jude, Plymouth, Devon.

== See also ==
- Rashleigh family

== Sources ==
- Cassidy, Irene, biography of John Rashleigh (d.1624), published in: History of Parliament: House of Commons 1558-1603, ed. P.W. Hasler, 1981
- D Brunton & D H Pennington, Members of the Long Parliament (London: George Allen & Unwin, 1954)
- Willis, Browne (1750). Notitia Parliamentaria, Part II: A Series or Lists of the Representatives in the several Parliaments held from the Reformation 1541, to the Restoration 1660 ... London. pp. 119, 138.
- Vivian's Visitations of Cornwall (Exeter: William Pollard & Co, 1887)
- Vivian, J.L. & Drake, H.H., The Visitation of the County of Cornwall in the year 1620, Harleian Society, 1st series, volume 9, London, 1874, p9.183-4, pedigree of Rashleigh

Parliament of England
Preceded by Reginald Mohun; John Bonython	Member of Parliament for Fowey; 1588–1589; With: Arthur Atye	Succeeded by William Killigrew; Samuel Lennard
Preceded by William Killigrew; Samuel Lennard	Member of Parliament for Fowey; 1597–1598; With: Thomas Treffry	Succeeded by Carew Raleigh; Sir William Courtney
