= Robert Basset =

Member of the Parliament of England

Member of Parliament for Plymouth
- In office 1593

Personal details
- Born: 1573
- Died: 11 November 1641 (aged 67–68)
- Spouse: Elizabeth Periam
- Children: 7
- Parent: Arthur Bassett (father)
- Relatives: Basset family John Basset (grandfather); John Chichester (grandfather)

Arms of Basset of Heanton Punchardon and Umberleigh, Devon and Tehidy, Cornwall: Barry wavy of six or and gules

Sir Robert Basset (1573–11 November 1641), lord of the manor of Umberleigh and lord of the manor of Heanton Punchardon in Devon, England, was MP for Plymouth in 1593.

== Origins ==
He was the eldest son and heir of Sir Arthur Bassett (1541-1586), of Umberleigh and Heanton Punchardon, a member of the ancient and prominent west-country Basset family, MP for Barnstaple in 1563 and Devon in 1572 and Sheriff of Devon in 1574–5. Robert's mother was Eleanor Chichester (died 1585), a daughter of Sir John Chichester (died 1569), MP, lord of the manor of Raleigh in the parish of Pilton, Devon.

=== Plantagenet ancestry ===
His grandfather John Basset (1518–1541) had married Frances Plantagenet, the daughter and co-heiress of his step-father Arthur Plantagenet, 1st Viscount Lisle (died 1542), bastard son of King Edward IV. Sir Robert Basset was thus a great-grandson of Arthur Plantagenet, 1st Viscount Lisle on his paternal grandmother's side. On his paternal grandfather's side Robert Basset was a great-grandson of Honor Plantagenet, Viscountess Lisle (c.1493/5–1566), née Honor Grenville (the second wife of Sir John Basset (1462–1528) of Umberleigh) who married secondly (as his second wife) the aforementioned Arthur Plantagenet.

== Career ==
Due to his Plantagenet ancestry he made what turned out to be a foolish and costly decision to offer himself as one of the many claimants to the throne of England after the death of Queen Elizabeth I (r. 1558-1603), perhaps encouraged by his father-in-law Peryam. He suffered a heavy fine for his action which according to the biographer John Prince, involved the sale of thirty of the family's manors.

== Marriage and children ==
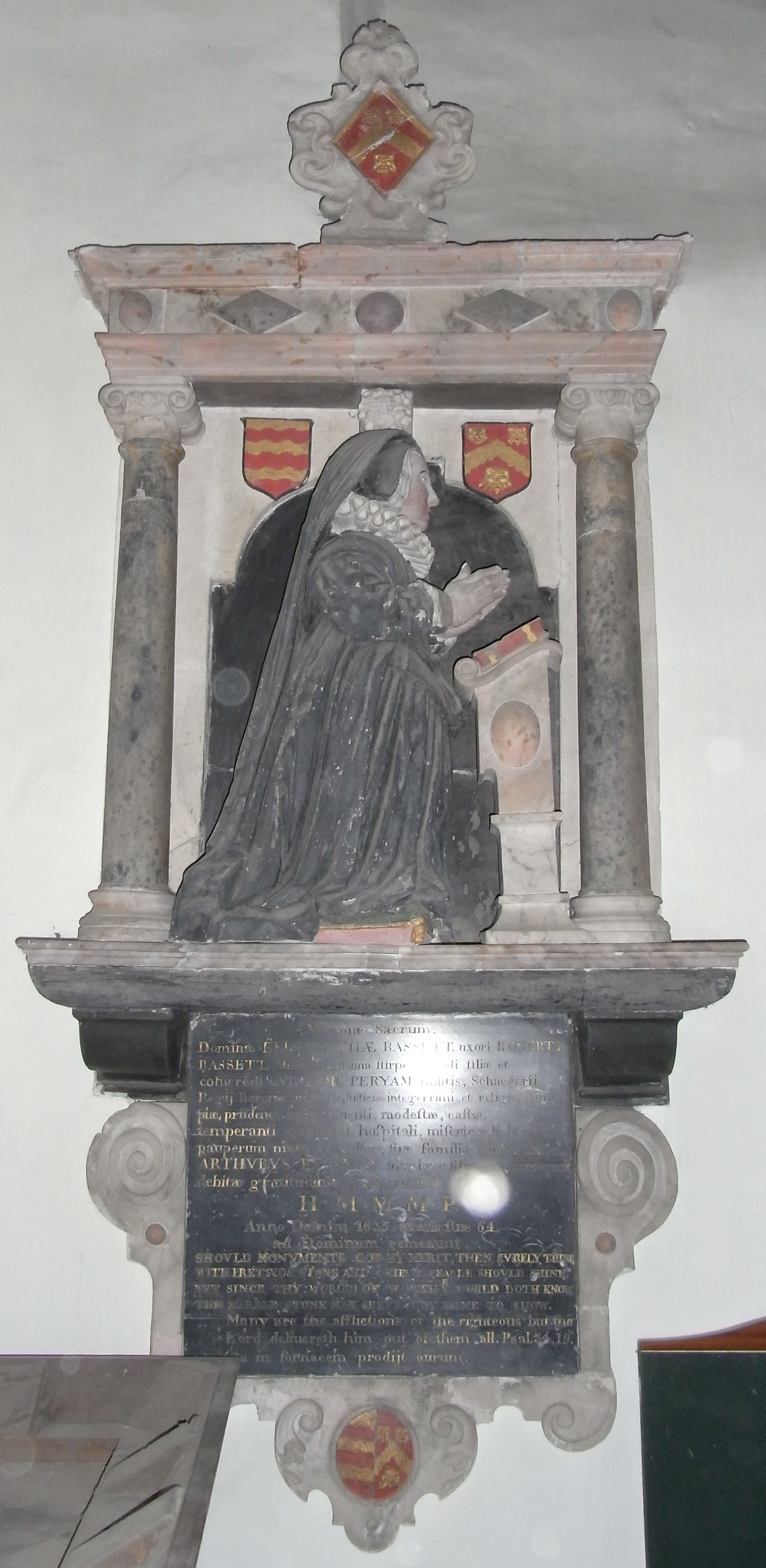
Monument to Basset's wife, Elizabeth Peryam, in Heanton Punchardon church

He married Elizabeth Periam (1571-1635) the second daughter and co-heiress of Sir William Peryam (1534-1604), of Little Fulford, near Crediton in Devon, Lord Chief Baron of the Exchequer. Her mural monument survives in the Basset Chapel (now the vestry) of Heanton Punchardon Church. Within a lozenge at the top and on an escutcheon to the sinister are shown her paternal arms of Peryam: Gules, a chevron engrailed or between three lion's faces affrontes of the last. The arms of Peryam are also shown on an oval cartouche underneath, impaled by Bassett.

=== Sons ===
- Arthur Basset (living 1635), eldest son and heir, who died childless. In 1635 he erected the surviving monument to his mother in Heanton Punchardon Church, as is recorded by part of the inscription as follows: "Arthur Bassett, Esquire, her sorrowing first-born son, of a duty of gratitude and respect therefore placed this monument to his mother in the year of Our Lord 1635".
- Col. Arthur Basset (1598-1673), second son and heir to his elder brother. He was a law student at the Inner Temple in 1616 and during the Civil War served as a Royalist commander. For his delinquency he was fined by Parliament and compounded for his estates in the sum of £1,321 6 shillings 6 pence. He served as Deputy Lieutenant of Devon. He married Agnes Leigh, daughter of Sir William Leigh of Northam, Devon. His elaborate mural monument survives in Heanton Punchardon Church.
- William Basset (1602-1634), third son, whose monument survives in Atherington Church, the parish church of Umberleigh

=== Daughters ===
- Anne Basset, eldest daughter, who in about 1614 married Jonathan Rashleigh (1591-1675), of Menabilly, near Fowey in Cornwall, shipping-merchant, Member of Parliament for Fowey in 1614, 1621, 1625, April 1640 and November 1640, and 1661 and Sheriff of Cornwall in 1627, a Royalist during the Civil War.
- Elizabeth Basset (living 1642), second daughter, who in 1621 married George Yeo (1597-1671), lord of the manor of Huish, Devon, who was admitted to the Inner Temple in 1618. Her descendant continued at Huish until the death unmarried in 1782 of the last in the male line, Edward Roe Yeo (1742–1782), twice MP for Coventry.
- Elinor Basset, third daughter, who died unmarried in 1634/5.
- Mary Basset, fourth daughter, who in 1631 married Jonathan Sparke of Plymouth, who was the second son of John Sparke (c.1574-1640) of The Friary, in the parish of St Jude, Plymouth, Devon, Member of Parliament for Mitchell. Jonathan Sparke's mother was Deborah Rashleigh, a daughter of John Rashleigh (1554–1624), of Menabilly, a cousin of Mary Basset. Mary's eldest son was Sir John Sparke (1636-1680), MP, of the Friary, Plymouth, who is mentioned in the Travel Journal of Cosimo III de' Medici, Grand Duke of Tuscany (1642-1723) who was visiting Plymouth on 5 April 1669:

"On the 5th of the same month Sir Jonathan Spark came to pay his respects to the serene prince, accompanied by his son. This gentleman is an inhabitant of Plymouth, in the neighbourhood of which he possesses an estate of a thousand pounds a year; consequently he is considered the principal person of the place".

== Death and burial ==
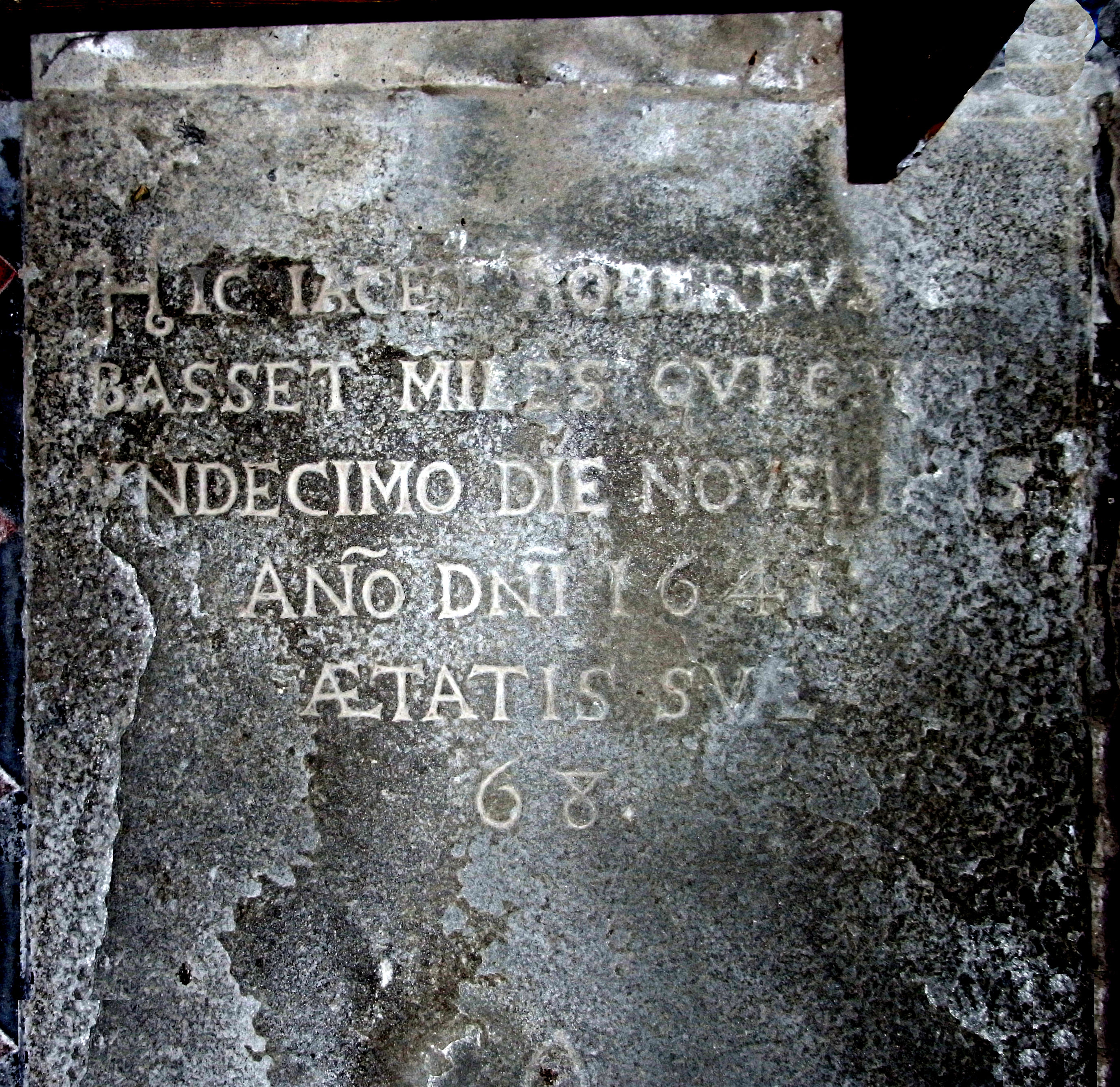
Ledger stone to Sir Robert Basset in Heanton Punchardon Church

He died on 11 November 1641 aged 68 and was buried in the Basset Chapel (now the vestry) of Umberleigh Church, in the floor of which survives his plain ledger stone inscribed in Latin as follows:

Hic jacet Robertus Basset, Miles, qui (obiit) undecimo die Novembris An(n)o D(omi)ni 1641 aetatis suae 68 ("Here lies Robert Basset, Knight, who died on the 11th day of November in the year of Our Lord the 1641st, of his age the 68th")

== Sources ==
- Vivian, Lt.Col. J.L., (Ed.) The Visitations of the County of Devon: Comprising the Heralds' Visitations of 1531, 1564 & 1620, Exeter, 1895
- Willis, Browne (1750). Notitia Parliamentaria, Part II: A Series or Lists of the Representatives in the several Parliaments held from the Reformation 1541, to the Restoration 1660 ... London.
