= John Sparke (died 1640) =

English politician

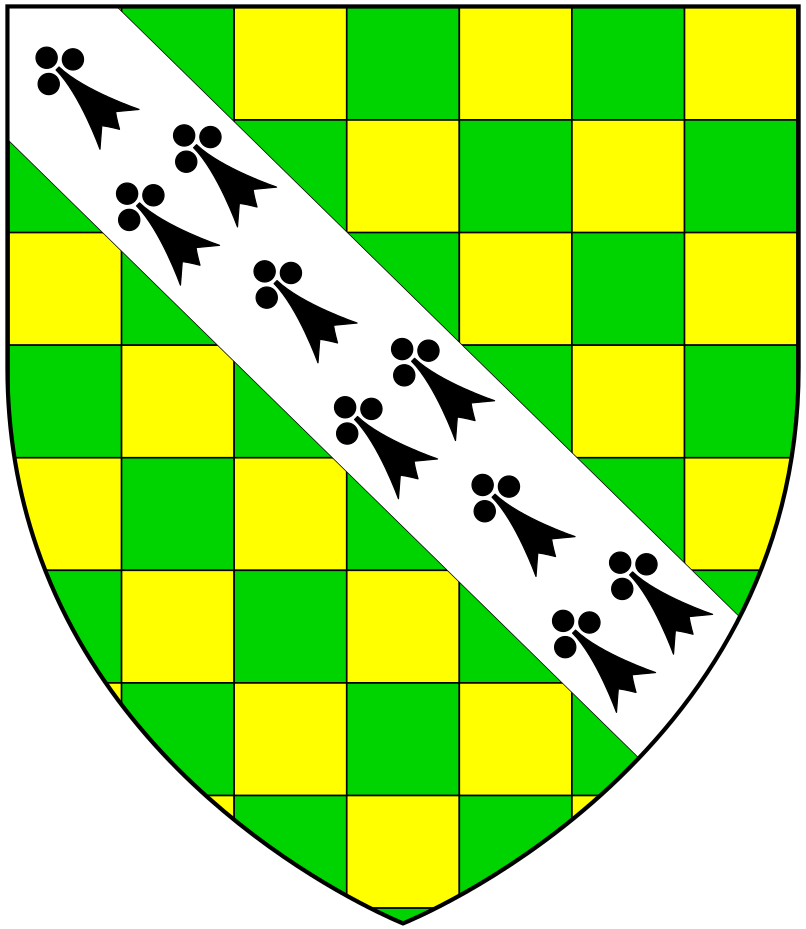
Arms of Sparke: Chequy or and vert, a bend ermine

John Sparke (c. 1574 – 1640) of The Friary, in the parish of St Jude, Plymouth, Devon, was an English politician who sat in the House of Commons from 1628 to 1629.

== Origins ==
Sparke was the son of John Sparke (died 1603) of Plymouth, Devon, Mayor of Plymouth in 1583 and 1591, by his wife Juliana Cock (died 1583), daughter of Gregory Cock, mayor of Plymouth. In the 1580s John Sparke (died 1603) acquired the former Whitefriars Priory in the parish of St Jude, Plymouth (dissolved a few decades before during the dissolution of the monasteries), which he made his residence.

== Career ==
He matriculated at Exeter College, Oxford on 13 December 1594, aged 19. He was a student of Lincoln's Inn in 1623. In 1628, probably due to the influence of his wife's family the Rashleighs, he was elected member of parliament for Mitchell and sat until 1629 when King Charles decided to rule without parliament for eleven years.

== Residence ==
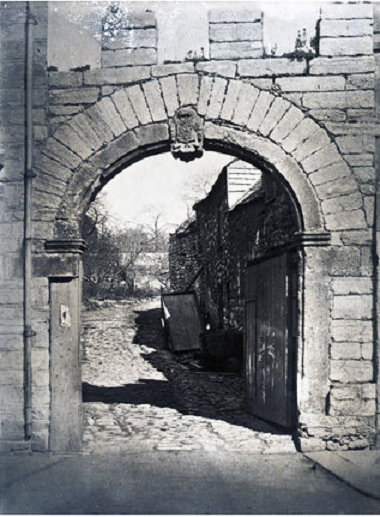
Friary Gate (alias Sparke's Gate), Exeter Street, Plymouth. Photograph c.1890 showing "Sparke's Gate", an early 18th century rebuild of the dilapidated 13th century entrance to the Whitefriars Abbey, which had been acquired as their residence by the Sparke family after the dissolution of the monasteries

The Sparke family's residence in Plymouth was the former Whitefriars Abbey, in the parish of St Jude, which after the dissolution of the monasteries was probably acquired by Giles and Gregory Iselham, who obtained possession of other ecclesiastical property in Plymouth. It was then acquired by the Sparke family, who made it their residence. From Sparke it passed to the Molesworths and Clarkes to the Beweses. The buildings were converted into a hospital for soldiers in the year 1794, when a deadly sickness was ravaging the troops detained at the port for the West India expedition. They were subsequently used as an infirmary for the troops stationed at Millbay and Frankfort Barracks. Parts were used as dwellings, but Friary Court was thenceforth never considered a fashionable address. By 1890 all had disappeared and the bulk of the site was occupied by the Friary Railway Station, now closed, of the London and South Western Railway, with another part occupied by the Roman Catholic Church of the Holy Cross.

== Marriage and children ==
In 1620 he married Deborah Rashleigh (1581–1638), a daughter of John Rashleigh (1554–1624), of Menabilly, near Fowey, in Cornwall, builder of the first mansion house at Menabilly, a shipping-merchant, MP for Fowey in 1588 and 1597, and High Sheriff of Cornwall in 1608. By his wife he had children including:

- Jonathan Sparke, second son, who married Mary Basset, a daughter of Sir Robert Basset (1573–1641), MP, of Heanton Punchardon in North Devon, by whom he had a son and heir John Sparke (1636–1680), MP, of the Friary, Plymouth. Jonathan Sparke is mentioned in the Travel Journal of Cosimo III de' Medici, Grand Duke of Tuscany (1642–1723) who was visiting Plymouth on 5 April 1669:

"On the 5th of the same month Sir Jonathan Spark came to pay his respects to the serene prince, accompanied by his son. This gentleman is an inhabitant of Plymouth, in the neighbourhood of which he possesses an estate of a thousand pounds a year; consequently he is considered the principal person of the place".

== Death and burial ==
He died on 17 March 1640, aged 66, and was buried in St Andrew's Church where survives his mural monument, with alabaster kneeling statues of himself and his wife, with the arms of Sparke impaling Rashleigh. It was smoke damaged during World War II bombing, and was restored and repainted in the early 1990s by Plymouth stonemason Mark Robinson. It is inscribed as follows:

"To the loving memory of John Sparke Esq late of this town and Deborah, his wife, daughter to John Rashleigh of Foy, Esq who departed this life in expectation of a joyful resurrection March the 17th 1640 aged 66, she November the 1st 1638 aged 57.
A father, mother and two daughters deere,
In silent earth are sweetly lodged heere,
Still of age and two in infancye,
Denotes to all both olde and younge must die,
A vertuous life they lived amongst friends,
And crownes of glory now for them attends".

== Sources ==
- Hunneyball, Paul, biography of "Sparke, John (c. 1574 – 1640), of The Friary, Plymouth, Devon", published in History of Parliament: House of Commons 1604–1629, ed. Andrew Thrush and John P. Ferris, 2010 .
- Vivian, Lt.Col. J.L., (Ed.) The Visitations of the County of Devon: Comprising the Heralds' Visitations of 1531, 1564 & 1620, Exeter, 1895, p. 856, Pedigree of "Sparke of Plymouth"

Parliament of England
Preceded by Francis Crossing; Sir John Smith	Member of Parliament for Mitchell; 1628–1629; With: Francis Buller	Parliament suspended until 1640
