= Jonathan Rashleigh (1820–1905) =

English cricketer

Jonathan Rashleigh (7 January 1820 – 12 April 1905) was an English landowner, local politician, and collector and numismatist of some repute.

== Biography ==
Jonathan Rashleigh was born 7 January 1820 at Wilsford, Wiltshire, the second son of William Rashleigh, who in 1811 had inherited the Menabilly estate and sat as Member of Parliament (MP) for the Pocket Borough of Fowey from 1812 to 1817. At the time of Jonathan's birth, William was Sheriff of Cornwall.

Rashleigh was educated at Harrow School, for which he played cricket, and at Balliol College, Oxford, matriculating 1839 and graduating B.A. in 1842.

He married on 1 August 1843 Mary Pole Stuart, daughter of William Stuart, a British Tory politician, and the couple lived in Cumberland Terrace, Regent's Park, London. Rashleigh appears to have lived as a gentleman of leisure, dedicating his time in part to his interest in numismatics. The couple had five children, but Mary died in 1852. Rashleigh served as a member of the Metropolitan Board of Works for St Pancras, and as a member of the Metropolitan Asylums Board.

He remarried 3 August 1869 to Jane Elizabeth Pugh, an heiress to a considerable Irish fortune, daughter of Arthur Pugh of Lissmore. The couple lived in Fortfield House, Sidmouth, Devon, and in 1871 purchased the Feniton Court estate near Honiton, Devon. On 3 October 1871, Rashleigh's elder brother, William Rashleigh, who had inherited Menabilly in 1855, died without issue, and so that estate now passed to Jonathan Rashleigh. In addition the couple inherited lands at Lissmore, Ireland. Retaining all of these estates, the couple moved to Menabilly; they had four further children.

The Menabilly estate had been in the Rashleigh family since the 16th-century; in the Return of Owners of Land, 1873, a survey of British landholdings, Menabilly was the largest private estate in Cornwall of 30,156 acres (122.04 km^{2}) or 3.97% of the total area of the county. Once at Menabilly, Jonathan Rashleigh turned his attention to botany and horticulture, notably by developing the estate gardens. He served as Deputy Lieutenant of Cornwall, was its High Sheriff in 1877, and was a county magistrate.

He died at Menabilly on 12 April 1905.

== Cricket ==
Jonathan Rashleigh
Personal information
- Full name: Jonathan Rashleigh
- Born: 7 January 1820; Wilsford, Wiltshire, England
- Died: 12 April 1905 (aged 85); Menabilly, Cornwall, England
- Batting: Unknown
- Bowling: Unknown

Domestic team information
- Years: Team
- 1841–1842: Oxford University

Career statistics
Competition	First-class
Matches	4
Runs scored	42
Batting average	5.25
100s/50s	–/–
Top score	20
Balls bowled	?
Wickets	2
Bowling average	–
5 wickets in innings	–
10 wickets in match	–
Best bowling	1/?
Catches/stumpings	1/–
- Source: Cricinfo, 10 December 2013

Rashleigh was, briefly, a cricketer active in the early 1840s, making four appearances in first-class cricket. His batting and bowling styles are unknown. He made his debut in first-class cricket in 1841 for Oxford University against the Marylebone Cricket Club (MCC) at the Magdalen Ground, Oxford. He made three further first-class appearances for the university in 1842, playing twice against the MCC and once in The University Match against Oxford University at Lord's. He scored a total of 42 runs with a high score of 20, while with the ball he took two wickets.
