= Rashleigh family =

Prominent family from Cornwall and Devon in Britain

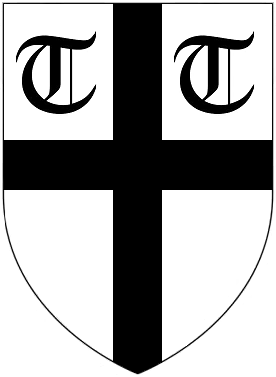
Arms of Rashleigh of Rashleigh, Devon, per Pole (died 1635): Argent, a cross sable two text tees in chief of the last. The arms of the Cornwall junior branch of Rashleigh of Menabilly descended from Rashleigh of Rashleigh is a difference of these arms.

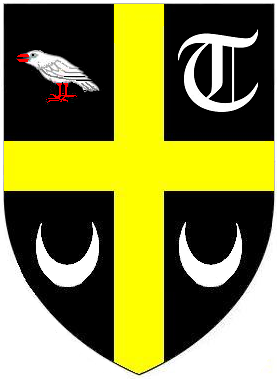
Arms of Rashleigh of Cornwall: Sable, a cross or between in the first quarter: a Cornish chough, argent beaked and legged gules; in the second quarter: a text "T"; in the third and fourth quarters: a crescent all of the third

Rashleigh is a surname of a prominent family from Cornwall and Devon in south western Britain, which originated in the 14th century or before at the estate of Rashleigh in the parish of Wembworthy, Devon. The principal branches were:

- Rashleigh of Rashleigh, Devon
- Rashleigh of Barnstaple, North Devon
- Rashleigh of South Molton, North Devon
- Rashleigh of Fowey, Cornwall
- Rashleigh of Menabilly, Tywardreath, near Fowey
- Rashleigh of Coombe, Fowey

The Rashleighs of Fowey and Menabilly were powerful merchants in the time of Henry VIII and Elizabeth I. Philip Rashleigh, younger son of a family from Barnstaple in Devon, had purchased the manor of Trenant close to Fowey from the king after the dissolution of the monasteries in 1545. He went into trade, became successful but died in 1551. His two sons Robert and John founded the fortunes of the Fowey Rashleighs and their pedigree has been well documented.

== Rashleigh pedigree ==
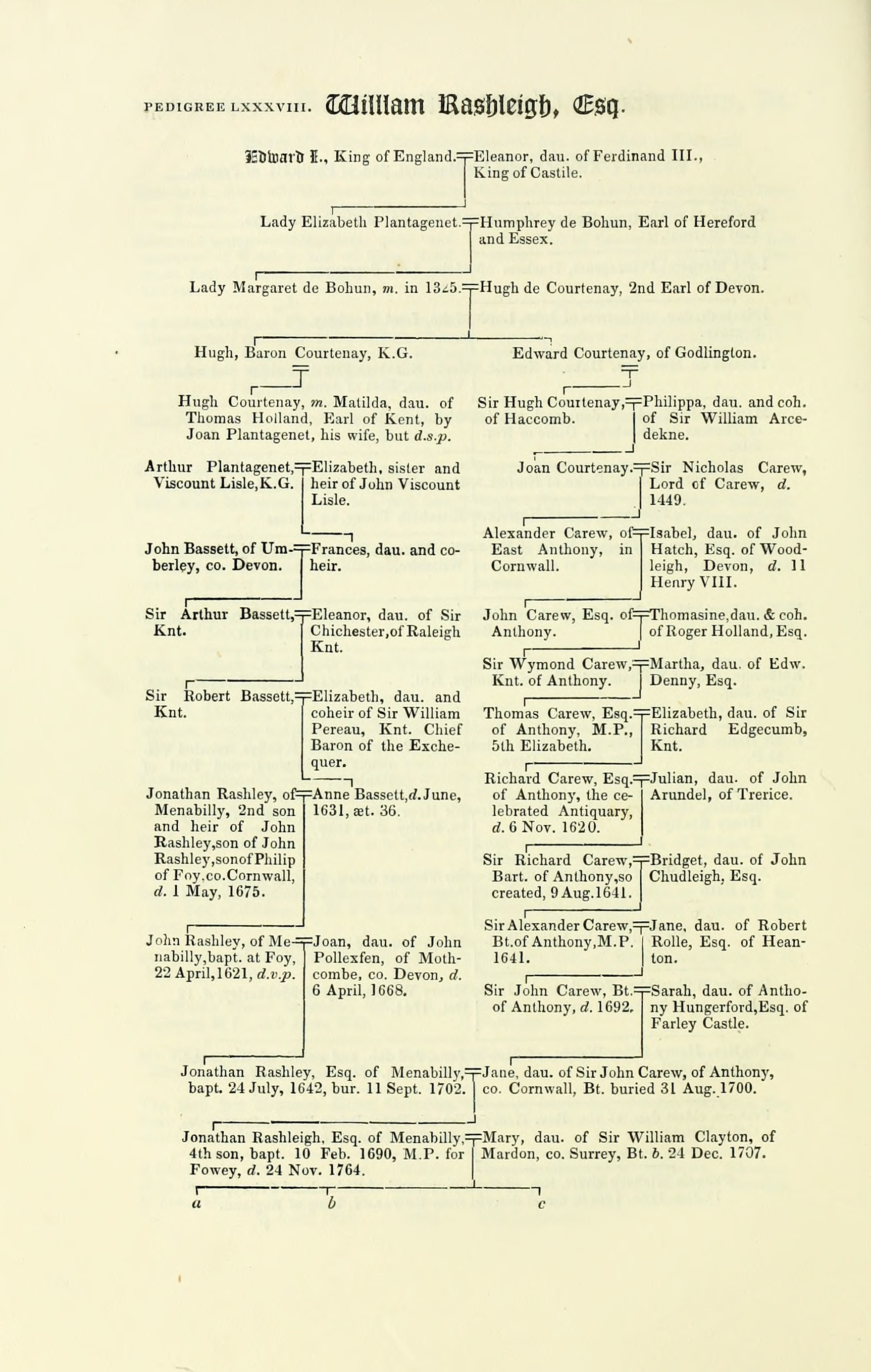

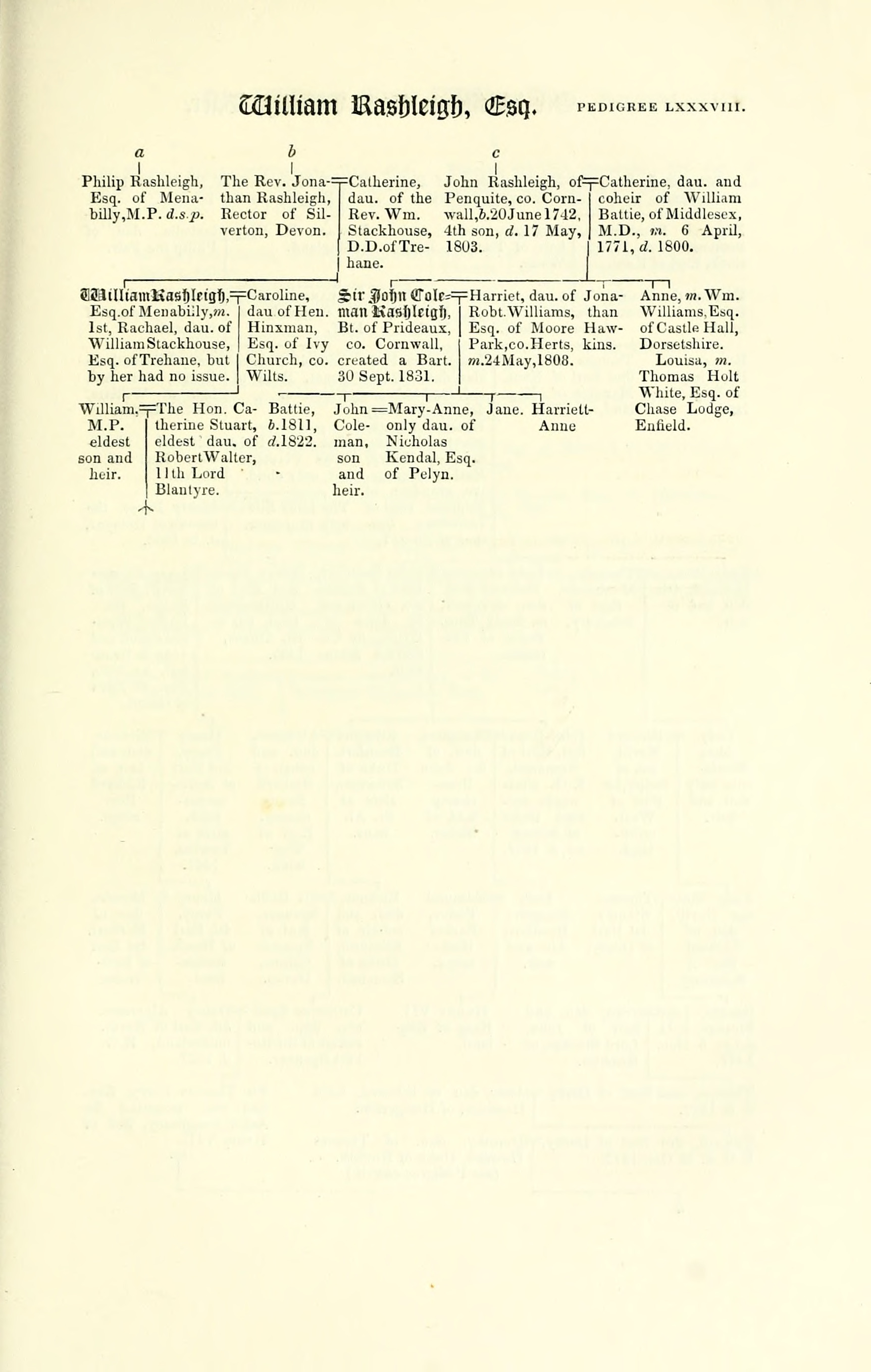

== Notable Rashleigh family members ==
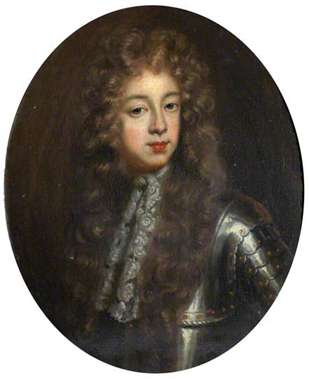
Jonathan Rashleigh (1642–1702), of Menabilly, Cornwall, Sheriff of Cornwall 1687 (painting previously thought to be Sir John Carew, 1635–1692, 3rd Bt). Painted c. 1685/90 by unknown artist of the English School. National Trust, Collection of Antony House, Cornwall

Charles Rashleigh

Charles Rashleigh (died 1823) was an entrepreneur. The expanding mining industry around West Polmear led him to develop Charlestown, Cornwall on the south coast as a port, which was named Charlestown after him.

Harold St. James Rashleigh-Berry

Rashleigh-Berry was Lt. Col in the British Army stationed in Peshawar, British Indian Empire. Rashleigh-Berry participated in the Second Anglo-Afghan War, under Sir Frederick Roberts.

John Rashleigh (1554–1624, Founder of Menabilly)

John Rashleigh (1554–1624) was an English merchant and Member of Parliament. He was the father of Jonathon Rashleigh and grandfather of John Rashleigh. John Rashleigh was the son of Phillip Rashleigh, a merchant, shipowner and landowner from Barnstaple. Phillip was himself the son of owner of the Rashleigh-Barton estate located in Devon which has been known to exist since 1196. After his father Phillip Rashleigh purchased the manor of Trenant in 1545, Phillip moved his family from Devon to Cornwall to take advantage of the dissolution of the monasteries by buying and re-selling the land acquired around Fowey, it was from this land that John Rashleigh commenced building Menabilly from land acquired in Fowey (from which Menabilly was later completed in its construction by his son Jonathan).

Jonathan Rashleigh (1591–1675)

Jonathan Rashleigh (4 July 1591 – 1 May 1675) was an English merchant and politician who sat in the House of Commons at various times between 1614 and 1675. He supported the Royalist cause during the English Civil War. Jonathan was also responsible for completing the construction of the family home of Menabilly.

John Rashleigh (1619–1693)

John Rashleigh (21 January 1619 – 13 March 1693) was an English politician who sat in the House of Commons from 1661 to 1679. He was the son of Jonathan Rashleigh and the grandson of John Rashleigh (the merchant and MP).

Jonathan Rashleigh (1642–1702)

This Jonathan Rashleigh (see painting to the right) was also based in Menabilly and was the Sheriff of Cornwall in 1687. He was the grandson of Jonathan Rashleigh the merchant and House of Commons politician.

Philip Rashleigh (1729–1811)

Philip Rashleigh (1729–1811) was a Cornish mineral expert and Member of Parliament for Fowey.

== Menabilly Estate ==
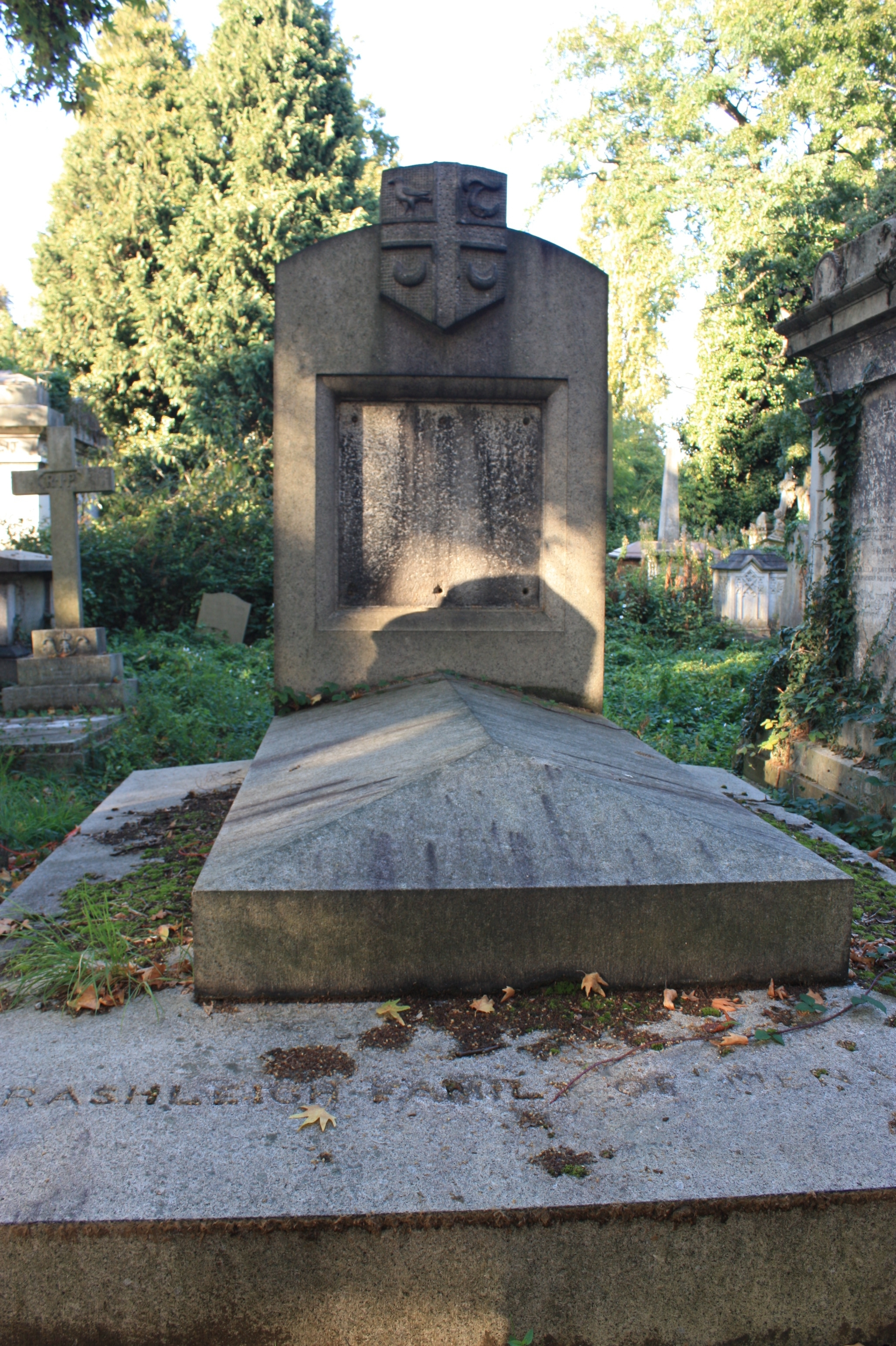
Rashleigh of Menabilly vault, Kensal Green Cemetery, London

In the Return of Owners of Land, 1873, Mr Jonathan Rashleigh of Menabilly Estate, Par, was listed as the largest landowner in Cornwall with an estate of 30,156 acres (122 km^{2}), or 3.97% of the total area of Cornwall. The estate contains pleasure grounds and a large country house which was Daphne du Maurier's inspiration for the house Manderley in her novel Rebecca.

== Sources ==
- Vivian, J.L. & Drake, H.H., The Visitation of the County of Cornwall in the year 1620, Harleian Society, 1st series, volume 9, London, 1874, p9.183-4, pedigree of Rashleigh
- Marshall, James C., Devon Notes & Queries, Volume IV Part VI, Exeter, April 1907, pp. 201–215, Rashleigh of Devon
