= Rashleigh, Wembworthy =

Historic manor in Devon, England

Coordinates: 50.9001°N 3.8900°W

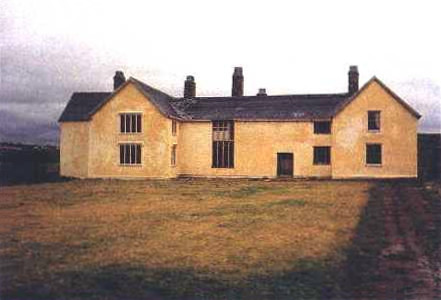
Rashleigh Barton, south front

Rashleigh is an historic former manor in the parish of Wembworthy, Devon. Rashleigh Barton, the former manor house, is a grade II* listed building, situated 5 miles north-east of the village of Wembworthy. It was the earliest known seat of the ancient Rashleigh family, a junior branch of which is still seated at Menabilly in Cornwall (see Rashleigh Baronets), and in the 16th century, on the failure of the male line, passed from the senior line of the Rashleigh family via a sole heiress to the Clotworthy family of Clotworthy in the same parish of Wembworthy.

== Sources ==
- Marshall, James C., Rashleigh of Devon, Devon Notes and Queries Volume IV, Part VI, April 1907, pp. 201-215
- Pevsner, Nikolaus & Cherry, Bridget, The Buildings of England: Devon, London, 2004, pp. 698–9, Rashleigh Barton
- Lauder, Rosemary Anne, A Tale of Two Rivers, Bideford, 1986, pp. 69–70, Rashleigh Barton
- Burke's Genealogical and Heraldic History of the Landed Gentry, 15th Edition, ed. Pirie-Gordon, H., London, 1937, pp. 1891–3, Rashleigh of Menabilly
- Vivian, Lt.Col. J.L., (Ed.) The Visitations of the County of Devon: Comprising the Heralds' Visitations of 1531, 1564 & 1620, Exeter, 1895, pp. 203–4, pedigree of Clotworthy of Clotworthy and of Rashleigh
