= George Cornelius Gorham =

English Anglican priest (1787–1857)

The Reverend George Cornelius Gorham
- Gorham in 1850
- Born: 21 August 1787; St Neots, England
- Died: 19 June 1857 (aged 69); Brampford Speke, England
- Education: Queens' College, Cambridge
- Known for: Being denied an ecclesiastical preferment due to his opinions concerning baptismal regeneration
- Religion: Christianity (Anglican)
- Church: Church of England
- Ordained: 1811 (deacon); 1812 (priest)
- Offices held: Vicar of St Just in Penwith (1846 – c. 1847); Vicar of Brampford Speke (1847–1857)

George Cornelius Gorham (1787–1857) was a priest in the Church of England. He was denied a vicarage due to his controversial views on infant baptism, and his appeal of that decision to a secular court caused religious controversy within the Anglican Church.

== Early life ==
George Cornelius Gorham was born on 21 August 1787 in St Neots, Huntingdonshire, to Mary (née Greame) and George James Gorham. He entered Queens' College, Cambridge, in 1805, graduating with a Bachelor of Arts degree as third wrangler and Smith's prizeman in 1809.

He was ordained as a deacon on 10 March 1811, despite the misgivings of the Bishop of Ely, Thomas Dampier, who found Gorham's opinions at odds with Anglican doctrine. Gorham's views on baptism had caused comment, particularly his contention that by baptism infants do not become members of Christ and the children of God. After being ordained as a priest on 23 February 1812 and serving as a curate in several parishes, he was instituted as vicar of St Just in Penwith by Henry Phillpotts, Bishop of Exeter, in 1846.

== Controversy ==
In 1847 Gorham was presented by the Earl of Cottenham, the Lord Chancellor, to the vicarage of Brampford Speke, a parish in a small Devon village near Exeter, which has a parish church dedicated to Saint Peter. The bishop (Henry Phillpotts) argued that Gorham's Calvinistic view of baptism made him unsuitable for the post. Gorham appealed to the ecclesiastical Court of Arches to compel the bishop to institute him but the court confirmed the bishop's decision and awarded costs against Gorham.

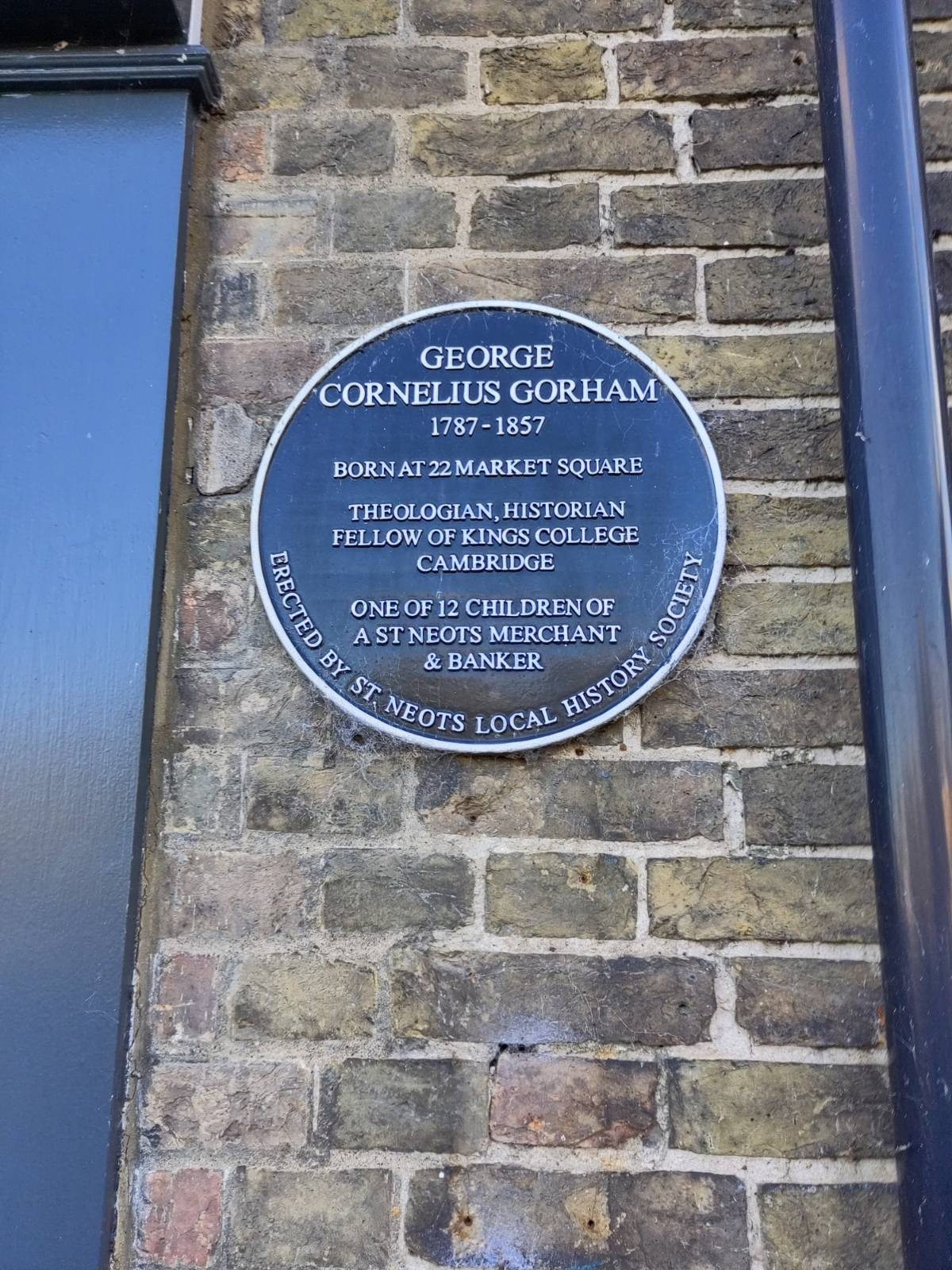
Plaque for George Cornelius Gorham in St Neots

Gorham then appealed to the Judicial Committee of the Privy Council, which caused great controversy about whether a secular court should decide the doctrine of the Church of England. The ecclesiastical lawyer Edward Lowth Badeley, a member of the Oxford Movement, appeared before the committee to argue the bishop's cause, but the committee (Knight Bruce, V-C dissenting) eventually reversed the bishop's and the Arches' decision on 8 March 1850 and granted Gorham his institution.

Phillpotts repudiated the judgment and threatened to excommunicate the archbishop of Canterbury and anyone who dared to institute Gorham. Fourteen prominent Anglicans, including Henry Edward Manning, requested that the Church of England repudiate the opinion that the Privy Council had expressed concerning baptism. As there was not any response from the Church apart from Phillpotts' protestations, they quit the Church of England and were received into the Catholic Church.

== Subsequent life ==
Gorham himself spent the rest of his life at his post in Brampford Speke. As vicar, Gorham restored the church building, entirely rebuilding the tower, for which Phillpotts gave some money. He was an antiquary and botanist of some reputation, as well as the author of a number of pamphlets. He died on 19 June 1857 in Brampford Speke.

== Publications ==
- George Cornelius Gorham, The History and Antiquities of Eynesbury and St. Neot's, in Huntingdonshire, and of St. Neot's in the county of Cornwall, 1820.

== See also ==
- Canon law of the Church of England
- Diocese of Exeter
