= John Speke (landowner) =

Sir John Speke
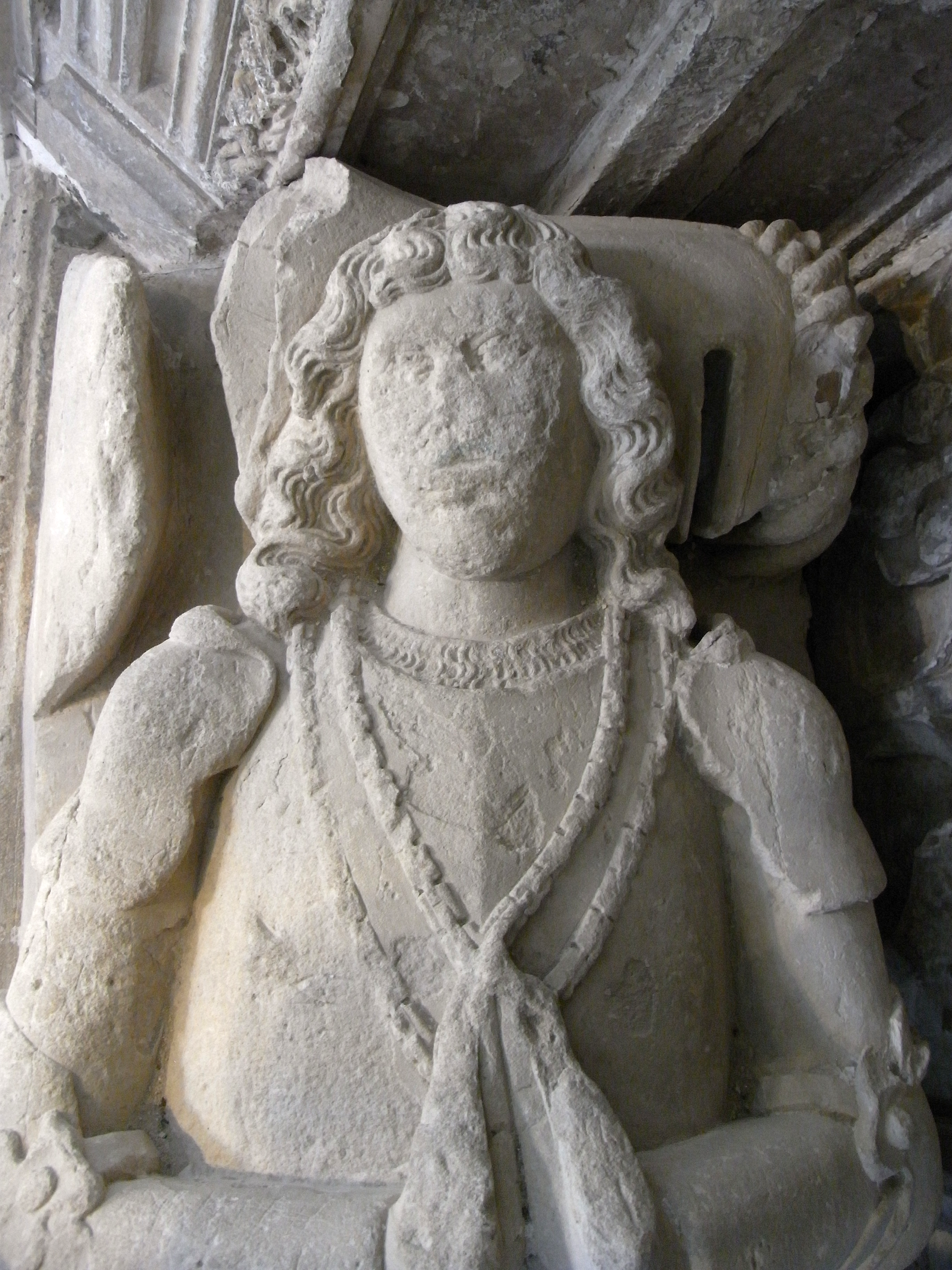
- Detail of Speke's effigy in the Speke Chantry, Exeter Cathedral
- Born: c.1442
- Died: 1518 (aged 75–76)
- Occupations: landowner, Sheriff of Devon, Member of Parliament
- Spouses: Joan Wynard, Isobel Calwodley, Elizabeth Somester
- Children: 3 sons, 2 daughters
- Parents: Sir John Speke (died 1444) (father); Alice Beauchamp (mother)
- Awards: knighted (1501)

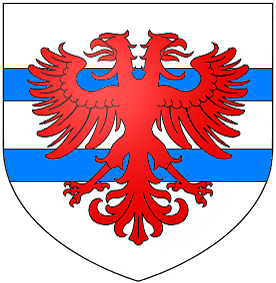
Speke arms: Argent, two bars azure over all an eagle with two heads displayed gules

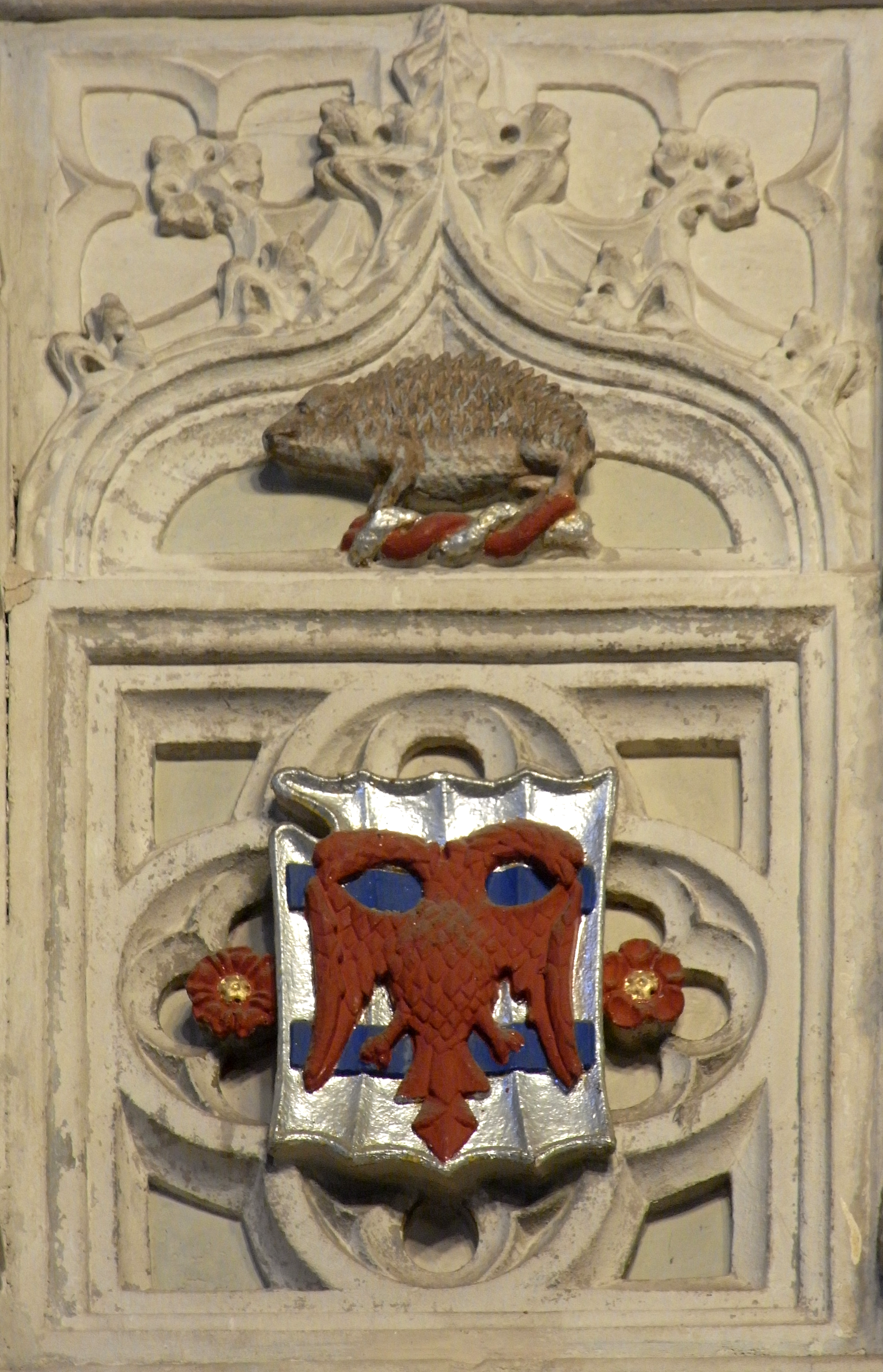
Decorated panel within Speke Chantry, Exeter Cathedral, showing on a spiked escutcheon à bouche the arms of Sir John Speke: Argent, two bars azure over all an eagle displayed with two heads gules; with canting crest (on a torse): A porcupine proper (French: porc-é(s)pic, ("spiky-pig"))

Sir John Speke (c.1442–1518) of Whitelackington, Somerset and of Heywood in the parish of Wembworthy and of Bramford Speke both in Devon, was Sheriff of Devon in 1517 and a Member of Parliament (1477). He was knighted in 1501. His monument is the Speke Chantry in Exeter Cathedral, in which he survives his recumbent effigy.

== Origins ==
He was born in about 1442, the son and heir of Sir John Speke (died 1444) (buried at Bramford Speke) of Wembworthy and Bramford Speke, Devon, by his wife Alice Beauchamp (died 1445/46) (who survived him and remarried to Henry Hull) daughter and heiress of John Beauchamp (son of Sir Thomas Beauchamp of Whitelackington, Ashill, etc.). (See Baron Beauchamp of Hatch, Somerset, descended from the Beauchamp feudal barons of Hatch Beauchamp, Somerset).

=== Family origins ===
The Speke family was of Norman origin and was originally called de Espec, de Spec, L'Espec, etc. Walter Espec (died 1153), Sheriff of Yorkshire, who died without children and whose relationship if any to the Speke family of Devon is unknown, was feudal baron of Helmsley in Yorkshire, and built Helmsley Castle and Wark Castle and founded Kirkham Priory and Rievaulx Abbey. According to Pole (died 1635), the family of de Espec, de Spec, L'Espec, etc, held the manor of Wembworthy, Devon, from soon after the Norman Conquest of 1066. Within the manor was their manor house and estate called Heywood, today the site of New Eggesford House. According to Pole the Spekes were "Men of very great estate and condicion", and were powerful in early Norman England, as appears from the style used by members of the family in their grants of land and other charters, one of which (exemplified in the cartulary of Torre Abbey) contains the following wording in Latin:

Ric(ard)us de Espeke balivis suis et omnibus hominibus suis Normanicis et Anglicis sal(utem). Sciatis me concessisse Osberto Probo et Michaeli fratri suo t(er)ram q(u)a(m) pater eor(um) de me tenuit in Daccombe et Wille, et volo quod Michaell et heredes sui de me teneant faciendo inde servicium duorum militum; et volo q(uo)d ita quiete teneant sicut frater eor(um) Will(ielmu)s tenuit die perex(i)it Jerusalem. ("Richard de Espeke to his bailiffs and to all his men Norman and English, greetings. Know ye all that I have granted to Osbert Probus (literally "The Upright/Honourable", Latinized form of Prouz/Prouse/Prowse) and to Michael his brother, the lands in Daccombe and Wille which the father of both held from me, and I desire that Michael and his heirs should hold from me by making therefor the service of two knights; and I desire that thus they should hold peaceably just as William their brother held on the day he perished in Jerusalem")

According to the Devon historian Thomas Westcote (c. 1567 – c. 1637):

"Ther are yet in remembrance certain by-paths over inclosed lands which they call 'Spekes-Paths' as lawful for him and his people to ride, go and drive that way, but for no other; but they ar all well neer forgotten and shut-up now".

The family is remembered today in the parish of Wembworthy by the crossroads near the parish church known as Speke's Cross. According to Tristram Risdon (died 1640) from the reign of King Henry I (1100–1135) to that of King Henry III (1216–1272) the heads of the Speke family were named alternately William and Richard.

== Wardship ==
His father died in 1444 when John was aged 2, and his wardship and marriage were granted by the crown jointly to William de la Pole, 1st Marquess of Suffolk (1396–1450) (later Duke of Suffolk), William Waynflete (c. 1398 – 1486), Provost of Eton (later Bishop of Winchester), and John Hampton (died 1472) of Kinver, Staffordshire, (whose monument was once in Kinver Church), Esquire of the Body to King Henry VI, all three of whom in 1442, together with others had been placed in charge of the foundation of Eton College by King Henry VI. It thus appears the revenue from his estates during his minority (until the age of 21) went towards the costs of establishing the king's foundation of Eton College.

== Career ==
He was a Member of Parliament (1477). Speke was also at one time the steward to the Earl of Devon. Following the Cornish rebellion of 1497, Henry VII's assessors fined him £200 allegedly for assisting the rebels, however he later obtained a pardon. Alongside him James Daubney (brother of the Lord Chancellor) was also fined £100, and Sir Hugh Lutterell £200. Speke was knighted in 1501. In 1517 he was Sheriff of Devon.

== Marriages and children ==
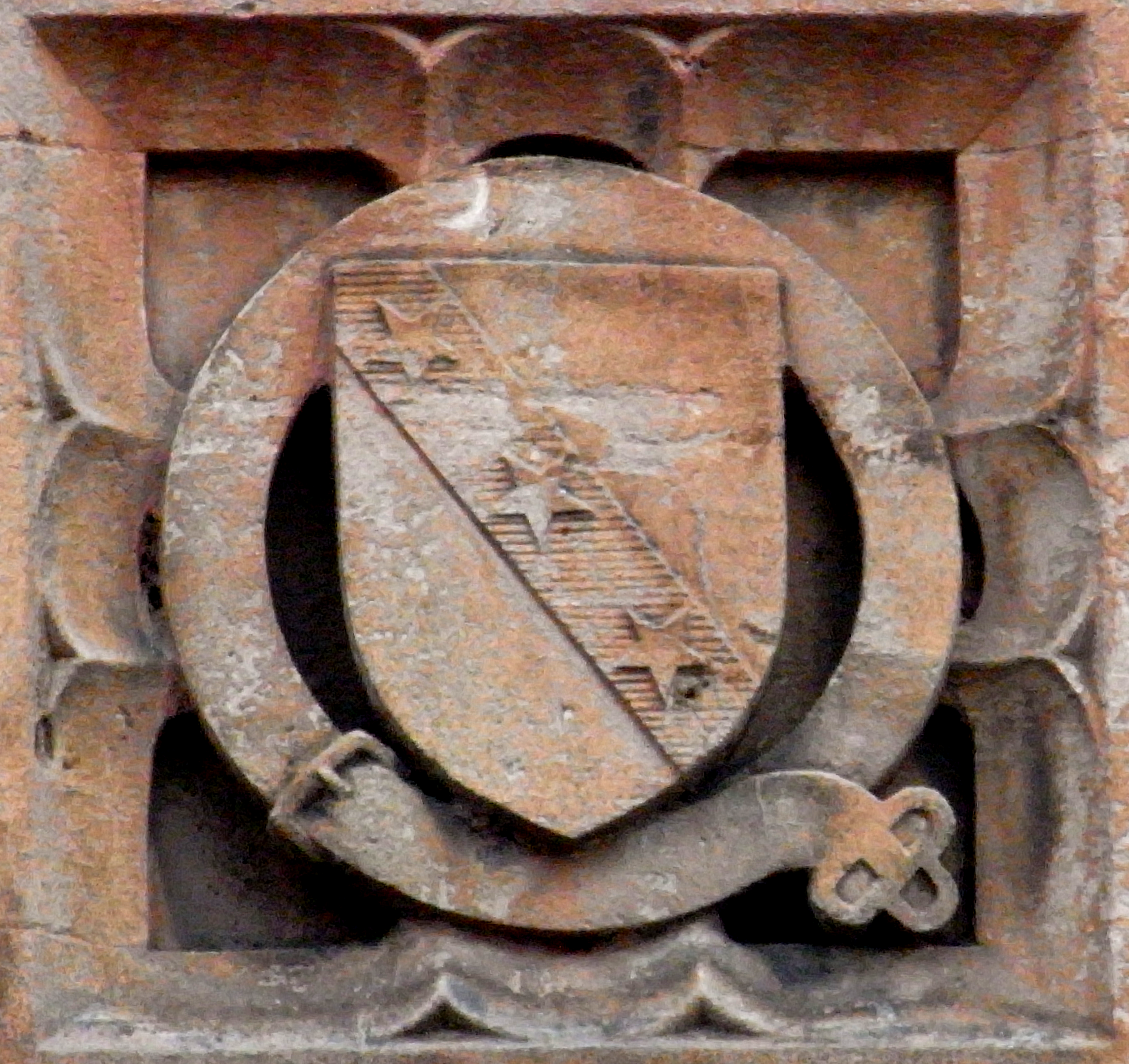
Arms of Wynard: Argent, on a bend azure three mullets of the first, ), exterior wall of Wynard's Hospital, Exeter

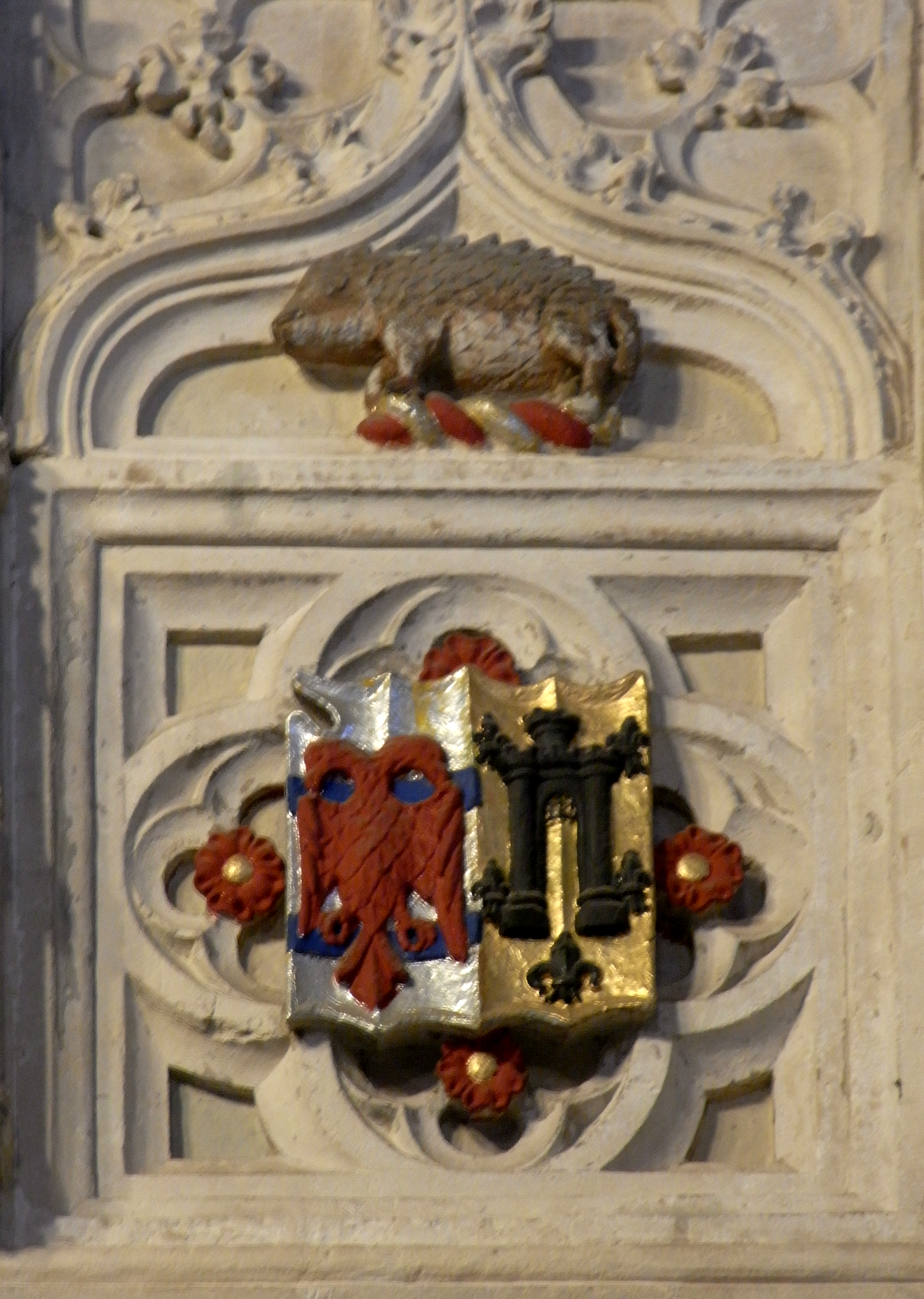
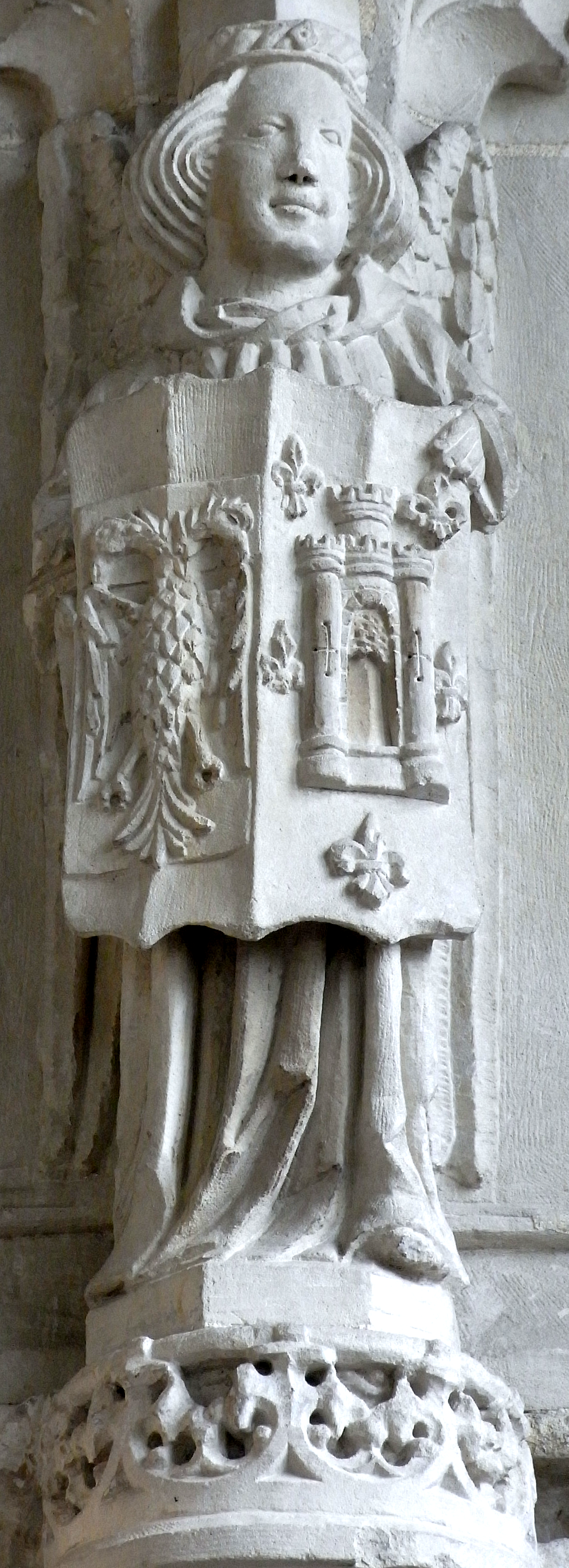
Left:Arms of Sir John Speke (died 1518) impaling Somester, arms of his 3rd wife Elizabeth Somester: Argent, a castle between three fleurs-de-lis sable (per Pole (died 1635)), here shown as Or, a castle between five fleurs-de-lis sable. Above is the crest of Speke: A porcupine. Outside wall of Speke Chantry, Exeter Cathedral. Right: same arms displayed by a statuette of a crowned angel, within the chantry

Speke married three times. His first marriage was to Joan Wynard, daughter and heiress of John Wynard of Exeter. Her ancestor was William Wynard (alias Wonard or Wenar), Recorder of Exeter (1404–1442), whose house was in South Street on the site of the present White Hart Inn, who founded Wynard's Almshouse or Hospital in Magdalen Street, Exeter (still standing), on 20 January 1436 together with the attached chapel of the Holy Trinity and Maison Dieu. The patronage of this hospital was inherited by John Speke from his first wife, and the arms of Speke quartering Wynard (Argent, on a bend azure three mullets of the first), occur on a shield in Wynard's Hospital in Exeter and in Seaton Church, Devon. By Joan Wynard he had three sons and one daughter:

- John Speke (c. 1468 – 1524), eldest son and heir, of Haywood and Whitelackington. He was harshly treated in his father's will by clauses attempting to prevent him from ejecting his father's widow from the lands he bequeathed to her. He married Alice Arundell, daughter of Sir Thomas Arundell of Lanherne, Cornwall, by whom he had a son and heir Thomas Speke (1508–1551), MP, father of George Speke (died 1584), KB, whose monumental brass survives in Whitelackington Church.
- Sir George Speke (died 1528) of Dowlish Wake, Sheriff of Somerset and Dorset in 1526. He married Elizabeth Ratcliff but died without issue. He was appointed by his father as executor of his will.
- Christopher Speke
- Alice Speke

Speke's second marriage, in about 1494, was to Isobel Calwodley, daughter of Thomas Calwodley and widow of John Beaumont; and his third wife was Elizabeth Somester, daughter of Adam Somester of Widecombe and widow successively of John Coleshill and Richard Unde, both of Exeter. By Elizabeth Somester he had a daughter, Anne.

== Landholdings ==
Lands held by him or by his ancestors included:

=== Devon ===
- Manor of Wembworthy, in which was Heywood
- Manor of Brushford (next to Wembworthy). In 1189 Robert de Spec granted the Rectory of Brushford to Hartland Abbey.
- Manor of Brampford Speke, 4 miles north of Exeter. The parish church of St Peter was granted by a Speke to St Nicholas' Priory, Exeter at some time before the reign of King Stephen (1135–1154).
- Wonford Speke
- Shevehayne (mod: Sheafhayne) and Paynshay in the parish of Yarcombe, near Axminster.
- Evelegh
- Thrusselton
- Soureton
- Milford
- Wampford, in the parish of Black Torrington, inherited from Keynes
- Witalegh/Whitalegh, in the parish of Black Torrington, inherited from Keynes
- Northcott, in the parish of Black Torrington, inherited from Keynes
- Buckland Brewer

=== Somerset ===
- Whitelackington, near Ilminster, inherited from his mother
- Dowlish Wake, 2 miles south of Ilminster, which came to the Speke family from his grandmother Joan Keynes, daughter and heiress of John Keynes of Dowlish Wake.
- Langford Fivehead, near Fivehead

== Death and burial ==
He died on 28 April 1518, having dated his will 20 February 1516/17. He was buried in the Speke Chantry of Exeter Cathedral.

=== Speke Chantry ===
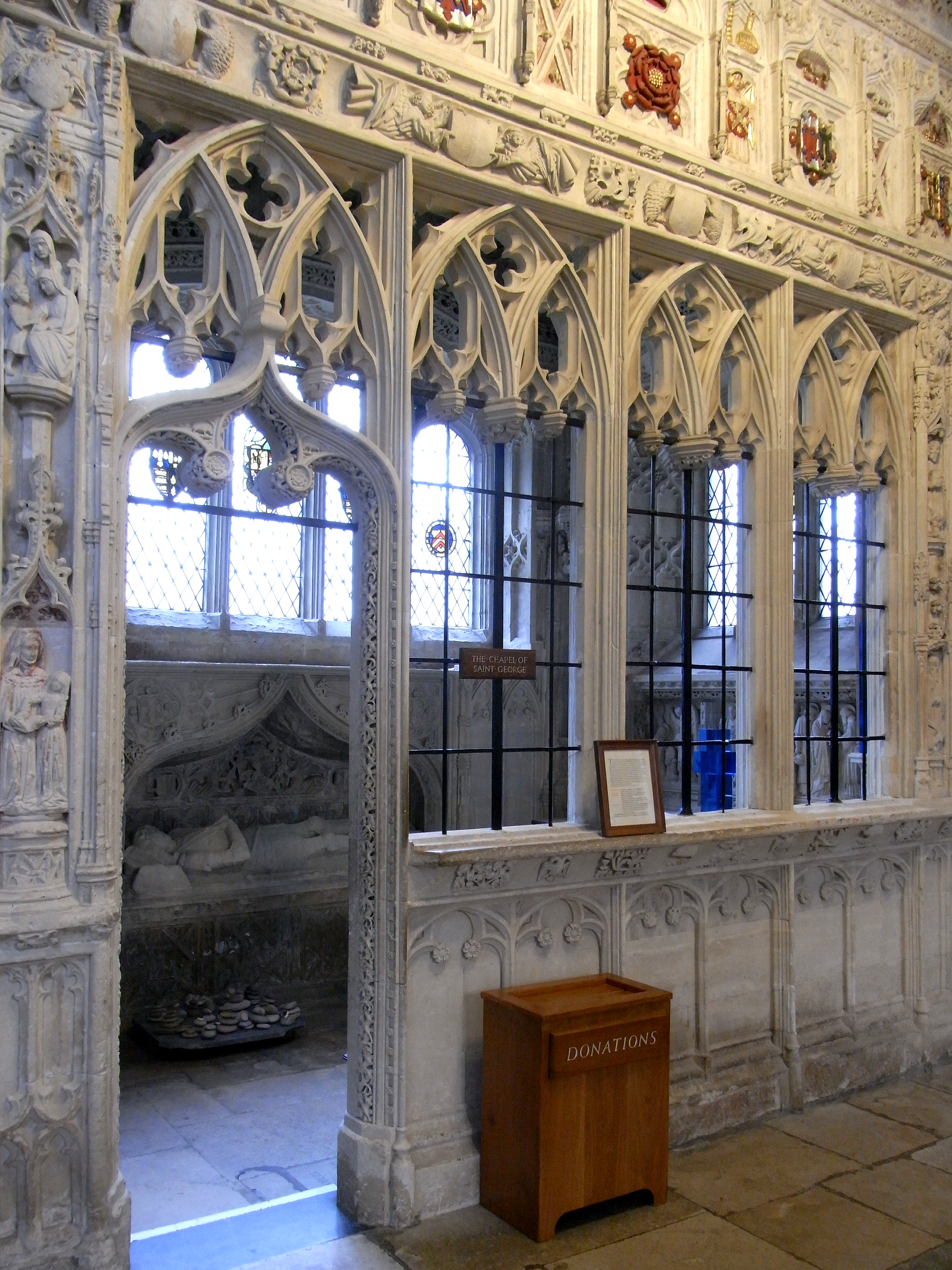
View into the Speke Chantry, Exeter Cathedral. Speke's effigy is visible under a recessed canopy

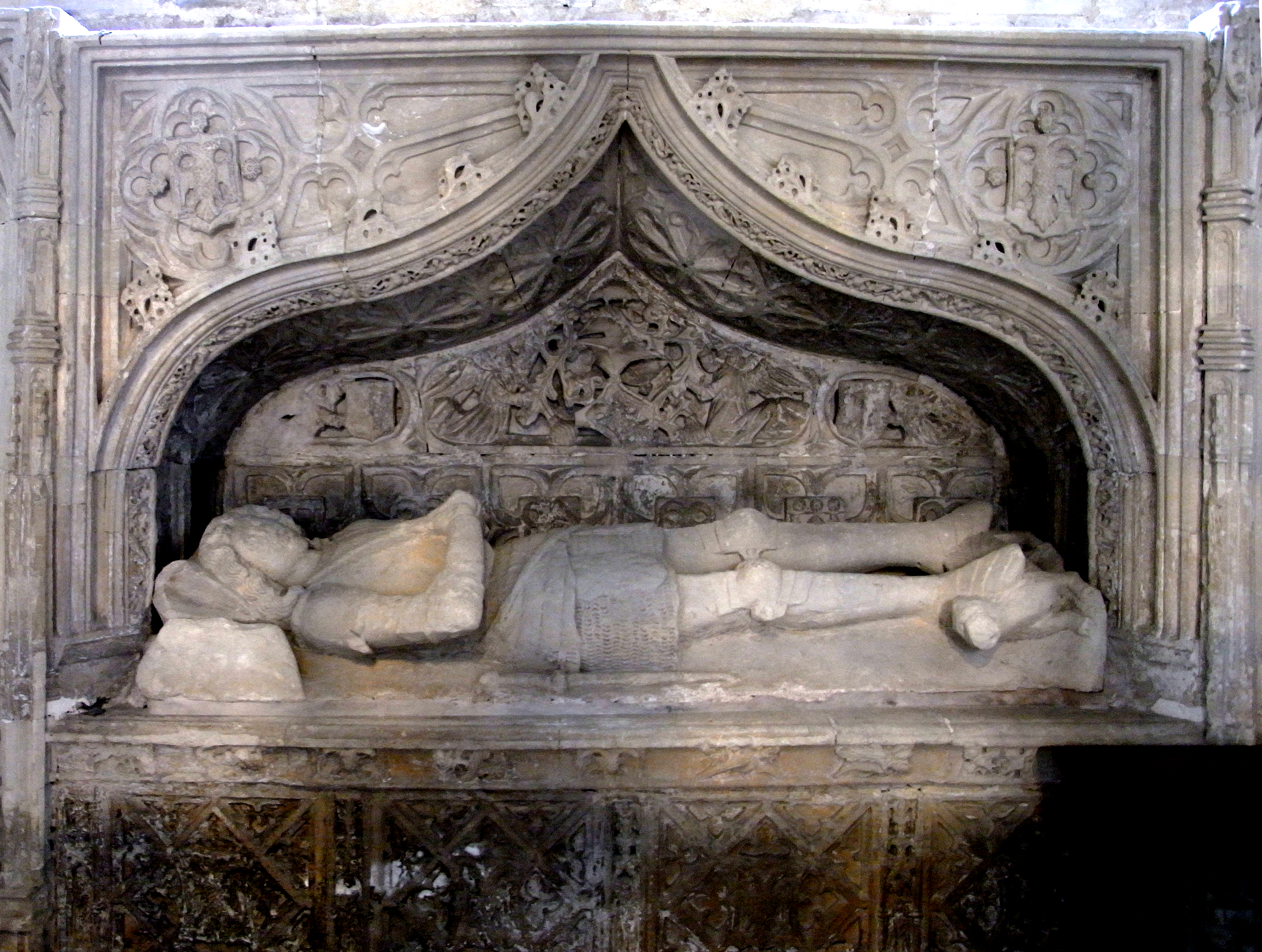
Recess with ogee canopy containing Speke's effigy. His feet rest on a porcupine, the Speke crest. In the spandrels each side and on the back wall are sculpted the Speke arms.

The Speke Chantry, called the "Chapel of St George" by its founder, is situated at the east end of the north choir aisle and forms a pair with the chantry of Bishop of Exeter Hugh Oldham (c. 1452 – 1519) at the east end of the south choir aisle. Both are protruded out to use space between two external buttresses of the building. Speke and the bishop were friends and the two chantries appear to have been planned by both men. The "owl" arms of Oldham appear on the outside wall of the Speke Chantry, with the arms of William Courtenay, 1st Earl of Devon (1475 – 1511), with above the rarely seen Courtenay heraldic badge of Jupiter as an eagle holding a thunderbolt. The first clause in his will was:

"Ffirst I bequeath my soule to Almighty God to his blessed mother Saint Mary and to all the celestial company of Hevyn, my body to be buried within the Cathedrall Church of Saint Petyr in Excetor within my Chapell of Saint George. Item I will that myn executor do ordeyn one thousand masses with placebo and dirige that it be sunge and said for my soule as soon as possible after my departing and my preest to have for his labour vi d but I will that ... of the masses ... dirige saide at my burying be ... for ... of that aforesaid".

Amongst the lands with which he had endowed his chancery (by conveying them to the Dean and Canons of Exeter Cathedral) was the manor of Langford Fivehead in Somerset. The text of his grant is as follows:

"To all to whom this present will shall come hear or see, John Speke sends greeting. The will and intent of me the said John Speke touching my manor of Langford Fivehead is that my trustees immediately after my death shall enfeoff the Dean and Canons Residentiary of the Cathedral Church of Exeter of and in the said manor to this use and intent: that they shall find yearly forever an honest and a sad priest to say and sing mass weekly and daily as often as he shall be thereunto disposed in the new Chapel of St George made and founded by me within the said Cathedral Church for the souls of me the said John Speke, my father and mother, my children, ancestors and special friends and for all Christian souls yielding and paying to the said priest yearly ten marks. 30 April 1518."

The recumbent effigy of Sir John Speke, dressed in full armour, lies within a canopied recess in the north wall. He is bare-headed with long wavy hair, his head resting on his helm. He wears two long chains around his neck and holds his hands together above his chest in prayer. The walls are highly decorated with relief sculpture in panels, with stone vaulted ceiling with pendants, "not an inch left unadorned". The decorations include much heraldry and several instances of the canting heraldic device of the Speke family, the porcupine, in French porc-épic, ("spiky-pig").

== Sources ==
- Burke's Genealogical and Heraldic History of the Landed Gentry, 15th Edition, ed. Pirie-Gordon, H., London, 1937, pp. 2103–4, pedigree of Speke of Jordans
- Risdon, Tristram (died 1640), Survey of Devon, 1811 edition, London, 1811, with 1810 Additions, pp. 294–5, Heywood
- Pole, Sir William (died 1635), Collections Towards a Description of the County of Devon, Sir John-William de la Pole (ed.), London, 1791, pp. 424–5, Heywood/Wemworthy, pp. 235–6, Branford Speake
