= Brampford Speke =

Village in Devon, England

Coordinates: 50.776°N 3.525°W

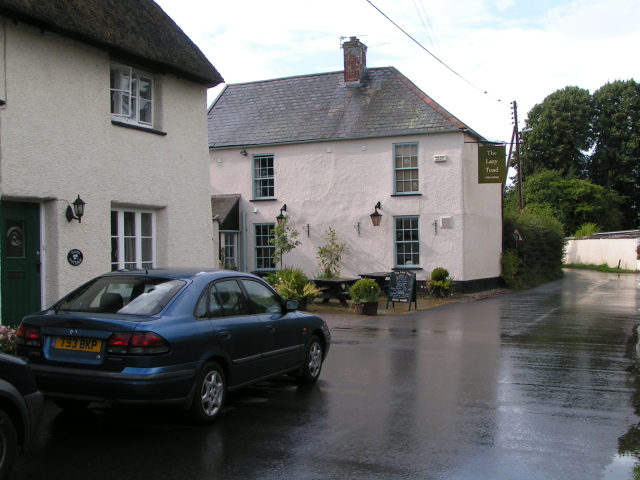
The pub in Brampford Speke

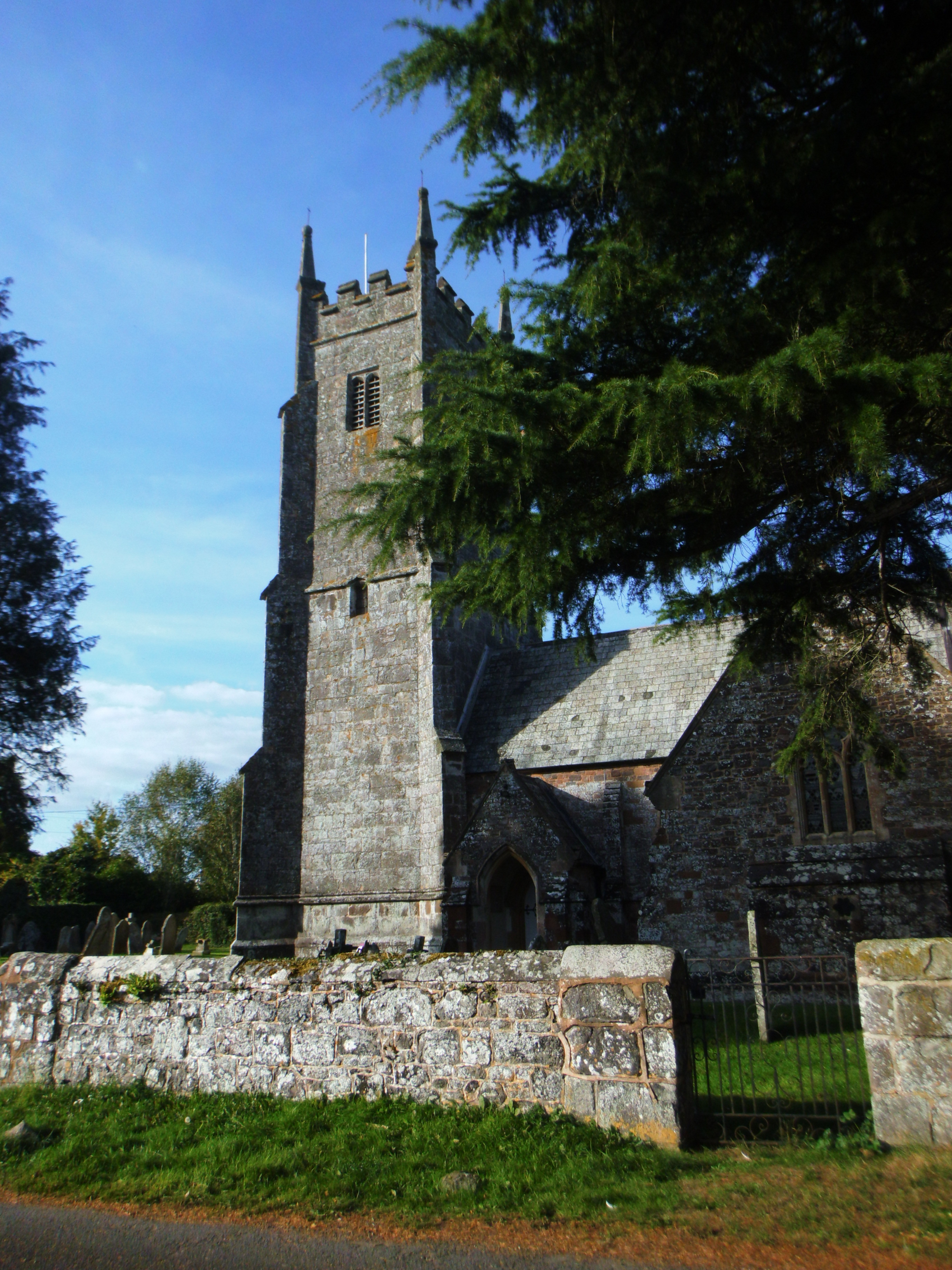
Brampford Speke Parish Church

Brampford Speke (/ˈbræmfərdzbiːk/ BRAM-fərdz-beek) is a small village in Devon, 4 miles (6 km) to the north of Exeter. The population is 419. It is located on red sandstone cliffs overlooking the river Exe. Its sister village of Upton Pyne lies to its southwest, and Stoke Canon is across the river, to the east. To the south is the hamlet of Cowley with its chapel of ease, which was formerly part of the ecclesiastical parish of Brampford Speke.

Brampford Speke has a Church of England parish church dedicated to St Peter. There is a primary school in the heart of the village near the river Exe, which was built as a national school in 1867. A baptist chapel was built near the school in 1894. The village also has a corner shop/tea room and a local pub, the Agricultural Inn (formerly the Lazy Toad). The village contains a number of fine houses, including the former landowner's Brampford House in the centre of the village and some traditional cob and thatch cottages and farmhouses.

== History ==
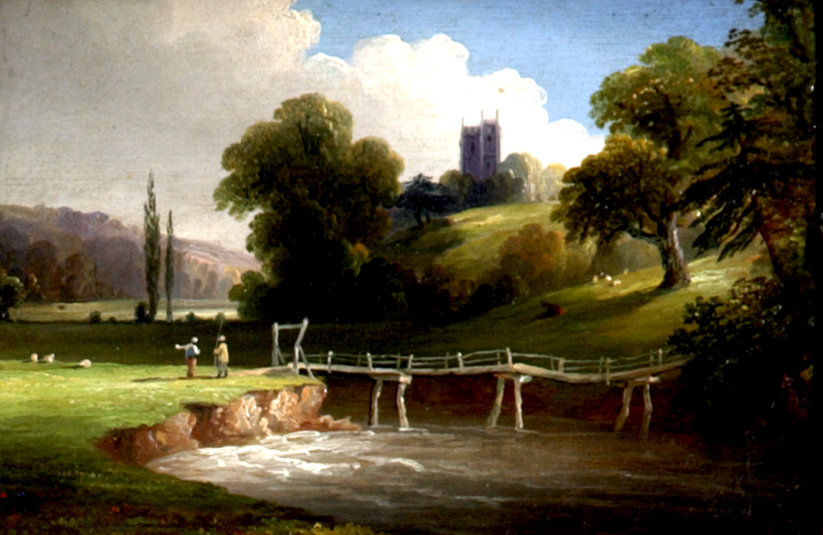
Brampford Speke Bridge by John Wallace Tucker, 1865 - 1867

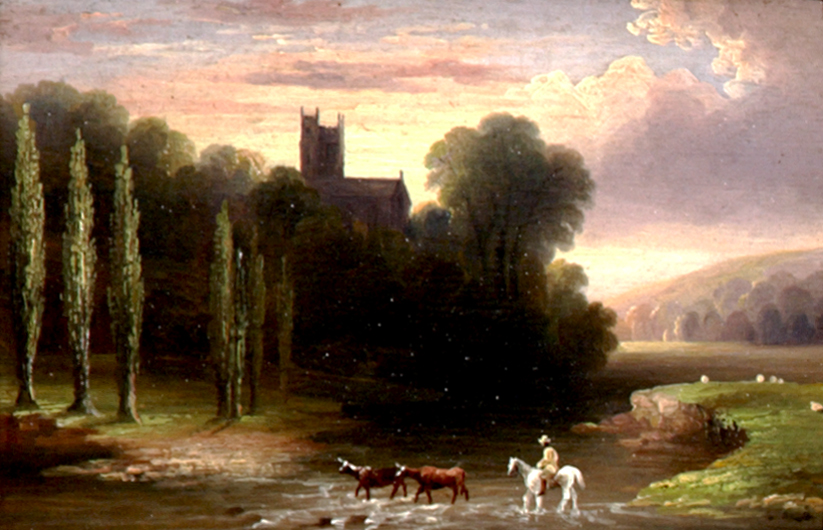
Brampford Speke River Exe by John Wallace Tucker, 1865 - 1867

The village's name perhaps means 'bramble ford'. Speke is derived from the Anglo-Norman family Espek or Speke lords of the manor from the reign of King Stephen (1135–1154). The Speke Chantry in Exeter Cathedral contains the effigy of Sir John Speke (1442–1518) of Heywood in Wembworthy and Brampford Speke in Devon and of Whitelackington in Somerset. In 1815, the manor was purchased for the Northcote family, later Earls of Iddesleigh.

George Cornelius Gorham was recommended as vicar of the parish of Brampford Speke in 1847. However, when examined by the bishop of Exeter, Henry Phillpotts, he was declared to hold Calvinist views on baptismal regeneration. The bishop's decision was later overturned by the Judicial Committee of the Privy Council, and Gorham was instituted as vicar of Brampford Speke. The furore led some to abandon the Church of England to become Roman Catholics. As vicar, Gorham restored the church building, entirely rebuilding the tower, for which Bishop Phillpotts gave some money. The church's north aisle had been added in 1840. A marble tablet on the east wall of the south transept commemorates Gorham.

== Railway Line ==
Brampford Speke was served by the Exe Valley line of the Great Western Railway, which opened on 1 May 1885, until the Beeching Axe of 7 October 1963 closed its station. Both the old railway station and the old station house remain in residential use, and are situated across the river from the village. An iron footbridge over the river Exe connects a path from the school, down the cliff and across the meadow to the station. The current bridge is the third. The old railway embankment can be walked to Stoke Canon, whereas the line to Thorverton is now impassable due to collapsed bridges.

== Notable residents ==
The biologist Dr Richard Parnell FRSE (1810–1882), who gives his name to Parnell's moustached bat, was born here.
