= Wembworthy =

Village in Devon, England

Coordinates: 50°52′21″N 3°54′06″W

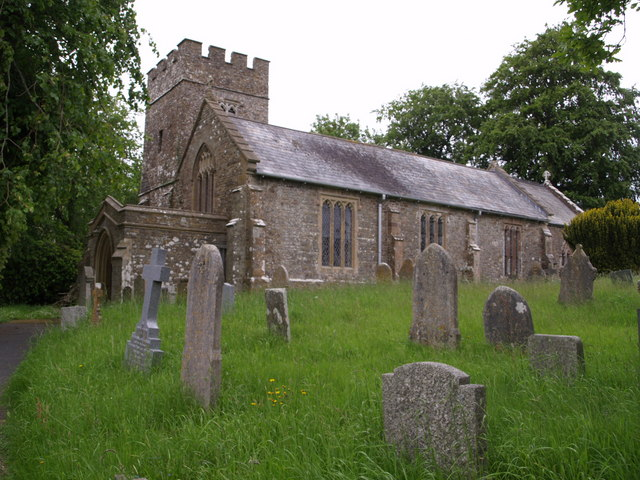
St Michael's Church, Wembworthy

Wembworthy is a small village, parish and former manor in Mid-Devon, England. It is situated in the valley of the River Taw, 8 miles north-east of the towns of Hatherleigh and 12 miles south of South Molton. St Michael's Church is the parish church, much rebuilt in the 1840s. The vestigial remnants of two mediaeval earthwork castles survive within the parish, one in Heywood Wood, of motte and bailey form, the other to its south of ringwork and bailey form.

== History ==
In the time of Tristram Risdon (d.1640), Wembworthy was merely a tithing of the adjacent parish of Brushford, and was thus not apparently a parish of itself.

== Historic estates ==
- Heywood, now the site of New Eggesford House, for many centuries the seat of the Speke family, later of Whitelackington in Somerset. The Speke Chantry in Exeter Cathedral contains the effigy of Sir John Speke (1442-1518) of Heywood and Brampford Speke in Devon and of Whitelackington. It was said by Risdon (d. 1640) that a secret underground passage connected Heywood House with the ancient motte and bailey Heywood Castle. The present building known as Heywood House was built in the mid-19th century in the Tudor Gothic style as a cottage orné by Newton Fellowes, 4th Earl of Portsmouth (1772–1854), builder of New Eggesford House.
- Rashleigh, historic seat of the ancient Rashleigh family, a junior branch of which is still seated at Menabilly in Cornwall (see Rashleigh Baronets), and later inherited by the Clotworthy family formerly of nearby Clotworthy.
