= Rashleigh baronets =

Baronetcy in the Baronetage of the United Kingdom

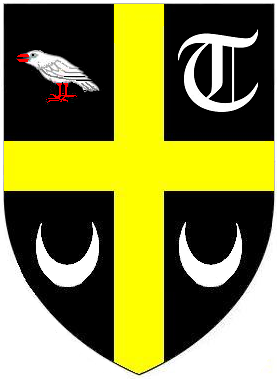
Arms of Rashleigh of Cornwall: Sable, a cross or between in the first quarter: a Cornish chough, argent beaked and legged gules; in the second quarter: a text "T"; in the third and fourth quarters: a crescent all of the third

The Rashleigh Baronetcy, of Prideaux in the County of Cornwall, is a title in the Baronetage of the United Kingdom. It was created on 30 September 1831 for John Rashleigh. The second Baronet sat as member of parliament for Cornwall East. The 6th baronet resides at Menabilly near Fowey, Cornwall, formerly the seat of his cousins the senior line of the Rashleighs of Cornwall since the 16th century.

== Rashleigh baronets, of Prideaux (1831) ==
- Sir John Colman Rashleigh, 1st Baronet (1772–1847)
- Sir Colman Rashleigh, 2nd Baronet (1819–1896)
- Sir Colman Battie Rashleigh, 3rd Baronet (1846–1907)
- Sir Colman Battie Walpole Rashleigh, 4th Baronet (1873–1951)
- Sir Harry Evelyn Battie Rashleigh, 5th Baronet (1923–1984)
- Sir Richard Harry Rashleigh, 6th Baronet (born 1958)

The heir apparent is the present holder's son David William Augustine Rashleigh (born 1997).

Baronetage of the United Kingdom
Preceded by Otway baronets	Rashleigh baronets of Prideaux; 30 September 1831	Succeeded by Slade baronets
