= Menabilly =

Country estate in Cornwall, England

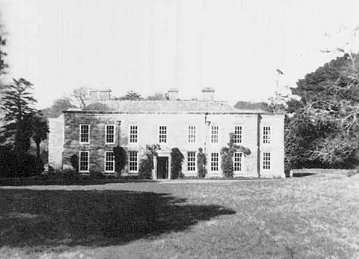

- Location within Cornwall
- 50.3297°N 4.6706°W
- Location: Fowey, Cornwall, England

Listed Building – Grade II*
- Official name: Menabilly House
- Designated: 13 March 1951
- Reference no.: 1210574

Listed Building – Grade II
- Official name: West Lodge, north west of Menabilly House
- Designated: 11 March 1974
- Reference no.: 1210508

National Register of Historic Parks and Gardens
- Official name: Menabilly
- Designated: 11 June 1987
- Reference no.: 1000651

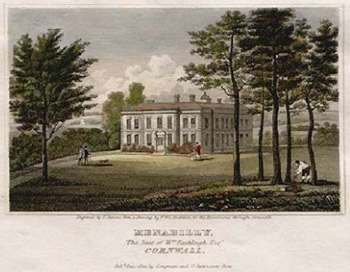
"Menabilly the seat of ...Rashleigh, Esq., Cornwall". Antique print.

Menabilly (Cornish: Menabili, meaning hill-slope of pebbles) is a historic estate on the south coast of Cornwall, England, situated within the parish of Tywardreath on the Gribben peninsula about 2 miles (3.2 km) west of Fowey.

It has been the seat of the Rashleigh family from the 16th century to the present day. The mansion house, which received a Grade II* listing on 13 March 1951, is early Georgian in style, having been re-built on the site of an earlier Elizabethan house, parts of which were possibly incorporated into the present structure. The house is surrounded by woodland and nearby is the farmhouse Menabilly Barton. In the Return of Owners of Land, 1873 Jonathan Rashleigh of Menabilly, Par, was listed as the largest landowner in Cornwall with an estate of 30,156 acres (122.0 km^{2}) or almost 4% of the total area of Cornwall.

== Rashleigh family seat ==
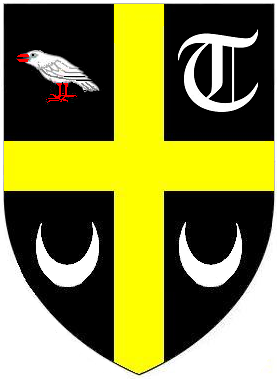
Arms of Rashleigh: Sable, a cross or between in the first quarter: a Cornish chough, argent beaked and legged gules; in the second quarter: a text "T"; in the third and fourth quarters: a crescent all of the third.

The Rashleigh family of Menabilly originated as powerful merchants in the 16th century. In 1545 Philip Rashleigh (died 1551), a younger son of the Rashleigh family of Barnstaple in Devon, who had become wealthy through trade, purchased the manor of Trenant near Fowey from the King after the Dissolution of the Monasteries. His two sons Robert and John founded the Rashleigh family of Fowey. The land on which Menabilly was built has been owned by the Rashleigh family since the 1560s. In 1589 the building of the first house at Menabilly was commenced by John Rashleigh (1554–1624), shipowner, MP for Fowey in 1589 and 1597, Sheriff of Cornwall 1608–1609, who captained his own ship Francis of Foy against the Spanish Armada in 1588. The house was completed in 1624 by his son Jonathan Rashleigh (1591–1675), five times MP for Fowey and a Royalist during the Civil War. It was re-built between 1710 and 1715 by Jonathan Rashleigh III (1693–1764).

In national politics the Rashleighs of Menabilly obtained a voice in parliament because of their power to elect members of parliament for the pocket borough of Fowey. The electors consisted of the portreeve and commonalty (or burgesses), and the family purchased several of the freehold properties in the borough to which the right to vote as burgesses was attached. Thus they and their cousins the Rashleighs of Combe, Fowey, with their combined property holdings, controlled 12 votes in the 1570s and in 1650 controlled 15 votes, corresponding to the number of freehold properties in the borough manor owned by them in 1649. Members of the Rashleigh family frequently used their influence as landlords of these properties to have themselves elected to parliament as members for Fowey.

== Description of house ==
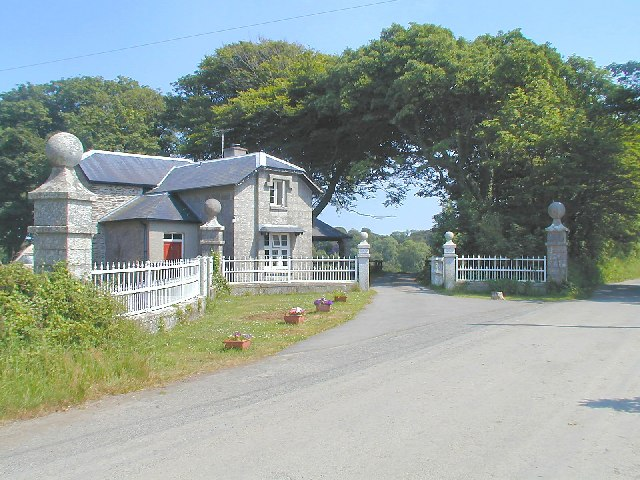
Gatehouse of Menabilly

The present house is of two storeys built around a central courtyard with a six-bay front on which the central 3 bays break forward.

Philip Rashleigh (1729–1811) landscaped the gardens and planted the woodland around the house and estate. William Rashleigh, his nephew, succeeded after Philip's death in 1811, and following a fire in 1822 rebuilt the house greatly extended in size.

Jonathan Rashleigh (1820–1905), improved and extended the gardens and grounds and planted many trees including pine, cedar, eucalyptus and beech. He also planted rhododendron, bamboo and hydrangea.

John Rashleigh, grandson of Jonathan, succeeded in 1905 but rarely lived at Menabilly which thus fell into serious decay. In 1943 it was discovered in a dilapidated state by the new tenant, author Daphne du Maurier, who set about restoring it and made it her home before returning it to the Rashleighs in 1969.

== Descent of estate ==
=== John Rashleigh (died 1582) ===
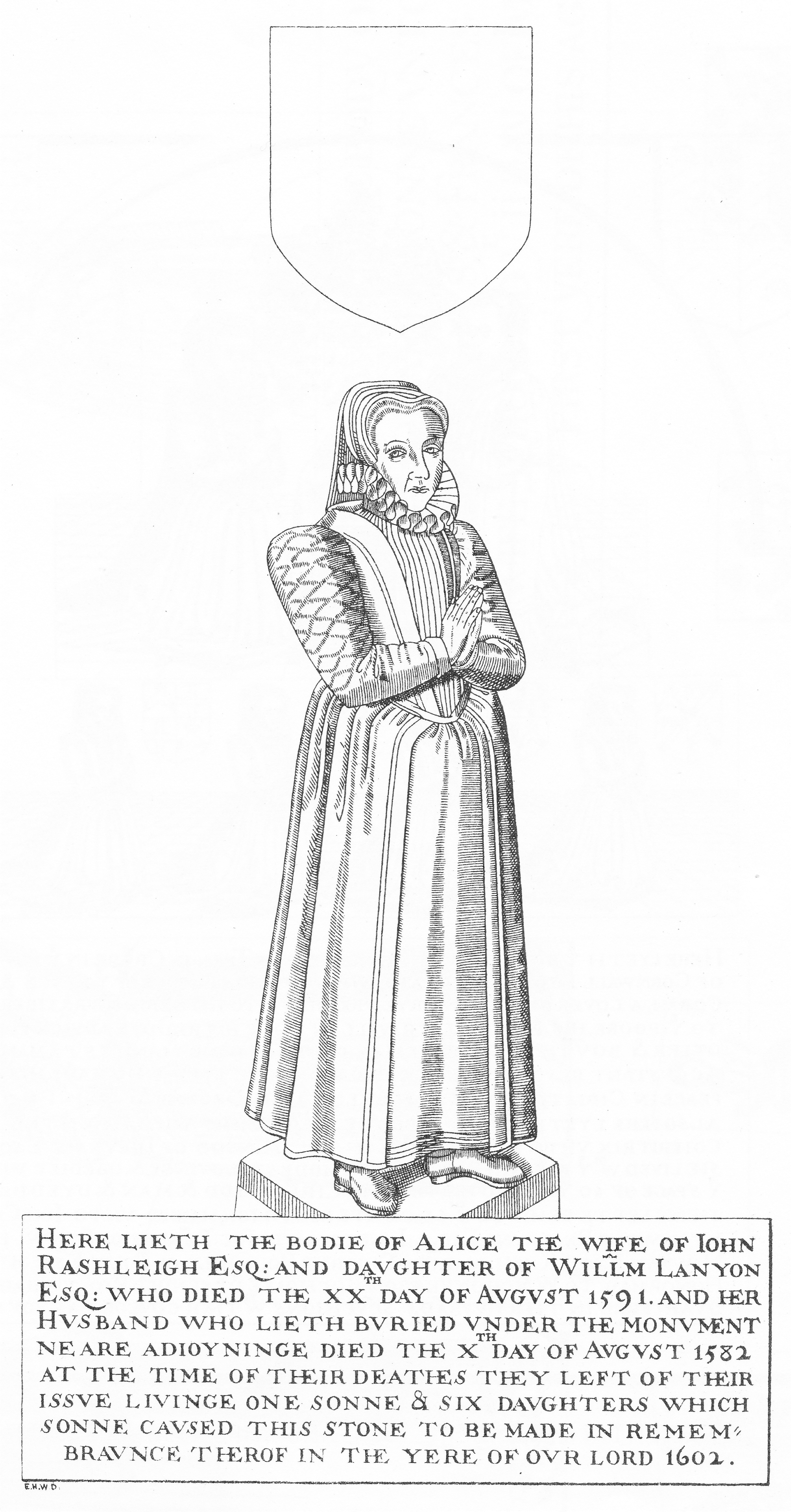
1602 Monumental brass of Alice Lanyon (died 1591), wife of John I Rashleigh (died 1582), Fowey Church.

John Rashleigh (died 1582), a merchant at Fowey in Cornwall in 1573 purchased from Christopher Copleston (died 1586) of Copleston in Devon, the estate of Menabilly, together with Treswethick, Trewrong and Penpol. He was the second son of Philip I Rashleigh (died 1551) of Fowey. He married Alice Lanyon (died 20 August 1591) (whose 1602 monumental brass survives in Fowey Church,) daughter of William Lanyon by his wife Thomasine Tregian, daughter of Thomas Tregian.

=== John Rashleigh (1554–1624) ===
John Rashleigh II (1554–1624), son, builder of the first house at Menabilly, shipping-merchant, MP for Fowey in 1588 and 1597, and High Sheriff of Cornwall in 1608.

=== Jonathan Rashleigh (1591–1675) ===
Jonathan Rashleigh (1591–1675), second son and heir, his elder brother John Rashleigh (1582 – May 1624), presumed insane, having died one month after their father, who left instructions in his will for his care to his second son, executor and heir Jonathan: "keep and maintain his brother John, allowing him a chamber, meat, drink, apparel and all other necessities and a servant continually to attend him".

Jonathan was elected MP for Fowey in 1614, 1621 and 1625, and retained his seat until the start of the Civil War of 1641–1651 during which Menabilly was ransacked of livestock, furniture and stores. After the execution of King Charles I Jonathan was imprisoned at St Mawes Castle and his estate became bankrupt from the war and parliamentarian taxes. Jonathan's son John Rashleigh (1621–1651), MP for Fowey in 1661, pre-deceased his father, having married Joan Pollexfen and produced male issue, and thus after Jonathan's death in 1675 his heir was his grandson Jonathan Rashleigh (1642–1702).

=== Jonathan Rashleigh (1642–1702) ===
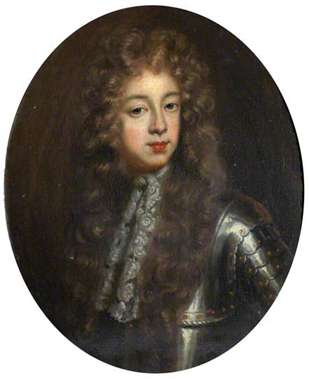
Jonathan Rashleigh (1642–1702), of Menabilly, Sheriff of Cornwall 1686. (Previously thought to be his father-in-law Sir John Carew, 3rd Baronet (died 1692) of Antony). Painted c. 1685/90 by unknown artist of the English School. National Trust, Collection of Antony House, Cornwall.

Jonathan Rashleigh (1642–1702), grandson, Sheriff of Cornwall in 1686/1687, and several times MP for Fowey, of whom a portrait exists at Antony House, Torpoint, Cornwall, the home of his second wife Jane Carew, daughter of Sir John Carew, 3rd Baronet (1635–1692) of Antony. After his death in 1702 the estate was inherited by his eldest son by his second wife Jane Carew, Philip II Rashleigh (1689–1736).

=== Philip Rashleigh (1689–1736) ===
Philip Rashleigh II (1689–1736) was the eldest son and heir of Jonathan Rashleigh (1642–1702) by his second wife Jane Carew. He served as MP for Liskeard 1710–1722. He rebuilt Menabilly circa 1710–1715. He was a supporter of the Jacobite Pretender. He died in 1736 without progeny.

=== Jonathan Rashleigh (1693–1764) ===
Jonathan Rashleigh (1693–1764), younger brother. He was the fourth son of Jonathan Rashleigh II (1642–1702), by his second wife Jane Carew. He served as MP for Fowey. He married in 1728 Mary Clayton, daughter of Sir William Clayton, 1st Baronet, of Marden Park in Surrey, MP for Bletchingley. His fourth son John Rashleigh (1742–1803) of Penquite, Cornwall, was the father of Sir John Colman Rashleigh, 1st Baronet (1772–1847) of Prideaux, Cornwall. He was a co-heir (together with his sister's grandson Reginald Pole-Carew (died 1835), whose share included Antony) of his half first cousin Sir Coventry Carew, 6th Baronet (c. 1716–1748) of Antony, from whom he inherited several estates including East Antony, Manely Durnford, Langunnet, Little Deviock, Sheviock, Nancolleth, Pensignance, Penventon, Helsett, Drewsteignton and Notter. Furthermore, after the death of Lady Carew in 1762 he inherited further properties, namely Roserrow In St. Minver and Davidstow, Tregollen In St. Minver and Davidstow, Trelander In St. Minver and Davidstow, Grays In St. Minver and Davidstow, Rosebenault In St.Minver and Davidstow, Newham stream works and St. Veep woods.

=== Philip Rashleigh (1729–1811) ===
Philip Rashleigh (1729–1811), eldest son and heir, MP for Fowey. He was a renowned mineralogist who wrote many books on the subject and a well-known collector of mineral samples, for the storage of which he dedicated a room at Menabilly. Philip also started a coin collection which became one of the largest in the country. He landscaped the gardens and built the grotto at Polridmouth said to be made of "every variety of English and foreign stones and shell" and also planted the woodland around the house and elsewhere on the estate. In 1782 he married his cousin Jane Pole (died 1795), daughter of Rev. Carolus Pole by his wife Sarah Rashleigh, but died without issue, when his heir became his nephew William Rashleigh (1777–1855).

=== William Rashleigh (1777–1855) ===
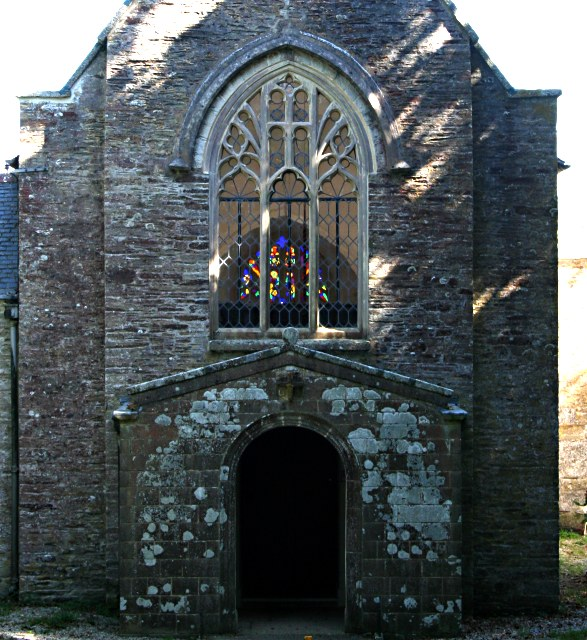
Tregaminion Chapel

William Rashleigh (1777–1855), nephew, MP for Fowey 1812–1818, Sheriff of Cornwall in 1818. He was a member of the Church Missionary Society and built Tregaminion Chapel. In 1822 a fire broke out which led him to greatly extend the house.

It was during these alterations, his architect noticed that the buttress against the north wall was not supporting anything and demolished it, whereupon steps were uncovered leading to a small cell where they found the body of a Cavalier, and following research discovered that certain members of the Grenville family of Stowe in Cornwall, had sought sanctuary from the Parliamentarian forces during the civil war.

In 1816 he married secondly Caroline Hinxman, daughter of Henry Hinxman of Ivychurch, Wiltshire.

=== William Rashleigh (1817–1871) ===
William Rashleigh (1817–1871), eldest son by second marriage, JP, DL and MP for East Cornwall 1841–1847. He travelled in the Middle East and whilst in Egypt he met a sheikh in Cairo who on hearing the name Rashleigh asked if he knew Philip Rashleigh and told him that many years before as a prisoner of war in England Philip had invited him to Menabilly many times. In 1843 he married Hon. Catherine Stuart (died 1872), eldest daughter of the Scottish peer Robert Walter Stuart, 11th Lord Blantyre (1777–1830). He left no male progeny and was succeeded by his brother Jonathan Rashleigh (1820–1905).

=== Jonathan Rashleigh (1820–1905) ===
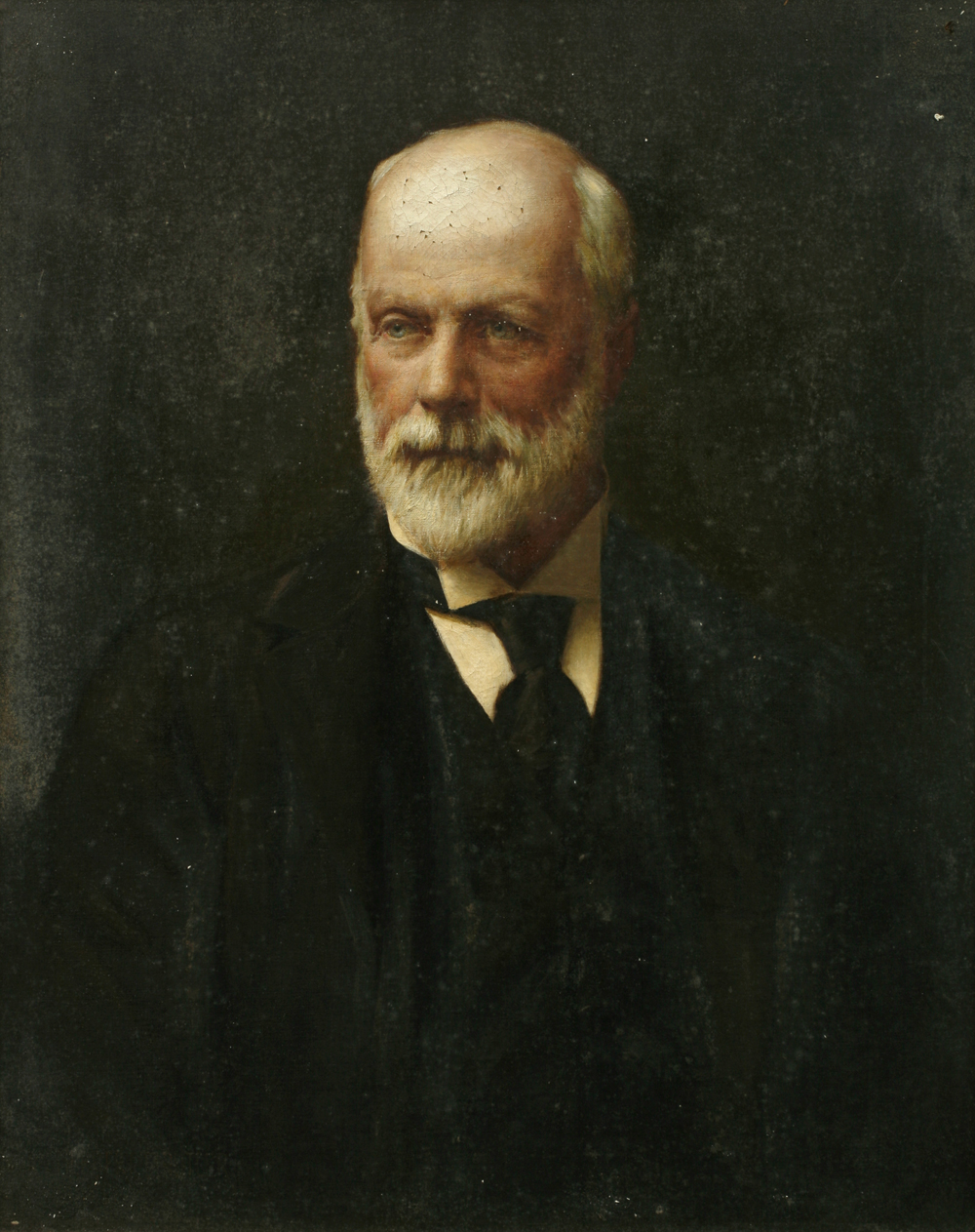
Evelyn William Rashleigh (1850–1926), of Stoketon, Saltash, Cornwall, younger son of Jonathan Rashleigh (1820–1905) of Menabilly.) Royal Cornwall Museum, Truro.

Jonathan Rashleigh (1820–1905), brother of William Rashleigh (1817–1871), of Menabilly, Feniton Court in Devon, and Lissadrone, County Mayo, Ireland, the latter were the lands that were absorbed after his second marriage to Jane Elizabeth Pugh (1836–1902), daughter of Arthur Pugh, of Lissadrone, Co. Mayo.

After education at Harrow School (1836) and at Balliol College, Oxford (BA 1842), he made an early first marriage on 1 August 1843 to Mary Pole Stuart (1823–1852), daughter of William Stuart, of Aldenham Abbey, Hertfordshire and of Tempsford Hall, Bedfordshire, (a grandson of John Stuart, 3rd Earl of Bute (1713–1792), KG) and, as a younger son not expecting to inherit the Rashleigh family estates, settled with his first wife in London, seemingly as a gentleman of leisure. Their London address, from the late 1840s onwards, was 3 Cumberland Terrace, Regent's Park, London.

Rashleigh's first wife died in 1852, leaving him a youthful widower with five small children: Caroline Mary Stuart (Rashleigh) Long, Jonathan Rashleigh, Alice Henrietta Rashleigh, Evelyn William Rashleigh and Mary Anna Rashleigh, during much of his middle life. He occupied some of his time during this period by serving as a member of the Metropolitan Board of Works, on which he represented the St. Pancras district, and as a member of the Metropolitan Asylums Board, including being Chairman of Cornwall County Lunatic Asylum Committee for twelve years 1873–1885.

On 3 August 1869, Jonathan Rashleigh married an Irish heiress, Jane Elizabeth Pugh (1836–1902), the only daughter of Arthur Pugh, of Lissadrone, Co. Mayo, by whom he had four further children: Eleanor Elizabeth (Rashleigh) Tremayne, Arthur Rashleigh, Kathleen Rashleigh and Rachel Jane Rashleigh. After his second marriage, Jonathan Rashleigh (1820–1905) together with his second wife and three children from the first marriage: Alice Henrietta Rashleigh, Evelyn William Rashleigh and Mary Anna Rashleigh, had moved in to his marital home – Fortfield House, Sidmouth, Devon. In 1871, he purchased the "Feniton Court Estate not very many miles away in East Devon".

Jonathan Rashleigh (1820–1905) was a JP for Middlesex and Westminster, in 1856, JP and DL for Cornwall, in 1872, High Sheriff of Cornwall in 1877, and Chairman of Cornwall County Lunatic Asylum Committee in 1873–1885. He was a collector of medals, tokens, tickets and classical Greek and Roman coins. Rashleigh was elected a member of the Numismatic Society of London on 23 March 1848 and was to remain associated with it and with its successor body, the Royal Numismatic Society, until his death on 12 April 1905.

The eldest son of J. Rashleigh (1820–1905) – Jonathan Rashleigh (1845–1872) was educated in Harrow and at Christ Church, Oxford (BA), 1869, student of the Inner Temple, 1868. At Harrow he distinguished himself in mathematics.

On 8 November 1870 Jonathan Rashleigh jun. married Mary Frances Labouchere (1848–1874), the youngest daughter of an English banker, John Peter Labouchere of Broome Hall, Surrey (1798–1863), and niece of Henry Labouchere, 1st Baron Taunton.

On 2 July 1872, Mary Frances (Labouchere) Rashleigh gave birth to a son – John Cosmo Stuart Rashleigh (1872–1961) who was to become the heir to his grandfather, as his father, Jonathan Rashleigh jun. (1845–1872) died on 8 December 1872, pre-deceasing his father, Jonathan Rashleigh (1820–1905), of Menabilly.

=== John Rashleigh (1872–1961) ===
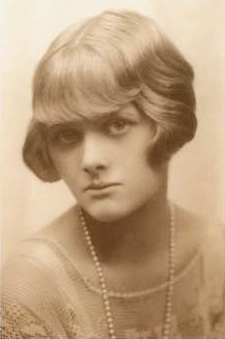
Daphne du Maurier, tenant and restorer of Menabilly 1943–1969.

John Cosmo Stuart Rashleigh (1872–1961), the grandson. He was also lord of the manors in Cornwall of Arallos, Luxulyan, Trenant, Lantyan, Langunett, Manely Durford, Manely Fleming, Lametton, Pohrvan, Pensignance, Tywardreath and Lanyon Polveithan. He was patron of the living of Wickham in Hampshire, a JP for Devon and Cornwall and was High Sheriff of Cornwall in 1908. Educated at Eton, and Trinity College Cambridge, he qualified as a medical doctor in 1904. Although John C. S. Rashleigh resided mainly at Throwleigh near Okehampton in Devon and rarely lived at Menabilly, the house and its grounds had been used for various Liberal party meetings, charity events, rallies, and gatherings of the members of the Women's Institute of which in 1920s Mrs Rashleigh was the President. Eventually, due to staying vacant for most of the time, the house fell into serious decay. In the mid-1920s, Daphne du Maurier, then a teenager, discovered the house while on a holiday with her family in Cornwall. To her surprise John C.S. Rashleigh granted her a lease. She then set about restoring it and made it her home for twenty something years before returning it to the Rashleighs in 1969. On his death in 1961 the settled estate per Will dated 8/9/1960 passed to his cousin's son Philip Stuart Rashleigh (1924–1988) breaking the entail. He moved to Menabilly with his mother, Dorothy Rashleigh (Howell). On his death, without surviving issue, the estate passed in 1993 to Richard Henry Rashleigh.

=== Rashleigh baronets ===
In the 20th century Menabilly passed into the ownership of the Rashleigh baronets, descended from John Rashleigh (1742–1803) of Penquite, Cornwall, the fourth son of Jonathan Rashleigh (1690–1764) of Menabilly. The owner in 2013 was Sir Richard Harry Rashleigh, 6th Baronet (born 1958), who in 1996 married Emma Felicity Clare McGougan (1961–2013), by whom he has two children, formerly a secretarial assistant to prime minister Margaret Thatcher.

== Menabilly in the 21st century ==
Today Menabilly and most of the grounds remain private although three cottages on the estate are rented as holiday lets.

== In popular culture ==
The house was the inspiration, along with Milton Hall, Cambridgeshire, for "Manderley", the house in du Maurier's novel Rebecca (1938). Like Menabilly, the fictional Manderley was hidden in woods and could not be seen from the shore. Du Maurier's novel The King's General is also set here and features the skeleton found in the cellar.

== Sources ==
- Pirie-Gordon, H., ed. (1937). "Rashleigh of Menabilly". Burke's genealogical and heraldic history of the landed gentry (15th (centenary) ed.). London: Shaw Publishing.
- Du Maurier, Daphne (1993). Malet, Oriel (ed.). Letters from Menabilly : Portrait of a Friendship. Weidenfeld & Nicolson. ISBN 9780297813040.
- Dunkin, Edwin Hadlow Wise (1882). Monumental Brasses of Cornwall, with Descriptive, Genealogical and Heraldic Notes. Spottiswoode.
- Cassidy, Irene (1981). "RASHLEIGH, John (1554–1624), of Fowey and Menabilly, Cornw.". In Hasler, P. W. (ed.). The History of Parliament: The House of Commons, 1558–1603 [3 vols]. The Stationery Office. ISBN 978-0118875011.
- Hunneyball, Paul (2010). "Fowey: Borough". In Thrush, Andrew; Ferris, John P. (eds.). The House of Commons 1604–1629 [6 vols]. Cambridge University Press. ISBN 978-1107002258.
- Cruickshanks, Eveline (1970). "RASHLEIGH, Philip (1689–1736), of Menabilly, Cornw.". In Sedgwick, R. (ed.). The History of Parliament: The House of Commons, 1715–1754 [2 vols]. The Stationery Office. ISBN 978-0118800983.
- College of Arms (Great Britain) (1895). Vivian, John Lambrick (ed.). The Visitations of the County of Devon: Comprising the Herald's Visitations of 1531, 1564, & 1620. H. S. Eland.
