= Return of Owners of Land, 1873 =

Survey of land ownership in the United Kingdom

The two-volume Return of Owners of Land, 1873 is a survey of land ownership in the United Kingdom. It was the first complete picture of the distribution of land ownership in Great Britain since the Domesday Book of 1086, thus the 1873 Return is sometimes called the "Modern Domesday", and in Ireland since the Down Survey of 1655–1656. It arose from the desire of the Victorian governing landed classes, many of whom sat in the House of Lords, to counter rising public clamour (encouraged by the press) about what was considered the monopoly of land.

In 1872, the Local Government Board was ordered to compile a list of landowners from ratings records. One return was prepared for England and Wales (excluding London), and separate returns were prepared for Scotland (in 1874) and Ireland (in 1876). The Return lists holdings by size (in acres, roods and poles) and estimated yearly rental of all holdings over one acre. It is laid out by county and landowner, with an identifying address for each landowner. For landowners with extensive, scattered holdings, the address may not correspond to the land's location and may be outside the county in question. The location of the land is not given. A comparison with the Domesday Book survey was made in the Return's Explanatory Statement. The 1873 Return had inaccuracies (some significant), and a revised edition—The Great Landowners of Great Britain and Ireland—was published in 1883 by John Bateman (1839–1910).

== Origins ==
Until 1867 only about one-eighth of the adult male population had the right to vote, but the Second Reform Bill extended the franchise – to about one third. A consequence was that, for the first time in British history, most of the electorate were not landowners. The newly enfranchised class swiftly elected the Liberal government of William Ewart Gladstone, belligerent to landowners and Conservatives. Radical politicians like Richard Cobden, John Bright and John Stuart Mill revived the arguments of the classical economists, such as Adam Smith and David Ricardo, that land value enhancement was unearned wealth that ought to be taxed. Mill wrote:

Land is limited in quantity while the demand for it, in a prosperous country, is constantly increasing. The rent, therefore, progressively rises, not through the exertion or expenditure of the owner, to which we should not object, but by the mere growth of wealth and population. The incomes of landowners are rising while they are sleeping, through the general prosperity produced by the labour and outlay of other people.

University of California economist Peter H. Lindert wrote:

The issue of unequal ownership also heated up in the 1870s. Bright used the 1861 census to charge that there were only 30,000 land-owners, and alleged that "fewer than one hundred and fifty men" owned "half the land in England," a "practical monopoly on land ... ".

He was wrong. The fifteenth Earl of Derby knew it, but had no data to counter Bright:

My belief is – though I give it only as a thing which seems to me probable, not as a thing proved – that both very great and very small properties are becoming fewer, and those of a middle size more numerous.... But why should we be left on this subject to mere speculation? Is it impossible to get at the facts? Is a Domesday Book more difficult now than in the days of the Conqueror?

Thus, allegedly exaggerated or false assertions had been made by critics of the landed classes about the concentration of land ownership by a ruling elite, and reliable, independent data was desired to refute the attacks. The question was put in the House of Lords on 19 February 1872 by Edward Stanley, 15th Earl of Derby (1826–1893) to the Lord Privy Seal Charles Wood, 1st Viscount Halifax, "Whether it was the intention of Her Majesty's Government to take any steps for ascertaining the number of proprietors of land and houses in the United Kingdom, with the quantity of land owned by each proprietor". The government was in agreement with the suggestion, and Lord Derby's question was a pre-arranged formality to begin the process.

== Publication ==
Lord Halifax accepted the case for the production of a Return, it was prepared by the Local Government Board, and was presented to both Houses of Parliament. The Return covers England and Wales, except for London—nearly 15,000 parishes, whose records had about 5,000,000 assessments. Instructions were issued to relevant parish officials in September 1872, and the last return was received over two years later. The first examination of the returns disclosed nearly 250,000 discrepancies, which were resolved by correspondence and other means of inquiry. All statements and information in the Return, except for owner addresses, were derived from rating valuation lists for assessments under the Poor Law and were already held by each parish. Wealthy householders and landowners paid a tax (rates) to maintain the roads, other features and chiefly to support the poor.

=== Sources ===
Unlike the Domesday Book, the 1873 Return was not based on original research by surveyors but compiled existing parish data. The valuation lists of 1873 were prepared under the provisions of the Union Assessment Committee Act of 1862, which was introduced by Poor Law Board president Charles Pelham Villiers. The Poor Law Commissioners issued an order specifying the poor rate shortly before 1836, and the Parochial Assessment Act that contained the first statutory provision prescribing the rate. The 1862 act provided for the appointment of an assessment committee by the guardians of every union for investigating and supervising the valuation of taxable properties in each parish of a union for assessment purposes. The overseers of each parish were required to make out a list of all taxable properties and their annual value in the following format: occupant, owner, property description and name (or location, estimated area, gross estimated rental, and taxable value. Valuation lists existed for every parish in 1873, except for a few parishes under separate boards of guardians to which the Union Assessment Committee Act did not apply. Parish valuation lists were deposited with the clerks of the unions, and application was made to those officers to prepare and furnish particulars for the 1873 Return; similar applications were made to the guardians of parishes not under the Union Assessment Committee Act.

== Format ==
The columns were headed from left to right: "Surname, Christian name, Acres, Rods, Perches, £s. Area is listed as A/R/P. A is acre (640 to the square mile). R is rood: a ploughing strip 220 yards long (one furlong) and 5.5 yards (5.0 m) wide (one rod, pole or perch). Four roods equal one acre. P is a square pole [30.25 square yards (25.29 m^{2})]; 40 square poles equal one rood. Rentals are in £ (pounds) and s (shillings); 20 shillings equal £1. The £s value relates to the land's gross estimated rental. Problems were encountered in defining the headings.

== England and Wales ==
The Return was published in 1875 and sold for 10s 6d (equivalent to £41 in 2018) each in two leather-bound volumes (edited by John Lambert) as England and Wales (Exclusive of the Metropolis): Return of Owners of Land, 1873; Presented to both Houses of Parliament by command of Her Majesty; London, printed by George Edward Eyre and William Spottiswoode. Printers to the Queen's Most Excellent Majesty. For her Majesty's Stationery Office, 1875.

== Scotland ==
The Scottish Return was published in 1874 as "Scotland: Owners of Lands and Heritages 17 & 18 Vict., Cap. 91, 1872–3 Return: I: Of the name and address of every owner of one acre and upwards in extent (outside the municipal boundaries of boroughs containing more than 20,000 inhabitants) with the estimated acreage and the annual value of the land and heritages of individual owners. And of the number of owners of less than one acre with the estimated aggregate acreage and annual value of the lands and heritage of such owners in each county II: A similar return for municipal boroughs containing more than 20,000 inhabitants. Presented to both Houses of Parliament by command of Her Majesty; Edinburgh: Printed by Murray and Gibb, printers to Her Majesty's Stationery Office, 1874".

== Ireland ==
In 1873, the Local Government Board for Ireland began to ascertain the number and names of owners of land of one acre or more. Clerks of the Poor Law unions were ordered to draw up lists of such people from the property valuation and rate books in their custody. The lists were returned to the Local Government Board by the end of 1875, arranged into counties, alphabetised, and published in 1876 in a 200-page edition as Return of Owners of Land of One Acre and Upwards, in the Several Counties, Counties of Cities, and Counties of Towns in Ireland. (Note: See Landowners of Ireland, 1876.)

== Popularity ==
Although the Return was published for a political reason, it became sought-after reading amongst society in general (including the landed classes). John Bateman, in the preface to his 1883 work (see below), summarised the situation:

That the affairs of one's neighbours are of no little interest to men of every class of life has perhaps never been more strongly proved than by the production of and great demand for The Modern Domesday Book. Not only have Mr. Frederick Purdy and others analysed it, Mr. Lyulph Stanley abused it, Mr. John Bright moved its digestion in the House, and the Spectator and other London journals scathingly criticised it, but the immense herd of country newspapers have actually reproduced it, as far as their own neighbourhoods are concerned, in their columns, much, probably, to the satisfaction of the bulk of readers, to whom twenty-six shillings [equivalent to £105 in 2018] (the price of the English volumes alone) is prohibitory. As an example of this, I may mention, that having a small party in my house during one of those dubious weeks which come in 'twixt the close of the hunting and the beginning of the London season, I was saved all Marthean cares as to the amusement of my guests simply by leaving about on the table the two huge volumes of The Modern Domesday, over which I found bowed with the utmost constancy two or more heads. I heard from one of my guests that the copy of the work at the Ultratorium (Note: A fictitious gentlemen's club) was reduced to rags and tatters within a fortnight of its arrival a lesson which was not wasted on the library committee of my own club, who caused the book to be so bound as to defy anything short of a twelve-year-old school-boy.

== Corrected and derivative editions ==
John Bateman (1839–1910) published in 1876 The Acre-ocracy of England, based on the 1873 Return. He published a corrected and edited version of the 1873 Return, which differs significantly from the original, under the Harrison & Sons imprint in 1878. He listed the commonest sources of error in its preface. The fourth (and final) edition of his work (under the full title The Great Landowners of Great Britain and Ireland: A list of all owners of three thousand acres and upwards, worth £3,000 a year; also, one thousand three hundred owners of two thousand acres and upwards, in England, Scotland, Ireland, & Wales, their acreage and income from Land, Culled from "The Modern Domesday Book") was published in 1883, also by Harrison. This was republished in 1971 by Leicester University Press, with the text of the fourth edition and an introduction by David Spring.

== See also ==
- HM Land Registry
