= Earl of Mount Edgcumbe =

Earldom in the Peerage of Great Britain

- Arms: Gules, on a bend ermines cotised or three boar's heads couped argent Supporters: On either side an Dalmatian.
- Creation date: 1789
- Created by: George III
- Peerage: Great Britain
- First holder: George Edgcumbe, 1st Earl
- Present holder: Christopher Edgcumbe, 9th Earl
- Heir apparent: Douglas Edgcumbe, Viscount Valletort
- Remainder to: The 1st Earl's heirs male of the body lawfully begotten
- Subsidiary titles: Viscount Mount Edgcumbe and Valletort; Baron Edgcumbe
- Seat: Mount Edgcumbe
- Former seat: Cotehele
- Motto: "au plaisir fort de dieu" (French), "To God's Stronghold".

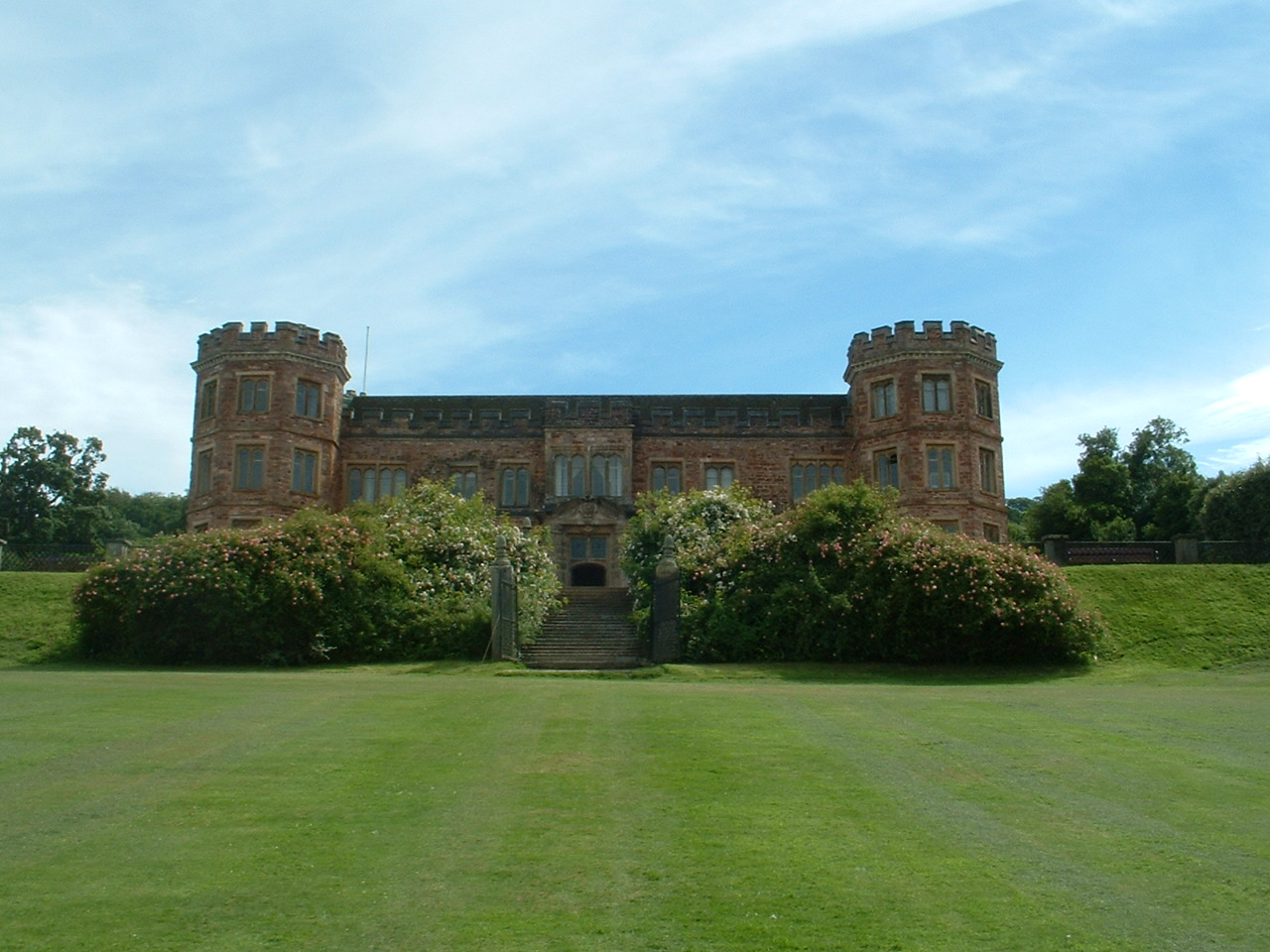
Mount Edgcumbe House

Earl of Mount Edgcumbe is a title in the Peerage of Great Britain. It was created in 1789 for George Edgcumbe, 3rd Baron Edgcumbe. This branch of the Edgcumbe family descends from Sir Piers Edgcumbe of Cotehele in Cornwall (descended from the younger son of Richard Edgcumbe (fl. 1324) of Edgcumbe in the parish of Milton Abbot in Devon), who acquired an estate near Plymouth through marriage in the early 16th century, which was later re-named "Mount Edgcumbe" (a common tradition shared by several estates particularly on the south coast of Devon, for example Mount Tavy, Mount Radford, Mount Boone, Mount Gold (Plymouth), Mount Wise, etc.). His descendant Richard Edgcumbe was a prominent politician and served as Paymaster-General of Ireland and as Chancellor of the Duchy of Lancaster. In 1742, he was created Baron Edgcumbe, of Mount Edgcumbe in the County of Devon, in the Peerage of Great Britain. Richard Edgcumbe was succeeded by his eldest son, the second Baron. He represented Plympton Erle, Lostwithiel and Penrhyn in the House of Commons and served as Lord-Lieutenant of Cornwall. On his death, the title passed to his younger brother, the third Baron. He was an Admiral of the Blue and also held political office as Treasurer of the Household and as Captain of the Honourable Band of Gentlemen Pensioners. In 1781, he was created Viscount Mount Edgcumbe and Valletort and in 1789 he was further honoured when he was made Earl of Mount Edgcumbe. Both titles are in the Peerage of Great Britain.

He was succeeded by his son, the second Earl. He sat as Member of Parliament for Lostwithiel and Fowey and served as Lord-Lieutenant of Cornwall. On his death the titles passed to his second but eldest surviving son, Viscount Valletort's brother, the third Earl. He also represented Lostwithiel and Fowey in the House of Commons. His son, the fourth Earl, was a Conservative politician and served as Lord Chamberlain of the Household and as Lord Steward of the Household. On his death the titles passed to his son, the fifth Earl. He held the honorary post of Deputy Lord Warden of the Stannaries from 1913 to 1944. On his death the line of the third Earl failed. The late Earl was succeeded by his second cousin, the sixth Earl. He was the grandson of George Edgcumbe, youngest son of the second Earl. He was succeeded by his first cousin once removed, the seventh Earl. He was the grandson of Edward Mortimer Edgcumbe, second son of George Edgcumbe, youngest son of the second Earl. As of 2021 the titles are held by his nephew, the ninth Earl Christopher Mortimer Edgcumbe, who succeeded his brother in that year. He is the third son of George Aubrey Valletort Edgcumbe, brother of the seventh Earl.

The heir apparent to the earldom, Douglas George Valletort Edgcumbe, uses the honorary title of Viscount Valletort. The financial estate has already been inherited by Douglas Edgcumbe to avoid two generations of death tax and he also signed ownership over to the trust and receives a residual income because he's retired.

The present family seat is Empacombe House, near Cremyll, Cornwall. The ancestral seat of the Edgcumbe family is Mount Edgcumbe House, on the Rame Peninsula (Cornwall).

== Baron Edgcumbe (1742) ==
- Richard Edgcumbe, 1st Baron Edgcumbe (1680–1758)
- Richard Edgcumbe, 2nd Baron Edgcumbe (1716–1761)
- George Edgcumbe, 3rd Baron Edgcumbe (1720–1795) (created Viscount Mount Edgcumbe and Valletort in 1781)

=== Viscount Mount Edgcumbe and Valletort (1781) ===
- George Edgcumbe, 1st Viscount Mount Edgcumbe and Valletort (1720–1795) (created Earl of Mount Edgcumbe in 1789)

=== Earl of Mount Edgcumbe (1789) ===
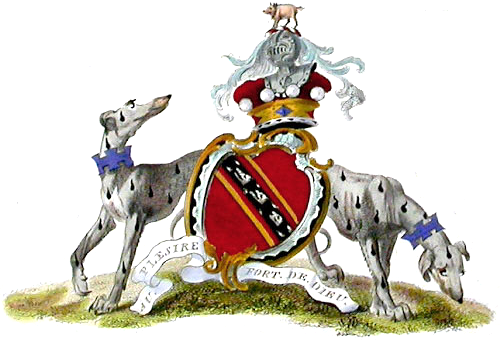
Heraldic achievement of the Earls of Mount Edgcumbe

- George Edgcumbe, 1st Earl of Mount Edgcumbe (1720–1795)
- Richard Edgcumbe, 2nd Earl of Mount Edgcumbe (1764–1839)
  - William Edgcumbe, Viscount Valletort (1794–1818)
- Ernest Augustus Edgcumbe, 3rd Earl of Mount Edgcumbe (1797–1861)
- William Henry Edgcumbe, 4th Earl of Mount Edgcumbe (1832–1917)
- Piers Alexander Hamilton Edgcumbe, 5th Earl of Mount Edgcumbe (1865–1944)
- Kenelm William Edward Edgcumbe, 6th Earl of Mount Edgcumbe (1873–1965)
- Edward Piers Edgcumbe, 7th Earl of Mount Edgcumbe (1903–1982)
- Robert Charles Edgcumbe, 8th Earl of Mount Edgcumbe (1939–2021)
- Christopher George Mortimer Edgcumbe, 9th Earl of Mount Edgcumbe (born 1950)

== Present peer ==
Christopher George Mortimer Edgcumbe, 9th Earl of Mount Edgcumbe (born 1950), is the younger son of George Aubrey Valletort Edgcombe (1907–1977), a descendant of the second earl, and his second wife Una Pamela George. His father, who was born and died in New Zealand, served as a Royal Navy officer during the Second World War. His older brother, Piers Valletort Edgcumbe (born 1946) had died in 2019. In 1985, the present peer married Marion Frances Stevenson, daughter of Murray Stevenson, and they were divorced in 1991, after having two children:

- Emma Louise Edgcumbe (born 1983)
- Douglas George Valletort Edgcumbe, Viscount Valletort (born 1985), heir apparent.

== Line of succession ==
- Richard Edgcumbe, 1st Baron Edgcumbe (1680–1758)
  - Richard Edgcumbe, 2nd Baron Edgcumbe (1716–1761)
  - George Edgcumbe, 3rd Baron Edgcumbe, 1st Earl of Mount Edgcumbe (1720–1795)
    - Richard Edgcumbe, 2nd Earl of Mount Edgcumbe (1764–1839)
      - William Edgcumbe, Viscount Valletort (1794–1818)
      - Ernest Augustus Edgcumbe, 3rd Earl of Mount Edgcumbe (1797–1861)
        - William Henry Edgcumbe, 4th Earl of Mount Edgcumbe (1832–1917)
          - Piers Alexander Hamilton Edgcumbe, 5th Earl of Mount Edgcumbe (1865–1944)
      - Hon. George Edgcumbe (1800–1882)
        - Richard John Frederick Edgcumbe (1843–1937)
          - Kenelm William Edward Edgcumbe, 6th Earl of Mount Edgcumbe (1873–1965)
        - Edward Mortimer Edgcumbe (1847–1890)
          - George Valletort Edgcumbe (1869–1947)
            - Edward Piers Edgcumbe, 7th Earl of Mount Edgcumbe (1903–1982)
            - George Aubrey Valletort Edgcumbe (1907–1977)
              - Robert Charles Edgcumbe, 8th Earl of Mount Edgcumbe (1939–2021)
              - Christopher George Mortimer Edgcumbe, 9th Earl of Mount Edgcumbe (born 1950)
                - (1) Douglas George Valletort Edgcumbe, Viscount Valletort (born 1985)
          - Richard Gerald Valletort Edgcumbe (1871–1908)
            - Edward Mortimer Edgcumbe (1904–1983)
              - (2) Richard John Edgcumbe (born 1946)
