= Jonathan Rashleigh (1693–1764) =

British landowner and Tory politician

Member of Parliament for Fowey
- In office 1727–1764 Serving with Lord FitzWilliam, John Hedges, William Wardour, George Edgcumbe, Robert Boyle-Walsingham
- Preceded by: Lord FitzWilliam; William Bromley
- Succeeded by: Robert Boyle-Walsingham; Philip Rashleigh

Personal details
- Born: 19 January 1693 Menabilly, Cornwall
- Died: 24 November 1764 (aged 71)
- Spouse: Mary Clayton (after 1728)
- Relations: Sir John Carew, 3rd Baronet (grandfather); Philip Rashleigh (brother); William Rashleigh (grandson); Sir John Rashleigh, 1st Baronet (grandson)
- Children: 13, including Philip
- Parent(s): Jonathan Rashleigh; Sarah Carew Rashleigh

Jonathan Rashleigh (19 January 1693 – 24 November 1764) of Menabilly, Cornwall, was a British landowner and Tory politician who sat in the House of Commons for 37 years from 1727 to 1764.

== Early life ==
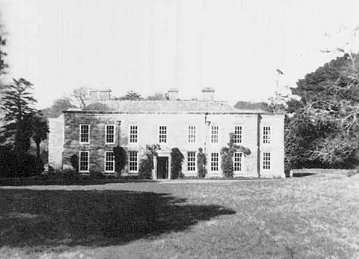
Menabilly

Rashleigh was born on 19 January 1693 at Menabilly, near Fowey in Cornwall. He was the fourth and youngest son of Jonathan Rashleigh (1642–1702), MP by his second wife, Sarah (née Carew) Rashleigh. His sister, Sarah Rashleigh was married to the Rev. Carolus Pole, brother of Sir William Pole.

His maternal grandfather was Sir John Carew, 3rd Baronet, M.P., of Antony, Cornwall.

== Career ==
Rashleigh was appointed Recorder of Fowey in 1714. At the 1727 British general election he was returned unopposed on the family interest as Tory Member of Parliament (MP) for Fowey. He was returned again unopposed at the general elections of 1734, 1741, 1747, 1754 and 1761. He is not recorded as ever speaking and never held an office or pension.

=== Inheritance and estates ===
He was heir to his brother Philip Rashleigh, a supporter of the Jacobite pretender who died in 1736 without issue, and his half first-cousin Sir Coventry Carew, 6th Baronet of Antony, who died 1748, from whom he co-inherited with his great-nephew Reginald Pole Carew, several manors in Cornwall, including East Antony, Manely Durnford, Langunnet, Little Deviock, Sheviock, Nancolleth, Pensignance, Penventon, Helsett, Drewsteignton and Notter.

After the death of Lady Carew in 1762 he inherited further properties, namely Roserrow in St Minver and Davidstow, Tregollen in St Minver and Davidstow, Trelander in St Minver and Davidstow, Grays in St Minver and Davidstow, Rosebenault in St Minver and Davidstow, Newham stream works and St Veep woods.

== Personal life ==
On 11 June 1728, Rashleigh was married to Mary Clayton, daughter of Sir William Clayton, 1st Baronet. He and his wife had nine sons and four daughters, including:

- Philip Rashleigh (1729–1811), who married his first cousin, Jane Pole (1720–1795), only daughter of the Rev. Carolus Pole (third son of Sir John Pole of Shute).
- William Rashleigh (1733–c. 1747), who died unmarried.
- Mary Rashleigh (1737–1806), who married William Stackhouse.
- Rachel Rashleigh (1739–1829), who married John Gould MD.
- Rev. Jonathan Rashleigh (1740–1806), married Catherine Stackhouse, daughter of Rev. William Stackhouse of Trehane, whose descendants continued the Menabilly line.
- John Rashleigh of Penquite (1742–1803), who married Katherine Battie, daughter and co-heir of William Battie, Esq. M.D.

Rashleigh died on 24 November 1764 and the estates passed to his eldest son Philip. Upon Philip's death in 1811, as he had no issue, the family estates passed to Rashleigh's grandson William Rashleigh (the eldest son of his third son), MP for Fowey and Sheriff of Cornwall.

=== Descendants ===
Through his fourth son, John Rashleigh, he was a grandfather of Sir John Colman Rashleigh, 1st Baronet of Prideaux, Cornwall, and great-grandfather of Sir Colman Rashleigh, 2nd Baronet, MP for East Cornwall.

Parliament of Great Britain
Preceded by The Viscount FitzWilliam; William Bromley	Member of Parliament for Fowey; 1727 – 1764; With: The Viscount FitzWilliam to 1734; John Hedges 1734–37; William Wardour 1737–46; Hon. George Edgcumbe 1746–61; Hon. Robert Boyle-Walsingham from 1761	Succeeded by Hon. Robert Boyle-Walsingham; Philip Rashleigh
