= Philip Rashleigh (1729–1811) =

British politician

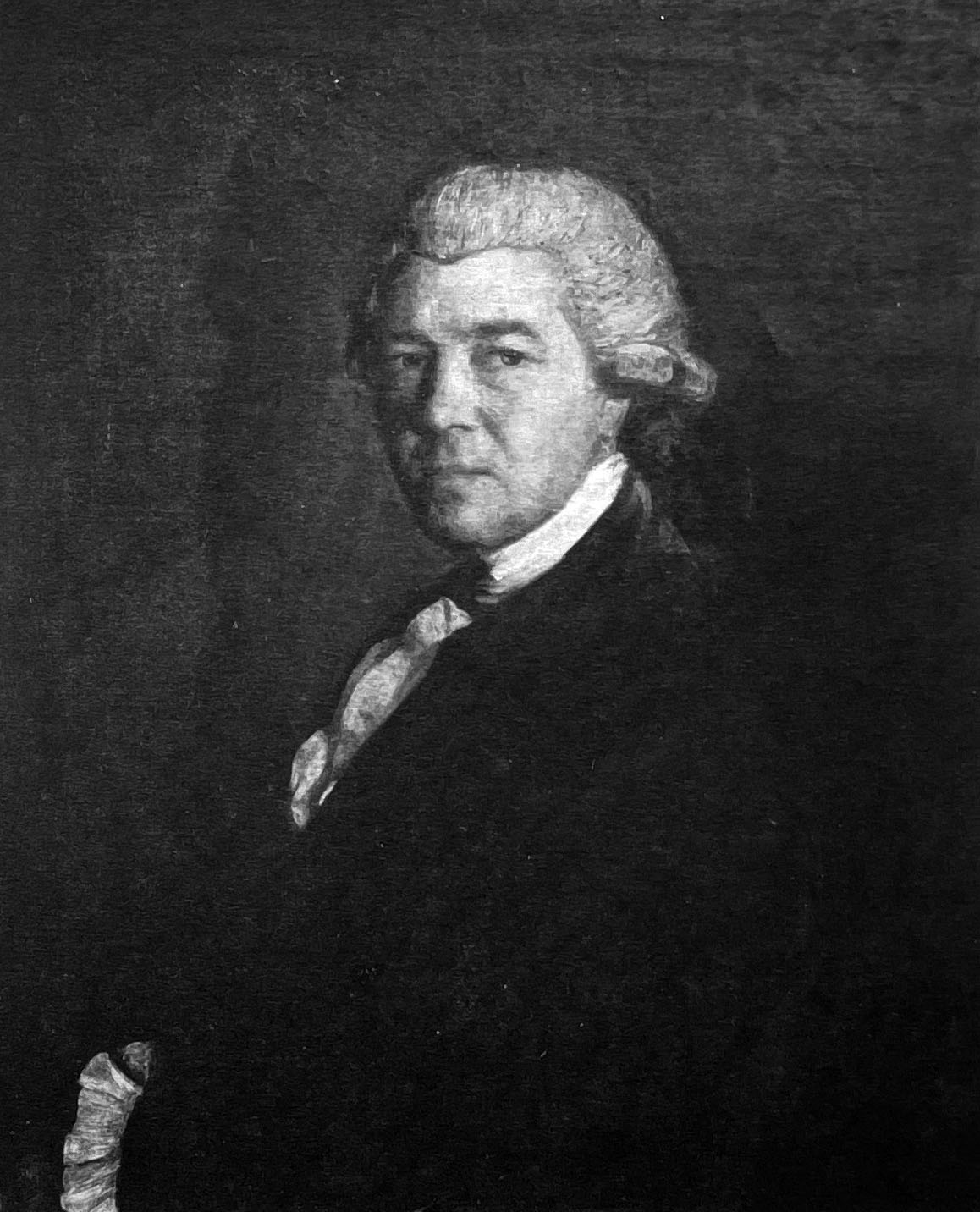
- Portrait by John Opie c1795
- Known for: Rashleigh Gallery at Royal Cornwall Museum.
- Scientific career
- Fields: Mineralogy, Geology

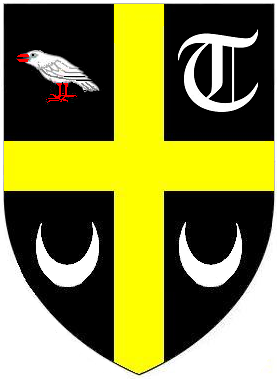
Arms of Rashleigh: Sable, a cross or between in the first quarter: a Cornish chough, argent beaked and legged gules; in the second quarter: a text "T"; in the third and fourth quarters: a crescent all of the third

Philip Rashleigh FRS FSA (28 December 1729 – 26 June 1811) of Menabilly, Cornwall, was an antiquary and Fellow of the Royal Society and a Cornish squire. He collected and published the Trewhiddle Hoard of Anglo-Saxon treasure, which still gives its name to the "Trewhiddle style" of 9th century decoration.

== Origins ==
He was born at Aldermanbury, City of London, on 28 December 1729, the eldest son and heir of Jonathan Rashleigh (1693–1764), of Menabilly, MP for Fowey in Cornwall, by his wife Mary Clayton, daughter of Sir William Clayton, 1st Baronet (died 1744) of Marden Park in Surrey. (see: Woldingham)

== Career ==
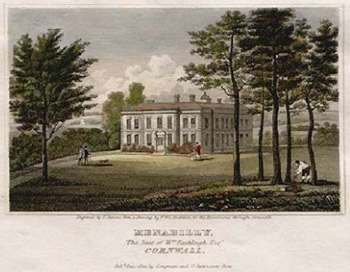
Antique print of Menabilly

He matriculated from New College, Oxford, 15 July 1749, and contributed to the poems of the university on the death of Frederick, Prince of Wales, a set of English verses, which is reprinted in Nichols's Select Collection of Poems (viii. 201–2); he left Oxford without taking a degree. On the death of his father in 1764 he inherited the family seat of Menabilly, near Fowey on the south coast of Cornwall.

He also took over from him in Parliament as the elected member for the family borough of Fowey on 21 January 1765, sitting continuously, in spite of contests and election petitions, until the dissolution of 1802, by which time he was known as the "Father of the House of Commons". His knowledge of Cornish mineralogy procured his election as a Fellow of the Society of Antiquaries and Fellow of the Royal Society in 1788.

== Portrait ==
A portrait of Rashleigh, seated in a chair, was painted by John Opie about 1795, and is now in the Royal Cornwall Museum, Truro. It is a "fine specimen of the painter's best period".

== Scientific work ==
Rashleigh's collection of minerals was remarkable for its various specimens of tin. Much is on display at the Royal Cornwall Museum, with portions at the Natural History Museum, and its most valuable portions are described in two volumes of Specimens of British Minerals from his cabinet (1797 and 1802). In the same collection are models in glass of the hailstones that fell on 20 October 1791, particulars of which, with the figured representations, are given, on Rashleigh's information, in King's Remarks on Stones fallen from the Clouds, pp. 18–20. He contributed antiquarian papers to the Archæologia, ix. 187–8, xi. 83–4, xii. 414, but they were derided by Dr. John Whitaker as the work of an "amateur in antiquarianism". A paper by him on certain "alluvial deposits" at Sandrycock, Cornwall, is in the Transactions of the Royal Geological Society of Cornwall, ii. 281–4, and a letter from him to E. M. Da Costa, on some English shells, is in the British Museum Addit. MS. 28541, f. 196. He constructed a remarkable grotto at Polridmouth, near the family seat. In 1791 and 1792, Rashleigh sold 41 specimens from his collection to the Austrian collector Éléonore de Raab.

Rashleigh was a regular correspondent with John Hawkins, patron of Martin Heinrich Klaproth, and William Gregor, discoverer of Titanium. They bought and sold minerals, patronised leading chemists and introduced european geological theories into the British Isles. Cleevely (2000) called these the "Trio of Cornish Geologists".

== Marriage ==
He married his first cousin, Jane Pole (1720–1795), only daughter of the Rev. Carolus Pole, 3rd son of Sir John Pole of Shute, Devonshire. They had no issue, and the family estates passed to his nephew William Rashleigh (1777–1855), MP for Fowey (1812–18) and Sheriff of Cornwall for 1820.

== Death and burial ==
He died at Menabilly on 26 June 1811 and was buried in the church of Tywardreath, Cornwall.

== See also ==
- William Gregor
- John Hawkins
- Martin Klaproth

Parliament of Great Britain
Preceded by Jonathan Rashleigh; Hon. Robert Boyle-Walsingham	Member of Parliament for Fowey; 1765–1800; With: Hon. Robert Boyle-Walsingham 1765–1768; James Modyford Heywood 1768–1774; The Lord Shuldham 1774–1784; John Grant 1784–1786; Viscount Valletort 1786–1795; Sylvester Douglas 1795–1796; Reginald Pole-Carew 1796–1799; Edward Golding 1799–1800	Succeeded by Parliament of the United Kingdom
Parliament of the United Kingdom
Preceded by Parliament of Great Britain	Member of Parliament for Fowey; 1801–1802; With: Edward Golding	Succeeded by Edward Golding; Reginald Pole-Carew
