= James Mercer =

James Mercer may refer to:

- James Mercer (poet) (1734–1804), Scottish soldier and poet
- James Mercer (judge) (1736–1793), American jurist, Virginia delegate to Continental Congress
- James Mercer (Australian politician) (1842–1925), New South Wales politician
- Jimmie Mercer (1871–1914), American lawman born James Arthur Mercer
- James Mercer (mathematician) (1883–1932), English mathematician
- Bert Mercer (James Cuthbert Mercer, 1886–1944), New Zealand aviator
- James Mercer (diplomat) (1916-1985), former Ghanaian ambassador to Israel and chairman of Ghana Airways
- Jimmy Mercer (born 1935), Scottish footballer, see List of Bury F.C. players (1–24 appearances)
- James Mercer (musician) (born 1970), American guitarist and musician
