= Reginald Pole Carew =

British politician (1753–1835)

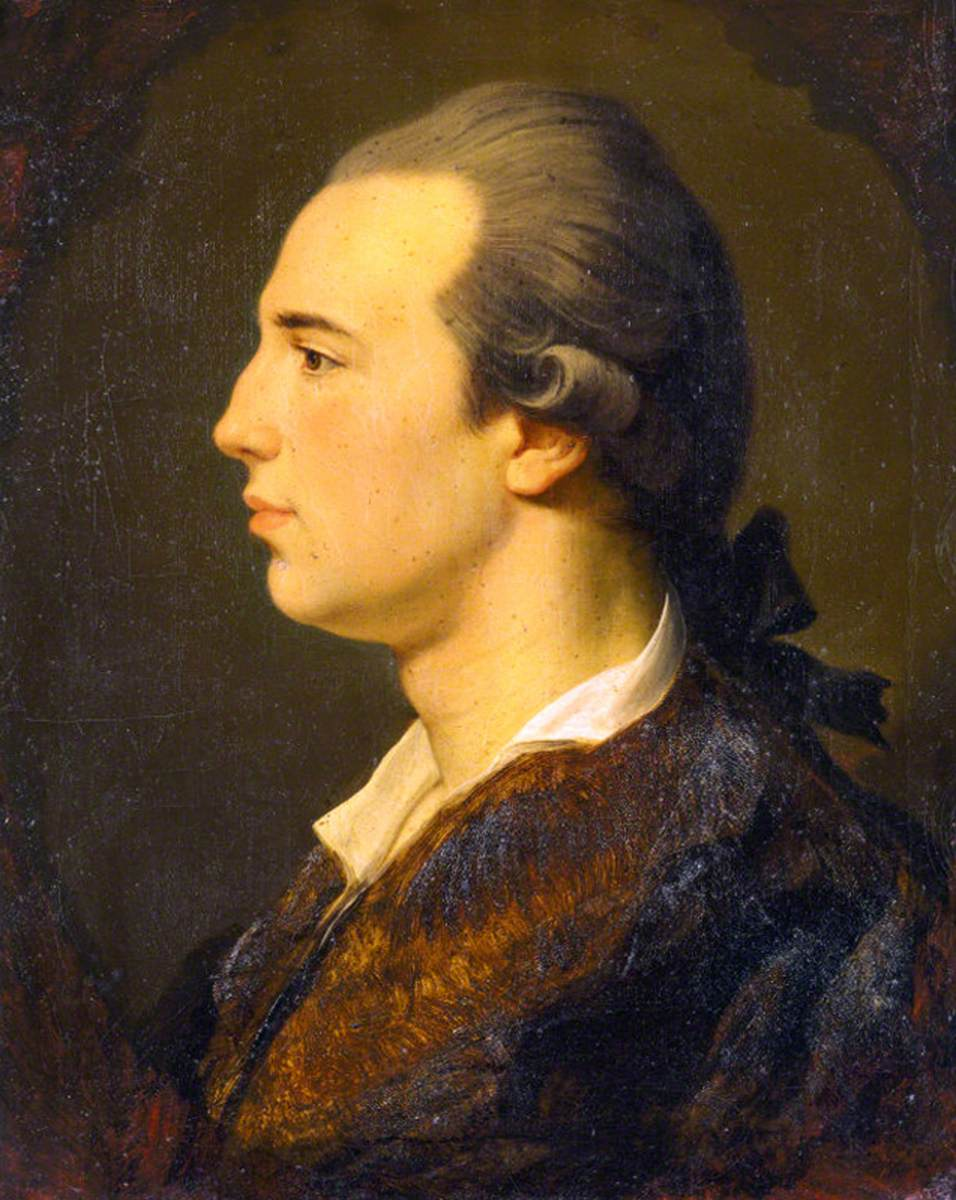
1773 portrait by Melchior Wyrsch

Reginald Pole Carew (28 July 1753 – 3 January 1835) was a British politician.

He was born the son of Reginald Pole and Anne Buller of Stoke Damerel, Plymouth, Devon. He was educated at Winchester College and University College, Oxford and entered the Middle Temple in 1770. He lived at Antony House, Cornwall.

== Career ==
In 1782 Carew became MP for Penryn, in 1787 he became MP for Reigate, and in 1790 he became MP for Lostwithiel. Then in 1796 he became MP for Fowey, giving up the seat in 1799 on taking Crown office as an Auditor of Public Accounts, but resuming his seat in 1802. In August 1803, he became Under-Secretary of State for the Home Department and in January 1805 was made a Privy Counsellor. In 1812 he became MP for Lostwithiel.

He was elected a Fellow of the Royal Society in 1788.

== Art collection ==
Carew was a personal friend of Sir Joshua Reynolds who painted his portrait. He formed a substantial collection of etchings by Rembrandt, which were sold after his death by Benjamin Wheatley in London, 13–15 May 1835. Among the buyers was the British Museum who bought several examples.

== Marriages and issue ==
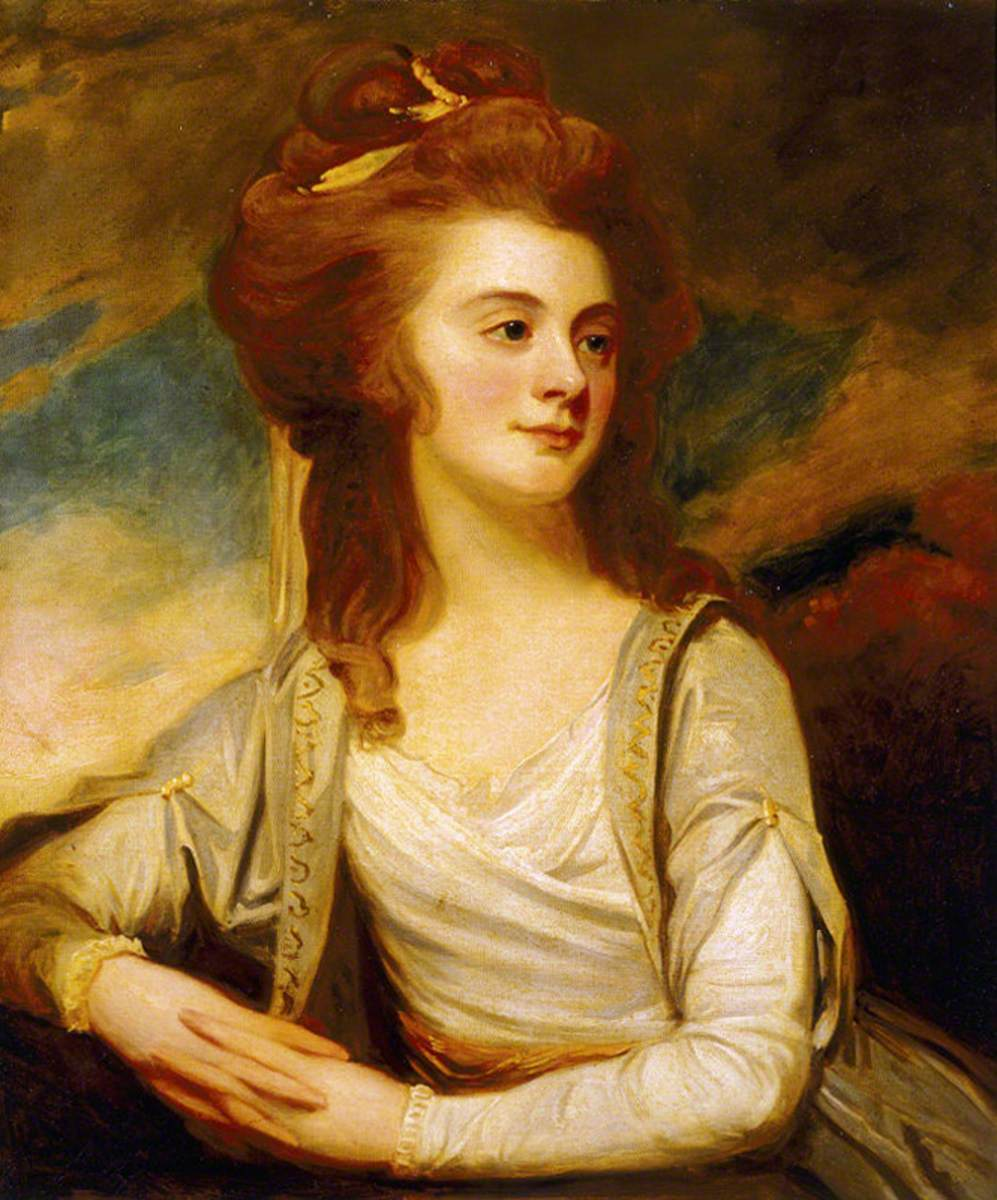
Portrait of Jemima Yorke painted by George Romney

Carew married Jemima Yorke, the daughter of Hon. John Yorke and Elizabeth Lygon, on 18 November 1784. Their children were:

- Harriet Carew (died 4 March 1877), married John Eliot, 1st Earl of St Germans
- Caroline Pole-Carew, married James Bucknall Bucknall Estcourt

He married, secondly, Caroline Anne Lyttelton, daughter of William Henry Lyttelton, 1st Lord Lyttelton, Baron of Frankley and Caroline Bristow, on 4 May 1808. Their children were:

- Frances Antonia Pole-Carew (died 27 February 1889)
- William Henry Pole-Carew (30 July 1811 – 20 January 1888)

He died on 3 January 1835 at age 81.

Parliament of Great Britain
Preceded by Francis Basset; John Rogers	Member of Parliament for Penryn; 1782–1784; With: Francis Basset	Succeeded by Francis Basset; Sir John St Aubyn
Preceded by William Bellingham; Edward Leeds	Member of Parliament for Reigate; 1787–1790; With: William Bellingham 1787–89; Samuel Hood 1789–90	Succeeded by John Cocks; Joseph Sydney Yorke
Preceded by John Sinclair; John Thomas Ellis	Member of Parliament for Lostwithiel; 1790–1796; With: Viscount Valletort 1790–91; George Smith 1791–96	Succeeded by Hans Sloane; William Drummond
Preceded by Philip Rashleigh; Sylvester Douglas	Member of Parliament for Fowey; 1796–1799; With: Philip Rashleigh	Succeeded by Philip Rashleigh; Edward Golding
Parliament of the United Kingdom
Preceded by Philip Rashleigh; Edward Golding	Member of Parliament for Fowey; 1802–1812; With: Edward Golding (July 1802 – December 1802); Robert Wigram snr (1802–1806); Robert Wigram jnr (1806–1812)	Succeeded by William Rashleigh; Robert Wigram jnr
Preceded by George Peter Holford; Ebenezer Maitland	Member of Parliament for Lostwithiel; 1812–1816; With: John Ashley Warre	Succeeded by John Ashley Warre; Viscount Valletort
