= William Edgcumbe =

William Edgcumbe may refer to:

- William Edgcumbe, Viscount Valletort (1794–1818), British politician
- William Edgcumbe, 4th Earl of Mount Edgcumbe (1833–1917; between 1839 and 1861 Viscount Valletort), British courtier and politician
