= James Modyford Heywood =

British politician

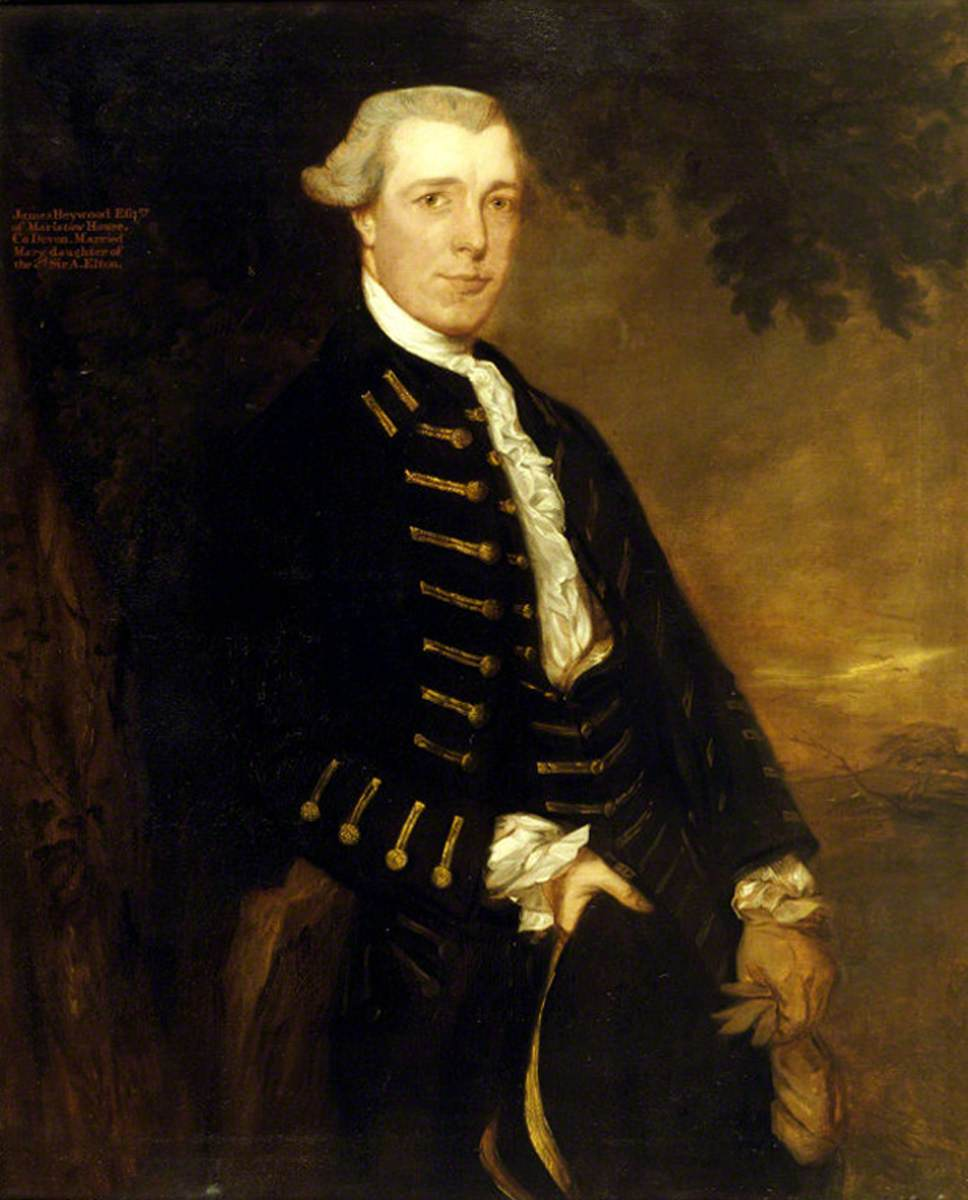
- Portrait by Thomas Gainsborough

Member of Parliament for Fowey
- In office 1768–1774 Serving with Philip Rashleigh
- Preceded by: Philip Rashleigh; Hon. Robert Boyle-Walsingham
- Succeeded by: Philip Rashleigh; The Lord Shuldham

High Sheriff of Devon
- In office 1759–1760
- Preceded by: Peter Comyns
- Succeeded by: Arscott Bickford

Personal details
- Born: c. 1732
- Died: 22 April 1798 (aged 65–66)
- Spouse: Catherine Hartopp
- Relations: Sir Abraham Elton, 2nd Baronet (grandfather)
- Children: 6
- Parent(s): James Heywood; Mary Elton
- Education: Eton College
- Alma mater: Trinity College, Cambridge

James Modyford Heywood (c. 1732 – 22 March 1798) was a British politician who represented Fowey in the House of Commons of Great Britain from 1768 to 1774.

== Early life ==
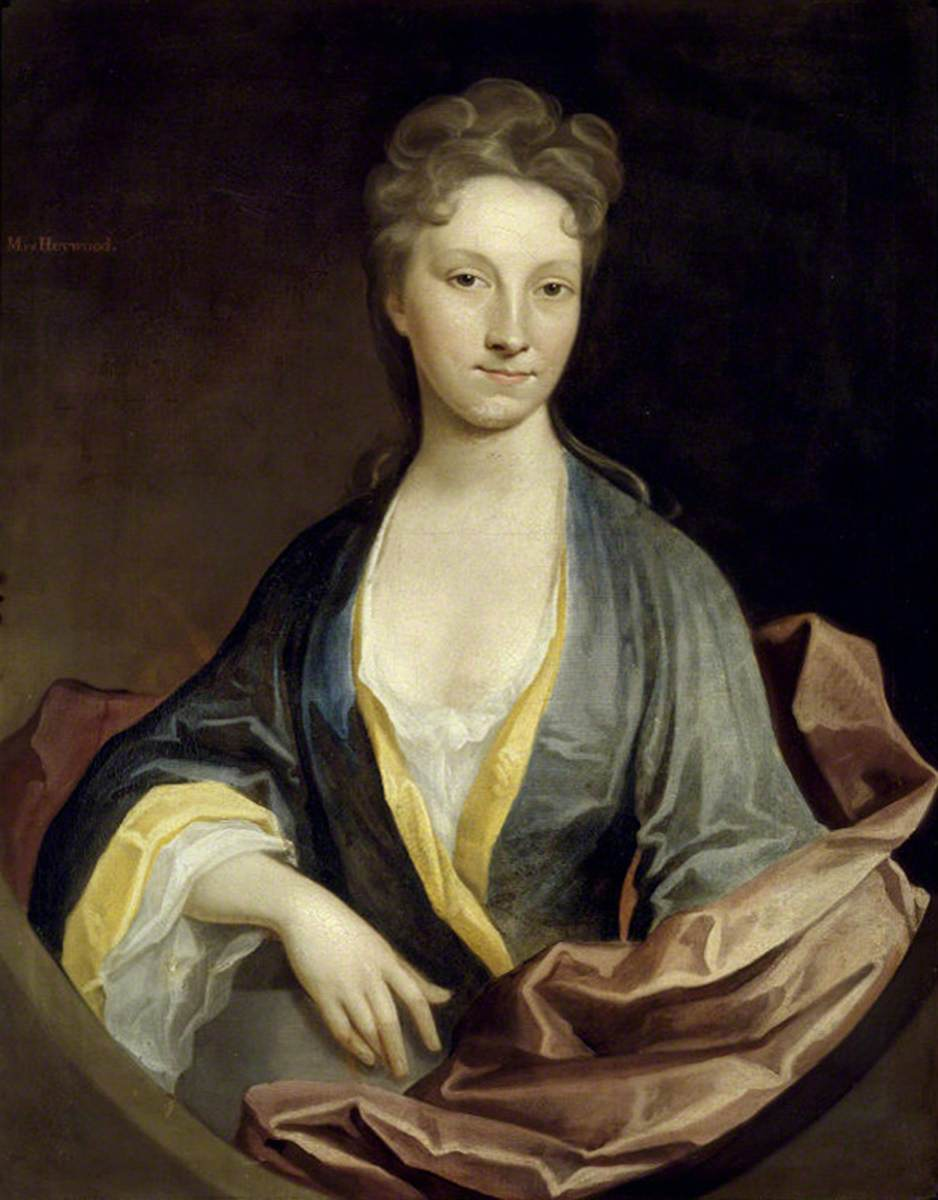
Portrait of his mother, Mrs. James Heywood, by Michael Dahl, c. 1730

Heywood was the only son of James Heywood (c1684–1738), of Maristow (near Roborough in Devon) and Jamaica, and the former Mary Elton (1706–1755), daughter of Sir Abraham Elton, 2nd Baronet of Clevedon Court, MP for Bristol and Taunton. His paternal grandparents were Col. Peter Heywood and Grace (née Modyford) Heywood (daughter of Elizabeth (née Stanning) Modyford and Sir James Modyford, 1st Baronet, Deputy-governor of Jamaica). His sister, Lucy Heywood, married Sir Robert Throckmorton, 4th Baronet.

Heywood succeeded to his father's estates in 1738, including Heywood Hall in St. Mary, Jamaica. He was educated at Eton between 1742 and 1747 and entered Trinity College, Cambridge on 8 June 1747, aged 17.

== Career ==
Heywood served as High Sheriff of Devon in 1759. After a contest, Heywood was returned for Fowey on the Edgcumbe interest in 1768, although no vote by him is recorded before February 1774. In 1770 Thomas Davenport wrote to the Duke of Portland, that "Heywood would have Administration support at the next election." There is no record of his having spoken in the House and he did not stand again for Parliament.

Heywood served as Lord of the Admiralty from December 1783 to March 1784,. under his brother-in-law, Richard Howe, 1st Earl Howe (who became First Lord of the Admiralty in January 1783 during the Earl of Shelburne's ministry, resigning in April 1783 when the Duke of Portland came to power and being re-appointed in December 1783 under the Younger Pitt's first ministry.

Before his death, Heywood sold his Jamaican estate, Heywood Hall (and the enslaved people on it), to Donald Campbell for £18,000.

== Personal life ==
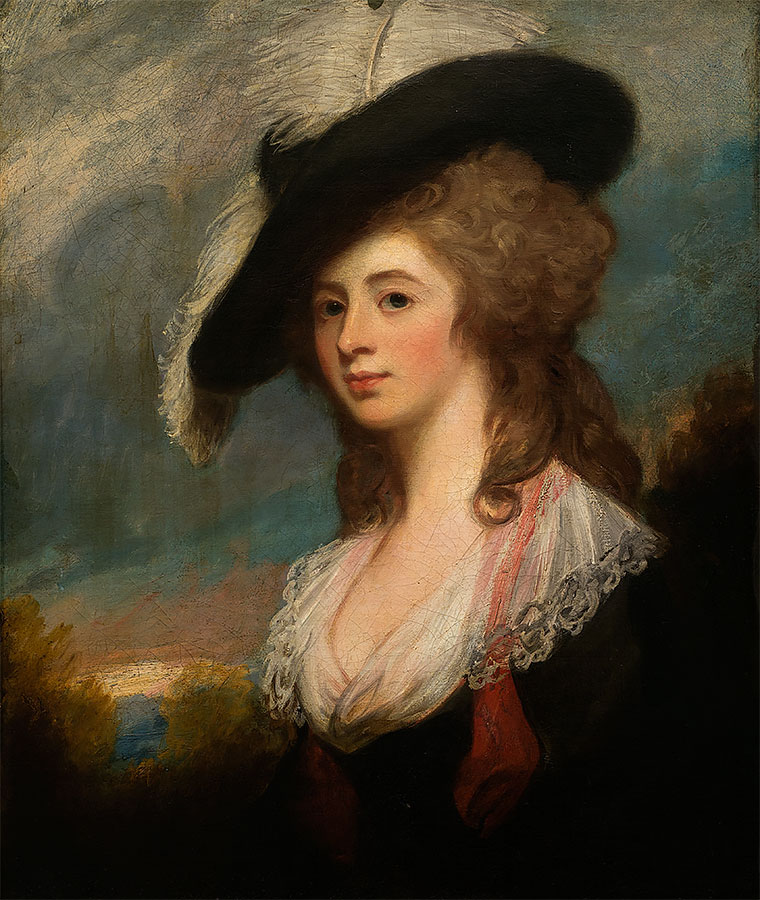
Portrait of his daughter, Mrs. John Musters, by George Romney, 1785

In 1755 Heywood married Catherine Hartopp, daughter and co-heiress of Gen. Chiverton Hartopp of Welby, Nottinghamshire, the Lt. Governor of Plymouth. Her sister, Mary Hartopp, was the wife of Richard Howe, 1st Earl Howe. Together, Catherine and James were the parents of one son and five daughters, including:

- Sophia Heywood (1758–1819), who married John Musters of Colwick Hall, in 1776.
- Emma Heywood (c. 1760–1805), who married Admiral Sir Albemarle Bertie, 1st Baronet, the natural son of Lord Albemarle Bertie, the brother of Peregrine Bertie, 3rd Duke of Ancaster and Kesteven and Brownlow Bertie, 5th Duke of Ancaster and Kesteven, in 1783.
- Maria Henrietta Heywood (c. 1763–1817), who married Lewis Montolieu, a director of Hammersley's Bank who was a son of Lt.-Col. Louis Charles Montolieu, Baron de St. Hypolite, in 1786. Lewis' sister, Anne, was the wife of Sir James Lamb, 1st Baronet.
- Frances "Fanny" Heywood (1765–1834), who married Thomas Orby Hunter, a grandson of Thomas Orby Hunter, MP for Winchelsea, in 1796.

Heywood died on 22 March 1798 and was buried at St Botolph's, Shenleybury, Shenley. After his death, he instructed that his English estates be sold to fund the trusts under his will. Accordingly, Maristow House was sold to Manasseh Masseh Lopes (the son of a rich plantation owner, whose family later gained the title of Baron Roborough), reputedly for £100,000.

Parliament of Great Britain
Preceded by Philip Rashleigh; Hon. Robert Boyle-Walsingham	Member of Parliament for Fowey; 1768–1774; With: Philip Rashleigh	Succeeded by Philip Rashleigh; The Lord Shuldham
