= Robert Boyle-Walsingham =

Royal Navy officer and politician (1736–1780)

Commodore The Honourable Robert Boyle-Walsingham FRS
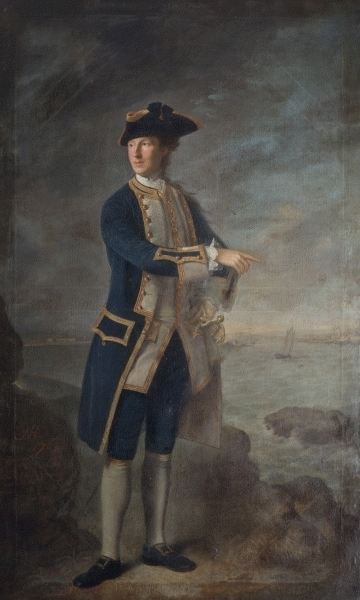

Member of Parliament for Dungarvan
- In office 1758–1768

Member of Parliament for Knaresborough
- In office 1758–1761

Member of Parliament for Fowey
- In office 1761–1768

Member of Parliament for Knaresborough
- In office 1768–1780

Personal details
- Born: March 1736
- Died: 5 October 1780 (aged 44) At sea, off San Domingo

Military service
- Allegiance: Great Britain
- Branch/service: Royal Navy
- Years of service: 1748–1780
- Rank: Captain
- Commands: HMS Crown; HMS Badger; HMS Jason; HMS Boreas; HMS Modeste; HMS Romney; HMS Thunderer
- Battles/wars: Seven Years' War; Battle of Minorca (1756); Siege of Louisbourg (1758); Le Havre raid; Invasion of Martinique (1762); American War of Independence; Battle of Ushant (1778); Affair of Fielding and Bylandt

Captain Robert Boyle-Walsingham FRS (March 1736 – 5 October 1780) was a Royal Navy officer and politician. He was killed in the Great Hurricane of 1780 while serving as a commodore onboard HMS Thunderer.

== Early life and family ==
Robert Boyle was born in March 1736, the son of Henry Boyle, 1st Earl of Shannon, by his wife Henrietta, daughter of Charles Boyle, 2nd Earl of Burlington. His great-grandfather Roger Boyle, 1st Earl of Orrery had married Lady Margaret, daughter of Theophilus Howard, 2nd Earl of Suffolk; another daughter Lady Anne married Thomas Walsingham. Robert Boyle eventually succeeded to the estate of the Walsinghams' daughter Elizabeth, Lady Osborne (died 1733), and adopted the name Walsingham.

On 17 July 1759 Boyle-Walsingham married Charlotte Hanbury Williams, the daughter of Sir Charles Hanbury Williams. Together the couple had two children; Richard (1762–1831) and Charlotte (1769–1831), who in 1806 successfully claimed the Barony of de Ros.

== Military career ==
Boyle joined the Royal Navy on 22 January 1748, initially serving as an ordinary seaman on the 12-gun yacht HMS Dublin. On 3 June 1749 he transferred as an able seaman to the 44-gun frigate HMS Assurance, in which he was promoted to midshipman on 24 June 1751. Boyle continued in Assurance until the ship was wrecked on 24 April 1753. He then joined the 74-gun ship of the line HMS Cumberland on 24 September of the same year, before moving to the 60-gun fourth rate HMS Anson on 21 April 1754. He passed his examination for promotion to the rank of lieutenant on 16 November, having left Anson ten days earlier.

The next year was spent in unemployment, before Boyle was promoted to lieutenant on 23 March 1756, appointed to serve as the fourth lieutenant of the 64-gun ship of the line HMS Revenge. He fought in Revenge at the Battle of Minorca on 20 May, before being promoted to commander on 16 February the following year. His first command was the 18-gun storeship HMS Crown, from which he was translated into the 10-gun sloop HMS Badger on 8 March. Boyle was promoted to captain on 15 June, being given command of the 44-gun frigate HMS Jason.

Again quickly moving ships, Boyle joined the 28-gun frigate HMS Boreas on 3 August. In the following year Boreas fought at the Siege of Louisbourg between 6 June and 27 July, and Boyle saw further action in the ship at the Raid on Le Havre on 3 July 1759. He continued in command of Boreas until 18 February 1760 and joined his next ship, the 64-gun ship of the line HMS Modeste, on 20 February 1761. Between 7 January and 10 February of the following year Boyle fought at the Invasion of Martinique, subsequently leaving Modeste on 27 April. Boyle remained without a command only until 2 July when he joined the 50-gun fourth rate HMS Romney, which he commanded until 7 February 1763 when the ship was paid off.

=== Death ===
A long period of half pay followed until Boyle was given command of the 74-gun ship of the line HMS Thunderer on 23 February 1778. He fought onboard her at the Battle of Ushant on 27 July the same year, and was present at the affair of Fielding and Bylandt on 31 December 1779. Continuing on in Thunderer, Boyle was appointed to serve as a commodore on 15 February 1780. Sent to serve in the West Indies, Boyle was killed when Thunderer was wrecked off San Domingo in the Great Hurricane of 1780 on 5 October.

== Political career ==
Besides his naval career, Boyle sat in the Irish House of Commons for Dungarvan between 1758 and 1768, and in the British House of Commons for Knaresborough between 1758 and 1761, Fowey from 1761 to 1768, and then Knaresborough again from 1768 to his death.

In 1760 Boyle's portrait was painted by Nathaniel Hone the Elder. In 1770 he became first Provincial Grand Master for Kent of the Premier Grand Lodge of England, and he was elected a Fellow of the Royal Society on 5 March 1778.

== Citations ==
Parliament of Ireland
Preceded by Richard Boyle; Robert Roberts	Member of Parliament for Dungarvan; 1758–1768; With: Richard Boyle to 1761; Thomas Carew from 1761	Succeeded by Sir William Osborne; Robert Carew
Parliament of Great Britain
Preceded by Sir Henry Slingsby; Richard Arundell	Member of Parliament for Knaresborough; 1758–1761; With: Sir Henry Slingsby	Succeeded by Sir Henry Slingsby; Lord John Cavendish
Preceded by George Edgcumbe; Jonathan Rashleigh	Member of Parliament for Fowey; 1761–1768; With: Jonathan Rashleigh to 1764; Philip Rashleigh from 1765	Succeeded by Philip Rashleigh; James Modyford Heywood
Preceded by Lord John Cavendish; Sir Anthony Abdy	Member of Parliament for Knaresborough; 1768–1780; With: Sir Anthony Abdy to 1775; Lord George Cavendish to 1780; Viscount Duncannon from 1780	Succeeded by James Hare; Viscount Duncannon
