= Sylvester Douglas, 1st Baron Glenbervie =

British politician (1743–1823)

The Right Honourable The Lord Glenbervie PC KC FRS FRSE FSA
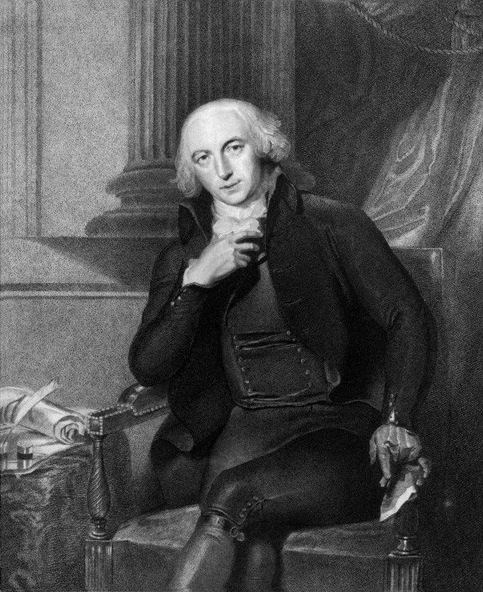

Chief Secretary for Ireland
- In office 1793–1794
- Monarch: George III
- Prime Minister: William Pitt the Younger
- Preceded by: Lord Hobart
- Succeeded by: Viscount Milton

Personal details
- Born: 24 May 1743
- Died: 2 May 1823 (aged 79)
- Spouse: Lady Catherine North (m. 1789; died 1817)
- Education: University of Aberdeen; University of Leyden

Sylvester Douglas, 1st Baron Glenbervie, PC, KC, FRS, FRSE, FSA (24 May 1743 – 2 May 1823) was a British lawyer and politician. He was Chief Secretary for Ireland between 1793 and 1794.

== Background, education and legal career ==
He was the son of John Douglas, descended from James Douglas, minister of Glenbervie in Aberdeenshire, son of Sir Archibald Douglas and half-brother of William Douglas, 9th Earl of Angus. His mother was Margaret Gordon, daughter and co-heir of James Gordon, of Fechel. His sister Katherine married James Mercer, army officer and poet.

Douglas was educated at the University of Aberdeen, graduating MA in 1765 and then studied both Law and Medicine at the University of Leyden. He was admitted to Lincoln's Inn in London in 1771, was called to the Bar in 1776 and became King's Counsel in 1793.

== Political career ==
The same year he was appointed a King's Counsel Douglas gave up his legal career on his appointment as Chief Secretary for Ireland under William Pitt the Younger. In 1794 he was admitted to both the Irish and English Privy Council and returned to the Irish House of Commons for St Canice, a seat he held until 1796. In 1795 he was elected to the British House of Commons for Fowey. He later represented Midhurst between 1796 and 1800, Plympton Erle between 1801 and 1802 and Hastings between 1802 and 1806.

He was asked to accompany Earl Macartney to the Cape of Good Hope in 1796 and, after 18 months there, to succeed him as governor. His wife did not like the idea and he declined the offer, even though an Irish peerage had also been offered. In 1797 Douglas was made a Lord of the Treasury by Pitt, In 1800 Douglas was asked for a second time to go to the Cape as governor. He finally agreed in October 1800, again for an Irish peerage and was so appointed Governor of the Cape of Good Hope, Douglas changed his mind again and accepted a post as Joint Paymaster of HM Forces, subsequently receiving £2731. 10s. in salary, paid from the Cape Treasury, even though he never went there. At the end of the year on 29 November 1800 he was created Baron Glenbervie, of Kincardine, in Scotland.

After serving as joint Paymaster of the Forces between 1801 and 1803 and Vice-President of the Board of Trade between 1801 and 1804, he was Surveyor General of Woods, Forests, Parks, and Chases between 1803 and 1806 and 1807 and 1810. On the office of the Surveyor General of the Land Revenues of the Crown being combined with the former in 1810, became the First Commissioner of Woods and Forests, the head of the new department. He held the office until 1814.

== Personal life ==
In 1789 Lord Glenbervie married Lady Catherine Anne, eldest daughter of Frederick North, Lord North. Their only son Frederick Douglas sat as Member of Parliament for Banbury between 1812 and his early death in 1819. Lady Glenbervie died in February 1817, aged 56. Glenbervie survived her by six years and died in May 1823, aged 79. As he had no surviving male issue the barony became extinct on his death. His library was sold by R. H. Evans in London in two parts, on 13 June 1823 (and seven following days) and 5 July 1823 (and six following days; copies of the catalogue are at Cambridge University Library (shelfmark Munby.c.126(11) and Munby.c.126(13)).

In 1795 he was elected a Fellow of the Royal Society of London and in 1806 elected a Fellow of the Royal Society of Edinburgh, when his proposers were Allan Maconochie, Lord Meadowbank, Gilbert Innes and John Playfair.

Parliament of Ireland
Preceded by John Monck Mason; Marcus Beresford	Member of Parliament for St Canice; 1794–1796; With: John Monck Mason	Succeeded by John Monck Mason; William Elliot
Parliament of Great Britain
Preceded by Philip Rashleigh; Richard Edgcumbe	Member of Parliament for Fowey; 1795 – 1796; With: Philip Rashleigh	Succeeded by Philip Rashleigh; Reginald Pole-Carew
Preceded by Percy Charles Wyndham; Peter Thellusson	Member of Parliament for Midhurst; 1796–1800; With: Charles Long	Succeeded by Charles Long; George Smith
Parliament of the United Kingdom
Preceded by William Adams; Richard Hankey	Member of Parliament for Plympton Erle; July 1801 – 1802; With: Richard Hankey	Succeeded by Richard Hankey; Philip Metcalfe
Preceded by Nicholas Vansittart; William Sturges	Member of Parliament for Hastings; 1802–1806; With: George Gunning	Succeeded by Sir John Nicholl; Sir William Fowle Middleton, Bt
Political offices
Preceded by Lord Hobart	Chief Secretary for Ireland; 1793–1794	Succeeded by Viscount Milton
Preceded by Thomas Steele; George Canning	Paymaster of the Forces; 1801–1803; With: Thomas Steele	Succeeded by John Hiley Addington; Thomas Steele
Preceded by Dudley Ryder	Vice-President of the Board of Trade; 1801–1804	Succeeded by Nathaniel Bond
Preceded by John Robinson	Surveyor General of Woods, Forests, Parks, and Chases; 1803–1806	Succeeded by Lord Robert Spencer
Preceded by Lord Robert Spencer	Surveyor General of Woods, Forests, Parks, and Chases; 1807–1810	Office abolished
New office	First Commissioner of Woods and Forests; 1810–1814	Succeeded by William Huskisson
Academic offices
Unknown	Rector of King's College, Aberdeen; 1805–1814	Unknown
Peerage of Ireland
New creation	Baron Glenbervie; 1800–1823	Extinct
