= Robert Edgcumbe, 8th Earl of Mount Edgcumbe =

New Zealand-British peer (1939–2021)

The Right Honourable The Earl of Mount Edgcumbe
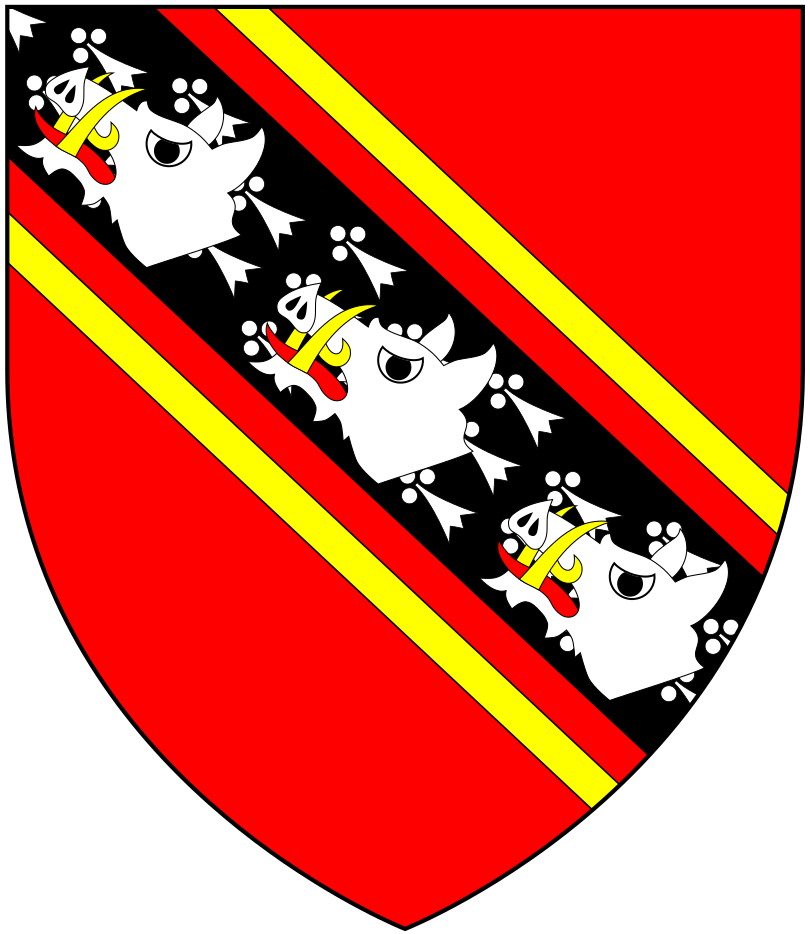

Member of the House of Lords
- Lord Temporal
- In office 9 December 1982 – 11 November 1999 as a hereditary peer
- Preceded by: The 7th Earl of Edgcumbe
- Succeeded by: Seat abolished (Note: Pursuant to the House of Lords Act 1999.)

Personal details
- Born: Robert Charles Edgcumbe; 1 June 1939
- Died: 12 June 2021 (aged 82)
- Party: Crossbench
- Spouse: Joan Ivy Wall (m. 1960; div. 1988)
- Children: 5
- Parent(s): George Edgcumbe; Meta Lhoyer
- Occupation: Estate manager
- Other titles: 8th Viscount Mount Edgcumbe and Valletort; 10th Baron Edgcumbe

Robert Charles Edgcumbe, 8th Earl of Mount Edgcumbe (1 June 1939 – 12 June 2021), was a New Zealand-British peer.

Edgcumbe was the son of Meta Lhoyer and George Aubrey Valletort Edgcumbe. He was educated at Nelson College from 1951 to 1955. He married Joan Ivy Wall, daughter of Ernest Wall, in 1960 and together they had five daughters. They divorced in 1988. The Earl then lived with Beryl Cottrell from Millbrook, who he later married in 2017. He succeeded to his titles in 1982. He was an estate manager in New Zealand. Members of the Edgcumbe family have lived in New Zealand since the 1860s.

The earl and his immediate predecessor both moved to Cornwall on succeeding to the title. The earl's family live in both New Zealand and Cornwall, where he lived in Empacombe House, Cornwall.

Upon his death in 2021, the earl was succeeded by his half-brother, Christopher George Mortimer Edgcumbe.

== Estate ==
The former home of the Edgcumbe family was Mount Edgcumbe House, Cornwall, overlooking Plymouth Sound. An earlier family seat was Cotehele, also in Cornwall. The family has owned the estate since 1354 when William de Eggecomb married Hillaria, daughter and heiress of William de Cotehele. In 1872 the Earl of Edgcumbe was the sixth largest landowner in Cornwall with 13,288 acres (5,377 ha).

Mount Edgcumbe House was severely damaged by incendiary bombs in 1941. It was rebuilt for the sixth earl, and was lived in by the Earls of Mount Edgcumbe until 1987.

== See also ==
- Great Cornish Families

== Notes ==
Peerage of Great Britain
Preceded by Edward Edgcumbe	Earl of Mount Edgcumbe; 1982–2021; Member of the House of Lords (1982–1999)	Succeeded by Christopher Edgcumbe
Preceded by Edward Edgcumbe	Viscount Mount Edgcumbe and Valletort; 1982–2021	Succeeded by Christopher Edgcumbe
Preceded by Edward Edgcumbe	Baron Edgcumbe; 1982–2021	Succeeded by Christopher Edgcumbe
