= William Rashleigh (MP for Fowey) =

British politician (1777–1855)

William Rashleigh (11 January 1777 – 14 May 1855) was an English politician and landowner from Cornwall.

== Biography ==
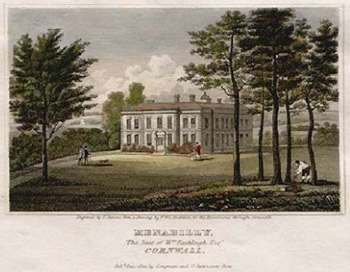
Antique print of Menabilly

Rashleigh was the son of Reverend Jonathan Rashleigh of Silverton, Devon, who was the third son of Jonathan Rashleigh (MP for Fowey) and the brother of Philip Rashleigh of Menabilly.

He was Mayor of Lostwithiel in 1802 and 1808, and in 1811 inherited the vast Menabilly estate from his uncle Philip. This gave him control of the Rashleigh family's pocket borough of Fowey, and at the 1812 general election he returned himself as Member of Parliament (MP) for Fowey. He sold the control of the borough in 1817, and at the 1818 general election retired from the House of Commons.

He was Sheriff of Cornwall for 1820–21.

He was interested in natural history, was a Fellow of the Linnean Society and was elected a Fellow of the Royal Society in 1814.

He died in 1855 at Kilmarth, near Menabilly. He had married twice: firstly Rachel, the daughter of William Stackhouse of Trehane, with whom he had two daughters; and secondly Caroline, the daughter of Henry Hinxman of Ivychurch, Wiltshire with whom he had two sons and four daughters. Menabilly descended to his son William Rashleigh.

Parliament of the United Kingdom
Preceded by Robert Wigram (junior); Reginald Pole Carew	Member of Parliament for Fowey; 1812 – 1818; With: Robert Wigram (junior)	Succeeded by Hon. James Hamilton Stanhope; George Lucy
