= Emma Cust, Countess Brownlow =

English countess (1791–1872)

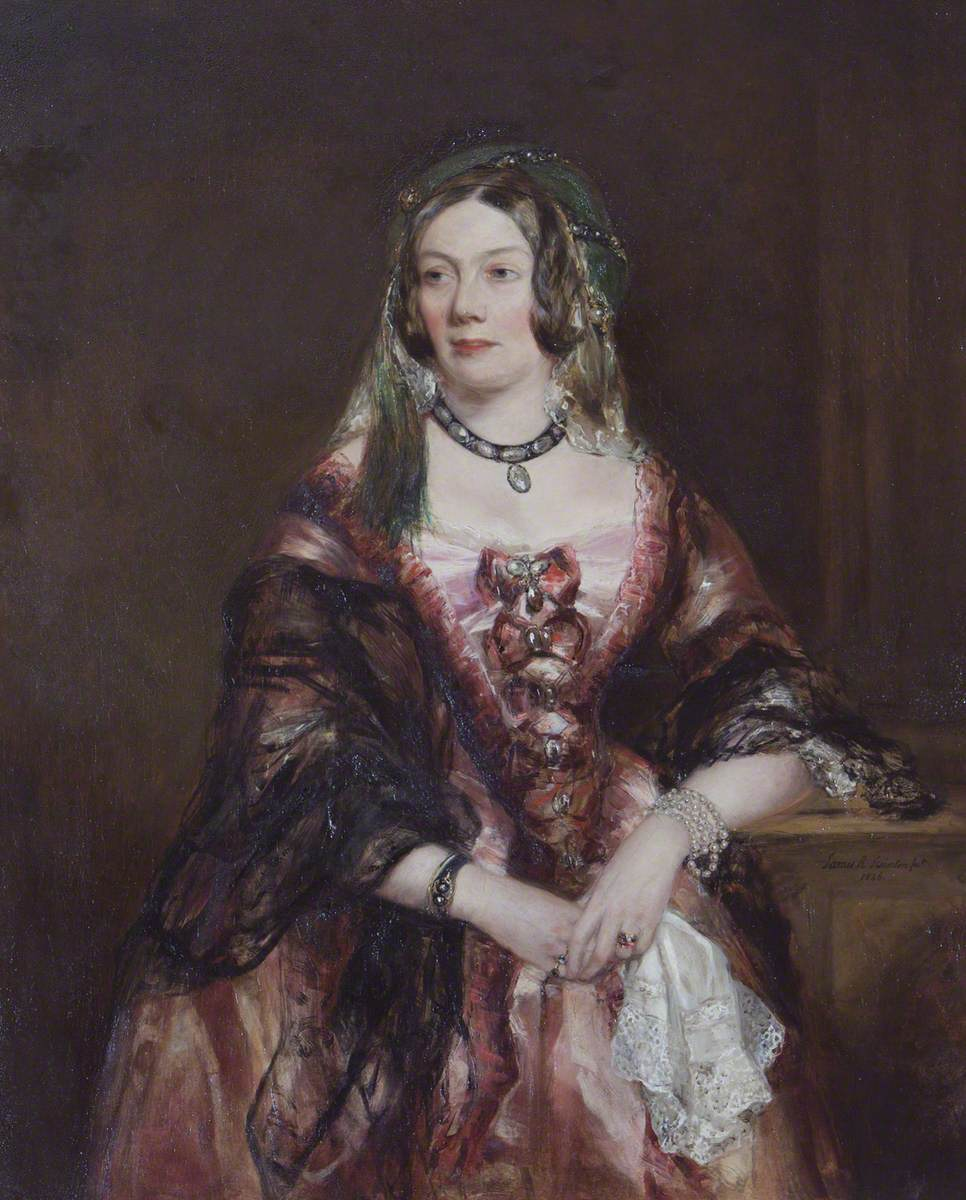
- 1846 portrait by James Rannie Swinton
- Born: 28 July 1791; Hyde Park, London, England
- Died: 28 January 1872 (aged 80); Torquay, Devon
- Spouse: John Cust (m. 1828; died 1853)
- Father: Richard Edgcumbe
- Relatives: George Edgcumbe (grandfather); William Edgcumbe (brother); Ernest Edgcumbe (brother); George Edgcumbe (brother)

Emma Cust, Countess Brownlow, (28 July 1791 – 28 January 1872), formerly Lady Emma Sophia Edgcumbe, was the third wife of John Cust, 1st Earl Brownlow. The couple had no children, although the earl had children from his two previous marriages.

== Biography ==
Emma was born in Portugal Street (now Piccadilly), Hyde Park, London, the daughter of Richard Edgcumbe, 2nd Earl of Mount Edgcumbe, and his wife, the former Lady Sophia Hobart.

She married the earl on 17 July 1828 at St George's, Hanover Square, London. In 1830 she was appointed a Lady of the Bedchamber to Adelaide of Saxe-Meiningen, queen consort of King William IV of the United Kingdom, a position she retained until Adelaide's death in 1849. Her portrait was painted by James Rannie Swinton during the 1840s. Following her husband's death in 1853, she was known as the Dowager Countess Brownlow. The earl's son having predeceased him, the title passed to his grandson, John William Spencer Brownlow Egerton-Cust, who died in 1867, and thereafter to John's younger brother, Adelbert Brownlow-Cust, 3rd Earl Brownlow.

She died at her home, Belton Lodge, in Torquay, aged 80.

== Works ==
- Slight Reminiscences of a Septuagenarian from 1802 to 1815 (John Murray, 1868).

== Arms ==
Coat of arms of Emma Cust, Countess Brownlow
Coronet of an Earl Escutcheon John Cust, 1st Earl Brownlow (Ermine on a chevron Sable three fountains) impaling Richard Edgcumbe, 2nd Earl of Mount Edgcumbe (Gules on a bend Ermines cottised Or three boars’ heads Argent). Supporters Two lions regardant Argent collared paly wavy of six Argent and Azure.
