= Ernest Edgcumbe, 3rd Earl of Mount Edgcumbe =

British peer and politician (1797–1861)

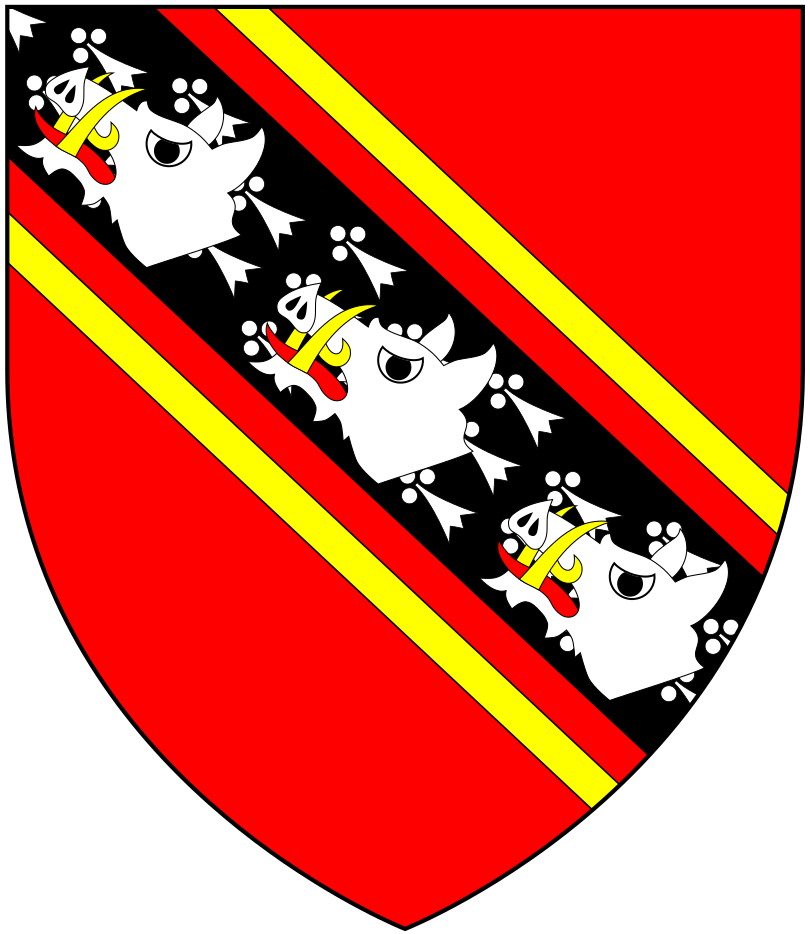
- Arms of Edgcumbe, Earls of Mount Edgcumbe: Gules, on a bend ermines cotised or three boar's heads couped argent

Member of Parliament for Plympton Erle
- In office 1830

Member of Parliament for Lostwithiel
- In office 1826–1830

Member of Parliament for Fowey
- In office 1819–1826

Personal details
- Born: 23 March 1797
- Died: 3 September 1861 (aged 64)
- Spouse: Caroline Feilding (m. 1831)
- Children: William Edgcumbe
- Parent: Richard Edgcumbe (father)
- Relatives: George Edgcumbe (grandfather); William Edgcumbe (brother); Emma Cust (sister); George Edgcumbe (brother)

Ernest Augustus Edgcumbe, 3rd Earl of Mount Edgcumbe (23 March 1797 – 3 September 1861), styled Viscount Valletort between 1818 and 1837, was a British peer and politician. In 1848 he witnessed the Sicilian revolution in Palermo where he had arrived on 10 November with his family including his niece Annie MacDonald. He wrote an eyewitness account of the revolution which was published in The Times. He served as a mediator between the Neapolitan and pro-independence forces.

== Background ==
Mount Edgcumbe was the second but eldest surviving son of Richard Edgcumbe, 2nd Earl of Mount Edgcumbe, and Lady Sophia, daughter of John Hobart, 2nd Earl of Buckinghamshire. He gained the courtesy title Viscount Valletort on the death of his elder brother, William Edgcumbe, Viscount Valletort, in 1818.

== Political career ==
Mount Edgcumbe was returned to Parliament for Fowey in 1819 (succeeding his deceased elder brother Lord Valletort), a seat he held until 1826, and then represented Lostwithiel until 1830. In 1837 he succeeded his father in the earldom and entered the House of Lords.

== Family ==
Lord Mount Edgcumbe married Caroline Augusta, daughter of Rear-Admiral Charles Feilding, in 1831. She was a half-sister of Henry Fox Talbot. He died in September 1861, aged 64, and was succeeded in the earldom by his son, William. Lady Mount Edgcumbe survived him by 20 years and died in November 1881.

Parliament of the United Kingdom
Preceded by Alexander Glynn Campbell; Vacant	Member of Parliament for Fowey; 1819–1826; With: Alexander Glynn Campbell 1819–1820; George Lucy 1820–1826	Succeeded by George Lucy; Robert Eden
Preceded by Sir Robert Wigram; Sir Alexander Grant, Bt	Member of Parliament for Lostwithiel; 1826–1830; With: Sir Alexander Grant, Bt 1826; Sir Edward Cust, Bt 1826–1830	Succeeded by Sir Edward Cust, Bt; William Vesey-FitzGerald
Preceded by Gibbs Crawfurd Antrobus; Sir Charles Wetherell	Member of Parliament for Plympton Erle; 1830; With: Gibbs Crawfurd Antrobus	Succeeded by Gibbs Crawfurd Antrobus; Sir Compton Domvile
Peerage of Great Britain
Preceded by Richard Edgcumbe	Earl of Mount Edgcumbe; 1839–1861	Succeeded by William Henry Edgcumbe
