= William Wardour =

British politician

William Wardour (12 July 1686 – 1746), of Whitney Court, Herefordshire, was a British politician who sat in the House of Commons between 1727 and 1746.

Wardour was the eldest son. of William Wardour of Whitney Court, clerk of the pells, and his wife Anne Sophia Rodd daughter of Robert Rodd of Foxley, Herefordshire. He succeeded his father in 1699. He matriculated at Queen’s College, Oxford on 15 January 1704, aged 17.

Wardour was returned unopposed as Member of Parliament for Calne at the 1727 British general election. He voted against the Administration on the civil list in 1729 and on the Hessians in 1730, but with the Administration on the army in 1732, on the Excise Bill in 1733, and on the repeal of the Septennial Act in 1734. He stood at Mitchell at the 1734 British general election but was defeated. He was returned as MP for Fowey by the Administration at a by-election on 4 July 1737, thereafter voting with them in all recorded divisions. He was returned again at the 1741 British general election and voted against Walpole’s candidate on the chairman of the elections committee on 16 December 1741.

Wardour died unmarried on 17 July 1746.

Parliament of Great Britain
Preceded by Edmund Pike Heath; Matthew Ducie Moreton	Member of Parliament for Calne; 1727–1734; With: William Duckett	Succeeded by William Duckett; Walter Hungerford
Preceded by Jonathan Rashleigh; John Hedges	Member of Parliament for Fowey; 1737–1746; With: Jonathan Rashleigh	Succeeded by Jonathan Rashleigh; Captain the Hon. George Edgcumbe
