= John Hedges (Cornwall MP) =

English diplomat and politician

John Hedges (26 February 1688 – 20 June 1737), of Finchley, Middlesex, was an English diplomat and politician who sat in the House of Commons from 1722 to 1737.

== Early life and education ==
Hedges was the fourth son of Sir William Hedges of Finchley, and his wife Anne Nicol, daughter of Paul Nicoll of Hendon Place, Middlesex. His father was a merchant trading with Turkey, Governor of Bengal and Director of the Bank of England from 1699 to 1700. Hedges was admitted at Peterhouse, Cambridge on 6 May 1706 and at Inner Temple in February 1708.

== Career ==
Hedges was returned unopposed as Member of Parliament (MP) for Mitchell at the 1722 general election. In 1726, he was sent as Envoy Extraordinary to Turin, where he assisted with negotiations on the repartition of the two Sicilies and the Milanese. At the 1727 general election, he was returned unopposed as MP for Bossiney. In 1728, he was appointed Treasurer to the Prince of Wales, and held the post for the rest of his life. He was returned unopposed as MP for Fowey at the 1734 general election. He was a close friend and patron of artist Joseph Goupy.

Hedges died unmarried on 20 June 1737.

== See also ==
- List of diplomats of the United Kingdom to Sardinia

Parliament of Great Britain
Preceded by Nathaniel Blakiston; Robert Molesworth	Member of Parliament for Mitchell; 1722–1727; With: Charles Selwyn	Succeeded by Henry Kelsall; Thomas Farrington
Preceded by Robert Corker; Henry Kelsall	Member of Parliament for Bossiney; 1727–1734; With: Robert Corker 1727-1731; James Cholmondeley 1731-1734	Succeeded by The Viscount Palmerston; Townshend Andrews
Preceded by Jonathan Rashleigh; The Viscount FitzWilliam	Member of Parliament for Fowey; 1734 – 1737; With: Jonathan Rashleigh	Succeeded by Jonathan Rashleigh; William Wardour
