= Richard Edgcumbe, 2nd Earl of Mount Edgcumbe =

British politician and music writer (1764–1839)

The Right Honourable The Earl of Mount Edgcumbe PC
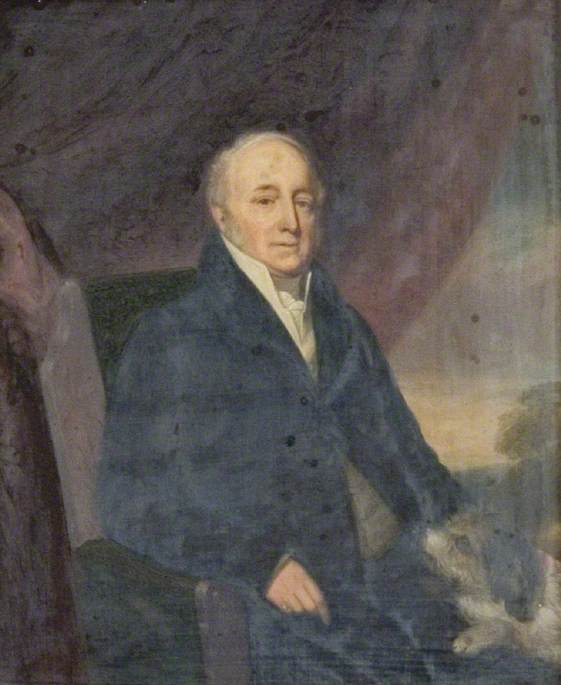

Captain of the Honourable Band of Gentlemen Pensioners
- In office 1808–1812
- Monarch: George III
- Prime Minister: The Duke of Portland; Spencer Perceval
- Preceded by: The Lord St John of Bletso
- Succeeded by: The Earl of Courtown

Personal details
- Born: 13 September 1764
- Died: 26 September 1839 (aged 75)
- Resting place: St Peter's Church, Petersham
- Spouse: Lady Sophia Hobart (d. 1806)
- Children: 5
- Parent(s): George Edgcumbe, 1st Earl of Mount Edgcumbe; Emma Gilbert

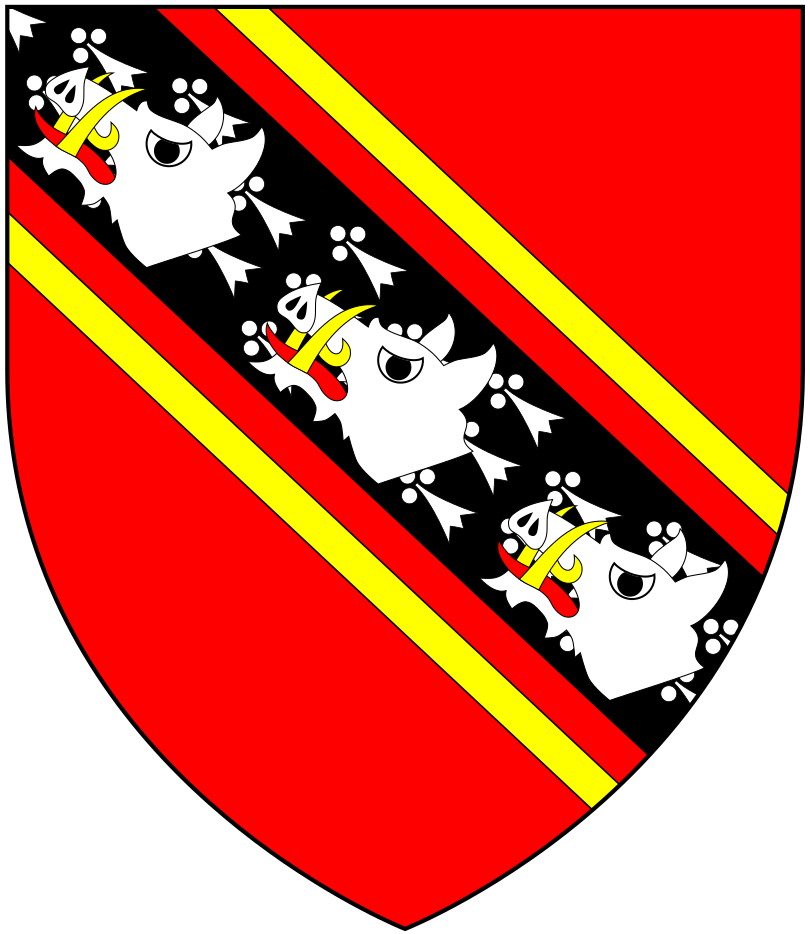
Arms of Edgcumbe, Earls of Mount Edgcumbe: Gules, on a bend ermines cotised or three boar's heads couped argent

Richard Edgcumbe, 2nd Earl of Mount Edgcumbe PC (13 September 1764 – 26 September 1839), styled Viscount Valletort between 1789 and 1795, was a British politician and writer on music.

== Background ==
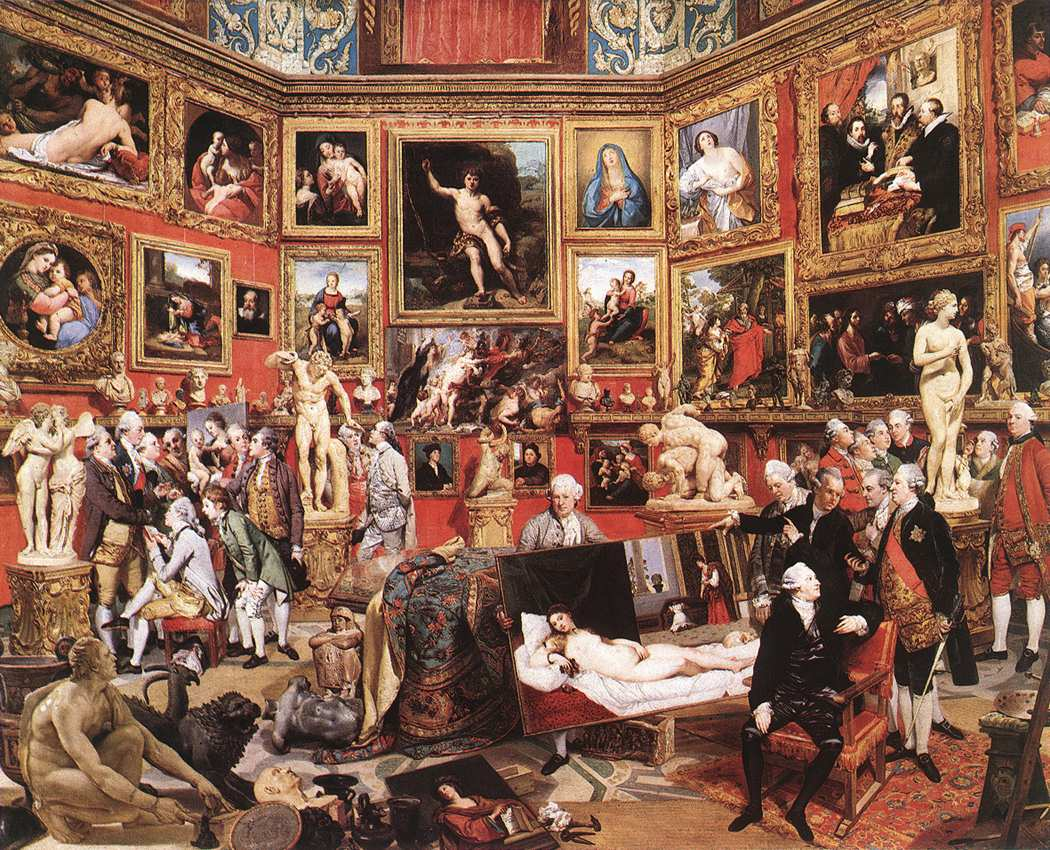
The Tribuna of the Uffizi by Johann Zoffany. Place cursor over artworks or persons to identify them.

Edgcumbe was the son of George Edgcumbe, 1st Earl of Mount Edgcumbe, and Emma, daughter of John Gilbert (archbishop of York). In the 1770s he was in Florence where Johann Zoffany included him in a painting, The Tribuna of the Uffizi, commissioned by the Queen. Edgcumbe is one of the younger figures looking over the shoulder of Charles Loraine Smith and by a group who are admiring a painting on the left of the picture.

He gained the courtesy title, Viscount Valletort, when his father was made Earl of Mount Edgcumbe in 1789.

== Political career ==
Edgcumbe was returned to parliament for Fowey in 1786. In the June 1790 election, there was a double return for the constituency, but Edgcumbe and another candidate were declared elected in March 1791. In June 1790 he was also returned for Lostwithiel, but chose to represent Fowey. In 1795 he succeeded his father in the earldom and entered the House of Lords. He served under the Duke of Portland and Spencer Perceval as Captain of the Honourable Band of Gentlemen Pensioners between 1808 and 1812. In 1808 he was sworn of the Privy Council. In the same year he was elected a Fellow of the Royal Society.

Edgcumbe was also Lord Lieutenant and Vice-Admiral of Cornwall between 1795 (succeeding his father) and 1839.

== Supporter of the Arts ==
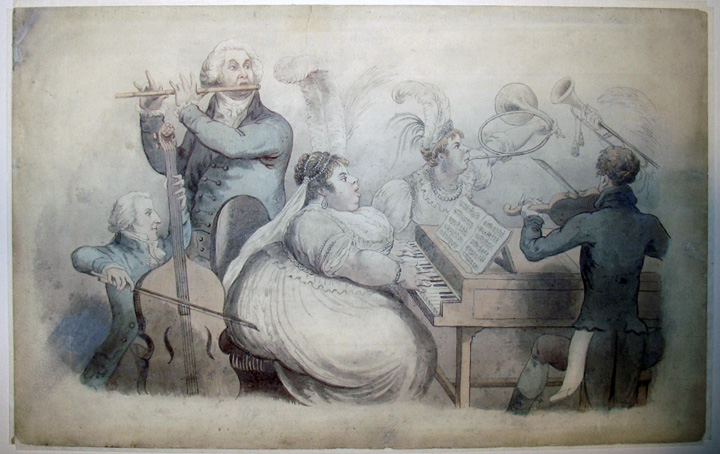
Richard Edgcumbe playing cello (left). Satirical drawing by Edward Francis Burney, 1802

Edgcumbe was a patron to the artist Nicholas Condy who made paintings of Cotehele and Mount Edgcumbe House.

== Writer on music ==
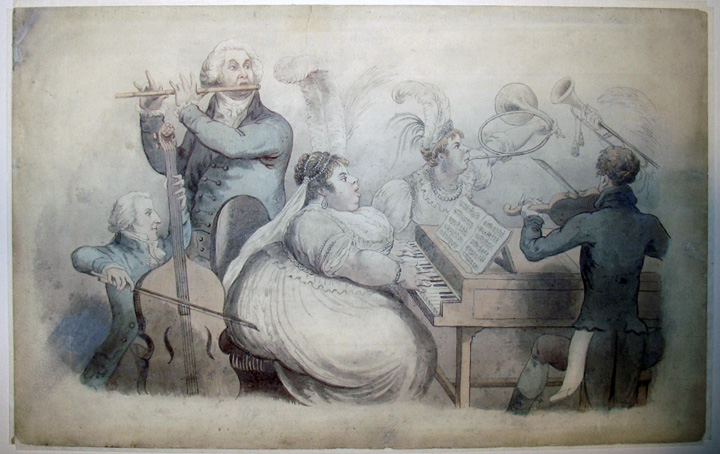
Richard Edgcumbe playing cello (left). Satirical drawing by Edward Francis Burney, 1802

Edgcumbe was the author of Musical Reminiscences of the Earl of Mount Edgcumbe, containing a list of the operas he heard from 1773 to 1823. This book has been often cited by musicologists concerned with operatic history from Mozart to Rossini. He also composed an Italian opera seria, Zenobia, which was staged but once at the King's Theatre in 1800, starring Brigida Banti.

== Family ==
Lord Mount Edgcumbe married Lady Sophia Hobart, daughter of John Hobart, 2nd Earl of Buckinghamshire, on 21 February 1789. They had five children:

- Lady Emma Sophia Edgcumbe (28 July 1791 – 28 January 1872), who married John Cust, 1st Earl Brownlow, on 17 July 1828.
- Lady Caroline Anne Edgcumbe (22 October 1792 – 10 April 1824), who married Ranald George Macdonald, 20th of Clanranald, in April 1812 and had issue.
- William Richard Edgcumbe, Viscount Valletort (19 November 1794 – 29 October 1818).
- Ernest Augustus Edgcumbe, 3rd Earl of Mount Edgcumbe (23 March 1797 – 3 September 1861).
- George Edgcumbe (28 June 1800 – 18 February 1882).

The Countess of Mount Edgcumbe died in August 1806. Lord Mount Edgcumbe remained a widower until his death in September 1839, aged 75. He died at his home on Richmond Hill and is buried at St Peter's Church, Petersham.

Parliament of Great Britain
Preceded by Philip Rashleigh; John Grant	Member of Parliament for Fowey; 1786–1795; With: Philip Rashleigh	Succeeded by Philip Rashleigh; Sylvester Douglas
Political offices
Preceded by The Lord St John of Bletso	Captain of the Honourable Band of Gentlemen Pensioners; 1808–1812	Succeeded by The Earl of Courtown
Honorary titles
Preceded by The Earl of Mount Edgcumbe	Lord Lieutenant of Cornwall; 1795–1839	Succeeded by Sir William Salusbury-Trelawny, Bt
Preceded by The Earl of Mount Edgcumbe	Vice-Admiral of Cornwall; 1795–1839	Vacant Title next held by The Earl of Mount Edgcumbe
Peerage of Great Britain
Preceded by George Edgcumbe	Earl of Mount Edgcumbe; 1795–1839	Succeeded by Ernest Edgcumbe
