= Molyneux Shuldham, 1st Baron Shuldham =

Royal Navy Admiral and colonial administrator (1717–1798)

Admiral The Right Honourable The Lord Shuldham
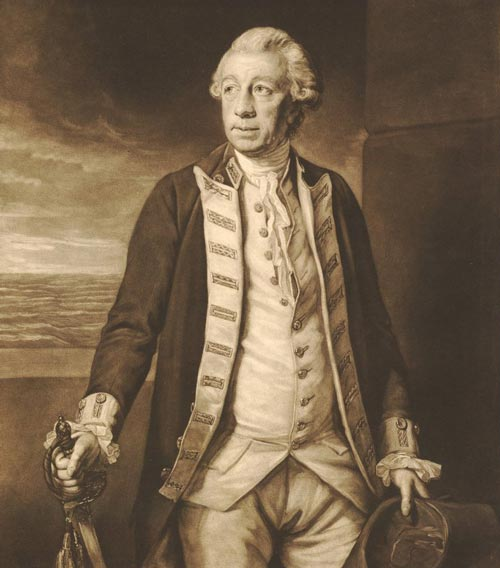
- Born: c. 1717
- Died: 30 September 1798 (aged 80–81)
- Military career
- Allegiance: Great Britain
- Branch: Royal Navy
- Rank: Admiral
- Commands: HMS Blast; HMS Sheerness; HMS Queenborough; HMS Unicorn; HMS Seaford; HMS Warwick; HMS Panther; HMS Raisonnable; HMS Marlborough; HMS Rochester; HMS Foudroyant; HMS Levant; HMS Cornwall; HMS Royal Oak; Plymouth Command
- Conflicts: War of Jenkins' Ear; Seven Years' War

Viceregal styles of The Lord Shuldham
- Reference style: His Excellency
- Spoken style: Your Excellency

Admiral Molyneux Shuldham, 1st Baron Shuldham (c. 1717 – 30 September 1798) was a Royal Navy officer and colonial administrator served for a time as the governor of Newfoundland.

== Family and early life ==
Molyneux Shuldham was born in Ireland c. 1717, and was the second son of the Reverend Lemuel Shuldham, by his wife Elizabeth, daughter of Daniel Molyneux of Ballymulvy, of County Longford. Molyneux entered the navy in 1732 as captain's servant on board HMS Cornwall, with Captain George Forbes (afterwards Earl of Granard and governor of County Longford). He afterwards served in HMS Solebay with Captain Charles Fanshawe, and for upwards of four years in HMS Falkland with Fitzroy Henry Lee. He passed his examination on 25 January 1739, being then described on his certificate as 'near twenty-two.' According to the statement in Charnock, he was not seventeen.

On 31 August 1739 he was promoted to be lieutenant of HMS Tilbury, one of the ships which went out to the West Indies with Sir Chaloner Ogle, and took part in the unsuccessful attack on Cartagena in 1741. In 1742 he was first lieutenant of her when, on 21 September, she was set on fire in a drunken squabble between a marine and the purser's boy and burnt, with a large proportion of the ship's company. Shuldham, with the captain and other officers, was tried by court-martial on 15 October but was acquitted of all blame.

== Command ==
He was promoted to commander of HMS Blast in Jamaica on 1 May 1744. On 9 November 1745 he was attacked and captured by two Spanish privateers off the Black River, after stiff resistance. Shuldham suffered mistreatment by privateers, but was compensated by the Spanish governor of Havana. After finally returning to England, he was promoted to be captain of HMS Sheerness on 12 May 1746, then employed on the coast of Scotland; in December 1748 he was appointed to HMS Queenborough, and in March 1749 to HMS Unicorn. In October 1754 he was appointed to HMS Seaford, from which, in March 1755, he was moved to the 60-gun HMS Warwick, going out to the West Indies, where, near Martinique on 11 March 1756, she fell in with a French 74-gun ship and two frigates, which overpowered and captured her.

=== Seven Years' War ===
War had not then been declared, but hostilities had been going on for several months, as Shuldham very well knew, and the story that he mistook the enemy's ships of war for merchantmen would be but little to his credit if there was any reason to suppose it true. He, with the crew of the Warwick, was sent to France, kept a prisoner at large at Poitiers for nearly two years, and returned to England in a cartel on 16 March 1758. A court-martial acquitted him of all blame for the loss of the ship, and on 25 July 1758 he was appointed to HMS Panther, in which he joined Commodore Sir John Moore in the West Indies and took part in the reduction of Guadeloupe and its dependent islands, March to May 1759 under Commodore Moore.

In July he was moved by Moore into HMS Raisonnable, which was lost on a reef of rocks at Fort Royal off Martinique as she was standing in to engage a battery on 8 January 1762, when the island was attacked and reduced by Rear-Admiral Rodney. In April Rodney appointed Shuldham to HMS Marlborough, from which a few days later he was moved by Sir George Pocock to HMS Rochester, and again by Rodney after a few weeks to Foudroyant. In mid-1763 he was transferred once more to a temporary command aboard HMS Levant, with which he returned to England in August 1763. Peace had been declared between England and France, and Shuldham was ashore on half-pay until December 1766, when he was appointed to HMS Cornwall, the guardship at Plymouth. In November 1770 he transferred to HMS Royal Oak, then commissioned in consequence of the expected rupture with Spain.

=== Governor of Newfoundland ===
On 14 February 1772 he was appointed commodore and commander-in-chief on the Newfoundland Station, which office he held for three years. He was responsible for the construction of Fort Townshend, which was completed in 1780. Shuldham visited Chateau Bay on the Labrador coast and sent his lieutenant, Roger Curtis, to inspect the northern coast and the Moravian missionaries.

== Flag rank ==
On 31 March 1775 he was promoted to be Rear-Admiral of the White. At the general election in the following autumn he was returned to the House of Commons as member for Fowey. On 29 September he was appointed commander-in-chief of the North America station from the St. Lawrence river to Cape Florida, command of which he took up on 2 February 1776 when Admiral Graves sailed for England, reporting a great scarcity of naval and ordnance stores. He arrived at Portsmouth on his way to Boston on 3 October 1775, having reported hoisting his flag on Captain John Raynor's 50-gun HMS Chatham. He arrived at Boston on 30 December after a passage of sixty-one days having become separated from HMS Orpheus in a violent gale on 21 November. He was promoted on 7 December, while on the way out, to be Vice-Admiral of the Blue. He only learnt of his promotion by letter on 23 February 1776. His work was limited to covering the operations of the troops, and preventing the colonial trade. In July 1776, he escorted Admiral Howe into New York Harbor. He was replaced by Admiral Lord Howe by letter on 25 July 1776. On 29 December 1776 Howe ordered Shuldham home on HMS Bristol, reporting his arrival from New York on 8 January, at Spithead on 23 February 1777.

On 31 July 1777 he was created a peer of Ireland with the title of Baron Shuldham. From 1778 to 1783 he was Commander-in-Chief, Plymouth. He was elected a Fellow of the Royal Society in 1777. He was promoted on 24 September 1787 to be Admiral of the Blue, and on 1 February 1793 to be Admiral of the White.

He died at Lisbon in the autumn of 1798. His body was transported back to England aboard HMS Colossus, which was also carrying many of the antique vases collected by Sir William Hamilton. Colossus was wrecked in a gale on the Isles of Scilly, but while many of Sir William's vases were lost, Shuldham's body was recovered through 'heroic efforts'. (Note: Admiral Shuldam's remains were ultimately laid to rest in Wyredsbury churchyard, Buckinghamshire on 9 January 1799.) He had married Margaret Irene, widow of John Harcourt of Ankerwycke Park but left no issue, and thus the title became extinct.

== Citations ==
Parliament of Great Britain
Preceded by Philip Rashleigh; James Modyford Heywood	Member of Parliament for Fowey; 1774–1784; With: Philip Rashleigh	Succeeded by Philip Rashleigh; John Grant
Political offices
Preceded by John Byron	Commodore Governor of Newfoundland; 1772–1775	Succeeded by Robert Duff
Military offices
Preceded by John Amherst	Commander-in-Chief, Plymouth; 1778–1783	Succeeded by Mark Milbanke
Peerage of Ireland
New creation	Baron Shuldham; 1776–1798	Extinct
