= John Grant (Fowey MP) =

John Grant (c.1720–1804) was a British nabob of the East India Company service, known as a Member of Parliament of the 1780s and banker.

== Early life ==
He was the third son in the family of seven sons and three daughters of the Rev. John Grant, parish priest of Nolton and Roch in Pembrokeshire. Of his sisters, Elizabeth married the Rev. Benjamin Hall of Llandaff and was mother of Benjamin Hall; and Margaret married the surgeon George Elliot of Laugharne and was mother of John Elliot.

== Periods in British India ==
Grant was twice in India. On his first visit he was initially a regimental surgeon for the East India Company.

Grant went to India in 1759 with the fleet conveying Eyre Coote and the 84th Regiment of Foot. He travelled with his brother Henry on the Indiaman Lennox, as a volunteer. He was given a surgeon's mate position with the 84th. Coote returned to Great Britain in 1762. Grant took part in the Bengal campaign of Thomas Adams on behalf of Mir Jafar, against the usurper Nawab Mir Qasim. By then a lieutenant, he was secretary to Adams and a military engineer at the Battle of Giria, 1763. He also took part in the Battle of Buxar the following year, with the Bengal Army under Hector Munro. He was promoted to captain, resigned and returned to Great Britain c.1765.

Grant made a later visit of 1769–1771, in association with Coote who had a second spell as East India Company commander-in-chief from 1769, during which Grant acted as his secretary. Grant was accompanied by his sister Ann. He had family motivations: to promote the military career of his brother Cornelius, and to find Ann a husband. Ann Grant married Capt. David McKenzie at Calcutta in 1771. Grant had military standing from an acting rank of Major, limited to the East Indies and restricted from the command of troops; his later use of the title Major was therefore self-proclaimed.

== Banker ==
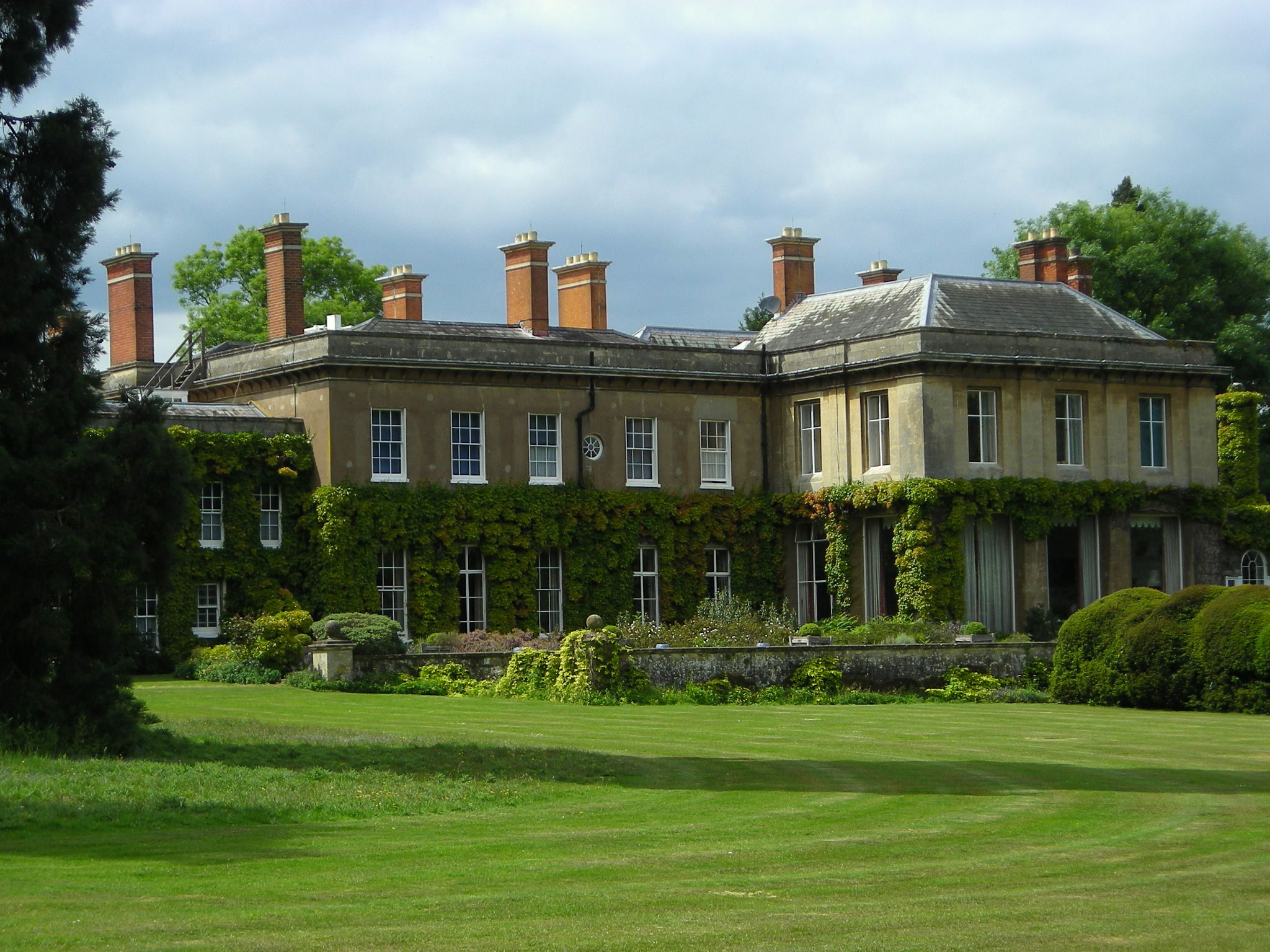
Waltham Place, 2010 photograph

Returning from India in the 1770s, Grant joined the Pybus & Co. bank of Old Bond Street, London. Its founder John Pybus (1728–1789) had been an East India Company writer. The partners included others with a British India background, such as John Call. The bank was in existence from 1773 to 1865, and became known as Call, Marten & Co.

Grant also bought the country house Waltham Place at White Waltham, in 1776. He was High Sheriff of Berkshire in 1780. Waltham Place had belonged to James Theobald the elder, who changed its name from Hill House and died in 1759; his son James Theobald the younger sold it in 1773 to the Rev. William Reid. Grant bought it from Reid.

== In politics ==
In 1780 Grant took an interest in the borough of Cricklade, which had once wooed Robert Clive, and where Robert Fletcher, son-in-law of John Pybus, had been the Member of Parliament for six years. With Paul Benfield standing, nothing came of it for Grant. In the 1784 general election he was a candidate at Fowey, where the two seats traditionally were split between the Edgcumbe and Rashleigh families. That year Philip Rashleigh was a sitting member, while Molyneux Shuldham, a naval officer who supported Lord North and Lord Sandwich, stood down. Grant was brought in, and kept out the Whig Lord Lewisham who came in third.

Grant, as expected by the Tory political manager John Robinson who paid the Edgcumbes for his place, supported William Pitt the Younger in parliament. He was asked in 1786 by the family to make way for Richard Edgcumbe, who had turned 21 and so was eligible to stand for parliament. He resigned "with the best grace he could display", applying for the stewardship of the Manor of East Hendred.

== Family ==
Grant was twice married:

1. Firstly in 1767, to Alicia Gilbert (died 1785), daughter of the Rev. Robert Gilbert D.D., canon of Salisbury Cathedral;
2. Secondly in 1788, to Charlotte Bouverie, daughter of Jacob Bouverie, 1st Viscount Folkestone.

He had one son, by his first marriage, George Grant who inherited Waltham House. He married in 1808, at Bolsover, Frances Stanley Allen of Linby, daughter of the late James Humberstone Allen.
