= George Edgcumbe, 1st Earl of Mount Edgcumbe =

Royal Navy officer and politician (1720–1795)

Admiral The Right Honourable The Earl of Mount Edgcumbe PC
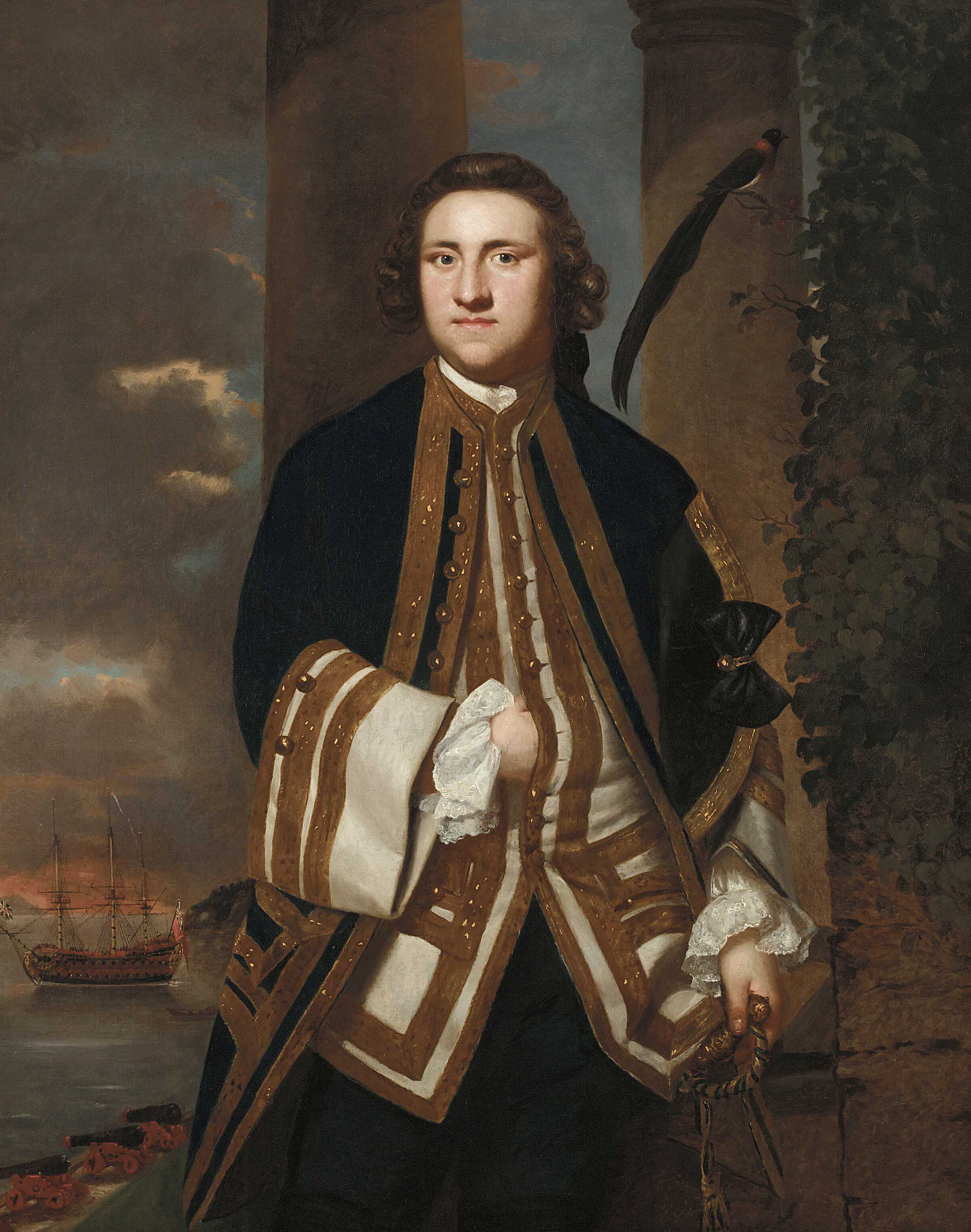
- Portrait by Sir Joshua Reynolds, 1748–1767

Member of Parliament for Fowey
- In office 1746–1761 Serving with Jonathan Rashleigh; William Wardour
- Preceded by: Jonathan Rashleigh
- Succeeded by: Jonathan Rashleigh; Robert Walsingham

Member of Parliament for Plympton Erle
- In office 1747–1747 Serving with Richard Edgcumbe
- Preceded by: Richard Edgcumbe; The Lord Sundon
- Succeeded by: William Baker; George Treby

Personal details
- Born: George Edgcumbe; 3 March 1720
- Died: 4 February 1795 (aged 74)
- Spouse: Emma Gilbert (m. 1761)
- Children: Richard Edgcumbe, 2nd Earl of Mount Edgcumbe
- Parent(s): Richard Edgcumbe, 1st Baron Edgcumbe; Matilda Furnese
- Education: Eton College

Military service
- Allegiance: Great Britain
- Branch/service: Royal Navy
- Years of service: c. 1739–1795
- Rank: Admiral of the White
- Commands: Plymouth Command
- Battles/wars: War of the Austrian Succession; Seven Years' War; Battle of Minorca (1756); Siege of Louisbourg (1758); Battle of Quiberon Bay

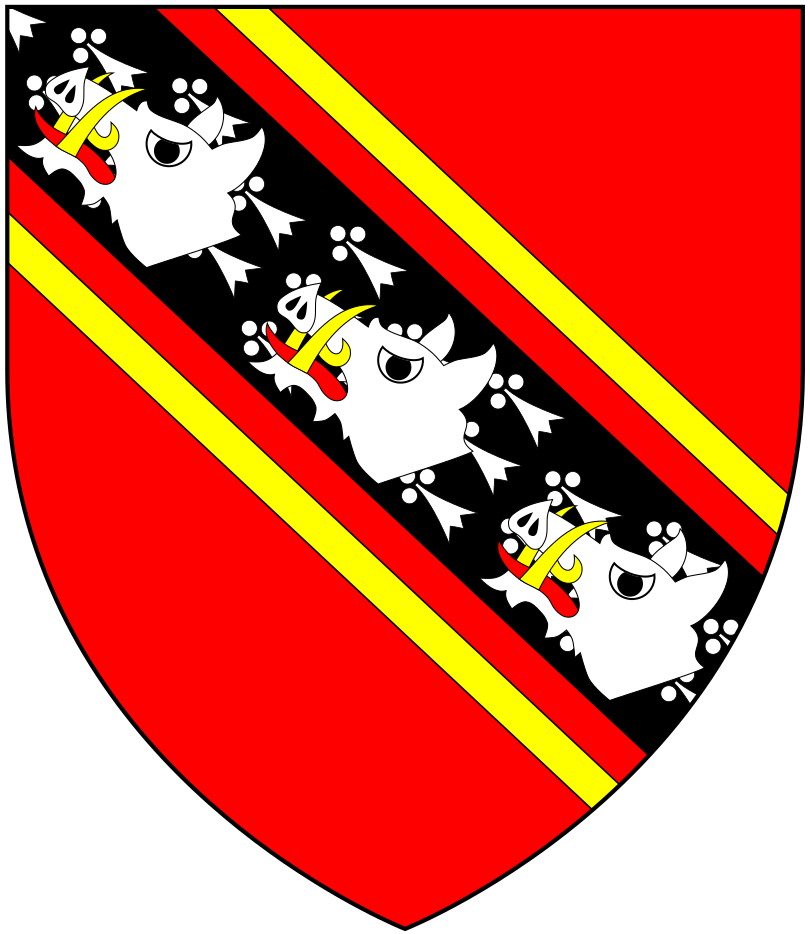
Arms of Edgcumbe: Gules, on a bend ermines cotised or three boar's heads couped argent

Admiral of the White George Edgcumbe, 1st Earl of Mount Edgcumbe, PC (3 March 1720 – 4 February 1795) was a Royal Navy officer and politician who served in the War of the Austrian Succession and Seven Years' War.

== Early life ==
Edgcumbe was the second surviving son of Richard Edgcumbe, 1st Baron Edgcumbe and his wife Matilda, the only child of Sir Henry Furnese. He is thought to have been educated at Eton.

== Career ==
Edgcumbe joined the Royal Navy as a midshipman in 1736 and was commissioned as a lieutenant on 5 October 1739; he was promoted to master and commander and made captain of the bomb vessel HMS Terrible on 3 January 1743. In the same year, Edgcumbe was appointed acting captain of the 20-gun HMS Kennington, and was promoted to post-captain on 19 August 1744. Edgcumbe commanded her in the Mediterranean until 1745, when he was advanced to the 50-gun HMS Salisbury. This ship, as part of the Western Fleet under Edward Hawke and Edward Boscawen, initially patrolled the Bay of Biscay during the War of the Austrian Succession. Her ship's surgeon was James Lind, who conducted his experiments on scurvy during such a patrol in 1747. The war ended in 1748. About this time Edgcumbe was painted by Sir Joshua Reynolds and Salisbury appears in the background.

In 1751, he was promoted to commodore and went to the Mediterranean as the commanding officer of HMS Monmouth, and the following year in the 50-gun HMS Deptford. He was still in her and with his small squadron at Menorca, when the French invaded the island on 19 April 1756. He hastily landed the marines and as many of the seamen as could be spared, and sailed the next day for Gibraltar before the French had taken any measures to block the harbour. At Gibraltar, he was joined by Admiral of the Blue John Byng, by whom he was ordered to move into the 66-gun HMS Lancaster. In the Battle of Minorca, on 20 May Lancaster was one of the ships in the van, under Rear-Admiral Temple West, which did get into action, and being unsupported suffered severely.

In 1758, still captaining Lancaster, he was in the fleet under Edward Boscawen at the siege of Louisbourg. On his return to England, with the despatches announcing this success, he was appointed to the 74-gun HMS Hero, in which he took part in the blockade of Brest during the long summer of 1759, and in the crowning Battle of Quiberon Bay on 20 November 1759. He continued in Hero, attached to the grand fleet under Hawke or Boscawen, until the death of his brother Richard on 10 May 1761, when he inherited his brother's barony, and succeeded him to Mount Edgcumbe House and as Lord Lieutenant of Cornwall. He was promoted to Rear-Admiral of the Blue on 21 October 1762, Rear-Admiral of the Red on 18 October 1770 and Vice-Admiral of the Blue on 24 October, Vice-Admiral of the White on 31 March 1775 and Vice-Admiral of the Red on 7 December, Admiral of the Blue on 29 January 1778 and Admiral of the White on 8 April 1782.

=== Political career ===
In 1746, Edgcumbe was returned as Member of Parliament for Fowey at a by-election, on his father's interest. He was considered a government Whig, but rarely attended Parliament as he was at sea. In 1747, he was appointed Clerk of the Council of the Duchy of Lancaster, an office he retained until 1762.

He was appointed Treasurer of the Household in 1765, serving until 1766, and made a Privy Councillor on 26 July. He became Commander-in-Chief, Plymouth the same year, retaining the command until 1771. In 1770, he was promoted vice-admiral and was appointed joint Vice-Treasurer of Ireland. He remained Vice-Treasurer until 1772, when he was appointed Captain of the Gentlemen Pensioners and remained Captain of the Honourable Band of Gentlemen Pensioners until resigning in 1782, when he was appointed Vice-Admiral of Cornwall. In 1784, he was again appointed joint Vice-Treasurer of Ireland, holding office until 1793.

He was created Viscount Mount Edgcumbe and Valletort in 1781 and, in 1784, he was also elected a fellow of the Royal Society. In 1789, he was granted the further title of Earl of Mount Edgcumbe.

== Personal life ==
On 16 August 1761, he had married Emma Gilbert, the only daughter of John Gilbert, Archbishop of York, and a first cousin of Robert Sherard, 4th Earl of Harborough. and they had one child:

- Richard Edgcumbe, 2nd Earl of Mount Edgcumbe (1764–1839), who married Lady Sophia Hobart, daughter of John Hobart, 2nd Earl of Buckinghamshire.

Lord Mount Edgcumbe died on 4 February 1795 and his only son, Richard, succeeded to his titles.

=== Descendants ===
Through his only son Richard, he was a grandfather of Lady Emma Edgcumbe (wife of John Cust, 1st Earl Brownlow), Lady Caroline Edgcumbe (wife of Ranald George Macdonald, 20th of Clanranald), William Edgcumbe, Viscount Valletort, Ernest Edgcumbe, 3rd Earl of Mount Edgcumbe, and George Edgcumbe.

=== Legacy ===
In English folklore, Emma has been identified as the subject of the story of the "Lady with the Ring". Lady Emma's Cottage on the Mount Edgcumbe estate is named after her. A manuscript journal, kept by Edgcumbe and Captain William Marsh, from 30 April 1742 to 1 June 1744, is in the Bodleian Library. A letter from Edgcumbe to Garrick is printed in the latter's 'Private Correspondence'. The town of Edgecomb, Maine was named for George Edgcumbe due to his support of the colonists during the American Revolution.

Parliament of Great Britain
Preceded by Jonathan Rashleigh; William Wardour	Member of Parliament for Fowey; 1746–1761; With: Jonathan Rashleigh	Succeeded by Jonathan Rashleigh; Robert Walsingham
Preceded by Richard Edgcumbe; The Lord Sundon	Member of Parliament for Plympton Erle; 1747; With: Richard Edgcumbe	Succeeded by William Baker; George Treby
Military offices
Preceded by Sir Thomas Pye	Commander-in-Chief, Plymouth; 1766–1771	Succeeded by Sir Richard Spry
Political offices
Preceded by The Earl of Powis	Treasurer of the Household; 1765–1766	Succeeded by John Shelley
Preceded by The Earl of Lichfield	Captain of the Gentlemen Pensioners; 1772–1782	Succeeded by The Lord Ferrers of Chartley
Honorary titles
Preceded by The Lord Edgcumbe	Lord Lieutenant of Cornwall; 1761–1795	Succeeded by The Earl of Mount Edgcumbe
Preceded by The Viscount Falmouth	Vice-Admiral of Cornwall; 1782–1795	Succeeded by The Earl of Mount Edgcumbe
Peerage of Great Britain
New creation	Earl of Mount Edgcumbe; 1789–1795	Succeeded by Richard Edgcumbe
New creation	Viscount Mount Edgcumbe and Valletort; 1781–1795	Succeeded by Richard Edgcumbe
Preceded by Richard Edgcumbe	Baron Edgcumbe; 1761–1795	Succeeded by Richard Edgcumbe
