= George Edgcumbe (1800–1882) =

British diplomat

Member of Parliament for Plympton Erle
- In office June - December 1826

Personal details
- Born: 23 June 1800
- Died: 18 February 1882 (aged 81)
- Spouse: Fanny Shelley (m. 1834)
- Children: 6
- Parent: Richard Edgcumbe (father)
- Relatives: George Edgcumbe (grandfather); William Edgcumbe (brother); Ernest Edgcumbe (brother); Emma Cust (sister)
- Education: Balliol College, Oxford

George Edgcumbe (23 June 1800 – 18 February 1882) was a British diplomat and politician.

== Biography ==
He was the youngest son of Richard Edgcumbe, 2nd Earl of Mount Edgcumbe. He was educated at Harrow School, and at Balliol College, Oxford. In 1834, he married Fanny Lucy, daughter of Sir John Shelley, 6th Baronet; they had 6 children.

At the general election in June 1826 he was elected as a Member of Parliament (MP) for the rotten borough of Plympton Erle, on his father's interest. However, he resigned his seat in December that year, by taking the sinecure of Steward of the Chiltern Hundreds.

He then became a diplomat, serving in Switzerland, Tuscany, and Hanover.

Parliament of the United Kingdom
Preceded by John Henry North; William Gill Paxton	Member of Parliament for Plympton Erle; June 1826 – December 1826; With: Gibbs Antrobus	Succeeded by Gibbs Antrobus; Sir Charles Wetherell
