= James Mercer (poet) =

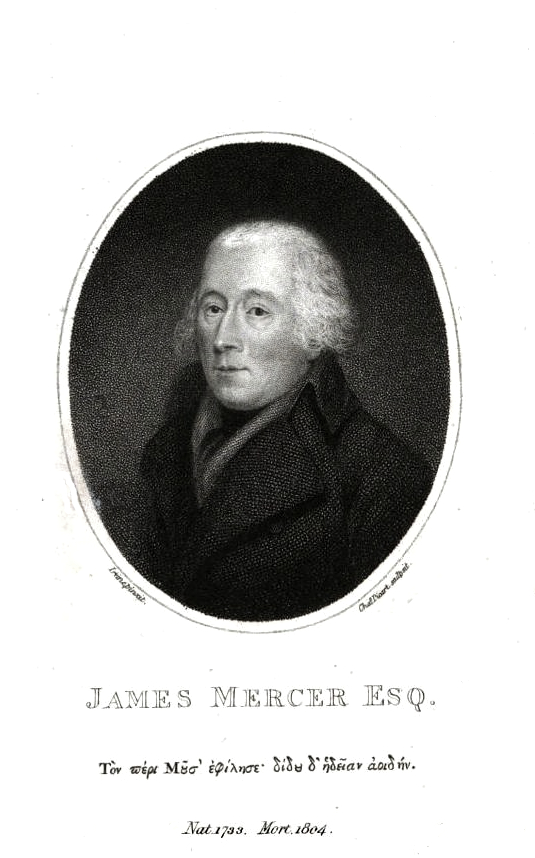
- Portrait of Mercer, engraving by Charles Picart
- Born: baptised 1734
- Died: 1804
- Occupation: army officer

James Mercer (baptised 1734 – 1804) was a Scottish soldier and poet. He is now best known as the friend of the abolitionist poet James Beattie.

== Early life ==
He was the eldest son of Thomas Mercer, of a cadet line of the Mercer family of Aldie, Perthshire, and was born in Aberdeen, Scotland on 27 February 1734; Hugh Mercer and Captain William Mercer of the Bengal Army were cousins. He was educated at Aberdeen High School, and then at Marischal College, where he graduated M.A. in 1754.

== Soldier ==
Mercer went to Paris, where his Jacobite father was then living. After his father's death in 1756, he joined a British regiment, and served in the Seven Years' War. He was under Prince Ferdinand of Brunswick through its early campaigns, and in 1759 fought at the battle of Minden. He was in 1761 presented by General David Graeme with a company in the newly raised 105th Foot, but the corps was reduced on the peace and Treaty of Paris of 1763.

Shortly afterwards Mercer purchased a company in the 49th Foot, and served for several years in Ireland. He was on good terms with Michael Cox, archbishop of Cashel; but he declined Cox's invitation to take holy orders and accept a living in his gift. In 1770 he purchased a majority in his regiment.

In 1772, however, Mercer had a professional disappointment: he was not given the succession to the lieutenant-colonelcy of Sir Henry Calder, 4th Baronet, which he had expected. He sold out of the army. It was 1790 before Calder moved, promoted to command of the 30th Foot.

== Later life ==
Mercer settled in the neighbourhood of Aberdeen, and cultivated the friendship of James Beattie. They had been at college together, and Robinson considers that they were probably on good terms from the early 1760s. He travelled for his health, mainly in the south of France.

In 1778, during the American Revolutionary War, Mercer accepted the militia rank of major from Alexander Gordon, 4th Duke of Gordon, in the Duke's unit of fencibles. At Glasgow, where the regiment was stationed, he associated with Thomas Reid and Sir William Forbes, as well as with the duke and duchess. Forbes was also in Beattie's literary circle, and the two exchanged light verse concerning him. Reid was a friend from his time at King's College, Aberdeen, when Mercer was at Marischal College, and his future wife Katherine was on good terms with Reid's three daughters.

In 1799 Beattie appointed Mercer one of his executors, together with a friend they had in common, Robert Arbuthnot of Haddo (1729–1803); Beattie himself died in 1803. Mercer settled at Sunny Bank, near Aberdeen, where he died on 27 November 1804.

== Works ==
At Marischal College Mercer had his literary taste shaped by the classical scholar Thomas Blackwell. He wrote poems influenced by Horace, as well as those owing something to his friend James Beattie.

An anonymous Lyric Poems was published in 1797, by Mercer's brother-in-law Lord Glenbervie, A second edition appeared in 1804, under Mercer's name, and the third edition was published posthumously in 1806, as Lyric Poems by the late James Mercer, with an Account of the Life of the Author by Lord Glenbervie, London. It received fulsome praise in the Edinburgh Review (January 1807) and from Sir James Mackintosh, who described the poems as "everywhere elegant and sometimes charming". Egerton Brydges quoted the "Ode to Novelty" in his Censura.

== Family ==
Mercer married, on 13 September 1763, Katherine Douglas, a beauty, and sister of Sylvester Douglas, Lord Glenbervie. She died on 3 January 1802.
