= Mount Edgcumbe House =

Stately home in Cornwall, England

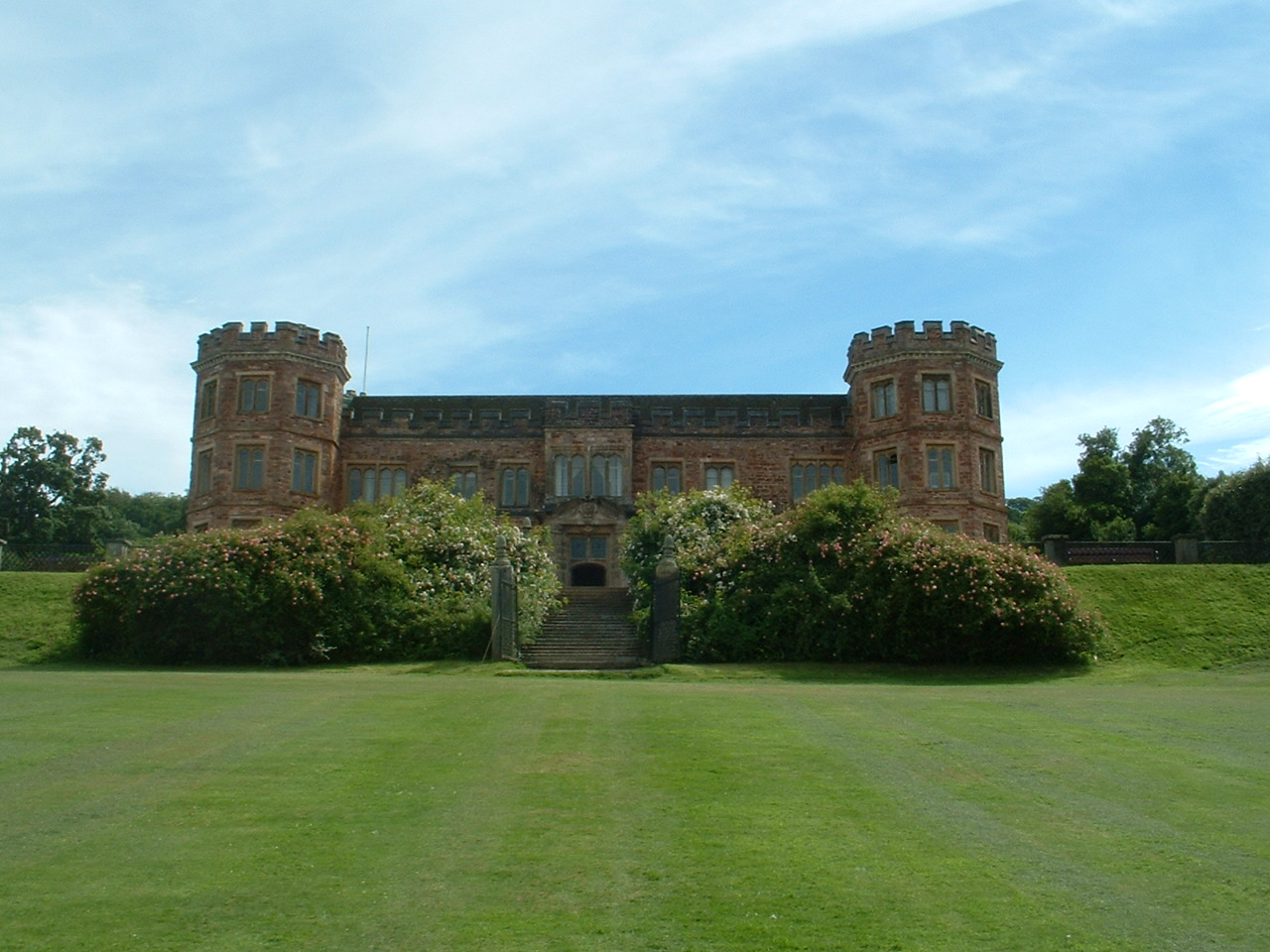

- Location within Cornwall
- 50.3543°N 4.17596°W

Listed Building – Grade II
- Official name: Mount Edgcumbe House
- Designated: 21 July 1951
- Reference no.: 1160959

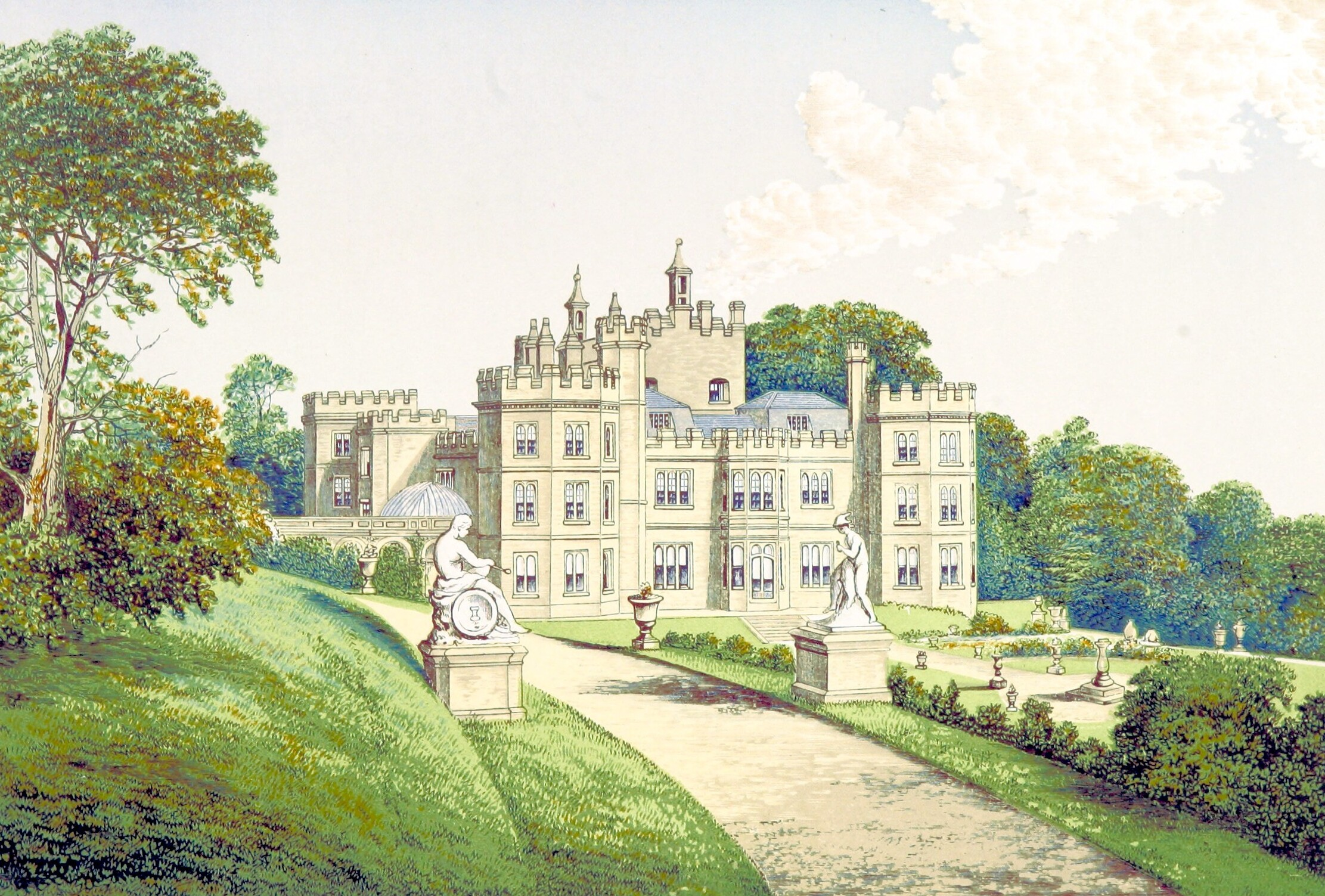
Illustrated in Morris's County Seats, 1869

Mount Edgcumbe House is a stately home in south-east Cornwall and is a Grade II listed building, whilst its gardens and parkland are listed as Grade I in the Register of Parks and Gardens of Special Historic Interest in England.

Mount Edgcumbe Country Park is situated in the parish of Maker on the Rame Peninsula, overlooking Plymouth Sound; its main entrance is in the village of Cremyll.

From Tudor times, it was the principal seat of the Edgcumbe family, many of whom served as MP before Richard Edgcumbe was raised to the peerage as Baron Edgcumbe in 1742. His 2nd son, George, was advanced to the rank of Earl in 1789.

== History ==
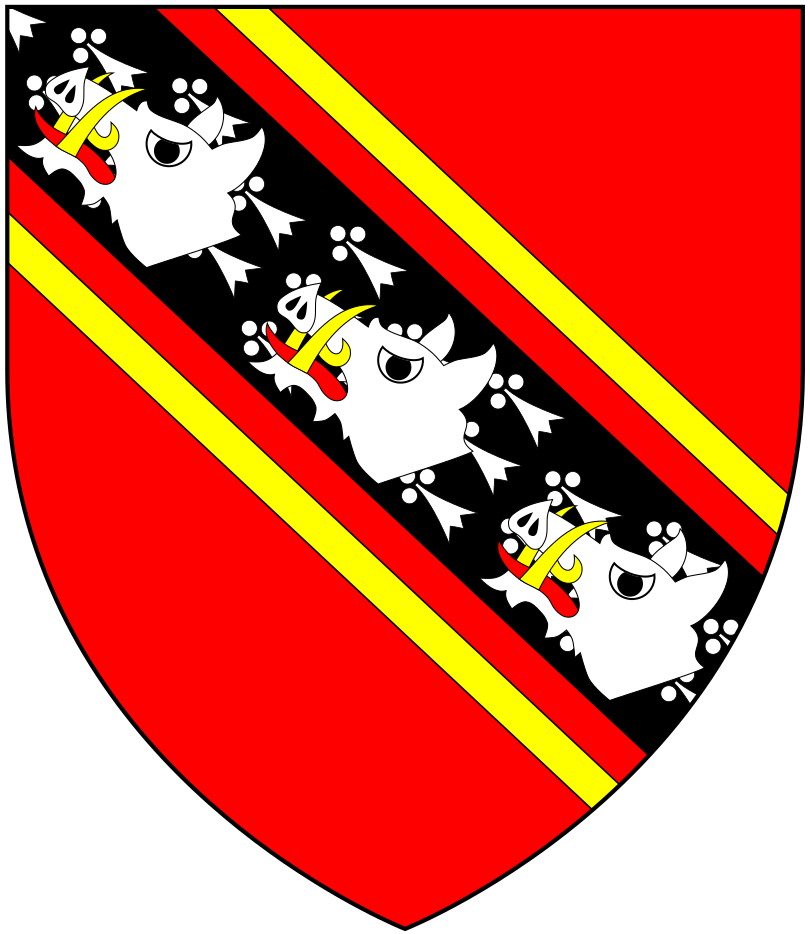
Arms of Edgcumbe, Earls of Mount Edgcumbe: Gules, on a bend ermines cotised or three boar's heads couped argent

Sir Richard Edgcumbe built the original house between 1547 and 1553 and it is said to have served as inspiration for architect Robert Smythson's Wollaton Hall. It was completely gutted during World War II by German bombs in 1941, with the restoration process beginning in 1958 at the 6th Earl's instigation. In 1971, the 7th Earl sold the estate to Cornwall County Council and Plymouth City Council, and it has been open to the public since 1988. Its interiors have been restored to 18th-century styles.

The Mount Edgcumbe House estate continues to be jointly owned by Cornwall Council and Plymouth City Council and is one of South East Cornwall's most popular historic tourist attractions. The Country Park, on the Rame Peninsula, is the earliest landscaped grounds in Cornwall and is very popular with walkers: one can walk from the Cremyll Ferry through the property to the villages of Kingsand and Cawsand. The Park, open to visitors every day all through the year from 8 am till dusk, houses the National Camellia Collection. A classic car show is held annually in the grounds, hosted by the Friends of Mount Edgcumbe and a variety of other events, which include art classes with Louise Courtnell, theatre performances, and a forestry school, are also held there.

However, the House and the adjoining Earl's Garden are only open to visitors during the summer months, from the beginning of April until the end of September.

In 1986 Mount Edgcumbe was the camp site of the "Westcountry Jamboree", a large scout camp of Devon and Cornwall scouts hosting also international guests.

== Historical features of interest ==
The gardens include the following features:

Barn Pool, a sheltered deep water anchorage used by the Vikings in 997. Offshore is the wreck of the ship Catharina von Flensburg, which went down in 1786.

Barrow - a Bronze Age burial mound, dating from about 1200 BC, re-used as a "Prospect Mound" in the 18th century. A prospect mound is an artificial mound, generally conical, placed within a garden or park to provide a viewing point to overlook the garden or park.

Blockhouse, c. 1545 - a small fort built on the shoreline during King Henry VIII's Device Forts programme, to defend the mouth of the Tamar and the Edgcumbe's town of Stonehouse opposite.

Coastguard Station at Rame, originally a Lloyds Signal Station, where signalling was done from passing ships to the station by flags during the day and by lights at night; it became a radio station in 1905, then transferred to the Coastguards c.1925. Now run by the National Coastwatch Institution.

Cremyll Ferry c. 1204 - a major ferry crossing between Devon and Cornwall since medieval times. The ferry still operates a foot passenger service between Cremyll and Plymouth.

The Deer Wall, c. 1695 - a stone wall with outer ditch protecting the amphitheatre from deer, now incomplete.

Deer on Rame Peninsula, In 1515 Sir Piers Edgcumbe was given permission by King Henry VIII to empark deer. Their descendants still roam freely throughout Rame.

Folly, c. 1747 - an artificial ruin which replaced a navigation obelisk. The folly was built from medieval stone taken from the ruined churches of St George and St Lawrence, at Stonehouse.

Formal Gardens, c. 1750 to 1820 - Italian, English and French style gardens. Recent additions to the grounds include the New Zealand and American gardens (1989) and the Jubilee Gardens (2003).

St Mary's and St Julian's Church, first mentioned in 1186 and enlarged in the 15th century, the Church of St Mary and St Julian of Maker with Rame includes the Edgcumbe Chapel - Robert Edgcumbe, 8th Earl of Mount Edgcumbe was Patron of the Living.

Milton's Temple, c. 1755 - a circular Ionian temple, with a plaque inscribed with lines from the poem Paradise Lost, "overhead up grew, Insuperable heights of loftiest shade....." John Milton, (1608–1674).

The Orangery, situated in the Italian Garden, this is thought to have been built as early as 1760. The building is now a fully licensed restaurant.

Stables c. 1850 - The stables, dairy, smithy, sawmill and stores, all essential to the running of the Mount Edgcumbe estate. This area is now open to visitors.
