= Edward Golding (MP) =

British politician (1746–1818)

Edward Golding (1746–1818), of Maiden Erlegh, Berkshire, was an English Member of Parliament.

He represented Fowey on 19 June 1799 – 1802, Plympton Erle in 1802–1806 and Downton on 27 April 1813 – 1818.
