= William Edgcumbe, Viscount Valletort =

British politician (1794–1818)

Member of Parliament for Lostwithiel
- In office 1816-1818

Personal details
- Born: 19 November 1794
- Died: 29 October 1818 (aged 23)
- Parent: Richard Edgcumbe (father)
- Relatives: George Edgcumbe (grandfather); John Hobart (grandfather); Emma Cust (sister); Ernest Edgcumbe (brother); George Edgcumbe (brother)

William Richard Edgcumbe, Viscount Valletort (19 November 1794 – 29 October 1818), was a British politician.

== Background ==
Valletort was the eldest son of Richard Edgcumbe, 2nd Earl of Mount Edgcumbe, and Lady Sophia, daughter of John Hobart, 2nd Earl of Buckinghamshire.

== Political career ==
Valletort was elected Member of Parliament for Lostwithiel in 1816, a seat he held until 1818. He unsuccessfully contested Fowey in June 1818. However, in March 1819, four months after his death, he was successfully returned on petition.

== Personal life ==
Lord Valletort died unmarried in October 1818, aged 23, predeceasing his father. His younger brother Ernest later succeeded in the earldom.

Parliament of the United Kingdom
| Preceded by Reginald Pole-Carew; John Ashley Warre | Member of Parliament for Lostwithiel; 1816–1818; With: John Ashley Warre | Succeeded by Sir Robert Wigram; Sir Alexander Grant, Bt |
