= Edgecomb (disambiguation) =

Edgecomb is a town in Lincoln County, Maine, United States.

Edgecomb or Edgecombe may also refer to:

== Places ==
- Edgecomb, Baltimore, Maryland
- Edgecombe County, North Carolina
- Fort Edgecomb, Maine

== People ==
- Anthony Edgecomb, American politician
- Gregory Edgecombe, Canadian paleontologist
- Johnny Edgecombe, British musician and criminal
- Peter Edgecomb, American politician
- Reginald Edgecombe (1885–1966), British gymnast
- Richard Edgecombe (disambiguation), various British politicians
- V. J. Edgecombe (born 2005), Bahamian basketball player
- Wilfrid Edgecombe (1871–1963), English physician

== Other ==
- USS Edgecombe, a list of ships

== See also ==
- Edgcumbe (disambiguation)
- Edgecumbe (disambiguation)
