= Edgcumbe =

Edgcumbe may refer to:

== People ==
- Ernest Edgcumbe, 3rd Earl of Mount Edgcumbe (1797–1861), British peer and politician
- George Edgcumbe, 1st Earl of Mount Edgcumbe (1720–1795), British peer, naval officer and politician
- Gerald Edgcumbe Hadow OBE (1911–1978), English Christian missionary to East Africa in the mid-twentieth century
- Peter Edgcumbe (1499–1562), English politician
- Robert Edgcumbe, 8th Earl of Mount Edgcumbe (born 1939), 8th Earl of Mount Edgcumbe
- Rose Edgcumbe (1934–2001), British psychologist and psychoanalyst
- Richard Edgcumbe (disambiguation)
- William Edgcumbe, Viscount Valletort (1794–1818), British politician
- William Edgcumbe, 4th Earl of Mount Edgcumbe (1833–1917), British courtier and Conservative politician

== Places ==
- Edgcumbe, Cornwall, a settlement
- Mount Edgcumbe Country Park, one of four designated Country Parks in Cornwall
- Mount Edgcumbe House, a stately home in south-east Cornwall
- Edgcumbe Park, residential estate in Crowthorne, England

== Other ==
- Earl of Mount Edgcumbe, a title in the Peerage of Great Britain
- GWR 4073 Class 5043 Earl of Mount Edgcumbe, a locomotive originally built as Banbury Castle in March 1936

== See also ==
- Edgecomb (disambiguation)
- Edgecumbe (disambiguation)
- Mount Edgcumbe (disambiguation)
