= Edgecumbe (disambiguation) =

Edgecumbe is a town of the North Island of New Zealand.

Edgecumbe may also refer to:

- Edgecumbe Bay, a bay in Queensland, Australia, and Cape Edgecumbe nearby
- George Edgecumbe (1845–1930), New Zealand newspaper proprietor and businessman
- Lodena Edgecumbe (1906–1978), American dancer and dance educator
- Peter Edgecumbe (died 1539) (c. 1468–1539), English courtier, sheriff and politician
- Piers Edgecumbe (c. 1609–1667), English politician

== See also ==
- Mount Edgecumbe (disambiguation)
- Edgcumbe (disambiguation)
- Edgecomb (disambiguation)
