= British Rail Class 98 =

Classification of restored steam locomotives

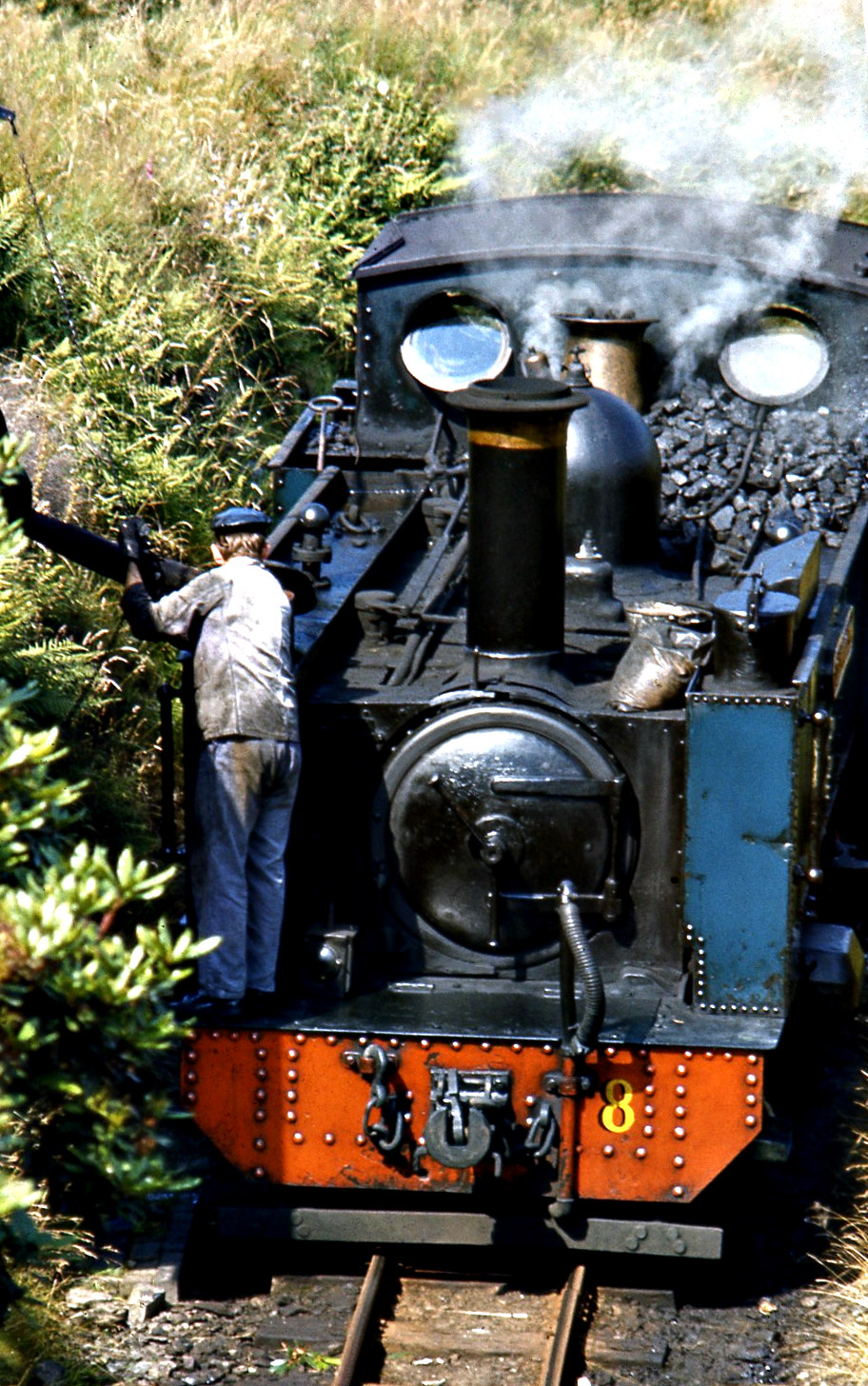
- No 8 Llywelyn apart from being allocated a TOPS code, was also painted in Rail Blue livery.
Specifications
- Gauge: 1 ft 11 3/4 in (603 mm), VoR only 4 ft 8 1/2 in (1,435 mm) standard gauge

The British Rail Class 98 is a Total Operations Processing System (TOPS) classification that has normally been used to cover all steam locomotives used on the mainline in Britain, but also has a particular usage for the three Vale of Rheidol Railway-design 2-6-2T locomotives that remained in the ownership of British Rail (BR) after the end of mainline steam traction in August 1968. The locomotives on the Vale of Rheidol Railway were the only steam locomotives ever officially to carry the British Rail corporate blue and the double arrow logo.

The number 98010 was assigned to an 0-6-0DH locomotive acquired by BR in 1987. This locomotive also worked the Vale of Rheidol and was sold along with the steam locomotives. 98010 was built by the Brecon Mountain Railway, using parts supplied by Baguley-Drewry.

== Vale of Rheidol locomotives ==
These three steam locomotives, numbered 7-9 by the Great Western Railway and British Railways, were the only ones to survive in BR's ownership after the end of mainline steam traction in August 1968. Under TOPS they were allocated Class 98 and were nominally numbered 98007-98009, but these numbers were never actually carried on the locomotives.

== Registered steam locomotives ==
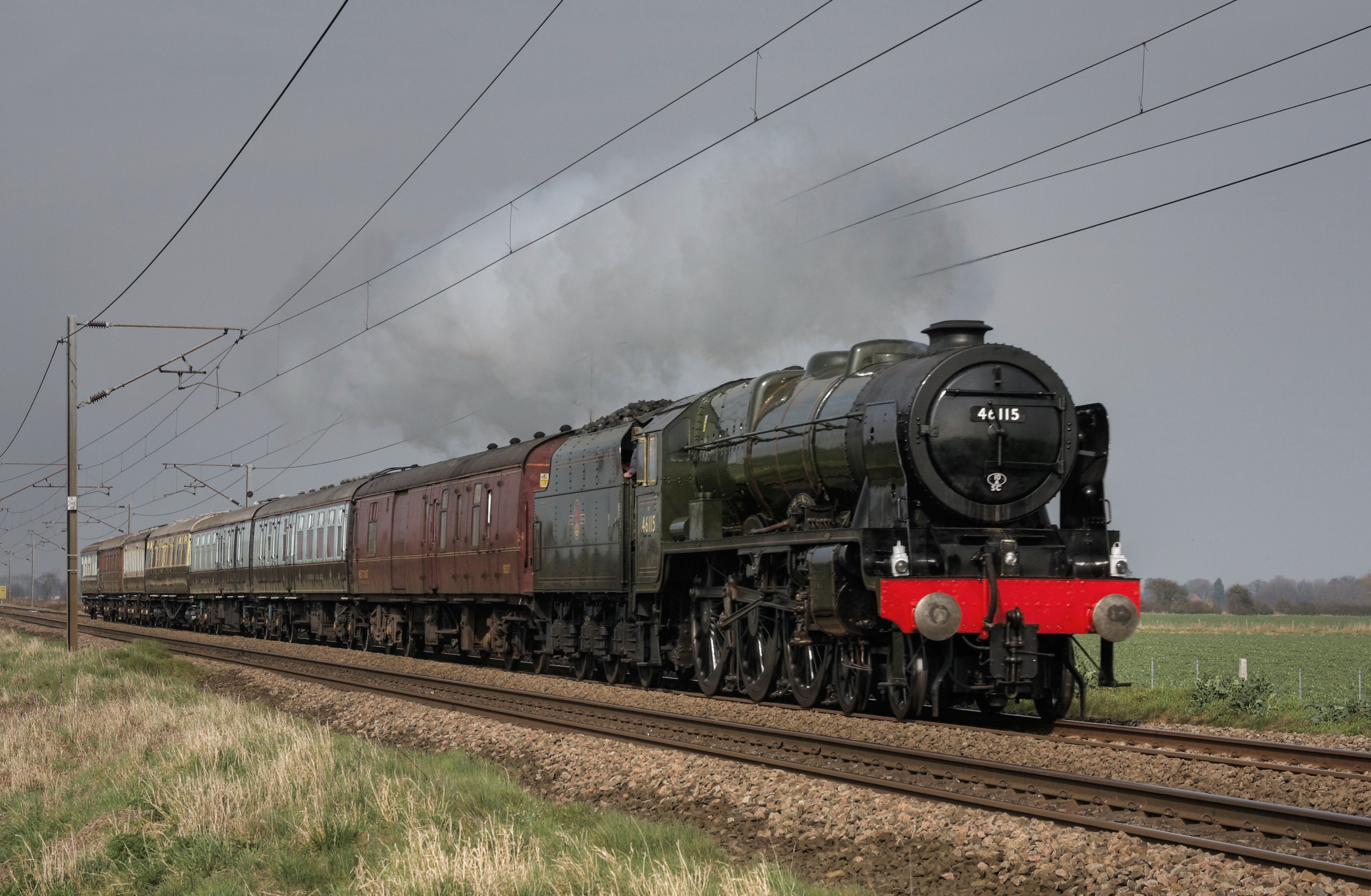
46115 Scots Guardsman - a class 7 engine, TOPS number 98715

The Class 98 series has also been used for privately owned steam locomotives registered to run on the mainline since 1971. The first two digits are the class designation, in this case 98, the remaining three digits are allocated as follows:

The third digit represents the power classification, which was assigned (with a few exceptions) to all British Railways locomotives. The narrow gauge VoRR locomotives were not assigned a power class, but for TOPS purposes were allocated to power class 0. Three standard gauge locomotives have run on the mainline that were not previously in BR stock; Lady Armaghdale (Hunslet works No. 686 of 1898) was assigned power class 1F on the basis of its tractive effort, Barbara, a Hunslet Austerity 0-6-0ST (works No. 2890 of 1943/rebuilt 1962 as 3882), assigned power class 4F on the basis of the classification given to LNER Class J94 of the same design, and the new-build A1 Pacific locomotive Tornado assigned power class 8P on the basis of the power class assigned to the LNER Peppercorn Class A1 on which it was based. Additionally, two engines in LMS stock but not BR stock were given their LMS power classification 1P.

The fourth and fifth digits usually represent the locomotive's BR number, with a few exceptions. Some ex-LNER locomotives have numbers based on their LNER pre-1946 numbers, these being Class A3 Flying Scotsman (4472), Class A4s Mallard (4468) and Sir Nigel Gresley (4498), LNER Class J36 Maude (NBR 673, LNER pre-1946 9673) and Class V2 Green Arrow (4771). Furthermore, the aforementioned locomotives not of BR origin obviously cannot have numbers based on non-existent BR numbers, so Lady Armaghdale number is based on the works number 686, Barbara on the works number of its 1962 rebuild, and Tornado is assigned the number it carries, 60163, being one greater than the last of the previous Peppercorn A1s.

In a few cases, this process results in the duplication of an existing number, so another is assigned. SR Class U 31625 is TOPS 98426 as it would otherwise duplicate GWR 7325 (TOPS 98425), BR Standard Class 8 71000 Duke of Gloucester (TOPS No. 98802) as it would otherwise duplicate GWR King Class 6000 King George V (TOPS No. 98800).

== List of locomotives assigned TOPS numbers ==
The following is a list of locomotives assigned TOPS numbers. In the power class column, * denotes that this locomotive was not ex-BR and therefore was not assigned a power class by BR. In some cases the names indicated have only been applied during the preservation period.

The given power classes are based on the ones used in the locomotive's TOPS number. BR changed the rating of a few classes e.g. LNER V2 were classified as 6MT, but this was later changed to 7P6F.

An up-to-date list of active mainline locomotives is maintained here.

TOPS number	Other number(s)	Name	Class(es)/Type	Power class	Wheel arrangement	TOPS loco diagram
98007	7	Owain Glyndŵr	VoR	0F	2-6-2T	98-0??
98008	8	Llewelyn	VoR	0F	2-6-2T	98-0??
98009	9, 1213	Prince of Wales	VoR	0F	2-6-2T	98-0??
98010	10		VoR		0-6-0DH	98-0??
98017	34	Portbury	Avonside works No. 1764 of 1917		0-6-0ST	
98150	1450		GWR 1400 Class	1P	0-4-2T	98-1??
98166	1466		GWR 1400 Class	1P	0-4-2T	98-1??
98173	673		Midland Railway 115 Class	1P	4-2-2	
98186	686	Lady Armaghdale	Hunslet works No. 686 of 1898	1F*	0-6-0T	98-1AV
98190	790	Hardwicke	LNWR Improved Precedent Class	1P	2-4-0	
98212	41312		LMS Ivatt Class 2 2-6-2T	2MT	2-6-2T	98-2JV
98219	55189		Caledonian Railway 439 Class	2P	0-4-4T	98-2EV
98221	46521		LMS Ivatt Class 2 2-6-0	2MT	2-6-0	98-2HV
98238	1638		GWR 1600 Class	2F	0-6-0PT	98-2DV
98240	3440, 3717	City of Truro	GWR 3700 Class	2P	4-4-0	98-2BV
98241	46441		LMS Ivatt Class 2 2-6-0	2MT	2-6-0	98-2CV
98243	46443		LMS Ivatt Class 2 2-6-0	2MT	2-6-0	98-2CV
98253	30053		LSWR M7 class	2P	0-4-4T	98-2GV
98254	58926, 1054		LNWR Webb Coal Tank	2F	0-6-2T	98-2FV
98273	65243, 673	Maude	NBR Class C/LNER Class J36	2F	0-6-0	98-2AV
98315	7715, L99		GWR 5700 Class	3F	0-6-0PT	98-3CV
98321	69621	A.J.Hill	GER Class L77/LNER Class N7	3MT	0-6-2T	98-3BV
98372	30072		USATC S100 Class/SR USA class	3F	0-6-0T	98-3AV
98400	41000		Midland Railway 1000 Class	4P	4-4-0	98-4BV
98406	43106		LMS Ivatt Class 4	4MT	2-6-0	98-4AV
98407	31806	River Torridge	SR U Class	4MT	2-6-0	98-4LU
98414	75014	Braveheart	BR Standard Class 4 4-6-0	4MT	4-6-0	98-4EV
98417	76017		BR Standard Class 4 2-6-0	4MT	2-6-0	98-4??
98425	7325		GWR 4300 Class	4MT	2-6-0	98-4??
98426	31625		SR U class	4MT	2-6-0	98-4LU
98427	44027		LMS Fowler Class 4F	4F	0-6-0	98-4CV
98435	80135		BR Standard Class 4 2-6-4T	4MT	2-6-4T	98-4HV
98452	7752, L94		GWR 5700 Class	4F	0-6-0PT	98-4PV
98455	4555	Warrior	GWR 4500 Class	4MT	2-6-2T	98-4DV
98457	9600		GWR 5700 Class	4F	0-6-0PT	98-4PV
98460	7760		GWR 5700 Class	4F	0-6-0PT	98-4PV
98466	9466		GWR 9400 Class	4F	0-6-0PT	98-4KV
98469	75069		BR Standard Class 4 4-6-0	4MT	4-6-0	98-4EV
98472	5572		GWR 4575 Class	4MT	2-6-2T	98-4DV
98476	76079		BR Standard Class 4 2-6-0	4MT	2-6-0	98-4??
98478	68078		Hunslet Austerity 0-6-0ST/LNER Class J94	4F	0-6-0ST	98-4BV
98479	80079		BR Standard Class 4 2-6-4T	4MT	2-6-4T	98-4HV
98480	80080		BR Standard Class 4 2-6-4T	4MT	2-6-4T	98-4HV
98482	(3882)	Barbara	Hunslet Austerity 0-6-0ST	4F*	0-6-0ST	98-4IV
98484	76084		BR Standard Class 4 2-6-0	4MT	2-6-0	98-4??
98488	4588		GWR 4575 Class	4MT	2-6-2T	98-4DV
98494	65894		LNER Class J27	4F	0-6-0	98-4NV
98498	80098		BR Standard Class 4 2-6-4T	4MT	2-6-4T	98-4HV
98500	45000, 5000		LMS Stanier Class 5 4-6-0	5MT	4-6-0	98-5BV
98502	7802	Bradley Manor	GWR 7800 Class	5MT	4-6-0	98-5HV
98505	45305, 5305	Alderman A. E. Draper	LMS Stanier Class 5 4-6-0	5MT	4-6-0	98-5BV
98506	61306	Mayflower	LNER Thompson Class B1	5MT	4-6-0	98-5KV
98507	45407, 5407	Lancashire Fusilier	LMS Stanier Class 5 4-6-0	5MT	4-6-0	98-5BV
98510	45110	RAF Biggin Hill	LMS Stanier Class 5 4-6-0	5MT	4-6-0	98-5BV
98512	7812	Erlestoke Manor	GWR 7800 Class	5MT	4-6-0	98-5HV
98519	7819	Hinton Manor	GWR 7800 Class	5MT	4-6-0	98-5HV
98525	45025		LMS Stanier Class 5 4-6-0	5MT	4-6-0	98-5BV
98526	30926, 926	Repton	SR V Schools class	5P	4-4-0	98-5EV
98528	45428	Eric Treacy	LMS Stanier Class 5 4-6-0	5MT	4-6-0	98-5BV
98529	73129		BR Standard Class 5	5MT	4-6-0	98-5IV
98530	4930	Hagley Hall	GWR 4900 Class	5MT	4-6-0	98-5GV
98531	45231	Sherwood Forester	LMS Stanier Class 5 4-6-0	5MT	4-6-0	98-5BV
98532	44932		LMS Stanier Class 5 4-6-0	5MT	4-6-0	98-5BV
98536	4936	Kinlet Hall	GWR 4900 Class	5MT	4-6-0	98-5GV
98549	4965	Rood Ashton Hall	GWR 4900 Class	5MT	4-6-0	98-5GV
98553	4953	Pitchford Hall	GWR 4900 Class	5MT	4-6-0	98-5GV
98560	6960	Raveningham Hall	GWR 6959 Class	5MT	4-6-0	98-5GV
98564	61264, 1264		LNER Thompson Class B1	5MT	4-6-0	98-5KV
98565	42765, 2765		LMS Hughes Crab	5MT	2-6-0	98-5CV
98567	44767	George Stephenson	LMS Stanier Class 5 4-6-0	5MT	4-6-0	98-5AV
98568	42968, 2968		LMS Stanier Class 5 2-6-0	5MT	2-6-0	98-5JV
98571	44871, 4871		LMS Stanier Class 5 4-6-0	5MT	4-6-0	98-5BV
98572	5972	Olton Hall/Hogwarts Castle	GWR 4900 Class	5MT	4-6-0	98-5GV
98577	30777, 777	Sir Lamiel	LSWR N15 class	5P	4-6-0	98-5DV
98596	73096		BR Standard Class 5	5MT	4-6-0	98-5IV
98598	6998	Burton Agnes Hall	GWR 6959 Class	5MT	4-6-0	98-5GV
98605	62005, 2005	Lord of the Isles	LNER Thompson/Peppercorn Class K1	6MT	2-6-0	98-6BV
98625	30825, 825		LSWR S15 class	6F	4-6-0	98-6GV
98628	30828, 828	Harry A. Frith	LSWR S15 class	6F	4-6-0	98-6GV
98641	30841, 841		LSWR S15 class	6F	4-6-0	98-6GV
98642	61994, 3442	The Great Marquess	LNER Class K4	6MT	2-6-0	98-6CV
98690	45690, 5690	Leander	LMS Jubilee Class	6P5F	4-6-0	98-6AV
98693	45593, 5593	Kolhapur	LMS Jubilee Class	6P5F	4-6-0	98-6AV
98696	45596, 5596	Bahamas	LMS Jubilee Class	6P5F	4-6-0	98-6AV
98699	45699, 5699	Galatea	LMS Jubilee Class	6P5F	4-6-0	98-6AV
98700	70000	Britannia	BR Standard Class 7	7P	4-6-2	98-7GV
98701	34101	Hartland	Southern Railway Rebuilt West Country Class	7P5F	4-6-2	98-7DV
98702	46100,6100	Royal Scot	LMS Rebuilt Royal Scot Class	7P	4-6-0	98-7BV
98709	53809, 89		S&DJR Class 7F	7F	2-8-0	98-7CV
98713	70013	Oliver Cromwell	BR Standard Class 7	7P	4-6-2	98-7GV
98715	46115, 6115	Scots Guardsman	LMS Rebuilt Royal Scot Class	7P	4-6-0	98-7BV
98716	34016	Bodmin	Southern Railway Rebuilt West Country Class	7P5F	4-6-2	98-7DV
98727	34027	Taw Valley	Southern Railway Rebuilt West Country Class	7P5F	4-6-2	98-7DV
98728	5029	Nunney Castle	GWR 4073 Class	7P	4-6-0	98-7FV
98729	7029	Clun Castle	GWR 4073 Class	7P	4-6-0	98-7FV
98730	34028	Eddystone	Southern Railway Rebuilt West Country Class	7P5F	4-6-2	98-7DV
98743	5043	Earl of Mount Edgcumbe	GWR 4073 Class	7P	4-6-0	98-7FV
98746	34046	Braunton	Southern Railway Rebuilt Battle of Britain Class	7P5F	4-6-2	98-7DV
98750	30850, 850	Lord Nelson	SR Lord Nelson class	7P	4-6-0	98-7EV
98751	5051	Earl Bathurst	GWR 4073 Class	7P	4-6-0	98-7FV
98767	34067, 21C167	Tangmere	Southern Railway Unrebuilt Battle of Britain Class	7P5F	4-6-2	98-7DV
98771	60800, 4771	Green Arrow	LNER Class V2	7P6F	2-6-2	98-7HV
98772	34072	257 Squadron	Southern Railway Unrebuilt Battle of Britain Class	7P5F	4-6-2	98-7DV
98780	5080	Defiant	GWR 4073 Class	7P	4-6-0	98-7FV
98792	34092	City of Wells	Southern Railway Unrebuilt West Country Class	7P5F	4-6-2	98-7DV
98800	6000	King George V	GWR 6000 Class	8P	4-6-0	98-8EV
98801	46201, 6201	Princess Elizabeth	LMS Princess Royal Class	8P	4-6-2	98-8CV
98802	71000	Duke of Gloucester	BR Standard Class 8	8P	4-6-2	98-8JV
98803	46203, 6203	Princess Margaret Rose	LMS Princess Royal Class	8P	4-6-2	98-8CV
98805	35005	Canadian Pacific	SR Merchant Navy class	8P	4-6-2	98-8DV
98809	60009, 4488	Union of South Africa	LNER Class A4	8P6F	4-6-2	98-8AV
98818	35018	British India Line	SR Merchant Navy class	8P	4-6-2	98-8DV
98819	60019, 4464	Bittern, Dominion of New Zealand	LNER Class A4	8P6F	4-6-2	98-8AV
98823	6023	King Edward II	GWR 6000 Class	8P	4-6-0	98-8EV
98824	6024	King Edward I	GWR 6000 Class	8P	4-6-0	98-8EV
98828	35028	Clan Line	SR Merchant Navy class	8P	4-6-2	98-8DV
98829	46229, 6229	Duchess of Hamilton	LMS Coronation Class	8P	4-6-2	98-8BV
98832	60532, 532	Blue Peter	LNER Peppercorn Class A2	8P7F	4-6-2	98-8FV
98834	46233, 6233	Duchess of Sutherland	LMS Coronation Class	8P	4-6-2	98-8IV
98851	48151		LMS Stanier Class 8F	8F	2-8-0	98-8IV
98857	2857		GWR 2800 Class	8F	2-8-0	98-8HV
98863	60163	Tornado	LNER Peppercorn Class A1	8P*	4-6-2	
98868	60022, 4468	Mallard	LNER Class A4	8P6F	4-6-2	98-8AV
98872	60103, 4472	Flying Scotsman	LNER Class A3	7P6F	4-6-2	98-8GV
98873	48773, 8233		LMS Stanier Class 8F	8F	2-8-0	98-8IV
98898	60007, 4498	Sir Nigel Gresley	LNER Class A4	8P6F	4-6-2	98-8AV
98920	92220	Evening Star	BR Standard Class 9F	9F	2-10-0	98-9AV
