= List of British Rail classes =

British locomotive classification system

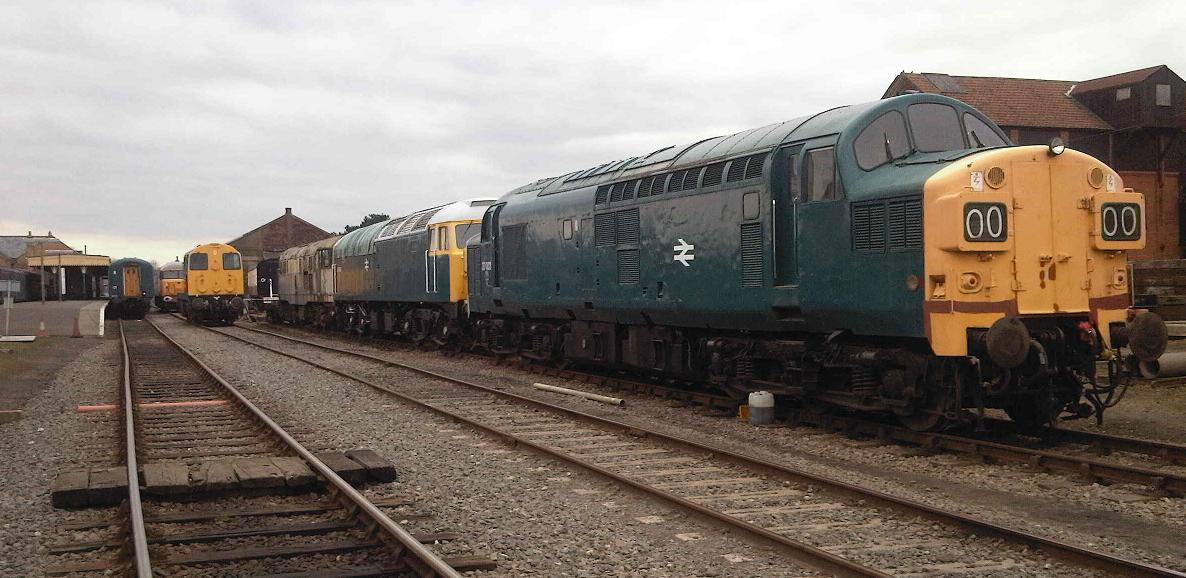
A range of diesel locomotives (Classes 37, 47, 31, 20 and 56) at Dereham

This article lists the wide variety of locomotives and multiple units that have operated on Great Britain's railway network, since Nationalisation in 1948.

British Rail used several numbering schemes for classifying its steam locomotive types and other rolling stock, before settling on the TOPS computer system in the late 1960s. TOPS has remained in use ever since.

== Steam locomotives ==
- Steam locomotives in use after 1968: Class 98

== Diesel and electric locomotives ==
- Diesel locomotives: Classes 01–70
- DC electric and electro-diesel locomotives: Classes 70–79
- AC electric locomotives: Classes 80–96, 99
- Departmental locos (those not in revenue-earning use): Class 97
- Miscellaneous locomotives, including builders' demonstrators.

== Shipping fleet ==
British Rail's shipping fleet

== Diesel multiple units ==
- Units with mechanical or hydraulic transmission: Classes 100-199
- Units with electric transmission: Classes 200–299

== Electric multiple units ==
- Overhead AC and Dual-voltage EMUs: Classes 300–399 and 700-799
- Southern Region DC third rail EMUs: Classes 400–499
- Other DC EMUs: Classes 500–599
- High-speed EMUs: Classes 800-899

== Alternative Fuel multiple units ==
- British Rail Class 600
- British Rail Class 614

== Departmental multiple units ==
- Classes 900-999

== See also ==
- British Rail coach type codes
- List of British Railways steam locomotives as of 31 December 1967
- List of British Railways shed codes
- British Rail train classes
