= George Edgcumbe =

George Edgcumbe may refer to:

- George Edgcumbe, 1st Earl of Mount Edgcumbe (1720–1795), British peer, naval officer and politician, MP for Fowey 1746–61
- George Edgcumbe (1800–1882), British diplomat and politician, MP for Plympton Erle 1826

== See also ==
- George Edgecumbe (1845–1930), New Zealand newspaper proprietor and businessman
- Edgcumbe (disambiguation)
