= List of British Railways steam locomotives as of 31 December 1967 =

List of British Railways steam locomotives as of 31 December 1967. The following is a list of British Railways steam locomotives as of the end of 1967. With main line steam ending in August 1968, these are the ones that survived to the last year. By this stage, steam locomotive stock had been severely reduced from over 20,000 locomotives at nationalisation to fewer than 370.

== Locomotive classes ==
Of the remaining 359 standard gauge steam locomotives, all were robust, two-cylinder tender engines to seven classes. The vast majority were to two ex-LMS classes designed by William Stanier; 151 ex-LMS Black Fives and 150 ex-LMS 8Fs. The remaining 58 were an assortment of four BR standard classes and one other ex-LMS class. All were based on the London Midland Region. They were employed mostly on freight workings in industrial North-West England. Main line steam would end with the Fifteen Guinea Special on 11 August 1968.

== Capital stock ==
Capital Stock List
Nos	Class	No. in class	Power Class	Wheel arr.	Notes
7–9	Rheidol Tank	3	Unclassified	2-6-2T	Narrow gauge
44663–65/72/83–90; 44708–09/11/13/15/28/35/58/61/77/80–81; 44800/02–04/06–07/09/15–16/18/29/36/38/42/45–46/48/51/55/64/68/71/74/77–78/84/88–91/94/97/99; 44903/06/10/26/29/32/40/42/47/49–50/63/65/71; 45001/05/13/17/25/27/34/38/46/54–55/65/73/76/95–96; 45101/04/10/14/31/33–34/49–50/56/87/90; 45200–03/06/09/12/27/31/53–55/58/60/62/68–69/79/82/84/87/90/94/96; 45305/10/12/16/18/30/42/45/50/53/75–76/81–82/86/88/90–92/94–95/97; 45407/11/20–21/24/26/35–36/44–45/47/93	ex-LMS Stanier Class 5 4-6-0	151	5MT	4-6-0	44871, 44781, and 45110 worked the Fifteen Guinea Special on 11 August 1968.
48010/12/26/33/36/45–46/56/60/62–63/77/81/90; 48107/11/15/17/24/32/51/53/67–68/70/82/91–93/97; 48200–01/06/12/24/47/52–53/57/67/72/78/82/92/94; 48304–05/07–08/17/19/21–23/25/27/29/34–35/38/40/44–45/48/51/56/65/68–69/73–74/80/84/90/92–93; 48400/10/21/23–24/33/37/41–42/45/48/51/53/65/67–68/71/76/91–93; 48503–04/07/10/29/32–33/44/46/49/51/53/59; 48609/12/14/17/20/26/31–32/39/46/52/65–66/77–78/83–84/87/92; 48700/02/15/20/22–23/27/30/40/44–46/49–50/52/63/65/73/75	ex-LMS Stanier Class 8F	150	8F	2-8-0	
43006/08/19/27/33/106	ex-LMS Ivatt Class 4	6	4MT	2-6-0	
70013	BR Standard Class 7	1	7MT	4-6-2	Hauled the Fifteen Guinea Special on 11 August 1968.
73000/10/33–35/40/50/53/67/69; 73125–26/28/31–36/38/42–43/57	BR Standard Class 5	23	5MT	4-6-0	
75009/19–21/27/32/34/41/48/62	BR Standard Class 4 4-6-0	10	4MT	4-6-0	
92004/09/54/69/77/88/91/94; 92118/53/60/65/67; 92212/18/23/33/49	BR Standard Class 9F	18	9F	2-10-0	

== Departmental stock ==
Departmental stock was numbered in a different series to the capital stock.

Departmental Stock List
Departmental Nos	Class	No. in class	Power Class	Wheel arr.	Notes
30–32	ex-LNER Thompson Class B1	3	Unclassified (previously 5MT)	4-6-0	Carriage heaters

== Post-1967 survivals ==
The locomotives of the Vale of Rheidol Railway, narrow gauge, acquired from the GWR but which had been transferred to the London Midland Region survived the end of main line steam, remaining in BR stock until 1989 when the VoR was privatised and preserved. There were also three ex-LNER Thompson Class B1s in departmental stock used as carriage heaters on the Eastern Region. These latter engines had their couplings removed so they could not haul trains, though they could still propel themselves. These were withdrawn in 1968.
