= Mount Edgecumbe =

Mount Edgecumbe may refer to:

== Mountains ==
- Mount Edgecumbe (Alaska), a dormant volcano located on Kruzof Island in Alaska, USA
- Putauaki or Mount Edgecumbe, a volcanic cone in the Bay of Plenty Region of New Zealand
- Mount Edgecumbe (Southland) a mountain in Fiordland, New Zealand

== Other places ==
- Mt. Edgecumbe High School, a boarding high school in Sitka, Alaska
- Mount Edgcumbe House in Cornwall, United Kingdom
- Mount Edgcumbe Country Park in Cornwall, United Kingdom

== See also ==
- Earl of Mount Edgcumbe
- Mount Edgecombe, a gated community in KwaZulu-Natal, South Africa
