= Richard Edgcumbe =

Richard Edgcumbe (sometimes spelt Edgecumbe and Edgecombe) may refer to:

- Sir Richard Edgcumbe (died 1489) (c. 1440–1489), courtier and politician, fought at Bosworth
- Sir Richard Edgcumbe (died 1562) (1499–1562), courtier and politician
- Sir Richard Edgcumbe (died 1639), Cornish MP 1586 to 1628
- Sir Richard Edgcumbe (1640–1688), MP for Launceston and Cornwall
- Richard Edgcumbe, 1st Baron Edgcumbe (1680–1758), British peer and politician
- Richard Edgcumbe, 2nd Baron Edgcumbe (1716–1761), British peer and politician
- Richard Edgcumbe, 2nd Earl of Mount Edgcumbe (1764–1839), British politician and writer on music
- Richard Edgecombe (born c. 1540) (c. 1540 – after 1587), MP for Totnes

== See also ==
- Edgcumbe (disambiguation)
