= Mount Edgcumbe =

Mount Edgcumbe may refer to:

Places

- Mount Edgcumbe Country Park, in Cornwall, United Kingdom
- Mount Edgcumbe House, located within Mount Edgcumbe Country Park
- Mount Edgecombe, KwaZulu-Natal, a sugar-growing town in KwaZulu-Natal, South Africa

People

- Earl of Mount Edgcumbe, a title in the peerage of the United Kingdom:
  - George Edgcumbe, 1st Earl of Mount Edgcumbe (1720–95), British peer, naval officer and politician
  - Richard Edgcumbe, 2nd Earl of Mount Edgcumbe (1764–1839), British politician and writer on music
  - Ernest Edgcumbe, 3rd Earl of Mount Edgcumbe (1797–1861), British peer and politician
  - William Edgcumbe, 4th Earl of Mount Edgcumbe (1833–1917), British courtier and Conservative politician
  - Piers Edgcumbe, 5th Earl of Mount Edgcumbe (1865–1944), British soldier

Other

- HMS Mount Edgcumbe, Royal Navy ship, previously commissioned as the training establishment HMS Conway, originally built in 1822 as HMS Winchester
