= USS Edgecombe =

USS Edgecombe is a name used more than once by the U.S. Navy:

- USS Edgecombe (ID-3894), a World War I cargo ship used by the Navy.
- USS Edgecombe (APA-164), an attack transport commissioned 30 October 1944.

== See also ==
- SS Edgecombe, an Altair-class destroyer tender
