= GWR Rheidol Tanks =

Class of 3 British 2-6-2T locomotives

GWR Rheidol Tank
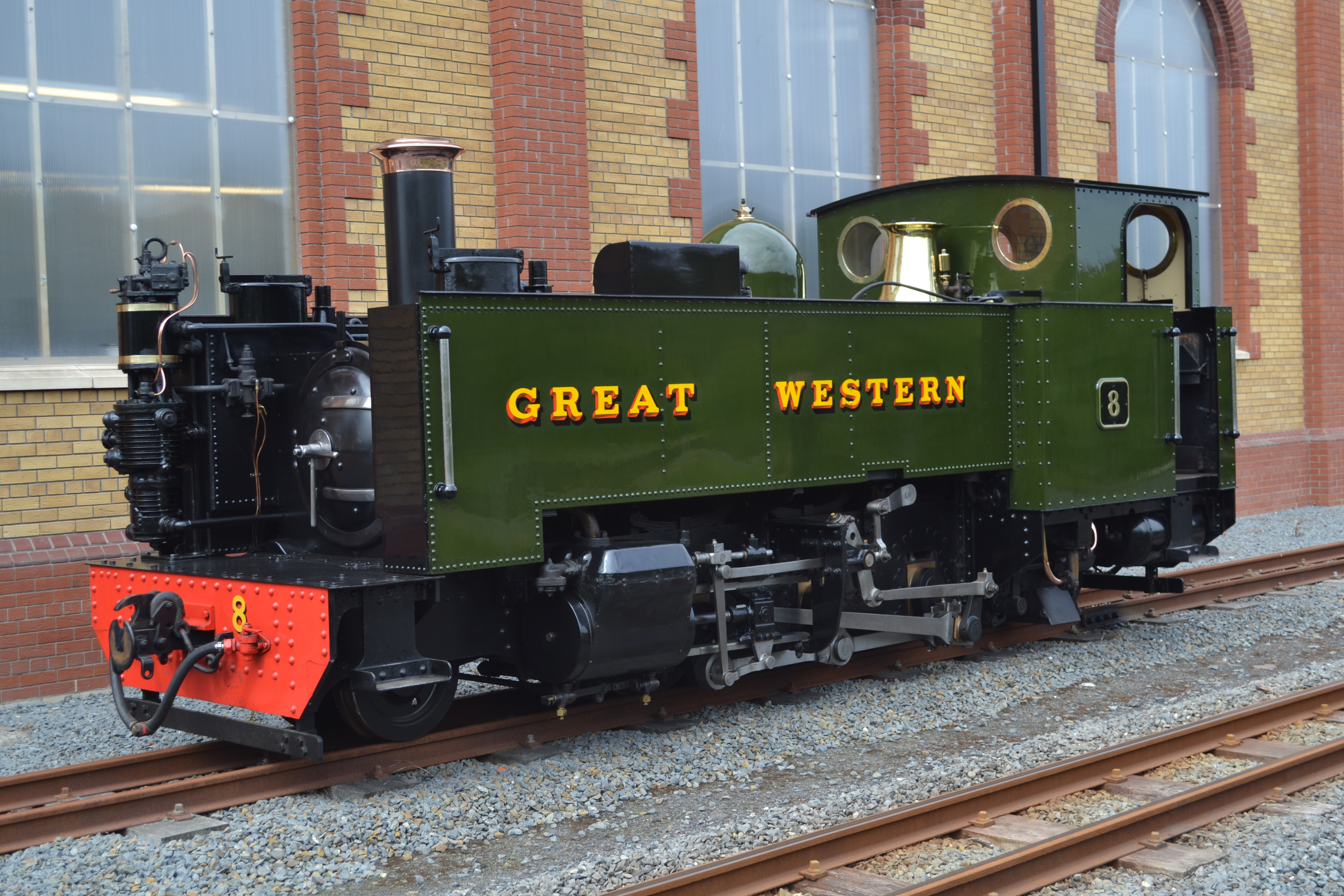
- Llywelyn outside the locomotive works in Aberystwyth in 2015
Type and origin
- Power type: Steam
- Designer: Charles Collett
- Builder: GWR Swindon Works
- Order number: Nos. 7 & 8: Lot 227; No. 9: none
- Build date: 1923–24
- Total produced: 3
Specifications
- Configuration
  - Whyte: 2-6-2T
  - UIC: 1′C1′
- Gauge: 1 ft 11 3/4 in (603 mm)
- Leading dia.: 2 ft 0 in (610 mm)
- Coupled dia.: 2 ft 6 in (762 mm)
- Trailing dia.: 2 ft 0 in (610 mm)
- Fuel type: Coal
- Boiler pressure: 165 lbf/in^{2} (1.14 MPa)
- Cylinders: Two, outside
- Cylinder size: 11 1/2 in × 17 in (292 mm × 432 mm)
- Valve gear: Walschaerts
- Loco brake: Air brakes
- Train brakes: Air brakes
- Couplers: Chopper
Performance figures
- Maximum speed: 20 mph (32 km/h)
- Tractive effort: 10,510 lbf (46.75 kN)
Career
- Operators: Great Western Railway; British Railways; Vale of Rheidol Railway
- Number in class: 3
- Numbers: 7, 8, 9 (1213)
- Locale: Aberystwyth
- Delivered: October 1923
- Current owner: Vale of Rheidol Railway Ltd
- Disposition: All preserved

The GWR Rheidol Tanks are a fleet of 2-6-2T steam locomotives of the Great Western Railway design built between 1923 and 1924. They were designed by the railway's Chief Mechanical Engineer, Charles Collett, for working services on the Vale of Rheidol Railway between Aberystwyth and Devil's Bridge (Pontarfynach).

== Background ==
Prior to the railway grouping in 1923, the Vale of Rheidol Railway was operated by the Cambrian Railways. The fleet consisted of two 2-6-2T locomotives, no. 1 Edward VII and no. 2 Prince of Wales, built by Davies and Metcalfe in 1902 (the only locomotives built new by Davies and Metcalfe); supplemented by a 2-4-0T, no. 3 Rheidol, built by W. G. Bagnall in 1896 and purchased secondhand in 1903.

When the Cambrian amalgamated with the GWR at the start of 1922, nos. 1 and 2 were renumbered 1212 and 1213 respectively; no. 3 became GWR no. 1198. Shortly after taking control of the line, the GWR realised that the original rolling stock was in a poor state of repair. They built three new locomotives (numbered 7, 8 and 1213) at the GWR's Swindon Works. No. 1198 was withdrawn in 1924, and no. 1212 in 1932. Number 1213 was later renumbered 9.

== Mistaken identity ==
There are references (in print and online) to the misconception that No. 9 is one of the original Davies & Metcalfe Locomotives, as some websites and books incorrectly report, having been misled by Swindon Works. Swindon listed the parts that made up the new No. 1213 as 'spares' in their accounting book as the GWR Board had only given them leave to build two new locomotives (No. 7 & No. 8).

No. 9 is the same age as No. 7 & No. 8, as shown when comparing the working drawings between it and a Davies and Metcalfe locomotive. Rheidol historian C C Green, who carried out this comparison, said of all three current locomotives that "mechanically they are identical", and when the current No. 9 (the 'new' 1213) is compared with the plans of the original 1213 stated that "no single part" of the original locomotive could possibly have fitted the new one.

In 1946, the GWR began a renumbering of the remaining locomotives inherited from pre-Grouping companies, but since it was only carried out as locomotives received heavy repairs, the process took several years. Under this scheme, the 'new' 1213 was renumbered No. 9 in March 1949.

== British Rail ownership ==
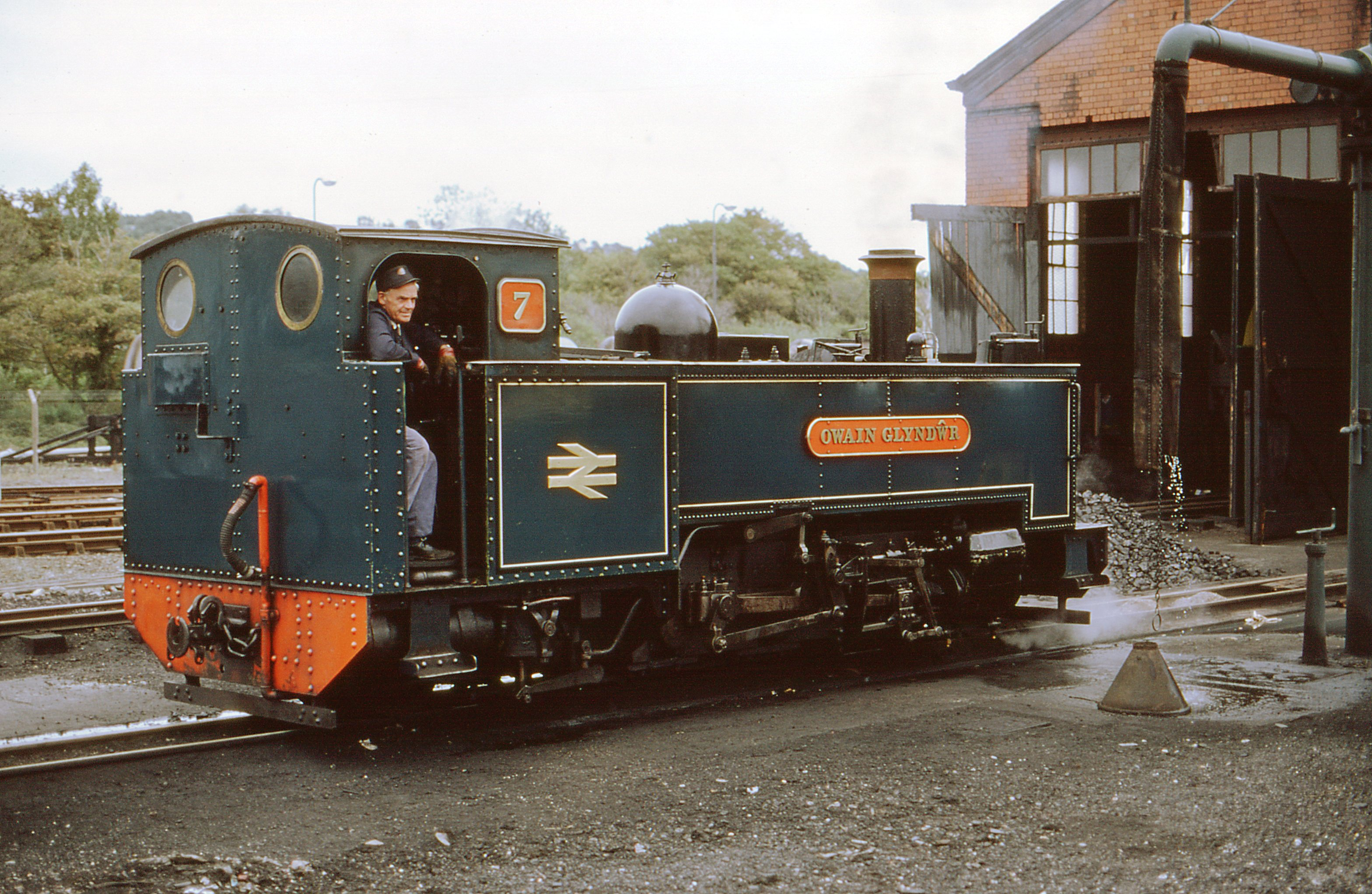
7 Owain Glyndwr in BR blue

Along with other ex-GWR locomotives, Nos. 7 and 8 retained their numbers under British Railways ownership, with No. 1213 also initially retaining its number until renumbered in 1949 under the 1946 plan. In June 1956 the three were given the names which they still carry today, being unnamed up to that point; No. 9 received the name Prince of Wales that its predecessor had borne until repainted into Cambrian Railways livery after that company absorbed the locomotive in July 1913. These three locos were the only steam engines to survive in BR's ownership after the end of main line steam traction in August 1968, excluding steam powered cranes which remained in service until 1995. Under the TOPS numbering arrangements introduced at this time they were allocated Class 98 and were nominally numbered 98007–98009, but these numbers were never actually carried on the locomotives. All three locomotives, and the rolling stock, carried standard British Rail 'rail blue' livery until the 1980s, when the locomotives were given more traditional liveries that they had carried in the past.

== Conversion to oil firing ==
The locomotives were originally designed to burn coal, however there was a period spanning over thirty years during which the three locomotives were oil fired. Problems with sparks and unreliability of the coal supplied caused British Railways to look to alternative fuels for the locomotives. Locomotive No. 7 was the first to be converted in 1978, followed by No. 8 in 1979 and No. 9 in 1981. This change was later reversed with Locomotive No. 8 returning to coal in 2012 and No. 9 in 2013.

== Preservation ==
All three Vale of Rheidol tanks are still in service and operating on their original route. They were named by British Railways in 1956.

| Image | Number | Name | Year built | Notes | In Traffic? |
|---|---|---|---|---|---|
| | 7 | Owain Glyndŵr | 1923 | Withdrawn from traffic in 1997 pending overhaul. Returned to service in October 2018. Carries British Railways Lined Green livery. | In Traffic |
| | 8 | Llywelyn | 1923 | Carries British Railways black livery with 'cycling lion' emblems | In Traffic |
| | 9 (1213) | Prince of Wales | 1924 | Numbered 1213 from delivery until gaining the No 9 in 1948. Put through Swindon works as an overhaul of the original No 2, but is in fact a complete new locomotive. Carries British Rail Lined Blue livery. | In Traffic |

== See also ==
- List of Vale of Rheidol Railway rolling stock

== Bibliography ==
- Boyd, James I.C. (1965). Narrow Gauge Railways in Mid Wales. Oakwood Press. ISBN 0-85361-024-X.
- Davies, F.K.; Firth, J.M.; Lucking, J.H.; Thomas, R.E.; Allcock, N.J.; Sterndale, A.C.; Barrie, D.S.M.; Reed, P.J.T.; Mountford, E.R. (April 1966). White, D.E. (ed.). The Locomotives of the Great Western Railway, part ten: Absorbed Engines, 1922-1947. RCTS. ISBN 0-901115-20-7.
- Green, CC (1986). The Vale of Rheidol Light Railway. Wild Swan. ISBN 0-906867-43-6.
- Johnson, Peter (1999). Welsh Narrow Gauge: a view from the past. Ian Allan Publishing. ISBN 0-7110-2654-8.
- Johnson, Peter (2011). An Illustrated History of the Great Western Narrow Gauge. OPC. ISBN 978-0-86093-636-7.
- Johnson, Peter (2020). The Vale of Rheidol Railway: The Story of a Narrow Gauge Survivor. Pen and Sword. ISBN 978-1-52671-805-1.
