= Mount Edgecumbe (Southland) =

Mountain in New Zealand

Coordinates: 45.768531°S 166.879488°E

Highest point
- Elevation: 1,105 m (3,625 ft)
- Prominence: 100 m (330 ft)

Mount Edgecumbe is a mountain in the Fiordland National Park in the Southland Region of New Zealand. It is situated on the southern side of Cook Channel, an arm of Dusky Sound, and is the westernmost of a small mountain range containing several higher but unnamed peaks. There is a small unnamed lake at around 800 metres on the southeastern flank of the mountain.

Mount Egecumbe, or Putauaki by its Māori name, is the prominent volcano immediately southeast of Kawerau. It has two craters at its summit, but the northwest one is occupied by a cold, circular lake at around 100 metres in diameter. The other crater has very steep walls and dense native forest, and north of this dry crater was a large cave entrance described by John Turner in 1974. It was estimated that Mount Edgecumbe last erupted more than 5500 years ago.
