= Lodena Edgecumbe =

American dancer

- Lodena Edgecumbe, photographed by Harry A. Atwell in 1920s.
- Born: April 1906
- Died: 1978
- Other names: Lodena Edgecombe, Lodena Edgcumbe, Lodena Armbrust (after marriage)
- Occupation: dancer

Lodena Edgecumbe (April 1906 – 1978) was an American dancer and dance educator based in Vallejo, California.

== Early life ==
Lodena Francisca Edgecumbe was adopted by Alfred E. Edgecumbe and Sara F. Edgecumbe of Vallejo, California, after she was discovered on a ferry, a newborn infant survivor of the 1906 San Francisco earthquake or subsequent fires. Her birth parents were presumed dead but never identified. She attended St. Vincent's Convent school in Vallejo, with further dance training in San Francisco.

== Career ==
As a little girl, Edgecumbe danced at the Panama–Pacific International Exposition in San Francisco. She joined the Pavley-Oukrainsky dance troupe as a young woman, and toured with them in the United States, Mexico, and Europe. She danced in productions of the Chicago Opera Company and the Manhattan Opera Company. Later she danced on vaudeville.

When her children were young, Edgecumbe opened a dance studio in Vallejo in 1933, and taught generations of dance students there. She led a troupe of young women dancers, the Lodena Adorables, inspired by Isadora Duncan's Isadorables group. She also conducted the Dancing Masters of California, a continuing education program for dance educators, and served on the Cultural Affairs Committee of Vallejo.

== Personal life ==
Lodena Edgecumbe married Richard Armbrust. They had children, Richard and Lodena Joy. Lodena Edgecumbe Armbrust died in 1978. In 2006, to mark the centennial of her birth, the Vallejo Naval and Historical Museum had an exhibit about Edgecumbe's life and work.
