= Richard Edgecombe (born c. 1540) =

English politician

Richard Edgecombe (c. 1540 – after 1587), of Cotehele, Cornwall, was an English politician.

He was a member (MP) of the parliament of England for Totnes in 1563.
