= BR Standard Class 4 2-6-0 76084 =

BR Standard 4 2-6-0 76084
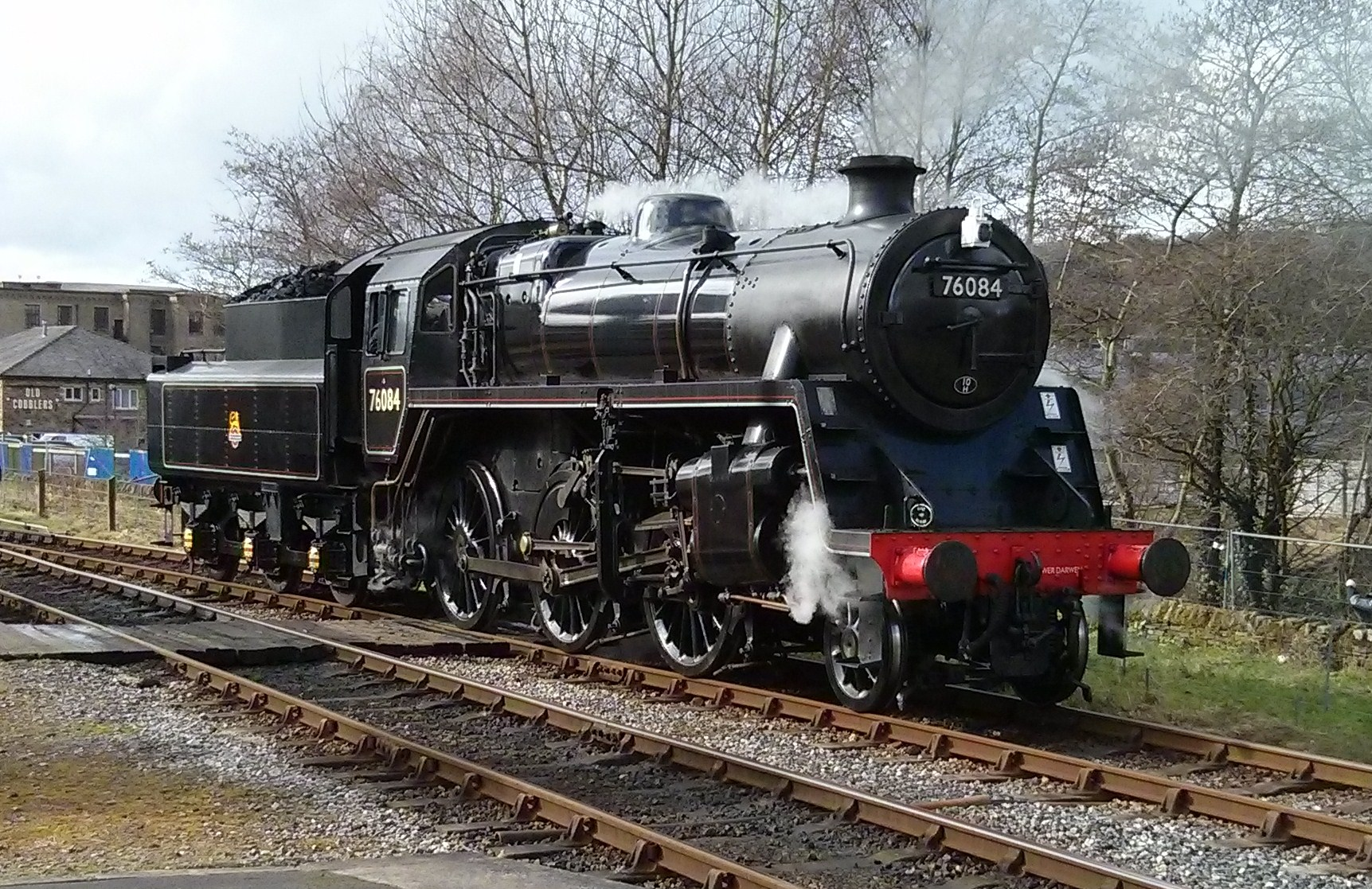
- 76084 visiting the East Lancs Railway in 2014.
Type and origin
- Power type: Steam
- Builder: Horwich Works
- Build date: 28 March 1957
Specifications
- Configuration
  - Whyte: 2-6-0
- Gauge: 4 ft 8 1/2 in (1,435 mm)
- Leading dia.: 3 ft 0 in (0.914 m)
- Driver dia.: 5 ft 3 in (1.600 m)
- Length: 60 ft 0 in (18.29 m)
- Width: 8 ft 9 1/2 in (2.68 m)
- Height: 13 ft 0 in (3.96 m)
- Loco weight: 59.75 long tons (60.71 t; 66.92 short tons)
- Tender weight: BR2A: 42.15 long tons (42.83 t; 47.21 short tons)
- Tender type: BR2A
- Fuel type: Coal
- Fuel capacity: BR2A: 6.00 long tons (6.10 t; 6.72 short tons)
- Water cap.: BR2A: 3,500 imp gal (16,000 L; 4,200 US gal)
- Boiler: BR7
- Boiler pressure: 225 psi (1.55 MPa)
- Train heating: Steam Heat
- Loco brake: Vacuum
Performance figures
- Tractive effort: 24,170 lbf (107.5 kN)
Career
- Operators: British Railways
- Class: BR standard class 4 2-6-0
- Numbers: 76084
- Withdrawn: December 1967
- Restored: May 2013
- Current owner: The 76084 Locomotive Company Limited
- Disposition: Under Overhaul

BR Standard Class 4 2-6-0 76084 is a BR Standard Class 4 2-6-0 locomotive built at Horwich in March 1957. Owned by The 76084 Locomotive Company Limited it is one of only four surviving members of its class in preservation.

== British Railways service ==
76084 was outshopped from Horwich Works on 28 March 1957.

Designed with a light axle-loading of only 16 tons, this meant that the BR Standard 4's route availability of RA4 was unrestricted and was able to work on all regions throughout Great Britain. Batches of the class were allocated to every region except the Western. Like most of the class, the BR2A tender was fitted. This had a narrower upper bunker, giving better visibility when running tender-first. Class members allocated to the Southern region had the more capacious full-width BR1B tender, as the extra tank capacity was needed with the absence of water troughs on the Southern.

From new 76084 was allocated to Lower Darwen in March 1957 alongside siblings 76080/1/2 and 3, further transfers were to follow during its career to Lancaster Green Ayre, Skipton and even Springs Branch.

76084 and its four siblings were transferred to Sutton Oak, St. Helens in March 1965 when Lower Darwen closed. All but 76082 were transferred to Springs Branch, Wigan in June 1967 when Sutton Oak too closed. Springs Branch was its final shed allocation where it remained until December 1967 when it was withdrawn from service. 76084 was taken to Barry Island in convoy with 76077 and 76079. The latter locomotive has been returned to service and is now at the North Yorkshire Moors Railway but 76077 is now undergoing restoration by Toddington Standard Locomotive Ltd for the Gloucestershire Warwickshire Steam Railway.

Location	Shedcode	Date
Lower Darwen	24D	28 Mar 1957
Lancaster Green Ayre	24J	4 Oct 1958
Skipton	24G	26 Oct 1958
Lancaster Green Ayre	24J	21 Feb 1959
Lower Darwen	24D	28 Mar 1959
Sutton Oak	8G	13 Mar 1965
Springs Branch	8F	24 Jun 1967
withdrawn		Week ending 2 Dec 1967

== Preservation ==
In October 1974 members of a preservation group from Sheffield spent a working weekend at Woodham Brothers scrapyard at Barry Island with a view to purchasing 76084 for preservation. They painted it in red primer to prevent further corrosion as it stood out in the yard. The preservation attempt failed and it remained at Barry Island for a further eight years, until 1982. Over the years, as space was becoming tight, 76084 was moved down the siding right towards the buffers and as time passed it was stripped of various parts as Woodhams became a valuable source of steam locomotive spares. In 1982 it was purchased by a preservationist for £7,500, and in January 1983 76084 left Woodhams for South Leverton. It had spent 14 years and four months in South Wales, and was the 143rd locomotive to leave the yard.

It was placed in its owner's back garden and was given a cosmetic makeover. In the 1990s its owner died and its future became uncertain. It was later purchased by what became the 76084 Locomotive Company and was moved to Morpeth where restoration was carried out. 76084 is now based on the North Norfolk Railway.

76084 returned to steam in May 2013 and returned to traffic in July 2013 after a 16 year restoration costing £750,000. Main line safety technologies - TPWS Mark IV, OTMR and GSM-R - were fitted and tested after raising a further £100,000 from shareholders and supporters. The engine worked its first charter train on 25 February 2017, the tour being the Railway Touring Company's Buxton Spa Express which it double headed with 45690 Leander.

It was withdrawn in December 2023 when its boiler certificate expired. As of February 2025, tenders for 76084's overhaul were being assessed. Due to lack of interest in 76084 from charter companies and restriction is main line use due to the locomotive being vacuum braked, it will not be re-certified for running on Network Rail metals. An agreement was signed between the North Norfolk Railway and 76084's owners in June 2026 for the locomotive to be overhauled at Weybourne Locomotive Works which is expected to cost £400,000 and take 2 years to complete. Following its overhaul 76084 will remain at the North Norfolk Railway.
