= Anthony Edgecomb =

American politician

Anthony J. Edgecomb

Member of the Maine House of Representatives for the 148th District
- In office 2014–2016
- Preceded by: Tyler Clark
- Succeeded by: David McCrea

Anthony J. "A.J." Edgecomb is an American politician from Maine who formerly represented Maine District 148 in the Maine House of Representatives. He resides in the city of Fort Fairfield. He is a Republican and was first elected to the House in 2014. He is the grandson of Maine politician Peter Edgecomb.

At 21 years old, he became the youngest member of Maine's House of Representatives for District 148.
