= Edgcumbe, Cornwall =

Hamlet in England

Coordinates: 50.154°N 5.191°W

Edgcumbe
- Location within Cornwall
- OS grid reference: SW721332
- Civil parish: Wendron
- Unitary authority: Cornwall
- Ceremonial county: Cornwall
- Region: South West
- Country: England
- Sovereign state: United Kingdom
- Post town: HELSTON
- Postcode district: TR13
- Dialling code: 01326
- Police: Devon and Cornwall
- Fire: Cornwall
- Ambulance: South Western
- UK Parliament: Camborne and Redruth

Edgcumbe is a hamlet 3 miles (4.8 km) west of Penryn in Cornwall, England. Edgcumbe is situated on the A394 road from Helston to Penryn and is in the parish of Wendron (where the 2011 census population was included ). Adjacent to Edgcumbe is the Little Trevease Solar Park which covers 25 acres (10 hectares) and has been operational since 2013; it is capable of generating 2.4MW of electricity.
