= GWR 4073 Class 5043 Earl of Mount Edgcumbe =

Preserved British steam locomotive

GWR 5043 Earl of Mount Edgcumbe
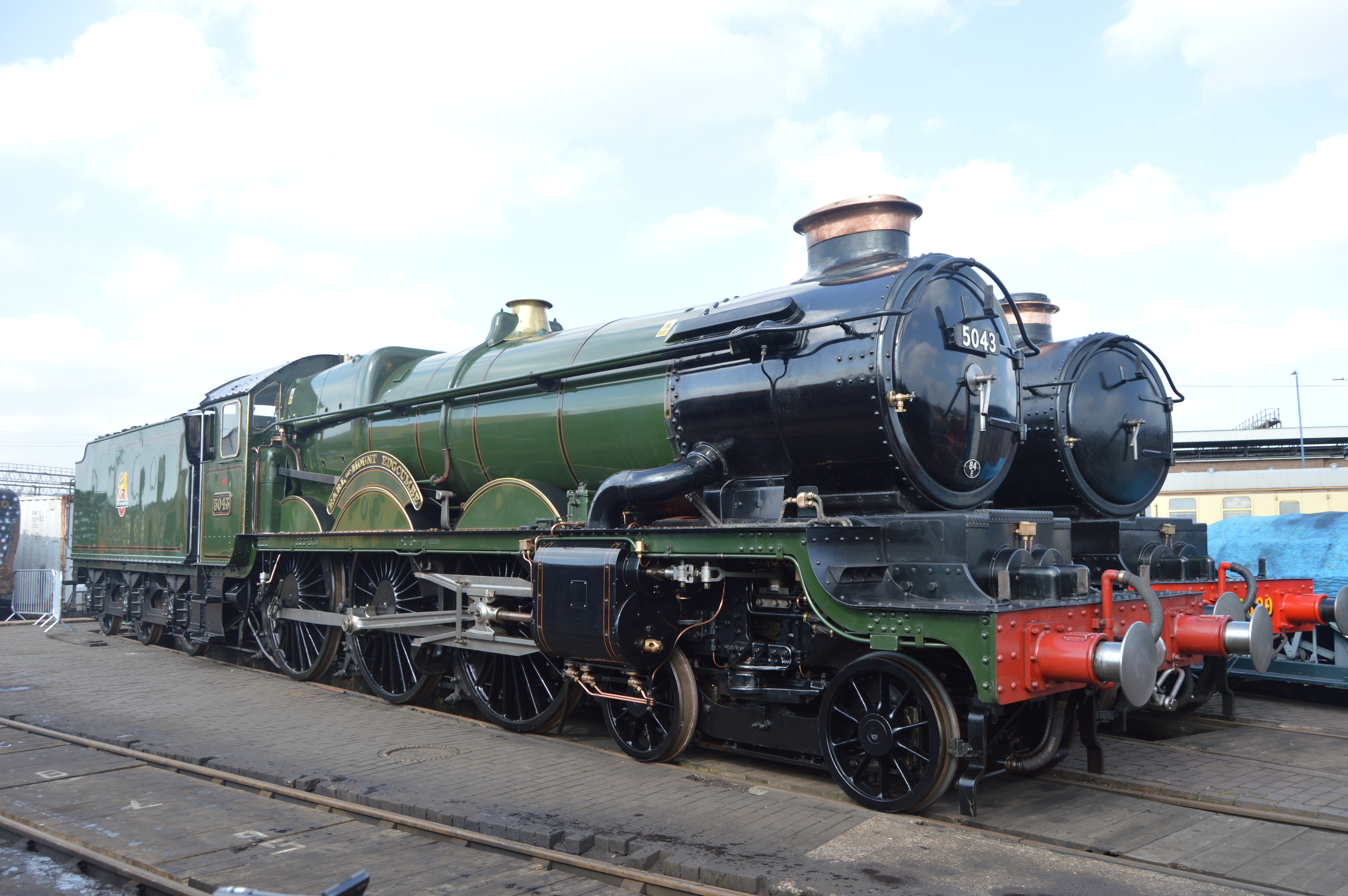
- 5043 parked up on a turntable road at Tyseley LW next to sister 5080 Defiant in April 2018.
Type and origin
- Power type: Steam
- Designer: Charles Collett
- Builder: GWR Swindon Works
- Build date: March 1936
Specifications
- Configuration
  - Whyte: 4-6-0
- Gauge: 4 ft 8 1/2 in (1,435 mm)
- Leading dia.: 3 ft 2 in (0.965 m)
- Driver dia.: 6 ft 8 1/2 in (2.045 m)
- Length: 65 ft 2 in (19.86 m) over buffers
- Width: 8 ft 11 in (2.718 m)
- Height: 13 ft 1 in (3.988 m) (Cut back from 13 ft 4 1/2 in (4.077 m))
- Loco weight: 79 long tons 17 cwt (178,900 lb or 81.1 t); 89.4 short tons full
- Tender weight: 47 long tons 6 cwt (106,000 lb or 48.1 t); 53.0 short tons full
- Fuel type: Coal
- Fuel capacity: 6 long tons 0 cwt (13,400 lb or 6.1 t); 6 long tons 0 hundredweight (6.10 t; 6.72 short tons)
- Water cap.: 4,000 imp gal (18,000 L; 4,800 US gal)
- Firebox
  - Grate area: 29.36 sq ft (2.728 m^{2})
- Boiler: GWR Standard Number 8
- Boiler pressure: 225 lbf/in^{2} (1.55 MPa)
- Heating surface
  - Firebox: 162.7 sq ft (15.12 m^{2}) (Collett); 163.5 sq ft (15.19 m^{2}) (Hawksworth)
  - Tubes: 1,857.7 sq ft (172.59 m^{2}) (Collett); 1,799.5 sq ft (167.18 m^{2}) (Hawksworth)
- Cylinders: Four (two inside, two outside)
- Cylinder size: 16 in × 26 in (406 mm × 660 mm)
- Valve gear: Inside cylinders: Walschaerts; Outside cylinders: derived from inside cylinders via rocking bars.
- Valve type: Piston valves
- Loco brake: Vacuum
Performance figures
- Tractive effort: 31,625 lbf (140.68 kN)
Career
- Operators: Great Western Railway; British Railways
- Power class: GWR: D BR: 7P
- Axle load class: GWR: Red
- Withdrawn: September 1963
- Current owner: Tyseley Locomotive Works
- Disposition: Operational, Mainline Certified

The GWR 4073 Class 5043 Earl of Mount Edgcumbe is a steam locomotive of the GWR 'Castle' Class, built in March 1936. It was originally named Barbury Castle, and was renamed Earl of Mount Edgcumbe in September 1937 (the name coming from the GWR Dukedog Class no 3200/9000). It had a double chimney and 4 row superheater fitted in October 1958.

Its first shed allocation was Old Oak Common; from June 1952 to February 1956 it was based at Carmarthen, before returning again to Old Oak Common. Like all other steam locomotives based there, with the dieselisation of Cardiff Canton TMD it was transferred to Cardiff East Dock shed in September 1962, its last shed allocation.

It was withdrawn in December 1963, and acquired by Woodham Brothers scrapyard in Barry, South Wales in June 1964.

== Renaming and Double Chimney ==
When built in March 1936 the engine was named Barbury Castle and it carried this name for the first eighteen months of its working life before being renamed by the GWR to Earl of Mount Edgcumbe in September 1937, this name it would carry for the rest of its working career. Its original Barbury Castle name would later be used by 5095 which was built in 1939.

In 1958 it became one of sixty-five engines to be fitted with a double chimney which was undertaken between 1956 and 1961. It is one of only two Castles in preservation to be fitted with a double chimney, the other engine being 7029 Clun Castle.

== Allocations ==
The shed locations of 5043 during her career with the GWR & BR on particular dates.

Shed allocations
Location	Shed code	From
Old Oak Common	PDN	13 March 1936
Swindon	SDN	December 1941
Old Oak Common	PDN	4 April 1942
(Stored) - Old Oak Common	PDN	17 February 1951
Carmarthen	87G	14 June 1952
Landore	87E	21 February 1953
Carmarthen	87G	13 June 1953
Landore	87E	26 March 1955
Carmarthen	87G	23 April 1955
Old Oak Common	81A	25 February 1956
Cardiff Canton	88A	21 April 1962
Cardiff East Dock	88L	8 September 1962

== Preservation ==
It was sold to the then Birmingham Railway Museum and left as the 43rd departure from Barry in September 1973. Many of its parts were removed for safekeeping and the locomotive was stored, initially as a spare boiler for 7029 "Clun Castle". In 1996, Birmingham Railway Museum trustees announced the project to restore Earl of Mount Edgcumbe to main line running condition. The proposal was to restore the locomotive to late 1950s condition, with newly constructed Hawksworth tender and BR double chimney.

In 1998, the boiler was removed from the frames and prepared for inspection, with welding undertaken by Babock. In 1999, descaling commenced on the front end of the frames in preparation for repair. The axleboxes were removed and examined, and found to be in excellent condition, requiring only examination, repair and cleaning. In 2000, 5043 was moved into Tyseley Locomotive Works. The engineering team scraped down the frames, which once clean showed them to be in good condition, and given a coat of anti-corrosive green paint. The bushes for the coupling rods were cast, machined and fitted. While checking the inside crossheads for repair and refitting, these were found to have been fitted at one time to sister GWR Castle 5080 Defiant. The wheelsets were prepared for cleaning and refitting, and the bogie repaired and repainted, with fitting undertaken in 2003. TPWS equipment was acquired and fitted. In late 2007 the boiler was steamed up and approved, allowing 5043 to move under its own steam on 3 October 2008.

On Saturday 16 October 2010, 5043 hauled a southbound excursion over the Settle-Carlisle line. On the climb to Ais Gill summit, 5043 is credited with generating an estimated 2030 edhp. As of Jan 2019 this is believed to be a power output record for the entire GWR Castle class, and also exceeds the maximum power outputs of the Western Region diesel-hydraulic locomotives built to replace them.

On Saturday 10 May 2014, 5043 took an anniversary train from Tyseley to Plymouth to mark 50 years since the original 748 train in 1964. Fellow resident 7029 Clun Castle worked the original train in 1964, working the Plymouth to Bristol section of the tour. And on that tour in 1964 she set a record of travelling non stop from Plymouth to Bristol in 133 minutes, 5043 working the anniversary train in 2014 broke that record by just two minutes.

On Saturday 4 March 2023, for the engine's inaugural railtour following completion of its 10 yearly overhaul at Tyseley. 5043 double headed a private Vintage Trains Shareholder special from Birmingham Moor Street to Didcot Parkway with classmate and fellow Tyseley resident 7029 Clun Castle. This tour was also the first time in preservation that the two surviving double chimney castles had double headed together. Following arrival at Didcot both engines were taken to Didcot Railway Centre and put on display alongside classmates 4079 Pendennis Castle and 5051 Drysllwyn Castle.

The locomotive has since returned to the mainline working various special trains, as part of Vintage Trains, alongside visiting Stratford upon Avon, Didcot, Cardiff and other locations over the former GWR network she has also visited locations and worked down routes she would never have visited or run along during her career with the Great Western Railway or even British Railways as GWR engines were known to be much wider than engines on other regions. New locations she has visited so far in preservation include: Liverpool, Llandudno, Chester, Carlisle, Salisbury, London Marylebone, Glasgow, Edinburgh and York.

== Preservation Photos ==
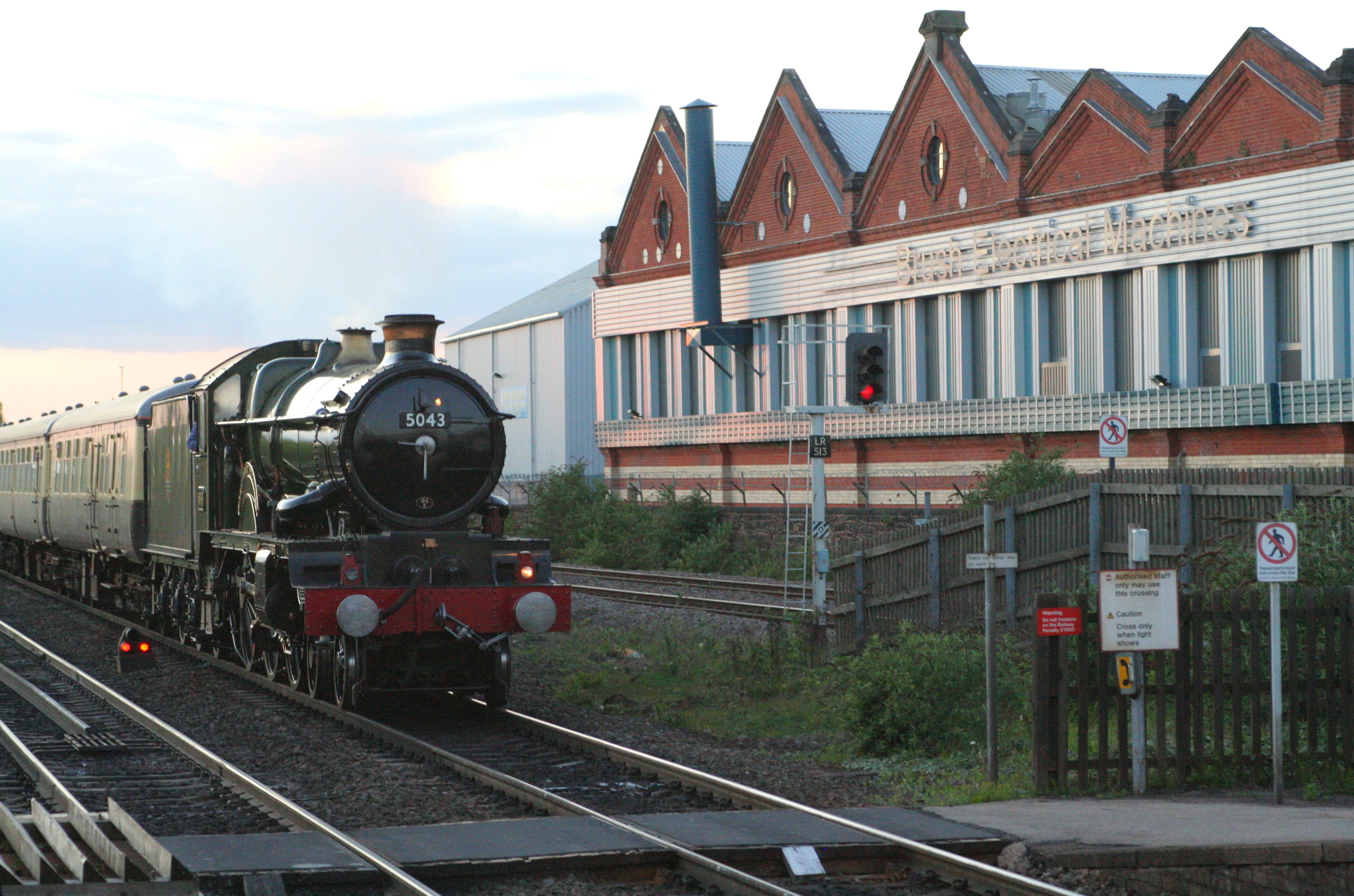
5043 in fading light passing Brush Works just before Loughborough Midland with the return leg of "The City of York" railtour on Sat 25 Apr 2009.

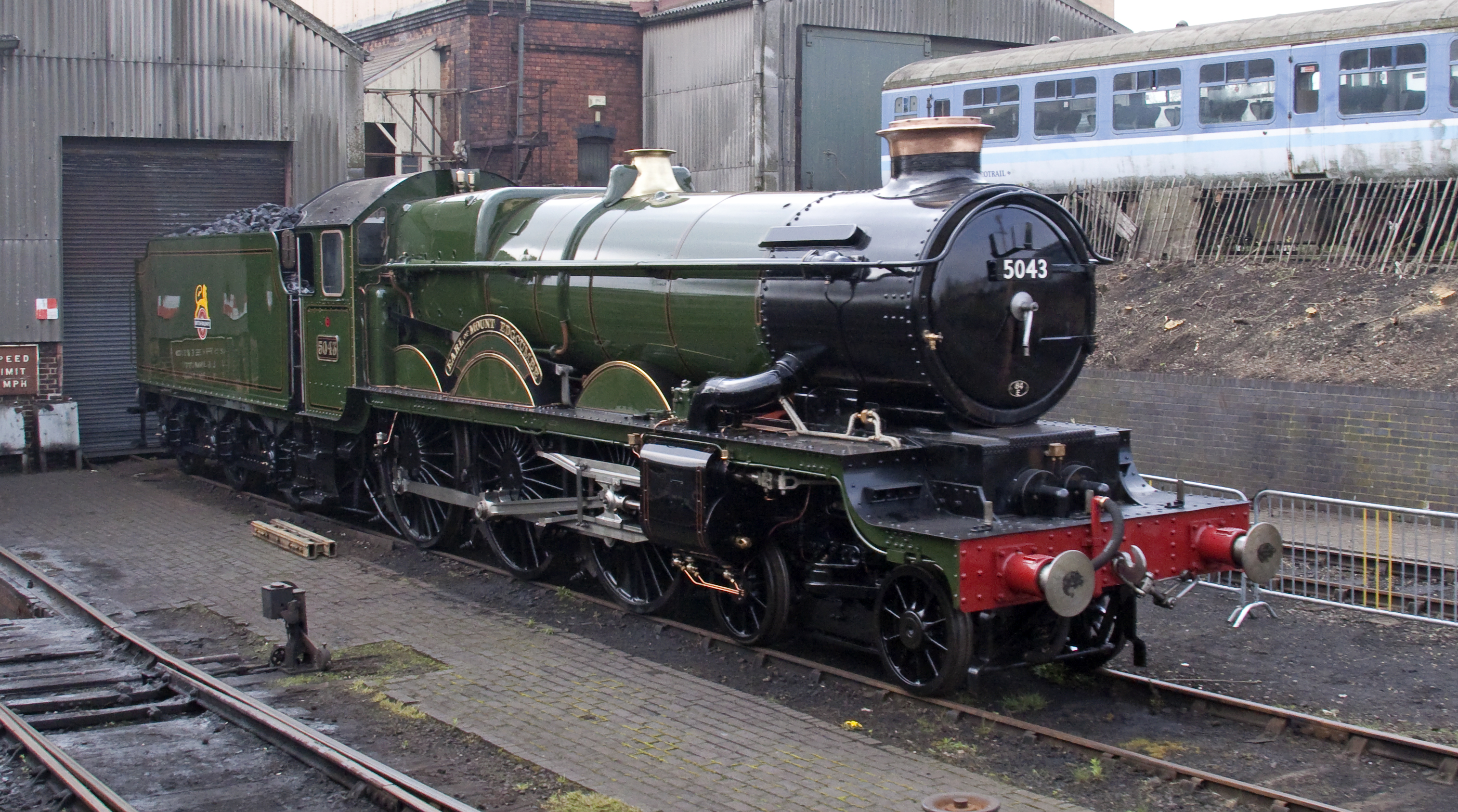
5043 On shed at Tyseley Locomotive Works in April 2009.

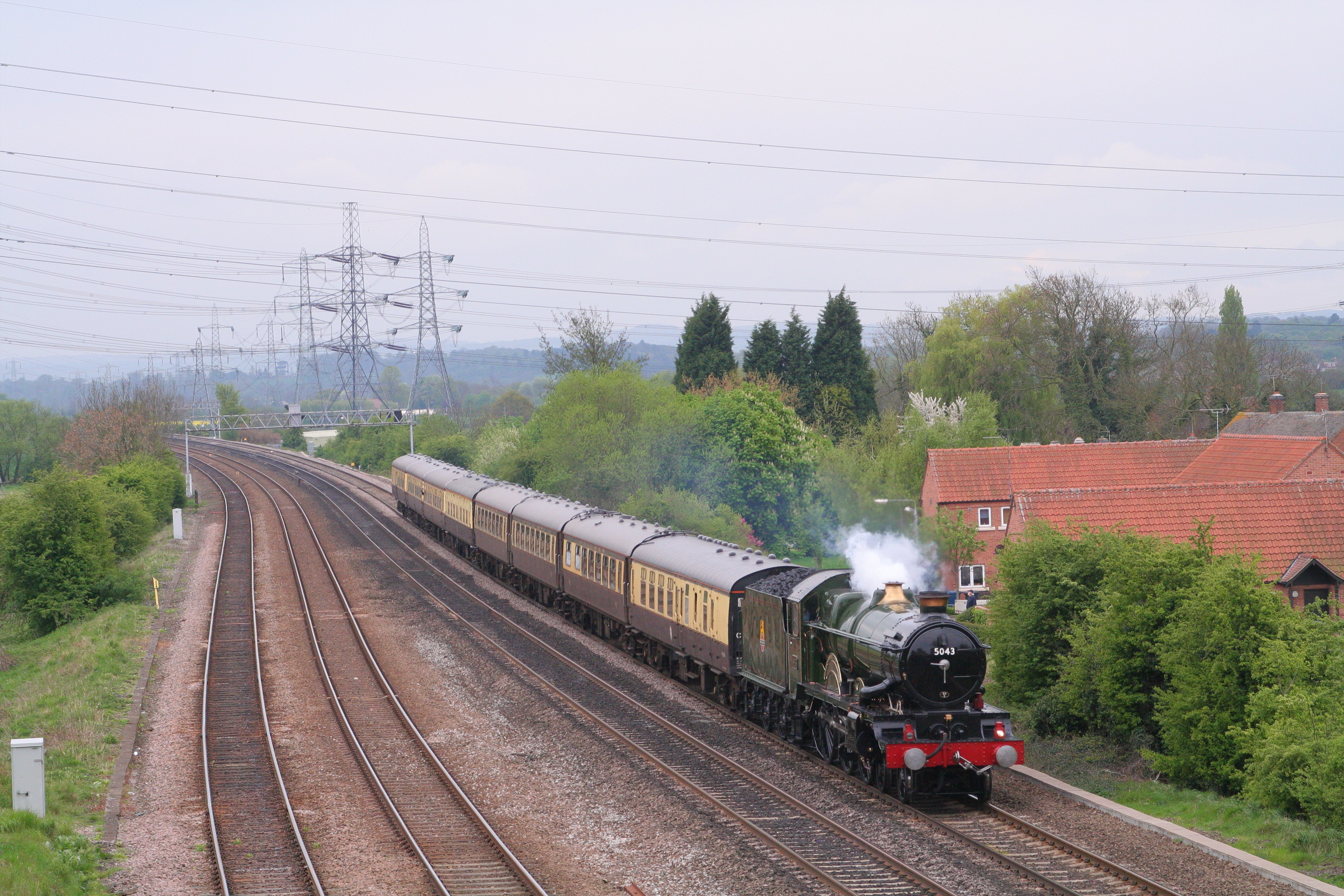
5043 with The City of York Tyseley-York charter on Sat 25 Apr 2009.

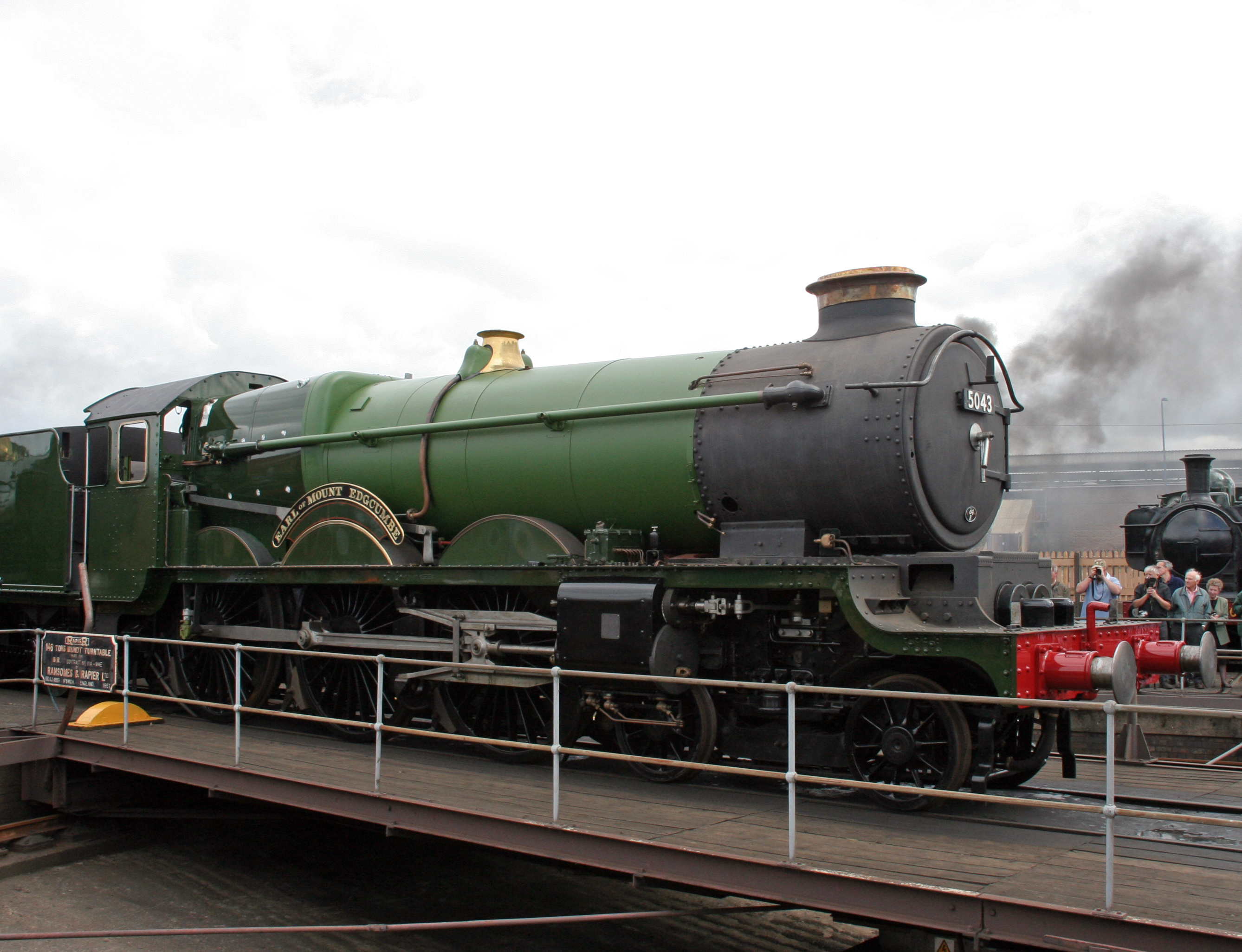
5043 unlined and minus cabside numbers at Tyseley Locomotive Works.

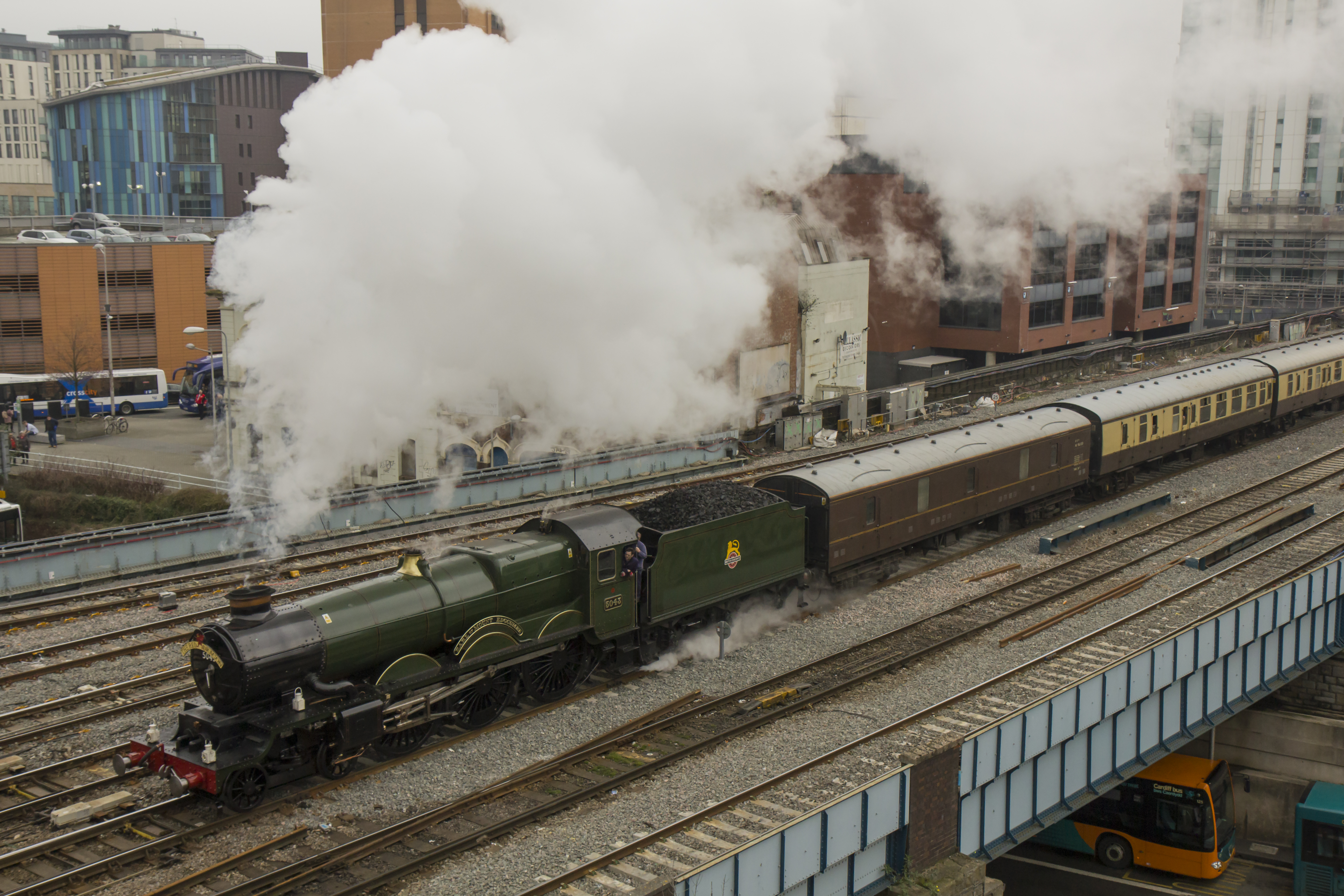
5043 arriving at Cardiff Central with Vintage Trains' 'Red Dragon' tour from Tyseley, Birmingham on Sat 11 Mar 2017.

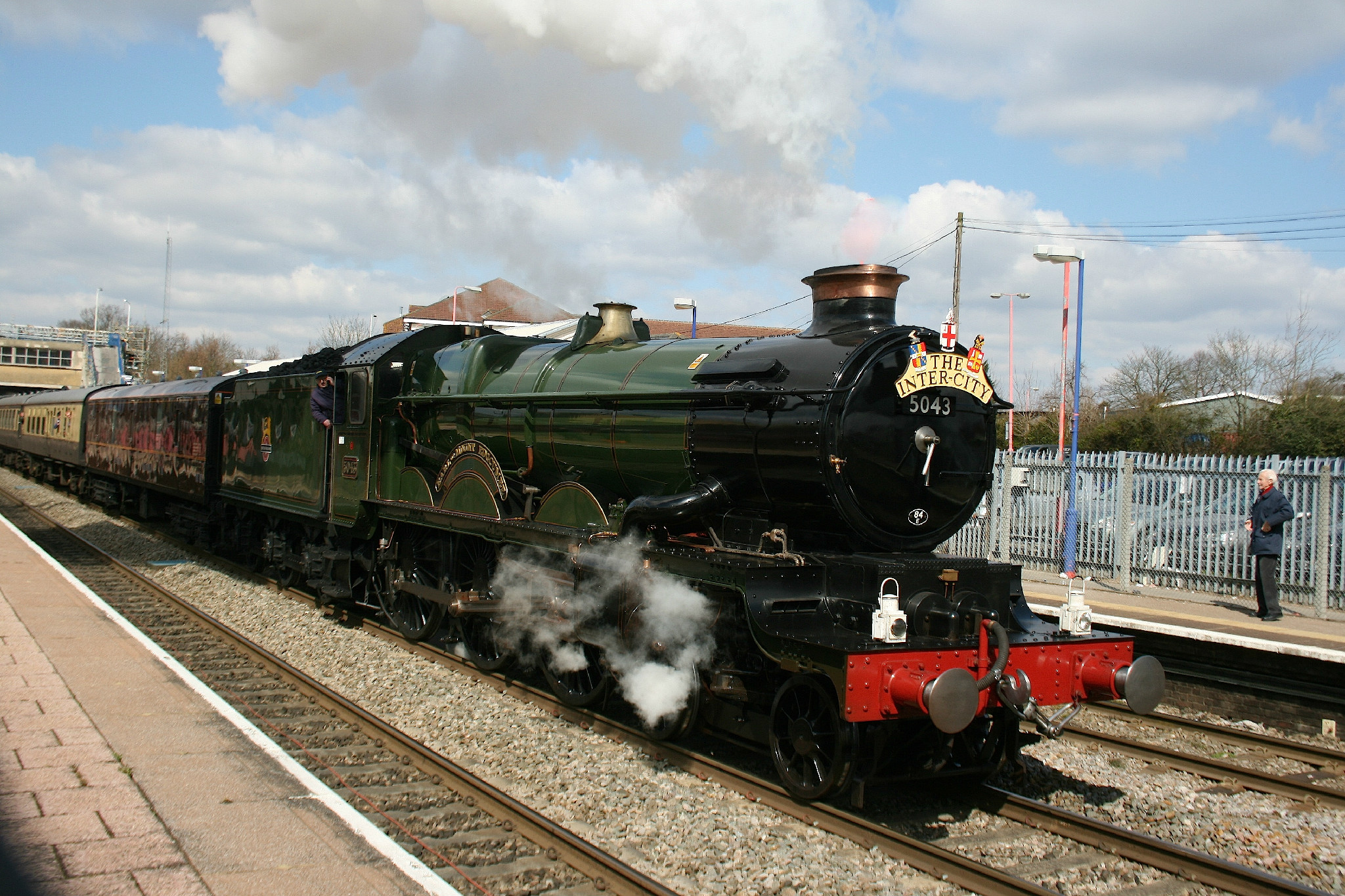
5043 at West Ruislip in Apr 2011 with The Marylebone Flyer.

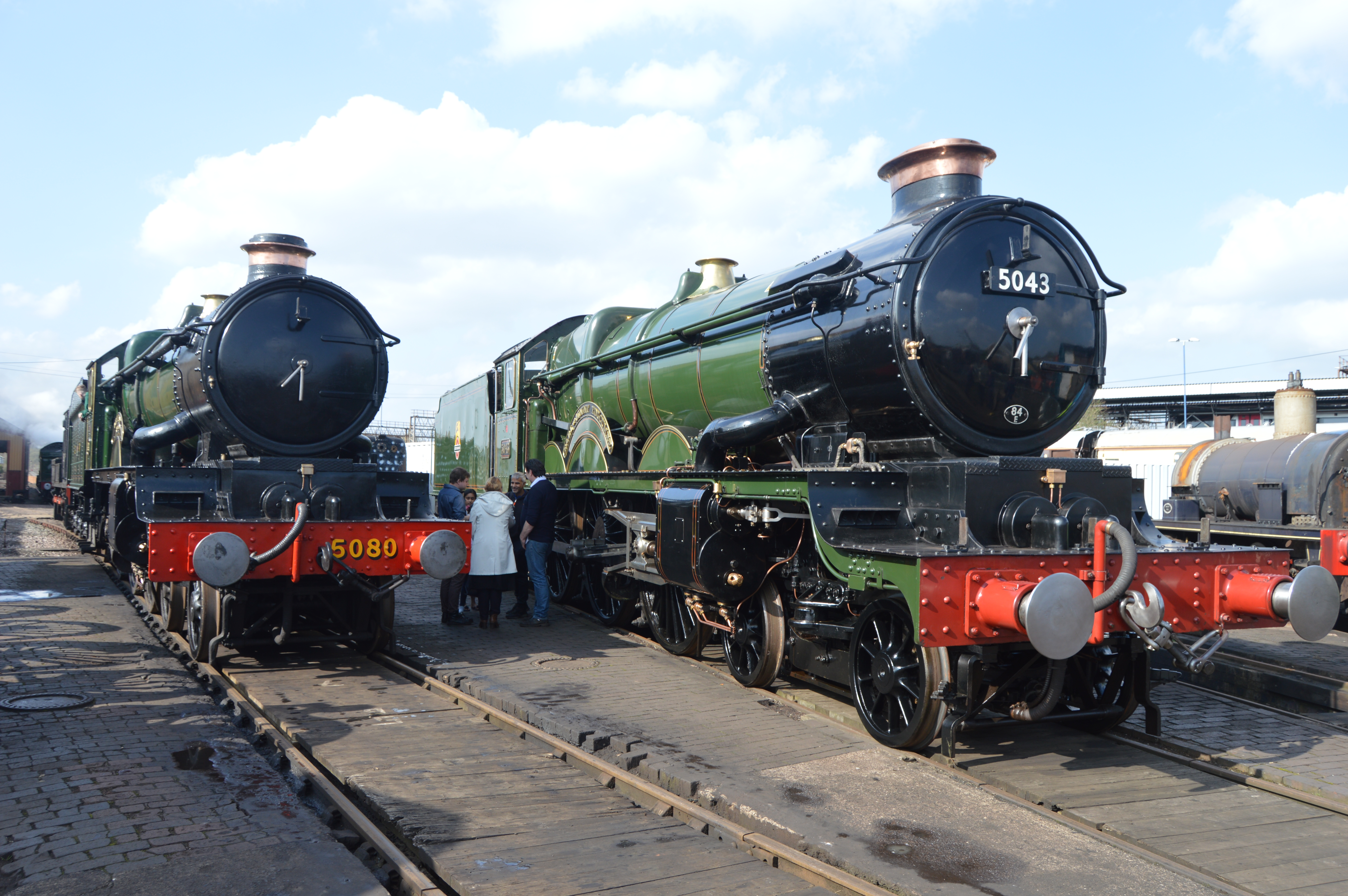
5080 Defiant and 5043 parked up side by side around the Turntable at Tyseley Loco Works in April 2018.

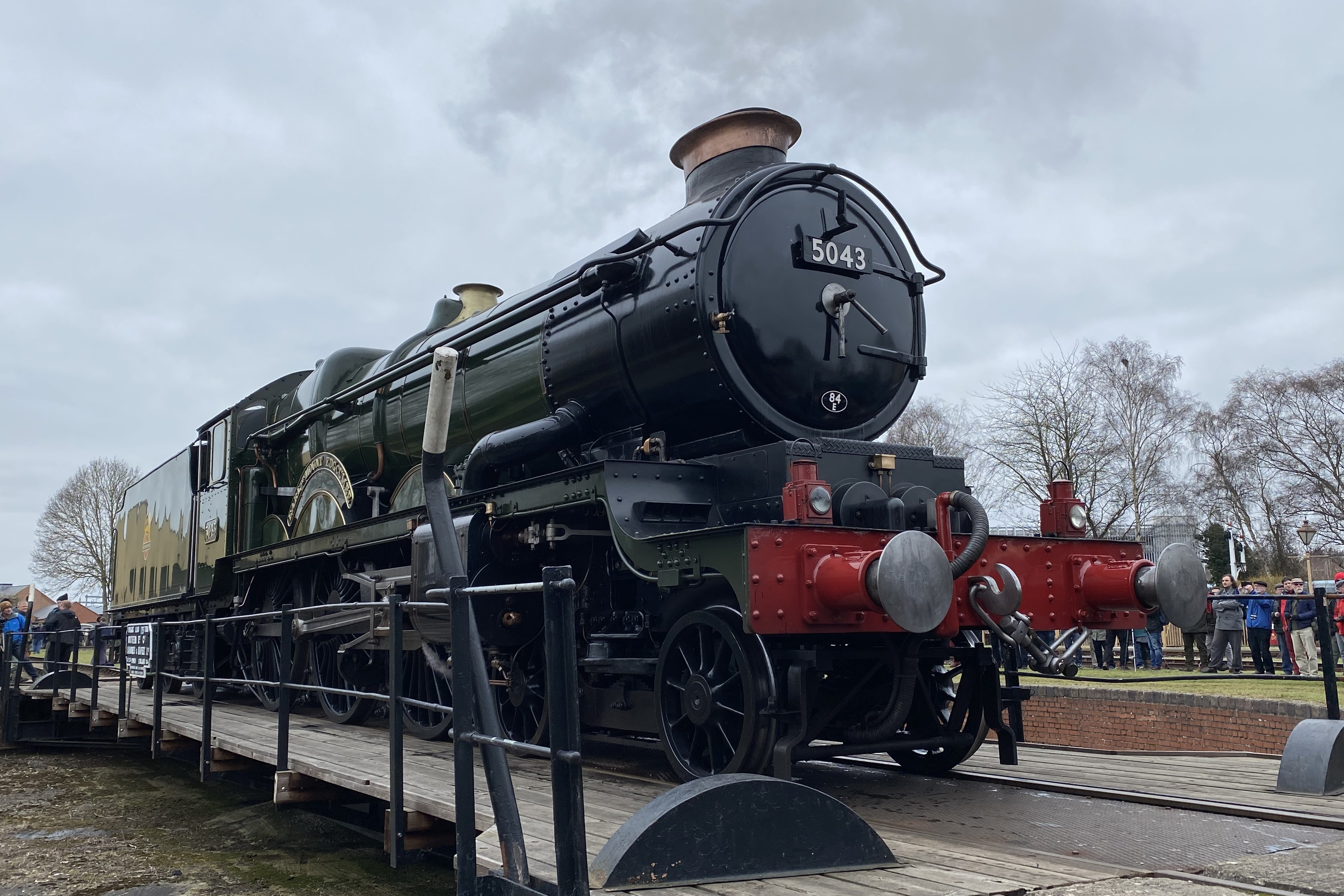
5043 on the turntable at the Didcot Railway Centre, 4 March 2023
