= List of Vale of Rheidol Railway rolling stock =

This is a list of past and present rolling stock used on the Vale of Rheidol Railway (Welsh: Rheilffordd Cwm Rheidol), a 1 ft 11 3/4 in (603 mm) narrow gauge heritage railway, opened in 1902, that runs for 11 3/4 miles (19 km) between Aberystwyth and Devil's Bridge in the county of Ceredigion, Wales.

The railway was later operated by the Cambrian Railways, Great Western Railway and British Rail before being privatised in 1989 and run as a heritage railway operation (though arguably it had operated as a tourist railway operation since the mid-1930s, when the GWR withdrew freight services and winter passenger services, rendering the railway wholly reliant on the tourist trade).

When first opened, the railway owned two steam locomotives, No 1 Edward VII and No 2 Prince of Wales, along with a third contractor's locomotive No 3 Rheidol. In 1922 the Great Western Railway took over the running of the line and over the next two decades invested heavily in new locomotives and replacement rolling stock.

== Locomotives ==
=== Steam locomotives ===
The railway has four steam locomotives for use on passenger trains, three of which were built for the Vale of Rheidol line and have operated on the line ever since.

A Garratt locomotive arrived in 2017 for use on passenger trains and is not prototypical for the line historically.

Image	Number	Name	Builder	Wheel arr.	Year built	Notes	In traffic?
	7	Owain Glyndŵr	Great Western Railway	2-6-2T	1923	Hauled the last steam service under British Rail ownership of the line. Withdrawn from traffic in 1997 pending overhaul. Returned to service in October 2018. Carries British Railways Lined Green Livery.	In Traffic
	8	Llywelyn	Great Western Railway	2-6-2T	1923	Carries British Railways black livery with 'cycling lion' emblems and 'Llywelyn' nameplates.	In Traffic
	9 (1213)	Prince of Wales	Great Western Railway	2-6-2T	1924	Numbered 1213 from delivery until gaining the No 9 in 1948. Put through Swindon works as an overhaul of the original No 2, but is in fact a complete new locomotive. Carries British Rail Lined Blue Livery.	In Traffic
	60	Drakensberg	Hanomag	2-6-2+2-6-2	1927	NG G13 Garratt locomotive. Arrived at the railway from Schinznacher Baumschulbahn, Switzerland in 2017, and has since undergone overhaul, including the fitting of air brakes. Entered passenger service in 2022.	In Traffic

=== Diesel locomotives ===
The steam locomotive fleet is today supplemented by a number of diesel locomotives. Although they lack the power of the steam locomotives, they are available for shunting duties or works trains. No 10 can also operate light passenger trains.

Image	Number	Name	Works number	Builder	Wheel arr.	Year built	Notes	In traffic?
	10	-	BMR002	Baguley-Drewry / Brecon Mountain Railway	0-6-0DM	1987	Built out of parts from Baguley-Drewry engineering	In Traffic
	11	-	DM1366	Hudswell Clarke	0-6-0DM	1965	Built for National Coal Board. Rebuilt at Bredgar and Wormshill Railway in 2012 and named Wormshill. Acquired by Vale of Rheidol in 2021	In Traffic
	NG 52	-	721	Andrew Barclay	0-4-0DM	1987	Built for Ministry of Defence. Previously at Eastriggs.	In Traffic - Works Use Only
	RPM No. 9	-	3124	W. G. Bagnall	0-6-0DM	1957	Built for Rustenburg Platinum Mines, South Africa.	Under Overhaul

=== Self propelled engineering plant ===
The railway has a number of vehicles for permanent way maintenance.

Image	Works Number	Name	Builder	Wheel arr.	Year built	Notes	In Traffic?
	DX68804	Thunderbird 4	Permaquip	2w-2DMR	1985	This light vehicle conveys a team of staff in comfort along with all the tools and equipment required for maintenance work. The vehicle can also be rotated through 180 degrees by means of a hydraulic lift, allowing the P-Way team to turn it so that the cab is always at the front when in motion.	In Traffic
	UGT1	-	Plasser	4wDH	1986	Plasserail ballast tamper, built in South Africa and moved to the Vale of Rheidol Railway in 1991.	In Traffic
	7495	-	Hunslet / Aberystwyth Locomotive Works	4wDM	1977. Rebuilt 2007	Rail mounted self-propelled vehicle used to clear lineside vegetation. Designed by Llŷr ap Iolo and built from chassis components from ex MOD Hunslet 4w diesel locomotive No 7495, originally built 1977 2'6" gauge. The McConnel flail head has a purpose built turntable and has a reach of 15 feet and a maximum speed of 7.5 mph.	In Traffic

=== Former locomotives ===
Image	Number	Name	Builder	Wheel arr.	Year built	Notes
	1	Edward VII	Davies & Metcalfe	2-6-2T	1902	Re-numbered 1212 in 1922. Overhauled by the GWR in 1925 and gained traditional Swindon fittings. Saw very little use following the arrival of the 3 new locomotives. In 1932 1212 moved to Swindon works The official withdrawal date is given as 9 March 1935. It was scrapped shortly afterwards.
	2	Prince of Wales	Davies & Metcalfe	2-6-2T	1902	Renumbered 1213 in 1922. Sent to Swindon works in 1924 and scrapped. The number was immediately re-used for the new locomotive 1213 (now No 9) as part of the pretence of a heavy overhaul of the original locomotive.
	3	Rheidol	Bagnall	2-4-0T	1896	Renumbered 1198 by the GWR in 1923 but withdrawn and scrapped the following year, having never carried its GWR number.
		4131	Wickham Trolley		1947	Withdrawn in 1985 with the arrival of the Permaquip personnel carrier. Now at the Moseley Railway Trust, Apedale Railway. Also carried the numbers B146, B146W, PWM2214, TR26 and DX68061

==== No 1, & No 2 (later 1212 & 1213) ====
The VoR commenced operations with two 2-6-2T locomotives constructed by Davies & Metcalfe of Manchester, Nos.1 and 2. These locomotives were given Nos.1212 and 1213 by the GWR when it took over the line on grouping. They were Davies and Metcalfe's first locomotives and a Great Central Railway boilersmith, Thomas Kay, provided expertise in their construction. The contract was given to a company previously inexperienced in locomotive building (although previously they were involved in the repair of locomotives and made injectors) because Mr. Metcalfe was an Aberystwyth man. The design draws inspiration from the Manning Wardle 2-6-2Ts on the then-newly opened Lynton and Barnstaple Railway, to which they bear some resemblance. This may be because the Szlumper family was heavily involved in both railways' design and construction.

==== No 3 (later 1198) ====
No. 3 was a one-off small 2-4-0T locomotive, originally built by Bagnall of Stafford for a Brazilian sugar cane plantation in 1896 but never delivered as the order was cancelled, Bagnall regauging the locomotive from 750 mm (2 ft 5 1/2 in) to 2 ft 3 in (686 mm) when it was sold to the Plynlimon and Hafan Tramway and named Talybont. In 1903, after the failure of the Plynlimon and Hafan, it was purchased by the VoR, regauged to 1 ft 11 3/4 in (603 mm) and renamed Rheidol. The GWR numbered it 1198 in 1923, but it was withdrawn and scrapped the following year, having never carried its GWR number.

==== No 4 ====
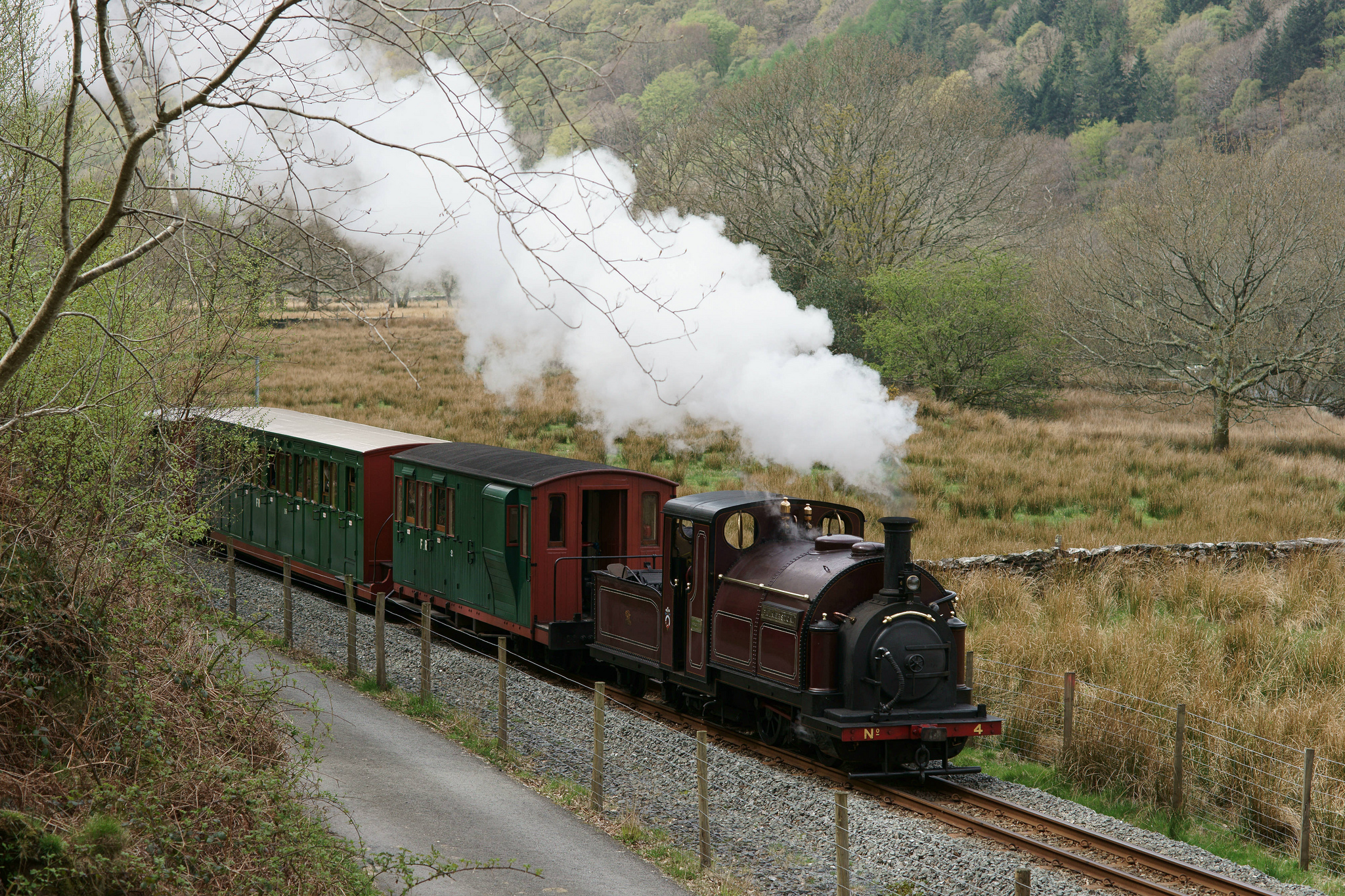
Ffestiniog Railway No 4 Palmerston

In 1902 the railway's Directors temporarily hired a locomotive from the Ffestiniog Railway. The locomotive sent was Ffestiniog No 4 Palmerston. The following year VoR locomotive No 3 Rheidol was acquired (see entry above), but a need for a fourth locomotive was still discerned. Palmerston No 4 was therefore hired again from Ffestiniog, and became the regular fourth locomotive for the next twenty years, being hired for several long periods, interspersed with brief home visits to Ffestiniog. The locomotive carried fleet number '4' in reference to its position on its home railway, although the number also matched its position on the Vale of Rheidol, as the fourth locomotive. When the line was acquired by the Great Western Railway, the leased locomotive was no longer required and was returned to Ffestiniog (from where it was immediately re-hired to the Welsh Highland Railway, to assist with construction). Palmerston (an 0-4-0ST) was built in 1864 by George England of New Cross, the fourth of the original four Ffestiniog Railway locomotives and was named after the Prime Minister, Viscount Palmerston. Palmerston returned to the Vale of Rheidol in 2014, hauling a series of special trains during September to celebrate its association with the VoR, and to commemorate both a century of history since the first world war, and 25 years of VoR independent operation.

== Coaching stock ==
=== Current coaching stock ===
The Vale of Rheidol Railway has a total of 16 carriages and 1 brake van. All were built by the Great Western Railway at Swindon to replace much older rolling stock built by the Midland Railway Carriage and Wagon Company for the opening of the line. Twelve bogie carriages were built for the opening.

All the stock is third class only, unless otherwise stated. All currently carry both their GWR numbers (on carriage sides) and also their VoR numbers (on the carriages ends).

Image	GWR No.	BR No. (1948)	BR No. (1987)	VoR No. (1989)	Year built	Builder	Type	Livery	Notes
	4143	M4143W	4143	1	1938	Swindon	Fully Enclosed Third	Chocolate and Cream with GWR Garter Crest	In Traffic
	4144	M4144W	4144	2	1938	Swindon	Fully Enclosed Third	British Railways Carmine and Cream	In Traffic
	4145	M4145W	4145	3	1938	Swindon	Fully Enclosed Third	Chocolate and Cream with GWR Garter Crest	In Traffic
	4146	M4146W	4146	4	1938	Swindon	Fully Enclosed Third	Chocolate and Cream with GWR Shirt Button	In Traffic
	4147	M4147W	4147	5	1938	Swindon	Fully Enclosed Third	Chocolate and Cream with GWR Garter Crest	In Traffic
	4148	M4148W	4148	6	1938	Swindon	Fully Enclosed Third	British Railways Carmine and Cream	In Traffic
	4149	M4149W	4149	7	1938	Swindon	Open Third "Summer Car"	Chocolate and Cream with GWR Garter Crest	In Traffic
	4150	M4150W	4150	8	1938	Swindon	Open Third "Summer Car"	British Railways Crimson and Cream	In Traffic
	4151	M4151W	4151	9	1938	Swindon	Open Third "Summer Car"	Chocolate and Cream with GWR Garter Crest	In Traffic
	4994	M4994W	4734	10	1938	Swindon	Fully Enclosed Third	British Railways Carmine and Cream	In Traffic
	4995	M4995W	4735	11	1938	Swindon	Brake / First Observation	Chocolate and Cream with GWR Garter Crest	In Traffic
	4996	M4996W	4736	12	1938	Swindon	Brake / First Observation	British Railways Carmine and Cream	In Traffic
	4997	M4997W	4737	13	1923	Swindon	Open Third "Summer Car"	British Railways Carmine and Cream	In Traffic
	4998	M4998W	4738	14	1923	Swindon	Open Third "Summer Car"	British Railways Carmine and Cream	In Traffic
	4999	M4999W	4739	15	1923	Swindon	Open Third "Summer Car" - Converted to "Vista Car" in 1985. Out of traffic since approx 1990. Returned to traffic in 2018 as a wheelchair accessible carriage.	Chocolate and Cream with GWR Garter Crest	In Traffic
	5000	M5000W	4740	16	1923	Swindon	Open Third "Summer Car"	Bodywork removed. Out of traffic since approx 1990.	Stored
	137			19	1938	Swindon	Four-wheeled full brake. Constructed new 1938	GWR Shirt Button	In Traffic

=== Former coaching stock ===
Image	GWR No.	VoR No.	Year built	Builder	Type	Notes
	135	17	1938	Swindon	Four-wheeled full brake	Constructed new in 1938. Scrapped in 1968.
	136	18	1938	Swindon	Four-wheeled full brake	Constructed new in 1938. Sold to the Welsh Highland Heritage Railway in 1968.

== Wagon Fleet ==
The railway has a number of wagons used for freight / engineering work.

Image	Number	Historic Number	Type	Origin	Notes
	20	34104	4 Wheel - Side Door	Midland Railway Carriage & Wagon Co	
	21	34108	4 Wheel - Side Door	Midland Railway Carriage & Wagon Co	
	22	34110	4 Wheel - Side Door	Midland Railway Carriage & Wagon Co	
	23	34111	4 Wheel - Side Door	Midland Railway Carriage & Wagon Co	
	24	8512	4 Wheel Flat - ex Side Door	Midland Railway Carriage & Wagon Co	
	25	8510	4 Wheel Flat - ex End Door	Ex Plynlimon and Hafan Tramway	
	26	34106	4 Wheel Flat - ex End Door	Ex Plynlimon and Hafan Tramway	
	27	8513	4 Wheel Flat - ex End Door	Ex Plynlimon and Hafan Tramway	
	28	34124	4 Wheel End Door	Ex Plynlimon and Hafan Tramway	
	29	34136	4 Wheel End Door	Ex Plynlimon and Hafan Tramway	
	30	34141	4 Wheel End Door	Ex Plynlimon and Hafan Tramway	
	31		Rail carrying Bolsters	Ex Bowaters Paper Mill	
	33		Bogie Ballast Hopper	Ex South African Railways	SAR Type Y
	34		Bogie Flat	Ex South African Railways	Converted from SAR Type B
	35		Bogie Open Side Door	Ex South African Railways	SAR Type B
	36	SAR No 2888	Bogie Open Dropside	Ex South African Railways	DZ-9
	37	SAR No 2762	Bogie Open Dropside	Ex South African Railways	DZ-10
	38	SAR No 1914	Bogie Open Dropside	Ex South African Railways.	DZ Type.
	39	SAR No 3176	Bogie Brake Van	Ex South African Railways.	NG V-16 Type
	40	38089	Cattle Wagon	Great Western Railway.	Built Swindon (Lot No. 914) Moved to Welshpool & Llanfair 1937. To Ffestiniog in 1960. Returned to Vale of Rheidol in 2014 and re-entered traffic in 2017.

== Museum collection ==
The Vale of Rheidol Railway owns an extensive collection of historic narrow gauge locomotives and rolling stock. Many items were collected by former chairman Peter Rampton and kept out of public view for decades at a farm in Surrey and gained the nickname "Collection X". Many have moved to the Vale of Rheidol, some are stored pending restoration whilst others are on display in the Engine Shed museum at Aberystwyth station.

=== Museum collection locomotives ===
Only some these locomotives are available for public viewing.

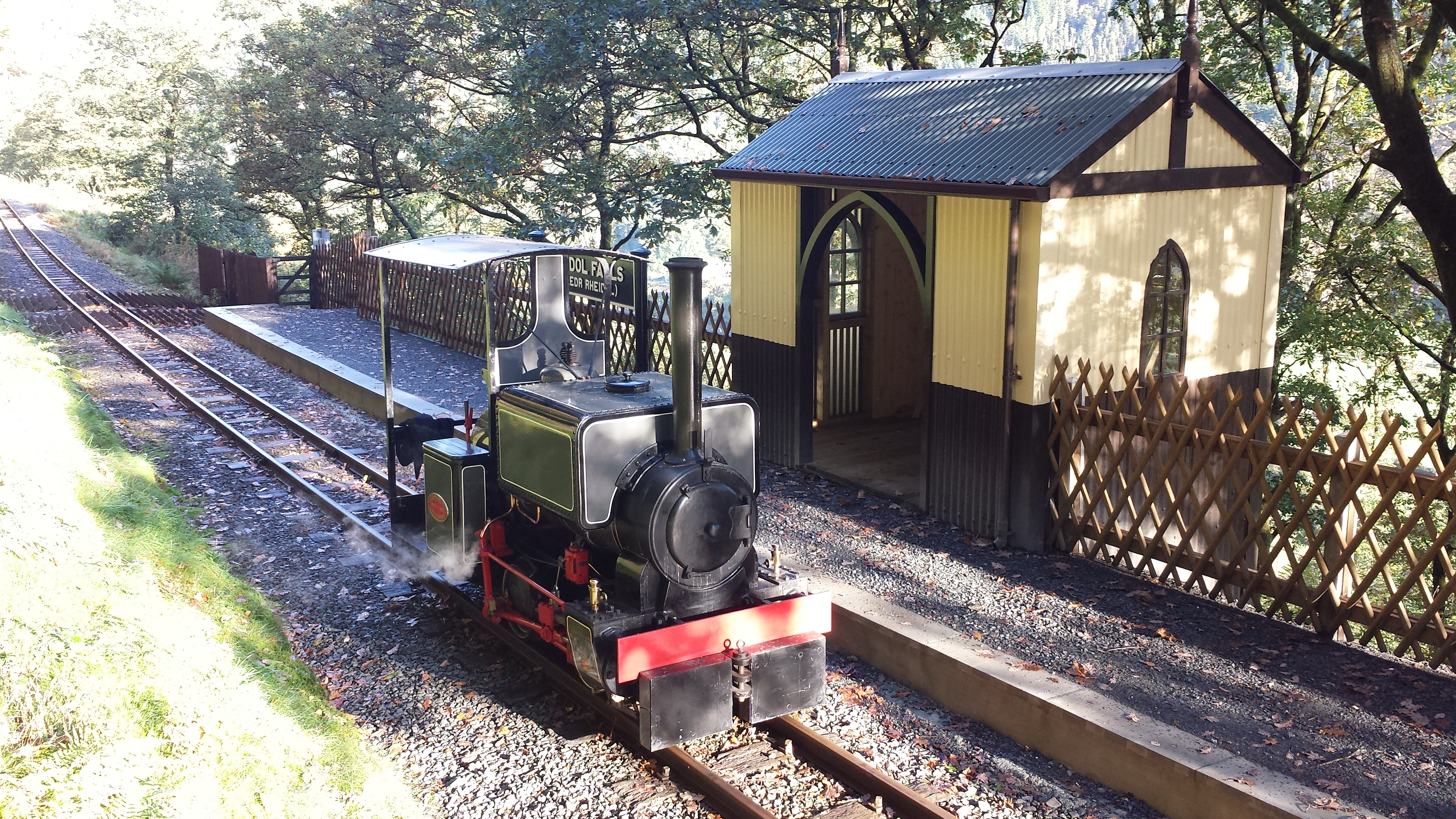
Wren 3114 seen at Rheidol Falls halt.

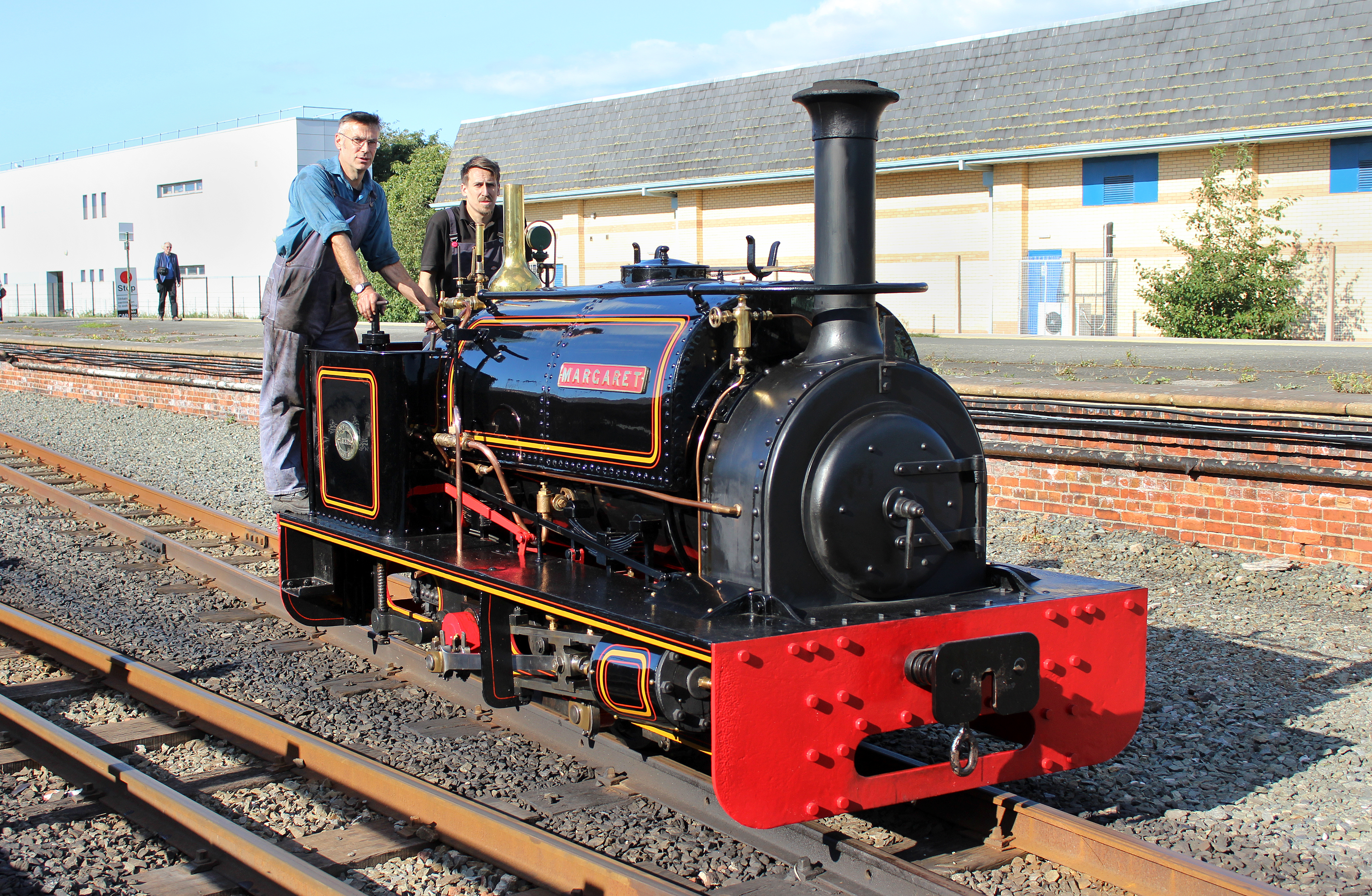
Margaret was restored in the Vale of Rheidol workshops

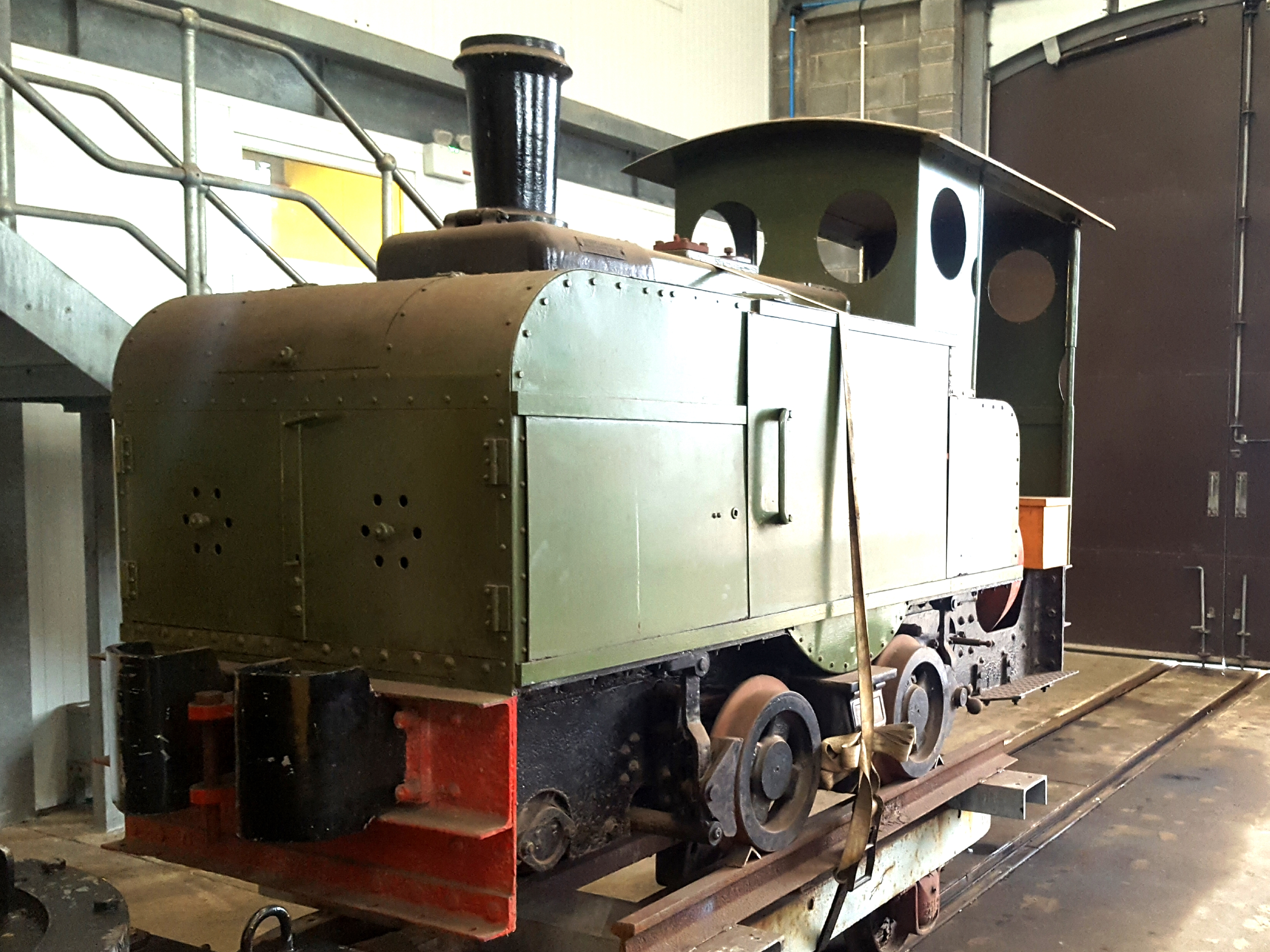
Ruston Proctor ZLH Paraffin Mechanical Locomotive in the workshop in Aberystwyth.

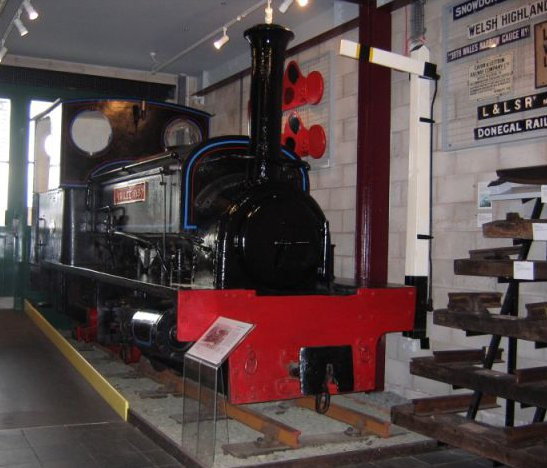
Jubilee 1897 on display in the Narrow Gauge Railway Museum, Tywyn.

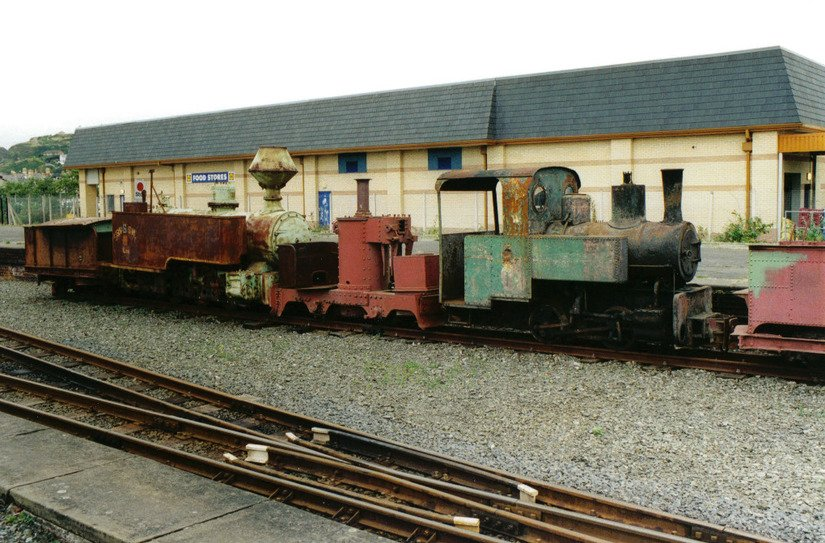
Decauville Progress 5t, De Winton and Fowler locomotives at Vale of Rheidol Railway

=== Steam Locomotives ===
Builder	Works number	Name	Year built	Wheel arr	Gauge	Number	Type	Notes
A Borsig	5913		1906	0-4-0WT	1 ft 11 5/8 in (600 mm)	3		Built for a brickworks in Belgium
A Borsig	6022	Sotillos	1906	0-6-2T	1 ft 11 5/8 in (600 mm)	7		Previously at San Miguel Copper Mines, later Hulleras de Sabero, Spain
Arn Jung	1261	Graf Schwerin-Löwitz	1908	0-6-2WT+T	1 ft 11 3/4 in (603 mm)	99 3353		Previously at Brecon Mountain Railway, originally operated in East Germany
Avonside	2057	Renishaw No.4	1931	0-4-4-0T	1 ft 11 5/8 in (600 mm)		Heilser	Previously at Renishaw Sugar Mills, South Africa
Couilllet	1140	Sabero	1895	0-6-0T	1 ft 11 5/8 in (600 mm)	1		Previously at Hulleras de Sabero, Spain
Couilllet	1209	Sahelices	1898	0-6-0T	1 ft 11 5/8 in (600 mm)	2		Previously at Hulleras de Sabero, Spain
De Winton	106	Kathleen	1877	0-4-0VBT	1 ft 10 3/4 in (578 mm)		Vertical boiler loco	Previously at Penrhyn Quarry Railway
Decauville	1027		1926	0-4-0T	1 ft 11 1/2 in (597 mm)	7	'Progress 5T' type.	Previously at Belgian Industries, Pas-De-Calais, France
Falcon	265	Lisboa	1897	4-4-0+T	2 ft (610 mm)	27	SAR NG6 Class "Lawley" F4 Type	Previously at Beira Railway, South Africa, later at Buzi sugar refinery, Mozambique
Falcon	266	M'Dundo	1897	4-4-0+T	2 ft (610 mm)	28	SAR NG6 Class "Lawley" F4 Type	Previously at Beira Railway, South Africa, later at Buzi sugar refinery, Mozambique
Fowler	10249		1905	0-6-0+T	1 ft 11 3/4 in (603 mm)	6		Previously at Colonial Sugar Refining, Lautoka Mill, Fiji
Fowler	11938		1909	0-4-2T	1 ft 11 5/8 in (600 mm)	S.S.E 21		Previously at Sena sugar, Mozambique
Fowler	15515		1920	0-6-2T	1 ft 11 5/8 in (600 mm)	S.S.E 23		Previously at Sena sugar, Mozambique
Henschel & Sohn	16043		1918	0-4-0T	1 ft 11 5/8 in (600 mm)	102		Previously at Hulleras de Sabero, Spain
Henschel	16073		1918	0-4-2T	1 ft 11 5/8 in (600 mm)	101		Previously at Hulleras de Sabero, Spain
Henschel	29587		1957	2-8-2+T	2 ft (610 mm)	146	SAR NG15	Previously at Avontuur, South Africa. Currently dismantled.
Hudswell Clarke	639	San Justo	1902	0-4-2ST	21 21/32 in (550 mm)	4		Previously at Hullera Vasco-Leonesa, Spain. Currently dismantled.
Hunslet	605	Margaret	1894	0-4-0T	1 ft 11 3/4 in (603 mm)		Small Quarry Hunslet	Previously at Penrhyn Quarry
Kerr Stuart	3114		1918	0-4-0ST	1 ft 11 5/8 in (600 mm)		Wren Class	Previously worked at various locations on construction projects. Worked briefly at a quarry connected to the Ashover Light Railway
Maffei	4766		1916	0-8-0+T	1 ft 11 1/2 in (597 mm)	DFB 968 / 31	Brigadelok	Built for Deutsche Heeresfeldbahn
Manning Wardle	1382	Jubilee 1897	1897	0-4-0ST	1 ft 11 1/2 in (597 mm)			Previouysly at Cilgwyn Slate Quarry, later at Penrhyn Slate Quarry
North British	17111		1906	4-6-2T	2 ft 6 in (762 mm)	666	CC Class	Previously South Eastern Railway of India, Parlakimidi Light Railway, India
Sabero		La Herrera	1937	0-6-0T	1 ft 11 5/8 in (600 mm)	6		Previously at Hulleras de Sabero, Spain. Built there from parts. Currently dismantled.
Société Anglo-Franco-Belge	2668		1951	2-8-2+T	2 ft (610 mm)	121	SAR NG15	Previously operated in South Africa
W. G. Bagnall	2228		1924	0-4-4T	2 ft (610 mm)	18BG		Previously at Kowloon-Canton Railway / Sha Tau Kok Railway, Hong Kong. In 1928 moved to Victorias Milling Co, Negros Occidental, The Philippines
W. G. Bagnall	2457		1932	4-6-2+T	2 ft (610 mm)	38 / 765	Pacific	Previously at Western Railway (India), Dabhoi Gwalior Railway, India
W. G. Bagnall	2460		1932	4-6-2+T	2 ft (610 mm)	41 / 762	Pacific	Previously at Western Railway (India), Dabhoi Gwalior Railway, India
W. G. Bagnall	2545	Renishaw No.5	1936	0-4-4-0T	1 ft 11 5/8 in (600 mm)	5	Meyer	Previously at Renishaw Sugar Mills, South Africa
W. G. Bagnall	2895		1948	0-4-2T	2 ft (610 mm)	RPM No. 2		Previously at Rustenberg Platinum Mines, South Africa

=== Internal Combustion locomotives and Bogie Tender ===
Builder	Works number	Name	Year built	Wheel arr	Gauge	Number	Type	Notes
Dick Kerr			1918	4wDE	1 ft 11 5/8 in (600 mm)	18	Diesel	Previously at Nemours Sand Quarry, France
Ruston Proctor	50823		1915	4wPM	3 ft 3 3/8 in (1,000 mm)		ZLH Paraffin Mechanical	Previously at Cotton Powder Company Believed to be the oldest narrow gauge internal combustion loco in the British Isles
Statfold Barn Railway	9901	Model T Ford	2008		2 ft (610 mm)		Replica Sandy River Inspection Vehicle	Previously at the Beeches Light Railway
Henschel	11854/25		1917		1 ft 11 1/2 in (597 mm)		Bogie Tender to run with Feldbahn locomotives	Previously at Sablieres de Nemours, France

=== Museum collection coaching stock ===
The railway owns a number of historic carriages from other railways.

No.	Year built	Builder	Notes
F68	1909	Metropolitan Carriage & Wagon Co.	Former Isle of Man Railway - Restored by Vale of Rheidol Railway
N40	1879	Swansea Carriage & Wagon	Former Manx Northern Railway No 1- Third Class.
N51	1879	Swansea Carriage & Wagon	Former Manx Northern Railway No 14 - Third Class.
		Sabero	President's Saloon. Previously at Hulleras de Sabero, Spain

== Visiting locomotives ==
The following locomotives have visited the railway in the past.

Image	Number	Name	Builder	Wheel arr.	Year built	Notes
	4	Palmerston	George England	0-4-0ST+T	1864	Hired from the Ffestiniog Railway on various occasions between 1912 and 1923. Returned to the Vale of Rheidol in 2014 and operated a number of special trains to Devil's Bridge.
		Mountaineer	ALCO	2-6-2T	1917	Hired from the Ffestiniog Railway during September 1986.
	1158	Diana	Kerr Stuart	0-4-0T	1917	Restored in Vale of Rheidol Workshops. Steamed in 2015 for first time since 1950. Operated passenger services between Aberystwyth and Capel Bangor during "The Forgotten Engines" gala.
	364	Winifred	Hunslet	0-4-0ST	1885	Visited Vale of Rheidol Railway in 2015 for "The Forgotten Engines" gala. Operated passenger services between Aberystwyth and Capel Bangor. Normally resident at Bala Lake Railway.
	921	Sybil Mary	Hunslet	0-4-0ST	1906	Visited Vale of Rheidol Railway in 2015 for "The Forgotten Engines" gala. Operated passenger services between Aberystwyth and Capel Bangor. Normally resident at Statfold Barn Railway.
	2066	Ogwen	Avonside	0-4-0T	1933	Visited Vale of Rheidol Railway in 2015 for "The Forgotten Engines" gala. Static display only.
	2067	Marchlyn	Avonside	0-4-0T	1933	Visited Vale of Rheidol Railway in 2015 for "The Forgotten Engines" gala. Operated on demonstration line at Aberystwyth. Normally resident at Statfold Barn Railway.
	707	Britomart	Hunslet	0-4-0ST	1899	Visited Vale of Rheidol Railway in 2017 for the Roaring 1920s and 30s event.

== Bibliography ==
- Boyd, James I.C. (1965). Narrow Gauge Railways in Mid Wales. Oakwood Press. ISBN 0-85361-024-X.
- Green, CC (1986). The Vale of Rheidol Light Railway. Wild Swan. ISBN 0-906867-43-6.
- Johnson, Peter (1999). Welsh Narrow Gauge: a view from the past. Ian Allan Publishing. ISBN 0-7110-2654-8.
- Johnson, Peter (2011). An Illustrated History of the Great Western Narrow Gauge. OPC. ISBN 978-0-86093-636-7.
- Phillips, Stephen; ap Iolo, Llyr; Gambrill, Robert; Bance, Robert (2021). The Vale of Rheidol Railway In Detail. Vale of Rheidol Railway. ISBN 978-0-95445-464-7.
- Wade, E.A. (1997). The Plynlimon & Hafan Tramway. Twelveheads Press. ISBN 0-90629438-X.
