= Paulet =

Paulet, variant spelling Powlett, is a surname. Notable people with the surname include:

- Amias Paulet (1532–1588), English diplomat
- Anthony Paulet (1562–1600), Governor of the Isle of Jersey (1588–1600)
- Charles Paulet, 1st Duke of Bolton (c. 1625 – 1699)
- Charles Paulet, 2nd Duke of Bolton (1661–1722)
- Charles Powlett, 3rd Duke of Bolton (1685–1754)
- Charles Powlett, 5th Duke of Bolton (1718–1765)
- Charles Powlett (1728–1809), English clergyman and cricket administrator
- Charles Paulet, 13th Marquess of Winchester (1764–1843)
- Charles Armand Powlett (c. 1694 – 1751), British soldier
- Christopher Paulet, Earl of Wiltshire (born 1969)
- Frederick Powlett (1811–1865), Australian politician and cricket administrator
- George Paulet (1553–1608) (died 1608), English soldier
- George Paulet, 12th Marquess of Winchester (1722–1800), English courtier
- Lord George Paulet (1803–1879), officer in the Royal Navy
- Harry Powlett, 4th Duke of Cleveland (1803–1891)
- Harry Powlett, 4th Duke of Bolton (1691–1759)
- Harry Powlett, 6th Duke of Bolton (1720–1794)
- Henry Paulet (1767–1832), Royal Navy vice-admiral
- Henry Powlett, 3rd Baron Bayning (1797–1866)
- John Paulet, 2nd Marquess of Winchester (c. 1510 – 1576)
- John Paulet, 5th Marquess of Winchester (c. 1598 – 1675)
- Jean-Jacques Paulet (1740–1826), French mycologist
- Iozefina Păuleţ (born 1989), Romanian and Dutch women chess grandmaster
- Lord Nassau Powlett (1698–1741), English nobleman and politician
- Nigel Paulet, 18th Marquess of Winchester (born 1941)
- N. Paulet – French lieutenant-colonel who signed the Paulet–Newcombe Agreement in 1923 on behalf of the French government
- Pedro Paulet (1874–1945), Peruvian scientist
- Thomas Orde-Powlett, 1st Baron Bolton (1740–1807)
- William Paulet, 1st Marquess of Winchester (c. 1483 – 1572), English statesman
- William Paulet, 3rd Marquess of Winchester (1532–1598)
- William Paulet, 4th Marquess of Winchester (c. 1560 – 1628)
- William Paulet, Lord St John (c. 1587 – 1621)
- William Orde-Powlett, 5th Baron Bolton (1869–1944)
- Lord William Paulet (1804–1893), British Army officer
- Lord William Powlett (c. 1667 – 1729), English MP for Winchester 1689–1710

== See also ==
- Pawlett, Somerset, a village in the West of England
- Paulet Island, island located off Graham Land Peninsula in Antarctica
- Paulet Affair, 1843 incident in which the namesake British naval officer occupied Hawaii for five months
- Powlett River, in Victoria, Australia

The noble family of Paulet, also known as the House of Paulet, held significant influence and prominence in England during various periods of history. The family traces its origins back to the medieval era and has played an important role in Hampshire's history.

The Paulet family gained prominence during the Tudor period, particularly in the 16th century. They were staunch supporters of the Tudor monarchs, notably Queen Mary I and Queen Elizabeth I. The family's most notable figure during this time was William Paulet, who was created the 1st Marquess of Winchester by Queen Mary I. He served as Lord High Treasurer of England and was one of the wealthiest men in the country. The title of Marquess of Winchester became hereditary in the Paulet family.

The Paulet family owned extensive estates in Hampshire, with Basing House in Basingstoke being their primary seat. Basing House was a grand and formidable mansion, serving as the family's stronghold. It was known for its impressive architecture and played a role in the English Civil War.

Throughout the centuries, the Paulet family maintained their influence and wealth. They held various titles and positions of power, including High Sheriff of Hampshire. However, by the 18th century, the family's fortunes began to decline, and their prominence gradually diminished.

Today, while the direct line of the Paulet family's noble titles has become extinct, their legacy remains in Hampshire's history. Basing House, although in ruins after the English Civil War, still stands as a historic site and testament to the family's once-great influence in the region.
