= Nigel Paulet, 18th Marquess of Winchester =

Marquess of Winchester (1941–2016)

The Most Honourable The Marquess of Winchester
- Predecessor: Richard Paulet, 17th Marquess of Winchester
- Born: Nigel George Paulet; 23 December 1941; Salisbury, Southern Rhodesia
- Died: 8 April 2016 (aged 74); Gauteng, South Africa
- Spouse: Rosemary Hilton (m. 1967)
- Issue: Christopher Paulet, 19th Marquess of Winchester; Lord Richard Paulet; Lady Susan Paulet Hains
- Parents: George Cecil Paulet; Hazel Margaret Wheeler

Nigel George Paulet, 18th Marquess of Winchester (23 December 1941 – 8 April 2016) was a British peer and the premier marquess of England. He succeeded a cousin in the title in 1968. Lord Winchester lived in South Africa. He served as a member of the House of Lords for over thirty years from 5 March 1968 to 11 November 1999.

== Early life ==
Nigel George Paulet was born on 23 December 1941 to George Cecil Paulet (1905–1961) and Hazel Margaret Wheeler. He has two siblings, an older sister, Angela Jane Paulet (b. 1939), and a younger brother, Timothy Guy Paulet (born 1944). After his father's death in 1961, his mother remarried, to George Meyer, in 1962.

Paulet's great-great-grandfather was Lord Charles Paulet (1802–1870), the son of Charles Paulet, 13th Marquess of Winchester. Upon the death of his unmarried first cousin once removed, Richard Paulet, 17th Marquess of Winchester, on 5 March 1968, the 26-year-old Nigel became the 18th Marquess of Winchester, the highest-ranking marquess in the United Kingdom. The 17th Marquess's grandfather, Colonel Charles William Paulet, was the great-grandfather of the 18th Marquess.

== Parliament ==
Winchester's maiden speech in the House of Lords on 11 November 1970 was in favour of ending sanctions against Rhodesia.

Most of his later speeches were on the matters concerning Rhodesia and Southern Africa.

== Personal life ==
On 25 November 1967, he married Rosemary Anne Hilton, daughter of Major Aubrey John Hilton. They have two sons and one daughter:

- Christopher John Hilton Paulet, 19th Marquess of Winchester (born 30 July 1969); married Christine Mary Town in 1992, had issue:
  - Lady Emma Louise Paulet (born 1 April 1993)
  - Michael John Paulet, Earl of Wiltshire (born 31 August 1999)
- Lord Richard George Paulet (born 16 August 1971)
- Lady Susan Paulet (born 1976); married Major Lloyd Hains in 2006, child:
  - Nicholas Roger Eaton Hains (born 12 April 2007)

=== Death ===
Paulet died in Gauteng, South Africa on 8 April 2016, at the age of 74. An announcement of his death was not made public until 2019.

Earls of Wiltshire, Marquesses of Winchester and Dukes of Bolton family tree

Earl of Wiltshire (1st creation), 1139	Earl of Wiltshire (1st creation recreated), after 1143; Earl of Salisbury (1st creation), 1145
Hervey le Breton c. 1110–1168; 1st Earl of Wiltshire, Viscount of Léon	Patrick of Salisbury c. 1122–1168; 1st Earl of Salisbury and Earl of Wiltshire
Earldom of Wiltshire (1st creation) lapsed, 1141
King Henry II; 1133–1189	Ida de Tosny (d. after 1181)	William of Salisbury d. 1196; 2nd Earl of Salisbury and Earl of Wiltshire
William Longespée; 1176–1226; 3rd Earl of Salisbury and Earl of Wiltshire jure uxoris	Ela of Salisbury; 1187–1261; 3rd Countess of Salisbury and Countess of Wiltshire
William III Longespée d. 1257
Margaret Longespée d. 1310; 4th Countess of Salisbury and Countess of Wiltshire
Alice de Lacy; 1281–1348; 4th Countess of Lincoln, 5th Countess of Salisbury and Countess of Wiltshire suo jure
Earl of Wiltshire (2nd creation), 1397	Earldoms of Wiltshire (1st creation) and Salisbury (1st creation) forfeit, 1322
William Scrope; 1350–1399; Earl of Wiltshire
Earldom of Wiltshire (2nd creation) forfeit, 1399
James Butler; 1393–1452; Earl of Ormond	Humphrey Stafford; 1402–1460; Duke of Buckingham, Earl of Stafford
Earl of Wiltshire (3rd creation), 1449	Earl of Wiltshire (4th creation), 1470
James Butler; 1420–1461; Earl of Ormond, Earl of Wiltshire	Thomas Butler; 1426–1515; Earl of Ormond	Humphrey Stafford c. 1425–1458	John Stafford; 1427–1473; 1st Earl of Wiltshire
Earldom of Wiltshire (3rd creation) forfeit, 1461
Margaret Butler c. 1454–1539	Henry Stafford; 1455–1483; Duke of Buckingham, Earl of Stafford	Edward Stafford; 1470–1499; 2nd Earl of Wiltshire
Earldom of Wiltshire (4th creation) extinct, 1499
Baron St John, 1539, Earl of Wiltshire (7th creation), 1550; Marquess of Winchester, 1551	Earl of Wiltshire (6th creation), 1529	Earl of Wiltshire (5th creation), 1510
William Paulet c. 1483/1485–1572; 1st Marquess of Winchester and Earl of Wiltshire	Thomas Boleyn c. 1477–1539; Earl of Ormond, Earl of Wiltshire	Henry Stafford c. 1479–1523; Earl of Wiltshire
Earldom of Wiltshire (6th creation) extinct, 1539	Earldom of Wiltshire (5th creation) extinct, 1523
John Paulet c. 1510–1576; 2nd Marquess of Winchester and Earl of Wiltshire	Anne Boleyn c. 1501–1536	King Henry VIII; 1491–1547
William Paulet c. 1532–1598; 3rd Marquess of Winchester and Earl of Wiltshire	Queen Elizabeth I 1533–1603
William Paulet c. 1560–1628; 4th Marquess of Winchester and Earl of Wiltshire
William Paulet c. 1587/1588–1621 styled Earl of Wiltshire	John Paulet c. 1598–1674; 5th Marquess of Winchester and Earl of Wiltshire	Henry Paulet d. 1672
Duke of Bolton, 1689
Charles Paulet d. 1699; 1st Duke of Bolton, 6th Marquess of Winchester and Earl of Wiltshire	Francis Paulet c. 1645–1695/1696
Charles Paulet; 1661–1722; 2nd Duke of Bolton, 7th Marquess of Winchester and Earl of Wiltshire	Norton Paulet c. 1679–1741
Charles Powlett; 1685–1754; 3rd Duke of Bolton, 8th Marquess of Winchester and Earl of Wiltshire	Harry Powlett; 1691–1759; 4th Duke of Bolton, 9th Marquess of Winchester and Earl of Wiltshire
Charles Powlett d. 1765; 5th Duke of Bolton, 10th Marquess of Winchester and Earl of Wiltshire	Harry Powlett; 1720–1794; 6th Duke of Bolton, 11th Marquess of Winchester and Earl of Wiltshire	George Paulet; 1722–1800; 12th Marquess of Winchester and Earl of Wiltshire
Dukedom of Bolton extinct
Charles Ingoldsby Paulet; 1765–1843; 13th Marquess of Winchester and Earl of Wiltshire
John Paulet; 1801–1887; 14th Marquess of Winchester and Earl of Wiltshire	Lord Charles Paulet; 1802–1870
Augustus John Henry Beaumont Paulet; 1858–1899; 15th Marquess of Winchester and Earl of Wiltshire	Henry William Montague Paulet; 1862–1962; 16th Marquess of Winchester and Earl of Wiltshire	Charles William Paulet; 1832–1897
Charles Standish Paulet; 1873–1953	Cecil Henry Paulet; 1875–1916
Richard Charles Paulet; 1905–1968; 17th Marquess of Winchester and Earl of Wiltshire	George Cecil Paulet; 1905–1961
Nigel George Paulet; 1941–2016; 18th Marquess of Winchester and Earl of Wiltshire
Christopher John Hilton Paulet b. 1969; 19th Marquess of Winchester and Earl of Wiltshire
Michael John Paulet b. 1999 styled Earl of Wiltshire; Heir apparent to the Marquessate

Peerage of England
Preceded by Richard Paulet	Marquess of Winchester; 1968–2016	Succeeded by Christopher Paulet
