= Earl of Wiltshire =

Title in the Peerage of England

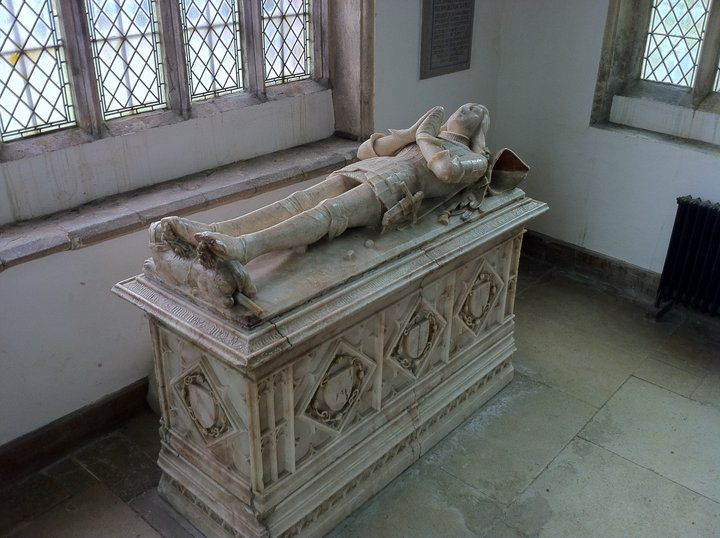
Monument to Edward Stafford, 2nd Earl of Wiltshire (1470–99) in St Peter's parish church, Lowick, Northamptonshire.

The title Earl of Wiltshire is one of the oldest in the Peerage of England, going back to the 12th century. It is currently held by the Marquess of Winchester, and is used as a courtesy title for the eldest son of the marquess.

The earldom was first created for Harvey of Léon, who married Sybilla, an illegitimate daughter of King Stephen. The title lapsed after Harvey lost his English lands during The Anarchy, since at that time one could not be an earl without the territory to support the dignity.

Patrick of Salisbury was created Earl of Wiltshire by the Empress Matilda, probably after July 1143, but he was usually styled Earl of Salisbury. He was the second but eldest surviving son of William of Salisbury and the grandson of Walter of Salisbury, the founder of Bradenstoke Priory, in Wiltshire. He was Sheriff of Wiltshire in October 1152, when he was addressed as "Earl Patrick, sheriff" in a writ of Stephen. Patrick of Salisbury, Earl of Wiltshire, passed the title to his great-granddaughter Margaret Longespée. She married Henry de Lacy, Earl of Lincoln, they had a daughter who became suo jure Countess of Lincoln and Wiltshire on her mother's death. She married three times, but the earldom of Wiltshire seems to have reverted to the Crown with her death in October 1348.

William le Scrope was created Earl of Wiltshire in 1397. He was executed during the events leading to the deposition of Richard II by Henry IV. The charter which granted his earldom limited its inheritance to heirs male, but did not contain the usual additional limitation of his body. Thus in 1859 a collateral descendant attempted to claim the earldom, but the claim was rejected by the House of Lords.

The next creation was for James Butler, eldest son of the 4th Earl of Ormond. He fought on the Lancastrian side at the Battle of Towton, and afterwards was executed and posthumously attainted.

The earldom was next held by three members of the Stafford family, beginning with John, a younger son of the 1st Duke of Buckingham.

Anne Boleyn's father Thomas was the recipient of the next creation, but after outliving his son and with no other male heirs upon his death the title became vacant. He was the great-nephew of James Butler, the earl of the 1449 creation.

Finally, in 1550 William Paulet was created Earl of Wiltshire. He was made Marquess of Winchester the next year, and his descendants continue to hold both titles.

== Earl of Wiltshire, First Creation (1139) ==
- Hervey le Breton, Earl of Wiltshire (forfeit 1141)

== Earl of Wiltshire, creation by the Empress Matilda (c. 1145) ==
- Patrick of Salisbury, 1st Earl of Salisbury (c. 1122–1168)
- William of Salisbury, 2nd Earl of Salisbury (d. 1196)
- William Longespée, 3rd Earl of Salisbury (c. 1176–1226), jure uxoris Ela, Countess of Salisbury (1187–1261)
- Margaret Longespée, Countess of Salisbury (c. 1261 – c. 1311), granddaughter of the 3rd Earl by his son William III Longespée. She married Henry de Lacy, Earl of Lincoln.
- Alice de Lacy, 4th Countess of Lincoln (1281–1348)

== Earl of Wiltshire, Second Creation (1397) ==
- William le Scrope, 1st Earl of Wiltshire (1350–1399) (executed 1399)

== Earl of Wiltshire, Third Creation (1449) ==
- James Butler, Earl of Wiltshire and 5th Earl of Ormond (1420–1461) (forfeit 1461)

== Earl of Wiltshire, Fourth Creation (1470) ==
- John Stafford, 1st Earl of Wiltshire (d. 1473)
- Edward Stafford, 2nd Earl of Wiltshire (1469–1499) (extinct)

== Earl of Wiltshire, Fifth Creation (1510) ==
- Henry Stafford, 1st Earl of Wiltshire (1479–1523) (extinct)

== Earl of Wiltshire, Sixth Creation (1529) ==
- Thomas Boleyn, 1st Earl of Wiltshire and 1st Earl of Ormond (1477–1539) (extinct)

== Earl of Wiltshire, Seventh Creation (1550) ==
- see Marquess of Winchester

The title 'Earl of Wiltshire' is now used as the courtesy title of Lord Winchester's eldest son and heir.

== Family tree ==
Earls of Wiltshire, Marquesses of Winchester and Dukes of Bolton family tree

Earl of Wiltshire (1st creation), 1139	Earl of Wiltshire (1st creation recreated), after 1143; Earl of Salisbury (1st creation), 1145
Hervey le Breton c. 1110–1168; 1st Earl of Wiltshire, Viscount of Léon	Patrick of Salisbury c. 1122–1168; 1st Earl of Salisbury and Earl of Wiltshire
Earldom of Wiltshire (1st creation) lapsed, 1141
King Henry II; 1133–1189	Ida de Tosny (d. after 1181)	William of Salisbury d. 1196; 2nd Earl of Salisbury and Earl of Wiltshire
William Longespée; 1176–1226; 3rd Earl of Salisbury and Earl of Wiltshire jure uxoris	Ela of Salisbury; 1187–1261; 3rd Countess of Salisbury and Countess of Wiltshire
William III Longespée d. 1257
Margaret Longespée d. 1310; 4th Countess of Salisbury and Countess of Wiltshire
Alice de Lacy; 1281–1348; 4th Countess of Lincoln, 5th Countess of Salisbury and Countess of Wiltshire suo jure
Earl of Wiltshire (2nd creation), 1397	Earldoms of Wiltshire (1st creation) and Salisbury (1st creation) forfeit, 1322
William Scrope; 1350–1399; Earl of Wiltshire
Earldom of Wiltshire (2nd creation) forfeit, 1399
James Butler; 1393–1452; Earl of Ormond	Humphrey Stafford; 1402–1460; Duke of Buckingham, Earl of Stafford
Earl of Wiltshire (3rd creation), 1449	Earl of Wiltshire (4th creation), 1470
James Butler; 1420–1461; Earl of Ormond, Earl of Wiltshire	Thomas Butler; 1426–1515; Earl of Ormond	Humphrey Stafford c. 1425–1458	John Stafford; 1427–1473; 1st Earl of Wiltshire
Earldom of Wiltshire (3rd creation) forfeit, 1461
Margaret Butler c. 1454–1539	Henry Stafford; 1455–1483; Duke of Buckingham, Earl of Stafford	Edward Stafford; 1470–1499; 2nd Earl of Wiltshire
Earldom of Wiltshire (4th creation) extinct, 1499
Baron St John, 1539, Earl of Wiltshire (7th creation), 1550; Marquess of Winchester, 1551	Earl of Wiltshire (6th creation), 1529	Earl of Wiltshire (5th creation), 1510
William Paulet c. 1483/1485–1572; 1st Marquess of Winchester and Earl of Wiltshire	Thomas Boleyn c. 1477–1539; Earl of Ormond, Earl of Wiltshire	Henry Stafford c. 1479–1523; Earl of Wiltshire
Earldom of Wiltshire (6th creation) extinct, 1539	Earldom of Wiltshire (5th creation) extinct, 1523
John Paulet c. 1510–1576; 2nd Marquess of Winchester and Earl of Wiltshire	Anne Boleyn c. 1501–1536	King Henry VIII; 1491–1547
William Paulet c. 1532–1598; 3rd Marquess of Winchester and Earl of Wiltshire	Queen Elizabeth I 1533–1603
William Paulet c. 1560–1628; 4th Marquess of Winchester and Earl of Wiltshire
William Paulet c. 1587/1588–1621 styled Earl of Wiltshire	John Paulet c. 1598–1674; 5th Marquess of Winchester and Earl of Wiltshire	Henry Paulet d. 1672
Duke of Bolton, 1689
Charles Paulet d. 1699; 1st Duke of Bolton, 6th Marquess of Winchester and Earl of Wiltshire	Francis Paulet c. 1645–1695/1696
Charles Paulet; 1661–1722; 2nd Duke of Bolton, 7th Marquess of Winchester and Earl of Wiltshire	Norton Paulet c. 1679–1741
Charles Powlett; 1685–1754; 3rd Duke of Bolton, 8th Marquess of Winchester and Earl of Wiltshire	Harry Powlett; 1691–1759; 4th Duke of Bolton, 9th Marquess of Winchester and Earl of Wiltshire
Charles Powlett d. 1765; 5th Duke of Bolton, 10th Marquess of Winchester and Earl of Wiltshire	Harry Powlett; 1720–1794; 6th Duke of Bolton, 11th Marquess of Winchester and Earl of Wiltshire	George Paulet; 1722–1800; 12th Marquess of Winchester and Earl of Wiltshire
Dukedom of Bolton extinct
Charles Ingoldsby Paulet; 1765–1843; 13th Marquess of Winchester and Earl of Wiltshire
John Paulet; 1801–1887; 14th Marquess of Winchester and Earl of Wiltshire	Lord Charles Paulet; 1802–1870
Augustus John Henry Beaumont Paulet; 1858–1899; 15th Marquess of Winchester and Earl of Wiltshire	Henry William Montague Paulet; 1862–1962; 16th Marquess of Winchester and Earl of Wiltshire	Charles William Paulet; 1832–1897
Charles Standish Paulet; 1873–1953	Cecil Henry Paulet; 1875–1916
Richard Charles Paulet; 1905–1968; 17th Marquess of Winchester and Earl of Wiltshire	George Cecil Paulet; 1905–1961
Nigel George Paulet; 1941–2016; 18th Marquess of Winchester and Earl of Wiltshire
Christopher John Hilton Paulet b. 1969; 19th Marquess of Winchester and Earl of Wiltshire
Michael John Paulet b. 1999 styled Earl of Wiltshire; Heir apparent to the Marquessate

== See also ==
- Henry Carey, 1st Baron Hunsdon, who was offered the title but declined it
