= Baron St John of Basing =

Barony in the Peerage of England

Arms of St John: Argent, on a chief gules two mullets or

Baron St John of Basing is a former title in the Peerage of England. The family of St John of Basing in Hampshire and of Halnaker in Sussex was descended in the male line from the Norman Hugh de Port (d.1091) lord of the manor of Port-en-Bessin in Normandy who took part in the Norman Conquest of England in 1066, and was subsequently granted 53 manors in Hampshire. They had adopted the St. John surname by 1205.)

On 29 December 1299 John St John was summoned to Parliament, and thereby became the 1st Baron. Following his decease his son was never summoned nor was his grandson, Edmund de St John, 3rd Baron St John (1333-1347) of Basing, who died in Calais aged 14 a few days after the Siege of Calais. On his death in 1347 the barony fell into abeyance between his two sisters Margaret and Isabel. Fourteen years later in 1361, the death without issue of Margaret's only son and heir John St Philibert (alias St John) resulted in the termination of the abeyance in favour of the remaining sister Isabel St John, whose husband Lucas de Poynings was summoned in 1367/8, presumably in her right. At the death of Thomas Poynings, 5th Baron St John in 1428/9, the barony fell into abeyance again among his grand-daughters and their heirs. William Paulet, a descendant of the middle granddaughter, was summoned in 1538/9 (as Baron St John in his initial summons, but later as Baron St. John of Basing). He was not the senior heir, and this represented a new creation and not the termination of the abeyance. He was later created Earl of Wiltshire and Marquess of Winchester, into which titles the new barony merged.

The later Barons St John of Bletso (created 1582) in Bedfordshire is suggested to have been a cadet line of St John of Basing, but clear evidence is lacking.

== Barons St John de Basing (1299) ==
By Writ of Summons dated 29 December 1299, 28 Edward I:

- John St John, 1st Baron St John (d. 1329) - His arms and name were recorded as Argent, on a chief gules, two mullets or...Sire Johan de Sein Johan.
  - Hugh St John, 2nd Baron St John (d. 1337), never summoned
    - Edmund St John, 3rd Baron St John (d. 1347), never summoned (abeyant 1347)
    - Margaret St. John, m. John St. Philibert
      - John St. Philibert alias St. John, d. 1361, when his aunt became sole heiress
    - Isabel St John, 4th Baroness St John (m. 1350, d. 1393), married Lucas de Poynings (d. c.1385) (summoned to Parliament, probably in her right, 24 February 1367/8 - 20 January 1375/6)
      - Thomas Poynings, 5th Baron St John (d. 1428/1429) (abeyant 1428/1429), married Philippa Mortimer, daughter of Edmund Mortimer, 3rd Earl of March
        - Hugh Poynings, died 1426, leaving daughters among whose heirs the title fell into abeyance following his father's death
          - Joan, married Thomas Bonville.
          - Constance, married John Paulet. They were great-grandparents of William Paulet, Baron St. John, later Marquess of Winchester.
          - Alice, married first, John Orrell, married second Thomas Kingston.

An unsuccessful claim to the barony was made by Francis William Forester in 1914–15, the St John Peerage Case [1915] AC 282.

== Barons St John (1539) ==
On 9 March 1539 a Barony of Saint John was created for:

- William Paulet, 1st Baron St John (later created Earl of Wiltshire and Marquess of Winchester), great-grandson of Constance Paulet, granddaughter and one of the heiresses of Thomas Paulet, 5th Baron. For further succession, see Marquess of Winchester.

== Sources ==
- Cokayne, George Edward, Geoffrey H. White, ed. (1949). The Complete Peerage, or a history of the House of Lords and all its members from the earliest times Vol. 11 (2nd ed.). London: The St. Catherine Press.
