= Marquess of Winchester =

Title in the Peerage of England

Marquessate of Winchester
- Sable, three swords pilewise points in base proper pomels and hilts or
- Creation date: 12 October 1551
- Created by: Edward VI
- Peerage: Peerage of England
- First holder: William Paulet, 1st Marquess of Winchester
- Present holder: Christopher Paulet, 19th Marquess of Winchester
- Heir apparent: Michael Paulet, Earl of Wiltshire
- Remainder to: the 1st Earl's heirs male whatsoever
- Subsidiary titles: Earl of Wiltshire; Baron St John
- Status: Extant
- Motto: Aimez Loyaulté (Love Loyalty)

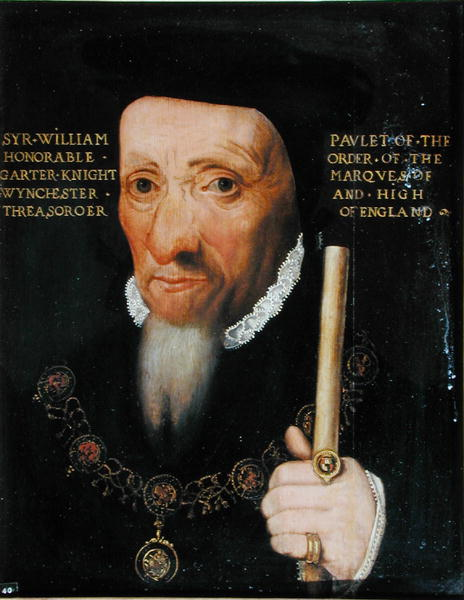
William Paulet, 1st Marquess of Winchester and Lord High Treasurer of England

Marquess of Winchester is a title in the Peerage of England that was created in 1551 for the prominent statesman William Paulet, 1st Earl of Wiltshire. It is the oldest of six surviving English marquessates; therefore its holder is considered the premier marquess of England. It is also now the only marquessate in the Peerage of England not being subsidiary to a higher title (although it was formerly subsidiary to the extinct Dukedom of Bolton; the other five are all still held by dukes). The current holder is Christopher Paulet, 19th Marquess of Winchester (born 1969), whose son uses the courtesy title Earl of Wiltshire.

== History ==
The peerage was created in 1551 for the prominent statesman William Paulet, 1st Earl of Wiltshire. The king at the time was Edward VI, who was not of age, and the decision was that of John Dudley, 1st Duke of Northumberland, who in the same year promoted himself to a dukedom. Paulet had already been created Baron St John in 1539 and Earl of Wiltshire in 1550, also in the Peerage of England. The first marquess was one of the most noted statesmen of his time, serving in high positions under King Henry VIII and his children, and served as Lord High Treasurer of England from 1550 to 1572. He was succeeded by his son, the second marquess, who had been summoned to the House of Lords in his father's lifetime through a writ of acceleration in his father's junior title of Baron St John. His son, the third marquess, was summoned to the House of Lords through a writ of acceleration as Lord St John in 1572. His grandson, the fifth marquess, represented St Ives in the House of Commons. During the Civil War he was a strong supporter of King Charles I and became known as "the loyal Marquess". The family seat of Basing House was burnt to the ground by the Parliamentarians during the conflict. During this period, the courtesy title for the heirs apparent of the marquesses was Baron St John; that of Earl of Wiltshire does not seem to have been used, perhaps because of an unsubstantiated tradition that that title was surrendered upon the creation of the marquessate. Another explanation could be possible embarrassment arising from the fact that his son Charles married Mary Scrope, whose father the 11th Lord Scrope of Bolton and 1st Earl of Sunderland, was the direct heir of the original Earl of Wiltshire, beheaded by Henry IV in 1399. The original "Earl of Wiltshire" title had been in abeyance since then.

He was succeeded by his son, the sixth marquess. The sixth marquess was a supporter of King William III and Queen Mary II and was rewarded for his support after the Glorious Revolution when he was created Duke of Bolton. He was succeeded by his son, the second duke, who, as heir apparent to the marquessate in 1675, was the first to adopt the courtesy title of Earl of Wiltshire. The second Duke was a politician and notably served as Lord Chamberlain of the Household and as Lord Lieutenant of Ireland. On his death the titles passed to his son, the third duke, who was also a politician. He was a Whig Member of Parliament and served as lord lieutenant of several counties. In 1717 he was meant to be summoned to the House of Lords through a writ of acceleration in his father's junior title of Baron St John (of Basing). However, he was mistakenly summoned as Lord Pawlett of Basing and this inadvertently created a new barony.

However, the barony of Pawlett of Basing became extinct as he had no legitimate offspring while he was succeeded in the other titles by his younger brother, the fourth duke. He notably served as a Lord of the Admiralty and as lord lieutenant of both Hampshire and Glamorganshire. His eldest son, the fifth duke, was a member of Parliament and Lord Lieutenant of Hampshire. He was succeeded by his younger brother, the sixth duke. He was an admiral of the White. The sixth duke had no sons and on his death in 1794 the dukedom became extinct. Most of the family estates passed to his niece Jean Mary Browne-Powlett, illegitimate daughter of the fifth duke. She was the wife of Thomas Orde, who assumed the additional surname of Powlett and was created Baron Bolton in 1797.

The sixth duke was succeeded in the Barony of St John, the Earldom of Wiltshire and the Marquessate of Winchester by his third cousin once removed George Paulet, who became the twelfth marquess. He was the great-grandson of Lord Henry Paulet, third son of the fourth marquess. He had earlier represented Winchester in Parliament. His son, the thirteenth marquess, was a member of Parliament for Truro and served as Lord Lieutenant of Hampshire. In 1839 Lord Winchester assumed the additional surname of Burroughs. He was succeeded by his son, the fourteenth marquess. He was also Lord Lieutenant of Hampshire. His son, the fifteenth marquess, was a major in the Coldstream Guards and was killed in action at the Battle of Magersfontein in 1899 during the Second Boer War. He was succeeded by his younger brother, the sixteenth marquess. He was Lord Lieutenant of Hampshire and Chairman of the Hampshire County Council. On his death in 1962 at the age of 99 the line of the fourteenth marquess failed.

He was succeeded by his first cousin twice removed, the seventeenth marquess. He was the great-grandson of the Reverend Lord Charles Paulet, second son of the thirteenth marquess. On the seventeenth marquess's death in 1968 this line of the family also failed and the title passed to the seventeenth marquess's first cousin once removed, the eighteenth marquess, who died in 2016. Lord Winchester lived in South Africa.

The surname of the later dukes of Bolton is usually spelled "Powlett" rather than "Paulet". This spelling continues to be used by the Orde-Powlett family.

The Marquessate of Winchester is the oldest English marquessate still in existence, and as a result the holder of the peerage is the premier marquess of England. The marquess of Winchester is also the only one in the peerage of England without a higher title; as all other marquesses in that peerage are also dukes.

Earl of Wiltshire is used as the courtesy title of Lord Winchester's eldest son and heir, while Lord Wiltshire's son and heir has the courtesy title Lord St John.

One of the main family seats was Basing House, near Old Basing, Hampshire.

== Marquesses of Winchester (1551) ==
- William Paulet, 1st Marquess of Winchester (died 1572)
- John Paulet, 2nd Marquess of Winchester (c. 1510–1576)
- William Paulet, 3rd Marquess of Winchester (c. 1535–1598)
- William Paulet, 4th Marquess of Winchester (c. 1560–1628)
- John Paulet, 5th Marquess of Winchester (c. 1598–1674)
- Charles Paulet, 6th Marquess of Winchester (died 1699) (created Duke of Bolton in 1689)

=== Dukes of Bolton (1689) ===
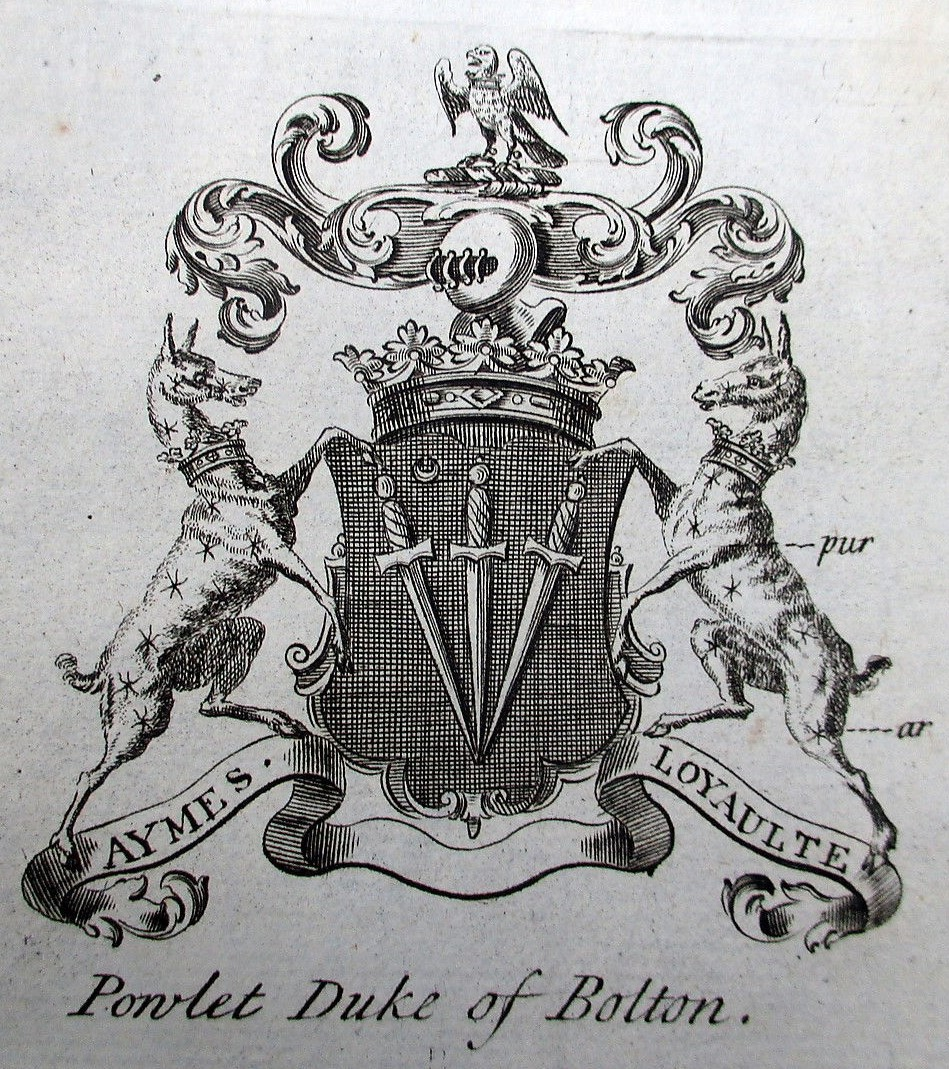
Heraldic achievement of "'Powlet Duke of Bolton", from The Peerage of England by Arthur Collins, 1768

- Charles Paulet, 1st Duke of Bolton (died 1699)
- Charles Paulet, 2nd Duke of Bolton (1661–1722)
- Charles Powlett, 3rd Duke of Bolton (1685–1754)
- Harry Powlett, 4th Duke of Bolton (1691–1759)
- Charles Powlett, 5th Duke of Bolton (died 1765)
- Harry Powlett, 6th Duke of Bolton (1720–1794)

The line was continued by the descendants of the 5th duke's natural daughter whose husband (Thomas Orde) was created Baron Bolton in 1797.

=== Marquesses of Winchester (1551; reverted) ===
- George Paulet, 12th Marquess of Winchester (1722–1800)
- Charles Ingoldsby Paulet, 13th Marquess of Winchester (1765–1843)
- John Paulet, 14th Marquess of Winchester (1801–1887)
- Augustus John Henry Beaumont Paulet, 15th Marquess of Winchester (1858–1899)
- Henry William Montague Paulet, 16th Marquess of Winchester (1862–1962)
- Richard Charles Paulet, 17th Marquess of Winchester (1905–1968)
- Nigel George Paulet, 18th Marquess of Winchester (1941–2016)
- Christopher John Hilton Paulet, 19th Marquess of Winchester (born 1969)

== Present peer ==
Christopher John Hilton Paulet, 19th Marquess of Winchester (born 30 July 1969), is the son of the 18th Marquess and his wife Rosemary Anne Hilton. From birth until 2016 he was styled formally as Earl of Wiltshire. He was a guitarist with the pop group Wizard. On 8 April 2016, he succeeded as Marquess of Winchester (1551), Earl of Wiltshire (1550), and Baron St. John (1539), all in the peerage of England.

In 1992, he married Christine Town, daughter of Peter Town, and they have a son, Michael John Paulet, Earl of Wiltshire (born 1999), who is heir apparent to the peerages.

=== Line of succession ===
Line of succession
- Charles Paulet, 13th Marquess of Winchester (1764–1843)
  - John Paulet, 14th Marquess of Winchester (1801–1887)
    - Augustus Paulet, 15th Marquess of Winchester (1858–1899)
    - Henry Paulet, 16th Marquess of Winchester (1862–1962)
  - Rev. Lord Charles Paulet (1802–1870)
    - Charles William Paulet (1832–1897)
      - Charles Standish Paulet (1873–1953)
        - Richard Paulet, 17th Marquess of Winchester (1905–1968)
      - Cecil Henry Paulet (1875–1916)
        - George Cecil Paulet (1905–1961)
          - Nigel Paulet, 18th Marquess of Winchester (1941–2016)
            - Christopher Paulet, 19th Marquess of Winchester (b. 1969)
              - (1). Michael Paulet, Earl of Wiltshire (b. 1999)
            - (2). Lord Richard George Paulet (b. 1971)
          - (3). Timothy Guy Paulet (b. 1944)
            - (4). Timothy Guy Paulet (b. 1975)
            - (5). Michael Raoul Paulet (b. 1976)

== Arms ==
Coat of arms of Marquess of Winchester
Coronet Coronet of a Marquess Crest A Falcon displayed Or belled of the same and ducally collared Gules. Escutcheon Sable three Swords in pile points downwards proper pommelled and hilted Or. Supporters On either side a Hind Purpure semée of Estoiles and ducally gorged Or. Motto Aimez Loyaulté (Love loyalty).

== Family tree ==
Earls of Wiltshire, Marquesses of Winchester and Dukes of Bolton family tree

Earl of Wiltshire (1st creation), 1139	Earl of Wiltshire (1st creation recreated), after 1143; Earl of Salisbury (1st creation), 1145
Hervey le Breton c. 1110–1168; 1st Earl of Wiltshire, Viscount of Léon	Patrick of Salisbury c. 1122–1168; 1st Earl of Salisbury and Wiltshire
Earldom of Wiltshire (1st creation) lapsed, 1141
King Henry II; 1133–1189	Ida de Tosny (d. after 1181)	William of Salisbury d. 1196; 2nd Earl of Salisbury and Wiltshire
William Longespée; 1176–1226; 3rd Earl of Salisbury and Wiltshire jure uxoris	Ela of Salisbury; 1187–1261; 3rd Countess of Salisbury and Wiltshire suo jure
William III Longespée d. 1257
Margaret Longespée d. 1310; 4th Countess of Salisbury and Wiltshire suo jure
Alice de Lacy; 1281–1348; 4th Countess of Lincoln, 5th Countess of Salisbury and Wiltshire suo jure
Earl of Wiltshire (2nd creation), 1397	Earldoms of Wiltshire (1st creation) and Salisbury (1st creation) forfeit, 1322
William Scrope; 1350–1399; Earl of Wiltshire
Earldom of Wiltshire (2nd creation) forfeit, 1399
James Butler; 1393–1452; Earl of Ormond	Humphrey Stafford; 1402–1460; Duke of Buckingham, Earl of Stafford
Earl of Wiltshire (3rd creation), 1449	Earl of Wiltshire (4th creation), 1470
James Butler; 1420–1461; Earl of Ormond, Earl of Wiltshire	Thomas Butler; 1426–1515; Earl of Ormond	Humphrey Stafford c. 1425–1458	John Stafford; 1427–1473; 1st Earl of Wiltshire
Earldom of Wiltshire (3rd creation) forfeit, 1461
Margaret Butler c. 1454–1539	Henry Stafford; 1455–1483; Duke of Buckingham, Earl of Stafford	Edward Stafford; 1470–1499; 2nd Earl of Wiltshire
Earldom of Wiltshire (4th creation) extinct, 1499
Baron St John, 1539, Earl of Wiltshire (7th creation), 1550; Marquess of Winchester, 1551	Earl of Wiltshire (6th creation), 1529	Earl of Wiltshire (5th creation), 1510
William Paulet c. 1483/1485–1572; 1st Marquess of Winchester, etc.	Thomas Boleyn c. 1477–1539; Earl of Ormond, Earl of Wiltshire	Henry Stafford c. 1479–1523; Earl of Wiltshire
Earldom of Wiltshire (6th creation) extinct, 1539	Earldom of Wiltshire (5th creation) extinct, 1523
John Paulet c. 1510–1576; 2nd Marquess of Winchester, etc.	Anne Boleyn c. 1501–1536	King Henry VIII; 1491–1547
William Paulet c. 1532–1598; 3rd Marquess of Winchester, etc.	Queen Elizabeth I 1533–1603
William Paulet c. 1560–1628; 4th Marquess of Winchester, etc.
William Paulet c. 1587/1588–1621 styled Earl of Wiltshire	John Paulet c. 1598–1674; 5th Marquess of Winchester, etc.	Henry Paulet d. 1672
Duke of Bolton, 1689
Charles Paulet d. 1699; 1st Duke of Bolton, 6th Marquess of Winchester, etc.	Francis Paulet c. 1645–1695/1696
Charles Paulet; 1661–1722; 2nd Duke of Bolton, 7th Marquess of Winchester, etc.	Norton Paulet c. 1679–1741
Charles Powlett; 1685–1754; 3rd Duke of Bolton, 8th Marquess of Winchester, etc.	Harry Powlett; 1691–1759; 4th Duke of Bolton, 9th Marquess of Winchester, etc.
Charles Powlett d. 1765; 5th Duke of Bolton, 10th Marquess of Winchester, etc.	Harry Powlett; 1720–1794; 6th Duke of Bolton, 11th Marquess of Winchester, etc.	George Paulet; 1722–1800; 12th Marquess of Winchester, etc.
Dukedom of Bolton extinct
Charles Ingoldsby Paulet; 1765–1843; 13th Marquess of Winchester, etc.
John Paulet; 1801–1887; 14th Marquess of Winchester, etc.	Lord Charles Paulet; 1802–1870
Augustus John Henry Beaumont Paulet; 1858–1899; 15th Marquess of Winchester, etc.	Henry William Montague Paulet; 1862–1962; 16th Marquess of Winchester, etc.	Charles William Paulet; 1832–1897
Charles Standish Paulet; 1873–1953	Cecil Henry Paulet; 1875–1916
Richard Charles Paulet; 1905–1968; 17th Marquess of Winchester, etc.	George Cecil Paulet; 1905–1961
Nigel George Paulet; 1941–2016; 18th Marquess of Winchester, etc.
Christopher John Hilton Paulet b. 1969; 19th Marquess of Winchester, etc.
Michael John Paulet b. 1999 styled Earl of Wiltshire; Heir apparent to the Marquessate

== See also ==
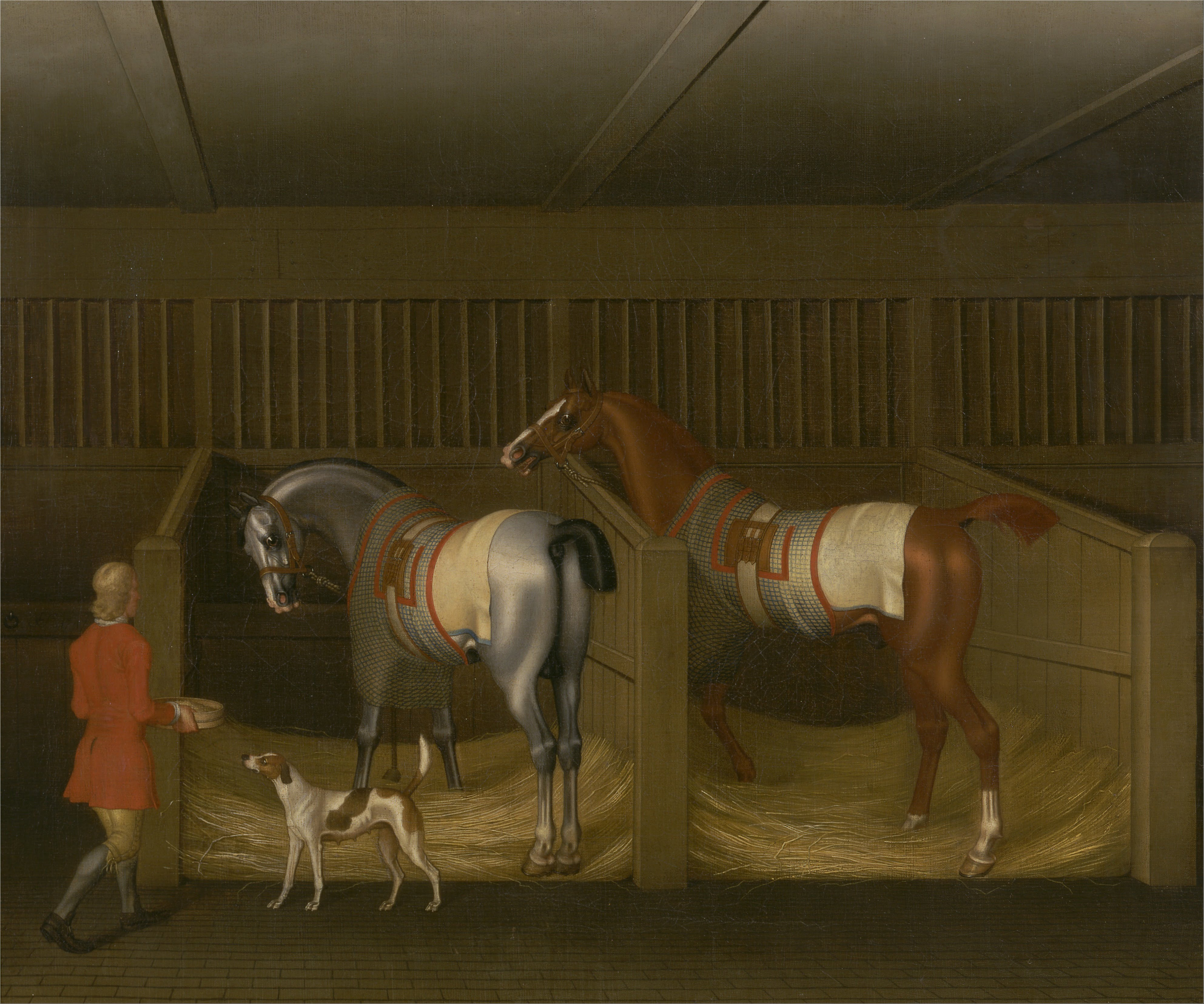
The Stables and Two Famous Running Horses belonging to His Grace, the Duke of Bolton, by James Seymour, 1747

- Baron Bolton
- Earl Poulett
- Earl of Winchester
- Paulet baronets
- Bapsybanoo Pavry
