= Richard Paulet, 17th Marquess of Winchester =

Marquess of Winchester (1905–1968)

Arms of Paulet

Richard Charles Paulet, 17th Marquess of Winchester (8 July 1905 – 5 March 1968), was an English peer.

He was born in London, the only son of Maj. Charles Standish Paulet MVO and Lillian Jane Charlotte Fosbery. His father was the grandson of Lord Charles Paulet, a younger son of the 13th Marquess. He was educated at Eton and served in the Royal Fusiliers.

He inherited the title from his cousin Henry Paulet, 16th Marquess of Winchester, in 1962.

He died unmarried in Dublin, and the title was passed to his cousin Nigel Paulet, 18th Marquess of Winchester.

Peerage of England
Preceded by Henry Paulet	Marquess of Winchester; 1962–1968	Succeeded by Nigel Paulet
