= William Jones (British Army officer) =

Welsh army officer (1808–1890)

General Sir William Jones GCB
- Born: 1808; Glen Helen, Caernarvonshire
- Died: 8 April 1890 (aged 81–82); Lansdown Lodge, Dublin
- Military career
- Allegiance: United Kingdom
- Branch: British Army
- Service years: 1825–1890
- Rank: General
- Commands: 1871–1881; Colonel of the 32nd (Cornwall) Regiment of Foot; 1881–1890; 1st Battalion, The Duke of Cornwall's Light Infantry
- Conflicts: Chillianwallah; Goojerat; Siege of Delhi; Indian Mutiny
- Awards: GCB

General Sir William Jones, GCB (1808 – 8 April 1890) was a Welsh soldier who was a senior officer in the British Army.

== Biography ==
Jones was born the only son of William Jones of Glen Helen, Caernarvonshire. Educated at Sandhurst Military Academy, he enlisted as an ensign in the 61st Regiment of Foot on 10 April 1825.

He rose through the ranks to lieutenant in December 1826, captain in November 1836, major in July 1844, lieutenant-colonel in December 1848, colonel in November 1854, major-general in April 1863, lieutenant-general in December 1871 and full general on 1 October 1877. He was with the 61st throughout the Punjaub campaign of 1848–49 and took part in the passage of the Chenab and the battles of Sadolapore, Chillianwallah and Goojerat during the Second Anglo-Sikh War of 1849. After Goojerat, in command of his regiment and a troop of Bengal horse artillery, he pursued the enemy to the Khyber Pass, for which he was made a C.B. and awarded a medal with two clasps.

During the Indian Mutiny Jones commanded the 3rd infantry brigade at the Siege of Delhi and was one of the five officers selected to lead the storming parties on 14 September 1857. When the assault was made he held command of both the first and second columns following the death from wounds of Brigadier-General Nicholson, and remained in charge during the six days of fighting in the streets.

On 2 June 1869 he was made a K.C.B., and on 29 May 1886 a G.C.B. From 2 January 1871 until 1881 he served as regimental colonel of the 32nd (Cornwall) Regiment of Foot. When that regiment amalgamated in 1881 with the 46th Regiment of Foot to form The Duke of Cornwall's Light Infantry, he became colonel of the 1st Battalion of the new regiment until his death.

He died at Lansdown Lodge, Lansdown Road, Dublin on 8 April 1890, and was buried in Mount Jerome cemetery. In 1857 he had married Elizabeth (died 12 November 1885), the second daughter of John Tuthill of Kilmore House, County Limerick.

Military offices
| Preceded by New regiment | Colonel of the 1st Battalion, The Duke of Cornwall's Light Infantry; 1881–1890 | Succeeded by John Thomas Hill |
| Preceded by Lord Frederick Paulet | Colonel of the 32nd (Cornwall) Regiment of Foot; 1871–1881 | Succeeded by Regiment amalgamated into Duke of Cornwall's Light Infantry |
