= John Paulet, 14th Marquess of Winchester =

The Most Honourable The Marquess of Winchester
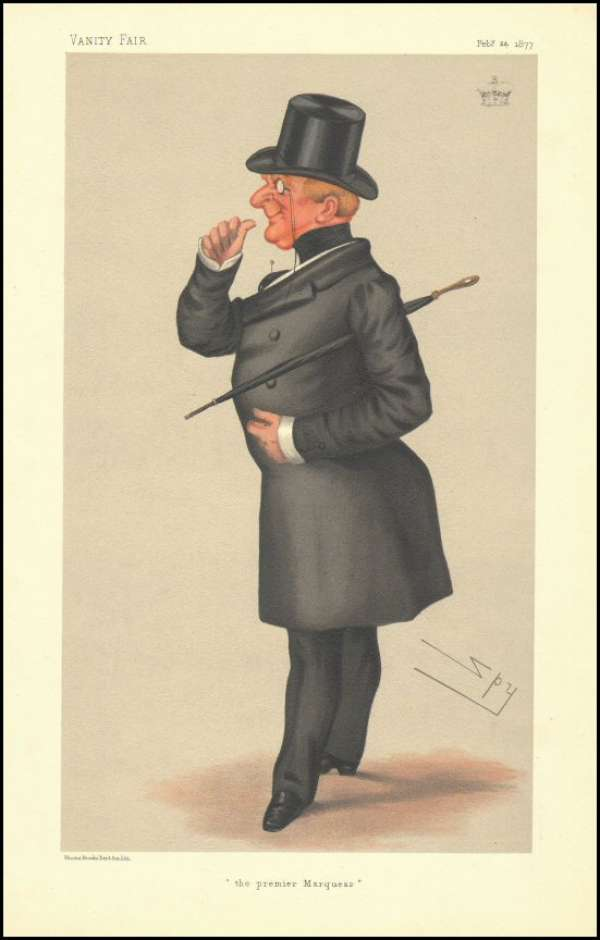
- "The premier marquess" Winchester as caricatured by Spy (Leslie Ward) in Vanity Fair, February 1877

Lord Lieutenant of Hampshire
- In office 1852–1887
- Preceded by: The Duke of Wellington
- Succeeded by: The Earl of Carnarvon

Personal details
- Born: John Paulet; 3 June 1801 Amport House
- Died: 4 July 1887 (aged 86)
- Spouse: Hon. Mary Montagu (after 1855)
- Children: Augustus Paulet, 15th Marquess of Winchester; Lady Lillian Wemyss; Henry Paulet, 16th Marquess of Winchester
- Parent(s): Charles Paulet, 13th Marquess of Winchester; Anne Andrews
- Education: Eton College

John Paulet, 14th Marquess of Winchester (3 June 1801 – 4 July 1887), styled Earl of Wiltshire until 1843, was a British peer and soldier.

== Early life ==
Born at Amport House in 1801 as the eldest son of Charles Paulet, 13th Marquess of Winchester and Anne Andrews (daughter of John Andrews of Shotley Hall). Among his siblings were Admiral Lord George Paulet, Field marshal Lord William Paulet, Lady Annabella Paulet (wife of Rear-Admiral William Ramsden), Lady Cecilia Paulet (wife of Sir Charles des Voeux, 2nd Baronet), and Lord Frederick Paulet (equerry to Princess Augusta, Duchess of Cambridge).

He was educated at Eton.

== Career ==
On 10 April 1817, he was commissioned a cornet in the 10th Light Dragoons, bought a lieutenancy on 16 November 1820, and a captaincy in the 35th Regiment of Foot on 12 June 1823. He exchanged into the 8th Hussars the same year. On 9 June 1826, he bought a majority in the regiment (Lord Brudenell, later Lord Cardigan, got his captaincy), and purchased an unattached lieutenant-colonelcy of infantry on 30 December 1826. On 14 April 1837, he exchanged from unattached half-pay to replace Lord Bingham (later Lord Lucan) as lieutenant-colonel of the 17th Lancers, and then retired from the Army the next day. On 29 June 1842, he was appointed colonel of the North Hampshire Militia after the death of Lord Rodney, much to the chagrin of the regimental lieutenant-colonel, Peter Hawker, who aspired to the post.

Paulet succeeded his father as Marquess of Winchester in 1843. He was appointed a deputy lieutenant of Hampshire on 31 March 1847, and succeeded the Duke of Wellington as Lord Lieutenant of Hampshire in 1852.

== Personal life ==
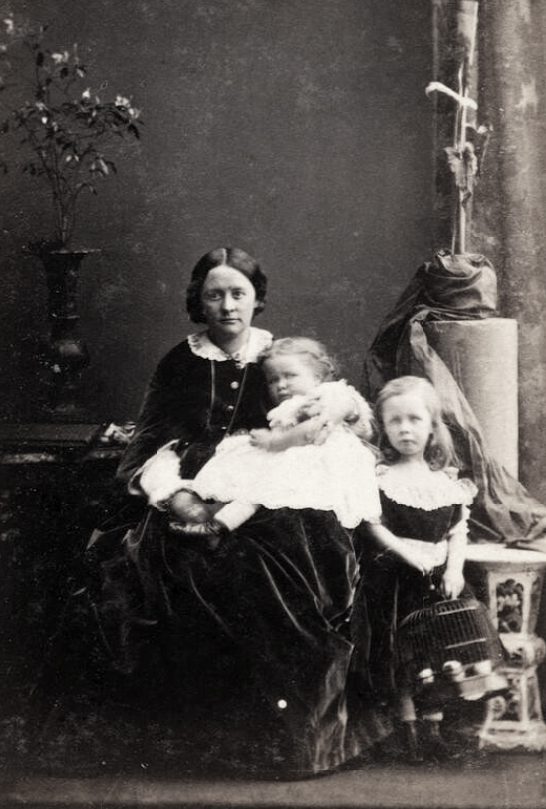
Mary, Marchioness of Winchester, 1861 portrait with two children

On 29 November 1855, Winchester married Hon. Mary Montagu (1828–1868), daughter of Henry Robinson-Montagu, 6th Baron Rokeby, at St James', Westminster. Together they had three children:

- Augustus John Henry Beaumont Paulet, 15th Marquess of Winchester (1858–1899), who was killed in the Second Boer War; he died unmarried.
- Lady Lillian Mary Paulet (1859–1952), who married, and divorced, Randolph Gordon Erskine-Wemyss, Laird of Wemyss Castle and Chief of Clan Wemyss.
- Henry William Montagu Paulet, 16th Marquess of Winchester (1862–1962), who married twice but died without issue.

He died on 4 July 1887 and was succeeded by his elder son, Augustus.

=== Descendants ===
Through his daughter Lady Lillian, he was a grandfather of Michael Erskine-Wemyss, who married Lady Victoria Cavendish-Bentinck (a daughter of William Cavendish-Bentinck, 6th Duke of Portland), and Mary Millicent Erskine-Wemyss, who married, as his first wife, Lt. Ernest Caswell Long of the Grenadier Guards.

Honorary titles
Preceded by The Duke of Wellington	Lord Lieutenant of Hampshire; 1852–1887	Succeeded by The Earl of Carnarvon
Peerage of England
Preceded by Charles Paulet	Marquess of Winchester; 1843–1887	Succeeded by Augustus Paulet
