= Amport House =

Country house in Amport, Hampshire, England

- Near Amport, Hampshire
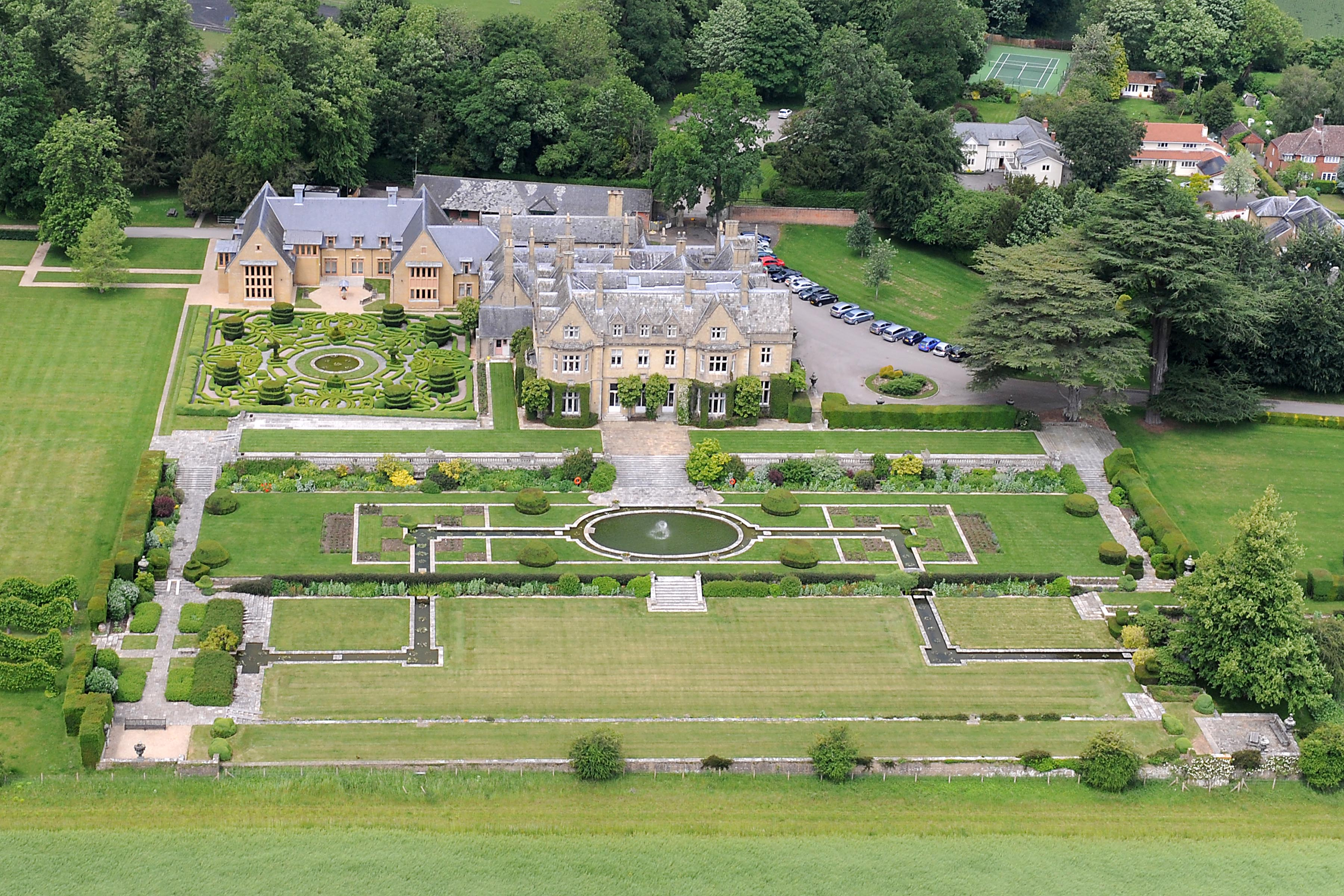
- Amport House

Site information
- Type: Manor house
- Owner: Ministry of Defence
- Controlled by: Ministry of Defence

Location
- Shown within Hampshire
- Location within Hampshire
- Coordinates: 51.1950°N 1.5761°W
- Grid reference: SU296440

Site history
- Built: 1857
- In use: 1939–2020

Garrison information
- Garrison: RAF Maintenance Command; Armed Forces Chaplaincy Centre

Amport House is a country house near the village of Amport, Andover, Hampshire, England. It is a Grade II listed building.

The house was built in 1857 by John Paulet, 14th Marquess of Winchester. After being requisitioned during the Second World War, the house had various military uses and was the home of the Armed Forces Chaplaincy Centre until March 2020, when it was sold by the Ministry of Defence.

== History ==
The first owner of the estate was Lord of the Manor of Amport William Paulet who was elevated to Marquis in 1551. The current house was built in 1857 in an Elizabethan style near the village of Amport by John Paulet, 14th Marquess of Winchester, replacing two earlier houses which had stood on the site. It has a gatehouse and a pleached avenue of lime trees, now believed to be the longest such avenue in the United Kingdom.

The last of the Paulet family to reside at Amport was Henry Paulet, 16th Marquess of Winchester. Facing high levels of taxation at the end of the First World War, he sold the estate in lots between November 1918 and July 1919. Not long afterwards, the house and grounds were bought by Colonel Sofer Whitburn DSO, who in 1923 engaged Sir Edwin Lutyens and Gertrude Jekyll to redesign the gardens.

At the start of the Second World War, the house was requisitioned to be used as the headquarters of Royal Air Force Maintenance Command; as well as ceding them use of the house, Sofer Whitburn is reported to have donated his entire wine cellar to the Officers' Mess as a patriotic gesture. In 1943, with the RAF still in possession, he sold the house; in 1957, the RAF itself bought the property. Later that year, the Royal Air Force Chaplains' School moved from Dowdeswell Court in Dowdeswell to Amport House. The School included a Royal Navy chaplain staff member, and in 1996, with the closure of the depot of the Royal Army Chaplains' Department at Bagshot Park, it became the tri-service Armed Forces Chaplaincy Centre.

In 1984, Amport House became a Grade II listed building.

In September 2016, the Ministry of Defence announced that Amport House would be put up for sale as part of a programme of defence estate rationalisation. A Better Defence Estate, published in November 2016, indicated that the Armed Forces Chaplaincy would close by 2020, which it subsequently did, to be relocated to Shrivenham, near Swindon. The licence for the publication of banns of marriage and the solemnisation of such marriages which had been granted to the chapel in January 2000 in accordance with the Marriage Act 1949 was cancelled in July 2020.

A converted stable block at the house was for some years the home of the Royal Army Chaplains' Museum, which also moved to Shrivenham.

In 2021, plans were announced to convert Amport House into an hotel.

== See also ==
- Royal Air Force Chaplains Branch
- Bishop to the Forces (Anglican)
- Bishopric of the Forces (Roman Catholic)
- Military chaplain: United Kingdom
- International Military Chiefs of Chaplains Conference
- Religion in the United Kingdom
