= Lord Lieutenant of Hampshire =

Position

This is a list of people who have served as Lord Lieutenant of Hampshire. Since 1688, all the Lords Lieutenant have also been Custos Rotulorum of Hampshire. From 1889 until 1959, the administrative county was named the County of Southampton.

- William Paulet, 1st Marquess of Winchester 1551–?
- William Paulet, 3rd Marquess of Winchester bef. 1585 – 24 November 1598 jointly with
- Henry Radclyffe, 4th Earl of Sussex 3 July 1585 – 14 December 1593
- Charles Blount, 1st Earl of Devonshire 4 August 1595 – 3 April 1606 jointly with
- George Carey, 2nd Baron Hunsdon 29 October 1597 – 8 September 1603 and
- Henry Wriothesley, 3rd Earl of Southampton 10 April 1604 – 10 November 1624
- Edward Conway, 1st Viscount Conway 9 May 1625 – 3 January 1631
- Richard Weston, 1st Earl of Portland 8 February 1631 – 13 March 1635
- James Stewart, 1st Duke of Richmond 29 May 1635 – 1642 jointly with
- Jerome Weston, 2nd Earl of Portland 29 May 1635 – 1642 and
- Thomas Wriothesley, 4th Earl of Southampton 3 June 1641 – 1642
- Interregnum
- Thomas Wriothesley, 4th Earl of Southampton 24 September 1660 – 16 May 1667
- Charles Paulet, Lord St John 20 December 1667 – 1675
- Edward Noel, 1st Earl of Gainsborough 20 March 1676 – 24 December 1687 jointly with
- Wriothesley Noel, Viscount Campden 9 April 1684 – 24 December 1687
- James FitzJames, 1st Duke of Berwick 24 December 1687 – 4 April 1689
- Charles Paulet, 1st Duke of Bolton 4 April 1689 – 27 February 1699
- Charles Paulet, 2nd Duke of Bolton 11 June 1699 – 15 September 1710
- Henry Somerset, 2nd Duke of Beaufort 15 September 1710 – 24 May 1714
- Charles Paulet, 2nd Duke of Bolton 5 August 1714 – 21 January 1722
- Charles Paulet, 3rd Duke of Bolton 8 February 1722 – 3 September 1733
- John Wallop, 1st Earl of Portsmouth 3 September 1733 – 19 July 1742
- Charles Powlett, 3rd Duke of Bolton 19 July 1742 – 26 August 1754
- Harry Powlett, 4th Duke of Bolton 13 November 1754 – 25 October 1758
- Charles Powlett, 5th Duke of Bolton 25 October 1758 – 15 June 1763
- James Brydges, Marquess of Carnarvon 15 June 1763 – 20 August 1764
- Robert Henley, 1st Earl of Northington 20 August 1764 – 6 February 1771
- James Brydges, 3rd Duke of Chandos 6 February 1771 – 10 May 1780
- George Pitt, 1st Baron Rivers 10 May 1780 – 15 April 1782
- Harry Powlett, 6th Duke of Bolton 15 April 1782 – 5 April 1793
- In commission: 1793–1798
  - George Paulet, 12th Marquess of Winchester
  - Sir William Heathcote, 3rd Baronet
  - William John Chute
- Charles Paulet, Earl of Wiltshire 3 March 1798 – 1 March 1800
- Thomas Orde-Powlett, 1st Baron Bolton 1 March 1800 – 30 July 1807
- James Harris, 1st Earl of Malmesbury 22 August 1807 – 21 November 1820
- Arthur Wellesley, 1st Duke of Wellington 27 December 1820 – 1 September 1852
- John Paulet, 14th Marquess of Winchester 27 October 1852 – 4 July 1887
- Henry Herbert, 4th Earl of Carnarvon 6 August 1887 – 29 June 1890
- Thomas Baring, 1st Earl of Northbrook 7 November 1890 – 15 November 1904
- Henry Paulet, 16th Marquess of Winchester 21 December 1904 – 24 January 1918
- John Edward Bernard Seely, 1st Baron Mottistone 24 January 1918 – 7 November 1947
- Wyndham Portal, 1st Viscount Portal 12 December 1947 – 6 May 1949
- Gerald Wellesley, 7th Duke of Wellington 9 September 1949 – 19 September 1960
- Alexander Baring, 6th Baron Ashburton 19 September 1960 – 1973
- William Harris, 6th Earl of Malmesbury 16 April 1973 – 1982
- Lt. Col. Sir James Walter Scott, 2nd Baronet 17 December 1982 – 2 November 1993
- Dame Mary Fagan 28 March 1994 – 11 September 2014
- Nigel Atkinson 11 September 2014 – Present

== Deputy Lieutenants ==
A deputy lieutenant of Hampshire is commissioned by the Lord Lieutenant of Hampshire. Deputy lieutenants support the work of the lord-lieutenant. There can be several deputy lieutenants at any time, depending on the population of the county. Their appointment does not terminate with the changing of the lord-lieutenant, but they usually retire at age 75.

=== 19th Century ===
- 31 March 1847: John Paulet, 14th Marquess of Winchester
- 31 March 1847: Lancelot Archer Burton
- 31 March 1847: Horatio Francis Kingsford Holloway
- 31 March 1847: Thomas Robbins
- 13 March 1891: John Carpenter Garnier
- 13 March 1891: Henry Wellesley, 3rd Duke of Wellington
- 13 March 1891: Augustus Paulet, 15th Marquess of Winchester
- 13 March 1891: George Carnegie, 9th Earl of Northesk
- 13 March 1891: Edward Harris, 4th Earl of Malmesbury
- 13 March 1891: Newton Wallop, Viscount Lymington
- 13 March 1891: Francis Baring, Viscount Baring
- 13 March 1891: Francis Baring, 5th Baron Ashburton
- 13 March 1891: Henry Douglas-Scott-Montagu, 1st Baron Montagu of Beaulieu
- 13 March 1891: George Sclater-Booth, 1st Baron Basing
- 13 March 1891: John Jervis Carnegie
- 13 March 1891: Evelyn Ashley,
- 13 March 1891: Sir Nelson Rycroft}
- 13 March 1891: Lieutenant General Sir Frederick Fitzwygram
- 13 March 1891: Sir William David King
- 13 March 1891: Sir Steuart Macnaghten
- 13 March 1891: Colonel Edward Bance
- 13 March 1891: William Beach
- 13 March 1891: Lieutenant Colonel George Birch
- 13 March 1891: Lieutenant Colonel Philip Wyndham
- 13 March 1891: John Bonham-Carter
- 13 March 1891: Chaloner William Chute
- 13 March 1891: Francis Compton
- 13 March 1891: Frederick Dalgety
- 13 March 1891: William Deverell
- 13 March 1891: Admiral Edward Field
- 13 March 1891: Francis FitzRoy
- 13 March 1891: Francis Jervoise
- 13 March 1891: Captain Hugh Hammersley
- 13 March 1891: William Kingsmill
- 13 March 1891: Montagu Knight
- 13 March 1891: Walter Long
- 13 March 1891: John Mills
- 13 March 1891: John Morant
- 13 March 1891: William Graham Nicholson
- 13 March 1891: Sir Wyndham Portal
- 13 March 1891: William Barrow Simonds
- 13 March 1891: William Wickham

=== 20th century ===
- 17 September 1962: Anthony Hill
