= Amport =

Village and parish in Hampshire, England

Coordinates: 51°11′49″N 1°34′15″W

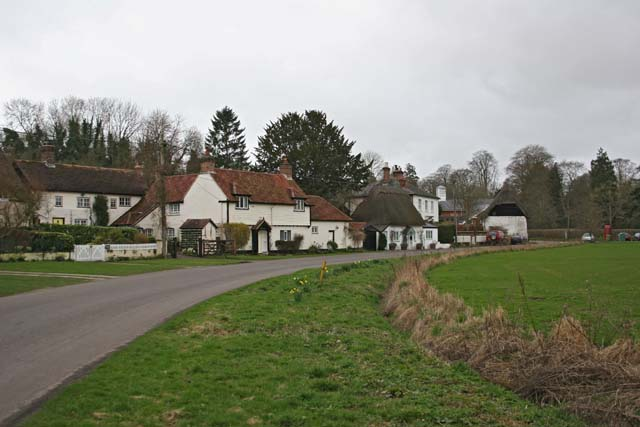

- Location within Hampshire
- Population: 1,189 (2011 Census)
- OS grid reference: SU 30501 44359
- Civil parish: Amport
- District: Test Valley
- Shire county: Hampshire
- Region: South East
- Country: England
- Sovereign state: United Kingdom
- Post town: ANDOVER
- Postcode district: SP11
- Dialling code: 01264
- Police: Hampshire and Isle of Wight
- Fire: Hampshire and Isle of Wight
- Ambulance: South Central

Amport is a village and civil parish in the Test Valley district of Hampshire, England, a few miles west of Andover. It incorporates the small hamlet of East Cholderton and has a population of about 1,200.

There is a village green is surrounded by thatched cottages. The village lies in the valley of the Pillhill Brook, a tributary of the River Anton and thence the River Test, a chalk stream famous for its trout-fishing, and for those who enjoy a country walk, there are many attractive routes.

== History ==
The village takes its name from the river Ann (shortened to Am) and the medieval landowner of the village Hugh de Port, recorded in the Domesday Book.

In November 1830, the village was the site of a small industrial riot when local labourers destroyed machinery and demanded wage increases.

== Landmarks ==
Amport House on the outskirts of the village occupied was originally home to the Marquesses of Winchester. The first Marquis was Lord of the Manor of Amport William Paulet who was elevated to Marquis in 1551. The Manor house was rebuilt on the site of an Earlier Elizabethan mansion destroyed by fire and was the Headquarters of RAF Maintenance Command from 1939 until 1960. The house has gardens designed by celebrated architect, Edwin Lutyens and laid out by Gertrude Jekyll. The House is now a hotel but was previously home to the Royal Army Chaplains' Department in the 1970s and The Museum of Army Chaplaincy.

Amport's greatest attraction, however, is the world-renowned Hawk Conservancy Trust, where skilled falconers daily fly a wide variety of hawks, owls and eagles, including two American bald eagles.

== Religious sites ==
The church, St Mary's, which was built in the fourteenth century, has a peal of six bells which are rung regularly. There is a church school, founded by a lady benefactor, Mrs Sophia Sheppard, the widow of Rev. Thomas Sheppard, in the early nineteenth century.

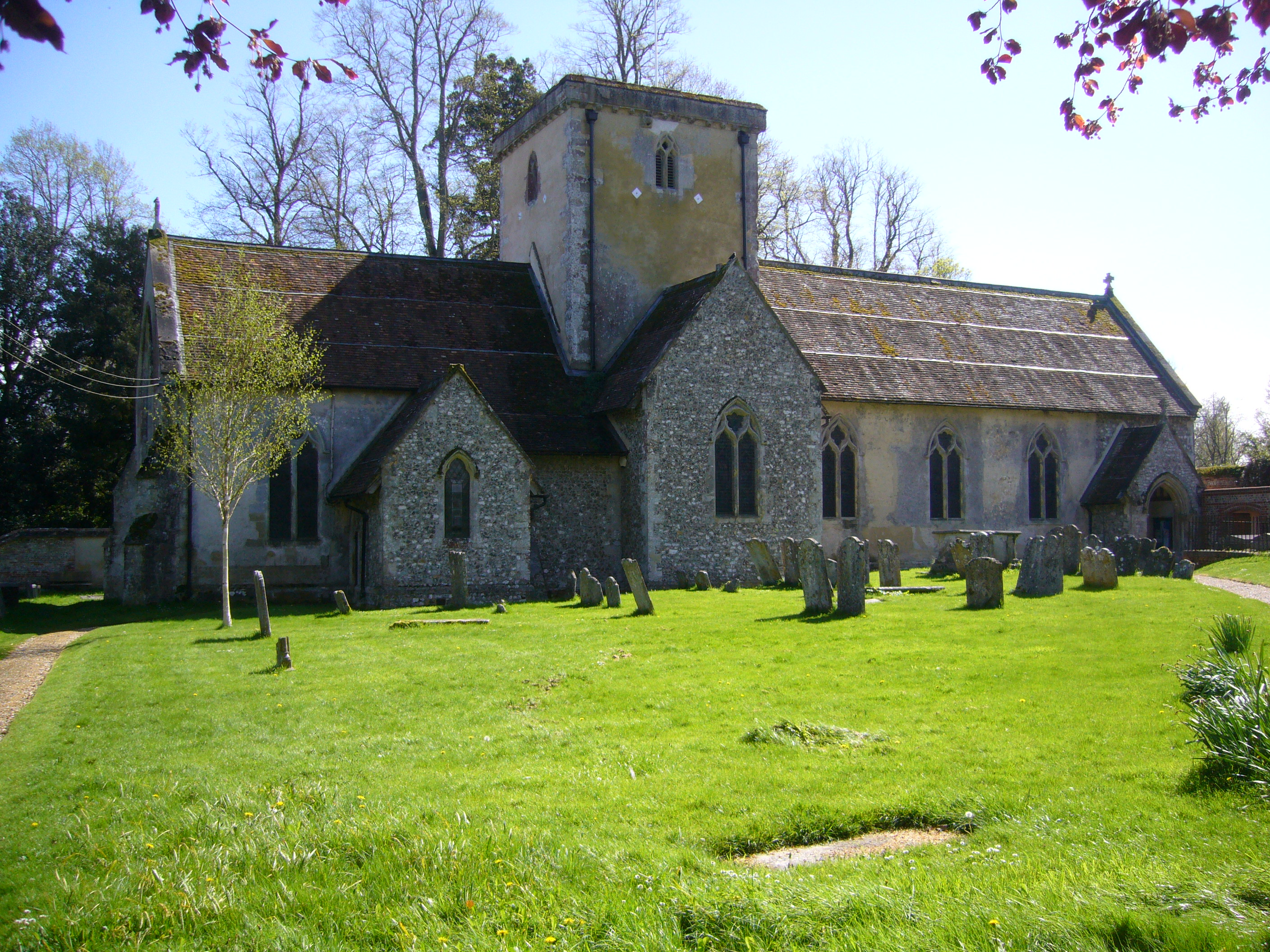
Amport Parish Church April 2014

== Education ==
=== State ===
Primary:

- Amport CE (Aided) Primary School

== Notable people ==
- Walter Davis (1847 – 1930), the Victorian plant collector was born in Amport, and started his career at Amport House.
