= Alexander Thistlethwayte =

Alexander Thistlethwayte (1636–1716) of Winterslow, Wiltshire was the member of the Parliament of England for Salisbury for the parliaments of March and October 1679, and 1681.
