= Charles Powlett, 5th Duke of Bolton =

British soldier, nobleman and Whig politician

Lieutenant-General His Grace The Duke of Bolton
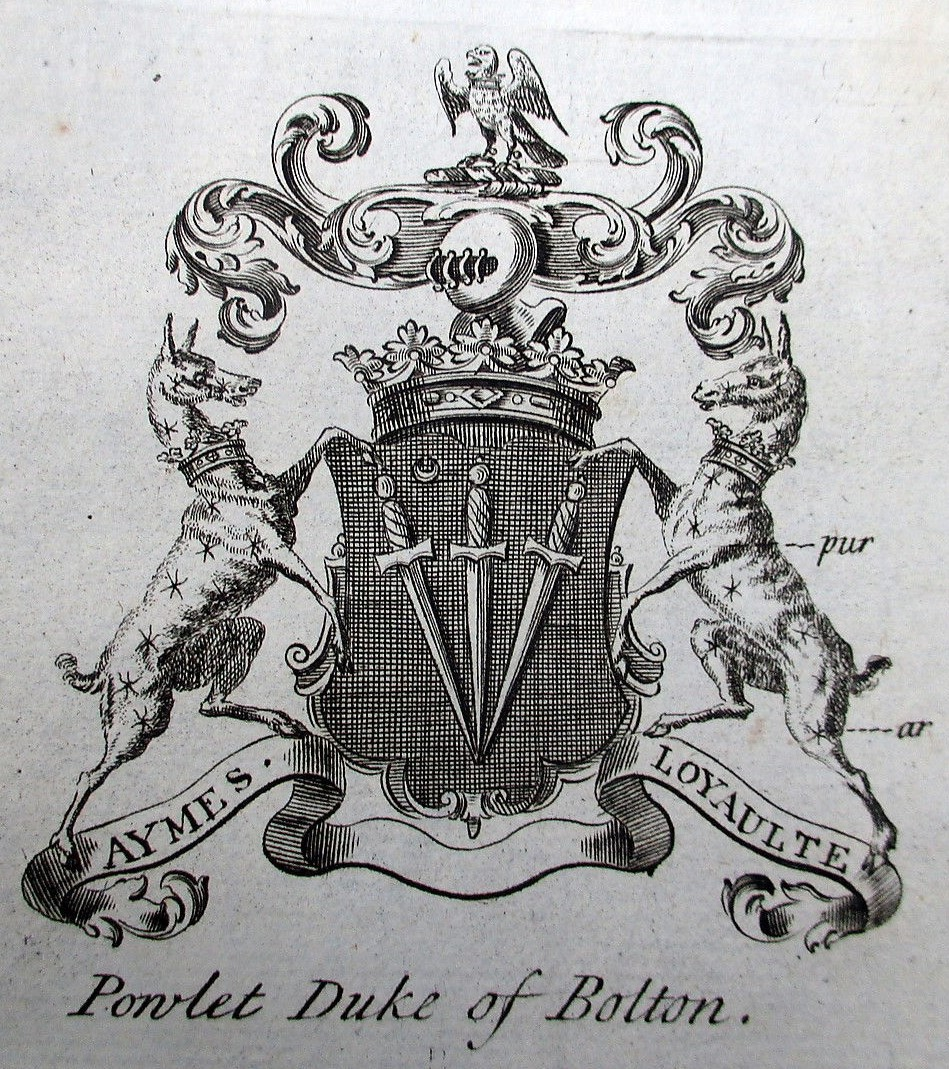
- Coat of arms
- Tenure: 9 October 1759 – 5 July 1765
- Predecessor: Harry Powlett, 4th Duke of Bolton
- Successor: Harry Powlett, 6th Duke of Bolton
- Other titles: Marquess of Winchester; Earl of Wiltshire
- Born: c. 1718
- Died: 5 July 1765 (aged 46–47); Grosvenor Square, London
- Issue: Jean Mary Browne-Powlett (illegitimate)
- Father: Harry Powlett, 4th Duke of Bolton
- Mother: Catherine Parry
- Occupation: Soldier, nobleman, politician

Member of the Great Britain Parliament for Hampshire
- In office 1754–1759 Serving with Alexander Thistlethwayte
- Preceded by: Lord Harry Powlett
- Succeeded by: Henry Bilson-Legge

Member of the Great Britain Parliament for Lymington
- In office 1741–1754 Serving with Sir Harry Burrard
- Preceded by: Lord Nassau Powlett
- Succeeded by: Adam Drummond

Lieutenant-General Charles Powlett, 5th Duke of Bolton (c. 1718 – 5 July 1765), styled Marquess of Winchester from 1754 to 1759, was a British soldier, nobleman and Whig politician.

== Early life ==
He was the eldest son of Harry Powlett, 4th Duke of Bolton and Catherine Parry.

== Career ==
Educated at Winchester, he joined the British Army and became a lieutenant-colonel in 1745. Powlett was a Groom of the Bedchamber to Frederick, Prince of Wales from 1749 until the Prince's death in 1751. He had been promoted lieutenant general by 12 March 1752, when he was made a KB.

Upon the succession of his father to the Dukedom in December 1754, he became known as Marquess of Winchester, and he left his seat at Lymington to succeed his father in Hampshire. He would remain member for that county until his succession as Duke of Bolton in 1759. On 22 December 1758, he was sworn of the Privy Council.

As Lord Lieutenant of Hampshire he had the responsibility for reforming the Hampshire Militia during the Seven Years' War. He took personal command of the North Hampshire Militia as Colonel, but when he tried to exercise direct command over the South Regiment as well, he was fiercely opposed. Under a compromise he was made 'Brigadier-General of Militia for the County of Southampton', with general command over both independent regiments.

== Personal life ==
Lord Bolton never married, however, he had a child with Mary Browne Banks:

- Jean Mary Browne-Powlett (c. 1751–1814), who married Thomas Orde in 1778.

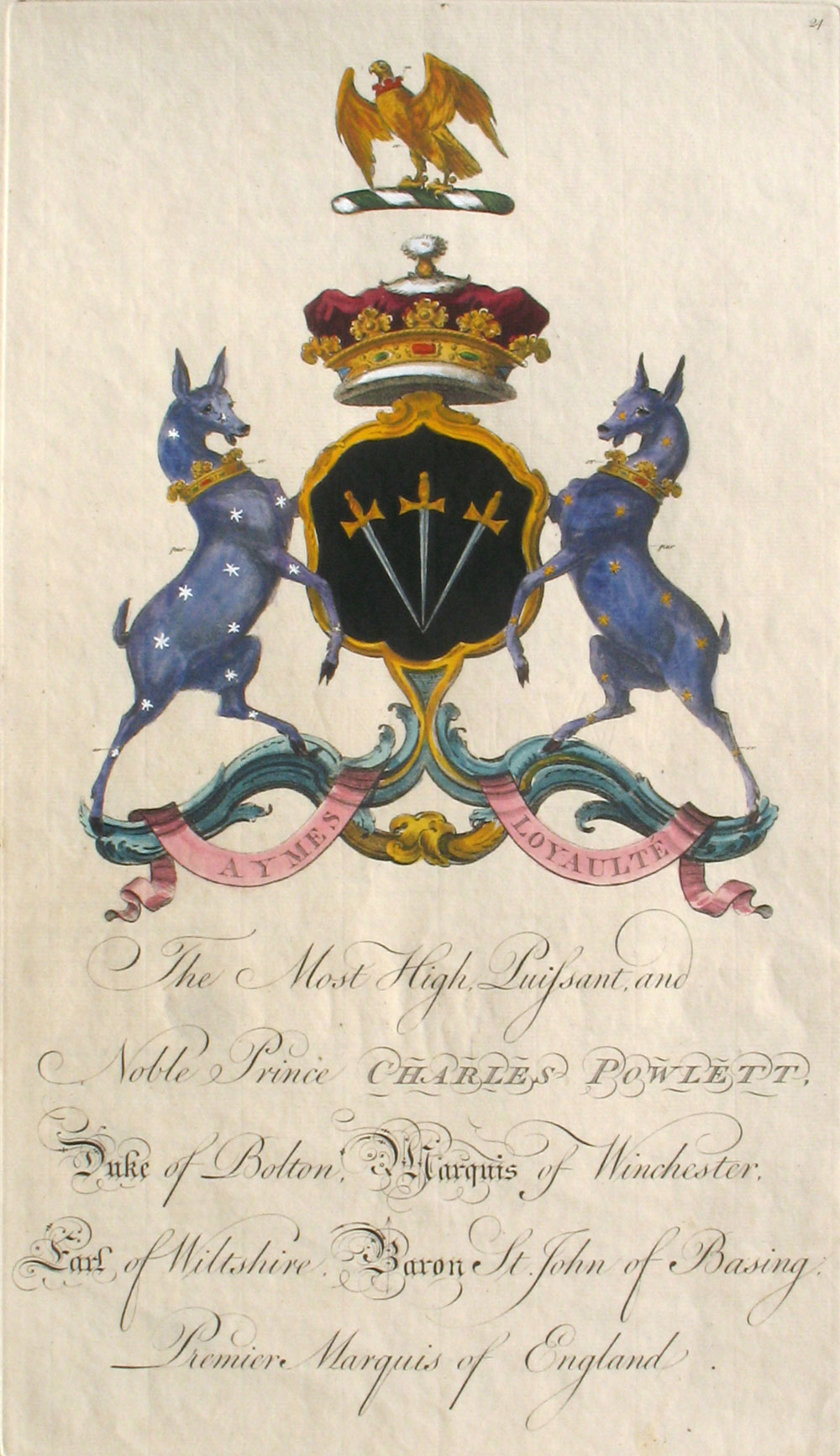
Coat of arms of Charles Powlett, 5th Duke of Bolton.

On 5 July 1765, Bolton died by suicide – shooting himself in the head with a pistol in his house in Grosvenor Square; "nobody knows why or wherefore," wrote Horace Walpole, "except that there is a good deal of madness in the blood". Unmarried, Lord Bolton entailed most of his extensive estates to his illegitimate daughter, Jean Mary Browne-Powlett, in default of male issue of his younger brother Harry. When Harry died without male heirs in 1794, the Dukedom became extinct, and the inheritance passed to Thomas Orde in right of his wife. He added Powlett to his surname and was created Baron Bolton in 1797. The properties with attached farms included Bolton Hall and Bolton Castle in North Yorkshire and Hackwood Park, Old Basing, Hampshire.

== Grosvenor Square ==
Lord Nassau Powlett, son of 2nd Duke of Bolton, had No 24 (formerly no 21), 1735–38, and the 3rd duke, and then his widow, had No 1, 1753–55. The 5th duke had No. 37 (formerly no 32) from 1759–65. For him it was extensively altered c. 1761–5 by John Vardy, (demolished in 1934). Following the 5th duke Bolton the lease holders or occupiers were the 3rd Duke of Grafton, Prime Minister, 1765; 4th Earl of Tankerville, 1769–79; Baron Alvensleben, Hanoverian Minister, c. 1780–92; 6th Duke of Bolton, 'for tenants', c. 1793–5.

Parliament of Great Britain
Preceded by Lord Nassau Powlett; Sir Harry Burrard	Member of Parliament for Lymington; 1741–1754; With: Sir Harry Burrard	Succeeded by Sir Harry Burrard; Adam Drummond
Preceded by Lord Harry Powlett; Alexander Thistlethwayte	Member of Parliament for Hampshire; 1754–1759; With: Alexander Thistlethwayte	Succeeded by Alexander Thistlethwayte; Henry Bilson-Legge
Honorary titles
Preceded by The 4th Duke of Bolton	Lieutenant of the Tower of London; 1754–1760	Succeeded by George Paulet
Preceded by The 4th Duke of Bolton	Lord Lieutenant of Hampshire; 1758–1763	Succeeded by Marquess of Carnarvon
Preceded by The 4th Duke of Bolton	Vice-Admiral of Dorset and Hampshire; 1759–1765	Vacant Title next held by The 6th Duke of Bolton
Peerage of England
Preceded by Harry Powlett	Duke of Bolton; 1759–1765	Succeeded by Harry Powlett
