= Lord Frederick Paulet =

British Army general

Lieutenant-General Lord Frederick Paulet CB
- Born: 12 May 1810
- Died: 1 January 1871 (aged 60)
- Military career
- Allegiance: United Kingdom
- Branch: British Army
- Rank: Lieutenant-General
- Commands: Brigade of Guards
- Conflicts: Crimean War
- Awards: Companion of the Order of the Bath

Lieutenant-General Lord Frederick Paulet, CB (12 May 1810 – 1 January 1871) was a senior British Army officer.

== Military career ==
Born the fifth son of the Marquess of Winchester, Paulet was commissioned into the Coldstream Guards. He served in the Crimean War and fought at the Battle of Alma, the Battle of Balaklava and the Battle of Inkerman as well as the Siege of Sevastopol.

In 1858, he attended the marriage of Princess Victoria and Prince Frederick in his capacity as The Field Officer in Brigade Waiting. He became Major General commanding the Brigade of Guards in 1863. His last role was as Comptroller and Equerry to the Duchess of Cambridge, a role he was appointed to in 1867.

He also became Colonel of the 32nd Regiment of Foot in 1868. He was promoted to lieutenant general in 1870, and died unmarried in 1871.

Military offices
Preceded by James Craufurd	Major-General commanding the Brigade of Guards; 1863–1867	Succeeded by Sir James Lindsay
Preceded by Sir George Bell	Colonel of the 32nd (Cornwall) Regiment of Foot; 1868–1871	Succeeded by Sir William Jones
Court offices
Preceded by Arthur Richard Wellesley	Page of Honour; 1821–1826	Succeeded by William Hervey-Bathurst
