= Henry Paulet, 16th Marquess of Winchester =

British peer (1862-1962)

The Most Honourable The Marquess of Winchester
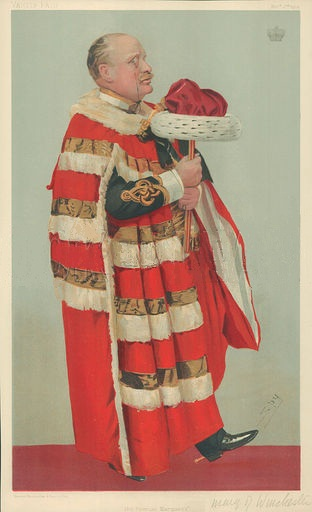
- "Premier Marquess", caricature of Winchester from Vanity Fair magazine, 3 November 1904

Lord Lieutenant of Hampshire
- In office 15 November 1904 – 24 January 1918
- Preceded by: The Earl of Northbrook
- Succeeded by: J. E. B. Seely

Member of the House of Lords
- Lord Temporal
- Hereditary peerage 12 December 1899 – 28 June 1962
- Preceded by: The 15th Marquess of Winchester
- Succeeded by: The 17th Marquess of Winchester

Personal details
- Born: Lord Henry William Montagu Paulet; 30 October 1862 Mayfair, London
- Died: 28 June 1962 (aged 99) Monte Carlo, Monaco

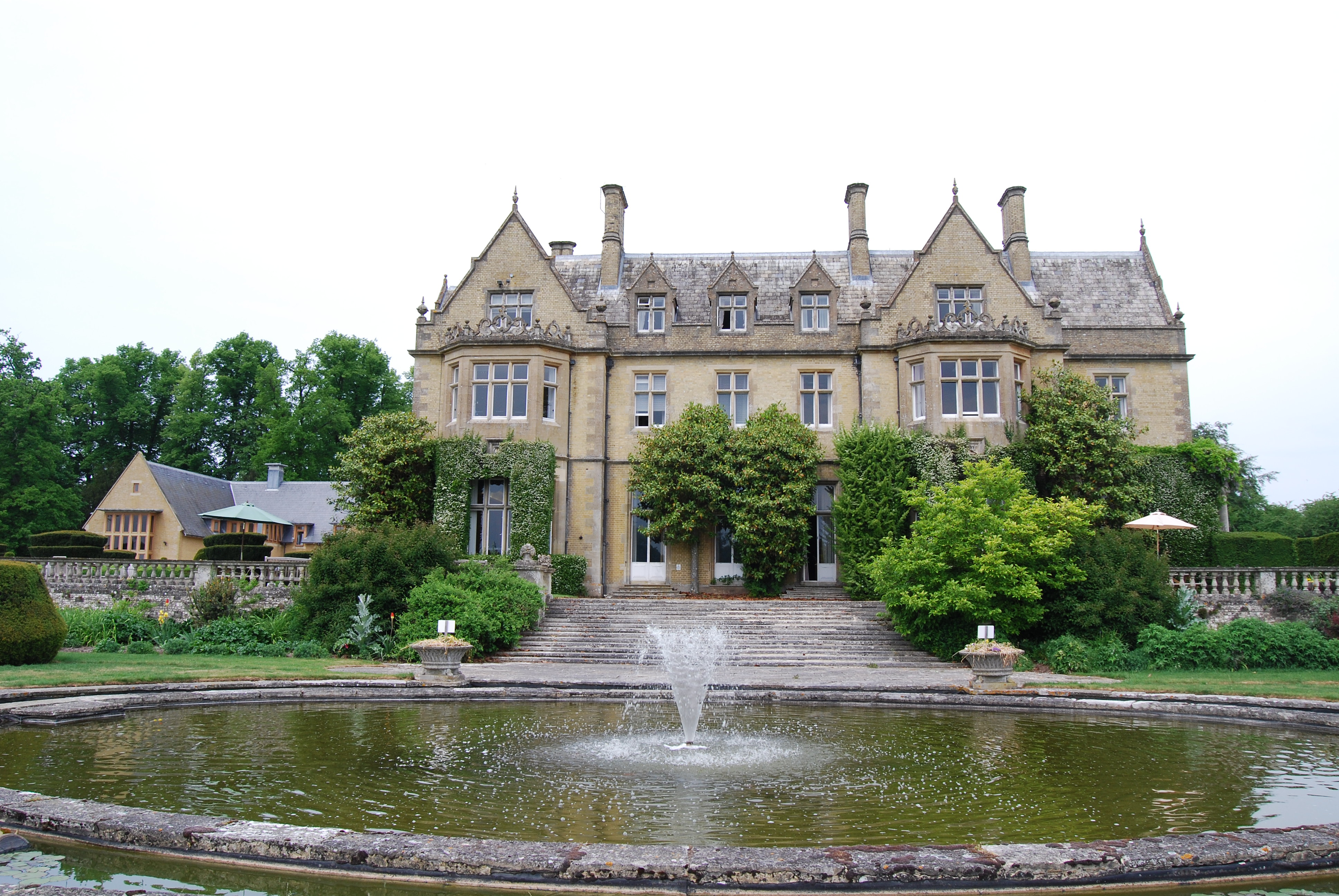
Amport House, the principal family seat

Henry William Montagu Paulet, 16th Marquess of Winchester (30 October 1862 – 28 June 1962), known as Lord Henry Paulet until 1899, was an English peer, landowner, soldier, sportsman, politician and businessman.

After a youth spent largely in travelling and hunting, he became Lord Lieutenant of Hampshire and Chairman of Hampshire County Council, then served in the Hampshire Regiment and the Rifle Brigade during the First World War. In the 1920s he was associated in business with Clarence Hatry, which led to his bankruptcy in 1930. When he died in Monte Carlo at the age of 99 he was the oldest-ever member of the House of Lords.

== Early life ==
Paulet was born at 16, Grafton Street, Mayfair, the third child and second son of the 14th Marquess by his marriage to Hon. Mary Montagu, a daughter of Henry Montagu, 6th Baron Rokeby. His mother died suddenly, age 40, when he was 5. He had an elder brother, Augustus, Earl of Wiltshire (later the 15th Marquess of Winchester, 1858–1899), and elder sister, Lady Lilian Mary (1859–1952), who married Randolph Wemyss.

He was educated at Burney's Royal Naval Academy, Gosport, before travelling widely, hunting big game in the Rocky Mountains and visiting India, Ceylon, China and Japan. In 1891, he went to South Africa, where he became a friend and hunting companion of Cecil Rhodes.

=== Peerage ===
Paulet inherited the family titles and estates in 1899 on the death of his older brother, the 15th Marquess, who was killed in action at the Battle of Magersfontein during the Boer War.

As Paulet had no children, after his death in 1962, the title passed to Richard Charles Paulet, his first cousin twice removed through Charles Paulet, 13th Marquess of Winchester. His stake in the family's settled land was probated at £56,100 (equivalent to about £1,000,000 in 2023) plus a fraction of that including other assets in three grants in 1963.

== Career ==
Paulet was Lord Lieutenant of Hampshire and Custos Rotulorum from 1904 to 1917, Chairman of Hampshire County Council from 1904 to 1909, and President of the Territorial Association from 1909 to 1917.

Lord Winchester was commissioned a second lieutenant in the Yeomanry regiment Hampshire Carabiniers on 16 January 1901, and was promoted to captain on 6 December 1902. During the First World War, Winchester was re-commissioned as a Lieutenant into the 3rd (Reserve) Battalion, Hampshire Regiment, and was later a captain in the Hampshire Carabiniers and a Major in the 13th (Service) Battalion, Rifle Brigade. He served in the British Expeditionary Force in France from 1915 to 1917.

During the 1920s, he entered the world of business in association with Clarence Hatry and became a director of several of Hatry's companies. On 20 September 1929, the London Stock Exchange suspended all shares of the Hatry group, and Hatry confessed to fraud and forgery. Nine days later, the Wall Street crash began. In April 1930, in the High Court, a firm of stockbrokers succeeded in making Winchester personally liable to pay them £2,996, plus their legal costs, in connection with shares he had bought "on behalf of Austin Friars Trust", a Hatry company. However, in finding for the plaintiffs, the judge, Mr Justice Hawke, described Winchester as a "person of honesty and integrity" who was doubtless speaking what he believed to be the truth. On 8 November 1930, Winchester was declared bankrupt, and subsequently spent most of the rest of his life abroad. In 1932, he was discharged from bankruptcy. He was joint managing director of the City of London Electric Lighting Company from 1915 to 1928.

In England, he had lived at Amport House near Andover, at Denton Hall in Northumberland that he inherited from his mother, who was the second daughter and co-heiress to Henry Robinson-Montagu, 6th Baron Rokeby and at 1, Portland Place, Westminster. During the Second World War, Amport House was taken over by RAF Maintenance Command. Winchester died in Monte Carlo on 28 June 1962 at the age of ninety-nine.

For more than a year he had been the oldest ever member of the House of Lords, having surpassed the record previously held by Hardinge Giffard, 1st Earl of Halsbury (1823–1921).

== Marriages ==
In 1892, Lord Henry Paulet married Charlotte Howard, a daughter of Col. John Stanley Howard of Ballina Park, County Wicklow, and the widow of Samuel Garnett of Arch Hall, County Meath.

After her death in 1924, and by now the Marquess of Winchester, he married Caroline, the widow of Major Claud Marks of the Highland Light Infantry; she died in 1949.

In 1952, he married Bapsy Pavry MA, a daughter of the Most Rev. Khurshedji Pavry, High Priest in India of the Parsees. They subsequently separated and the Marquess joined a former fiancée Eve Fleming in Nassau. She cared for the elderly Paulet in Monte Carlo until his death in 1962. He had no surviving children.

Honorary titles
Preceded by Earl of Northbrook	Lord Lieutenant of Hampshire; 1904–1918	Succeeded by Lord Mottistone
Peerage of England
Preceded by Augustus Paulet	Marquess of Winchester; 1899–1962	Succeeded by Richard Charles Paulet
