= Augustus Paulet, 15th Marquess of Winchester =

British Army major and landowner (1858–1899)

- Marquess of Winchester
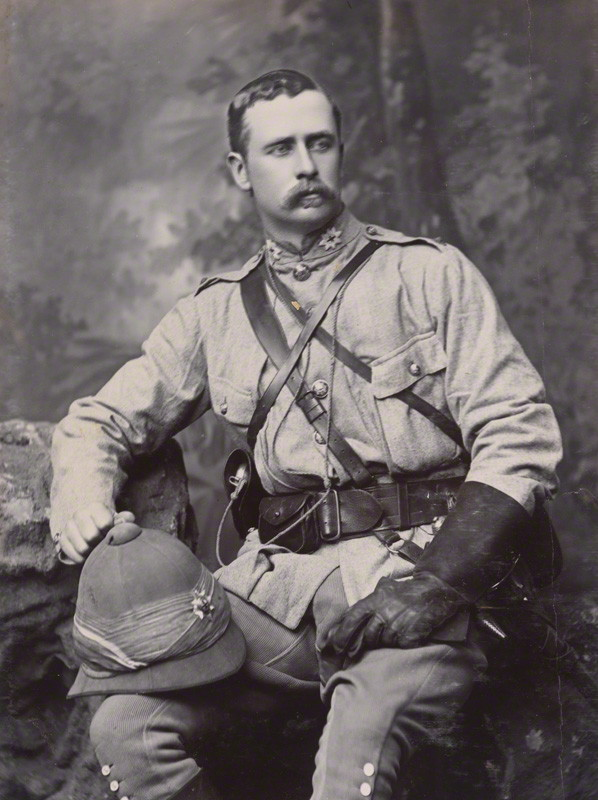
- Winchester in the 1890s
- Tenure: 1887–1899
- Predecessor: John Paulet, 14th Marquess of Winchester
- Successor: Henry Paulet, 16th Marquess of Winchester
- Full name: Augustus John Henry Beaumont Paulet
- Born: 6 February 1858
- Died: 11 December 1899 (aged 41); Magersfontein, South Africa
- Father: John Paulet, 14th Marquess of Winchester
- Mother: Mary Montagu
- Education: Eton College; King's College London

Augustus John Henry Beaumont Paulet, 15th Marquess of Winchester (6 February 1858 – 11 December 1899) was a British peer and soldier.

The son of John Paulet, 14th Marquess of Winchester and Mary Montagu, the daughter of Henry Montagu, 6th Baron Rokeby, he was educated at Eton College and King's College London. He succeeded his father to the peerage in 1887.

As Earl of Wiltshire he was commissioned as a Sub-Lieutenant and Lieutenant in the Hampshire Militia on 31 July 1873. He transferred to the Coldstream Guards on 27 September 1879 in which he rose to the rank of major. Lord Winchester served in the Second Boer War, and was killed at Magersfontein, South Africa on 11 December 1899, in a battle where the defending Boer force defeated the advancing British forces amongst heavy casualties for the latter. Lord Winchester was mentioned in the despatch from Lord Methuen describing the battle, as a man who "displayed almost reckless courage".

His remains were transferred back to England, and cremated at Brookwood in early February 1900, followed by a funeral service at Amport two days later.

Peerage of England
Preceded by John Paulet	Marquess of Winchester; 1887–1899	Succeeded by Henry Paulet
