= Thomas Orde-Powlett, 1st Baron Bolton =

English politician

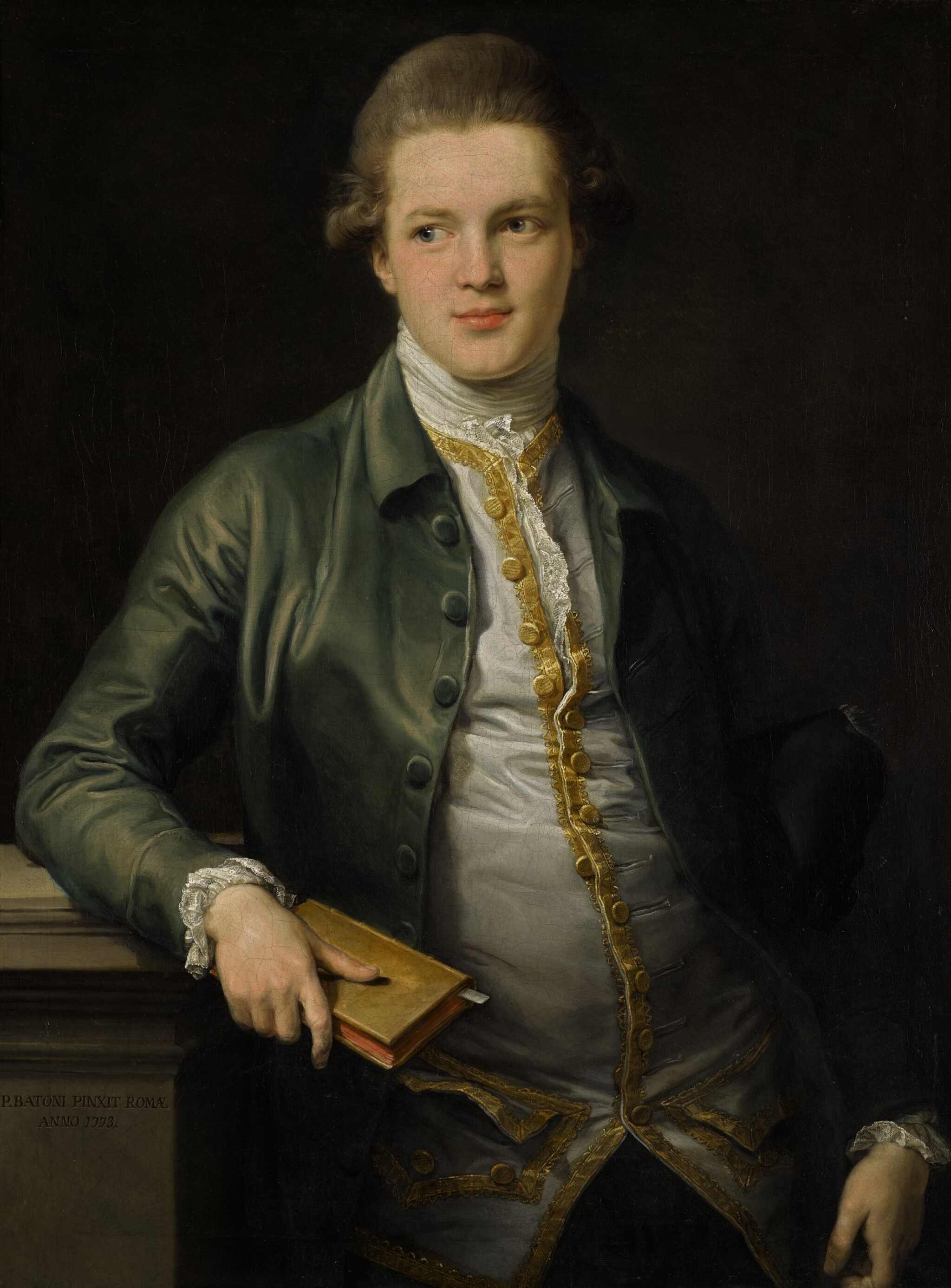
Portrait by Pompeo Batoni, 1773

Thomas Orde-Powlett, 1st Baron Bolton PC (30 August 1746 – 30 July 1807) was an English Tory politician. He was also an amateur etcher, and a cartoonist.

== Life ==
Born Thomas Orde, he was son of John Orde of Morpeth, Northumberland. He was educated at Eton and at King's College, Cambridge, graduating Master of Arts in 1773.

Orde entered politics as Tory Member of Parliament for Aylesbury (1780–1784) and later for Harwich (1784–1796). He served as Secretary to the Treasury (1782–1783) and as Chief Secretary for Ireland (1784–1787). Around 1782, he was appointed to the Privy Council of Ireland, and in 1785, to HM Privy Council. He was Governor of the Isle of Wight (1791–1807) and Lord Lieutenant of Hampshire (1800–1807).

On 7 January 1795, by Royal License, he assumed the additional surname of Powlett, and on 20 October 1797 he was created Baron Bolton. His younger brother John Orde was an Admiral in the Navy, and was created a Baronet, of Morpeth in the County of Northumberland, in 1790.

He died in 1807 and was succeeded by his eldest son William, the second Baron, who was MP for Yarmouth (IoW) for a short while.

The 2nd Baron of Bolton, married Hon. Maria Carleton daughter of Gen Guy Carleton, 1st Baron Dorchester. They had no children. He was succeeded in the Barony of Bolton in 1850 by William Henry Orde-Powlett, 3rd Baron Bolton. This was son of Hon. Thomas Powlett Orde-Powlett and Letitia O'Brien, daughter of Henry O'Brien. He married Letitia Crawfurd, daughter of Colonel Robert Crawfurd. They had issue.

== Family ==
On 7 April 1778 Orde married Jean Mary Browne-Powlett, the illegitimate daughter of Charles Powlett, 5th Duke of Bolton, who had entailed most of his extensive estates to her in default of male issue of his younger brother Harry Powlett, 6th Duke of Bolton. The latter died without male heirs in 1794, the Dukedom became extinct, and the said inheritance passed to Thomas Orde in right of his wife. The properties with attached farms included Bolton Hall and Bolton Castle in North Yorkshire and Hackwood Park, Old Basing, Hampshire.

Parliament of Great Britain
Preceded by Anthony Bacon; John Aubrey	Member of Parliament for Aylesbury; 1780–1784; With: Anthony Bacon	Succeeded by Sir Thomas Hallifax; William Wrightson
Preceded by John Robinson; George North	Member of Parliament for Harwich; 1784–1796; With: John Robinson	Succeeded by John Robinson; Richard Hopkins
Parliament of Ireland
Preceded by Sackville Hamilton; Charles Francis Sheridan	Member of Parliament for Rathcormack; 1784–1790; With: Charles Francis Sheridan	Succeeded by Henry Duquery; John Philpot Curran
Political offices
Preceded by Henry Strachey	Secretary to the Treasury (senior); 1782–1783	Succeeded by Richard Brinsley Sheridan
Preceded by Thomas Pelham	Chief Secretary for Ireland; 1784–1787	Succeeded by Alleyne FitzHerbert
Honorary titles
Preceded by Sir Richard Worsley	Vice-Admiral of the Isle of Wight; 1791–1807	Succeeded by Viscount FitzHarris
Preceded by The Duke of Bolton	Governor of the Isle of Wight; 1791–1807	Succeeded by Viscount FitzHarris
Preceded by Earl of Wiltshire	Lord Lieutenant of Hampshire; 1800–1807	Succeeded by The Earl of Malmesbury
Vacant Title last held by The Duke of Bolton	Vice-Admiral of Hampshire; 1803–1807	Succeeded by Viscount FitzHarris
Peerage of Great Britain
New creation	Baron Bolton; 1797–1807	Succeeded by William Orde-Powlett
