= William Scrope, 1st Earl of Wiltshire =

Earl of Wiltshire from 1397 to 1399, King of Mann from 1393 to 1399

William III of Mann
- Earl of Wiltshire
- Arms of William Scrope

King of Mann
- Reign: 3 June 1397 - 29 July 1399
- Predecessor: William de Montagu, 2nd Earl of Salisbury
- Successor: Henry Percy, 1st Earl of Northumberland
- Born: c. 1350
- Died: 29 July 1399; Bristol Castle
- Spouse: Isabel Russell (m. 1396)
- Father: Richard le Scrope, 1st Baron Scrope of Bolton

William le Scrope, Earl of Wiltshire, King of Mann KG (c. 1350 – 29 July 1399) was a close supporter of King Richard II of England. He was a second son of Richard le Scrope, 1st Baron Scrope of Bolton.

He was the third and final king of an independent Manx Kingdom.

== Life ==
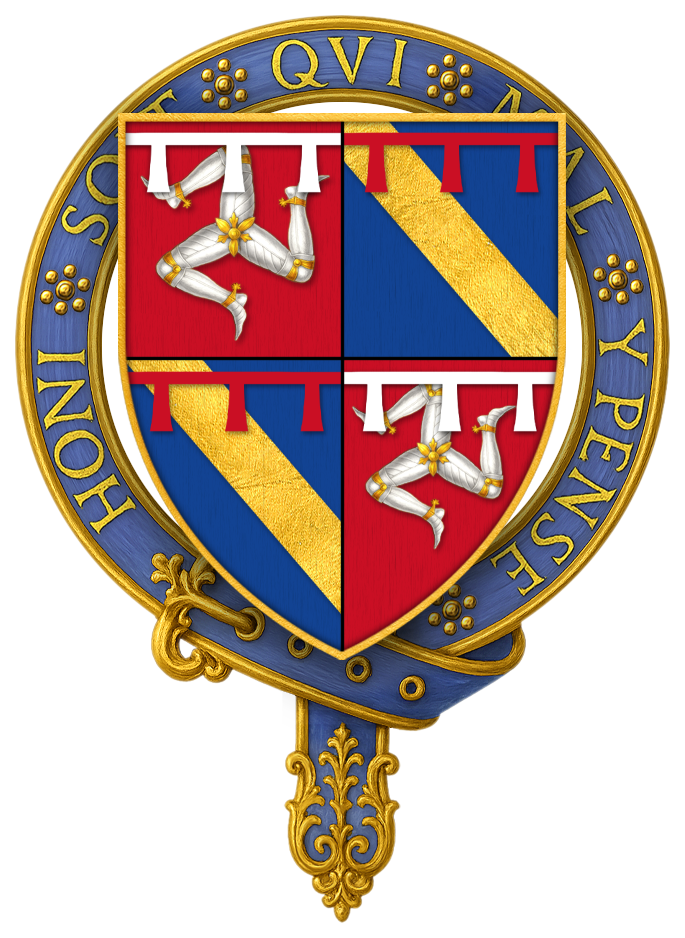
Arms of Sir William le Scrope, Knight of the Garter

He was a soldier-adventurer in Lithuania, Italy and France, where he served with John of Gaunt. Gaunt made him seneschal of Aquitaine in 1383. He was made vice-chamberlain of the household of King Richard II in 1393 and granted the castle and manor of Marlborough in Wiltshire. In the same year his father purchased for him the Isle of Man from the earl of Salisbury, giving him the nominal title Dominus de Man or King of Mann. In 1394 he became a Knight of the Garter.

He was created Earl of Wiltshire in 1397 and became Lord High Treasurer in 1398. He became effective head of the government in Richard's absence. He benefitted from the confiscated estates of Thomas de Beauchamp, 12th Earl of Warwick, who was kept for a time under his care in the Isle of Man, and of John of Gaunt; he also accumulated control of a number of strategic castles. He was left 2,000 marks in King Richard's will in April 1399.

He had been closely involved in Richard's second marriage to the six-year-old Isabella of Valois in 1396 and was made Isabella's guardian at Wallingford Castle, of which he was castellan, when the King went to Ireland in 1399.

Together with Sir John Bussy, Sir William Bagot and Sir Henry Green he had been made responsible for assisting Edmund of Langley, Duke of York, in the defence of the realm during Richard's absence, when the exiled Henry Bolingbroke, Duke of Hereford, seized his chance to invade. Scrope was captured with Bussy and Green when Bristol Castle surrendered to Henry on 28 July 1399. He was executed without trial at Bristol Castle, together with Bussy and Green, and his head carried to London in a white basket to be displayed on London Bridge. After Hereford's ascendance to the throne as Henry IV, Parliament confirmed the sentence and determined that all his estates and title were to be forfeit to the crown.

== Family ==
He married in 1396 to Isabel Russell (d. 1437), second daughter of Sir Maurice Russell (1356–1416) of Dyrham, Glos. and Kingston Russell, Dorset.

== Earldom ==
An attempt was made by Simon Thomas Scrope to reclaim the Earldom by a collateral descendant, over 500 years later. Although he was proven to be the senior heir male general, the claim failed on other grounds.

In 1869, the Committee for Privileges of the House of Lords, after a series of hearings beginning in 1862 under the title of Wiltes Claim of Peerage 4 HL 126, rejected the claim of Simon Thomas Scrope, of Danby, to the Earldom of Wiltes (Wiltshire) granted to William le Scrope, above. It was proved that Simon Thomas Scrope was the senior heir male of the Earl of Wiltes, but the Committee for Privileges decided that as a matter of law an English peerage could not descend to heirs male general who were not directly descended from the original grantee; they also rejected arguments based on the irregularity of the original sentence by Henry IV before he had become King. The Committee declined to follow its own earlier decision in the Devon Peerage Claim (1831) 5 English Reports 293, in which a grant to "heirs male" had been allowed to pass to heirs male collateral.

Peerage of England
| Preceded by New creation | Earl of Wiltshire; 1397–1399 | Succeeded by Forfeited |
Head of State of the Isle of Man
| Preceded by William II de Montacute | King of Mann; 1392–1399 | Succeeded by Henry Percy |
Political offices
| Preceded by Guy Mone | Lord High Treasurer; 1398–1399 | Succeeded by Sir John Norbury |
