= William Paulet, 1st Marquess of Winchester =

English official and peer

The Most Honourable The Marquess of Winchester KG PC
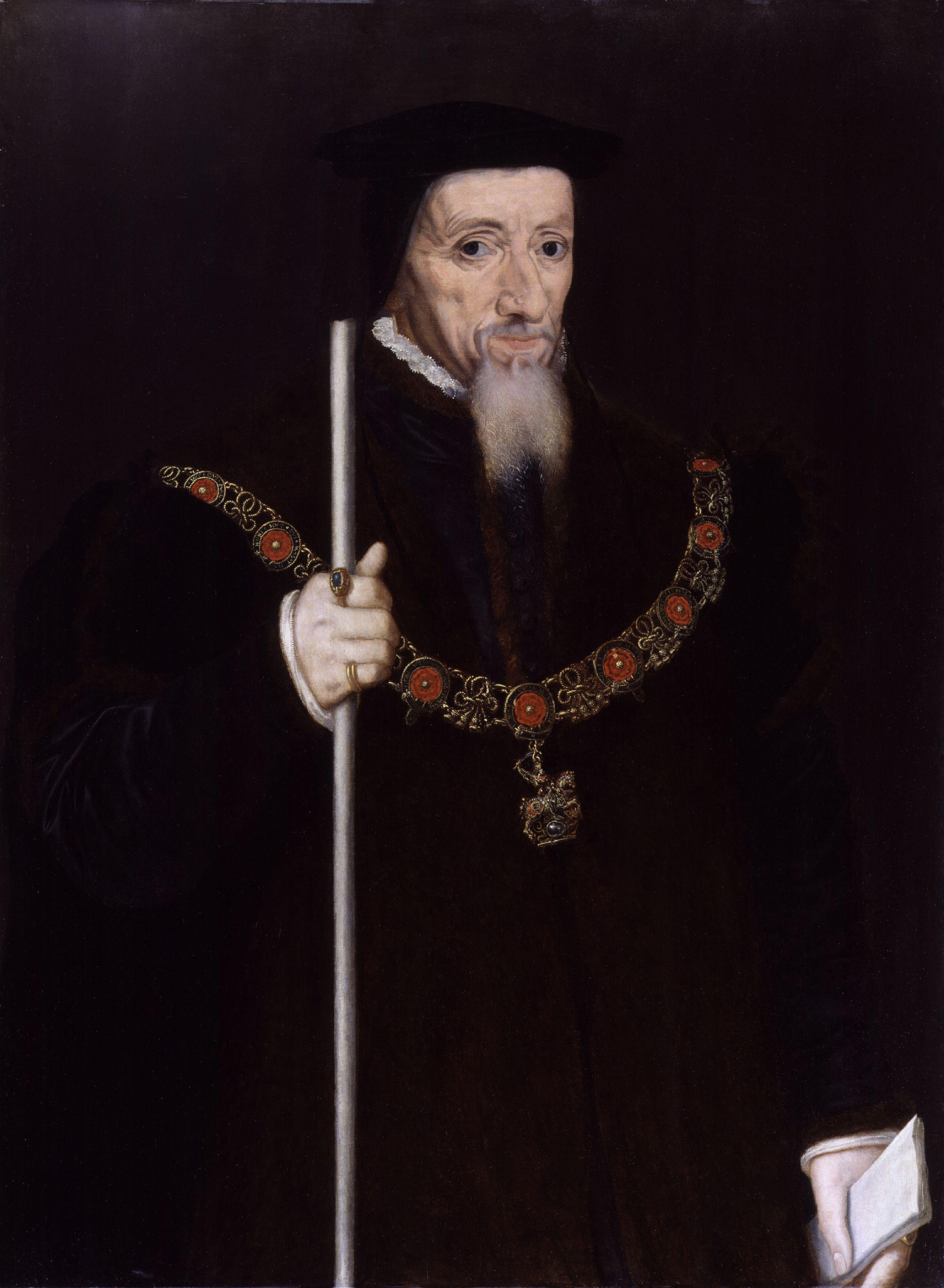
- Paulet, holding the white staff of the office of Lord High Treasurer

Lord High Steward for the trial of the Duke of Somerset
- In office October 1551 – November 1551
- Monarch: Edward VI
- Chancellor: Richard Rich, 1st Baron Rich

Lord Keeper of the Great Seal, Lord Chancellor (Keeper)
- In office 1547–1547
- Monarch: Edward VI
- Preceded by: Thomas Wriothesley, 1st Earl of Southampton
- Succeeded by: Richard Rich, 1st Baron Rich

Lord High Treasurer
- In office 3 February 1550 – 10 March 1572
- Monarchs: Edward VI; Mary I Elizabeth I
- Chancellor: See: The Lord Rich (1550–1551); Thomas Goodrich, Bishop of Ely (1551–1553); Stephen Gardiner, Bishop of Winchester (1553–1555); Nicholas Heath, Archbishop of York (1555–1558); Sir Nicholas Bacon (1558–1579) (as Lord Keeper)
- Preceded by: Edward Seymour, 1st Duke of Somerset
- Succeeded by: William Cecil, 1st Baron Burghley

Lord President of the Council
- In office January 1546 – 3 February 1550
- Monarchs: Henry VIII; Edward VI
- Chancellor: The Lord Rich
- Preceded by: Charles Brandon, 1st Duke of Suffolk
- Succeeded by: John Dudley, 1st Duke of Northumberland

Lord Steward of the Household
- In office 1544–1551
- Monarchs: Henry VIII; Edward VI
- Preceded by: Charles Brandon, 1st Duke of Suffolk
- Succeeded by: John Dudley, 1st Duke of Northumberland

Lord Chamberlain of the Household
- In office 1543–1555
- Monarchs: Henry VIII; Edward VI; Mary I
- Preceded by: William Sandys, 1st Baron Sandys
- Succeeded by: Unknown

Treasurer of the Household
- In office 1537–1539
- Monarch: Henry VIII
- Preceded by: William FitzWilliam, 1st Earl of Southampton
- Succeeded by: Sir Thomas Cheney

Comptroller of the Household
- In office 1532–1537
- Monarch: Henry VIII
- Preceded by: Sir Henry Guildford
- Succeeded by: John Russell, 1st Earl of Bedford

1st Lord Lieutenant of Hampshire
- In office 1551–1553
- Monarch: Henry VIII
- Preceded by: None (office created)
- Succeeded by: Office vacant

High Sheriff of Hampshire
- In office 1511–1512
- Monarch: Henry VIII
- Preceded by: Richard Sands
- Succeeded by: Sir William Compton
- In office 1518–1519
- Monarch: Henry VIII
- Preceded by: John Lisley
- Succeeded by: John Kaleway
- In office 1522–1523
- Monarch: Henry VIII
- Preceded by: William Giffard
- Succeeded by: Robert Wallop

Member of Parliament for Hampshire
- In office 1529–1536 Serving with Sir Richard Sandys
- Monarch: Henry VIII
- Preceded by: Unknown
- Succeeded by: Thomas Wriothesley
- Constituency: Hampshire

Personal details
- Born: William Paulet c.1483 Fisherton Delamere, Wiltshire
- Died: 10 March 1572 (aged 88–89) Basing House, Basing
- Resting place: St. Mary's Church, Basing, Hampshire; 51.271389°N 1.046667°W
- Spouse: Elizabeth Capel
- Children: John Paulet, 2nd Marquess of Winchester; Thomas Paulet; Chidiok Paulet; Giles Paulet; Alice Stawell; Lady Margaret Berkeley; Lady Margery Waller; Lady Eleanor Pecksall
- Parents: Sir John Paulet (father); Alice Paulet (mother)
- Awards: Knight of the Order of the Garter; Several Hereditary peerages
- 1st Marquess of Winchester
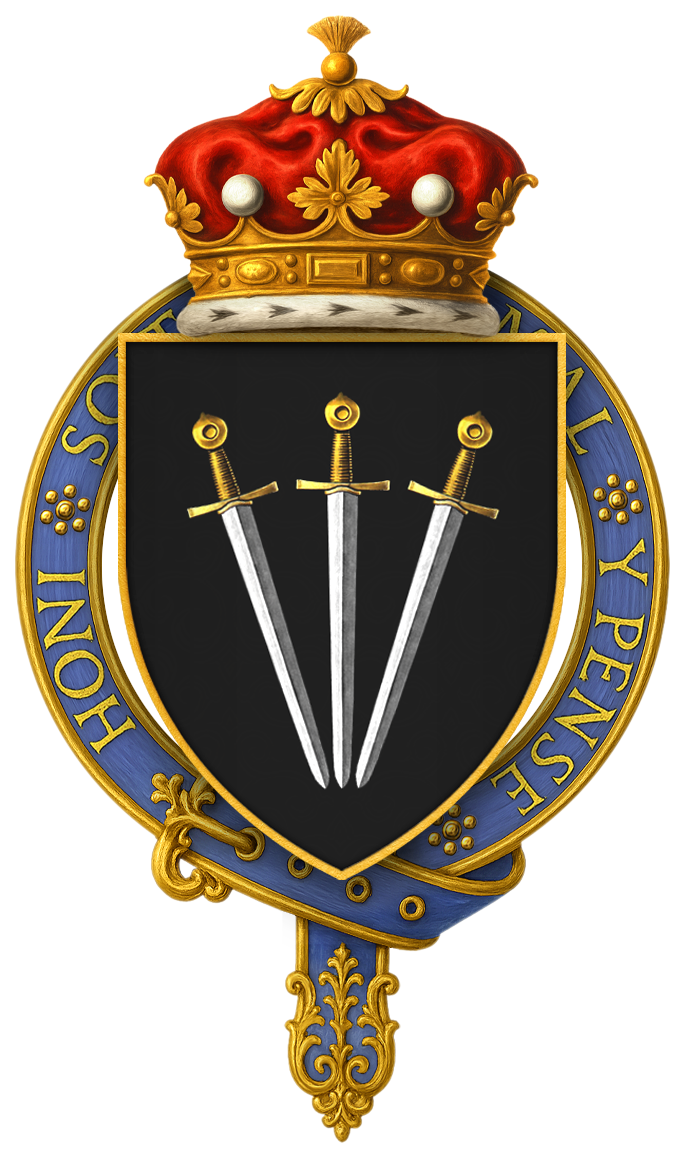
- Arms of William Paulet, 1st Marquess of Winchester, KG: Sable, three swords pilewise points in base proper pomels and hilts or
- Tenure: 11 October 1551 - 10 March 1572
- Predecessor: None (titles created)
- Successor: John Paulet, 2nd Marquess of Winchester
- Other titles: 1st Earl of Wiltshire; 1st Baron St John of Basing

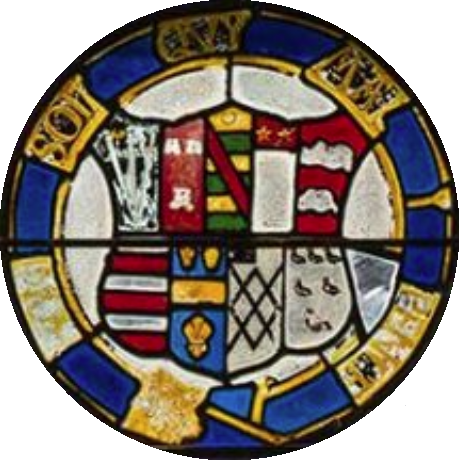
Arms of William Paulet, 1st Marquess of Winchester, KG, circumscribed by the Garter, Mapperton Church, Dorset

William Paulet, 1st Marquess of Winchester KG PC (c. 1483/1485 – 10 March 1572), styled Lord St John between 1539 and 1550 and Earl of Wiltshire between 1550 and 1551, was an English Lord High Treasurer, Lord Keeper of the Great Seal, and statesman.

== Family origins and early career in Hampshire ==
Paulet was the eldest son of Sir John Paulet (1460 – 5 January 1525) of Basing Castle in the parish of Old Basing, near Basingstoke in Hampshire, and of Nunney Castle in Somerset (inherited from the Delamere family in 1415), a cadet branch of Paulet of Hinton St George in Somerset. His mother Alice Paulet was his father's second cousin-once-removed the daughter of Sir William Paulet by his wife Elizabeth Denebaud. William had six siblings, including Sir George Paulet of Crondall Manor in Hampshire and Eleanor Paulet (born 1479), wife of William Giffard of Itchell Manor at Ewshot, also in Hampshire.

The family originated at the manor of Paulet (now Pawlett), near Bridgwater in Somerset. The senior branch of the Paulet/Powlet/Poulett family was seated at Hinton St George in Somerset, and had lived in that county since the early thirteenth century; the first Member of Parliament from that line represented Devon in 1385.

There is some disagreement over his date of birth, with different authorities quoting 1483 or 1485. A claim that he was ninety-seven at his death would place his birth in 1474 or 1475. There is also uncertainty about where he was born, but it may have been at Fisherton Delamere in Wiltshire, one of his father's manors.

His father, who had held a command against the Cornish rebels in 1497, was the head of the branch seated at Paulet and Road, close to Bridgwater, being the son of John Paulet and Elizabeth Roos. William's great-grandfather John Paulet acquired the Hampshire estates by his marriage with Constance Poynings, granddaughter and coheiress of Thomas Poynings, 5th Baron St John of Basing; his barony became abeyant upon his death in 1428/1429.

William Paulet was High Sheriff of Hampshire in 1512, 1519, 1523, and again in 1527. Knighted before the end of 1525, he was appointed Master of the King's Wards in November 1526 and appeared in the Privy Council in the same year.

== Marriage and issue ==
He married Elizabeth (d. 25 December 1558), daughter of Sir William Capel, Lord Mayor of London and Margaret Arundell in 1503, and by her had four sons and four daughters:

- John Paulet, 2nd Marquess of Winchester
- Thomas
- Chidiock Paulet (also spelled Chidiok, Chediok, Chidieok, or Chidiock), governor of Southampton under Mary and Elizabeth
- Giles
- Alice, married Richard Stawell, of Cotherston, Somerset
- Margaret, married Sir William Berkeley
- Margery, married Sir Richard Waller, of Oldstoke, Hampshire
- Eleanor (died 26 September 1558), married Sir Richard Pecksall (died 1571) of Beaurepaire, Hampshire, hereditary Master of the Buckhounds.

== Career as a national statesman ==
During his long career Paulet held numerous offices, which included:

- High Sheriff of Hampshire 1511–12, 1518–19 and 1522–23
- Joint Master of the King's Wards 1526–34 and sole Master of the King's Wards 1534–40
- Member of Parliament for Hampshire 1529–36
- Comptroller of the Household 1532–37
- Keeper of Pamber Forest 1535/6
- Treasurer of the Household 1537–38/9
- Master of the King's Woods 1541
- Master of the Court of Wards 1540–42
- Master of the Court of Wards and Liveries 1542–54
- Privy Counsellor 1542
- Lord Chamberlain of the Household 1543–45
- Lord Steward of the Household 1545-1549/50
- Chief Justice in Eyre, South of Trent 1545–49/50
- Lord President of the Council 1546–49
- Joint Governor of King Edward VI
- Lord Keeper of the Great Seal 1547
- Keeper and Captain of St Andrew's Castle, Hamble 1547–71/2
- Keeper of Alice Holt and Woolmer Forests 1548–71/2
- Lord High Treasurer 1549/50–71/2
- Lord High Steward for the trial of the Duke of Somerset 1551
- Lord Lieutenant of Hampshire 1552, 1553 and 1559
- Lieutenant of the forces in London 1558
- Speaker of the House of Lords 1558 and 1566
- Lord Lieutenant of Hampshire and Middlesex 1569
- Joint Lord Lieutenant of London 1569

Paulet's political career began in 1529, when he was elected knight of the shire for Hampshire. In 1532, he accompanied King Henry VIII to Calais, France, and the following spring, he accompanied the Duke of Norfolk to join King Francis I of France in a proposed audience with the Pope, to discuss Henry's divorce from Catherine of Aragon. In 1536, he was granted the keepership of Pamber Forest, and on 9 March 1539 was created Baron St John. He became steward of the bishopric of Winchester, and became a close associate of Cardinal Thomas Wolsey and a friend of Thomas Cromwell. He was also Comptroller of the Royal Household, and held many other high positions.

He owned Amport House on the outskirts of the village of Amport in Hampshire.

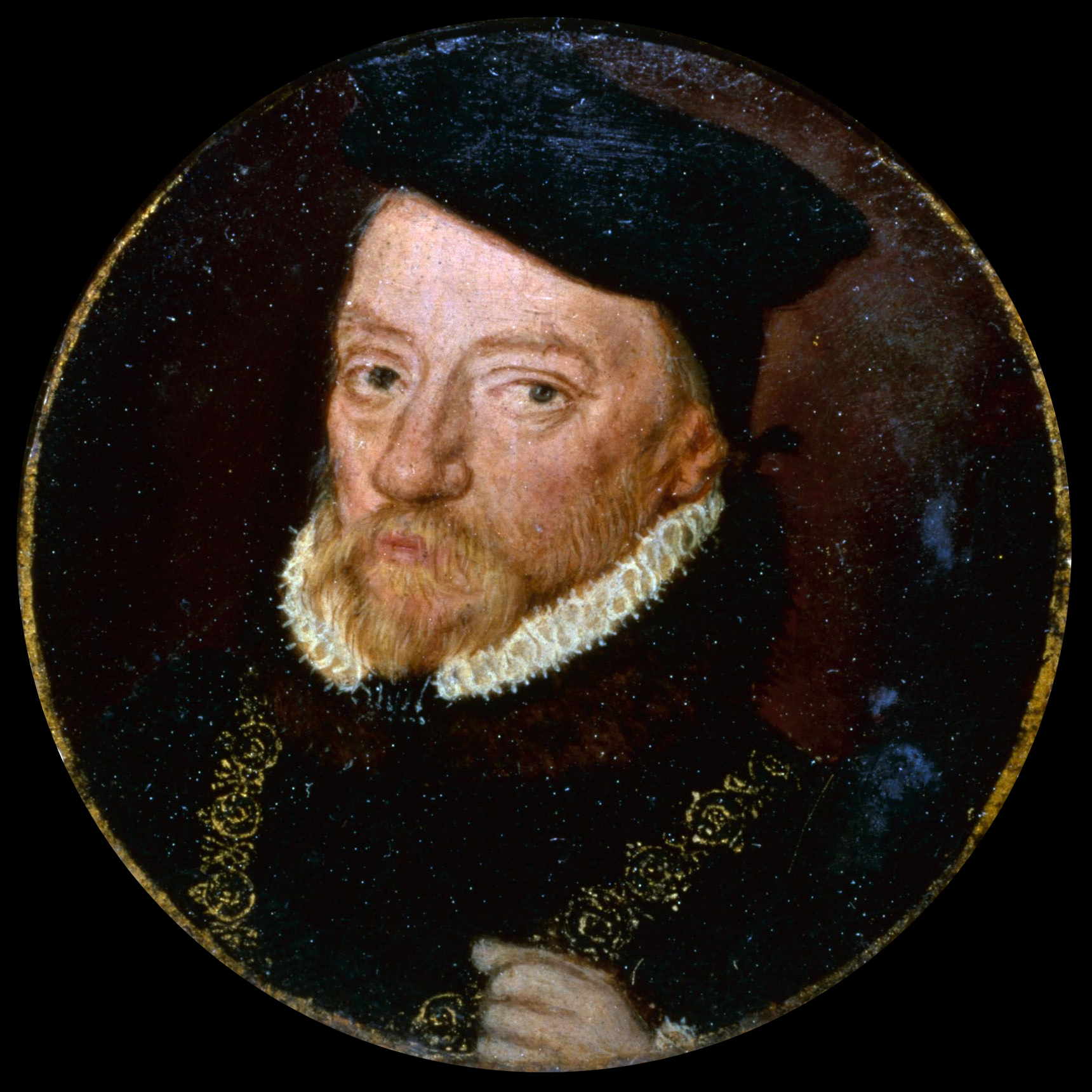
Portrait miniature, c. 1555

In 1535 and 1536, he served as one of the judges for the trials of John Fisher, Sir Thomas More, and the alleged accomplices of Anne Boleyn; in 1535, he became Lord Chamberlain. He partially led the royal forces against the Pilgrimage of Grace, a rebellion that broke out in the autumn of 1536, and in 1538, he became Treasurer of the Household. In 1540, he became the master of Henry's Court of Wards and Liveries, a Knight of the Garter in 1543. In June 1543, he was one of the six commissioners of the Treaty of Greenwich, an agreement for the marriage of Mary, Queen of Scots, and Prince Edward. He was Governor of Portsmouth and Lord Steward of the Household in 1545. In 1546, he became Lord President of the Council, and in 1547, he was an executor of the will of King Henry VIII.

He continued his political manoeuvres in 1549 by supporting the Earl of Warwick against the Duke of Somerset—in reward, on 19 January 1550 he was given the Earldom of Wiltshire and Somerset's position of Lord Treasurer. In the following month Warwick took over the post of Lord President of the Council. When Warwick was created Duke of Northumberland on 11 October 1551, Paulet received the Marquessate of Winchester. Six weeks later, he served as Lord High Steward in the Duke of Somerset's trial.

It was said that Northumberland and Winchester "ruled the court" of the minor King Edward VI. Queen Mary I affirmed him in all of his positions. After her death, he remained Lord Treasurer and retained many of his other positions, and even at an advanced age (in 1559, he was over seventy years old), he showed no signs of declining—he was Speaker of the House of Lords in 1559 and 1566. He remained in good standing with the English monarchs — Queen Elizabeth I once joked, "for, by my troth, if my lord treasurer were but a young man, I could find it in my heart to have him for a husband before any man in England." Late in life, he opposed any military support of Continental Protestantism, as he feared it would cause a breach with strongly Catholic Spain.

Paulet enjoyed a remarkably long career during the Reformation. Starting out as a Catholic, he was quickly persuaded to see things Henry's way once the breach with Rome had been decided on. He was rewarded with former Church properties following the dissolution of the monasteries. Under Edward VI he became an evangelical Protestant and persecuted Roman Catholics and Henrician Conservatives alike. On the accession of the Catholic Mary he announced his reconversion and commenced persecuting his former Protestant co-religionists, even denouncing Bishop Bonner for "laxity in prosecuting the heretics." His wife also found favour with Mary. On Tuesday 21 August 1554, when Mary went into Westminster Abbey her train was carried by Elizabeth, Marchioness of Winchester and Anne of Cleves.

On Elizabeth's succession, he once again shifted his sails and became an advocate of middle-road Anglicanism. All in all, he professed five changes in religious course. Once, when asked how he managed to survive so many storms, not only unhurt, but rising all the while, Paulet answered: "By being a willow, not an oak".

Sir William Paulet, detail of portrait

== Death ==
Paulet was still in office when he died on 10 March 1572, a very old man, at Basing House, which he held to rebuild and fortify. His tomb is on the south side of the chancel of Basing church.

== Bibliography ==
- Alsop, J. D.; Loades, D. M. (Autumn 1987). "William Paulet, First Marquis of Winchester: A Question of Age". The Sixteenth Century Journal. 18 (3): 333–342. doi:10.2307/2540720. JSTOR 2540720. S2CID 166056236. in JSTOR
- Bryson, Alan (26 November 2008). "The Legal Quays: Sir William Paulet, First Marquis of Winchester". Gresham College. Free Public Lectures. Gresham.ac.uk. Archived from the original on 27 December 2010.
- Cokayne, G. E. (1898). Complete Peerage of England, Scotland, Ireland, Great Britain and the United Kingdom, Extant, Extinct or Dormant. Vol. VIII. Exeter: William Pollard.
- Davidson, Alan (1982). "PAULET, Sir William (by 1488–1572), of Basing and Netley, Hants, Chelsea, Mdx. and London". In Bindoff, S. T. (ed.). Members. The History of Parliament: the House of Commons 1509–1558. Historyofparliamentonline.org. Archived from the original on 30 October 2013.
- "Letters and Papers, Foreign and Domestic, Henry VIII". British-history.ac.uk.
- Pincombe, Mike (May 2009). "The Life and Death of Sir William Paulet" (Abstract: Broughton, Rowlande (1572), A Briefe Discourse of the Lyfe and Death of the Late Right High and Honorable Sir William Pawlet Knight .... London: By Richarde Iohnes). Hrionline.ac.uk. Archived from the original on 3 March 2014.
- Tait, James (1895). "Paulet, William (1485?-1572)". In Lee, Sidney (ed.). Dictionary of National Biography. Vol. 44. London: Smith, Elder & Co. pp. 92–94.

Political offices
Preceded by Sir Henry Guilford	Comptroller of the Household; 1532–1537	Succeeded by Sir John Russell
Preceded by The Lord Sandys	Lord Chamberlain; 1543–1545	Succeeded by Henry FitzAlan, 19th Earl of Arundel
Preceded by Sir William Fitzwilliam	Treasurer of the Household; 1538–1541	Succeeded by Sir Thomas Cheney
Preceded by The Duke of Suffolk	Lord Steward; 1544–1551	Succeeded by The Duke of Northumberland
Preceded by The Duke of Suffolk	Lord President of the Council; 1546–1550	Succeeded by The Duke of Northumberland
Preceded by The Earl of Southampton (Lord Chancellor)	Keeper of the Great Seal; 1547	Succeeded by Richard Rich (Lord Chancellor)
Preceded by The Duke of Somerset	Lord High Treasurer; 1550–1572	Succeeded by The Lord Burghley
Legal offices
Preceded by The Duke of Suffolk	Justice in Eyre south of the Trent; 1545–bef. 1550	Succeeded by The Marquess of Dorset
Honorary titles
Preceded by Unknown	Custos Rotulorum of Hampshire bef. 1544 – aft. 1558	Succeeded by Earl of Wiltshire
Preceded by Unknown	Lord Lieutenant of Hampshire; 1551–?	Succeeded by Unknown
Peerage of England
New title	Marquess of Winchester; 1551–1572	Succeeded by John Paulet
New title	Earl of Wiltshire; 1550–1572	Succeeded by John Paulet
New title	Baron St John of Basing (descended by acceleration); 1539–1554	Succeeded by John Paulet
