= Charles Paulet, 13th Marquess of Winchester =

British peer and courtier (1764–1843)

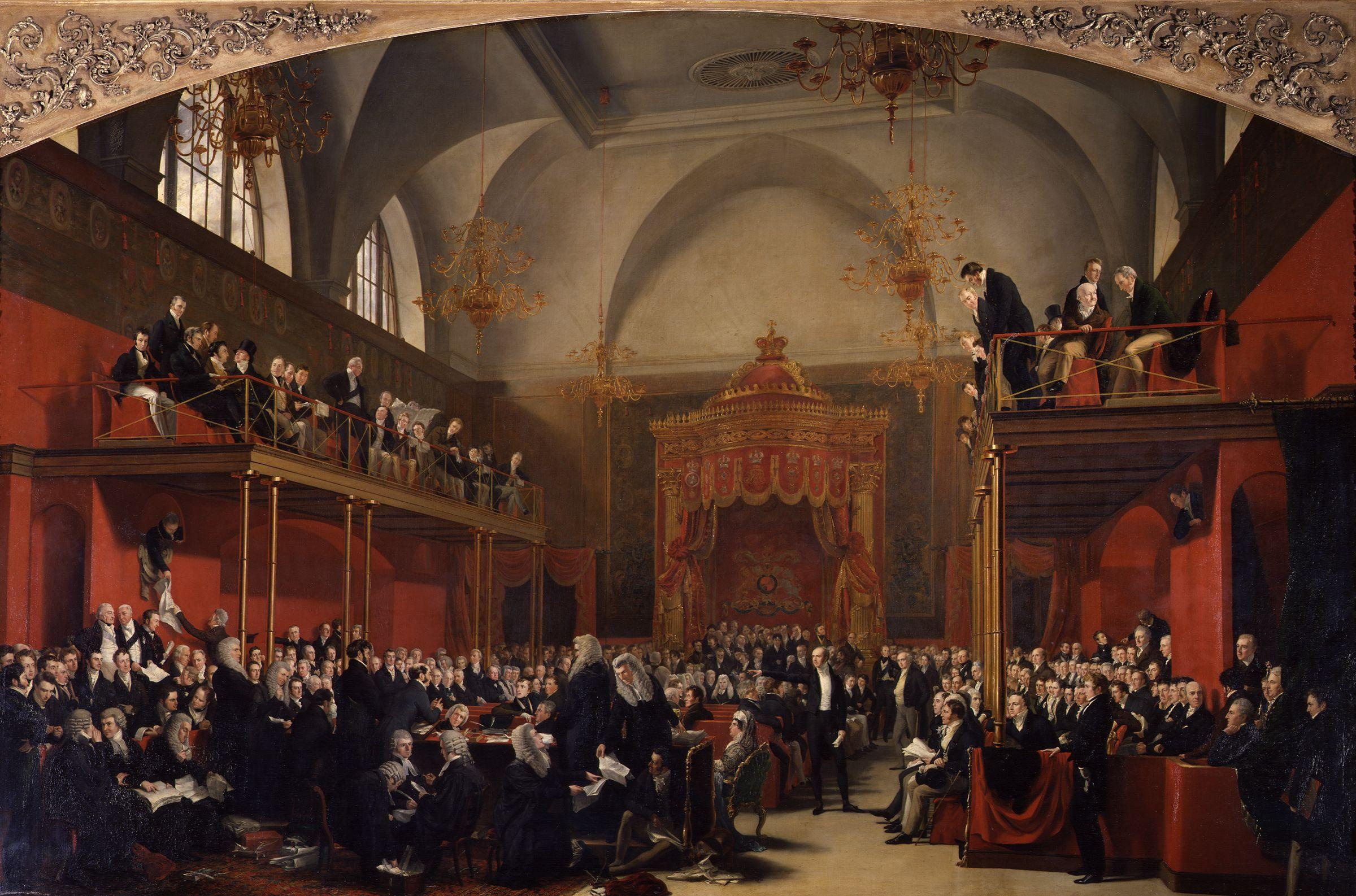
The Trial of Queen Caroline 1820, by Sir George Hayter

Charles Ingoldsby Burroughs-Paulet, 13th Marquess of Winchester PC (27 January 1764 – 29 November 1843) was a British peer and courtier, styled Earl of Wiltshire from 1794 until 1800.

== Life ==
Baptized as Charles Ingoldsby Paulet, he was the eldest son of George Paulet, 12th Marquess of Winchester, a courtier and Martha Ingoldsby. He was educated at Eton and Clare College, Cambridge. In 1774, his father became heir presumptive to some peerages and estates of his third cousin Harry Powlett, 6th Duke of Bolton. After graduating from Cambridge, Paulet was commissioned as an ensign into the 1st Regiment of Foot Guards, serving from 1784–86. He then sat in the Commons as Member of Parliament (MP) for Truro from 1792–96. His father succeeded as Marquess of Winchester in 1794, giving Paulet the courtesy title of Earl of Wiltshire. In 1796 he returned to a part-time military life as Lt.-Colonel of the North Hampshire Militia and in 1798 became Lord Lieutenant of Hampshire. In 1800 he succeeded his father as Marquess of Winchester.

In 1812, Lord Winchester became Groom of the Stole to George III and continued as such under George IV and up until the death of William IV in 1837. When Queen Victoria came to the throne that year, the office was abolished as to the Sovereign – Prince Albert continued to have one, as did the Prince of Wales until the complete abolition of the office in 1901. On 8 August 1839, he added the name of Burroughs to his own, when he inherited the property of Dame Sarah Salusbury (née Burroughs), under the terms of her will.

Lord Winchester died in 1843 and his titles passed to his eldest son, John.

== Marriage and issue ==
Paulet married Anne Andrews (daughter of John Andrews of Shotley Hall) on 31 July 1800 and they had eight children:

- John Paulet, 14th Marquess of Winchester (1801–1887), succeeded his father
- Rev. Lord Charles Paulet (13 August 1802 – 23 July 1870), a religious minister, married first Caroline Ramsden, and second Joan Granville; ancestor of the 18th and present Marquess of Winchester
- Lord George Paulet (1803–1879), an admiral, married Georgina Wood
- Lord William Paulet (1804–1893), a field marshal, died unmarried
- Lady Annabella (6 August 1805 – 26 May 1855), married Rear-Admiral William Ramsden on 31 July 1827
- Lady Cecilia (12 November 1806 – 23 August 1890), married Sir Charles des Voeux, 2nd Baronet on 13 December 1842
- Stillborn son (14 May 1807)
- Lord Frederick Paulet (1810–1871), a soldier and equerry to Princess Augusta, Duchess of Cambridge, died unmarried

Parliament of Great Britain
Preceded by William Augustus Spencer Boscawen; James Gordon	Member of Parliament for Truro; 1792–1796; With: James Gordon	Succeeded by John Leveson-Gower; John Lemon
Honorary titles
Preceded by In Commission	Lord Lieutenant of Hampshire; 1798–1800	Succeeded by The Lord Bolton
Court offices
Preceded by The Earl of Winchilsea and Nottingham	Groom of the Stole; 1812–1837	Vacant
Peerage of England
Preceded by George Paulet	Marquess of Winchester; 1800–1843	Succeeded by John Paulet
