= Isle of Wight Militia =

Auxiliary unit of the British Army

Isle of Wight Trained Bands Isle of Wight Light Infantry Duke of Connaught's Own Isle of Wight Artillery
- Active: 1558–16 March 1909
- Country: England (1558–1707); Kingdom of Great Britain (1707–1800); United Kingdom (1801–1909)
- Branch: Militia
- Role: Infantry; Coastal artillery
- Garrison/HQ: Sandown
- Engagements: Battle of Bonchurch; Second Boer War

The Isle of Wight Militia (IoWM) was an auxiliary military force on the Isle of Wight off the South Coast of England. From their formal organisation as Trained Bands in 1558 until their final service as coastal artillery, the Militia regiments of the island served in home defence in all of Britain's major wars until 1909.

== Early history ==
The English militia was descended from the Anglo-Saxon Fyrd, the military force raised from the freemen of the shires under command of their Sheriff. The universal obligation to serve continued under the Norman and Plantagenet kings and was reorganised under the Assizes of Arms of 1181 and 1252, and again by the Statute of Winchester of 1285. The able-bodied men were equipped by their parishes and arrayed by the Hundreds into which each county was divided. Although under the Sheriff of Southampton (Hampshire), (Note: For a large part of its history Hampshire was formally known as the County of Southampton to distinguish it from Northamptonshire; today 'Southampton' refers only to the city.) the Isle of Wight had its own organisation under the Constable of Carisbrooke Castle. In 1341, in the early years of the Hundred Years' War, this consisted of nine companies commanded as follows:

- William Russell of Yaverland: including Bembridge, Northill and Brading
- Peter de Heyno of Stenbury: guarding the Undercliff, the heights of Niton, Apse, Wroxall, Bonchurch and Whitwell
- Theobald de Gorges of Knighton: the men of Ryde, St Helen's, Kern, Binstead, Newchurch and Quarr
- The Bailiffs of Newport
- John Urry of East Standen: the men of Whippingham, Wootton, Arreton, St Catherines, Rookly asnd Nettlecomb
- John de Kingston: the men of West Medina, including Kingston, Carisbrooke, Shorwell and Northwood
- Thomas Chyke of Mottistone: Calbourne, Newtown and Brighstone
- The Lord of Brook: Shalfleet, Thorley and Yarmouth
- Adam of Compton: the cliffs of Freshwater, the downs of Afton, and the heights of Compton

If the men raised by these gentlemen were insufficient to defend the island, the constable was instructed to levy additional men and to arm and train them. He was also empowered to levy reinforcements from Hampshire at the king's expense. In the same year the Earl of Salisbury with his retinue and another 10 knights and 8 esquires were ordered to carry out their feudal service on the island for its defence.

When the South Coast of England was raided by a French and Castilian force in 1377 the island's levies were still organised into nine companies of 100 men each, reinforced from Hampshire and London. The French landed and burned Yarmouth and Newtown, and the islanders took refuge at Carisbrooke, which was defended by the constable, Sir Hugh Tyrell. A party of French approaching the castle down a narrow lane were ambushed by Tyrrell and the resulting slaughter led to it being called 'Deadman's Lane'. During the siege Peter de Heyno is said to have picked off the French leader with a bow shot through a loophole. The invaders left after they were paid a bribe. The French raided the island again in 1402 and 1404, doing some damage, but retired to their ships once the levies had assembled.

King Henry VIII enforced the militia statutes in 1511, and in 1539 under threat of invasion he ordered a Great Muster of the militia of all the counties. In 1545 a French fleet entered the Solent and invaded the Isle of Wight, being opposed by the Isle of Wight and Hampshire levies at the Battle of Bonchurch and at Bembridge. The levies fell back to the woods and hedgerows, and then counterattacked from the heights of Culver Down. Although these skirmishes were inconclusive, the French evacuated the island after the equally inconclusive naval Battle of the Solent.

== Isle of Wight Trained Bands ==
The legal basis of the militia was updated by two acts of 1557 covering musters (4 & 5 Ph. & M. c. 3) and the maintenance of horses and armour (4 & 5 Ph. & M. c. 2). The county militia was now under the Lord Lieutenant (known on the Isle of Wight as the Governor), assisted by the deputy lieutenants and justices of the peace (JPs). The entry into force of these acts in 1558 is seen as the starting date for the organised county militia in England. Although the militia obligation was universal, it was impractical to train and equip every able-bodied man, and in 1570 Hampshire was one of the counties instructed to make special arrangements for equipping and training arquebusiers. From 1572 the practice across the country was to select a proportion of men for the Trained bands (TBs) who were mustered for regular training.

The government aimed for 10 days' training a year, with a two-day national 'general muster' at Michaelmas, and two 'special musters' lasting four days for detailed training at Easter and Whitsun. In the early years of Queen Elizabeth I's reign the nationwide musters only occurred roughly every four years, and from 1578 the special musters were reduced to two days each. However, the Governor, Sir George Carey, ordered special musters of the Isle of Wight companies in spring and summer to ensure that sick and dead men were replaced, and that training was kept up. When war broke out with Spain, training and equipping the militia became a priority. From 1583 counties were organised into groups for training purposes, with emphasis on the invasion-threatened 'maritime' counties. The 1572 defence plan for Hampshire was updated: while the coastal districts were made responsible for guarding the coastline, inland villages in the west and north-west of the county were to send 2339 reinforcements across to the Isle of Wight, recognised as the most likely place for an invasion.

=== Armada crisis ===
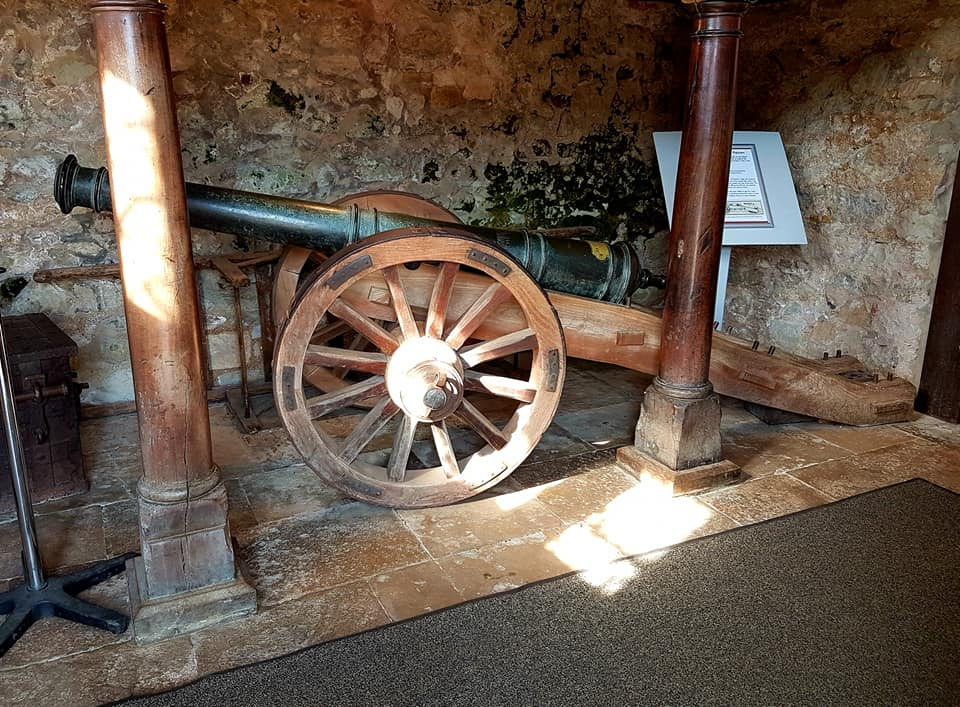
The Carisbrooke Falcon, one of the cannons issued to each parish for defence.

With invasion threatened in 1588, Sir John Norreys was appointed in April to oversee the defences of the maritime counties and the lords-lieutenant were instructed to carry out his orders in relation to rallying-points for the coast defenders if they were driven inland by invaders. The Isle of Wight had 1800 trained bandsmen, nearly two-thirds with firearms, bowmen only amounting to 109, with 116 pikemen and 470 halberdiers. The men from Hampshire assigned to reinforce the island were to gather at Hurst Castle for the crossing by requisitioned boats. Each parish on the island had a cannon for defence.

The Spanish Armada was spotted off the coast of South-West England on 30 July 1588 and the signal beacons were lit, calling out the TBs along the south coast and across the country. The Armada was engaged by the Royal Navy in a running fight up the English Channel. The Armada's orders were not to land in Southern England, but to sail to the Spanish Netherlands and pick up an army under the Duke of Parma to invade up the Thames Estuary. However a council of war among its officers decided to shelter east of the Isle of Wight and make contact with Parma before continuing. To those watching from the shore this had the appearance of preparations to land on the Isle of Wight or the Hampshire coast. The Royal Navy continued its attacks, and during this Battle of the Isle of Wight Carey offered to send some of his musketeers from the island to reinforce the English fleet. This was turned down by the Lord High Admiral, Lord Howard of Effingham, who had no intention of fighting boarding actions and considered that he had as many men as he needed to work his ships and heavy guns. Under continuous attacks and faced with contrary winds and currents, the Armada was unable to make its way into the Spithead anchorage off Portsmouth, and continued on its course up the Channel. It failed to link with Parma's army, and was finally driven away into the North Sea by fireships and bad weather. The TBs along the coast could then be stood down.

In 1599 a fresh alarm brought orders that in the event of invasion Hampden Paulet, one of the county's 'martial men' and formerly a Captain in the Netherlands, would reinforce the Isle of Wight with 500 men from the Hampshire TBs. When the Hampshire TBs were mobilised to protect Portsmouth on 8 August Paulet reported that the men were slow to arrive, were poorly equipped and showed little enthusiasm. Nevertheless, the force had fully mobilised before it was stood down on 18 August.

=== Stuart reform ===
With the passing of the threat of invasion, the trained bands declined in the early 17th Century. Later, in 1625–9 King Charles I attempted to reform them into a national force or 'Perfect Militia' answering to the king rather than local control. The Isle of Wight TBs in 1625 comprised 2,020 men in 12 bands:

- Sir John Oglander's Band – 97 men
- Sir Edward Dennis's Band – 210 men
- Appuldurcombe Band – 261 men
- Sir John Richards' Band – 109 men
- Mr Cheeke's Band – 134 men
- Sir William Meux's Band – 261 men
- Mr Dillington's Band – 122 men
- Mr Boorman's Band – 115 men
- Mr Hobson's Band – 170 men
- Mr Urrie's Band – 122 men
- Newport Band – 304 men
- Mr John Leigh's Band – 95 men

Oglander was deputy governor of the Isle of Wight and he and Dennis were the Members of Parliament (MPs) for Yarmouth. Of the total of 2,002 men, 133 were officers, 1,088 were musketeers and 33 had calivers, there were 263 pikemen with corslets (armour) and 196 'bare' pikemen, 10 halberdiers, and 297 unarmed men.

=== Civil Wars ===
Control of the militia was one of the major points of dispute between Charles I and Parliament that led to the First English Civil War. At the outbreak of hostilities in 1642 Carisbrooke Castle was held for the king by the Countess of Portland and Colonel Brett. They were promptly besieged by Moses Read, Mayor of Newport, at the head of the Newport TB, assisted by 400 sailors. The garrison was only 20 strong, with three days' provisions, so the countess quickly surrendered on terms. Thereafter John Leigh (now Col Sir John Leigh, MP for Yarmouth), commanded the TBs on the island for Parliament from 1642 to 1647.

Once Parliament had established full control of the country it passed new Militia Acts in 1648 and 1650 that replaced lords lieutenant with county commissioners appointed by Parliament or the Council of State. At the same time the term 'Trained Band' began to disappear in most counties. Under the Commonwealth and Protectorate the militia received pay when called out, and operated alongside the New Model Army to control the country. Detailed instructions for the Isle of Wight Militia were issued in 1651, covering the duties of the coast watch under their 'searchers', the process for calling out the militia if the invasion beacons were fired, and the maintenance of the parish cannons.

== Restoration Militia ==
After the Restoration of the Monarchy, the English Militia was re-established by the Militia Act 1661 under the control of the king's lords-lieutenant, the men to be selected by parish ballot. This was popularly seen as the 'Constitutional Force' to counterbalance a 'Standing Army' tainted by association with the New Model Army that had supported Cromwell's military dictatorship. Almost the whole burden of home defence and internal security was entrusted to the militia under politically reliable local landowners.

The militia were regularly used to arrest suspected dissidents, and in 1664 the governor, Lord Colepeper, broke up a large meeting of Quakers on the Isle of Wight and made numerous arrests. During the Second Dutch War, three companies of the Berkshire Militia were sent to augment the defenders of the Isle of Wight in 1665, and the Hampshire Militia were called out in 1666. When the Dutch raided the Medway in 1667, the Berkshire and Wiltshire Militia were each ordered to send three companies and a troop of horse to reinforce the IoWM. In the Third Dutch War the whole militia of the south coast was put on standby several times in 1679. Admiral Sir Robert Holmes, MP for Newport, was Governor of the Isle of Wight and commander of an independent militia company 1669–87.

The Isle of Wight Militia do not appear to have been involved after the landing in the West Country of the Duke of Monmouth in 1685 and they took no part in the Sedgemoor Campaign. King James II distrusted the militia under its county landed gentry, and after Sedgemoor he neglected it in favour of a greatly increased regular army. However, when William of Orange landed in the West Country in 1688 he was virtually unopposed by the regulars or the militia, and was able to depose James II in the Glorious Revolution. The militia organisation continued unchanged under William.

When the Royal Navy suffered a defeat at the Battle of Beachy Head in 1690 the whole of the militia was called out for a month, a large camp being formed at Portsmouth, and 8000 regulars and militia were concentrated on the Isle of Wight.

In 1697 the counties were required to submit detailed lists of their militia. The Isle of Wight Militia under the Governor, Lord Cutts, comprised:

- East Medina Regiment – Col Lord Cutts, 8 companies, 732 rank and file, with 70 'spare men'
- West Medina Regiment – Col David Urry, 8 companies, 750 rank and file with 104 spare
- Independent Company at Cowes – Lieutenant Joseph Burton, 96 men

However, the militia passed into virtual abeyance during the long peace after the Treaty of Utrecht in 1713, and few units were called out during the Jacobite Risings of 1715 and 1745.

== 1757 Reforms ==
Under threat of French invasion during the Seven Years' War a series of Militia Acts from 1757 reorganised the county militia regiments, the men being conscripted by means of parish ballots (paid substitutes were permitted) to serve for three years. In peacetime they assembled for 28 days' annual training. There was a property qualification for officers, who were commissioned by the lord lieutenant. An adjutant and drill sergeants were to be provided to each regiment from the Regular Army, and arms and accoutrements would be supplied when the county had secured 60 per cent of its quota of recruits.

Hampshire was given a quota of 960 men to raise in two regiments with an independent Isle of Wight Company of 60 men at Cowes, attached to the South Hampshire Militia. Although mainland Hampshire raised its militia quickly, and the two regiments served in home defence until the end of the Seven Years' War, this was not the case for the Isle of Wight. Exploiting the island's anomalous legal position and seeing little need for militia when there was a large regular garrison on the island, the gentlemen of the Isle of Wight did nothing until long after the war ended.

It was not until April 1771 that Edward Meux Worsley was appointed captain of the IoW company, and it was first embodied for permanent duty on 20 April 1778, during the American War of Independence, when Britain was threatened with invasion by the Americans' allies, France and Spain. The company was ordered on 15 July 1778 to garrison Ryde and Brading, while the North Hampshire Militia manned Carisbrooke Castle, Newport and Cowes. The IoW Company was now regarded as an independent corps, with the captain given the power to convene courts-martial during embodiment, and the Militia Act 1779 gave the Governor (rather than the Lord Lieutenant of Hampshire) the power to appoint the officers of the IoWM. Unusually, the unit was not obliged to serve outside the island. It remained at Ryde and Brading, occasionally assisting the Customs officers against smugglers or escorting army recruits. From March 1781 it was distributed in detachments along the coast from St Boniface Down to Freshwater, including Shanklin. It was in Yarmouth for winter quarters in 1781–82. Worsley resigned on 7 March 1782, and John Popham (lieutenant since the embodiment) was promoted to succeed him. That summer the company was moved around the island regularly, vacating Newtown in September while an election was being held. The company was quartered at Ryde from October 1782 until the militia was ordered to be disembodied on 28 February 1783.

=== French Revolutionary War ===
From 1784 to 1792 the militia were assembled for their annual peacetime training, but to save money only two-thirds of the men were actually mustered each year. In 1792 the IoWM was embodied for 20 days until 5 December, but then the whole of the militia began to be called out because of increasing tension with Revolutionary France. The IoW Company was embodied under Capt Popham on 25 December and quartered once more at Ryde and Brading. France declared war on Britain on 1 February 1793.

In 1794 the militia was augmented by adding companies of volunteers rather than balloted men; John Delgarno was appointed captain of the additional IoW company on 29 July 1794. The Government then raised the Supplementary Militia by ballot in 1796, which brought the IoWM up to 250 men by 1797. A third company was formed and Popham was promoted to Major-Commandant of the whole corps on 24 September. Benjamin Joliffe, who had been surgeon of the IoWM since 1780, was appointed captain of the third company and his son James, ensign since 1795, became his lieutenant.

In the summer of 1798 the Irish Rebellion became serious, and the French were sending help to the rebels. An act of Parliament was passed allowing the English Militia to volunteer for service in Ireland. Two companies of the Isle of Wight Militia offered to serve there but their offer was not accepted since it would denude the island when a cross-Channel invasion was still possible.

In February 1799 the corps was at Newport under Maj Popham, and in the summer it occupied the barracks at Grange Chine. The threat of invasion seemed to have receded and the Supplementary Militia was stood down in July. The surplus men were encouraged to volunteer for the Regular Army. The IoWM reverted to its establishment strength of one company on 10 March 1800. However, a second company under Capt Delgarno and two of the supernumerary lieutenants was retained and manned by re-embodied supplementaries. The Treaty of Amiens was signed in March 1802, ending the war, and the IoWM was disembodied on 23 April.

=== Napoleonic Wars ===
The Peace of Amiens was short-lived and the government began re-embodying the militia from November 1802. The IoWM was called out on 24 April 1803 as a single company with a strength of 90 men (including 30 newly-balloted supplementaries), though only about 70 were kept embodied. Popham resigned the command and Capt Delgarno was appointed commandant on 19 March 1803. The company took over a consignment of old muskets left at Brighstone by the East Kent Militia when they finished a previous deployment to the island, and these were sent for safekeeping in Newport Church belfry.

During the summer of 1805, when Napoleon was massing his 'Army of England' at Boulogne for a projected invasion, the 71 men of the IoWM under Capt Delgarno were in Grange Chine Barracks as part of Maj-Gen Sir John Whitelocke's force. The IoWM remained continuously embodied until the abdication of Napoleon ended the war. During that time it supplied a number of recruits to the Regular Army. The company was disembodied at Ryde on 24 June 1814 and was not called out during the short Waterloo campaign the following year.

=== Long Peace ===
Captain Delgarno died on 10 June 1818 and was succeeded by William Watkin Anwyl. During the long peace after Waterloo the militia fell into abeyance. The IoWM was called out for training in 1820, 1821 and 1831, but not thereafter. Percy Scott, a half-pay lieutenant in the 98th Foot who had served in the Peninsular War and transferred to the IoWM in 1828, was appointed captain-commandant of the disembodied unit on 20 July 1832. The unit had claimed to be a light infantry corps, and in 1846 it was granted the title of Isle of Wight Light Infantry Militia.

== Isle of Wight Artillery Militia ==
The national Militia of the United Kingdom was revived by the Militia Act 1852, enacted during a renewed period of international tension. As before, units were raised and administered on a county basis, and filled by voluntary enlistment (although conscription by means of the Militia Ballot might be used if the counties failed to meet their quotas). Training was for 56 days on enlistment, then for 21–28 days per year, during which the men received full army pay. Under the act, Militia units could be embodied by royal proclamation for full-time home defence service in three circumstances:

1. 'Whenever a state of war exists between Her Majesty and any foreign power'.
2. 'In all cases of invasion or upon imminent danger thereof'.
3. 'In all cases of rebellion or insurrection'.

The Isle of Wight Light Infantry was revived in October 1852 as a company of 80 men, still commanded by Capt Percy Scott, and the enrolled volunteers undertook training in two detachments in November and December.

The Militia Act 1852 had introduced Artillery Militia units in addition to the traditional infantry regiments. Their role was to man coastal defences and fortifications, relieving the Royal Artillery (RA) for active service. In April 1853 the IoWLI was converted into the Isle of Wight Artillery Militia, enlarged to two companies, with headquarters at Newport. The unit carried out its first annual training as artillery at Parkhurst Barracks in November that year, using two 6-pounder field guns sent over from Portsmouth. This was repeated the following year.

War having broken out with Russia and an expeditionary force sent to the Crimea, the militia began to be embodied for permanent service. The IoWAM was embodied at Newport on 1 February 1855 and the men were billet on innkeepers in the town. In July a detachment went to man the guns at Yarmouth Castle while the rest of the unit under Capt Scott went to Fort Victoria covering the Needles passage and the approaches to Yarmouth. They were the first troops to man the newly-built fort, and much of their work was to disembark gun carriages and install them on the batteries there and at Cliff End Battery, Freshwater. The Crimean War was ended by the Treaty of Paris on 30 March 1856, and the IoWAM returned to Newport on 16 June to be disembodied.

Annual training resumed at Sandown Barracks in 1858 and 1859. In October 1859 the corps was augmented by a third company. Captain Percy Scott had been promoted to major on 26 May that year, and he was promoted again to lieutenant-colonel on 9 December. A fourth company was added to the IoWAM on 3 March 1863, and the establishment was raised to 400 gunners in 1871. Annual training continued, usually at Sandown or Parkhurst Barracks, or later at Carisbrooke Castle, when the men were billeted in Newport. Gun practice was usually on the 32-pounders and 8-inch shell guns at Sandown Barrack Battery, though sometimes the gunners used light field guns to fire at floating targets in Gurnard Bay. In 1879 they were able to fire the new Rifled 40-pounder Armstrong gun. The Duke of Connaught became Honorary Colonel of the corps in 1875.

Following the Cardwell Reforms a mobilisation scheme began to appear in the Army List from December 1875. This assigned places in an order of battle of the 'Garrison Army' to Militia Artillery units: the Isle of Wight Artillery's war station was in the Portsmouth defences, which included the Isle of Wight itself.

In 1867 the Militia Reserve was introduced, consisting of present and former militiamen who undertook to serve overseas in case of war. They were called out in April 1878 during the international crisis following the Russo-Turkish War. At that date 53 men of the IoWAM were liable to service and only five failed to present themselves. After medical examination 42 were posted to batteries of the Royal Artillery. In 1881 the Fenian troubles led to a permanent guard of staff sergeants being placed on the stores at Carisbrooke Castle, and later the arms and ammunition were sent to secure armouries at Parkhurst and Sandown. The unit was issued with Martini–Henry carbines in 1884.

=== Duke of Connaught's Own ===
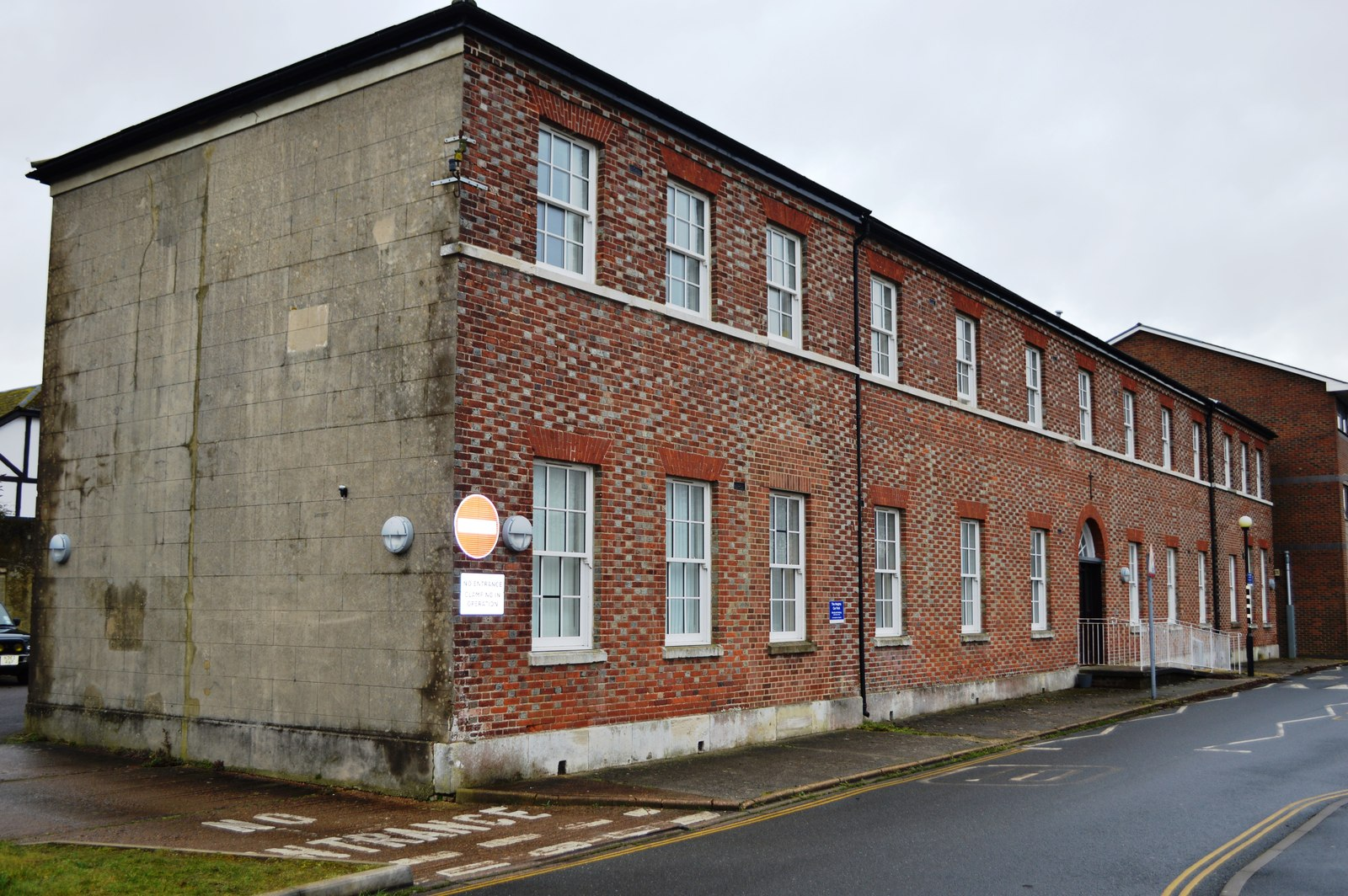
The former artillery barracks at Sandown

The Royal Artillery and Militia Artillery were reorganised on 14 April 1882, when 11 territorial divisions of garrison artillery were formed, each consisting of a number of brigades. (Note: In contemporary Royal Artillery terminology, a 'brigade' was a group of batteries brigaded together for administrative rather than tactical purposes, the officer in command normally being a lieutenant-colonel rather than a brigadier-general or major-general, the ranks usually associated with command of an infantry or cavalry brigade.) In each division the 1st Brigade was composed of Regular RA batteries, the others being a varying number of militia corps. The IoWAM joined the Southern Division, becoming 3rd Brigade, Southern Division, RA. In 1886 this was changed to 3rd (Duke of Connaught's Own) Brigade, Southern Division.

The headquarters of the brigade, which had been at Carisbrooke Castle for many years, moved to Sandown Barracks in November 1885. From 1891 it practised with the 9-inch guns at Sandown Fort and against moving targets with the 64-pounders at Yaverland Battery.

One of the intentions of the 1882 organisation into divisions had been to train the recruits centrally, and to encourage militiamen to volunteer for the Regulars. The number of men transferring to the Regular RA each year was so large that the Hampshire and Isle of Wight units could not maintain their strength. On 1 October 1891 they amalgamated to form the Duke of Connaught's Own Hampshire and Isle of Wight Artillery, of four companies. Although Lt-Col Maitland Moore-Lane of the Hampshire Artillery took command of the amalgamated brigade, its HQ was at Sandown and it continued with the Isle of Wight unit's precedence number. The two honorary colonels, the Duke of Connaught and the Duke of Wellington from the Hampshire brigade, shared the role.

During its annual training in 1891 the brigade took part in a practice mobilisation of all the defences for Portsmouth, being assigned to Sub-Section 6 of Section III (the Eastern forts of the Isle of Wight), with Col Moore-Lane as sub-section commander. Under this defence scheme the brigade manned Bembridge Fort, Redcliff Battery, Yaverland Battery, Sandown Battery and Barrack Battery during its 1894 training.

From 1899 the militia artillery formally became part of the Royal Garrison Artillery (RGA), and when the RGA abolished the divisional structure the unit took the title of Duke of Connaught's Own Hampshire and Isle of Wight RGA (Militia) on 1 January 1902.

=== Second Boer War ===
The Duke of Connaught's was embodied from 1 May to 6 November 1900 for garrison duty during the Second Boer War. The unit also volunteered for overseas service, and this offer was accepted. It formed a service company of 5 officers and 149 other ranks that went to South Africa where it was brigaded with the service company formed by the Prince of Wales's Own Norfolk Artillery. The two companies provided gun detachments for several forts and garrisoned towns. They returned to the UK after peace was declared in May 1902, the Duke of Connaught's having lost four gunners died of wounds or disease. The participants received the Queen's South Africa Medal with clasps for 'Cape Colony', 'Orange Free State', 'Transvaal', South Africa 1901', and 'South Africa 1902'.

Captain (Honorary Major) Charles Westrow Hulse of the Duke of Connaught's was killed at Braklaagte on 4 June 1901 while commanding 106th (Staffordshire) Company of the 4th Battalion, Imperial Yeomanry.

== Disbandment ==
After the Boer War, the future of the Militia was called into question. There were moves to reform the Auxiliary Forces (Militia, Yeomanry and Volunteers) to take their place in the six Army Corps proposed by St John Brodrick as Secretary of State for War. Some batteries of militia artillery were to be converted to field artillery. However, little of Brodrick's scheme was carried out.

Under the sweeping Haldane Reforms of 1908, the Militia was replaced by the Special Reserve, a semi-professional force whose role was to provide reinforcement drafts for Regular units serving overseas in wartime. Although the majority of the officers and men of the RGA (M) accepted transfer to the Special Reserve Royal Field Artillery, and the Sandown unit became the Duke of Connaught's Own Hampshire and Isle of Wight Royal Field Reserve Artillery on 24 May 1908, all these units were disbanded in March 1909. Instead the men of the RFA Special Reserve would form Brigade Ammunition Columns for the Regular RFA brigades on the outbreak of war.

== Commanders ==
=== Honorary Colonel ===
The following served as Honorary Colonel of the corps:

- Field Marshal HRH Prince Arthur, Duke of Connaught and Strathearn, appointed (to Isle of Wight Artillery) 23 July 1875
- Henry Wellesley, 3rd Duke of Wellington, appointed (to Hampshire Artillery) 22 November 1884, died 1900

=== Commandant ===
The following officers commanded the corps:

- Edward Meux Worsley, MP, captain April 1771, resigned 7 March 1782
- John Popham, lieutenant 20 April 1778, promoted to captain 8 March 1782, major 24 September 1794, resigned 13 March 1803
- John Delgarno, captain 29 July 1794, appointed commandant 19 March 1803; died 10 June 1818
- William Watkin Anwyl, captain-commandant 11 June 1818
- Percy Scott, half-pay lieutenant, captain-commandant IoWLI 20 July 1832; continued with IoWAM 20 April 1853, promoted major 26 May 1859, lt-col 9 December 1859, resigned 7 September 1867
- Leopold Grimston Paget, half-pay Lt-Col, appointed 7 September 1867, resigned 20 June 1885
- Francis Gordon Degge Watson, retired lieutenant, joined IoWAM 1859, promoted 20 June 1885
- Maitland Moore-Lane, retired Lt-Col RA, appointed (to Hampshire Artillery) 20 July 1889, continued in command of DoCH&IoW
- Henry G. Watson, promoted 24 January 1906

== Heritage & ceremonial ==
=== Uniform and insignia ===
When the militia was revived in 1757 the standard British Army red coat was used, the South Hants distinguished by yellow facings. When it was formed as an adjunct to the South Hants the Isle of Wight also wore yellow facings.

The uniform of the militia artillery conformed to that of the Regular RA, being blue with red facings, except that silver lace was worn in place of gold. The helmet plate was the RA pattern in silver, without the scroll carrying the motto 'UBIQUE'. The officers' full dress helmet after 1891 had 'HANTS & ISLE OF WIGHT ARTILLERY' on the scroll. The shoulder strap of the gunners' tunic had the curved title 'SOUTHERN" embroidered on it; after the abolition of the divisions this was replaced by 'H & I of W'. When khaki service dress was introduced after the Boer War the shoulder straps bore brass titles: 'RGA' over (curved) 'HANTS & I OF W'.

=== Precedence ===
Originally, militia regiments camped together took precedence according to the order in which they had arrived. During the War of American Independence, the counties were given an order of precedence determined by ballot each year. For Hampshire and the Isle of Wight the positions were:

- 1st on 1 June 1778
- 42nd on12 May 1779
- 3rd on 6 May 1780
- 10th on 28 April 1781
- 15th on 7 May 1782

The militia order of precedence balloted for in 1793 (Hampshire was 6th) remained in force throughout the French Revolutionary War. Another ballot for precedence took place at the start of the Napoleonic War, when Hampshire and the Isle of Wight were 15th. This order continued until 1833. In that year the King drew the lots for individual regiments and the resulting list remained in force with minor amendments until the end of the militia. The regiments raised before the peace of 1763 (including the North and South Hants) took the first 47 places: the Isle of Wight (formed after 1763) was 63rd, although most regiments paid little notice to the additional number.

When the militia artillery corps were first formed in 1853 they were assigned an order of precedence based on alphabetical order: Hampshire and the Isle of Wight were 16th and 17th. When the two units amalgamated, they took the precedence of 17th (even though the 16th place remained vacant).

=== Memorials ===
There is a marble memorial plaque in Christ Church, Sandown, to the men of the Duke of Connaught's who died during the Second Boer War.

There is a marble memorial plaque to Maj C.W. Hulse, killed at Braklaagte, in St Mary's Church, Breamore, Hampshire.

== See also ==
- Militia (English)
- Militia (Great Britain)
- Militia (United Kingdom)
- Hampshire Trained Bands
- North Hampshire Militia
- South Hampshire Light Infantry Militia
- Hampshire Militia Artillery
