= Charles Hulse (cricketer) =

English cricketer and British Army officer

Personal information
- Full name: Charles Westrow Hulse
- Born: 25 November 1860; Breamore, Hampshire, England
- Died: 4 June 1901 (aged 40); Braklaagte, Orange Free State, South Africa
- Batting: Unknown

Domestic team information
- Years: Team
- 1885: Marylebone Cricket Club

Career statistics
Competition	First-class
Matches	1
Runs scored	22
Batting average	22.00
100s/50s	–/–
Top score	22
Catches/stumpings	–/–
- Source: Cricinfo, 20 January 2021

Charles Westrow Hulse JP (25 November 1860 – 4 June 1901) was an English first-class cricketer and British Army officer.

The son of Sir Edward Hulse, 5th Baronet of the Hulse baronets, he was born at the family seat at Breamore House in Breamore, Hampshire. He was educated at Radley College, before going up to Charsley's Hall, Oxford. He was commissioned as a second lieutenant in the part-time Hampshire Militia Artillery in February 1880, which trained at Fort Rowner.

He was promoted to captain in the militia in April 1885, and in the same year he made a single appearance in first-class cricket for the Marylebone Cricket Club (MCC) against Hampshire at Southampton. Batting once in the match, he was dismissed in the MCC first innings for 22 runs by George Underdown.

Charles Hulse was granted the honorary rank of major in September 1894 in the renamed Duke of Connaught's Own Hampshire and Isle of Wight Artillery, while additionally holding the office of justice of the peace. He joined the Imperial Yeomanry in February 1901, where he was given the honorary rank of second lieutenant. Serving in the Second Boer War, he was killed in action in June 1901 at Braklaagte in the Orange Free State.
