= Thomas Thetcher =

British soldier (died 1784)

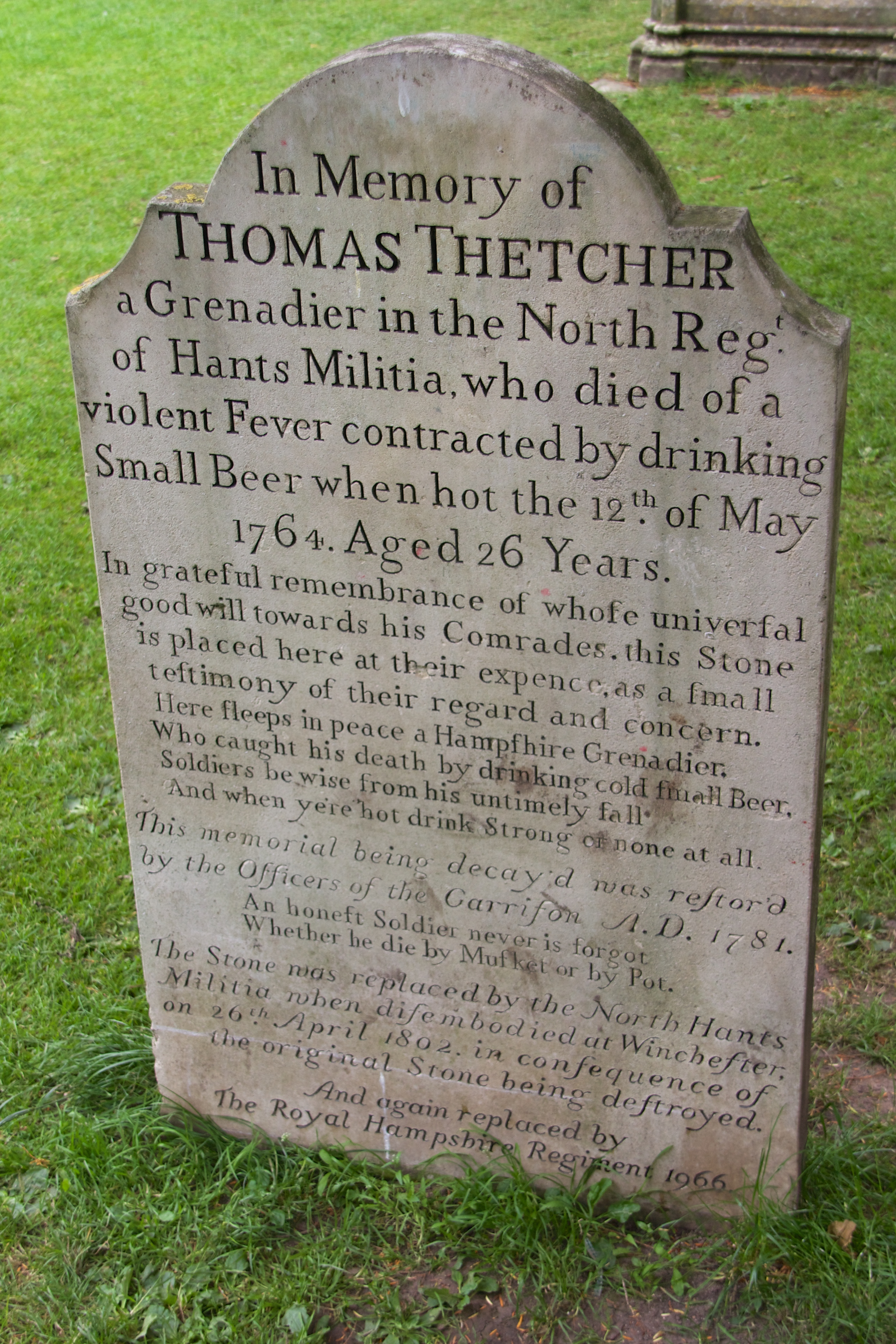
Thomas Thetcher Gravestone

Thomas Thetcher (1737? – 12th May 1764), also known simply as The Hampshire Grenadier, was a grenadier in the North Regiment of the Hants Militia. He is known to the present day only through his gravestone, which stands in the graveyard of Winchester Cathedral, Hampshire, England.

His grave site was designated as a Hampshire Treasure by the Hampshire County Council.

== Inscription text ==
In Memory of
Thomas Thetcher
a Grenadier in the North Reg. of Hants Militia, who died of
a violent Fever contracted by drinking Small Beer when hot the 12 May 1764. Aged 26 Years.

In grateful remembrance of whose universal good will towards his Comrades, this Stone is placed here at their expence, as a small testimony of their regard and concern.

Here sleeps in peace a Hampshire Grenadier,
Who caught his death by drinking cold small Beer,
Soldiers be wise from his untimely fall
And when ye're hot drink Strong or none at all.

This memorial being decay'd was restor'd by the Officers of the Garrison A.D. 1781.

An Honest Soldier never is forgot
Whether he die by Musket or by Pot.

The Stone was replaced by the North Hants Militia when disembodied at Winchester, on 26 April 1802, in consequence of the original Stone being destroyed.

And again replaced by The Royal Hampshire Regiment 1966.

== Citations ==
Grenadier Thetcher's gravestone has been quoted and misquoted extensively in the centuries since his death.

- Bill W., author of Alcoholics Anonymous (1939), the book which inspired the modern spiritual alcoholism recovery movement of the same name, quotes/paraphrases the first and last parts of the gravestone on the first page, writing:
  We landed in England. I visited Winchester Cathedral. Much moved, I wandered outside. My attention was caught by a doggerel on an old tombstone: 'Here lies a Hampshire Grenadier / Who caught his death / Drinking cold small beer. / A good soldier is ne'er forgot / Whether he dieth by musket / Or by pot.'"
- Writer Augustus Hare quotes the inscription in the appendix of his Epitaphs for Country Churchyards (1856).
- A dialogue of letters in the New England Journal of Medicine (Vol. 341, No. 17, 1999) cites the inscription as a closing to a discussion of "deglutition syncope", the medical term for fainting when swallowing. It is triggered in certain sensitive individuals by cold liquids in the esophagus, especially on hot days.
- Strongs of Romsey, a Hampshire brewing company, used the slogan "drink Strong or none at all" until the 1970s.
- A reader of Littell's Living Age, a weekly periodical distributed in America from 1844–1941, sent in the full inscription for inclusion in the 8 November 1866 issue, along with a commentary. The unnamed reader wonders "that it has not hitherto appeared". He or she was very resourceful:
  I copied it from an inscription on a tombstone in the churchyard of Winchester Cathedral, and a military friend then quartered there informed me that a statement once appeared in Fraser's Magazine to the effect that the quatrain commencing "Here sleeps in peace", was written by Dr. Benjamin Hoadley, sometime Bishop of Winchester. Now, as Bishop Hoadley died 17 April 1761, it is plain that he could not have written an epitaph on a person who survived him more than three years.
  I have divided the lines exactly as they appear on the tombstone, and beg to direct your attention to the ambiguity of "when hot", which might apply to the "beer" or to its victim; also to the disembodiment of the North Hants Militia in April, 1802, being assignable (owing to the "obscure language")[sic] to the destruction of "the original stone", and not to the peace of Amiens, which was ratified in March, 1802. The inference drawn by the poet that the grenadier was killed by the smallness of the beer, and not by its want of caloric, is, as original as it is, doubtless correct.

== See also ==
- Small beer
