= George Underdown =

English cricketer

Personal information
- Born: 12 May 1859; Petersfield, Hampshire, England
- Died: 29 May 1895 (aged 36); Petersfield, Hampshire, England

Domestic team information
- Years: Team
- 1881–1885: Hampshire

Career statistics
Competition	First-class
Matches	10
Runs scored	231
Batting average	12.83
100s/50s	0/1
Top score	63
Balls bowled	124
Wickets	1
Bowling average	80.00
5 wickets in innings	0
10 wickets in match	0
Best bowling	1/15
Catches/stumpings	3/–
- Source: Cricinfo, 11 December 2009

George Underdown (12 May 1859 — 29 May 1895) was an English first-class cricketer.

Underdown was born at Petersfield in May 1859. He played his club cricket in the town for Petersfield Cricket Club, serving as its assistant-secretary by 1880. As an amateur, he made his debut in first-class cricket for a United Eleven, captained by W. G. Grace, against the touring Australians at Chichester in 1882. Underdown began playing first-class cricket for Hampshire in 1883, representing the county in nine first-class matches prior to them losing first-class status at the end of the 1885 season. Across ten first-class matches, Underdown scored 231 runs at an average of 12.83, with one half century score of 63. His only first-class wicket, that of Charles Hulse, came against the Marylebone Cricket Club at Southampton in 1885.

Outside of cricket, Underdown was an ironmonger in Petersfield. He died at Petersfield in May 1895, aged 36.
