= South Hampshire Light Infantry Militia =

Auxiliary unit of the British Army

- Active: 3 October 1759–27 December 1853
- Country: Kingdom of Great Britain (1759–1800); United Kingdom (1801–1853)
- Branch: Militia
- Role: Infantry
- Size: 1 Battalion
- Garrison/HQ: Portsmouth

Commanders
- Notable commanders: Col Sir Richard Worsley, 7th Baronet; Lt-Col Edward Gibbon; Col William Mitford

The South Hampshire Light Infantry Militia (or colloquially the 'South Hants Militia') was an auxiliary military regiment in the county of Hampshire on England's South Coast. First organised during the Seven Years' War it carried out internal security and home defence duties in all of Britain's major wars until 1853.

== Background ==
The universal obligation to military service in the Shire levy was long established in England and its legal basis was updated by two Acts of 1557, which placed them under the command of Lords Lieutenant appointed by the monarch. This is seen as the starting date for the organised county militia in England. From 1572 selected men were given regular training as the 'Trained Bands'. These were an important element in the country's defence at the time of the Spanish Armada in the 1580s: the Hampshire and Isle of Wight TBs would have been in the front line in the event of invasion. Control of the militia was one of the areas of dispute between King Charles I and Parliament that led to the English Civil War. Although hardly employed during the civil wars, the Hampshire Trained Bands were active in controlling the country under the Commonwealth and Protectorate. The English militia was re-established under local control in 1662 after the Restoration of the monarchy, and Hampshire supported six regiments of foot, with independent companies in Southampton and Winchester, two Troops of horse, and a regiment of foot on the Isle of Wight. The Hampshire Militia was called out during the Monmouth Rebellion. However, after the Peace of Utrecht in 1715 the militia was allowed to decline.

== South Hampshire Militia ==
Under threat of French invasion during the Seven Years' War a series of Militia Acts from 1757 reorganised the county militia regiments, the men being conscripted by means of parish ballots (paid substitutes were permitted) to serve for three years. In peacetime they assembled for 28 days' annual training. There was a property qualification for officers, who were commissioned by the lord lieutenant. An adjutant and drill sergeants were to be provided to each regiment from the Regular Army, and arms and accoutrements would be supplied when the county had secured 60 per cent of its quota of recruits.

Hampshire was given a quota of 960 men to raise in two regiments with an independent company on the Isle of Wight. The North Regiment had been formed by 14 September 1759, when its arms were ordered to be issued, and the South Regiment by 3 October 1759. The Lord Lieutenant of Hampshire, Lieutenant-General Charles Powlett, 5th Duke of Bolton, took personal command of the North Regiment as Colonel. Alexander Thistlethwayte, MP for Hampshire, was nominal colonel of the South Regiment (having apparently been a militia colonel since 1741), with Sir Thomas Worsley, 6th Baronet as his Lieutenant-Colonel. The regimental agent complained that neither Thistlethwaite not Bolton had been issued with a formal commission. The secretary of state for war regarded the two Hampshire regiments as battalions of a single regiment under the direct command of the Duke, who tried to take over as colonel of the South Regiment in 1760. Worsley firmly resisted the Duke's efforts to secure control of both regiments. Legal opinion pointed out that the Act prohibited lords-lieutenant from commanding more than one regiment, and that with eight companies the South Hampshires were a full regiment and not a battalion. It seems that a compromise was reached in 1762 when the Duke was appointed Brigadier-General of Hampshire Militia, while Worsley was established as Lt-Col Commandant of the South Regiment. Among other officers appointed in 1759, Edward Gibbon Sr was the Major, and his son the future historian Edward Gibbon Jr was Captain of the Grenadier Company.

The South regiment was ordered to be embodied for permanent duty at Southampton on 12 May 1760, although the Duke of Bolton actually assembled it at Winchester on 3 June before it marched to Blandford in Dorset. It was quartered there until the end of August when it was stationed at Gosport Hospital. In October the two Hampshire regiments camped together outside Portsmouth while Hilsea Barracks were being cleaned. In November the South Hampshires marched under Lt-Col Worsley to winter quarters at Maidstone in Kent, with a 200-strong detachment guarding French prisoners-of-war at Sissinghurst. At the end of December the regiment was moved to Dover and Deal, Kent, where as the younger Gibbon related, 'On the beach at Dover we exercised in sight of the Gallic shores'. At the end of May 1761 the South Hants were issued with tents and ordered to Winchester, where they joined a large militia encampment under Lt-Gen the Earl of Effingham. The younger Gibbon considered that the regiment benefited greatly from the combined training and field days at this camp and the following year he applied unsuccessfully to be Effingham's Brigade major at the camp. The regiment left camp on 15 October 1761 and marched to Devizes in Wiltshire for the winter. The following year the regiment was ordered on 27 May to march as two 'divisions' to Southampton, and then provided a 250-strong detachment to guard French prisoners at Fareham and Forton. However, the detachment was too small for the duty, and a 130-man detachment from the North Hampshires was sent from Winchester Camp to reinforce it. The detachment returned to Southampton in July when that year's newly-balloted recruits were being integrated in to the regiment, but it went back to Fareham and Forton in October, while the rest of the regiment went to Gosport and Haslar Hospital.

By the end of 1762 a peace treaty was being negotiated. Lieutenant-Col Worsley was ordered to call in his detachments, and the regiment was disembodied on 23 December 1762, Maj Gibbon's company being paid off at Buriton and his son's Grenadier Company at Alton. The younger Gibbon recorded that 'the few men of property' among the officers welcomed the demobilisation, but that it was bad news for the junior officers, many of whom had little money.

The disembodied militia remained in existence, the adjutant, sergeants and drummers retaining their positions and pay, and the officers and balloted men assembling in May each year from 1766 onwards for training (though young Gibbon thought the peacetime training to be useless). A few officers were commissioned or promoted during the years of peace, the younger Gibbon rising to Lt-Col before he resigned in 1770.

=== American War of Independence ===
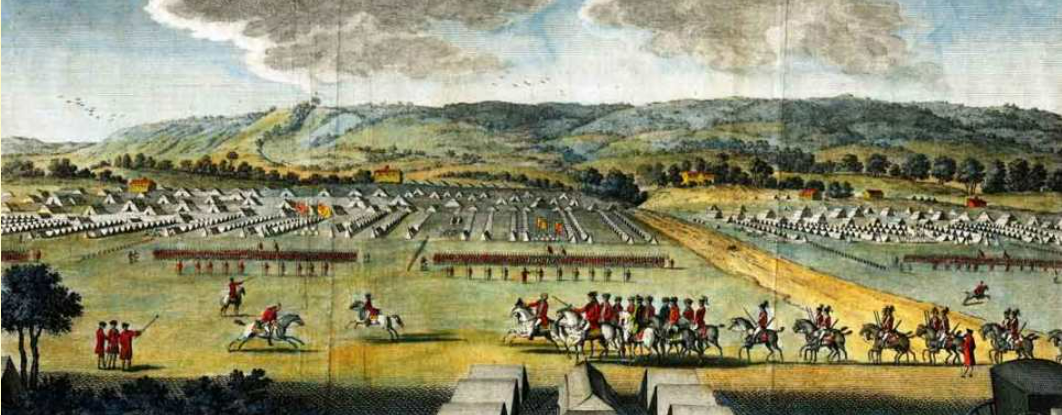
Coxheath Camp in 1778.

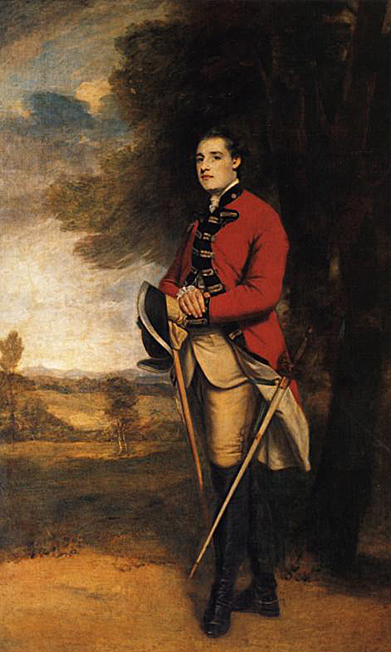
Sir Richard Worsley, 7th Baronet, in the uniform of the South Hampshire Militia, painted by Sir Joshua Reynolds ca 1776–6.

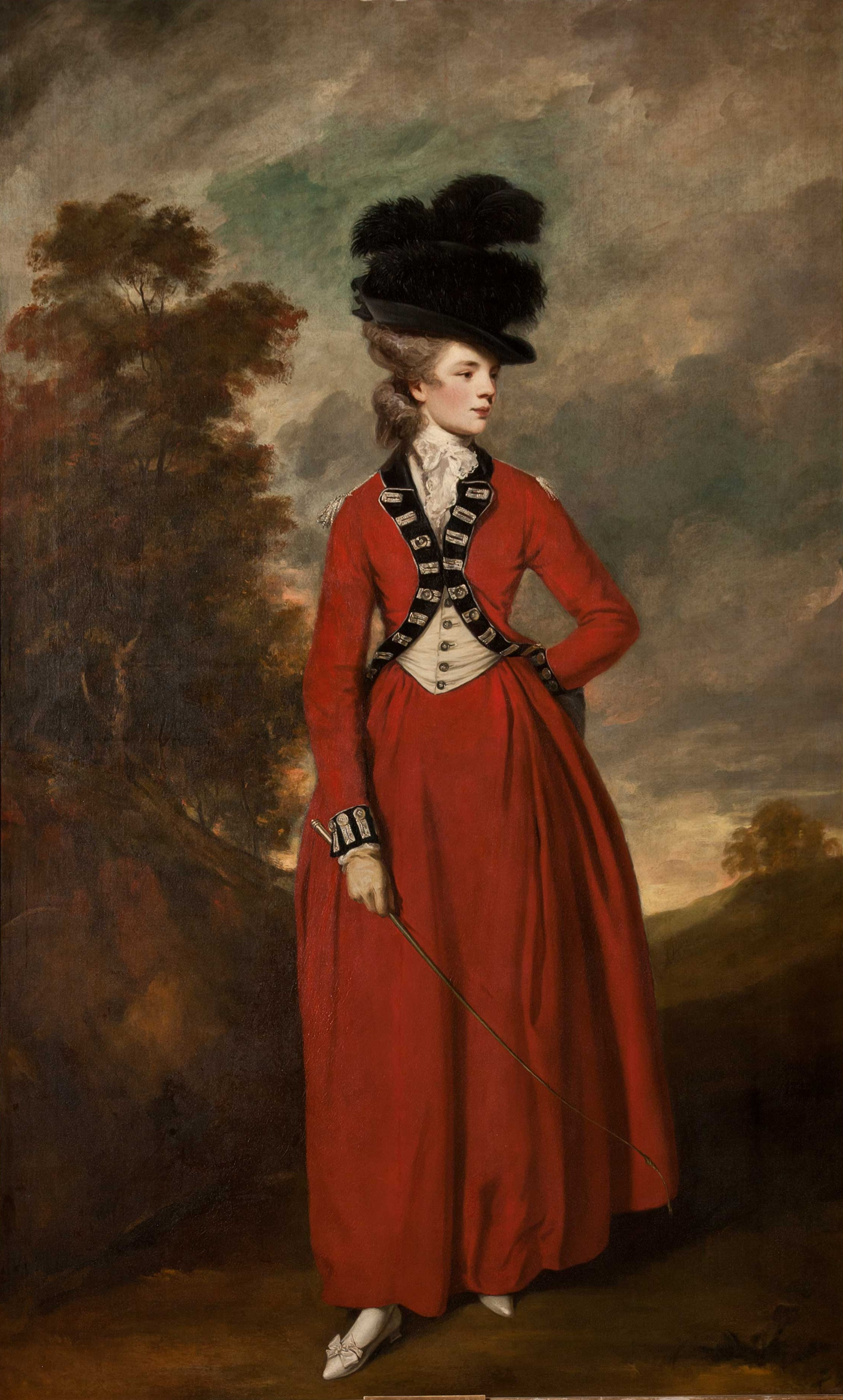
Portrait of Lady Worsley by Reynolds, 1779. Lady Worsley in a riding habit adapted from the uniform of her husband's regiment, which she wore at Coxheath Camp.

The militia was called out on 28 March 1778 during the War of American Independence when the country was threatened with invasion by the Americans' allies, France and Spain. The South Hampshire regiment with seven companies was embodied at Southampton in April under the command of Col Sir Simeon Stuart, 3rd Baronet, MP, and then marched to Chichester, Sussex, on 1 May. Before leaving Southampton the regiment had been inoculated against smallpox (Variolation) and the people of Chichester were frightened by the men showing mild symptoms of the disease, demanding that the militiamen should be quarantined. At the end of May the regiment was on duty to prevent rioting as the Sussex magistrates carried out the militia ballot. Parliament permitted the addition of one company raised by voluntary enlistment to supplement the balloted men in each regiment, bringing the South Hampshire up to eight companies.

On 12 June the South Hampshire Militia under Col Stuart marched in two divisions to Coxheath Camp near Maidstone, the army's largest training camp, where the completely raw Militia were exercised as part of a division alongside Regular troops while providing a reserve in case of French invasion of South East England. In November the regiment returned to winter quarters in small towns across Hampshire. The following spring the South Hants crossed to the Isle of Wight, relieving the North Hants, who returned to the mainland. The regiment was stationed at Newport and Carisbrooke Castle with 2 companies detached to Cowes. Sir Simeon Stuart died in November 1779 and was succeeded as colonel by Maj Sir Richard Worsley, 7th Baronet, son of Sir Thomas.

On 19 May 1780 the South Hants received orders to return to the mainland, sailing to Portsmouth and then marching via London to camp at Danbury, Essex. However, on 6 June the regiment was halted at Lambeth to assist in suppressing the Gordon Riots. It joined the North Hants and four other militia regiments at a camp in Hyde Park facing Park Lane. The riots having died down, the Park Lane camp was broken up on 10 August, but the South Hants remained close to London in camp on Finchley Common. On 16 October the regiment was sent into winter quarters across Buckinghamshire and Hertfordshire. It went to Coxheath Camp again in 1781, the companies beginning their concentration in April, and arriving at the camp on 7 June, where the South Hants remained until 2 November. The winter quarters for 1781–82 were scattered across Sussex in towns and villages around Lewes, Uckfield, Hastings and Eastbourne. They were ordered to aid the Revenue officers in anti-smuggling duties. On 21 February 1782 all the detachments were ordered to Hilsea Barracks, Portsmouth. By the beginning of 1783 a peace was being negotiated and the militia could be stood down. The South Hampshire Militia was disembodied at Southampton on 12 March.

From 1784 to 1792 the militia were assembled for their 28 days' annual peacetime training, but to save money only two-thirds of the men were actually mustered each year.

=== French Revolutionary War ===
On 5 December 1792 the 6th Duke of Bolton, as lord-lieutenant, was ordered to recall the militiamen of the county who had already been trained in May that year. Once they had assembled for a 20-day embodiment, it was changed to permanent service. Thus a portion of the militia was already under arms before Revolutionary France declared war on Britain on 1 February 1793. On 29 January the South Hampshire Militia was 259 strong, needing 182 men to complete its establishment.

The French Revolutionary Wars saw a new phase for the English militia: they were embodied for a whole generation, and became regiments of full-time professional soldiers (though restricted to service in the British Isles), which the regular army increasingly saw as a prime source of recruits. They served in coast defences, manned garrisons, guarded prisoners of war, and carried out internal security duties, while their traditional local defence duties were taken over by the Volunteers and mounted Yeomanry.

After the outbreak of war the regiment was sent to Portsmouth and on 8 August 1793 it was at Gosport Barracks with 7 companies. It spent the winter quartered at Lymington and Christchurch. Once again a volunteer company was added to the regiment, on 29 April 1794, at county expense. That summer the regiment was quartered in the towns and villages of East Kent.

During the French Revolutionary War the militia were frequently collected in large encampments for summer training alongside regular troops. From August until November 1794 the South Hants was at Priory Camp and was then ordered to the infantry barracks at Canterbury. From March 1795 the South Hants were in camp on Barham Downs outside Canterbury, where they were brigaded with the South Devon, 1st Somerset and West Yorkshire Militia. The South Hants and Somerset Militia were reviewed at nearby Harbledown that summer. The South Hants returned to Portsmouth on 31 October, then the following May five companies went to Rye and Winchelsea Barracks, and three to Hastings and Bo-Peep Barracks, all in Sussex, leaving those towns when elections were held.

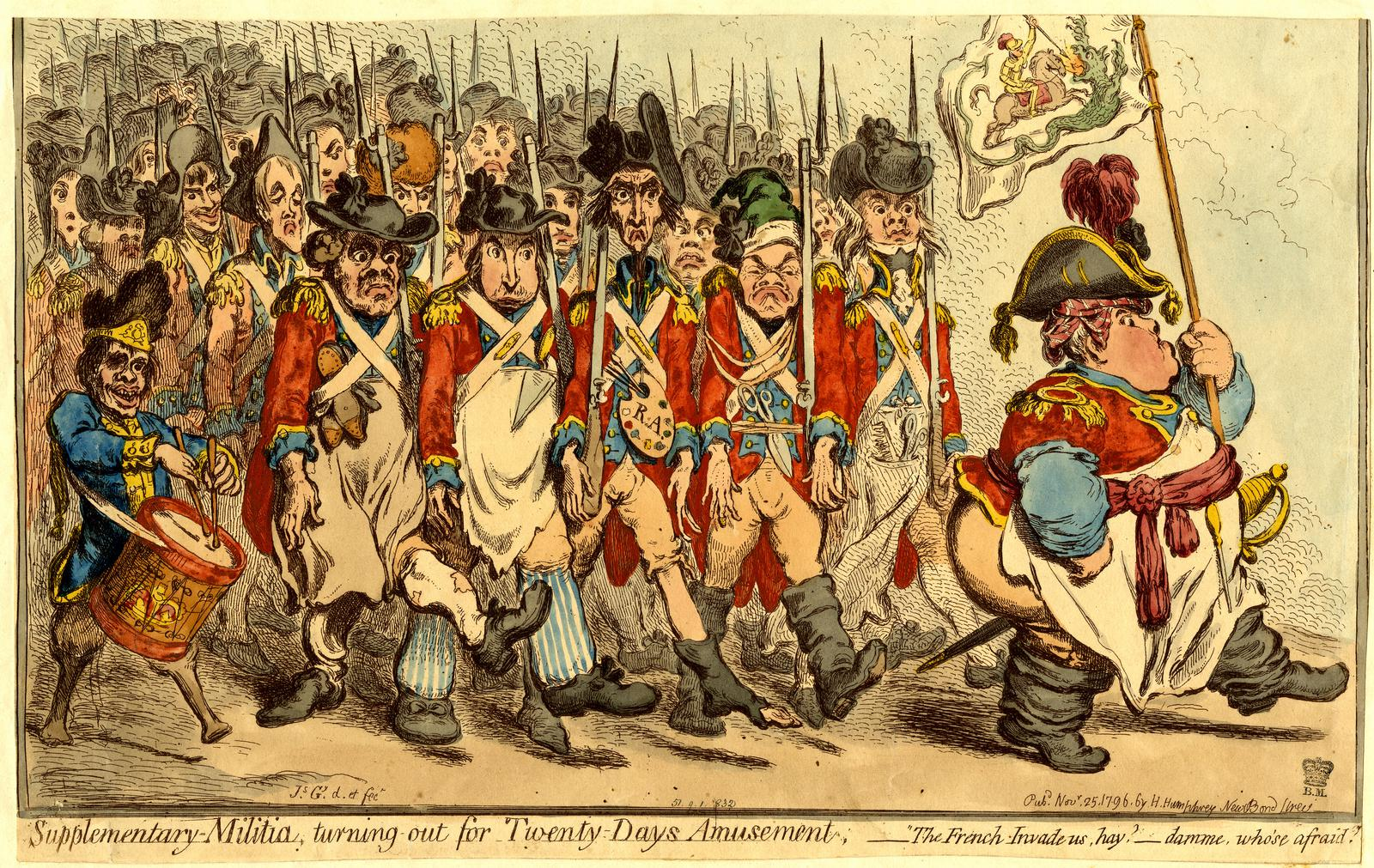
Supplementary-Militia, turning-out for Twenty Days Amusement: 1796 caricature by James Gillray.

That winter the Government created the Supplementary Militia, a compulsory levy of men to be trained in their spare time, and to be incorporated in the Militia in emergency. The men from the county subdivisions of Southampton, Portsdown, Alton North and South, and New Forest East and West were attached to the South Hants. The county lieutenancies were required to carry out 20 days' initial training as soon as possible and detachments of the regiment were sent to drill them in four batches.

At this time part of the regiment was guarding French prisoners at Lymington. When these duties were completed in June, the South Hants concentrated in summer camp at Battle, East Sussex. In November 1797 its winter quarters were at Lewes Barracks, forming a brigade with the Bedfordshire Militia. Early in 1798 the detachment left at Winchester was sent out on recruiting duty for the 55th Foot. In February the Supplementary Militia was called out for permanent service and a detachment of the South Hants men were sent from Winchester to reinforce the 'old' regiment at Lewes. In May the regiment returned to Winchester, where it absorbed the rest of the South Hants supplementaries, forming an additional company, before moving on to Gosport to relieve the North Hants. By the summer the regiment had 10 companies, but the Light Company was detached to a battalion formed at Winchester with the light companies of the Berkshire, Cheshire and Shropshire Militia. During the summer a fight broke out at Portsmouth between men of the South Hants Militia and the Royal Artillery, and the riot was only suppressed when nine men were arrested.

By 1799 the threat of invasion seemed to have receded and in July the Supplementary Militia was stood down, the surplus men being encouraged to transfer to the Regular Army. At the beginning of the month the strength of the regiment (excluding officers and non-commissioned officers (NCOs)) had been 426 men paid by the King (32 short of establishment), 106 volunteers raised by the county (48 short), and 356 supplementaries (104 short). The disembodiment of the supplementaries reduced this, and the regiment was further reduced by Act of Parliament in October to an establishment of just 256 men in five companies. This was achieved by transfers to the Regulars and by disembodiment of surplus men. The reduced regiment crossed from Portsmouth to the Isle of Wight from in October and returned in April 1800, landing at Lymington and marching to Maker Heights above Plymouth. From April 1801 the companies marched from place to place around Cornwall. In September a number of the South Hants supplementaries were re-embodied at Ringwood and marched to join the regiment at Truro. Then at the end of October the regiment was moved back to Ringwood and Fordingbridge (later Poole and Wimborne) for the winter.

The Treaty of Amiens was signed in March, ending the war, and on 12 April the South Hampshire Militia at Ringwood received the order to disembody. The regiment marched to Southampton and carried this out on 30 April.

=== Napoleonic Wars ===
The Peace of Amiens was short-lived and the South Hants were called out again on 11 March 1803, completing their embodiment at Southampton on 25 March, with an initial establishment of 430 all ranks in five companies. Britain declared war on France once more on 18 May 1803 and the regiment was ordered to Lewes Barracks. On 11 June the supplementaries were called out as well, adding 227 all ranks in two additional companies. The regiment marched from Lewes to Brighton Camp on 15 July, and on 1 August the supplementaries were ordered to join there. The regiment wintered at Blatchington Barracks from November until March 1804, when it moved back to Lewes. That summer it was at Langley camp near Eastbourne before returning to Lewes in November. During the autumn the men were permitted to help local farmers with their harvest.

William Mitford, who had been Lt-Col since 1779, resigned in May 1804 and Lt-Col Peter Serle, a former captain in the regiment who had raised and commanded the Eling & Millbrook Volunteers, was appointed to succeed him. Colonel Sir Richard Worsley died in 1805 and Mitford was brought back to succeed him, but resigned again the following year, when Serle was appointed Lt-Col Commandant. Proposals to amalgamate the two small Hampshire regiments (the South Hants had been reduced to 365 privates in five companies in July 1805) came to nothing and Serle was promoted to Colonel in 1808.

During the summer of 1805, when Napoleon was massing his 'Army of England' at Boulogne for a projected invasion, the regiment (307 effectives under Lt-Col Serle) was sharing Lewes Barracks with the Dorset and Royal Monmouthshire regiments, forming Maj-Gen William Houston's brigade. One morning two young officers of the South Hants fought a duel with pistols at Houndean Bottom near Lewes; their seconds ended the affair after one of the officers was wounded. The South Hants spent the winter of 1805–06 quartered in Sussex, first at Winchelsea, then Hailsham, and finally Shoreham. In August 1806 it moved to Littlehampton Barracks, and then crossed from Portsmouth to the Isle of Wight in October. It returned to the mainland in May 1807 and then marched from Southampton to Weymouth, Dorset. During the summer 75 men of the South Hants volunteered to transfer to the Regulars, but were more than replaced by a new batch of balloted men, bringing the regiment up to 439 privates. In November the regiment marched via Littlehampton back to Shoreham Barracks for the winter, moving to Hailsham the following February. It was at Bexhill-on-Sea from the summer of 1808, where there was more volunteering for the Regulars, and the regiment sent recruiting parties out into Hampshire to obtain enough volunteers to replace them. In June 1809 the South Hants moved to Devonshire, via Exeter to Berry Head Barracks and on to Kingsbridge Barracks. Detachments did duty on Dartmoor, where prisoners-of-war were building the Prison. In June 1810 the regiment moved to Maker Heights, where it remained for a year before being stationed at Exeter from May 1811, where the duties included escorting prisoners of war to Dartmoor and Bristol.

=== South Hampshire Light Infantry ===
In 1807 Lt-Col Serle had offered the South Hants for conversion into a rifle regiment, on the grounds that many of the men were from the New Forest and the Forest of Bere and were expert marksmen. Nothing came of his proposal then, but on 20 June 1811 orders were issued for the regiment to become Light Infantry. The drummers received bugles and Sergeant Joel Bennett was sent to Kent for attachment to the 52nd Light Infantry and later to the 95th Rifles and 85th Light Infantry, to study light infantry drill and training. After 9 months he returned to the regiment and put his findings into practice, putting the companies through the new drill.

The Luddite riots in Northern England became serious in 1812, and the government concentrated the militia to deal with the situation. The South Hants LI left Exeter in April 1812 for Weedon Barracks, Northamptonshire, travelling in hired carts and completing the 170 miles (270 km) journey in 5 days. It then travelled on to Sheffield. After a month it was sent on to Wakefield, and then from August it was deployed in three 'divisions' across Lancashire at Colne, Blackburn and Lancaster, where regimental headquarters was established.

In April 1813 the regiment was ordered to Scotland and it marched via Carlisle to Dunbar Barracks where it was housed for the next year. In September the recruits were marched from Hampshire to London to await passage to Scotland aboard coasting vessels. Volunteering for the regiments of the line became even more important as the Peninsular War neared its end: that winter the South Hants LI supplied 114 volunteers, of whom 75 went to the 52nd LI. The men were marched to Leith to board ship for Tilbury Fort before joining their regiments.

In February 1814 the regiment moved to Musselburgh Barracks, where the duties included guarding Penicuik Prison. While the regiment was at Musselburgh news arrived that Napoleon had abdicated and the war was over. On 27 and 31 May the South Hants embarked in two divisions in small ships at Leith and landed at Gravesend on 2 and 5 June before marching to Portsmouth. It was stationed at Hilsea Barracks and Fort Monckton while numerous foreign dignitaries visited and French prisoners of war were released. It then marched to Southampton where it was disembodied on 16 July.

Early in 1815 Napoleon escaped from Elba and the militia was re-embodied. The warrant for calling out the South Hants was issued on 16 June, but the Battle of Waterloo had been fought by the time the regiment assembled on 10 July. Nevertheless it was ordered to continue recruiting. On 31 July it moved to Gosport Old Barracks and on 6 December it embarked for service in Ireland. However, bad weather prevented the ships from sailing and it disembarked next day. The warrant for disembodying the regiment was received on 15 January 1816, and this was carried out on 1 February.

=== Long Peace ===
After Waterloo there was another long peace. Although officers continued to be commissioned into the militia and ballots were still held, the regiments were rarely assembled for training: the South Hampshire Militia was embodied for training at Southampton in 1820, 1821 and 1825, but not again until 1831, and never thereafter. Colonel Serle died on 26 September 1826, but it was not until 25 June 1827 that Lt-Col Sir John Pollen, 2nd Baronet, MP, of Redenham Park, was promoted to succeed him. The permanent staff of NCOs and buglers (who were occasionally used to maintain public order) was progressively reduced. Sergeant (Sergeant-Major since 1818) Bennett was commissioned as Quartermaster in 1831, and had to take over as acting adjutant and paymaster of the disembodied staff as well in 1844. In 1845–46 there was an effort to replace elderly members of the permanent staff and to appoint a few younger officers from the county gentry, though they had no duties to perform.

== 1852 Reforms and disbandment ==
The Militia of the United Kingdom was revived by the Militia Act 1852, enacted during a renewed period of international tension. As before, units were raised and administered on a county basis, and filled by voluntary enlistment (although conscription by means of the Militia Ballot might be used if the counties failed to meet their quotas). Training was for 21–28 days per year, during which the men received full army pay.

On 14 December 1852 the reformed South Hampshire Light Infantry was ordered to assemble for training at Southampton on 1 February 1853. Although it was still short of officers and some NCOs, it had filled its establishment of 479 privates. It was disembodied after a 21-day training period and was never re-assembled again. The 1852 Act had introduced Artillery Militia units in addition to the traditional infantry regiments. Their role was to man coastal defences and fortifications, relieving the Royal Artillery for active service. The Isle of Wight Light Infantry Militia was converted into Artillery Militia in April 1853 and the Government decided to form another regiment on the Hampshire mainland to guard the approaches to Portsmouth. On 27 December 1853 the South Hampshire Light Infantry Militia merged with North Hampshire Militia (henceforth simply the 'Hampshire Militia'), while 3 officers and 386 other ranks transferred from the South Hants to form the new Hampshire Militia Artillery at Portsmouth. Colonel Pollen and Quartermaster Bennett retired on the amalgamation. The Hampshire and Isle of Wight artillery militia units merged in 1891 to form the Duke of Connaught's Own Hampshire and Isle of Wight Artillery, which was based on the Isle of Wight. All the artillery militia was disbanded in 1908.

== Colonels ==
The following officers commanded the regiment:

- Sir Thomas Worsley, 6th Baronet, Lt-Col Commandant from formation, died 1768
- Sir Simeon Stuart, 3rd Baronet, MP, Colonel, died 19 November 1779
- Sir Richard Worsley, 7th Baronet, Colonel 22 November 1779, died 8 August 1805
- William Mitford, Capt 1771, Lt-Col 1779, resigned 3 May 1804; re-appointed as Col 2 September 1805, resigned 15 October 1806
- Peter Serle, Capt 2 January 1786, Lt-Col 4 May 1804, Lt-Col Commandant 16 October 1806, Col 19 January 1808, died 26 September 1826
- Sir John Pollen, 2nd Baronet, MP, Capt 21 February 1810, Maj North Hants 4 August 1812, Lt-Col South Hants 2 June 1814, Col 25 June 1827 to disbandment

=== Other notable officers ===
- Edward Gibbon Sr, Maj from formation, later Lt-Col, died 1770
- Edward Gibbon Jr, historian, commanded the Grenadier Company 1760–62 as Capt later Lt-Col, resigned
- Sir Simeon Stuart, 4th Baronet, Capt 1 December 1779
- The Hon Coulson Wallop, MP, commissioned as Capt to command the volunteer company added in 1794; given command of one of the established companies the following year; resigned 1799
- John Willis Fleming, Capt 21 June 1803, Lt-Col 19 January 1810, resigned 24 March 1813
- Edward Hulse (later Sir Edward Hulse, 5th Baronet) Lt-Col 22 March 1831

== Heritage & Ceremonial ==
=== Uniforms & Insignia ===
When the Hampshire Militia was reformed in 1759, the facings on its red coats were black. Sir Joshua Reynolds painted Sir Richard Worsley in his uniform with black facings. He also painted Portrait of Lady Worsley showing Lady Worsley in a matching riding habit with black facings that she wore at Coxheath Camp in 1778. At some point between 1778 and 1800 the South Hampshire Militia changed to yellow facings. The Supplementary Militia attached to the South Hants in 1798 also wore yellow facings. The amalgamated regiment in 1853 adopted black.

=== Precedence ===
In the Seven Years' War militia regiments camped together took precedence according to the order in which they had arrived. During the War of American Independence the counties were given an order of precedence determined by ballot each year. For Hampshire the positions were:

- 1st on 1 June 1778
- 42nd on12 May 1779
- 3rd on 6 May 1780
- 10th on 28 April 1781
- 15th on 7 May 1782

The militia order of precedence balloted for in 1793 (Hampshire was 6th) remained in force throughout the French Revolutionary War. Another ballot for precedence took place at the start of the Napoleonic War, when Hampshire was 15th.This order continued until 1833. In that year the King drew the lots for individual regiments. The regiments raised before the peace of 1763 took the first 47 places: the North Hampshire was 13th and the South Hampshire was 43rd, although most regiments paid little notice to the number. In 1855, with a number of new units and others converted into artillery, the list was revised: the combined North and South Hampshires was considered a new unit and given the precedence of 122nd, despite the protestations of the regiment.

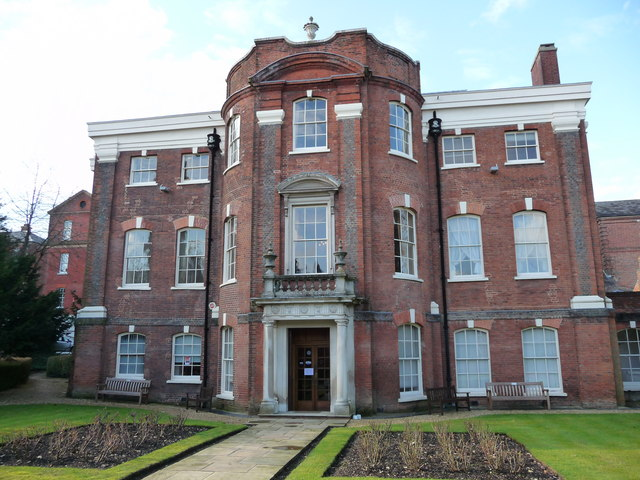
Serle's House, former Regimental HQ, now the Royal Hampshire Regiment Museum.

=== Memorials ===
Colonel Peter Serle had sold his house on Southgate Street in Winchester to the government in 1796. Serle's House became the headquarters first of his Eling and Millbrook Volunteers and then of the South Hampshire Militia. During the 19th Century it was used as judges' lodgings for the Assize Court, and then as the Lower Barracks were developed in that part of the city it served as the barrackmaster's residence, officers' married quarters and the officers' mess. In 1881 it became the HQ of the 3rd (Hampshire Militia) Battalion, Hampshire Regiment and of the 37th Regimental district, and later the Regimental HQ of the Hampshire Regiment. It is now in use as the Royal Hampshire Regiment Museum and Memorial Garden.

== See also ==
- Militia (Great Britain)
- Militia (United Kingdom)
- Hampshire Militia
- North Hampshire Militia
- Isle of Wight Militia
- Hampshire Militia Artillery
