= North Hampshire Militia =

Auxiliary unit of the British Army

North Hampshire Militia Hampshire Militia 3rd Battalion, Hampshire Regiment
- Active: 14 September 1759–April 1953
- Country: Great Britain (1759–1800); United Kingdom (1801–1953)
- Branch: Militia
- Role: Infantry
- Size: 1 Battalion
- Part of: Hampshire Regiment
- Garrison/HQ: Winchester

The North Hampshire Militia (or colloquially the 'North Hants Militia') was an auxiliary military regiment in the county of Hampshire on England's South Coast. First organised during the Seven Years' War it carried out internal security and home defence duties in all of Britain's major wars. It later absorbed the South Hampshire Militia and became a battalion of the Hampshire Regiment, supplying thousands of recruits to the fighting battalions during World War I. After 1921 the militia had only a shadowy existence until its final abolition in 1953.

== Background ==
The universal obligation to military service in the Shire levy was long established in England and its legal basis was updated by two Acts of 1557, which placed them under the command of Lords Lieutenant appointed by the monarch. This is seen as the starting date for the organised county militia in England. From 1572 selected men were given regular training as the 'Trained Bands'. These were an important element in the country's defence at the time of the Spanish Armada in the 1580s: the Hampshire and Isle of Wight TBs would have been in the front line in the event of invasion. Control of the militia was one of the areas of dispute between King Charles I and Parliament that led to the English Civil War. Although hardly employed during the civil wars, the Hampshire Trained Bands were active in controlling the country under the Commonwealth and Protectorate. The English militia was re-established under local control in 1662 after the Restoration of the monarchy, and Hampshire supported six regiments of foot, with independent companies in Southampton and Winchester, two Troops of horse, and two regiments and a company of foot on the Isle of Wight. The Hampshire Militia was called out during the Monmouth Rebellion. However, after the Peace of Utrecht in 1715 the militia was allowed to decline.

== 1757 Reforms ==
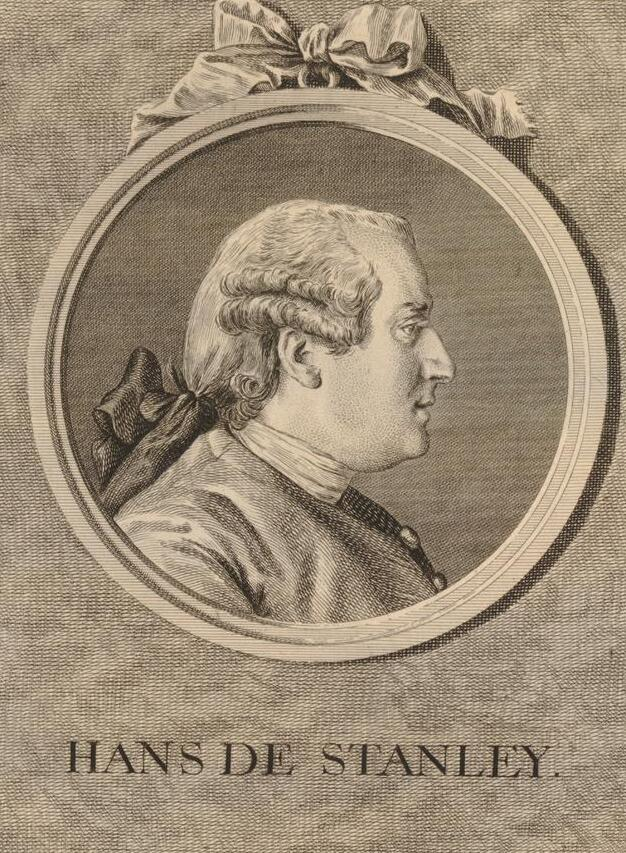
Hans Stanley, a colonel in the North Hampshire Militia from 1759 to 1761

Under threat of French invasion during the Seven Years' War a series of Militia Acts from 1757 reorganised the county militia regiments, the men being conscripted by means of parish ballots (paid substitutes were permitted) to serve for three years. In peacetime they assembled for 28 days' annual training. There was a property qualification for officers, who were commissioned by the lord lieutenant. An adjutant and drill sergeants were to be provided to each regiment from the Regular Army, and arms and accoutrements would be supplied when the county had secured 60 per cent of its quota of recruits.

Hampshire was given a quota of 960 men to raise in two regiments with an independent company on the Isle of Wight. The North Regiment of eight companies had been formed by 14 September 1759, when its arms were ordered to be issued, and by 19 October a sergeant and 20 experienced privates from regiments of the Line had been assigned to be sergeants. The South Regiment was formed by 3 October. The Lord Lieutenant of Hampshire, Lieutenant-General Charles Powlett, 5th Duke of Bolton, commissioned Hans Stanley, Member of Parliament (MP) for Southampton, as Colonel of the North Regiment. On 15 December the North Regiment was ordered to be embodied for duty, and it assembled at Winchester on 25 December.

After briefly serving at Winchester, the regiment marched in three 'divisions' to Bristol in late February 1760 to take charge of French prisoners-of-war. By now the Duke of Bolton had taken personal command of the North Regiment as well as the South Regiment (the Secretary of State for War regarded them as two battalions of a single regiment). In May 1760 the North Regiment moved to Bideford in Devon, from where it escorted prisoners-of-war back to Hilsea Barracks in Portsmouth, Hampshire, in August. In November four companies left Hilsea and went into winter quarters round Newbury, Berkshire, where they were required to provide escorts for prisoners-of-war being sent to Winchester. The other four companies spent the winter in Gosport before marching to rejoin at Newbury in March 1761. From April the regiment was moved around in small detachments between Andover, Stockbridge and Whitchurch in north Hampshire (in June two companies billeted in Stockbridge were temporarily moved out to accommodate the crowds for a horse racing meeting), and Gosport, Winchester and Romsey further south. In late July it moved to Reading, Berkshire, but again was displaced for a race meeting. Finally, in October the regiment went back to Winchester to take over guarding the French prisoners-of-war.

By 1762 the militiamen enlisted in 1759 were approaching the end of their three-year service, and the regiments returned to their home areas for balloting and recruitment. Most of the North Hants went from Winchester to Basingstoke, leaving 130 men who were sent to assist the detachments of the South Hants guarding prisoners-of-war in the Portsmouth area while their own regiment was recruiting at Southampton. The North Hants spent the autumn in the northern part of the county. However, by the end of 1762 a peace treaty was being negotiated (Col Hans Stanley, who resigned from the regiment in December 1761, had been one of the negotiators) and orders were issued on 20 December to disembody both Hampshire regiments. The North Hants were paid off at Winchester on 24 December. The regiment appears to have been mustered for annual training thereafter, with new clothing issued every three years.

=== American War of Independence ===
The militia was called out during the American War of Independence when the country was threatened with invasion by the Americans' allies, France and Spain. The North Hampshire regiment, with eight companies totalling 547 all ranks, was embodied in March 1778 under the command of the Lord-Lieutenant, James Brydges, 3rd Duke of Chandos. On 6 June the regiment was ordered from Winchester to Southampton to cross to the Isle of Wight, where five companies were quartered in Newport (displacing the independent company of Isle of Wight Militia, which went to Ryde and Brading) and Carisbrooke), two at Cowes and one at Yarmouth and Newtown. Parliament permitted the addition of one company raised by voluntary enlistment to supplement the balloted men in each regiment; the North Hampshires did so at the end of July, and organised it as a Light Company. In May 1779 the regiment was relieved on the Isle of Wight by the South Hampshires and embarked for Lymington, where it quartered six companies, sending the other three to Christchurch, later adding quarters at Ringwood and Fordingbridge. On 5 June the regiment began a march via Exeter to Plymouth, where it went into barracks. By September it was camped on Maker Heights overlooking Plymouth. On 19 November it began a march to Bideford for winter quarters, where it was joined by the newly balloted men from Winchester.

In April 1780 the North Hampshires marched to Salisbury, now under the command of Col Hans Sloane, MP for Southampton, and they were then distributed to billets across North Hampshire. On 27 May the regiment was summoned to London to assist in suppressing the Gordon Riots. It marched through the west and south suburbs to Greenwich and then joined the South Hampshires and three other militia regiments in a camp in Hyde Park. They remained there until the disorders were suppressed, and then marched on 9 August to camp on Blackheath with three other militia regiments. The camp broke up on 16 October when the North Hampshires went to winter quarters in Reading with a detachment at Henley-on-Thames. On 7 March 1781 it moved to Portsmouth, picking up that year's new recruits and balloted men as it marched through Hampshire. It then crossed to the Isle of Wight where it was engaged in anti-smuggling patrols. It remained on the island (seven companies at Newport and two at Cowes) for the remainder of the war. By March 1783 a peace treaty was being negotiated and the militia was stood down. The North Hampshires crossed to Lymington and then marched into Winchester to be disembodied on 15 March.

From 1784 to 1792 the militia were assembled for their 28 days' annual peacetime training, but to save money only two-thirds of the men were actually mustered each year.

=== French Revolutionary War ===
The Militia had already been called out before Revolutionary France declared war on Britain on 1 February 1793. On 8 December 1792 Harry Powlett, 6th Duke of Bolton, as Lord-Lieutenant of Hampshire, received orders to embody those men of the North Hampshires who had undergone training earlier in the year, and the regiment assembled at Winchester on 19 December; it numbered 282 effective men, needing 222 to complete. Recruiting parties were sent out across North Hampshire during the early months of 1793.

The French Revolutionary Wars saw a new phase for the English militia: they were embodied for a whole generation, and became regiments of full-time professional soldiers (though restricted to service in the British Isles), which the regular army increasingly saw as a prime source of recruits. They served in coast defences, manned garrisons, guarded prisoners-of-war, and carried out internal security duties, while their traditional local defence duties were taken over by the Volunteers and mounted Yeomanry.

The North Hants' first station was to be Chatham, Kent, and it began its march there under Col Sloane on 13 February. It was joined by the new recruits in June. During the previous war it had become customary to gather the militia into large encampments for summer training alongside regular troops. At the end of June 1793 the North Hants, with 11 other militia regiments, five cavalry regiments and attached artillery, formed a camp at Broadwater Common, near Tunbridge Wells on the Kent–Sussex border. The division then moved about 6–8 August to a camp at Ashdown Forest before marching to the Brighton area. After two weeks' training there, the whole division returned to Broadwater for the rest of the summer. In September the North Hants were back at Brighton, from where they were sent on 1 November to Portsmouth to cross to the Isle of Wight for the winter. In May 1794 the regiment re-crossed to Portsmouth and marched to spend a second summer at Brighton Camp, before returning to winter quarters on the Isle of Wight once more. The North Hants spent part of the summer of 1795 in Sussex, visiting Brighton again before moving into Blatchington Barracks. It went to Porchester Barracks later in the summer and remained there until May 1796 when it moved to Plymouth Dock Barracks.

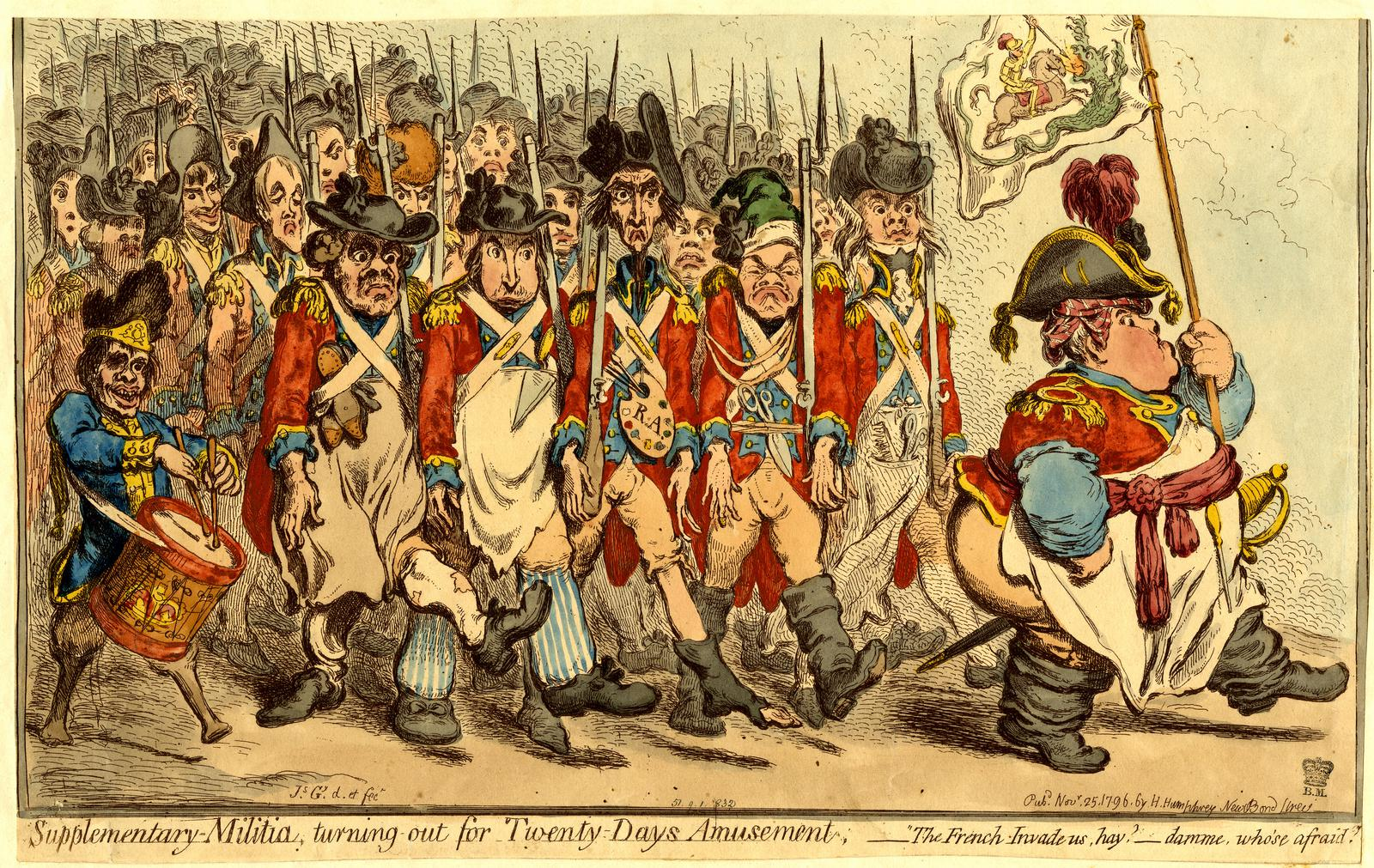
Supplementary-Militia, turning-out for Twenty Days Amusement: 1796 caricature by James Gillray.

In order to have as many men as possible under arms for home defence to release regulars for overseas service, the Government created the Supplementary Militia in 1796, a compulsory levy of men to be trained in their spare time, and to be incorporated into the Regular Militia in emergency. Hampshire's additional quota was fixed at 1049 men. The county lieutenancies were required to carry out 20 days' initial training as soon as possible, and the North Hants sent parties from Plymouth to train the North Hampshire supplementary men in batches.

In March 1797 the regiment moved to Weymouth, Dorset, and Poole Barracks, then to Gosport at the end of May. It remained there until January 1798, when a detachment was sent to Andover. The Supplementary Militia were called out in 1798 to augment the Regular Militia regiments, two drafts of over 200 joining the North Hants at Andover in February and May, bringing the regiment up to a new establishment of 47 sergeants, 45 corporals, 20 drummers and 960 privates, including an extra company; some additional officers were commissioned. The regiment was then concentrated at Gosport before crossing to the Isle of Wight on 19–20 May. It was distributed in outposts across the island.

The Irish Rebellion broke out in 1798, and a number of militia regiments, including the North Hampshire, volunteered to serve there. Legislation was rapidly passed to permit this. Colonel Sloane and the regiment boarded the troopships Alkamar and Pallas in Cowes Road on 9 September and sailed out into Spithead. However, due to contrary winds and gales they were still there on 10 October, by which time the rebellion had been quelled. The regiment finally disembarked at Lymington, where it went into winter quarters.

On 3 May 1799 the regiment was ordered to cross once more to the Isle of Wight. The threat of invasion seemed to have receded and the Supplementary Militia was stood down in July. The surplus men were encouraged to volunteer for the Regular Army: 220 men from the North Hants did so, mainly into the 4th 5th and 9th Regiments of Foot. In October Captain Stephen Terry persuaded the entire Grenadier Company to transfer to the 62nd Foot, in which he was given a commission. The establishment of the embodied North Hampshire regiment was reduced to just 374 other ranks (ORs) in six companies.

Colonel Sloane retired in early 1800 and Lieutenant-Colonel George Jervoise was promoted to succeed him on 17 March 1800. In April 1800 the regiment moved back to the mainland and was sent to Honiton, Axminster and Kilmington in East Devon, before moving to Bideford and Barnstaple in the north of the county. It then went to Plymouth, where it was used to escort prisoners-of-war to Exeter. In February 1801 the regiment was joined at Plymouth by a draft of newly balloted men. It continued to provide prisoner escorts across the West Country, the regiment concentrating at Berry Head Barracks in June. In September it was brought up to strength by re-embodying those supplementaries stood down in 1799 who had not joined the Regulars. In October and November the regiment marched by way of Taunton and Warminster to Winchester Barracks. In January 1802 the regiment went to Portsmouth, but the Treaty of Amiens was signed in March, ending the war, and the North Hants marched back to Winchester, where they were disembodied on 26 April.

=== Napoleonic Wars ===
The Peace of Amiens was short-lived and the North Hampshire Militia were re-embodied on 29 November 1802, initially with an establishment of 462 ORs, increased in March 1803 to 637 in six companies with the addition of the supplementaries. It was stationed at Blatchington Barracks. Britain declared war on France once more on 18 May 1803. Soon afterwards the regiment moved to Lewes Barracks, where it remained until March 1804. During the summer it moved around Sussex between Lewes, Hailsham and Steyning Barracks, or camps at Brighton and Eastbourne. Fram January to June 1805 the regiment was at Shoreham Barracks and at Worthing, and sent 100 volunteers to the regulars (mostly to the 82nd Foot). On 4 July the regiment was ordered to Portsmouth Barracks, and during the summer of 1805, when Napoleon was massing his 'Army of England' at Boulogne for a projected invasion, the regiment, with 514 men in 8 companies under Lt-Col Bromley Frith, formed part of the Portsmouth Garrison under Maj-Gen John Hope.

The North Hampshire Militia remained at Portsmouth until 15 August 1806. By then the men had been getting into trouble in the town and a number were in the guardroom awaiting court-martial. Lieutenant-Col Frith successfully begged that the regiment could be allowed to exchange with the West Essex Militia at Gosport Barracks. By now volunteering for the regulars had so reduced the Hampshire militia (particularly the South regiment) that the Lord Lieutenant, Lord Bolton, proposed to combine them into a single regiment, but nothing came of this. In September 1807 the North Hants were marched from Gosport to Ilminster and Ilchester in Somerset, and then on to Plymouth where they were quartered for the winter. From May 1808 until June 1809 it was at Pendennis Castle, and then spent the summer at Exeter. In the winter of 1809–10 it was quartered at barracks in south Devon, at Ottery, Berry Head, and finally at Kingsbridge before being ordered on 21 June to Bristol. It stayed there until August 1811. Colonel Jervoise resigned in July 1811 and was replaced by George, 3rd Lord Rodney.

=== Ireland and Scotland ===
In the summer of 1811 the government invited English militia regiments to volunteer for two years' service in Ireland. The North Hampshires did so, and on 31 August the regiment sailed from Lamplighter's Hall in Bristol and landed at Dublin under the command of Col Lord Rodney with a strength of 14 officers, 28 sergeants, 21 corporals, 2 drummers and 370 privates in six companies, accompanied by 3 officers' servants, 61 women and 37 children. A 25-man detachment under a sergeant remained in England attached to the Battalion of Militia Detachments at Sheerness. The regiment marched from Dublin to Strabane, where it was stationed for its whole period of service in Ireland, with outlying detachments posted to other towns and villages during the summer of 1812. With Lord Rodney attending Parliament, the regiment was commanded by Lt-Col John Oglander. In April 1813 it marched to Armagh and the following month to Belfast, from where it embarked at Donaghadee on 10 May for Scotland. It arrived at Portpatrick on 25 May and marched to Haddington, where it was quartered in the barracks while the recruiting party from Andover and detachment from Sheerness marched north to join.

The regiment left Haddington on 15 November and marched in two 'divisions' into England to Carlisle, where it was ordered to continue to Derby, and from there ordered to Portsmouth. It arrived on 29–30 December and was quartered in Hilsea Barracks, then at Portsea Barracks and finally at Fort Cumberland. Napoleon abdicated in April 1814, and the militia began to be disembodied. The North Hampshires marched to Winchester on 28 June and were paid off on 18 July. The men were allowed to keep their newly issued uniforms and a storehouse was built for the arms and accoutrements.

However, Napoleon returned from exile in 1815, initiating the Hundred Days campaign. The North Hampshire Militia was re-embodied on 24 June (just after the decisive Battle of Waterloo was fought) and remained quartered at Winchester until 1 February 1816, when it was disembodied again.

=== Long peace ===
After Waterloo there was another long peace. Thereafter the militia were only assembled four times for training, and not again after 1831. Although officers continued to be commissioned into the militia, the permanent staffs of sergeants and drummers (who were occasionally used to maintain public order) were progressively reduced.

Colonel Lord Rodney resigned in 1841 and was replaced by the Earl of Wiltshire, a former Lt-Col of the 17th Lancers and soon to be 14th Marquess of Winchester. This appointment disgusted Lt-Col Peter Hawker, a Peninsular War veteran who had effectively run the regiment since 1821 and expected the promotion.

== 1852 reforms ==
The Militia of the United Kingdom was revived by the Militia Act 1852, enacted during a renewed period of international tension. As before, units were raised and administered on a county basis, and filled by voluntary enlistment (although conscription by means of the Militia Ballot might be used if the counties failed to meet their quotas). Training was for 56 days on enlistment, then for 21–28 days per year, during which the men received full army pay. Under the Act, Militia units could be embodied by Royal Proclamation for full-time home defence service in three circumstances:

1. 'Whenever a state of war exists between Her Majesty and any foreign power'.
2. 'In all cases of invasion or upon imminent danger thereof'.
3. 'In all cases of rebellion or insurrection'.

At the time the North Hampshire Militia had 17 officers listed, few of whom intended to serve again, and a permanent staff of the adjutant and one sergeant. However, recruitment began on 24 September 1852 and by 23 November the full quota of 500 volunteers for six companies had been raised. A sergeant-major and six sergeants came from the Regulars and the 48th Foot stationed at Winchester Barracks helped with training when the revived regiment assembled there for 21 days on 1 February 1853. The South Hampshire Militia was also revived at the same time, but in 1853 it was decided to convert the bulk of it into the Hampshire Militia Artillery. On 27 December 1853 the remainder of the South Hampshires were merged into the North Hampshires, which henceforth became simply the Hampshire Militia. The amalgamated infantry regiment of eight companies was commanded by the Marquess of Winchester, with Frederick Clinton, formerly a captain in the Grenadier Guards, as his lieutenant-colonel. The regiment built a new store in Winchester in 1854.

=== Crimean War and after ===
The amalgamated regiment carried out its first annual training from 4 April to 1 May 1854. However, the declaration of the Crimean War led to the militia being called out for home defence. The warrant ordering the Hampshire Militia to be embodied and increased to 10 companies was issued on 29 May 1854, though its assembly was delayed until 1 August when sufficient accommodation was available. The men gathered at Haslar Barracks, Gosport, on 1 August and drill began immediately. During the summer five companies were quartered at Haslar and five at nearby Fort Monckton, and then on 19 September they were concentrated at Anglesea Barracks, Portsmouth.

In November 1854 the men were invited to volunteer for the Regular Army, which became a regular feature for the militia for the rest of its existence; by the end of the year 2 officers and 159 ORs had transferred. Due to an error in the drafting of the 1852 Act the government was forced to release many of the militiamen in March 1855 and attempt to re-engage them: the result was that by early April the Hampshires had dwindled to 170 privates. The regiment went by rail to Winchester, and in May a further 1 officer and 77 ORs volunteered for regiments of the line. Despite continued recruiting, the regiment only had 207 ORs in November and was reduced from 10 to four companies. A further 71 men volunteered for the line in January 1856. The regiment returned to Fort Monckton in January 1856, but the war was ended by the Treaty of Paris signed on 30 March. The Royal Warrant to disembody the militia was issued on 29 May and on 3 June the Hampshire Militia marched to Winchester, where the men were paid off on 5 June.

From September 1858 the regiment did its 21 or 28 days' training each year at Winchester, usually at a season when farm labourers (who made up the bulk of the ORs) could be spared from their work. The Indian Mutiny led to a surge in recruiting for the regiment, and although it was not among the regiments embodied to relieve regular troops for overseas service, it did produce a large number of volunteers for the regulars each year. Training was carried out with either six or eight companies, depending on the availability of officers. The Militia Reserve introduced in 1867 consisted of present and former militiamen who undertook to serve overseas in case of war.

As an experiment in May 1867 the annual training was held at Aldershot in conjunction with the regular division stationed there. The Hampshire Militia was brigaded with the Royal Berkshire, the Oxfordshire and the 1st and 2nd Royal Surrey. The camp ended with a divisional field day and was considered a success, being repeated in subsequent years. The Hampshires attended in 1868 and again in 1873, when the camp ended with a divisional field day.

== Cardwell and Childers Reforms ==
Under the 'Localisation of the Forces' scheme introduced by the Cardwell Reforms of 1872, militia regiments were brigaded with their local regular and Volunteer battalions. Sub-District No 40 (County of Hampshire). It comprised:

- 37th (North Hampshire) Regiment of Foot
- 67th (South Hampshire) Regiment of Foot
- Hampshire Militia at Winchester
- 2nd Hampshire Militia – to be formed
- 1st Administrative Battalion, Hampshire Rifle Volunteer Corps at Winchester
- 2nd Administrative Battalion, Hampshire Rifle Volunteer Corps at Portsmouth
- 4th Administrative Battalion, Hampshire Rifle Volunteer Corps at Southampton
- 1st Administrative Battalion, Isle of Wight Rifle Volunteer Corps at Newport
- No 40 Brigade Depot at Fort Elson, Gosport, pending a move to a permanent depot at Lower Barracks, Winchester

The plan had been for each pair of linked regular regiments to have two militia battalions associated with them, and the intention was to raise a second battalion for the Hampshire Militia, but this was never done.

Militia battalions now had a large cadre of permanent staff (about 30) and a number of the officers were former Regulars. Around a third of the recruits and many young officers went on to join the Regular Army. In 1873 the Hampshire Militia's Regular adjutant, Capt James Nicol, obtained leave to join Sir Garnet Wolseley's Ashanti Expedition. As one of the 'Wolseley Ring' of special service officers he served with a native levy and was killed leading a charge at Boborasi on 29 January 1874. The Militia Reserve were called out in 1878 during the international crisis caused by the Russo-Turkish War, when over 200 Hants Militia reservists responded and were attached to the 37th Foot.

Following the Cardwell Reforms a mobilisation scheme began to appear in the Army List from December 1875. This assigned places in an order of battle to Militia units serving Regular units in an 'Active Army' and a 'Garrison Army'. The Hampshire Militia's assigned war station was with the Garrison Army in the Portsmouth defences.

=== 3rd (Hampshire Militia) Battalion, Hampshire Regiment ===
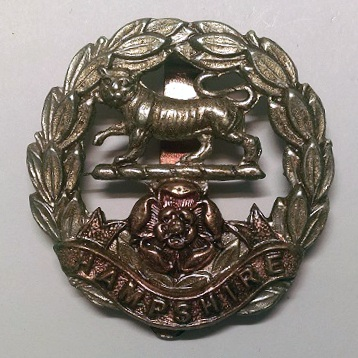
Cap badge of the Hampshire Regiment.

The Childers Reforms of 1881 completed the Cardwell process by converting the linked Regular regiments into county regiments and incorporating the militia battalions into them. The 37th and 67th Foot formed the Hampshire Regiment on 1 July 1881 with the following organisation:

- 1st and 2nd Battalions, Hampshire Regiment
- 3rd (Hampshire Militia) Battalion, Hampshire Regiment
- 1st–5th Volunteer Battalions, Hampshire Regiment

The 3rd Battalion continued to carry out its annual training each year.

With the bulk of the Regular Army serving in South Africa during the Second Boer War, the Militia were called out for home defence. The 3rd Battalion was embodied from January to December 1900.

== Special Reserve ==
After the Boer War, the future of the militia was called into question. There were moves to reform the Auxiliary Forces (Militia, Yeomanry and Volunteers) to take their place in the six Army Corps proposed by the Secretary of State for War, St John Brodrick. However, little of Brodrick's scheme was carried out. Under the more sweeping Haldane Reforms of 1908, the Militia was replaced by the Special Reserve (SR), a semi-professional force whose role was to provide reinforcement drafts for regular units serving overseas in wartime, rather like the earlier Militia Reserve. The battalion became the 3rd (Reserve) Battalion, Hampshire Regiment, on 21 June 1908.

=== World War I ===
Just before the outbreak of World War I 3rd (R) Bn had carried out its annual training at Christchurch, where it had camped on the estate of Lord Malmesbury, a former captain in the battalion. Since most of that year's intake of 200 recruits had chosen to transfer to the Regular Army, it was well under its establishment strength when war was declared on 4 August 1914. The battalion was embodied at Winchester and completed its mobilisation on 7 August. Next day, when it went to its war station at Albany Barracks at Parkhurst, Isle of Wight, it included nearly 500 Army Reservists who had reported to the depot but who were not yet required by the 1st Bn as it prepared to join the British Expeditionary Force (BEF) in France. The 1st Bn also transferred to 3rd (R) Bn its soldiers who were unfit or too young to serve overseas. With Army Reservists, Special Reservists and new recruits, the battalion reached 2000 strong by mid-September, and was ordered to spin off 13th (Service) Bn (see below). Later wounded men of the regiment joined 3rd (R) Bn after their convalescence, to be prepared for drafting. In January 1915 3rd (R) Bn moved to Gosport, with Battalion Headquarters (HQ) at Fort Gomer and detachments guarding Forts Gilkicker and Monckton, Southampton Docks, a seaplane depot at Calshot Castle, and a wireless station and torpedo test facility at Horsea Island. The battalion spent the rest of the war as part of the Portsmouth Garrison, carrying out its dual roles of coast defence and training reinforcement drafts for the battalions serving overseas. Not only was the 1st Bn heavily engaged on the Western Front, but when the 2nd Bn returned from India 3rd (R) Bn provided drafts to bring it up to strength before it proceeded to Gallipoli, and then to replace the heavy casualties that the 2nd and 10th (Service) Bns suffered in that campaign. By the end of 1915 3rd (R) Bn had sent 124 officers and 5247 ORs overseas, and still had almost 3000 men on parade.

Under WO Instruction 106 of 10 November 1915 the battalion was ordered to send a draft of 109 men to the new Machine Gun Training Centre at Grantham where they were to form the basis of a brigade machine-gun company of the new Machine Gun Corps. In addition, 10 men at a time were to undergo training at Grantham as battalion machine gunners. The order stated that 'Great care should be taken in the selection of men for training as machine gunners as only well educated and intelligent men are suitable for this work'.

When the Armistice with Germany came into force the 3rd (R) Bn was still stationed at Gosport. During the war it had sent 500 officers and 22,000 ORs overseas as reinforcements. In February 1919 it moved to Catterick Camp where it was disembodied on 3 July 1919 and its remaining personnel reformed the 1st Bn.

=== 13th (Reserve) Battalion ===
After Lord Kitchener issued his call for volunteers in August 1914, the battalions of the 1st, 2nd and 3rd New Armies ('K1', 'K2' and 'K3' of 'Kitchener's Army') were quickly formed at the regimental depots, which struggled to cope with the influx of volunteers. The SR battalions also swelled with new recruits and were soon well above their establishment strength. On 8 October 1914 each SR battalion was ordered to use the surplus to form a service battalion of the 4th New Army ('K4'). Accordingly, the 3rd (Reserve) Bn at Parkhurst used 640 surplus men to form the 13th (Service) Bn, Hampshire Regiment. It became part of 96th Brigade in 32nd Division. In April 1915 the WO decided to convert the K4 battalions into 2nd Reserve units, providing drafts for the K1–K3 battalions in the same way that the SR was doing for the Regular battalions. 96th Brigade became 8th Reserve Brigade and the Hampshire battalion became 13th (Reserve) Battalion, at Wareham, Dorset, where it trained drafts for the 10th, 11th and 12th (Service) Bns of the regiment. By September it was stationed at Bovington Camp. On 1 September 1916 the 2nd Reserve battalions were transferred to the Training Reserve and the battalion was redesignated 34th Training Reserve Bn, still in 8th Reserve Bde at Wool, Dorset. The training staff retained their Hampshire badges. It was disbanded on 21 January 1918 at Larkhill Camp.

=== Postwar ===
The SR resumed its old title of Militia in 1921 but like most militia units the 3rd Hampshire remained in abeyance after World War I. By the outbreak of World War II in 1939, the only officer still listed for the battalion was the Hon Colonel, the Earl of Selborne. The Militia was formally disbanded in April 1953.

== Commanders ==
=== Colonels ===
The following served as Colonel of the Regiment:

- Lt-Gen Charles Powlett, 5th Duke of Bolton, from formation; died 1765
- Hans Stanley, MP, commissioned 4 August 1759, resigned 11 December 1761
- Sir John Mordaunt Cope, 8th Baronet, promoted 12 December 1761, died 1779
- Hans Sloane, MP, promoted 2 February 1780, brevet colonel in the army 14 March 1794, resigned 4 January 1800
- George Purefoy-Jervoise, promoted 17 March 1800, resigned 12 July 1811
- George Rodney, 3rd Baron Rodney, commissioned 12 July 1811, resigned 1841, died 21 June 1842
- John Paulet, 14th Marquess of Winchester, former Lt-Col 8th Hussars, appointed 22 June 1842; continued as colonel of the amalgamated regiment until 1870

Following the 1852 Militia Act the rank of colonel was abolished in the militia and in future the lieutenant-colonel would become the commanding officer (CO); at the same time, the position of Honorary Colonel was introduced.

=== Lieutenant-Colonels ===
Lieutenant-Colonels of the regiment (COs after 1870):

- Sir Richard Mill, 6th Baronet, MP for Hampshire, resigned 30 April 1761
- Barnard Brocas, captain 1760, major 30 April 1761, promoted 12 August 1761
- William Hammond, lieutenant 4 August 1759, captain-lieutenant 4 October 1760, captain 30 April 1761, major in 1778, promoted 28 February 1780, resigned 24 May 1793
- Humphrey Minchin, captain 24 April 1779, major 14 April 1788, promoted 24 May 1793, died 26 March 1796
- Charles Ingoldsby Paulet, MP, ensign 4 May 1781, lieutenant 25 December 1781, captain 6 May 1788, major 25 May 1793, became courtesy Earl of Wiltshire 1794, promoted 27 March 1796, resigned 14 March 1798, later 13th Marquess of Winchester
- George Purefoy-Jervoise, captain 21 January 1794, major 29 May 1794, promoted to Lt-Col 7 March 1796, promoted to colonel 17 March 1800
- Bedingfield Bromley Frith, lieutenant 25 May 1779, captain 1 May 1788, major 27 March 1796, promoted to Lt-Col 25 March 1800, died February 1811
- Charles Barton, quartermaster 3 July 1786, captain-lieutenant 25 March 1800, captain 19 February 1803, major August 1806, promoted to Lt-Col 3 November 1810, resigned 22 November 1811
- Sir Leonard Worsley-Holmes, 9th Baronet, appointed 7 February 1811, resigned 4 August 1812
- John Oglander, captain 25 May 1806, major 22 November 1812, promoted to Lt-Col 5 August 1812, resigned 6 October 1821
- Peter Hawker, served with the 14th Light Dragoons in the Peninsular War, appointed major 28 October 1815, promoted to Lt-Col 23 November 1821, died 7 August 1853
- Brevet-Colonel Frederick Clinton, formerly Grenadier Guards, appointed 21 July 1854
- Severus William Lynam Stretton, former Lt-Col 40th Foot, served in the Peninsular War, appointed 9 March 1855, retired 14 March 1868
- George Briggs, former major, 1st Dragoon Guards, served in Crimean War, later Lt-Col commanding 1st Administrative Battalion, West Yorkshire Rifle Volunteers 1860–62; appointed 17 February 1870, resigned 20 June 1885
- Sir Nelson Rycrot, 4th Baronet, former Lt, 85th Foot, originally appointed as Capt 16 October 1868, major 20 June 1883, promoted to Lt-Col 20 June 1885, retired 25 July 1891; became Hon Col of the regiment
- George Hope Lloyd-Verney, former lieutenant 74th Foot, Brigade major of Queensland Auxiliary Forces; appointed captain 4 May 1874, major 29 January 1887, promoted to Lt-Col 15 August 1891
- William Palmer, 2nd Earl of Selborne, originally commissioned as 2nd Lt 21 May 1879, lieutenant 23 March 1881, captain 29 July 1885, promoted to Lt-Col 22 April 1899
- William Graham Nicholson, promoted to Lt-Col 22 April 1904
- William Barrow Simmonds, promoted to Lt-Col 25 July 1910
- Cecil de Pre Penton Powney, originally commissioned as 2nd Lt 3 November 1880, later Lt, Grenadier Guards; returned to 3rd Bn Hampshire Regiment, promoted to Lt-Col 27 September 1913, retired 4 January 1916
- Roger Daniell, promoted to Lt-Col 4 January 1916, Brevet Colonel 1 January 1919

=== Honorary Colonels ===
The following served as Honorary Colonel of the regiment:

- John Paulet, 14th Marquess of Winchester, former Colonel, appointed 15 March 1872, died 6 July 1887
- Sir Nelson Rycroft, 4th Baronet, former CO, appointed 25 July 1891, died 30 March 1894
- Gen Sir John Davis, retired General Officer Commanding Southern District at Portsmouth, appointed 26 February 1896
- Earl of Selborne, former CO, appointed 23 July 1904, died 26 February 1942

=== Other notable officers ===
Other notable officers included:

- Sir Thomas Hesketh, 1st Baronet, commissioned as captain 4 August 1759
- Thomas Woods Knollys, titular Earl of Banbury, captain in 1771
- Francis Thornhill Baring, commissioned as captain 29 September 1818, resigned 1821, later created Lord Northbrook.
- Sir James Whalley-Smythe-Gardiner, 3rd Baronet, commissioned as major 23 November 1821, resigned 14 June 1847
- Sir Henry Charles Paulet, 1st Baronet, commissioned as major 14 July 1847
- Hon Richard Fitzroy Somerset, commissioned as lieutenant 31 October 1849, retired 5 April 1856, later 2nd Lord Raglan
- Capt Sir John Lees, 3rd Baronet, commissioned on 12 October 1861, also raised and commanded the 1st (Ryde) Isle of Wight Rifle Volunteer Corps in 1860
- James Theobald, explorer and later MP, lieutenant 4 May 1861, captain 19 May 1864, retired 1869
- Sir George Innes, 8th Baronet, former lieutenant 22nd Bengal Native Infantry, later captain 5th Lanark Rifle Volunteers; appointed captain 15 July 1870, resigned 15 May 1875
- Sub-Lieutenant Augustus Paulet, Earl of Wiltshire, commissioned 31 July 1873, transferred to Coldstream Guards 27 September 1879, later 15th Marquess of Winchester; killed at the Battle of Magersfontein, 1899
- Lieutenant Lord Henry Paulet, commissioned 2nd Lt 26 November 1879, lieutenant 23 March 1881, resigned May 1883, later 16th Marquess of Winchester and major 13th (Service) Battalion, Rifle Brigade, during World War I
- James Harris, 5th Earl of Malmesbury, appointed lieutenant 18 December 1895, captain 3 May 1899, resigned 24 December 1902; rejoined 5 September 1914, seconded to General Staff 1916 and later promoted to major

== Heritage & Ceremonial ==
=== Uniforms & Insignia ===
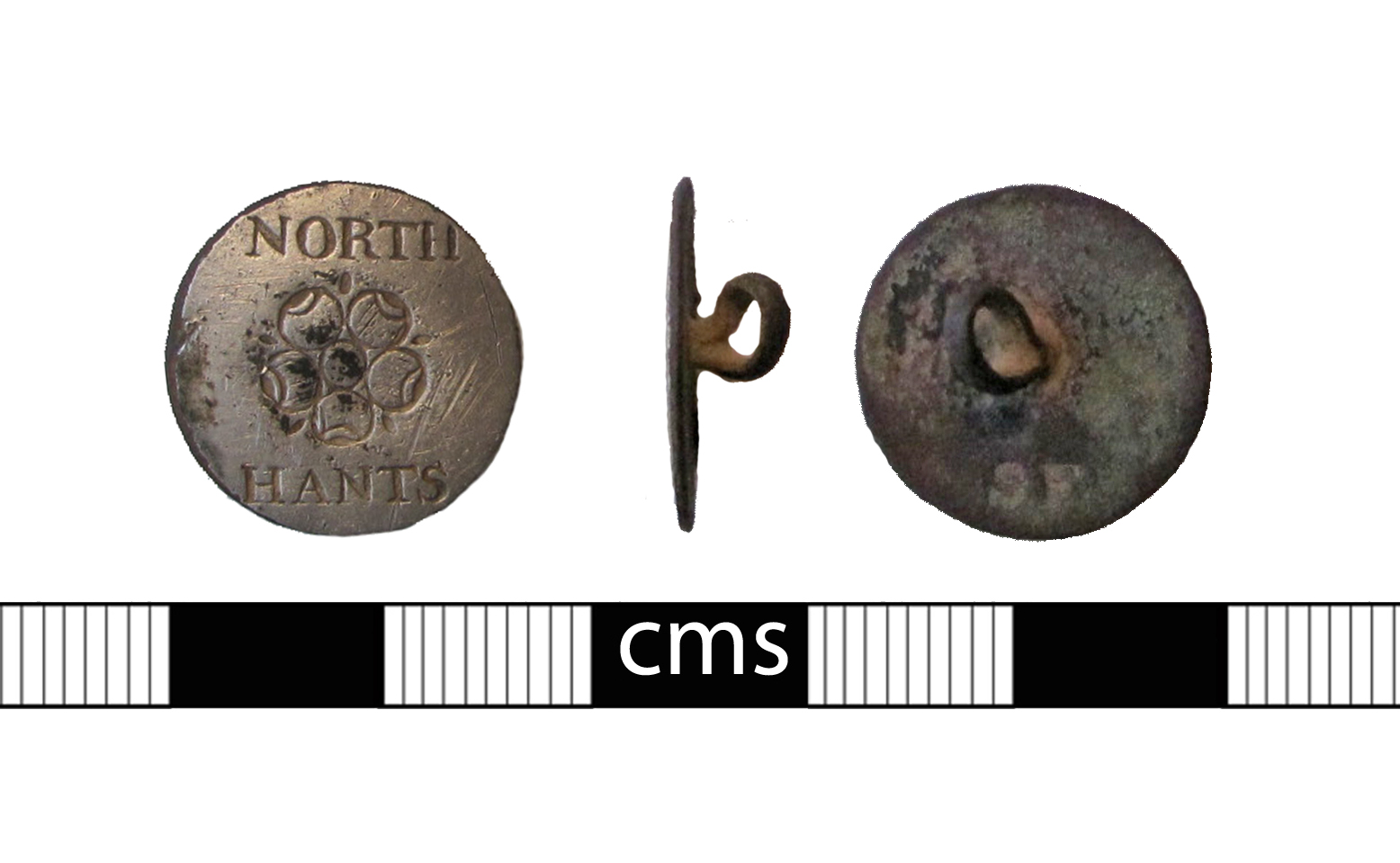
An early copper alloy button of the North Hampshire Militia.

When the North Hampshire Militia was formed, the facings on its red coats were black. The Supplementary Militia attached to the regiment also wore black facings. In 1813 the band of the North Hampshires wore a black-tipped white feather in their caps. At some point between 1778 and 1800 the South Hampshire Militia changed to yellow facings, but the amalgamated regiment in 1853 adopted black. When the regiment became 3rd Bn Hampshire Regiment in 1881 its facings changed from black to the white assigned to English county regiments. In 1904 the Hampshire Regiment regained the yellow facings worn by both the 37th and 67th Foot before 1881.

The traditional badge of Hampshire is a rose, granted according to legend by King Henry V before he departed on the Agincourt campaign. The North Hampshire Militia adopted the red rose, which was displayed on the regiment's early buttons, with 'NORTH' above and 'HANTS' below. The officers' gilt buttons ca 1800 carried the rose within a crowned garter inscribed 'NORTH HANTS'. Officers' shoulder-belt plates about 1840 bore the same design with a spray of oak leaves underneath. The rose was confirmed as the badge of the amalgamated militia regiment in 1860. In 1855 the North Hampshire ORs' waistbelt plate bore the regimental number '13', but this had to be changed to '122' after amalgamation with the South Hampshires. In 1858 the permanent staff took the hated '122' off the scroll (on their helmet plates) and replaced it with 'THE HAMPSHIRE MILITIA'. The button worn by the regiment 1855–81 bore the Hampshire rose within a crowned garter (carrying the Garter motto 'HONI SOIT QUI MAL Y PENSE') on an eight-pointed cut star; the officers' shako plate about 1869 bore the same design. The ORs' forage cap badge 1874–81 had the rose with a crown above and a scroll marked 'HAMPSHIRE' below. The badge of the combined Hampshire Regiment from 1881 incorporated a rose (representing both the Hampshire rose worn by the Hampshire Militia and the rose worn by the 37th Foot on Minden Day) and the Royal Tiger awarded to the 67th Foot for service in India.

The original Regimental colour of the North Hampshire Militia was black, with the 'old' badge (presumably the Hampshire rose) in the upper corner and the coat of arms of the lord lieutenant, the Duke of Bolton, painted in the centre.

=== Precedence ===
In the Seven Years' War militia regiments camped together took precedence according to the order in which they had arrived. During the War of American Independence the counties were given an order of precedence determined by ballot each year. For Hampshire the positions were:

- 1st on 1 June 1778
- 42nd on12 May 1779
- 3rd on 6 May 1780
- 10th on 28 April 1781
- 15th on 7 May 1782

The militia order of precedence balloted for in 1793 (Hampshire was 6th) remained in force throughout the French Revolutionary War. Another ballot for precedence took place at the start of the Napoleonic War, when Hampshire was 15th.This order continued until 1833. In that year the King drew the lots for individual regiments and the resulting list remained in force until 1855. The regiments raised before the peace of 1763 took the first 47 places: the North Hampshire was 13th and the South Hampshire was 43rd, although most regiments paid little notice to the number. In 1855, with a number of new units and others converted into artillery, the list was revised: the combined North and South Hampshires was considered a new unit and given the precedence of 122nd, despite the protestations of the regiment.

=== Memorials ===
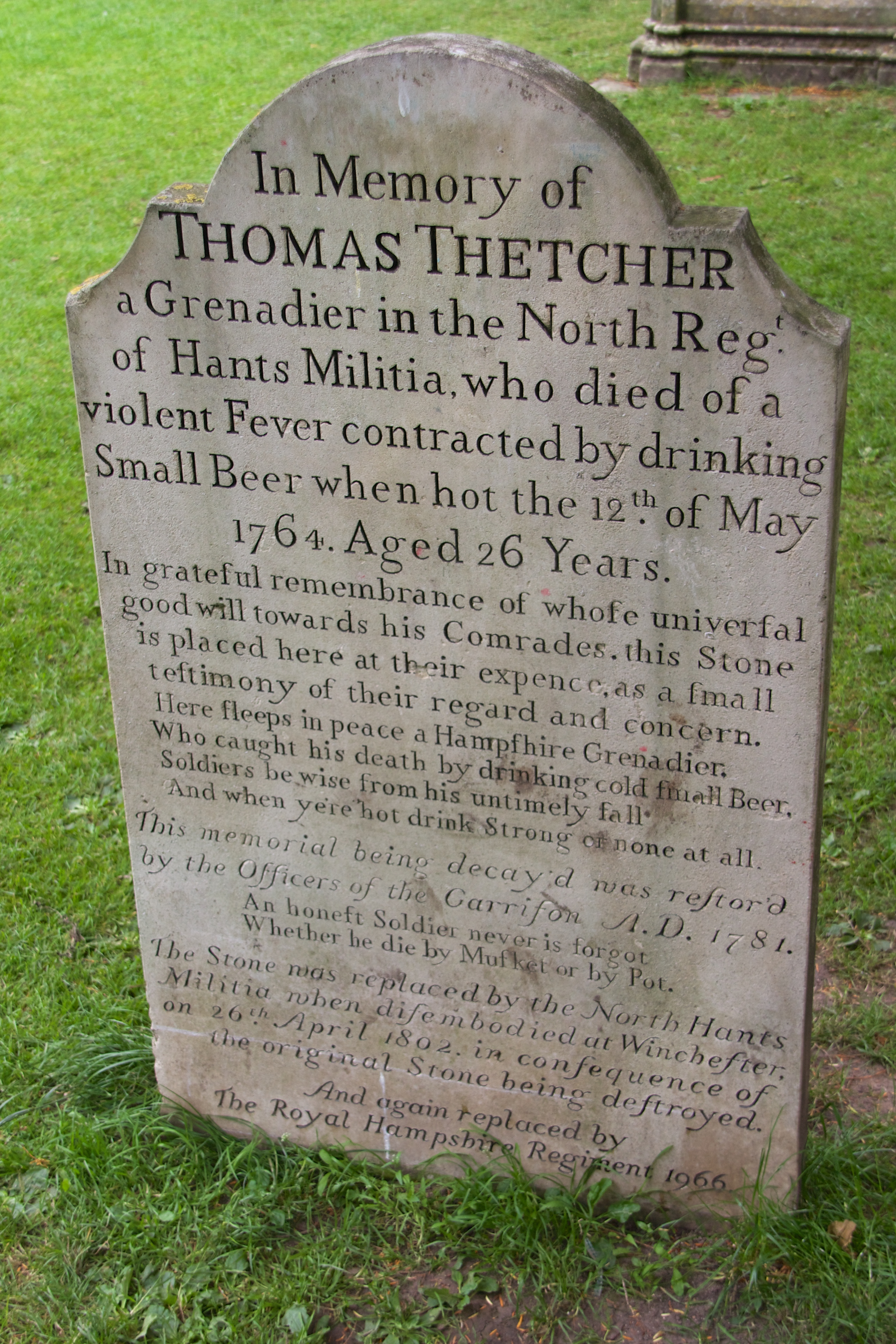
Thomas Thetcher's gravestone

A famous gravestone to Thomas Thetcher, a Grenadier of the regiment, stands in the graveyard of Winchester Cathedral. Thetcher is recorded as having died 'of a violent Fever contracted by drinking Small beer when hot the 12th of May 1764, aged 26 Years'. This would have been during the disembodied regiment's annual training. His memorial inscription includes the quatrain:

Here sleeps in peace a Hampshire Grenadier,
Who caught his death by drinking cold small Beer,
Soldiers be wise from his untimely fall
And when ye're hot drink Strong or none at all.

and:

An Honest Soldier never is forgot
Whether he die by Musket or by Pot.

The stone was restored by officers of the garrison in 1781 and replaced by the North Hampshire Militia when it was disembodied in 1801. The present gravestone is listed as a County Treasure of Hampshire.

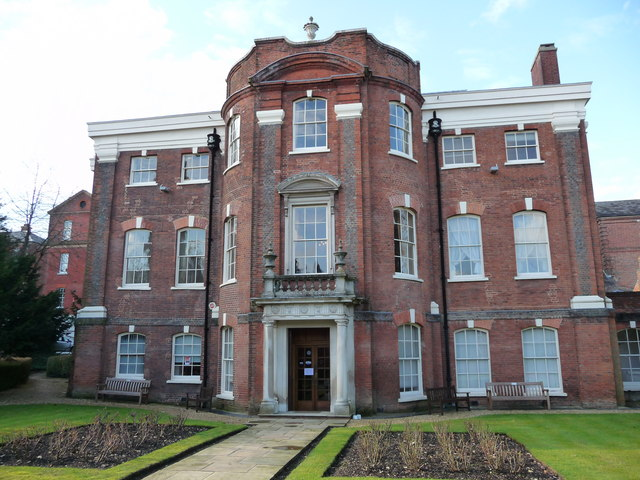
Serle's House

Colonel Peter Serle of the South Hants Militia had sold his house on Southgate Street in Winchester to the government in 1796. Serle's House became the headquarters first of his Eling and Millbrook Volunteers and then of the South Hampshire Militia. During the 19th Century it was used as a judge's lodgings and as the Lower Barracks were developed in that part of the city it served as the barrackmaster's residence, officers' married quarters and the officers' mess. In 1881 it became the HQ of the 3rd (Hampshire Militia) Battalion, Hampshire Regiment, and of the 37th Regimental district, and later the Regimental HQ of the Hampshire Regiment. It is now in use as the Royal Hampshire Regiment Museum and Memorial Garden.

== See also ==
- Militia (Great Britain)
- Militia (United Kingdom)
- Hampshire Militia
- South Hampshire Militia
- Isle of Wight Militia
- Hampshire Militia Artillery
- Royal Hampshire Regiment
- Special Reserve
