= Hampshire Militia Artillery =

Auxiliary unit of the British Army

Hampshire Militia Artillery 2nd Brigade, Southern Division, RA
- Active: 27 December 1853 – 30 September 1891
- Country: United Kingdom
- Branch: Militia
- Role: Coastal artillery
- Part of: Southern Division, Royal Artillery
- Garrison/HQ: Fort Rowner

The Hampshire Militia Artillery was a part-time reserve unit of Britain's Royal Artillery. Formed in 1853 from existing infantry militia units in Hampshire, its wartime role was to man the existing defences and new 'Palmerston Forts' guarding Portsmouth. It later merged with the equivalent unit on the Isle of Wight

== Background ==
The long-standing national Militia of the United Kingdom was revived by the Militia Act 1852 (15 & 16 Vict. c. 50), enacted during a renewed period of international tension. As before, units were raised and administered on a county basis, and filled by voluntary enlistment (although conscription by means of the Militia Ballot might be used if the counties failed to meet their quotas). Training was for 21–28 days per year, during which the men received full army pay. Under the act, Militia units could be embodied by royal proclamation for full-time home defence service in three circumstances:

1. 'Whenever a state of war exists between Her Majesty and any foreign power'.
2. 'In all cases of invasion or upon imminent danger thereof'.
3. 'In all cases of rebellion or insurrection'.

The Militia Act 1852 introduced Artillery Militia units in addition to the traditional infantry regiments. Their wartime role was to man coastal defences and fortifications, relieving the Royal Artillery (RA) for active service.

== Origin ==
The former North and South regiments of Hampshire Militia were amalgamated as a single infantry regiment on 27 December 1853, with 1 officer from the North regiment and 3 officers and 396 other ranks (ORs) transferred from the South Regiment to form the Hampshire Militia Artillery of five companies at Portsmouth. The full establishment of the unit was to be 58 officers and non-commissioned officers and 500 gunners.

The Lieutenant-Colonel Commandant was Richard Beaumont Burnaby, a retired Lt-Col in the Royal Artillery and a veteran of the Battle of Waterloo. (Note: Having retired on full pay, he continued to receive promotion in the army: colonel 28 November 1854, major-general 21 July 1864, lieutenant-general 10 November 1868, all while carrying out the duties of a militia Lt-Col.) The second-in-command was Major Claudius Shaw, formerly RA, a veteran of the Peninsular War, the War of 1812 and of the British Auxiliary Legion in the First Carlist War. Most of the original Captains had been infantry or cavalry officers.

== Service ==
=== Crimean War ===
The new regiment assembled at Gosport on 4 April 1854 for its first 28-day annual training. War having broken out with Russia and an expeditionary force sent to the Crimea, the militia began to be embodied for permanent service later that year. The Hampshire Militia Artillery was embodied at Fort Monckton, Gosport, from 7 December 1854. Over the following weeks the companies went to their stations: one company to the Browndown Batteries, one to Fort Blockhouse and one to Hurst Castle. On 8 March 1855 the headquarters (HQ) and remaining companies moved to the Royal Artillery Barracks, Woolwich. It was due to be joined by the companies from Fort Blockhouse and Hurst Castle, but an error in drafting the 1852 Act led to large numbers of militiamen taking their discharge, including 174 of the Hampshire Artillery. The reduced corps was sent back to Hampshire to occupy Southsea Castle, with two companies detached to Fort Blockhouse and later two to Browndown. Meanwhile, recruiting parties toured the county seeking volunteers to bring the unit back to strength.

In July No 2 Company was moved from Fort Blockhouse to Hurst Castle, with a detachment doing duty with the Regular RA at Point Battery Barracks. On 21 July No 2 Company became the first militia artillery unit to fire a Royal Salute when Queen Victoria and Prince Albert's vessel passed Hurst Castle. (An application for the unit to be given the prefix 'Royal' as a result was turned down.) During August militiamen were encouraged to transfer to the Regular Army, and 51 men of the Hampshire Artillery did so, mainly to the RA and Royal Marines, followed by another 45 in February 1856. Other duties carried out by the unit included embarking guns and stores at Cowes on the Isle of Wight and mounting guard on the Gunpowder magazines at Marchwood outside Southampton.

The war was ended by the Treaty of Paris on 30 March 1856. On 23 April the Queen reviewed the Fleet in Spithead, during which the Hampshire Artillery manned the guns at Fort Monckton and the Browndown Batteries to 'repel' a sham attack by the Fleet. In late May the companies were recalled and went into billets in Gosport preparatory to be disembodied. This was carried out on 5 June and the men were dismissed to their homes with a gratuity.

Annual training resumed in 1858. The Hampshire Artillery maintained a training battery of six obsolete 6-pounder field guns at Gosport, which were fired on Anglesea Common.

=== Indian Mutiny ===
As soon as the 1858 training ended on 10 October the Hampshire Militia Artillery was embodied next day to supplement the Regulars while a large expeditionary force was absent fighting the Indian Mutiny. Its strength was only 17 officers and 239 other ranks (ORs). On 18 October it went by special train to Plymouth, where it was quartered in Granby and Raglan Barracks, Devonport, supplying guards for the dockyard and gates. On 27 October one company was sent by steamer round the coast to Falmouth where it garrisoned Pendennis Castle, and another company was detailed for duty at Drake's Island in Plymouth Sound. In January 1859 the corps received new rifled carbines, and a party attended the School of Musketry at Hythe, Kent, for instruction. The corps was redeployed in the spring of 1859, with HQ and two companies joining the company at Pendennis Castle while the remaining two companies went by rail to Pembroke Dock in Wales, taking over the Star Fort. A month later the whole corps was concentrated at Pembroke Dock. Its main duty was guarding the dockyard, which it shared with a depot battalion. On occasions it was allowed practice firing on the 32-pounder guns of one of the forts, under the adjutant, a former Sergeant-Major in the Regular RA.

In the autumn of 1860 the Hampshire Artillery returned to Gosport and in October it was disembodied.

Annual training was resumed in October 1862, the recruits undergoing 14 days' preliminary drill at the depot at Gosport Barracks, then the whole corps doing 21 days' training at Haslar Barracks. In 1863 the training was carried out in April at Fort Elson. This then became the pattern: training in April, usually at Fort Elson or Fort Grange and in later years at Fort Monckton and Fort Gomer. Recruit training increased to 28 days in 1871 and 60 days the following year, and later the non-commissioned officers (NCOs) underwent 28 days' training before the regiment assembled.

In 1867 the Militia Reserve was introduced, consisting of present and former militiamen who undertook to serve with the Regulars in case of war. This was called out in April 1878 during the international crisis following the Russo-Turkish War. At that date 119 men of the Hampshire Militia Artillery were liable to service and only five failed to present themselves. After medical examination 89 were posted to the Royal Artillery.

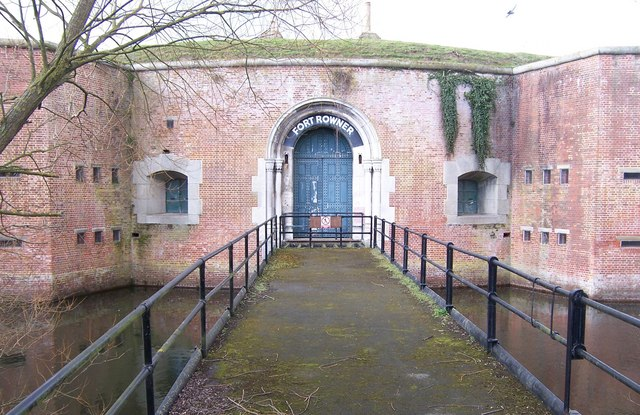
Fort Rowner

Recruiting for the Hampshire Militia Artillery was so good in the winter of 1881–82 that a sixth battery was added to it. The permanent staff was increased to 2 officers, 1 warrant officer, 17 sergeants and 6 trumpeters, with an establishment of 619 all ranks. The HQ of the unit was established at Fort Rowner in the early 1880s.

== Reorganisation ==
The Royal Artillery and Militia Artillery were reorganised on 14 April 1882, when 11 territorial divisions of garrison artillery were formed, each consisting of a number of brigades. (Note: In contemporary RA terminology, a 'brigade' was a group of batteries grouped together for administrative rather than tactical purposes, the officer in command normally being a lieutenant-colonel rather than a brigadier-general or major-general, the ranks usually associated with command of an infantry or cavalry brigade.) In each division the 1st Brigade was composed of Regular RA batteries, the others being a varying number of militia corps. The Hampshire unit became the senior militia unit in the new Southern Division, taking the title of 2nd Brigade, Southern Division, RA.

The brigade was one of only two artillery militia units embodied during the Panjdeh crisis of 1885, serving from 9 March to 30 September. The brigade was deployed to man guns as follows:

- Sub-District I: Forts Elson and Brockhurst
- Sub-District II: Forts Rowner and Grange
- Sub-District III: Fort Gomer and the five batteries in the Stokes Bay Lines
- Sub-District IV: Forts Gilkicker and Monckton

Normal annual training resumed in 1886, with the gun practice being carried out at Lumps Fort.

== Amalgamation ==
Recruitment had become a problem in Hampshire, and in January 1889 the unit was permitted to enlist men from the two neighbouring counties in the RA's Southern Division, Dorset and Wiltshire. Nevertheless, it had to be reduced from six to five batteries (516 men) in September 1889. On 1 July 1889 the RA divisions had been reduced to three and the brigade numbers abandoned. The unit at Gosport became the 'Hampshire Artillery, Southern Division, RA.

In 1890 two machine guns were issued to the brigade, and its training that year practised mobilisation to man the Needles defences on the Isle of Wight. It went by steamer from Gunwharf to Yarmouth and then marched to Freshwater. Four batteries went into camp with 4th Battalion, Rifle Brigade, and one to man Freshwater Redoubt. During practice alarms the batteries went to their fighting stations, with the machine guns attached to the Rifle Brigade, while the guns of the Needles defences 'engaged' the 'hostile fleet'. The following year the training was at Fort Wallington, near Fareham, with gun practice at Lumps Fort.

One of the intentions of the 1882 organisation into divisions had been to train the recruits centrally, and to encourage militiamen to volunteer for the Regulars. The number of men transferring to the Regular RA each year was so large that the Hampshire Artillery could not maintain its strength. On 1 October 1891 the Hampshire and the Isle of Wight artillery (the 'Duke of Connaught's Own' since 1875) amalgamated to form the Duke of Connaught's Own Hampshire and Isle of Wight Artillery, of four companies with HQ at Sandown, Isle of Wight.

== Commanders ==
=== Honorary Colonel ===
The following served as Honorary Colonel of the corps:

- James Harris, 3rd Earl of Malmesbury, appointed 22 June 1854, resigned 22 November 1884
- Henry Wellesley, 3rd Duke of Wellington, appointed 22 November 1884, continued as co-colonel of the Duke of Connaught's Own after amalgamation in 1891

=== Lieutenant-Colonel Commandant ===
The following officers commanded the corps:

- Richard Beaumont Burnaby, retired Lt-Col RA, appointed 30 May 1853, died 6 September 1871
- Samuel H.S. Inglefield, half-pay Lt-Col RA, appointed 6 September 1871; transferred to 2nd Brigade, North Irish Division, 19 January 1884
- Francis Charles Hughes-Hallett, retired Lt-Col RA, transferred from 2nd Brigade, North Irish Division, 19 January 1884; resigned 20 July 1889
- Maitland Moore-Lane, retired Lt-Col RA, continued in Duke of Connaught's Own after amalgamation in 1891

=== Other notable officers ===
- Arthur Robert Naghten, MP for Winchester, senior Lieutenant on first raising

== Heritage and ceremonial ==
=== Uniform and insignia ===
The uniform of the militia artillery conformed to that of the Regular RA, being blue with red facings, except that silver lace was worn in place of gold. The Hampshire was one of the few militia artillery units to have its own buttons. In white metal (silver for officers) they had a scalloped edge with the Hampshire rose in place of the usual crown above the three cannons of the Board of Ordnance. The officers' black leather helmet with horsehair plume bore a plate with a 'bomb' above crossed guns, and their pouchbelt plate was of the standard RA pattern but the scroll beneath was inscribed 'HANTS ARTILLERY' in place of the RA motto 'UBIQUE'. The other ranks wore a bell-topped shako with a simplified version of the helmet plate. During the Crimean War all ranks adopted the busby as the headgear in full dress uniform.

When the Home Service helmet was introduced for officers and permanent staff in 1882 it carried the standard RA plate with of the Royal Arms above a gun, but the scroll beneath was inscribed 'SOUTHERN DIVISION' in place of the RA motto. 'HANTS ARTILLERY" or 'HAMPSHIRE ARTILLERY' replaced this in 1889.

=== Precedence ===
When the militia artillery corps were first formed in 1853 they were assigned an order of precedence based on alphabetical order: Hampshire and the Isle of Wight were 16th and 17th. When the two units amalgamated, they took the precedence of 17th (even though the 16th place remained vacant).
