= Quarr Hill =

Coordinates: 50.7300°N 1.1954°W

Quarr Hill: Quarr
- Suburb
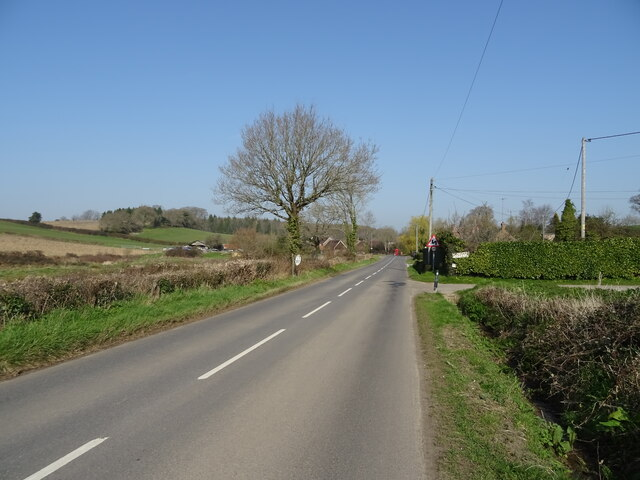
- The B3075 running through Quarr Hill

- Location within the Isle of Wight
- OS grid reference: SZ5687792579
- Civil parish: Ryde; Fishbourne
- Unitary authority: Isle of Wight Council
- Ceremonial county: Isle of Wight
- Region: South East
- Country: England
- Sovereign state: United Kingdom
- Post town: RYDE
- Postcode district: PO33
- Police: Hampshire and Isle of Wight
- Fire: Hampshire and Isle of Wight
- Ambulance: Isle of Wight
- UK Parliament: Isle of Wight East

Quarr Hill is a small suburb of the town of Ryde, on the Isle of Wight. It is situated 1.4 miles (2.3 km) west of the centre of Ryde and 1 mile (1.6 km) east of Fishbourne village. It is located 15 metres (49 feet) above sea level. It is the location of Quarr Abbey.

== Name ==
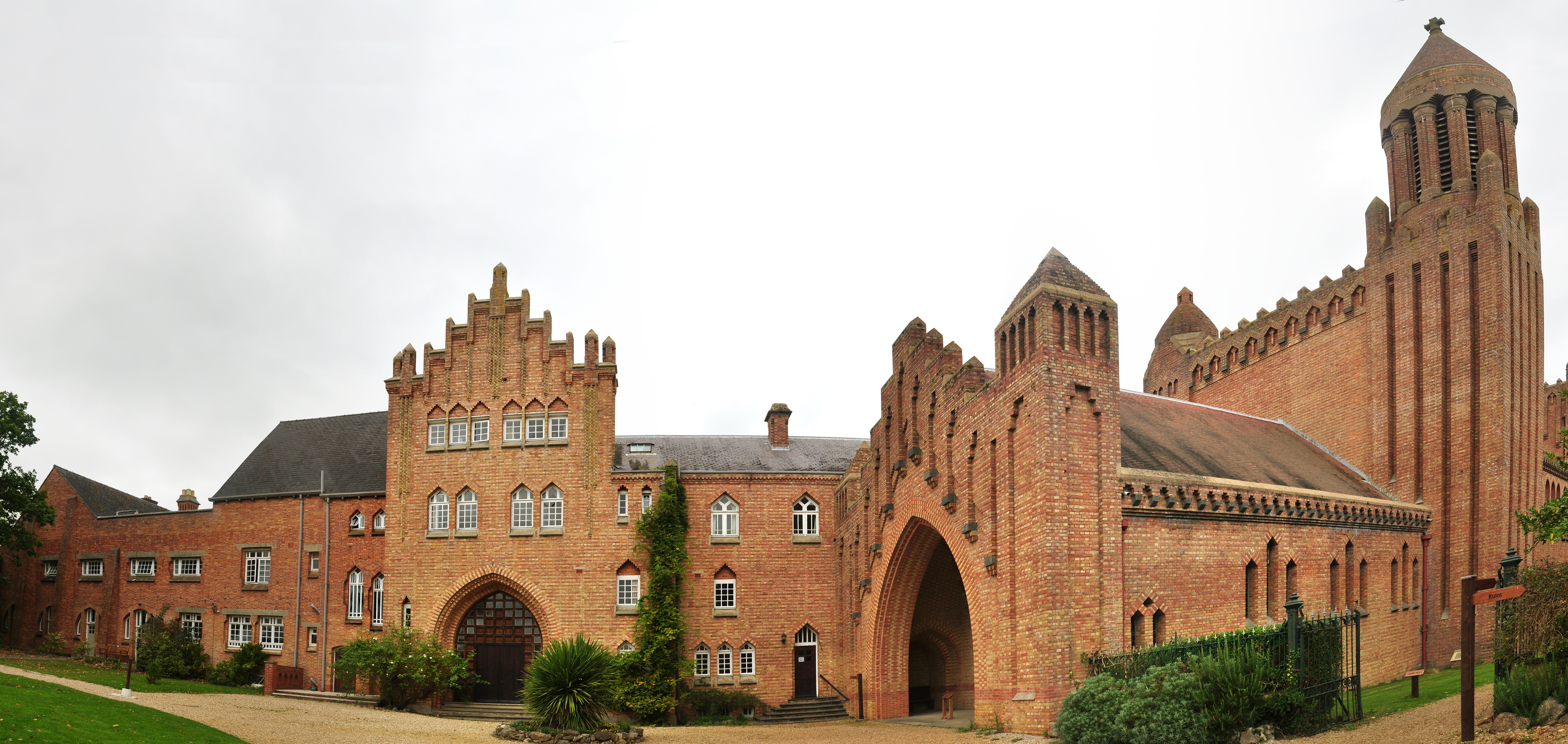
Quarr Abbey, in Quarr Hill.

The name means 'the quarries', from Old French quarr(i)ere. In the earliest forms, the name is latinised. It was named after the quarry that supplied the stone to build the original chapel (now in ruin, since the 16th century) of Quarr Abbey.

c.1140: Quarreria, Quarera

1142-1147: Quadraria

1166: Quarere

1247: Quarr

1266: Quarre

1769: Quarry (Abby)
