= Sir George Courtenay, 1st Baronet =

Irish Baronet (died 1644)

George Courtenay
- Baronet Courtenay of Newcastle
- Tenure: 1622–1644
- Successor: Sir William Courtenay, 2nd Baronet
- Born: Between 1580 and 1585
- Died: 1644
- Spouse: Catherine Berkeley
- Issue Detail: William, and others
- Father: William Courtenay (died 1630)
- Mother: Elizabeth Manners

Sir George Oughtred Courtenay, 1st Baronet, of Newcastle (c. 1585 – 1644) was an Irish landowner and soldier. He defended Limerick at the siege of 1642 during the Irish Rebellion of 1641.

== Birth and origins ==
George was born between 1580 and 1585, the fourth son of William Courtenay and his first wife, Elizabeth Manners. His father was a member of the Devonshire gentry but would much later in 1831 be recognised as de jure 3rd Earl of Devon. His father's family was the English branch of the House of Courtenay. His mother was a daughter of Henry Manners, 2nd Earl of Rutland in England.

Family tree

George Courtenay with wife, parents, and other selected relatives. (Note: This family tree is based on a Courtenay pedigree Also see the list children in the text.)

William; Courtenay c. 1529 – 1557	Elizabeth; Paulet c. 1533 – 1576	Henry; Oughtred c. 1533 – 1599
William; Courtenay; 1553–1630	Elizabeth; Manners	Francis; Berkeley d. 1615 of Askeaton
Francis; Courtenay; 1576–1638	George; 1st Baronet; 1585 – 1644	Catherine; Berkeley
William; 1st Baronet; 1628–1702	William; 2nd Baronet; 1616–1652	Francis; 3rd Baronet; 1617–1660
Francis; Courtenay d. 1699 d.v.p.*	William; 4th Baronet c. 1659 – c. 1700

Legend

XXX	Subject of the article	XXX	Courtenay; Irish Baronets	XXX	Courtenay; English Bts

*d.v.p. = predeceased his father (decessit vita patris)

== Plantation of Munster ==
His father was an undertaker in the Plantation of Munster after the Desmond Rebellions and was in 1585 granted the seignory of Newcastle, 10,500 acres, in the Barony of Connello, in the western part of County Limerick.

Between 1598 and 1611 Courtenay bought the seignories of Mayne (south east of Newcastle) and Beauly (also called Muskrinownan) from Sir Henry Oughtred's heirs, increasing his lands in Munster from 10,500 to 33,678 acres. Oughtred had died childless in 1599 and was his father's stepfather.

== Marriage and children ==
George Courtenay married Catherine Berkeley before 1616. Her father was Francis Berkeley of Askeaton, County Limerick, third son of Maurice Berkeley of Bruton in Somerset. Her uncle Captain Edward Berkeley had in 1585 or 1586 been made Constable of Askeaton Castle, which had been taken by the English in April 1580 soon after the beginning of the Second Desmond Rebellion.

George and Catherine had three sons:

1. William (1616–1652), 2nd Baronet, died without son
2. Francis (1617–1660), 3rd Baronet
3. Morris, died without issue

== Baronet ==
In 1622 Courtenay was created 1st Baronet Courtenay of Newcastle, County Limerick. In that year he was also appointed constable of Limerick Castle. His father died on 24 June 1630. His elder brother Francis Courtenay became de jure Earl of Devon and inherited the English lands. George inherited the Irish land.

== Siege of Limerick ==
In May and June 1642, Courtenay defended King John's Castle, Limerick, against the Munster rebels under General Garret Barry, Patrick Purcell of Croagh, Lord Muskerry, and Maurice Roche, 8th Viscount Fermoy. The besiegers attacked the eastern wall and the bastion on its south-east corner by digging mines. Courtenay surrendered the castle on 21 June and Muskerry took possession.

== Loss of Newcastle ==
In July and August 1642 Purcell besieged Newcastle, Courtenay's seat, which fell on 6 August after a cannon had been brought from Limerick.

== Death and timeline ==
Sir George died in 1644. He was succeeded by his eldest surviving son, Sir William Courtenay, 2nd Baronet.

Timeline
As his birth date is uncertain, so are all his ages. Italics for historical background.
Age	Date	Event
0	1580–1585	Born
17–18	29 May 1601	The Súgán earl, James FitzThomas FitzGerald is captured.
17–18	22 Sep 1601	The Spanish landed at Kinsale
19–20	24 Mar 1603	Accession of James I, succeeding Elizabeth I
32–33	1616	Married Catherine Berkeley
38–39	Jan 1622	Created Baronet Courtenay of Newcastle
41–42	27 Mar 1625	Accession of Charles I, succeeding James I
46–47	24 Jun 1630	Father died in London.
60–61	21 Jun 1642	Surrendered King John's Castle, Limerick
60–61	1644	Died

== Notes and references ==
=== Sources ===
- Adams, Constance Louisa (1904). Castles of Ireland – Some Fortress Histories and Legends. London: Elliot Stock. OCLC 751487142.
- Cokayne, George Edward (1900). Complete Baronetage, 1611 to 1800. Vol. I (1st ed.). Exeter: William Pollard & Co. OCLC 866278985. – 1611 to 1625
- Cokayne, George Edward (1916). Gibbs, Vicary (ed.). The complete peerage of England, Scotland, Ireland, Great Britain and the United Kingdom, extant, extinct, or dormant. Vol. IV (2nd ed.). London: The St Catherine Press. OCLC 228661424. – Dacre to Dysart (for his father as de jure Earl of Devon)
- Colby, Frederic Thomas, ed. (1872). The Visitation of the County of Devon in the Year 1620. London: The Harleian Society. OCLC 3975627.
- Dunlop, Robert (1924). "An Unpublished Survey of the Plantation of Munster". The Journal of the Royal Society of Antiquaries of Ireland. 14 (2): 128–146. JSTOR 25513334.
- Fryde, E. B.; Greenway, D. E.; Porter, S.; Roy, I., eds. (1986). Handbook of British Chronology. Royal Historical Society Guides and Handbooks, No. 2 (3rd ed.). London: Offices of the Royal Historical Society. ISBN 0-86193-106-8. – (for timeline)
- Hamilton, Hans Claude, ed. (1877). Calendar of the State Papers Relating to Ireland, of the Reign of Elizabeth, 1586–1588, July. London: Longman & Co.
- Joyce, Patrick Weston (1903). A Concise History of Ireland from the Earliest Times to 1837 (12th ed.). Dublin: M. H. Gill & Son. OCLC 815623752.
- MacCarthy-Morrogh, Michael (1986). The Munster Plantation. Oxford: Clarendon Press. ISBN 0-19-822952-6.
- M'Enery, M. J. (1904). "A Diary of the Siege of Limerick Castle, 1642". The Journal of the Royal Society of Antiquaries of Ireland. 5th. 34 (2): 163–187. JSTOR 25507363.
- Westropp, Thomas Johnson (1903). "Notes on Askeaton, County Limerick: Part II. The History after 1579". The Journal of the Royal Society of Antiquaries of Ireland. 33 (2): 153–174. JSTOR 25507288.
- Westropp, Thomas Johnson (1907). "The Principal Ancient Castles of the County Limerick: Part II Tudor Period". The Journal of the Royal Society of Antiquaries of Ireland. 37 (2): 153–164. JSTOR 25507604.
- Wiggins, Kenneth (2001). Anatomy of a Siege: King John's Castle, Limerick, 1642. London: The Boydell Press. ISBN 0-85115-827-7. – (Preview)

Baronetage of Ireland
New creation	Baronet (of Newcastle); 1622 – 1652	Succeeded by William Courtenay
