= William Courtenay (died 1630) =

Member of the Parliament of England

Sir William Courtenay
- Arms of Sir William Courtenay (1553–1630) of Powderham: Quarterly 1st & 4th, Or, three torteaux gules (Courtenay); 2nd & 3rd: Or, a lion rampant azure (Redvers)
- Born: June 1553
- Died: 24 June 1630 (aged 76–77); London, England
- Resting place: St Clement's Church, Powderham, Devon; 50.6503°N 3.4547°W
- Occupations: MP, lawyer
- Spouses: Elizabeth Manners; Elizabeth Sydenham; Jane Hill
- Children: Sir William Courtenay; Francis Courtenay; Thomas Courtenay; George Courtenay; John Courtenay; Alexander Courtenay; Edward Courtenay; Margaret Courtenay; Bridget Courtenay; Elizabeth Courtenay
- Parent(s): Sir William Courtenay; Elizabeth Paulet

Sir William Courtenay (June 1553 – 24 June 1630) of Powderham in Devon was a prominent member of the Devonshire gentry. He was Sheriff of Devon in 1579–80 and received the rare honour of having been three times elected MP for the prestigious county seat (Devon) in 1584, 1589 and 1601.

== Origins ==
He was the only son and heir of Sir William Courtenay (c. 1529 – 1557) of Powderham, MP for Plympton Erle in 1555, by Elizabeth, daughter of John Paulet, 2nd Marquess of Winchester. His sister Jane married Sir Nicholas Parker. After his father's death, his mother subsequently married Sir Henry Ughtred, son of Sir Anthony Ughtred and his second wife, Elizabeth Seymour, sister to Jane, third consort of Henry VIII.

== Career ==
In 1557 at the age of 4, he succeeded his father. He trained as a lawyer in the Middle Temple. He was knighted on 25 March 1576, and in 1577 was commissioned as one of two Colonels of the East Division of the Devon Trained Bands. He served as Sheriff of Devon for 1579–80 and was also involved in the Munster Plantation in Ireland in the 1580s, being granted Desmond Hall and Castle in Newcastle West. Sir William was elected as a Member of Parliament for Devon in 1584, 1589 and 1601. In 1831 he was recognised by a retrospective decision of the House of Lords as having been de jure 3rd Earl of Devon.

== Marriages and issue ==
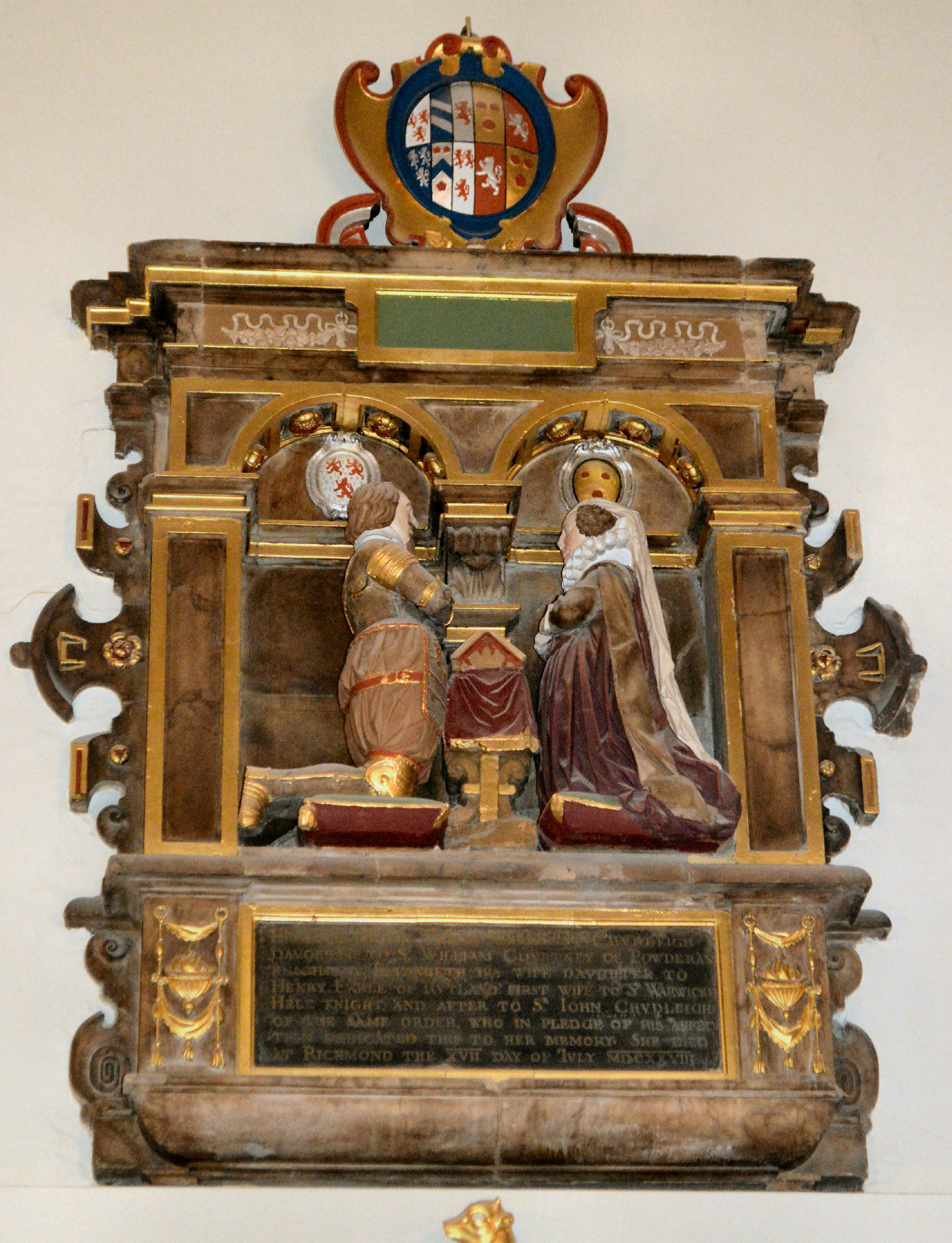
Mural monument to Margaret Courtenay, eldest daughter of Sir William Courtenay by Elizabeth Manners, kneeling effigy with her second husband Sir John Chudleigh; St Mary Magdalene's Church, Richmond, Surrey (de Redvers arms with incorrectly restored tinctures)

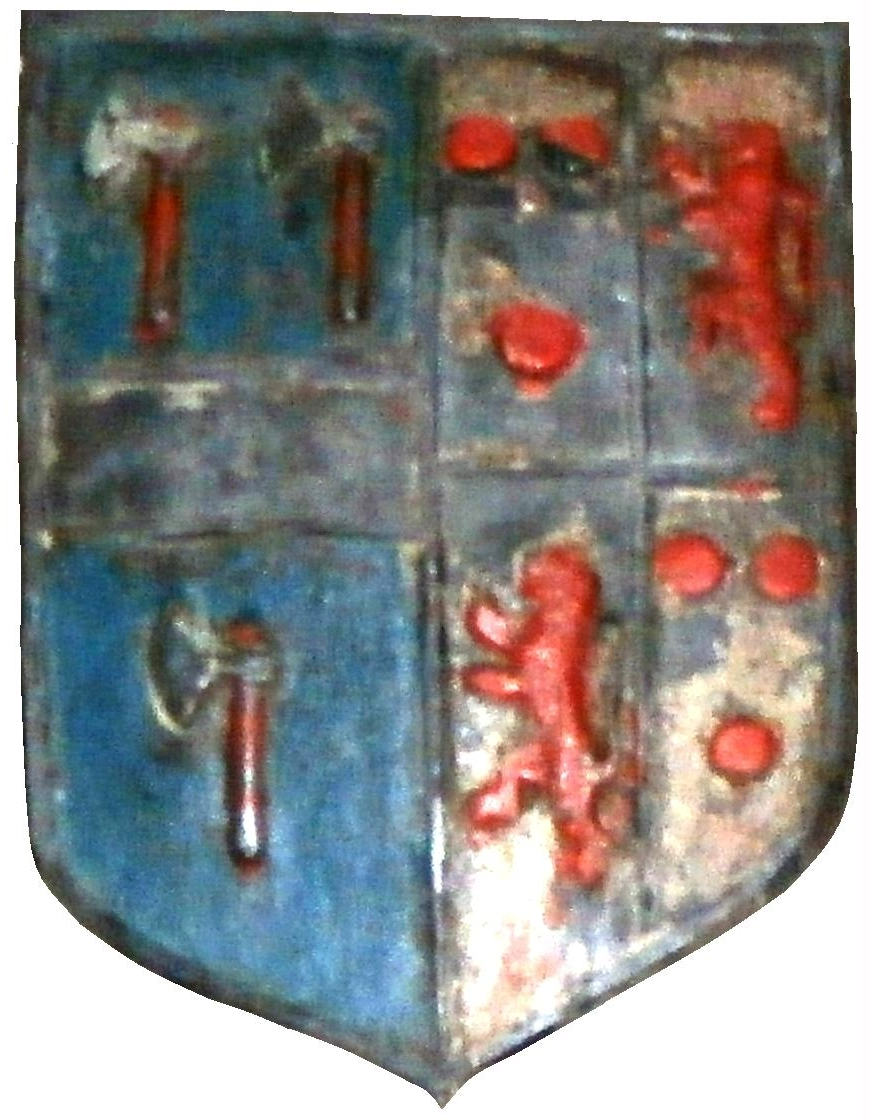
Arms of Sir William Wrey, 1st Baronet (d.1636), impaling Courtenay of Powderham, for his wife was Elizabeth Courtenay, 3rd daughter of Sir William Courtenay. Detail from monument of his father John Wrey (d. 1597) in Tawstock Church, Devon (with incorrectly restored tinctures)

He married three times:

=== First marriage ===
He married firstly, around 18 January 1573, Elizabeth Manners, a daughter of Henry Manners, 2nd Earl of Rutland, and by her had seven sons and three daughters:

- Sir William Courtenay, (died 1603), eldest son and heir apparent, knighted 1599, died without progeny and predeceased his father.
- Francis Courtenay, (1576 – 3 Jun 1638), of Powderham, MP, 2nd but eldest surviving son and heir. In 1831 he was recognised retrospectively as having been de jure 4th Earl of Devon.
- Thomas Courtenay
- Sir George Oughtred Courtenay(born c. 1580–85), 1st Baronet of Newcastle, Limerick, married by 1616, Catherine, daughter of Francis Berkeley of Askeaton, Limerick, and by her had three sons:

- Sir William Courtenay (born c. 1616), 2nd Baronet
- Francis Courtenay (born c. 1617)
- Morris Courtenay

- John Courtenay
- Alexander Courtenay
- Edward Courtenay
- Margaret Courtenay, eldest daughter, whose mural monument with kneeling effigy survives in St Mary Magdalene's Church, Richmond, Surrey. She married firstly Sir Warwick Hele (1568-1626) of Wembury in Devon, MP, secondly Sir John Chudleigh (born 1584), knighted by King Charles I 22 Sept 1625, 3rd son of John Chudleigh (1565-1589) of Ashton, Devon, and younger brother of Sir George Chudleigh, 1st Baronet (d.1656).
- Bridget Courtenay, who married Sir John Fitz and gave birth to Lady Mary Fitz (1596–1671)
- Elizabeth Courtenay, 3rd daughter, who married Sir William Wrey, 1st Baronet of Tawstock in Devon. Her father's arms survive, impaled by Wrey, on the monument of her father-in-law John Wrey (d.1597) in Tawstock Church.

=== Second marriage ===
He married secondly Elizabeth (d. 1598), a daughter of Sir George Sydenham of Combe Sydenham in Somerset and widow of Sir Francis Drake (d. 1596).

=== Third marriage ===
Thirdly he married Jane Hill, a daughter of Robert Hill of Taunton, Somerset.

== Death ==
He died in London on 24 June 1630 and was buried in Powderham Church, Devon. He was succeeded by his son, Francis.

== Sources ==
- Colby, Frederic Thomas, ed. (1872). The Visitation of the County of Devon in the Year 1620. Publications of the Harleian Society. Vol. VI. London: Harleian Society.
- Crossle, Philip (2002). The Courtenay family in Ireland / compiled by Philip Crossle, et al.; with transcriptions of notes, letters, and other genealogical material added by St. John Courtenay III (PDF) (3rd ed.). Arlington: Courtenay Publications. Archived from the original (PDF) on 5 January 2007.
- Foster, Joseph, ed. (1887). London Marriage Licences, 1521-1869. From Excerpts by the Late Colonel Chester, D.C.L. London: Bernard Quaritch.
- Fuidge, N. M. (1981). "Ughtred, Henry (by 1534-aft. Oct. 1598), of Southampton and Ireland". In Hasler, P.W. (ed.). Members. The History of Parliament: The House of Commons 1558–1603. Historyofparliamentonline.org.
- Hasler, P.W. (1981). "Courtenay, Sir William I (1553-1630), of Powderham, Devon". In Hasler, P.W. (ed.). Members. The History of Parliament: The House of Commons 1558–1603. Historyofparliamentonline.org.
- Hawkyard, A.D.K. (1982). "Courtenay, Sir William II (1529/30-57), of Powderham, Devon and London". In Bindoff, S.T. (ed.). The History of Parliament: the House of Commons 1509-1558. historyofparliamentonline.org.
- Hoskins, W.G. (1959). Devon. A New Survey of England. London: Collins. OCLC 313455481.
- Mosley, Charles, ed. (2003). Burke's Peerage, Baronetage and Knightage. Vol. 1 (107th ed.). Wilmington: Burke's Peerage & Gentry LLC. ISBN 0971196621.
- Sanders, I.J. (1960). English Baronies: A Study of their Origin and Descent, 1086-1327. Oxford: Clarendon Press. OCLC 2437348.
- Shaw, W.A.; Burtchaell, B.D. (1906). The Knights of England: A Complete Record from the Earliest Time to the Present Day of the Knights of All the Orders of Chivalry in England, Scotland, and Ireland, and of Knights Bachelors, Incorporating a Complete List of Knights Bachelors Dubbed in Ireland. Vol. II. London: Sherratt and Hughes.
- Vivian, J.L. (1895). The Visitations of the County of Devon, Comprising the Heralds' Visitations of 1531, 1564, to 1620, with additions by J.L. Vivian. Exeter: H.S. Eland.
- Col Henry Walrond, Historical Records of the 1st Devon Militia (4th Battalion The Devonshire Regiment), With a Notice of the 2nd and North Devon Militia Regiments, London: Longmans, 1897/Andesite Press, 2015, ISBN 978-1-37617881-4.

Peerage of England
Preceded by William Courtenay	Earl of Devon de jure 1557 – 1630	Succeeded by Francis Courtenay
