= Francis Courtenay =

Francis Courtenay may refer to:

- Francis Courtenay (died 1638) (1576–1638), MP
- Francis Courtenay (died 1699), his grandson, MP
- Sir Francis Courtenay, 3rd Baronet (1617–1660), of the Courtenay baronets
