= Henry Ughtred =

The Honourable Sir Henry Ughtred
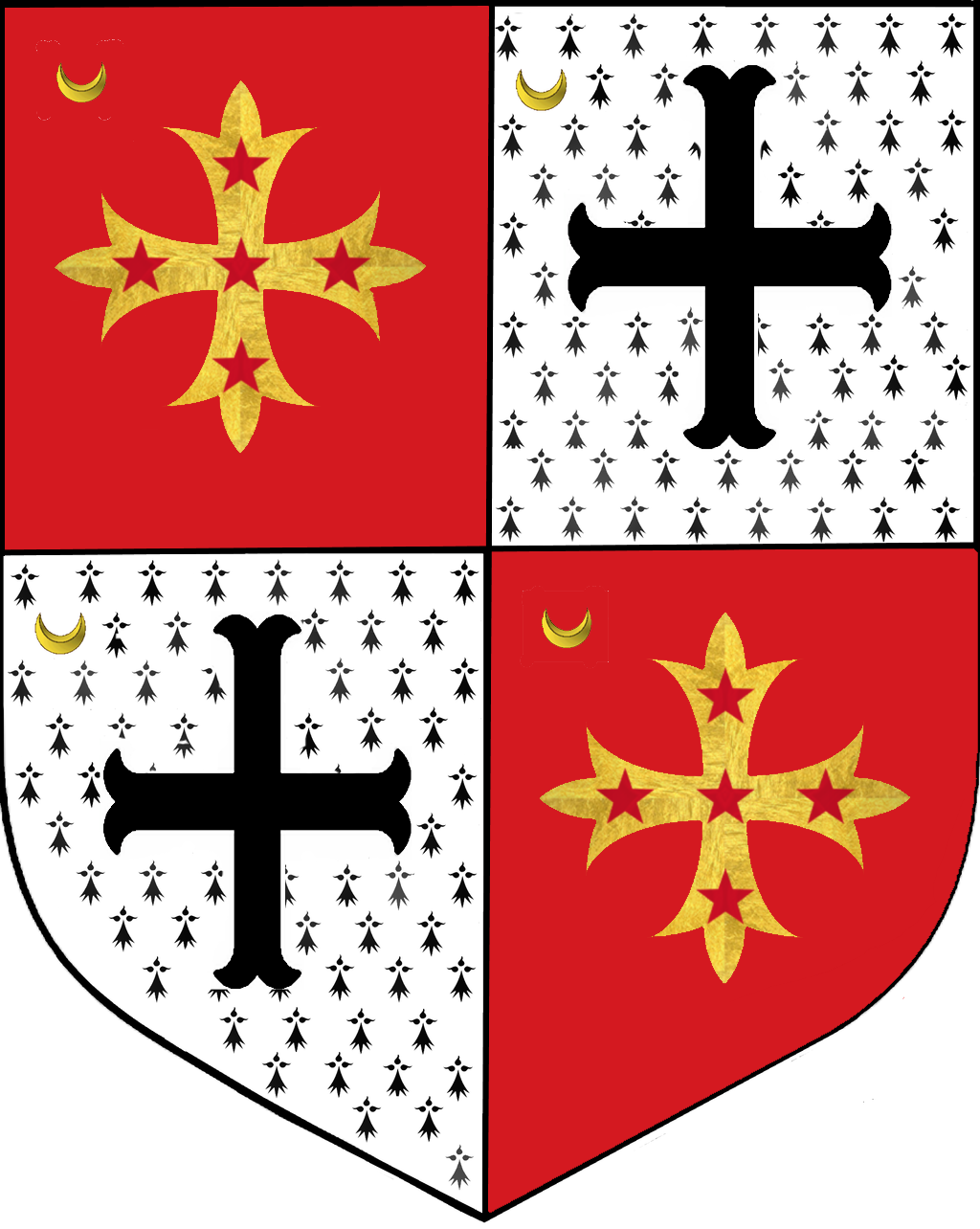
- Arms of Ughtred, Kexby: Gules, on a cross patonce Or, five mullets of the first.

Member of Parliament for Marlborough
- In office 1584–1585

Member of Parliament for Great Bedwyn
- In office 1589–1589

Personal details
- Born: c. 1533
- Died: June 1599 (aged 65–66) Limerick, Kingdom of Ireland
- Spouse: Elizabeth Paulet (m. 1557; died 1576)
- Parents: Sir Anthony Ughtred; Elizabeth Seymour

Sir Henry Ughtred or Oughtred (c. 1533 – June 1599) was a merchant and shipbuilder during the reign of Elizabeth I. One of his ships, the Leicester, sailed with Sir Francis Drake against the Spanish Armada. Ughtred was elected MP for the seat of Marlborough in 1584 and of Great Bedwyn in 1589. A wealthy landowner, Ughtred played an active role in the Plantations of Ireland and was knighted by the Lord Deputy in 1593. He was the son of Sir Anthony Ughtred and Elizabeth Seymour, sister to Jane, the third wife of Henry VIII. Sometime after 1557 he married Elizabeth, widow of Sir William Courtenay and daughter of John Paulet, 2nd Marquess of Winchester.

== Family ==
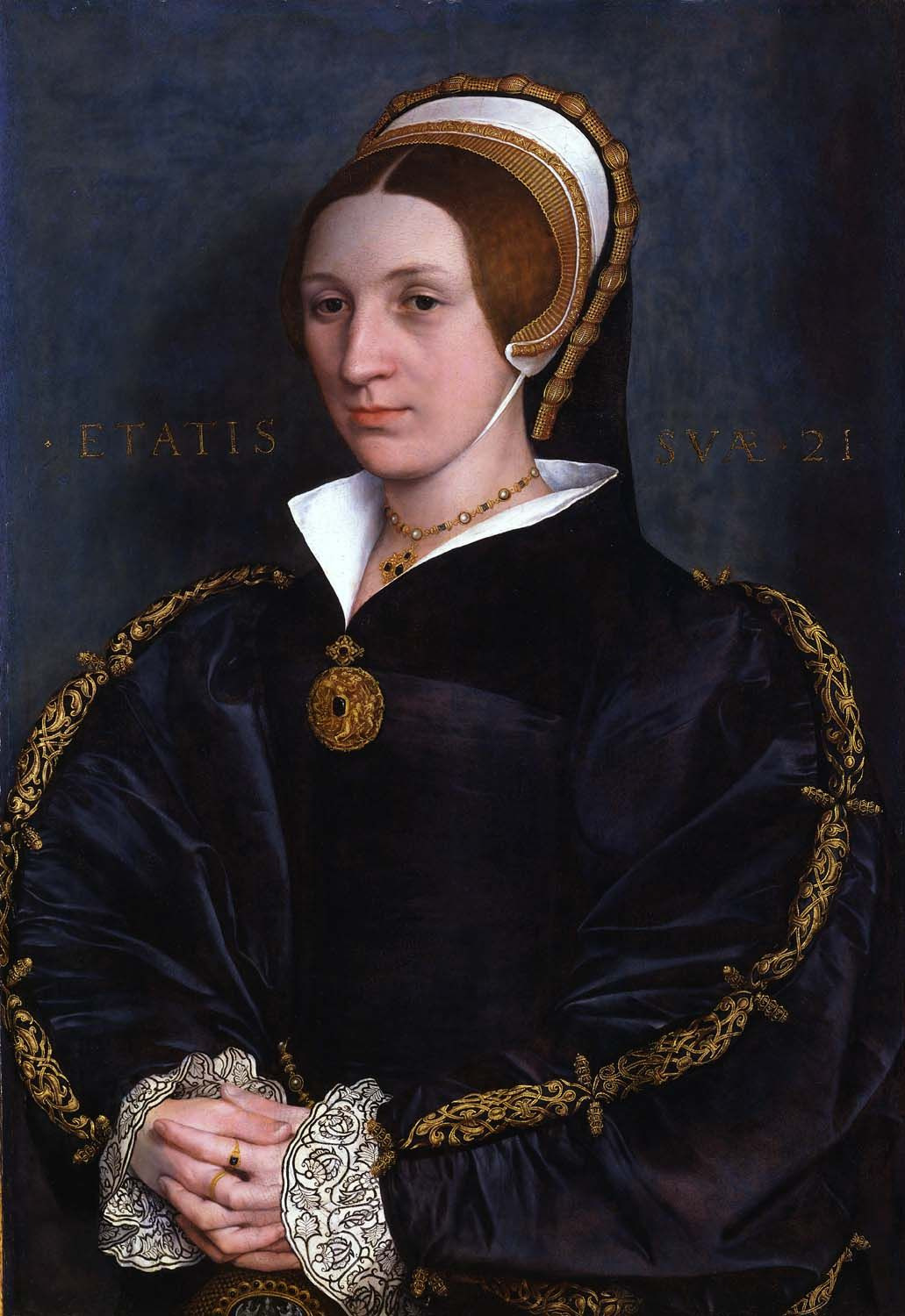
Portrait of a Lady, probably a Member of the Cromwell Family, perhaps Elizabeth Seymour, c.1535–1540, Hans Holbein.

Henry Ughtred was born around 1533 at the castle of Mont Orgueil, also known as Gorey Castle, on the island of Jersey. He was the son of Sir Anthony Ughtred, governor of Jersey and Elizabeth Seymour, daughter to Sir John Seymour of Wolf Hall, Wiltshire and Margery, daughter to Sir Henry Wentworth. Sir Anthony Ughtred died in Jersey on 6 October 1534 and was buried in the chapel of St George, in the castle of Mont Orgueil. After her husband's death, his mother returned to Kexby, Yorkshire. The manor of Kexby had been granted for life to Sir Anthony Ughtred and his wife by Henry VIII in 1531 and it was here that Henry's sister Margery was probably born. Margery Ughtred later married William Hungate of Burnby, Yorkshire and had two sons, William and Leonard.

In 1537 his mother married Gregory Cromwell, later Baron Cromwell, the son and heir of Henry VIII's chief minister Thomas Cromwell. After Cromwell's death in 1551, she married, in 1554, Sir John Paulet, later Baron St. John, the eldest son of William Paulet, 1st Marquess of Winchester. She died 19 March 1568 and was buried at St. Mary's church in Basing, Hampshire.

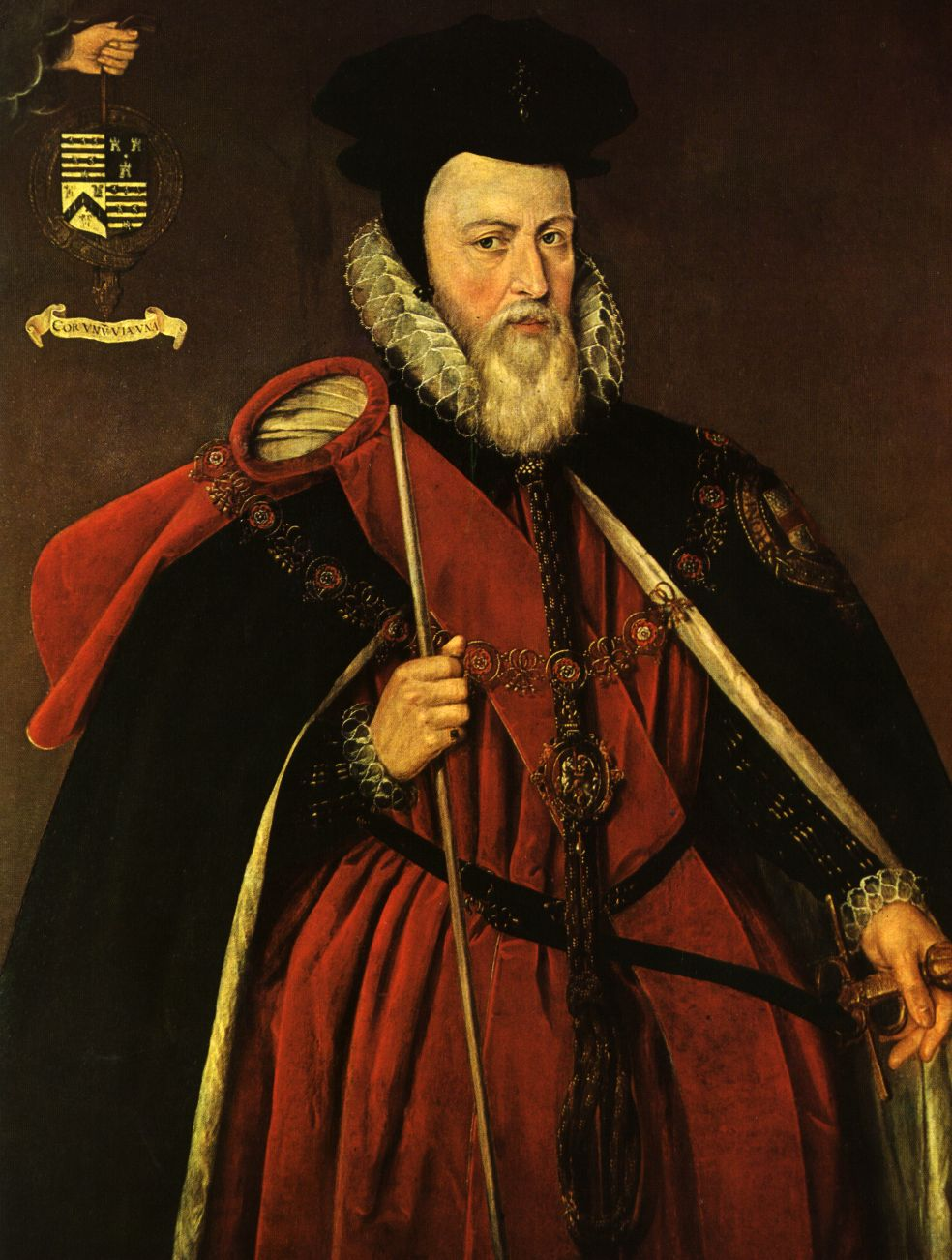
William Cecil 1st Baron Burghley

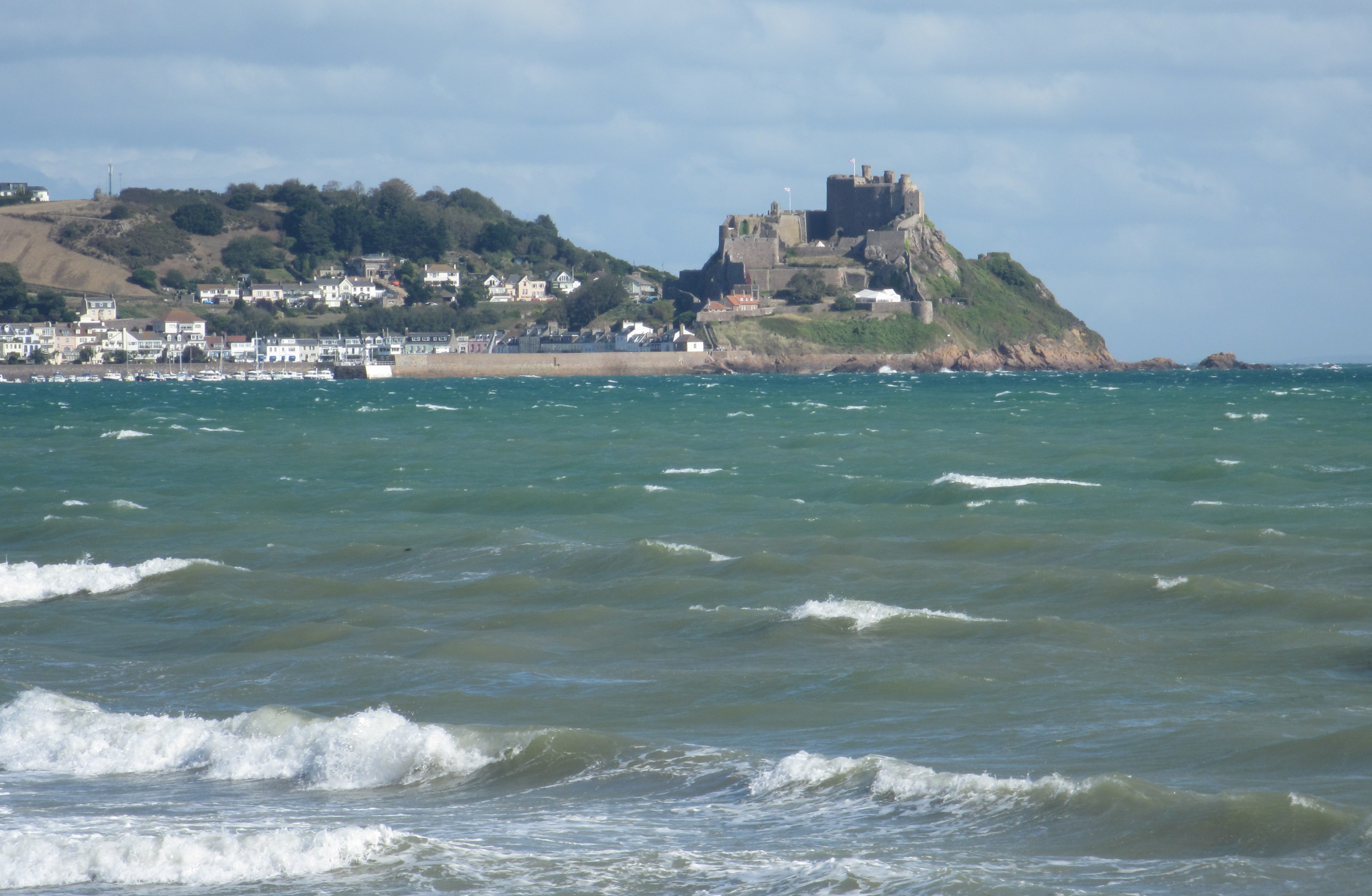
Castle of Mont Orgueil overlooking Gorey Harbour, St. Martin, Jersey

After the death of his step-father, John Paulet, 2nd Marquess of Winchester, in 1576, Ughtred was involved in a long-running, bitter dispute with his step-brother, William Paulet, 3rd Marquess of Winchester, who accused him, as an executor of his father's will, of maladministration of the property and failure to settle the claims of a number of tenants and servants. Paulet took the matter to William Cecil, 1st Baron Burghley, and in June 1582 Ughtred wrote to Lord Burghley to defend himself, complaining of "hard words", which Burghley had used in the Star Chamber. He maintained that the Marquess's accusations were unjust and informed Burghley that he was now virtually a prisoner in his own house and that he had been engaged on the case for seven months, which had cost him over £1,000 to the great hindrance of his "private causes", and waste of precious time. The following year he was imprisoned for several months in the Fleet over the same matter. Early in 1586 the dispute came before the House of Lords, where the question of the jointure of the Dowager Marchioness was examined, and Ughtred gave evidence about his executorship. Paulet pursued the matter relentlessly for a number of years, and in 1596, out of malice, persuaded the Privy Council to dismiss Ughtred from the captaincy of Netley Castle on the ground that his long absence in Ireland had caused him to neglect his charge.

== Career ==
Ughtred was a justice of the peace in Hampshire from 1575 until about 1593, sheriff in Hampshire from 1581 to 1582, a member of the council of Munster in 1587 and captain of Netley Castle, Hampshire before 1596.

=== Member of Parliament ===
Ughtred was elected a member of parliament for the seat of Marlborough in 1584, and to the seat of Great Bedwyn in 1589. He owed his parliamentary seats to Seymour influence. His first cousin, Edward Seymour, 1st Earl of Hertford, was lord of Marlborough, and at this time also dominated elections at Great Bedwyn, where Ughtred's co-member in 1589 was another cousin, John Seymour.

On 15 February 1585, Ughtred served on a conference with the Lords concerned ostensibly with fraudulent conveyances but in reality concerned relations between the House of Lords and the House of Commons of England. He was named on 5 March to a Commons committee concerned with the poor law, and on 11 March he was appointed, with his half-brother Thomas Cromwell and Sir William More, to examine a currier accused of making defamatory statements about the House's treatment of a bill concerning tanners. He spoke in the debate on the bill against rogues and vagabonds in this Parliament, maintaining that large sums were being laid out to little purpose on houses of correction. He opposed the return of vagabonds to their own parish, where they had to be supported by the inhabitants of "poor villages and hamlets" who had "already more of their own than they have work for".

In the Parliament of 1589 Ughtred served on the subsidy committee on 11 February, and he spoke on the bill about captains and soldiers as well as serving on the committee on 26 February. The next day he was named to a conference with the Lords on the same lines as that of 15 February 1585. This time the subject was the Queen's dislike of the purveyors bill.

=== Shipowner and shipbuilder ===
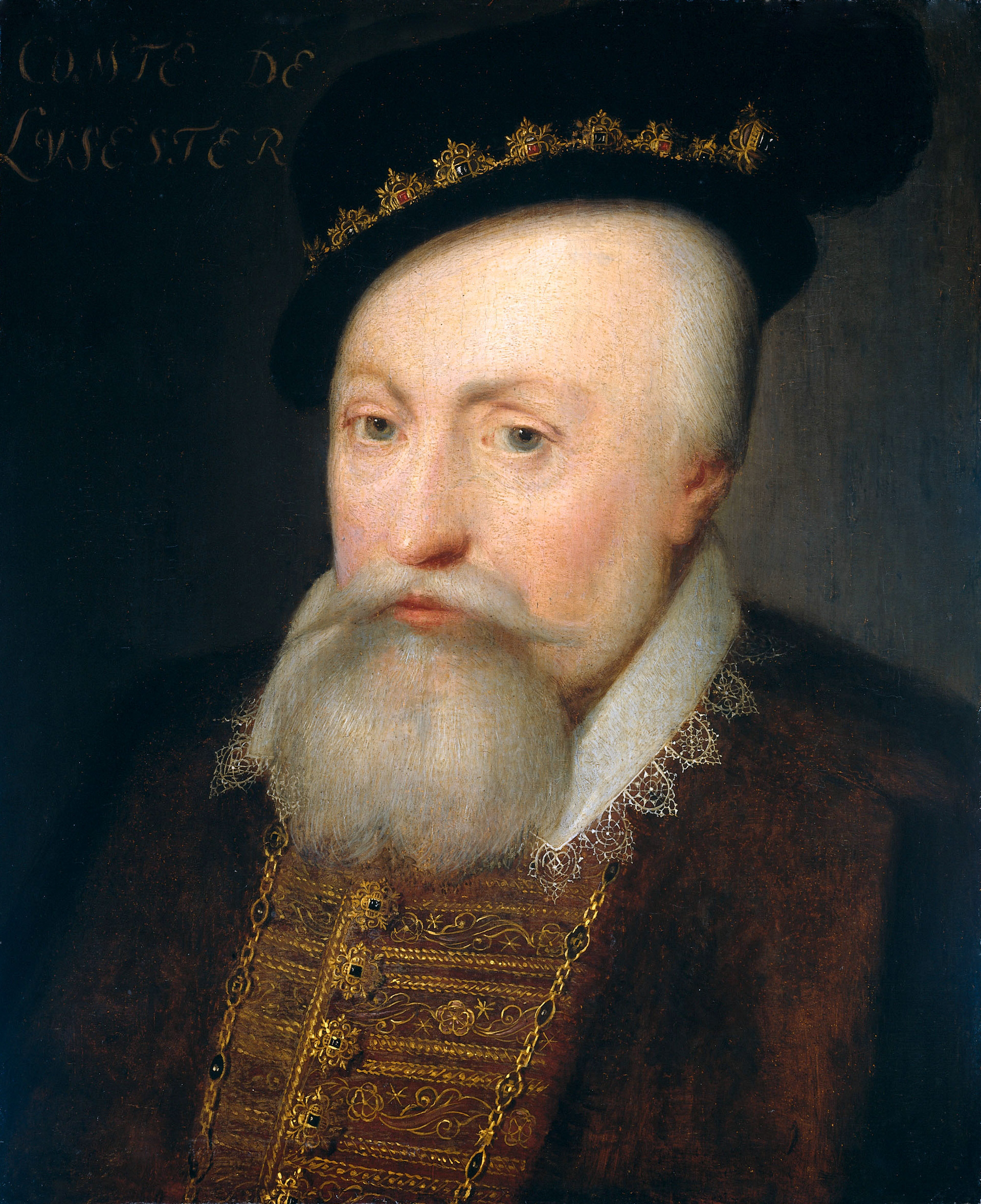
Robert Dudley, Earl of Leicester

As a shipowner, Ughtred knew that sailors who had been paid off after a voyage ran a risk of becoming unemployed and classed as vagabonds. Southampton, where he lived for several years, had experienced this problem in the early 1580s. Ughtred was aware that ships were sometimes left to rot in the harbour because the owners could not pay the cost of repairs. In August 1582, Henry Knollys informed Sir Francis Walsingham that a Breton ship he had brought into Hampton had remained there for four years without being claimed. Knollys had then given her to Ughtred, who had no sooner had her repaired than the former owners demanded her back.

The embargo on sending ships to sea, following Philip II's acquisition of Portugal, would have involved Ughtred in serious loss had he not been allowed, "in consideration of his great charges sustained in building of sundry ships and furnishing of them to the seas", to send out the Galleon (500 tons), the Elizabeth (140 tons) and the Joan (80 tons). A licence he had received to export 500 quarters of wheat to Portugal was cancelled owing to the political situation; however he was permitted to send the same amount to Ireland.

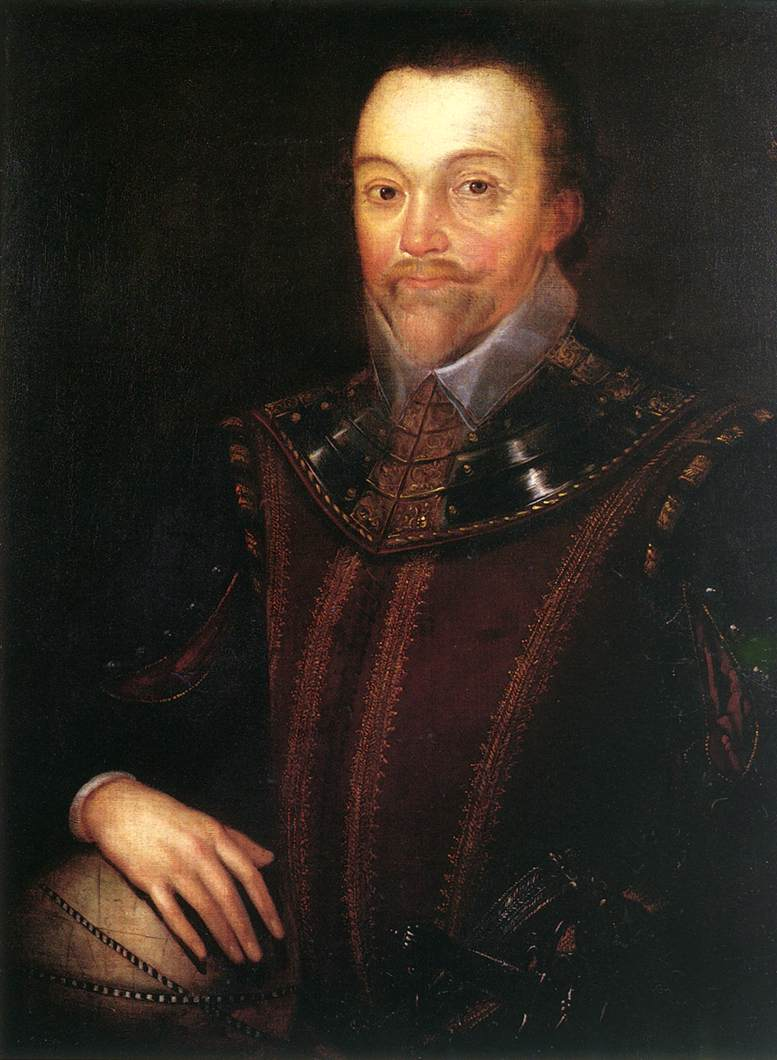
Sir Francis Drake

In 1582 one of his vessels, the Ughtred or Bear, valued at £6,035, acted as flagship to Edward Fenton's unsuccessful voyage, and was renamed the Leicester, presumably in honour of Robert Dudley, 1st Earl of Leicester, the principal shareholder in the adventure. The Leicester sailed with Sir Sir Francis Drake in 1585-6, and was one of his west-country squadron against the Spanish Armada, later possibly taking part in Thomas Cavendish's last voyage. Some of Ughtred's other ships were engaged in voyages to the west. In 1582 he petitioned the Privy Council claiming compensation for losses he had sustained in Spain and the West Indies.

Ughtred was involved in a number of lawsuits as a result of his trading ventures. In November 1582 the Spanish ambassador informed Burghley that "a ship or two" owned by Ughtred had robbed off Newfoundland more than 20 ships belonging to the king of Spain, and that the Admiralty court had awarded one of these, "laden with fish and grease", to Ughtred, his ships having brought her into Bristol. Over a year later Francisco Hernandez of Viana was still attempting to get compensation for this or another attack on Portuguese ships off Newfoundland.

=== Landowner in Ireland ===
Ughtred was one of the many men who were to profit from the Plantations of Ireland, the confiscation of land from rebellious Irish landowners by the English crown, and the colonisation of this land with settlers from England and Wales. Ughtred's investments in Irish lands would also prove to be a further source of litigation.

In 1586 he was granted a licence, with his step-son Sir William Courtenay and others, to "undertake the counties of Connoll and Kerry in one consort". The company was headed by Courtenay, but Ughtred had a considerable stake in it. Unfortunately for the "undertakers", some of the lands in Munster which they were allotted were claimed by Irishmen who were not in rebellion, and the consequent lawsuits were a constant drain on any profits made by the enterprise. In 1591 Ughtred gained a Privy Council decision in his favour over some of the property assigned to him, but two years later it was rescinded, and in 1597 the matter remained unresolved.

The Munster Plantation of the 1580s was the first mass plantation in Ireland. It was instituted as punishment for the Desmond Rebellions, when the Earl of Desmond had rebelled against English interference in Munster. The Desmond dynasty was annihilated in the aftermath of the Second Desmond Rebellion (1579–83) and their estates were confiscated. This gave the English authorities the opportunity to settle the province with colonists from England and Wales, who, it was hoped, would be a bulwark against further rebellions. In 1584, the Surveyor General of Ireland, Sir Valentine Browne and a commission surveyed Munster, to allocate confiscated lands to English Undertakers, wealthy colonists who undertook to import tenants from England to work their new lands. The English undertakers were also supposed to build new towns and provide for the defence of planted districts from attack. In reality the undertakers did not provide the required number of men necessary to defend themselves and their settlers and this would have disastrous consequences during the Irish rebellion of 1598.

During the Munster Plantation (from 1586 onwards), the English settlers were scattered across the province, wherever land had been confiscated. Initially the English undertakers were given detachments of English soldiers to protect them, but these were abolished in the 1590s. As a result, when the Nine Years' War, an Irish rebellion against English rule, came to Munster in 1598, most of the settlers were chased off their lands without any resistance. "The wealthier sort, leaving their castles and dwelling houses" either took refuge in the province's walled towns or fled back to England, and "the meaner sort (the rebellion having overtaken them), were slain, man, woman and child."

== Marriages ==
Ughtred married twice. He married firstly, Elizabeth Paulet (d. 1576), widow of Sir William Courtenay (c. 1529 – 1557) and daughter of his stepfather John Paulet, 2nd Marquess of Winchester by his first wife, Elizabeth Willoughby. He was the stepfather of Sir William Courtenay (d. 1630) and of Jane Courtenay, the first wife of Sir Nicholas Parker. Lady Courtenay died on 4 November 1576 and was buried in St. Mary's Church, Basing, Hampshire.

After Lady Courtenay's death, he appears to have married for a second time. On 5 October 1598, Sir Henry Ughtred and "his lady" left their Irish home and fled to Limerick, fifteen miles away. His “castles of Meane, Pallice and Ballenwylly” were reported to have been abandoned and three days later his castle of Mayne, near Rathkeale, was burnt by Irish rebels.

He had no children by either wife.

== Death ==
Ughtred died in Limerick in June 1599 and by December 1603 his widow had returned to England. Before 1609, Lady Ughtred sold Mayne and Beauly seignories to George Courtenay, fourth son of Sir William Courtenay (d. 1630), who henceforth took name of George Oughtred Courtenay.
