= Nicholas Parker (MP) =

Member of the Parliament of England

The Honourable Sir Nicholas Parker
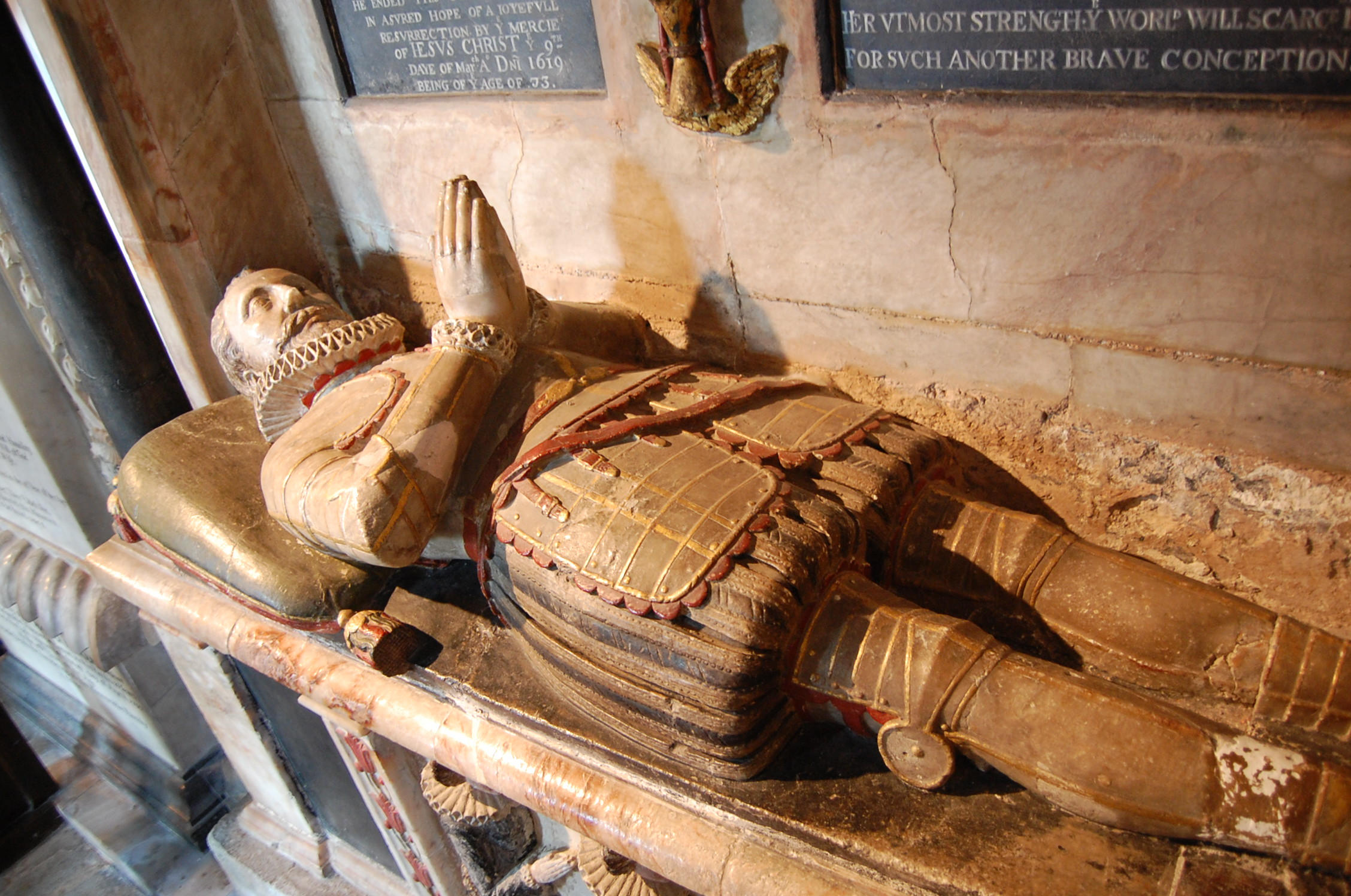
- Monument to Sir Nicholas Parker, Willingdon Church

Member of Parliament for Sussex
- In office 1597–1598

Personal details
- Born: 1547 Ratton, Willingdon
- Died: 9 March 1620 (aged 72–73)
- Resting place: St. Mary the Virgin, Willingdon; 50.799732°N 0.254083°E
- Spouses: Jane Courtenay; Elizabeth Baker; Catherine Temple
- Children: with Catherine: Sir Thomas Parker; John Parker; Robert Parker; Nicholas Parker; Henry Parker; Anne Parker; Mary Parker
- Parents: Thomas Parker; Eleanor Waller

Sir Nicholas Parker (1547 – 9 March 1620), eldest son of Thomas Parker of Ratton and Eleanor, daughter of William Waller of Groombridge, was a military commander during the reign of Elizabeth I. He was Sheriff of Sussex in 1586-87, again in 1593-94, and was elected MP for Sussex in 1597.

Arms of Parker of Ratton

== Career ==
Parker is first mentioned as commanding the soldiers on board Henry Ughtred's galleon Leicester in Edward Fenton's voyage in 1582 and afterwards served in the army in the Low Countries. He was Sheriff of Sussex, in 1586-7 and 1593-4. He became deputy lieutenant of Sussex in 1587 and was knighted by Lord Willoughby in 1588.

Parker was master of the ordnance for Willoughby's forces In France in 1589, and was dispatched to Brittany in 1594. He was elected MP for Sussex in 1597. In 1597 he commanded a company of troops in the islands' voyage under Essex, and in October of that year was appointed to command in Sussex, on threat of invasion.

In 1598, he was appointed deputy lieutenant of Cornwall and governor of Pendennis Castle. In 1602, he was named in the charter of the Virginia Company as one of the adventurers, and another of them, Adrian Moore, married his daughter, Anne.

He was governor of Plymouth from 1601 to 1603, succeeding Sir Ferdinando Gorges.

== Marriages and issue ==
Parker married three times.

- He married firstly, around 20 January 1573, Jane, daughter of Sir William Courtenay (d. 1557) of Powderham and Elizabeth, daughter of John Paulet, 2nd Marquess of Winchester by his first wife, Elizabeth Willoughby; Jane was sister to Sir William Courtenay (d. 1630) and stepdaughter to Henry Ughtred, son of Sir Anthony Ughtred and his second wife, Elizabeth Seymour, sister of Jane, third consort of Henry VIII.
- He married secondly, Elizabeth, daughter of John Baker;

By his first two marriages he had no issue.

- He married thirdly, Catherine, daughter of Sir John Temple of Stowe, Buckinghamshire, by whom he had five sons and two daughters:

- Sir Thomas Parker (1595–1663), married Philadelphia, daughter of Henry Lennard, 12th Baron Dacre.
- John Parker
- Robert Parker
- Nicholas Parker
- Henry Parker (1604–1652), the Civil War pamphleteer.
- Anne Parker, married firstly, Adrian Moore of Odiham, Hampshire and secondly, Sir John Smith.
- Mary Parker

== Death ==
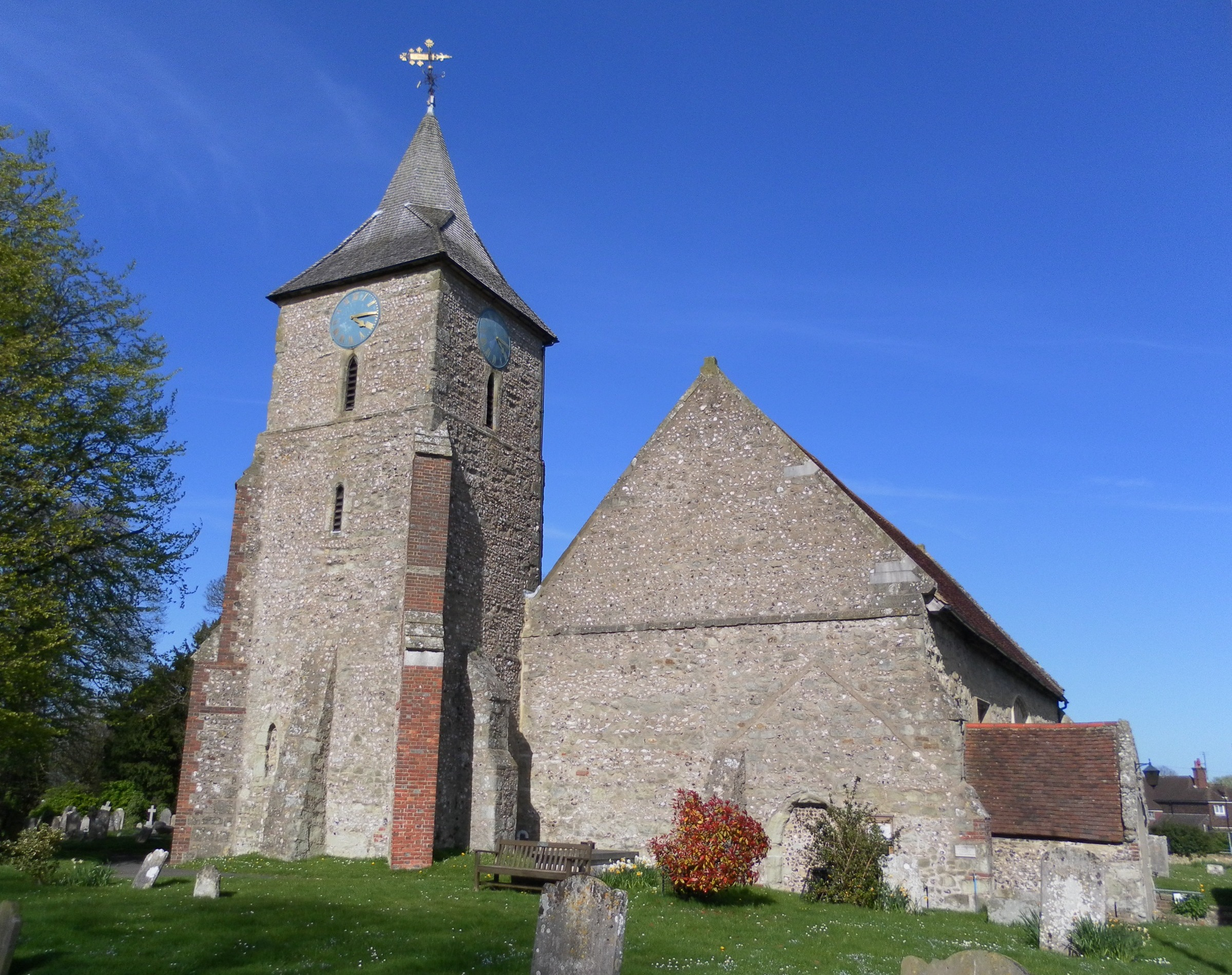
Parish church of St Mary the Virgin, Willingdon, East Sussex

He died 9 March 1620 at the age of 73 and was buried in the family chapel in Willingdon church. Following his death, a monument was erected in the Willingdon parish church, showing an effigy of him and his three wives. It is one of a group of monuments to the Parker family spanning nearly 150 years.

== Sources ==
- Borman, T. (3 January 2008) [First Published 2004]. "Parker, Sir Nicholas". Oxford Dictionary of National Biography (online ed.). Oxford University Press. doi:10.1093/ref:odnb/21328. (Subscription, Wikipedia Library access or UK public library membership required.)
- Burke, John; Burke, John Bernard (1841). A Genealogical and Heraldic History of the Extinct and Dormant Baronetcies of England, Ireland, and Scotland (2nd ed.). London: Printed for Scott, Webster, and Geary.
- Foster, Joseph, ed. (1887). London Marriage Licences, 1521-1869. From Excerpts by the Late Colonel Chester, D.C.L. London: Bernard Quaritch.
- Fuidge, N. M. (1981). "Ughtred, Henry (by 1534-aft. Oct. 1598), of Southampton and Ireland". In Hasler, P. W. (ed.). Members. The History of Parliament: The House of Commons 1558–1603. Archived from the original on 13 January 2021 – via History of Parliament Online.
- Laughton, John Knox (1895). "Parker, Nicholas" . In Lee, Sidney (ed.). Dictionary of National Biography. Vol. 43. London: Smith, Elder & Co. pp. 264–265.
- Llewellyn, Nigel (2014). "East Sussex Church Monuments - 1530 to 1830 - Archive of Photographs: Willingdon, St. Mary the Virgin". Sussex Record Society. sussexrecordsociety.org.
- R.C.G. (1981). "Parker, Sir Nicholas (1547-1620), of Ratton and Willingdon, Suss.". In Hasler, P.W. (ed.). The History of Parliament: The House of Commons 1558–1603 – via History of Parliament Online.
- Shaw, W.A.; Burtchaell, B.D. (1906). The Knights of England: A Complete Record from the Earliest Time to the Present Day of the Knights of All the Orders of Chivalry in England, Scotland, and Ireland, and of Knights Bachelors, Incorporating a Complete List of Knights Bachelors Dubbed in Ireland. Vol. II. London: Sherrat and Hughes.
- Swales, R.J.W. (1982). "Parker, Thomas II (by 1527-80), of Ratton, Willingdon, Suss.". In Bindoff, S.T. (ed.). The History of Parliament: the House of Commons 1509-1558 – via History of Parliament Online.
- Vivian, J. L. (1895). The Visitations of the County of Devon, Comprising the Heralds' Visitations of 1531, 1564, to 1620, with additions by J. L. Vivian. Exeter: H.S. Eland.

Parliament of England
Preceded by Sir Thomas Shirley; Robert Sackville	Member of Parliament for Sussex with Robert Sackville; 1597	Succeeded by Robert Sackville; Charles Howard
