= Anthony Ughtred =

English soldier and military administrator

Sir Anthony Ughtred Knight banneret
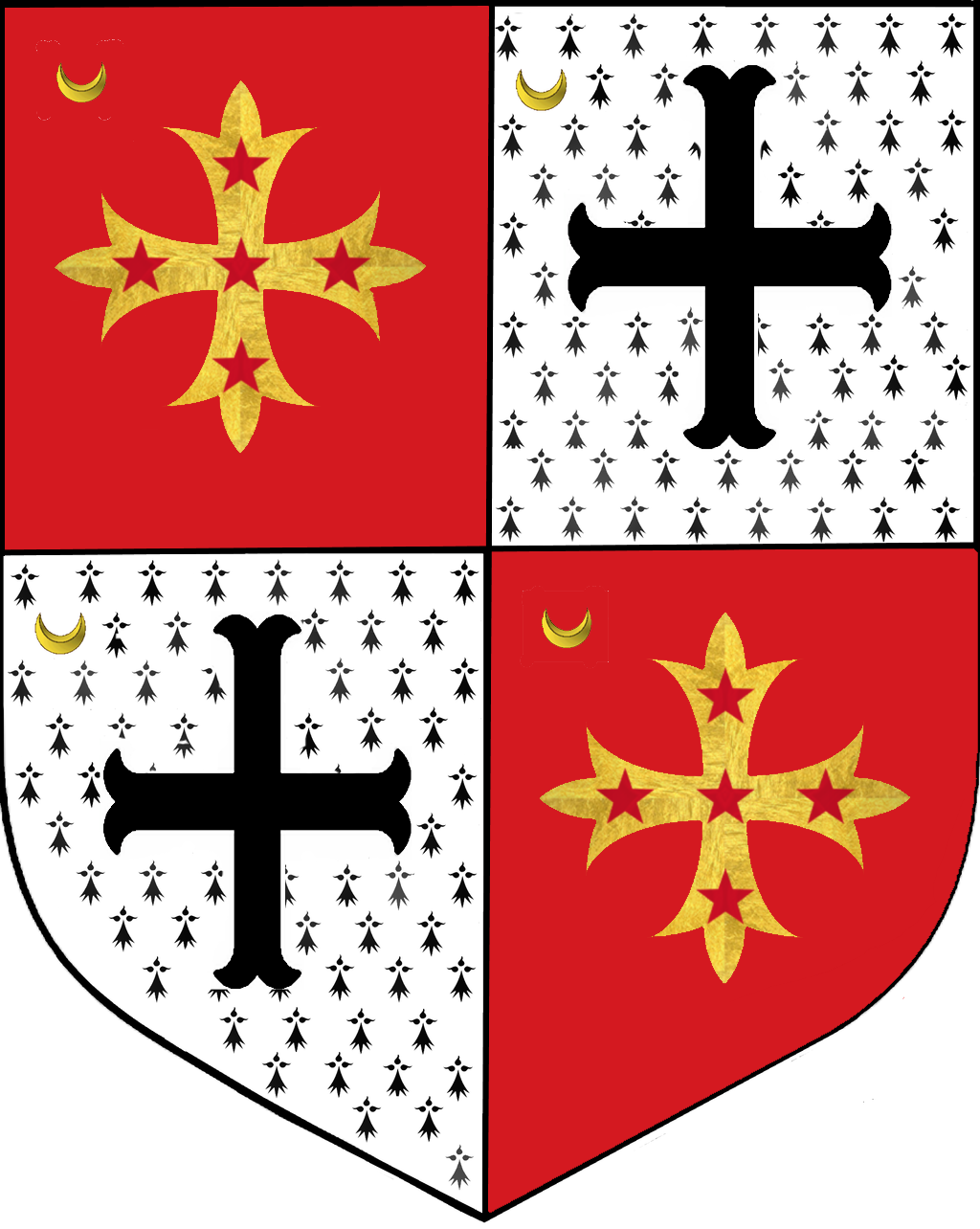
- Coat of Arms of Sir Anthony Ughtred: Quarterly —1 and 4, Gules, on a cross patonce Or 5 five mullets Gules; 2 and 3, Ermine, a cross moline Sable. On each a crescent Or for difference.

Governor of Jersey
- In office August 1532 – 6 October 1534
- Monarch: Henry VIII
- Preceded by: Sir Hugh Vaughan
- Succeeded by: Sir Arthur Darcy

Personal details
- Born: Anthony Ughtred c. 1478 Kexby, Yorkshire
- Died: 6 October 1534 (aged 55–56) Jersey
- Resting place: Chapel of St George, castle of Mont Orgueil; 49.199444°N 2.019167°W
- Spouses: Eleanor (Alianora) (m. 1514); Elizabeth Seymour (m. 1530)
- Children: Sir Henry Ughtred; Margery Ughtred
- Parents: Sir Robert Ughtred; Katherine Eure

Sir Anthony Ughtred or Oughtred, Knight banneret (c. 1478 – 6 October 1534) was an English soldier and military administrator during the reigns of Henry VII and Henry VIII. Ughtred fought in Ireland, the Anglo Scottish border and both on land and at sea in France. He served with distinction as captain of Berwick, marshal of Tournai and governor of Jersey. In 1530, he married Elizabeth Seymour, sister to Jane, future third wife to Henry VIII.

== Family ==
The Ughtred family can be traced back to the early thirteenth century, however, it was Thomas Ughtred (1292 – 1365) who ensured their place as one of the most prominent families in Yorkshire. Following an outstanding military career, Thomas Ughtred was summoned to Parliament as Baron Ughtred from 1343 to 1364 and made a Knight of the Garter between May 1358 and April 1360. On his death in 1365, the barony became extinct as it was not passed on to his descendants. His son and heir, Sir Thomas, despite a distinguished career and a knighthood was never summoned to parliament.

Sir Anthony Ughtred was the third son of Sir Robert Ughtred (c.1428–c.1487) of Kexby, Yorkshire and Katherine, daughter of Sir William Eure of Stokesley, Yorkshire. Sir Robert and his wife had four sons and two daughters:

- Robert Ughtred (c. 1476 – before 24 May 1487)
- Sir Henry Ughtred (1477 – 10 September 1510) was created a Knight of the Bath at the coronation of Henry VIII in 1509. He married Agnes, daughter of Marmaduke Constable, and by her, had at least five children: After her husband's death, Agnes married Sir William Percy, the second son of Henry Percy, 4th Earl of Northumberland.

- Sir Robert Ughtred (1498 –), married Elizabeth, daughter of William Fairfax, of Steeton. He was knighted by the Duke of Suffolk on the River Somme in December 1523.
- Anthony Ughtred
- George Ughtred
- Henry Ughtred
- Eleanor Ughtred, married Thomas Malyverer

- Sir Anthony Ughtred (c. 1478 – 6 October 1534)
- Christopher Ughtred of Buttercrambe, Yorkshire
- Jane Ughtred
- Eleanor Ughtred, married Sir Anthony Browne (c.1450–c.1506). Their daughter, Anne Browne married Charles Brandon, 1st Duke of Suffolk.

The Ughtreds were wealthy landowners. When Sir Robert Ughtred died in 1487, his second son, Sir Henry Ughtred, since the death of his eldest son, Robert, was his heir. After Sir Henry's death in 1510, his eldest son, Robert, still a minor, consequently inherited his father's assets. In 1520 he sold his manors of Skagglethorpe and Redhouse to his uncle, Anthony Ughtred and in May 1524, the newly knighted Sir Robert Ughtred released to his uncle the reversion of the manors of Kylneweke, Tolthorp, Fymour, and Owelesthrop in Yorkshire. They had been leased to Sir Anthony and his brother Christopher "for the life of the longer liver" by their father, the elder Sir Robert Ughtred.

== Career ==
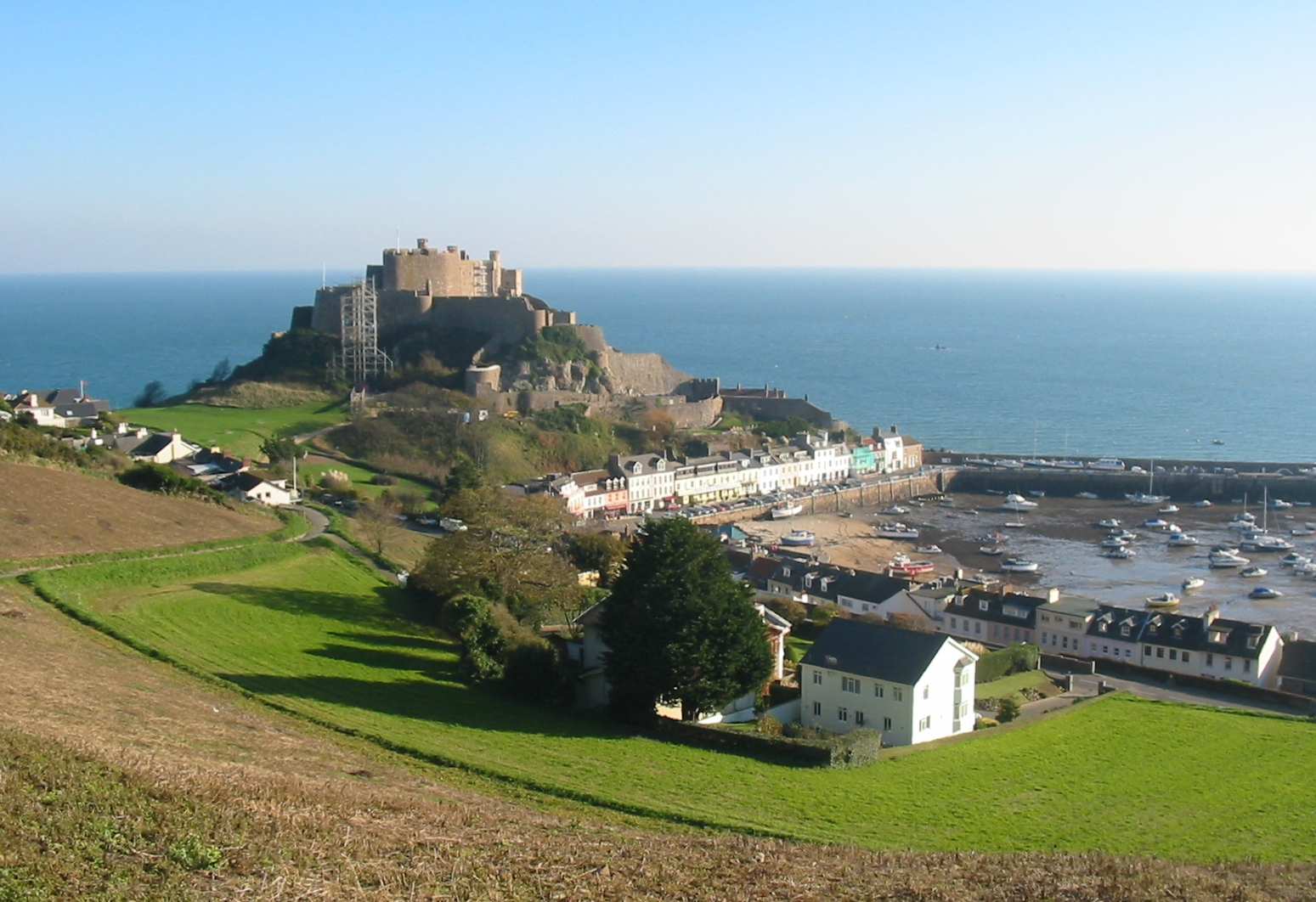
Castle of Mont Orgueil overlooking the harbour of Gorey in the parish of St. Martin, Jersey

Anthony Ughtred participated in Edward Poynings' campaign to subdue Ulster, leading a troop of twenty-seven soldiers in 1496. He was knighted at Eltham in 1512, took part in Edward Howard's naval expedition to Brittany in August 1512 and as captain of the 'Mary James' distinguished himself in the raid on Brest. He accompanied King Henry VIII to France in July 1513 and was appointed marshal of Tournai after the city's fall in September, where he remained until February 1515.

By April 1513, Ughtred was vice-captain and subsequently served as captain of Berwick from February 1515 until August 1532. As the most northerly of England's garrison towns Berwick played a vital role in the defence of the Anglo-Scottish border. In 1522 and 1523 the Duke of Albany's threatened invasions of England both centred on Berwick, and on the former occasion Albany's force, which included twenty-four pieces of artillery, came within 18 miles of the town. Ughtred was responsible for organising Berwick's defences, and was also involved in intelligence gathering and played a key role in the many negotiations that took place between England and Scotland.

The captaincy of Berwick was a challenging and demanding role, however Ughtred was amply rewarded for his military and administrative efforts over the years by a series of royal grants: In February 1514 he became steward of the lordship or manor of Lantyan, and constable of Tintagel Castle, Cornwall and in September of the same year, he was made steward of the Forest of Galtres, Yorkshire and master of the hunt. In 1519 he received a grant in reversion of the offices of steward, constable and gatekeep of the castle and lordship of Bamborough, Northumberland. In 1525, as a knight for the body, he was granted the reversion of the office of governor of Jersey, and of the castle of Mont Orgueil in that island.

Ughtred also pursued mercantile interests and was able to obtain, in 1525, a licence to export wools, woollen cloths, hides, lead, tin, and other English merchandise in a ship of 200 tons 'burthen, once within the next two years, beyond the straits of Marrock (Morocco), without payment of customs, provided they do not exceed 50 marks.' There was a further licence granted in 1527 to export woollen cloths.

In August 1532 he replaced Sir Hugh Vaughan at the castle of Mont Orgueil as captain and governor of Jersey. It has been suggested that when Sir Anthony was granted the reversion of the governorship of Jersey, in 1525, following the treaty of the More, that this was allegedly at the insistence of Anne Boleyn and that this represented the beginning of a more pro-French political influence in a time of peace. Anne Boleyn's influence is very likely in Ughtred's appointment to the governorship, especially since his wife, Elizabeth was present at court as a member of the future queen's household from 1532 to 1533. In 1532, Elizabeth presented the king with 'A fine shirt with a high collar' as a new year's gift.

Peace with France provided the governor of Jersey with the opportunity, in June 1533, to promise Thomas Cromwell, the king's chief minister better wine than any in England and to report that all was quiet on the island. Ughtred's seventeen years as captain of Berwick, his past service in France and his association with the Boleyns ensured that he was well-suited to the governorship of Jersey, a position he held until his death in 1534.

== Marriages and issue ==
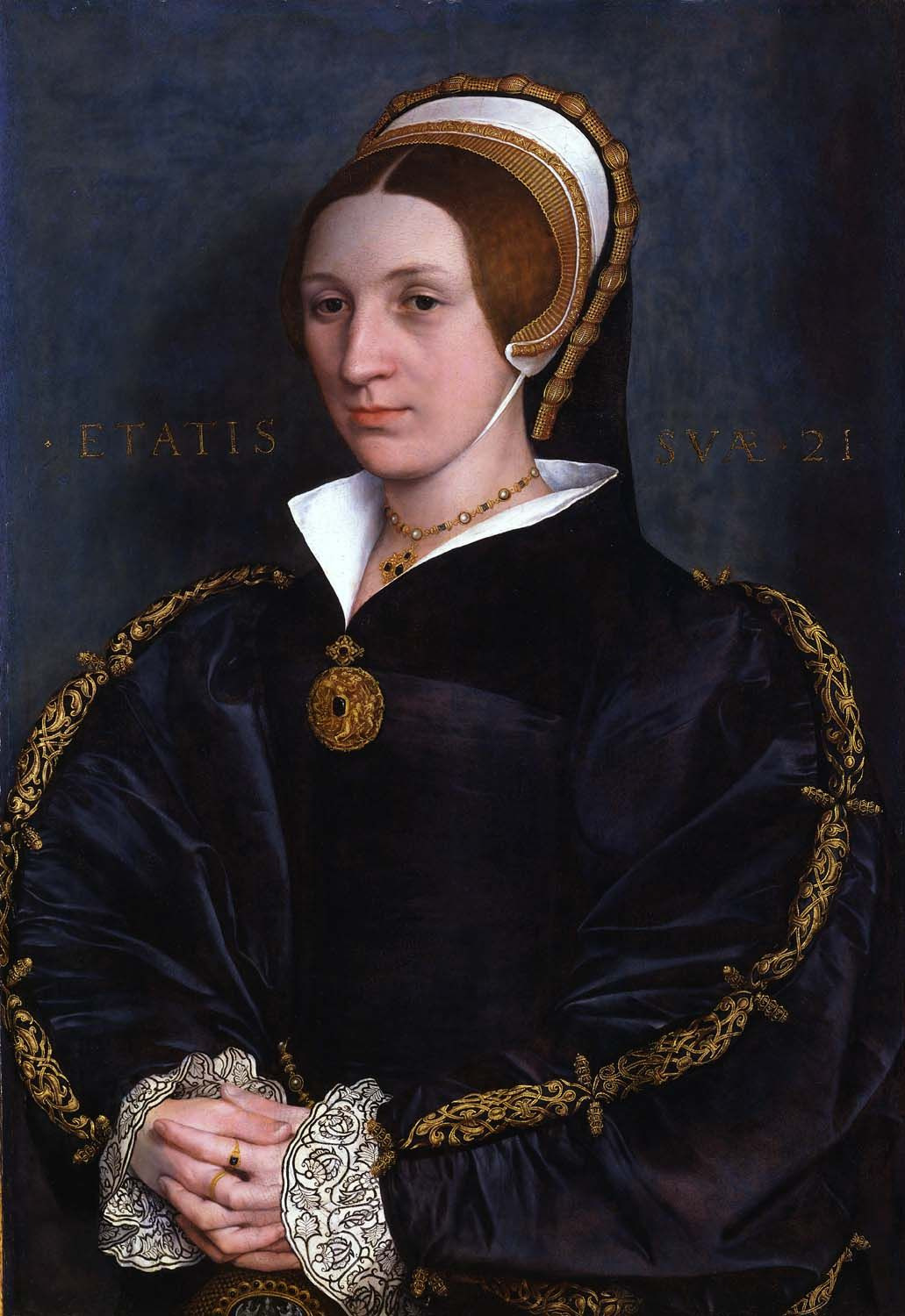
Portrait of a Lady, probably a Member of the Cromwell Family, perhaps Elizabeth Seymour, c. 1535–1540, Hans Holbein the Younger.

Sometime before 1514 Sir Anthony Ughtred married Eleanor (Alianora) about whom nothing is known. By July 1530 he had married Elizabeth Seymour, daughter to Sir John Seymour and Margery Wentworth of Wiltshire. In January 1531, Ughtred and his wife, Elizabeth received the grant in survivorship, of the manors of Lepington and Kexby in Yorkshire. By 1472 Kexby manor was in the possession of Sir Anthony Ughtred's father, Sir Robert Ughtred. After his death, the manor went to his second son, Sir Henry Ughtred. (Sir Robert's eldest son predeceased him.) When Sir Henry died in 1510, Kexby was inherited by his son and heir, Robert, born 1498. In 1524, the recently knighted Sir Robert Ughtred, sold Kexby to John Allen, however, Thomas Wolsey intervened and bought it himself. After Wolsey's attainder in 1530 the king granted the manor for life to Sir Anthony Ughtred and his wife Elizabeth.

The couple had two children:

- Sir Henry Ughtred (c. 1533–1599), born in Jersey, married Elizabeth, daughter to Sir John Paulet, 2nd Marquess of Winchester, widow of Sir William Courtenay. He was elected as a member of parliament for Marlborough in 1584 and Great Bedwyn in 1589, during the reign of Elizabeth I. Sir Henry was knighted by the Lord Deputy of Ireland in 1593.
- Margery Ughtred (born c. 1535), born in Kexby, Yorkshire, probably after her father's death, married William Hungate of Burnby, Yorkshire. They had two sons:

- William Hungate
- Leonard Hungate

== Death ==
Anthony Ughtred died in Jersey on 6 October 1534 and was buried in the chapel of St George, in the castle of Mont Orgueil. He was survived by his wife who, in 1537, married Gregory Cromwell, later Baron Cromwell, the son and heir of Henry VIII's chief minister Thomas Cromwell. After Gregory Cromwell's death in 1551, Elizabeth went on to marry, in 1554, John Paulet, Baron St. John, the eldest son of William Paulet, 1st Marquess of Winchester. She died 19 March 1568 and was buried at Basing, Hampshire.

== Notes ==
Political offices
Preceded by Sir Hugh Vaughan	Governor of Jersey; 1532–1534	Succeeded by Sir Arthur Darcy
