= Desmond Hall and Castle =

- An Halla Mór agus Caisleán Deasmhumhan (Irish)
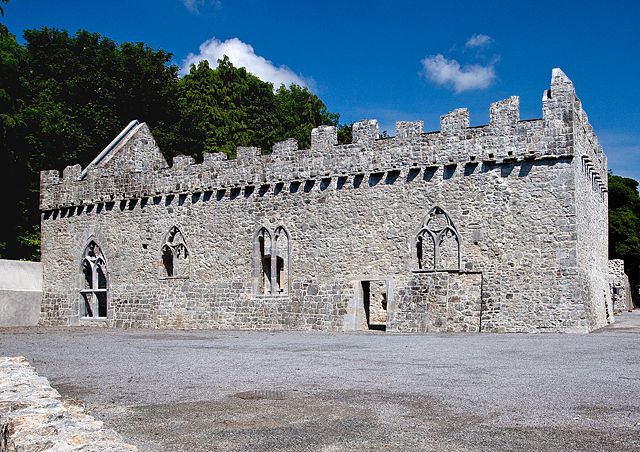
- The Great Hall, with trefoil windows

- Location within Ireland
- 52.450440°N 9.060713°W
- Type: Castle and great hall
- Location: The Square, Newcastle West, County Limerick, Ireland

History
- Built: 15th century

Site notes
- Architectural style: Gothic
- Owner: Office of Public Works

National monument of Ireland
- Official name: Desmond Hall & Great Hall Medieval Castle Complex
- Reference no.: 636 & 582

Desmond Hall and Castle, also called Desmond Castle and Banqueting Hall or Newcastle West Medieval Complex and Desmond Hall, are a set of medieval buildings and National Monuments located in Newcastle West, Ireland. For over 200 years, it belonged to the Fitzgerald family, Earls of Desmond.

== Location ==
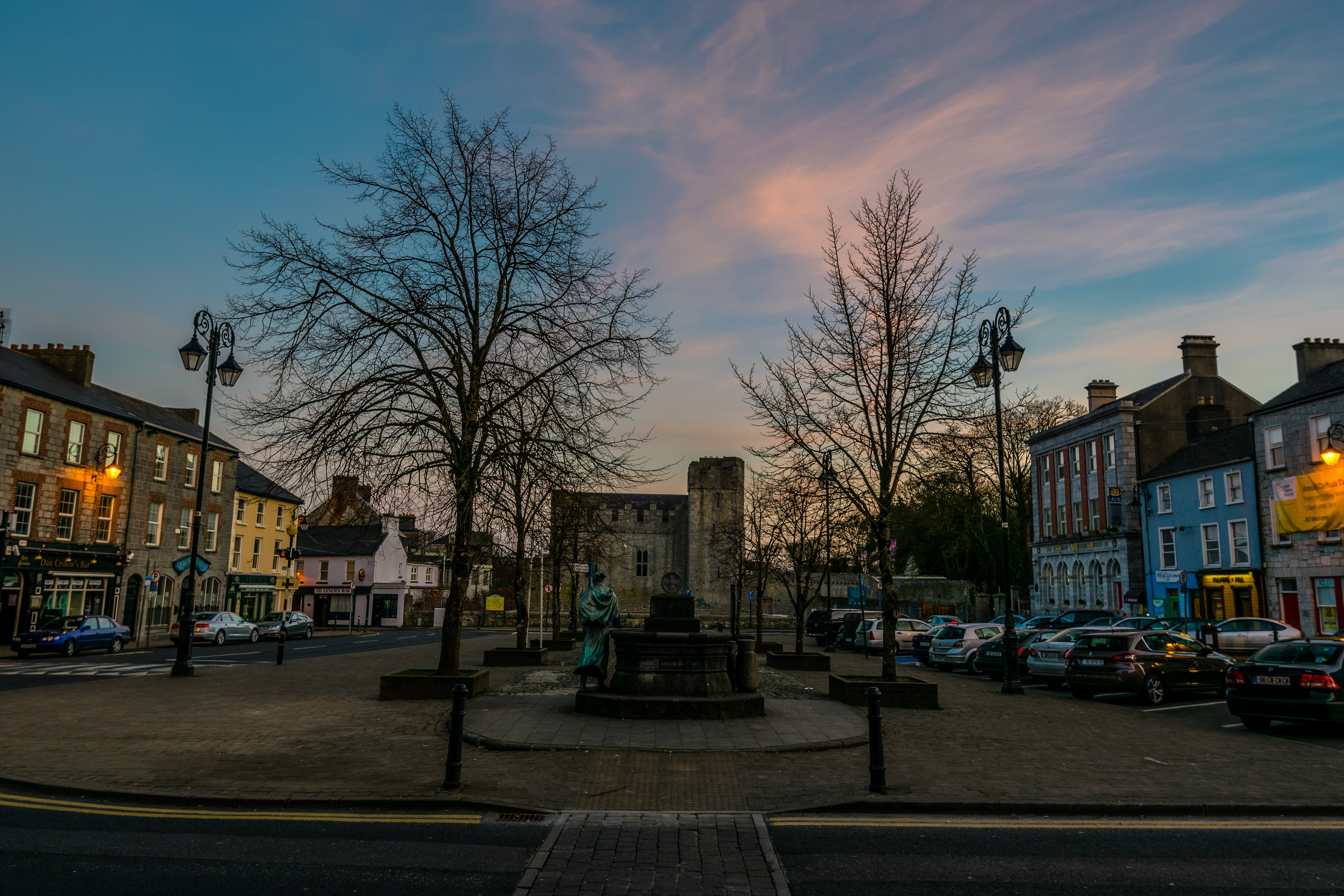
Newcastle West's main square, with Desmond Castle at centre.

Desmond Hall and Castle are located on south of the main square in the western end of Newcastle West.

== History ==
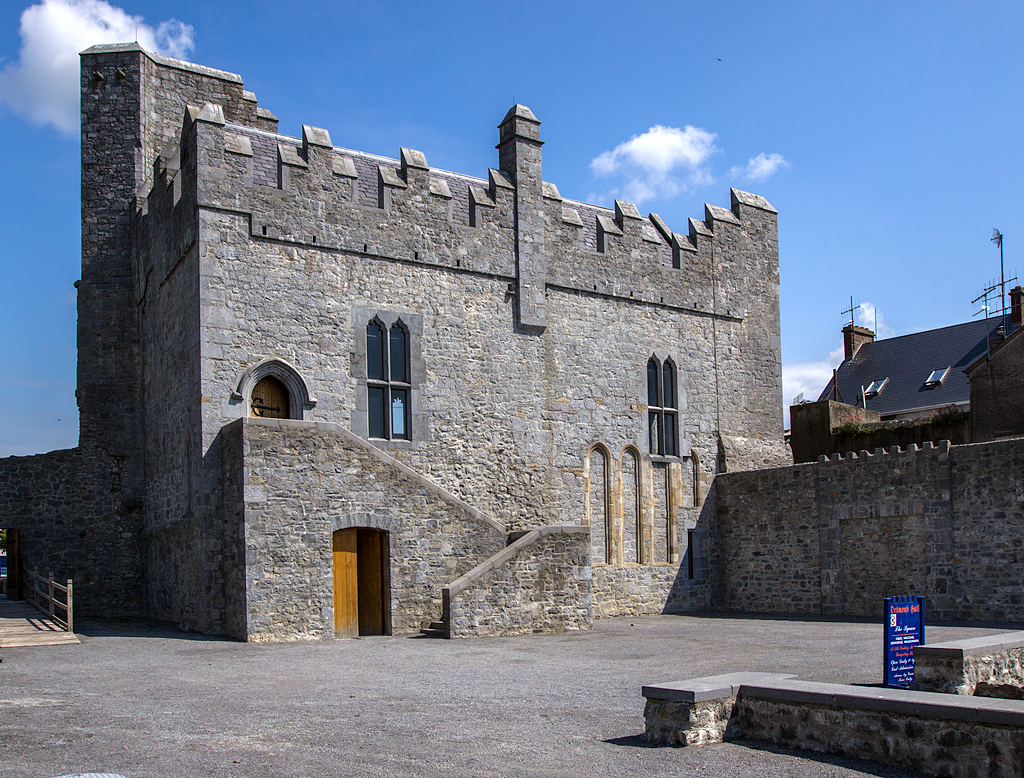
View of Desmond Castle

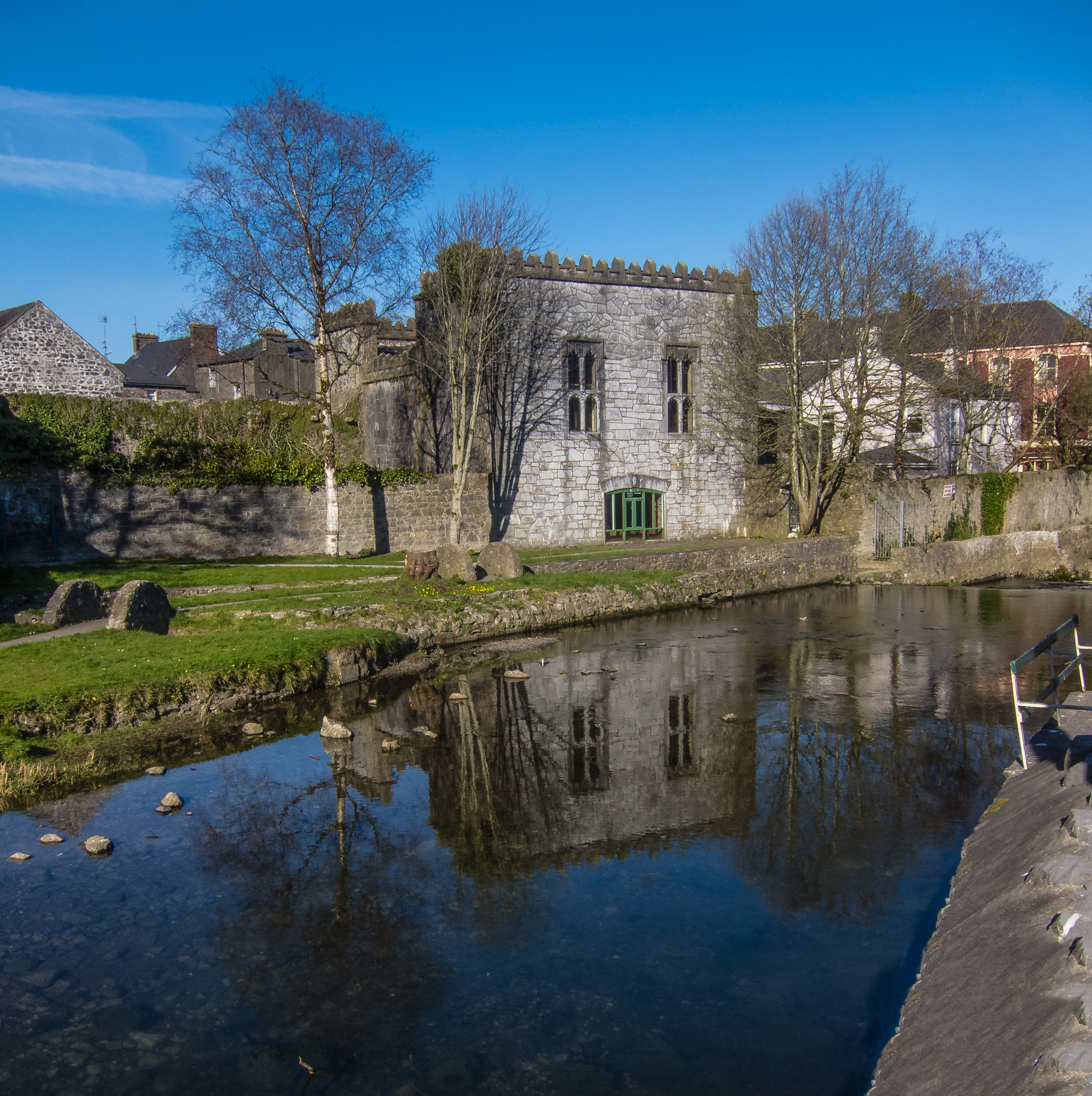
Castle buildings overlooking the River Ara

A castle was built in the 13th century by the FitzGerald Earls of Desmond. Local talks

also connects it with the Knights Templar, perhaps confusing them with their house at Askeaton.

By 1298, the castle had curtain walls and defensive towers surrounding the complex, with thatched houses, cattle byres and fishponds in the centre. Newcastle West was sacked in 1302 and destroyed in 1315. The present structure dates to the 15th century, with the hall and chamber built on the site of the earlier structure, and used for banqueting and entertainment.

In 1591, during the Desmond Rebellions, the castle was seized by the Crown and granted to Sir William Courtenay on condition that 80 English colonists be settled in the area as part of the Munster Plantation. James FitzThomas FitzGerald retook the castle in 1598 but lost it again the next year. It was regranted to Sir William's son Sir George Courtenay, 1st Baronet in 1639.

In 1643, during the Irish Confederate Wars, the castle was besieged for four months, then taken by the Irish Catholic Confederation. They burned it and executed the garrison. The castle buildings were attacked by Oliver Cromwell’s forces in 1645, and further damage during the Williamite war in Ireland in the late 17th century.

In the 17th and 18th century the castle was occupied by the Mahony family, while the Courtenay Earls of Devon lived in Courtenay Castle; much of what had survived of the Desmond Castle was demolished in the 18th century to make room for Courtenay Castle. The banqueting hall was restored in early 19th century, a replacement fireplace being found in Kilmallock. By the 19th century, the Earl of Devon's agent Charles Curling was living in Courtenay Castle, and the Curlings bought Desmond Castle in 1910. It was burned down on 8 August 1922 during the Irish Civil War.

It was owned by the Curlings until the 1940s. Later, it was used as a Masonic hall and as a cinema.

The site was taken into state care in 1989, and renovation began in 1990 under the auspices of the Office of Public Works.

== Castle ==
A spacious medieval hall of two storeys, with a vaulted lower chamber and adjoining tower. Restored medieval features include an oak minstrels' gallery and a limestone hooded fireplace.
