= Hugh Vaughan (governor of Jersey) =

Sir Hugh Vaughan

Governor of Jersey
- In office 1502–1531
- Preceded by: (Captain) Jean Lemprière
- Succeeded by: Anthony Ughtred

Personal details
- Born: Wales
- Died: 28 August 1536 Littleton, Middlesex, England

Sir Hugh Vaughan (died 28 August 1536) was born in Wales as a commoner to unknown parents, who later became Governor of Jersey (or Captain).

== Family ==
His first, or possibly second, wife was Anne Percy the daughter of Henry Percy, 3rd Earl of Northumberland, and the widow of both Sir Thomas Hungerford of Rowden and Sir Lawrence Raynsford. Anne died on 5 July 1522, and sometime after that he married his second, or possibly third, wife who was named Blanche, the daughter of John Castell.

He had at least nine children. One son named Rowland, and three daughters whose mother was probably Anne, and three sons, and four daughters whose mother was Blanche.

== Henry VII of England ==
He formed close ties with King Henry VII while Henry was exiled in Brittany, and was appointed as a Gentleman Usher and Esquire of the Body to the King.

In 1492, Henry VII held a grand tournament at his manor at Richmond. There was some controversy between Vaughan and Sir James Parker over Vaughan's rights to use arms that the Order of the Garter had given him. Vaughan and Parker engaged in combat and Parker was killed at the first course.

After Henry VII's reign Vaughan is said to have gained favour with Cardinal Wolsey who was King Henry VIII's almoner.

== Jersey ==
In 1502, Vaughan was appointed Captain of Jersey along with David Philip. However, after some disagreements between them, it was decided that the role was best carried out by one person and the pair came to an arrangement whereby Vaughan became sole Governor of Jersey until 1531 when he was succeeded by Sir Anthony Ughtred.

In 1513, Thomas Lemprière, the Bailiff of Jersey, and others made complaints to Henry VIII concerning Vaughan's arbitrary behavior in respect of his governance of Jersey. Vaughan's response to this, with some support from the de Carteret family, was an attempt remove Lemprière from the office of Bailiff, despite not having the power to do so, because Lemprière had been appointed by The Crown according to letters patent dated 10 November 1509. Vaughan did eventually succeed in his removal of Lemprière, and Helier de Carteret was appointed by letters patent to the office of Bailiff on 15 December 1521, although he may have been carrying out the role under Vaughan's authority for some years, possibly from 1514.

Vaughan's relationship with Helier soon deteriorated with the Vaughan threatening Helier with his dagger, in court, over the expected outcome of a land ownership dispute. Helier responded by drawing his own dagger, and threatening to kill Vaughan and his men if they made a move. In the aftermath of this incident, Vaughan attempted to remove Helier from office as Bailiff. The issue was raised with the lords of his Majesty's Council, but was not resolved for around twelve years, the final result being that Helier's actions were approved by the Star Chamber, and Vaughan was ordered to pay costs.

During that twelve-year period of delay, Vaughan had illegally appointed several different people as Bailiff, and Helier had not carried out any official duties even though he was the only person appointed as Bailiff by The Crown.

== Death and burial ==
Vaughan died on 28 August 1536, and was in the chapel of St Michael in Westminster Abbey. His widow Blanche died on 8 December 1553, and was buried at the church of St Mary Magdalene in Littleton, in Middlesex (now Surrey).

== See also ==
- Governors or "Captains" of Jersey
