= Elizabeth Paulet =

English noblewoman

- Born: c. 1533; England
- Died: 4 November 1576 (aged 42–43); Winchester, England
- Buried: St. Mary's Church, Basing, Hampshire; 51.271389°N 1.046667°W
- Noble family: Paulet
- Spouses: Sir William Courtenay (m. 1545; died 1557) Sir Henry Ughtred
- Issue: Sir William Courtenay; Jane Courtenay
- Father: John Paulet, 2nd Marquess of Winchester
- Mother: Elizabeth Willoughby

Elizabeth Paulet (c. 1533 – 4 November 1576) was an English noblewoman, the daughter of John Paulet, 2nd Marquess of Winchester of Basing, Hampshire and his first wife Elizabeth Willoughby.

== Marriages and issue ==
Elizabeth Paulet married twice.

=== First marriage ===
She married firstly, around 28 November 1545, Sir William Courtenay, de jure Earl of Devon (c. 1529 – 26 September 1557), the son of George Courtenay, of Powderham, Devon and Catherine St. Leger and had a son and a daughter:

- Sir William Courtenay, (June 1553 – 24 June 1630), married firstly, around 18 January 1573, Elizabeth, daughter of Henry Manners, 2nd Earl of Rutland; secondly, Elizabeth, daughter of Sir George Sydenham of Combe Sydenham in Somerset and widow of Sir Francis Drake; thirdly, Jane, daughter of Robert Hill of Yarde, Somerset.
- Jane Courtenay, married, around 20 January 1573, as his first wife, Sir Nicholas Parker of Willingdon.

Sir William Courtenay died 29 September 1557 after the battle of St. Quentin in Picardy. His son and heir, William, was four years old. He bequeathed to his wife the life interest of a third of his property in Devon and to his daughter an annuity of £20 until she was 21, when she was to receive £1,000.

=== Second marriage ===
She married secondly, after 1557, Sir Henry Ughtred (c. 1533–1599), the son of Sir Anthony Ughtred, Governor of Jersey and Elizabeth Seymour, daughter of Sir John Seymour of Wulfhall, Savernake, Wiltshire and Margery Wentworth.

== Death ==
Elizabeth died 4 November 1576 and was buried at St. Mary's Church, Basing, Hampshire. Henry Ughtred remarried after his wife's death, however the identity of his second wife is unknown. He died in Limerick in June 1599.

== Bibliography ==
- "Elizabeth I: volume 202 Part 3: October 1598". Calendar of State Papers, Ireland, 1598-1599. British-history.ac.uk. 1895. pp. 273–326. (subscription required)
- Colby, Frederic Thomas, ed. (1872). "The Visitation of the County of Devon in the Year 1620". The Publications of the Harleian Society. VI. London: Harleian Society.
- Cokayne, G.E. (1916). Gibbs, Vicary (ed.). The Complete Peerage of England, Scotland, Ireland, Great Britain and the United Kingdom, Extant, Extinct or Dormant. Vol. IV (revised ed.). London: St Catherine Press.
- Foster, Joseph, ed. (1887). London Marriage Licences, 1521-1869. From Excerpts by the Late Colonel Chester, D.C.L. London: Bernard Quaritch.
- Fuidge, N. M. (1981). "Ughtred, Henry (by 1534-aft. Oct. 1598), of Southampton and Ireland". In Hasler, P.W. (ed.). Members. The History of Parliament: The House of Commons 1558–1603. Historyofparliamentonline.org.
- Hasler, P.W. (1981). "Courtenay, Sir William I (1553-1630), of Powderham, Devon". In Hasler, P.W. (ed.). Members. The History of Parliament: The House of Commons 1558–1603. Historyofparliamentonline.org.
- Hawkyard, A.D.K. (1982). "Courtenay, Sir William II (1529/30-57), of Powderham, Devon and London". In Bindoff, S.T. (ed.). Members. The History of Parliament: the House of Commons 1509-1558. Historyofparliamentonline.org.
- MacCarthy-Morrogh, Michael (2016) [July 1983]. The Munster Plantation, 1583-1641 (PDF) (PhD). Ann Arbor. 10097527.
- Nunan, Joe (2012). "The Planting of Munster, 1580-1640" (PDF). Public Outreach Series. Jpnunan.com. Archived from the original (PDF) on 26 September 2013.
- R.C.G. (1981). "Parker, Sir Nicholas (1547-1620), of Ratton and Willingdon, Suss.". In Hasler, P.W. (ed.). Members. The History of Parliament: The House of Commons 1558–1603. Historyofparliamentonline.org.
- Richardson, Douglas (2011). Everingham, Kimball G. (ed.). Magna Carta Ancestry: A Study in Colonial and Medieval Families. Vol. III (2nd ed.). p. 311.
- Thornton, Tim (2012). The Channel Islands, 1370–1640: Between England and Normandy. Woodbridge: The Boydell Press. ISBN 978-1-84383-711-4.
- Vivian, J.L. (1895). The Visitations of the County of Devon, Comprising the Heralds' Visitations of 1531, 1564, to 1620, with additions by J. L. Vivian. Exeter: H.S. Eland.
