= Lantyan =

Village in Cornwall, England

Coordinates: 50.38554°N 4.66722°W

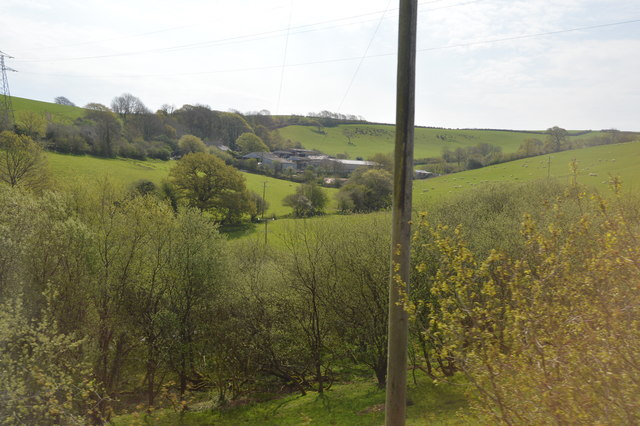
Lantyan

Lantyan is a settlement in Cornwall, United Kingdom. It is situated on the west side of the River Fowey just over a mile (1.6 km) south of Lostwithiel.

Lantyan Wood is in the care of the Woodland Trust. It is south of the settlement and covers the steep-sided Fowey valley with a network of tracks to give access. The Saints' Way long-distance footpath passes nearby.
