= William Paulet, 3rd Marquess of Winchester =

English nobleman (c. 1532 – 1598)

The Most Honourable The Marquess of Winchester KB JP
- Arms of Paulet, Marquess of Winchester: Sable, three swords pilewise points in base proper pomels and hilts or

Lord High Steward for the funeral of Mary, Queen of Scots
- In office 31 August 1587 – 1 September 1587
- Monarch: Elizabeth I
- Chancellor: Sir Christopher Hatton
- Preceded by: The Earl of Shrewsbury for the trial of the Duke of Norfolk
- Succeeded by: The Earl of Derby for the trial of the Earl of Arundel and Surrey

Lord Lieutenant of Dorset
- In office 1580–?
- Monarch: Elizabeth I
- Chancellor: Sir Thomas Bromley
- Preceded by: The Lord Mountjoy
- Succeeded by: The Earl of Bedford
- In office 1 March 1586 – 24 November 1598
- Monarch: Elizabeth I
- Chancellor: See: Sir Thomas Bromley (until 1587); Sir Christopher Hatton (1587–1591); Lord Commissioners of the Great Seal: (1591–1592); The Lord Burghley; The Lord Hunsdon; The Lord Cobham; The Lord Buckhurst; Sir Gilbert Gerard; Sir John Puckering (1592–1596) (as Lord Keeper); The Viscount Ellesmere (from 1596)
- Preceded by: The Earl of Bedford
- Succeeded by: The Viscount Howard of Bindon

Lord Lieutenant of Hampshire
- In office before 1585 – 24 November 1598 Serving with The Earl of Sussex (3 July 1585 – 14 December 1593); The Lord Mountjoy (from 4 August 1595); The Lord Hunsdon (from 8 September 1603)
- Monarch: Elizabeth I
- Chancellor: See: Sir Thomas Bromley (until 1587); Sir Christopher Hatton (1587–1591); Lord Commissioners of the Great Seal: (1591–1592); The Lord Burghley; The Lord Hunsdon; The Lord Cobham; The Lord Buckhurst; Sir Gilbert Gerard; Sir John Puckering (1592–1596) (as Lord Keeper); The Viscount Ellesmere (from 1596)
- Preceded by: Unknown
- Succeeded by: The Lord Mountjoy; The Lord Hunsdon

High Sheriff of Hampshire
- In office 1560–1561
- Monarch: Elizabeth I
- Chancellor: Sir Nicholas Bacon
- Preceded by: Thomas Pace
- Succeeded by: William Uvedale

Member of Parliament for Dorset
- In office 1571–1571 Serving with John Horsey
- Monarch: Elizabeth I
- Chancellor: Sir Nicholas Bacon
- Preceded by: Thomas Howard
- Succeeded by: John Stroke
- Constituency: Dorset

Personal details
- Born: William Paulet c. 1532
- Died: 24 November 1598 (aged 65–66)
- Resting place: St. Mary's Church, Basing, Hampshire; 51.271389°N 1.046667°W
- Spouse: Anne Howard
- Domestic partner: Jane Lambert (mistress)
- Children: With Anne Howard: William Paulet, 4th Marquess of Winchester; Lady Anne Dennis; Lady Katherine Wroughton; Lady Elizabeth Hoby; With Jane Lambert: Sir William Paulet; Sir John Paulet; Sir Hercules Paulet; Hector Paulet; Susannah Warnfford
- Parent(s): John Paulet, 2nd Marquess of Winchester (father); Elizabeth Willougby (mother)
- 3rd Marquess of Winchester
- Tenure: 1576–1598
- Predecessor: John Paulet, 2nd Marquess of Winchester
- Successor: William Paulet, 4th Marquess of Winchester
- Other titles: 3rd Earl of Wiltshire; 3rd Baron St John

William Paulet, 3rd Marquess of Winchester KB JP (c. 1532 – 24 November 1598) was an English nobleman, the son of John Paulet, 2nd Marquess of Winchester and his first wife, Elizabeth Willoughby. His maternal grandfather was Robert Willoughby, 2nd Baron Willoughby de Broke.

He was made a Knight of the Bath at the coronation of Mary I on 30 November 1553.

== Career ==
The offices he held during his career included:

- Justice of the Peace, Hampshire from c.1559
- Sheriff of Hampshire 1560–61
- Justice of the Peace, Dorset from 1564
- Commissioner for the Musters, Dorset 1569
- High Steward, Dorchester by 1570
- Joint Lord Lieutenant of Dorset 1569 and 1585/6-98
- Member of Parliament for Dorset 1571
- Joint Lord Lieutenant of Hampshire 1585–98: During the Spanish Armada crisis in 1588 he commanded 4747 men of the Hampshire Trained Bands ready to defend Portsmouth
- Lord High Steward for the funeral of Mary, Queen of Scots, 1 August 1587
- Commissioner for Ecclesiastical Causes, Diocese of Winchester 1597

Paulet was summoned to Parliament on 5 May 1572 in his father's Barony of St John. He succeeded his father as 3rd Marquess of Winchester on 4 November 1576. During October 1586, he was one of the judges at the trial of Mary, Queen of Scots, later acting as Lord High Steward at her funeral on 1 August 1587.

He is known as the author of The Lord Marquess Idleness, a remarkable and most ingenious acrostic of six Latin verses. It was published in 1586 and 1587.

== Marriage and issue ==
Between 20 June 1544 and 10 February 1547/1548 he married Anne or Agnes Howard, daughter of William Howard, 1st Baron Howard of Effingham and his first wife, Katherine Broughton and had issue:

- William Paulet, 4th Marquess of Winchester, died 4 February 1629, married Lucy Cecil, daughter of Thomas Cecil, 1st Earl of Exeter
- Anne Paulet, born 1552, married Sir Thomas Denys (modern spelling: Dennis), of Holcombe Burnell, Devon; grandparents of the prodigy Denys Rolle
- Katherine Paulet, married Sir Giles Wroughton
- Elizabeth Paulet, married Sir Edward Hoby

The marriage was not a happy one, and the couple were only reconciled, on one occasion, by Elizabeth I's intervention.

Paulet also had children with his recognised mistress Jane Lambert, who later married the much younger Sir Gerrard Fleetwood:

- Sir William Paulet, died 1628, lawyer, London, later of Edington, Wiltshire. High Sheriff of Wiltshire 1613, married Elizabeth, daughter of Sir John Seymour
- Sir John Paulet, lawyer, Winchester, married Elizabeth, daughter of John Stump
- Sir Hercules Paulet, born 1574, married Bridgett, daughter of Sir Henry Gifford
- Hector Paulet, born 1578, married Joan Butler
- Susan or Susanna Paulet, married firstly Thomas Kirkby and secondly Launcelott Warnfford

== Death ==
He died on 24 November 1598 and was buried at Basing, Hampshire. His widow, Anne Paulet, died on 18 November 1601. The date of Jane Lambert's death is not recorded.

== Bibliography ==
- Cokayne, G. E. (1898). Complete Peerage of England, Scotland, Ireland, Great Britain and the United Kingdom, Extant, Extinct or Dormant. Vol. VIII. Exeter: William Pollard.
- Emerson, Kathy Lynn. "Jane Lambert". A Who’s Who of Tudor Women. Kateemersonhistoricals.com. Archived from the original on 2013-09-21.
- Hasler, P. W. (1981). "Paulet, Sir William (c.1532–98), of Hooke Court, Dorset". In Hasler, P. W. (ed.). The History of Parliament: The House of Commons 1558–1603. Histparl.ac.uk.
- Colonel George Jackson Hay (1905). An Epitomized History of the Militia (The Constitutional Force). London: United Service Gazette Offices. Republished by Ray Westlake, Military Books, 1987, ISBN 978-0-9508530-7-9 and by Naval & Military Press, 2015, ISBN 978-1-78331-171-2
- McDermott, James (2008). "Howard, William, first Baron Howard of Effingham (c.1510–1573)". Oxford Dictionary of National Biography (online ed.). Oxford University Press. doi:10.1093/ref:odnb/13946. (Subscription, Wikipedia Library access or UK public library membership required.)
- Mosley, Charles, ed. (2003). Burke's Peerage, Baronetage and Knightage. Vol. 1 (107th ed.). Wilmington: Burke's Peerage & Gentry LLC. ISBN 0971196621.
- Richardson, Douglas (2011). Everingham, Kimball G. (ed.). Magna Carta Ancestry: A Study in Colonial and Medieval Families. Vol. III (2nd ed.). CreateSpace. p. 312. ISBN 978-1461045205.
- Rylands, W. Harry, ed. (1913). "Pedigrees from the visitation of Hampshire made by Thomas Benolt, Clarenceulx a 1530 : enlarged with the vissitation of the same county made by Robert Cooke, Clarenceulx anno 1575 both which are continued with the vissitation made by John Phillipott, Somersett (for William Camden, Clarenceux) in a 1622 most part then don & finished in a 1634. As collected by Richard Mundy in Harleian ms. no. 1544". The Publications of the Harleian Society. LXIV. London: Harleian Society: 224.
- Shaw, W. A. (1906). The Knights of England. Vol. I. London: Sherrat and Hughes. p. 153.
- Thomas, Sidney (October 1948). ""The Lord Marquess' Idleness": The First English Book of Essays". Studies in Philology. 45 (4). University of North Carolina Press: 592–599. JSTOR 4172865.
- "Winchester, Marquess of (E, 1551)". Cracroft's Peerage. Archived from the original on 2013-11-13.
- "William Paulet, Marquess of Winchester". Family Search: Community Trees. The Church of Jesus Christ of Latter-day Saints. Archived from the original on 2013-10-23.
- "William Paulet, 3rd Marquess of Winchester". Family Search: Community Trees. The Church of Jesus Christ of Latter-day Saints. Archived from the original on 2013-12-20.

Political offices
Unknown	Lord Lieutenant of Hampshire jointly with The Earl of Sussex 1585–1593; The Lord Mountjoy 1595–1598; The Lord Hunsdon 1597–1598; 1585–1598	Succeeded by The Lord Mountjoy; The Lord Hunsdon
Preceded by The Earl of Bedford	Lord Lieutenant of Dorset; 1586–1598	Vacant Title next held by The Viscount Howard of Bindon
Peerage of England
Preceded by John Paulet	Marquess of Winchester; 1576–1598	Succeeded by William Paulet
Preceded by John Paulet	Baron St John of Basing (writ in acceleration); 1572–1598	Succeeded by William Paulet
