= Courtenay baronets =

Baronetcy in the Baronetage of England

There have been two baronetcies created for members of the Courtenay family, one in the Baronetage of Ireland and one in the Baronetage of England. One creation is extant as of 2008.

The Courtenay Baronetcy, of Newcastle in the County of Limerick, was created in the Baronetage of Ireland on 20 December 1621 for George Courtenay. The title is believed to have become extinct on the death of the fourth Baronet circa 1700. However, some sources claim that the baronetcy became extinct or dormant on the death of the second Baronet in 1644.

The Courtenay Baronetcy was created in the Baronetage of England in February 1644 for William VI Courtenay (1628–1702) de jure 5th Earl of Devon, of Powderham, Devon, son and heir of Francis Courtenay (1576–1638), de jure 4th Earl of Devon. Francis was the brother of the first Baronet of the 1621 creation. For more information on this creation, see the Earl of Devon.

== Courtenay baronets, of Newcastle (1621) ==
- Sir George Courtenay, 1st Baronet (c. 1583-1644)
- Sir William Courtenay, 2nd Baronet (1616–1652)
- Sir Francis Courtenay, 3rd Baronet (1617–1660)
- Sir William Courtenay, 4th Baronet (c. 1659 – c. 1700)

== Courtenay baronets (1644) ==
- see the Earl of Devon
