= William Courtenay (died 1557) =

Member of the Parliament of England

William Courtenay Kt.
- Arms of Courtenay, Earls of Devon: Quarterly 1st & 4th, Or, three torteaux gules (Courtenay); 2nd & 3rd: Or, a lion rampant azure
- Born: c. 1529
- Died: 29 September 1557 (aged 27–28)
- Occupations: MP, soldier
- Spouse: Lady Elizabeth Paulet
- Children: Sir William Courtenay; Jane Courtenay
- Parent(s): George Courtenay; Catherine St Leger

Sir William Courtenay (c. 1529 – 29 September 1557) was a landowner in Devon and de jure 2nd Earl of Devon. He was the son of George Courtenay (d. 1533) and Catherine, daughter of Sir George St Ledger of Annery. He succeeded his grandfather Sir William Courtenay, of Powderham in 1535. He was knighted in 1553 and MP for Plympton in 1555.

== Marriage and issue ==
Around 28 November 1545, he married Lady Elizabeth (c. 1533 – 4 Nov. 1576), daughter to John Paulet, 2nd Marquess of Winchester and his first wife, Elizabeth Willoughby, by whom he had a son and a daughter:

- Sir William Courtenay (1553 – 24 June 1630), married firstly, around 18 January 1573, Lady Elizabeth, daughter of Henry Manners, 2nd Earl of Rutland; secondly, Elizabeth, daughter of Sir George Sydenham of Combe Sydenham in Somerset and widow of Sir Francis Drake; thirdly, Jane, daughter of Robert Hill of Yarde, Somerset.
- Jane Courtenay, married, around 20 January 1573, as his first wife, Sir Nicholas Parker of Willingdon.

== Death ==
He took part in the battle of St. Quentin in August 1557 in Picardy, France, and died on 29 September 1557. His widow later married Sir Henry Ughtred, son of Sir Anthony Ughtred and his second wife, Elizabeth Seymour, sister of Jane, third consort of Henry VIII.

In 1831, a decision of the House of Lords determined that he had succeeded his sixth cousin once removed (Edward Courtenay, 1st Earl of Devon) as de jure 2nd Earl of Devon in 1556.

== Notes ==
Peerage of England
Preceded by Edward Courtenay	Earl of Devon de jure 1556 – 1557	Succeeded by William Courtenay
