= Old Basing =

Village in Hampshire, England

Coordinates: 51.2704°N 1.0473°W

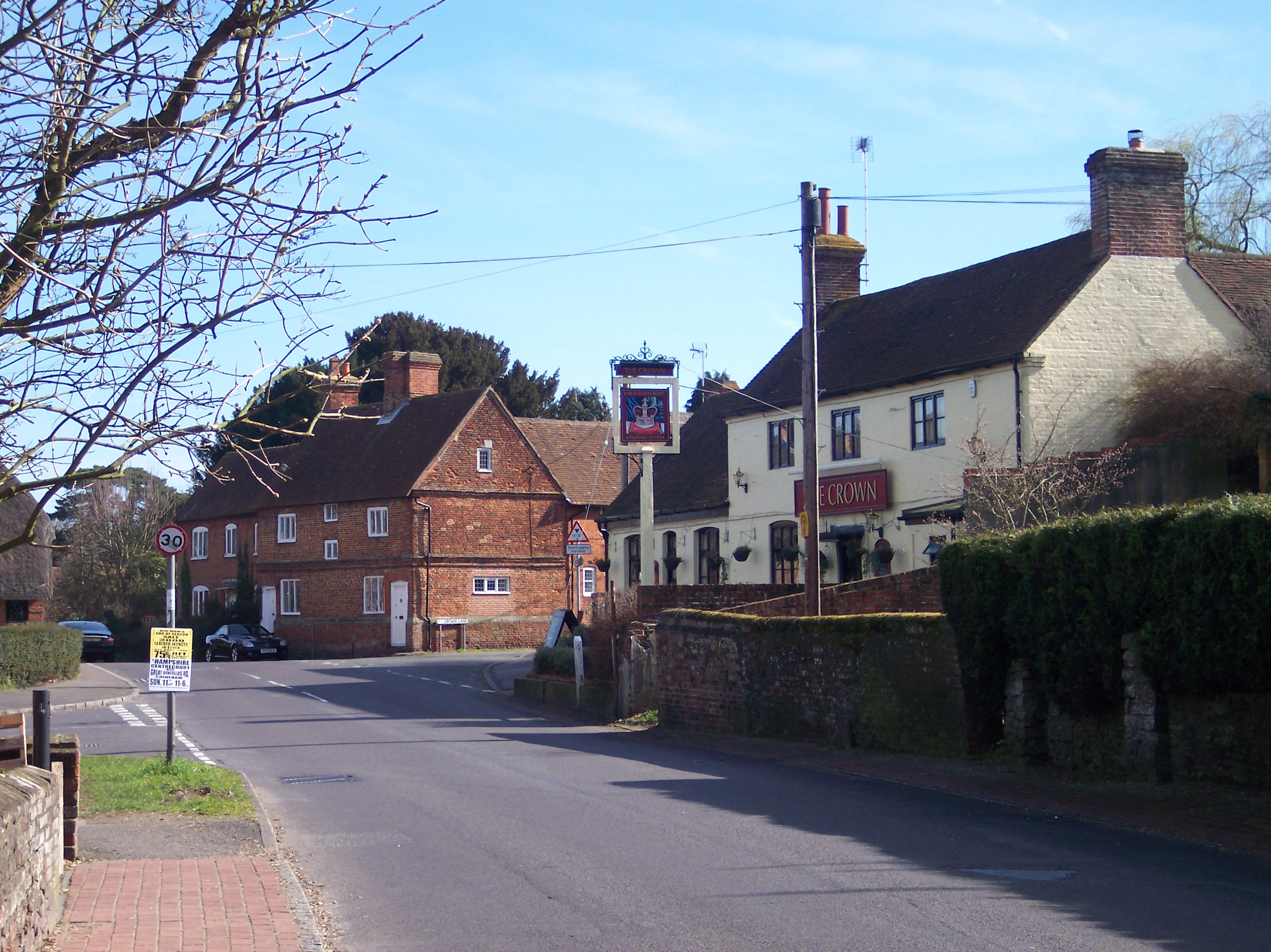
- The Street, Old Basing

- Location within Hampshire
- Population: 7,232
- OS grid reference: SU664528
  - London: 49.6 miles (79.8 km)
- Civil parish: Old Basing and Lychpit
- District: Basingstoke and Deane
- Shire county: Hampshire
- Region: South East
- Country: England
- Sovereign state: United Kingdom
- Post town: Basingstoke
- Postcode district: RG24
- Dialling code: 01256
- Police: Hampshire and Isle of Wight
- Fire: Hampshire and Isle of Wight
- Ambulance: South Central
- UK Parliament: North East Hampshire

Old Basing is a village in the civil parish of Old Basing and Lychpit, in the Basingstoke and Deane district, in Hampshire, England, just east of Basingstoke. It was called Basengum in the Anglo-Saxon Chronicle and Basinges in the Domesday Book.

== Etymology ==
The name Basing comes from two Old English components: Basa, the name of an Anglo-Saxon tribal leader, and the suffix -ingas, meaning "people of". This origin is shared with Basingstoke, which came from adding the additional component stoc, meaning "secondary farm/settlement", reflecting that Basing was originally the larger settlement. The adjective Old was added officially in the latter half of the 20th century (between 1968 and 1986 according to OS maps); a 1911 local history referred to the village as Basing, with Old Basing listed as an alternative name.

== History ==
Old Basing was first settled in the sixth century by a proto-Anglo-Saxon tribe known as the Basingas. In the ninth century it was a royal estate and it was the site of the Battle of Basing on or about 22 January 871 AD, when a Viking army defeated King Æthelred of Wessex and his brother, the future King Alfred the Great. It is also mentioned in the Domesday Book of 1086 AD.

The centre of the village, The Street, contains many old houses, and St Mary's Church. The River Loddon, whose source is in Worting to the west of Basingstoke, flows through the village. Old Basing is perhaps best known for the ruins of Basing House which was built between 1532 and 1561 on the site of a Norman castle. It was the home of the Marquesses of Winchester for several generations before being destroyed after a 24-week siege during the English Civil War. Many names in modern Old Basing allude to the war, such as Cavalier Road and Musket Copse, as well as several sites named after Oliver Cromwell including Oliver's Battery and Cromwell Cottage. Oliver's, a fish and chip takeaway and restaurant is named after Les Oliver who opened the restaurant in 1974.

The route of the former Basingstoke Canal also ran around Basing House and then through and around parts of Old Basing.

In the 1980s, the Lychpit estate was developed to the north of the village, within the boundaries of the civil parish. In 2006, the name of the civil parish was changed to "Old Basing and Lychpit".

== Governance ==
The village of Old Basing is part of the civil parish of Old Basing and Lychpit which in turn is part of the Basing ward of Basingstoke and Deane Borough Council. The borough council is a Non-metropolitan district of Hampshire County Council.

The Basing ward elects three councillors to Basingstoke and Deane Borough Council and is part of the North East Hampshire constituency in elections to Parliament. The current Member of Parliament for North East Hampshire is Alex Brewer (Liberal Democrat ) and the current councillors are Onnalee Cubitt (Independent), Stephen Marks (Conservative) and Sven Godesen (Conservative).

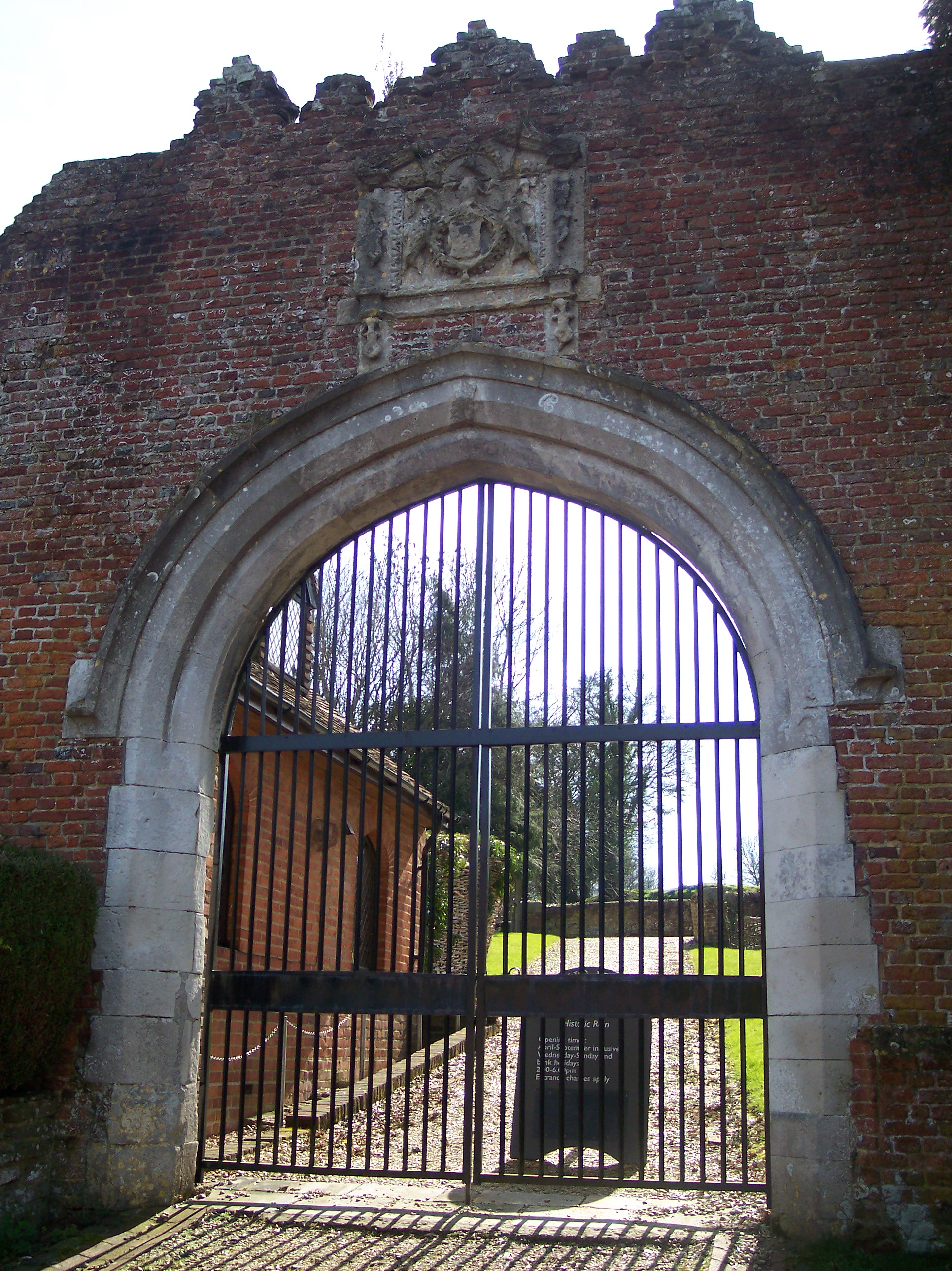
Entrance gate to the Basing House ruins, Old Basing.

== Education ==
Old Basing provides both an infant school and a junior school. The junior school, named St Mary's, is aided by the Church of England. A new primary school has recently opened in nearby Lychpit. There are a variety of secondary schools in the Basingstoke area.

== Sport ==
Basing Royals F.C., founded in 2018, is the local football team. The club plays their home games at Royals Park which is part of the wider Basingstoke Common and is situated next to the Old Basing British Legion. The Recreation Ground in Old Basing is used for a variety of sporting events as well as the Old Basing Carnival. There are football pitches which overlap a cricket ground in addition to five tennis courts, an archery area and a lawn bowling green.

== Literature ==
Edward Lear makes reference to Old Basing in his Book of Nonsense:

There was an Old Person of Basing,
Whose presence of mind was amazing;
He purchased a steed,
Which he rode at full speed,
And escaped from the people of Basing.

== People ==
- William Paulet, 1st Marquess of Winchester, buried at St. Mary's Church
- John Paulet, 2nd Marquess of Winchester, buried at St. Mary's Church
- Elizabeth Paulet, buried at St. Mary's Church
- William Paulet, 3rd Marquess of Winchester, buried at St. Mary's Church
- Elizabeth Seymour, Lady Cromwell, buried at St. Mary's Church
- William Paulet, 4th Marquess of Winchester, buried at St. Mary's Church
- Charles Paulet, 1st Duke of Bolton, buried at St. Mary's Church
