= Francis Courtenay (died 1638) =

English Member of Parliament

- Arms of Francis Courtenay of Powderham: Or, three torteaux a label azure
- Born: c. 1576
- Died: 3 June 1638 (aged 61–62)
- Resting place: St Clement's Church, Powderham, Devon; 50.6503°N 3.4547°W
- Occupation: MP
- Spouses: Mary Pole; Elizabeth Seymour
- Children: Sir William Courtenay, 1st Baronet; Edward Courtenay; Francis Courtenay; James Courtenay; Elizabeth Courtenay
- Parent(s): Sir William Courtenay; Elizabeth Manners

Francis Courtenay, de jure 4th Earl of Devon, (c. 1576 – 3 June 1638) of Powderham, Devon, was an English Member of Parliament. In 1831 he was recognised retrospectively as having been de jure 4th Earl of Devon, having succeeded his father in 1630.

== Origins ==
Courtenay was the second but eldest surviving son of Sir William Courtenay (1553–1630), de jure 3rd Earl of Devon of Powderham Castle, Devon, by his first wife Elizabeth, daughter of Henry Manners, 2nd Earl of Rutland (1526–1563).

== Career ==
He was MP for Devonshire in 1625 and possibly for Grampound in 1626. In 1633 he was Colonel of a regiment of the Devon Trained Bands.

== Marriages and issue ==
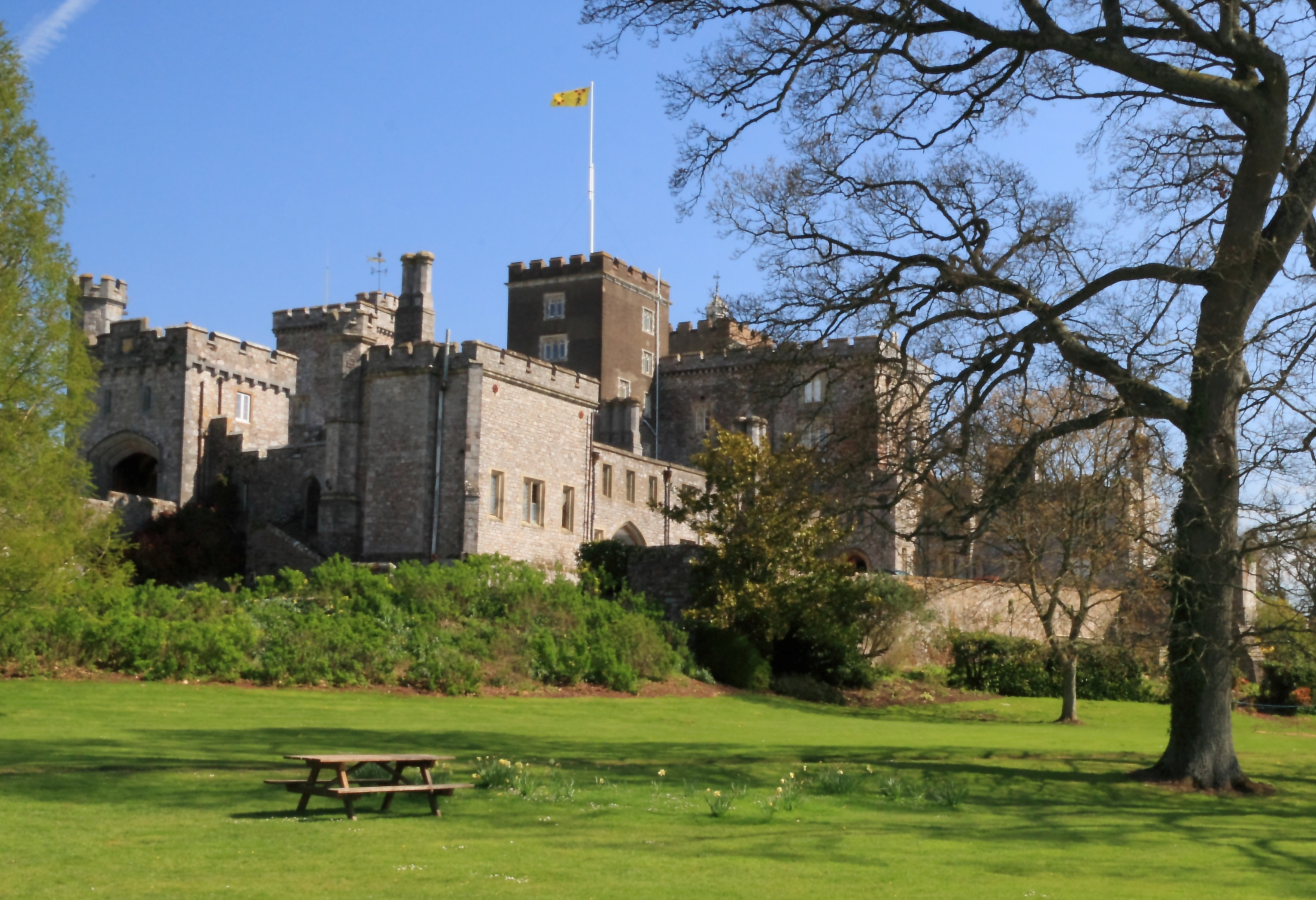
Powderham Castle, the Courtenay family seat

Courtenay married twice. He married firstly, 7 November 1606, Mary (born 1586), widow of Nicholas Hurst of Oxton, Devon and eldest daughter of Sir William Pole (1561–1635), of Colcomb, Devon. They had no children.

He married secondly, by 1628, Elizabeth, daughter of Sir Edward Seymour, 2nd Baronet (c. 1580 – 1659) of Berry Pomeroy, Devon, by whom he had issue:

- Sir William Courtenay, 1st Baronet (died 1702), married Margaret, daughter of Sir William Waller.
- Edward Courtenay, baptised on 17 July 1631 at Powderham.
- Francis Courtenay, baptised on 14 July 1633, married, 11 January 1658, Rebecca, daughter of Major John Webb of Exeter.
- James Courtenay, baptised on 18 January 1635 at Powderham.
- Elizabeth Courtenay

== Death ==
Courtenay died on 3 June and was buried on 5 June 1638 at Powderham, Devon. He was succeeded by his eldest son, William. His widow later married Sir Amos Meredith, 1st Baronet of Marston, Devon. She died by 6 February 1664.

== Notes ==
Peerage of England
Preceded by William Courtenay	Earl of Devon de jure 1630–1638	Succeeded by Sir William Courtenay, Bt
