= John Paulet, 2nd Marquess of Winchester =

English peer

The Most Honourable The Marquess of Winchester
- Arms of Paulet, Marquess of Winchester: Sable, three swords pilewise points in base proper pomels and hilts or

Governor of the Isle of Wight
- In office 1558–1565
- Monarch: Elizabeth I
- Chancellor: Sir Nicholas Bacon (as Lord Keeper)
- Preceded by: The Lord Cromwell
- Succeeded by: Sir Edward Horsey

High Sheriff of Hampshire
- In office 1533–1534
- Monarch: Henry VIII
- Chancellor: Sir Thomas Audley
- Preceded by: John Kaleway
- Succeeded by: Anthony Winsore

High Sheriff of Somerset and Dorset
- In office 1543–1544
- Monarch: Henry VIII
- Chancellor: Sir Thomas Audley
- Preceded by: Hugh Paulet
- Succeeded by: John Horsey

Personal details
- Born: John Paulet c. 1510
- Died: 4 November 1576 (aged 65–66) Chelsea, London, England
- Resting place: St Mary's Church, Basing, Hampshire; 51.271389°N 1.046667°W
- Spouses: Elizabeth Willoughby (m. 1528; died 1552) Elizabeth Seymour (m. 1554; died 1568) Winifred Brydges (m. 1568)
- Children: William Paulet, 3rd Marquess of Winchester; George Paulet; Thomas Paulet; Richard Paulet; Elizabeth Paulet; Mary Paulet
- Parent(s): William Paulet, 1st Marquess of Winchester (father); Elizabeth Capel (mother)
- 2nd Marquess of Winchester
- Tenure: 1572–1576
- Predecessor: William Paulet, 1st Marquess of Winchester
- Successor: William Paulet, 3rd Marquess of Winchester
- Other titles: 2nd Earl of Wiltshire; 2nd Baron St John

John Paulet, 2nd Marquess of Winchester (c. 1510 – 4 November 1576), styled The Honourable John Paulet between 1539 and 1550, Lord St John between 1550 and 1551 and Earl of Wiltshire between 1551 and 1572, was an English peer. He was the eldest son of William Paulet, 1st Marquess of Winchester and Elizabeth Capel.

== Career ==
John Paulet was knighted by King Henry VIII at Boulogne on 30 September 1544. After the death of King Edward VI he was (with his father) one of the signatories to the settlement of the Crown on Lady Jane Grey of 16 June 1553, although he later changed his allegiance to Queen Mary I. He was styled Lord St John from 1550 to 1572. He was summoned to Parliament on 3 October 1554 in one of his father's baronies as Lord St John. He was one of the peers at the trial of the Duke of Norfolk on 16 January 1572. He succeeded his father as Marquess of Winchester on 10 March 1572.

The offices he held during his career included:

- High Sheriff of Hampshire 1533–34
- High Sheriff of Somerset and Dorset 1543–44
- Steward of Canford castle 1549/50
- Constable of Corfe Castle 1549/50
- Lord Lieutenant of Dorset 1557
- Governor of the Isle of Wight 1558
- Keeper of St Andrew's Castle, Hamble 1572–1576

== Marriages and issue ==
Paulet was married three times:

- He married as his first wife, by 20 October 1528, Elizabeth Willoughby (d. 1552), daughter of Robert Willoughby, 2nd Baron Willoughby de Broke by his second wife, Dorothy, daughter of Thomas Grey, 1st Marquess of Dorset, and by her had four sons and two daughters:

- William Paulet, 3rd Marquess of Winchester (c. 1532 – 24 November 1598)
- George Paulet
- Richard Paulet
- Thomas Paulet
- Elizabeth Paulet, married firstly Sir William Courtenay of Powderham and secondly Sir Henry Ughtred
- Mary Paulet (died 10 October 1592), married Henry Cromwell, 2nd Baron Cromwell

- He married secondly, between 10 March and 24 April 1554, Elizabeth Seymour, daughter of Sir John Seymour and Margery Wentworth, and widow of Gregory Cromwell, 1st Baron Cromwell.
- He married thirdly, before 30 September 1568, Winifred, widow of Sir Richard Sackville, and daughter of John Brydges, a former Lord Mayor of London. He succeeded his father as Marquess of Winchester in 1572.

== Death ==
John Paulet died at Chelsea on 4 November 1576 and was buried in St. Mary's Church, Basing, Hampshire. His widow, Winifred, died at Chelsea in 1586 and was buried in Westminster Abbey.

== Bibliography ==
- Cokayne, G. E. (1913). Gibbs, Vicary (ed.). The Complete Peerage of England, Scotland, Ireland, Great Britain and the United Kingdom. Vol. III. London: St. Catherine Press.
- Cokayne, G. E. (1898). Complete Peerage of England, Scotland, Ireland, Great Britain and the United Kingdom, Extant, Extinct or Dormant. Vol. VIII. Exeter: William Pollard.
- Cokayne, G. E. (1959). White, Geoffrey H. (ed.). The Complete Peerage, or a History of the House of Lords and all its Members from the Earliest Times. Vol. XII(II). London: St Catherine Press.
- Faris, David (1999). Plantagenet Ancestry of Seventeenth-Century Colonists: The Descent from the Later Plantagenet Kings of England, Henry III, Edward I, Edward II, and Edward III, of Emigrants from England and Wales to the North American Colonies Before 1701 (2nd ed.). Boston, MA: New England Historic Genealogical Society. ISBN 0880821078.
- "Letters and Papers, Foreign and Domestic, Henry VIII (1509–1547)". British History Online.
- Metcalfe, Walter C. (1885). Book of Knights Banneret, Knights of the Bath, and Knights Bachelor. London: Mitchell and Hughes.
- Mosley, Charles, ed. (2003). Burke's Peerage, Baronetage and Knightage. Vol. 1 (107th ed.). Wilmington: Burke's Peerage & Gentry. ISBN 0971196621.
- Richardson, Douglas (2011). Everingham, Kimball G. (ed.). Magna Carta Ancestry: A Study in Colonial and Medieval Families. Vol. III (2nd ed.). CreateSpace. ISBN 978-1461045205.
- Tait, James (1895). "Paulet, William (1485?-1572)". In Lee, Sidney (ed.). Dictionary of National Biography. Vol. 44. London: Smith, Elder & Co. pp. 92–94.

Peerage of England
Preceded by William Paulet	Marquess of Winchester; 1572–1576	Succeeded by William Paulet
Preceded by William Paulet	Baron St John of Basing (writ in acceleration); 1544–1572	Succeeded by William Paulet
