= Ernest Caswell Long =

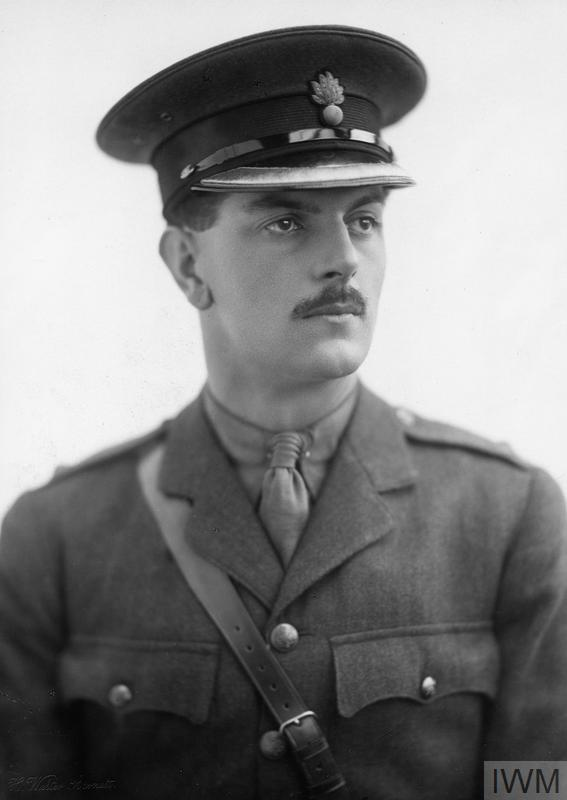
Second Lieutenant Ernest Caswell Long, 1916

Captain Ernest Caswell "Boy" Long (8 May 1892 – 26 August 1950) was an English soldier and rancher in Kenya known for being a glamorous playboy and well-known member of the Happy Valley set.

== Early life ==
Long was born on 8 May 1892 in Ogbourne St Andrew, Wiltshire, England. He was the son of George Long and Eleanor Carwardine. He was the brother of Charles Aubrey Long and Henry Stephen Long, who both later worked for him.

His paternal grandparents were Robert Caswell Long and Emma Deacon. His maternal grandfather was the Rev. Henry Alexander Carwardine, Vicar of Ogbourne St Andrew.

== Career ==
During World War I, he was a Captain in the Grenadier Guards.

Long first came to Kenya, around 1912, as tutor to The Hon. Thomas Cholmondeley, only son and heir of Hugh Cholmondeley, 3rd Baron Delamere and was selected by his mother, Lady Florence Anne Cole (the daughter of Lowry Cole, 4th Earl of Enniskillen). In time, he became manager for Lord Delamare residing at Soysambu, Elmenteita, until c. 1926, when he resigned after marrying Genesta (née Heath) Farquhar.

The Longs purchased a large block of land from R.A.B. Chamberlain and began operating the Nderit Estate overlooking Lake Nakuru in East Africa, also at Elmenteita, where he became a successful breeder and dairy farmer. For many years, he served as Chairman of the Kenya Co-operative Creameries Ltd., succeeding Lord Delamere. He also served as Chairman of the Stockbreeders Co-operative Society Ltd. for many years. In his later years, Long largely retired from public life due to ill-health.

== Personal life ==
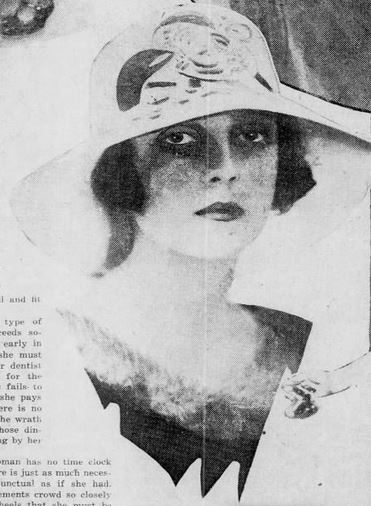
Photograph of his third wife, Paula

Long was thrice married. His first marriage was at St James's Church in Paddington on 30 April 1917 to Mary Millicent Erskine-Wemyss, the only daughter of Randolph Gordon Erskine-Wemyss of Wemyss Castle, and Lady Lillian Mary Paulet (a daughter of the 14th Marquess of Winchester). She was the sister of Michael Erskine-Wemyss (who married Lady Victoria Cavendish-Bentinck, only daughter of William Cavendish-Bentinck, 6th Duke of Portland). There are no recorded children from this marriage.

=== Second marriage ===
In 1924 in Kenya, he remarried to heiress Genesta Mary (née Heath) Farquhar, the daughter of insurance executive Cuthbert Eden Heath and Sarah Caroline Gore Gambier . She was previously married to Arthur McNeill Farquhar, son of Adm. Sir Arthur Murray Farquhar. Before their divorce, they were the parents of:

- Robert Eden Charles Caswell "Robin" Long (1926–2007)

After their divorce, she married Capt. Lord Claud David Hamilton (1907-1968), a younger son of 3rd Duke of Abercorn, in 1946. Reportedly, he had an affair with English aviator Beryl Markham on and off until the 1930s. Markham is also known for her affairs with Prince Henry, Duke of Gloucester (a younger son of George V), who became besotted with her during his trip to Kenya, as well as an affair with his older brother, Edward, Prince of Wales (later Edward VIII) during this time.

=== Third marriage ===
His third marriage was to debutante and model Paula Alexandra Gertrude Marie (née Gellibrand) Allen, the daughter of Welsh timber merchant William Clarke Gellibrand, and granddaughter of James Dever (who represented Saint John division in the Senate of Canada). She was previously married, and divorced, from Pedro Monés, Marquess of Casa Maury (who married Freda Dudley Ward after his divorce from Paula), and William Edward David Allen, MP.

Long died in Nairobi, Kenya, on 26 August 1950 and was buried at the City Park Cemetery there. The sole executor of his estate was his son Robin.
