= Randolph Wemyss =

Laird of Wemyss Castle (1858–1908)

Captain Randolph Gordon Erskine Wemyss (11 July 1858 – 17 July 1908) was Laird of Wemyss Castle and Chief of Clan Wemyss.

== Early life ==
He was born in Wemyss Castle on 11 July 1858, the eldest son on James Hay Erskine Wemyss, MP for Fife (a grandson of the 17th Earl of Erroll), and Augusta Millicent Anne Mary Kennedy Erskine. Among his siblings were Mary Frances Erskine-Wemyss, who married Cecil Stratford Paget (a son of Gen. Lord George Paget), Dora Mina Erskine-Wemyss, who married Lord Henry Grosvenor (third son of the 1st Duke of Westminster), and Rosslyn Wemyss, who was created 1st Baron Wester Wemyss.

His maternal grandparents were the Hon. John Kennedy Erskine of Dun (son of the 1st Marquess of Ailsa) and his wife Lady Augusta FitzClarence (an illegitimate daughter of King William IV of the United Kingdom by his mistress Dora Bland). Through his sister Dora, he was uncle to William Grosvenor, 3rd Duke of Westminster.

He was tutored at home by Revd. John Thomson; minister of St. Adrian's church in West Wemyss, until he entered Eton College in 1873.

== Career ==
In January 1900 he embarked on the steam yacht "Vanadis" for a honeymoon cruise to Egypt and South Africa. The honeymoon, however, was interrupted by the outbreak of the Boer War. Wemyss donated the yacht to the war effort as a hospital ship and he was promoted to the rank of Captain and on 4 September 1900 travelled to Mafeking with Charles Cavendish, 3rd Baron Chesham. He returned from South Africa in July 1901.

=== Business career ===
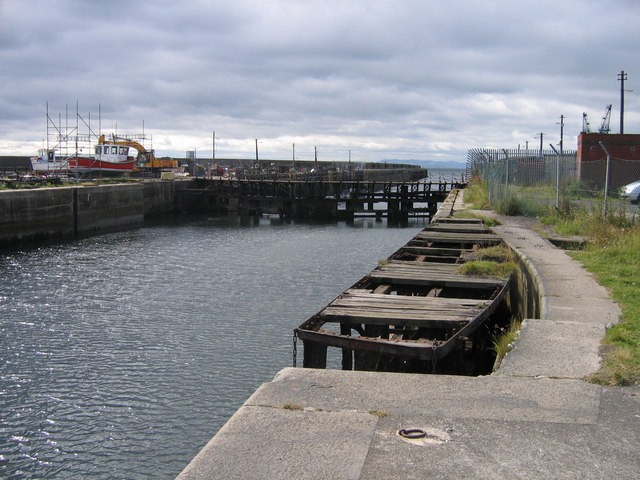
Number 3 dock, Methil

Following the early death of his father in March 1864, he inherited the Lairdship and the estates. Day-to-day management was carried out by his mother until he reached the age of twenty-one.

The principal activity on the estate was coal extraction centred on West Wemyss, under the Wemyss Coal Company. A new wet dock was opened in 1872 at a cost of £10,000 (equivalent to £977,683 as of 2025). Railway schemes were developed to assist the business, and construction of the Wemyss Private Railway from Thornton to Buckhaven began in 1879, and was completed in 1881 at a cost of £25,000 (equivalent to £2,628,181 as of 2025).

After his service in the Boer War, business continued in the coalfields on his estates, the docks at Methil and the creation of the Wemyss and District Tramways Company from Leven to Kirkcaldy.

As a benevolent landlord, he provided improved housing for workers. He oversaw the developments at East and Coaltown of Wemyss, and a new village at Denbeath. He personally spent around £75,000 (equivalent to £7,800,664 as of 2025), on housing in the parish.

General Election 1895: West Fife
Party	Candidate	Votes	%	±%
Liberal	Augustine Birrell	4,719	61.4	−14.8
Liberal Unionist	Randolph Gordon Erskine-Wemyss	2,965	38.6	+14.8
Majority		1,754	22.8	−29.6
Turnout			72.2	+2.3
Liberal hold		Swing	-14.8	

== Personal life ==
On 18 July 1884, Randolph was married to Lady Lillian Mary Paulet, only daughter of John Paulet, 14th Marquess of Winchester and the Hon. Mary Montagu (a daughter of the 6th Baron Rokeby). Both of his brothers-in-law, Augustus John Henry Beaumont Paulet (who was killed in the Second Boer War) and Henry William Montagu Paulet, succeeded to the Marquessate of Winchester. Before their divorce in 1898, they were the parents of two children:

- Mary Millicent Erskine-Wemyss (1885–1968), who married Capt. Ernest Caswell Long on 30 April 1917. They divorced and he married Genesta Mary (née Heath) Farquhar in 1924 (former wife of Arthur McNeill Farquhar, son of Adm. Sir Arthur Murray Farquhar. After their divorce, Genesta married Capt. Lord Claud David Hamilton, son of James Hamilton, 3rd Duke of Abercorn). They divorced and Long married Paula (née Gellibrand) Allen (former wife of William Edward David Allen and Pedro Monés, Marquess of Casa Maury).
- Michael John Erskine-Wemyss (1888–1982), who married Lady Victoria Alexandrina Violet Cavendish-Bentinck, daughter of William Cavendish-Bentinck, 6th Duke of Portland on 25 November 1918.

His second marriage was to Lady Eva Cecilia Margaret Wellesley, daughter of William Henry Wellesley, 2nd Earl Cowley on 23 November 1899. In 1911 Lady Eva hosted suffragette standard-bearer Emmeline Pankhurst at Wemyss Castle on the latter's tour of Scotland, as reported in Votes for Women, the organ of Pankhurst's Women's Social and Political Union.

Following a death in November 1907 at the Lochhead and Victoria of a miner, Wemyss, assisted with the underground rescue operations, and developed symptoms from shock and exposure. He never recovered and died on 17 July 1908. He was buried at Wemyss in the Chapel Garden.

=== Legacy ===
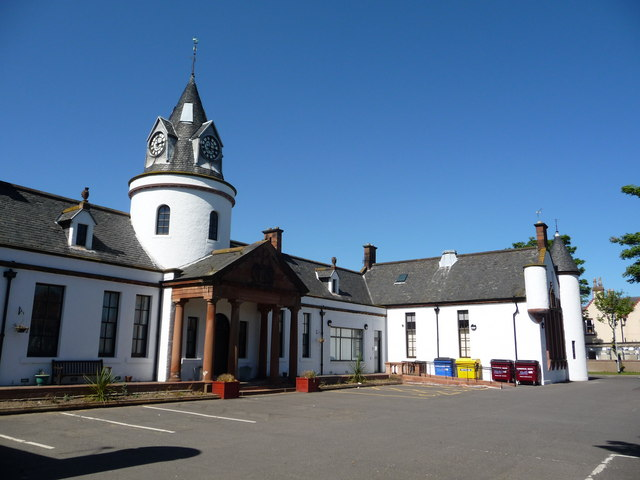
Randolph Wemyss Memorial Hospital, Buckhaven

In a speech in the House of Commons on 21 October 1909, James Falconer MP for Forfarshire said:-

“Mr. Wemyss had taken all the risks in developing his property at a cost of £1,000,000. He has provided employment for thousands of men, had provided them with travelling facilities and built dwelling houses which were a model to everyone. The rates paid in respect of the enterprise amounted to £8,000 to £9,000 a year. I know no instance which is so much to be commended from the point of view of anyone interested in the development of the country. It is a real romance of enterprise, which has not been equalled in my time in Scotland.”

The Randolph Wemyss Memorial Hospital was erected in Buckhaven in his memory at a cost of £10,000, and opened on 28 August 1909.

== Publications ==
- 1895 "The Maid of Norway and other poems by R. Erskine Wemyss". Published privately.
