= Michael Erskine-Wemyss =

Captain Michael Erskine Wemyss of Wemyss DL, JP
- Born: 8 March 1888; London, England
- Died: 8 September 1982 (aged 94); Wemyss Castle, East Wemyss, Scotland
- Spouse: Lady Victoria Cavendish-Bentinck (m. 1918; died 1982)
- Children: David Wemyss; Andrew Wemyss
- Parent(s): Randolph Erskine-Wemyss; Lady Lillian Mary Paulet
- Relatives: James Hay Erskine-Wemyss (grandfather); John Paulet, 14th Marquess of Winchester (grandfather); William Grosvenor, 3rd Duke of Westminster (cousin); Augustus Paulet, 15th Marquess of Winchester (uncle); Henry Paulet, 16th Marquess of Winchester (uncle)

Captain Michael John Erskine-Wemyss (also Michael Wemyss of that Ilk) DL JP (8 March 1888 – 8 September 1982) was Laird of Wemyss Castle and Chief of Clan Wemyss.

== Early life ==
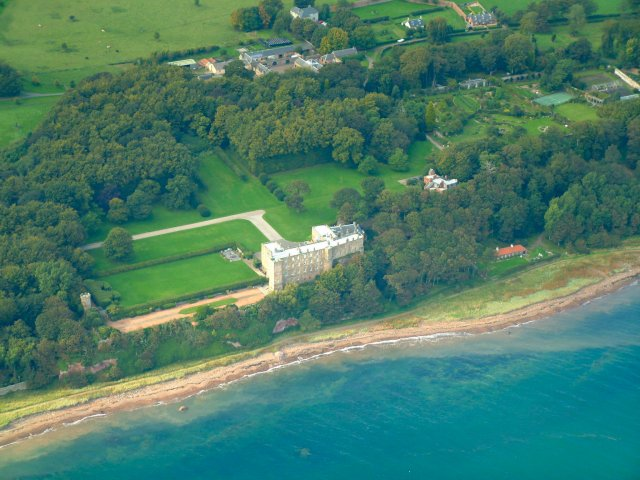
Aerial view of Wemyss Castle and gardens

Erskine-Wemyss was born in London, England on 8 March 1888. He was the only son of Randolph Gordon Erskine-Wemyss (1858–1908) of Wemyss Castle, and Lady Lillian Mary Paulet. After his parents divorced in 1898, his father married Lady Eva Cecilia Margaret Wellesley (daughter of the 2nd Earl Cowley) in November 1898. His mother did not remarry before her death in November 1952. In 1917 his sister Mary Millicent Erskine-Wemyss married, as his first wife, Lt. Ernest Caswell Long, of the Grenadier Guards. (Note: After their divorce, Ernest Caswell Long (1892–1950), who was known as "Boy" Long, was a rancher at Elementaita in Kenya and married Genesta Mary (née Heath) Farquhar in 1924 (former wife of Arthur McNeill Farquhar, son of Adm. Sir Arthur Murray Farquhar. After their divorce, she married Capt. Lord Claud David Hamilton, son of James Hamilton, 3rd Duke of Abercorn). They divorced and Long married Paula (née Gellibrand) Allen (Long was named in Paula's 1939 divorce from her second husband, William Edward David Allen. Her first husband was Pedro Monés, Marquess of Casa Maury (who married Freda Dudley Ward after his divorce from Paula).)

His paternal grandparents were James Hay Erskine-Wemyss, MP for Fife (a grandson of the 17th Earl of Erroll) and Augusta Millicent Anne Mary Kennedy-Erskine. (Note: Augusta Millicent Anne Mary Kennedy-Erskine (1831–1895) was the youngest daughter of the Hon. John Kennedy Erskine of Dun (son of the 1st Marquess of Ailsa) and his wife Lady Augusta FitzClarence (an illegitimate daughter of King William IV by his mistress Dora Bland).) Among his paternal family were aunts, Mary Frances Erskine-Wemyss, who married Cecil Stratford Paget (a son of Gen. Lord George Paget), and Dora Mina Erskine-Wemyss, who married Lord Henry Grosvenor (third son of the 1st Duke of Westminster). Through his aunt Dora, he was a first cousin of William Grosvenor, 3rd Duke of Westminster. His maternal grandparents were John Paulet, 14th Marquess of Winchester and Hon. Mary Montagu (a daughter of 6th Baron Rokeby). Both of his maternal uncles, Augustus John Henry Beaumont Paulet (who was killed in the Second Boer War) and Henry William Montagu Paulet, succeeded his grandfather as the Marquess of Winchester.

== Career ==
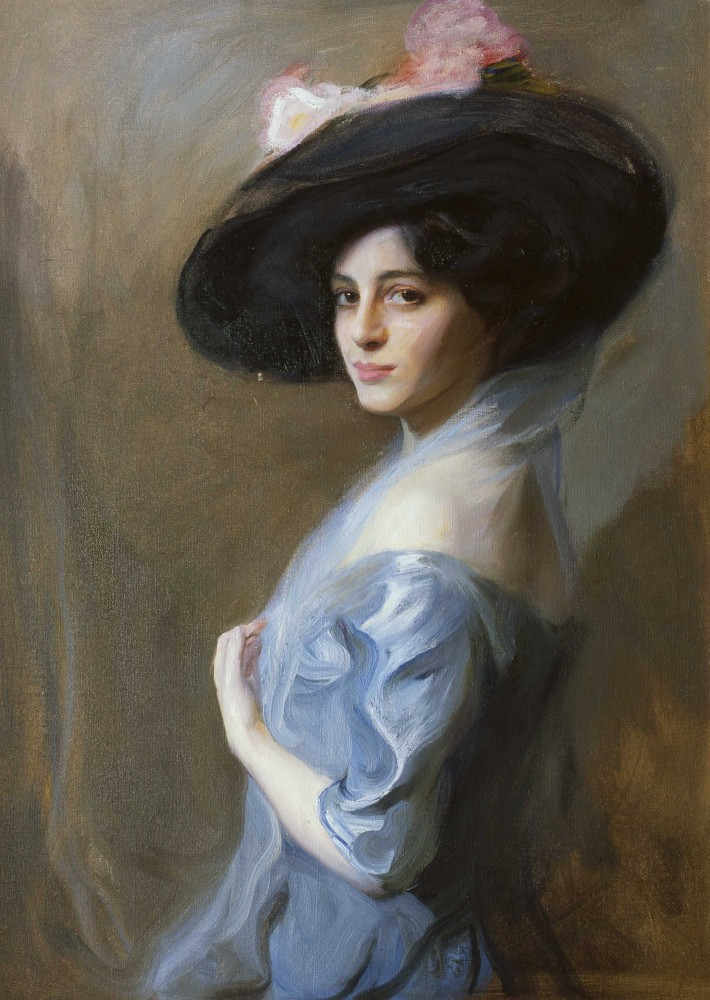
Portrait of his wife, Lady Victoria, by Philip de Laszlo, 1911

Upon his father's death in 1908, he succeeded as Laird of Wemyss Castle and Chief of Clan Wemyss. In 1911, his stepmother hosted suffragette standard-bearer Emmeline Pankhurst at Wemyss Castle on the latter's tour of Scotland.

He served as a Captain in the Royal Horse Guards. From 1914 to 1919, fought with the Royal Garrison Artillery and Army Signal Service in World War I, where he was wounded.

He served as a Justice of the Peace for Fife and as Deputy Lieutenant of Fife in 1936.

== Personal life ==
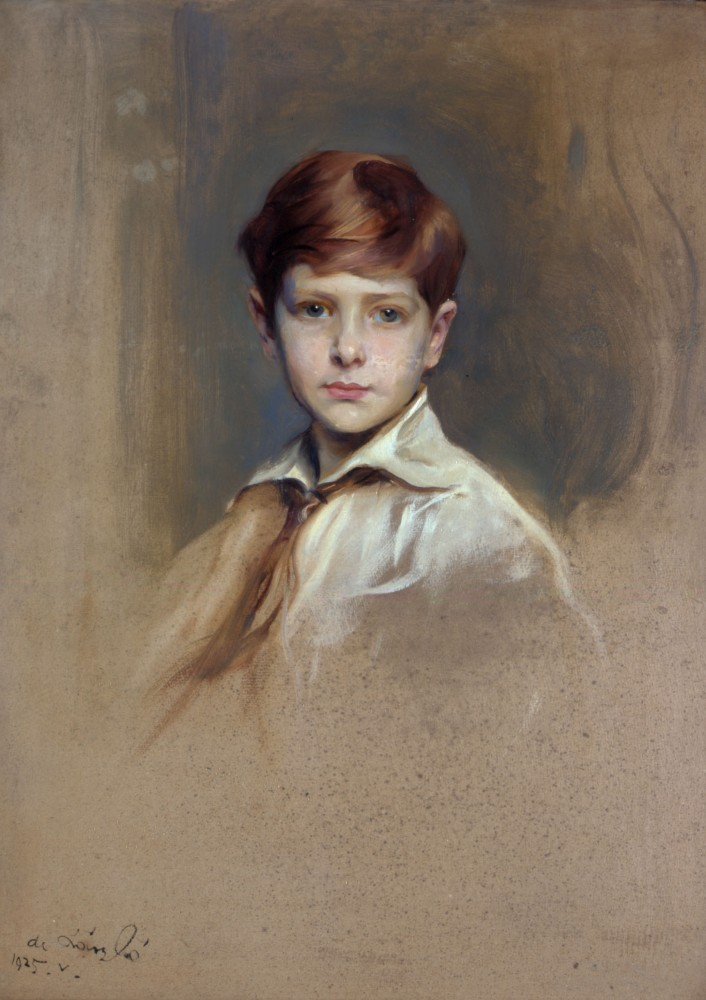
Portrait of his son, David, by Philip de Laszlo, 1925

On 25 November 1918, he married Lady Victoria Alexandrina Violet Cavendish-Bentinck (1890–1994), only daughter of William Cavendish-Bentinck, 6th Duke of Portland and Winifred Anna Dallas-Yorke (a daughter of Thomas Dallas-Yorke, of Walmsgate, Lincolnshire). Her brother was William Cavendish-Bentinck, 7th Duke of Portland. Together, they lived at Wemyss Castle, Fife, Scotland and were the parents of two sons:

- David Erskine-Wemyss (1920–2005), who married Lady Jean Christian Bruce, daughter of Edward Bruce, 10th Earl of Elgin and Hon. Katherine Elizabeth Cochrane (a daughter of the 1st Baron Cochrane and Lady Gertrude Boyle), in 1945.
- Andrew Michael John Erskine-Wemyss (b. 1925), who married Janet Althea Scott, daughter of Maj. John Swire Scott of Eredine House, and Alethea Abel Smith (sister of Vice-Admiral Sir Conolly Abel Smith), in 1967.

Wemyss died at Wemyss Castle in East Wemyss, Fife on 8 September 1982 at age 94. His wife, who was an Extra Woman of the Bedchamber to Queen Elizabeth II, was the last surviving godchild of Queen Victoria until her death in 1994.
