= Thomas Edward Knowles Stansfield =

British Pathologist and Medical Officer (1862–1939)

Lieutenant-Colonel Thomas Edward Knowles Stansfield CBE
- Born: 1862; Todmorden, Yorkshire
- Died: 19 February 1939 (aged 76–77); Sanremo, Kingdom of Italy
- Education: Owens College, Manchester; University of Edinburgh (MB)
- Occupations: Pathologist; Medical Officer
- Spouse(s): (1) Mary Caroline Dever (d. 1926) (2) Marie Effremoff (d.1973)

Thomas Edward Knowles Stansfield, CBE (1862 – 19 February 1939) was a British pathologist of mental illnesses and medical officer. The son of a leather merchant from Todmorden, Stansfield trained in Medicine at the University of Edinburgh and graduated (MB) in 1889 with an interest in pathology. Shortly afterwards he took up a junior position at London County Council's Banstead Asylum, where he set about improving working practices and establishing a laboratory. He rose quickly through the ranks, and was appointed Senior Assistant Medical Officer at the new Claybury Asylum in 1893. Five years later, he was transferred to Bexley Mental Hospital as Superintendent, serving there until he retired in 1921.

Inspired by German and American examples, he successfully asked the council to construct a system of villas at Bexley, advocated the separate treatment of acute and chronic cases, and introduced parole-style rewards for 'industrious' patients. Like some of his earlier administrative innovations, villas became popular and inspired similar designs elsewhere. Stansfield also served in the Royal Army Medical Corps during World War I, and as a consultant on nervous diseases to the Eastern Command. Although he was appointed a CBE in the 1919 Birthday Honours for his war work, historians have drawn attention to his scepticism about shell shock, his attitudes towards eugenics and heredity, and his potentially misogynistic views about medical officers marrying. He nonetheless married twice, settling with his first wife at a house in Wimbledon where he enjoyed tending to the gardens; after her death, he married a second time in 1929 and moved to a villa in Sanremo, Italy, where he lived out his retirement.

== Early life and education ==
Thomas Edward Knowles Stansfield was born in 1862, the son of Thomas Stansfield (1831–1908), of Langfield, Todmorden, Yorkshire, a leather merchant who operated out of Roomfield Buildings, Todmorden, and his wife Hannah, daughter of William Knowles. The younger Thomas had a brother, William Walker Stansfield (1856–1943), also of Roomfield, Todmorden, whose daughter Hannah Mary (1899–1989) married Vladeta Popović (1894–1951), the first head of Belgrade University's English Department; Marija Stansfield-Popovic (as she was known in Serbia) was also a respected English scholar at the university. (Note: She graduated from Cambridge with a BA in 1920; Vladeta Popovic, son of Professor Avram Popovic, studied at Peterhouse, Cambridge, and took a BA in 1921, and PhD from the University of London in 1928.)

The family was well-established in the Todmorden area, which straddled the Lancashire and Yorkshire borders, and were reputedly connected with Stansfield Hall, Todmorden. Stansfield's entry into the medical profession came late. After one year of study at Owen's College, Manchester (1884–85), he transferred to the University of Edinburgh, graduating with a Bachelor of Medicine (MB) degree in 1889, aged 27.

== Career ==
=== London County Council ===
==== Banstead Asylum ====
With an interest in pathology, Stansfield spent the last few months of his time in Edinburgh working at the Royal Infirmary. In 1889, the London County Council (LCC) was established and took over the running of several London mental asylums; in the process, it advertised for a Fourth Assistant Medical Officer and Pathologist at Banstead Asylum, essentially a junior assistant with pathological duties which often related to postmortems. Stansfield successfully applied for the position. While at Banstead, he became interested in the pathology of mental illness and asylum administration. Accustomed to the laboratories at Edinburgh and drilled in rigorous note-taking skills, he set about instilling similar facilities and ethos at Banstead under the auspices of its superintendent, Dr T. Claye Shaw. Each ward would also have its own fixed notebook for medical officers, a practice which over time spread to all other asylums in the country. Thanks to this and his enjoying good relations with its steward, F. Alderton, Stansfield was made Banstead's Second Assistant Medical Officer in 1890 and, when Claybury Asylum opened in 1892–93, he was transferred there as First Assistant Medical Officer, helped by Claye Shaw's influence at the LCC. Over the course of the 1890s, he visited numerous domestic and foreign institutions, travelling to Germany and the United States.

==== Bexley Mental Hospital ====
In 1898, Stansfield was appointed Superintendent at Bexley Mental Hospital and advocated the cottage or villa system of dispersed accommodation unconnected by corridors; this was, in his opinion, more economical and made the classification and separation of recent and chronic cases easier. He also recommended a significant increase in the number of medical staff, and the use of parole and rewards for "practicable or industrious" patients. He was able to influence the LCC enough that they added villas to Bexley and used them at the Hellingly Hospital (opened in 1903). Stansfield remained superintendent at Bexley until 1921 and his tenure witnessed the institution of his parole system and the construction of a hospital wing for men. Some of his views have proven controversial. He pointed to the "mass of degeneracy in the lower ranks of the population which is increasing out of all proportion to the remainder of the population" and asked "how are we as a nation to overcome the evil and stem the flow of this rising tide?" This was a view, and a question, which played into wider debates about eugenics at the turn of the 20th century. The years after the First World War and their changes frustrated him, spurring his retirement in 1921, although he served as President of the Kent Branch of the British Medical Association for the 1921–22 year.

=== War service ===
During the First World War, Stansfield served with the Royal Army Medical Corps, eventually as a Lieutenant-Colonel, and was appointed Consultant for Nervous and Mental Diseases to the Eastern Command (1915–22); it was thanks to these services that he was appointed Commander of the Order of the British Empire in the 1919 Birthday Honours. Like many other superintendents, his attitude towards war patients was less than sympathetic and he was skeptical about 'shell shock', claiming that, of the 61 soldier patients admitted to Bexley, only 5 had served abroad; he thought many others were suffering from preexisting or general psychiatric problems (something he reiterated in a 1919 letter to The Times). In his words, the Board of Control Service Patient scheme to deal with war-related psychological trauma employed "extravagant and unjust [means to] make such a distinction between soldier patients and the hundreds of patients who are far more genuinely the victims of the battle of everyday life".

== Later life and family ==
Stansfield had long felt uncomfortable with the idea of medical officers marrying. Louise Hide, in Gender and Class in English Asylums, 1890–1914, hints that this might have been the result of misogynist tendencies, although Hubert Bond, his obituary-writer and former colleague, preemptively defended him against these claims. Stansfield nevertheless married twice; firstly, in 1908 to Mary Caroline (died 1926), a daughter of the Hon. James Dever, a Canadian senator from St John's, Newfoundland. After her death, he married (in 1929) Marie, second daughter of Alexander Effremoff, of Moscow; he had met her in Paris, where she had been living in exile after the Russian Revolution. There were no children from either marriage, but he worked with the Scouting movement, and served as President of the North Central Kent Boys' Scouts Association. He was a fond rose-grower and it was the gardens at Southmead, Wimbledon, which attracted him and his first wife to the house; they lived there for many years. He retired to Castello Devachan in Sanremo, Italy, with his second wife, before going to Paris to seek treatment for an illness; he died there on 19 February 1939. His widow remained at the Castello in Sanremo until her death in 1973, spending her last 21 years as starosta of the Russian Orthodox parish community there. (Note: She took up the position in 1952, on the death of Maria Botkina Tret'jakova; she was succeeded by Natalia Burmazovic (died 1991).)

== Archives ==
One file of Stansfield's personal papers dated 1884–94 is held with a collection of material relating to his family at the West Yorkshire Archive Service, Calderdale (reference number WYC:1069/53).
