= Paula Gellibrand =

English society beauty and mannequin

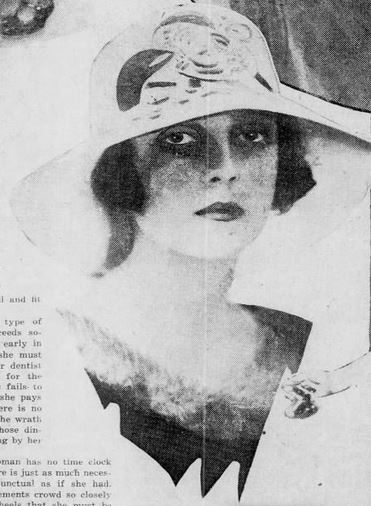
- Portrait of Paula Gellibrand from 1924
- Born: Paula Alexandra Gertrude Gellibrand; 25 July 1898; Penarth, Glamorgan, Wales
- Died: 1 December 1986 (aged 88); Wandsworth, London
- Occupations: Society beauty; mannequin
- Spouse(s): Pedro Monés, Marquess of Casa Maury (m. 1923, divorced) William Edward David Allen (m. 1932; div. 1939) Ernest Caswell Long (died 1950)
- Parents: William Clarke Gellibrand (father); Isabel Marie Dever (mother)
- Relatives: James Dever (grandfather)

Paula Alexandra Gertrude Long (née Gellibrand; formerly Marquise de Casa Maury 1 December 1898 – 25 July 1986) was an English society beauty and mannequin, once one of the favourite models of Cecil Beaton, and described by contemporaries as "the most beautiful woman in Europe". Her sister was Nadeja Gellibrand, also known as Nada Ruffer, Vogue editor.

== Background and early life ==
Gellibrand was born in Penarth in 1898. She was the daughter of William Clarke Gellibrand, a timber importer based in Cardiff, and, his second wife, Isabel Marie Dever. From her father's first marriage to Agnes Steel Drynan Johnson (a daughter of Charles Johnson of Richmond, Surrey), who died in 1886. she was a half-sister to Guy Gellibrand (born 5 December 1886).

Her paternal grandfather was Thomas Samuel Gellibrand, a Russia merchant, of Morgan Gellibrand and Co. Her maternal grandfather was James Dever. His maternal aunt, Adah Felicitas Dever, married Frederick Arthur Roberts (son of the merchant William Roberts and a British graduate of Trinity Hall, Cambridge) in 1891.

William left Penarth for London at some point in 1903. In 1906 his address was 169 Queen's Gate, Kensington. When his elder daughter Noel (Margaret Adah Noel Nadeja Gellibrand) was married in June 1917, he was in Petrograd, and the bride was given away by Knowles Stansfield; he had married in 1908 Isabel's sister Mary Caroline. The Gellibrand family had by this time moved within Kensington to 2 Drayton Court, Drayton Gardens.

William Clarke Gellibrand died in 1919.

== Social career ==
=== Debutante, mannequin, model ===
Paula Gellibrand came out as a "striking" debutante in 1919. That year Augustus John painted the portrait Portrait of Baronne Baba d'Erlanger and Miss Paula Gellibrand. She made a London social splash around 1920, as a protégée of the Baroness d'Erlanger. The Baroness's daughter Mary Liliane Matilda, called Baba (1901–1945), was her fashion stylist and childhood friend. When Coco Chanel opened a London boutique in 1927, dressing Baba, Paula and Daisy Fellowes, the three could be considered "London's leading beauties".

Gellibrand was the first London debutante to work as a mannequin. She was followed by others such as Nancy Beaton. She was known as "The Gellibrand".

She began in the shop owned by the Baroness d'Erlanger. In 1922 she was working as a mannequin at the dressmaker Madame Victoire, in Brompton Road, with the Baroness; the Baroness and her daughter painted dress designs. The Victoire business at 229 Brompton Road in 1921 provided stage costumes for Viola Tree's production of The Tempest at the Aldwych Theatre. In a space above it, the Baroness held with assistance from Marcel Boulestin an exhibition of works by Jean Émile Laboureur.

A noted 1928 photographic session for Condé Nast by Cecil Beaton of Gellibrand posed her in a sequin dress in front of a sequin curtain at her modernist home. In 1933, Beaton described Gellibrand as "a good-looking tomboy, with gold hair and mushroom-coloured skin around the eyes". She was

"[...] seen at every ball and appeared in Society pageants in the form of a Grecian goddess, and as the months passed, her beauty became more exotically attenuated [...] when I see her in fancy-dress costume, I cannot believe that I have not designed her myself, she is so exactly like my idea of what a beauty of to-day should be."

He was particularly struck by her "Modigliani features and exquisitely slender hands." Sheila Chisholm wrote:

Paula's blonde beauty was quite unique. She had large strange-coloured eyes, and her hair was the colour of light and dark honey. She was tall and dressed to perfection.

=== Associations ===
After both were married, Paula struck up a long-lasting friendship with Edwina Mountbatten. She and her husband in 1926 visited the Mountbattens at Adsdean House, which they had leased, near Chichester. In wartime and by then Paula Long, she visited the Mountbattens at Broadlands in 1942. Another good friend was Alice de Janzé, first met in Paris in 1921. Paula became a lifelong friend of Cecil Beaton, who in The Glass of Fashion (1954) documented her appearance. The 1928 portrait of Paula Gellibrand, Marquise de Casa Maury by Beaton sold at Christie's for £1,375 in 2017.

Paula visited the Mountbattens in India in 1948, in a house party including Malcolm Sargent and his wife. She kept in touch with Edwina, and visited them again at Classiebawn Castle in Ireland in 1955.

== Works ==
In 1936, together with her husband William Allen, Paula wrote Strange Coast, a novel of romance and adventure set in "the Meskhian Republic" — a fictionalized Georgia of the 1920s, published under the pseudonym "Liam Pawle".

== Personal life ==
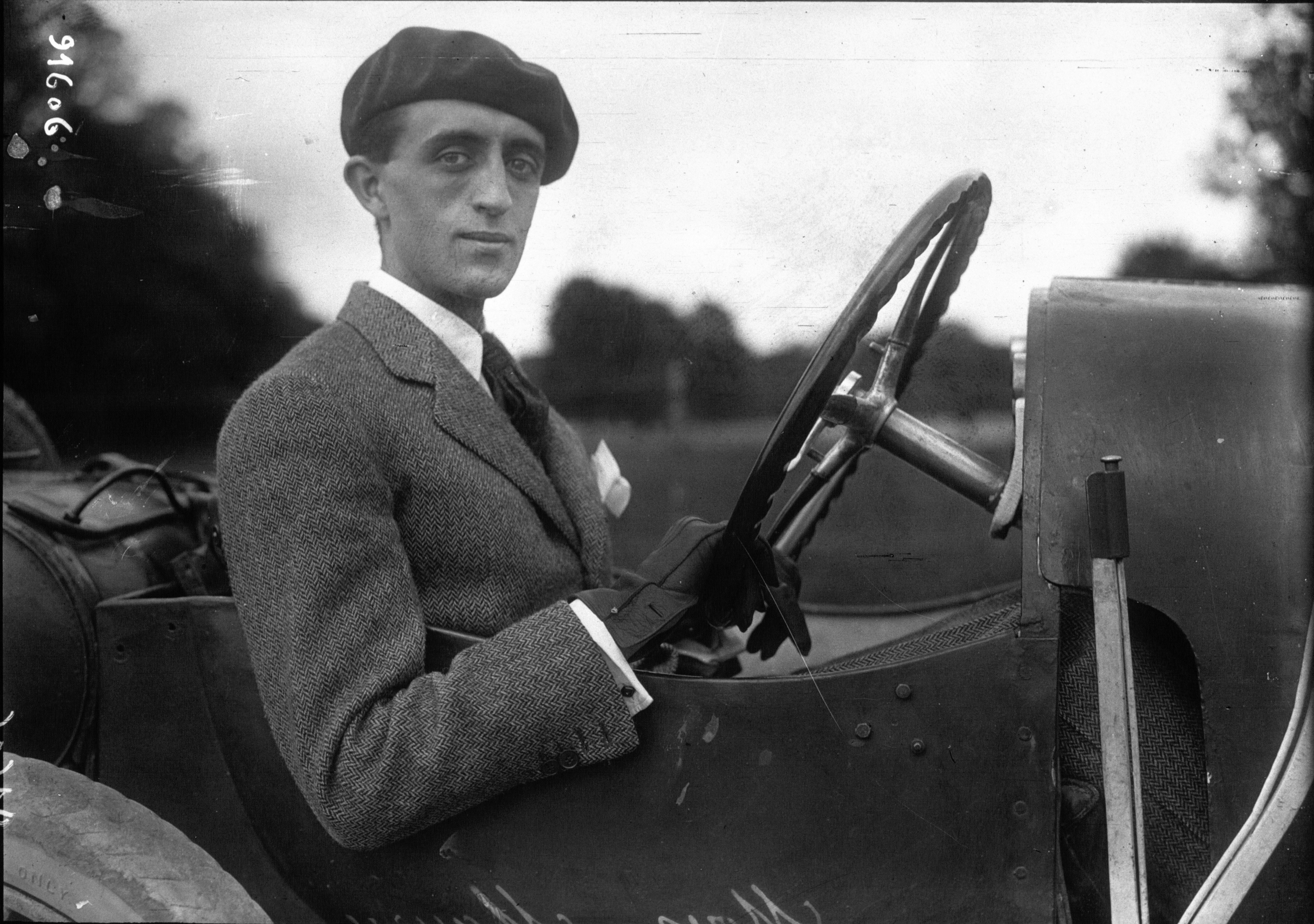
Photograph of her first husband, Pedro, in his Bugatti, 1921

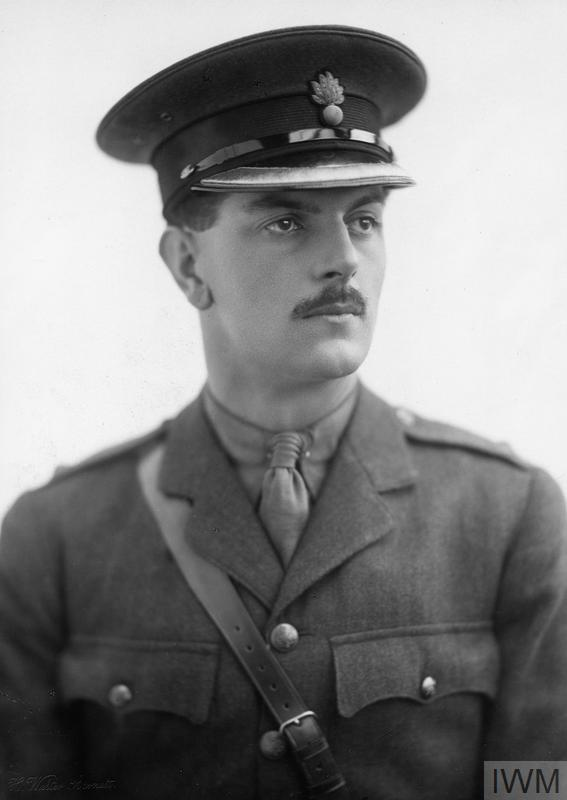
Photograph of her third husband, Ernest Caswell Long

Paula Gellibrand married three times. Before her first marriage, however, she had an affair with Freddie Guest, who commissioned the Augustus John double portrait entitled Portrait of Baronne Baba d'Erlanger and Miss Paula Gellibrand.

In 1923 in Marylebone, she married Pedro José Isidro Manuel Ricardo Monés, Marquis de Casa Maury (1896–1968), a Wing Commander, intelligence officer and founder of Curzon Cinemas. Beaton remembers that when she married she was "dressed as a nun with scarlet finger nails". They divorced and he later changed his name to Peter de Casa Maury and married Winifred May "Freda" (née Birkin) Dudley Ward in 1937. In 1954, they too divorced.

=== Second marriage ===
Paula remarried in 1932 in Watford to William Edward David Allen, the son of William Edward Allen and Sarah Collett (née Phinn) Allen. They divorced in 1939 and he became MP for Belfast West from 1929 to 1931 before marrying his third wife, Nathalie Maximovna, in 1943.

In 1942, her sister Nada Ruffer divorced from Iva Patcevitch, the Head of Condé Nast. Beaton said that she was "a very pleasing exaggeration of her [Gellibrand] painted by any Parisian fashion-artist. She is taller, thinner, her nose is more pointed and her eyelashes are longer, her hands more claw-like, her hair more sleek; she is even more exaggeratedly chic."

=== Third marriage ===
Her third, and final, marriage was to Capt. Ernest Caswell "Boy" Long (1892–1950), a rancher at Elementaita, Kenya, who died in Nairobi in 1950. He had previously been married to Mary Millicent Erskine-Wemyss (a sister of Michael Erskine-Wemyss). Paula's 1939 uncontested divorce from Allen cited him as Major Ernest Caswell Long, met on Paula's 1938 visit to East Africa, when she stayed with Alice de Janzé among the Happy Valley set.

== In literature ==
The 1924 novel Serena Blandish by Enid Bagnold was based on Paula Gellibrand's early life, Bagnold being a Kensington neighbour at 29 Hyde Park Gate. It also had a character based on Baroness Catherine d'Erlanger, who introduced Paula to society. It was put on the stage by S. N. Behrman in 1929 at the Morosco Theatre, with Ruth Gordon playing the title role.
