= Pedro Monés, Marquess of Casa Maury =

Spanish noble (1896–1968)

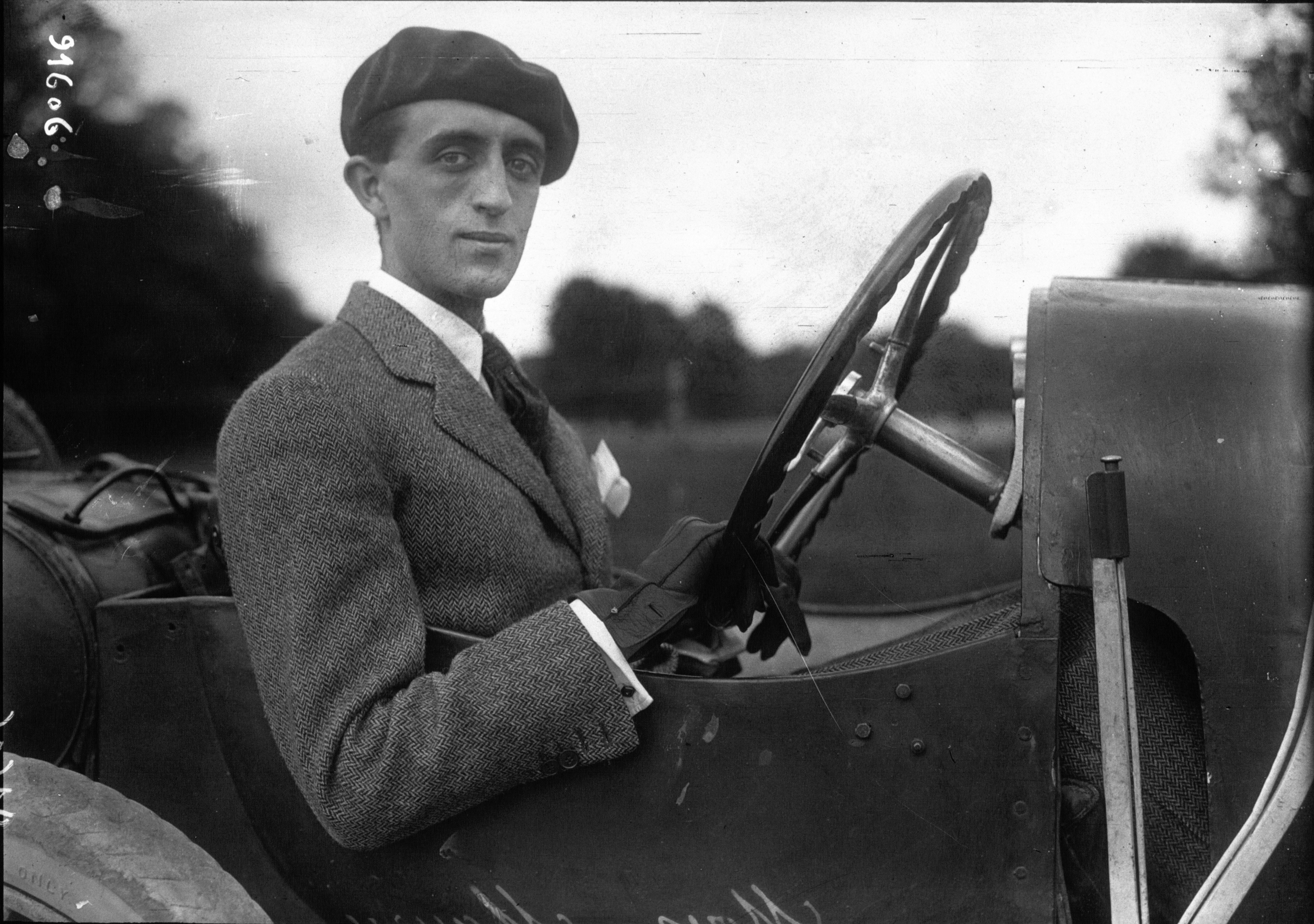
Photograph of Monés in his Bugatti, 1921

Wing Commander Don Pedro José Isidro Manuel Ricardo Monés y Maury, styled Marquess of Casa Maury (14 March 1896 – 27 June 1968) was a Cuban-born racecar driver, British Army officer and theatre impresario.

== Early life ==
Monés, who was known as Bobby, was born in Cuba, then an administrative district of the Spanish Empire, on 14 March 1896. He was the son of Pedro José de Jesús Monés y Maury, Marquess of Casa Maury (b. 1848), (Note: His father, Pedro José Monés, was converted into a Marquis (non-hereditary) on 8 April 1897 by designation of his sanctity by Pope Leo XIII. Later King Alfonso XIII authorised use of the title in Spain by Royal order of 21 June 1897.) and Maria Luisa de Montalbán. His sister, Gloria Monés-Maury, was the second wife of René Nagelmackers. (Note: René Nagelmackers (1878–1929), the son of Belgian civil engineer Georges Nagelmackers, who founded the Compagnie Internationale des Wagons-Lits, was previously married to, and widowed from, Alice Helen Dalziel (1876–1910), the only child of Davison Dalziel, 1st Baron Dalziel of Wooler).)

His father, Pedro, and uncle, Agustín Monés y Maury, were the both sons of Pedro Monés y Vals de la Paisa, would inherit the businesses of Monés & Brother (Monés y Hermano), reorganising the company in 1880 under the name Monés & Company (Monés y Compañía) with his father was in charge of managing the firm's commercial and industrial interests. Among their ventures was a large banana business which they supplied to the Atlantic Fruit Company. His father was also a politician who served as an alderman in 1878 (when he was only 30 years old) and as Mayor of Baracoa from 1880 to 1883. In 1894, before the Cuban War of Independence began, his father transferred a number of his properties in Baracoa to the Barcelona merchant José Simón González. His aunt, Adolfina Monés y Maury, was the first wife of General Ricardo Campos Carreras. His paternal grandmother, Dolores Maury Parés, the widow of Pedro Monés y Vals de la Paisa, commissioned master builder Josep Artigas Planes to build Maury-Parés House in Barcelona as a family property. The building, completed in 1882, was never occupied by his grandmother or the members of his family.

== Career ==
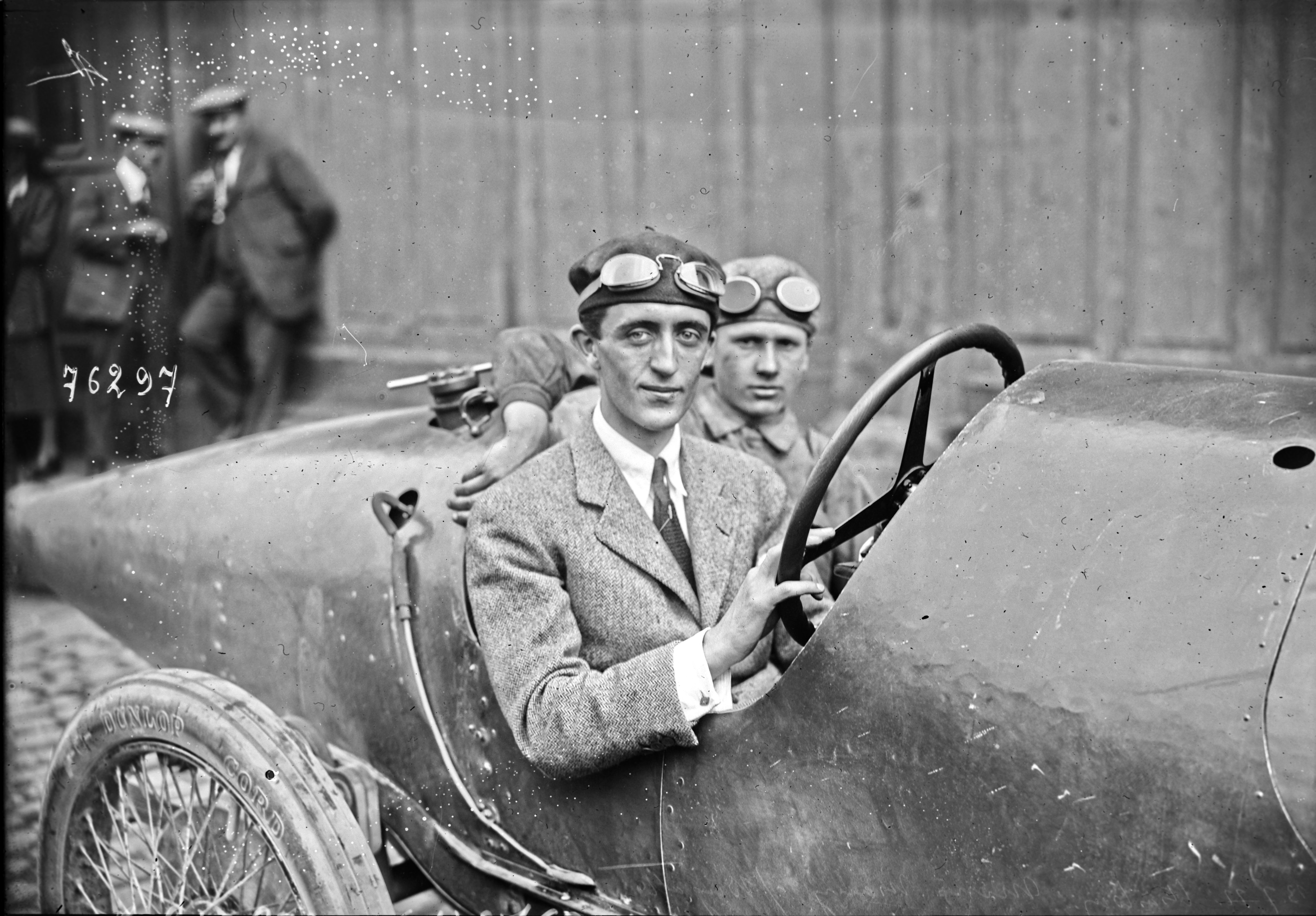
Monés in his Bugatti T30 at the 1922 French Grand Prix at Strasbourg

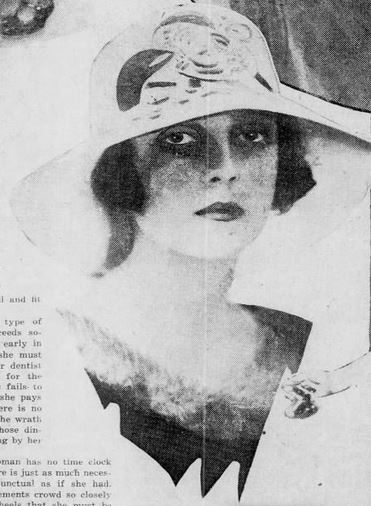
Photograph of his first wife, Paula

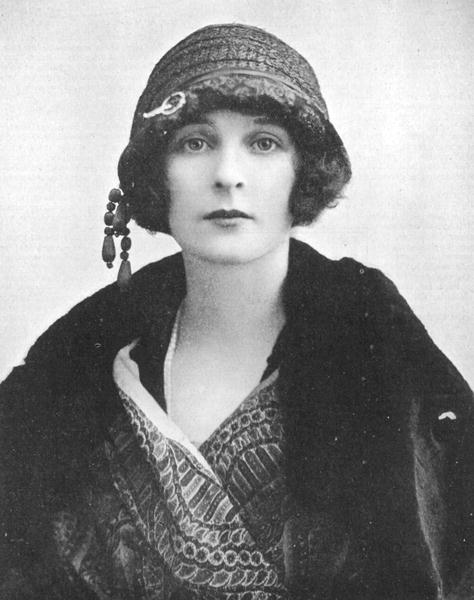
Photograph of his second wife, Freda, 1919

During his early career as a racing driver he drove one a Bugatti T30 in the 1922 French Grand Prix at Strasbourg, where he placed fifth.

=== Military career ===
During World War I, he was a Lieutenant in the Royal Flying Corps and "the only Cuban in the British Army".

Monés served as a Wing Commander in the Air Transport Auxiliary of the British Army during World War II. After being invalided out, he served as an intelligence officer who was made head of Combined Operations Headquarters's Intelligence Section by his friend, Lord Louis Mountbatten. He was involved in the Bruneval raid (also known as Operation Biting), and the disastrous Dieppe Raid (known as Operation Jubilee), where his assessment of Dieppe was conspicuously out-of-date and inadequate for the operation's requirements.

The Chief of Combined Operations was first Admiral of the Fleet Roger Keyes from 1940 to October 1941, then Commodore Mountbatten from 1941 to September 1943 followed by Maj.-Gen. Robert Laycock from October 1943 to 1947. The Marquess resigned in March 1943 due to "the Air Ministry refusing him a third promotion in 12 months to the erosion of trust between the ex-playboy and his step son-in-law, Bob Laycock."

=== Later life ===
He was a founder and manager of Curzon Cinemas. He used the Scottish architects Burnet, Tait, and Lorne to build the Curzon cinema in Mayfair with their architect Francis Lorne as designer.

Monés became a naturalised citizen of the United Kingdom on 31 January 1963, and changed his name to Peter de Casa Maury.

== Personal life ==
In 1923 at St James's Church, Piccadilly, he was married to the English society beauty and model, Paula Gellibrand (1898–1986). Paula was a daughter of timber importer William Clarke Gellibrand, and, his second wife, Isabel Marie Dever (a daughter of James Dever). Her sister was Nadeja Gellibrand, also known as Nada Ruffer, the Vogue editor. Cecil Beaton remembers that when they married, Paula she was "dressed as a nun with scarlet finger nails".

After their divorce, she married William Edward David Allen, MP for Belfast West (who was previously married to Lady Phyllis Edith King, the daughter of the 3rd Earl of Lovelace), in 1932. They divorced in 1939 and she married Maj. Ernest Caswell Long (who was previously married to Mary Millicent Erskine-Wemyss and Genesta Mary (née Heath) Farquhar).

=== Second marriage ===
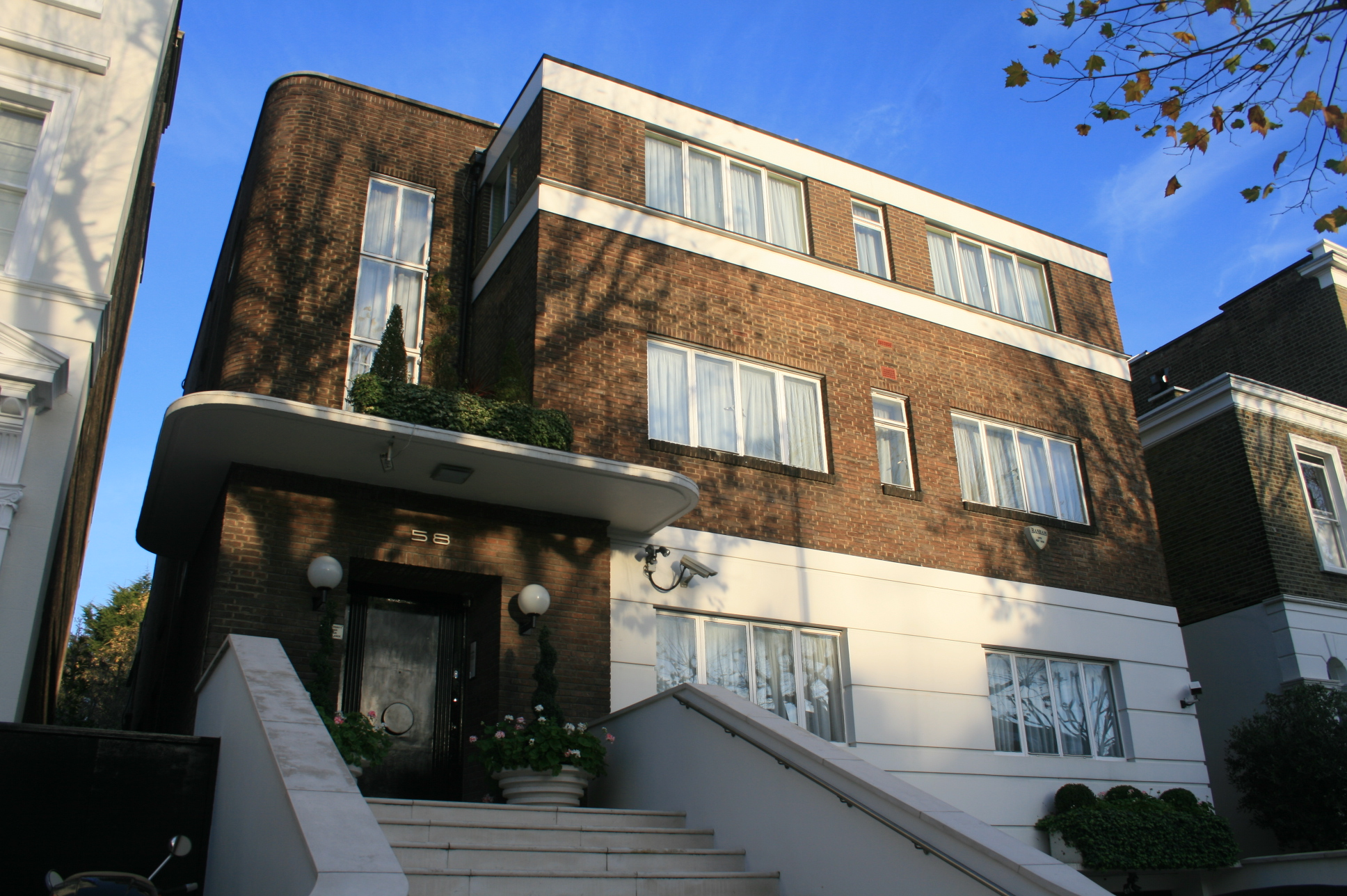
58 Hamilton Terrace

On 20 October 1937, he remarried to Winifred May "Freda" (née Birkin) Dudley Ward (1894–1983), the former wife of William Dudley Ward. (Note: Freda and William Dudley Ward, a nephew of the 1st Earl of Dudley, had divorced in 1931. From her marriage to Dudley Ward, she was the mother of Penelope, Lady Reed and Claire, Lady Laycock (wife of Sir Robert Laycock.) She was the second child and eldest of three daughters of Col. Charles Wilfred Birkin (fourth son of Sir Thomas Birkin, 1st Baronet), and his American wife, Claire Lloyd Howe. From 1918 to 1929, Freda was the mistress of Edward, Prince of Wales, until she was supplanted by American Thelma Furness (née Morgan) from 1929 to 1934; Thelma introduced Edward to Wallis Simpson.

In 1938, they had an Art Deco House built for them in St John's Wood at 58 Hamilton Terrace, Maida Vale, Westminster, London. The house, which was built on the site of two original Victorian houses, was designed by Scottish architects Burnet, Tait, and Lorne. They divorced in 1954, and neither remarried before their deaths. The Marquess was still living at 58 Hamilton Terrace by January 1963. (Note: In 1966, 58 Hamilton Terrace was sold to his second wife's niece, Belinda Blew-Jones (1921–2003), and her husband Antony Lambton, 6th Earl of Durham.) The Marchioness of Casa Maury (Marquesa de Casa Maury) died at her home in Chelsea, London in 1983.
