= Arthur Farquhar =

Arthur Farquhar may refer to:

- Sir Arthur Farquhar (Royal Navy officer, born 1772) (1772–1843), Royal Navy admiral
- Sir Arthur Farquhar (Royal Navy officer, born 1815) (1815–1908), Royal Navy admiral, son of the above
- Sir Arthur Farquhar (Royal Navy officer, born 1855) (1855–1937), Royal Navy admiral, son of the above
- Arthur Briggs Farquhar (1838–1925), American businessman

== See also ==
- A. S. L. Farquharson (Arthur Spencer Loat Farquharson, 1871–1942), British classicist and translator
