= Hubert Bond =

British psychiatrist (1870–1945)

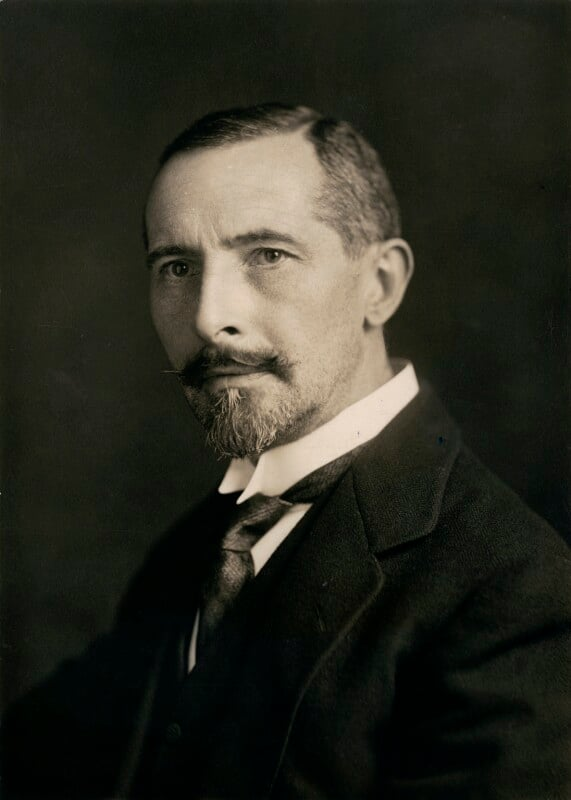
Sir Hubert Bond, c. 1923.

Sir Charles Hubert Bond KBE FRCP (6 September 1870 – 18 April 1945) was a British psychiatrist and mental health administrator.

== Early life and education ==
Bond was born in the village of Ogbourne St George, Wiltshire, the son of the Reverend Alfred Bond, the local vicar. His younger brother was Sir Reginald Bond, later medical director-general of the Royal Navy. He trained as a doctor at University of Edinburgh, graduating Bachelor of Medicine (MB) in 1892, Bachelor of Science (BSc) in Public Health in 1893, Doctor of Medicine (MD) in 1895, and Doctor of Science (DSc) that same year.

== Career ==
Bond was Gaskell Gold Medallist in Mental Disorders in 1898. He then took a post at Morningside Asylum in Edinburgh, before transferring to posts at Wakefield Asylum and Banstead Asylum and then as first deputy medical superintendent of Bexley Asylum. In 1903 he was appointed first medical superintendent of Ewell Colony for Epileptics in Surrey and in 1907 he became first medical superintendent of Long Grove Asylum.

He was appointed a Commissioner in Lunacy in 1912 and a commissioner at the new Board of Control for Lunacy and Mental Deficiency in 1914, remaining there until his retirement less than a month before his death in 1945. In 1930 he became one of the four senior commissioners on the board.

Bond favoured voluntary admission to mental hospitals rather than certification, reforms finally introduced in the Mental Treatment Act 1930. In 1924 he and another doctor were sued by a patient for wrongful detention. The jury found for the plaintiff and awarded him the huge sum of £25,000 damages. The Court of Appeal set the verdict aside and ordered a retrial (later confirmed by the House of Lords), but the plaintiff eventually settled out of court for £250 damages. This contributed to changes in the law in the 1930 act. Bond was also a lecturer in mental disorders at the Maudsley Hospital from 1919 to 1939, lecturing to trainee psychiatrists on mental illness and the law.

He was honorary general secretary of the Royal Medico-Psychological Association from 1906 to 1912 (and president from 1921 to 1922), a member of the War Office Shell-Shock Committee from 1920 to 1922, chairman of the Departmental Committee on Nursing in County and Borough Mental Hospitals from 1922 to 1924, president of the Association of Occupational Therapists from 1937 until his death, vice-president of the Lebanon Hospital from 1937 until his death, and a member of the Central Medical War Committee from 1939 until his death.

He was a consultant in neurology and mental disorders to the Royal Navy from 1925 until his death. In both world wars he worked on adapting mental hospitals for military use and for this work in the First World War he was appointed Commander of the Order of the British Empire (CBE) in January 1920. He was appointed Knight Commander of the Order of the British Empire (KBE) in 1929.

== Personal life ==
On 12 May 1900, Bond married Janet Constance Laurie; they had one daughter. They lived in St Annes, Lancashire. From 1925 until his death he lived at 10 Portland Place, Brighton.
