= Baba d'Erlanger =

French fashion stylist and model

- Princess Jean-Louis de Faucigny-Lucinge
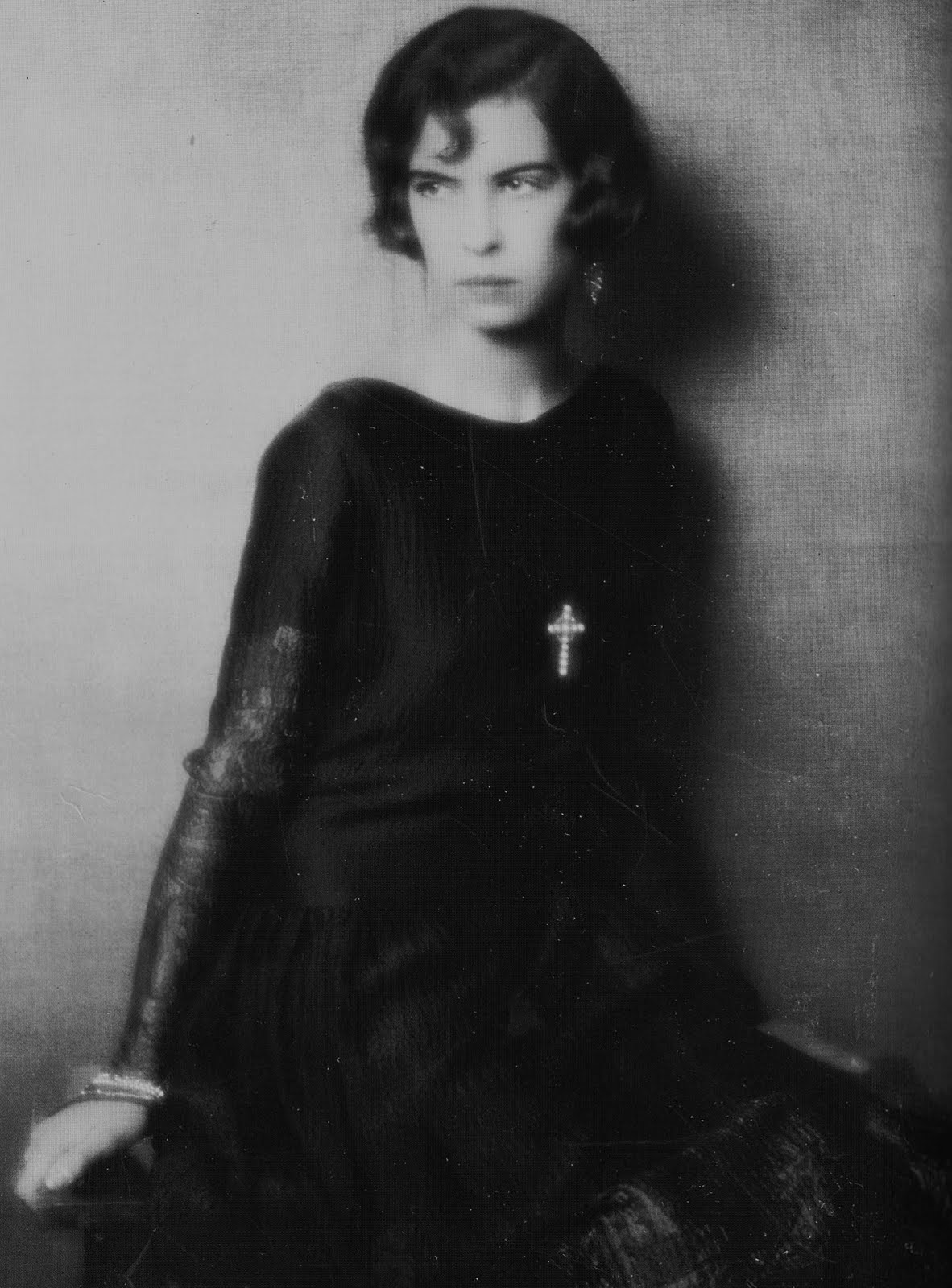
- Born: Marie Liliane Matilde d'Erlanger; 1901
- Died: 1945 (aged 43–44)
- Spouse: Prince Jean-Louis de Faucigny-Lucinge
- Issue: Princess Catherine Emilie Ratisbonne De Ravenel; Princess Ariel Marie Roberte de Faucigny-Lucinge
- House: Faucigny
- Father: Baron Emile Beaumont d'Erlanger
- Mother: Marie-Rose Antoinette Catherine de Robert d'Acquéria de Rochegude
- Occupation: Model; fashion stylist

Baroness Marie Liliane Matilda d'Erlanger, later Princess Jean-Louis de Faucigny-Lucinge (1901–1945), nicknamed "Baba", together with Paula Gellibrand, "the Gellibrand", were known as "The Twins" and became Cecil Beaton's models. Baba was also the Gellibrand's fashion stylist and she is considered a style icon of the 1920s.

== Biography ==
Marie Liliane Matilda, Baroness d'Erlanger, was born in 1901, the daughter of Baron Emile Beaumont d'Erlanger and Marie-Rose Antoinette Catherine de Robert d'Acquéria de Rochegude. Her siblings were: Robert "Robin" Emile Frédéric d'Erlanger Regis; Sir Gerard John Regis Leo d´Erlanger; and Bianca d'Erlanger. Born in France, she was educated in England.

She became a lifelong friend of Paula Gellibrand, "the Gellibrand", who became Cecil Beaton's favorite model. Baba became her fashion stylist and they were so inseparable that became known as "The Twins". In 1919 Augustus John painted the portrait Portrait of Baronne Baba d'Erlanger (1901–1945) and Miss Paula Gellibrand (1898–1964). It was commissioned by Freddie Guest, Winston Churchill's cousin, who, at the time, had an affair with Gellibrand. In March 1923 she was the bridesmaid to Gellibrand when she married the Marques de Casa Maury.

On 14 November 1923 Baba married Prince Jean-Louis de Faucigny-Lucinge, a French aristocrat, descendant of Louis IX of France. She is the mother of Isabel Catherine Emilie Ratisbonne De Ravenel (b. 1925); Ariel Marie Roberte de Faucigny-Lucinge (b. 1926); Prince de Faucigny-Lucinge. Baba, Princesse de Faucigny-Lucinge, and her husband were patrons of José Maria Sert, Salvador Dalí and Man Ray. Baba's friend of this time was Natalie Paley, cousin of Tsar Nicholas II of Russia and wife of the couturier Lucien Lelong, and Baba became a model for him. About Baba, Cecil Beaton said "Baba d'Erlanger-Lucinge was the first to bring into fashion the exotic, simian grace of the jungle and thereby created an astonishing effect of originality".
