= Pavel Muratov =

Russian writer (1881–1950)

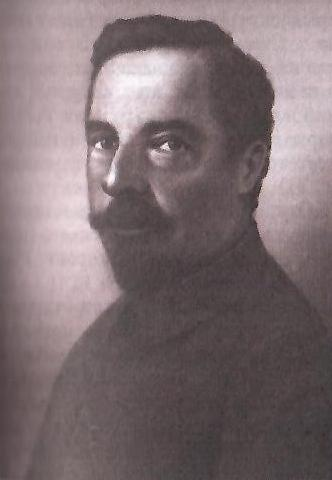
Muratov in 1910

Pavel Pavlovich Muratov (Russian: Па́вел Па́влович Мура́тов; 3 March [O.S. 19 February] 1881 – February 5, 1950), also known as Paul Muratov or Paul Muratoff, was a Russian essayist, novelist, art historian, critic and playwright.

Born in Bobrov in the Voronezh Oblast into the family of a military doctor, Muratov attended a Cadet Corps and graduated from the Petersburg State Transport University in 1903. He traveled abroad in 1905-06, after which he moved to Moscow and worked at the Rumyantsev Museum until 1914. He became friends with the writers Boris Zaytsev, Vladislav Khodasevich, and Nina Berberova (who called him "one of the most remarkable men I ever met"), as well as the artist Nikolai Ulyanov. From 1906 he began to publish in journals like Vesy, Zolotoe Runo, and Apollon. He collaborated with Igor Grabar on the latter's History of Russian Art, and in 1913-14 he helped publish the journal Sofia, dedicated to early Russian art.

He was a volunteer with the Field Artillery in the Russo-Japanese War. In the First World War he rejoined the artillery, and in 1914-15 was second in command of a field battery. Later he was on air defence and staff work with the Black Sea Fleet HQ at Sevastopol.

In 1921 he was arrested in connection with his work for Pomgol; the next year he left Russia never to return. At first he lived in Germany, but in 1923 he moved to Rome, where almost all the local Russian intelligentsia visited his Tuesday salons. In 1927 he moved to Paris, where he contributed to emigre journals and became an art expert for the gallery A la vieille Russie. In 1939 he emigrated to England, from 1940 living in London; in 1946 he moved to Whitechurch House, his friend WED Allen's estate in Ireland.

On October 5, 1950, he died of a heart attack at Whitechurch House and was buried at the local cemetery.

Clive James has called Muratov an example of "just how brilliant somebody can be and still be a forgotten man," and called his book Obrazy italii (Images of Italy) (in three volumes, published in 1911, 1912, and 1924) "one of the most dazzling books of its type ever written. As a book on the Italian Grand Tour it not only stands directly in the tradition of Goethe, Gregorovius, Burckhardt and Arthur Symons, but it is better than any of them."

== Military works (as Paul Muratoff, with W. E. D. Allen) ==
- The Russian Campaigns of 1941–1943 (1944, Penguin)
- The Russian Campaigns of 1944–45 (1946, Penguin)
- Caucasian Battlefields (1953)

== Bibliography ==
- Lencek, Lena M. (2015), "The Venetian Mirror: Pavel Pavlovich Muratov's "Obrazy Italii" (1924) and the Literature of Art", Znanie. Ponimanie. Umenie, 12 (1): 344–358, doi:10.17805/zpu.2015.1.35, archived (PDF) from the original on 22 November 2015.
