= Cuthbert Heath =

British insurance businessman

Cuthbert Eden Heath OBE, DL (23 March 1859 – 8 March 1939) was a British insurance businessman, underwriter, broker, and syndicate owner at Lloyd's of London from 1880 until 1939. He was involved in the development of non-marine insurance at Lloyd's and has been described in insurance histories as "the father of modern", "the maker of modern Lloyd's", and "the father of non-marine insurance at Lloyd's". His work contributed to Lloyd's expansion beyond marine insurance into general and specialty-risk insurance.

Heath is known for originating the following forms of insurance: burglary, jeweller's block, all-risks policies, loss-of-profits after fire, bankers' blanket bond, credit-risk, employer's liability, workmen's compensation, smallpox-if-vaccinated, excess-of-loss, air-raid, earthquake, and hurricane. He did pioneering and detailed research and risk-assessment for insurance he originated, in particular for earthquake and hurricane probability.

He also cemented Lloyd's reputation in the U.S. and worldwide by his immediate response to the devastating 1906 San Francisco earthquake and fire: "Pay all of our policyholders in full, irrespective of the terms of their policies." In addition, he originated the solvency audit for members of Lloyd's syndicates, which became mandatory at the company.

Heath engaged in numerous civilian services during World War I, including giving his mansion Anstie Grange to the War Office for use as an officer's hospital, for which he was appointed an OBE.

== Early life and education ==
Cuthbert Heath was born in 1859 in Forest Lodge near Southampton, England. He was the fourth of seven children of Captain Leopold Heath, a Royal Navy officer who achieved the rank of Vice Admiral, became the Commander-in-Chief, East Indies, and was appointed a Knight Commander of the Order of the Bath (KCB). In childhood Cuthbert contracted partial deafness, which prevented him from joining the military as three of his four brothers did.

Heath was tutored privately until the age of eight, and then attended Temple Grove School in East Sheen. He attended Brighton College through 1874, and afterwards, beginning at the age of 16, spent a year in France and a nearly year in Germany, learning French and German.

== Career ==
=== Entry at Lloyd's and early innovations 1878–1905 ===
In 1878, at the age of 18, Heath became a clerk at Henry Head & Co., a firm of brokers and underwriters at Lloyd's of London. In 1880, at the age of 21, he was elected an underwriting member of Lloyd's, with the backing of a £7,000 deposit provided by his father, and he began underwriting for himself two years later, in 1882.

Lloyd's at the time was a marine insurance-only insurer, so Heath was a marine underwriter at first. In 1885 he reinsured Hand in Hand Fire & Life Insurance Society's fire risks, thereby reviving fire insurance at Lloyd's, which had previously been discontinued due to high taxation rates. He started Lloyd's first specifically non-marine syndicate at Lloyd's in 1885. Heath thereafter became renowned for increasing, and innovating in, Lloyd's non-marine insurance business, which eventually resulted in changing the face of Lloyd's forever.

Heath's innovations in the insurance industry began in the late 1880s. By 1889 someone insuring a house for fire had asked Heath if he could also insure it for burglary, which had never been done before. Heath's reply was reportedly a now-famous "Why not?", which became his motto going forward; his principle was "Any risk is insurable at the right price." Around the same time he also began insuring the diamond market, resulting in his creating a "jeweller's block" policy for merchants that covered jewels in transit and on the premises, and an "all risks" jewellery policy for consumers that covered loss or theft.

In the late 1880s Heath also invented and offered insurance for loss of profits after a fire, also known as business interruption insurance. This controversial move created a major uproar, and he was summoned by the Chairman of Lloyd's Fire Offices Committee and asked why he was "ruining fire insurance". Heath ignored the controversy.

In 1890, in order to increase his business Heath established a firm of insurance brokers, C. E. Heath & Co., which became a substantial independent broking firm with considerable overseas business. In 1890 Heath also wrote the first American risk ever in Lloyd's non-marine market. In 1895 he wrote the first earthquake insurance policy in the U.S. Heath also invented bankers' blanket bond insurance.

Heath was the first Lloyd's underwriter to accumulate detailed probability-of-loss statistics, becoming a specialist in the risks he undertook. In order to price catastrophe insurance, he initially collected maps of 100 years of hurricane paths in the West Indies, and made detailed notes in a little black rating book which acquired renown. He did the same for earthquakes, paying to have maps created of past earthquakes in India, and finding records of past earthquakes in South America, China, and the West Indies. He also lent his black book to competitors so they would not naively undercut his rates.

In the 1890s Heath also developed credit risk insurance, with the stipulation that the insured had to bear some part of the risk in order to insure prudence and due diligence on the part of the creditor. He established the "8 Principles of Credit Insurance", became the first Chairman of the Trade Indemnity Company, and founded the Credit Insurance Association. He also pioneered employer's liability insurance and workers' compensation insurance.

In 1894, faced with a need for greater capacity for his non-marine insurance business, Heath established the Excess Insurance Company. With an initial capitalisation of £5,000, it was used as a reinsurance backing for his syndicate. The original stated purpose of the firm was "to write marine, fire and accident [liability] business and reinsurance".

During the 1901–1902 smallpox epidemic in London, he pioneered smallpox insurance, reducing the premium by 75% if the individual was vaccinated.

Prior to the 20th century Lloyd's only secured its marine insurance risks. In 1902 Heath finally persuaded Lloyd's to require security deposits for non-marine business as well; this was implemented in 1903. Heath was also the first to introduce the idea of an audit at Lloyd's; because of the dearth of security for non-marine risks, he required a strict audit of the members of his syndicate, beginning in 1903.

=== 1906 San Francisco earthquake and aftermath ===
On 18 April 1906 a major earthquake hit San Francisco, and the resulting fires destroyed over 80% of the city, killed thousands of people, and left half of the population homeless. Misled by local propaganda as to earthquake likelihood, few residents of San Francisco had bought earthquake insurance, but they had bought fire insurance. In the wake of the devastating fires following the earthquake, many insurance companies fought paying their policyholders, often by quibbling over causality (since the insurance was not for earthquakes), or paying only 75% of the amounts due. This led to many lawsuits from policyholders. At least 14 insurers went bankrupt, and some insurers – mostly German and Austrian – simply disappeared and denied all coverage.

Heath and his syndicate had insured aggressively in San Francisco, covering about 20% of the total policyholders there. Nevertheless he immediately cabled his San Francisco agent a now-legendary instruction:

Pay all of our policyholders in full, irrespective of the terms of their policies.

Lloyd's paid out a staggering $50 million, the equivalent of more than $1 billion in 2010 currency. Heath's action, however, cemented Lloyd's reputation in the U.S. as an insurer that promptly and fully paid all valid claims, and led to a great increase in Lloyd's business there and eventually elsewhere as well. The United States soon became Lloyd's largest market.

The catastrophe came at a difficult time for the insurance industry, as the preceding years had left many insurers reeling from several other costly disasters, including the 1903 Chicago fire in the Iroquois Theatre which killed 600 people, the 1904 fire on the steamship General Slocum in Manhattan's East River which killed 1,021 people, and the 1904 Great Baltimore Fire which caused losses of $90 million. Additionally, a few months after the San Francisco earthquake and fires there were further catastrophic earthquakes and fires in Valparaiso, Chile and in Kingston, Jamaica.

By 1907 Heath therefore devised excess-of-loss reinsurance, to provide insurers with the protection they needed against catastrophe losses like the San Francisco claims. These reinsurance policies paid out only when the loss was above a certain threshold, and put a cap on payments; they also involved layering and retrocession, thereby inventing vertical reinsurance.

An additional consequence of the San Francisco earthquake and fire was that in 1908 Lloyd's as a whole adopted Heath's model of a strict and compulsory annual audit of all members' accounts. All underwriters were required to provide certificates of solvency from approved auditors, and premiums were held in trust accounts for the payment of claims. These practices became the cornerstone of Lloyd's solidity for the rest of the 20th century.

=== Subsequent career 1907–1939 ===
Heath sold the first Lloyd's auto insurance policy in 1907, for American drivers and their cars. In 1912 he sold the first fleet coverage, to a meat-packing company in Chicago.

In 1911 he was elected to Lloyd's Committee, its governing body, and served on it through 1915. Also in 1911, non-marine insurance at Lloyd's, which he had initiated and so greatly expanded, was given official legal recognition and status, via the parliamentary Lloyd's Act 1911. In December 1911 The Times wrote of him, summarizing his achievements:

Mr Heath is head of CE Heath and Co, brokers and underwriters, and a director of the Excess Insurance Company, the Fine Arts and General Insurance Company, and of John Broadwood & Sons. He was the pioneer of Lloyd's fire business, and practically all the miscellaneous classes of insurance. While he has been a leader in what may be decided as the most hazardous risks, he has consistently pressed for safeguarding further the financial security of Lloyd's members.

During the First World War (1914–1918), Heath engaged in a considerable number of civilian service activities, including donating his mansion for use as a military hospital, for which he was awarded an OBE. Business-wise, in 1915, following Zeppelin attacks on London, he estimated the number of Zeppelins, the frequency of attacks, the number of bombs each Zeppelin could carry, the damage area of an explosion, and how much of London was built up as opposed to open spaces. After calculating his risks he offered bomb insurance through the end of the war, raising and lowering his premiums with the intensity of the attacks.

In 1919 Heath ventured into aviation insurance, and started the British Aviation Insurance Association. Also by 1919, he was noted as "the leader among the Lloyd's underwriters", with his finger on the pulse of the insurance public.

During the 1920s Heath withdrew from daily business at Lloyd's, but his syndicate continued to lead the non-marine market. By the 1930s his annual income was estimated to be £60,000 (equivalent to £3,390,809 in 2025), and his syndicate was underwriting for 300 members.

== Civilian services during the war ==
At the outbreak of the First World War in 1914, Heath and his wife were living at Anstie Grange, their 26-room mansion in Surrey that was host to shooting parties, hunts, and balls. Heath immediately began recruiting, speaking at recruitment meetings, giving pep talks at Anstie Grange to local men who volunteered, and setting up a recruitment office at Lloyd's where volunteers could be sworn in. In 1915 he was appointed a Trustee of Lloyd's Patriotic Fund, which assists soldiers and sailors in distress and the widows and children of those who have died during military service.

As his indoor staff enlisted in the war effort at his encouragement, their number was reduced from 26 to three. He allowed the local rifle club to use his rifle range and supplied them with ammunition, and allowed the London Civil Service Rifles to drill on his grounds.

Heath was commissioned, along with Frederick Huth Jackson, Roger Owen, and two others, to create a scheme by which the government could insure the public against losses caused by bombing. The plan was adopted, and he served on the committee that carried it out until the end of the war.

In September 1916, Heath gave his mansion Anstie Grange to the War Office for use as an officer's hospital. The Anstie Grange Officer's Hospital, also known as the Holmwood Hospital for Officers, was funded by Heath and fully outfitted with the most modern appliances.

Dorothy Gore-Brown, a cousin of Heath's wife, was appointed Commandant of the hospital, and his daughter Genesta served as its pantry maid. It became a first-line hospital, receiving patients straight from the Western Front. The surgeons and staff totaled 50, and it housed 50 patients at a time; nearly 700 patients passed through the hospital from October 1916 to its closure in December 1918. It gained a reputation as one of the best hospitals in England.

In 1919 Heath joined the Committee of the Labour Department, which allotted funds to enable soldiers and sailors, both officers and enlisted men, to be trained for civil employment.

As the donor and organiser of the Anstie Grange Primary Hospital for Officers, Heath was appointed Officer of the Most Excellent Order of the British Empire (OBE) in the 1920 New Year Honours, for civilian services in connection with the war. In July 1920 he also received a certificate of appreciation from Winston Churchill to hang in Anstie Grange, and an accompanying letter, in acknowledgement of the Army Council's gratitude.

== Honours ==
- Elected a Fellow of the Zoological Society of London (1904)
- Officer of the Most Excellent Order of the British Empire, for civilian services in connection with the war (1920)
- Knight of Grace of the Order of St John of Jerusalem (1925)
- High Sheriff of Surrey (1925–1926)
- Deputy Lieutenant for the County of Surrey (1928)

== Personal life ==
In 1886, Henry John Tschudi Broadwood, scion of the founder of John Broadwood & Sons, married Heath's sister Ada. Heath generously aided the struggling piano company, with both business advice and funds, and in 1902 became its Chairman.

In 1891 Heath married Sarah Caroline Gore Gambier (1859–1944). They had two children, Leopold Cuthbert Heath (1894–1966), and Genesta Mary Heath (1899–1990), who married Ernest Caswell Long.

Upon the death of his uncle Douglas Heath in 1897, he took Kitlands, a small estate near Coldharbour, Surrey, on lease from his father, who had succeeded to the estate. During that time he also had a residence in London at 47 Portman Square.

Upon the death of his father in 1907, Heath inherited his large country retirement estate Anstie Grange, near Dorking, Surrey, and moved there with his wife and two children. Anstie Grange, between Holmwood and Coldharbour, was a 26-bedroom mansion which had been purchased and remodeled by Heath's father in 1863. It had a staff of 50, including 26 indoor staff plus gardeners, stablemen, chauffeurs, and gamekeepers. Heath's wife entertained lavishly, hosting shooting parties, hunts, balls, and other gatherings for London's social élite. Heath also maintained a London residence at 15 Aldford Street in Mayfair.

In 1929 he donated 200 acres near Leith Hill, Surrey to the National Trust for conservation.

Heath enjoyed fishing, shooting, and hunting. He funded Surrey Union Foxhounds during the war, and in 1918 he became its joint master. He was a member of several gentlemen's clubs in London, including the Sesame Club, the Windham Club, Boodle's, the City of London Club, the Ranelagh Club, and the Royal Automobile Club. In 1910 he was elected to membership of the Royal Yacht Squadron, and in later years often sailed his yacht in winter in the Mediterranean. In 1930 he purchased a small estate, La Domaine de Savaric, in Èze in the Alpes-Maritimes, France. His pastimes also included country walks, reading, and water colour painting.

In 1938 Heath suffered a stroke, which left him partially paralysed. He died at Anstie Grange in March 1939. His memorial service was attended by almost every major financial figure in London, and letters of condolence poured in from the U.S. and all over the world. In its memorial tribute, The Economist called him "the first man to see the potentialities of insurance in the modern world"; it continued: "There are few departments of our modern life, which have not been touched at this point or that by his inventive genius. He had in him every element of greatness – intellect, character, vision, courage and a deep personal humility."
