= Robert Caldwell (academic) =

Robert Townley Caldwell
- Born: 16 March 1843; Bridgetown, Barbados
- Died: 8 September 1914 (aged 71); Inneshewen, Dess, Aberdeenshire, Scotland
- Education: University of Cambridge
- Spouses: Ellen Philippa Mary Farquhar (m. 1883)
- Parents: William Bletterman Caldwell (father); Elizabeth Townley (mother)
- Relatives: Sir Arthur Farquhar (father-in-law); Sir Arthur Murray Farquhar (brother-in-law); Abraham Faure (uncle); Egbert Bletterman (great-uncle)
- Scientific career
- Fields: Mathematics
- Workplaces: University of Cambridge

Robert Townley Caldwell (16 March 1843 – 8 September 1914) was the Master of Corpus Christi College, Cambridge from 1906 to 1914.

== Biography ==
Born in Barbados on 16 March 1843, he was educated at St John's College, Winnipeg, King's College, London and Corpus Christi College, Cambridge, where he graduated B.A. as 10th wrangler in 1865.

Elected a Fellow of Corpus Christi in 1865, he spent the rest of his working life there serving as a Mathematical Lecturer, Bursar and finally Master until his death on 8 September 1914. He was an active Cambridgeshire Freemason, from his initiation into Isaac Newton University Lodge rising to be Provincial Grand Master.

== Notes ==
Academic offices
| Preceded by Edward Henry Perowne | Master of Corpus Christi College, Cambridge; 1906–1914 | Succeeded by Edmund Courtenay Pearce |
