= HMS Diana (1895) =

Eclipse-class cruiser

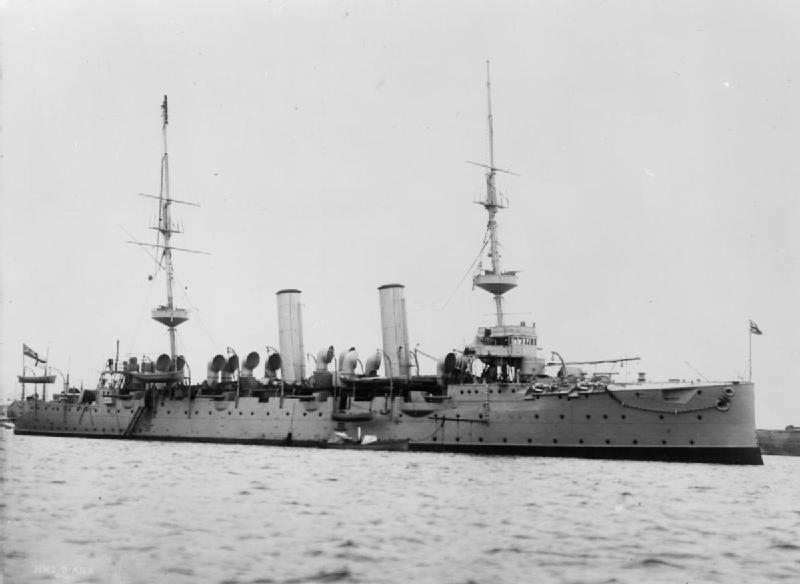
- Diana at anchor during World War I

History

United Kingdom
- Name: HMS Diana
- Namesake: Diana
- Builder: Fairfield Shipbuilding & Engineering, Govan
- Laid down: 13 August 1894
- Launched: 5 December 1895
- Completed: 15 June 1897
- Fate: Sold for scrap, 1 July 1920

General characteristics
- Class & type: Eclipse-class protected cruiser
- Displacement: 5,600 long tons (5,690 t)
- Length: 350 ft (106.7 m)
- Beam: 53 ft 6 in (16.3 m)
- Draught: 20 ft 6 in (6.25 m)
- Installed power: 9,600 ihp (7,200 kW); 8 cylindrical boilers
- Propulsion: 2 shafts, 2 Inverted triple-expansion steam engines
- Speed: 18.5 knots (34.3 km/h; 21.3 mph)
- Complement: 450
- Armament: As built: 5 × QF 6-inch (152 mm) guns; 6 × QF 4.7-inch (120 mm) guns; 6 × 3-pounder QF guns; 3 × 18-inch torpedo tubes; After 1905: 11 × six-inch QF guns; 9 × 76 mm (3.0 in) QF guns; 7 × 3-pounder QF guns; 3 × 18-inch torpedo tubes
- Armour: Gun shields: 3 in (76 mm); Engine hatch: 6 in (152 mm); Decks: 1.5–3 in (38–76 mm); Conning tower: 6 in (152 mm)

HMS Diana was an Eclipse-class protected cruiser built for the Royal Navy in the mid-1890s.

== Service history ==
She was commissioned at Chatham on 16 February 1900 to take out reliefs for HMS Ringarooma, HMS Boomerang and HMS Torch serving on the Australia Station, and left Plymouth two weeks later on 27 February 1900. Stopping in Gibraltar, Malta, Aden and Colombo on her way out, she arrived in Australia in April where she stopped at Albany, Western Australia before heading to Sydney.

The following year, she was commissioned with the complement of 450 officers and men at Chatham on 15 January 1901 to join the Mediterranean Fleet under the command of Captain Arthur Murray Farquhar. In March 1901 she was one of two cruisers to escort HMS Ophir, commissioned as royal yacht for the World tour of the Duke and Duchess of Cornwall and York (later King George V and Queen Mary), from Gibraltar to Malta, and then to Port Said. Captain Edmond Slade was appointed in command in April 1902, but Farquhar did not leave the ship until early June. In May 1902 she visited Palermo to attend festivities in connection with the opening of an Agricultural Exhibition by King Victor Emmanuel, and in August 1902 she toured the Aegean Sea, visiting Salonica and Lemnos. She was at Argostoli in early October before returning to Malta.

In late 1904 she was sent to Tangier to watch the Russian fleet that was coaling there in the aftermath of the Dogger Bank incident.
