= Arthur Farquhar (Royal Navy officer, born 1815) =

Royal Navy Admiral (1815–1908)

Admiral Sir Arthur Farquhar KCB
- Born: 9 January 1815
- Died: 29 January 1908 (aged 93)
- Spouse: Ellen Rickman (m. 1851)
- Children: Sir Arthur Murray Farquhar
- Parents: Sir Arthur Farquhar (father); Jane Murray (mother)
- Relatives: Robert Caldwell (son-in-law); William Farquhar (uncle)
- Military career
- Allegiance: United Kingdom
- Branch: Royal Navy
- Service years: 1829 – 1880
- Rank: Admiral
- Commands: HMS Albatross; HMS Malacca; HMS Victory; HMS Hannibal; HMS Hogue; HMS Lion; Pacific Station; Plymouth Command
- Conflicts: Oriental Crisis
- Awards: Knight Commander of the Order of the Bath

Admiral Sir Arthur Farquhar KCB (9 January 1815 – 29 January 1908) was a British Royal Navy officer who served as Commander-in-Chief, Plymouth.

== Naval career ==
Farquhar joined the Royal Navy in 1829. He took part in the bombardment of Acre during the Oriental Crisis in 1840.

Promoted to commander in 1844, Farquhar was given command of HMS Albatross in 1846 and fought pirates in Borneo in 1849. Promoted to captain in 1849, he commanded HMS Malacca, HMS Victory, HMS Hannibal, HMS Hogue and HMS Lion.

Farquhar was appointed Commander-in-Chief, Pacific Station in 1869 and Commander-in-Chief, Plymouth in 1878. He retired in 1880.

There is a memorial to Farquhar in Christ Church, Kincardine O'Neil.

== Family ==
In 1851 Farquhar married Ellen Rickman; the couple had nine sons and four daughters. He was an investor in the coal mines of Robert Dunsmuir.

== See also ==
- O'Byrne, William Richard (1849). "Farquhar, Arthur" . A Naval Biographical Dictionary . John Murray – via Wikisource.

Military offices
Preceded by George Hastings	Commander-in-Chief, Pacific Station; 1869–1872	Succeeded by Sir Charles Hillyar
Preceded by Sir Thomas Symonds	Commander-in-Chief, Plymouth; 1878–1880	Succeeded by Sir Charles Elliot
