= Aldford Street =

Street in London, England

Coordinates: 51.508773°N 0.152683°W

The view down Aldford Street towards the Grosvenor Chapel

Aldford Street is a short street in the Mayfair area of London that runs from the South Audley Street in the east to Park Lane in the west. The western end does not have vehicle access from Park Lane however as it is occupied by the entrance of a pedestrian subway under the road.

== History and description ==
The street was first laid out in the 1730s, developed as part of the Grosvenor Estate. Originally it was named Chapel Street for the Grosvenor Chapel which holds the position of a terminating vista at its eastern end. The 1820s and 1830s saw a wide scale redevelopment of the area under Thomas Cundy II.

In 1886 the street was renamed to Aldford Street after the village of Aldford. It is nearby to the Grosvenor Family's country seat at Eaton Hall, which was a common naming convention for streets and places of the Grosvenor Estate. Shortly after, redevelopment of the street began once again, following on from that of nearby Mount Street. Eustace Balfour, the estate surveyor, designed most of the buildings in the characteristic late Victorian red-brick style of much of the estate, which line the street today. They were originally built as houses but have been subdivided into flats and offices since. Balfour gives his name to the adjacent Balfour Place and Balfour Mews. The street gave its name to Aldford House, a now demolished nearby Park Lane mansion. Notable residents of the street include Beau Brummell, John Gilbert Winant and Harriet Westbrook who eloped from the house at No. 23 with Percy Shelley.
