= Catherine d'Erlanger =

British hostess and patroness of the arts (1874–1959)

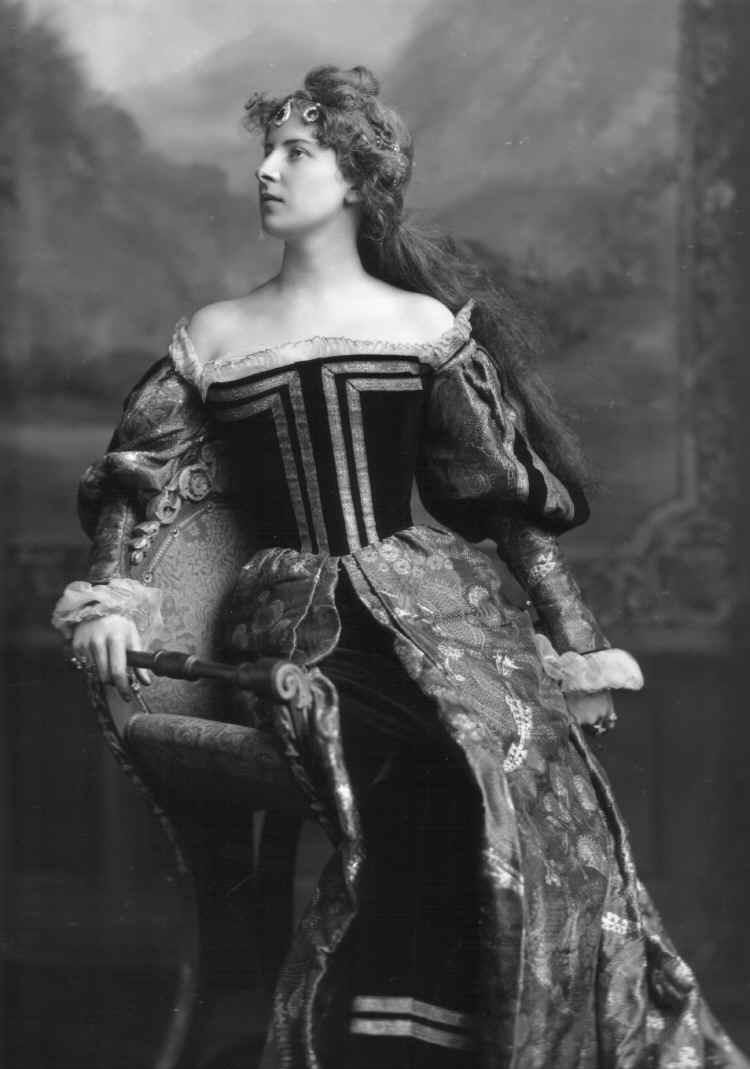
D'Erlanger in 1900

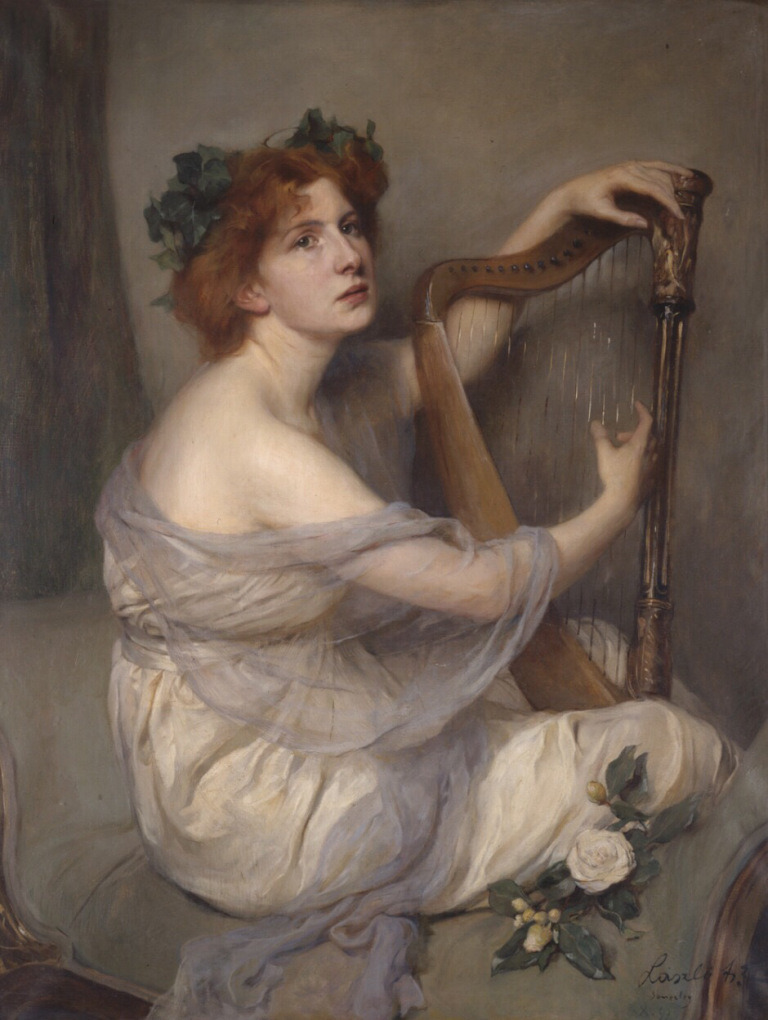
1899 portrait by Philip de László

Marie Rose Antoinette Catherine de Robert d'Aqueria de Rochegude, Baroness d'Erlanger (1874–1959) was a patron of the arts, supporting artists such as the Ballet Russe de Monte Carlo, Cecil Beaton, Romaine Brooks, Philip de László and Sergei Diaghilev. She was known as "The Flame" (La Fiamma) for her hair color. She was widely known as Kate d'Erlanger.

== Biography ==
Marie Rose Antoinette Catherine de Robert d'Aqueria de Rochegude was the daughter of the Marquis d'Aqueria de Rochegude, a landowner and shipowner in Le Havre.

In 1895 she married Baron Emile Beaumont d'Erlanger and they had four children: Robert "Robin" Emile Frédéric Regis d'Erlanger (1896–1934), Mary Liliane Matilda "Baba", Baroness d'Erlanger (1901–1945), Gerard John Regis Leo, Baron d'Erlanger (1905–1962), and Bianca, Baroness d'Erlanger. Her granddaughter, Minnie Caroline d'Erlanger, daughter of Gerard, married Winston Churchill (1940–2010), the grandson of Prime Minister Sir Winston Churchill.

When in London, the d'Erlanger lived at 139 Piccadilly, Lord Byron's former home. D'Erlanger established a famous salon and was one of the most important society hostesses of her time. When in Italy, they stayed at Villa Foscari (or Villa La Malcontenta) which her father-in-law had leased and renovated, and which she purchased in 1926, together with her friends Alberto Clinton Landsberg and Paul Rodocanachi. Bertie Landsberg, issue of an originally Jewish banking family, as the Erlangers, fled the Italian Fascists in 1939 and only returned to the villa in 1947.

Later in life she moved to Hollywood and opened Café Gala, a nightclub popular with Hollywood celebrities and the LGBT crowd due to the fact it was managed by gay singer Johnny Walsh. Cole Porter was a frequent patron, visiting the club several times a week when in California. Judy Garland, Lena Horne, Lennie Hayton were other celebrities attending the club.

She was a patron of the arts, supporting artists such as the Ballet Russe de Monte Carlo, Cecil Beaton, Romaine Brooks, Philip de László and Sergei Diaghilev. She was known as "The Flame" (La Fiamma) for her hair color, and William Bruce Ellis Ranken's portrait bears that name. She was also friends with Enid Bagnold, but the friendship came to an abrupt end when Bagnold satirized the Baroness in the 1924 novel Serena Blandish as Countess Flor di Folio.

== Portraits ==
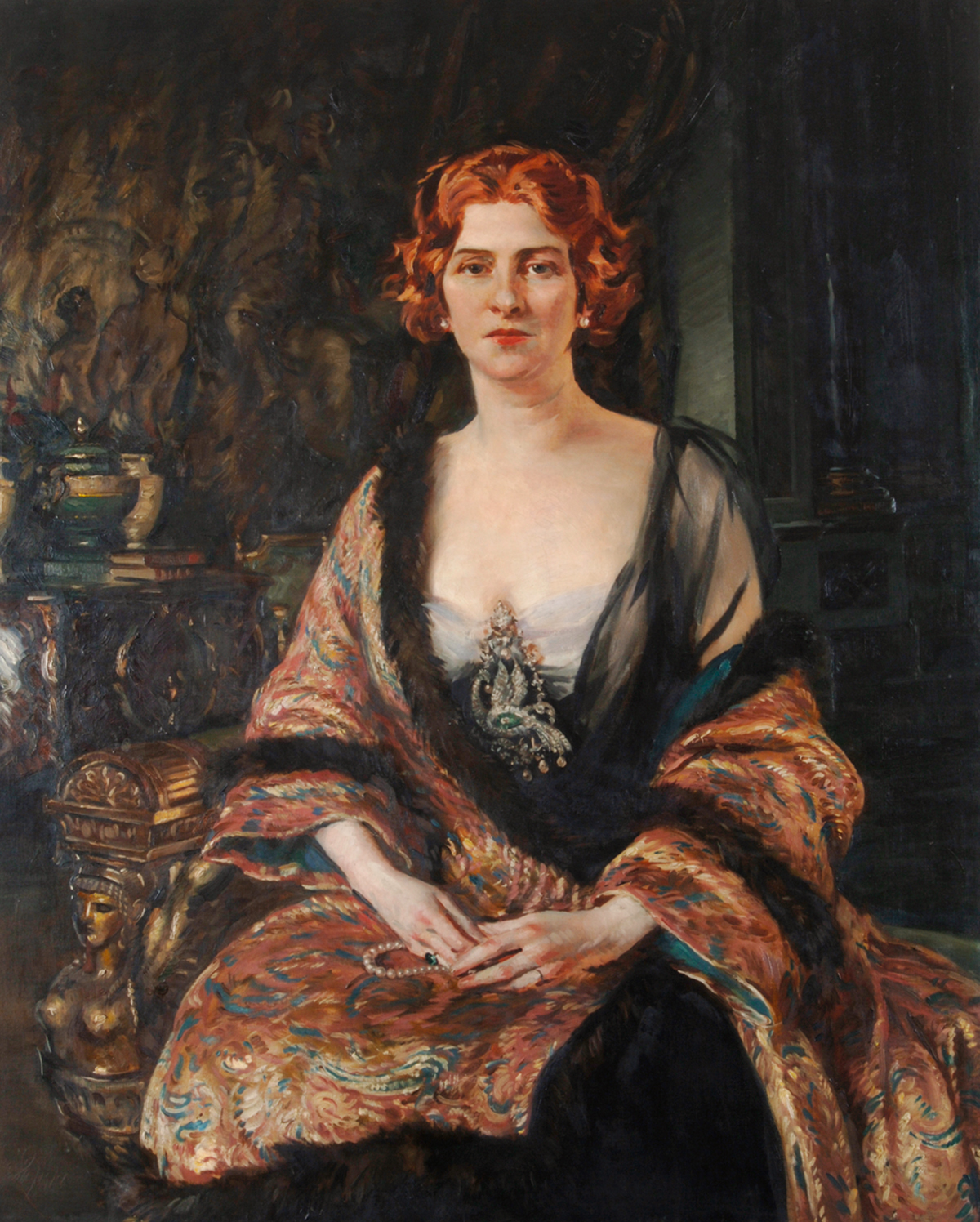
By William Bruce Ellis Ranken, 1918

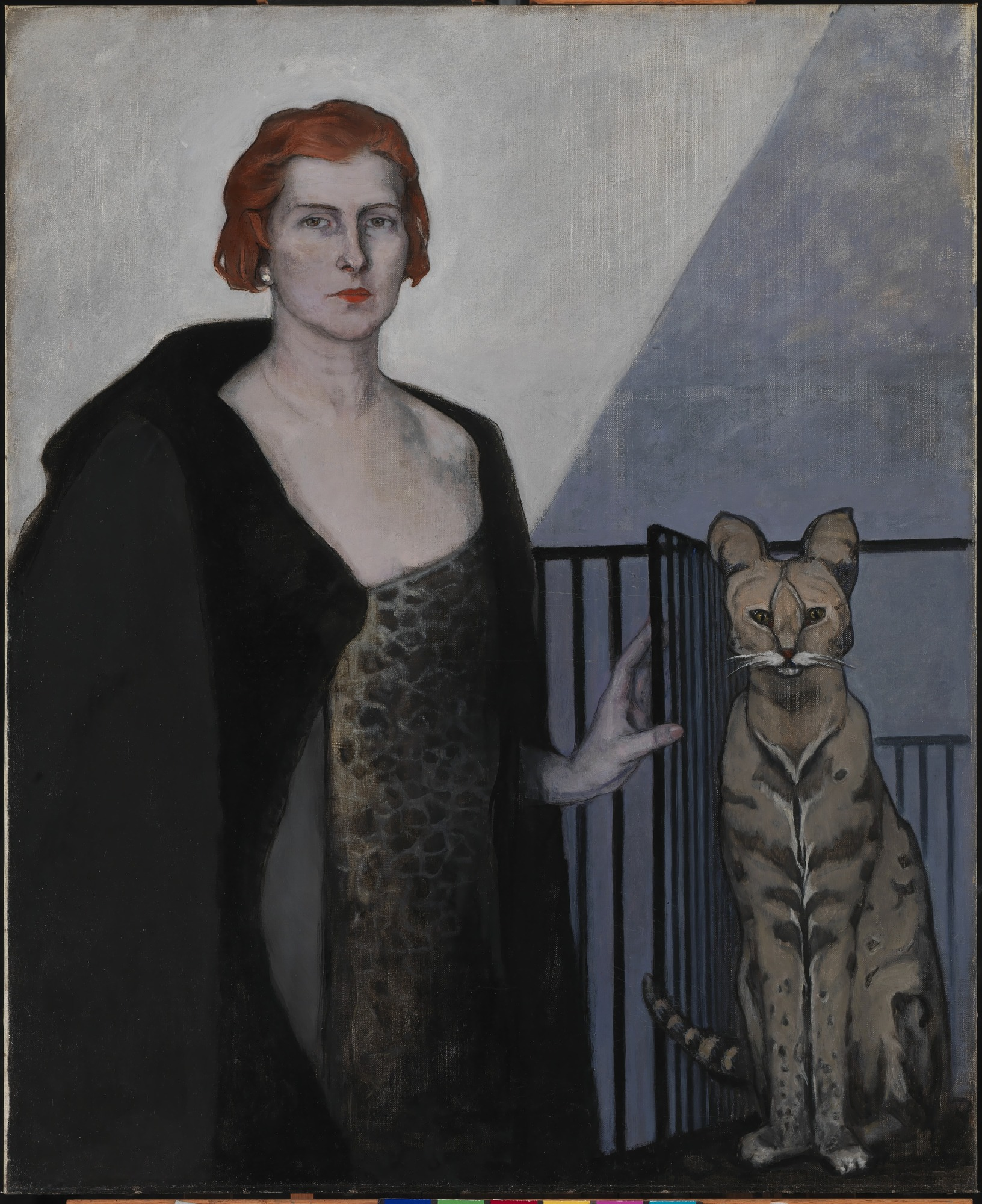
By Romaine Brooks, c. 1924

- 1899, Philip de László, Messum's Fine Art
- 1918, William Bruce Ellis Ranken, Portsmouth Museums
- 1924, Romaine Brooks, Smithsonian American Art Museum
- 1925, Oliver Messel, Private Collection
- 1930, Cecil Beaton, Piccadilly House
