= Bexley Hospital =

- Oxleas NHS Foundation Trust
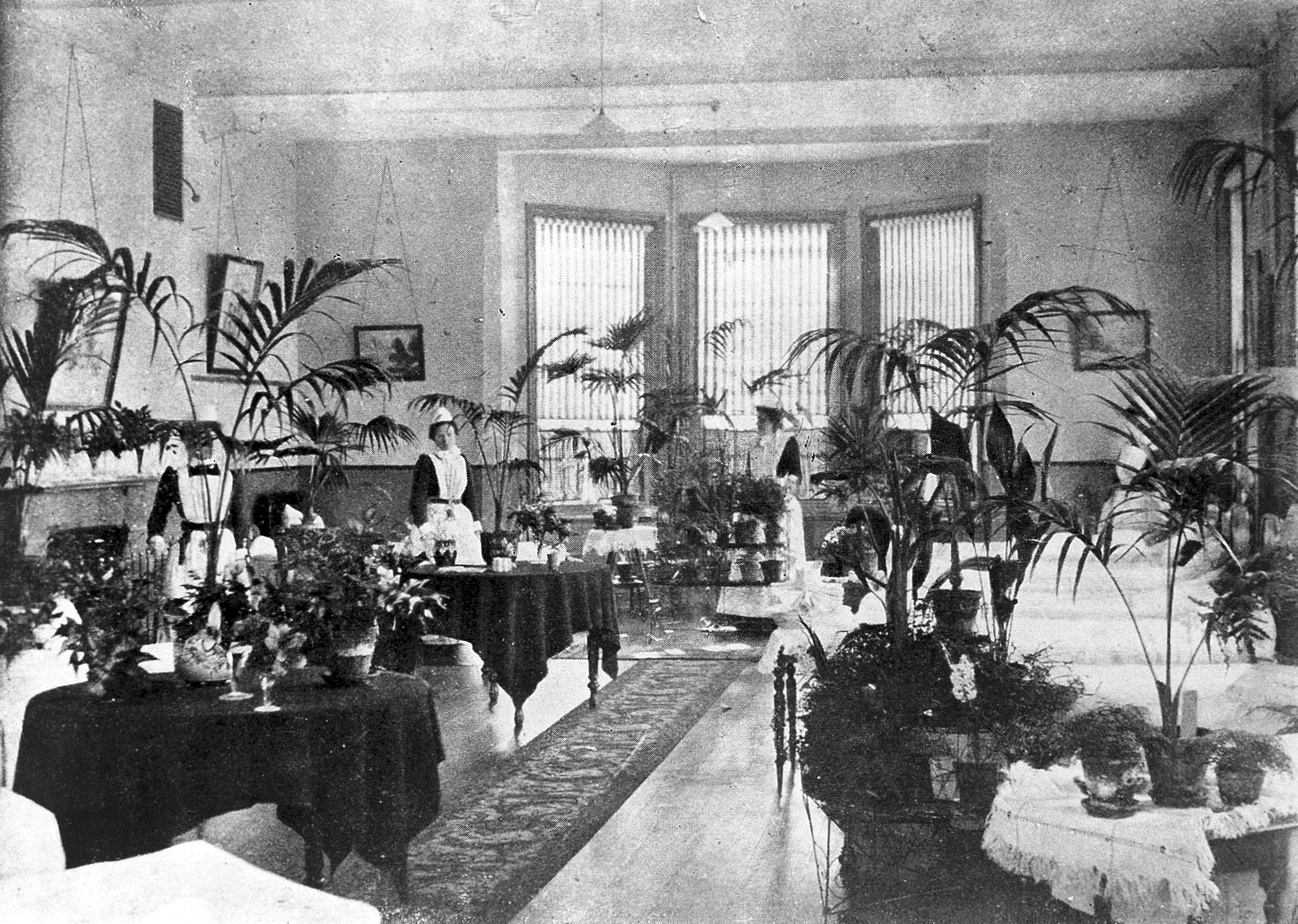
- A ward in the hospital

- Location within Kent

Geography
- Location: Dartford Heath, Bexley, Kent, England, United Kingdom
- Coordinates: 51.4345°N 0.1750°E

Organisation
- Care system: NHS England
- Type: Psychiatric hospital
- Affiliated university: None

History
- Founded: 1898
- Closed: 2001

Links
- Lists: Hospitals in England

Bexley Hospital was a psychiatric hospital at Old Bexley Lane, Dartford Heath, Bexley, in the County of Kent. It operated between 19 September 1898 and 2001.

== History ==
The hospital was designed by George Thomas Hine and opened as the Heath Asylum on 19 September 1898 . Its name was changed to Bexley Mental Hospital in 1918, and it was also known as the Bexley Asylum or informally as the Village on the Heath.

Building the hospital cost £34,000, and it was designed for 2,000 patients. By 1939, the main hospital had expanded to 18 wards (each holding 60 patients), which had become six acute (admission) wards and 32 other wards by the 1970s. A large chapel, seating 850 people, was included within the hospital. Government policy to close Victorian hospitals led inpatient numbers to fall, and by 1977 the number of patients was below 1,000. It was brought into the National Health Service in 1948.

In the 1970s, there were sporting facilities and a weekly film at the cinema, plus a library, and hairdressing for men and women. The Friends of Bexley Hospital provided coach outings and equipment for special projects.

Bexley Hospital was built some distance away from the immediate community as it was designed to be self-sufficient. Until 1961, the hospital had a farm with chickens, ducks, cattle, sheep, and pigs, plus a market garden for vegetables. When the hospital first opened, the patients undertook the maintenance and upkeep of the asylum, along with other duties such as cleaning and making beds; in later years, the farm was maintained by patients, who also looked after the gardens and grounds of the hospital. The hospital closed in 2001.

The site of the hospital was redeveloped in the early 2000s, and is now a housing estate. Some of the original buildings from the earlier hospital site are still in existence, under new uses.
