= Banstead Hospital =

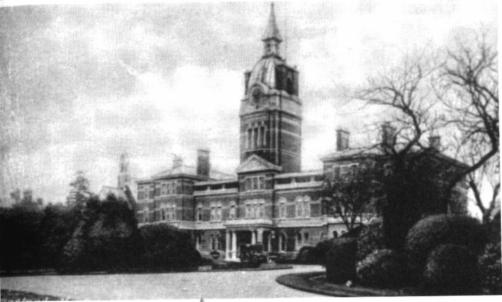
- Banstead Hospital

- Location within Sutton

Geography
- Location: Belmont, Sutton, London, England, United Kingdom
- Coordinates: 51.3355°N 0.1897°W

Organisation
- Care system: NHS England
- Type: Mental health

Services
- Emergency department: No Accident & Emergency

History
- Founded: 1877
- Closed: 1986

Links
- Lists: Hospitals in England

Banstead Hospital, also known as Banstead Asylum, was a psychiatric hospital in the village of Belmont, Sutton, adjacent to Banstead.

== History ==
The hospital was commissioned by the Middlesex Court of Magistrates, as the Third Middlesex County Asylum. The hospital was designed by Frederick Hyde Pownall, and opened with accommodation for 1,700 patients in 1877. Two more blocks were added in 1881, and in 1889 it came under the auspices of London County Council. Spurs to two of the blocks, based on a design by George Thomas Hine, were added in 1893.

The facility became the Banstead Mental Hospital in 1918 and, after a nurses' home was added in 1931, it became Banstead Hospital in 1937. It joined the National Health Service in 1948. In 1967 it split into the Downview Hospital, a facility for adult mental disorders, and the Freedown Hospital, a facility for tuberculosis treatment. It closed in 1986 and was largely demolished in 1989; the site is now occupied by HM Prison High Down.

== Notable patients ==
- Margaret Fairchild (1911-1989), inspiration for The Lady in the Van (2015)
- Vincent Crane (1943–1989), English keyboardist, best known as the organist for The Crazy World of Arthur Brown and Atomic Rooster.
