= Freda Dudley Ward =

English socialite (1894–1983)

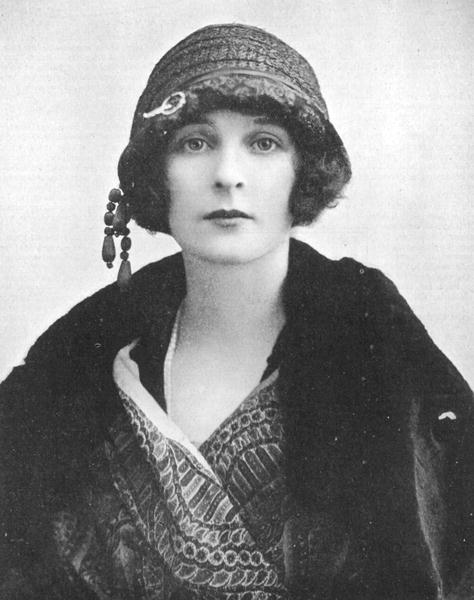
- Freda Dudley Ward in 1919
- Born: Winifred May Birkin; 28 July 1894; Nottingham, Nottinghamshire.
- Died: 16 March 1983 (aged 88)
- Other name: Freda Birkin
- Known for: Mistress of the Prince of Wales (1918–1929)
- Title: Marquesa de Casa Maury
- Spouses: William Dudley Ward (m. 1913; div. 1931) Pedro Monés, Marquess of Casa Maury (m. 1937; div. 1954)
- Children: Penelope, Lady Reed; Claire, Lady Laycock
- Relatives: Sir Thomas Birkin, 1st Baronet (grandfather); Tracy Reed (granddaughter)

Winifred May Mones, Marquesa de Casa Maury (née Birkin, formerly Dudley Ward; 28 July 1894 – 16 March 1983), commonly known by her first married name as Freda Dudley Ward, was an English socialite. She was best known for being a married paramour of Edward, Prince of Wales, who later became Edward VIII.

== Early life ==
Born a member of the wealthy Birkin family, Winifred May was the second child and eldest of three daughters of British Col. Charles Wilfred Birkin (1865-1932), and his American wife, Claire Lloyd Howe (1871-1934), a daughter of Alexander Howe and Ada (née Webb) Howe. They lived at Newcastle Court, Newcastle Circus, The Park, Nottingham. Her father was the fourth son of a lace embroidery and tableware magnate of Nottingham, Sir Thomas Birkin, 1st Baronet, and the former Harriet Tebbutt. Through her brother, Maj. Harry Birkin, she was a great-aunt of the actress and singer Jane Birkin. Another brother, Charles Birkin, was a writer of horror stories.

== Personal life ==
Ward's first husband, William, 1910

She was twice married and divorced. Her first marriage was on 9 July 1913 to William Dudley Ward, the Liberal MP for Southampton. Her first husband's family surname was Ward, but 'Dudley Ward' became their surname through common usage. They divorced on the ground of adultery in 1931 and were the parents of two daughters.

- Penelope "Pempie" Ann Rachel Dudley Ward (1914–1982), an actress; she married Anthony Pelissier in 1939. They divorced in 1944 and she married film director Sir Carol Reed in 1948, becoming Lady Reed.
- Claire Angela "Angie" Louise Dudley Ward (1916–1999), who married the commando leader Maj.-Gen. Sir Robert Laycock in 1935, becoming Lady Laycock.

=== Relationship with the Prince of Wales ===
Although married in 1913 to William Dudley Ward, Freda was also in a relationship with Edward, Prince of Wales from 1918, until she was supplanted by American Thelma Furness (née Morgan) from 1929 to 1934; Thelma introduced Edward to Wallis Simpson. The relationship between the Prince of Wales and the married Ward was common knowledge in aristocratic circles. Winston Churchill observed in 1927, after travelling with them on a train, "It is quite pathetic to see the Prince and Freda. His love is so obvious and undisguisable."

=== Second marriage ===
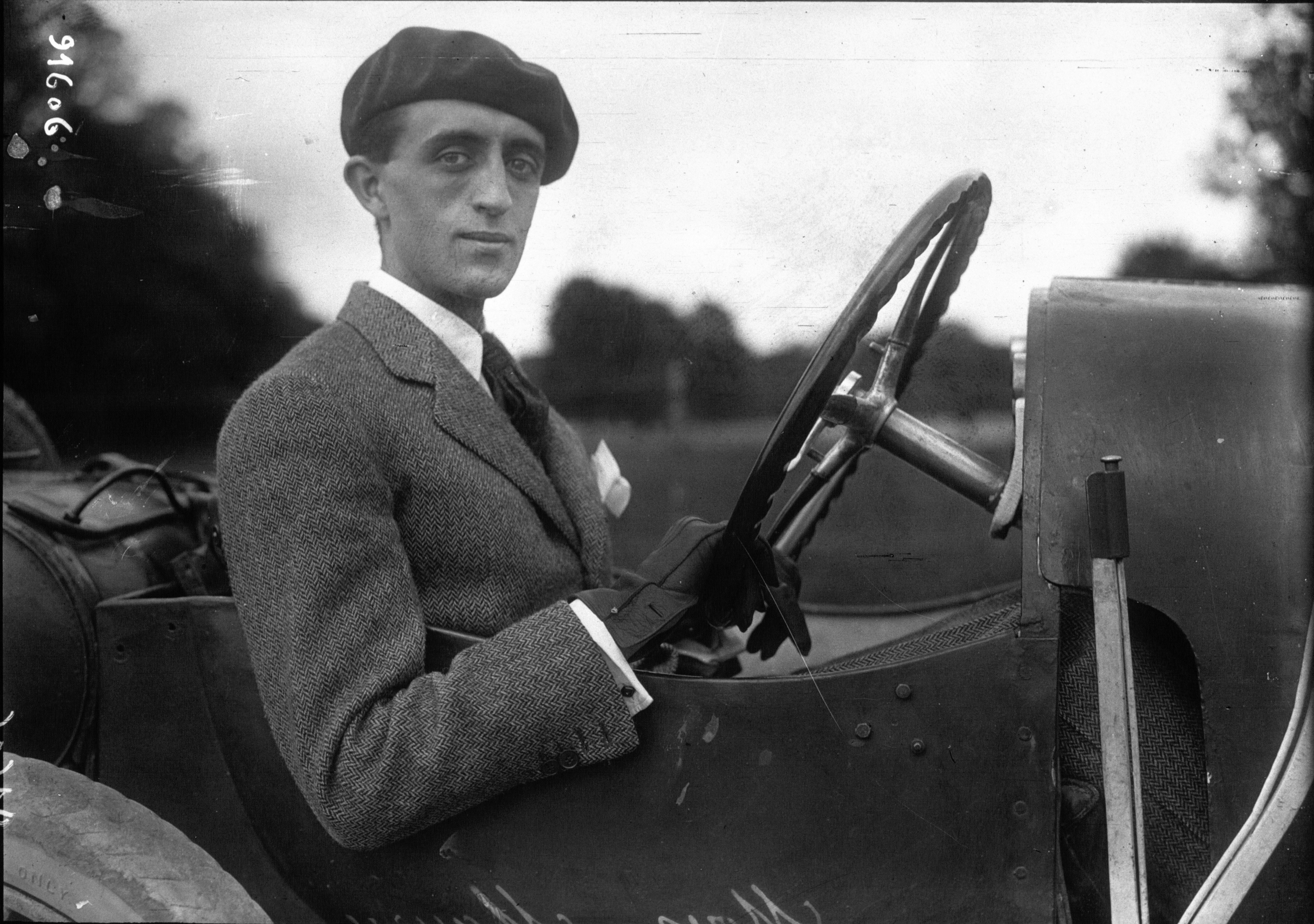
Ward's second husband, Pedro, in his Bugatti, 1921

A few years after her divorce, she married on 20 October 1937 the Cuban-born British Army officer turned theatre impresario Pedro Monés, Marquis de Casa Maury (Note: The title of nobility of Marques de Casa Maury has been conferred to Cuban-British theatrical impresario Pedro José Isidro Manuel Ricardo Monés y Maury by Pope Leo XIII and authorised for use in Spain by King Alfonso XIII shortly thereafter.) (known as Pedro [or Peter] de Casa Maury) (1896-1968), the founder of Curzon Cinemas and former Wing Commander of the Royal Air Force and intelligence officer. From 1938, the couple took up residence in St John's Wood, London, at 58 Hamilton Terrace, which they commissioned from the architects Burnet, Tait, and Lorne. They divorced in 1954.

=== Descendants ===
Through her daughter Penelope, she was a grandmother of Clare Pelissier (1942–2012), an actress who was better known as Tracy Reed (she was the first wife of actor Edward Fox, who later played Edward VIII in Edward & Mrs. Simpson in which their affair is depicted; they had one daughter); and Max Reed (b. 1948).

Through her daughter Claire, she was a grandmother of Joseph William Peter Laycock (1938–1980), who married actress Lucy Fleming (niece of writer Ian Fleming, the creator of James Bond).

== Legacy ==
A portrait of her by the artist John Singer Sargent was discovered on the television series Antiques Roadshow in 2016.

== In popular culture ==
She was portrayed by Kika Markham in the 1978 miniseries Edward & Mrs. Simpson and by Janet Montgomery in the fourth season of Downton Abbey. There she is at the centre of a plot involving an intimate letter written to her by the Prince of Wales being stolen during a debutante ball in Buckingham Palace and its subsequent recovery.

== Sources ==
- Burke's Peerage and Baronetage 107th Edition Volume III at Burke's Peerage – Preview Family Record
- King of Fools by John Parker
