= James Dever =

Irish-born Canadian politician

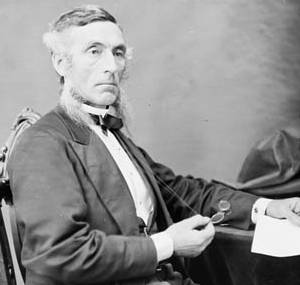
James Dever Source: Library and Archives Canada

James Dever (May 2, 1825 – May 7, 1904) was an Irish-born merchant and political figure in New Brunswick, Canada. He represented Saint John division in the Senate of Canada from 1868 to 1904 as a member of the Liberal party.

He was born in Ballyshannon to James Dever and Catherine Gallagher. He immigrated to New Brunswick with his family at a young age and was educated in Saint John. In 1853, he married Margaret Morris. Dever died in office in Ottawa at the age of 79.
