= William Edward David Allen =

British politician and scholar (1901-1973)

Member of Parliament for Belfast West
- In office 30 May 1929 – 7 October 1931
- Preceded by: Robert Lynn
- Succeeded by: Alexander Browne

Personal details
- Born: 6 January 1901
- Died: 18 September 1973 (aged 72)
- Party: New Party (since 1931)
- Other political affiliations: Unionist (1922–1931)
- Spouse: Paula Gellibrand
- Education: Eton College

William Edward David Allen OBE (6 January 1901 – 18 September 1973) was a British scholar, Foreign Service officer, fascist politician and businessman, best known as a historian of the South Caucasus—notably Georgia.

== Career ==
Born into, on his father's side, an Ulster-Scots family in London and brought up in Hertfordshire, he was educated at Eton College (1914–1918), where he began to learn Russian and Turkish. He published his first book, The Turks in Europe, when he was eighteen. He was a special correspondent for The Morning Post during the Greco-Turkish War (1919–1922) and the Rif War (1925).

In the pre-Second World War years, he travelled a lot and conducted extensive research on the history of the peoples of the Caucasus and Anatolia. In 1930, along with Sir Oliver Wardrop, he founded the Georgian Historical Society; the Society published its own journal, Georgica, dedicated to Kartvelian studies.

His mother financed his personal enterprises until around 1935, and also provided a home at Commonwood House, Chipperfield, Hertfordshire, where he and his brothers could bring their guests at weekends: in Allen's case, he wrote later, these would include "bizarre intellectuals, Caucasian philologists and exiled national leaders from the remoter parts of Central Asia".

In early 1935, he was sent by Oswald Mosley with J. F. C. Fuller to Nazi Germany on a British Union of Fascists mission to study the organisation of the Nazi Party.

In 1940–1, he accompanied Orde Wingate on his mission to Fascist-occupied Ethiopia during the Second Italo-Ethiopian War, and wrote a book of his experiences called Guerrilla War in Abyssinia. On 6 March 1941 the Royal Italian Army division won a victory; what they did know was that a much smaller force opposed them. Wingate set out to fool them in a game of deception: Allen remarked "Perhaps God fights on the side of great hearts and not of the big battalions." The tactic of surprise attacks behind unnerved the garrison at Debra Markos which scarpered in some disorder. He also met and recorded the activities of other Special Operations Executive (SOE) comrades Tony Simonds and Billy Maclean, as remarkable for their informality and eccentricities as their soldierly demeanour.

He wrote with Paul Muratoff (Pavel Muratov) two volumes on the Russian campaign for Penguin Books. John Erickson wrote that they (particularly the second volume) are examples of skilful exploitation of contemporary sources, and even today retain considerable value, including the elucidation of terrain factors.

Allen was an officer with His Majesty's Diplomatic Service from 1943—notably information counsellor at Ankara between 1947 and 1949—until he stepped down and returned to his native Ulster in 1949. There, while living near Killyleagh, County Down, he divided his working time between running the family business (David Allen's, a major bill-posting company) and writing the two major books which he completed during the 1950s: Caucasian Battlefields (1953, with Pavel Muratov), and David Allens (1957, an account of the business and a collective biography of the Allen family). His last book, Russian Embassies to the Georgian Kings (1589-1605), written with the help of the translator Anthony Mango, was published in two volumes by the Hakluyt Society in 1970. He spent his last years living at Whitechurch House, near Cappagh in County Waterford, in the south-east of Ireland.

After his death in Dublin in 1973, his extensive library of books on Georgia and the Caucasus was estimated at £30,000 (worth between £280,000 and £530,000 in 2014). This library is now part of the Indiana University's Lilly Library, which describes it as being 'rich in travel narratives, chronicles and works in linguistics, and [containing] a number of books and some manuscripts in the Georgian language'.

== Political career and fascism ==
Allen stood unsuccessfully in Fermanagh and Tyrone at the 1922 general election, but was elected seven years later on his next attempt, at the 1929 general election as the Unionist Member of Parliament (MP) for Belfast West.

He defected from the Unionists in 1931, to join Sir Oswald Mosley's New Party, but did not contest the 1931 general election. He was Mosley's right-hand man and publicly defended fascist movements, including Mosley's British Union of Fascists, as "the expression of the European will-to-renewal." He was involved as a prospective principal shareholder in Mosley's plan to build a radio broadcasting station with Nazi funding in 1938 following Diana Mosley's successful proposal to Adolf Hitler. In the same year, he negotiated the payment of a large sum to Mosley (£120,000 was demanded and £40,000 offered) via the Belgian Rexist financier Wryns as part of the ransom for the release of Louis Nathaniel de Rothschild by the Nazis.

It was believed that assertions he was an MI5 informant were false; however, documents now available in the National Archive confirm that he was interviewed by MI5 in 1942 and gave over information regarding the BUF's funding from Fascist Italy.

== Personal life ==
He was married: (1) from 1922 to 1932, to Lady Phyllis Edith King (1897–1947), the daughter of Lionel Fortescue King, 3rd Earl of Lovelace (1865–1929); (2) from 1932 to 1939, to Paula Gellibrand (1898–1986), once one of Cecil Beaton's favourite models, formerly the wife of the Marquis de Casa Maury; and (3) from 1943, to Nathalie Maximovna (c. 1900–1966).

== Main works ==
- The Turks in Europe (1919)
- Beled-es-Siba—Sketches and Essays of Travel and History, with a Foreword by Major-General Lord Edward Gleichen (1925)
- "New Political Boundaries in the Caucasus", in The Geographical Journal, Vol. LXIX (1927)
- "The March-Lands of Georgia", in The Geographical Journal, Vol. LXXIV (1929)
- A History of the Georgian People from the Beginning Down to the Russian Conquest in the Nineteenth Century (1932)
- "Note on the Caucasian Snow-Partridge", in Georgica, A Journal of Georgian and Caucasian studies, Nos. 4 & 5
- Strange Coast (1936) (A novel of romance and adventure set in "the Meskhian Republic"—a fictionalised Georgia of the 1920s—which Allen wrote jointly with his second wife, Paula Gellibrand, and which was published under the pseudonym "Liam Pawle")
- The Ukraine: A History (Cambridge University Press, 1940)
- "The Caucasian Borderland", in The Geographical Journal, Vol. IC (1942)
- Guerilla War in Abyssinia (1943)
- The Russian Campaigns of 1941–1943 (Penguin, 1944; with Paul Muratoff)
- The Russian Campaigns 1944–45 (Penguin, 1946; with Paul Muratoff)
- Caucasian Battlefields: A History of the Wars on the Turko-Caucasian Border 1828–1921 (by W. E. D. Allen and Paul Muratoff, 1953)
- "Two Georgian maps of the first half of the eighteenth century", in Imago Mundi—A review of early cartography, Vol. X (1953)
- David Allens: The History of a Family Firm, 1857–1957 (1957) (Attributed to W. E. D. Allen but ghosted in part by his friend Kim Philby, the Communist spy.)
- Problems of Turkish Power in the Sixteenth Century (1963)
- Russian Embassies to the Georgian Kings: 1589–1605 (1970)

== Sources ==
- Macklin, Graham (2020), Failed Führers: A History of Britain's Extreme Right, London: Routledge, ISBN 9780415627290

Parliament of the United Kingdom
| Preceded by Robert Lynn | Member of Parliament for Belfast West; 1929–1931 | Succeeded by Alexander Browne |
