= Arthur Farquhar (Royal Navy officer, born 1855) =

Royal Navy Admiral (1855-1937)

Admiral Sir Arthur Farquhar KCB CVO
- Born: 19 January 1855
- Died: 16 November 1937 (aged 82)
- Spouse: Helen Eva Forbes McNeill (m. 1893)
- Children: John Farquhar
- Parents: Sir Arthur Farquhar (father); Ellen Rickman (mother)
- Relatives: Robert Caldwell (brother-in-law); William Farquhar (great-uncle)
- Military career
- Allegiance: United Kingdom
- Branch: Royal Navy
- Rank: Admiral
- Commands: HMS Wallaroo; HMS Diana; HMS Renown; Coastguard and Reserves
- Awards: KCB, CVO

Admiral Sir Arthur Murray Farquhar, KCB, CVO (19 January 1855 – 16 November 1937) was a British Royal Navy officer in the years before the First World War.

== Naval career ==
Farquhar joined the Royal Navy and was appointed lieutenant in 1876.

He was promoted to captain on 31 December 1896, and commanded the protected cruiser HMS Wallaroo. He was appointed in command of the protected cruiser HMS Diana on 15 January 1901, as she was commissioned at Chatham for service in the Mediterranean Station. Two months later, Diana was one of two cruisers to escort HMS Ophir, commissioned as royal yacht for the World tour of the Duke and Duchess of Cornwall and York (later King George and Queen Mary), from Gibraltar to Malta, and then to Port Said.

He was appointed captain of the second-class pre-dreadnought battleship HMS Renown on 20 May 1902, but did not assume command until mid-June after visiting Palermo with the Diana. He commanded the Renown on the Mediterranean Station throughout the summer for combined manoeuvres with the Mediterranean and Channel Fleets. After the manoeuvres ended, Renown was detached from the Mediterranean Fleet and returned to the United Kingdom to be specially fitted out at Portsmouth to carry the Duke and Duchess of Connaught on a royal tour of India. After the modifications, she was nicknamed the "Battleship Yacht." Farquhar was Captain as Renown carried the Duke and Duchess on their royal tour of India from November 1902 to March 1903. The ship rejoined the Mediterranean Fleet in April.

He was Admiral Commanding Coastguard and Reserves from 1913 to 1915, and retired the following year.

Farquhar was appointed a Knight Commander of the Order of the Bath (KCB) in the 1914 New Year Honours list.

== Family ==
Farquhar married Helen McNeill, daughter of Sir Malcolm McNeill (1839-1919). Their son was Captain John Farquhar, DSO.
