= Kekewich =

Kekewich is a surname. It may refer to:

- George Kekewich (Saltash MP), Member of Parliament (MP) for Saltash in the First Parliament of 1553
- George Kekewich (Liskeard MP), Member of Parliament for Liskeard, 1640 and 1647–1648
- Samuel Kekewich (Sudbury MP), Member of Parliament for Sudbury, 1698–1699
- Samuel Trehawke Kekewich
  - his eldest son by his first wife: Trehawke Kekewich, father of:
    - Sir Trehawke Herbert Kekewich, 1st Baronet
    - Robert Kekewich, British Army officer
  - his second son by his first wife: Sir Arthur Kekewich, judge
  - his son by his second wife: George William Kekewich, MP
