= George Kekewich =

George Kekewich may refer to:

- George Kekewich (Saltash MP) (1530–1582), Member of Parliament (MP) for Saltash in the First Parliament of 1553
- George Kekewich (Roundhead), Member of Parliament for Liskeard, 1640 and 1647–1648
- Sir George William Kekewich (1841–1921), MP for Exeter, 1906–1910

== See also ==
- Kekewich
