= Henry Lopes, 1st Baron Roborough =

British politician (1859–1938)

- Lopes in 1895

High Sheriff of Devon
- In office 1914

Member of Parliament for Grantham
- In office 1892-1900

Personal details
- Born: 24 March 1859
- Died: 14 April 1938 (aged 79)
- Party: Conservative
- Spouse: Louise Edgcumbe (m. 1891)
- Children: Massey Lopes
- Parent: Massey Lopes (father)
- Relatives: John Yarde-Buller (grandfather); Ralph Lopes (grandfather); Henry Lopes (uncle)

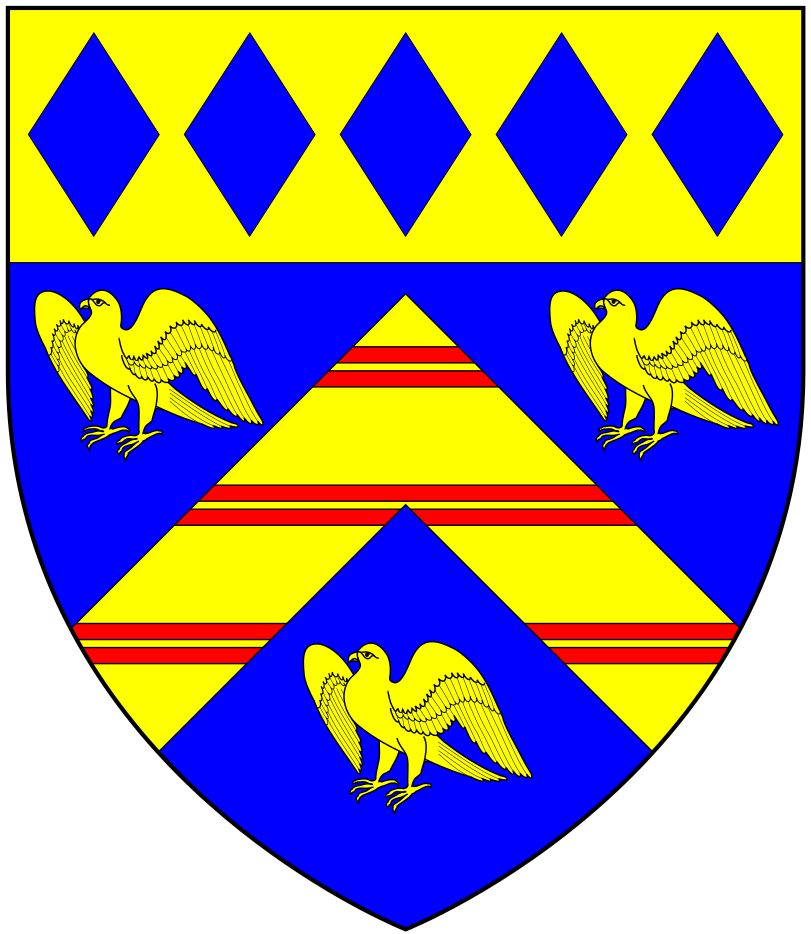
Arms of Lopes: Azure, a chevron or charged with three bars gemelles gules between three eagles rising of the second on a chief of the second five lozenges of the first

Henry Yarde Buller Lopes, 1st Baron Roborough (24 March 1859 – 14 April 1938), known as Sir Henry Lopes, 4th Baronet from 1908 to 1938, of Maristow in the parish of Tamerton Foliot, Devon, was a British Conservative Party politician.

== Life ==
Lopes was the only son of Sir Massey Lopes, 3rd Baronet and Bertha, daughter of John Yarde-Buller, 1st Baron Churston. He was elected to the House of Commons for Grantham in 1892, a seat he held until 1900. He succeeded his father in the baronetcy in 1908 and on 24 January 1938 he was raised to the peerage as Baron Roborough, of Maristow in the County of Devon. He served as High Sheriff of Devon in 1914.

Lord Roborough married Lady Alberta Louise Florence, daughter of William Edgcumbe, 4th Earl of Mount Edgcumbe, in 1891. He died in April 1938, less than three months after his elevation to the peerage, aged 79, and was succeeded in his titles by his son Massey. Lady Roborough died in 1941.

Lopes Hall at the University of Exeter is named in his honour.

== Notes ==
Parliament of the United Kingdom
Preceded by Malcolm Low	Member of Parliament for Grantham; 1892–1900	Succeeded by Sir Arthur Priestley
Peerage of the United Kingdom
New creation	Baron Roborough; 1938	Succeeded by Massey Lopes
Baronetage of the United Kingdom
Preceded by Massey Lopes	Baronet (of Maristow); 1908–1938	Succeeded by Massey Lopes
