= 1873 Devonshire South by-election =

UK Parliamentary by-election

The 1873 Devonshire South by-election was fought on 17 June 1873. The by-election was fought due to the death of the incumbent MP of the Conservative Party, Samuel Trehawke Kekewich. It was won by the Conservative candidate John Carpenter Garnier, who was unopposed.
