= William Courtenay, 11th Earl of Devon =

British politician (1807-1888)

The Right Honourable The Earl of Devon PC
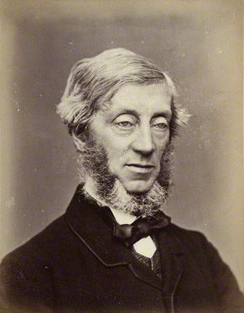
- William Courtenay, 11th Earl of Devon, albumen print, 1870s by John Watkins, National Portrait Gallery, London

Chancellor of the Duchy of Lancaster
- In office 10 July 1866 – 26 June 1867
- Monarch: Victoria
- Prime Minister: The Earl of Derby
- Preceded by: George Goschen
- Succeeded by: John Wilson-Patten

President of the Poor Law Board
- In office 21 May 1867 – 1 December 1868
- Monarch: Victoria
- Prime Minister: The Earl of Derby; Benjamin Disraeli
- Preceded by: Gathorne Hardy
- Succeeded by: George Goschen

Personal details
- Born: 14 April 1807 London, England
- Died: 18 November 1888 (aged 81) Powderham Castle, Devon, England
- Party: Conservative
- Spouse: Lady Elizabeth Fortescue
- Children: 4, including Edward Courtenay, 12th Earl of Devon
- Parent(s): William Courtenay, 10th Earl of Devon; Harriet Leslie Pepys
- Education: Christ Church, Oxford
- Occupation: Politician

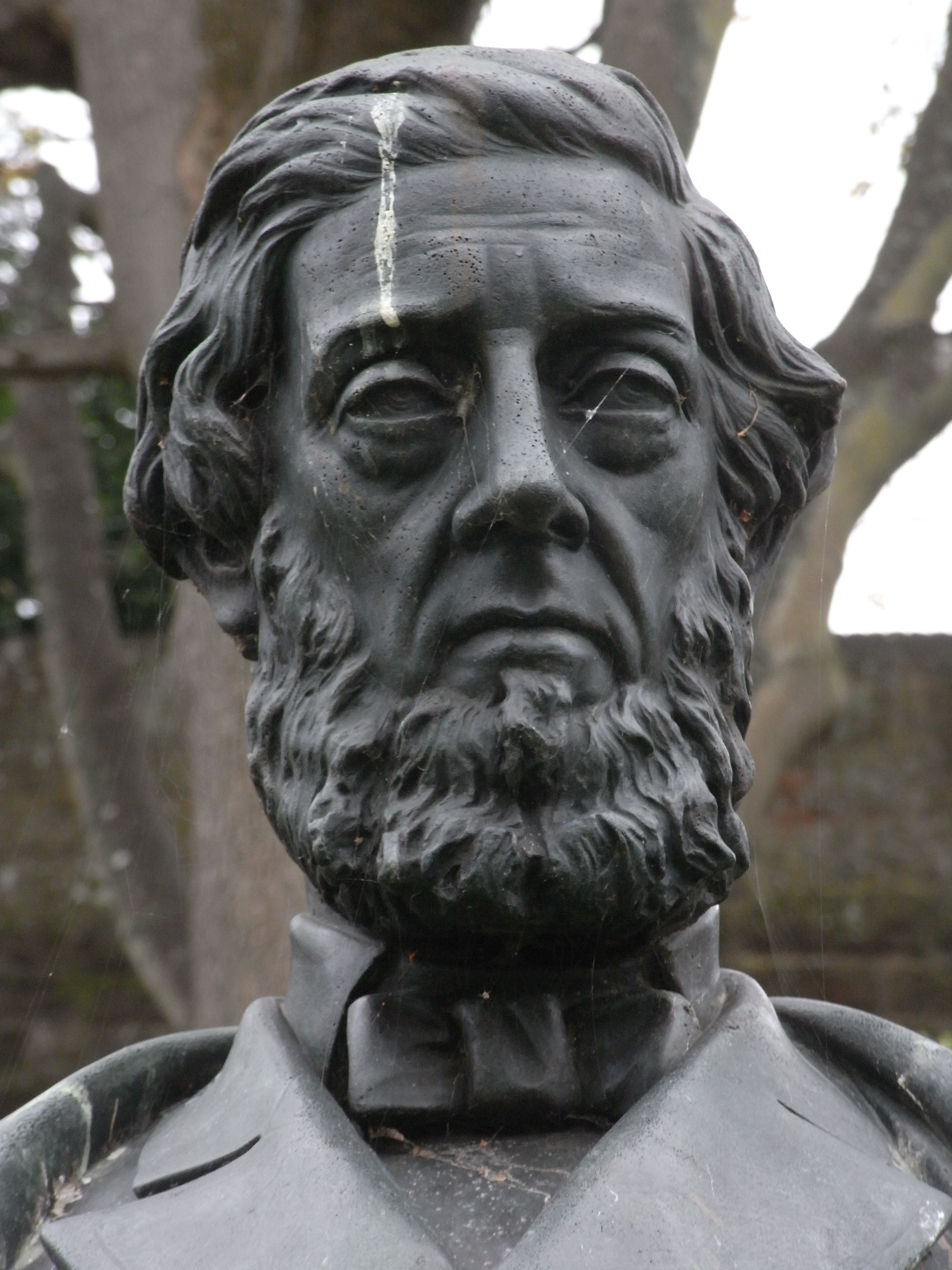
William Reginald Courtenay, 11th Earl of Devon, sculpted by Edward Bowring Stephens (1815–1882), Northernhay Gardens, Exeter

William Reginald Courtenay, 11th Earl of Devon PC (14 April 1807 – 18 November 1888), styled Lord Courtenay between 1835 and 1859, was a British politician who served as Chancellor of the Duchy of Lancaster from 1866 to 1867 and as President of the Poor Law Board from 1867 to 1868.

== Background and education ==
Devon was the eldest son of William Courtenay, 10th Earl of Devon and his first wife Harriet Leslie Pepys, daughter of Sir Lucas Pepys, 1st Baronet. He was educated at Westminster School and at Christ Church, Oxford, and was called to the Bar, Lincoln's Inn, in 1832.

== Political career ==
In 1841 Devon was elected to Parliament for South Devon as a Tory. However, when the Tories split over the Corn Laws in 1846, he joined the Peelites. In 1849 Devon was appointed poor-law inspector and retired from the House of Commons. He then served as secretary to the Poor Law Board from 1850 to 1859. The latter year he succeeded his father and took his seat in the House of Lords.

He had returned to the Conservative Party (the official name of the Tory Party since the 1850s) before his succession, and when the party came to power in 1866 under the Earl of Derby, Devon was appointed Chancellor of the Duchy of Lancaster (although without a seat in the cabinet) and admitted to the Privy Council. He remained in this post until May the following year, when he became President of the Poor Law Board. However, in contrast to his predecessor in the post, Gathorne Hardy, he was not included in the cabinet this time either. Devon continued as President of the Poor Law Board until the Conservatives lost power in December 1868. After this he stopped taking an active part in politics.

Apart from his participation in national politics, Devon was heavily involved in local affairs and charitable causes in his home county of Devon. Regarded as the most influential man in the county, he notably served as a director and later as chairman of the Bristol and Exeter Railway. Known as "the good earl", a statue of him was erected in Exeter, paid for by public subscription. Lord Courtenay was a member of the Canterbury Association from 27 March 1848 until 21 April 1852, when he resigned. He was appointed Honorary Colonel of the 1st (Exeter and South Devon) Devonshire Rifle Volunteer Corps on 2 June 1877.

== Marriage and progeny ==
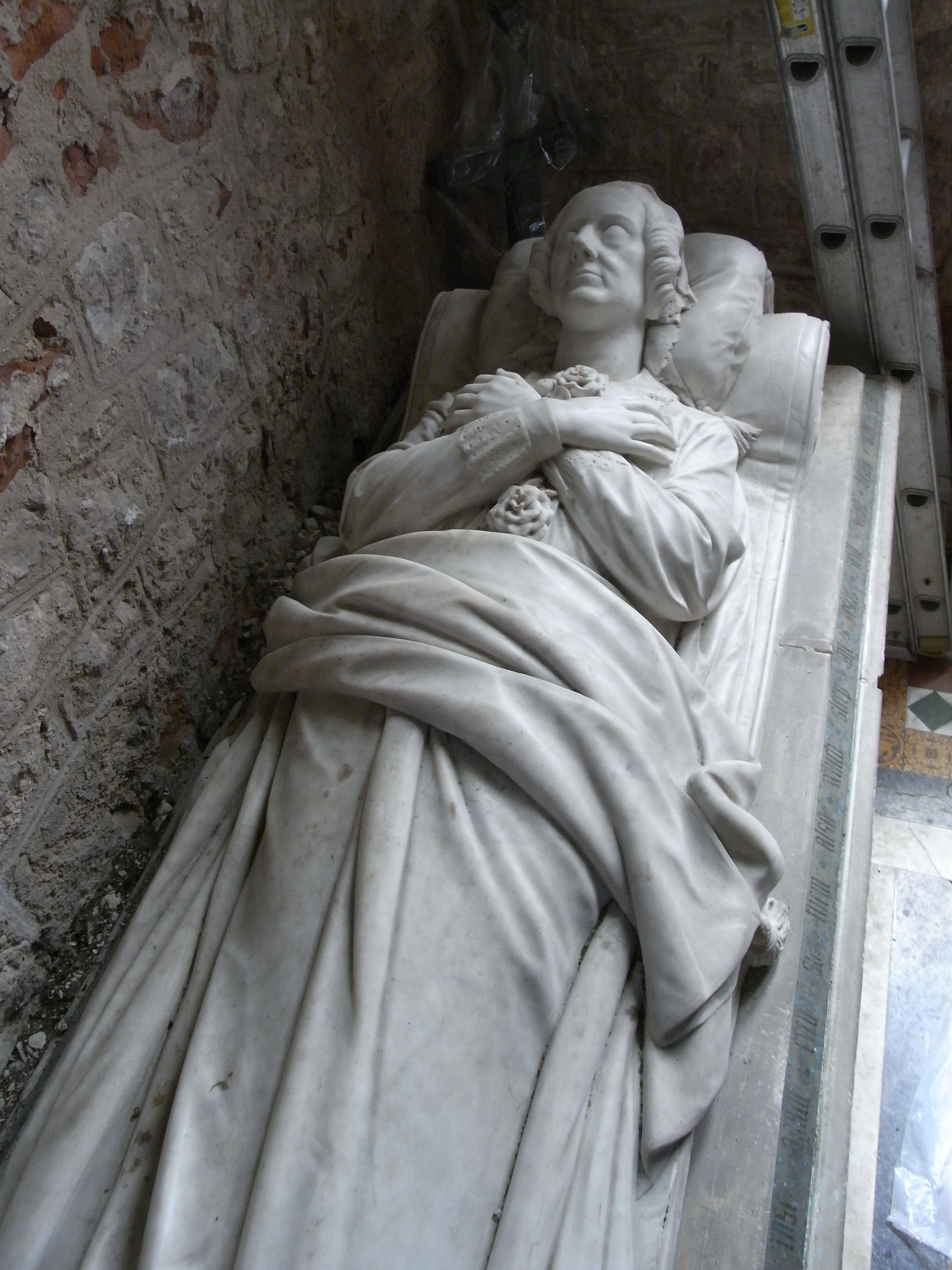
Effigy of Elizabeth, Countess of Devon (d. 27 Jan 1867), on chest tomb, by Edward Bowring Stephens (1815–1882) in St Clement's Church, Powderham, against the east wall of the south transept. A plaster cast exists in the chapel attached to Powderham Castle

In 1830 Lord Devon married Lady Elizabeth Fortescue (d. 27 January 1867), daughter of Hugh Fortescue, 1st Earl Fortescue. Her tomb chest with a full-length recumbent alabaster effigy by Edward Bowring Stephens is situated in St Clement's Church, Powderham, against the east wall of the south transept, with a plaster cast in the chapel attached to Powderham Castle, in an ogee arched alcove in the north wall of the chancel. They had three sons and one daughter. He was succeeded in the earldom by his youngest but only surviving son Edward:

- William Reginald Courtenay (28 Oct 1832 – 21 Nov 1853), died aged 21. A large granite memorial cross exists in the north churchyard of St Clement's Church, Powderham, inscribed on the west side of the base: "William Reginald Courtenay eldest son of Lord & Lady Courtenay, born Oct 28 1832 died Nov.r 21 1853. In memory of their first born and much beloved child this cross is erected by his sorrowing parents". Underneath was added later in metal lettering: "Edward Baldwin 12th Earl of Devon Born 7 May 1836 Died 15 Jan.r 1891". On the north side is inscribed: "William Reginald XI Earl of Devon. Born April 14, 1807 Died Novr. 18 1888". On the east side is inscribed: "Sorrow not even as others which have no hope for if we believe that Jesus died and rose again even so them also which sleep in Jesus will God bring with him. I Thess. IV 13.14". On the south side is inscribed: "Elizabeth Countess of Devon Died Janr. 27th 1887", and underneath in metal lettering: "Agnes Elizabeth Viscountess Halifax Born 1 May 1838 Died 4 July 1919".
- Hugh Courtenay (10 Nov 1833 – 13 Mar 1835), died young.
- Edward Baldwin Courtenay, 12th Earl of Devon (7 May 1836 – 15 Jan 1891)
- Lady Agnes Elizabeth Courtenay (1 May 1838 – 4 July 1919). She married on 22 April 1869 Charles Lindley Wood, 2nd Viscount Halifax (1839–1934) of Monk Bretton, son of Charles Wood, 1st Viscount Halifax of Monk Bretton by Lady Mary Grey.

He owned 53,000 acres including 33,000 in County Limerick.

== Death ==
He died at his seat of Powderham Castle in November 1888, at 81.

== Portraits ==
=== Painting ===
An oil painting of the 11th Earl hangs at Powderham Castle, high on the south wall of the Dining Hall.

=== Statue ===
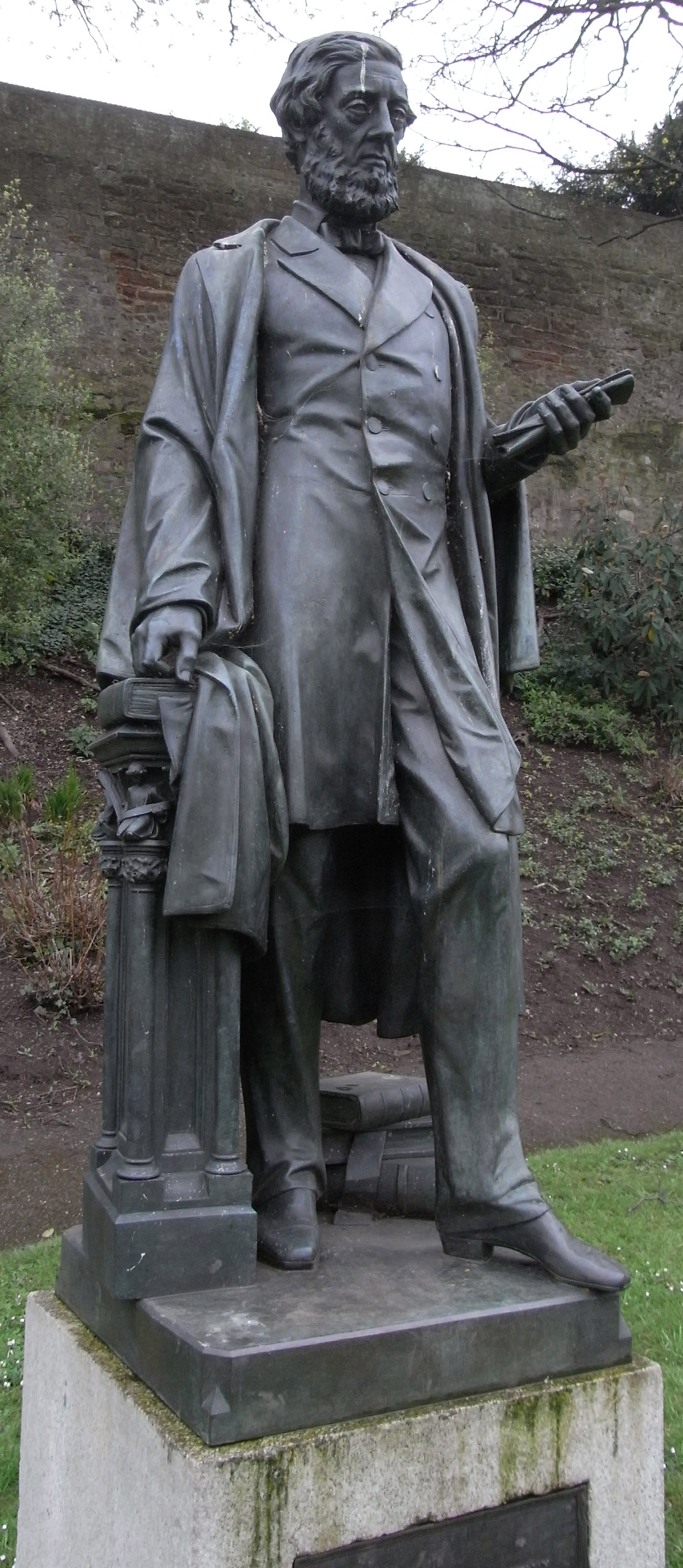
Bronze statue of 11th Earl of Devon by Edward Bowring Stephens, Northernhay Gardens, Exeter

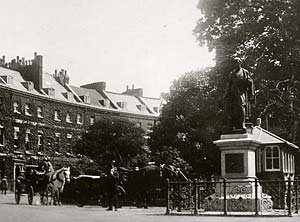
Statue of William Courtenay, 11th Earl of Devon, by Edward Bowring Stephens (1815–1882), in Bedford Circus, Exeter, where it stood from its unveiling in 1880 (having replaced Stephens' The Deerstalker) to after 1942 when it escaped WW II bombing and was placed in storage. It stands in 2013 in Northernhay Gardens, Exeter

A bronze statue was made of the Earl by the Exeter sculptor Edward Bowring Stephens and in October 1880 was erected at the front of the central garden in Bedford Circus, Exeter, on the spot where Stephens' "The Deer Stalker" had formerly stood. (The latter statue now stands near the Earl's statue, both having been re-located in Northernhay Gardens). The unveiling ceremony was attended by Sir Stafford Northcote (1818–1887), later Lord Lieutenant of Devon 1886–7, (whose own statue in Northernhay Gardens now stands nearby) with the Mayor and Corporation, other dignitaries and the Earl himself. The statue was paid for by public subscription to the Devon Statue Fund, which had attracted 1,300 signatories for this work. A banquet was held following the unveiling ceremony. The plinth is of Cornish granite from the Cheesewring Quarries, on the rear of which a bronze plaque is affixed inscribed with verse from Wordsworth's Happy Warrior:

"Who not content that former worth stand fast,
Looks forward persevering to the last,
From well to better daily self-surpast."

Although the Circus was destroyed by German bombing in May 1942, the statue survived intact. It was thereafter hidden from view in storage at Tan Lane until the 1950s, when it was re-erected in Bedford Street. A bronze plaque on the front of the plinth is inscribed:

"This statue stood in Bedford Circus prior to World War II. The statue was erected on this site (i.e. Bedford Street) by Exeter City Council and Devon County Council as part of a joint landscaping scheme".

Following the re-development of Princesshay in 2005 which involved the partial demolition of Bedford Street, the statue was again removed to storage in the Belle Isles council yard. It underwent restoration by Ian Clarke Restoration, including cleansing of graffiti, and was re-erected in Northernhay Gardens. The unveiling ceremony occurred on 9 February 2010, attended this time by only a small handful of interested parties, including the then Earl of Devon and the Lord Mayor, John Winterbottom. Its last move is recorded by an inscription on a granite slab on the ground at the front of the plinth: "Lord Devon was moved in 2010 to Northernhay Gardens from Bedford St".

== Memorial chimneypiece at Powderham ==
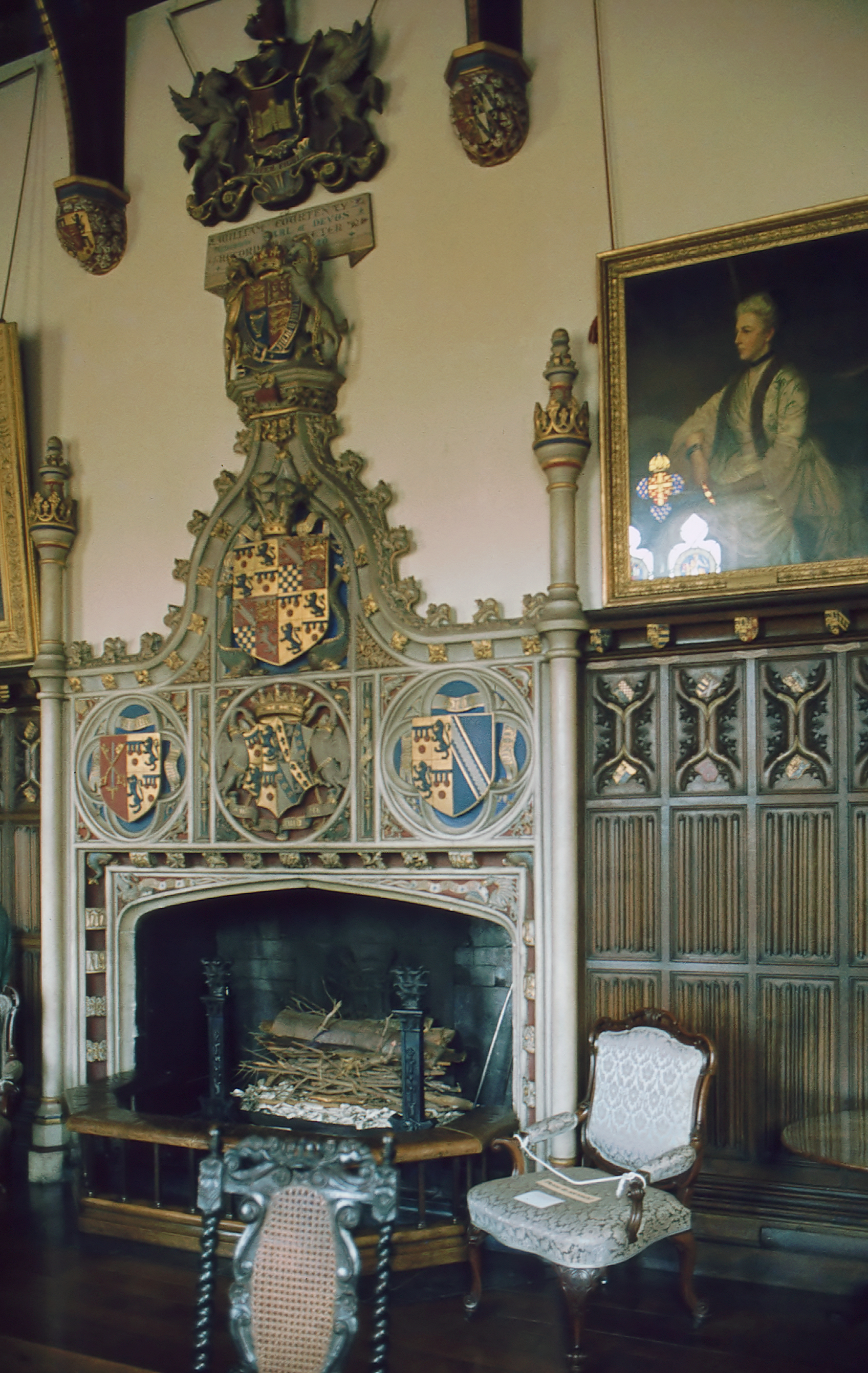
The heraldic chimneypiece at Powderham Castle

The 11th Earl installed a heraldic chimneypiece in the Dining Hall at Powderham Castle in memory of his grandfather Reginald Courtenay (1741–1803), Bishop of Exeter from 1797 to 1803, and of his parents. The Dining Hall was built by his father the 10th Earl between 1847 and his death in 1859 and the 11th Earl completed the internal decorations in 1860 including the linen-fold panelling containing several dozen ancestral heraldic shields. It is copied from the mediaeval chimneypiece in the Bishop's Palace, Exeter, installed c. 1485 by Peter Courtenay (d.1492) Bishop of Exeter, a younger son of Sir Philip Courtenay (1404–1463) of Powderham. The armorials on the lowest row are from left to right:

- Arms of Bishop Reginald Courtenay: See of Exeter impaling Courtenay (Grandfather of 11th Earl of Devon)
- Arms of William Courtenay, 10th Earl of Devon (d.1859), impaling the arms of his wife Hariet Leslie: Quarterly 1st & 4th: Pepys, Baronets of Juniper Hill; 2nd & 3rd: Leslie, Earls of Rothes. (Parents of 11th Earl of Devon). The supporters are two of the Bohun swans, which bird was used by that family, from which came the wife of Hugh Courtenay, 2nd Earl of Devon (d.1377), heiress of Powderham, as a heraldic badge. In the spandrels are two dolphins, a badge of the Courtenays. These arms can be seen on a brass plate on their monument in Powderham Church, itself a copy of the 15th-century Courtenay monument in Colyton Church.
- Arms of 11th Earl of Devon impaling arms of his wife Elizabeth Fortescue

Parliament of the United Kingdom
Preceded by Sir John Yarde-Buller, Bt; Montague Parker	Member of Parliament for South Devon; 1841–1847; With: Sir John Yarde-Buller, Bt	Succeeded by Sir John Yarde-Buller, Bt; Sir Ralph Lopes, Bt
Political offices
Preceded by George Goschen	Chancellor of the Duchy of Lancaster; 1866–1867	Succeeded by John Wilson-Patten
Preceded by Gathorne Hardy	President of the Poor Law Board; 1867–1868	Succeeded by George Goschen
Peerage of England
Preceded by William Courtenay	Earl of Devon; Fifth creation 1859–1888	Succeeded by Edward Baldwin Courtenay
