= Baron Roborough =

Barony in the Peerage of the United Kingdom

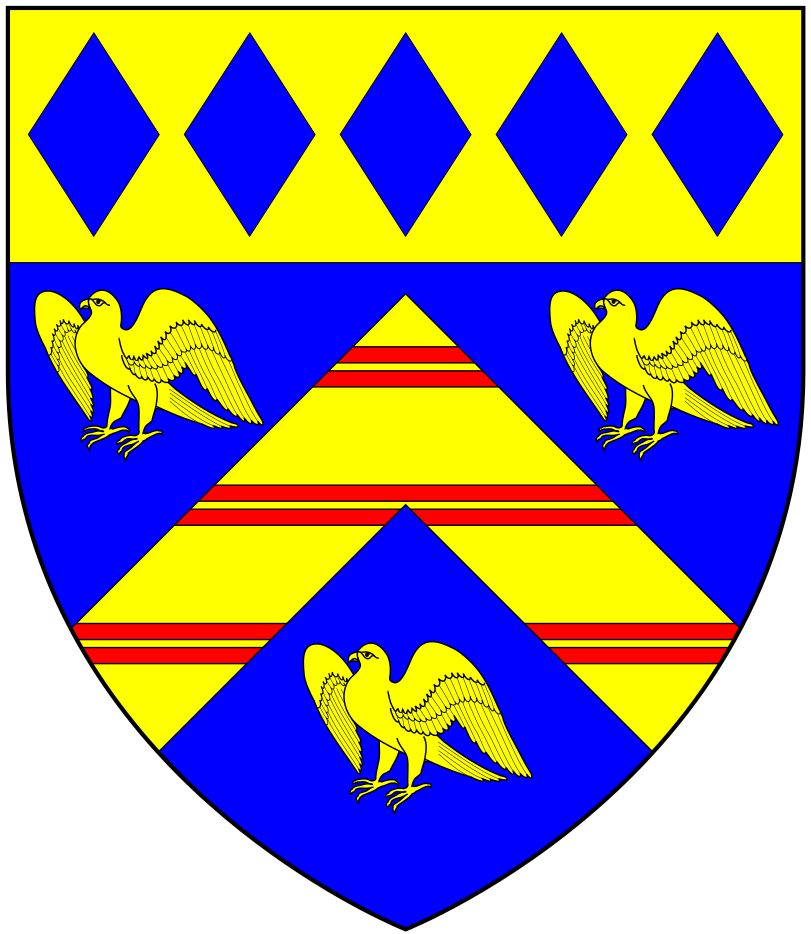
Arms of Lopes: Azure, a chevron or charged with three bars gemelles gules between three eagles rising of the second on a chief of the second five lozenges of the first

Baron Roborough, of Maristow in the County of Devon, is a title in the Peerage of the United Kingdom. It was created on 24 January 1938 for Sir Henry Lopes, 4th Baronet. He had earlier represented Grantham, Lincolnshire, in Parliament as a Conservative. The Baronetcy, of Maristow House in the County of Devon, had been created in the Baronetage of the United Kingdom on 1 November 1805 for Manasseh Masseh Lopes, a member of a wealthy family of Portuguese Jewish origin, with special remainder to his nephew Ralph Franco, son of his sister Maria. Manasseh Masseh Lopes converted to Christianity in 1802, and later represented Evesham, in Worcestershire, Barnstaple in Devon, and Westbury in Wiltshire, in Parliament. However, in 1819 he was twice convicted of bribing the voters in both Barnstaple and Grampound in order to be elected to Parliament, and was sentenced to imprisonment and heavy fines. He was also unseated by the House of Commons, but after his release from prison he nonetheless got elected for Westbury, a pocket borough which he controlled to a great extent.

Lopes was succeeded according to the special remainder by his nephew Ralph Franco, the second Baronet, who assumed the surname of Lopes in lieu of Franco. He was Conservative Member of Parliament for Westbury and later for South Devonshire. His son, the third Baronet, also sat as Conservative Member of Parliament for Westbury and South Devonshire and served under Benjamin Disraeli as a Civil Lord of the Admiralty from 1874 to 1880. In 1885 he was admitted to the Privy Council. He was the father of the fourth Baronet, who was raised to the peerage in 1938. The first Baron's son, the second Baron, was Lord Lieutenant of Devon from 1958 to 1978. As of 2015 the titles are held by the latter's grandson, the fourth Baron, who succeeded in 2015.

Henry Lopes, 1st Baron Ludlow, was a younger son of the second Baronet.

The family seat was Maristow House, in the parish of Tamerton Foliot, near Plymouth, Devon, (which they occupied 1798–1938) with the dower house being at nearby Roborough House, in Roborough, near Plymouth, Devon. Their seat today is Bickham House, adjoining the Maristow House estate to the north-east.

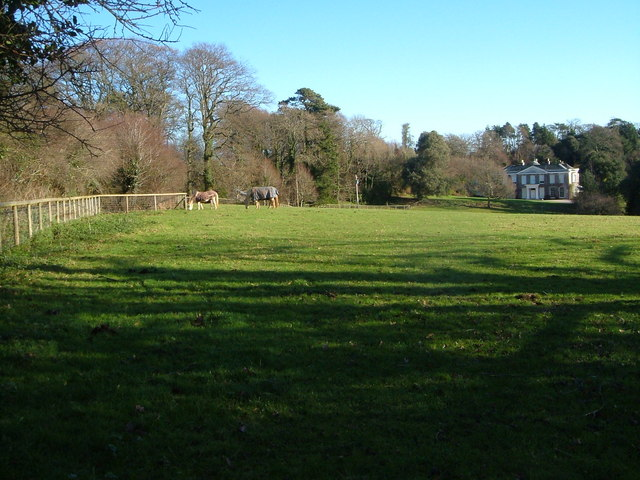
Gnaton Hall

The Lopes family, descendants of Sir Manasseh Masseh Lopes, 1st Baronet, lived in Roborough in the twentieth century, after moving from nearby Maristow House and before relocating to Gnaton, a smaller mansion on the coast near Noss Mayo. The very old village pub, which stands on the main street of Roborough is called the Lopes Arms.

== Lopes Baronets, of Maristow (1805) ==
- Sir Manasseh Masseh Lopes, 1st Baronet (1755–1831)
- Sir Ralph Lopes, 2nd Baronet (1788–1854)
- Sir Massey Lopes, 3rd Baronet (1818–1908)
- Sir Henry Yarde Buller Lopes, 4th Baronet (1859–1938) (created Baron Roborough in 1938)

== Barons Roborough (1938) ==
- Henry Yarde Buller Lopes, 1st Baron Roborough (1859–1938)
- Massey Henry Edgcumbe Lopes, 2nd Baron Roborough (1903–1992)
- Henry Massey Lopes, 3rd Baron Roborough (1940–2015)
- Massey John Henry Lopes, 4th Baron Roborough (b. 1969)

The heir apparent is the present holder's son Hon. Henry Massey Peter Lopes (born 1997).

Line of succession
- Henry Lopes, 1st Baron Roborough (1859–1938)
  - Massey Lopes, 2nd Baron Roborough (1903–1992)
    - Henry Lopes, 3rd Baron Roborough (1940–2015)
      - Massey Lopes, 4th Baron Roborough (born 1969)
        - (1) Henry Lopes (b. 1997)
        - (2) Ralph Lopes (b. 1999)
      - (3) Andrew Lopes (b. 1971)
        - (4) Sascha Lopes (b. 1995)
    - (5) George Lopes (b. 1945)
      - (6) Henry Lopes (b. 1977)
        - (7) Gus Lopes (b. 2009)
        - (8) Louis Lopes (b. 2009)

== Coat of arms ==
Coat of arms of Baron Roborough
Coronet A coronet of a Baron Crest 1st: a Lion sejant Erminois, gorged with a Collar Gemelle Gules, the dexter forepaw resting on a Lozenge Azure (Lopes). 2nd: a Dexter Arm couped and embowed habited Purpure, purfled and diapered Or, cuffed Argent, holding in the Hand proper a Palm-branch Vert (Franco). Escutcheon Quarterly: 1st and 4th, Azure, a Chevron Or, charged with three Bars Gemelle Gules, between three Eagles rising Or, on a Chief Or, five Lozenges Azure (Lopes); 2nd and 3rd, in a landscape field a Fountain, issuing thereout a Palm-tree, all proper (Franco). Supporters Dexter: a Lion proper, gorged with a Collar Gemelle and charged on the shoulder with a Lozenge Azure. Sinister: a Bull proper, charged on the shoulder with a Lozenge Azure. Motto QUOD TIBI ID ALII (Do to another as you would be done by)

== See also ==
- Baron Ludlow

== Notes ==
Baronetage of the United Kingdom
Preceded by Champion de Crespigny baronets	Lopes baronets of Maristow; 1 November 1805	Succeeded by Cotterell baronets
