= Massey Lopes =

British Conservative politician and agriculturalist

The Right Honourable Sir Massey Lopes Bt
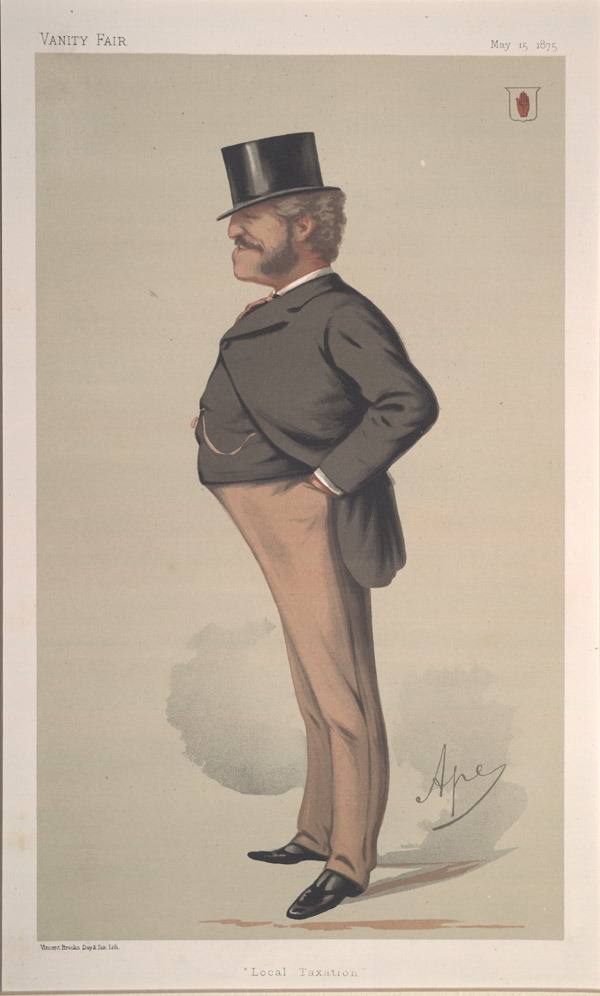
- "Local Taxation". Caricature by Ape published in Vanity Fair in 1875

Member of Parliament for Devonshire South
- In office 1868–1885

Civil Lord of the Admiralty
- In office 1874–1880

Member of Parliament for Westbury
- In office 1857–1868

High Sheriff of Devon
- In office 1857

Personal details
- Born: 14 June 1818
- Died: 20 January 1908 (aged 89)
- Party: Conservative
- Spouse(s): Bertha Yarde-Buller (d. 1872); Louisa Newman (d. 1903)
- Children: 3, including Henry
- Parent: Ralph Lopes (father)
- Relatives: Henry Lopes (brother); Manasseh Lopes (great-uncle)
- Education: Oriel College, Oxford

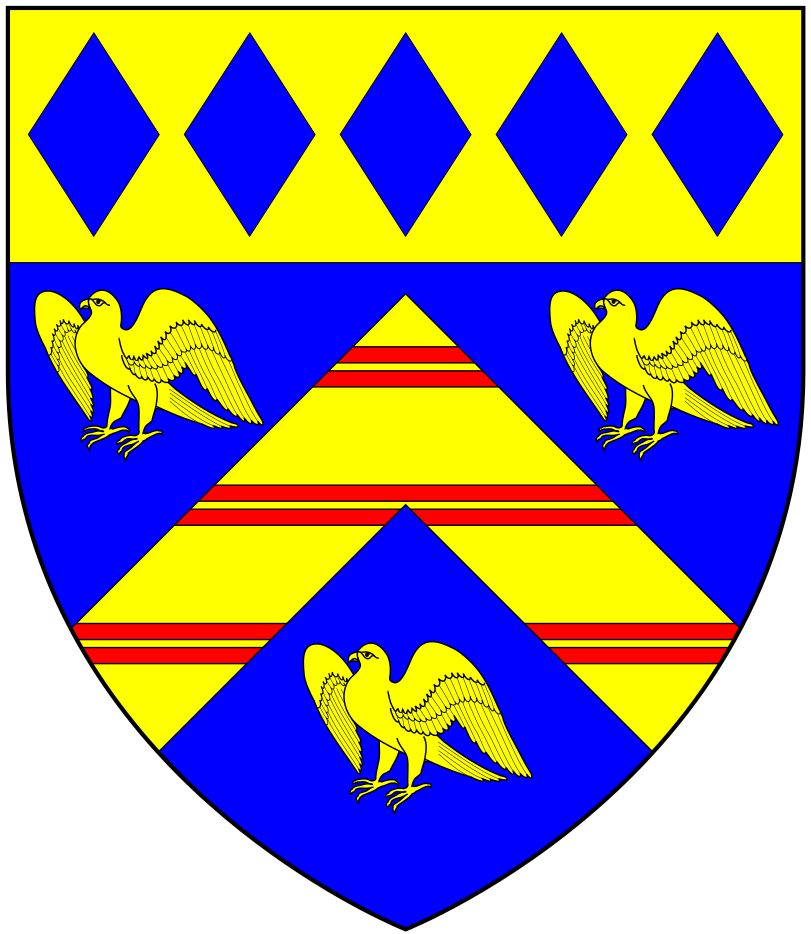
Arms of Lopes: Azure, a chevron or charged with three bars gemelles gules between three eagles rising of the second on a chief of the second five lozenges of the first

Sir Lopes Massey Lopes, 3rd Baronet, PC (14 June 1818 – 20 January 1908), known as Massey Franco until 1831, of Maristow in the parish of Tamerton Foliot, Devon, was a British Conservative politician and agriculturalist.

== Life ==
Lopes was the eldest son of Sir Ralph Lopes, 2nd Baronet, by his wife Susan Ludlow, daughter of Abraham Ludlow. Henry Lopes, 1st Baron Ludlow, was his younger brother. His father, originally Ralph Franco, had succeeded to the estates and title of his uncle Sir Manasseh Masseh Lopes, 1st Baronet, in 1831, and assumed the same year the surname of Lopes in lieu of his patronymic. Both the Lopes and Franco families were of Sephardic-Jewish origins.

Lopes was educated at Winchester and Oriel College, Oxford. He unsuccessfully contested Westbury in 1853, but was returned to Parliament for the same constituency in 1857. In 1868, he was elected for Devonshire South, defeating Lord Amberley. In Parliament he was the member of a group including Henry Chaplin, Albert Pell and Clare Sewell Read, that supported farming interests, and was chairman of the Agricultural Business Committee. He was appointed High Sheriff of Devon for 1857.

In 1874, Lopes was appointed Civil Lord of the Admiralty in the second Conservative administration of Benjamin Disraeli, a post he held until the government fell in 1880. Bad health forced him to decline the post of Financial Secretary to the Treasury in 1877. His health also forced him to leave Parliament in 1885. The same year he was sworn of the Privy Council but declined a peerage. He was later an Alderman of the Devon County Council from 1888 to 1904. He was also for many years a director of the Great Western Railway. He was greatly interested in scientific farming, and completely rebuilt his Maristow estate.

Lopes married firstly Bertha, daughter of John Yarde-Buller, 1st Baron Churston. They had one son and two daughters. After her death in 1872, he married secondly Louisa, daughter of Sir Robert Newman, 1st Baronet. There were no children from this marriage. Lady Lopes died in April 1903. Lopes survived her by five years and died in January 1908, aged 89. He was succeeded in the baronetcy by his only son Henry, who was created Baron Roborough in 1938.

== Notes ==
Parliament of the United Kingdom
Preceded by James Wilson	Member of Parliament for Westbury; 1857–1868	Succeeded by John Lewis Phipps
Preceded by Sir Lawrence Palk; Samuel Trehawke Kekewich	Member of Parliament for Devonshire South; 1868–1885; With: Samuel Trehawke Kekewich 1868–1873; John Carpenter Garnier 1873–1884; John Tremayne 1884–1885	Constituency abolished
Political offices
Preceded by The Earl of Camperdown	Civil Lord of the Admiralty; 1874–1880	Succeeded by Thomas Brassey
Baronetage of the United Kingdom
Preceded by Ralph Lopes	Baronet (of Maristow); 1854–1908	Succeeded by Henry Yarde Buller Lopes
