= Massey Lopes, 2nd Baron Roborough =

British Baron (1903–1992)

The Right Honourable The Lord Roborough JP

Lord Lieutenant of Devon
- In office 1958–1978
- Preceded by: The Earl Fortescue
- Succeeded by: Sir Richard Hull

Personal details
- Born: Massey Henry Edgcumbe Lopes; 4 October 1903
- Died: 30 June 1992 (aged 88)
- Relations: William Edgcumbe, 4th Earl of Mount Edgcumbe (grandfather)
- Parent(s): Henry Lopes, 1st Baron Roborough; Lady Albertha Louise Florence Edgcumbe
- Education: Eton College
- Alma mater: Christ Church, Oxford

Massey Henry Edgcumbe Lopes, 2nd Baron Roborough, JP (4 October 1903 – 30 June 1992) of Maristow in the parish of Tamerton Foliot, Devon, was a British peer and officer of the British Army.

== Early life ==
Lopes was the only son of Henry Lopes, 1st Baron Roborough and Lady Albertha Louise Florence Edgcumbe, the daughter of William Edgcumbe, 4th Earl of Mount Edgcumbe and Katherine Elizabeth Hamilton. He was educated at Eton and Christ Church, Oxford, before joining the Royal Scots Greys in 1925.

== Career ==
From 1936 to 1937, Lopes was aide-de-camp to George Villiers, 6th Earl of Clarendon, the Governor-General of South Africa. He left the regiment in 1938, when he succeeded his father as Baron Roborough, but he rejoined in 1939 with the outbreak of the Second World War. Lopes served throughout the war, being twice wounded.

Lopes became Vice-Lieutenant of Devon in 1951, and then Lord Lieutenant of Devon in 1958, a post he held for the next twenty years. Among a number of posts, he served as a Justice of the Peace and a governor of Exeter University.

== Personal life ==
Lopes was married to Helen Dawson, only daughter of Lt.-Col. Edward Alfred Finch Dawson of Launde Abbey and the former Myra Battiscombe (eldest daughter of Maj. W.B. Battiscombe). Together, they were the parents of two sons and one daughter:

- Hon. Myra Bertha Ernestine Lopes (1937–1979)
- Henry Massey Lopes, 3rd Baron Roborough (1940–2015), who married Robyn Carol Zenda Bromwich, eldest daughter of John Bromwich, of Bacchus Marsh in Victoria, Australia, in 1968. They divorced in 1986 and he married, his first cousin once removed, Sarah Anne Pipon Baker (b. 1951), a daughter of Colin Harris Baker and Penelope Elizabeth Pipon (eldest daughter of Vice-Admiral Sir James Murray Pipon and Hon. Bertha Lopes, a daughter of Henry Lopes, 1st Baron Roborough) in 1986.
  - Massey Lopes, 4th Baron Roborough
    - Henry Massey Peter Lopes
    - Ralph George Franco Lopes
    - Olivia Jean Sorell Lopes
- Hon. George Edward Lopes (b. 1945), who married Hon. Sarah Violet Astor, daughter of Gavin Astor, 2nd Baron Astor of Hever and Lady Irene Haig.
  - Harry Lopes, who married Laura Parker Bowles.
    - Eliza Lopes
    - Gus Lopes
    - Louis Lopes

Lord Roborough died on 30 June 1992.

=== Descendants ===
Through his son George, he was a grandfather of Harry Marcus George Lopes (b. 1977), who was married on 6 May 2006 to Laura Parker Bowles, daughter of Andrew Parker Bowles and Camilla Shand (later Queen Camilla after her wedding to King Charles III), at St. Cyriac's Church, Lacock, Wiltshire.

== Coat of arms ==
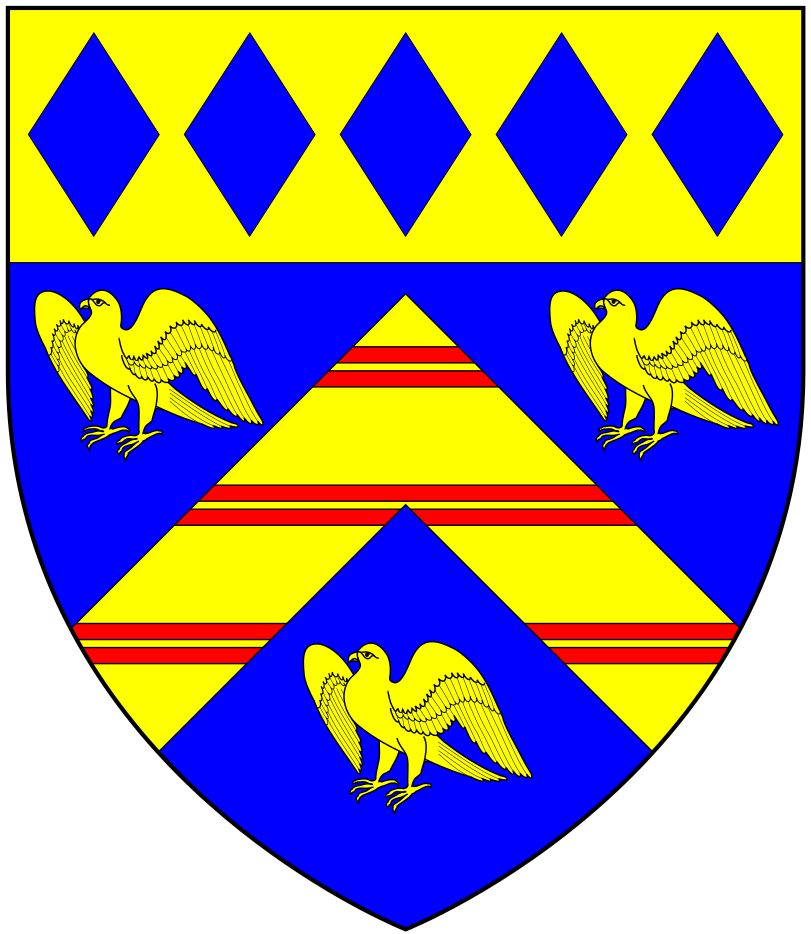

The Arms of Lopes, as granted to Manasseh Masseh Lopes, are blazoned Azure, a chevron or charged with three bars gemelles gules between three eagles rising of the second on a chief of the second five lozenges of the first

Honorary titles
Preceded by The Earl Fortescue	Lord Lieutenant of Devon; 1958–1978	Succeeded by Sir Richard Hull
Peerage of the United Kingdom
Preceded by Henry Lopes	Baron Roborough; 1938–1992	Succeeded by Henry Massey Lopes
