= Charles Leslie Courtenay =

English clergyman

Rev. Hon. Charles Leslie Courtenay (31 March 1816 – 29 October 1894) was an English clergyman who was Canon of Windsor from 1859 to 1894.

He was the fourth son of William Courtenay, 10th Earl of Devon.

He was educated at Christ Church, Oxford and graduated BA in 1837 and MA in 1840. He was appointed Vicar of Bovey Tracey in 1849 and was chaplain-in-ordinary to Queen Victoria, 1843–1849.

In 1849, he married Lady Caroline Margaret, daughter of John Somers-Cocks, 2nd Earl Somers.

He was appointed to the fifth stall in St George's Chapel, Windsor Castle in 1859, a position he held until he died in 1894. He died in Bovey Tracey after a two-day illness.
