= Lawrence Palk, 1st Baron Haldon =

British politician (1818–1883)

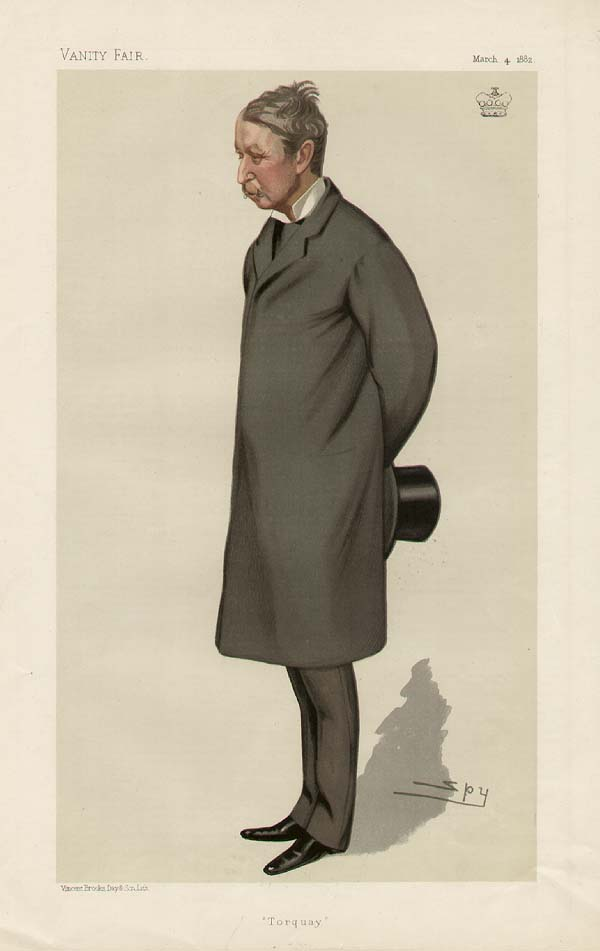
"Torquay" Lord Haldon as caricatured by Spy (Leslie Ward) in Vanity Fair, March 1882

Lawrence Palk, 1st Baron Haldon (5 January 1818 – 23 March 1883), known as Sir Lawrence Palk, 4th Baronet from 1860 to 1880, was a British Conservative Party politician.

== Biography ==
Born in London, he was the son of Sir Lawrence Palk, 3rd Baronet and his first wife Anna Eleanora Wrey, daughter of Sir Bourchier Wrey, 7th Baronet. Palk was educated at Eton College in Berkshire. In 1860, he succeeded his father as baronet. Palk entered the British House of Commons for South Devon in 1854 and sat for the constituency until 1868. Subsequently, he represented East Devon to 1880. After his retirement from politics, he was elevated to the Peerage of the United Kingdom as Baron Haldon, of Haldon, in the County of Devon on 29 May 1880.

Having served for a while as an officer in 1st The Royal Dragoons, Palk became Lieutenant-Colonel commanding the 1st Administrative Brigade, Devonshire Artillery Volunteers on 2 September 1863, and Honorary Colonel in 1868, when his son Lawrence (formerly an officer in the Scots Fusilier Guards) became a Major in the unit.

On 15 May 1845, he married Maria Harriett Hesketh, daughter of Sir Thomas Hesketh, 4th Baronet in Rufford, Lancashire. They had six children, four sons and two daughters.

From 1878 to 1882, he was master of the South Devon Hunt.

His oldest son Lawrence succeeded to the titles. In 1938, the barony reverted to the youngest son Edward, after whose death one year later it became extinct.

Parliament of the United Kingdom
Preceded by Sir Ralph Lopes, Bt; Sir John Buller Yarde-Buller, Bt	Member of Parliament for South Devon; 1854 – 1868; With: Sir John Buller Yarde-Buller, Bt 1854–1858; Samuel Trehawke Kekewich 1858–1868	Succeeded by Samuel Trehawke Kekewich; Sir Massey Lopes, Bt
New constituency	Member of Parliament for East Devon; 1868 – 1880; With: Lord Courtenay 1868–1870; Sir John Kennaway, Bt 1870–1880	Succeeded by William Hood Walrond; Sir John Kennaway, Bt
Peerage of the United Kingdom
New creation	Baron Haldon; 1880–1883	Succeeded by Lawrence Palk
Baronetage of Great Britain
Preceded by Lawrence Palk	Baronet (of Haldon House); 1860–1883	Succeeded by Lawrence Palk
