= William Courtenay, 10th Earl of Devon =

British politician and aristocrat

The Right Honourable The Earl of Devon

Member of Parliament for Exeter
- In office 6 October 1812 – January 1826
- Preceded by: Sir Charles Bampfylde
- Succeeded by: Samuel Trehawke Kekewich

Personal details
- Born: William Courtenay; 19 June 1777 London
- Died: 19 March 1859 (aged 81) Beckett Park, Berkshire
- Party: Conservative
- Spouses: Lady Harriet Leslie Pepys (m. 1804; died 1839) Elizabeth Ruth Scott (m. 1849)
- Children: William Courtenay, 11th Earl of Devon; Henry Courtenay, 13th Earl of Devon; Charles Leslie Courtenay
- Parent(s): Bishop Henry Courtenay; Lady Elizabeth Howard
- Education: Westminster School
- Alma mater: Christ Church, Oxford
- Occupation: Clerk Assistant to the House of Lords (1826-35)

William Courtenay, 10th Earl of Devon (19 June 1777 – 19 March 1859) was a 19th-century British aristocrat and politician, who sat in the Commons before entering the House of Lords after succeeding to the title of Earl of Devon in 1835.

== Life ==
He was born on 19 June 1777, the eldest son of Dr Henry Reginald Courtenay, Bishop of Exeter and his wife Lady Elizabeth Howard, daughter of Lieut-Gen Thomas Howard, 2nd Earl of Effingham.

Courtenay was educated at Westminster School before going up to Christ Church, Oxford. He was called to the bar at Lincoln's Inn in 1799, and served from 1817 until 1826 as a Master-in-Chancery.

Returned as Member of Parliament for Exeter from 1812 until January 1826, he resigned his seat upon appointment as Assistant Clerk to the House of Lords, at an annual salary of £4,000, and was pleased to assist his cousin, Viscount Courtenay, establish his right, in 1831, to the ancient family earldom before the Parliamentary Committee of Privileges. He stayed in post until May 1835, when he succeeded his second cousin as 10th Earl of Devon, as well as inheriting Powderham Castle in Devon and estates in Ireland. He was elected High Steward of Oxford University in 1838, and was also a governor of Charterhouse.

In 1843, British prime minister, Sir Robert Peel, asked him to chair a commission on Irish land tenure. The resulting report by the Devon Commission was published in 1845.

== Sporting career ==
Courtenay is known to have played in one cricket match in 1797, scoring a single run in his two innings.

== Family ==
He was married twice, firstly to Harriet Leslie Pepys, daughter of Sir Lucas Pepys and his first wife Jane Elizabeth Leslie, 12th Countess of Rothes, and secondly to Elizabeth Scott, daughter of Rev. John Scott of County Wicklow. Lord Devon was succeeded in the family titles by his eldest son, who was appointed a Cabinet member and a Privy Counsellor. His second son, Hon. and Revd Prebendary Henry Courtenay succeeded his nephew as 13th earl, while his fourth and youngest surviving son, Hon. and Revd Canon Leslie Courtenay, served as Domestic Chaplain to Queen Victoria before becoming a Canon of Windsor.

== Death ==
Lord Devon died at Shrivenham, then in Berkshire, while visiting his brother-in-law, Ven. Edward Berens, Archdeacon of Berkshire, on 19 March 1859.

== See also ==
- House of Courtenay
- Courtenay baronets

== Bibliography ==
- Haygarth, Arthur (1862). Scores & Biographies, Volume 1 (1744–1826). Lillywhite.
- Burke's Peerage & Baronetage

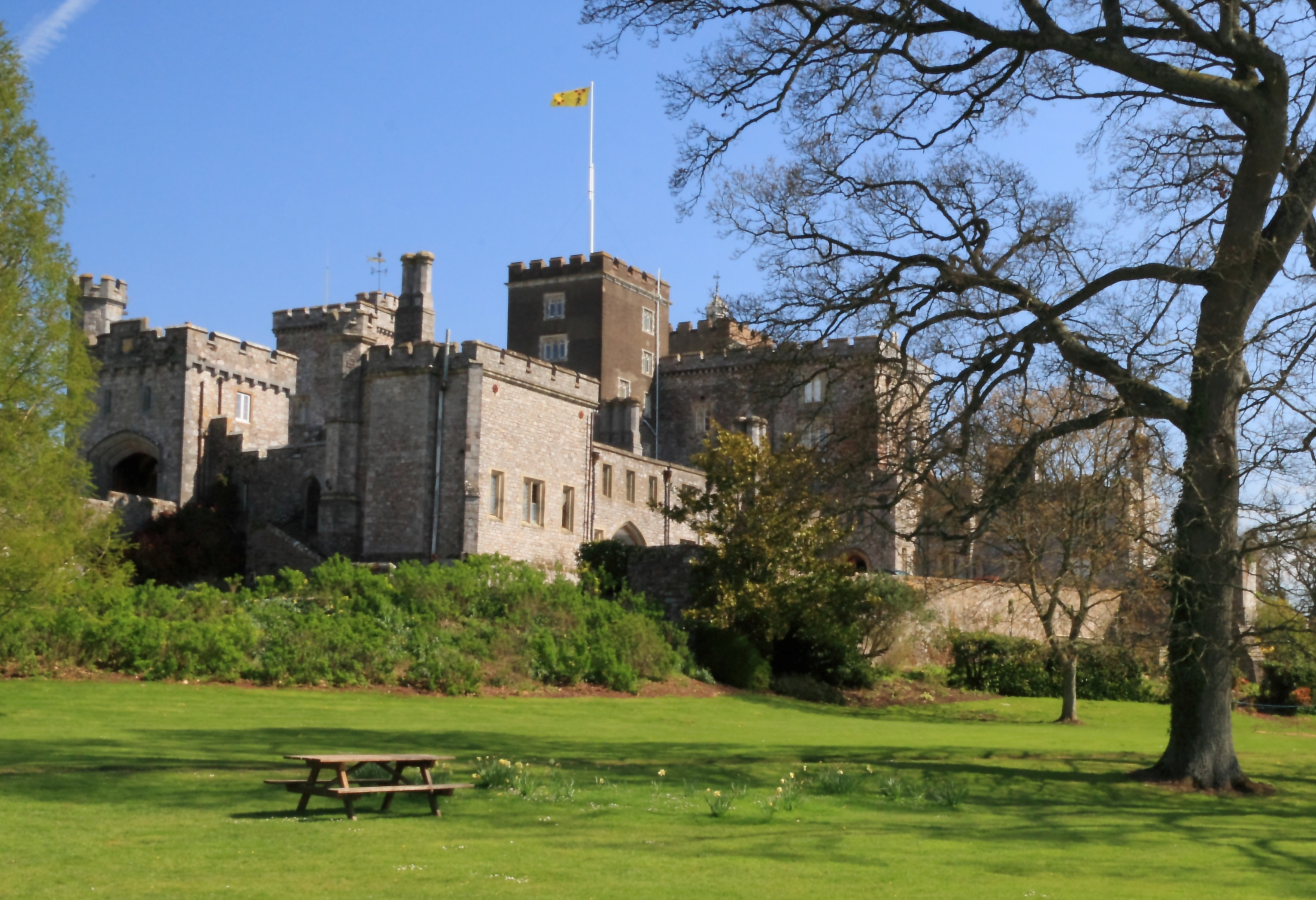
Powderham Castle, the ancestral seat

Parliament of the United Kingdom
| Preceded by Sir Charles Bampfylde; James Buller | Member of Parliament for Exeter; 1812–1826; With: James Buller (1812-1818); Robert William Newman (1818-1826) | Succeeded by Samuel Trehawke Kekewich; Robert William Newman |
Peerage of England
| Preceded by William Courtenay | Earl of Devon; 1835-1859 | Succeeded by William Reginald Courtenay |
