= John Yarde-Buller, 1st Baron Churston =

British Conservative politician

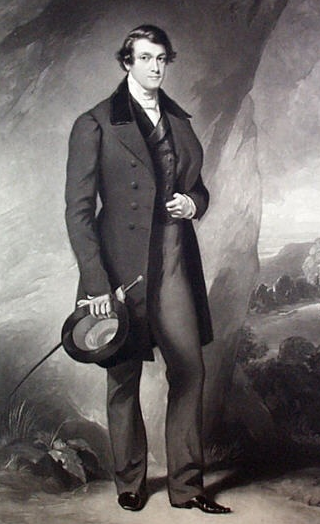
Sir John Buller-Yarde-Buller, by Sir Francis Grant, 1840s

Arms of 1st Baron Churston impaling Newman of Mamhead for his second wife, stained glass, Churston Ferrers Church

John Yarde-Buller, 1st Baron Churston (12 April 1799 – 4 September 1871) was a British Conservative politician.

== Origins ==
Born John Buller-Yarde-Buller, he was the eldest son of Sir Francis Buller-Yarde-Buller, 2nd Baronet (1767–1833) by his wife Elizabeth Holliday, only daughter and sole heiress of John Holliday of Dilhorne Hall in the parish of Dilhorne, Staffordshire.

== Career ==
In 1833 he inherited his father's baronetcy and entered Parliament two years later as Member of Parliament for South Devon. He held the seat for almost twenty-four years and on his retirement in 1858, was raised to the peerage as Baron Churston, of Churston Ferrers and Lupton, Co. Devon. In 1860, he changed the family name to Yarde-Buller. He served as Lieutenant-Colonel of the South Devon Militia and became its commanding officer in 1852 when the post of Colonel of the Regiment was abolished. His son the Hon John Buller Yarde-Buller also served in the regiment and succeeded him in command.

== Marriages and children ==
Lord Churston married twice:

- Firstly on 24 January 1823 to Elizabeth Wilson-Patten (d.1857), a daughter of Thomas Wilson-Patten of Bank Hall in Lancashire, and a sister of John Wilson-Patten, 1st Baron Winmarleigh, by whom he had two children:
  - Hon. John Yarde-Buller (1823–1867), a soldier, who predeceased his father;
  - Hon. Bertha Yarde-Buller (died 1872), who married Sir Massey Lopes, Bt.
- Secondly in 1861 he married Caroline Newman (d.1866), 2nd daughter of Sir Robert Newman, 1st Baronet (1776–1848) of Mamhead House in Devon.

== Death and succession ==
Lord Churston died in 1871 and his titles passed to his eldest grandson, John Yarde-Buller, 2nd Baron Churston.

== Notes ==
Parliament of the United Kingdom
| Preceded by Lord John Russell; John Bulteel | Member of Parliament for South Devon; 1835 – 1858; With: Montague Parker 1835–1841; Lord Courtenay 1841–1849; Sir Ralph Lopes, Bt 1849–1854; Sir Lawrence Palk, Bt 1854–1858 | Succeeded by Samuel Trehawke Kekewich; Sir Lawrence Palk, Bt |
Peerage of the United Kingdom
| New creation | Baron Churston; 1858–1871 | Succeeded by John Yarde-Buller |
Baronetage of Great Britain
| Preceded by Francis Buller-Yarde-Buller | Baronet (of Churston Court); 1833–1871 | Succeeded by John Yarde-Buller |
