= Montague Parker (MP) =

British politician

Montague Edmund Newcombe Parker (1807 – 1 July 1858) was a British politician.

Parker stood in the 1835 South Devon by-election for the Conservative Party. At the election, he defeated the Home Secretary John Russell, 1st Earl Russell. He held the seat at the 1837 UK general election, and stood down in 1841.

In 1849/50, Parker served as Sheriff of Devon. He lived at Whiteway House, near Chudleigh, where he died in 1858, aged 51.

Parliament of the United Kingdom
Preceded by Lord John Russell; John Yarde-Buller	Member of Parliament for South Devon; 1835 – 1841; With: John Yarde-Buller	Succeeded by William Courtenay; John Yarde-Buller
