= Arthur Kekewich =

English High Court judge

Sir Arthur Kekewich
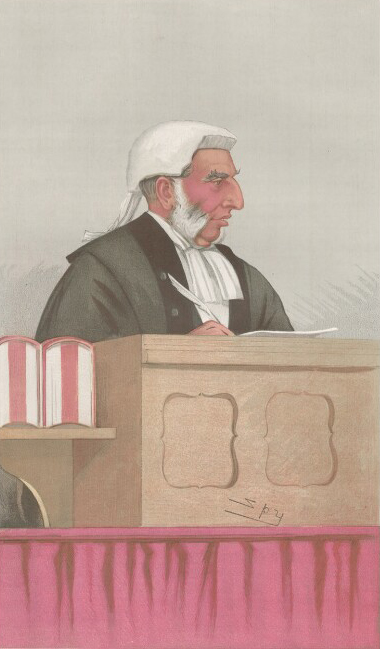
- "A hasty Judge", caricature in Vanity Fair, 1895

Justice of the High Court
- In office 12 November 1886 – 22 November 1907
- Preceded by: Sir James Bacon
- Succeeded by: Sir Harry Eve

Personal details
- Born: 26 July 1832 Peamore, Exeter
- Died: 22 November 1907 (aged 75) London
- Spouse: Marianne Freshfield (m. 1858)
- Children: 7
- Education: Balliol College, Oxford

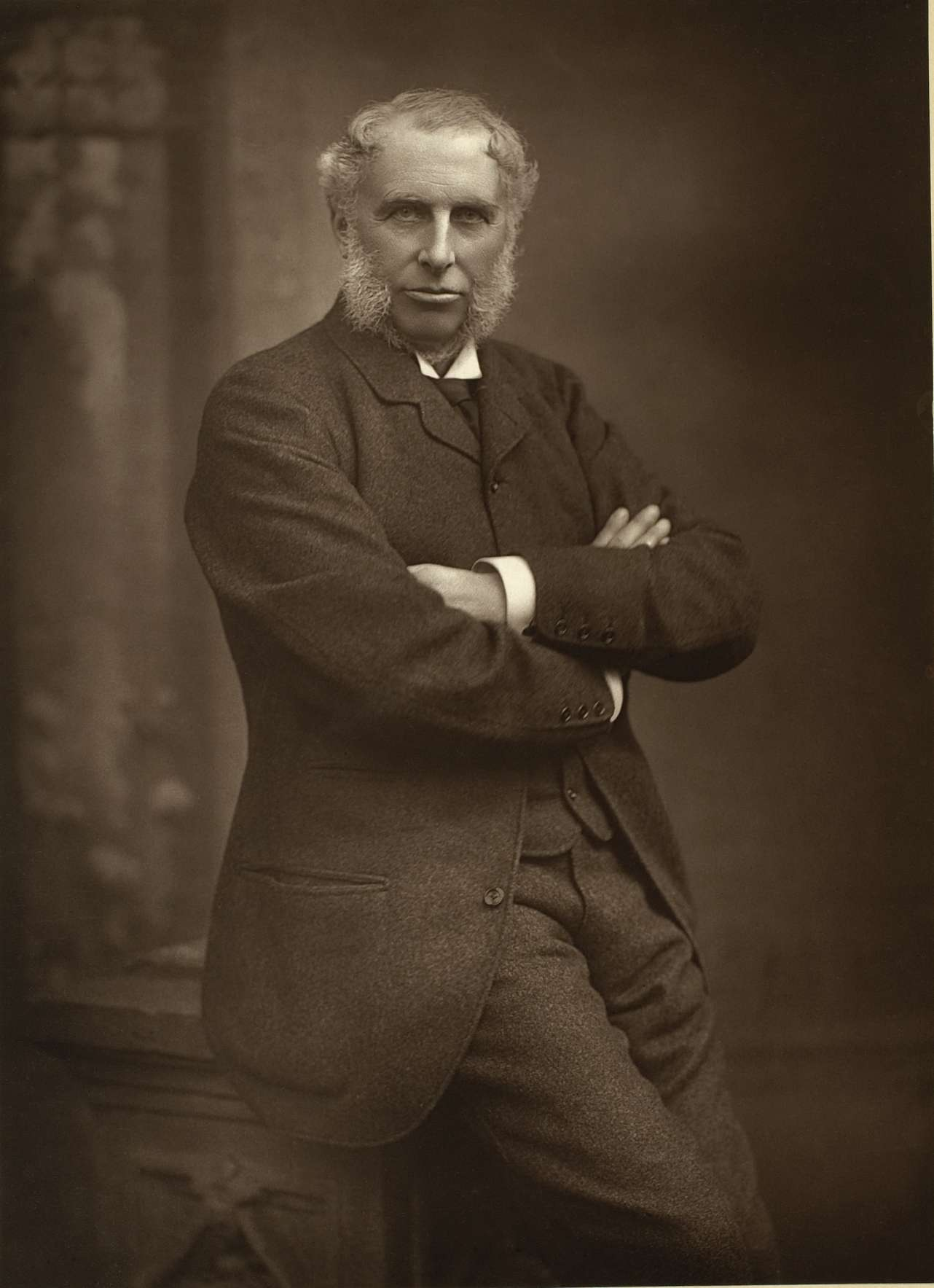
Sir Arthur Kekewich

Sir Arthur Kekewich (26 July 1832 – 22 November 1907) was an English barrister and High Court judge. The frequency at which his opinions were appealed has given rise to many stories, though according to a modern assessment he "seems to have been a man who has suffered unfairly in the public reputation and [his] appointment was one which was unlucky rather than discreditable."

== Early life and career ==
Kekewich was born at Peamore, near Exeter, to an old Devonshire family. He was the second son of Samuel Trehawke Kekewich of Peamore House, the Member of Parliament for Exeter in 1826 and for South Devon in 1858, by his first wife Agatha Maria Sophia, daughter of John Langston of Sarsden, Oxfordshire. His elder brother was Trehawke Kekewich (1823–1909), who inherited the family estate, and his younger half-brother was Sir George William Kekewich, the first permanent secretary of the Board of Education and MP for Exeter (1906–10). Sir Trehawke Kekewich, Bt. (1851–1932), the long-standing Recorder of Tiverton, and Major-General Sir Robert Kekewich, CB, the defender of Kimberley, were his nephews.

Educated at Eton and at Balliol College, Oxford, where he matriculated on 11 March 1850, Kekewich was placed in the second class by the mathematical moderators in 1852, and graduated BA in 1854 with a first class in literæ humaniores and a second in the final school of mathematics. In the same year he was elected to a fellowship at Exeter College, which he held until his marriage on 23 September 1858, with Marianne, daughter of the lawyer James William Freshfield, founder of the law firm of Freshfields. He proceeded to the MA in 1856.

Having entered as a student at Lincoln's Inn on 8 November 1854, he was called to the bar on 7 June 1858. His connection through his wife with the firm of Freshfield & Son, solicitors, gave him an excellent start, and brought him at an early period in his professional career the post of junior standing counsel to the Bank of England; for many years he was in the enjoyment of one of the largest junior practices at the Chancery bar. He was made QC on 4 May 1877, and a bencher of his inn on 4 July 1881.

Though he possessed a sound knowledge of law and practice, he proved deficient in the qualities of a leader. He never obtained a firm footing in any one of the chancery courts, and his business dwindled to very modest proportions. He unsuccessfully contested, in the Conservative interest, Coventry in 1880 and Barnstaple in 1885.

== Judicial career ==
There was some surprise when on the retirement of Vice-Chancellor Bacon, in November 1886, Kekewich was appointed by Lord Halsbury to fill the vacancy in the Chancery Division of the High Court, and he was knighted early in the following year. On the bench Kekewich showed an expedition and despatch not usually associated with proceedings in Chancery; he had a thorough knowledge of the minutiæ of equity practice, and was especially conversant with the details arising out of the administration of estates in chancery. But his quickness of perception and his celerity in decision were apt to impair the accuracy of his judgments, and he failed to keep sufficiently in control a natural tendency to exuberance of speech. Most kindly and courteous in private life, he was apt to be irritable on the bench.

Kekewich's judgments were appealed against with uncomplimentary frequency, and though he was occasionally upheld by the House of Lords, he was reversed in the Court of Appeal to an extent which would have been disconcerting to a judge of less sanguine temperament. There is an apocryphal story of a counsel opening his appeal by saying "If your Lordships please, this is an appeal from a decision by Mr Justice Kekewich; but there are also other grounds for the appeal." Another apocryphal story has Kekewich's children being told by their nurse "Jam for tea today, children! Your father has been upheld by the Court of Appeal!"

Several of his juniors on the bench were promoted over his head to the Court of Appeal; but by the legal profession his shrewdness, sense of duty, and determination to administer justice with the minimum of delay were fully recognised.

He died after a very short illness on 22 November 1907 at his house in Devonshire Place; there were no arrears in his court, and he had sent, a day or two before his death, his only two reserved judgments to be read by one of his colleagues. He was buried at Exminster near Exeter. Kekewich was a strong churchman and Conservative. A man of fine physique and active habits, a keen shot and fisherman, he became in his later years an enthusiastic golf-player. His wife with two sons and five daughters survived him.

== Decisions ==
Reported decisions by Mr Justice Kekewich included:

- Ideal Bedding v Holland [1907] 2 Ch 157 on the Statute of Elizabeth
- Baschet v London Illustrated Standard Company [1900] 1 Ch 73 on copyright in the conflict of laws
- Union Bank v Munster (1887) 37 Ch D 51

== Arms ==
Coat of arms of Arthur Kekewich

Motto
Fructus Virtutis
