= Ralph Lopes =

British Member of Parliament (MP)

Sir Ralph Lopes Bt

Member of Parliament for Southern Devon
- In office 1849–1854

Member of Parliament for Westbury
- In office 1831-1837; 1841–1847

Member of Parliament for Westbury
- In office 1814–1819

Personal details
- Born: Ralph Franco; 10 September 1788
- Died: 23 January 1854 (aged 65)
- Party: Tory (before 1831); Whig (1831-1835); Conservative (after 1835)
- Children: 2+, including Massey and Henry
- Relatives: Manasseh Lopes (uncle)

Sir Ralph Lopes, 2nd Baronet (10 September 1788 – 23 January 1854), of Maristow in the parish of Tamerton Foliot, Devon, was a British Member of Parliament (MP).

== Biography ==
Lopes was born as Ralph Franco. His uncle, Manasseh Masseh Lopes, an MP and borough owner, was created a baronet in 1805, with a special remainder to his nephew. Ralph entered Parliament in 1814 as member for Westbury, a pocket borough controlled by his uncle, for which he initially sat until 1819. On his uncle's death in 1831 he inherited both the baronetcy and his estate, a condition of which was that he change his surname to Lopes. Included in the estate was the right to nominate the MPs at Westbury (though this did not survive the Great Reform Act of the following year), and he resumed his seat for the borough. Although he had originally sat as a Tory like his uncle, he now expressed his support for the Reform Bill and sat with the Whigs.

Having been three times elected unopposed, Lopes switched his loyalties during the 1835 Parliament from the Whigs back to the Conservatives, and at the 1837 election a Whig candidate stood against him and defeated him, by the narrow margin of 98 votes to 96. However, at the next election, in 1841, Lopes was once again elected unopposed, this time as a Conservative. In 1847 he stood down in Westbury, not contesting the election, but two years later he returned to the Commons at a by-election for the Southern Devon county division. He held this seat until his death in 1854.

His older son, Sir Massey Lopes, succeeded him as baronet; a younger son, Henry Lopes, 1st Baron Ludlow, served in Parliament and later as a Lord Justice of Appeal before being granted a peerage in 1897.

== Arms ==
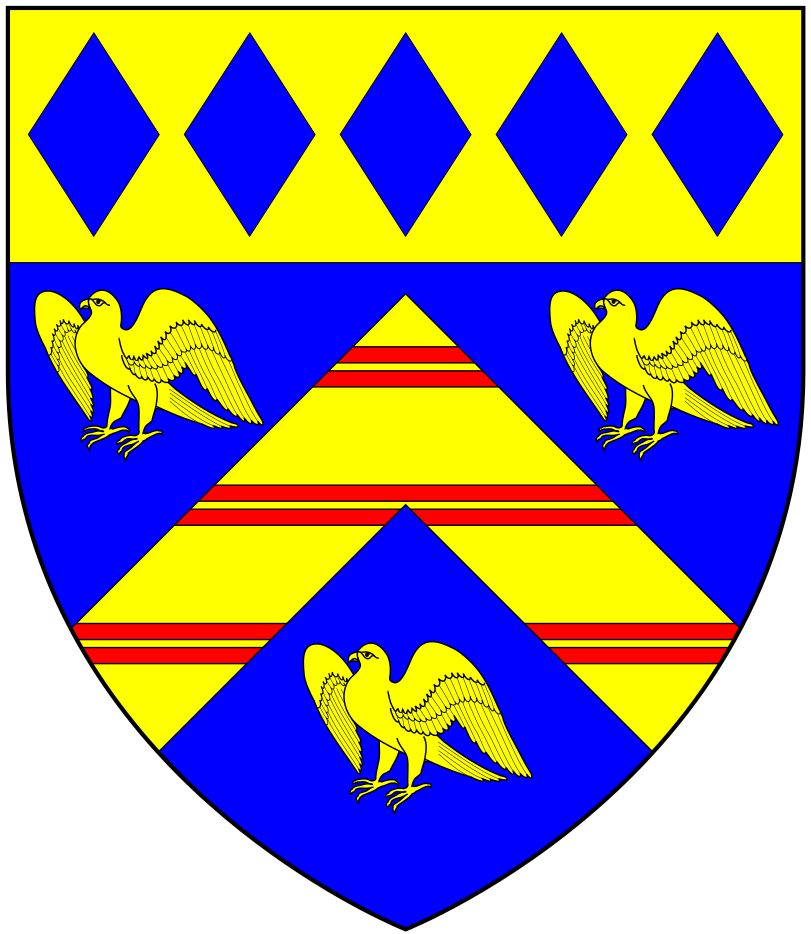
Arms of Lopes:

Lopes adopted the coat of arms granted to his uncle Manasseh Lopes, blazoned Azure, a chevron or charged with three bars gemelles gules between three eagles rising of the second on a chief of the second five lozenges of the first.

Parliament of the United Kingdom
Preceded by Benjamin Hall; Benjamin Shaw	Member of Parliament for Westbury; 1814–1819; With: Benjamin Shaw 1814–1818; Lord Francis Conyngham 1818–1819	Succeeded by William Leader Maberly; Lord Francis Conyngham
Preceded by Sir Alexander Cray Grant; Michael George Prendergast	Member of Parliament for Westbury; 1831–1837; With: Henry Hanmer 1831; Henry Frederick Stephenson 1831–1832	Succeeded by John Ivatt Briscoe
Preceded by John Ivatt Briscoe	Member of Parliament for Westbury; 1841–1847	Succeeded by James Wilson
Preceded by Lord Courtenay; Sir John Yarde-Buller	Member of Parliament for Southern Devon; 1849–1854; With: Sir John Yarde-Buller	Succeeded by Sir Lawrence Palk; Sir John Yarde-Buller
Baronetage of the United Kingdom
Preceded by Manasseh Masseh Lopes	Baronet (of Maristow); 1805–1831	Succeeded by Massey Lopes
