= Caroline Voaden =

British Liberal Democrat politician

Caroline Voaden MP
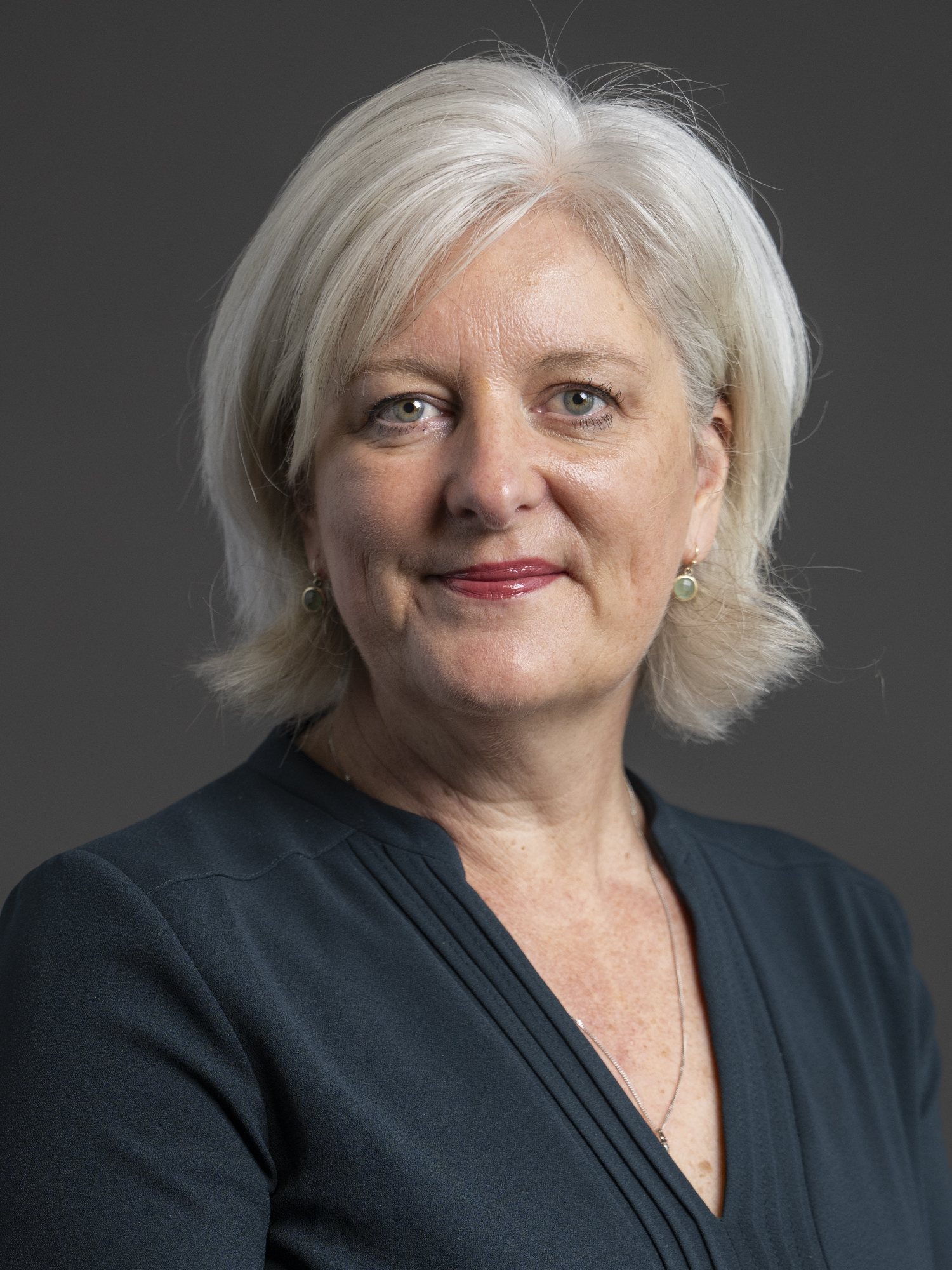
- Official portrait, 2024

Member of Parliament for South Devon
- Incumbent
- Assumed office 4 July 2024
- Preceded by: Anthony Mangnall (Totnes (Note: The Totnes constituency was renamed "South Devon" at the 2024 general election, with minor boundary changes))
- Majority: 7,127 (14.5%)

Liberal Democrat spokesperson for Schools
- Incumbent
- Assumed office 1 October 2025
- Leader: Ed Davey

Member of the European Parliament for South West England
- In office 2 July 2019 – 31 January 2020
- Preceded by: Julie Girling
- Succeeded by: Constituency abolished

Leader of the Liberal Democrats in the European Parliament
- In office 12 November 2019 – 31 January 2020
- Deputy: Luisa Porritt
- Leader: Jo Swinson; Sir Ed Davey and Brinton/Pack (interim)
- Preceded by: Catherine Bearder
- Succeeded by: Position abolished

Personal details
- Born: Caroline Jane Voaden; 22 November 1968 (age 57) Wantage, Berkshire, England
- Party: Liberal Democrats
- Education: University of Sheffield (BA)
- Website: www.carolinevoaden.com

Caroline Jane Voaden (born 22 November 1968) is a British politician and international journalist, who has served as Member of Parliament for South Devon since 2024 for the Liberal Democrats, having previously served as the party's leader in the European Parliament from 2019 to 2020, and was a Member of the European Parliament (MEP) for the South West England and Gibraltar constituency from 2019 to 2020.

Voaden has covered six European countries in her capacity as a journalist. Whilst covering the latter years of the Yugoslav Wars in Zagreb, she made history as the youngest female bureau chief at Reuters.

== Personal life ==
Caroline Voaden was born in Wantage in Berkshire, (Note: In Oxfordshire since 1974) on 22 November 1968, and grew up in Scotland. She studied French and Economics at Sheffield University, with a year abroad living in Lille. In 2007, after being widowed at the age of 34, Voaden moved to Devon with her two young daughters. She married again and has a stepson.

== Professional career ==
From 1991 to 2000, Voaden worked for the Reuters news agency, undergoing assignments in Amsterdam, Dublin, Bonn, Belgrade and Zagreb.

In 2007, she moved to Devon, where she founded her own modern craft brand in 2012. In 2018 she became operations manager at a resettlement charity working with offenders and prisoners from HM Prison Channings Wood.

Voaden was chair of the national WAY Foundation from 2009 to 2011, a charity that supports men and women widowed under the age of 50.

From 2000 to 2007, she served in the team which established JustGiving, as an online editor for the charitable social platform.

From November 2021 to May 2023 she was the chief executive of Devon Rape Crisis and Sexual Abuse Services.

== Political career ==
Voaden joined the Liberal Democrats the day after the Brexit referendum in 2016, seeking to oppose Brexit and campaign for a second referendum on EU membership.

=== European Parliament ===
In 2019, Voaden was elected as Member of the European Parliament for the South West of England constituency, having campaigned on a platform of stopping Brexit and fighting climate change.

She sat as a full member of the European Parliament Committee on the Environment, Public Health and Food Safety, a substitute member of the Committee on Transport and Tourism and the Vice-President of the European Parliament's delegation for relations with the Arabian Peninsula. Voaden featured on BBC television's Question Time in October 2019.

In November 2019, Catherine Bearder announced, that she would be stepping down as the leader of the Liberal Democrats in the European Parliament. Voaden was subsequently elected as the leader of the European party.

She was a member of the Renew Europe group in the European Parliament. Her name was removed after Brexit.

=== House of Commons ===
She stood against Gary Streeter as the Liberal Democrat candidate for the South West Devon constituency in the 2017 General Election, coming third with 5.2% of the vote.

In 2024, she won the "South Devon Primary" to be the Liberal Democrat candidate in the new South Devon constituency, which was effectively a renamed version of the abolished Totnes constituency with minor boundary changes. In the 2024 general election, she was elected Member of Parliament (MP) for South Devon with 22,540 votes (46.0%) and a majority of 7,127 over Anthony Mangnall, the incumbent Conservative MP for Totnes.

Following the Liberal Democrat Conference in Bournemouth in September 2025, Voaden was appointed Schools Spokesperson on the frontbench team of Ed Davey.
