= WAY Widowed and Young =

British bereavement support charity

- Abbreviation: WAY
- Formation: 1997
- Founder: Caroline Sarll
- Type: Charity
- Registration no.: 1164988
- Legal status: Charitable incorporated organisation
- Purpose: Support and advocacy for younger widowed people
- Region served: United Kingdom
- Members: Over 4,400
- Website: www.widowedandyoung.org.uk
- Formerly called: WAY Foundation

WAY Widowed and Young (formerly the WAY Foundation) is a UK charity that provides peer support, information and advice for people widowed aged 50 and younger. Founded in 1997 by Journalist Caroline Sarll, the charity supports members in England, Scotland, Wales and Northern Ireland through online communities, local groups, social events and other peer support services.

The charity has campaigned on issues affecting younger bereaved people, including bereavement benefits and birth registration law for children whose parent dies before they are born. It has contributed evidence to parliamentary inquiries and its work has been covered by national media.

== History ==
WAY was founded in 1997 as the WAY Foundation. The charity was established in response to the lack of support available to younger widowed people. It was inspired by the experiences of her mother, widowed by the death of her husband Alan, and her sister, widowed by the death of her husband Charlie, as well as by Sarll's own lifelong, complicated grief as a bereaved child.

The organisation adopted the name WAY Widowed and Young in 2013.

The organisation subsequently became a registered charitable incorporated organisation and is registered with the Charity Commission for England and Wales under charity number 1164988.

== Activities ==
WAY provides peer support and information for people aged 50 or under when their partner has died. Support is provided through online communities, local groups, social events, telephone support and information resources. Membership is open regardless of marital status, sexual orientation or gender identity, including people who were married, engaged, cohabiting, separated or divorced at the time of their partner's death.

The charity has been described by The Guardian as providing a nationwide peer-support network for younger widowed people through local groups and online communities.

In 2024, researchers at Northumbria University worked with WAY, alongside other bereavement organisations, on a study examining the long-term impact of widowhood during and following the COVID-19 pandemic. WAY assisted in arranging focus groups involving people willing to share their experiences.

== Campaigning and public policy ==
WAY campaigns on issues affecting younger bereaved people, including bereavement benefits, financial support for widowed families and legal recognition for surviving cohabiting partners.

WAY submitted written evidence to the Work and Pensions Committee's inquiry into support for the bereaved in May 2019, calling for the duration of Bereavement Support Payment to be extended beyond 18 months and for eligibility to be extended to unmarried cohabiting partners.

WAY has also supported wider campaigns seeking changes to Bereavement Support Payment, including the successful extension of eligibility to unmarried cohabiting partners in 2023. The charity's continuing advocacy on benefit adjustments has received ongoing reporting via BBC News.

WAY is among a number of bereavement organisations supporting Widows' Fight, an independent campaign seeking reforms to Bereavement Support Payment, including extending payments beyond 18 months and uprating them in line with inflation.

The charity has also supported individual legal challenges affecting its members, including the case of Daniel Jwanczuk, a widower who challenged the Department for Work and Pensions over the refusal of Bereavement Support Payment following the death of his wife, whose lifelong disability had prevented her from making the qualifying National Insurance contributions. Jwanczuk, whom WAY supported following his wife's death, won his case at both the High Court in 2022 and the Court of Appeal in 2023, before the Supreme Court ultimately allowed the Secretary of State's appeal in 2025. WAY's Chief Executive, Stephanie Patrick, said the charity would continue to campaign on behalf of Jwanczuk and other young widowed people in similar circumstances.

WAY's Blank Space campaign, which calls for a clearer legal process allowing unmarried bereaved mothers to register a deceased partner as their child's parent on the birth certificate, was raised in the House of Commons in February 2025 by Caroline Voaden MP, a former chair of the charity, during an adjournment debate. The campaign subsequently informed the Registration of Births (Inclusion of Deceased Parents) Bill, a private member's bill introduced in the House of Commons on 17 June 2025 by Jen Craft MP and co-sponsored by Voaden and others, which would create a process for registrars to include a deceased parent's details on a birth certificate.

== Governance ==
WAY is governed by a board of trustees and supported by operational management staff alongside a localised network of volunteers. According to the Charity Commission for England and Wales, the charity reported 187 volunteers and seven trustees for the financial year ending 31 December 2024.

== See also ==
- Bereavement
- Widow
- Widower
- Grief
