= Robert Kekewich =

British Army general

Major-General Robert Kekewich CB
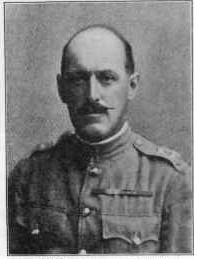
- Born: 17 June 1854
- Died: 5 November 1914 (aged 60)
- Military career
- Allegiance: United Kingdom
- Branch: British Army
- Service years: 1874 – 1914
- Rank: Major-General
- Conflicts: Third Anglo-Burmese War; Second Boer War
- Awards: Companion of the Order of the Bath

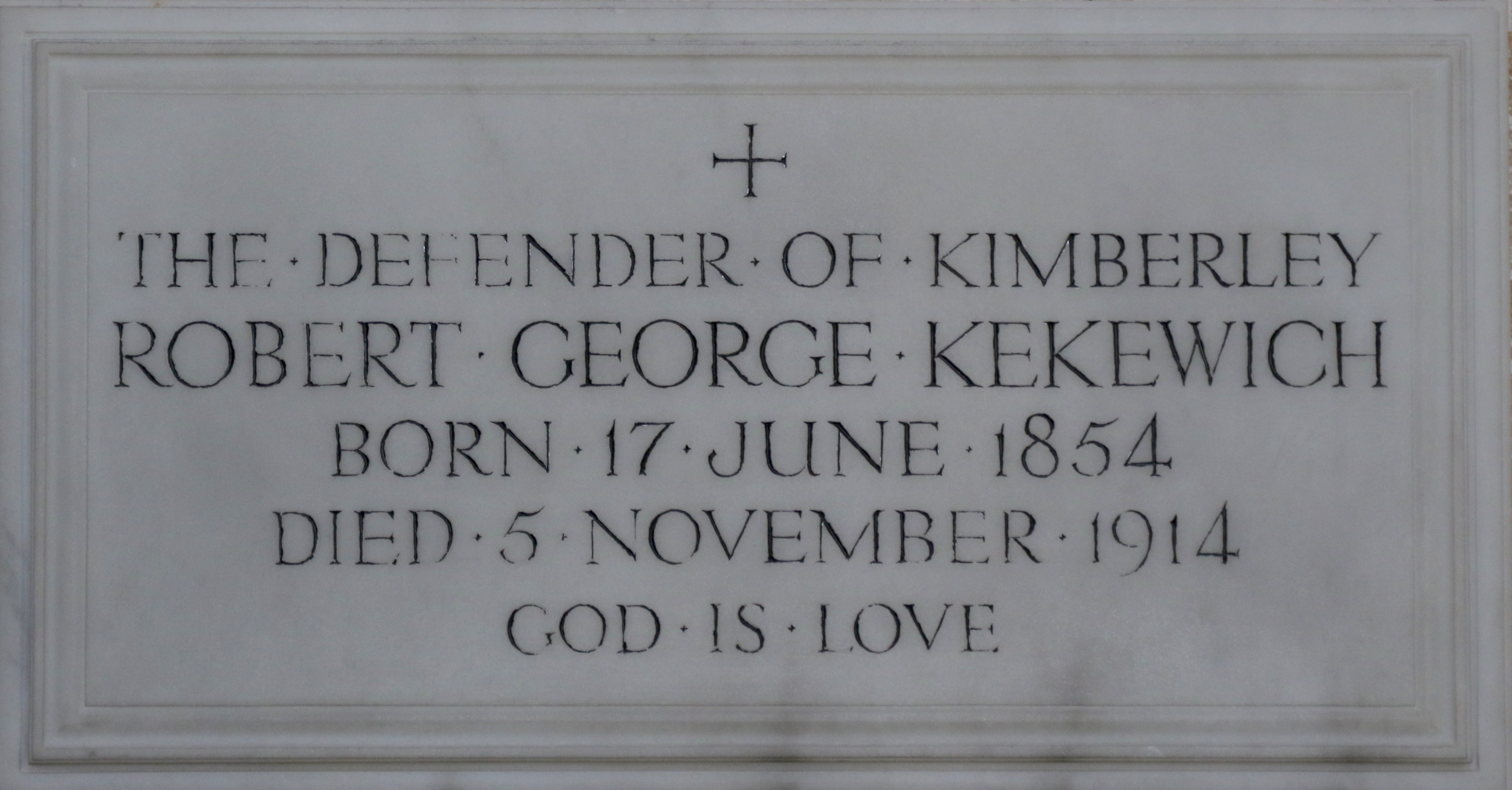
Memorial in Exeter Cathedral

Major-General Robert George Kekewich, CB (17 June 1854 – 5 November 1914) was a British Army officer who saw service in four wars.

== Early life ==
Kekewich was the second son of Trehawke Kekewich, of Peamore House, near Exeter, Devon, and the grandson of Samuel Trehawke Kekewich. He was also the brother of Sir Trehawke Herbert Kekewich, 1st Baronet and the nephew of the judge Sir Arthur Kekewich. He was educated at Marlborough and King Edward's School, Birmingham.

== Initial military career ==
Entering the British Army through the militia, Kekewich joined the Buffs on 2 December 1874. He fought in the Perak War of 1875–6, and in the Sudan, 1884–5, where he gained a brevet majority. He was employed as Deputy Assistant Adjutant-General in the Sudan campaign of 1888, and afterwards as military secretary to the Commander-in-Chief, Madras, and was engaged in the Third Anglo-Burmese War.

== Boer War ==
Kekewich was promoted into the Loyal Regiment (North Lancashire) and commanded the 1st Battalion of that regiment in the Second Boer War. He commanded the garrison in Kimberley during the siege and successful defence of the town, during which time he came into conflict with Cecil Rhodes who was also present. Following the relief of the town on 15 February 1900, Rhodes persuaded John French, commanding the relief force, to replace Kekewich with another officer as commander of the garrison. Kekewich received a brevet promotion to colonel for his services a week later, on 21 February 1900. In late September 1901 he was wounded in an attack by General de la Rey near Moedwil, but soon recuperated. In April 1902 he was in charge during the British victory at the Battle of Rooiwal, the last major battle during the war. He stayed in South Africa until peace had been signed in June 1902, when he returned to England on the SS Carisbrook Castle, landing at Southampton in early August. In a despatch dated 23 June 1902, Lord Kitchener, Commander in Chief in South Africa during the latter part of the war, wrote how Kekewich had "maintained his high reputation as a fine soldier of character, loyalty and discretion" throughout the war, and concluded that he was "well qualified to hold high command."

For his services Kekewich was appointed a Companion of the Order of the Bath (CB) in the April 1901 South Africa Honours list (the award was dated to 29 November 1900; he only received the actual decoration from King Edward VII at Buckingham Palace on 24 October 1902), and on 22 August 1902 he was promoted major general for distinguished service in the Field. In early October 1902 he was placed on half-pay.

== Later service and retirement ==
Kekewich retired from the army in 1904 but was appointed to the honorary position of Colonel of the Buffs on 5 October 1909.

In 1912 he was Best Man at the wedding of Robert Baden-Powell, and later was Godfather to his son Peter Baden-Powell.

== Death ==
On the outbreak of World War I in 1914 Kekewich was appointed to the 13th (Western) Division, which he commanded until shortly before his death by suicide (gunshot to his head) at the age of 60 on 5 November 1914. In poor health and suffering from depression, Kekewich had been invalided from his command and hospitalized before returning to his home near Exeter. He was buried in St Martin's Churchyard, Exminster, Devon.

== Character ==
The historian Thomas Pakenham describes Kekewich as "a pleasant ... unassuming man" but also a serious, painstaking soldier with strong nerves and diplomatic skills. These traits were needed during the siege of Kimberley when Cecil Rhodes behaved in an emotional and irresponsible manner, undermining Kekewich's leadership and standing with his military superiors, and at one stage threatening to surrender the town.

Military offices
Preceded by New post	GOC 13th (Western) Division; August–October 1914	Succeeded by H. B. Jeffreys
