= Trehawke Kekewich =

English barrister and judge (1851–1932)

Sir Trehawke Kekewich Bt

Recorder of Tiverton
- In office 1899–1920

Personal details
- Born: Trehawke Herbert Kekewich; 11 July 1851 Peamore House, Exeter, Devon, England
- Died: 10 March 1932 (aged 80)

Sir Trehawke Herbert Kekewich, 1st Baronet (11 July 1851 – 10 March 1932) was an English barrister and judge.

Kekewich was born at Peamore House, near Exeter, Devon, into an old Devon family. He was the son of Trehawke Kekewich and grandson of the politician Samuel Trehawke Kekewich. His brother was Major-General Robert Kekewich, and his uncle was the noted judge Sir Arthur Kekewich.

He was educated at Marlborough College and Christ Church, Oxford, and was called to the Bar at the Inner Temple in 1877.

He served as Recorder of Tiverton from 1899 to 1920 and also as chairman of the Devon Quarter Sessions. He was created a baronet in the 1921 New Year Honours.

Kekewich and his wife, Edith, had no children who survived him (he outlived his son Robert Kekewich and his daughter Mildred) and so the baronetcy became extinct on his death.

== Footnotes ==
Baronetage of the United Kingdom
New creation	Baronet (of Peamore); 1921–1932	Extinct
