= John Carpenter Garnier =

English politician (1839–1926)

John Carpenter Garnier JP DL (born Carpenter, 28 February 1839 – 5 October 1926) was an English Conservative politician who sat in the House of Commons from 1873 to 1884.

== Biography ==
Carpenter Garnier was the son of John Carpenter of Mount Tavy, Tavistock, Devon, and his wife, Lucy Garnier, daughter of Rev. William Garnier and Lady Harriet North (daughter of 5th Earl of Guilford). He was educated at Harrow School and Christ Church, Oxford. In 1864, he assumed the name Garnier on inheriting the Rookesbury Park estates of his uncle near Fareham in Hampshire. He was a JP for Hampshire, and a JP and deputy lieutenant for Devon.

Carpentier Garnier stood for parliament unsuccessfully at South Hampshire in 1868. In 1873, he was elected member of parliament for South Devon. He held the seat until 1884.

In his younger years he was a first-class cricketer, playing one match each for the Marylebone Cricket Club and Oxford University.

He married Hon. Mary Louisa Trefusis, daughter of Charles Trefusis, 19th Baron Clinton. Their eldest son, John Trefusis Carpentier-Garnier, was killed in action in 1914 in the First World War. His third son was Bishop Mark Carpenter-Garnier.

Carpenter-Garnier died at the age of 87 at Fareham.

Parliament of the United Kingdom
Preceded by Samuel Trehawke Kekewich; Sir Massey Lopes, Bt	Member of Parliament for South Devon; 1873 – 1884; With: Sir Massey Lopes, Bt	Succeeded by John Tremayne; Sir Massey Lopes, Bt
