= Sir Robert Newman, 1st Baronet =

British Whig politician

Sir Robert William Newman, 1st Baronet (18 August 1776 – 24 January 1848) was a British Whig politician. He was elected as one of the two Members of Parliament (MPs) for Bletchingley at a by-election in December 1812.

He held that seat until the 1818 general election, when he was returned for Exeter, and held the seat until the 1826 general election, which he did not contest.

He was created a baronet of Stokeley and of Mamhead in the County of Devon in 1836. He lived at Mamhead House, which he had built in the 1820s, employing Anthony Salvin as architect. He died, aged 71, and was succeeded by Sir Robert Lydston Newman, 2nd Baronet, who was killed in action at the battle of Inkerman.

He was high sheriff of Devon in 1827.

== Sources ==
- Hughes, A. (1898). List of Sheriffs for England and Wales from the Earliest Times to A.D. 1831. London: Eyre & Spottiswoode. (with amendments of 1963, Public Record Office)

Parliament of the United Kingdom
Preceded by Sir Charles Talbot, Bt; William Kenrick	Member of Parliament for Bletchingley; 1812 – 1818; With: William Kenrick to 1814; John Bolland from 1814	Succeeded by Matthew Russell; George Tennyson
Preceded by James Buller; William Courtenay	Member of Parliament for Exeter; 1818 – 1826; With: William Courtenay to Feb 1826; Samuel Trehawke Kekewich from Feb 1826	Succeeded by Lewis William Buck; Samuel Trehawke Kekewich
Baronetage of the United Kingdom
New creation	Baronet (of Stokeley & Mamhead); 1836–1848	Succeeded by Robert Lydston Newman
