= James Godby =

James Godby (1767–1849) was a British stipple engraver. In the early 19th century, he was living at 25 Norfolk Street, near the Middlesex Hospital.

== Works ==
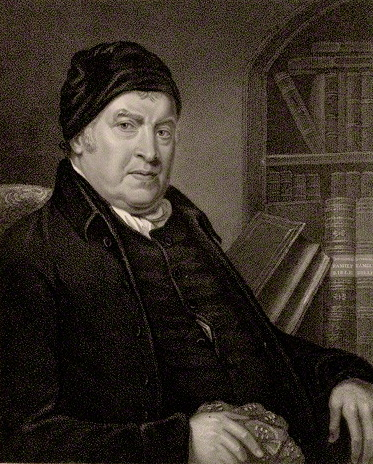
John Fawcett, 1814 engraving by James Godby

Godby's earliest known engraving is a portrait of Edward Snape, farrier to George III of Great Britain engraved in 1791, after a portrait by Whitby. He engraved two large plates after Henry Singleton, representing Adam bearing the Wounded Body of Abel and The Departure of Cain, published in 1799 and 1800 respectively. In 1810 he engraved a full-length portrait Edward Wyatt, Esq., after Sir Thomas Lawrence.

Later in life Godby engraved several plates after Friedrich Rehberg, including portraits of Madame de Stael and Sir John Herschel, and a fancy group entitled Bacchus's and Cupid's Vintage. He also engraved plates for the Literary Magazine and The Fine Arts of the English School.

== Notes ==
Attribution

This article incorporates text from a publication now in the public domain: Stephen, Leslie; Lee, Sidney, eds. (1890). "Godby, James". Dictionary of National Biography. Vol. 22. London: Smith, Elder & Co.
