= George Kekewich (Saltash MP) =

16th-century English politician

George Kekewich (1530–1582) was an English politician.

He was a member (MP) of the parliament of England for Saltash in March 1553.
