= George William Kekewich =

British Civil Servant and Liberal Party politician

Sir George William Kekewich MP

Sir George William Kekewich KCB (1 April 1841 – 5 July 1921) was a British Civil Servant and Liberal Party politician.

== Family and education ==
He was the son of Samuel Trehawke Kekewich by his second wife Louisa Buck, and the half-brother of the judge Sir Arthur Kekewich. He attended Eton and Balliol.

== Civil service career ==
He was an Examiner in the Education Department, 1867–71, and a Senior Examiner, 1871–90. He was Secretary to the Education Department from 1890 to 1900. During this time he gave his support to Julie Schwabe, Claude Montefiore, William Mather and others who were establishing Froebelian education. He was Secretary also of the Science and Art Department from 1899 to 1900. He was knighted (KCB) in 1895. He was appointed Secretary of the Board of Education in April 1900, serving to 1903.

== Political career ==
He was the Member of Parliament (MP) for Exeter from 1906 to January 1910.

Government offices
Preceded by Patrick Cumin	Secretary to the Committee of the Privy Council on Education; 1890–1899	Succeeded by himself as Secretary to the Board of Education
Preceded by himself as Secretary to the Committee of the Privy Council on Education	Secretary to the Board of Education; 1899–1902	Succeeded by Sir Robert Morant
Parliament of the United Kingdom
Preceded by Sir Edgar Vincent	Member of Parliament for Exeter; 1906–Jan 1910	Succeeded by Henry Duke
