= South Devon (constituency) =

UK Parliament constituency (1832–1885, 2024 onwards)

- County constituency for the House of Commons
- Interactive map of boundaries since 2024
- Boundary of South Devon in South West England
- County: Devon
- Electorate: 71,691 (2023)
- Major settlements: Totnes, Salcombe, Brixham, Dartmouth and Kingsbridge

Current constituency
- Created: 2024
- Member of Parliament: Caroline Voaden (Liberal Democrats)
- Seats: One
- Created from: Totnes

1832–1885
- Seats: Two
- Type of constituency: County constituency
- Created from: Devon
- Replaced by: Totnes; Tavistock

South Devon, formerly known as the Southern Division of Devon, is a parliamentary constituency in the county of Devon in England. From 1832 to 1885 it returned two Knights of the Shire to the House of Commons of the Parliament of the United Kingdom, elected by the bloc vote system.

Further to the completion of the 2023 Periodic Review of Westminster constituencies, the seat was re-established for the 2024 general election, where it effectively replaced the abolished Totnes constituency with minor boundary changes.

== Constituency profile ==
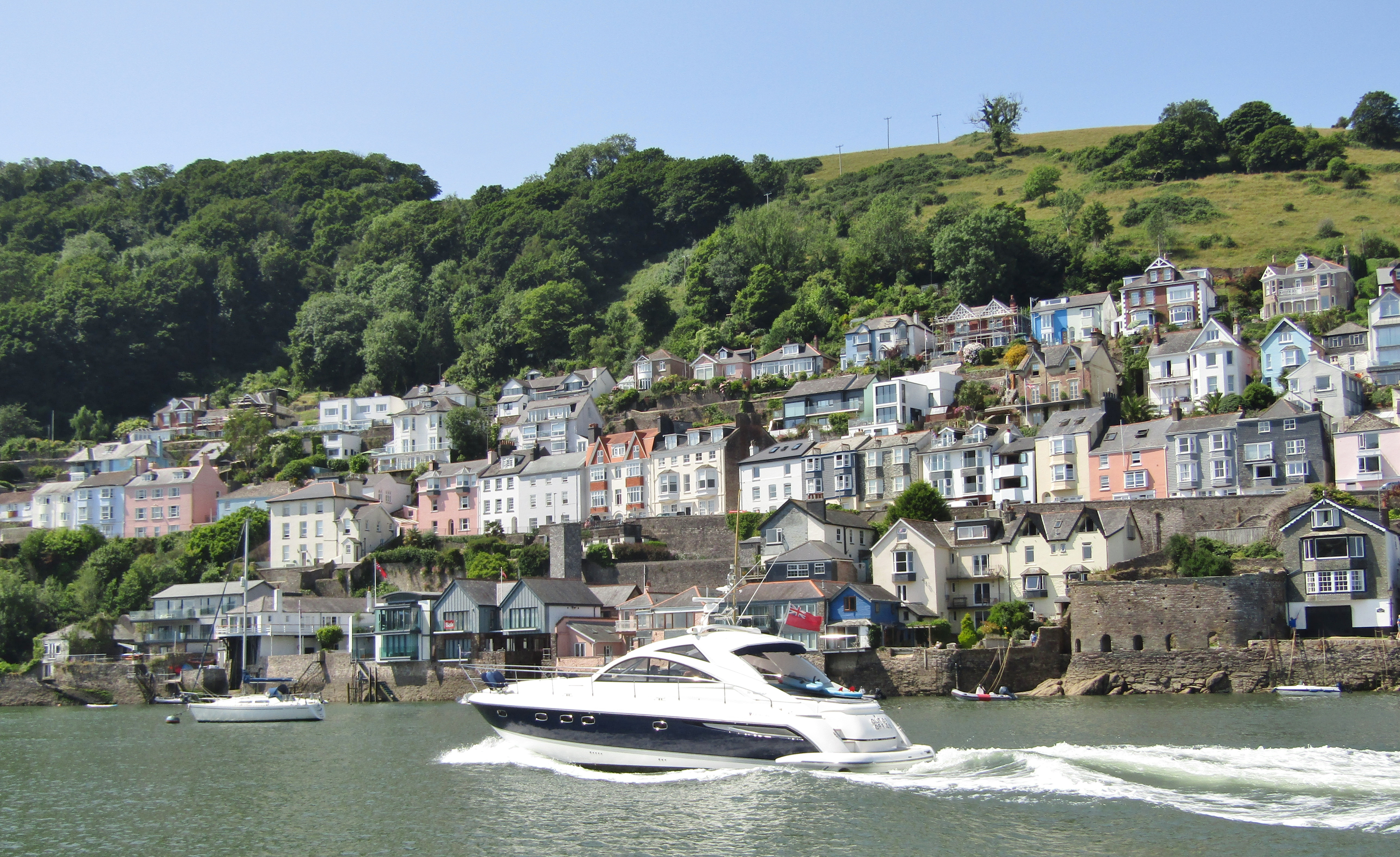
Dartmouth

South Devon is a constituency in Devon in South West England, taking up most of the South Hams district and part of the borough of Torbay. Its largest town is Brixham, which has a population of around 17,000. Other settlements include the towns of Totnes, Dartmouth, Kingsbridge, Salcombe and Modbury, the villages of Galmpton and South Brent and the Foxhole residential area of Paignton.

This is a mostly rural constituency stretching from the upland moors of Dartmoor and through the hills of South Devon National Landscape down to the south coast. Most of the towns here are coastal and have a maritime heritage; Brixham is traditionally an important fishing port, Dartmouth is the location of the Royal Navy's officer training academy, and Salcombe is popular with tourists for its sailing and yachting. The inland Totnes is a historic market town known for its alternative and New Age community. Most of the constituency has average levels of wealth, although there is some deprivation in Brixham and Foxhole. The area's popularity as a location for holiday homes has pushed up house prices, which are generally higher than the regional and UK averages.

South Devon has a very large retired population and low proportions of young and middle-aged adults. Residents have below-average levels of income but above-average rates of homeownership. The child poverty rate is in line with the overall UK figure. They have average levels of education and a high proportion work in the tourism, retail and agriculture sectors. The percentage of residents claiming unemployment benefits is low. White people made up 97% of the population at the 2021 census.

At the local council level, most of this constituency is represented by Liberal Democrats, although Brixham elected Conservatives and Totnes elected Green Party councillors. An estimated 52% of voters in South Devon supported leaving the European Union in the 2016 referendum, identical to the UK-wide figure.

== Boundaries ==
=== Historic ===
Context of 1832–1868. Extract from 1837 result: the largest blue area.

In 1832 the county of Devon, in south western England, was divided for Parliamentary purposes between this constituency and North Devon. In 1868 the Devon county constituencies were re-arranged into North, South and East Devon divisions. Each of these divisions returned two members of Parliament.

In 1885 the three constituencies were again redrawn, so that Devon was represented by eight single member County constituencies (there were also three borough constituencies, two of which returned two members and the third one member). The county was split between the new smaller constituencies of Ashburton (alternatively the Mid Division), Barnstaple (the North-Western Division), Honiton (the Eastern Division), South Molton (the Northern Division), Tavistock (the Western Division), Tiverton (the North-Eastern Division), Torquay and Totnes (the Southern Division). The constituencies in this redistribution are normally referred to by the distinctive place name rather than the alternative compass point designation, so the South Devon division is considered to have been abolished in 1885.

1832–1868: The Hundreds of Axminster, Clyston, Colyton, Ottery St. Mary, East Budleigh, Lifton, Exminster, Teignbridge, Haytor, Coleridge, Stanborough, Ermington, Plympton, Roborough, and Tavistock, and Exeter Castle, and the parts of the hundred of Wonford that are not included in the city of Exeter.

1868–1885: The Hundreds of Black Torrington, Ermington, Lifton, Plympton, Roborough, Stanborough and Coleridge, and Tavistock.

=== Current ===
The re-established constituency is composed of the following (as they existed on 1 December 2020):

- The District of South Hams wards of: Allington & Strete; Blackawton & Stoke Fleming; Charterlands; Dartington & Staverton; Dartmouth & East Dart; Kingsbridge; Loddiswell & Aveton Gifford; Marldon & Littlehempston; Salcombe & Thurlestone; South Brent; Stokenham; Totnes; West Dart.
- The Borough of Torbay wards of: Churston with Galmpton; Collaton St. Mary; Furzeham with Summercombe; King’s Ash; St. Peter’s with St. Mary’s.

It is formed from the former seat of Totnes, with only minor changes to its boundaries.

== Members of Parliament ==
=== 1832–1885 ===
| Election | First member | First party | Second member | Second party |
|---|---|---|---|---|
| 1832 | Lord John Russell | Whig | John Crocker Bulteel | Whig |
| 1835 | Lord John Russell | Whig | Sir John Yarde-Buller, Bt | Conservative |
| May 1835 by-election | Montague Parker | Conservative | Sir John Yarde-Buller, Bt | Conservative |
| 1841 | Lord Courtenay | Conservative | Sir John Yarde-Buller, Bt | Conservative |
| 1849 by-election | Sir Ralph Lopes, Bt | Conservative | Sir John Yarde-Buller, Bt | Conservative |
| 1854 by-election | Sir Lawrence Palk, Bt | Conservative | Sir John Yarde-Buller, Bt | Conservative |
| 1858 by-election | Sir Lawrence Palk, Bt | Conservative | Samuel Trehawke Kekewich | Conservative |
| 1868 | Sir Massey Lopes, Bt | Conservative | Samuel Trehawke Kekewich | Conservative |
| 1873 by-election | Sir Massey Lopes, Bt | Conservative | John Carpenter Garnier | Conservative |
| 1884 by-election | Sir Massey Lopes, Bt | Conservative | John Tremayne | Conservative |
| 1885 | Constituency abolished | | | |

=== Since 2024 ===
| Election | Member | Party |
|---|---|---|
| 2024 | Caroline Voaden | Liberal Democrats |

== Elections ==
=== Elections in the 2020s ===
General election 2024: South Devon
| Party | Candidate | Votes | % | ±% |
|---|---|---|---|---|
| Liberal Democrats | Caroline Voaden | 22,540 | 46.0 | +17.8 |
| Conservative | Anthony Mangnall | 15,413 | 31.5 | −22.1 |
| Reform | Michael Bagley | 6,363 | 13.0 | N/A |
| Labour | Daniel Steel | 3,066 | 6.3 | −10.7 |
| Green | Robert Bagnall | 1,497 | 3.1 | +2.9 |
| Heritage | Becca Collings | 125 | 0.3 | N/A |
| Majority | | 7,127 | 14.5 | N/A |
| Turnout | | 49,004 | 69.3 | −6.3 |
| Registered electors | | 70,755 | | |
| Liberal Democrats gain from Conservative | | Swing | +20.0 | |

2019 notional result
| Party | Vote | % |
|---|---|---|
| Conservative | 29,027 | 53.6 |
| Liberal Democrats | 15,308 | 28.2 |
| Labour | 9,228 | 17.0 |
| Independent | 544 | 1.0 |
| Green | 82 | 0.2 |
| Turnout | 54,189 | 75.6 |
| Electorate | 71,691 | |

=== Elections in the 1880s ===
By-election, 14 Aug 1884: South Devon
| Party | Candidate | Votes | % | ±% |
|---|---|---|---|---|
| Conservative | John Tremayne | Unopposed | | |
| Conservative hold | | | | |

General election 1880: South Devon
| Party | Candidate | Votes | % | ±% |
|---|---|---|---|---|
| Conservative | John Carpenter Garnier | Unopposed | | |
| Conservative | Massey Lopes | Unopposed | | |
| Registered electors | | 7,982 | | |
| Conservative hold | | | | |
| Conservative hold | | | | |

Garnier resigned, triggering a by-election.

=== Elections in the 1870s ===
By-election, 19 Mar 1874: South Devon
| Party | Candidate | Votes | % | ±% |
|---|---|---|---|---|
| Conservative | Massey Lopes | Unopposed | | |
| Conservative hold | | | | |

General election 1874: South Devon
| Party | Candidate | Votes | % | ±% |
|---|---|---|---|---|
| Conservative | John Carpenter Garnier | Unopposed | | |
| Conservative | Massey Lopes | Unopposed | | |
| Registered electors | | 8,350 | | |
| Conservative hold | | | | |
| Conservative hold | | | | |

Lopes was appointed a Civil Lord of the Admiralty, triggering a by-election.

By-election, 17 Jun 1873: South Devon
| Party | Candidate | Votes | % | ±% |
|---|---|---|---|---|
| Conservative | John Carpenter Garnier | Unopposed | | |
| Conservative hold | | | | |

=== Elections in the 1860s ===
General election 1868: South Devon
| Party | Candidate | Votes | % | ±% |
|---|---|---|---|---|
| Conservative | Massey Lopes | 3,234 | 35.3 | N/A |
| Conservative | Samuel Trehawke Kekewich | 3,233 | 35.3 | N/A |
| Liberal | John Russell | 2,694 | 29.4 | New |
| Majority | | 539 | 5.9 | N/A |
| Turnout | | 5,928 (est) | 73.7 (est) | N/A |
| Registered electors | | 8,047 | | |
| Conservative hold | | | | |
| Conservative hold | | | | |

Kekewich's death triggered a by-election.

General election 1865: South Devon
| Party | Candidate | Votes | % | ±% |
|---|---|---|---|---|
| Conservative | Samuel Trehawke Kekewich | Unopposed | | |
| Conservative | Lawrence Palk | Unopposed | | |
| Registered electors | | 9,592 | | |
| Conservative hold | | | | |
| Conservative hold | | | | |

=== Elections in the 1850s ===
General election 1859: South Devon
| Party | Candidate | Votes | % | ±% |
|---|---|---|---|---|
| Conservative | Samuel Trehawke Kekewich | Unopposed | | |
| Conservative | Lawrence Palk | Unopposed | | |
| Registered electors | | 9,466 | | |
| Conservative hold | | | | |
| Conservative hold | | | | |

By-election, 6 August 1858: South Devon
| Party | Candidate | Votes | % | ±% |
|---|---|---|---|---|
| Conservative | Samuel Trehawke Kekewich | Unopposed | | |
| Conservative hold | | | | |

General election 1857: South Devon
| Party | Candidate | Votes | % | ±% |
|---|---|---|---|---|
| Conservative | John Yarde-Buller | Unopposed | | |
| Conservative | Lawrence Palk | Unopposed | | |
| Registered electors | | 9,625 | | |
| Conservative hold | | | | |
| Conservative hold | | | | |

Buller was elevated to the peerage, becoming 1st Baron Churston, triggering a by-election.

By-election, 14 February 1854: South Devon
| Party | Candidate | Votes | % | ±% |
|---|---|---|---|---|
| Conservative | Lawrence Palk | Unopposed | | |
| Conservative hold | | | | |

General election 1852: South Devon
| Party | Candidate | Votes | % | ±% |
|---|---|---|---|---|
| Conservative | John Yarde-Buller | Unopposed | | |
| Conservative | Ralph Lopes | Unopposed | | |
| Registered electors | | 9,569 | | |
| Conservative hold | | | | |
| Conservative hold | | | | |

Lopes' death triggered a by-election.

=== Elections in the 1840s ===
By-election, 13 February 1849: South Devon
| Party | Candidate | Votes | % | ±% |
|---|---|---|---|---|
| Conservative | Ralph Lopes | Unopposed | | |
| Conservative hold | | | | |

General election 1847: South Devon
| Party | Candidate | Votes | % | ±% |
|---|---|---|---|---|
| Conservative | John Yarde-Buller | Unopposed | | |
| Conservative | William Courtenay | Unopposed | | |
| Registered electors | | 10,411 | | |
| Conservative hold | | | | |
| Conservative hold | | | | |

Courtenay resigned by accepting the office of Steward of the Chiltern Hundreds, triggering a by-election.

General election 1841: South Devon
| Party | Candidate | Votes | % | ±% |
|---|---|---|---|---|
| Conservative | John Yarde-Buller | Unopposed | | |
| Conservative | William Courtenay | Unopposed | | |
| Registered electors | | 10,783 | | |
| Conservative hold | | | | |
| Conservative hold | | | | |

=== Elections in the 1830s ===
General election 1837: South Devon
| Party | Candidate | Votes | % |
|---|---|---|---|
| Conservative | John Yarde-Buller | 4,974 | 37.1 |
| Conservative | Montague Parker | 4,671 | 34.9 |
| Whig | John Crocker Bulteel | 3,744 | 28.0 |
| Majority | | 927 | 6.9 |
| Turnout | | 8,449 | 78.4 |
| Registered electors | | 10,775 | |
| Conservative hold | | | |
| Conservative gain from Whig | | | |

By-election, 7 May 1835: South Devon
| Party | Candidate | Votes | % |
|---|---|---|---|
| Conservative | Montague Parker | 3,755 | 54.6 |
| Whig | John Russell | 3,128 | 45.4 |
| Majority | | 627 | 9.2 |
| Turnout | | 6,883 | 84.4 |
| Registered electors | | 8,160 | |
| Conservative gain from Whig | | | |

General election 1835: South Devon
| Party | Candidate | Votes | % |
|---|---|---|---|
| Whig | John Russell | Unopposed | |
| Conservative | John Yarde-Buller | Unopposed | |
| Registered electors | | 8,160 | |
| Whig hold | | | |
| Conservative gain from Whig | | | |

Russell was appointed Home Secretary, triggering a by-election.

General election 1832: South Devon
| Party | Candidate | Votes | % |
|---|---|---|---|
| Whig | John Russell | 3,782 | 35.4 |
| Whig | John Crocker Bulteel | 3,684 | 34.5 |
| Tory | John Yarde-Buller | 3,217 | 30.1 |
| Majority | | 467 | 4.4 |
| Turnout | | 6,660 | 89.4 |
| Registered electors | | 7,453 | |
| Whig win (new seat) | | | |
| Whig win (new seat) | | | |

== See also ==
- List of former United Kingdom Parliament constituencies
