= Samuel Trehawke Kekewich =

English Tory and later Conservative Party politician

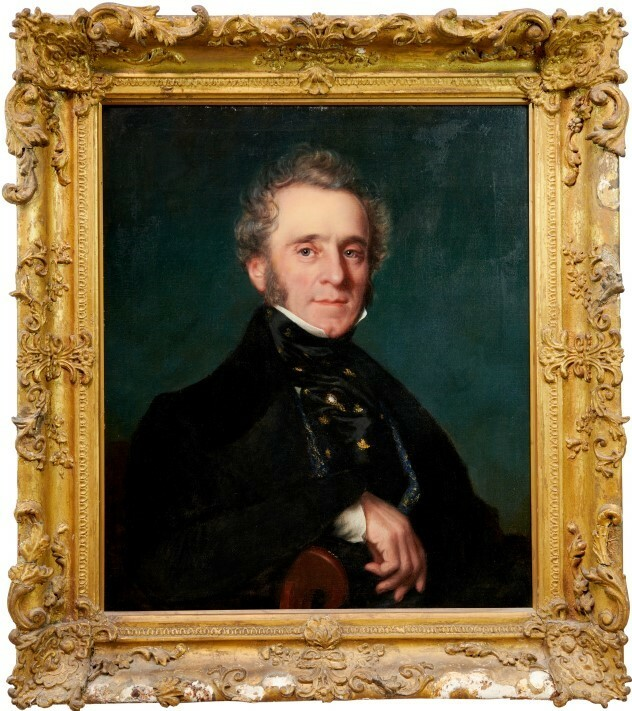

Member of the British Parliament for Exeter
- In office 1826–1830

Member of the British Parliament for South Devon
- In office 1858–1873

Personal details
- Born: 31 October 1796
- Died: 1 June 1873 (aged 76)
- Spouses: Agatha Maria Sophia Langston; Louisa Buck
- Education: Christ Church, Oxford
- Occupation: politician

Samuel Trehawke Kekewich (31 October 1796 – 1 June 1873) was an English Tory and later Conservative Party politician who sat in the House of Commons from 1826 to 1830 and from 1858 to 1873.

Kekewich was the son of Samuel Kekewich of Peamore Exeter and his wife Salome Sweet, daughter of George Sweet of Tiverton. He was educated at Eton College and Christ Church, Oxford. He was a deputy lieutenant and J.P. for Devon.

In 1826, Kekewich was elected unopposed at a by-election as a member of parliament (MP) for Exeter, and held the seat until 1830. In 1835 he was High Sheriff of Devon. He stood for parliament unsuccessfully at Liskeard in the 1835 and 1837 general elections. In August 1858, he was elected at an unopposed by-election as an MP for South Devon. He held the seat until his death in 1873. He was chairman of the visitors of the lunatic asylum and chairman of the board of guardians at St Thomas's Exeter for 21 years. Kekewich died at the age of 76.

== Family ==
In 1820, he married Agatha Maria Sophia Langston, daughter of John Langston of Sarsden Oxfordshire. His second son was the noted judge Sir Arthur Kekewich; his eldest son Trehawke Kekewich was the father of his grandsons, Sir Trehawke Herbert Kekewich, 1st Baronet and Major General Robert Kekewich.

In 1840, he married secondly, to Louisa Buck, daughter of Lewis William Buck (1784-1858) of Moreton House, Bideford, and Hartland Abbey, Devon, Member of Parliament for Exeter 1826-32 and for North Devon 1839–57. By this marriage, he was the father of George William Kekewich.

Parliament of the United Kingdom
Preceded by William Courtenay; Sir Robert Newman, Bt	Member of Parliament for Exeter; 1826–1830; With: Sir Robert Newman, Bt to June 1826; Lewis William Buck from June 1826	Succeeded by James Wentworth Buller; Lewis William Buck
Preceded by Sir John Yarde-Buller, Bt; Sir Lawrence Palk, Bt	Member of Parliament for South Devon; 1858 – 1873; With: Sir Lawrence Palk, Bt to 1868; Sir Massey Lopes, Bt from 1868	Succeeded by John Carpenter Garnier; Sir Massey Lopes, Bt
