= Maristow House =

Country house in Devon, England

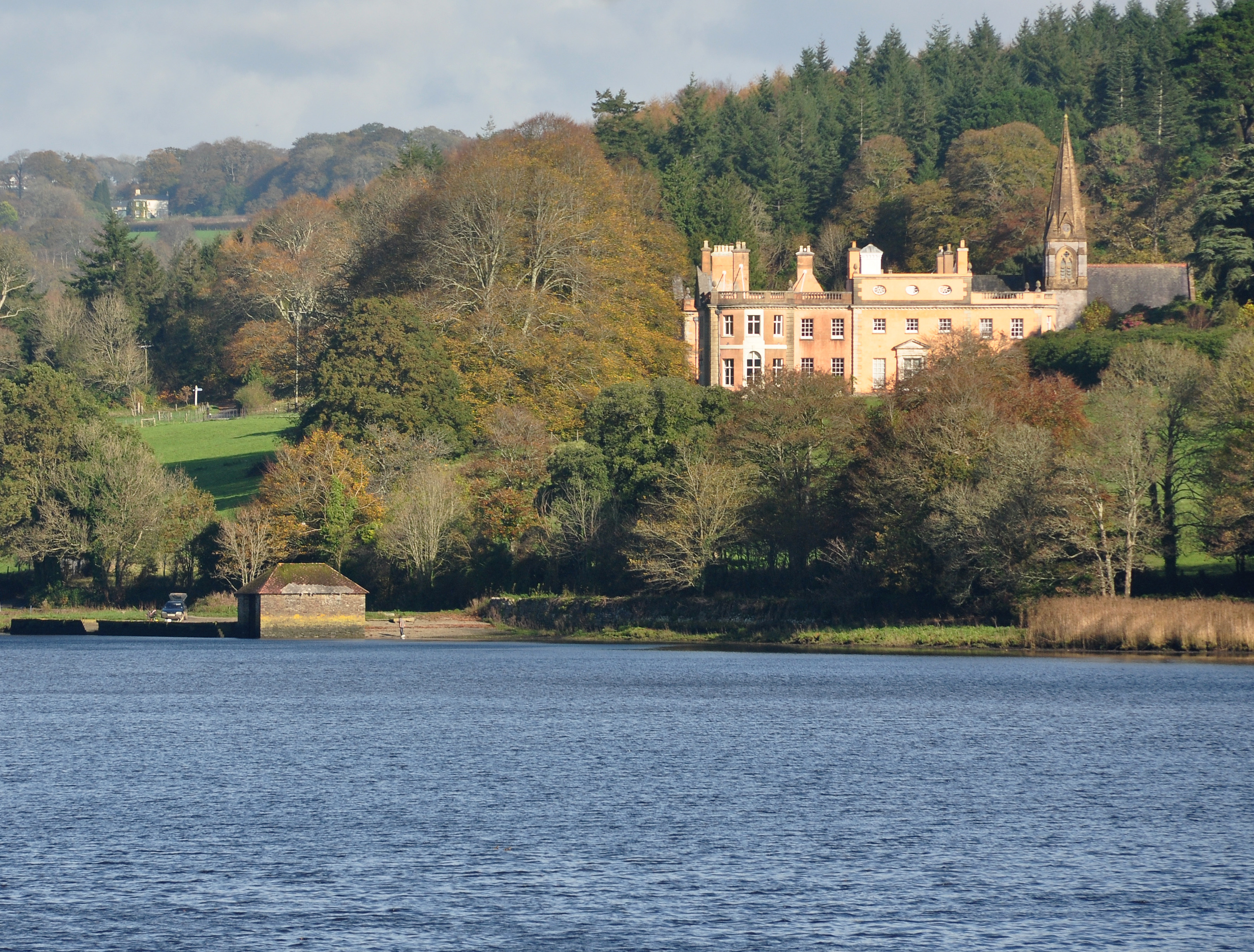
- Maristow House, viewed from across the River Tavy
- Interactive map of the Maristow House area

General information
- Architectural style: Georgian (rebuild)
- Location: Bickleigh, South Hams, Devon, England
- Coordinates: 50.4613°N 4.1509°W
- Years built: c. 1560 (original); Mid-18th century (rebuild)
- Renovated: Early 20th century 1990s

Technical details
- Floor count: 2 + attic

Design and construction
- Designations: Grade II* listed

Renovating team
- Other designers: Kit Martin

Maristow House in the parish of Bickleigh (formerly Tamerton Foliot), Devon, England, is a large country house set in landscaped parkland, on the River Tavy to the north of Plymouth. It was built in about 1560, rebuilt in the mid-18th century and further remodelled in the early 20th century. Between 1798 and 1938 it was the residence of the Lopes family, Barons Roborough. The house was ruined by fire after World War II, but was restored and converted into apartments in the late 1990s by Kit Martin. It is a grade II* listed building, having been so designated on 29 March 1960.

== History ==
The Heywood family built an imposing Georgian mansion here in the 1760s. In 1798, after the death of James Modyford Heywood, the house and estate were bought by the Jamaican-born Manasseh Masseh Lopes, the son of a rich plantation owner, whose family later gained the title of Baron Roborough. The house was extended and altered in 1907. The Lopes remained seated at Maristow until 1938, after which the house served a variety of purposes: a servicemen's hospital during World War II; a retirement home for clergy; a residential school, and a field-study centre. Above the house rises the spire of St Martin's chapel, built in 1871 as a successor to an earlier 14th century chapel. Following two disastrous fires, the house has now been restored and converted into twelve private homes.

== The house ==
The house has an E-shaped plan and consists of two storeys and an attic. It is built of rubble stone which has been rendered, and the dressings are stone. The mansard roof is slated and has a modillion cornice and a balustraded parapet. The wings project forwards from the west front, the three-storey porch being in the centre of the facade. It has large Ionic pilasters and a segmental pediment. The arms of Lopes and an iron balcony top the round-arched doorway. The west front has bays arranged in a 2:3:1:3:2 format, whereas the south front has a 2:3:2 arrangement.

The interior was partly gutted by fire in the 20th century, but the 18th century staircase survived as did some of the plasterwork and some 18th century moulded door architraves. The ground floor room in the north-eastern corner of the house has 18th century moulded panelling, a moulded plaster ceiling, overdoors with segmental open pediments, a fireplace with eared architraves, and an overmantel carved with wooden festoons.
