= McGowan family =

Family

McGowan
- Noble family
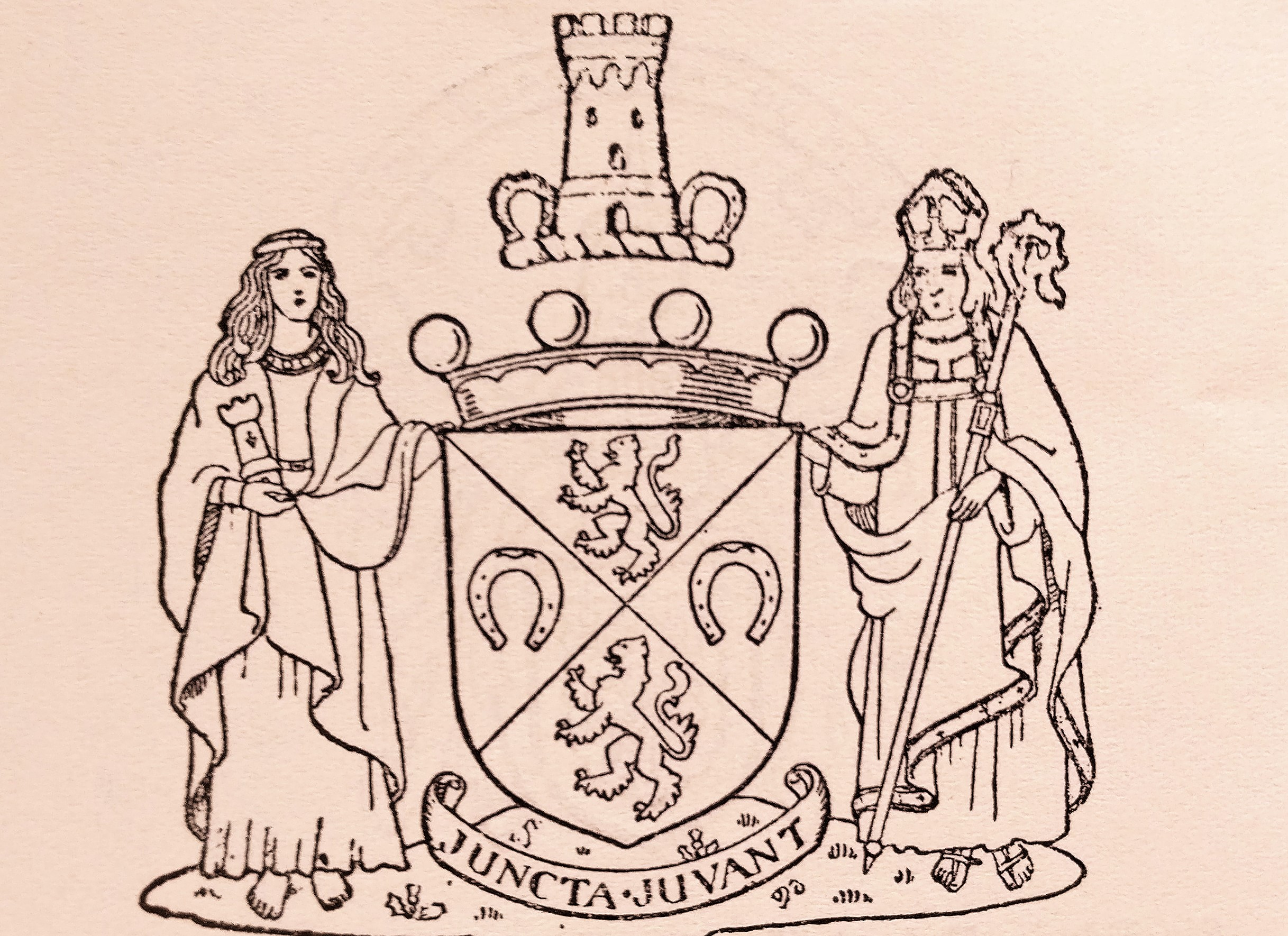
- Country: United Kingdom
- Founder: Sir Harry McGowan
- Current head: Lord Harry John Charles McGowan
- Titles: Baron McGowan of Ardeer
- Styles: His Lordship; Baron
- Estates: Highway House, West Froyle; Bragborough Hall, Northamptonshire

The McGowan family is a noble family holding titles in the Peerage of the United Kingdom and the Peerage and Baronetage of Ireland.

== Ancestry ==
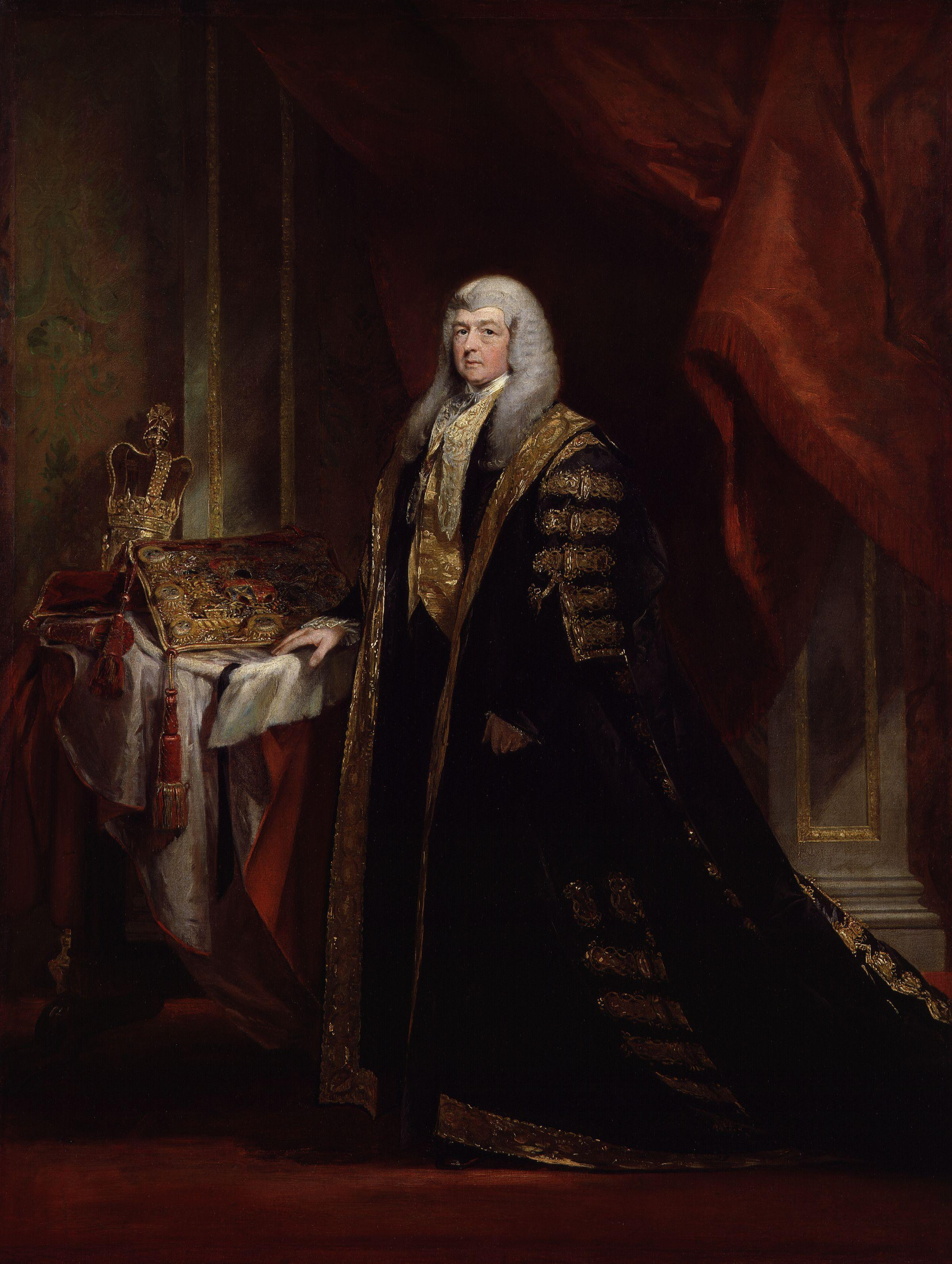
Charles Pepys, 1st Earl of Cottenham by Charles Robert Leslie

Through the current Lord McGowan's maternal grandfather, the family is descended from the Pepys family (the Earls of Cottenham), and the Nevill family, holders of the titles of Marquess of Abergavenny, Viscount Neville and Earl of Abergavenny. This connection names Kings Edward III, Edward IV and Richard III, the last members of the House of York to rule England, among the family's ancestors. This royal ancestry is derived from Cecily Neville, Duchess of York, mother to Edward IV and Richard III. The linked houses of Neville and York were to become renowned for their involvement in the War of the Roses.

King Edward III of England was the paternal Great-Grandfather of Cecily Neville.

Also among the family's ancestors is William Young, the highly regarded architect and Sir James Herbert Cory, Conservative MP and philanthropist.

=== Baron McGowan ===
The family's main title is that of Baron McGowan, of Ardeer, with this peerage being held only by the direct descendants of Sir Harry McGowan, 1st Bt, (later Lord McGowan). The current head of the family is Lord Harry John Charles McGowan, 4th Baron McGowan.

== Coat of arms ==
Coat of arms of McGowan family
Coronet A coronet of a Baron Crest A Tower Or between two Horseshoes proper Escutcheon Quarterly: Per saltire Argent and Azure two Lions rampant in pale Gules and as many Horseshoes in fess proper Supporters Dexter: a Figure representing St Barbara proper holding in the exterior hand a Tower Or; Sinister: a Figure representing St Kentigern proper holding in the exterior hand his Crozier Or Motto Juncta Juvant (Union is strength)

== Family tree ==
Ancestors of McGowan family

16. Henry McGowan
8. Sir Harry Duncan McGowan, 1st Baron McGowan, KBE
17. Agnes Wilson
4. Harry Wilson McGowan, 2nd Baron McGowan
18. William Young
9. Jean Boyle Young
19.
2. Harry Duncan Cory McGowan, 3rd Baron McGowan
20. John Cory
10. Sir James Herbert Cory
21. Lady Louisa Augusta Venables-Vernon-Harcourt
5. Bessie Carmen Cory
22. Alexander Walker
11. Elizabeth Cansh Walker CBE
23. Elizabeth Easton
1. Harry John Charles McGowan; Hon. Louisa McGowan Hon. Anabel McGowan
24. William John Pepys, 3rd Earl of Cottenham
12. Kenelm Charles Edward Pepys, 4th Earl of Cottenham
25. Theodosia Selina Dallas
6. John Digby Thomas Pepys, 7th Earl of Cottenham
26. William Nevill, 1st Marquess of Abergavenny
13. Lady Rose Leigh
27. Caroline Vanden-Bempde Johnstone
3. Lady Gillian Angela Pepys
28. Lord George Montacute Nevill
14. Guy Temple Montacute Nevill, 4th Marquess of Abergavenny
29. Florence Mary Soanes
7. Lady Angela Isabel Nevill
30. James Walker Larnach
15. Isabel Nellie Larnach
31. Lady Isabel Lettice Theodosia Boyle
