= Charles Courtenay =

Charles Courtenay may refer to:

- Charles Courtenay, 17th Earl of Devon (1916–1998)
- Charles Courtenay, 19th Earl of Devon (born 1975), barrister
- Charles Leslie Courtenay (died 1894), Canon of Windsor
