= Katherine LaNasa =

American actress (born 1966)

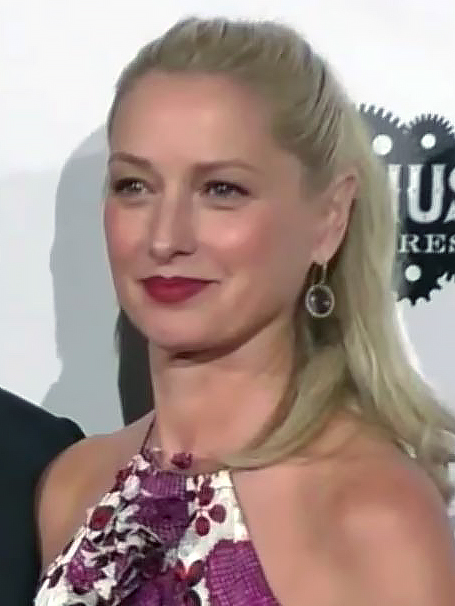
- LaNasa in 2016
- Born: December 1, 1966 (age 59); New Orleans, Louisiana, U.S.
- Occupations: Actress, dancer, choreographer
- Years active: 1989–present
- Known for: The Pitt; Three Sisters
- Spouses: Dennis Hopper (m. 1989; div. 1992) French Stewart (m. 1998; div. 2009) Grant Show (m. 2012)
- Children: 2

Katherine LaNasa (born December 1, 1966) is an American actress. Since 2025, she has portrayed Nurse Dana Evans in the HBO Max medical drama The Pitt (2025–present), for which she earned a Primetime Emmy Award, a Critics' Choice Award, and an Actor Award.

LaNasa starred in films Jayne Mansfield's Car, The Campaign, and The Frozen Ground. On television, LaNasa has had leading roles in the sitcom Three Sisters (2001–2002), the legal drama Truth Be Told (2019–2023), and the musical series Katy Keene (2020). She appeared in recurring roles on Judging Amy, Two and a Half Men, Big Love, and Longmire, and starred in the short-lived dramas Love Monkey (2006), Deception (2013), Satisfaction (2014–2015) and Imposters (2017–2018).

== Early life ==
Born in New Orleans, Louisiana, and raised in Baton Rouge, LaNasa is the daughter of surgeon Dr. James J. LaNasa Jr. She began dancing at the age of 12, and at the age of 14, she was admitted to the North Carolina School of the Arts in Winston-Salem, North Carolina. After an apprenticeship with Milwaukee Ballet, LaNasa danced with Salt Lake City's Ballet West and the Karole Armitage Ballet.

== Career ==
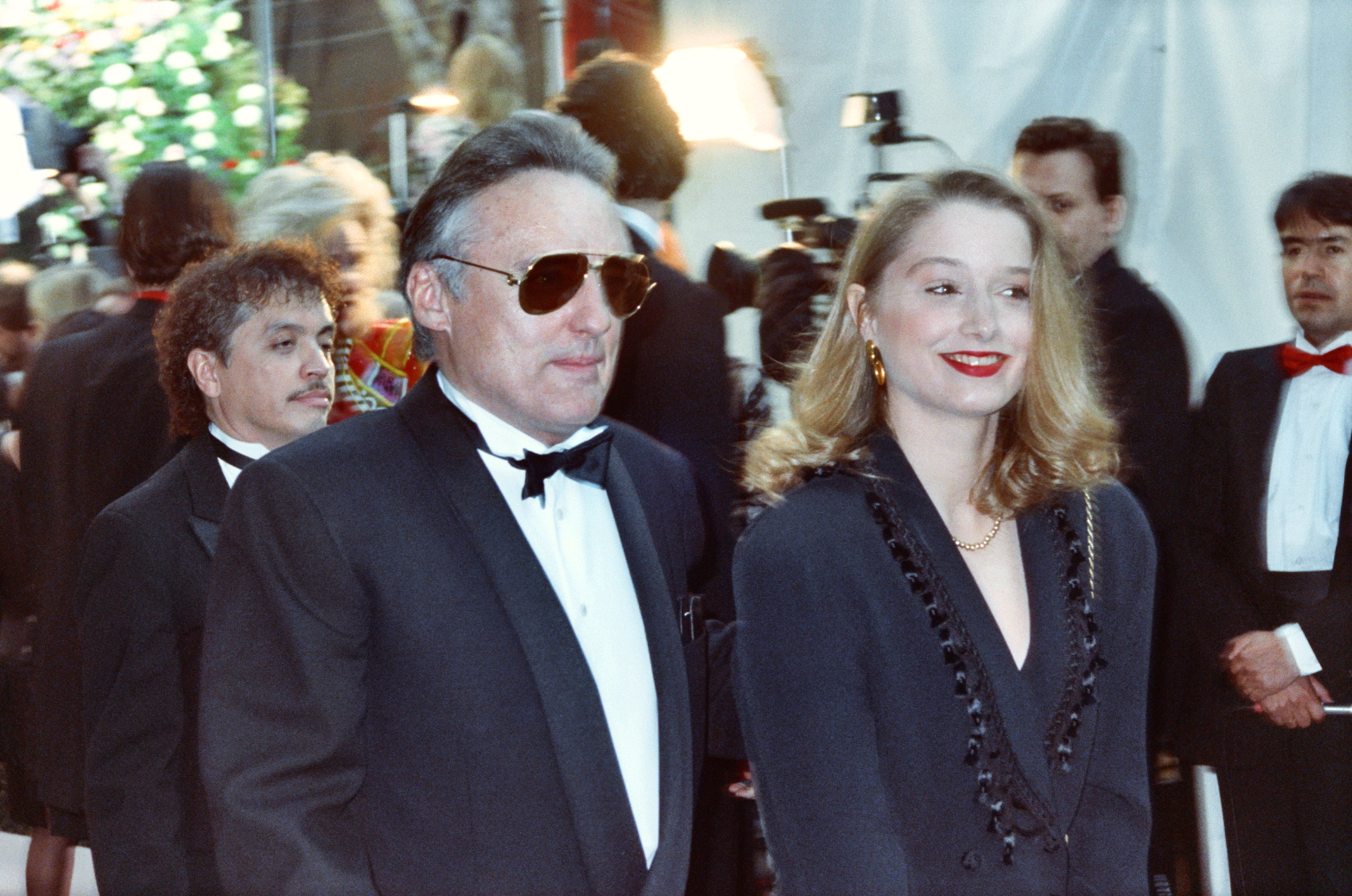
LaNasa with Dennis Hopper at the 1990 Academy Awards

LaNasa assisted John Carrafa with the choreography for the 1989 film Rooftops. She made her feature film debut with a small role in the 1990 film Catchfire and in following years appeared in supporting roles in film and television.

LaNasa guest starred on a number of television series, including Seinfeld, 3rd Rock from the Sun, Touched by an Angel, and The Practice, and in 2001 landed the lead role of Bess Bernstein-Flynn Keats in the NBC comedy series Three Sisters (2001–2002) opposite Dyan Cannon, A. J. Langer, and Vicki Lewis. The series was canceled after two seasons in 2002. She later had recurring roles in Judging Amy as Yvonne Dunbar, as Kim McPherson on The Guardian, and as Michelle Colohan on NYPD Blue. Her other television credits include guest roles on CSI: Crime Scene Investigation, Grey's Anatomy, ER, House M.D., Justice, and Two and a Half Men. LaNasa had series regular roles in short-lived CBS comedy-drama Love Monkey (2006), playing Karen Freed, and on HBO comedy 12 Miles of Bad Road, as Juliet Shakespeare. LaNasa appeared as Beverly Ford on Big Love from 2009 to 2011. LaNasa appeared in a number of motion pictures during her career. In 2011, after a decade of making various television appearances, she had roles opposite Will Ferrell and Zach Galifianakis in the 2012 political comedy The Campaign, and 2013 thriller The Frozen Ground. Before this, she had a role in Billy Bob Thornton's drama film Jayne Mansfield's Car, originally created for Robin Wright. Her other film credits include Kiss & Tell (1996), Schizopolis (1996), Alfie (2004), and Valentine's Day (2010).

In 2012, LaNasa was cast as socialite Sophia Bowers in another NBC series Deception, which premiered as a mid-season replacement during the 2012–13 television season. The soap-type series was canceled after a single season, ending it on a cliffhanger, in May 2013. She appeared in a recurring role as Lizzie Ambrose on A&E series Longmire from 2012 to 2013. In November 2013, LaNasa was cast as Adrianna, a madam who has a male escort service, in the USA Network drama Satisfaction opposite Matt Passmore. The series premiered on July 17, 2014, and was canceled after two seasons in 2015. In October 2014, she was cast alongside Ana Ortiz, Jeremy Sisto and Tyler Blackburn in the gay-drama Love Is All You Need?, based on the 2011 short film with the same name.

In 2016, LaNasa had a recurring role in the Lifetime comedy-drama Devious Maids. From 2017 to 2018, she was series regular on the Bravo comedy series, Imposters. In 2018, LaNasa joined the cast of the CW prime time soap opera Dynasty playing villainous criminal mastermind Ada Stone during the second season. In 2019, she appeared in the Apple TV drama series Truth Be Told opposite Octavia Spencer. She was cast as a series regular on the 2020 CW series Katy Keene.

In 2025, LaNasa was cast as Nurse Dana Evans in The Pitt. The role earned her an Emmy Award for Outstanding Supporting Actress in a Drama Series.

== Personal life ==
LaNasa, at the age of 22, married 53-year-old actor Dennis Hopper in June 1989; the couple divorced in April 1992. Hopper and LaNasa had a son, Henry Lee Hopper.

On May 19, 1998, she married actor French Stewart. They met when she made a guest appearance on a 1996 episode of 3rd Rock from the Sun. The two divorced in December 2009.

LaNasa married Grant Show, whom she had previously met on the set of Big Love, on August 18, 2012. She gave birth to their daughter on March 21, 2014. LaNasa has discussed in interviews what it is like to be a parent again at 47, saying she has a patience for parenthood now that she didn't have when she had her first child at 22.

In February 2023 she was diagnosed with breast cancer; she underwent surgery and radiation treatment at Piedmont Atlanta Hospital. Due to complications, she was in and out of the emergency room for six months after finishing treatment which she used to inform her performance on The Pitt. LaNasa has spoken about how she was able to "understand how scary it is to be on the other side" and how important small kindnesses from medical staff can be.

== Filmography ==
=== Film ===
| Year | Title | Role | Notes |
|---|---|---|---|
| 1990 | Catchfire | Waitress | |
| 1992 | Brain Donors | Dancer No. 1 | |
| 1994 | Flashfire | Monica Ambrose | |
| 1994 | Mortal Fear | Carol Donner | |
| 1994 | Honey, I Shrunk the Audience | Reporter | Short film |
| 1996 | Always Say Goodbye | Blonde Woman | |
| 1996 | The Destiny of Marty Fine | Amy | |
| 1996 | The Disappearance of Kevin Johnson | Cathy | |
| 1996 | Kiss & Tell | Georgia Montauk | |
| 1996 | Schizopolis | Diane | |
| 1997 | Take a Number | Victoria | |
| 2004 | Alfie | Uta | |
| 2008 | The Lucky Ones | Janet | |
| 2010 | Valentine's Day | Pamela Copeland | |
| 2012 | Jayne Mansfield's Car | Donna | |
| 2012 | The Campaign | Rose Brady | |
| 2013 | Buttwhistle | Mrs. Confer | |
| 2013 | The Frozen Ground | Fran Hansen | |
| 2015 | The Squeeze | Jessie | |
| 2016 | Love Is All You Need? | Vicki Curtis | Also executive producer |

=== Television ===
| Year | Title | Role | Notes |
|---|---|---|---|
| 1992 | The Heart of Justice | Hannah | Television film |
| 1994 | Under Suspicion | | Episode: "Arson/Murder Story" |
| 1994 | Jack Reed: A Search for Justice | Tiffany | Television film |
| 1995 | Seinfeld | Sgt. Cathy Tierny | Episode: "The Beard" |
| 1995 | Nothing But the Truth | Susie Marsh | Television film |
| 1995 | The Marshal | Penny | Episode: "Buy Hard" |
| 1996 | The Crew | Ariel | Episode: "My Mother, My Sister" |
| 1996 | 3rd Rock from the Sun | Kate | Episode: "Green-Eyed Dick" |
| 1996 | Shattered Mind | | Television film |
| 1996 | Twilight Man | Kathy Robbins | Television film |
| 1996 | The Big Easy | Zelda Riley | Episode: "Murder in Mind" |
| 1996 | The Sentinel | Monique Brackley | Episode: "Deep Water" |
| 1996 | Sliders | Dr. Olivia Lujan | Episode: "The Dream Masters" |
| 1996 | Touched by an Angel | Fran | Episode: "The Homecoming: Part 1" |
| 1996–1997 | Almost Perfect | Allison | Episode: "Shelf Doubt", "K.I.S.S.", "The Laws" |
| 1997 | The Practice | Sheila | Episode: "Trial and Error" |
| 1999 | Pensacola: Wings of Gold | Joy Daly | Episode: "Lost" |
| 2000 | Murder at the Cannes Film Festival | Kaki Lamb | Television film |
| 2001–2002 | Three Sisters | Bess Bernstein-Flynn Keats | Series regular, 33 episodes |
| 2002 | ER | Janet Wilco | Episode: "Walk Like a Man" |
| 2002 | NYPD Blue | Michelle McDowell Colohan | Episodes: "One in the Nuts", "Meat Me in the Park", "Death by Cycle" |
| 2002–2003 | The Guardian | Kim McPherson | Recurring role, 4 episodes |
| 2003 | Greetings from Tucson | Lucy | Episode: "A Brand New Car" |
| 2003 | CSI: Crime Scene Investigation | Ginger | Episode: "Precious Metal" |
| 2003 | The Division | | Episodes: "Hearts & Minds", "Acts of Betrayal" |
| 2003 | Miss Match | Amy Jensen | Recurring role, 4 episodes |
| 2003–2005 | Judging Amy | Atty. Yvonne Dunbar | Recurring role, 9 episodes |
| 2004 | The Deerings | Tricia | TV pilot |
| 2005 | CSI: Miami | Carla Marshall | Episode: "Cop Killer" |
| 2005 | Grey's Anatomy | Vera Kalpana | Episode: "Deny, Deny, Deny" |
| 2006–2011 | Two and a Half Men | Lydia | Recurring role, 4 episodes |
| 2006 | Love Monkey | Karen Freed | Series regular, 8 episodes |
| 2006 | Pepper Dennis | Nadia Vadinava | Episode: "True Love Is Dead: Film at Eleven" |
| 2006–2007 | Justice | Suzanne Fulcrum | Recurring role, 6 episodes |
| 2006–2008 | 12 Miles of Bad Road | Juliet Shakespeare | Series regular, 6 episodes |
| 2007 | Boston Legal | Pat Ontario | Episode: "Tea and Sympathy" |
| 2008 | Ghost Whisperer | Betty | Episode: "Save Our Souls" |
| 2009 | Cold Case | Leigh Feldman / Foster | Episode: "Witness Protection" |
| 2009 | Burn Notice | Shannon Park | Episode: "Signals and Codes" |
| 2009 | House | Melissa | Episode: "Wilson" |
| 2009–2011 | Big Love | Beverly Ford | Recurring role, 5 episodes |
| 2010 | Justified | Caryn Carnes | Episode: "The Collection" |
| 2010 | Make It or Break It | Leslie | Episode: "If Only..." |
| 2010 | Lie to Me | Laura Cross | Episode: "The Royal We" |
| 2010–2011 | The Defenders | Linda Cole | Episodes: "Nevada v. Dennis" and "Nevada v. Donnie the Numbers Guy" |
| 2011 | Normal | Susan | TV pilot |
| 2012–2013 | Longmire | Lizzie Ambrose | Recurring role, 6 episodes |
| 2013 | Deception | Sophia Bowers | Series regular, 11 episodes |
| 2014 | The Night Shift | Dr. Flannery Mills | Episode: "Second Chances" |
| 2014–2015 | Satisfaction | Adriana | Series regular, 20 episodes |
| 2016 | Devious Maids | Shannon Greene | Recurring role, season 4, 4 episodes |
| 2017–2018 | Imposters | Sally | Series regular, 14 episodes |
| 2018 | American Woman | Lori Meltzner | Episode: "The Party" |
| 2018 | Dynasty | Ada Stone | Recurring role, 6 episodes |
| 2019 | Future Man | Athena / Dr. Hogeveen | Recurring role, 5 episodes |
| 2019–2023 | Truth Be Told | Noa Havilland | Recurring role, 19 episodes |
| 2020 | Katy Keene | Gloria Grandbilt | Series regular, 10 episodes |
| 2025–present | The Pitt | Nurse Dana Evans | Series regular, 30 episodes |
| 2025 | Daredevil: Born Again | Artemis Sledge | 4 episodes |
| 2026 | The Simpsons | Nurse (voice) | Episode: “Irrational Treasure” |
| 2026 | Count My Lies † | Tracy | Recurring role |

Key
| † | Denotes television productions that have not yet been released |

== Accolades ==
| Award | Year | Category | Nominated work | Result | Ref. |
|---|---|---|---|---|---|
| Actor Awards | 2026 | Outstanding Performance by an Ensemble in a Drama Series | The Pitt | Won | |
| Critics' Choice Awards | 2026 | Best Supporting Actress in a Drama Series | The Pitt | Won | |
| Dorian Awards | 2025 | Best Supporting TV Performance | The Pitt | Nominated | |
| Dorian Awards | 2026 | Best Supporting TV Performance – Drama | The Pitt | Nominated | |
| Gotham TV Awards | 2025 | Outstanding Supporting Performance in a Drama Series | The Pitt | Nominated | |
| Primetime Emmy Awards | 2025 | Outstanding Supporting Actress in a Drama Series | The Pitt | Won | |
| Primetime Emmy Awards | 2026 | Outstanding Supporting Actress in a Drama Series | The Pitt | Nominated | |
| TCA Awards | 2026 | Individual Achievement in Drama | The Pitt | Nominated | |
