= Hugh Courtenay, 18th Earl of Devon =

British peer, landowner, and surveyor (1942–2015)

The Right Honourable The Earl of Devon DL

Personal details
- Born: Hugh Rupert Courtenay; 5 May 1942
- Died: 18 August 2015 (aged 73)
- Spouse: Diana Watherston (m. 1967)
- Children: 4, including Charles Courtenay, 19th Earl of Devon
- Parent(s): Charles Courtenay, 17th Earl of Devon; Venetia Taylor
- Occupation: Landowner and surveyor

Hugh Rupert Courtenay, 18th Earl of Devon, DL (5 May 1942 – 18 August 2015), styled as Lord Courtenay until 1998, of Powderham Castle in Devon, was a British peer, landowner, and surveyor.

== Origins ==
He was the son and heir of Charles Christopher Courtenay, 17th Earl of Devon (1916–1998) by his wife Venetia Taylor (died 2001). From his birth in 1942, until he succeeded to the earldom in 1998, he was known by the courtesy title of Lord Courtenay.

He was a direct descendant in an unbroken male line of Robert de Courtenay (d.1242), son of Reginald II de Courtenay (d.1194) by his wife Hawise de Curcy (d.1219), heiress of the feudal barony of Okehampton in Devon. Robert married Mary de Vernon, daughter of William de Redvers, 5th Earl of Devon (d.1217), feudal baron of Plympton in Devon. From this marriage, the Courtenays later inherited the barony of Plympton in 1293 and in 1335 were declared Earls of Devon. The House of Courtenay were not Normans who "came over with William the Conqueror", as did much of the ancient English aristocracy, but were Frenchmen who were seated within the Kingdom of France, one of whom came to England some time after the Norman Conquest, having had his lands seized by the French king.

The Courtenay family of Powderham was a junior branch of the family descended from Sir Philip Courtenay (1340–1406), 5th or 6th son of Hugh Courtenay, 2nd Earl of Devon (1303–1377) of Tiverton Castle, Devon, by his wife Margaret de Bohun (d.1391), daughter and heiress of Humphrey de Bohun, 4th Earl of Hereford (d.1322), by his wife Elizabeth Plantagenet, a daughter of King Edward I. The ancient Earls of Devon of Tiverton Castle were extinguished in the 15th century during the Wars of the Roses, but the title was revived soon after for close cousins who successively died without male progeny. The Courtenays of Powderham, by then very distant relations, in 1644 created baronets, were retrospectively recognised in the 19th century by the House of Lords to have been rightful (de jure) Earls of Devon since the 16th century, being heirs male of the last earl seated at Tiverton Castle, and from that time adopted the title.

== Background and career ==
Devon was the younger child of Charles Courtenay, 17th Earl of Devon and (Sybil) Venetia Taylor, who had two other children from her previous marriage to Mark Everard Pepys, 6th Earl of Cottenham. Born the day after Exeter was bombed during the Baedeker Blitz and while his father was away in North Africa with the Coldstream Guards, it was reported that his sisters and household staff had been hiding in the cellars while his mother insisted on giving birth in the state bed rather than evacuate. He was educated at St Peter's School, Seaford and Winchester College and graduated with a B.A. degree from Magdalene College, Cambridge, in 1964. From 1971 to 1977 he served in the Royal Devon Yeomanry, retiring with the rank of captain. He held the office of Deputy Lieutenant (D.L.) of Devon in 1991.

After succeeding to the family titles in 1998, Devon was the last of the hereditary peers to make a maiden speech in the House of Lords.

== Estate management ==
Devon was an Associate of the Royal Institution of Chartered Surveyors (A.R.I.C.S.) and successfully helped the family seat at Powderham Castle move into the black. The family finances had fallen on hard times after the deaths of three earls between 1927 and 1935 brought triple death duties. By the 1970s, the family lands had shrunk by 90 per cent. The family was in talks to place Powderham in the hands of the National Trust, but the 17th earl backed out when the National Trust insisted on a £60,000 endowment. The castle was opened to the public in 1957.

The 18th earl greatly improved the estate, expanding its farmlands from 400 to 2,000 acres and reviving the 18th-century gardens and deer park. He also ran horse trials from Powderham, managed one of the leading herds of cattle in South Devon, and successfully sued the Crown to regain the family's medieval land rights on the foreshore of the estuary of the River Exe. Once regained, he quickly set up a thriving business in shellfishing and the renting of moorings. Powderham, which now sees 35,000 visitors each summer, has also been a popular events venue for concerts including Elton John and Tom Jones, and sporting events.

The earl also worked as the land agent for other estates, including Blickling Hall in Norfolk, Broughton Castle in Oxfordshire and Monteviot House in Roxburghshire.

In 2008, the earl had his licence to hold civil ceremonies at Powderham Castle revoked by Devon County Council, as he had refused permission to allow a gay civil partnership ceremony to take place there, an action the Council said was in contravention of the Equality Act 2006. He reversed his stance in 2013.

== Marriage and progeny ==
On 9 September 1967 he married Diana Frances Watherston, daughter of former Scotland rugby player Jack Watherston, by whom he had four children:

- Lady Rebecca Eildon Courtenay (b. 1969), who is married to Jeremy Lloyd Wharton.
- Lady Eleonora Venetia Courtenay (b. 1971), who is married to Edward Robert Hamilton Clarkson.
- Lady Camilla Mary Courtenay (b. 1974), who is married to Brigadier Daniel Bruce Duff.
- Charles Peregrine Courtenay, 19th Earl of Devon (b. 1975), is married and later divorced the American actress Allison Joy Langer, with two children.

== Death ==
The 18th Earl of Devon died peacefully on 18 August 2015 at the age of 73. His death was announced by his family on 20 August.

== Succession ==
He was succeeded in the earldom by his son Charles Courtenay, 19th Earl of Devon.

== Ancestry ==
Ancestors of Hugh Courtenay, 18th Earl of Devon

16. Henry Courtenay, 13th Earl of Devon (1811–1904), son of William Courtenay, 10th Earl of Devon
8. Henry Courtenay, Lord Courtenay (1836–1898)
17. Lady Anna Maria Leslie (1815–1897)
4. Frederick Courtenay, 16th Earl of Devon (1875–1935)
18. Charles Pepys, 1st Earl of Cottenham
9. Lady Evelyn Pepys (1839–1910)
19. Caroline Elizabeth Wingfield-Baker (d. 1868), daughter of William Wingfield and Lady Charlotte Maria Digby (daughter of Henry Digby, 1st Earl Digby)
2. Charles Courtenay, 17th Earl of Devon (1916–1998)
20. John Joseph Da Silva (1806–1867)
10. John Silva (1839–1923)
21. Sarah Jane Spencer Austin (1807–1894)
5. Marguerite Silva (1875–1950)
22. John Malcolm Corrie (1816–1898)
11. Mary Frances Corrie (1845–1929)
23. Fanny Wynne (1824–1893)
1. Hugh Courtenay, 18th Earl of Devon
6. Capt. John Vikris Taylor (1872–1956)
3. Sybil Venetia Taylor (d. 2001)
14. George Hopkinson (d. 1919)
7. Sybil Mary Hopkinson
30. Hon. Henry Charles Capel Somerset (1816–1905), grandson of Henry Somerset, 5th Duke of Beaufort
15. Blanche Isabella Somerset (1847–1922)
31. Alice Elizabeth O’Connell (1818–1892), daughter of Sir Maurice Charles Philip O'Connell

Peerage of England
Preceded by Charles Courtenay	Earl of Devon; 1998–2015	Succeeded by Charles Courtenay
