= Charles Pepys =

Charles Pepys may refer to:

- Charles Pepys, 1st Earl of Cottenham (1781–1851), English lawyer, judge and politician
- Charles Pepys, 8th Earl of Cottenham (1948–2000), English cricketer, equestrian and businessman
