= Digby Pepys, 7th Earl of Cottenham =

English businessman, peer, and member of the House of Lords (1907-1968)

John Digby Thomas Pepys, 7th Earl of Cottenham (14 June 1907 – 12 May 1968) was an English peer, baronet, business man, and breeder of Thoroughbred horses. He was a member of the House of Lords from 1943 until his death in 1968.

The third son of Kenelm Pepys, 4th Earl of Cottenham, he was educated at Eton College and the Royal Military College, Sandhurst, from where he was commissioned as a Lieutenant into the 10th Royal Hussars.

In 1933, Digby Pepys became managing director of Peter Merchant Ltd, an industrial catering company, and in 1946 also of Lockhart Group Ltd. He retired as managing director of both in 1952 but was also chairman of Lockhart Group from 1946 to 1960.

In 1943, he succeeded an older brother, Mark Pepys, as Earl of Cottenham, Viscount Crowhurst, of Crowhurst, Surrey, Baron Cottenham, of Cottenham, Cambridgeshire, and as a Baronet, of Wimpole Street.

Cottenham was a distant cousin of the diarist Samuel Pepys and was head of the Pepys family. When canvassed in 1961 on how to pronounce the surname, his secretary told the press "I can assure you that Lord Cottenham pronounces it Peppiss."

Cottenham was later a director of Lingfield Park Racecourse and of Trust Houses Ltd between 1962 and his death. A successful bloodstock breeder, he was a member of the Committee of Tattersalls from 1957 to 1962 and was senior steward of the National Hunt Committee in 1964. He died in 1968, aged 60, and was then of Hungerhill House, Coolham, near Horsham in West Sussex.

On 3 October 1933, Cottenham married Lady Angela Isabel Nellie Nevill, a daughter of Guy Larnach-Nevill, 4th Marquess of Abergavenny and a sister of Lord Rupert Nevill. They had three daughters and a son:

- Lady Marye Isabel Pepys (1934–1958), who married Luke White, 5th Baron Annaly, and was the mother of Luke White, 6th Baron Annaly
- Lady Davina Rose Pepys (1940–1973), who married Sir Kenneth Drake Kleinwort, 3rd Baronet and was the mother of Sir Richard Drake Kleinwort (born 1960)
- Lady Gillian Angela Pepys (1941–2008), who married Harry McGowan, 3rd Baron McGowan, and was the mother of Harry McGowan, 4th Baron McGowan
- Kenelm Charles Everard Digby Pepys, Viscount Crowhurst (1948–2000)

On his death, Cottenham was succeeded by his son.

Peerage of the United Kingdom
Preceded by Mark Pepys	Earl of Cottenham; 1943–1968	Succeeded by Charles Pepys
Preceded by Mark Pepys	Baron Cottenham; 1943–1968	Succeeded by Charles Pepys
Baronetage of Great Britain
Preceded by Mark Pepys	Baronet (of Brook Street); 1943–1968	Succeeded by Charles Pepys
Baronetage of the United Kingdom
Preceded by Mark Pepys	Baronet (of Wimpole Street); 1943–1968	Succeeded by Charles Pepys
