= Jack Watherston =

- Full name: Jack Greenshields Watherston
- Born: 24 August 1909 Edinburgh, Scotland
- Died: 17 November 1990 (aged 81) Roxburghshire, Scotland
- School: Sedbergh School
- University: Corpus Christi College

Rugby union career
- Position: Flanker
International career
Years	Team	Apps	(Points)
1934	Scotland	2	(0)

Jack Greenshields Watherston (24 August 1909 — 17 November 1990) was a Scottish international rugby union player.

Born in Edinburgh, Watherston was educated at Sedbergh School and Corpus Christi College, Cambridge.

A flanker, Watherston gained blues in varsity rugby at Cambridge University. He played his rugby in Scotland for Edinburgh Wanderers and Jedburgh. In 1934, Watherston was capped twice for Scotland during their Home Nations campaign, against Ireland at Murrayfield and England at Twickenham.

Watherson's daughter Diana was married to British peer Hugh Courtenay, 18th Earl of Devon. His grandson Charles Courtenay, 19th Earl of Devon, is a Member of the House of Lords.

== See also ==
- List of Scotland national rugby union players
