= Baron McGowan =

Barony in the Peerage of the United Kingdom

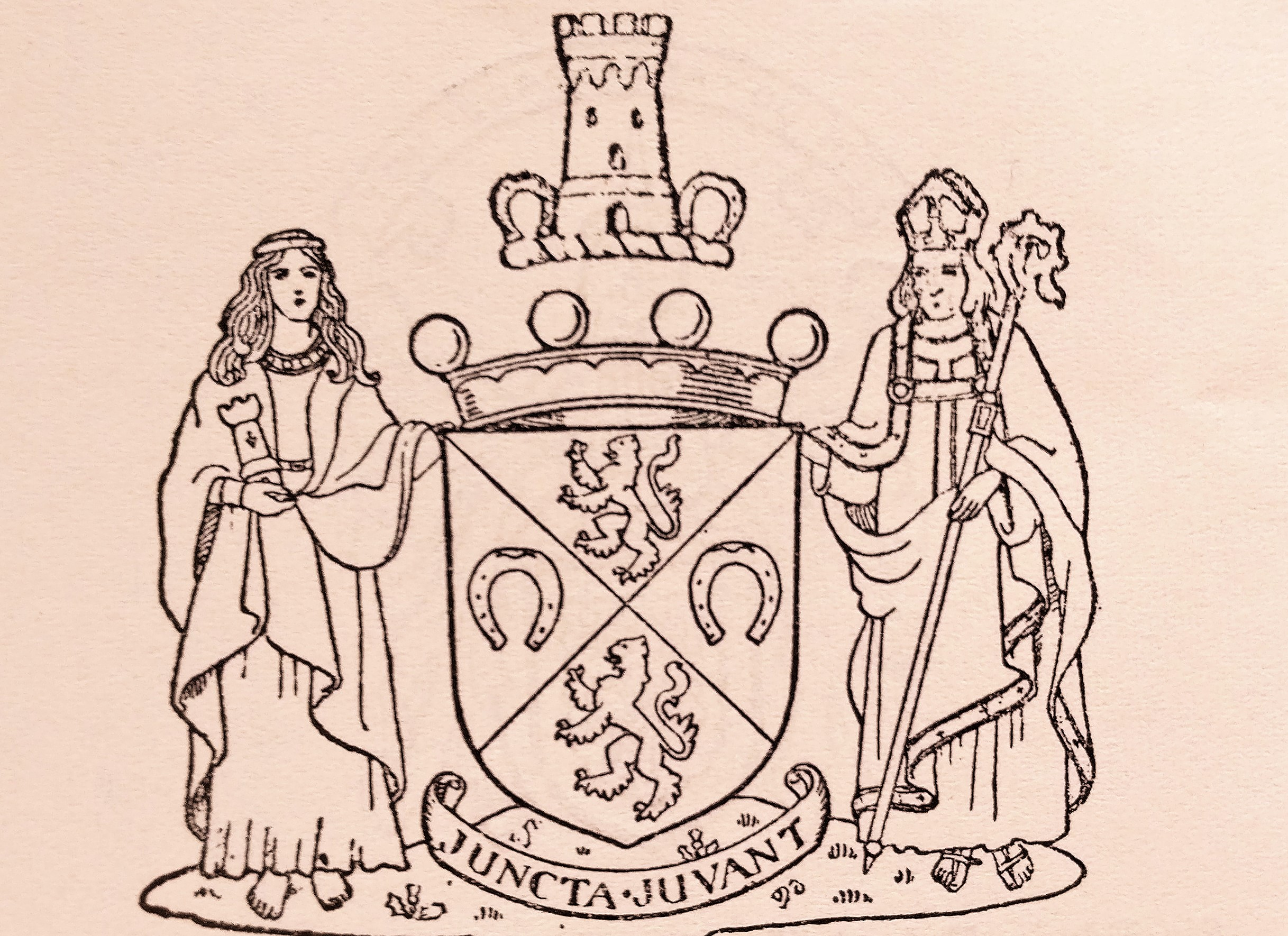
- Created by: King George VI
- Peerage: Peerage of the United Kingdom
- First holder: Sir Harry McGowan
- Present holder: Harry John Charles McGowan, 4th Baron McGowan.
- Heir presumptive: Hon. Dominic James Wilson McGowan
- Seats: Highway Hall, West Froyle
- Former seats: Bragborough Hall, Northamptonshire
- Motto: Juncta Juvant (Union is strength)

Baron McGowan, of Ardeer in the County of Ayr Scotland, is a title in the Peerage of the United Kingdom. The current title holder is Harry John Charles McGowan, 4th Baron McGowan.

== Baron McGowan, of Ardeer ==
The title was created in 1937 for Sir Harry McGowan, Chairman of Imperial Chemical Industries. As of 2014 the title is held by his great-grandson, the fourth Baron, who succeeded his father in 2003.

The family seat is Highway House, Lower Froyle, Hampshire.

== Ancestry ==
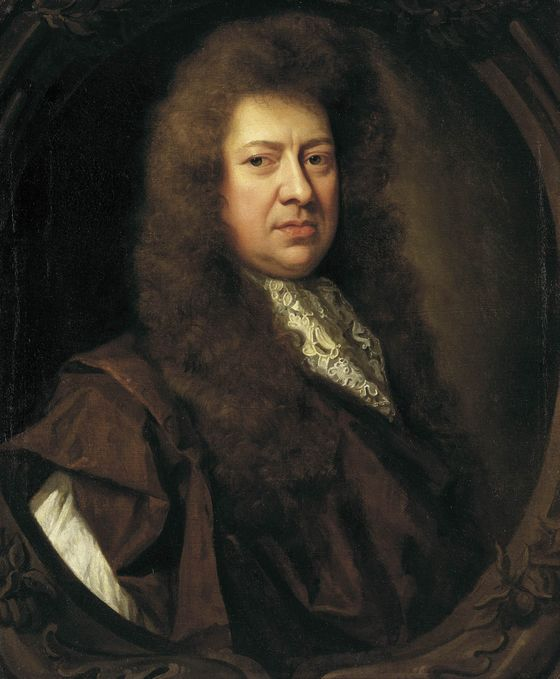
Samuel Pepys painted by Sir Godfrey Kneller in 1689

The McGowan family is related to the Earls of Cottenham and the renowned Diarist, MP and Naval administrator Samuel Pepys through the current Baron's mother Lady Gillian Angela Pepys, daughter of John Digby Thomas Pepys, 7th Earl of Cottenham. The family is also descended from the House of Neville through Lady Angela Isabel Nevill, grandmother of the 4th Baron. This connection names Kings Edward III, Edward IV and Richard III among the family's ancestors.

The current title holder, Harry John Charles McGowan's immediate family include his sisters, Hon. Emma Louisa Angela McGowan and Hon. Annabel Kate Cory McGowan, and his daughters, Hon. Sophie Isabella Fox McGowan and Hon. Martha Davina Fox McGowan.

== Barons McGowan (1937) ==
- Harry Duncan McGowan, 1st Baron McGowan (1874–1961)
- Harry Wilson McGowan, 2nd Baron McGowan (1906–1966)
- Harry Duncan Cory McGowan, 3rd Baron McGowan (1938–2003)
- Harry John Charles McGowan, 4th Baron McGowan (b. 1971)

The heir presumptive is the present holder's uncle Hon. Dominic James Wilson McGowan (b. 1951).

=== Line of Succession ===
- Harry Duncan McGowan, 1st Baron McGowan (1874–1961)
  - Harry Wilson McGowan, 2nd Baron McGowan (1906–1986)
    - Harry Duncan McGowan, 3rd Baron McGowan (1938–2003)
      - Harry John Charles McGowan, 4th Baron McGowan (born 1971)
    - (1) Hon. Dominic James Wilson McGowan (b. 1951)
    - (2) Hon. Mungo Alexander Cansh McGowan (b. 1956)
      - (3) James Alexander Cory McGowan (b. 1985)

== Arms ==
Coat of arms of Baron McGowan
Crest A tower Or between two horseshoes Proper. Escutcheon Quarterly per saltire Argent and Azure two lions rampant in pale Gules and as many horseshoes in fess Proper Supporters Dexter a figure representing St Barbara Proper holding in the exterior hand a tower Or sinister a figure representing St Kentigern Proper holding in the exterior hand his Crozier Or. Motto Juncta Juvant (Union Is Strength)

== Ancestry & family tree ==
(Please click "show" to Expand the box below)

Ancestors of Baron McGowan

8. Sir Harry Duncan McGowan, 1st Baron McGowan, KBE
4. Harry Wilson McGowan, 2nd Baron McGowan
9. Jean Boyle Young
2. Harry Duncan Cory McGowan, 3rd Baron McGowan
10. Sir James Herbert Cory
5. Bessie Carmen Cory
11. Elizabeth Cansh Walker CBE
1. Harry John Charles McGowan; Hon. Louisa McGowan Hon. Anabel McGowan
12. Kenelm Charles Edward Pepys, 4th Earl of Cottenham
6. John Digby Thomas Pepys, 7th Earl of Cottenham
13. Lady Rose Leigh
3. Lady Gillian Angela Pepys
14. Guy Temple Montacute Nevill, 4th Marquess of Abergavenny
7. Lady Angela Isabel Nevill
15. Isabel Nellie Larnach
