= Powderham Castle =

Manor house in Devon, England

Coordinates: 50°38′34.7″N 3°27′35.9″W

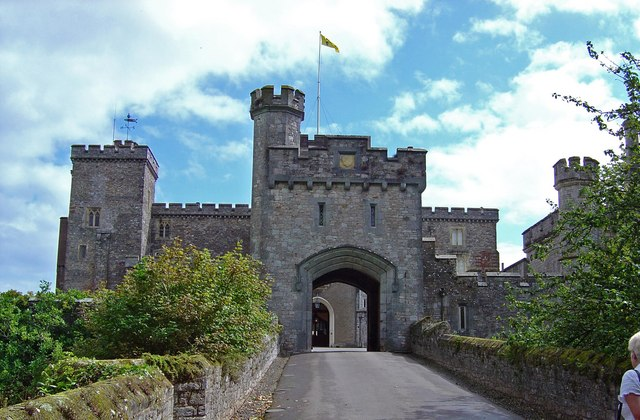
- Gatehouse
- Interactive map of the Powderham Castle area

General information
- Architectural style: Gothic
- Location: Powderham, Devon, United Kingdom
- Construction started: 14th century (medieval core)
- Renovated: 18th century
- Owner: Courtenay family

Website
- Official Site

Powderham Castle is a fortified manor house in the civil parish of Powderham, Devon, 6 miles (9.7 km) south of Exeter and 1/4 mile (0.4 km) north-east of the village of Kenton, where the main public entrance gates are located. It is a Grade I listed building. The park and gardens are Grade II* listed in the National Register of Historic Parks and Gardens.

It is on flat ground on the west bank of the River Exe estuary where it is joined by its tributary the River Kenn. On the opposite side of the Exe is the small village of Lympstone. Starting with a structure built sometime after 1390, the present castle was expanded and altered extensively in the 18th and 19th centuries. The castle is the seat of the Courtenay family, Earls of Devon.

== Origin of the name ==
The manor of Powderham is named from the ancient Dutch word polder, and means "the hamlet of the reclaimed marsh-land".

== History ==
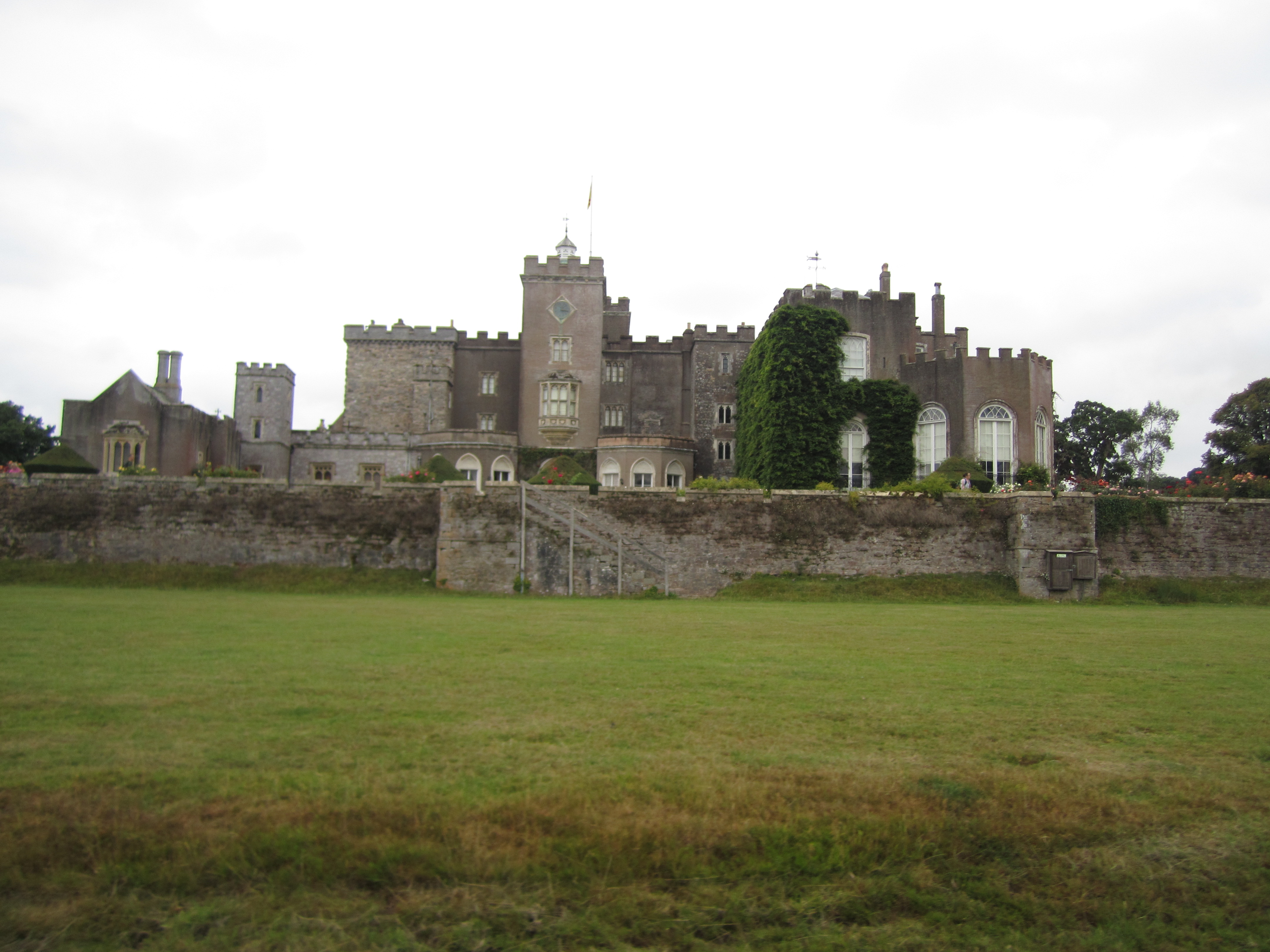
Powderham Castle, east front, viewed from the deer park

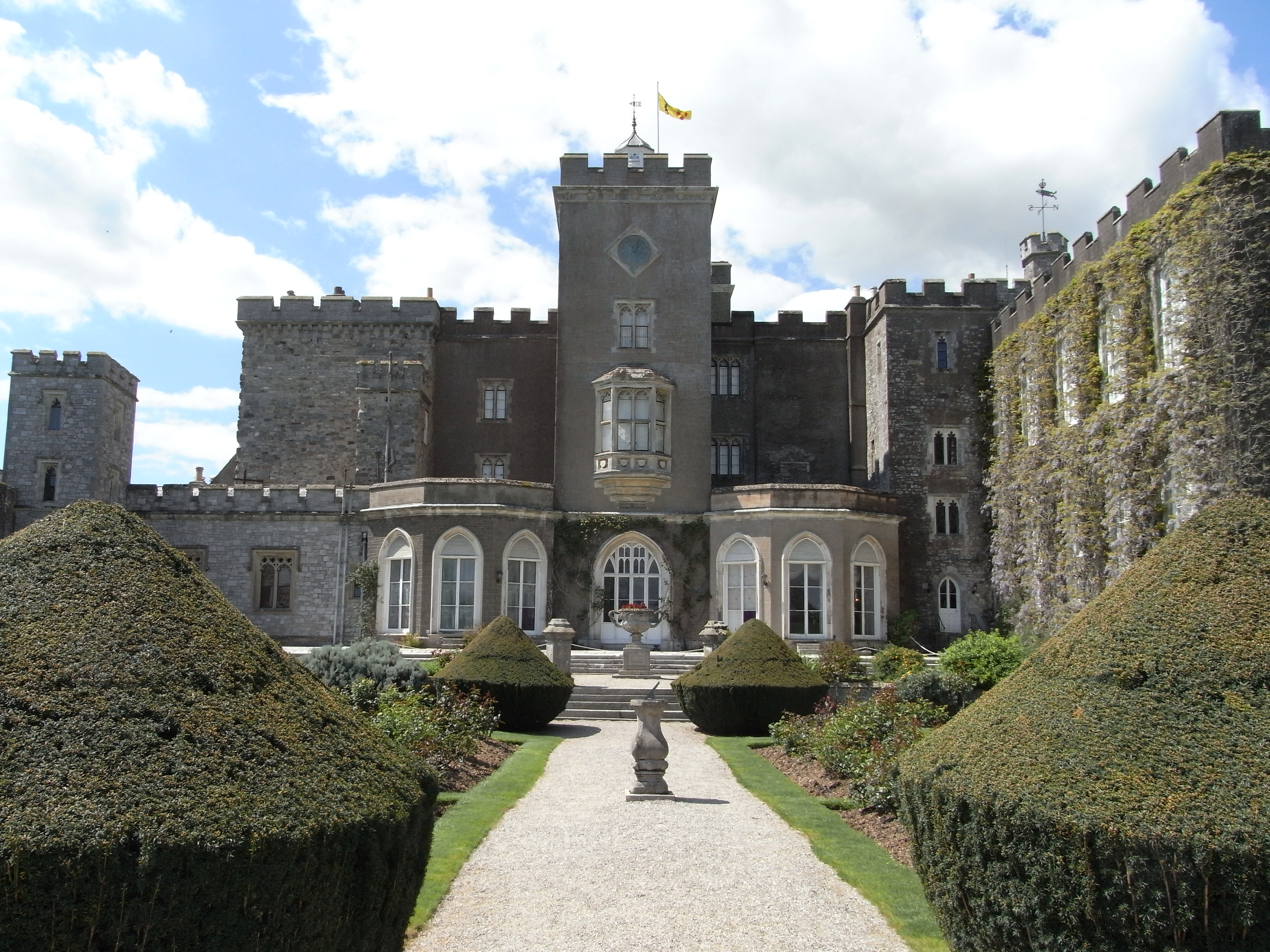
Powderham Castle, Devon, east (garden) front. The wing projecting forwards at the right contains the second library, built 1766–69. The central tower and flanking single-height bow-windows date from 1710 to 1727. The tower in the corner-angle to the right and the main full-height range behind date from 1390 to 1450.

At some time after 1390 the medieval core of the present structure was built by Sir Philip Courtenay (d. 1406), the 5th or 6th son of the 2nd Earl of Devon (d. 1377). The Earls of Devon were seated at Tiverton Castle until 1556, and their cousins of this cadet line known as "Courtenay of Powderham" continued to exist in parallel, not always on amicable terms, as prominent county gentry, arguably the leading and most prestigious gentry family of Devon, actively engaged in the local administration of Devon as JP's, sheriffs and MP's. From 1556, with the extinction of the senior line of Courtenay of Tiverton, the Courtenays of Powderham became de jure Earls of Devon, and became de facto Earls from 1831 when the title was confirmed to them in law. They had obtained the right to sit in the House of Lords when created Viscounts in 1762.

The original building on the site was a fortified manor house; the appellation "castle" was added probably no earlier than the 17th century. The building has never been a true castle, that is to say with a keep and moat, although it did possess a curtain wall and yard on the east side (now the rose garden) as shown in the 1745 engraving by Buck. Leland mentioned a barbican or bulwark in this area, but these were demolished as part of the 18th-century landscaping works designed to provide an uninterrupted view from the lower rooms towards the Exe Estuary. Many castle-like elements on the west front (main entrance) were added in the 19th century. The gatehouse was built between 1845 and 1847 to a design by Charles Fowler. The tall rectangular structure beyond with a tower to the north is essentially the original fortified manor house. The projection from the lower storey to the north in lighter stone with three Gothic-style windows is the Victorian dining hall, designed by Fowler.

=== Wars of the Roses ===
During the Wars of the Roses the enemies of the Courtenay Earls of Devon of Tiverton Castle were the Bonville family of Shute. Their distant cousin at Powderham, Sir William Courtenay (d. 1485) married Margaret Bonville, daughter of the 1st Baron Bonville (1392–1461), which confirmed Powderham as a Bonville stronghold against the Earls of Devon. On 3 November 1455, the 5th Earl of Devon (1414–1458), at the head of a private army of 1,000 men, seized control of Exeter and its castle and laid siege to Powderham for two months. Lord Bonville attempted to raise the siege and approached from the east, crossing the River Exe; he was unsuccessful and was driven back by the earl's forces. On 15 December 1455 the Earl of Devon and Lord Bonville met decisively at the First Battle of Clyst Heath in Exeter, where Bonville was defeated and after which the earl sacked and pillaged Shute.

=== Civil War ===
During the Civil War Powderham Castle was garrisoned by 300 Royalist soldiers under the command of Sir Hugh Meredith. In December 1645 a Parliamentarian detachment under the command of Sir Thomas Fairfax tried, without initial success, to capture it but it fell on 25 January 1646 to Col. Robert Hammond. The castle was badly damaged in the assault and remained, in places, open to the elements until the early 1700s when it was repaired by Sir William Courtenay, 2nd Baronet (d. 1735).

== Description of interior ==
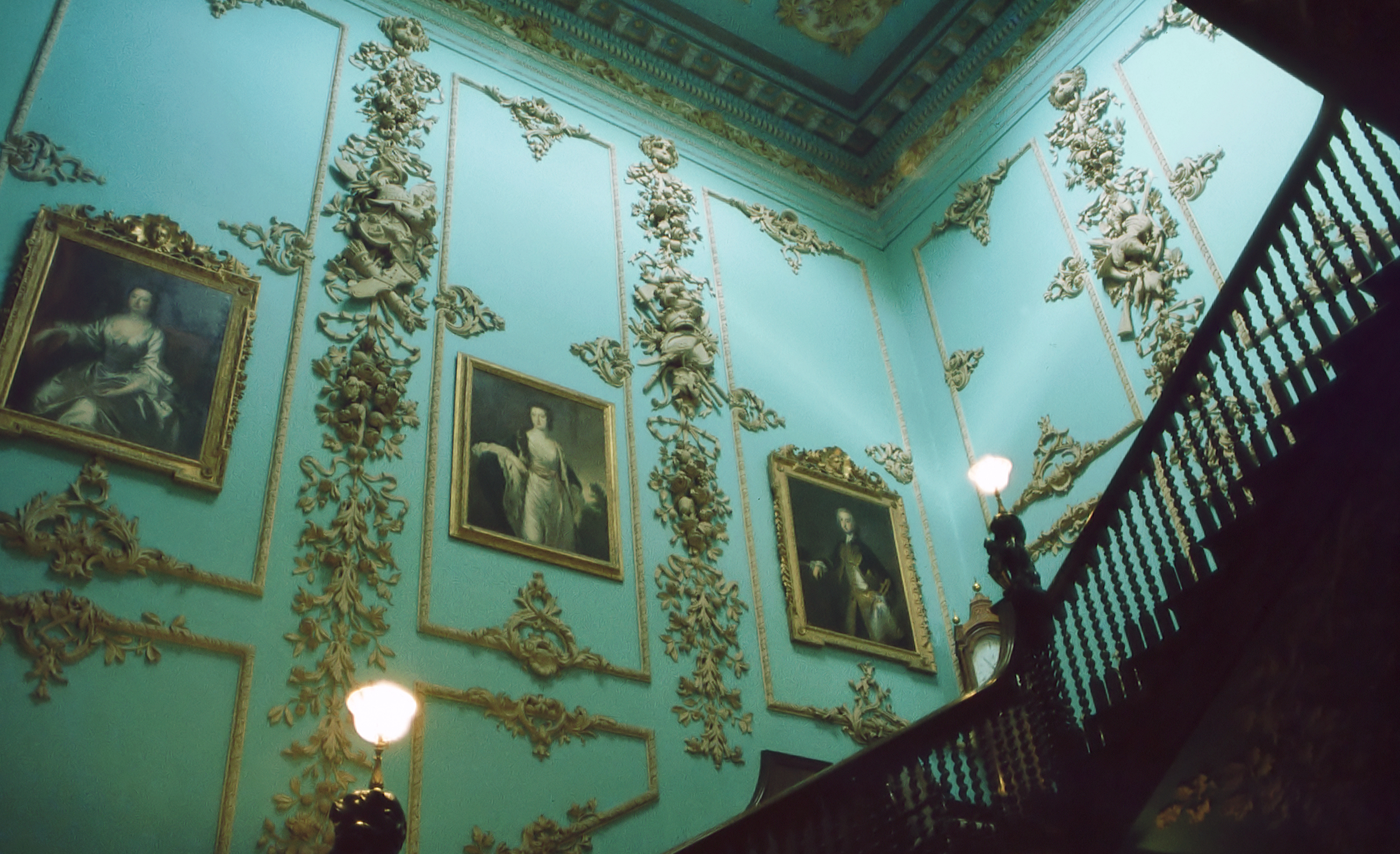
Staircase Hall, Powderham Castle

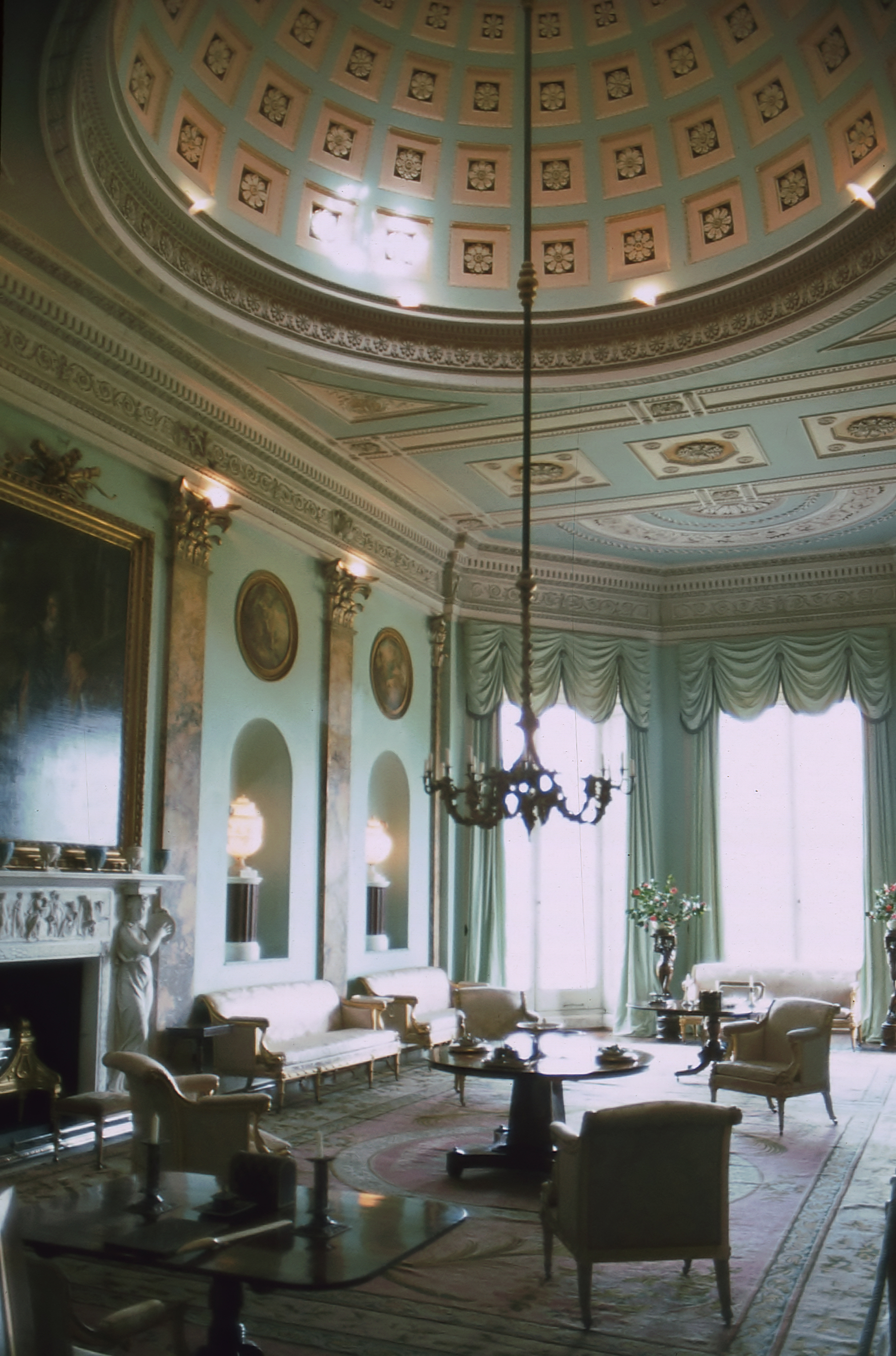
Music Room, Powderham Castle

The house is centred on the 14th- and 15th-century thickly-walled double-height rectangular building formerly comprising from north to south the withdrawing room, great hall, screens passage and kitchens, which are now represented in the same orientation by the ante-room, Staircase hall, Marble hall and Victorian kitchen.

=== Marble Hall ===
The Marble Hall, named from its black and white marble floor, was completed in 1755 and forms the lower and southern part of the former medieval great hall, which was divided by an internal wall in the early 18th century into Staircase hall and Marble hall. Originally it was double height, as high as the staircase hall to the north, before the ceiling was added in the 18th century to form bedrooms above. At the same time the staircase was inserted into the upper part to form the staircase hall.

The screens passage was located in this end of the hall. The timber screen which formed the north side of the screens passage was demolished at the time of the partition, but three medieval Gothic-arched doorways through the south stone wall of the screens passage into the kitchen remain. A single more flatly arched doorway remains high up on the south wall, which formed the entrance to the wooden minstrels' gallery overhanging the great hall.

The Marble Hall is used as a sitting room which has an 18th-century fireplace. Contents of the room include a 14 feet (4.3 m) high longcase clock made about 1745 by William Stumbels of Totnes; a large 17th-century Brussels tapestry with rustic farm-yard scenery after Teniers above the fireplace; and a 1553 carved wooden over-mantel decorated with the Courtenay arms. Two portraits of the present Earl of Devon and his wife hang on the north wall above the wooden panelling.

=== Other ===
The house has a mixture of medieval features and fine 18th-century decoration. Upstairs there is a narwhal tusk, sometimes said to be a unicorn horn able to detect poison.

=== Memorial chimneypiece in Dining Hall ===
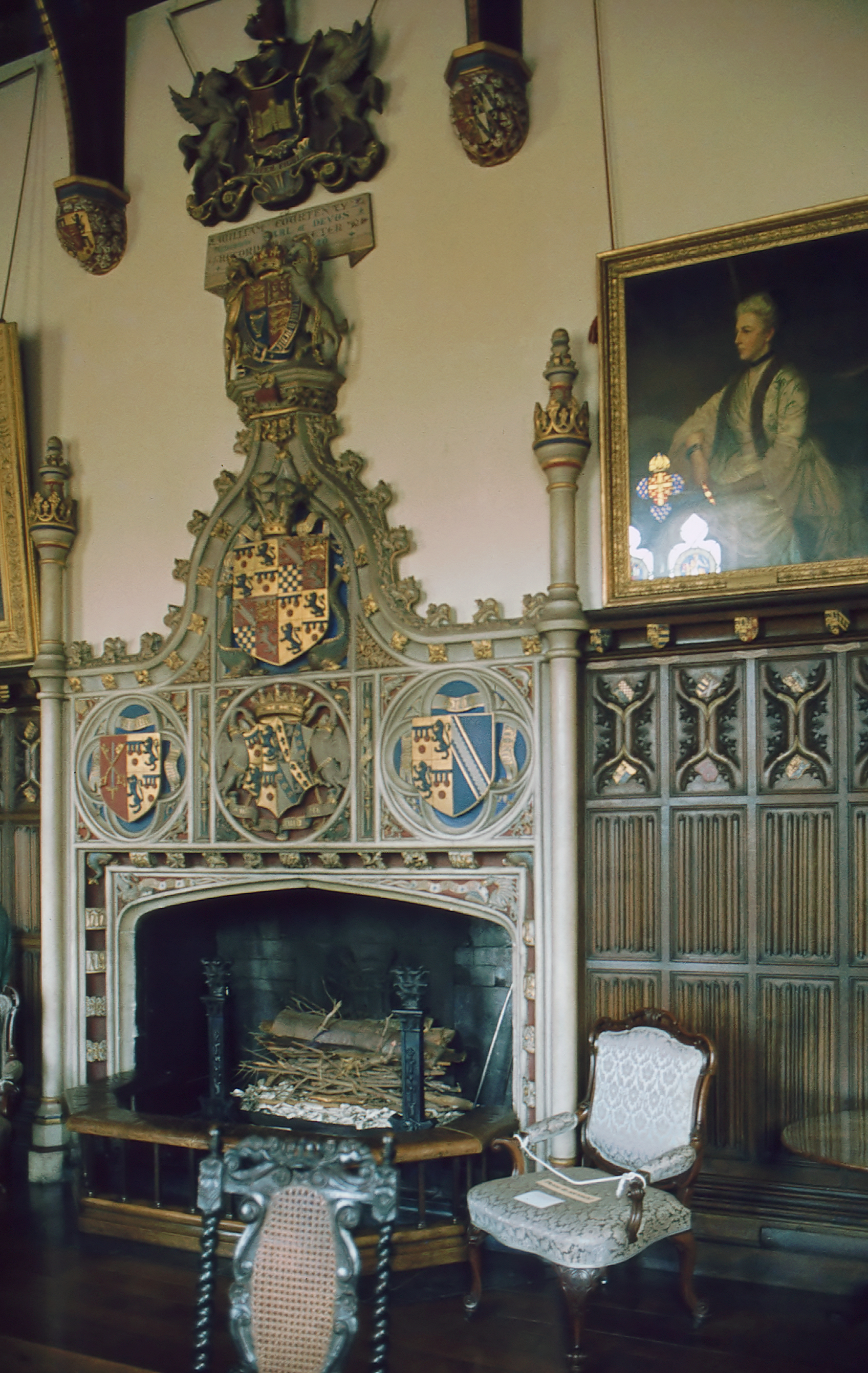
The heraldic chimneypiece (c. 1860) in the Dining Hall

The 11th Earl of Devon (d. 1888) installed a heraldic chimneypiece in the Dining Hall in memory of his grandfather Reginald Courtenay (1741–1803), Bishop of Exeter from 1797 to 1803, and of his parents. The Dining Hall was built by his father, the 10th Earl of Devon (d. 1859), between 1847 and his death in 1859, and the 11th Earl completed the internal decorations in 1860, including the linen fold panelling containing several dozen ancestral heraldic shields. It is copied from the medieval chimneypiece in the Bishop's Palace, Exeter, installed c. 1485 by Peter Courtenay (d. 1492), Bishop of Exeter, a younger son of Sir Philip Courtenay (1404–1463) of Powderham. The armorials on the lowest row are from left to right:

- Arms of Bishop Reginald Courtenay: See of Exeter impaling Courtenay (grandfather of 11th Earl of Devon)
- Arms of William Courtenay, 10th Earl of Devon (d. 1859), impaling the arms of his wife Hariet Leslie Pepys: Quarterly 1st & 4th: Sable, on a bend or between two nag's heads erased argent three fleurs-de-lis of the field (Pepys, Baronets of Juniper Hill); 2nd & 3rd: Argent, on a bend azure three buckles or (Leslie, Earls of Rothes). (Parents of 11th Earl of Devon). The supporters are two of the Bohun swans, which bird was used by that family, from which came the wife of Hugh Courtenay, 2nd Earl of Devon (d. 1377), heiress of Powderham, as a heraldic badge. In the spandrels are two dolphins, a badge of the Courtenays. These arms can be seen on a brass plate on their monument in Powderham Church, itself a copy of the 15th-century Courtenay monument in Colyton Church, Devon.
- Arms of 11th Earl of Devon impaling arms of his wife Elizabeth Fortescue.

A further copy of the Courtenay Exeter Bishop's Palace chimneypiece can be found, in Italian grey marble, at Kentwell Hall in Suffolk, bearing the arms of the Clopton and Logan families.

== Modern times ==
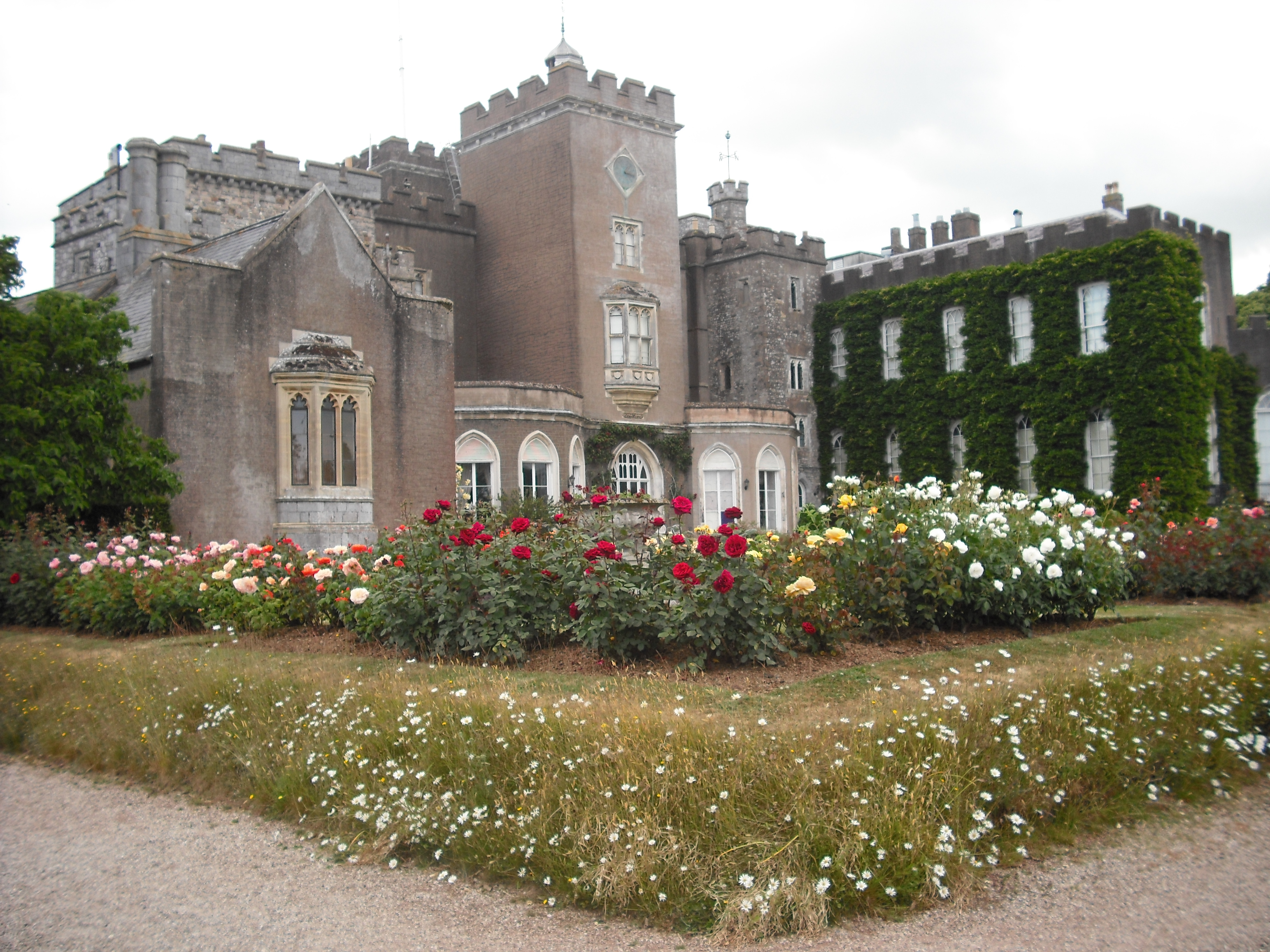
Powderham Castle and Rose Garden from the south-east, an identical view to which was engraved by Samuel Buck in 1745 (above)

Since 1745 the second library has extended the chapel wing, the two low rooms either side of the clock tower have been converted to bow-window fronts, and the castellated gatehouse tower, which might have blocked this view, has been demolished. In addition, the harbour on the River Kenn, which here flows into the River Exe, has been altered by landscaping.

Powderham Castle has been a Grade I listed building since 1952, and recognised as an internationally important structure. The staircase, hall, music room and master bedroom of the house were used as locations for the 1993 film The Remains of the Day. The house was also used as a setting for a recent film comedy, Churchill: The Hollywood Years.

On 3 December 2008, the earl auctioned off the Courtenay Compendium, a 14th-century manuscript discovered in Powderham. The castle's licence to host wedding ceremonies was revoked with effect from 1 January 2009 after the 18th Earl of Devon refused a gay couple use of the building to hold their civil partnership ceremony because it did not fit with his religious beliefs. On 29 September 2009, the Earl auctioned some items from the castle at Sotheby's in London. The sale raised £1,013,638, which was used to pay off debts. He denied that the auction was prompted by the loss of revenue from weddings. Subsequently, the Earl handed control of the estate to his son, Charles, Lord Courtenay, now the 19th Earl of Devon. The licence to host weddings, civil ceremonies and civil partnerships at the Castle has now been reinstated.

In 2017, Mary Berry visited and filmed an hour-long programme as part of her 4-part series, Mary Berry's Country House Secrets, broadcast on BBC One.

Powderham Castle features as the photographic location of the rebranding of the Historic Houses Association in 2018. In 2018 the Castle opened up new rooms, and previous private family-only areas as part of two new guided tours, the first time the tours have been altered since opening in the 1950s.

=== Concerts and Events ===
On 2 August 2004, Irish boy band Westlife held a concert for their Turnaround Tour supporting their album Turnaround.

Rock band Status Quo played a concert at Powderham Castle in 2003, in support of their Riffs album. The band played there again in 2009, alongside other performers including ABC, Go West, Kid Creole and the Coconuts, Howard Jones, Nik Kershaw, Cutting Crew, Doctor and the Medics, Altered Images and Marc Almond.

Powderham Castle hosted BBC Radio 1's Big Weekend in May 2016, featuring Ellie Goulding, Coldplay, The 1975, Craig David, Nick Jonas, and Iggy Azalea. Since the Big Weekend, Powderham has hosted concerts by artists such as Noel Gallagher's High Flying Birds, Little Mix, Bryan Adams and Tom Jones.

In 2019 Powderham Castle started running its own Food Festival (Powderham Food Festival) which has food and drink stalls from across the West Country and attracts a large and diverse audience of visitors.

As a result of the COVID-19 pandemic, Powderham started hosting a Christmas light trail and experience (named Christmas at the Castle).

== In popular culture ==
In 1924, the Great Western Railway (GWR) named a 4-6-0 'Castle class' locomotive "Powderham Castle"; the main GWR line from Exeter to Plymouth runs alongside the castle grounds and passengers can see the castle from the train as they pass.

== Sources ==
- Cherry, Bridget & Pevsner, Nikolaus, The Buildings of England: Devon, London, 1991, pp. 692–5
- French, Daniel (Ed.), Powderham Castle: Historic Family Home of the Earls of Devon, 2011. Visitor guidebook.
