= Three Sisters (American TV series) =

- Also known as: These Women
- Genre: Sitcom
- Created by: Eileen Heisler; DeAnn Heline
- Starring: Katherine LaNasa; David Alan Basche; Vicki Lewis; Peter Bonerz; Dyan Cannon
- Composer: W. G. Snuffy Walden
- Country of origin: United States
- Original language: English
- No. of seasons: 2
- No. of episodes: 35 (4 unaired)

Production
- Executive producers: Eileen Heisler; DeAnn Heline
- Producer: Werner Walian
- Camera setup: Multi-camera
- Running time: 30 minutes
- Production companies: Blackie and Blondie Productions; NBC Studios

Original release
- Network: NBC
- Release: January 9, 2001 – February 5, 2002

Three Sisters is an American sitcom television series created by Eileen Heisler and DeAnn Heline, that aired on NBC for two seasons from January 9, 2001, to February 5, 2002.

== Summary ==
Steven Keats narrates the story of his life in Los Angeles with his wife, Bess, their new baby... and her two omnipresent neurotic sisters, and interfering parents. Plots revolved around the young couple's efforts to lead a normal life through Bess's family's craziness and her people-pleasing personality. Guest stars included Valerie Harper and Howard Hesseman as Steven's divorced parents, Merle and Jerry Keats.

== Cast ==
- David Alan Basche as Steven Keats
- Katherine LaNasa as Bess Bernstein-Flynn Keats
- Vicki Lewis as Nora Bernstein-Flynn
- A.J. Langer as Annie Bernstein-Flynn
- Dyan Cannon as Honey Bernstein-Flynn
- Peter Bonerz as George Bernstein-Flynn
- Edward Kerr as Jasper 'Jake' Riley
- Brian Scolaro as Gordon
- Paul Hipp Elliot

== Episodes ==
=== Series overview ===
Season	Episodes	Originally released	
Season	Episodes	First released	Last released
1	16	January 9, 2001	May 8, 2001
2	19	September 25, 2001	February 5, 2002

=== Season 1 (2001) ===
No. overall	No. in season	Title	Directed by	Written by	Original release date	Prod. code	Viewers (millions)
1	1	"Pilot"	Pamela Fryman	Eileen Heisler & DeAnn Heline	January 9, 2001	64000	16.31
2	2	"My Birth and Welcome to It"	Andrew Tsao	Eileen Heisler & DeAnn Heline	January 16, 2001	64002	15.78
3	3	"Masters of Intervention"	Lee Shallat Chemel	Lester Lewis	January 23, 2001	64004	12.79
4	4	"The Dry Spell"	Pamela Fryman	Maria Semple	January 30, 2001	64003	14.66
5	5	"The In-Laws"	Gail Mancuso	David Measer	February 6, 2001	64012	12.21
6	6	"Summer of Chocolate"	Lee Shallat-Chemel	Matt Goldman	February 13, 2001	64006	11.36
7	7	"The Faculty Party"	Jay Sandrich	Lester Lewis	February 20, 2001	64009	13.21
8	8	"The Rooster"	Unknown	Unknown	February 27, 2001	64010	10.49
9	9	"The New Guy"	Gail Mancuso	Rob Bragin	March 6, 2001	64007	13.43
10	10	"Sisters: Undressed"	Lee Shallat Chemel	Katy Ballard	March 13, 2001	64005	10.49
11	11	"Blame the Messenger"	Gail Mancuso	Matt Goldman	March 20, 2001	64008	10.57
12	12	"Work-Related"	Unknown	Unknown	March 27, 2001	64014	10.77
13	13	"My Best Friend's Girl"	Unknown	Unknown	April 3, 2001	64011	9.44
14	14	"It's a Wonderful Wife"	Gail Mancuso	Unknown	April 10, 2001	64013	8.99
15	15	"Mother's Day"	Gail Mancuso	DeAnn Heline & Eileen Heisler	May 1, 2001	64015	11.89
16	16	"Sister Break"	Gail Mancuso	Unknown	May 8, 2001	64016	10.76

=== Season 2 (2001–02) ===
No. overall	No. in season	Title	Directed by	Written by	Original release date	Prod. code	Viewers (millions)
17	1	"Two Steps Forward, One Step Back"	Unknown	Unknown	September 25, 2001	64501	7.70
18	2	"Critical Reaction"	Steve Zuckerman	Rob Bragin	October 2, 2001	64502	7.65
19	3	"Three"	Peter Bonerz	Lester Lewis	October 9, 2001	64503	7.63
20	4	"A Shot in the Dark"	Gail Mancuso	Katy Ballard	October 16, 2001	64505	6.71
21	5	"Don't Be Thrown"	Leonard R. Garner, Jr.	Maria Semple	October 23, 2001	64504	6.29
22	6	"Halloween 1"	Gail Mancuso	Bill Daly	October 30, 2001	64506	7.23
23	7	"A Date with Destiny: Parts 1 & 2"	Gail Mancuso Leonard R. Garner, Jr.	Eileen Heisler & DeAnn Heline	November 6, 2001	64507	7.31
24	8	"A Date with Destiny: Parts 1 & 2"	Gail Mancuso Leonard R. Garner, Jr.	Eileen Heisler & DeAnn Heline	November 6, 2001	64508	7.31
25	9	"Three Thanksgivings, One Turkey"	Jay Sandrich	Lester Lewis	November 29, 2001	64509	11.36
26	10	"Is It Me?"	Mark Cendrowski	Peter Murrieta	December 11, 2001	64510	5.89
27	11	"The Manny"	Jay Sandrich	Rob Bragin	December 18, 2001	64511	6.48
28	12	"Dog Day Afternoon"	Peter Bonerz	Katy Ballard	January 8, 2002	64512	7.04
29	13	"The Sister Equinox"	Steve Zuckerman	Bill Daly	January 15, 2002	64513	6.38
30	14	"Changing Rooms"	Steve Zuckerman	Lester Lewis	January 29, 2002	64514	7.79
31	15	"Best Laid Plans"	Unknown	Unknown	February 5, 2002	64515	8.73
32	16	"He Ain't Heavy, He's My Brother"	N/A	N/A	Unaired	64516	N/A
33	17	"The Song"	N/A	N/A	Unaired	64517	N/A
34	18	"'Twas the Night Before"	N/A	N/A	Unaired	64519	N/A
35	19	"Deep Issue Massage"	N/A	N/A	Unaired	64518	N/A
