= A. J. Langer =

American actress (born 1974)

Allison, Countess of Devon
- Born: Allison Joy Langer; May 22, 1974 (age 52); Columbus, Ohio, U.S.
- Occupation: Actress
- Years active: 1990–2007, 2011–present
- Spouse: Charles Courtenay, 19th Earl of Devon (m. 2004; div. 2026)
- Children: 2

Allison Joy Langer (born May 22, 1974), commonly known by her stage name A. J. Langer, is an American actress. She is known for her roles as Rayanne Graff on the American television series My So-Called Life and Caroline Larkin on the American television series Baywatch. In 2004, she married Charles Courtenay, 19th Earl of Devon and took on the management of Powderham Castle, the Courtenay family seat in Exminster. She and Lord Devon divorced in 2026.

== Early years ==
Born in Columbus, Ohio, Allison Joy Langer moved to the San Fernando Valley with her family at age five. When she joined an otherwise all-boys baseball league at age eight, her teammates considered the name "Allison" to be too feminine, and began calling her by her initials, "A.J." She has one older brother, Kirk.

== Career ==
After many guest starring roles on several television shows, including The Wonder Years, and her first series regular in Drexell's Class, Langer was cast as Rayanne Graff on My So-Called Life. She also starred as a series regular in the sitcoms It's Like, You Know... and Three Sisters, as well as the drama series Eyes. Her film appearances include John Carpenter's Escape from L.A. and Wes Craven's horror film The People Under the Stairs.

In 2011, after a six-year acting hiatus, Langer appeared in 14 episodes of Private Practice in the recurring role of Erica Warner. She left the show in 2012 following the death of her character.

== Personal life ==
Langer married attorney Charles Courtenay, the son of Hugh Courtenay, 18th Earl of Devon, in a civil ceremony in 2004. A formal wedding took place on April 30, 2005, in Los Angeles.

In January 2014, she and her husband permanently relocated their family to London, and to the family seat at Powderham Castle in May 2015. The couple announced their separation, and intention to divorce, in November 2023. In February 2024, the couple filed to dismiss their earlier divorce application "without prejudice." They divorced in 2026.

The couple has two children, a daughter and a son:

- Lady Joscelyn Skye Courtenay
- Jack Haydon Langer Courtenay, Lord Courtenay

In her spare time, Langer raises awareness and money for the research and treatment of fibromyalgia, from which she herself suffers.

== Filmography ==
=== Film ===
Year	Title	Role	Notes
1991	The People Under the Stairs	Alice Robeson	
1991	And You Thought Your Parents Were Weird	Beth Allen	
1993	Lightning in a Bottle	Mitzi Furber	
1993	Ghost Brigade	Thomas, the drummer boy	
1993	Arcade	Laurie	Video
1996	Escape from L.A.	Utopia	
1998	Meet the Deedles	Lt. Jesse Ryan	
2001	On Edge	J.C. Cain	

=== Television ===
Year	Title	Role	Notes
1990	Dragnet	Martha Gibson	Episode: "Pretty Girl"
1991	Parker Lewis Can't Lose	Melissa	Episode: "Jerry's First Date"
1991, 1994	Baywatch	Caroline Larkin, Rachel / Nancy / Linda	Episodes: "The Trophy: Parts 1 & 2", "Guys & Dolls"
1991–1992	Drexell's Class	Melissa Drexell	Main role
1992	Blossom	Sherry, Sheila	Episodes: "Wake Up Little Suzy", "All Hallows Eve"
1992	Camp Wilder	Lydia	Episode: "Boy Loses Girl"
1992	Hangin' with Mr. Cooper	Darlene	Episode: "Cheers"
1992	In the Heat of the Night	Megan Fowler	Episode: "A Frenzied Affair", "Discovery"
1992	Sega Star Kids Challenge @ Universal Studios Hollywood/Florida	Herself	Played for United Cerebral Palsy
1993	The Wonder Years	Mary Jo Genaro	Episode: "Eclipse"
1993	Beverly Hills, 90210	Denise	Episode: "Radar Love"
1993	Return to Zork	Rebecca Snoot	Video game
1994–1995	My So-Called Life	Rayanne Graff	Main role
1995	CBS Schoolbreak Special	Carla Leone Lead	Episode: "Between Mother and Daughter"
1995	Diagnosis: Murder	Ashley York	Episode: "An Innocent Murder"
1995–1996	Coach	Julie Recurring role	Episodes: "She's Having Our Baby: Part 2", "Her Boyfriend's Back", "Somebody's Baby"
1996	Seinfeld	Abby	Episode: "The Fatigues"
1997	Touched by an Angel	Olivia Marland	Episode: "Labor of Love"
1997	Johnny Bravo	Mary (voice)	1 episode
1997–1998	Brooklyn South	Kathleen Doyle	Recurring role
1998	Fame L.A.	Emily Callaghan	Episode: "Duet"
1998	Poltergeist: The Legacy	Elissa	Episode: "Fallen Angel"
1999–2001	It's Like, You Know...	Lauren Woods	Series Regular
2001–2002	Three Sisters	Annie Bernstein-Flynn	Series Regular
2002	The Drew Carey Show	Dawn	2 episodes
2003	Platonically Incorrect	Darlene O'Dair Main role	TV film
2005–2007	Eyes	Meg Bardo	Series Regular
2011–2012	Private Practice	Erica Warner	Recurring role (season 5)
2013	Kristin's Christmas Past	Debbie	TV film
2017	Mary Berry's Country House Secrets	Herself	Episode: "Powderham Castle"

=== Video games ===
Year	Title	Role	Notes
1993	Return to Zork	Rebecca Snoot	
