= 12 Miles of Bad Road =

Unaired television series

- Genre: Comedy
- Created by: Linda Bloodworth-Thomason
- Starring: Lily Tomlin; Mary Kay Place; Leslie Jordan; Gary Cole; Katherine LaNasa
- Country of origin: United States
- Original language: English
- No. of episodes: 6

Original release
- Network: HBO
- Release: 2008 – 2008

12 Miles of Bad Road is a television show originally created for HBO centered on a Texas matriarch who must reconcile her booming real estate business and immense wealth with the day-to-day struggles of her dysfunctional family life.

== Cast ==
- Lily Tomlin as Amelia Shakespeare
- Mary Kay Place as C.Z. Shakespeare
- Leslie Jordan as Kenny Kingman
- Gary Cole as Jerry Shakespeare
- Katherine LaNasa as Juliet Shakespeare
- Eliza Coupe as Gaylor Shakespeare
- David Andrews as Saxby Hall
- Kim Dickens as Jonelle Shakespeare
- Cameron Richardson as McKenna Hall
- Ivana Miličević as Montserrat
- Sean Bridgers as Lyle Hartsong
- Leigh Allyn Baker as Marilyn Hartsong
- Tara Karsian as Deputy Deborah Falcon
- Ron White as Spain Dollarhyde

== Production ==
12 Miles of Bad Road was created by writer Linda Bloodworth-Thomason, creator of the television hits Designing Women, Hearts Afire, and Evening Shade. It was produced by Bloodworth-Thomason and Harry Thomason's Mozark Productions, as well as HBO. The pilot was shot in 2007. Set in Dallas, but shot in Los Angeles, the characters live in the wealthy north Dallas neighborhood of Preston Hollow.

Ten episodes of the series were ordered by HBO, but because of the 2007–2008 Writers Guild of America strike, only six episodes were shot. On March 17, 2008, HBO announced that it was not planning to air the show and the creators were shopping the episodes around to other networks.

The title is a lyric from the song "Crush with Eyeliner" from the 1995 R.E.M. album Monster, which was itself a reference to the hit song "Forty Miles of Bad Road" by Duane Eddy.

== Critical reception ==
Newsweek called it "a scabrously funny satire of real-estate magnates in Dubya's Texas".

The Los Angeles Times reported that after HBO passed on the show, "despite its price and pedigree" of prestigious actors and producers, the critics got a look:

Sent out to critics by its creators, who hoped to prove that HBO was making a grave mistake, 12 Miles is a nightmare tug of war between the bold, the brilliant and the really, truly terrible. The tale of a Texas real estate dynasty, it cries out not for a review but a psychiatric diagnosis -- schizophrenia? Bipolar disorder? Never have so many Emmy-deserving performances been trapped in such a muddled mess of a more than occasionally offensive storyline.

From the June 2008 issue of Texas Monthly:

Critics be damned, 12 Miles of Bad Road is a blast, a hair-spray-spritzed, bourbon-soaked mash-up of Dallas, Desperate Housewives, and MTV's Cribs...12 Miles is post-camp, a knowingly sincere (or sincerely knowing) attempt to resuscitate a genre that was long ago drowned out by our über-ironic culture...it qualifies as the most underrated show of the decade that almost no one has had the chance to see.

On the producers' decision to send the un-aired episodes to critics, the Toronto Star wrote:

A risky proposition, depending on prevailing opinion, with one thin-skinned critic having already weighed in, objecting to the show's somewhat cynical characters and tone. I beg to differ. The show is beyond hilarious, cleverly written and flawlessly cast.

== Episodes ==
1. - "Pilot"
2. - "The Dirty White Girl"
3. - "Tremors"
4. - "Collateral Verbiage"
5. - "Texas Stadium"
6. - "Moon-shadow"
