= The Campaign (film) =

2012 American political black comedy film by Jay Roach

- Theatrical release poster
- Directed by: Jay Roach
- Screenplay by: Chris Henchy; Shawn Harwell
- Story by: Adam McKay; Chris Henchy; Shawn Harwell
- Produced by: Jay Roach; Adam McKay; Will Ferrell; Zach Galifianakis
- Starring: Will Ferrell; Zach Galifianakis; Jason Sudeikis; Katherine LaNasa; Dylan McDermott; John Lithgow; Dan Aykroyd; Brian Cox
- Cinematography: Jim Denault
- Edited by: Craig Alpert; Jon Poll
- Music by: Theodore Shapiro
- Production companies: Gary Sanchez Productions; Everyman Pictures
- Distributed by: Warner Bros. Pictures
- Release dates: August 4, 2012 (TCFF); August 10, 2012 (United States)
- Running time: 85 minutes
- Country: United States
- Language: English
- Budget: $95 million
- Box office: $104.9 million

The Campaign is a 2012 American political satire comedy film directed by Jay Roach, written by Shawn Harwell and Chris Henchy and stars Will Ferrell and Zach Galifianakis as two North Carolinians vying for a seat in Congress.

The film was released on August 10, 2012, by Warner Bros. Pictures, to mixed reviews from critics.

== Plot ==
Democratic Congressman Cam Brady, who has run unopposed for the 14th district of North Carolina for four elections, is exposed when he has an affair with a supporter that is heard on a phone call, damaging his upcoming campaign for a fifth term. With eight weeks to go before the election, corrupt businessmen Glenn and Wade Motch persuade tour guide Marty Huggins to run against Cam as a Republican nominee. The Motch brothers ultimately intend to use Marty to forward a profitable scheme with a Chinese company.

After Cam humiliates Marty at a brunch event, campaign manager Tim Wattley (also on the payroll of the Motch brothers) transforms Marty's image into that of a successful entrepreneur and family man. This pays off during his first debate with Cam as he takes the viewers by storm with his resolve to bring back jobs to North Carolina. Marty is able to undermine Cam's campaign by challenging him to recite the Lord's Prayer (the correct wording of which eludes Cam) and by using Rainbowland, a story written by Cam as a child, to accuse him of being a Communist; the latter results in a fight breaking out at a town hall debate between Cam, Marty and their respective supporters.

Cam further damages his campaign when he accidentally punches a baby and Uggie the canine actor, on both occasions having intended to hit Marty. In response, Cam runs two campaign ads, one portraying Marty as an Al Qaeda terrorist (based on Marty's facial hair) and the other leaning into Cam's affair (despite it being received extremely negatively by women). However, Cam's popularity recovers after a mishap at a snake handling ceremony, which results in his hospitalization.

Cam later realizes his son intends to use his campaign methods against his opponent for class president, and realizes he is setting a bad example. Cam travels to Marty's home to make peace but ends up getting drunk and is arrested for drunk driving when Marty, encouraged by Tim, reports him. Marty then airs another television advertisement, with Cam's son addressing him as "dad".

Furious, Cam seduces Marty's wife, Mitzi, and records them having sex before releasing it as a campaign ad. This leads his campaign manager Mitch Wilson to resign on principle and prompts his wife to leave him and take their children with her, leaving Cam despondent about the coming election. Marty leaves Mitzi as a result of the ad but gets revenge on Cam by shooting him during a hunting trip, causing his popularity to increase further.

Marty meets with the Motch brothers soon afterwards, but learns of their "insourcing" plans with China; they intend to establish a factory complex within the 14th district and import Chinese workers to reduce shipping costs. Marty, realizing he has been used, rejects their support. The Motch brothers in turn defect to Cam's side, revitalizing his campaign and paying his wife to appear alongside him at campaign events to give the impression of reconciliation.

Meanwhile, Marty reconciles with his wife and family and desperately appeals to the voters by promising to be completely honest (to that end, revealing several embarrassing secrets about himself) and to not accept contributions from billionaires. On election day, however, Cam wins due to the voting machines being rigged by the Motch brothers.

Cam gloats about his victory to Marty, who tells him that he had been inspired by Cam's campaign for class president at their school for his pledge to remove a dangerous slide that had scarred them both. Realizing the error of his ways, Cam denounces his win and his record as a congressman, and withdraws, with Marty winning by default. Marty and Cam become friends, with Cam being appointed Marty's chief of staff.

Six months later, the Motch brothers are called to appear before Congress after being exposed by Marty and Cam. The brothers point out that everything they have done is legal under Citizens United v. FEC but are arrested due to their association with Wattley, who is in fact an international fugitive.

== Cast ==
- Will Ferrell as Representative Camden "Cam" Brady
- Zach Galifianakis as Martin Sylvester "Marty" Huggins
- Jason Sudeikis as Mitch Wilson
- Katherine LaNasa as Rose Brady, Cam's wife
- Dylan McDermott as Tim Wattley
- John Lithgow as Glenn Motch
- Dan Aykroyd as Wade Motch
- Brian Cox as Raymond Huggins, Marty's father
- Josh Lawson as Tripp Huggins, Marty's brother
- Thomas Middleditch as Travis
- Sarah Baker as Mitzi Huggins, Marty's wife
- Randall Cunningham as Cam Brady Jr., Cam & Rose's son
- Madison Wolfe as Jessica Brady, Cam & Rose's daughter
- Grant Goodman as Clay Huggins, Marty & Mitzi's son
- Kya Haywood as Dylan Huggins, Marty & Mitzi's son
- Scott A Martin as Wes
- Billy Slaughter as Dermot
- Taryn Terrell as Janette
- Karen Maruyama as Mrs. Yao
- P. J. Byrne as Rick
- Steve Tom as Representative Ben Langley
- John Goodman as Representative Scott Talley (Uncredited)

WWE wrestler The Miz makes a cameo appearance as himself.

== Production ==
Principal photography for the film, originally titled Dog Fight, began November 14, 2011, and continued through February 2012 in New Orleans, Hammond, and on the West Bank.

The film opens with a quote from Texas businessman Ross Perot, stating he was a 1988 presidential candidate. Perot didn't run for president until 1992 and 1996.

=== Music ===
The film's score was composed by Theodore Shapiro.

The Green Day song "99 Revolutions", from the album ¡Tré!, plays over the end credits.

Musical interludes and "Takin' Care of Business" performed by a group of musicians consisting of members from the Pride of The Plains Marching Band (Pittsburg State University) and local residents of Pittsburg, Kansas under the direction of Dr. Doug Whitten.

== Themes ==
The film lampoons modern American elections and the influence of corporate money. It directly satirizes the Koch brothers with another pair of ultra-wealthy siblings: the Motch brothers. The film also alluded to the New Labour, New Danger campaign of the Conservative Party during the 1997 United Kingdom general election. Ferrell's Cam Brady character has been widely characterized as a parody of former North Carolina Democratic Senator and 2004 vice-presidential nominee John Edwards.

== Release ==
The Campaign was released by Warner Bros. Pictures on August 10, 2012. The film was released on Blu-ray and DVD on October 30, 2012, by Warner Home Video.

== Reception ==
=== Box office ===
Despite performing better than expected on its opening day by grossing $10.3 million, and grossing $26.6 million in its opening weekend, finishing second at the box office behind The Bourne Legacy ($38.1 million), The Campaign was a financial disappointment, grossing $86.9 million in the U.S. and Canada and $18 million in other territories, for a total gross of $104.9 million against a $95 million budget.

=== Critical response ===
On Rotten Tomatoes, the film holds an approval rating of 66% based on 204 reviews, with an average rating of 5.94/10. The site's critical consensus states: "Its crude brand of political satire isn't quite as smart or sharp as one might hope in an election year, but The Campaign manages to generate a sufficient number of laughs thanks to its well-matched leads." Metacritic gives the film a weighted average score of 50 out of 100, based on 35 critics, indicating "mixed or average reviews". Audiences polled by CinemaScore gave the film an average grade of "B−" on an A+ to F scale.

Richard Roeper of the Chicago Sun-Times gave the film an A− and described it as "one of the best comedies of the year" where "the material is offensively funny, but the laughs are very consistent".
