= Pepys (disambiguation) =

Pepys usually refers to Samuel Pepys (1633–1703), English naval administrator, Member of Parliament, and diarist.

Pepys may also refer to:

== People ==
- Talbot Pepys (1583–1666), English politician who sat in the House of Commons in 1625
- Richard Pepys (1589–1659), English M.P. and Lord Chief Justice of Ireland, a remote cousin of the diarist
- Roger Pepys (1617–1688), English lawyer and politician
- Elisabeth Pepys (1640–1669), wife of Samuel Pepys
- Sir Lucas Pepys, 1st Baronet (1742–1830), English physician
- William Haseldine Pepys (1775–1856), English scientist
- Charles Pepys, 1st Earl of Cottenham (1781–1851), British lawyer, judge, and politician
- Henry Pepys (1783–1860), Church of England Bishop of Worcester
- Emily Pepys (1833–1877), English child diarist
- Mark Pepys, 6th Earl of Cottenham (1903–1943), motor racing driver, member of the House of Lords, and MI5 officer
- Lady Rachel Pepys (1905–1992), Lady-in-Waiting to Princess Marina
- Charles Henry Pepys Harington (1910–2007), officer in the British Army
- George Christopher Cutts Pepys (1914–1974), Bishop of Buckingham from 1964 to 1974
- Mark Pepys, English Head of Medicine at the Hampstead Campus and the Royal Free Hospital

== Other uses ==
- Pepys Street, in the City of London
- Pepys Library, of Magdalene College, Cambridge
- Pepys Island, a phantom island
