= Charles Pepys, 8th Earl of Cottenham =

Kenelm Charles Everard Digby Pepys, 8th Earl of Cottenham (27 November 1948 – 20 October 2000) was an English peer, baronet, cricketer, equestrian, business man, and designer. Known until 1968 as Viscount Crowhurst, he was later known to his friends as Charlie Cottenham. He was a member of the House of Lords from 1969 until 1999.

The son of Digby Pepys, 7th Earl of Cottenham, and his wife Lady Angela Larnach-Nevill, a daughter of Guy Larnach-Nevill, 4th Marquess of Abergavenny, he was a second cousin seven times removed of the diarist Samuel Pepys and was educated at Eton College.

On 12 May 1968, aged nineteen, he succeeded his father as Earl of Cottenham, Viscount Crowhurst, of Crowhurst, Surrey, Baron Cottenham, of Cottenham, Cambridgeshire, and as a Baronet, of Wimpole Street. The family seat was then at Priory Manor, near Kington St Michael, Wiltshire. On 15 March 1975 Cottenham married Sarah Lombard-Hobson, daughter of Captain Samuel Richard Le Hunte Lombard-Hobson CVO OBE RN, of Sherrington.

Cottenham played cricket for Eton and for Northamptonshire Second XI as a fast bowler. He toured the West Indies in 1970 with the Duke of Norfolk's XI. He was a three day eventer, competing at Badminton and Burghley Horse Trials, and representing Great Britain overseas. He gave up competing after his wife had a bad fall. In 1984, after retiring from eventing, Cottenham lent his yard at Priory Manor to his friend Mark Todd, who brought with him his horse Charisma. They won an Olympic gold medal at the 1984 Summer Olympics.

Cottenham ran a successful chain of English-language schools.

He and his wife had three children:

- Lady Georgina Marye Pepys (born 1981)
- Mark John Henry Pepys, 9th Earl of Cottenham (born 1983), m. Juan Du, of Kunming, China
  - Charlie Thomas Pepys, Viscount Crowhurst (born 2020)
- Hon. Sam Richard Pepys (born 1986)

In 2007, Cottenham's widow married Richard George Ford, a kinsman of Viscount Hampden.

Peerage of the United Kingdom
Preceded by John Digby Thomas Pepys	Earl of Cottenham; 1968–2000	Succeeded by Mark John Henry Pepys
Preceded by John Digby Thomas Pepys	Baron Cottenham; 1968–2000	Succeeded by Mark John Henry Pepys
Baronetage of Great Britain
Preceded by John Digby Thomas Pepys	Baronet (of Brook Street); 1968–2000	Succeeded by Mark John Henry Pepys
Baronetage of the United Kingdom
Preceded by John Digby Thomas Pepys	Baronet (of Wimpole Street); 1968–2000	Succeeded by Mark John Henry Pepys
