= Charles Courtenay, 17th Earl of Devon =

British peer (1916–1998)

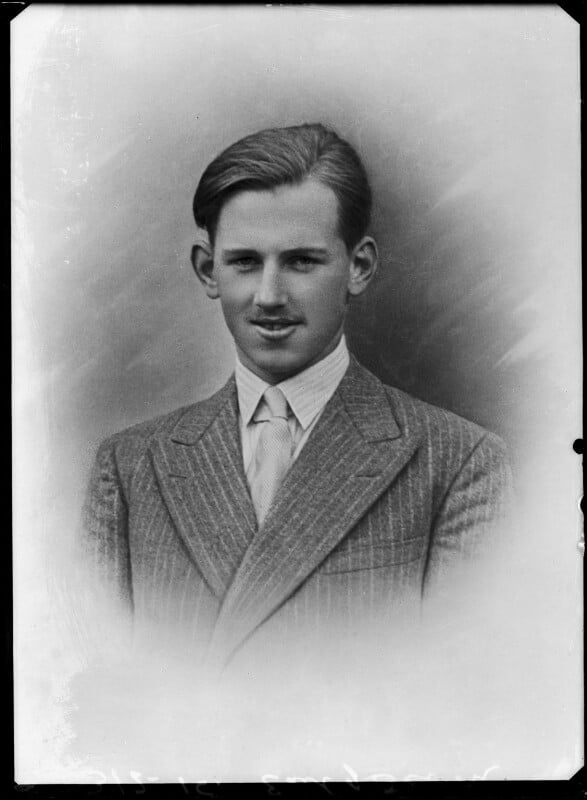
Devon in 1936

Charles Christopher Courtenay, 17th Earl of Devon (18 July 1916 – 19 November 1998) was a British soldier, landowner, and peer, a member of the House of Lords from 1937 until his death.

The second son of Frederick Leslie Courtenay, 16th Earl of Devon, and his wife Marguerite Silva, he was educated at Winchester College and the Royal Military College, Sandhurst, from where he was commissioned into the Coldstream Guards.

On 19 June 1935 he succeeded as Earl of Devon and as a baronet. On 29 July 1939 he married Sybil Venetia Taylor, daughter of Captain John Vickris Taylor, recently divorced from Mark Pepys, 6th Earl of Cottenham, thus gaining two step-daughters. While on active service in the Second World War, Devon was wounded and mentioned in despatches, rising to the rank of Captain.

With his wife, Devon had two children:

- Lady Katherine Felicity Courtenay (1940–2015), who on 8 January 1966 married Antony Stephen Pope Watney; they had one son, Michael Hugh Sanders Watney
- Hugh Rupert Courtenay, 18th Earl of Devon (1942–2015)

== Notes ==
Peerage of England
Preceded by Frederick Leslie Courtenay	Earl of Devon; 1935–1998	Succeeded by Hugh Rupert Courtenay
