= Harry McGowan, 1st Baron McGowan =

British Baron and industrialist (1874–1961)

The Right Honourable The Lord McGowan KBE
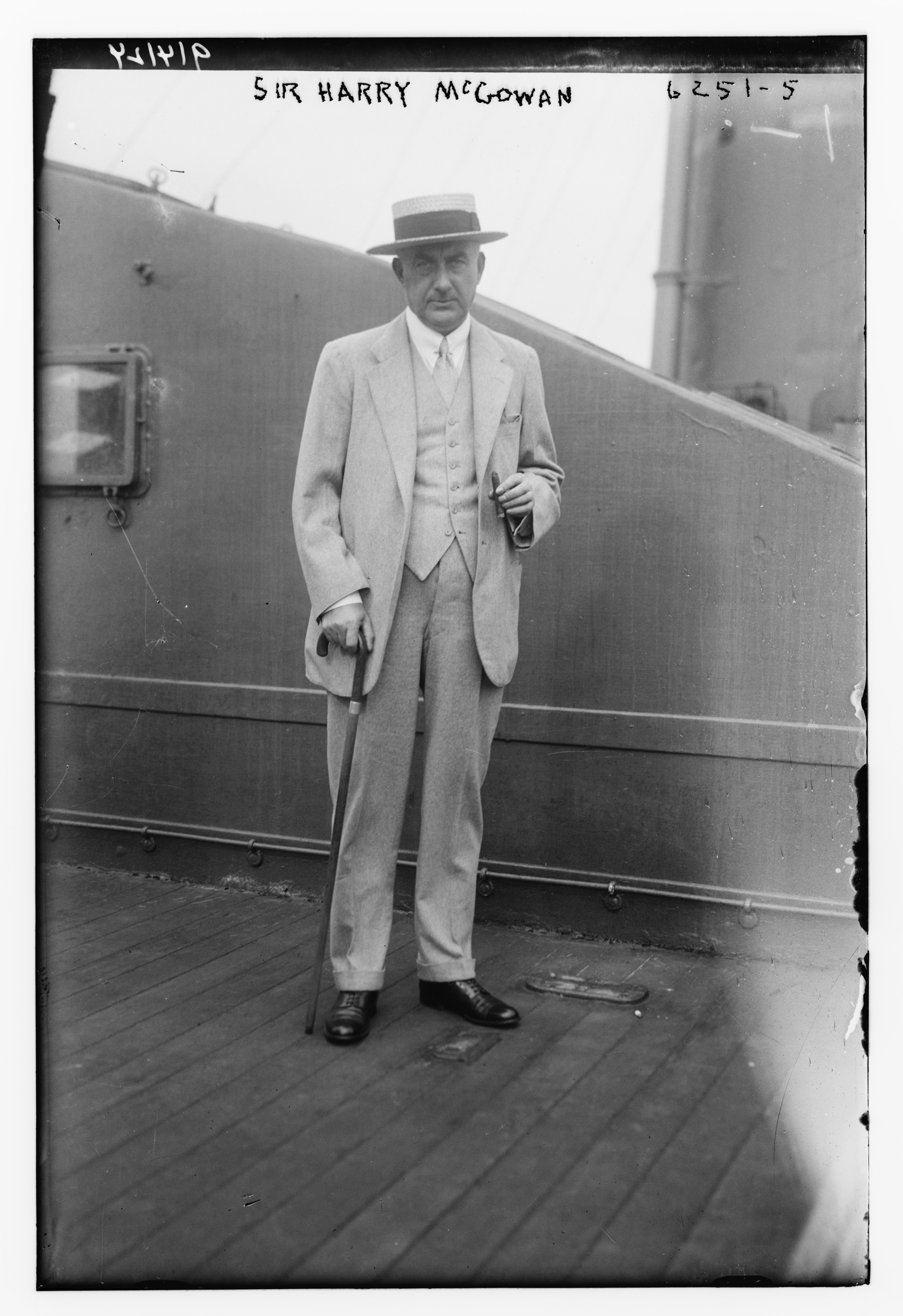

Chairman - Imperial Chemical Industries
- In office 1930–1950
- Preceded by: Alfred Mond, 1st Baron Melchett
- Succeeded by: Lord Fleck

Personal details
- Born: 3 June 1874
- Died: 13 July 1961 (aged 87) London
- Spouse: Lady Jean Boyle Young
- Children: Hon. Agnes Wilson McGowan; Hon. Isobel Young McGowan; Lord Harry Wilson McGowan, 2nd Baron McGowan; Hon. William Johnston McGowan
- Parents: Henry McGowan Esq.; Agnes Wilson
- Education: Hutchesons' Grammar School; LL.D. St. Andrews University

Harry Duncan McGowan, 1st Baron McGowan KBE (3 June 1874 – 13 July 1961) LLD DCL, was a prominent Scottish industrialist who served as Chairman of Imperial Chemical Industries for 20 years.

== Early life and education ==
McGowan was the only son of Henry McGowan Esq. and his wife Agnes (née Wilson). He was educated at Hutchesons' Grammar School, an independent school in Glasgow and Allan Glen's School. He joined the Nobel Explosives Company, the company founded by Alfred Nobel, as an executive officer. In 1918 he became Chairman and Managing Director of Explosives Trade Ltd (from 1920 known as Nobel Industries Ltd), a position he held until the formation of ICI.

== Career ==
In 1926 Nobel Industries merged with Brunner Mond, the United Alkali Company and the British Dyestuffs Corporation to form Imperial Chemical Industries (ICI). The merger, orchestrated by Alfred Mond, 1st Baron Melchett and McGowan, created one of the world's largest industrial corporations at the time.

McGowan succeeded Lord Melchett as Chairman and Managing Director in 1930 and remained Chairman until 1950. He was president of the Society of Chemical Industry in 1931. McGowan was appointed a KBE in the 1918 Birthday Honours and on 24 February 1937 he was raised to the peerage as Baron McGowan, of Ardeer in the County of Ayr, following the 1937 New Year Honours.

McGowan was a vegetarian who supported animal welfare. He served as president of League for the Prohibition of Cruel Sports and vice-president of the London Robert Louis Stevenson Club. McGowan married Jean, daughter of William Young, in 1903. They had two sons and two daughters. He was Hon. Colonel in the 52nd Lowland Divisional Signals, Royal Corps of Signals from 1934 to 1939. He died in July 1961, aged 87, and was succeeded in the barony by his elder son Harry.

== Arms ==
Coat of arms of Harry McGowan, 1st Baron McGowan
Crest A tower Or between two horseshoes Proper. Escutcheon Quarterly per saltire Argent and Azure two lions rampant in pale Gules and as many horseshoes in fess Proper Supporters Dexter a figure representing St Barbara Proper holding in the exterior hand a tower Or sinister a figure representing St Kentigern Proper holding in the exterior hand his Crozier Or. Motto Juncta Juvant (Union Is Strength)

== In literature and popular culture ==
McGowan's organisation of the purchase of General Motors shares to the value of £5 million by Explosives Trades Ltd., enabled Pierre S. du Pont's financial rescue of the American car manufacturer from bankruptcy; this episode was naively satirised by Neil Munro in his Erchie MacPherson story "Our Mystery Millionaire", first published in the Glasgow Evening News of 17 May 1920.

Peerage of the United Kingdom
New creation	Baron McGowan; 1937–1961	Succeeded by Harry McGowan
