= Mark Pepys, 6th Earl of Cottenham =

English racing driver and peer (1903–1943)

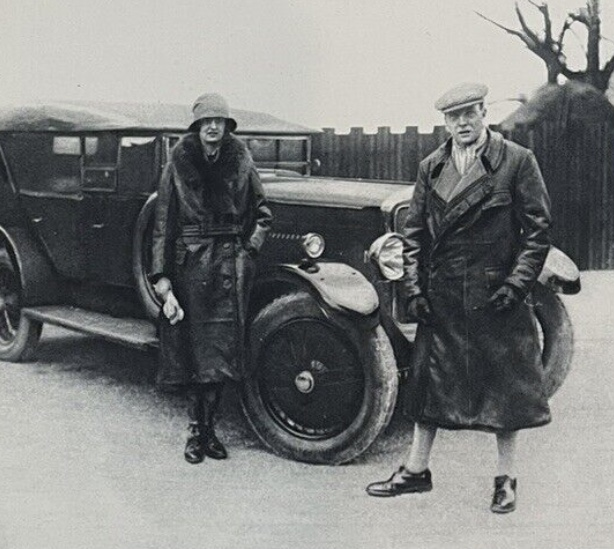
Cottenham and his wife in 1927

Mark Everard Pepys, 6th Earl of Cottenham (29 May 1903 – 19 July 1943) was an English peer, baronet, motor racing driver, member of the House of Lords, and MI5 officer.

He resigned from MI5 during the Second World War, soon after the German attack on the Soviet Union (Operation Barbarossa), as he did not support the continuation of the war against Germany.

== Early life ==
Mark Pepys was born on 29 May 1903. The second son of Kenelm Pepys, 4th Earl of Cottenham, and his wife Lady Rose Nevill, a daughter of William Nevill, 1st Marquess of Abergavenny, he was educated at Charterhouse School, then joined Vickers and University College London, where he studied engineering. His father was a distant cousin of the diarist Samuel Pepys.

== Career ==
In 1922, Mark Pepys succeeded an older brother as Earl of Cottenham, Viscount Crowhurst, of Crowhurst, Surrey, Baron Cottenham, of Cottenham, Cambridgeshire, and as a Baronet, of Wimpole Street. He was a member of the House of Lords from 1924 until his death in 1943 and spoke in the Lords on roads matters. As a racing driver, in 1925 and 1926 he raced at Brooklands driving an Austin 7 and a works Alvis. In 1926, he bought a car built for the late Louis Zborowski capable of 90 miles per hour, and was reserve driver for his friend Henry Segrave in the first ever British Grand Prix. It was reported that he always took his valet with him to races, to make sure he was well turned out. He later founded a motoring association called the Order of the Road, which promoted safe driving.

Cottenham served as an officer in the Leicestershire Yeomanry and was promoted to the rank of lieutenant on 25 April 1926. He resigned his commission on 4 May 1927.

In 1932, Cottenham wrote a series of articles for The Daily Express in which he declared his belief in spiritualism and stated that he was himself a medium. He had been introduced to the subject by the mother of the late Henry Segrave and by Estelle Roberts.

In the 1930s, Cottenham devised a system of car control for the Metropolitan Police which included checking "are you driving: in the right place, at the right speed, in the right gear, anticipating hazards, frequently checking the mirror?" In 2007, the Driving Instructors' Association continued to endorse this in its manual Roadcraft.

In 1939, Cottenham returned to the Leicestershire Yeomanry. By the beginning of the Second World War, he had been put in charge of MI5's Transport Section. However, in 1941, after Churchill had come to power, and after the Germans had launched Operation Barbarossa, he resigned from MI5 and went to live in the United States, as he no longer supported the war with Germany. Although sometimes claimed to have died in the United States in 1943, in fact he returned to England for medical treatment.

Cottenham died on 19 July 1943, at 9, Mandeville Place, Westminster, a fashionable nursing home, while living at the Travellers Club. He left an estate valued at £1,969. His executors were his younger brother John Digby Pepys and Reginald Pound. Cottenham was succeeded in his peerages by his younger brother, Digby Pepys.

== Personal life ==
On 19 January 1927, at St Margaret's, Westminster, Cottenham married Sybil Venetia Taylor, a daughter of Captain John Vickris Taylor, and in August 1927 they were living at Hill House, Fritwell, near Bicester. They had two daughters:

- Lady Rose Edith Idina Pepys (1927–2021)
- Lady Paulina Mary Louise Pepys (1930–2017)

In 1939, Cottenham and his wife were divorced, and on 29 July of that year she married Charles Courtenay, 17th Earl of Devon. Devon was a cousin of Cottenham's, as his grandmother Lady Evelyn Pepys (1839–1910) was a daughter of the first Earl of Cottenham.

In February 1939, to her great excitement, Cottenham invited Anna Wolkoff to go out to dinner with him, but nothing came of it. On 10 April 1939, Klop Ustinov reported to MI5 that Anna was a "staunch Nazi propagandist". A year later, she went to prison for offences under the Official Secrets Act and wrote to Cottenham from prison, but he did not reply.

== Publications ==
Cottenham's novel All Out (1932), dedicated to the widow of his old racing companion Henry Segrave, tells the story of a group of motoring friends fighting a gang of international criminals and includes a dramatic racing crash which was drawn from experience.

Motoring To-day and To-morrow (1928) is dedicated to Reginald Pound, with a note from Cottenham to say that "in motoring, as in other things, we cherish similar ideals, dislike the same tendencies".

- Motoring Without Fears (London: Methuen & Co., 1928)
- Motoring To-day & To-morrow, with a Preface by John Buchan, illustrated by A. E. Horne (London: Methuen & Co., 1928)
- Steering-Wheel Papers (London: Cassell, 1932)
- All Out: the story of Tom Furness's adventure (London: Cassell, 1932, novel)
- Sicilian Circuit: being some further adventures of Mr. Thomas Furness and his friends (London: Cassell, 1933, novel) OCLC 810762147
- Mine Host, America (London: Collins, 1937)

Peerage of the United Kingdom
Preceded by Kenelm Charles Francis Pepys	Earl of Cottenham; 1922–1943	Succeeded by John Digby Thomas Pepys
Preceded by Kenelm Charles Francis Pepys	Baron Cottenham; 1922–1943	Succeeded by John Digby Thomas Pepys
Baronetage of Great Britain
Preceded by Kenelm Charles Francis Pepys	Baronet (of Brook Street); 1922–1943	Succeeded by John Digby Thomas Pepys
Baronetage of the United Kingdom
Preceded by Kenelm Charles Francis Pepys	Baronet (of Wimpole Street); 1922–1943	Succeeded by John Digby Thomas Pepys
