= Charles Courtenay, 19th Earl of Devon =

English hereditary peer and barrister (born 1975)

The Right Honourable The Earl of Devon
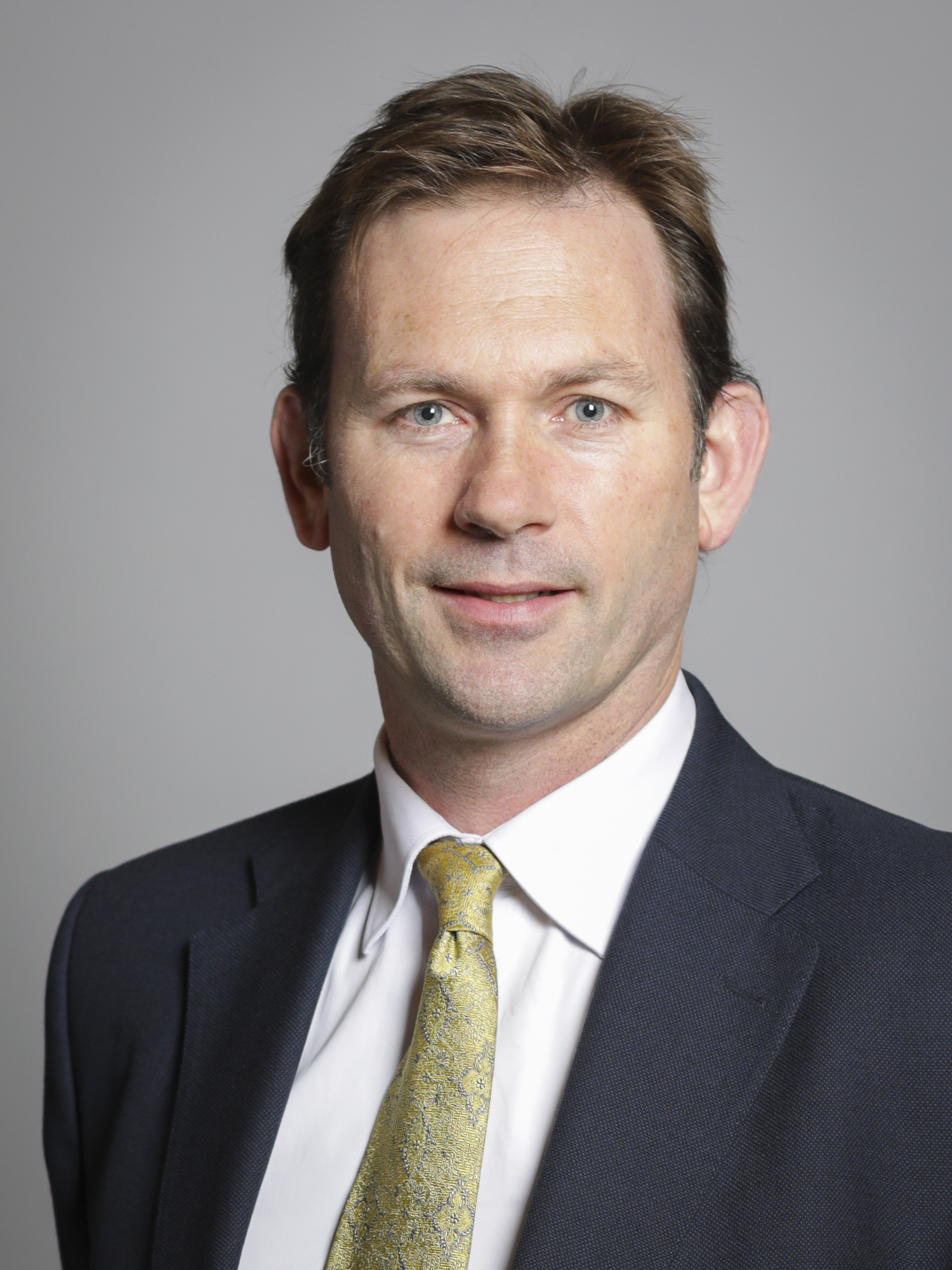
- Official portrait, 2019

Member of the House of Lords
- Lord Temporal
- Elected Hereditary Peer; 12 July 2018 – 29 April 2026
- By-election: 2018
- Preceded by: The 4th Earl Baldwin of Bewdley
- Succeeded by: Seat abolished

Personal details
- Born: Charles Peregrine Courtenay; 14 August 1975 (age 51) Exeter, Devon, England
- Party: None (Crossbencher)
- Spouse: A. J. Langer (m. 2004; div. 2026) Jemmima Hannon (m. 2026)
- Children: 2
- Parent(s): Hugh Courtenay, 18th Earl of Devon; Diana Watherston
- Education: Eton College
- Alma mater: St John's College, Cambridge
- Occupation: Barrister

Charles Peregrine Courtenay, 19th Earl of Devon (born 14 August 1975), styled as Lord Courtenay from 1998 until 2015, is an English hereditary peer and barrister. He was a crossbench member of the House of Lords, having been elected at a by-election in 2018.

== Education and career ==
Courtenay was educated at Eton College. After obtaining an MA degree from St John's College, Cambridge, in 1997, he followed his legal studies at the Inns of Court School of Law. Courtenay was admitted to the bar at Inner Temple in 1999, and to the California State Bar in 2004.

Devon practised law with the firm of Latham & Watkins from 2005 to 2018, starting at their Los Angeles, California office. In January 2014, he permanently relocated his family to London and transferred to his firm's London office. In January 2019, he joined the Exeter firm Michelmores as a partner, where he is known as Charles Courtenay. He and his family now reside at the family's ancestral home of Powderham Castle in Devon, England. He owns a 3,500-acre estate.

In 2025, Devon called for the House of Lords to abolish the use of the word "Lord" to describe its peers, calling the chamber itself "gendered" and "discriminatory." He lost his position with the abolition of hereditary membership.

In 2026, Devon criticized primogeniture and the order of succession for hereditary peerages, saying that they are "unfair" and "inappropriate", and advocated for equal opportunities for both male and female descendants of peers.

== Personal life ==
Courtenay married the American actress A. J. Langer in a civil ceremony in 2004. A formal wedding later took place on 30 April 2005, in Los Angeles. With his father's death in 2015, the then Lord Courtenay succeeded to his father's peerage and estate, becoming the 19th Earl of Devon.

Devon and Langer have two children. Devon announced that he had filed for divorce in November 2023. In February 2024, Devon filed to dismiss the couple's divorce application “without prejudice” and remains separated from Langer. They later divorced.

In March 2026 Devon announced his engagement to Jemima Hannon, the granddaughter of Alan Campbell, Baron Campbell of Alloway. The couple married in summer of 2026.

== Arms ==
Coat of arms of Courtenay, Earls of Devon
Crest 1st, Out of a ducal coronet or, a plume of seven ostrich feathers four and three argent; 2nd, a dolphin embowed proper Escutcheon Quarterly 1st and 4th Or, three torteaux (Courtenay); 2nd and 3rd Or, a lion rampant azure (Redvers, Earls of Devon) Supporters Two boars argent, bristled, tusked, and unguled or Motto Quod Verum Tutum (What is true is safe)

== Ancestry ==
Ancestors of Charles Courtenay, 19th Earl of Devon

16. Henry Courtenay, Lord Courtenay (1836–1898)
8. Frederick Courtenay, 16th Earl of Devon (1875–1935)
17. Lady Evelyn Pepys (1839–1910), daughter of Charles Pepys, 1st Earl of Cottenham
4. Charles Courtenay, 17th Earl of Devon (1916–1998)
18. John Silva (1839–1923)
9. Marguerite Silva (1875–1950)
19. Mary Frances Corrie (1845–1929)
2. Hugh Courtenay, 18th Earl of Devon
10. Capt. John Vikris Taylor (1872–1956)
5. Sybil Venetia Taylor (d. 2001)
22. George Hopkinson (d. 1919)
11. Sybil Mary Hopkinson
23. Blanche Isabella Somerset (1847–1922); great-granddaughter of Henry Somerset, 5th Duke of Beaufort
1. Charles Courtenay, 19th Earl of Devon
6. Jack Greenshields Watherston
3. Diana Frances Watherston
7. Elizabeth Jean Eildon McConnel

Peerage of England
Preceded by Hugh Courtenay	Earl of Devon; 2015–present	Incumbent
Parliament of the United Kingdom
Preceded by The Earl Baldwin of Bewdley	Elected hereditary peer to the House of Lords under the House of Lords Act 1999; 2018–2026	Position abolished under the House of Lords (Hereditary Peers) Act 2026
