= Earl of Cottenham =

Earldom in the Peerage of the United Kingdom

Earldom of Cottenham
- Sable, on a Bend Or, between two Nag's Heads erased Argent, three Fleurs-de-lis Sable.
- Creation date: 11 June 1850
- Created by: Queen Victoria
- Peerage: Peerage of the United Kingdom
- First holder: Charles Pepys, 1st Earl of Cottenham
- Present holder: Mark Pepys, 9th Earl of Cottenham
- Heir apparent: Charlie Pepys, Viscount Crowhurst
- Remainder to: the 1st Earl's heirs male of the body legally begotten
- Subsidiary titles: Viscount Crowhurst; Baron Cottenham
- Motto: Mens Cujusque is est quisque ("Each man's character is his true self")

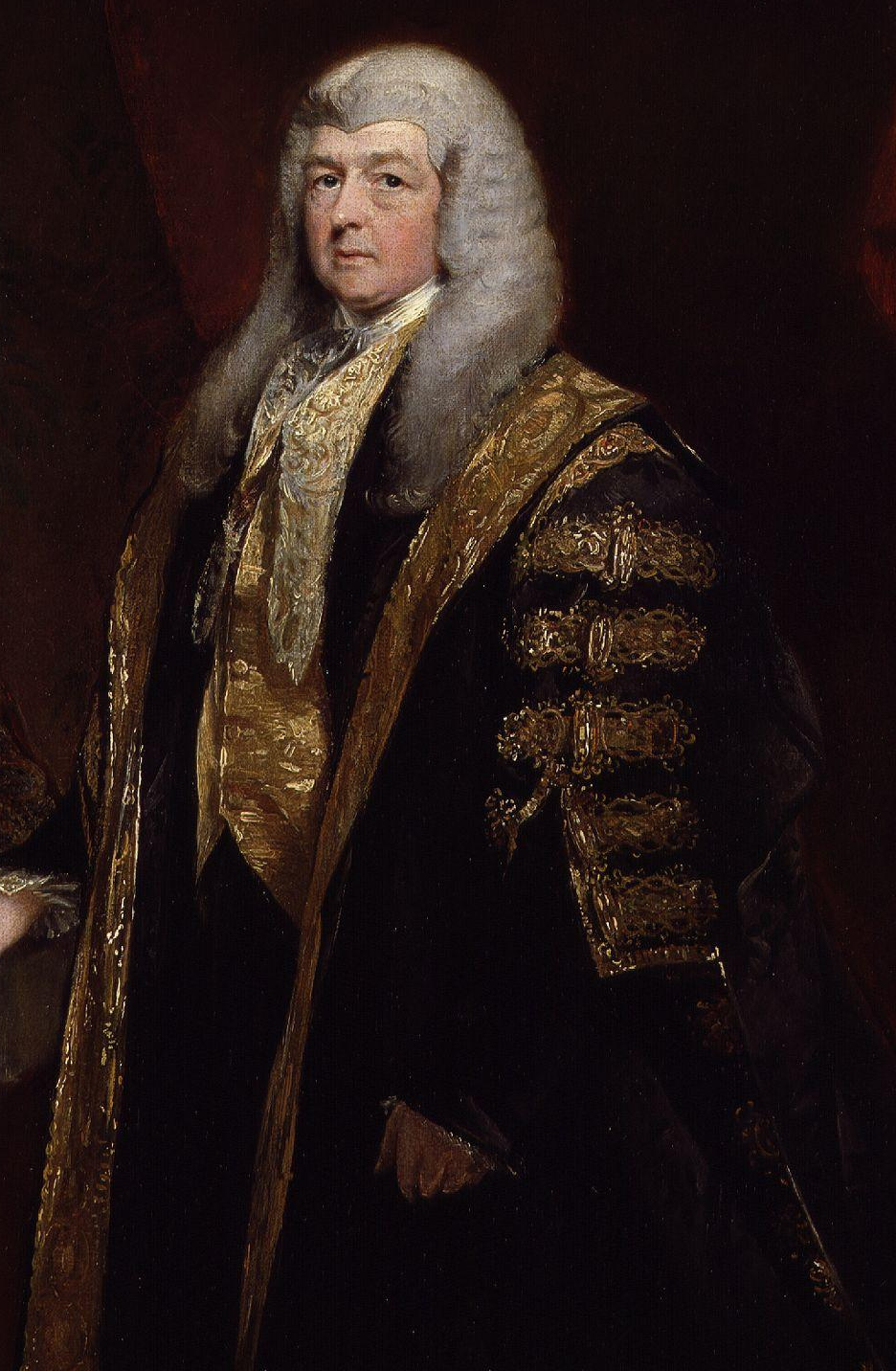
Charles Christopher Pepys, 1st Earl of Cottenham

Earl of Cottenham (/ˈkɒtənəm/), of Cottenham in the County of Cambridge, is a title in the Peerage of the United Kingdom. It was created in 1850 for the prominent lawyer and Whig politician Charles Pepys, 1st Baron Cottenham. /ˈpɛpɪs/) (Note: Pronounced "peppis", not "peeps" in this branch of the family. Gillian Avery: Introduction. In: The Journal of Emily Pepys (London: Prospect Books, 1984. ISBN 0-907325-24-6), p. 11.) He served as Lord Chancellor from 1836 to 1841 and from 1846 to 1850. Pepys had already been created Baron Cottenham, of Cottenham in the County of Cambridge, in 1836, and was made Viscount Crowhurst, of Crowhurst in the County of Surrey, at the same time he was given the earldom. These titles are also in the Peerage of the United Kingdom. The viscountcy is used as a courtesy title for the Earl's eldest son and heir apparent.

In 1845 Lord Cottenham succeeded his elder brother as third Baronet, of Wimpole Street, and in 1849 he also succeeded his cousin as fourth Baronet, of Brook Street, according to a special remainder in the letters patent. The Baronetcy, of Wimpole Street, was created in the Baronetage of the United Kingdom in 1801 for Lord Cottenham's father William Pepys, a Master in Chancery. The Baronetcy, of Brook Street, was created in the Baronetage of Great Britain in 1784 for Lucas Pepys. As of 2010 the titles are held by the first Earl's great-great-great-grandson, the ninth Earl, who succeeded his father in 2000.

The title of the earldom is derived from the village of Cottenham in Cambridgeshire, birthplace of John Pepys, ancestor of the first Earl, and great-uncle of Samuel Pepys the diarist. Another member of the Pepys family was Henry Pepys, third son of Sir William Pepys, 1st Baronet, and younger brother of the first Earl. He was Bishop of Worcester from 1841 to 1860.

The family seat is Priory Manor, near Kington St Michael, Wiltshire.

== Pepys baronets, of Wimpole Street (1801) ==
- Sir William Pepys, 1st Baronet (1740–1825), created baronet 23 June 1801.
- Sir William Weller Pepys, 2nd Baronet (1778–1845)
- Sir Charles Pepys, 3rd Baronet (1781–1851) (created Baron Cottenham in 1836 and Earl of Cottenham in 1850)

== Earls of Cottenham (1850) ==
- Charles Christopher Pepys, 1st Earl of Cottenham (1781–1851)
- Charles Edward Pepys, 2nd Earl of Cottenham (1824–1863)
- William John Pepys, 3rd Earl of Cottenham (1825–1881)
- Kenelm Charles Edward Pepys, 4th Earl of Cottenham (1874–1919)
- Kenelm Charles Francis Pepys, 5th Earl of Cottenham (1901–1922)
- Mark Everard Pepys, 6th Earl of Cottenham (1903–1943), a racing driver
- John Digby Thomas Pepys, 7th Earl of Cottenham (1907–1968)
- Kenelm Charles Everard Digby Pepys, 8th Earl of Cottenham (1948–2000), a cricketer
- Mark John Henry Pepys, 9th Earl of Cottenham (b. 1983)

== Present peer ==
Mark John Henry Pepys, 9th Earl of Cottenham (born 11 October 1983) is the elder son of the 8th Earl of Cottenham and his wife Sarah Lombard-Hobson. He was styled as Viscount Crowhurst between 1983 and 20 October 2000, when he succeeded to the peerages and baronetcies. He has an older sister, Lady Georgina Pepys (born 1981), and a younger brother, Sam Richard Pepys (born 1986).

In 2019, the fund manager Bite Investments appointed Cottenham as its Head of Operations for China.

The heir apparent is Cottenham's son Charlie Thomas Crowhurst Pepys, Viscount Crowhurst (born 2020).

== Pepys baronets, of Brook Street (1784) ==
- Sir Lucas Pepys, 1st Baronet (1742–1830)
- Sir Charles Leslie, 2nd Baronet (1774–1833)
- Sir Henry Leslie, 3rd Baronet (1783–1849)
- Charles Pepys, 1st Baron Cottenham, 4th Baronet (1781–1851)

see Earls of Cottenham for further succession

== Notes and citations ==
Citations

Notes

Baronetage of Great Britain
Preceded by Durrant baronets	Pepys baronets of Brook Street; 22 January 1784	Succeeded by Wood baronets
Baronetage of the United Kingdom
Preceded by Strachey baronets	Pepys baronets of Wimpole Street; 23 June 1801	Succeeded by Ball baronets
