= St Paul's Church, Kingsand =

Church building in Kingsand, Cornwall, England

St Paul's Church
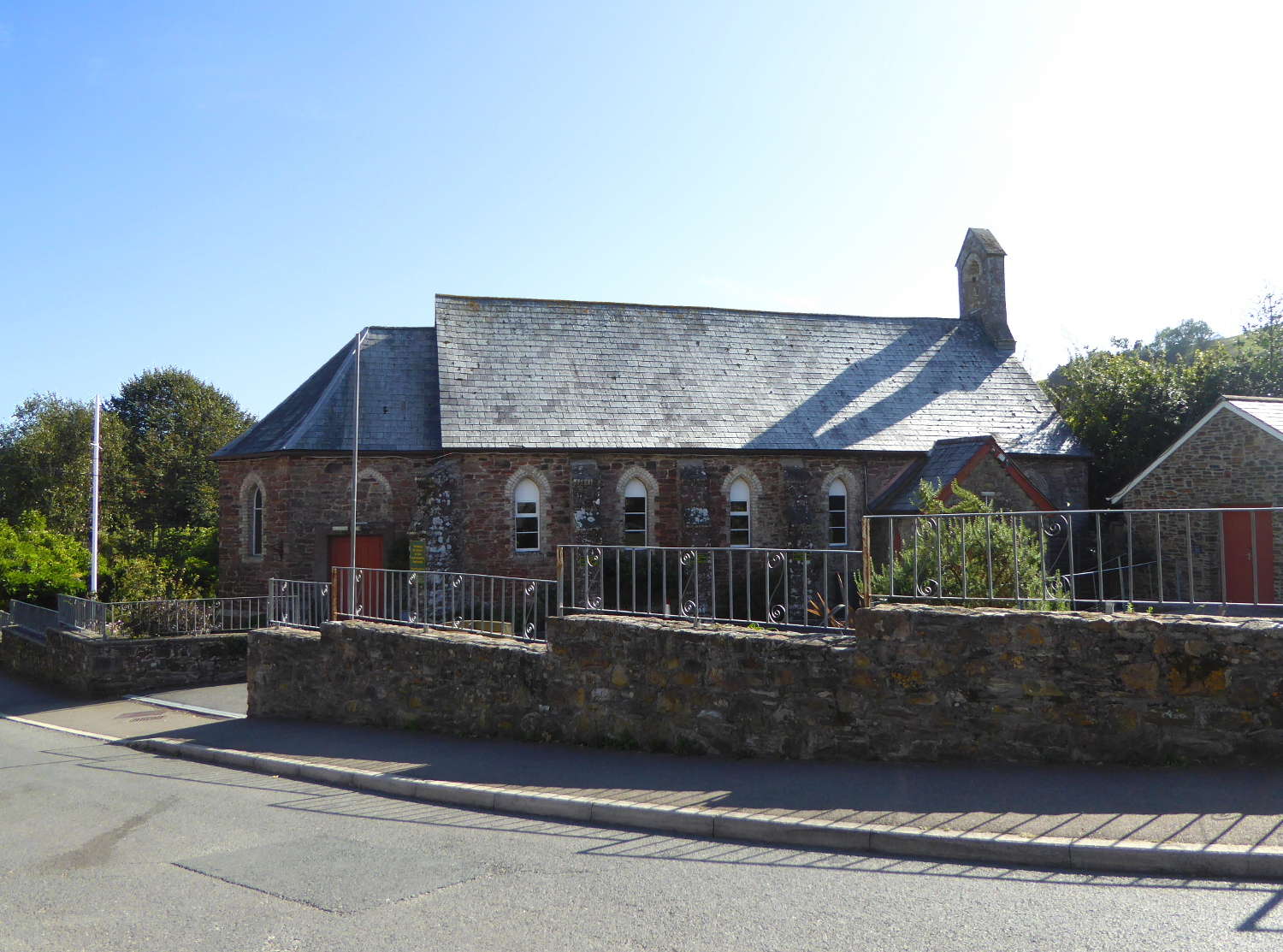

Religion
- Affiliation: Church of England
- Ecclesiastical or organizational status: Closed

Location
- Location: Kingsand, Cornwall, England
- Interactive map of St Paul's Church
- Coordinates: 50.3353°N 4.2024°W

Architecture
- Architect: George Perkins
- Type: Church
- Completed: 1882

St Paul's Church is a former Church of England church in Kingsand, Cornwall, England, UK. Built in 1881–82, the church ceased use as a place of worship after 1943 and is now used as the Maker with Rame Community Hall.

== History ==
St Paul's was built as a chapel of ease to Maker's parish church of St Mary's and St Julian's in 1881–82. With the parish church over a mile away from the village, a temporary place of worship was established in a dwelling at Kingsand in 1876. It was replaced two years later by a mission room built by Kenelm William Edward Edgcumbe, the 6th Earl of Mount Edgcumbe, however the building quickly proved too small to serve the needs of the community. In similarity to the chapel of ease of St Andrew's in neighbouring Cawsand, the plot of land and building stone for St Paul's was gifted by the Earl. The church was designed by Mr. George Perkins of Stonehouse and built by Mr. W. B. Carne of Cawsand.

St Paul's was dedicated by the Bishop of Truro, Edward White Benson, on 19 April 1882. On the day, clergy members and the choirs of Maker and Rame churches formed a procession and travelled to the new church from the mission room. The bishop preached during the morning service and Canon Mason preached in the evening. A parish hall was built next to the church in 1930, on a plot of land let by the Earl of Mount Edgcumbe for a nominal fee.

In 1943, Maker and Rame parishes were merged as a result of falling population numbers. St Paul's closed as a full-time place of worship that year but saw occasional until it became a church hall by 1952. The building was later handed over to the local community by Robert Edgcumbe, the 8th Earl of Mount Edgcumbe, in 1990. A refurbishment project followed and the Earl officially opened the hall as the Maker with Rame Community Hall on 8 October 1991. Since 1990, £150,000 has been spent on the building. A 25th anniversary celebration was held in 2016 and attended by 150 residents and the Earl.

== Architecture ==
St Paul's is built of local stone and red tiles in the Early English Gothic style. Designed to accommodate 300 persons, it was made up of nave, pentagonal chancel and north porch. The church was built with lancet windows and a turret containing one bell. Internal fittings included benches of pine wood, an oak pulpit, stone font and oak communion table. The font and its marble base was gifted by the vicar of Maker and the communion table by the church's builder, Mr. Carne.

The church's windows were filled with cathedral glass. Following its dedication, construction work was completed by the end of the year. By November, the north porch had been added, other parts of the building finished and the east end window installed with stained glass made by Messrs Fouracre and Watson of Stonehouse.
