= 5th (Prince of Wales's) Battalion, Devonshire Regiment =

Part-time unit of the British Army

5th (Prince of Wales's) Battalion, Devonshire Regiment 86th (5th Devon) Anti-Tank Regiment, Royal Artillery
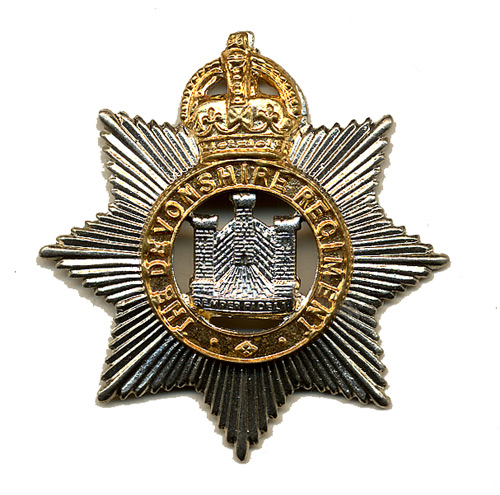
- Cap badge of the Devonshire Regiment
- Active: 7 December 1859 – 15 May 1950
- Country: United Kingdom
- Branch: Territorial Force
- Role: Infantry/Anti-Tank Artillery
- Size: 1–3 Battalions
- Part of: 43rd (Wessex) Division; XII Corps
- Garrison/HQ: Plymouth
- Engagements: Second Boer War; World War I: Palestine; Western Front; World War II: Tunisia; Italy; North West Europe

Commanders
- Notable commanders: 4th Earl of Mount Edgcumbe; 9th Lord Clifford of Chudleigh

The 5th (Prince of Wales's) Battalion, Devonshire Regiment, was a part-time unit of the British Army recruited in the county of Devon. It was formed in the Territorial Force in 1908 by amalgamating two existing Volunteer Battalions of the Devonshire Regiment. The battalion served in India and fought in Palestine and on the Western Front during World War I. In World War II it provided two anti-tank artillery units, which served in Tunisia, Italy and North West Europe. They were both merged into other Devonshire units in 1950.

== Volunteer Force ==
The enthusiasm for the Volunteer movement following an invasion scare in 1859 saw the creation of many Rifle and Mounted Rifle Volunteer Corps composed of part-time soldiers eager to supplement the Regular Army in time of need. A large number of company-sized corps were raised in Devonshire and were soon organised into larger administrative battalions. In 1880 the independent Rifle Volunteer Corps (RVCs) were consolidated into battalions, which became Volunteer Battalions (VBs) of the Devonshire Regiment under the Childers Reforms of 1881.

=== 2nd (Prince of Wales's) Volunteer Battalion ===
The 1st Administrative Battalion, Devonshire Rifle Volunteer Corps, was formed in June 1860 at Plymouth, but shortly afterwards was redesignated the 2nd Administrative Battalion, Devonshire RVCs with the following units under command: (Note: It is possible that it was renumbered to avoid confusion with the 1st (Exeter & South Devon) RVC, which constituted a full battalion; in the event a new 1st Administrative Battalion was formed at Exeter later that year to command a group of independent RVCs in East Devon.)

- 2nd (Plymouth) Devonshire RVC, raised on 7 December 1859; a second company was raised in February 1860, and a further two by 1868
- 3rd (Devonport Dockyard) Devonshire RVC, raised on 7 December 1859; a second company was raised on 1 March 1860 and a third by 1871; a Cadet Corps was formed by the corps in 1874 at Plymouth, this was disbanded in 1885
- 16th (Stonehouse) Devonshire RVC, raised on 29 February 1860 by Captain Viscount Valletort of the Duke of Cornwall's Rangers in the Militia; absorbed by 2nd RVC in 1874
- 22nd (Tavistock) Devonshire RVC, raised on 5 March 1860

Viscount Valletort was appointed Lieutenant-Colonel in command of the battalion on 8 August 1860; he succeeded as 4th Earl of Mount Edgcumbe the following year. He maintained his links with the battalion until his death in 1917. He was assisted by a number of experienced officers: in the 1860s: Lt-Col William Fisk, formerly of the 12th Foot, served as captain-commandant of the 2nd RVC and second-in-command of the admin battalion with the rank of major, while Brevet Colonel John Elliott, retired from the Royal Marines, became adjutant of the battalion in 1870. Major-General (retired) James Pickard, Royal Marines, served as lt-col commandant of the 2nd RVC and second lt-col of the battalion from 1871.

Under the 'Localisation of the Forces' scheme introduced by the Cardwell Reforms of 1872, Volunteers were grouped into county brigades with their local Regular and Militia battalions. For the Devonshire RVCs this was Brigade No 34 (County of Devon) in Western District alongside the 11th Foot, the 1st Devon Militia and the South Devon Militia as well as the other Devon RVCs. When the RVCs were consolidated in 1880, the 2nd Admin Bn adopted the title 2nd (Prince of Wales's) Devonshire RVC:

- A to F Companies at Prospect Place Drill Hall, Millbay, Plymouth, from the former 2nd RVC
- G to I Companies at Drill Hall, York Street, Devonport, from the 3rd RVC
- K and L Companies at Bedford Square, Tavistock, from the 22nd RVC

The Childers Reforms of 1881 took Cardwell's reforms further, and the Volunteers were formally affiliated to their local Regular regiment, with the 11th Foot becoming the Devonshire Regiment and the 2nd (PoW) Devonshire RVC becoming one of its Volunteer Battalions on 1 July 1881. The RVC changed its title on 1 November 1885 to 2nd (Prince of Wales's) Volunteer Battalion.

In 1894 Kelly College at Tavistock formed a cadet company affiliated to the battalion, followed by a cadet corps formed by the Postal Telegraph Messengers of Plymouth in 1906. The following year the Plymouth & Mannamead College Cadet Corps was transferred to the 2nd VB from the 2nd Devonshire Royal Garrison Artillery (Volunteers). An extra company (M) was formed in 1900, but the battalion was reduced to eight companies in 1905.

The late Victorian era saw a craze for cycling and the Volunteer Force took a leading role in developing the new Safety bicycle for military use. By 1907 the battalion had formed a Cyclist Section.

=== 5th (The Hay Tor) Volunteer Battalion ===
The 5th Administrative Battalion, Devonshire RVCs, was formed at Totnes on 24 August 1860 with the following units under command:

- 17th (Totnes) Devonshire RVC, raised on 3 March 1860
- 26th (Kingsbridge) Devonshire RVC, raised on 5 July 1860
- 4th (Modbury) Devonshire Mounted Rifle Volunteers (MRV), raised on 20 April 1860; redesignated 3rd Devonshire Light Horse Volunteers 1865; disbanded February 1875
- 5th (Berry) Devonshire MRV, raised on 24 May 1860; redesignated 1st Devonshire Light Horse Volunteers April 1861; disbanded March 1876
- 7th (Yealmpton) Devonshire MRV, raised on 16 June 1860; redesignated 2nd Devonshire Light Horse Volunteers 1865; disbanded February 1875

It was reorganised in April 1861 as the 4th Administrative Battalion with the following additional units:

- 9th (Ashburton) Devonshire RVC, raised on 23 February 1860
- 10th (Newton Abbot) Devonshire RVC, raised on 27 March 1860
- 23rd (Chudleigh) Devonshire RVC, raised on 27 March 1860
- 28th (South Brent) Devonshire RVC, raised on 14 October 1868, replacing an earlier 28th (South Molton) RVC in the 3rd Admin Bn that had disbanded in 1865; the replacement unit disbanded in 1875

The admin battalion's headquarters (HQ) moved to Newton Abbot in 1865. It was consolidated on 16 March 1880 as the 9th, renumbered on 15 June as the 5th Devonshire RVC:

- A Company at Station Road, Ashburton, from the former 9th RVC
- B Company at East Street, Newton Abbot, from the 10th RVC
- C Company at South Street, Totnes, from the 17th RVC
- D Company at Chudleigh from the 23rd RVC
- E Company at Fore Street, Kingsbridge, from the 26th RVC
- F Company at Drill Hall, Rock Road, Torquay, from the 26th RVC

It became a VB of the Devons on 1 July 1881, and on 1 November 1885 it was designated the 5th (The Hay Tor) Volunteer Battalion, Devonshire Regiment. (Hay Tor is a prominent granite tor on Dartmoor.) It formed G Company at Buckfastleigh and H Company at Torquay in 1886.

The Hon Lewis Clifford (9th Lord Clifford of Chudleigh from 1880) was commissioned as captain in the 10th Devonshire RVC on 3 March 1875, promoted to major in the consolidated 5th RVC on 24 April 1880, and then to lt-col commanding the 5th VB on 3 December 1881. He held the command until 1903 when he became the battalion's hon colonel.

=== Mobilisation schemes ===
The Stanhope Memorandum of December 1888 proposed a more comprehensive Mobilisation Scheme for Volunteer units, which would assemble in their own brigades at key points in case of war. In peacetime these brigades provided a structure for collective training. On 9 February 1889, Lord Mount Edgcumbe was appointed Colonel in command of the Plymouth Brigade, consisting of the five VBs of the Devons and the two of the Duke of Cornwall's Light Infantry and charged with defending the Royal Navy's base at Plymouth. On 29 May 1889 Lord Mount Edgcumbe gave up command of the 2nd VB, becoming its Honorary Colonel, though he continued to command the Plymouth Brigade until 1893. Lord Clifford of the 5th (Hay Tor) VB also commanded the Plymouth Brigade (renamed the Devonshire Brigade from 1901 and Devon & Cornwall Brigade in the Territorial Force from 1908) from 6 July 1901 until 1910.

=== South Africa ===
After Black Week in December 1899, the Volunteers were invited to send active service units to assist the Regulars in the Second Boer War. The War Office decided that one company 116 strong could be recruited from the volunteer battalions of any infantry regiment that had a regular battalion serving in South Africa. The Devonshire VBs accordingly raised a service company that earned the battalions their first Battle honour: South Africa 1900–01.

== Territorial Force ==
When the Volunteers were subsumed into the new Territorial Force (TF) under the Haldane Reforms of 1908, the 2nd and 5th VBs were combined to form the 5th (Prince of Wales's) Battalion, Devonshire Regiment (Note: The 'Prince of Wales's' subtitle seems to have been restored to the battalion about March 1909.)

- HQ at Prospect Place, Millbay, Plymouth (also known as Millbay Barracks)
- A Company at 38 West Street, Tavistock
- B Company at Plymouth
- C Company at Plymouth
  - Detachment at Ivybridge
  - Detachment at Fore Street, Kingsbridge
- D Company at York Street, Devonport
- E Company at Wolborough Street, Newton Abbot,
  - Detachment at Chudleigh
- F Company at Drill Hall, Somerset Place, Teignmouth
  - Half Company at Drill Hall, Market Street, Torquay
  - Detachment at Dawlish
- G Company, Left Half at Drill Hall, Ford Street, Moretonhampstead
  - Right Half at Town Hall, Bovey Tracey
  - Detachment at Chagford
- H Company, Right Half at Armoury, High Street, Totnes
  - Detachment at Station Road, Ashburton
  - Detachment at Buckfastleigh

The cyclist sections of the Devons' TF battalions were combined to form the 7th (Cyclist) Bn at Exeter. The cadet corps at Kelly College and Plymouth & Mannamead College both transferred to the junior division of the Officers' Training Corps. However, the Plymouth Lads' Brigade and Haytor (Newton Abbot) cadet corps were both affiliated to the battalion before World War I.

The battalion formed part of the Devon and Cornwall Brigade in the TF's Wessex Division.

== World War I ==
=== Mobilisation ===
On 26 July 1914, the Wessex Division was on Salisbury Plain, beginning its annual training. Three days later, with the international situation deteriorating, the division was warned to take 'precautionary measures' and its units took up their war stations, with the infantry brigades at defended ports in South West England. On 10 August the division returned to Salisbury Plain, this time under war conditions.

After the outbreak of war, units of the TF were invited to volunteer for Overseas Service. On 15 August 1914, the War Office issued instructions to separate those men who had signed up for Home Service only, and form these into reserve units. On 31 August, the formation of a reserve or 2nd Line unit was authorised for each 1st Line unit where 60 per cent or more of the men had volunteered for Overseas Service. The titles of these 2nd Line units would be the same as the original, but distinguished by a '2/' prefix. In this way duplicate battalions, brigades and divisions were created, mirroring those TF formations being sent overseas, and absorbing the large numbers of volunteers coming forward. Later the 2nd Line TF battalions were raised to full strength ready to go overseas, and began to form Reserve (3rd Line) units to supply reinforcement drafts.

=== 1/5th (Prince of Wales's) Battalion ===
==== India ====
On 24 September, the 1st Wessex Division accepted liability for service in British India to relieve Regular units for the Western Front. The division's infantry battalions and field artillery embarked at Southampton on 9 October and sailed via Gibraltar, Malta, and the Suez Canal. The Devon battalions went to Karachi, where they disembarked on 11 November.

Although the 1st Wessex was officially numbered the 43rd (Wessex) Division in early 1915, it never served as a complete formation during the war: on arrival in India all its units were distributed to various garrisons. 1/5th Devons went to Multan and came under the orders of 3rd Lahore Divisional Area (3rd (Lahore) Division having already sailed for the Western Front). In December 1915 it moved to Lahore.

No reinforcements reached the Wessex units during 1915, and their strength began to dwindle, made worse by the loss of many of the best Non-Commissioned Officers (NCOs) who were taken away for officer training. There was also a requirement to provide reinforcements for other theatres of war: the 1/5th sent a draft of 50 men to the 2nd Bn Dorsetshire Regiment who were lost at the Fall of Kut in Mesopotamia. By 1916 it was clear that the complete 43rd (Wessex) Division could not be returned to the Western Front as intended, so instead training was pushed forwards in India, some drafts were received (including a contingent from 2/5th Devons, then in Egypt), and the remaining units prepared for service in Mesopotamia.

==== Palestine ====
Formation sign of 75th Division

By March 1917, 1/5th Devons was the only unit of 130th (1/1st Devon & Cornwall) Brigade left in India. It finally embarked on 22 March from Karachi for Egypt. It arrived at Suez on 4 April, to join a new 75th Division that was being assembled for the Egyptian Expeditionary Force (EEF) largely from TF battalions sent from India. The battalion joined 232nd Brigade on 14 April, which in turn joined 75th Division on 25 June.

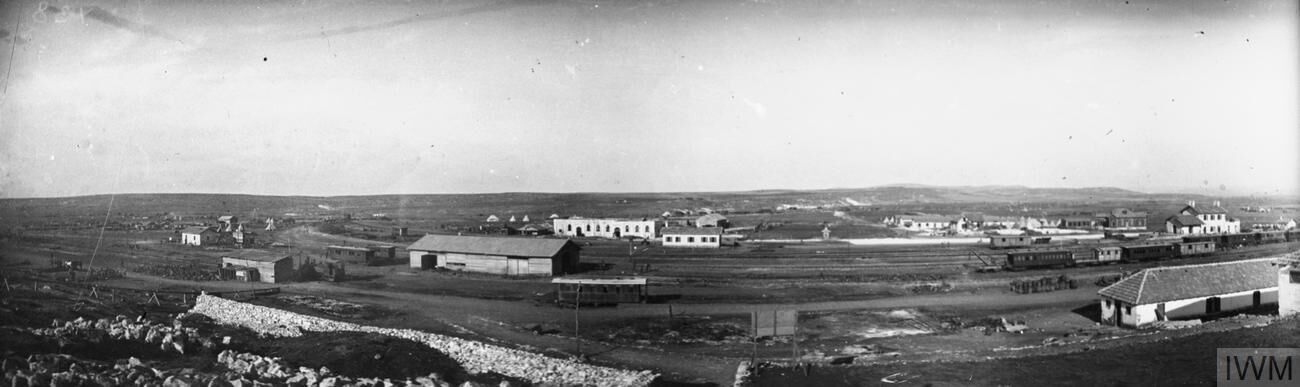
Junction Station, captured on 14 November 1917

This was the period of the Stalemate in Southern Palestine. The battalion first came under fire on 8 July at Samson's Ridge, near Gaza, then on 20 July, it suffered 80 casualties from artillery fire while supporting 1/5th Bn Bedfordshire Regiment's attack at 'Umbrella Hill'. The EEF's offensive was renewed in late October with the Third Battle of Gaza. The preliminary bombardment of the Gaza position from land and sea began on 27 October, but 75th Division's participation was initially limited to raids until after Gaza fell on 7 November. 232nd Brigade then joined the pursuit on 9 November as far as Beit Hanoun, where it found the water supply inadequate and pushed on to Deir Sneid. By 13 November the division had closed up to attack Junction Station. The first line of objectives was taken easily, but the attacking brigades were delayed in their advance to the second objective, a ridge north of Mesmiye el Gharbiye, and a gap opened up between 232nd and 233rd Brigades. 1/5th Devons were brought up to fill this, and with 1/4th Wiltshire Regiment of 233rd Bde alongside, they drove the enemy off the ridge and captured three machine guns. The troops dug in as darkness fell, and then the division swept in for the Capture of Junction Station the following morning. The battalion's casualties in the action had been 57. On 19 November it took Saris in heavy rain at the cost of another 39.

1/5th Devons missed the opening phase of the Battle of Nebi Samwil on 20 November, being detailed for escort duties, but on 23 November they took part in an attack on El Jib that ran into Turkish artillery and machine gun fire. Although it raced over the open ground in 'artillery order', the battalion's attacking force was reduced to six officers and 120 men pinned down behind the stone walls of an old vineyard. The Official History records that 'Many of the imperturbable Westcountrymen, ignoring their dangerous situation, went to sleep in the afternoon sunshine'. When the battalion resumed the advance through the winter rains it was down to a strength of just 250 men, but was reinforced in late December. After the Capture of Jerusalem 232nd Bde took part in a minor operation on 15 December to gain positions from which the artillery could reach enemy positions.

The EEF renewed its advance in the Spring with the Battle of Tell 'Asur. 75th Division attacked on 12 March 1918, with patrols of 232nd Bde going forward before dawn, then 1/5th Devons captured El-Lubban at 07.00, followed by the division's main attack. Arguably the battalion's most successful action was on 9 April at what became known as the action at Berukin, where 75th Division tried to prise open the Turkish positions for the mounted troops to pass through. 232nd Brigade attacked towards Berukin at 05.10 and when the outlying positions such as 'Tin Hat Hill' had been secured, 1/5th Devons was sent forward to attack Berukin itself. Three companies advanced up the Wadi el Mutwy until they were south of the village, then rushed it ac ross the open, covered by the other company from Tin Hat Hill. The battalion captured Berukin by 16.00. However, the advance elsewhere had stalled, and the battalion was heavily counter-attacked, fighting with bomb and bayonet going on among the houses all night. After two days' heavy fighting 75th Division had still not taken all its first day objectives and the operation was called off, although Berukin was retained and fortified.

==== Western Front ====
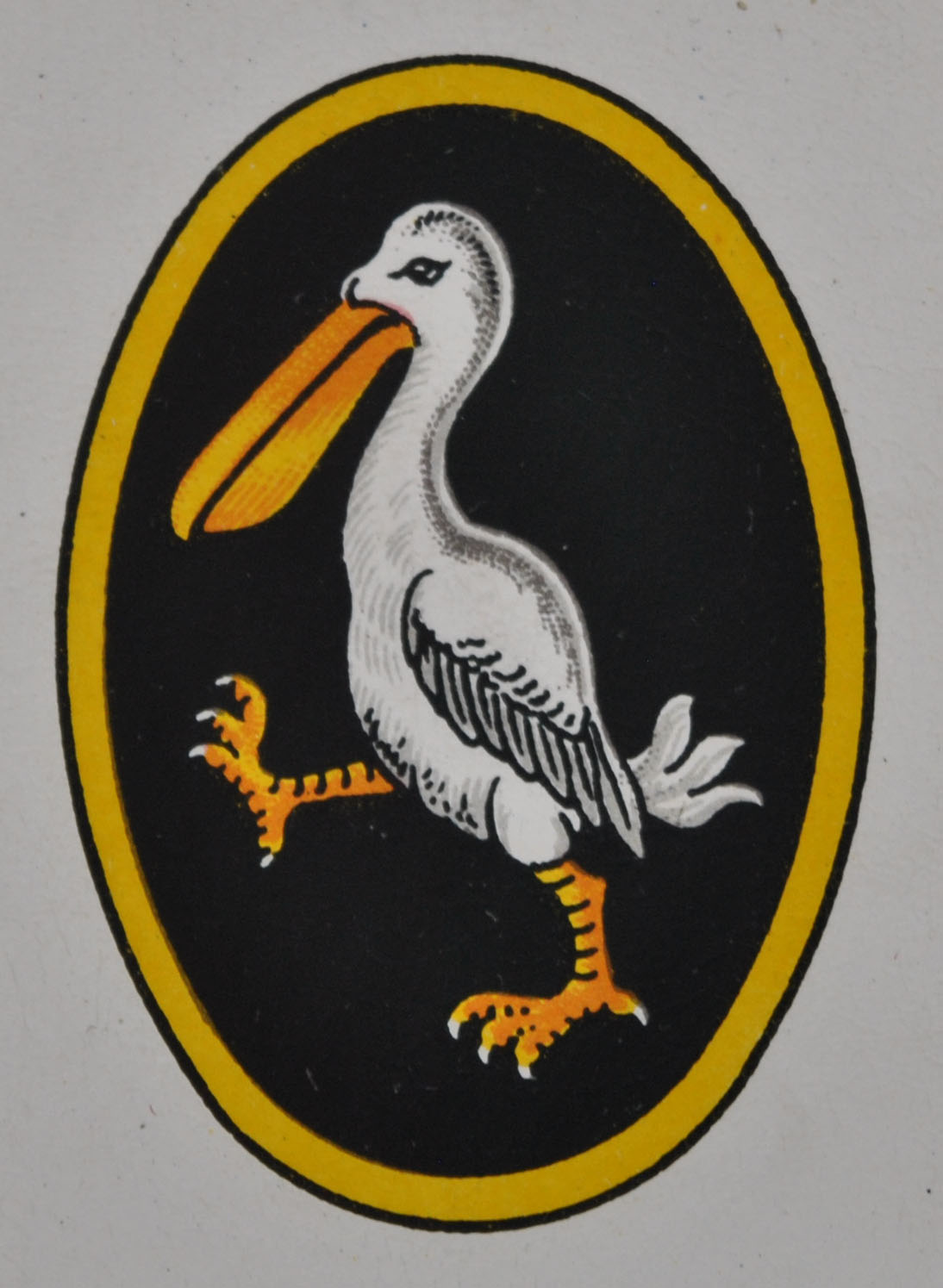
Formation sign of 62nd (2nd West Riding) Division

Berukin was 1/5th Devons' last action in the Palestine Campaign. In March the Germans had launched their Spring Offensive on the Western Front and after heavy fighting the British Expeditionary Force (BEF) was suffering a severe manpower crisis. The EEF was ordered to send British units to help, and on 26 May 1918 the battalion sailed for France, arriving at Marseille on 1 June. It then joined 185th (2/1st West Riding) Brigade in 62nd (2nd West Riding) Division.

Reconstituted after the March battles, 62nd Division was sent in July to reinforce the French armies fighting on the Marne. The last German attacks were halted and the French immediately passed to the offensive, with the British divisions attacking down the Adre Valley in the Battle of Tardenois. They had made a long approach march, their relief of the French having turned into an advance. The attack began at 08.00 on 20 July behind a barrage. Progress along the wooded valley was slow: on 22 July two companies of 1/5th Devons were sent to help 186th (2/2nd West Riding) Brigade attacking troublesome German positions in the Bois du Petit Champ. The fighting was at close range in the thick undergrowth and at one point a company of the 2/5th Duke of Wellington's Regiment was surrounded and the survivors had to cut their way out, but by nightfall the area had been cleared in what the West Riding historian described as a 'gallant little enterprise'. On 28 July 1/5th Devons supported 2/8th West Yorkshires in 'a particularly brilliant assault on the Montagne de Bligny'. It started at 04.00 in dawn half-light and mist. The Devons reached their objective at the foot of the steep slope by 07.00 before attracting enemy fire; the West Yorkshires then rushed the hill and captured most of tactically important position, despite serious casualties (the 1/5th Devons suffered 388 killed and wounded in this action). After the battle the West Riding Division's commander wrote to the Devonshire Territorial Association thanking them for the assistance the battalion had given his Yorkshiremen.

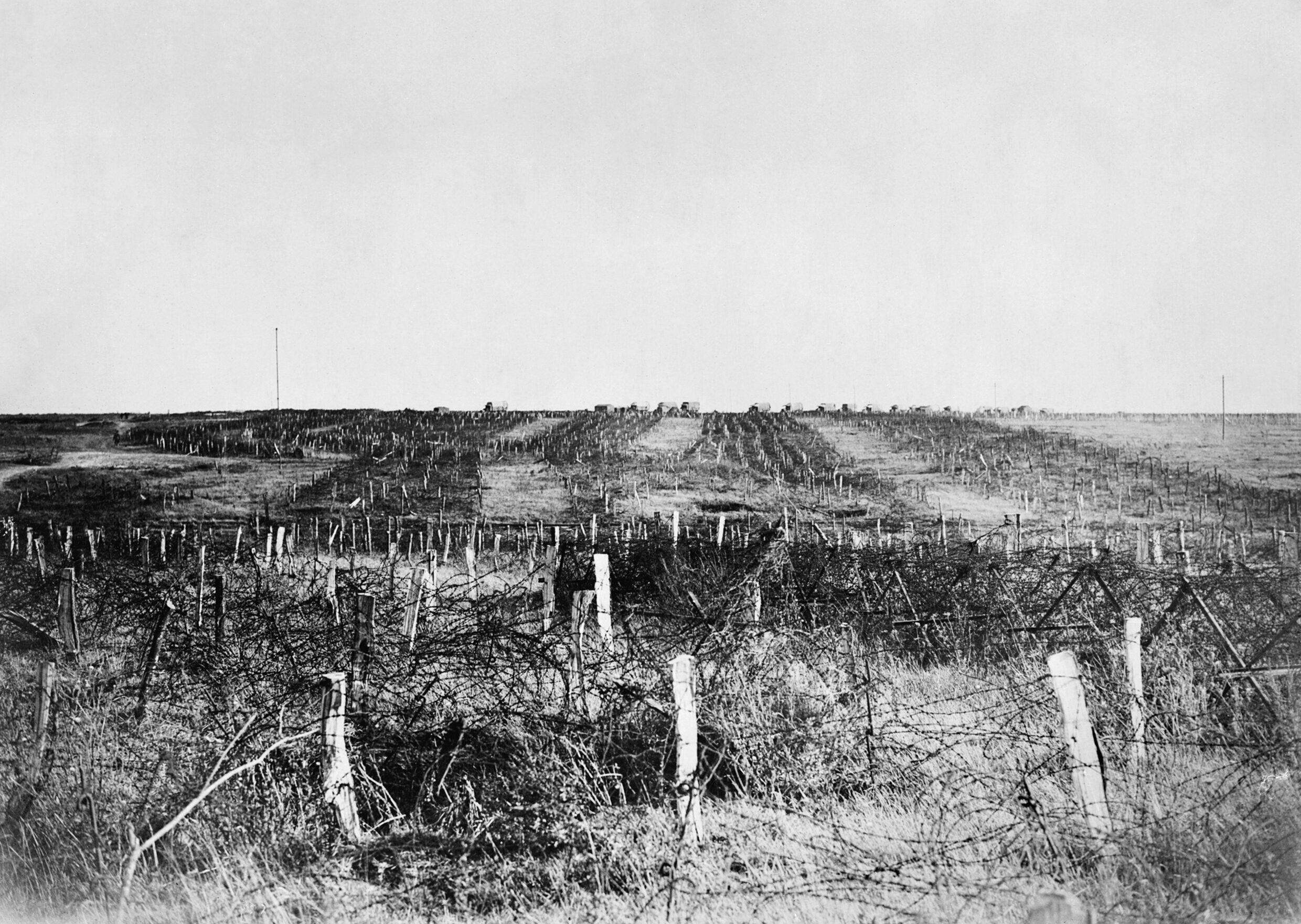
German barbed wire at Quéant

62nd Division returned to British command in August, reorganising for the Hundred Days Offensive. It took part in the Battle of the Scarpe (26–30 August), driving the enemy out of Mory, and the Battle of the Drocourt-Quéant Line (2 September), where progress was limited, despite tank support, and the division was relieved at the end of the day.

62nd Division was back in the line on 12 September for the Battle of Havrincourt, for which 185th Bde was in reserve. On 25 September near Marcoing the battalion took 350 prisoners as the BEF prepared to assault the German Hindenburg Line along the Canal du Nord. The Battle of the Canal du Nord began on 27 September. After 3rd Division had crossed the canal, 62nd Division passed through to take Ribécourt and make a deep advance into the German positions. However, 185th Bde's flank was open, and it suffered serious casualties in the advance, finally being pushed back by counter-attacks into the Hindenburg support trench. The division renewed the attack over the following days, but although it took Masnières on 29 September, it could not capture Rumilly that day or the next. The 1/5th Devon and 2/8th West Yorkshires formed the right wig and were threatened with being enveloped, but made good use of 40 Germans machine guns they had captured. They were withdrawn with their 150 prisoners that night so that the artillery could prepare the ground for the next day's attack by other formations.

By early October the battalion's strength was just 10 officers and 194 men. Nevertheless it returned to the line with 62nd Division for the attack on Solesmes on 20 October during the Battle of the Selle. The River Selle was crossed by wading and the town was captured before dawn by 186th Bde, then 185th Bde carried out the second phase of the attack with 1/5th Devons in support. The division's final action of the war came on 4 November during the Battle of the Sambre, when it came up from reserve to cross the Rhonelle stream, 185th Bde pushing on to exploit the success. On the next two days the brigade, accompanied by Whippet tanks, headed the division's pursuit of the enemy against minimal resistance. On 9 November the division entered the fortress of Maubeuge, and two days later the Armistice with Germany came into force.

On 18 November the division began a march into Germany, where it formed part of the British Army of the Rhine. Its battalions were progressively demobilised and the cadres returned to England. 1/5th Devons was finally disembodied on 11 December 1919. In its time with 62nd (2nd West Riding) Division up to December 1918, the battalion lost 10 officers and 138 other ranks killed, and 34 officers and 1058 other ranks wounded, sick or missing. In total it had lost 342 men killed or died on service during the war.

==== Commanding officers ====
The following officers commanded 1/5th (PoW) Bn during the war:

- Lt-Col E.B. Hawker, from mobilisation to 6 August 1917
- Lt-Col F.K. Windeatt, from 6 August 1917, invalided 30 April 1918
- Lt-Col H.V. Bastow, from 18 April 1918 to end of war

=== 2/5th (Prince of Wales's) Battalion ===
The 2/5th (PoW) Battalion Devonshire Regiment was formed at Plymouth on 16 September 1914 as the 1/5th Bn was preparing to go overseas, and it became part of the 2nd Devon & Cornwall Brigade in 2nd Wessex Division. It was quickly decided to send this division to India as well, where it could replace further Regular units and continue its training. However, 2/5th Devons did not go with it, remaining in the UK to recruit and train until 5 September 1915, when it sailed from Devonport to Egypt, arriving on 17 September.

In Egypt the battalion carried out garrison duties until in June 1916 it was disbanded and its personnel were distributed as reinforcements to the 1/4th, 1/5th and 1/6th Devons; 1/5th Bn was still in India (see above), the other two were by then serving in Mesopotamia.

==== Commanding officers ====
The following officers commanded 2/5th (PoW) Bn:

- Col H. Kilgour, from 26 September 1914 to 24 November 1915
- Lt-Col R.E. Tucker, from 24 November 1915 to disbandment

=== 3/5th (Prince of Wales's) Battalion ===
The 3/5th Battalion Devonshire Regiment was formed at Portland and Plymouth on 25 March 1915 under the command of Lt-Col T.H. Bingham and in the autumn it went with the other 3rd Line battalions of the Devons to Bournemouth. It was renamed the 5th (Reserve) Battalion on 8 April 1916, and when the Training Reserve (TR) was formed on 1 September it was absorbed by the 4th (Reserve) Battalion in the Wessex Reserve Brigade at Hursley Park, Winchester.

After the 3rd Line TF battalions were formed in May 1915 the remaining Home Service and unfit men were separated to form brigades of Coast Defence Battalions (termed Provisional Battalions from June 1915). The men from the five TF battalions of the Devons and DCLI were formed into 86th Provisional Battalion, as part of 10th Provisional Brigade. By July 1916 the brigade was at Herne Bay in Kent under the command of Southern Army of Central Force.

The Military Service Act 1916 swept away the Home/Foreign service distinction, and all TF soldiers became liable for overseas service, if medically fit. The Provisional Brigades thus became anomalous, and on 1 January 1917 the remaining battalions became numbered battalions of their parent units: 86th Provisional Bn became 15th Battalion, Devonshire Regiment, and 10th Provisional Brigade became the 227th Mixed Brigade. Part of these units' role alongside the TR units was physical conditioning to render men fit for drafting overseas. The brigade never served overseas: it moved to Aldeburgh in 1918 and was attached to 67th (2nd Home Counties) Division. It was disbanded on 12 June 1919 at Aldingham Camp, Lancashire.

== Interwar ==
The TF was reformed on 7 February 1920 and reorganised as the Territorial Army (TA) the following year. As before, the 5th Devons were in 130th (Devon and Cornwall) Infantry Brigade in 43rd (Wessex) Division.

In the 1920s and 1930s the following cadet companies were affiliated to the battalion:

- The Plymouth Cadet Corps
- Newton Abbot Cadet Corps
- Devonport High School Cadet Corps
- Tavistock Grammar School Cadet Corps
- Newton Abbot Secondary School Cadet Company
- Dartmouth Cadet Company
- Kingsbridge Grammar School Cadet Company

After the Munich Crisis in late 1938 the TA was doubled in size, and once again its units formed duplicates. The 5th (PoW) Battalion's duplicate was the 7th (Hay Tor) Battalion (taking the number of the disbanded Cyclist Battalion and the subtitle of the former 5th Volunteer Battalion), which was formed on 17 June 1939 at Torquay.

The two Regular battalions of the Devons had been converted into specialist machine gun (MG) battalions in 1937 and the 5th and 7th battalions conformed. At this period the establishment of an MG battalion was an HQ Company and four MG companies each equipped with 12 Vickers machine guns, a total of 48 MGs and about 740 men.

== World War II ==
=== Mobilisation and early war years ===
The TA was embodied on 1 September 1939, ahead of the declaration of war on 3 September. Both battalions were unassigned (Army Troops) in South-Western Area of Southern Command. During the early part of the war, the two battalions were attached as MG battalions to 43rd (Wessex) Division and its second line duplicate 45th Division respectively, both of which were serving in Home Defence in the West Country.

After the Dunkirk evacuation, 43rd Division was moved to defend London while 45th Division was stationed in the prime invasion area of the Sussex Coast while the Battle of Britain raged overhead. In June 135th Brigade of 45th Division was defending the Royal Military Canal, which was fortified with pillboxes for machine gun and anti-tank guns, and on 25 August D Company, 5th Devons, joined 31st Independent Brigade Group, also stationed along the Canal. On 13 October the company was designated 31st Independent Brigade Group MG Company (Devon); it remained with the brigade group until 5 August 1941. By the Spring of 1941, 43rd Division was defending East Kent while 45th was in GHQ Reserve in the Midlands, but at the end of the year 45th Division's role was reduced as it was placed on a lower establishment.

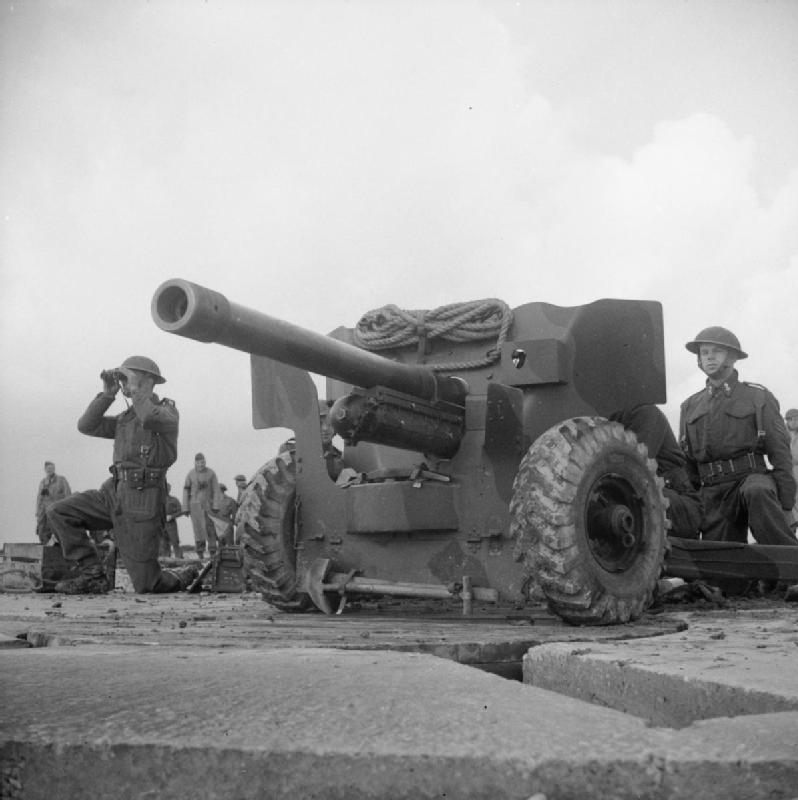
6-Pounder gun of 86th A/T Rgt at Lydd, 24 September 1942

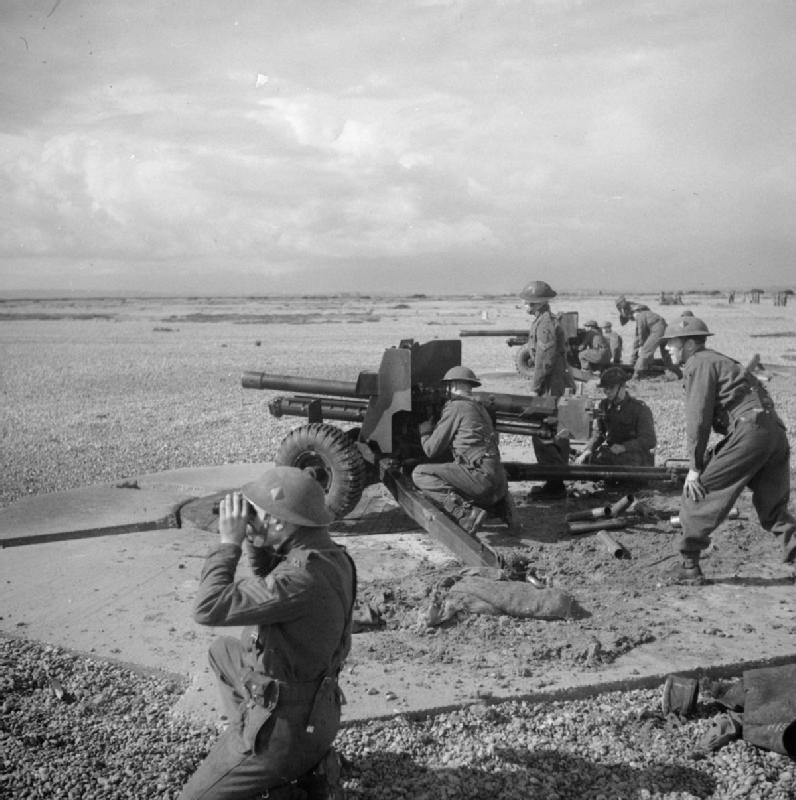
6-Pounder A/T guns (nearest at full recoil) conducting a shoot at Lydd, 24 September 1942

On 1 November 1941 both battalions were converted into anti-tank (A/T) regiments of the Royal Artillery, though they were permitted to retain their Devons cap badges, and appear to have adopted the subtitles '5th Devons' or 'Devons' even if these were never officially authorised. Each regiment consisted of four batteries designated A, B, C and D, but on 11 March 1942, in common with a number of other A/T regiments, the batteries were redesignated Q, R, S and T respectively. On 28 July each regiment provided one battery (T Bty of 86th, R Bty of 87th) to form a new 78th A/T Rgt (Note: S Battery of 78th A/T Rgt was provided by 88th A/T Rgt, converted from 2/9th Bn Manchester Regiment at the same time as the two Devon regiments.)

=== 86th (5th Devon) Anti-Tank Regiment ===
After conversion training the regiment was assigned to XII Corps in the field army by April 1942. It then underwent intensive training on the 6-pounder A/T gun, including a practice shoot at the artillery ranges at Lydd in Kent that was photographed by a War Office official photographer. On 1 January 1943, Q, R and S Btys were numbered as 128, 129 and 130 A/T Btys, and when the establishment for a corps A/T regiment was increased, a new 340 A/T Bty was formed within the regiment on 25 June 1943.

Formation sign of XII Corps

By the summer of 1943 XII Corps, with 86th A/T Rgt, was part of 21st Army Group training for the Allied invasion of Normandy (Operation Overlord). For 'Overlord', as Corps anti-tank regiment, 86th A/T Rgt was equipped with two batteries (128 and 130) of 17-pounder guns towed by turretless Crusader tanks, and two self-propelled (SP) batteries (129 and 340) with US-supplied M10 tank destroyers converted to 17-pdr SP Achilles standard. Each battery comprised three Troops of four guns.

==== Normandy ====
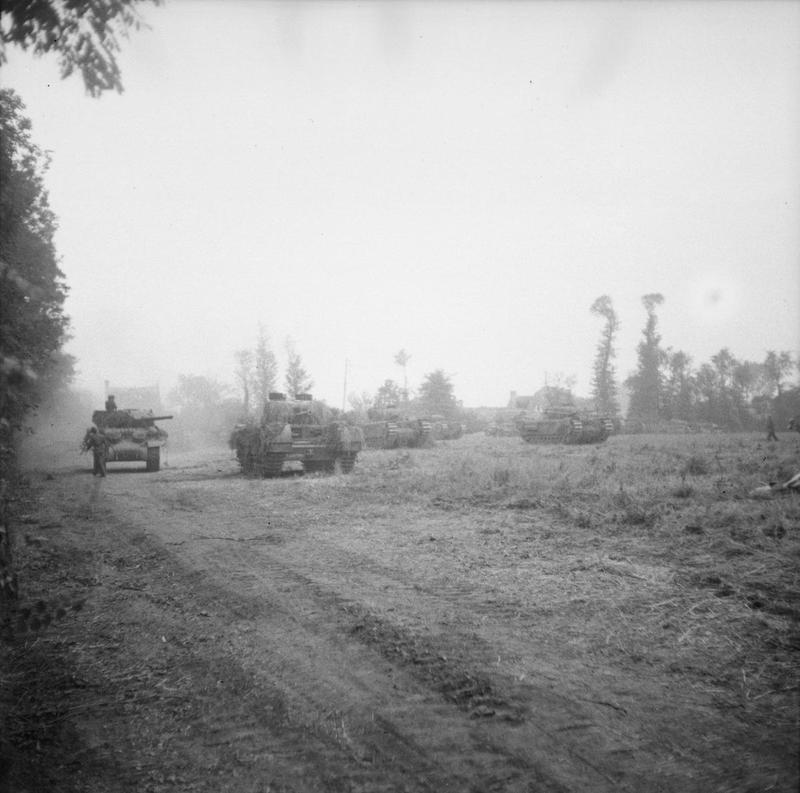
Churchill tanks of 31st Tank Brigade, accompanied by an M10 (left of picture) possibly of 340 A/T Bty, moving up to attack during Operation Jupiter

XII Corps was not among the assault formations on D Day (6 June 1944) and its subordinate formations and units were fed into the Normandy beachhead over the weeks following the landings. In fact, 86th A/T Rgt fought its first action under the orders of VIII Corps before XII Corps HQ had landed. This was in support of 43rd Wessex Division, 46th Highland Brigade (of 15th (Scottish) Division) and 31st Tank Brigade in an attack to capture Éterville, Maltot and Hill 112 (Operation Jupiter). The attack was launched early on 10 July behind a massive artillery barrage. The defending German Panzergrenadiers and Panzer IV tanks of 1st and 10th SS Panzer Divisions were supported by Tiger I tanks of 102nd SS Heavy Panzer Battalion. Although themselves heavily armoured, the Churchill tanks of 31st Tank Brigade were badly outgunned by tanks such as Tigers, so the thinly-armoured M10 Achilles of 86th A/T Rgt were sent up to give them covering fire with their long-range 17-pdrs. A sergeant of E Troop later complained that the regiment had spent three years training to defend captured ground, yet here they were being used in the offensive. E Troop accompanied C Squadron, 9th Royal Tank Regiment (9th RTR) attacking Éterville with 4th Dorsets. The attack went well, but it took the infantry longer than expected to winkle out the SS strongpoints. One of the open-topped M10s was knocked out by a mortar bomb. Meanwhile 7th RTR supported 129th Brigade's attack on Hill 112, the M10s dealing with a Tiger that had knocked out four Churchills, and then dealing with machine-guns nests. Tackling the strongly-defended crest of the hill the 17-pdrs of 86th's M10s were also useful support, some giving close support to the infantry, others standing back and engaging targets of opportunity. 130th Brigade's attack on Maltot went badly; 9th RTR's Churchills and the M10s were caught in a crossfire coming from the uncaptured part of Hill 112 and from beyond Éterville and took heavy casualties; 7th Hampshire Regiment got into the village but was almost destroyed. 4th Dorsets and E Troop of 86th A/T Rgt were sent to help, E Trp losing two more M10s, one to an airburst shell over the turret, the other to a direct hit by an 88mm gun. The remaining M10 took up a hull-down position to provide what support it could. A troop of towed 17-pdrs of 130 Bty was brought up to place an anti-tank screen round the south of the village while 4th Dorsets fought to suppress the strongpoints inside the village. The troop was overrun by a German counter-attack, and after firing all their small arms ammunition the crews had to remove the breechblocks from their guns and retreat to the infantry's slit trenches, losing half the troop in the process. The planned follow-up breakthrough by 4th Armoured Brigade was cancelled, and Maltot was evacuated, with few of the Dorsets or Hampshires getting back. At the end of the first day of bloody fighting day 43rd Division had Éterville and the northern half of Hill 112, while the Germans retained the southern half and Maltot, and the offensive fell into stalemate.

On 12 July XII Corps HQ became operational and took over control of the Odon Salient left after Jupiter, making demonstrations while VIII Corps attempted an armoured thrust south from Caen (Operation Goodwood). Later it maintained pressure along the line while VIII and XXX Corps switched the emphasis to the west and attacked towards Caumont and Mont Pinçon. On 3 August the Germans on its front began to withdraw, and the corps followed up, hindered by mines and demolitions. By mid-August most of the Germans forces were cornered in the Falaise Pocket, and soon afterwards 21st Army Group was racing to the Seine.

==== North-West Europe ====
XII Corps crossed the Seine near Louviers on 27 August and then advanced quickly to the Somme; by early September it was driving across Belgium towards Antwerp. Once Second Army had a bridgehead across the Albert Canal, XII Corps moved east and took over its defence to free XXX Corps for its role in Operation Market Garden. While XXX Corps attempted a deep thrust through German lines to link up the 'airborne carpet' as far as Arnhem, XII Corps extended the bridgeheads across the Meuse–Escaut canal and fought its way up on the left flank to Eindhoven. After the failure of Market Garden, 43rd (Wessex) Division was reinforced and left to defend 'The Island', the low-lying ground that had been captured between the Waal and the Nederrijn. 86th A/T Regiment coordinated an elaborate programme for all the anti-tank guns across the five-brigade front.

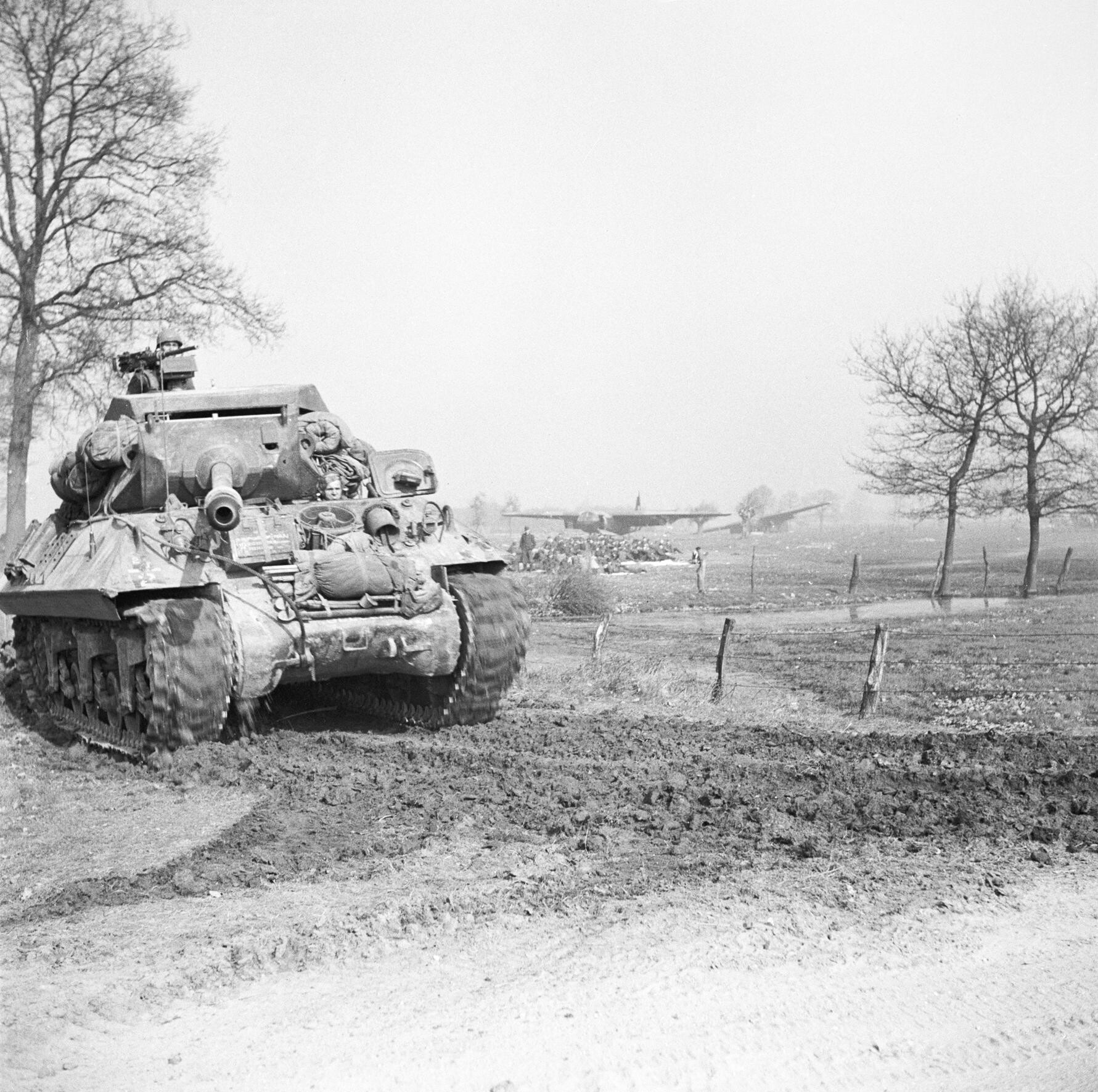
M10 Achilles on the east bank of the Rhine, 1945

XII Corps launched Operation Pheasant in late October to clear the ground towards the Meuse (Dutch: Maas) before winter set in, involving all-arms set-piece battles at 's-Hertogenbosch, Tilburg and Blerick. This was followed in January 1945 by Operation Blackcock to clear the 'Roer Triangle'. The opponents were primarily infantry formations, so opportunities for anti-tank action were limited.

XII Corps was given a leading role in the crossing of the Rhine (Operation Plunder), but large A/T guns and M10s could play no part until the Royal Engineers had established heavy ferries and bridges. 15th (S) Division carried out the assault crossing (Operation Torchlight), on the night of 23/24 March, after which the corps gave priority to ferrying across a mobile striking force of armour and armoured infantry. (Note: Although the advance on 25 March was supported by SP A/T guns these were probably from 15th (S) Division's own 102nd (Northumberland Hussars) A/T Rgt.) After a stiff fight, XII Corps was concentrated in the bridgehead by the end of 26 March, ready for its breakout across North Germany to the Elbe, which involved fighting against rearguards.

The fighting ended with the German surrender at Lüneburg Heath, after which the units of 21st Army Group carried out occupation duties in Germany. 86th (5th Devon) Anti-Tank Regiment was placed in suspended animation on 1 March 1946.

=== 87th (Devon) Anti-Tank Regiment ===
Formation sign of IX Corps

87th (Devon) A/T Rgt was formed at Newton Abbot on 1 November 1941. On 25 January 1942 the regiment joined 77th Infantry Division, a home defence formation created from the Devon and Cornwall County Division, which had been a static coast defence organisation. It now formed part of VIII Corps in the field force. The regiment left on 30 October 1942 and was assigned to IX Corps, which was preparing to go to North Africa in Operation Torch.

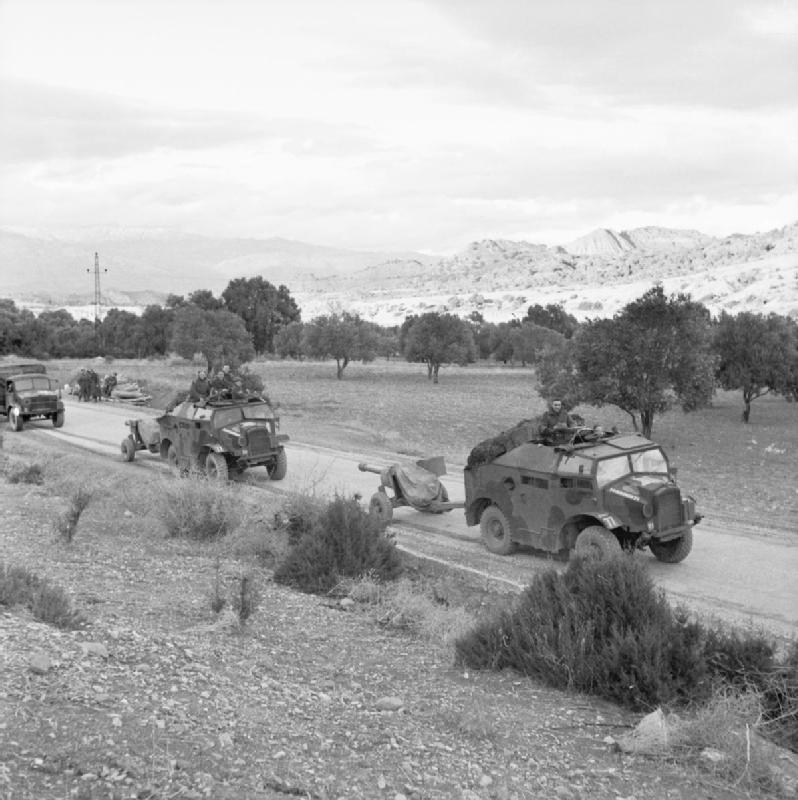
6-Pounder A/T guns towed by Quad tractors moving up in Tunisia

Equipped with 6-pdrs, 87th A/T Rgt landed in North Africa with First Army in February 1943. By 5 March IX Corps HQ and all the Corps Troops had all arrived in Algiers, and reached their concentration area at El Ksar on 24 March. The first operation for the corps was to capture the Fondouk Pass, and the regiment saw action in the fierce battles around Bou Arada and Medjez el Bab before the final successful assault on Tunis (Operation Strike).

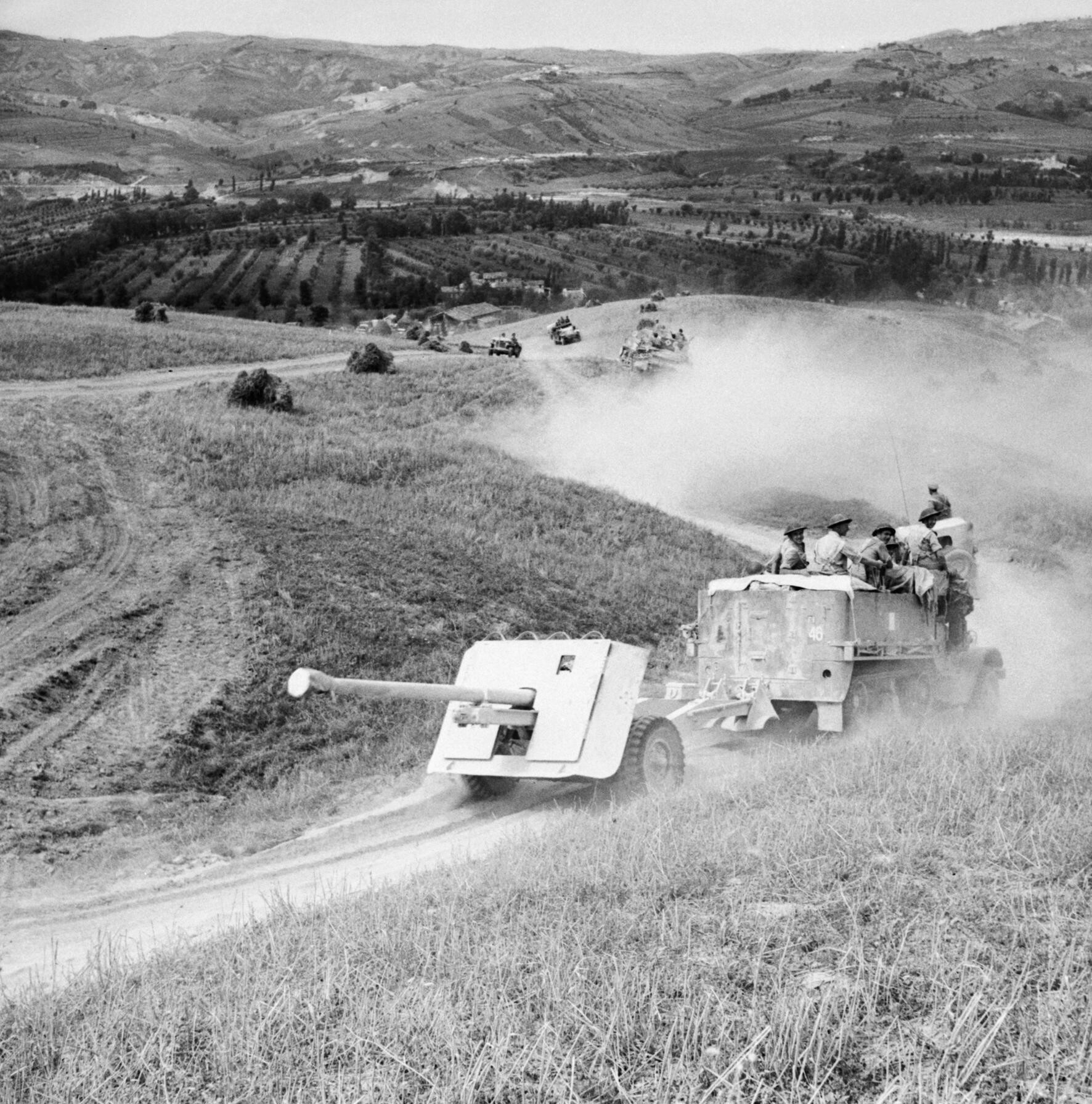
A 17-pounder gun of 87th A/T Reegiment towed by a half-track approaches the River Foglia, 1 September 1944

HQ IX Corps was disbanded on 31 May 1943 at the end of the Tunisian Campaign, but 87th AT Rgt took part in the Italian Campaign under Eighth Army. However, by 1944 the British Army in Italy was facing a manpower crisis, especially in infantry, and a policy was begun of disbanding redundant artillery units and retraining their manpower. As a 'spare' corps A/T unit in a theatre that saw little armoured combat, 87th (Devon) Anti-Tank Regiment was one of those selected: it was broken up in May and officially placed in suspended animation on 26 June 1944. However, the regiment's band and Corps of drums had such a high reputation that it continued as an independent unit in Middle East Forces after the disbandment.

== Postwar ==
When the TA was reconstituted on 1 January 1947, both regiments were reformed. 86th Anti-Tank Rgt reverted to infantry as 5th (Prince of Wales's) Battalion once more, with the following organisation:

- HQ at Mutley Barracks, Plymouth
- A Company at Plymouth
- B Company at Newton Abbot
- C Company at Totnes
- D Company at Dartmouth

Once again the battalion formed part of 130 (West Country) Infantry Bde in 43rd (Wessex) Division. The battalion was also referred to as 43rd Wessex MG Battalion (5th Devons). However, together with 628 Heavy Anti-Aircraft Regiment, RA (formerly the 6th Devons) it was merged into the 4th Devons on 15 May 1950.

87th Anti-Tank Rgt remained with the Royal Artillery, reforming at Devonport on 1 January 1947 as 396th (Devon) Light Anti-Aircraft Regiment, providing the anti-aircraft component of 43rd (Wessex) Division. On 1 July 1950 it was amalgamated into 256th (Devon) (Mixed) Light Anti-Aircraft/Searchlight Regiment.

== Uniforms and insignia ==
The uniform of the 2nd (PoW) VB was green with scarlet facings; the full dress of the cyclist section was Drab in 1907. The uniform of the 5th (Hay Tor) VB was scarlet with green facings, changing to white in 1895. The combined battalion in the TF adopted the scarlet uniform with Lincoln green facings of the Devons as its full dress.

When the 5th and 7th Bns were transferred to the Royal Artillery in 1941, they were permitted to retain the Devons' cap badge, worn with the RA 'grenade' collar badge. The 5th (PoW) Bn sometimes used (for example on stationery) a version of the Devonshire Regiment badge surmounted by the Prince of Wales's feathers and a scroll bearing the words 'Prince of Wales'.

== Honorary Colonels ==
The following served as Honorary Colonels of the battalions:

2nd (Prince of Wales's) Volunteer Battalion

- William Edgcumbe, 4th Earl of Mount Edgcumbe, GCVO, VD, former CO, appointed 29 May 1889, continued with 5th (PoW) Bn in the TF, died 1917

5th (Hay Tor) Volunteer Battalion

- Lewis, 9th Lord Clifford of Chudleigh, VD, former CO, appointed 28 August 1903, listed as having resigned when the battalion was merged with the 2nd VB in the TF on 31 March 1908

5th (Prince of Wales's) Battalion

- Edward, Prince of Wales, appointed 29 March 1919, until his accession as King Edward VIII in 1936
- Bt Col Godfrey Wycisk, OBE, TD, former CO, appointed 2 November 1940, continued with 4th Bn after 1950

7th (Hay Tor) Battalion

- Gen Sir John Coleridge, GCB, CMG, DSO, appointed 25 January 1941

== Other personalities ==
- Edward Pellew, 4th Viscount Exmouth, previously a lieutenant in the 1st Devon Militia (later the 4th Battalion, Devonshire Regiment) and then the Royal 1st Devon Yeomanry (subsequently resigned) was recommissioned as a lieutenant in the 5th (Hay Tor) VB and later promoted to captain.
- On 7 June 1924 the Hon Charles Clifford, nephew of the former CO and Hon Col of the 5th (Hay Tor) Bn, who had served in World War I as a Sub-lieutenant in the Royal Naval Volunteer Reserve, was commissioned from Private to Lieutenant in the battalion, and simultaneously promoted to provisional captain. He succeeded as 11th Lord Clifford of Chudleigh in 1943.

== External Sources ==
- Bedfordshire Regiment in the Great War (archive site)
- British Army units from 1945 on
- Mark Conrad, The British Army, 1914 (archive site)
- The Drill Hall Project
- Infantry Battalion COs of World War I
- The Keep Military Museum.
- The Long, Long Trail
- Orders of Battle at Patriot Files
- Land Forces of Britain, the Empire and Commonwealth – Regiments.org (archive site)
- Royal Artillery Units Netherlands 1944–1945
- Graham Watson, The Territorial Army 1947
- 62nd Division in the Great War (archive site)
