= St Mary's and St Julian's Church, Maker =

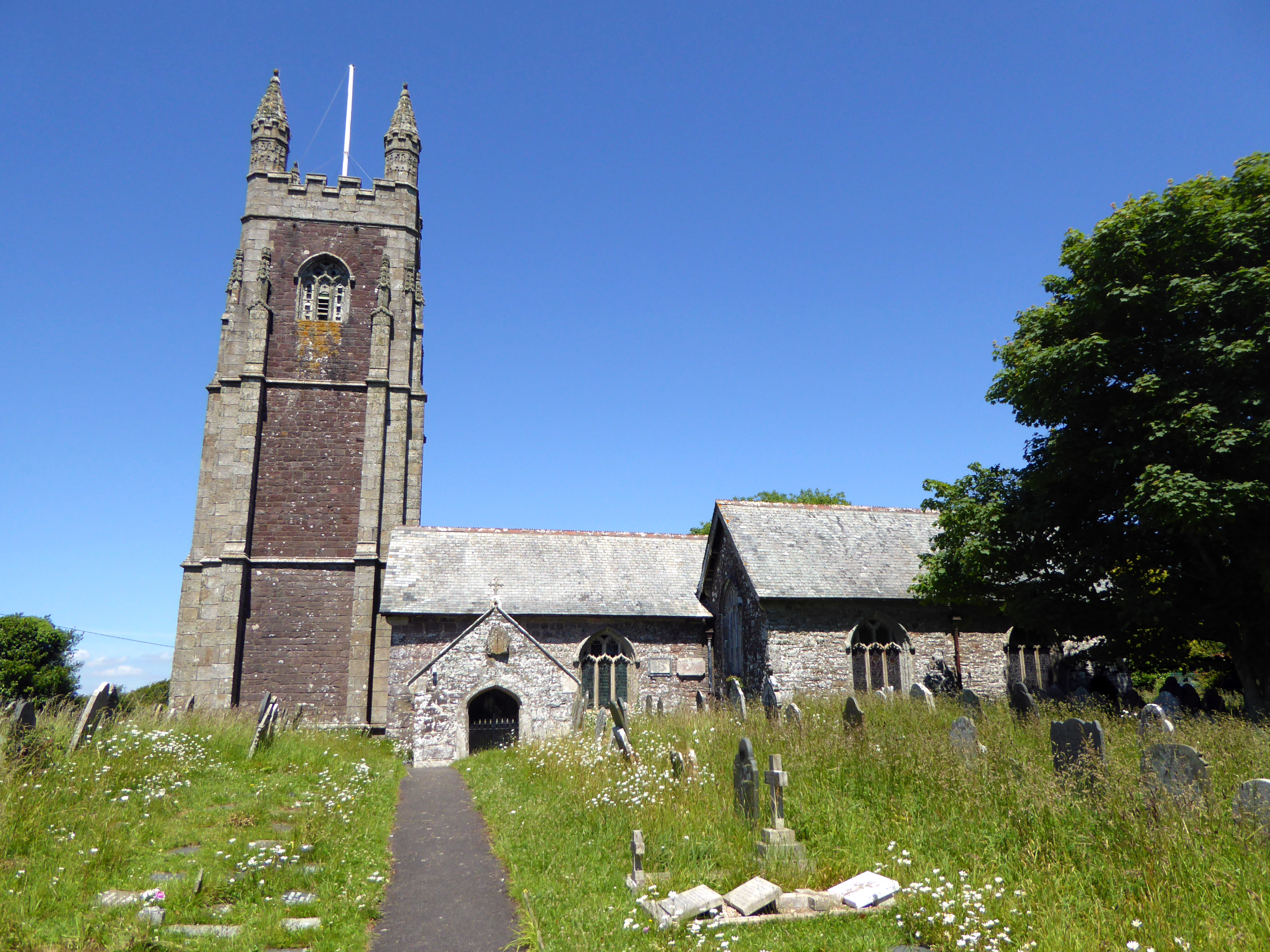
- St Mary's and St Julian's Church, Maker
- 50.3472°N 4.1850°W
- Location: Maker, Cornwall, England
- Denomination: Church of England

History
- Status: Active
- Location within Cornwall

Listed Building – Grade I
- Official name: Church of St Mary and St Julian
- Designated: 23 January 1968
- Reference no.: 1140716

St Mary's and St Julian's Church is a Church of England parish church in Maker, Cornwall, England, UK. The church dates to the 15th century and has been a Grade I listed building since 1968.

== History ==
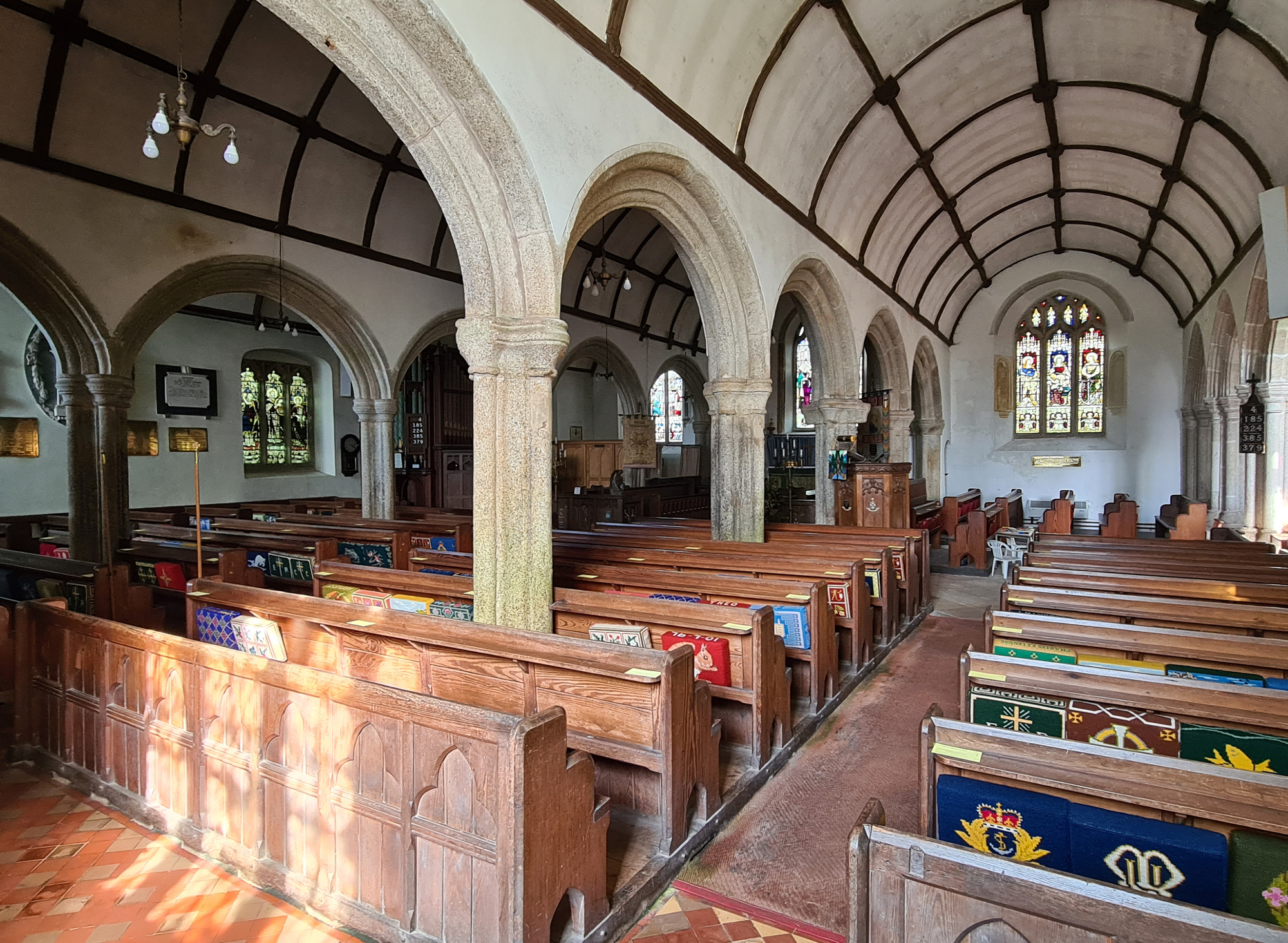
The interior of St Mary's and St Julian's Church.

The existing church has been dated to the 15th century, with the nave and chancel possibly of an earlier date. The first record of a church at Maker dates to the 12th century, when one was granted to Plympton Priory. The church's prominent position has made it a landmark for navigators, and its tower was used as an Admiralty signal station during the 18th century and Napoleonic Wars.

=== 1873–74 restoration ===
A major restoration of the church was undertaken in 1873–74, at a time when much of the building had fallen into decay, including the windows, pews, chancel fittings, roof and flooring. When Rev. F. T. Wintle became vicar of the parish in 1866, he began fundraising towards a restoration scheme. A working committee was formed and James Piers St Aubyn of London hired as the architect. Philip Blowey of Buckland Monachorum was contracted to carry out the work, which cost approximately £1,662 with another £75 for the installation of a heating apparatus. Contributions to the fund were received from the Earl of Mount Edgcumbe and the local landowner Lord Clinton.

The entire church was re-roofed and extensively renovated. The building was reseated in pitch pine, the chancel refitted in wainscot and the floor relaid with encaustic tiles, supplied by Webb of Worcester. With the removal of the galleries, additional space was made with the creation of a new south aisle, the arches of which are constructed of granite from Bere Alston. During the restoration an ancient fireplace was discovered and its flue utilised for the new heating apparatus. The Earl commissioned Messrs. Lavers and Barrand of London to create a memorial window in remembrance of his aunts, Lady Brownlow and Lady Caroline Macdonald, and his father's elder brother.

The church's reopening on 18 June 1874 was attended by the Bishop of Exeter, Frederick Temple, and the Earl and members of his family. In 1875, the church's harmonium was replaced by an organ built by Messrs Hele & Co of Plymouth at a cost of £230. It was installed in the north transept and opened on 16 July 1875. A chapel of ease was opened in 1867 at the newly built Cremyll Schoolroom to serve residents at Cremyll. A second chapel-of-ease, St Paul's, was opened in 1882 to serve the village of Kingsand.

== Design ==
St Mary and St Julian's is built of local red sandstone, with dressings in granite, in the Perpendicular style. It is made up of a nave, north and south aisles, chancel, north transept (vestry and organ chamber), south porch and a three-stage tower to the west. An additional south aisle was added in the restoration of 1873–74 and is known as the Edgcumbe Chapel. The church's Bodmin style font is 12th century and was formerly at St Merryn. The sundial erected above the entrance is dated 1768 and the holy water stoup in the porch was discovered in the churchyard in 1923. The tower contains six bells, which were recast in 1808 but are of an earlier date.

== Monuments ==
The church contains a number of monuments:

Tower

- Robert Salmon, 1682, ledger stone
- William Phisick, 1707, ledger stone
- Elizabeth Tucker, 1722, ledger stone
- Elizabeth Canniford, 1809, ledger stone

North aisle

- Joseph Hunt, 1761, monument
- Grace Ayres, 1766, tablet
- Edward Hunt, 1787, tablet
- Rev. Samuel Whiddon, 1866, tablet
- S.C. Avery, 1882, tablet

South aisle

- Phill and Elizabeth Triggs, 1664, monument
- John Ingram, 1669, monument
- Judith Rowe, 1784, tablet

Chancel

- Maria Bint, 1787, tablet
- Jane Bint, 1795, tablet

Edgcumbe Chapel

- Piers Edgcumbe Esq, 1607, ledger stone
- Sir Richard Edgcumbe, 1638, tablet
- Richard Edgcumbe, 1st Baron Edgcumbe, 1758, tablet
- Richard Edgcumbe, 2nd Baron Edgcumbe, 1761, tablet
- John Boger, 1783, tablet
- George Edgcumbe, 1st Earl of Mount Edgcumbe, 1795, tablet
- Elizabeth Boger, 1804, tablet
- Sophia, Countess of Mount Edgcumbe, 1806, monument
- Richard Edgcumbe, 2nd Earl of Mount Edgcumbe, 1839, tablet
- William Edgcumbe, 4th Earl of Mount Edgcumbe, 1917, monument

=== Churchyard ===
In 1987, a number of headstones in the churchyard became Grade II listed:

- William Little, 1735, and Mary Little, 1750
- Sampson Chynoweth, 1749
- Ann Pring, 1756
- Thomas Colmer, 1764
- Mary Colmer, 1766
- Elizabeth Ellis (and other members of family), 1768
- James, Edward and Jane Stephens, 1771
- William Tuson, 1771
- Isaac Sargent, 1777
- Richard Woolver, 1789
- John Chubb, 1790
- Thomasin Knight, 1790
- Hannah Gory, 1791
- Josias Eason Colmer, 1792
- Mary Lawrence, 1797
- William Trery, 1810
- Charles Waters, RN, c. 1810
- John May, 1814
- Mary Nichole, 1830
- Mary Vallack, 1835
- Eliza Mason, 1838
- John May, 1855

Other Grade II listed monuments:

- Chest tomb for John Skardon (and other members of family), 1775
- Ledger stone for Judith Beale, indecipherable date, 18th century
- Indecipherable chest tomb, early 19th century
- Obelisk for Christian Lyne Walkom (and other members of family), 1868
- Chest tomb for Richard Rule (and other members of family), 1871
