= Cremyll School and Chapel =

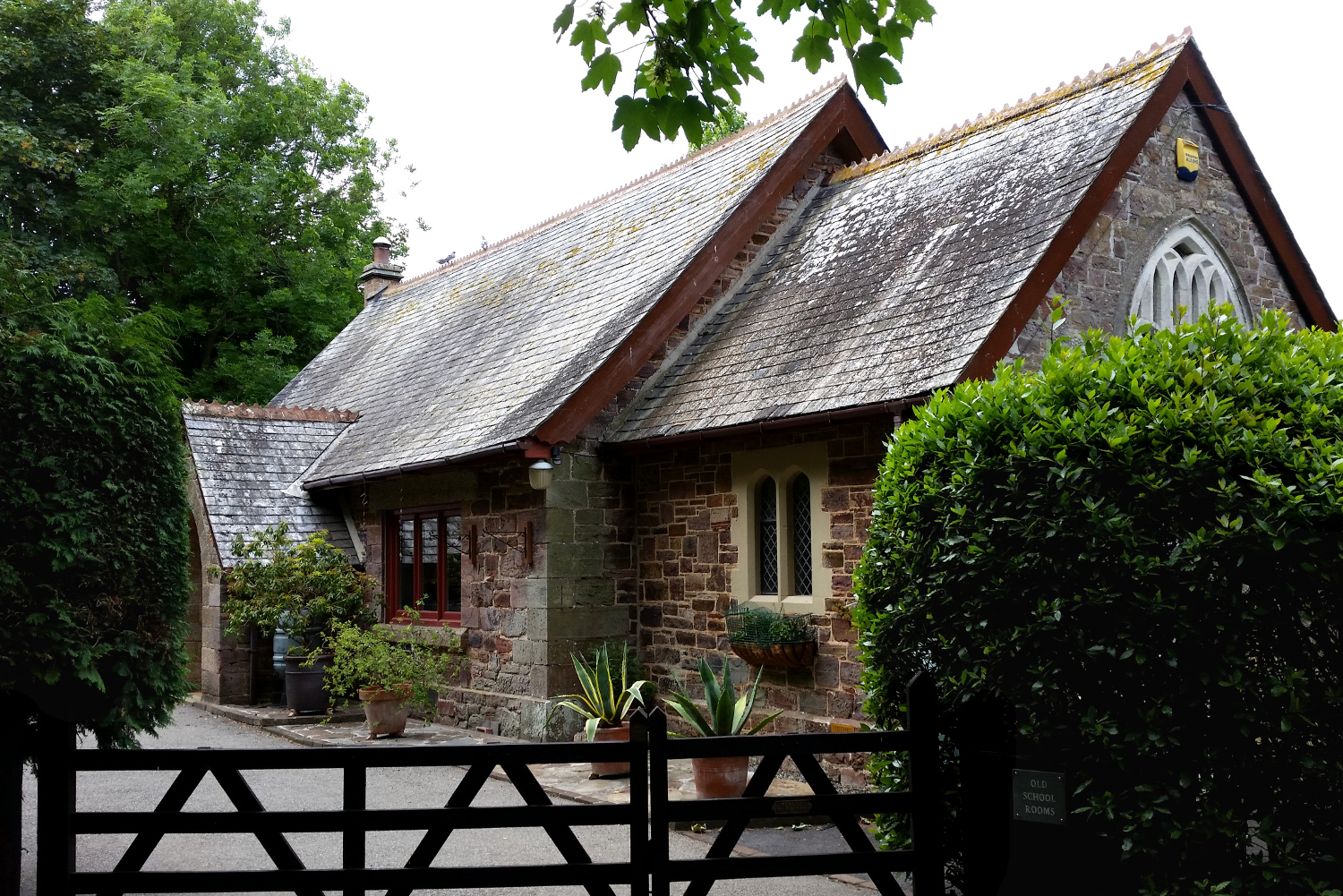

Religion
- Affiliation: Church of England
- Ecclesiastical or organisational status: Closed

Location
- Location: Cremyll, Cornwall, England
- Interactive map of Cremyll School and Chapel
- Coordinates: 50.3601°N 4.1763°W

Architecture
- Type: Church
- Completed: 1867

Cremyll School and Chapel is a former schoolroom and chapel in Cremyll, Cornwall, England. It was erected in 1867 and is now a private residence, known as the Old School Rooms.

== History ==
Cremyll's schoolroom and chapel was built at the expense of the Earl of Mount Edgcumbe, William Edgcumbe in 1867. It was erected primarily for use as a school, but was also dedicated for worship. This allowed the building to serve as a chapel of ease to the parish church of St Mary and St Julian, for the convenience of the residents of Cremyll, who were about a mile from the parish church. The Bishop of Exeter, the Right Rev. Henry Phillpotts, granted the schoolroom a licence to hold divine worship on 17 July 1867.

During the building's early use as a chapel, the lack of a chancel was considered a great inconvenience, which resulted in the Earl of Mount Edgcumbe later offering to build one. Most of the cost was defrayed by the Earl, however small, voluntary contributions amounting to approximately £10 were also received from local residents. The chancel was built by workmen of the Earl's estate at the eastern end of the building, to the plans of Mr. Perkyns, the architect to the manor of East Stonehouse. The chapel reopened on 1 April 1884.

In 1902, the school was recorded as having a capacity of 55 children, with an average attendance of 42. The building's use as a school ceased in circa 1932, but its use as a mission chapel continued until circa 1971. The building is now a private residence, known as the Old School Rooms.
