= Piers Edgcumbe, 5th Earl of Mount Edgcumbe =

The Right Honourable The Earl of Mount Edgcumbe DL
- Born: 2 July 1865; England
- Died: 18 April 1944 aged 78; England
- Education: Oxford University
- Spouse: Lady Edith Villiers
- Parent(s): William Henry Edgcumbe, 4th Earl of Mount Edgcumbe; Lady Katherine Hamilton
- Military career
- Allegiance: United Kingdom
- Service years: 1891–1902
- Rank: Captain
- Unit: 3rd Militia of the Duke of Cornwall's Light Infantry
- Conflicts: Second Boer War

Piers Alexander Hamilton Edgcumbe, 5th Earl of Mount Edgcumbe DL (1865–1944), was a soldier who served in the South African War with distinction.

He was the son of William Henry Edgcumbe, 4th Earl of Mount Edgcumbe by his first wife, Lady Katherine Hamilton, fourth daughter of James Hamilton, 1st Duke of Abercorn and his wife, Lady Louisa Russell.

Educated at Oxford University and a keen horseman, he was part of the varsity polo team playing against Cambridge in 1885–1887.

He was appointed a captain in the 3rd (Militia) Battalion of The Duke of Cornwall's Light Infantry on 23 March 1891. After the outbreak of the Boer War in 1899, he went to serve in South Africa. He left Cape Town for the United Kingdom in early May 1902, shortly before the end of the war. The Mount Edgecombe suburb of the city of Durban is named after him.

He succeeded his father to the earldom and Mount Edgcumbe House in 1917. He had married in 1911 Lady Edith Villiers, the only daughter of Edward Hyde Villiers, 5th Earl of Clarendon. They had no children. In January 1921, they were in Gibraltar with Lord Birkenhead (Lord Chancellor) and Smith Dorrien. He was succeeded by his cousin, Kenelm William Edward Edgcumbe, 6th Earl of Mount Edgcumbe.

Peerage of Great Britain
| Preceded by William Edgcumbe | Earl of Mount Edgcumbe; 1917–1944 | Succeeded by Kenelm Edgcumbe |
