= Selle (Scheldt tributary) =

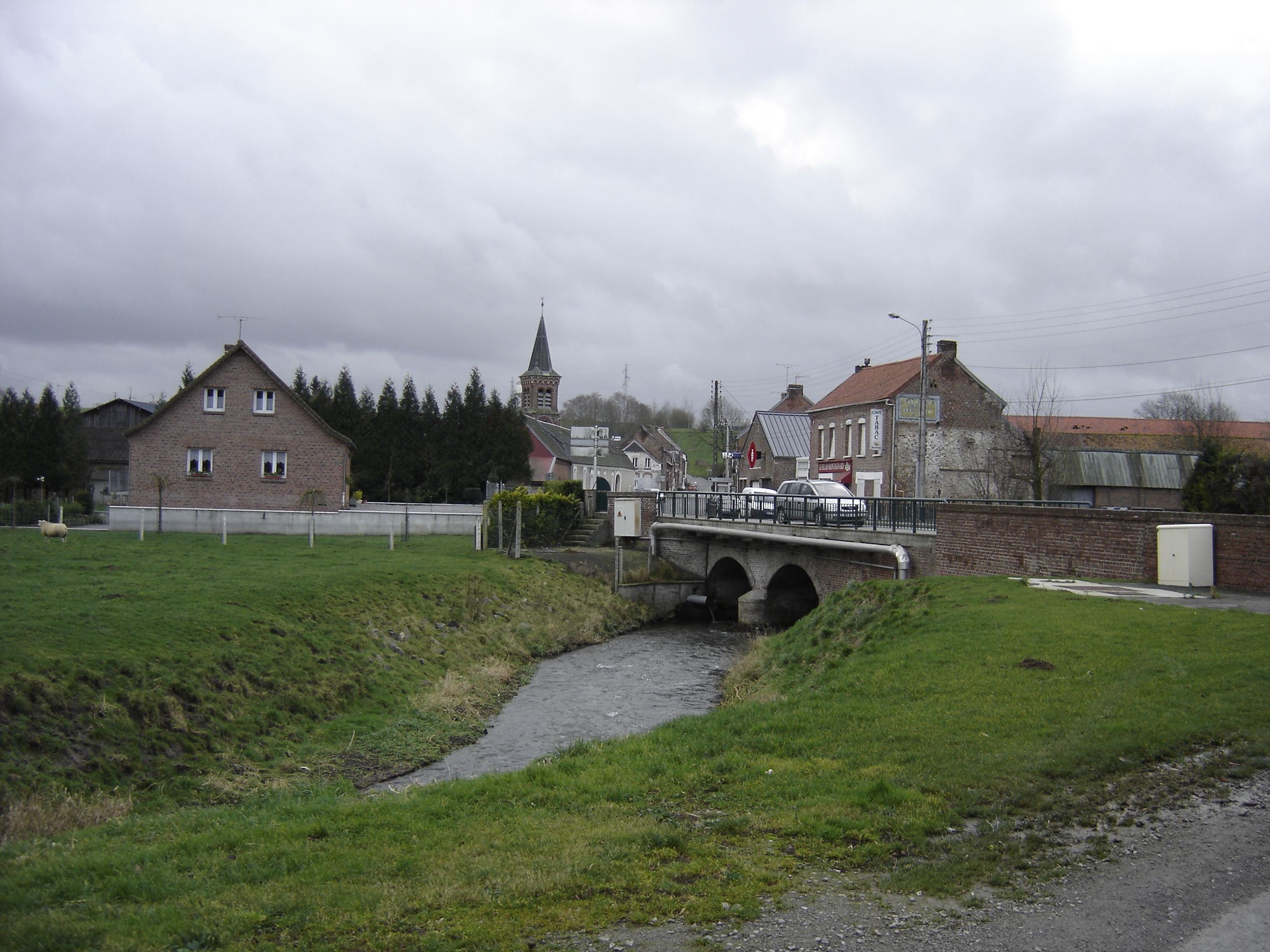

- Location within France Location within Hauts-de-France

Location
- Country: France

Physical characteristics
- Mouth: Scheldt
  - coordinates: 50°19′07″N 3°23′30″E
- Length: 46 km (29 mi)

Basin features
- Progression: Scheldt→ North Sea

The Selle is a river in the departments of Aisne and Nord, Hauts-de-France region, northern France. It flows into the Scheldt at Denain, southwest of Valenciennes, and approximately 20 km from the Belgian border. It is one of several rivers in France with the same name.

The river originates in the north of the département of Aisne, near Molain and flows northwest to its confluence with the Scheldt. It is 46 km (29 mi) long.

== History ==
In 57 BC, the Selle was the site of the Battle of the Sabis between Julius Caesar and the Nervians, Atrebates and Viromandui.

In the Middle Ages, the river was a boundary between the lands of Hainaut and Cambrai.

In World War I, during the Hundred Days Offensive of 1918, the German Army had taken up positions along the Selle near Le Cateau. General Rawlinson's Fourth Army spent two weeks preparing to assault these positions. The attack was launched on the night of 17 October when the river was crossed in foggy conditions and continued until the Germans were finally forced to retreat on 20 October. The action is known as the Battle of the Selle.
