= St Andrew's Church, Cawsand =

Church in Cornwall, England

St Andrew's Church
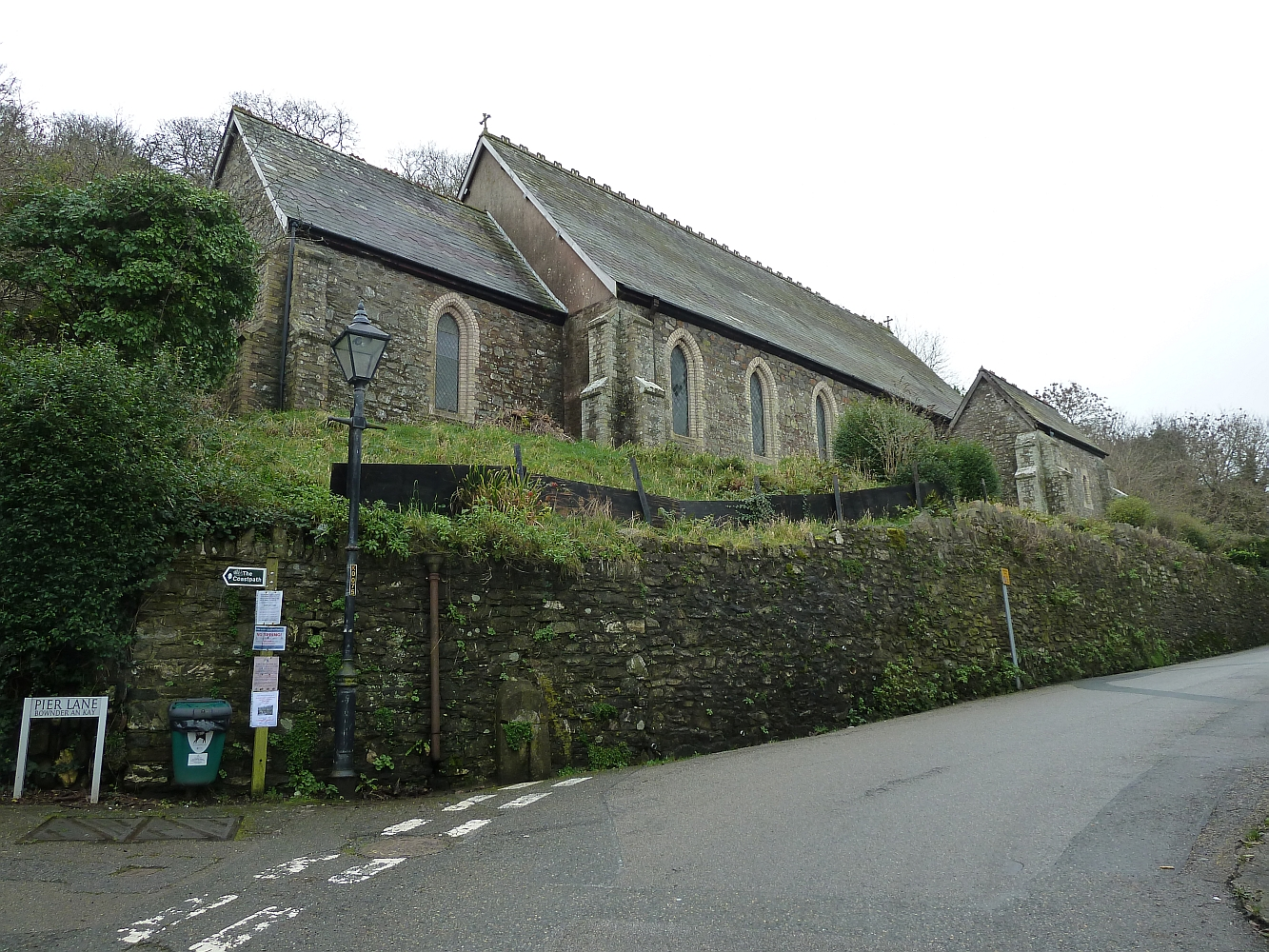
- St Andrew's Church

Religion
- Affiliation: Church of England
- Ecclesiastical or organizational status: Active

Location
- Location: Cawsand, Cornwall, England
- Interactive map of St Andrew's Church
- Coordinates: 50.3308°N 4.2026°W

Architecture
- Architect: Samuel Johns
- Type: Church
- Completed: 1878

Listed Building – Grade II
- Official name: Church of St Andrew
- Designated: 26 January 1987
- Reference no.: 1329167

St Andrew's Church is a Church of England church in Cawsand, Cornwall, England, UK. The church was built in 1877–78 and has been Grade II listed since 1987.

== History ==
St Andrew's was built as a chapel of ease to the parish church of St Germanus. Owing to the approximate distance of a mile between the parish church and the village, it had long been felt that residents would be better served by a new church, particularly the sick and elderly. Initially a former brewery building was hired in the village during 1876 for use as a place of worship, however when part of it was transformed into a school, efforts were made towards the construction of a purpose-built church. Kenelm William Edward Edgcumbe, the 6th Earl of Mount Edgcumbe, was a major benefactor of the proposal and he donated a plot of land for the church, the local stone used for its construction and a sum of money. Further financial donations were received from local residents, including Rev. R. Ley and prominent landowner Mr. C. S. Vallack, and the War Office.

The plans for the church were drawn up by Mr. Samuel Johns of Saltash and the foundation stone laid by the Earl of Mount Edgcumbe on 29 May 1877 in the presence of a large crowd. As part of the ceremony, a procession traveled from the temporary place of worship to the site of the new church, including members of the clergy, choirs of Maker and Rame churches and Sunday School children. The church was built by Mr. J. W. Hosking of Saltash, with Mr. Bryant of Devonport supplying the pitch pine work.

St Andrew's was opened on 28 May 1878. The opening services commenced with Holy Communion at 8:30am, followed by morning prayer around 11:45am and an evening service. The morning prayer was attended by the Bishop of Truro, Edward White Benson, who formally opened the church and preached. At the time of its opening, the church cost just under £1,000. Owing to limited funds, a chancel and vestry was not included as part of the original construction work, although Mr. Johns made future provision in his plans for them. The porch doubled as a temporary vestry until a permanent one could be built. The intended chancel was added in 1883, built by Mr. W. B. Carne of Cawsand and opened on 30 November of that year. A vestry was added in the early 20th century.

== Architecture ==
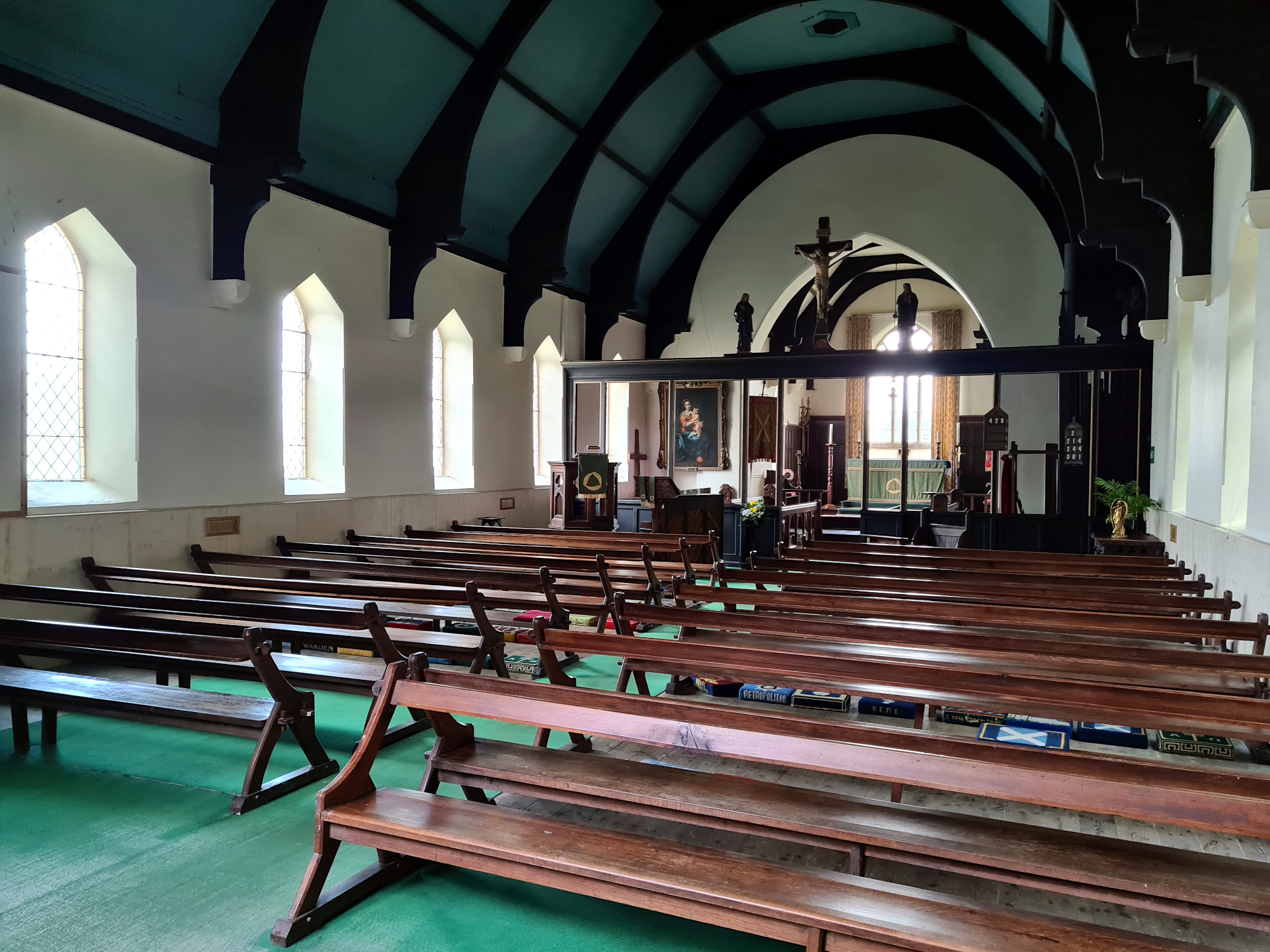
The interior of St Andrew's Church.

St Andrew's is built of sandstone rubble with white brick dressings and a slate roof in the Early English style. It was designed to accommodate 300 persons and is made up of a nave, chancel, north porch and south vestry. The church has a number of lancet-shaped windows and a bell turret sits on the west gable. All of the church's windows are lattice glazed and the chancel has a three-light window on its east side. The church fittings include a wooden pulpit and octagonal stone font.
