= William Edgcumbe, 4th Earl of Mount Edgcumbe =

British courtier and politician

The Right Honourable The Earl of Mount Edgcumbe GCVO PC DL
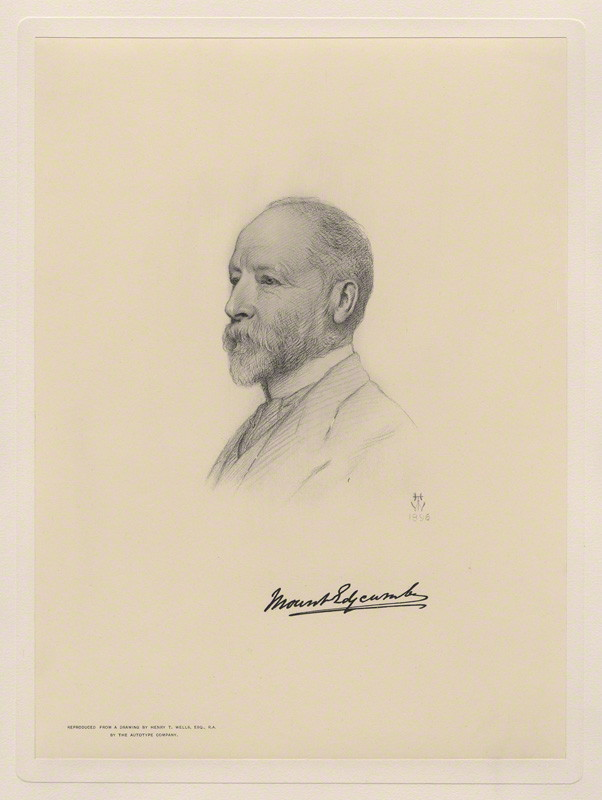

Lord Chamberlain of the Household
- In office 7 May 1879 – 21 April 1880
- Monarch: Victoria
- Prime Minister: The Earl of Beaconsfield
- Preceded by: The Marquess of Hertford
- Succeeded by: The Earl of Kenmare

Lord Steward of the Household
- In office 27 June 1885 – 28 January 1886
- Monarch: Victoria
- Prime Minister: The Marquess of Salisbury
- Preceded by: The Earl Sydney
- Succeeded by: The Earl Sydney
- In office 16 August 1886 – 11 August 1892
- Monarch: Victoria
- Prime Minister: The Marquess of Salisbury
- Preceded by: The Earl Sydney
- Succeeded by: The Marquess of Breadalbane

Personal details
- Born: 5 November 1833
- Died: 25 September 1917 (aged 83)
- Party: Conservative
- Spouse(s): (1) Lady Katherine Hamilton (c. 1838-1874) (2) Caroline Edgcumbe (d. 1909)
- Children: 4
- Parent(s): Ernest Edgcumbe, 3rd Earl of Mount Edgcumbe; Caroline Feilding

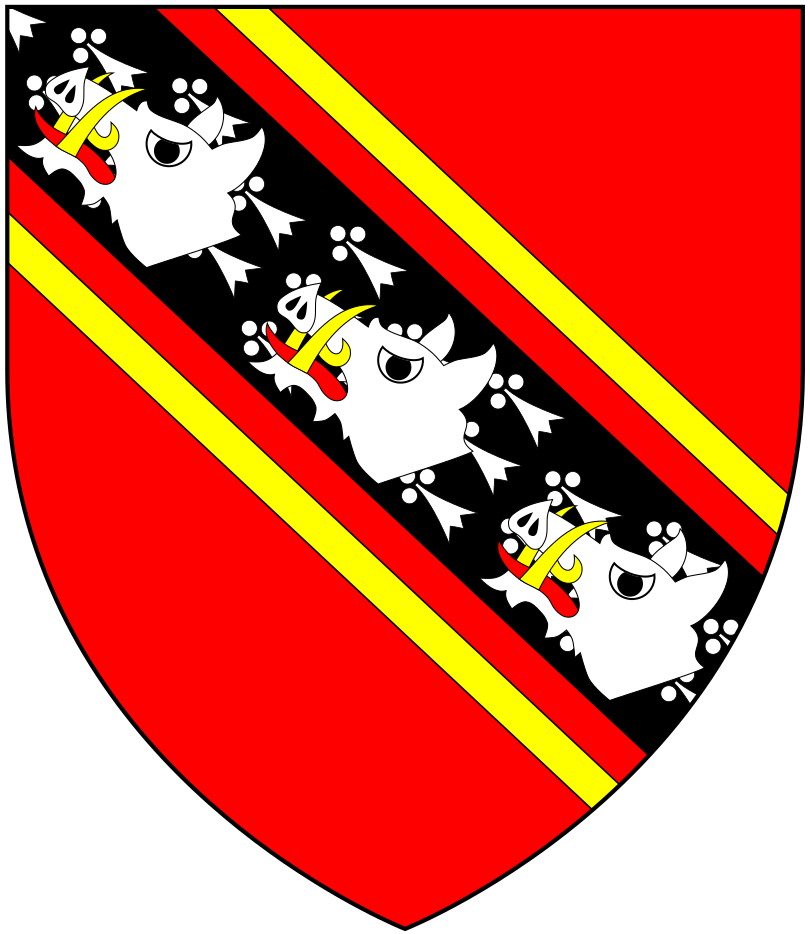
Arms of Edgcumbe, Earls of Mount Edgcumbe: Gules, on a bend ermines cotised or three boar's heads couped argent

William Henry Edgcumbe, 4th Earl of Mount Edgcumbe, GCVO, PC, DL (5 November 1833 – 25 September 1917), styled Viscount Valletort between 1839 and 1861, was a British courtier, Conservative politician, and Volunteer officer.

== Background ==
Edgcumbe was the son of Ernest Edgcumbe, 3rd Earl of Mount Edgcumbe, and Caroline Augusta, daughter of Rear-Admiral Charles Feilding.

== Career in Parliament and at Court ==
Edgcumbe was returned to Parliament for Plymouth in 1859, a seat he held until 1861 when he entered the House of Lords on the death of his father. In 1879 he sworn of the Privy Council and appointed Lord Chamberlain of the Household by the Earl of Beaconsfield, a post he held until the government fell in 1880. He later served under Lord Salisbury as Lord Steward of the Household between 1885 and 1886 and again between 1886 and 1892.

Edgcumbe was also an Aide-de-Camp to Queen Victoria from 1887 to 1897 and a Member of the Council to the Prince of Wales from 1901 to 1917 as well as Keeper of the Seal of the Duchy of Cornwall from 1907 to 1917. Between 1877 and 1917 he served as Lord-Lieutenant of Cornwall. He was also a Provincial Grand Master, an office held by the head of a Provincial Grand Lodge.

In early 1901 Lord Mount Edgcumbe was appointed by King Edward to lead a special diplomatic mission to announce the King's accession to the governments of Belgium, Bavaria, Italy, Württemberg, and the Netherlands. During his visit to the Belgian court in March 1901, King Leopold presented him with the Grand Cordon of the Order of Leopold.

== Military career ==
As Viscount Valletort he was commissioned as a Second lieutenant in the Cornwall Militia (the Duke of Cornwall's Rangers) on 24 April 1852; at the time the regiment was commanded by his father. He was subsequently promoted to Lieutenant on 3 June 1854 and Captain on 2 June 1855.

On 29 February 1860, during the enthusiasm for the Volunteer Movement, he raised the 16th (Stonehouse) Devonshire Rifle Volunteer Corps and served as its captain-commandant. Along with other units raised around Plymouth, the corps became part of the 2nd Administrative Battalion, Devonshire Rifle Volunteer Corps and Valletort was appointed Lieutenant-Colonel in command of the battalion on 8 August 1860. The battalion subsequently became the 2nd (Prince of Wales's) Volunteer Battalion, Devonshire Regiment (Valletort had been equerry to the Prince of Wales); he maintained his links with the battalion until his death in 1917.

On 9 February 1889, the Earl of Mount Edgcumbe was appointed Colonel in command of the Plymouth Brigade, consisting of the five Volunteer Battalions of the Devonshire Regiment and the two of the Duke of Cornwall's Light Infantry, which was charged with defending the Royal Navy's base at Plymouth in time of war. On 29 May 1889, Lord Mount Edgcumbe gave up command of the 2nd Volunteer Battalion, becoming its Honorary Colonel, though he continued to command the Plymouth Brigade until 1893. He was awarded the Volunteer Decoration, and remained Hon Colonel of his battalion when it became the 5th (Prince of Wales's) Battalion, Devonshire Regiment in the Territorial Force in 1908, and was president of the Cornwall Territorial Association.

== Family ==
Lord Mount Edgcumbe married firstly, Lady Katherine Hamilton, daughter of James Hamilton, 1st Duke of Abercorn, on 26 October 1858. They had four children:

- Lady Victoria Frederica Caroline Edgcumbe (1859–1920), married Lord Algernon Percy, son of Algernon Percy, 6th Duke of Northumberland and had issue.
- Lady Alberta Louise Florence Edgcumbe (1861– 25 March 1941), married Henry Lopes, 1st Baron Roborough and had issue.
- Lady Edith Hilaria Edgcumbe (1862– 3 April 1931), married John St Aubyn, 2nd Baron St Levan and had issue.
- Piers Alexander Hamilton Edgcumbe, 5th Earl of Edgcumbe (2 July 1865 – 18 April 1944).

After Lady Katherine's death in September 1874, Lord Mount Edgcumbe married secondly, his first cousin, Caroline Cecilia, daughter of George Edgcumbe and widow of Atholl Liddell, 3rd Earl of Ravensworth, on 21 April 1906. She died in February 1909. Lord Mount Edgcumbe died in September 1917, aged 83.

== Notes ==
Parliament of the United Kingdom
Preceded by James White; Sir Robert Collier	Member of Parliament for Plymouth; 1859–1861; With: Sir Robert Collier	Succeeded by Walter Morrison; Sir Robert Collier
Political offices
Preceded by The Marquess of Hertford	Lord Chamberlain of the Household; 1879–1880	Succeeded by The Earl of Kenmare
Preceded by The Earl Sydney	Lord Steward; 1885–1886	Succeeded by The Earl Sydney
Preceded by The Earl Sydney	Lord Steward; 1886–1892	Succeeded by The Marquess of Breadalbane
Honorary titles
Preceded by The Lord Vivian	Lord Lieutenant of Cornwall; 1877–1917	Succeeded by John Charles Williams
Vacant Title last held by The 2nd Earl of Mount Edgcumbe	Vice-Admiral of Cornwall; 1897–1917	Vacant
Peerage of Great Britain
Preceded by Ernest Edgcumbe	Earl of Mount Edgcumbe; 1861–1917	Succeeded by Piers Edgcumbe
