= Peamore, Exminster =

Historic estate in Devon, England

Coordinates: 50.6822°N 3.5352°W

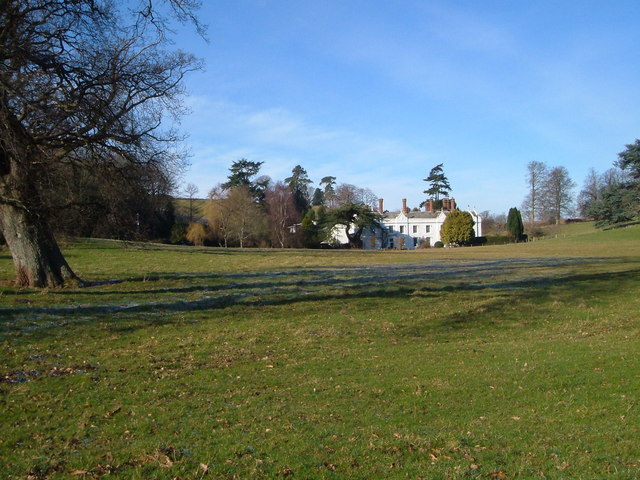
Peamore House in 2006

Peamore (anciently Pevmere, Peanmore, Peamont, etc.) is a historic country estate in the parish of Exminster, Devon, which is near the city of Exeter. In 1810 Peamore House was described as "one of the most pleasant seats in the neighbourhood of Exeter". The house was remodelled in the early 19th century and is now a grade II listed building, set in grade II listed parkland.

== History ==
=== Early ===
The Domesday Book of 1086 records PEVMERE as one of the 58 holdings of Ralph de Pomeroy, the first feudal baron of Berry Pomeroy, Devon, who was one of the Devon Domesday Book tenants-in-chief of King William the Conqueror. De Pomeroy's tenant was Roger FitzPayne. The estate later passed to the feudal barony of Lancaster.

According to the antiquary William Pole, writing in the early 17th century, Peanmore in the parish of Exminster was the inheritance of the family of Bolhay of Blackborough Bolhay. James de Bolhay was the last in the male line, whose daughter and heiress Amisia Bolhay was the wife of Sir John Cobham. Sir John Cobham (died 1335) inherited Blackborough and Peamore upon his marriage to Amisia Bolhay, heiress of Peamore. It remained in the Cobham family for several generations until the male line failed. Elizabeth Cobham was the heiress of Peamore but died childless. The heirs general of Elizabeth Cobham were Lord Hungerford, Hill of Spaxton and Bampfield of Poltimore. However the succession was claimed by the magnate Sir William Bonville (c. 1392/1393 – 1461) (later 1st Baron Bonville) of Shute, who "carried away this and the greatest part of the land". Upon the attainder of Bonville's eventual heir Henry Grey, 1st Duke of Suffolk (1517–1554), Paenmore escheated to the crown.

=== Tothill ===
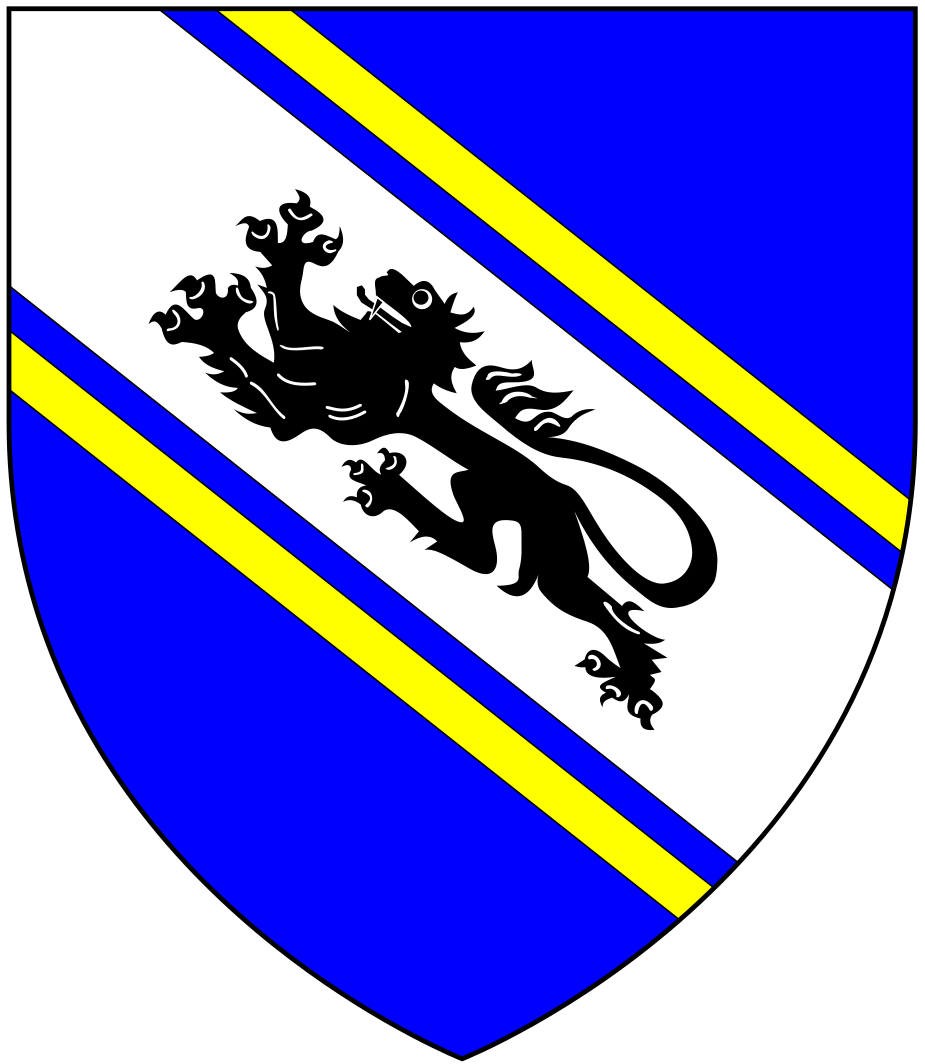
Arms of Tothill of Peamore (Note: Blazoned as Azure, on a bend argent cotised or a lion passant sable)

Jeffrey Tothill purchased the estate from the crown. He was Recorder of Exeter. He was the eldest son of William Tothill, an Alderman of the City of Exeter, by his wife Elizabeth Mathew, a daughter of Jeoffry Mathew, possibly of the ancient Welsh Mathew family, lords of Llandaff. One of Tothill's sisters, Elizabeth Tothill, married Thomas Stukley (c. 1525–1578), the third son of Sir Hugh Stukley (1496–1559) of Affeton in the parish of West Worlington, Devon, and head of an ancient gentry family, a Knight of the Body to King Henry VIII and Sheriff of Devon in 1545. He married twice: firstly to Joane Dillon, second daughter of Robert Dillon of Chimwell, lord of the manor of Bratton Fleming, Devon, by his wife Isabel Fortescue (16th century), by whom he had three sons: Henry, his eldest son and heir, Robert and Eleys. His second marriage in 1569 was to Elizabeth Fortescue, daughter of Bartholomew Fortescue (died 1557) of Filleigh, Devon, and widow of Lewis Hatch of Aller, South Molton. Jeffrey Tothill died childless.

Henry Tothill (1562–1640) was the eldest son by his father's first wife; he was Sheriff of Devon in 1623. He married Mary Sparke (died 1647), the daughter and heiress of Nicholas Sparke of Sowton, Devon. Henry Tothill was in residence at Peamore in the time of Pole (died 1635). Beneath the south window of St Martin's Church, Exminster, is a coffin-shaped stone with the inscription: Here lyeth the Body of Henry Tothill of Peamore Esq: who dyed the 9th day of December Ano 1640, ætatis suæ 78. Mary the only wife of ye aforesaid Henry and sole Daughter and Heire of Nicholas Sparke, Gent: lieth also here. He left two daughters as his co-heiresses:

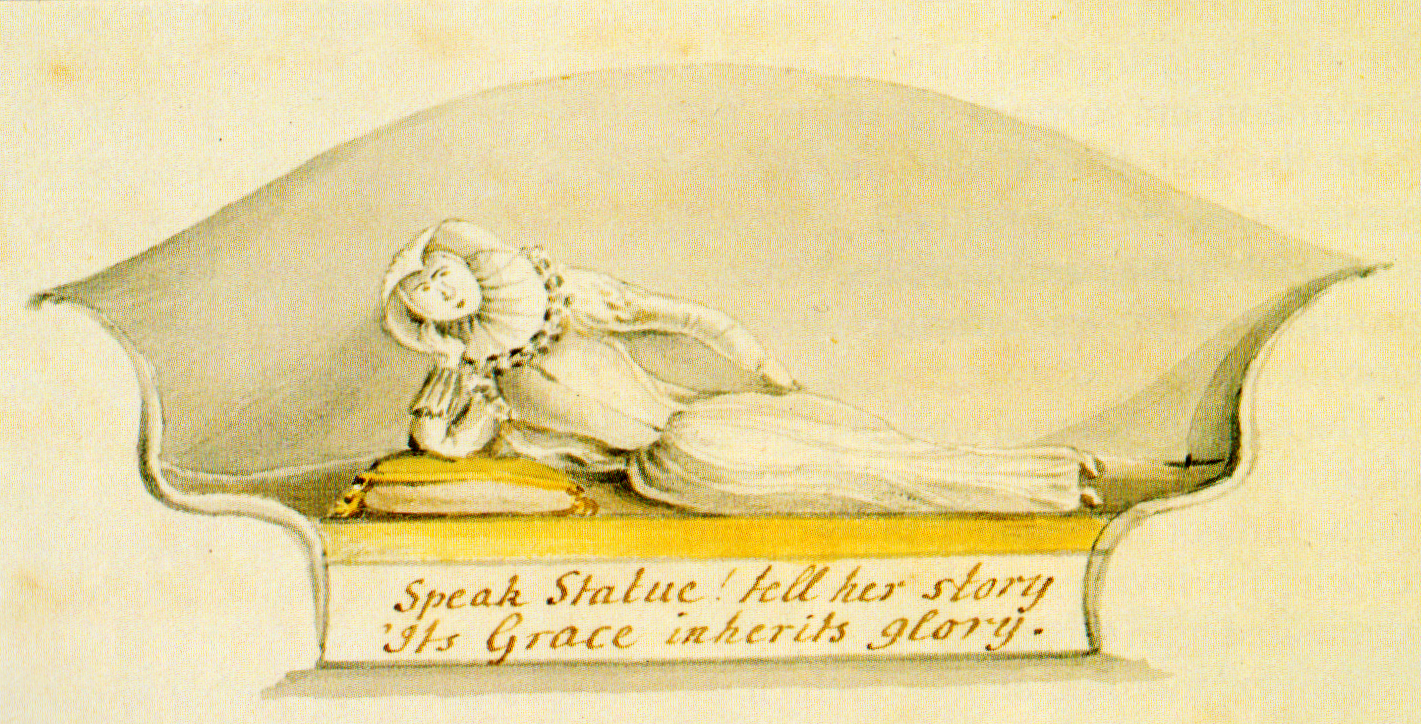
Grace Tothill's monument. 1794 watercolour by Swete.

Johanna Tothill was Henry's eldest daughter; she became the wife of Robert Northleigh (1582–1638) of Matford, Alphington. Northleigh's monument survives in Alphington Church. Henry's younger daughter Grace Tothill (1605–1623) married her second cousin William Tothill, grandson of John Tothill, a younger brother to her grandfather Geffery Tothill of Peamore. Grace died aged 18, having produced three children; a son Henry (living in 1640) and daughters Elizabeth and Ann. Grace Tothill's monument with her semi-recumbent effigy survives in St Martin's Church, Exminster.

=== Northleigh ===
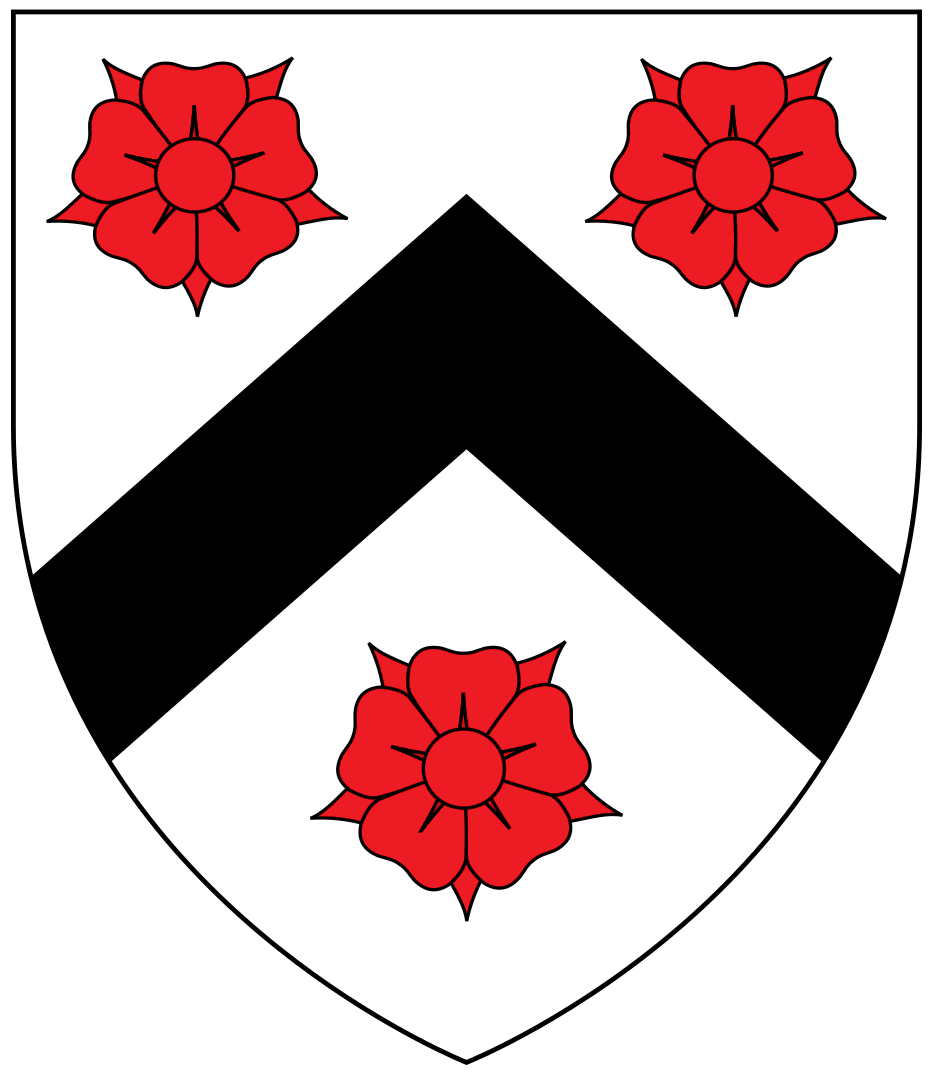
Arms of Northleigh of Northleigh (Note: Blazoned as Argent, a chevron sable between three roses gules)

Robert Northleigh of Matford (born 1581), married Johanna Tothill, heiress of Peamore. His family was seated at Matford, Alphington, near Exeter, and was a junior branch of the ancient Northleigh family of Northleigh in the parish of Inwardleigh, near Okehampton, Devon. The Northleigh family made Peamore their seat and abandoned their previous residence of Matford. In 1799 the Devon topographer Rev. John Swete visited the area and noted in his journal the ancient mansion of "Matford Dinham" had been an ancient seat of the Dinhams and Northleighs, and "a century ago of respectability among the mansions in the neighbourhood, is now on the verge of ruin and desolation, by an anticlimax it has pass'd from the hands of the gentleman to those of the farmer and is now become the habitation of a family or two of labourers, dilapidated and overspred with huge volumes of ivy, it will perhaps soon become untenantable".

Henry Northleigh (1612–1675) (eldest son and heir), who in 1639 married Lettice Yarde, the second surviving daughter of Edward Yarde (1583–1612) of Churston Ferrers, Devon.

Henry Northleigh (1643–1694) was the second and eldest-surviving son and heir of Peamore House; he was thrice MP for Okehampton and married Susanna Sparke, daughter of John Sparke, a dyer of Exeter. Susanna was the grand-daughter of Stephen Toller, haberdasher of Exeter, who in 1673 purchased Crediton Parks, the former park of the Bishops of Exeter, from Sir John Chichester of Hall, Bishop's Tawton. Susanna devised Crediton Parks to her daughter Susanna Northleigh, who devised it to her nephew John Tuckfield (c. 1719 – 1767) of Little Fulford, MP for Exeter, eldest son of her sister Elizabeth Northleigh by her husband Roger Tuckfield of London, Merchant.

Henry's son Stephen Northleigh (c. 1692 – ?1731) of Peamore was MP for Totnes from 1713 to 1722, which seat he obtained on the interest of his cousins the Yarde family. He married Margaret Davie, daughter of Sir William Davie, 4th Baronet (1662–1707), of Creedy House in Sandford, Devon. He died with no sons, leaving his daughter Mary Northleigh as heiress.

=== Hippisley-Coxe ===
In 1738, John Hippisley Coxe (1715–1769) of Ston Easton, Somerset, married Mary Northleigh (died 1773), heiress of Peamore. Hippisley Coxe was the builder of the Palladian mansion Ston Easton Park in Somerset.

John's third son Henry Hippisley Coxe (1748–1795) of Ston Easton Park, Somerset, was MP for Somerset from 1792 to 1795 and died childless. The Devon topographer Rev. John Swete visited the area in 1789 and made a sketch of Peamore, from which he made a watercolour painting in 1794. In 1789 he noted in his journal it was then the residence of Sam Strode, Esquire, (died 29 August 1795), lord of the manor and hundred of Crediton in 1790, who had purchased a life-interest lease from Henry Hippisley Coxe. In 1789 Swete noted concerning Peamore:

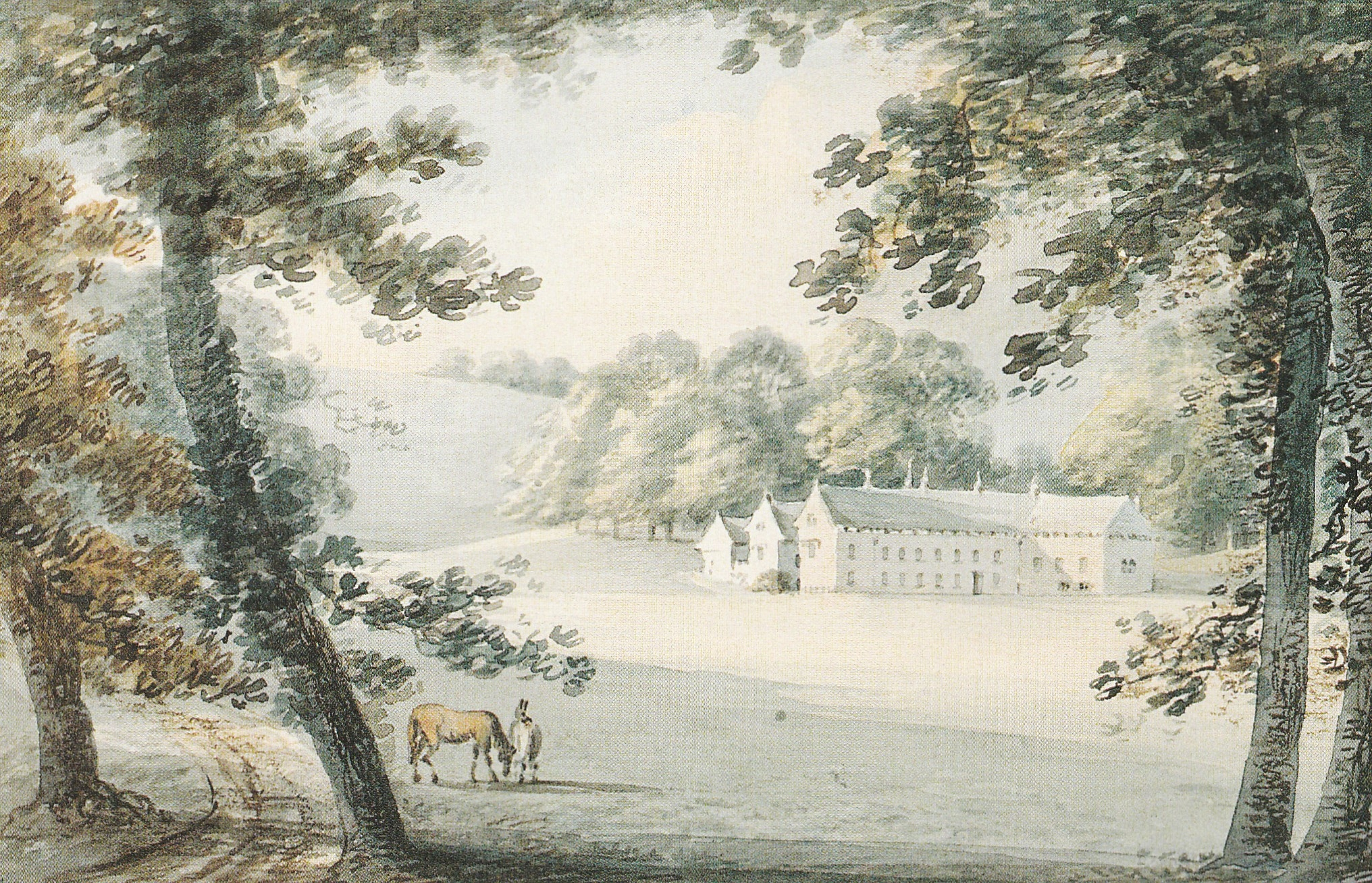
Peamore, view from southeast in 1794. Watercolour by John Swete

The foregoing sketch was taken near the road leading into the house just within the gate of entrance in the front of a noble and magnificent grove of elms. The building is here seen in its east and south aspect and though low carries with it a venerable look. But the chief beauty of Peamore lies in the undulating form of its grounds, rising and falling in the regular alternation of hills and dales; in its woods, groves and trees and in a quarry which surrounded by a thicket of high towering oaks, beech, etc., is one of the grandest and most romantic objects in the country.

Swete revisited the area in 1800 and noted in his journal that "Mr Coxe of Peamore" had planted a "crest of firs" on top of a local conical hill owned by him, a "conspicuous knoll of a conical shape", in the parish of Exminster or Alphington, which he compared to a similarly shaped hill at Killerton. Shortly thereafter "H.H. Coxe" sold Peamore to Samuel Kekewich (died 1822), who was the owner in 1810.

=== Kekewich ===
The family's unusual surname is thought to derive from Keckwick in Cheshire, which lies close to the Lancashire border. The first family member recorded, Sir Piers Kekewich, originated from Lancashire before moving to Shropshire. By the early 1500s, one branch of the family had moved again and had settled in east Cornwall. George Kekewich (1530–1582) of Catchfrench was MP in March 1553 for nearby Saltash and was then Sheriff of Cornwall in 1576. The family stayed in Cornwall for more than a century, before moving to west Devon.

The Kekewich arms are: Argent, two lions passant guardant in bend sable between two bendlets gules.

Samuel Kekewich (1767–1822) DCL was a barrister and Sheriff of Devon in 1805. He purchased Peamore from "H.H. Coxe". In the early 1800s, the house was remodelled. Samuel was the eldest son of William Kekewich (1736–1799) of Bowden House, Ashprington, Devon, who was a member of Royal Exchange Assurance. Samuel's son Samuel Trehawke Kekewich (1796–1873) also serves as Sheriff of Devon in 1835 before becoming a Deputy Lieutenant of Devon (DL).

The second Samuel's son Trehawke Kekewich (1823–1909) was the eldest son of the Deputy Lieutenant. His son, also named Trehawke Kekewich (1851–1932), was created a baronet in 1921 but had no surviving son so the title died with him. With both of his children already deceased, in later life he shared Peamore with his brother Robert Kekewich (1854–1914), when the Major-General retired from the army. After Robert had died, the third brother Lewis Pendarves Kekewich (1859–1947), JP., who had lived in Hove, Sussex, moved to Devon with his wife. Initially sharing a wing with his eldest brother, Lewis owned Peamore himself from 1932.

The last Kekewich to own Peamore was Sydney Kekewich (1893–1980), the fifth son of Lewis. The sole survivor of four brothers who served in the Great War, and with another who had died in infancy, Sydney had no interest in taking on the burdens of an estate late in life and promptly sold Peamore in 1948.

=== After World War II ===
After its sale in 1948, Peamore House was operating as a country hotel by 1952. In the 21st century, the house is residential once again but is now partitioned into four separate properties.
