= Matford, Alphington =

Historic estate in Devon, England

Matford (alias Matford Dinham) is an historic estate in the parish of Alphington, near Exeter, Devon. It should not be confused with Matford in the parish of Heavitree, almost immediately opposite on the other side of the River Exe.

The Devon Hotel occupies the site of the former Matford House at the junction of Old Matford Lane and the A379 Exeter By-Pass. Close by is Matford Bridge, the crossing point over the Matford Brook on the road between Alphington and Exminster.

== Descent ==
The descent of the estate of Matford-Dinham was as follows:

=== Dinham ===
Matford-Dinham was formerly a seat of the Dynham family, whose main seats were Nutwell and Hartland, on the south and north coasts of Devon respectively.

=== Hurding ===
Matford was later held by the Hurding family. The heiress of the family was Margery Hurding, who married Richard Northleigh. A mural monument survives in the south aisle of Alphington Church to Elizabeth Hurding (died 1 April 1680) daughter of John Hurding.

=== Northleigh ===
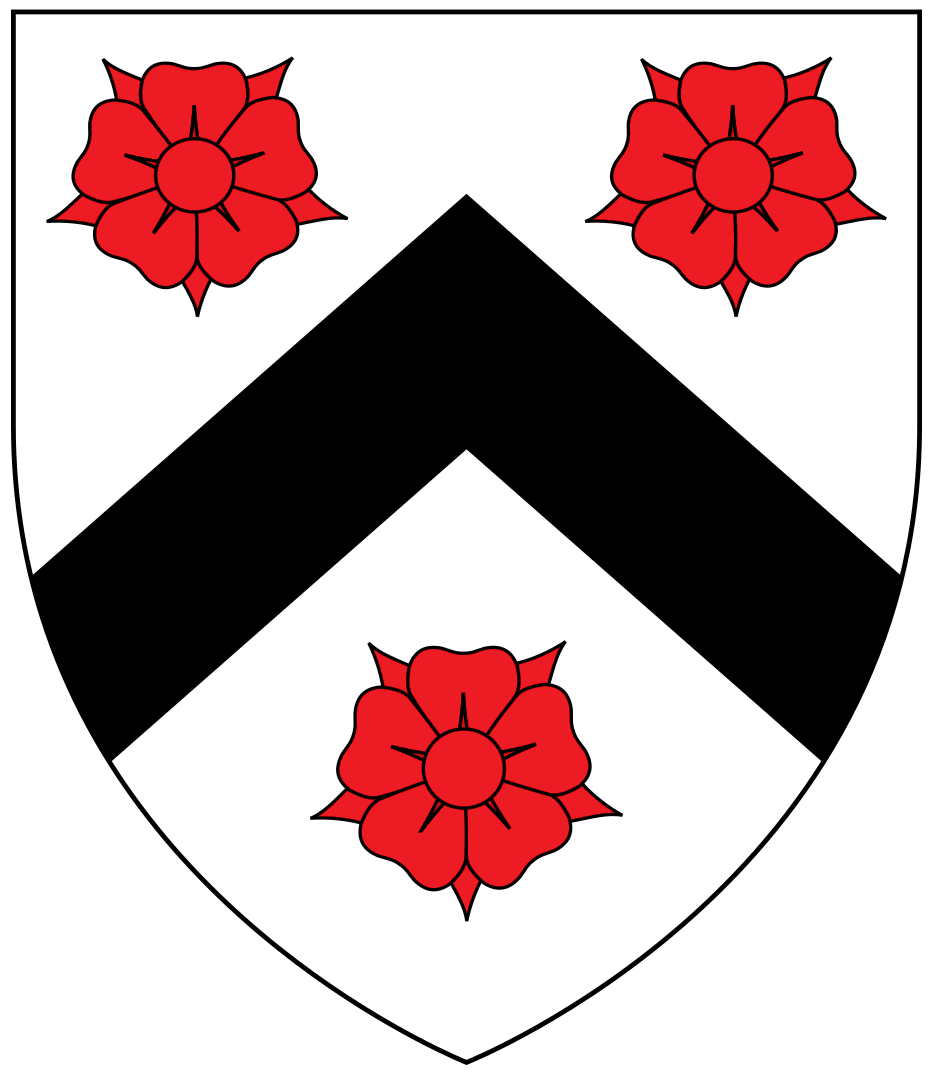
Arms of Northleigh of Northleigh in the parish of Inwardleigh, Devon: Argent, a chevron sable between three roses gules

- Richard Northleigh of Northleigh in the parish of Inwardleigh, near Okehampton, Devon, where the family had long been established, married Margery Hurding, heiress of Matford, by whom he had two sons: Raymond Northleigh, the eldest son, who inherited Northleigh, and continued the senior family line there, and Robert Northleigh, 2nd son, who was the founder of the branch of the family seated at Matford.
- Robert Northleigh (2nd son), who married Johanna Woode, daughter of John Woode of Harston, in the parish of Brixton.
- George Northleigh (d.1585) (son) who in 1583 married Alice Hockmore (d.1604), daughter of Gregory Hockmore (d.1571) of Buckland Baron, in the parish of Combe-in-Teignhead (formerly in Stoke-in Teignhead) by his wife Alice Cruce (d.1613), whose monument survives in Combe-in-Teignhead Church, a daughter and co-heiress of William Cruce.
- Robert Northleigh (1582-1639) (son), who married Johanna Tothill, one of the two daughters and co-heiresses of Henry Tothill (d.1641) of Peamore, Exminster, Sheriff of Devon in 1623. A memorial tablet dated 1639 in memory of Master Robert Northleigh of Matford Dinham, survives in Alphington Church. The Devon historian Tristram Risdon (d.1640), in his Survey of Devon, reported Matford to be "the mansion of a branch of the name of Norley, who married a co-heir of Tothill",
- Henry I Northleigh (1612-1675) (son), who in 1639 at Wolborough married Lettice Yard, a daughter of Edward Yard (1583-1612), lord of the manor of Churston Ferrers, Devon. His ledger stone survives in the floor of Alphington Church.
- Henry II Northleigh (1643-1694) (son) of Peamore House, thrice MP for Okehampton. he married Susanna Sparke, who survived him and remarried to his cousin Edward Yard (d.1735) of Churston Ferrers (great-nephew of Lettice Yard), MP for Totnes in 1695 . Henry's white marble mural monument survives in the north aisle of Alphington Church. At about this time the Northleighs abandoned Matford for nearby Peamore, after which it fell into ruin. In 1799 the Devon topographer Rev. John Swete (d.1821) visited the area and noted in his journal that the ancient mansion of Matford Dinham "a century ago of respectability among the mansions in the neighbourhood, is now on the verge of ruin and desolation, by an anticlimax it has pass'd from the hands of the gentleman to those of the farmer and is now become the habitation of a family or two of labourers, dilapidated and overspred with huge volumes of ivy, it will perhaps soon become untenantable".
- Stephen Northleigh (c.1692-?1731) (son), of Peamore, MP for Totnes 1713 - 1722, who married Margaret Davie, a daughter and co-heiress of Sir William Davie, 4th Baronet (1662-1707) of Creedy House in the parish of Sandford, Devon. He left no male progeny. His eldest daughter and eventual sole-heiress was Mary Northleigh who in 1739 married John Hippisley-Coxe (1715-1769), builder of the grand Somerset mansion Ston Easton Park. Their 3rd son was Henry Hippisley Coxe (1748-1795) of Ston Easton Park, Somerset, MP for Somerset (1792-5), who sold Matford to Sir Lawrence Vaughan Palk, 3rd Baronet (1793–1860) of Haldon House, Kenn, near Exeter.
