= North Somerset Yeomanry =

British Army cavalry regiment, 1798–1967

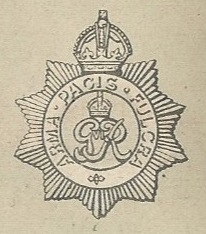
- Badge of the North Somerset Yeomanry
- Active: 1798–present
- Country: Kingdom of Great Britain (1798–1800); United Kingdom (1801–present)
- Branch: British Army
- Type: Yeomanry
- Size: Regiment
- Part of: 4th Yeomanry Brigade; 1st South Western Mounted Brigade; 4th Cavalry Brigade; Royal Corps of Signals; Royal Armoured Corps
- Engagements: Second Boer War; First World War France and Flanders 1914–18 Second World War Syria 1941 North Africa 1942–43 Sicily 1943 Italy 1943–44 North-West Europe 1944–45
- Battle honours: See battle honours below

Commanders
- Honorary Colonel: Brigadier Nigel C. Beacom, QVRM, TD
- Notable commanders: Thomas Strangways Horner; Sir William Miles, 1st Baronet; Richard Boyle, 9th Earl of Cork and Orrery; Charles Boyle, Viscount Dungarvan

The North Somerset Yeomanry was a part-time cavalry regiment of the British Army from 1798 to 1967. It maintained order in Somerset in the days before organised police forces, and supplied volunteers to fight in the Second Boer War. It served on the Western Front in the First World War. At the outbreak of the Second World War, it continued to operate in the mounted role and then as a specialist signals unit. Postwar it joined the Royal Armoured Corps and later became infantry. Its lineage today is maintained by 93 (North Somerset Yeomanry) Squadron 39 (Skinners) Signal Regiment.

== French Revolutionary and Napoleonic Wars ==
After Britain was drawn into the French Revolutionary Wars, the government of Prime Minister William Pitt the Younger proposed on 14 March 1794 that the counties should form Corps of Yeomanry Cavalry that could be called on by the King to defend the country against invasion or by the Lord Lieutenant to subdue any civil disorder within the county. A meeting of householders at Frome in Somerset on 2 May 1798 resolved to form a military association to defend the town. Its services were accepted on 2 June, and the Frome Troop of Cavalry was formed. A condition of service was that it should not be required to march more than 10 miles from the town. Other troops were formed at about the same time at Road, Wolverton, Mells, Beckington and Bath.

These independent troops all served until the Treaty of Amiens in 1802 when they were disbanded. The peace was short-lived and Britain declared war on France again in May 1803, beginning the Napoleonic Wars. The Frome Volunteers offered their services again in July and were accepted on 17 August as the Frome Selwood Troop of Volunteer Cavalry. The volunteers formed two troops, becoming a squadron in June 1804 when they united with the East Mendip Cavalry to become the Frome and East Mendip Regiment of Volunteer Cavalry. The regiment became the North Somerset Yeomanry in 1814 with six troops:

- Frome (two troops)
- Mells (two troops)
- Shepton
- Batcombe

Further troops were then added:

- Bath Cavalry, January 1814
- Ston Easton May 1815
- East Harptree (two troops) March 1817
- Keynsham, April 1817
- Bedminster, after 1817
- Bath Rifles, attached

== 19th Century ==
Although the Yeomanry generally declined in importance and numbers after the end of the French wars, the North Somerset unit continued at strength, and was regularly called out to suppress riots, in 1810, 1812 and 1817 at Bath, among miners at Radstock in 1813 and 1817, and weavers at Frome in 1816 and 1822. The actions of the Yeomanry in the 'Battle of Frome' in 1816 were discussed in Cobbett's Political Register.

In 1817 the regiment adopted a squadron organisation, with the Bath and Keynsham Troops forming the Right Squadron, the two Frome Troops the Frome or Right Centre Squadron, Ston Easton and East Harptree the Centre Squadron, the Mells Troops the Mells or Left Centre Squadron, while the Shepton and Batcombe Troops formed the Left Squadron. Two years later this organisation was abandoned in favour of two divisions: Bath Division:

- A Bath
- B Ston Easton
- C Keynsham
- D & E East Harptree
- F Bedminster

Frome Division:

- G & H Frome
- I & K Mells
- L Shepton
- M Batcombe

From 1820 to 1840 the regimental headquarters was at Mells Park, home of Thomas Strangways Horner, commanding officer (CO) from 1804 to 1839, when he was succeeded by his son. Another long-serving CO was Richard Boyle, 9th Earl of Cork and Orrery, Lt-Col Commandant 1867–93, who afterwards became Honorary Colonel, while his son, Viscount Dungarvan, took over as CO.

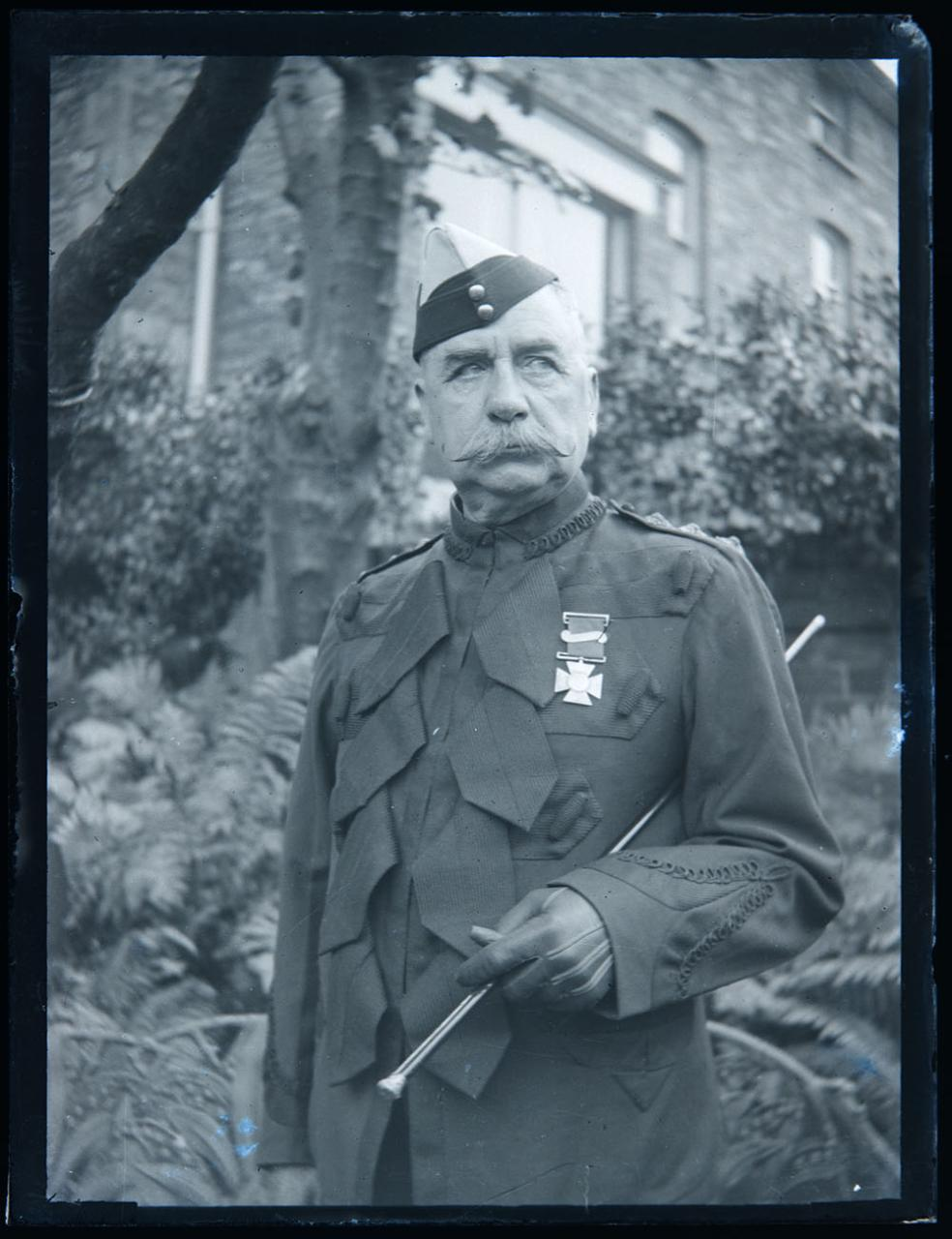
Officer of the North Somerset Yeomanry wearing a patrol jacket and forage cap, 1905 (c)

For some years the Keynsham Troop was without any officers, and although its members were keen and turned out promptly when required, their appearance and discipline had deteriorated to the point where they were known locally as 'The Cossacks'. It was disbanded in May 1842, but many of its members transferred to other troops of the regiment or joined the Gloucestershire Yeomanry Cavalry. In 1854 on the outbreak of the Crimean War, 342 out of 398 men in the regiment volunteered to serve in any part of the United Kingdom.

Following the Cardwell Reforms a mobilisation scheme began to appear in the Army List from December 1875. This assigned Yeomanry units to places in an order of battle of corps, divisions and brigades for the 'Active Army', even though these formations were entirely theoretical, with no staff or services assigned. The North Somerset Yeomanry was assigned as 'divisional troops' to 2nd Division of V Corps based at Warminster, alongside Regular Army and Militia units of infantry, artillery and engineers. This was never more than a paper organisation, but from April 1893 the Army List showed the Yeomanry regiments grouped into brigades for collective training. They were commanded by the senior regimental commanding officer (CO) but they did have a Regular Army Brigade major. The North Somerset Yeomanry together with the West Somerset Yeomanry formed the 4th Yeomanry Brigade, headquartered at Taunton. The Yeomanry brigades disappeared from the Army List after the Second Boer War.

== Imperial Yeomanry ==
The Yeomanry was not intended to serve overseas, but due to the string of defeats during Black Week in December 1899, the British government realised that it was going to need more troops than just the regular army to fight the Second Boer War. On 13 December, the decision to allow volunteer forces to serve in the field was made, and a Royal Warrant was issued on 24 December. This officially created the Imperial Yeomanry (IY). The Royal Warrant asked standing Yeomanry regiments to provide service companies of approximately 115 men each. In addition to this, many British citizens (usually mid-upper class) volunteered to join the new force.

The first contingent of recruits contained 550 officers, 10,371 men with 20 battalions of four companies. The first company left Southampton on 31 January 1900, bound for Cape Town, and the whole first contingent arrived in South Africa between February and April. Upon arrival, the IY battalions were sent throughout the zone of operations.

The North Somerset Yeomanry raised the 48th (North Somerset) Company for the IY, which arrived in South Africa on 23 March 1900 and served in 7th Battalion, IY. The company served until 1901, earning the regiment its first Battle honour: South Africa 1900–01. The regiment's CO, Viscount Dungarvan was already serving in South Africa in February 1900 and was seconded to the IY as second-in-command of the 22nd Battalion in 1901–02.

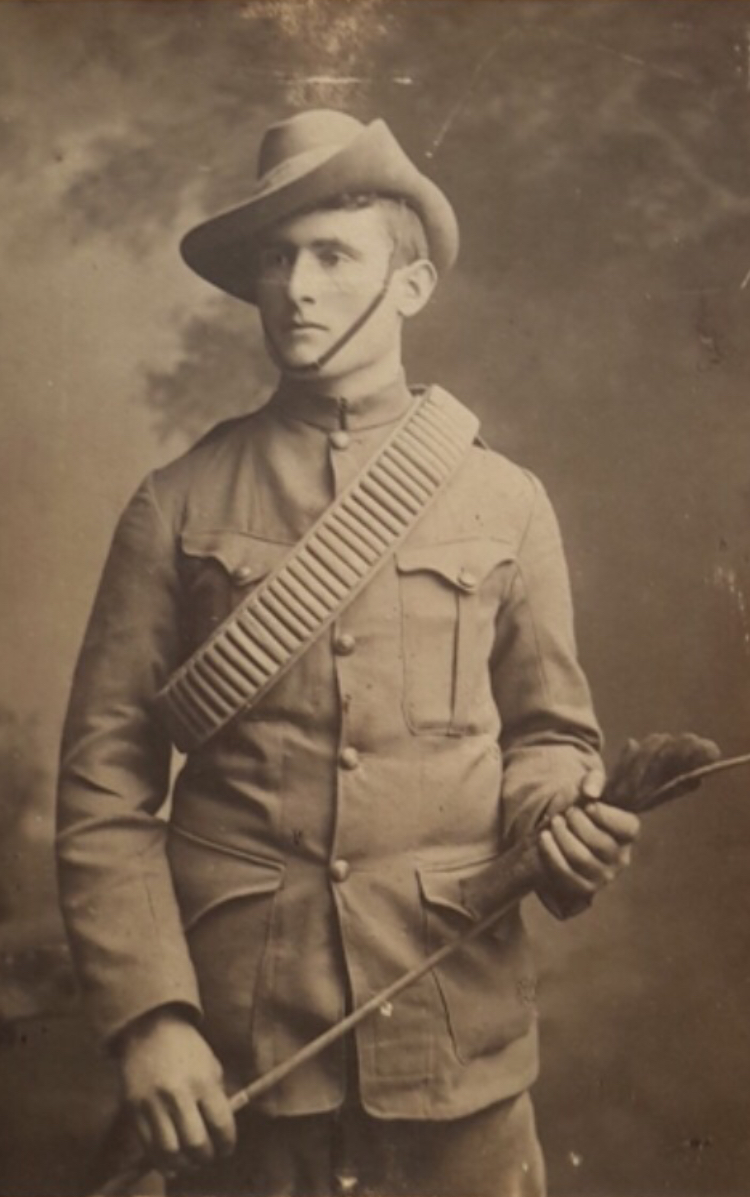
Trooper Edward J. Hall, North Somerset Yeomanry, in the Boer War 1900.

The Imperial Yeomanry were trained and equipped as mounted infantry. After the Boer War all Yeomanry regiments were termed Imperial Yeomanry until 1907, with an establishment of HQ and four squadrons with a machine gun section. In 1903 the North Somerset Imperial Yeomanry had HQ and A Squadron at Bath, B Squadron at Wells, and C Squadron at Bristol, while D Squadron was being formed.

== Territorial Force ==
The Imperial Yeomanry were subsumed into the new Territorial Force (TF) under the Haldane Reforms of 1908. The North Somerset Yeomanry (TF) was affiliated to the regular Dragoons and was organised as follows:

- RHQ at Shepton Mallet, moving to a new Upper Bristol Road drill hall, Bath in 1912
- A Squadron at Bath, with detachments at Bathampton, Farmborough, Frome, Mells and Road
- B Squadron at Weston-super-Mare, with detachments at Axbridge, Clevedon, Langford, and Nailsea
- C Squadron at Shepton Mallet, with detachments at Queen Camel, Ston Easton, Wells, Wincanton and Castle Cary
- D Squadron at Bristol, with detachments at Queen Charlton, Barrow Gurney and Keynsham

The North Somerset Yeomanry formed part of the TF's 1st South Western Mounted Brigade.

== First World War ==
=== Mobilisation ===
The North Somerset Yeomanry were mobilised on the outbreak of war on 4 August 1914 under the command of Lt-Col G.C. Glyn, DSO, who had taken command on 10 March. Under the Territorial and Reserve Forces Act 1907 (7 Edw. 7, c.9) which brought the TF into being, it was intended to be a home defence force for service during wartime and members could not be compelled to serve outside the country. However, after the outbreak of war, TF units were invited to volunteer for 'Imperial Service'. On 15 August 1914, the War Office issued instructions to separate those men who had signed up for Home Service only, and form these into reserve units. On 31 August, the formation of a reserve or 2nd Line unit was authorised for each 1st Line unit where 60 per cent or more of the men had volunteered for Overseas Service. The titles of these 2nd Line units would be the same as the original, but distinguished by a '2/' prefix. In this way duplicate battalions, brigades and divisions were created, mirroring those TF formations being sent overseas. Later, a 3rd Line was formed to act as a reserve, providing trained replacements for the 1st and 2nd Line regiments.

=== 1/1st North Somerset Yeomanry ===
The 1st Line regiment mobilised at Bath in August 1914 as part of the 1st South Western Mounted Brigade. In October 1914 it moved to Sussex with the brigade, but left it shortly afterwards. It landed in France on 3 November and joined the 6th Cavalry Brigade, 3rd Cavalry Division, on 13 November, replacing the 10th Hussars who moved to the newly formed 8th Cavalry Brigade As such, it was one of only six yeomanry regiments to be posted to a regular cavalry division in the war. (Note: The other five were: Bedfordshire Yeomanry in 1st Cavalry Division; Queen's Own Oxfordshire Hussars in 2nd Cavalry Division; Leicestershire Yeomanry in 3rd Cavalry Division; Essex Yeomanry also in 3rd Cavalry Division.; Queen's Own Yorkshire Dragoons in 4th Cavalry Division)

Trench warfare meant there was little scope for cavalry operations. Nevertheless, in 1915 the brigade and division took part in the Second Battle of Ypres (Battle of Frezenberg Ridge, 11–13 May) and the Battle of Loos (26–28 September). 1916 saw no notable actions, but in 1917 the division saw action in the Battle of Arras (First Battle of the Scarpe, 9–12 April). At other times, the regiment served in the trenches as part of a dismounted regiment under the command of the brigade commander.

The regiment left 6th Cavalry Brigade on 10 March 1918. Originally it was slated to become a cyclist unit, then to form a machine gun battalion with the Leicestershire Yeomanry. The German spring offensive forestalled this plan, and the regiment was remounted and returned to the Cavalry Corps. From April 1918 it was split up with a squadron joining each regiment in 6th Cavalry Brigade (3rd Dragoon Guards, 1st Dragoons and 10th Hussars).

=== 2/1st North Somerset Yeomanry ===
The 2nd Line regiment was formed in 1914 and in January 1915 it joined 2/1st South Western Mounted Brigade. In May it was in the Calne area, it moved in September to the Canterbury area and to the Colchester area in March 1916. On 31 March 1916, the remaining Mounted Brigades were ordered to be numbered in a single sequence; the brigade became the 15th Mounted Brigade and joined 4th Mounted Division.

In July 1916, the regiment was converted to a cyclist unit in 6th Cyclist Brigade, 2nd Cyclist Division (4th Mounted Division redesignated). In November 1916 the 2nd Cyclist Division was broken up and the regiment was merged with the 2/1st Royal Wiltshire Yeomanry to form 10th (Wiltshire and North Somerset) Yeomanry Cyclist Regiment in 4th Cyclist Brigade in the Ipswich area. In March 1917 it resumed its identity as 2/1st North Somerset Yeomanry, still in 4th Cyclist Brigade at Ipswich. In July it was at Wivenhoe and in November at Walton-on-the-Naze. Early in 1918, the regiment moved to Ireland with 4th Cyclist Brigade and was stationed in Dublin; there was no further change before the end of the war. The regiment was disbanded on 21 June 1919 in Dublin, and the remaining personnel formed an improvised trench mortar battery.

=== 3/1st North Somerset Yeomanry ===
The 3rd Line regiment was formed in 1915 and in the summer it was affiliated to a Reserve Cavalry Regiment at Tidworth. In the summer of 1916 it was affiliated to the 11th Reserve Cavalry Regiment, also at Tidworth. Early in 1917 it was absorbed in the 6th Reserve Cavalry Regiment, still at Tidworth.

== Between the wars ==
The regiment reformed in the TF on 7 February 1920. Postwar, a commission was set up to consider the shape of the Territorial Force (Territorial Army from 1 October 1921). The experience of the First World War made it clear that there was a surplus of cavalry. The commission decided that only the 14 most senior regiments were to be retained as cavalry (though the Lovat Scouts and the Scottish Horse were also to remain mounted as "scouts"). Eight regiments were converted to Armoured Car Companies of the Royal Tank Corps (RTC), one was reduced to a battery in another regiment, one was absorbed into a local infantry battalion, one became a signals regiment and two were disbanded. The remaining 25 regiments were converted to artillery brigades (Note: The basic organic unit of the Royal Artillery was, and is, the Battery. When grouped together they formed brigades, in the same way that infantry battalions or cavalry regiments were grouped together in brigades. At the outbreak of the First World War, a field artillery brigade of headquarters (4 officers, 37 other ranks), three batteries (5 and 193 each), and a brigade ammunition column (4 and 154) had a total strength just under 800 so was broadly comparable to an infantry battalion (just over 1,000) or a cavalry regiment (about 550). Like an infantry battalion, an artillery brigade was usually commanded by a Lieutenant-Colonel. Artillery brigades were redesignated as regiments in 1938.) of the Royal Field Artillery between 1920 and 1922. As the 11th most senior regiment in the order of precedence, the regiment was retained as horsed cavalry.

== Second World War ==
=== Palestine and Syria ===
The regiment was still mounted at the outbreak of the Second World War. On 15 November 1939, it joined the newly formed 4th Cavalry Brigade in 1st Cavalry Division. It departed the United Kingdom in January 1940, transited across France, and arrived in Palestine at the end of the month where it served as a garrison force under British Forces, Palestine and Trans-Jordan, to relieve Regular units. From 20 March 1941 the regiment was in 5th Cavalry Brigade. In June and July 1941, it took part in operations against the Vichy French in Syria, its members earning one Military Cross, two Military Medals, and six Mentions in Dispatches.

The intention had been to convert 1st Cavalry Division into an armoured division, but there were insufficient tanks and instructors in Middle East Forces to carry this out. Finally, on 1 August 1941, the division was converted into the 10th Armoured Division and the North Somerset Yeomanry was transferred to the Royal Armoured Corps in September, but all the tanks arriving in the Middle East were urgently required for Western Desert Campaign and there were none to spare for the Yeomanry. The regiment remained in Syria with 5th Cavalry Brigade until December 1941 when it returned to Palestine.

On 10 February 1942 the CO, Lt-Col H.E. Morton, was notified that the NSY was to convert to the Air Formation Signals (AFS) role. On 'Black Friday', 13 February, the regiment lost its last horse and proceeded to the Royal Corps of Signals (RCS) Base Depot, where it was retrained. The regiment formally transferred to the RCS as 4th Air Formation Signals (North Somerset Yeomanry) on 21 March 1942. The Yeomanry in general have been accused of being blinkered over their mechanisation. Morton objected that the high educational standard of his men meant that they should be 'used to better purpose', which ignored the high standards required for the technically demanding new role envisaged for the regiment. Several of his officers requested transfers to other arms and there were complaints about being converted into the 'Somerset Latrine Inspectors'. To maintain esprit de corps only the minimum numbers of RCS officers and NCOs were brought into the regiment: amongst the officers only Morton and the adjutant were replaced, Lt-Col V.W. Hawkins, RCS, taking over as CO.

=== 4th Air Formation Signals (North Somerset Yeomanry) ===
In 1938 the War Office and Air Ministry had agreed that the Army would provide all communications (except wireless) for the Royal Air Force (RAF) deployed overseas. The units concerned were termed 'Air Formation Signals' (AFS), and their number expanded rapidly as the Second World War progressed. Ideally there would be one AFS regiment assigned to each RAF Group or higher formation, but the fluid nature of air operations in the Middle and Far East theatres led to difficulty in meeting this target from Royal Signals resources, which was why the North Somerset Yeomanry was converted to the role. The regiment absorbed 4th AFS, which was already supporting the RAF in the theatre, and subsequently provided signal support (telephone and telegraph landlines, and despatch riders) for the Desert Air Force (DAF) in the highly mobile fighting that characterised the Western Desert Campaign.

In 1942 the DAF's two fighter wing HQs could leapfrog forwards in the advance, and they were split into several flying wings of two squadrons, each with its own landing ground (LG). Three flying wing LGs linked by land-line to their parent wing HQ formed a 'fighter airfields area'. As Eighth Army and the DAF advanced, new LGs could be rapidly established, the earlier ones being taken over by bomber squadrons in the rear. All this imposed a heavy burden on the AFS units maintaining communications as the fighting ebbed and flowed.

In 1943 a standardisation committee regularised the various HQ signal units, and AFS units were supposed to adopt the following organisation:

- 2 Line Troops
- 2 Construction Troops
- 2 Terminal Equipment Troops
- 3 Telegraph Operating Troops
- 2 Despatch Rider Troops
- 1 Technical Maintenance Troop
- 5 Wing Troops

4th AFS (NSY) served throughout the operations in the North African Campaign, including the Alamein and the advance into Tunisia, followed by the Allied invasion of Sicily and the greater part of the Italian Campaign. In August 1944 the unit was relieved by 8th AFS and the Yeomanry were sent home under the 'Python' scheme having served overseas for four and a half years. After home leave, the majority were then drafted to 14th AFS Regiment serving in North West Europe until the end of the war.

== Postwar ==
=== Royal Armoured Corps ===
After the war the regiment reverted to the Royal Armoured Corps and became the armoured regiment of 16th Airborne Division. It later merged with 44th/50th Royal Tank Regiment to become the North Somerset Yeomanry/44th Royal Tank Regiment on 31 October 1955, redesignated in April 1965 as the North Somerset and Bristol Yeomanry. When the TA was reduced into the Territorial and Army Volunteer Reserve in 1967, the regiment merged with the West Somerset Yeomanry and the Somerset TA battalion of the Somerset and Cornwall Light Infantry (Note: Although the Regular battalions of the Somerset Light Infantry and the Duke of Cornwall's Light Infantry merged to become the Somerset and Cornwall Light Infantry in 1959, the Territorial battalions kept their county names.) to become A Company (North Somerset and Bristol Yeomanry) in the combined Somerset Yeomanry and Light Infantry.

In 1969 the battalion was reduced to a cadre of eight men, but in 1971, two companies, A and B (Somerset Yeomanry Light Infantry) Companies, reformed in 6th Battalion The Light Infantry (Volunteers). A Company was subsequently disbanded and B Company evolved to become B (Somerset Light Infantry) Company, The Rifle Volunteers in 1999.

=== 39th Signal Regiment 'Skinners' ===
In 2000, the North Somerset Yeomanry designation was revived for the Headquarters Squadron of 39 (Skinners) Signal Regiment and, in 2008, that squadron, as 93 (North Somerset Yeomanry) Squadron, became the Regiment's Support Squadron.

== Uniforms ==
The original uniform of the Frome Troop was a light cavalry (Tarleton) helmet, a blue jacket with buff collar (and probably cuffs), and buff breeches. When the troop reformed in 1803 the helmet was retained, with a white feather Hackle, but the jacket was changed to scarlet with black facings and white breeches. By 1820 the regiment had adopted a uniform that conformed with the Regular Light Dragoons: the old Tarleton helmet was retained, but the short jacket or coatee was now blue with red facings and wide lapels forming a 'plastron' front, and the trousers were French Grey with a single red stripe. In 1842 a black Light Dragoon Shako replaced the helmet, but some time between 1851 and 1854 the regiment adopted a Heavy Dragoon helmet in white metal with a drooping black plume, possibly because the regimental adjutant at the time, Capt Francis Haviland, was a former officer in the 2nd Dragoon Guards (Queen's Bays). The jacket was now plain and single-breasted without the plastron front and worn with a white pouch belt over the left shoulder. In 1879 a new light dragoon tunic was taken into use, with Hussar lacing across the front, and white instead of red trouser stripes. A blue pillbox forage cap with a white band became the undress headgear.

A major change in the regiment's uniforms took place in 1888 when they were altered to conform with that of the 6th Dragoon Guards: white metal Dragoon helmet with white plume, blue Dragoon tunic with white collar, cuffs, piping, shoulder cords and Austrian knot on the sleeve, blue overalls or breeches with double white stripes. A blue cavalry cloak could be worn over this uniform, but by 1894 the regiment had adopted a red cloak (the Life Guards were the only other cavalry to wear this in red rather than blue). As late as 1898 the regiment's horse furniture retained the old steel collar chains instead of modern white head-ropes.

Some minor changes to this general pattern were adopted at the end of the 19th Century: a white foreign service pattern helmet was worn for a short period, and breeches were worn with blue puttees and ankle boots. Full dress was swept away when the Yeomanry Cavalry were converted into the Imperial Yeomanry in 1902. Instead, Khaki service dress was worn: 'frocks' (jackets) with four pockets and breeches, with a Slouch hat, the left side turned up, carrying a white-over-scarlet plume. The frock did retain a white trefoil knot on the sleeve until 1911. The peaked Service cap came into use in 1904 to replace the pillbox cap, but later took over from the slouch hat. However, a blue parade or substitute full dress was reintroduced by 1906 for ceremonial parades and 'walking out', with a blue frock and peaked cap with white band. From 1910 the Regular Army cavalry pattern was gradually introduced for service dress.

== Battle honours ==
The North Somerset Yeomanry was awarded the following battle honours (honours in bold are emblazoned on the guidon):

Second Boer War	**South Africa 1900–01**
First World War	**Ypres 1914** **'15**, **Frezenberg**, **Loos**, **Arras 1917**, **Scarpe 1917**, **Amiens**, **Hindenburg Line**, Beaurevoir, **Cambrai 1918**, **Pursuit to Mons**, **France and Flanders 1914–18**
Second World War	**Jebel Mazar**, **Syria 1941** Honorary Distinction: Badge of the Royal Corps of Signals with year-date "1942–45" and four scrolls: "North Africa", "Sicily", "Italy", "North-West Europe"

== Colonels ==
The following served as Colonel or Honorary Colonel of the unit:

- Thomas Strangways Horner of Mells Park, appointed 2 July 1804, resigned September 1839
- T.S. Fortescue Horner (his son), appointed September 1839, died 1843
- Sir William Miles, 1st Baronet, appointed 9 August 1843
- Richard Boyle, 9th Earl of Cork and Orrery, Lt-Col Commandant 1867–93, appointed Hon Col 27 May 1893, died 1904
- Field Marshal Frederick Roberts, 1st Earl Roberts, VC, appointed Hon Col 15 October 1904
- Lt-Col H.G. Spencer, TD, appointed Hon Col 3 June 1933

== Memorial ==
A memorial in the form of a wooden camp letter box with inscribed bronze panels listing 99 members of the North Somerset Yeomanry who died in the First World War, and 28 from the Second World War is preserved at the Bishops Hull Army Reserve Centre at Taunton Deane.

== Popular culture ==
The Hollywood motion picture War Horse (2011) featured a fictional depiction of the regiment in France in 1914.

== See also ==
- Imperial Yeomanry
- List of Yeomanry Regiments 1908
- Yeomanry
- Yeomanry order of precedence
- British yeomanry during the First World War
- Second line yeomanry regiments of the British Army

== Bibliography ==
- L. Barlow & R.J. Smith, The Uniforms of the British Yeomanry Force 1794–1914, 2: North Somerset Yeomanry, Aldershot: Robert Ogilby Trust/Tunbridge Wells: Midas Books, ca 1979, ISBN 0-85936-249-3.
- Maj A.F. Becke,History of the Great War: Order of Battle of Divisions, Part 1: The Regular British Divisions, London: HM Stationery Office, 1934/Uckfield: Naval & Military Press, 2007, ISBN 1-847347-38-X.
- Maj A.F. Becke,History of the Great War: Order of Battle of Divisions, Part 2a: The Territorial Force Mounted Divisions and the 1st-Line Territorial Force Divisions (42–56), London: HM Stationery Office, 1935/Uckfield: Naval & Military Press, 2007, ISBN 1-847347-39-8.
- Maj A.F. Becke,History of the Great War: Order of Battle of Divisions, Part 2b: The 2nd-Line Territorial Force Divisions (57th–69th), with the Home-Service Divisions (71st–73rd) and 74th and 75th Divisions, London: HM Stationery Office, 1937/Uckfield: Naval & Military Press, 2007, ISBN 1-847347-39-8.
- Bellis, Malcolm A. (1994). Regiments of the British Army 1939–1945 (Armour & Infantry). London: Military Press International. ISBN 0-85420-999-9.
- Burke's Peerage, Baronetage and Knightage, 100th Edn, London, 1953.
- Col John K. Dunlop, The Development of the British Army 1899–1914, London: Methuen, 1938.
- J.B.M. Frederick, Lineage Book of British Land Forces 1660–1978, Vol I, Wakefield, Microform Academic, 1984, ISBN 1-85117-007-3.
- Gen Sir William Jackson, History of the Second World War, United Kingdom Military Series: The Mediterranean and Middle East, Vol VI: Victory in the Mediterranean, Part I|: June to October 1944, London: HMSO, 1987/Uckfield, Naval & Military Press, 2004, ISBN 1-845740-71-8.
- James, Brigadier E.A. (1978). British Regiments 1914–18. London: Samson Books Limited. ISBN 0-906304-03-2.
- Joslen, Lt-Col H.F. (1990) [1st. Pub. HMSO:1960]. Orders of Battle, Second World War, 1939–1945. London: London Stamp Exchange. ISBN 0-948130-03-2.
- Cliff Lord & Graham Watson, Royal Corps of Signals: Unit Histories of the Corps (1920–2001) and its Antecedents, Solihull: Helion, 2003, ISBN 1-874622-92-2.
- Mileham, Patrick (1994). The Yeomanry Regiments; 200 Years of Tradition. Edinburgh: Canongate Academic. ISBN 1-898410-36-4.
- Maj-Gen R.F.H. Nalder, The Royal Corps of Signals: A History of its Antecedents and Developments (Circa 1800–1955), London: Royal Signals Institution, 1958.
- Perry, F.W. (1993). Order of Battle of Divisions Part 5B. Indian Army Divisions. Newport: Ray Westlake Military Books. ISBN 1-871167-23-X.
- Maj-Gen I.S.O. Playfair, History of the Second World War, United Kingdom Military Series: The Mediterranean and Middle East, Vol I: The Early Successes against Italy (to May 1941), London: HM Stationery Office, 1954/Uckfield, Naval & Military Press, 2004, ISBN 1-845740-65-3.
- Maj-Gen I.S.O. Playfair, History of the Second World War, United Kingdom Military Series: The Mediterranean and Middle East, Vol III: (September 1941 to September 1942) British Fortunes reach their Lowest Ebb, London: HM Stationery Office, 1960 /Uckfield, Naval & Military Press, 2004, ISBN 1-845740-67-X
- Rinaldi, Richard A (2008). Order of Battle of the British Army 1914. Ravi Rikhye. ISBN 978-0-97760728-0.
- Col H.C.B. Rogers, The Mounted Troops of the British Army 1066–1945, London: Seeley Service, 1959.
- Rule, John (1986). The Labouring Classes in Early Industrial England, 1750-1850. Routledge. ISBN 978-0582491724.
- Edward M. Spiers, The Army and Society 1815–1914, London: Longmans, 1980, ISBN 0-582-48565-7.
