= Henry Hippisley Coxe =

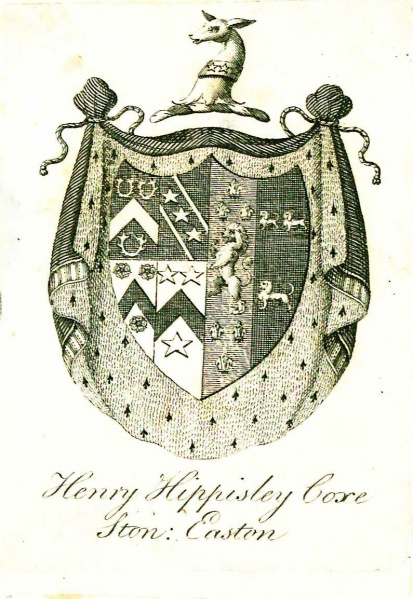
Bookplate of Henry Hippisley Coxe (1748-1795), showing arms of Coxe, of four quarters: 1st: Sable, a chevron between three attires of a stag fixed to the scalp argent (Coxe), 2nd: Sable, three mullets pierced in bend between two bendlets or (Hippisley), 3rd: Argent, a chevron sable between three roses gules (Northleigh) 4th: A chevron between three mullets (Davie); impaling (Azure semé of fleurs de lis or, a lion rampant argent (Pole) and Sable, three talbots passant argent (Horner)

Henry Hippisley Coxe (1748-1795) of Ston Easton Park, Somerset, was MP for Somerset (1792-5).

== Origins ==
He was the 3rd son of John Hippisley Coxe (1715-1769), builder of the mansion house Ston Easton Park, by his wife Mary Northleigh, daughter and eventual sole-heiress of Stephen Northleigh, MP, of Peamore, Exminster, and of Matford, Alphington, Devon.

== Inheritance ==
In 1786 he became heir to Ston Easton Park and other estates on the death of his elder brother Richard Hippisley Coxe (1742-1786), MP.

== Career ==
He served in the Somerset Militia, as Lieutenant in 1778, Captain in 1782 and Major in 1795. He was Sheriff of Somerset 1789-90 and MP for Somerset (1792-5).

He was President of the Bath and Wells Club from 1790 to 1791.

== Marriages ==
He married twice:

- Firstly in 1786 to Sarah Pole (d.1787), daughter of Reginald Pole of Stoke Damerel, Devon, without progeny.
- Secondly in 1790 to Elizabeth Anne Horner (d.1843), daughter of Thomas Horner of Mells Park, Somerset, without progeny. She was said to have been "of masculine character, having at some time or other expressed a wish to be made a justice of the peace". She survived her husband and remarried to Sir John Coxe Hippisley, 1st Baronet (1746-1825), who despite the similarity in name, was of distant, if any, relation to her former husband.

== Succession ==
He died without progeny on 1 August 1795, and left his estates to his widow Elizabeth Anne Horner for life, with remainder to his nephew Rev. Henry Hippisley, 2nd son of his sister Margaret Hippisley Coxe by her husband Rev. John Hippisley (1735-1822) of Lambourne Place, Berkshire.

== Sources ==
- Aspinall, Arthur, biography of Coxe, Henry Hippisley (1748-95), of Ston Easton, Somerset, published in The History of Parliament: the House of Commons 1790-1820, Thorne, R., (ed.), 1986
- Burke's Genealogical and Heraldic History of the Landed Gentry, 15th Edition, ed. Pirie-Gordon, H., London, 1937, pp. 1119–20, pedigree of Hippisley of Ston Easton
