= Ston Easton Park =

Grade I listed hotel in Mendip, UK

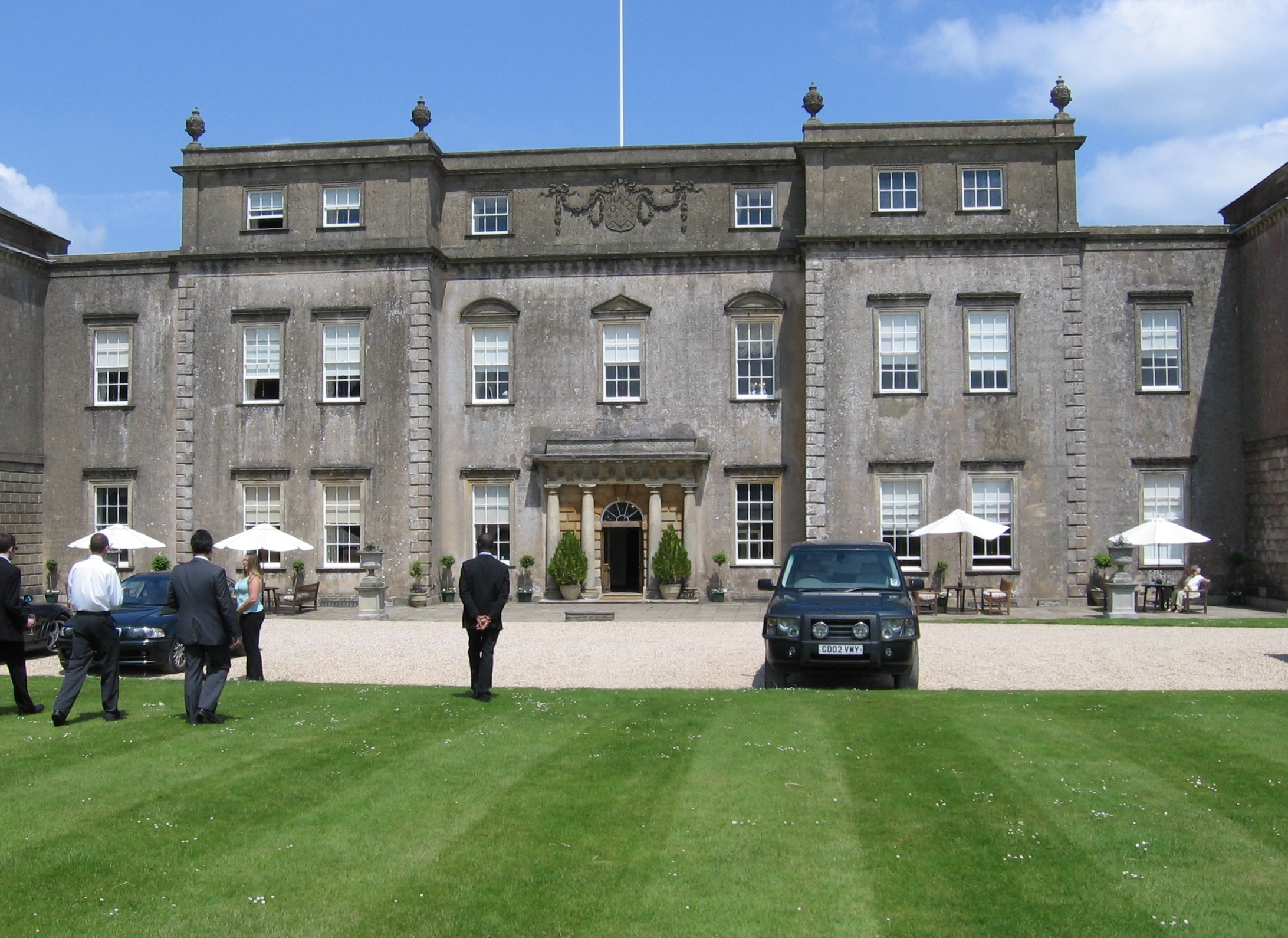
- The south front of the house

- Location within Somerset
- 51°17′6″N 2°32′37″W
- Location: Ston Easton, Somerset, England

History
- Built: 1750 to 1760

Listed Building – Grade I
- Official name: Ston Easton Park
- Designated: 21 September 1960
- Reference no.: 1345108

Listed Building – Grade II*
- Official name: Stables to Ston Easton Park
- Designated: 25 June 1986
- Reference no.: 1295250

National Register of Historic Parks and Gardens
- Official name: Ston Easton Park
- Designated: 1 June 1984
- Reference no.: 1000128

Ston Easton Park is an English country house built in the 18th century. It lies near the village of Ston Easton, Somerset. It is a Grade I listed building and the grounds are listed Grade II on the Register of Historic Parks and Gardens.

The current house was built around 1750 to 1760 on the site of a Tudor building. The architect may have been Thomas Paty. It was occupied by the descendants of the commissioning owner, John Hippisley-Coxe, until 1956. Since then owners including William Rees-Mogg and Peter Smedley have been involved in restoring the house, which is now in use as a private house for events.

The two-storey house has a symmetrical facade with projecting wings either side of the central doorway with a Tuscan portico. The interior of the stone house is decorated with extensive plaster mouldings to ceilings and fireplaces. The grounds and gardens were laid out by Humphry Repton, but have since been reduced in size.

== History ==
The Hippisley family had been lords of the manor of Ston Easton and surrounding areas since the Dissolution of the Monasteries in the mid-16th century. They acquired several local manors, some in association with William Rosewell. Preston Hippisley bequeathed the manor of Ston Easton to his daughter who married John Coxe of Leigh, Wiltshire, a Member of Parliament for Milborne Port. Her son John Hippisley-Coxe married an heiress, Mary Northliegh of Peamore in the parish of Exminster in Devon, and with his increased wealth commenced the building of the present mansion. They moved from the old manor house next to the parish church of St Mary The Virgin, Ston Easton to an ancient gabled Tudor house and started to convert it into a Palladian mansion with landscaped parkland and gardens.

The identity of the architect is not known, and although the design is reminiscent of the work of William Kent modern research tends to suggest Thomas Paty. It is also not known exactly when the house was built. John Hippisley-Coxe died in 1769 and his sons Richard and Henry further embellished the house and grounds. Henry Hippisley-Coxe employed Humphry Repton to landscape the park, including driveways and a viaduct similar to his plans for Endsleigh Cottage in Devon, although only part of this plan was actually created. Henry's widow Elizabeth Anne Horner, of Mells Manor, and her second husband Sir John Hippisley, 1st Baronet, further developed the grounds in about 1814. Elizabeth lived in the house until her death in 1843. The house was then left to Henry Hippisley of Lambourn, Henry's nephew, whose descendants lived there until the mid-20th century.

John Preston Hippisley inherited the house in 1956 on the death of his father Richard John Bayntun Hippisley and in order to settle the liability for inheritance tax he sold Ston Easton. Subsequently, maintenance of the building was poor and the fabric decayed. In 1958 a Preservation Order was obtained to stop the building being demolished and adding to the growing trend of destruction of country houses in 20th-century Britain. Restoration was undertaken by William Rees-Mogg who bought the building in 1964. Hotelier Peter Lawrence Smedley bought it from Rees-Mogg in February 1978 and carried out further restoration and converted it into a hotel. The house was sold again in 2001 to Von Essen Hotels.

In June 2020, as a result of the economic disruption caused by the COVID-19 pandemic, the hotel went into administration. The building reverted to the existing owners, who now rent it out for events and weddings. In 2022 Ston Easton Park was on the market for £6 million.

== Architecture ==
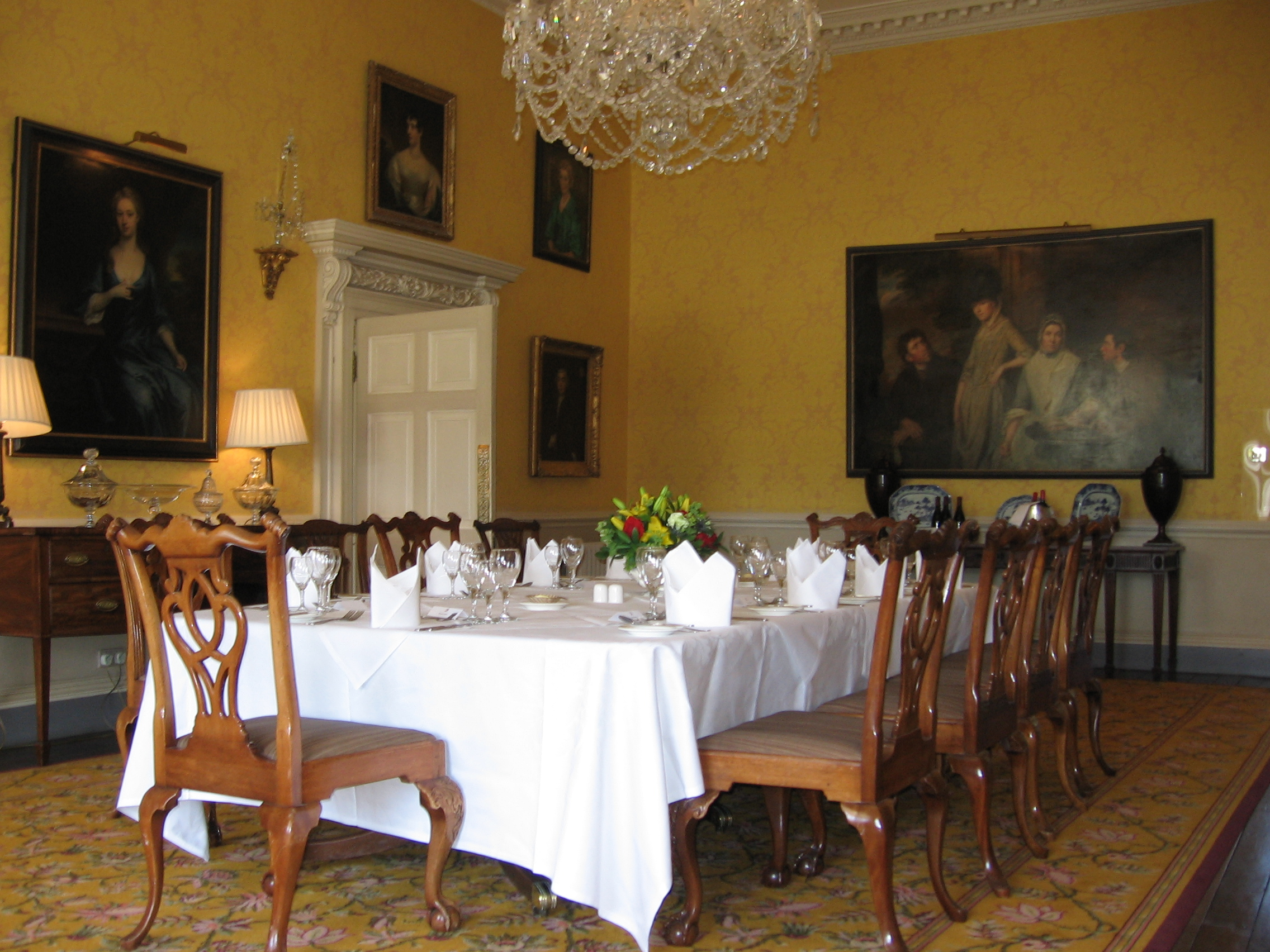
The Yellow Dining Room at Ston Easton Park

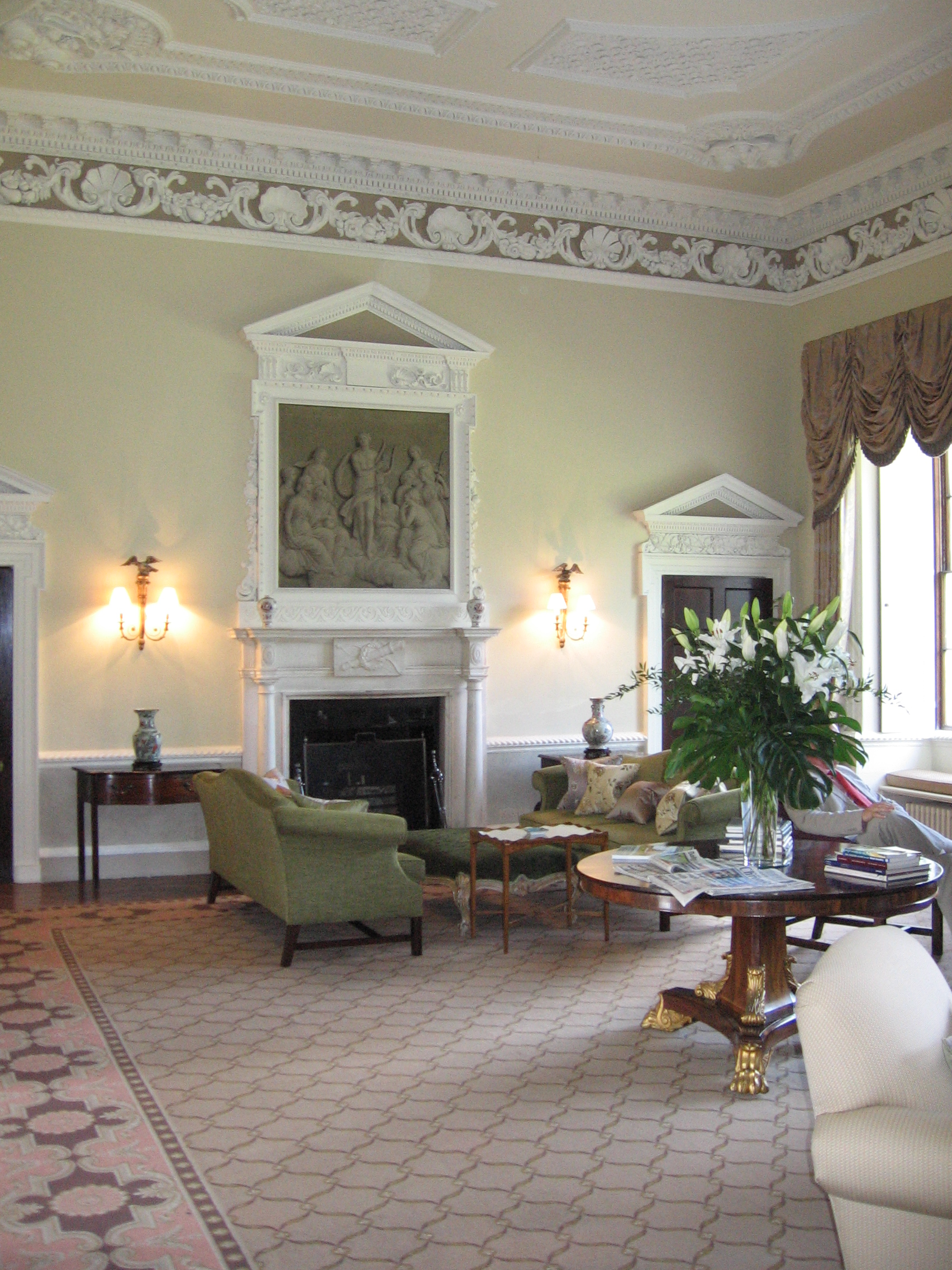
Reception Room at Ston Easton Park. The square panel over the fireplace is a trompe-l'œil painting.

The two-storey house has a symmetrical facade with projecting wings either side of the central doorway with a Tuscan portico. The ashlar is dressed with plaster and stone to highlight architectural features. The rear of the building is plainer than the front and is without the plaster dressing. The interior is decorated with plaster mouldings and engravings on the ceilings and fireplaces. The entrance hall leads via mahogany doors to the 32 feet (9.8 m) by 24 feet (7.3 m) saloon. Further highly decorated rooms include the dining room and library. An octagonal bathroom contains a plunge bath used by Lady Hippisley which is believed to have been designed by Sir John Soane or one of his pupils such as George Allen Underwood.

Ston Easton has gardens and landscaped grounds, laid out by Humphry Repton, of around 5 hectares (12 acres) and the remains of a park of between 30 acres (12 ha) and 87 hectares (210 acres). They include terraces and a pleasure ground in a steep sided valley. The grounds are listed Grade II on the Register of Historic Parks and Gardens. Some of the earlier parkland is now used for agriculture and the Farrington Golf and Country Club.

The single-storey stone stables, which are to the west of the main house, were built around 1769. They are in a similar architectural style to the house and include three carriage openings.

== Bibliography ==
- Bradbury, Oliver (2015). Sir John Soane's Influence on Architecture from 1791: A Continuing Legacy. Ashgate. ISBN 978-1-4724-0910-2.
- Cooke, Robert (1957). West Country Houses. Batsford.
- Dunning, Robert (2002). Somerset Families. Edco. ISBN 978-0-86183-446-4.
- Pirie-Gordon, H. (1937). Burke's genealogical and heraldic history of the landed gentry. Shaw Publishing. ASIN B00O31PNDG.
- Priest, Gordon (2003). The Paty Family: Makers of Eighteenth-Century Bristol. Redcliffe Press. ISBN 978-1-900178-54-9.
- Reid, Robert Douglas (1979). Some buildings of Mendip. The Mendip Society. ISBN 978-0-905459-16-5.
