= Charles Grene Ellicombe =

General Sir Charles Grene Ellicombe KCB
- Born: 3 August 1783; Alphington, Devon, England
- Died: 7 June 1871 (aged 87); Worthing, West Sussex, England
- Burial place: Christ Church, Worthing
- Military career
- Allegiance: United Kingdom
- Branch: British Army
- Rank: General
- Unit: Royal Engineers
- Commands: Colonel Commandant of Royal Engineers
- Conflicts: Peninsular War: Battle of Vitoria; Siege of San Sebastián; Battle of Nivelle; Battle of the Nive
- Awards: Knight Commander of the Order of the Bath

General Sir Charles Grene Ellicombe KCB (3 August 1783 – 7 June 1871) was an English General and a Royal Engineer, reaching the rank of Colonel Commandant within the Corps. He was created one of the first Companions of the Order of the Bath, and advanced to the honour of a Knight Commander of the Order of the Bath.

== Early life and education ==
In 1773, the Rev. William Ellicombe (1754–1831) married Hannah (1751–1821) (née Rous or Rouse). From 1780 until 1831, the Reverend was rector of Alphington, Devon, England. His father was Richard Ellicombe, incumbent of Stoke Canon. Richard's father, William Ellicombe, died 1730.

Charles Grene Ellicombe was born in his father's rectory in Alphington in 1783. He had seven brothers, two of whom died very young: William Rous Ellicombe (1774–1849), rector of Clyst St. George in Topsham, Richard Ellicombe (1775–1778), John Williams Ellicombe (1776–1799), ensign in the 40th Regiment, Hugh Myddelton Ellicombe (1777–1857), attorney at law, Richard Ellicombe (1780–1851), followed his father as rector of Alphington in 1831, Henry Thomas Ellicombe (1788–1789), and Henry Thomas Ellicombe (1790–1885), campanologist, curate of Bitton, and later succeeded his elder brother as rector of Clyst St. George; he changed the spelling of his surname circa 1836.

He received his early education at the grammar school at Chudleigh, and then attended the Royal Military Academy, Woolwich.

== Career ==
He obtained a commission as first lieutenant in the Corps of Royal Engineers on 1 July 1801. After a year and a half, during which he was employed on the military works and fortifications of Portsmouth under Major General Vyvyan Evelegh, he was sent to Ceylon and was one of the first batch of British engineers stationed there. He was promoted 2nd Captain on 1 July 1806, and returned to England at the end of 1807, in bad health.

After several months on leave, he was employed for a time as second engineer at Chatham, and afterwards as commanding engineer of the northern district of England. On 1 May 1811, he was promoted to the rank of First Captain, and shortly thereafter, joined the army under Field Marshal Wellington in the Peninsular War.

In January 1812, he was at the siege of Ciudad Rodrigo, where he was one of the directors of the attack, and accompanied Major General Sir John Vandeleur's 4th British Brigade. In March and April of the same year, he was at the last siege of Badajoz. For his services at this siege, he received the brevet rank of major on 27 April, having been recommended by Wellington. Subsequently, he was present in the retreat from Burgos and the crossing of the Ebro. The following year, he took part in the Battle of Vitoria, serving on the staff as brigade major. Shortly after, he was detailed for the Siege of San Sebastián, through the whole of which he acted as brigade major to the Royal Engineers. For his service, he was made a brevet lieutenant colonel on 21 September 1813, and under the order of 1 June 1814, was decorated with the gold medal.

He subsequently fought at the passage of the Bidassoa, and also at the Battle of Nivelle and Battle of the Nive in December 1813, concluding his war service by sharing in the campaign of 1814, particularly at the passage of the Adour, blockade of Bayonne, and repulse of the sortie from that fortress. At the cessation of hostilities, he joined the headquarters of the army at Toulouse, and in July he returned to England. Some 33 years afterwards, he was awarded for these distinguished services the war medal and five clasps for C'iudad Rodrigo, Badajoz, Vittoria, Nivelle, and Nive.

On 4 June 1815, he was created one of the first Companions of the Order of the Bath, and for the next six years, held an appointment as commanding engineer in southern England. In 1821, Captain Ellicombe was made Assistant Adjutant-General of the Royal Engineers, and as such, was on the staff of the Inspector-General of Fortifications at the Board of Ordnance in London. He was selected for the duty because of his well-known administrative ability and intimate acquaintance with the large range of complicated details connected with the military and scientific business of the Royal Engineers. He retained the appointment until December 1842. He was promoted to major-general in 1841, and rose to the rank of full general and colonel commandant of Royal Engineers. On 10 November 1862, Ellicombe was advanced to the honour of a Knight Commander of the Order of the Bath.

== Artwork ==
Ellicombe painted watercolours of the places he visited. Some of these include watercolour pen and brown ink entitled, "Fort Ecluse 7 June 1807", acquired by the British Museum; Shoreham and Malines Cathedral, Belgium, watercolour wash sketches; the 1823 watercolour, Kings College Chapel And Clare Hall; and the 1812 Bridge at Cabezon being prepared for demolition during Wellington's retreat from Burgos in October 1812.

== Personal life ==
Ellicombe married in 1822, Mary, a daughter of the Rev. Edmund Peach, rector of Cheam, Surrey. She died in 1860 without issue.

At retirement, Ellicombe settled at Worthing, where he died in 1871. He and his wife are both buried at Christ Church, Worthing.
