= Church of St Mary the Virgin, Ston Easton =

Church in Somerset, England

Church of St Mary the Virgin
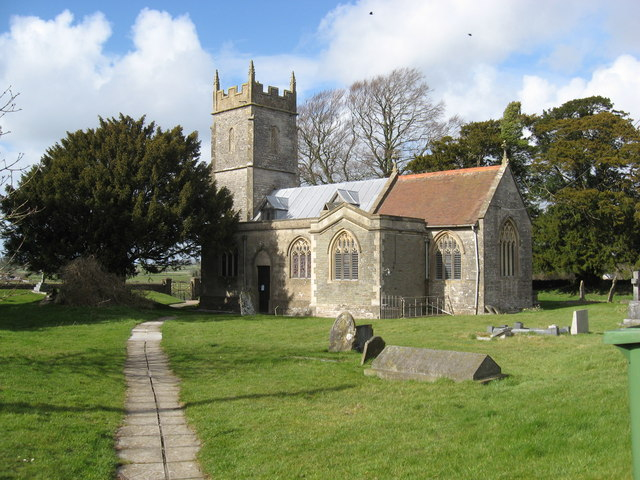

- Location within Somerset
- 51°16′44″N 2°32′27″W
- Location: Ston Easton, Somerset, England

Listed Building – Grade II*
- Official name: Church of St. Mary The Virgin
- Designated: 21 September 1960
- Reference no.: 1295301

The Anglican Church of St Mary the Virgin in Ston Easton, Somerset, England, is a Grade II* listed building dating from the 11th century, with a 15th-century embattled 3-stage west tower.

The most striking interior feature is the Norman chancel arch, with semi-circular head and colonettes. The pews, choir stalls, altar rails, pulpit, font and screen are all 19th century. There are several 18th and 19th century wall monuments particularly to the Hippisley Coxe family of Ston Easton Park, who have their own chapel at the east end of the north aisle.

The chancel was rebuilt in 1707 and the south aisle around 1800.

The church underwent significant rebuilding in the 19th century, by Arthur Blomfield, which included dismantling most of the building including the Norman arch, marking each stone and then rebuilding them in the same position.

The parish is part of the benefice of Chewton Mendip and the archdeanery of Wells.

== See also ==
- List of ecclesiastical parishes in the Diocese of Bath and Wells
