= Upper Bristol Road drill hall, Bath =

Military installation in Bath, Somerset, England

Upper Bristol Road drill hall
- Bath, Somerset
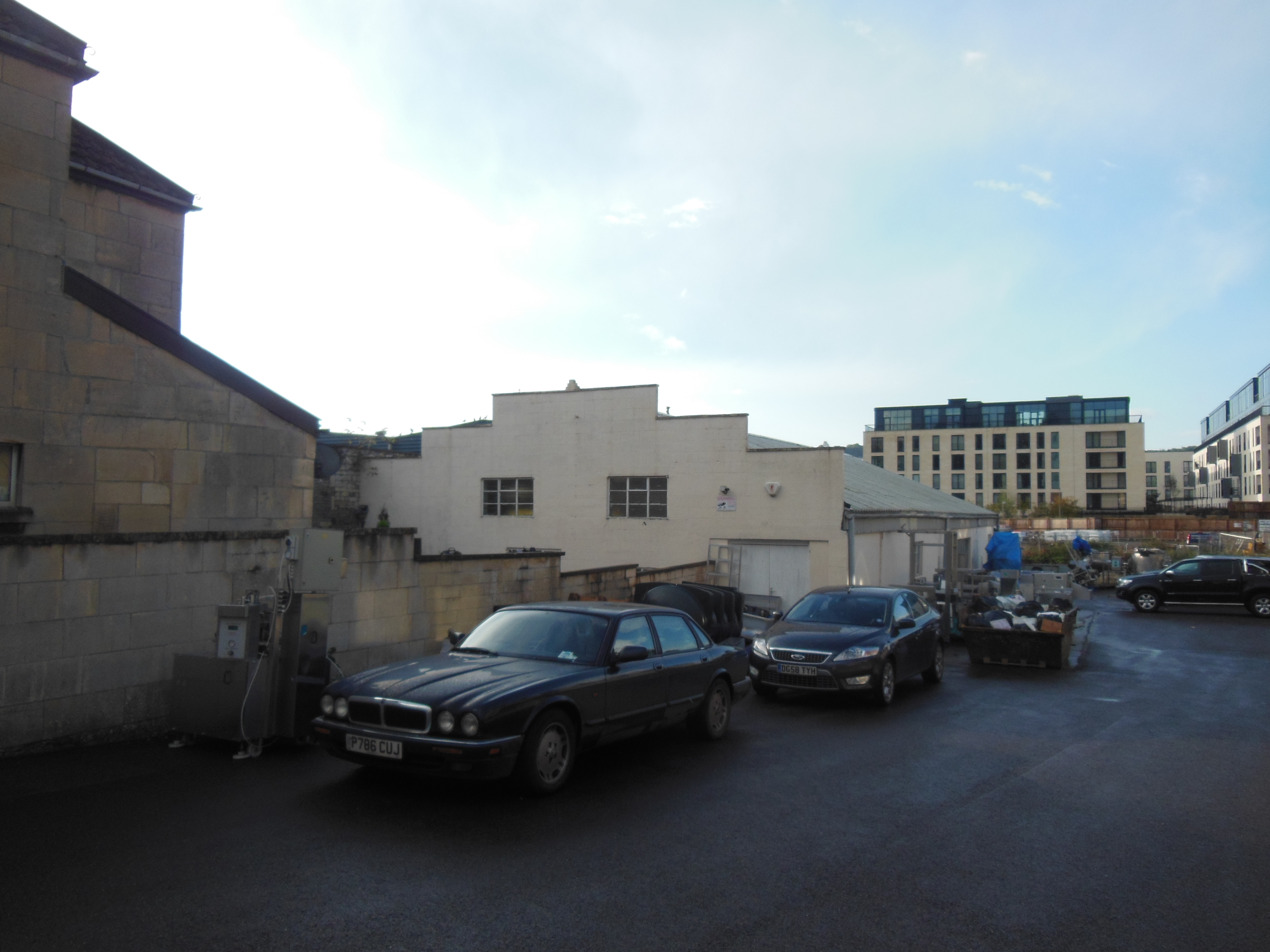
- The old drill hall at Upper Bristol Road

Site information
- Type: Drill hall

Location
- Location within Somerset
- Coordinates: 51.38412°N 2.37364°W

Site history
- Built: Late 19th century
- Built for: War Office
- In use: Late 19th century-?

The Upper Bristol Road drill hall is a former military installation in Bath, Somerset.

== History ==
The building, which was completed in the late 19th century, became the headquarters of the North Somerset Yeomanry in 1912. The regiment was mobilised at the drill hall in August 1914 before being deployed to the Western Front. The drill hall also served as the headquarters of the Wessex Divisional Royal Engineers during the First World War. It was used by a section of the 2nd South Western Mounted Brigade Field Ambulance Royal Army Medical Corps.
