= Exminster =

Village in Devon, England

Coordinates: 50.677568°N 3.494527°W

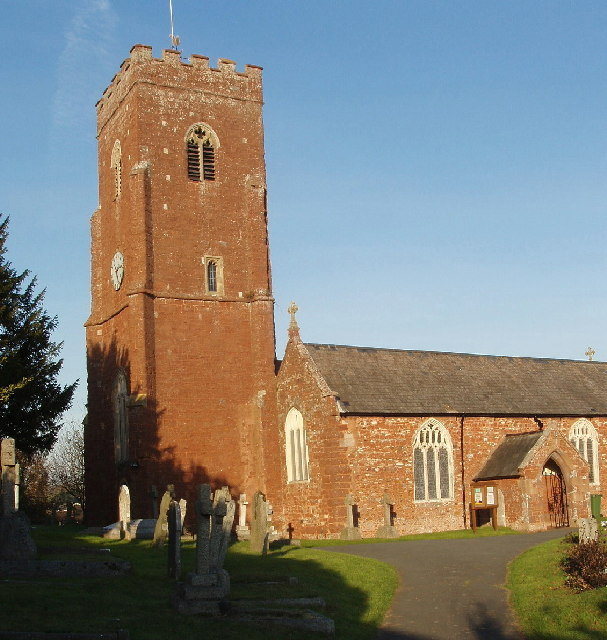
St Martin's Church, Exminster

Exminster is a village west of the Exeter ship canal and River Exe in Devon, England, 6 km (3.7 mi) south of Exeter, with a population of 4,379 at the 2021 census.

Exminster is an ancient village associated with a Saxon minster or religious community, founded here in the 8th century. and left by King Alfred the Great to his youngest son Aethelweard in his will of 889. In the 14th century, it was the seat of the Courtenay family, the Earls of Devon. William Courtenay, who was the Archbishop of Canterbury from 1381 to 1396, was born here.

Exminster is part of the electoral ward of Kenn Valley. Exminster Marshes, to the east of the village, are a major site for birds, especially migratory ones, including the rare cirl bunting.

== Landmarks ==
The present parish church of Saint Martin of Tours is a Grade I listed building and was built in the late 14th and 15th centuries in the Perpendicular style. It was heavily restored in 1841 and again in 1852. It has a large three-storied tower with a polygonal stair turret. Inside, the Peamore chapel has a plaster ceiling dated 1633, depicting the Twelve Apostles and the Four Evangelists, scenes of the Nativity, Christ carrying the cross and the Resurrection. There is also a notable monument to Otho Petre of Bowhay who died in 1607. The churchyard contains the war graves of eight British servicemen of World War I - the first and highest ranking being Major General Robert Kekewich - and three servicemen of World War II.

The football club is Exminster St Martins AFC. The village is intersected by the Berry Brook, a small stream that rises near Peamore and runs parallel to Days-Pottles Lane, before passing through Exminster and joining the River Exe at Turf Lock.

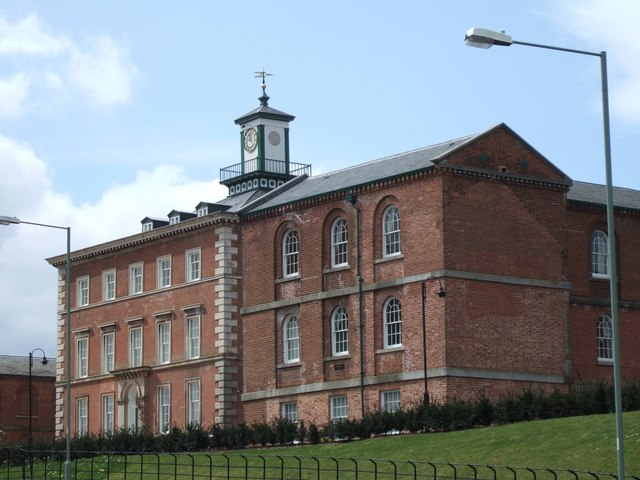
Part of Devington Park.

On a hill overlooking the Exe estuary at the north-west side of the village is the former Devon County Asylum (a "lunatic asylum") which was designed by Charles Fowler and opened in July 1845. It featured a central administration block with six radiating arms and had a capacity of around 800 beds. The hospital closed in the mid-1980s when it was known as Exminster Hospital. After years of neglect, the surrounding land was built upon for housing and the grade II listed hospital was converted to apartments and town houses; it is now known as Devington Park.

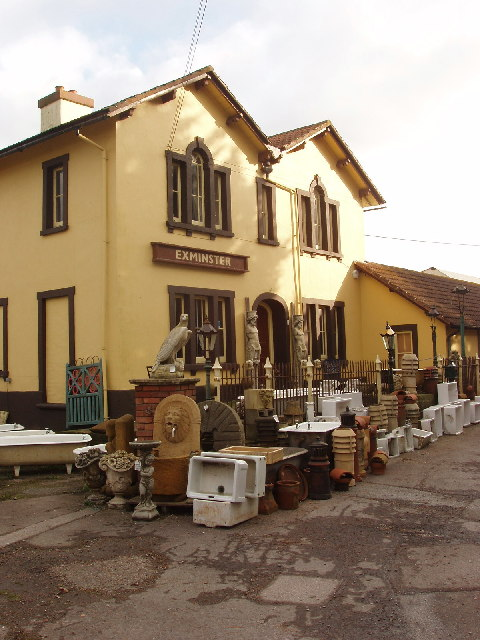
Exminster railway station, now a reclamation yard open to the public.

Exminster railway station was opened by George Hennet on behalf of the South Devon Railway in 1852. It closed to passenger traffic on 30 March 1964 and to goods traffic on 4 December 1967, but its distinctive building still stands next to the railway line. The signal box remained standing on the site until September 2006, was subsequently removed for preservation to Broadway, Worcestershire. although it has since been scrapped.

== Transport ==
The M5 was originally planned to demolish most of the north part of village, taking 25 houses and the Stowey Arms pub. On 27 March 1972 it was decided re-route the motorway at a cost of £1m, as a deep cutting would need to be dug through a hill. The new route was announced in mid-September 1972.

On Friday 27 May 1977, the final section of the M5 from Sandy Gate to Pearce's Hill, opened, being 3.5 miles (5.8km) by the Prime Minister, Jim Callaghan.

== Economy ==
Exminster's amenities include a surgery, pharmacy, a village shop, a convenience store, several estate agents, a golf course, a hairdresser, as well as a community facility (The Westbank) which incorporates a gym, an IT suite with web access, and daytime family and toddlers' groups. Exminster also has a primary school; several parks for children including a skate park; and three pubs – The Stowey Arms, The Royal Oak and The Swan's Nest. The Topsham and Exminster Brewery, which produces Ferryman Ale, is located at a former RAF GCI (Ground Controlled Interception) radar station in the midst of the Exminster Marshes RSPB reserve.

The Exeter Canal cycle path leads from Exminster into the centre of Exeter, giving commuters in the village a traffic-free route into the city.

== Historic estates ==
- Peamore, Exminster
- Bowhay, a seat of the Petre family, later the seat of Aaron Baker (1620–1683) the first President of the Madras Presidency (1652–1655).

== Notable residents ==
- The novelist Frances Mary Peard (1835–1923) was born here
- Phil Beer (born 1953) musician
