= Catchfrench =

Hamlet in Cornwall, England

Coordinates: 50.411°N 4.384°W

Catchfrench: Cornish: Chasfrank
- Location within Cornwall
- OS grid reference: SX307596
- Civil parish: St Germans
- Shire county: Cornwall
- Region: South West
- Country: England
- Sovereign state: United Kingdom
- Post town: TORPOINT
- Postcode district: PL12
- Dialling code: 01503
- Police: Devon and Cornwall
- Fire: Cornwall
- Ambulance: South Western
- UK Parliament: South East Cornwall

Catchfrench (Cornish: Chasfrank, meaning free hunting ground) is a hamlet in Cornwall, England. It is about 1.5 miles (2.4 km) north of Hessenford.

Catchfrench Manor is a late 18th-century house by Charles Rawlinson of Lostwithiel. It was built on part of the site of the old manor house. In the 20th century the south end of the house was demolished. The ruins of the 16th-century house are to the south.
