= Alphington, Devon =

Village in Devon, England

Coordinates: 50°42′N 3°32′W

Locator map of Alphington district ward in Exeter

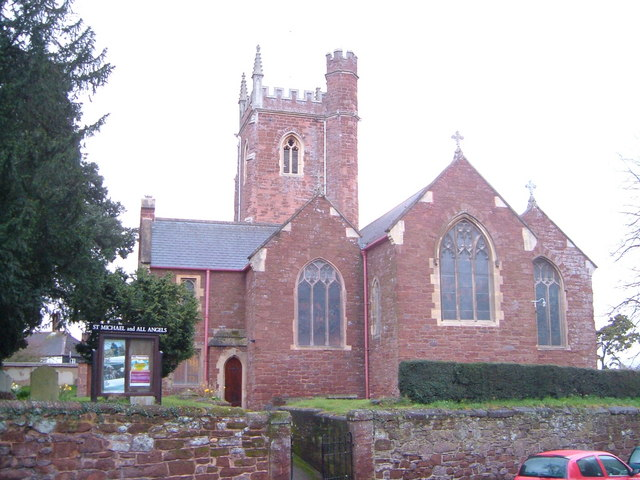
Church of St Michael and All Angels, Alphington, viewed from the east

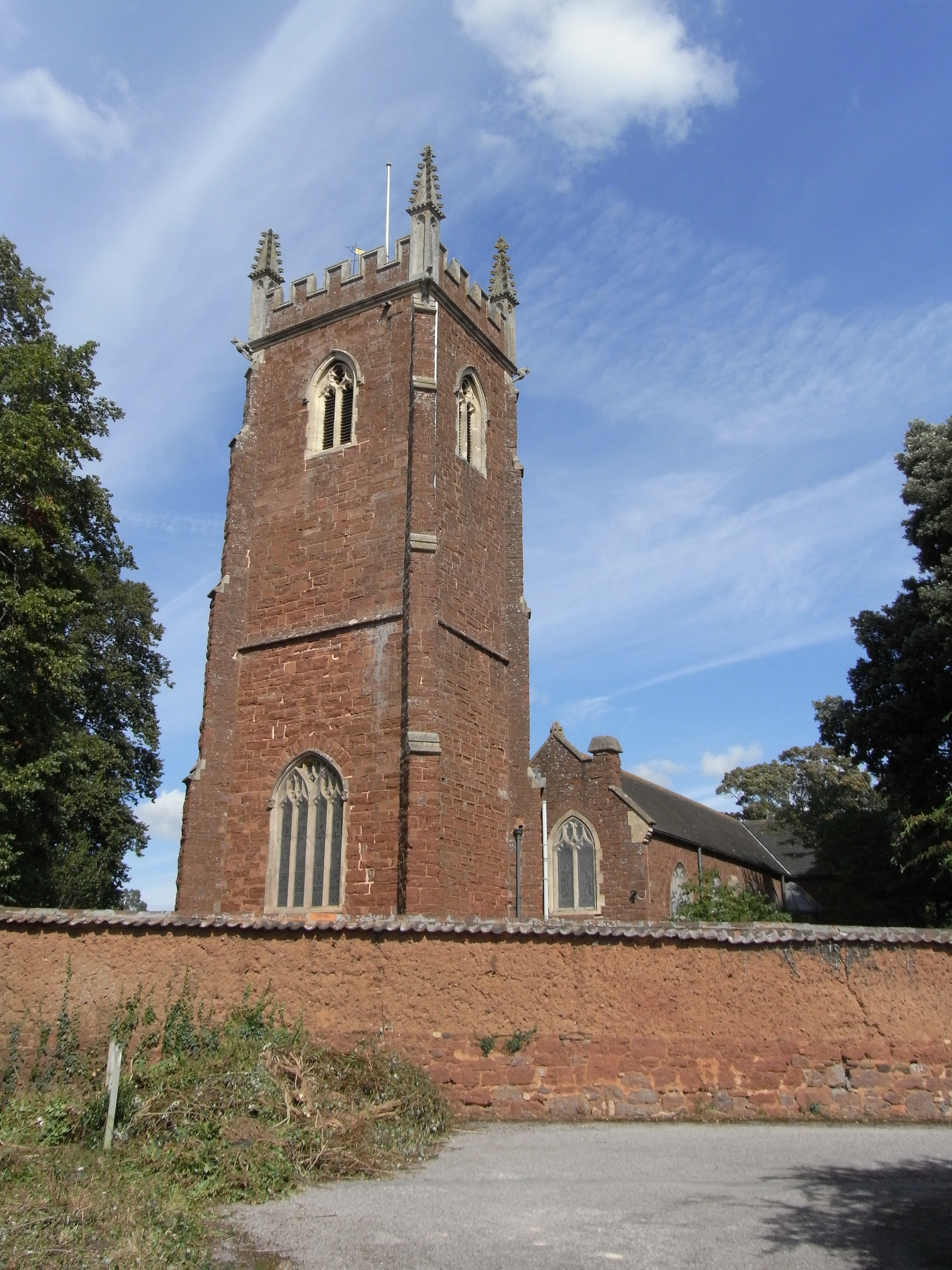
Church of St Michael and All Angels, Alphington, tower viewed from south

Alphington is a former manor and village, now a suburb of the City of Exeter in Devon. The ward of Alphington has a population of 8,250 according to the 2001 census, making it the third largest in Exeter, with the village itself accounting for about a quarter of this figure. The ward population increased to 8,266 at the 2021 census. It is surrounded on two sides by countryside, with the Marsh Barton trading estate to the east and Exeter City to the north. The Alphin Brook passes around the northern edge of Alphington. Alphington is on the south-western side of Exeter.

== Notable buildings ==
=== St Michael and All Angels parish church ===
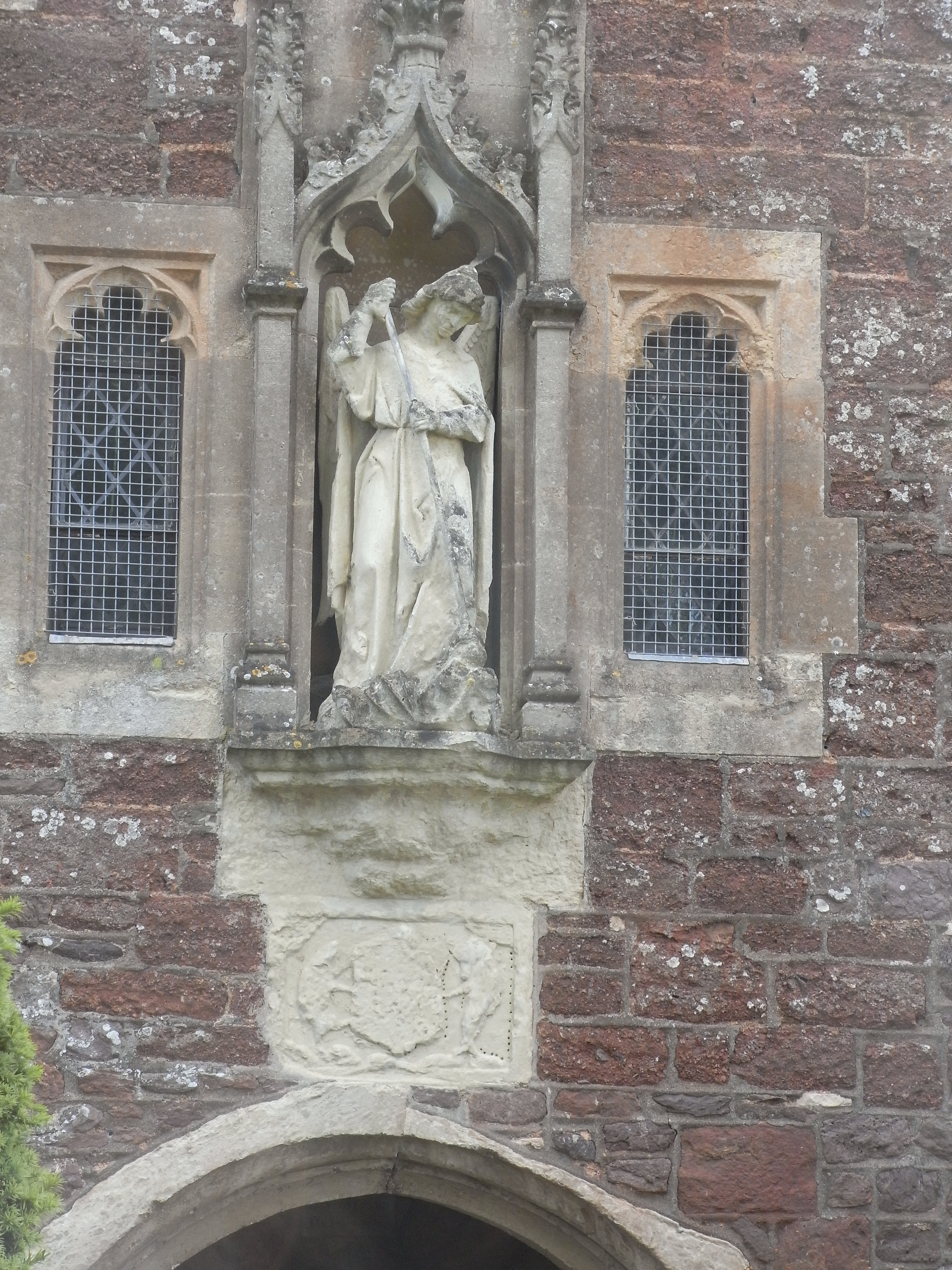
Porch, Church of St Michael and All Angels, with statue of St Michael the Archangel slaying a dragon. Below are displayed the armorials of the Courtenay family, Earls of Devon, sometime lords of the manor, worn away with only the supporters of a boar (dexter)and dolphin (sinister) still visible

Most of the fabric of the parish church of St Michael and All Angels originates from the 15th century, including the rood-screen. The north aisle screen is of a different style and design and possibly comes from another church, whilst the screen at the base of the tower was put together from the remains of the 1625 Jacobean gallery, demolished in 1875. Saint Apollonia was depicted on one of the panels but this has been badly disfigured. The 12th-century Norman font according to Arthur Mee (1965) is "believed by many to be the finest in Devon". It is sculpted from local Beer stone, and a fibreglass replica cast is currently (January 2016) in storage at Exeter's Royal Albert Memorial Museum.

In 1749, a peal of eight bells was hung in the church, having been cast by Bilbie of Cullompton. It was then the largest peal in the county. These eight bells were re-cast from the original five hung prior to 1550.

=== Other buildings ===
Cartwheels is a typical 15th-century Devon cob and timber farmhouse near the church, overlooking the Rectory. Mile End Cottage, on the main road through the village, is the house that Charles Dickens rented for his parents in 1839. Gidley's and Gidley's Cottage in Ide Lane are reputed to be the oldest dwelling in the village. There are numerous other thatched cottages including Pixies cottage (close to the church), and Laurel cottage (in Ide Lane), dating from the 17th century onwards as well as a Victorian prison building, recently renovated.

From 2 April 1928, Alphington had a halt on the old Teign Valley railway-line, but this was closed on 9 June 1958. It is still possible to see the abutments of the bridge that used to carry the railway-line over Church Road, and also smaller scale masonry remains at the previous overbridge in Ide Lane.

== History ==
Alphington formally became part of the City of Exeter in 1966, having previously been part of St Thomas Rural District.

=== Historic estates ===
- Matford

== Education ==
The modern Alphington Primary School is the main educational establishment in the village, with around 350 pupils aged between 5 and 11. Secondary Education is provided by West Exe Technology College, on the border between Alphington and St Thomas, and Exeter College. The old Victorian school building has been reused, housing the Pre-School and is used by other groups for meetings and activities.

== Sport ==
The village is represented in the South West Peninsula League Division One East (formerly the Devon County League) by the Alphington football team, nicknamed The Alphas, who play at The Chronicles (on Alphington Playing Field). The playing field is also home to the Alphington cricket team.

== Notable people from Alphington ==
- Charles Babbage (1791–1871), "father of computing" educated in Alphington
- Charles Dickens's parents (1839) moved to Alphington
- Charles Grene Ellicombe, British Army General
- Sir William Montagu Manning, Australian politician
- Robert Stone (1516–1613), composer and member of the Chapel Royal

== Namesake ==
Alphington, the suburb of Melbourne, Victoria, Australia was named after the village.
