= Ston Easton =

Village and civil parish in Somerset, England

Coordinates: 51.281°N 2.543°W

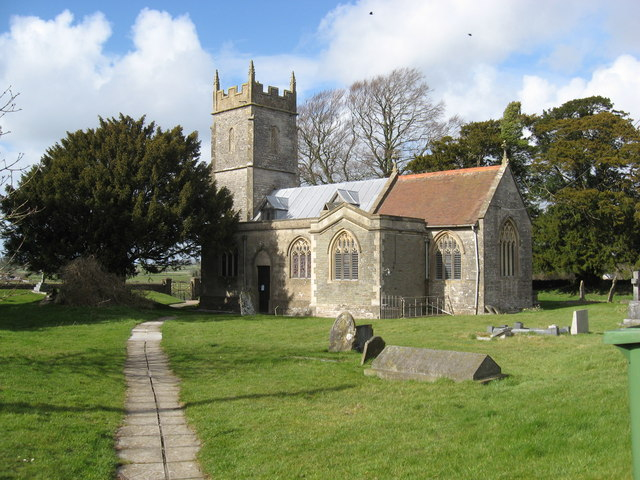
- Church of St Mary The Virgin

- Location within Somerset
- Population: 550 (2011)
- OS grid reference: ST622536
- Unitary authority: Somerset Council
- Ceremonial county: Somerset
- Region: South West
- Country: England
- Sovereign state: United Kingdom
- Post town: RADSTOCK
- Postcode district: BA3
- Dialling code: 01761
- Police: Avon and Somerset
- Fire: Devon and Somerset
- Ambulance: South Western
- UK Parliament: Wells and Mendip Hills

Ston Easton is a linear village and civil parish in the English county of Somerset. It is 14 miles (23 km) southwest of Bath and 7 miles (11 km) north of Shepton Mallet. It lies along the A37 road 11 miles (18 km) south of the cities of Bristol and Bath and to the west of the town of Midsomer Norton. The parish includes the hamlet of Clapton.

== History ==
The name Ston Easton comes from Easton or Estone, meaning town to the east of Chewton Mendip, and Ston or Stone from the geological strata in the area.

To the north of the village is a round barrow tumulus.

The village existed before the Norman Conquest and after 1066 was given to the Bishop of Coutances for his lifetime. In the reign of Henry III the manor was held by the family De Clifton who remained the lords until the reign of Edward III. By 1340 it had been divided into two manors. One was held by Simon de Trewhouse and the other by Bruton Abbey who held it until the dissolution of the monasteries when it was granted to John Hippisley.

The parish was part of the hundred of Chewton.

Ston Easton Park, a former country house noted for its Palladian architecture, built circa 1769 for John Hippisley Coxe, on a 17th-century foundation of which some fragments survive, is now a hotel and Grade I Listed building.

== Governance ==
The parish council has responsibility for local issues, including setting an annual precept (local rate) to cover the council's operating costs and producing annual accounts for public scrutiny. The parish council evaluates local planning applications and works with the local police, district council officers, and neighbourhood watch groups on matters of crime, security, and traffic. The parish council's role also includes initiating projects for the maintenance and repair of parish facilities, as well as consulting with the district council on the maintenance, repair, and improvement of highways, drainage, footpaths, public transport, and street cleaning. Conservation matters (including trees and listed buildings) and environmental issues are also the responsibility of the council.

For local government purposes, since 1 April 2023, the parish comes under the unitary authority of Somerset Council. Prior to this, it was part of the non-metropolitan district of Mendip (established under the Local Government Act 1972). It was part of Clutton Rural District before 1974.

It is also part of the Wells and Mendip Hills county constituency represented in the House of Commons of the Parliament of the United Kingdom. It elects one Member of Parliament (MP) by the first past the post system of election.

== Religious sites ==
The Church of St Mary The Virgin is a grade II* listed building dating from the 11th century, with a 15th-century embattled three-stage west tower. It was much rebuilt at the end of the 19th century, by Blomfield.

The most striking interior feature is the Norman chancel arch, with semi-circular head and colonettes. The pews, choir stalls, altar rails, pulpit, font and screen are all 19th-century. There are several 18th- and 19th-century wall monuments.

== Notable residents ==
- The geologist John Beaumont lived here.
- Jacob Rees-Mogg, the MP representing the North East Somerset constituency, though he was born in Hammersmith, grew up in Ston Easton.
- William Rees-Mogg, Editor for The Times lived in Ston Easton with his wife and children.
